= Terry Hall (policeman) =

Canadian policeman (1945-2016)

- Born: Terrance Levi Hall; 13 September 1945; Tillsonburg, Ontario, Canada
- Died: 1 January 2016 (aged 70); London, Ontario, Canada
- Known for: Lead investigator in the Port Hope 8 case
- Police career
- Department: Toronto Police Service; Ontario Provincial Police
- Branch: Special Squad
- Service years: 1962–1997

Terrance Levi Hall (13 September 1945 – 1 January 2016) was a Canadian policeman who served as an officer of the Toronto Police Service and the Ontario Provincial Police (OPP). Hall was the commander of the OPP's Special Squad, which targeted outlaw biker gangs, and was the lead investigator in the Port Hope 8 case, in which six members of Satan's Choice Motorcycle Club were controversially convicted of murder.

== Early police career ==
Hall was born in Tillsonburg, the son of Frank and Ethel Hall. He joined the Toronto Police Service in 1962 at the age of 17. In 1967, he transferred over to the Ontario Provincial Police (OPP). As a policeman, he stood out because he was 6 ft 5 in (1.96 m) tall. Paul Bailey, a policeman with the York Regional Police, said of him: "He was a consummate professional and a great friend to many police officers". Baily stated that he had a great hatred for outlaw bikers and when the police raided the clubhouses of biker gangs: "He would be the first one in the door and the last one to leave. I raided a number of them with him."

== The Special Squad ==
In 1973, Hall was appointed commander of the Special Squad of the OPP dedicated to pursuing outlaw bikers. Hall was informed by his superiors that he need not observe "legal niceties" in his line of work. Hall's appearance with his long hair, long beard and casual way of dressing in T-shirts and jeans made him appear more like an outlaw biker than a policeman. Hall waged a campaign that he called "reverse intimidation" as he used the violent methods that the bikers used against them. The American journalist Mick Lowe wrote: "Since 1973, Hall had inhabited a strange nether region on the fringes of Canadian law enforcement", making him into a "black legend among Canadian bikers" who feared him as a policeman who did not follow the law. Hall was notorious for his threat: "Just remember one thing, punk—my gang's bigger than your gang!" In 1975, Hall, while working undercover with the Queensmen biker gang in Windsor, went riding with the Windsor chapter of Satan's Choice, during which he was injured in a minor traffic incident. One of the bikers thought they saw a police ID badge fell out of his wallet. The sergeant-at-arms raided Hall's apartment and found detailed notes on all of the other members of the Queensmen along police phone numbers, which revealed that Hall was an undercover policeman. The Queensmen were aligned with Satan's Choice, and it was Hall's intention to join the Queensmen as a stepping stone to joining Satan's Choice. Bernie "The Frog" Guindon, the president of Satan's Choice, said of Hall: "He was pretty smart. I'm positive there was other [undercover] guys in all the clubs". The most important informer working for Hall was Garnet "Mother" McEwen, the president of the Satan's Choice St. Catharines chapter.

Hall was the prime source for journalists about outlaw bikers in Ontario, and he was the main source for a source in the Kitchener-Waterloo Record by John Kessel and John Schenk on 10 March 1977 that began with the by-line: "Waterloo Region, the home of Mennonites, Oktoberfest and the farmer's markets a breeding ground for organized crime? Impossible! Terry Hall, an OPP intelligence officer who rode undercover with many of Ontario's motorcycle gangs for two years, say it's so". Hall accused the Kitchener chapter of Satan's Choice of "the manufacture and sale of illegal drugs, prostitution, gambling, murder and other violence for pay, counterfeit money and bogus-check rings, and the fencing of valuable stolen goods". The story in the Kitchener-Waterloo Record was part of a media offensive waged by the Special Squad intended to secure a larger budget as Hall served as the primary source for a number of articles that appeared in newspapers in Ontario in 1977 and 1978 that painted a lucid picture of the outlaw biker gangs. Hall obtained even more success with a story in Maclean's magazine in July 1977 by Kessell and Schenk entitled "Born to Raise Hell Inc", which he again served as the main source for, which started with the by-line: "The outlaw motorcycle gangs are North America's newest and most overlooked form of organized crime". Hall called the Maclean's story "our first big break", which led to the Ontario government drastically increasing the budget for the Special Squad. In the late 1970s, Hall would attend Satan's Choice events wearing a T-shirt with the patch of the Outlaws along with the slogan "Support Your Local Outlaws", and at Outlaw events he would wear a T-shirt with the patch of Satan's Choice and the slogan "Support Your Local Satan's Choice", which was considered provocative.

On the night of 18 October 1978, Hall led a police raid on the clubhouse of the Kitchener chapter of Satan's Choice on Weber Street, of which he knocked down the door and damaged the lock. During the raid, words were exchanged with the treasurer of the Kitchener chapter, David Hoffman, whom Hall was to charge with conspiracy to commit murder in December. After Hall left, Hoffman was to set about repairing the lock that Hall had damaged. Later on that same night, a biker, William Matiyek, was killed in Port Hope.

On 27 October 1978, Hall took charge of the Port Hope 8 case. Hall seems to have decided to use Matiyek's death as a chance to cripple Satan's Choice by convicting as many bikers as possible of his murder. Hall began his investigation by following around Richard Sauvé and Gordon van Haarlem, whom he considered to be prime suspects in the murder of William Matiyek. Hall took both Sauvé and van Haarlem into custody to question them about the murder. Later on, Hall insisted on playing a game of pool with Sauvé and Merv Blaker, during which he boasted that he had been following them for days. Hall and Sauvé nearly got involved in a brawl, but the dispute was ended when Hall instead beat up another Satan's Choice biker, Bobby Cousins. Hall's way of trying to identify other suspects in the murder of Matiyek by having one of his deputies, Constable Donald Denis, show photo arrays of Satan's Choice's members to the witnesses of the murder was controversial. On 5 December 1978, Hall obtained arrest warrants for eight Satan's Choice bikers, whom came to be known as the "Port Hope 8".

Hall testified as an expert witness for the Crown, saying that Satan's Choice was the second largest biker gang in Ontario with about 75 members. Ed Martin, the lawyer for Hoffman, asked Hall did he see Hoffman on the night of 18 October 1978 and received a positive reply. However, Hall claimed it was still possible for Hoffman to go to Port Hope after he had left, saying: "I drove the 195 kilometers in one hour and 23 minutes" from Kitchener to Port Hope. Martin in his cross-examination of Hall had him admit that to make the trip described, he would have been required to drive at 160 km/hour, well in excess of the speed limit. During the trial, the journalist Douglas Glaister of Maclean's took a strong dislike to Hall who was always in the courtroom as he believed that Hall was a more thuggish man than the accused. Glaister had decided to do a story of Hall entitled "The biggest gang of all", which was meant to be an expose of the Special Squad as Glaister felt that the only difference between Hall and the bikers he pursued was that Hall had a police badge while the bikers did not. In a bizarre incident during a visit to Port Hope, Glaister's notes for his article were stolen and destroyed by one of the Crown's witnesses, the town councilor Rod Stewart, who apparently thought it was his duty as a witness to prevent Glaister's article from appearing. During the sentencing phrase of the Port Hope 8 case on 17 December 1979, Hall appeared as an expert witness for the Crown, where he testified that Satan's Choice engaged, as he put it, in "extortions, trafficking and manufacturing of illicit drugs, robbery, assault, rapes, theft of property and of motor vehicles, possession of restricted weapons, prohibited weapons, dealing in these weapons, sale, transporting, I would have to say even to the field of loan-sharking, contract killing and contract muscle work". On the basis of Hall's statements, Justice Osborne sentenced four of the Port Hope 8 to life imprisonment with a chance for parole after 10 years.

Hall has often faced allegations that he framed the Port Hope 8 or at very least conducted a very poor investigation as he failed to provide to the defense lawyers audio tapes of a bugged phone calls that proved that one of the "Port Hope 8", David Hoffman, was in Kitchener the night of the murder and was not in Port Hope as the Crown claimed at the trial in 1979. Likewise, the jacket that Gary Comeau was wearing on the night of that Matiyek was murdered that had a bullet hole in it, which would have supported Comeau's story of being shot, vanished after being seized by the police on 10 January 1979. Finally, one of the witnesses for the Crown at the trial, Roger Davey, was later to claimed that Hall had forced him to perjure himself on the stand via intimidation. In the 1990 protest song " Justice in Ontario" by Steve Earle, Hall is accused by name of framing the Port Hope 8.

== Later life ==
Hall retired in 1997 after serving in the homicide squad. In his retirement, he served as a member of the Aylmer Shrine Club, the Royal Order of Jesters and the Masonic lodge, Malahide Lodge #140. Hall died on 1 January 2016 in London, Ontario of cancer, at the age of 70. Baily said of him: "He was in good spirits to the end. He was an inspiration to all of us. Everything was a positive. There wasn’t a weak part of Terry that I knew."

== Books and articles ==
- Lowe, Mick (2013). A Conspiracy of Brothers: A True Story of Bikers, Murder and the Law. Toronto: Vintage Canada. ISBN 978-0345813169.
- Edwards, Peter (2017). Hard Road: Bernie Guindon and the Reign of the Satan's Choice Motorcycle Club. Toronto: Random House. ISBN 978-0345816108.
