= Port Hope 8 case =

Trial of 8 members of the Satan's Choice Motorcycle Club in 1979

The Port Hope 8 case refers to the trial of eight members of the Satan's Choice Motorcycle Club in 1979 for the murder of William John Matiyek on 18 October 1978 at the Queen's Hotel in Port Hope, Ontario. Of the accused, six were convicted, and the case is widely considered to be a miscarriage of justice. Of the "Port Hope 8", Gary Comeau and Richard Sauvé were convicted of first degree murder; Jeff McLeod, David Hoffman, Merv Blaker and Larry Hurren were convicted of second degree murder; and Armand Sanguigni and Gordon van Haarlem were acquitted.

== Background ==
The largest motorcycle gang in Ontario in the 1960s-1970s were the Satan's Choice Motorcycle Club founded in 1965. In 1973, the Ontario government decided to put all the outlaw biker clubs out of business, and had the Intelligence Branch of the Ontario Provincial Police (OPP) set up a Special Squad with the unfortunate acronym of the SS dedicated entirely to pursuing outlaw bikers. The Special Squad was later renamed the Anti-Biker Unit. Orders were given to the Special Squad that "legal niceties" could be disregarded as the politicians demanded convictions to show the public that action was being taken. Corporal Terry Hall, the chief of the Special Squad called the campaign against Satan's Choice "reverse intimidation" as the Special Squad sought to intimidate bikers via the same means used by the bikers themselves. The American journalist Mick Lowe wrote that, starting in 1973, Hall "had inhabited a strange nether region on the fringes of Canadian law enforcement" as he went after bikers via very ruthless and sometimes illegal methods, making him into a "black legend among Canadian bikers" who feared him as a policeman who did not follow the law. Even Hall's appearance with his long hair and beard and a generally disheveled look made him appear more like an outlaw biker than a policeman.

On 1 July 1977, Satan's Choice was split when led by its interim national president, Garnet McEwen, the Satan's Choice chapters in Windsor, St. Catharines, London, Montreal, Ottawa, Sault Ste. Marie, Hamilton, and Kingston all joined the Outlaws Motorcycle Club. By contrast, the Satan's Choice chapters in Toronto, Kitchener, Oshawa, Thunder Bay and Peterbourgh remained loyal to the imprisoned national president, Bernie Guindon. The "Big Split" as the break-up was known caused much ill-will and anguish with many Satan's Choice members feeling that it was like a family being divided after a divorce as members either opted to join the Outlaws or remain with Satan's Choice.

The Golden Hawk Riders of Port Hope were a small biker gang of seven members, and were considering "patching over" to join the Outlaws. In the aftermath of the split of 1977, relations between the Outlaws and Satan's Choice were very unfriendly. Several members of Satan' Choice warned the Golden Hawk Riders, including their sergeant-at-arms, William "Heavy" Matiyek, who had a reputation as a hothead, not to go through with the planned "patch over", a demand that Matiyek rejected. Port Hope is a small town close to Oshawa, and an Outlaw chapter in Port Hope would threaten the profits from the drug trade enjoyed by the Satan's Choice Oshawa chapter. With Port Hope less than a half an hour away by automobile from Oshawa, an Outlaw chapter in Port Hope would effectively be the same as an Outlaw chapter in Oshawa. Lowe described the outlaw biker scene in Port Hope in the 1970s as "semi-organized crime" as he admitted that the bikers sold drugs, but stated that many of the bikers were more outcasts from society rather than career criminals. Some of the Port Hope Eight such as David Hoffman, Richard Sauvé, and Merv Blaker held legitimate jobs and had no major criminal records while others such as Armand Sanguigni, Gary Comeau, and Jeff McLeod had no jobs and were engaged in various criminal enterprises.

Matiyek was known as the "town bully" in Port Hope. Standing 6' 3” and weighing 300 pounds, Matiyek was greatly disliked in Port Hope due to his rage issues and a tendency to threaten people with violence. The American journalist Mick Lowe described Matiyek as a "walking, talking one-man arsenal" as he usually had with him a sawed-off .410 shotgun along with a .32 pistol. Though both weapons were illegal, Matiyek often pulled out his guns and threatened to shoot people on the spot if they did not give in to his demands. People in Port Hope were too terrified of Matiyek to ever call the police, which encouraged Matiyek to continue with his aggressive, bullying behavior. Matiyek still lived at home with his parents at the age of 23, and believed that joining the Outlaws would make him into a more successful drug dealer who would finally be able to live on his own. Lowe wrote that Matiyek lived in "utter terror of Satan's Choice", and despite his bluster, he was constantly on the look-out for members for Satan's Choice whom he greatly feared. In 1976, at a party at the clubhouse of the Golden Hawk Riders, Matiyek had been beaten up by Lorne Campbell of Satan's Choice, a humiliation that deeply rankled him. Campbell had also stolen Matiyek's bikers' vest with his Golden Hawk Rider patch during the same brawl, a great humiliation in the world of outlaw bikers who are expected to never lose their biker patches. In an incident in July 1977, Matiyek had lumbered by the house of a Satan's Choice biker living in Port Hope, Richard Sauvé, to shoot up the house with his shotgun, forcing Sauvé's wife, Sharon, and his daughter, Angela, to take cover in their living room. Sauvé stayed faithful to the outlaw biker code and did not report the incident. Instead, Sauvé went to confront Matiyek with a baseball bat and warned him not to endanger the lives of his wife and child again or else he would kill him. Sauvé discovered much to his own surprise that Matiyek was an abject coward who apologized for the incident as he maintained that he was very drunk and high on drugs when he shot up the Sauvé house, and that he was unwilling to take up the challenge of a brawl out of the fear that Sauvé would hurt him. The Queen's Hotel in Port Hope had once been one of the most luxurious hotels in Ontario, but by the 1970s had been reduced down to a seedy, disreputable place with the bar-room featuring strippers of both sexes in an attempt to attract customers. The Queen's Hotel was Matiyek's favourite place to drink and he usually could be found there in the evenings.

== The Killing of Matiyek ==
Brian Brideau, a petty criminal and an associate of Satan's Choice, was in the bar-room of the Queen's Hotel on the night of 18 October 1978 when he encountered Matiyek drinking with two Outlaws. Brideau was a drug addict who annoyed many with his incessant begging for money and Matiyek, who greatly disliked him, proceeded to beat him up and throw him out of the Queen's Hotel. Brideau sought revenge by calling Satan's Choice's Peterborough chapter from the phone booth outside the Queen's Hotel. A member of the Peterborough chapter, Richard Sauvé, took the phone call from Brideau, who said that Matiyek was drinking with two Outlaws, Fred Jones and Sonny Bronson, at the Queen's Hotel and wanted to see an officer of the Peterborough chapter that night. Sauvé choose to accept the challenge as he did not wish to be appear cowardly by staying at home, but unwilling to face Matiyek with only Merv "Indian" Blaker of the Peterborough chapter as an ally, Sauvé called the other chapters for help. Sauvé knew that Matiyek was a coward when sober, but tended to be violent when drunk, especially when he wanted to impress others. Blaker, who owned his moniker to the fact that he was an Ojibwe, was felt to be too easy-going for a possible bar fight. At 9:19 pm, Sauvé phoned the Satan's Choice clubhouse in Toronto to ask for help, but Gary Comeau of the Toronto chapter told him that he'd rather watch a hockey game. At 9:30 pm, Sauvé phoned again and this time Comeau promised to go to Port Hope to assist his biker "brother". While Sauvé and Blaker drove west to Port Hope, several members of the Toronto chapter abandoned drinking and watching a hockey game at their clubhouse to head east to Port Hope. The members from Toronto who went to Port Hope that night were Garry "Nutty" Comeau, Jeff "Boom Boom" McLeod, Larry "Beaver" Hurren, Lorne Campbell and Armand "In the Trunk" Sanguigni. Lowe wrote that the "scariest" of the Satan's Choice bikers who went to the Queen's Hotel was Sanguigni, a man with close links to the Mafia who worked as a hitman subcontractor for the mob, being the prime suspect in several murders. Of all the Satan's Choice bikers who went to the Queen's Hotel, the one who stood out the most in the memories of those present was Comeau, a tall man with long blonde hair.

As the Choice members entered the Queen's Hotel at about 10:50 pm, Gayle Thompson, the head waitresses present who recognized Blaker and Sauvé as she had served them before, reminded the owner of the Queen's Hotel, Leo Powell, that Satan's Choice's members were banned from the hotel owing to past unruly behavior. Thompson advised calling the police, but Powell decided to let them stay as the bar was almost empty that night and he felt he needed their money. One of the waitresses present, Cathy Cotgrave, told Blaker and Sauvé that Satan's Choice bikers were banned from the Queen's Hotel and that they would not be served. A confrontation, with Golden Hawk Rider Matiyek and the two Outlaws on one side and the Satan's Choice members on the other, began in the bar-room soon after. Sanguigni was arguing with Jones in the pinball room, accusing him of being a "traitor" for leaving Satan's Choice for the Outlaws, and Jones was described as being "hysterical" as he argued with the Mafia hitman Sanguigni. Sauvé sat down with Matiyek and quickly learned that he did not want to see him as he instead flashed his handgun and said he had "nine friends", which was interpreted to mean that he had nine bullets in his gun. Comeau joined Sauvé at the table and was likewise threatened.

Matiyek, who was drunk and high on marijuana and amphetamines, was talking about shooting the Satan's Choice members in the Queen's Hotel bar-room, causing Lorne Campbell of the Choice's Toronto chapter to come to their aid. Campbell had heard that Matiyek had a gun and he brought along a gun to the Queen's Hotel. The confrontation in the bar-room ended with guns being drawn and Campbell shooting and killing Matiyek at about 10:55 pm. Campbell claims that Matiyek had reached for his gun first, leading him to open fire. Campbell shot Matiyek three times. The first bullet went through Matiyek's neck, the second through his skull and the third likewise, thought Matiyek was already dead as the second bullet had cut a deadly path though his brain. Campbell states that he shot Matiyek in self-defence, saying:

"As soon as I said: 'How are you doing?" he went for it...I totally wish he hadn't gone for it. I've had to live with it. It hasn't been easy. But he went for it and I happened to be faster...It happened so fast that I just reacted. When you see somebody going for a gun and you've got one, with the upbringing I've had, you'll be fast. I'm glad I had a gun...I never questioned my decision. Not once. Not for a second".

The bullets all entered Matiyek's body from the left and one struck Comeau who was sitting to the right of Matiyek. The women present, namely the waitresses Gayle Thompson and Cathy Cotgrave along with the bar patrons Sue Foote and Jamie Hanna all fled into the woman's washroom, and all left the Queen's Hotel in tears over horror over the shooting they just seen. McLeod fled the John Street entrance and left in Sanguigni's car. Likewise, Blaker and Sauvé fled via the John Street entrance and left via Blaker's car. Sauvé was stunned by what he had seen and kept saying "holy fuck man, what happened?" Constables Kenneth Wilson and David MacDonald of the Port Hope police arrived at the Queen's Hotel at 11: 08 pm and reported that the corpse of Matiyek was lying in a pool of his own blood.

Several of the Satan's Choice members who fled the Queen's Hotel such as Comeau, Blaker and Sauvé drove to Kitchener to contact David "Tee Hee" Hoffmann of the Kitchener chapter because he was considered intelligent and was felt to be capable of treating Comeau's wound. Public opinion in Port Hope was outraged that a murder had taken place in their small town. The Port Hope Evening Guide in an editorial on 19 October 1978 stated: "Terrifying cold-blooded premeditated murder has destroyed the security of this tranquil community, smashing forever the misconception that violence and homicide exists only in the big cities. Will it ever be safe to walk the streets of Port Hope at night again?" In the aftermath of Matiyek's murder, the president of the Golden Hawk Riders, Lawrence Leon, was so demoralized that he disbanded his club, now down to six members, and the Golden Hawk Riders did not join the Outlaws.

== The Investigation ==
On the night of the murder, Sergeant Samuel McReelis of the Port Hope police arrived at the Queen's Hotel as the lead investigator. McReelis was known in Port Hope as "Shotgun Sam" for an incident where he pointed a shotgun at a group of unruly teenagers (one of whom happened to be the daughter of a wealthy family), was considered to be a hard-working if overzealous policeman. Murders rarely occurred in Port Hope, and McReelis despite having served with the Port Hope police since 1967 was inexperienced with murder investigations. The Port Hope police service was a small force of 11 officers that was so underfunded in the 1960s-1970s that its officers wore no uniforms and had paper badges. Because of the presence of Sauvé and Blaker, it was assumed by McReelis right from the start that the other men with them were Satan's Choice. In a 2003 interview, McReelis stated that small towns such as Port Hope were being "terrorized" by outlaw biker gangs. Much of the police investigation was slapdash with the detectives taking no fingerprints from the crime scene while interviewing the witnesses as a group instead of individually. Had McReelis had the barroom dusted for fingerprints, he could have identified the other Satan's Choice bikers present from their fingerprints on the pints of beer, which could have been matched with their fingerprints in the police files, and his decision not to do so has been widely criticized as an example of his incompetence. The day after the murder, Inspector Colin Cousens of the Ontario Provincial Police arrived to take over the investigation while McReelis was demoted down to his deputy. Corporal Terry Hall of the OPP's Special Squad, who took charge of the investigation on 27 October 1978 seems to have decided to use Matiyek's death as a chance to cripple Satan's Choice by convicting as many bikers as possible of his murder. Hall's investigative methods were heterodox and contrary to accepted standards, but what mattered to him was to obtain as many convictions as possible. Despite his demotion, McReelis remained a key member of the investigation team as he knew Port Hope better than any of the detectives from elsewhere. One of the investigators, Colin Cousens, in his notes to Hall stated that several of the witnesses had mentioned that one of the Satan's Choice bikers had been shot in the arm and left the Queen's Hotel bleeding.

Both Sauvé and Blaker had frequently drank at the Queen's Hotel in the past and the waitresses of the hotel present at the time of the shooting, Gayle Thompson and Kathy Cotgrave, identified both men by name as being present when Matiyek was killed. Thompson and Cotgrave stated that they both frequently served Sauvé and Blaker, and both men admitted to the police to being present when Matiyek was killed. However, the other members of Satan's Choice's Toronto chapter present were not known to the either the patrons and staff of the Queen's Hotel. The Queen's Hotel had no security cameras and as result the police had to depend upon the memories of the witnesses. The witnesses did not know the members of the Toronto chapter and were further handicapped by the fact that the bar-room of the Queen's Hotel was dimly lit and was filled with cigarette smoke. Much of Hall's investigation consisted of stalking and confronting Sauvé and Blaker along with another Satan's Choice biker, Gordon van Haarlem who frequently served as a babysitter for Sauvé.

Joining Hall was Constable Donald Denis, a 15-year veteran of the OPP who had joined the Special Squad in January 1978 and whose specialty was in photographing outlaw bikers at their events. Constable Denis showed the witnesses photographs of various Satan's Choice members in attempts to identify those present when Matiyek was killed. Denis had no experience with showing photographs to witnesses and allowed group viewings of the photographs of various Satan's Choice bikers as he was unaware at the time that this was a violation of accepted investigation techniques, which called for witnesses to be interviewed as individuals. Denis placed red dots on the photographs of Comeau, which gave the impression to witnesses that he was a man being singled out by the investigation. Lowe noted that interviewing witnessing as a group is contrary to police procedures as the other witnesses felt pressure to identify one of the men whose photographs were being shown as being present at the Queen's Hotel when one of the witnesses insisted that man was present. The witnesses were never shown Campbell's photograph. Many aspects of the case were puzzling to the police such as the missing third bullet. The witnesses all stated that three shots had been fired and there were three bullet holes in Matiyek's corpse, but the police found only two bullets at the crime scene with one resting in Matiyek's skull and another in the wall of the Queen's Hotel.

Thompson and Cotgrave stated after seeing Comeau's photograph that he was present at the murder and thought he may have been the man who killed Matiyek, though neither waitress were entirely certain on that point. The red dots placed on Comeau's photographs increased the pressure on Thompson and Cotgrave to name him as the killer. On 28 October 1978, Thompson and Cotgrave were first allowed to view the photographs of Satan's Choice members together, a breach of accepted rules that was later justified by Denis at the trial under the grounds that both women were having much difficulty in identifying members of Satan's Choice and needed each other's help to jog their memories. On 28 October, Cotgrave identified out of the photo array Hurren, Sanguigni, Hoffman, McLeod and along with two Satan's Choice bikers in prison at the time, Michael Gallaway and Randy Gobo as present when Matiyek was killed. As for Comeau, she stated "could be the trigger man" on her viewing and "thought to be the trigger man" on the second viewing. During the same session, Thompson named Comeau as the killer and identified Sauvé, Hurren, Hoffman, Blaker and another Satan's Choice biker in prison, Michael Everett as being present at the murder. By November 1978, besides for Comeau, Cotgrave and Thompson named Sauvé, Blaker, Hurren and Hoffman as being present at the murder. On 5 December 1978, a warrant was issued for the arrests of Blaker, Comeau, Sauvé, McLeod, Sanguigni, Hurren and Hoffman on charges of conspiracy to commit murder. The Toronto police smashed their way into the clubhouse of the Toronto chapter, using a truck with a boom to rip out the steel door. Arrested at the clubhouse were Comeau, Hurren, and McLeod. Hoffman was arrested in Kitchener the same day. After his arrest, Cousens expressed much interest in the bullet wound in Comeau's arm and in his notes described an entrance wound on his arm. Two of the men picked out the photo array and charged with Matiyek's murder, David Hoffman and Gordon van Haarlem, were not present at the Queen's Hotel on the night of 18 October 1978. McLeod was to claim to a private detective in an interview on 6 February 1992 that it was common knowledge that van Haarlem "was screwing McReelis's wife" and that was the reason why van Haarlem was charged.

On 10 January 1979, a group of policemen led by McReelis raided the house of Comeau's mother, Betty King, to seize Comeau's jacket with the bullet hole. McReelis made it clear to Comeau that he wanted to find that jacket, which was found in Comeau's room. The jacket was entered into the police evidence locker room, and then mysteriously disappeared, never to be seen again. On 15 January 1979, the Crown Attorney in charge of the case, Chris Meinhardt, increased the charges for the Port Hope 8 from conspiracy to commit murder to first degree murder.

== The Preliminary Hearing ==
On 19 February 1979, a preliminary hearing (the Canadian equivalent to the American grand jury phrase of a trial) opened in Port Hope to see there was enough evidence to bring the accused to trial. A major point during the preliminary hearing was the claim by Howard Kerbel, who served as Comeau's lawyer, that his client had been shot, and therefore he could not had been the killer. Comeau had a gunshot wound in his arm, but the Crown claimed that the wound was due to another incident. The jacket that Comeau was wearing on the night of 18 October 1978, which Comeau stated had a bullet hole in the arm, had gone missing after McReelis had seized it on 10 January 1979. McReelis testified that the jacket had been placed in the police evidence locker-room and simply vanished, saying he did not know what happened to the jacket other than it was missing. Without the jacket, there was no way to establish if Comeau had been shot on the night 18 October 1978. On 23 February 1979, the preliminary hearing concluded that there was enough evidence to try eight members of Satan's Choice for Matiyek's murder with Campbell being conspicuously absent.

The lead defence counsel was Bruce Affleck, the lawyer for Jeff McLeod. Affleck was a former Crown Attorney with a genius level IQ who had once been declared to be Canada's "winningest Crown prosecutor" as he won 99% of the cases he prosecuted. The lead Crown Attorney for the Port Hope 8 case, Chris Meinhardt, had once been a protégé of Affleck, and there was an element of intense personal rivalry at the trial as Meinhardt took on the man who had once been his mentor. Meinhardt was known for ruthlessness in the courtroom and had the unflattering nickname of "Chris Mean Heart" as he had a reputation for cruelty. That Meinhardt was assigned to the Port Hope 8 case was a sign that the Crown considered the case to be a highly important one and was determined to win this case. The junior Crown counsel who assisted Meinhardt was Roland Harris. The other defence lawyers were Terry O'Hara who defended Blaker; Don Ebbs who defended van Haarlem; David Newman who defended Hurren; Howard Kerbel who defended Comeau; Jack Grossman who defended Sauvé; Bernard Cugelman who defended Sanguigni; and Ed Martin who defended Hoffman. With the exceptions of Affleck and O'Hara, none of the defence counsel were considered to be outstanding lawyers.

Of all the defence counsel, the one who was most closest to his client was O'Hara who was absolutely convinced that Blaker was innocent, and argued tenaciously on his behalf for a decade. O'Hara based this belief on the grounds that Sanguigni was a professional hitman for the Mafia who had been committed at least 11 murders with the police never being able to find enough evidence to charge him while Comeau's reputation was that of a bumbling petty criminal. O'Hara concluded that if the murder of Matiyek had been a case of premeditated first-degree murder as the Crown claimed, the task would have been assigned to the coldly professional hitman Sanguigni rather than the bumbling and inept Comeau, which led him to the conclusion that there was no conspiracy to kill Matiyek and the killing of Matiyek was an unpremeditated case of second-degree murder. By contrast, Affleck did not have the best of relations with McLeod, who told him very little about what happened at the Queen's Hotel, leading for Affleck to be operating in an information vacuum.

On 5 July 1979, the entire defence counsel team had their first and only meeting at Kerbel's house in Toronto to plan for the trial. Both Hoffman and van Haarlem had planned to take an alibi defence and were going to testify that they were not in Port Hope on the night of the murder. With the exception of O'Hara, the other lawyers were opposed to their clients taking the stand under the grounds that they intended to follow the outlaw biker code and would not incriminate a biker in a crime by testifying that Campbell had killed Matiyek, which was believed would make a terrible impression on the jury. O'Hara wanted to call Blaker as a witness, saying that Blaker with his sincerity would make a good impression on the jury, but he was met with such opposition from the other defence counsel that he had abandoned his plans.

To spare his biker "brothers" from going to prison for a crime he had committed, Campbell confessed to killing Matiyek. In August 1979, the Crown offered a plea bargain under which Campbell would plead guilty to second-degree murder and spent the next 10 years in prison while the rest of the "Port Hope 8" would plead guilty to being accessories to murder and spend the next 4 years in prison. Campbell was willing to accept the Crown's deal, but several of the "Port Hope 8" such as David "Tee Hee" Hoffman and Gordon "Dog Map" Van Haarlem objected under the grounds that they were not at the Queen's Hotel on the night of 18 October 1978, and should not have to do any prison time.

== The Trial of the "Port Hope 8" ==
=== The opening of the trial ===
People in Port Hope were so outraged by Matiyek's murder that it was deemed impossible to find an impartial jury in that town, so the trial was held in London, Ontario. The jury was made up of seven men and five women. The jurors were all white, middle class and middle-aged. The defence lawyers would have preferred that the trial be held in Toronto, but the Crown insisted on holding the trial in London, Ontario despite the fears of the defence lawyers that a jury from Middlesex County would not be sympatric towards outlaw bikers. The trial entitled Regina vs. McLeod et al began on 4 September 1979 as part of the Fall Assizes. The Crown Attorney at the trial, Chris Meinhardt, presented the case as a first-degree murder, calling it "a foul, horrible, planned execution." Meinhardt argued that there was a conspiracy to kill Matiyek with various Satan's Choice members blocking the exit points to the bar-room of the Queen's Hotel so that Matiyek could not escape while Comeau was the killer. Meinhardt argued that those who blocked the exits to the barroom of the Queen's Hotel were just as guilty of first degree murder as Comeau. Meinhardt showed photographs of the accused, all of whom except for Sanguigni were men with long hair and long beards in an attempt to invoke fear and disgust from the jury towards the accused.

The journalist Jerry Langton wrote that the trial was "comical" as some of the witnesses for the Crown "changed their testimony three or even four times...Much of the Crown's evidence contradicted itself". Matiyek had a .32 semi-automatic pistol with him when he died, but that gun had only eight bullets in it instead of nine, which Meinhardt used to dismiss the testimony about Matiyek speaking about having "9 friends". Several of the accused were to later maintain that a policeman had removed one of the bullets from Matiyek's gun. The fact that none of the accused present at the Queen's Hotel took the stand did not help their case as juries tend to be very suspicious of defendants who excised their right not to testify. Of the Port Hope 8, only Hoffman and van Haarlem took the stand to testify in their defence. The two principle journalists who covered the trial were Mac Haig, the crime correspondent of the London Free Press, and Douglas Glaister, a free-lance reporter, and most of what Canadians knew about the trial came from the pens of Haig and Glaister. Haig supported the prosecution and his coverage essentially took the guilt of the accused for granted while Glaister was more sympathetic towards the defence. Glaister noted that Hall was always present in the courtroom in the visitor's benches, and he took a dislike of Hall as he looked more like a thuggish outlaw biker than the accused. Glaister came to suspect that there was something wrong about the Crown's case and that Hall had played a sinister role in the investigation.

=== Denis, Leon and Koehler on the stand ===
On 11 September 1979, Constable Denis was called to the stand as an expert witness by Meinhardt. On 12 September, Denis was cross-examined by the defence lawyer Bruce Affleck. Under oath, Denis admitted that the Port Hope 8 case was his first murder investigation; that he did not know much about murder investigations; and that he had made a few mistakes owing to his inexperience. Denis admitted that he had allowed group viewings of the photographs and that the red dots he placed on photographs of Comeau might had influenced the witnesses to name him as the killer, but insisted that he conducted an impartial and objective investigation. Denis conceded that it had been a mistake to allow group viewing of the photographs, and used ignorance as his defence, saying he did not know better at the time.

Kerbel in his cross-examination of Denis hammered him at why there were always red dots on the photos of Commeau and did not accept his explanation that it was to let the witnesses know there were other photographs under his photo as the photos of Comeau were smaller than the ones placed beneath. Kerbel was able to have Denis admit that he already viewed Comeau as the prime suspect and wanted to encourage the witnesses to pick out his photo via the red dots he always placed on his photos. Affleck felt that Kerbel should have stopped his cross-examination at that point, but he instead dragged out his cross-examination over three more days, during which he severely taxed the patience of the jury with his obsession on which date which witness picked which photo out of the array, which Affleck felt made the jury feel sympathy for Denis. Kerbel made the mistake of saying in response to an objection from Meinhardt "the point is not necessarily that someone else killed Mr. Matiyek", which both O'Hara and Affleck felt was a foolish statement for the defence counsel to make in front of the jury as it implied that Comeau was the killer after all. At that point, the defence team began to be caught up with in-fighting as Affleck felt that Kerbel was incompetent. The dysfunctional nature of the defence team worked to the advantage of the Crown as Meinhardt along with the junior Crown counsel Harris struck with one story-namely that all of the Port 8 were guilty. By contrast, the defence team told different stories with some of the defence lawyers implying the clients of the other defence lawyers were guilty.

On 24 September 1979, the Crown presented as a surprise witness, Lawrence Leon, the president of the now disbanded Golden Hawk Riders. Leon testified that in sometime in March or April 1978 that he been drinking at the Queen's Hotel with Matiyek when a group of Satan's Choice bikers led by Sauvé and Blaker arrived to threaten their lives. Leon testified that either Sauvé or Blaker (he was not certain which one) had warned him that if the Golden Hawk Riders did not cease their plans to join the Outlaws then none of the Golden Hawk Riders would live to see 1979. Under cross-examination from the defence lawyer Bruce Affleck, Leon admitted that his memory was poor and that the incident he described so vividly had happened in February 1978. Leon also changed his testimony as he now insisted without a doubt that the man who had threatened him was Sauvé. Leon admitted that he was in violation of the outlaw biker code to never testify against another biker even if the crime was committed against himself, but had done so because he was in fear of his life. Randy Koehler, a bouncer at the Queen's Hotel testified to an incident in December 1977 that he saw Matiyek brawl with seven Satan's Choice bikers first in the barroom and then in the men's washroom. However, under cross examination, Koehler admitted that Matiyek was the aggressor and the other Satan's Choice members had merely come to the aid of one of their own after Matiyek had punched him in the face. The incident where Matiyek shot up Sauvé's house and endangered the lives of his wife and daughter was not mentioned at the trial by either the Crown or the defence.

=== Davey, Goodwin, Gilispie, Foote and Mitchell on the stand ===
Sauvé's best friend and the best man at his wedding, Roger Davey, testified for a witness for the Crown that on the night of 18 October 1978, Sauvé had phoned him to tell his wife, Sharon Sauvé, that he would not be in Port Hope for the next few days and he could hear in the background a party going on to celebrate Matiyek's murder. Davey later admitted in 1985 that his testimony was perjury and that he did not speak with Sauvé on the night of the murder. Another witness for the Crown, William Goodwin-who was friend of Sauvé's-testified that Sauvé had told him several times in July 1978 that he was going to murder Matiyek in the near-future. The way that Goodwin appeared as a surprise witness for the Crown with Sauvé lawyer, Jack Grossman, only being informed the night before that Meinhardt was going to call him as a witness left the defence with no time to prepare. Grossman argued that Goodwin's testimony was hearsay as he had no evidence to collaborate his testimony and that Goodwin never contacted the police about Sauvé's alleged plans to kill Matiyek anytime before Matiyek's murder despite his claims to be appalled at the supposed murder plot. On 12 October 1979, when Goodwin was cross-examined by Newman, the young lawyer was aggressive in his questions and said "and the reason you are making a number of mistakes is that for reasons unknown to me, you are biased in giving your evidence here today in court?" Newman brought up that at a coffee shop named The Wooden Spoon that he was sitting close to the same table as Goodwin and overheard him say to a visiting teacher from Port Hope "I think we've got all eight of these guys for twenty-five years" and "my only wish is that these guys get twenty-five years". The exchange led to a shouting match with Justice Osborne threatening to fine both men for disorder in the courtroom. Goodwin admitted that he was at The Wooden Spoon at the time described by Newman and had spoken to the school teacher from Port Hope, but denied making the remarks.

Another witness for the Crown, David Gillispie, testified that he had heard overheard at the Queen's Hotel Comeau saying to Sauvé and Blaker "Are we going to do it to this fat fucker now or what?" just minutes before Matiyek was killed. Gillispie was a factory worker who liked to drink at the Queen's Hotel after finishing work, and had been present when Matiyek was killed. Gillispie further stated Sauvé and Blaker very much wanted to kill Matiyek as he recalled seeing the murderous looks on their faces while both men had told Comeau to kill Matiyek now. In response, the defence noted that in Gillispie's prior statements to the police made on 19 October 1978, 28 November 1978 and 29 December 1978 were contradictory as information in Gillispie's statements changed on a number of points in each statement. Gillispie admitted that his testimony at the trial in 1979 differed quite "substantially" from his previous statements in 1978, but he claimed that his changing statements were due to the fact that he was very drunk on the night of 18 October 1978 and that his memory of that night was hazy and clouded by alcohol. In Gillispie's first statement to the police on the morning of 19 October 1978, Comeau's "fat fucker" remark to Sauvé and Blaker concerned who was going to speak to Matiyek first, not who was to kill him. Gillispie claimed his first statement was wrong as he could not "remember" correctly what had happened due to his intoxicated state the previous night, but that he finally "remembered" what Comeau had really said to Sauvé and Blaker nearly a year later in 1979. When asked why Comeau had discussed the plan to kill Matiyek in front of him, Gillispie could give no explanation.

Susan Foote, a computer operator at the Ganaraska Credit Union who described herself as a "regular" at the Queen's Hotel testified that she was drinking alcohol and was watching the 1963 John Wayne film McClintock on the Queen's Hotel's TV when she saw Matiyek killed. Foote identified Sauvé, Blaker, Hoffman, McLeod, Comeau and Hurren as the Satan's Choice bikers present at the murder and stated that Sauvé was sitting to the left of Matiyek when he was shot. Affleck made much of the fact that in her testimony at the preliminary hearing Foote stated she may had known who McLeod was vs. her testimony at the trial when she stated she had known McLeod since 1974. Under cross-examination, she admitted that she did not know McLeod's name at the time of the murder as she had claimed at the preliminary hearing, and only learned McLeod's name in December 1978 when she saw his photograph in the newspapers. Foote was the roommate of Cotgrave and at the preliminary hearing she testified she had discussed the murder extensively with Cotgrave, but at the trial she testified she had "barely" talked about the murder with her.

Helen Ann Mitchell of Port Hope testified for the Crown that she had seen Comeau kill Matiyek and she identified Sauvé, Hurren, Hoffman and van Haarlem as being present at the murder. Mitchell was the only witness at the trial who identified van Haarlem as being present at the murder. The defence lawyers questioned whatever Mitchell was even present at the Queen's Hotel as her friend Foote testified she could not remember seeing her at the Queen's Hotel on 18 October and none of the police officers interviewed her at the crime scene. Mitchell was highly nervous as a witness and much of her testimony was vague as she claimed to have much difficulty remembering what had happened. Mitchell only came forward to the police on Christmas Day 1978 with her claim to have seen the murder, and she was confused about many about details in her testimony. Typical of Mitchell's testimony was her statement about when she first contacted the police: "Well, it was after October 18. It had to be, right? It could have been a month after, a week after, I don't know". Mitchell also admitted she knew van Haarlem and had last seen him in September 1978 wearing a "striker" patch when van Haarlem was already a "full patch" member of Satan's Choice. When questioned by Ebbs about this, Mitchell responded by saying: "I don't know if it was a striker's patch or a full member's patch because I get Tom, Tom I don't know what his last name is, him and Gord mixed up. I done that down at the police station".

=== Hall, McReelis and Cousens on the stand ===
Corporal Terry Hall testified that he was a leading expert on outlaw bikers, having given lectures on the subject in Canada, the United States and Australia. Hall further testified that he had seen Hoffman at the Kitchener clubhouse on the evening of 18 October 1978, but stated that he believed that Hoffman had gone to Port Hope after he left the clubhouse at about 8 pm, saying "I drove the 195 kilometres in one hour and 23 minutes". Martin in his cross-examination of Hall had admit him to make the trip described would have required Hoffman to drive at 160 km/hour, well in excess of the speed limits. McReelis during his testimony denied having been aware of a bullet arm in Comeau's arm and denied during the search of the house of Betty King (Comeau's mother) on 10 January 1979 having asked about Comeau's jacket. Cousens testified that he was aware of a wound in Comeau's arm, but that he did not think it was a gunshot wound, only to be contradicted by his own notes, which showed he described Comeau's arm wound as an entrance wound. Under cross-examination from Kerbel, Cousens stated that both he and Hall were aware that the witnesses had mentioned that one of the bikers had been shot in the arm, but "I didn't attach much importance to it at the time".

=== Thompson, Cotgrave and Hanna on the stand ===
Gayle Thompson, the chief waitress at the Queen's Hotel, testified for the Crown that it was Comeau who had killed Matiyek. She testified that shortly before 11 pm on 18 October 1978, she saw a group of Satan's Choice bikers arrive at the Queen's Hotel, none of whom she knew except for Sauvé and Blaker whom she recognized on sight. She admitted during the investigation that she had at first said that Comeau "could" have been the gunman and only identified Comeau as the gunman at the preliminary hearing, but now insisted that her memory was clear. Under cross-examination by the defence lawyer Howard Kerbel, Thompson testified: "He [the killer] had on a green parka coat with a hood that he wasn't wearing. It had fur around the hood and either a black or navy blue-coloured, I think woolen or knitted type of toque". When Kerbel asked Thompson if she could see the killer's hair under the toque, she testified "of course not!", which contradicted her earlier testimony that she saw that the killer had blonde hair like Comeau. Thompson was most adamant in her testimony that the killer had opened fire on Matiyek with the gun in his left hand.

Cotgrave testified for the prosecution and stated she saw Comeau kill Matiyek, saying "there was no doubt in my mind at all" that Comeau was the killer. She testified that the killer opened fire with the gun in his left hand. However, when asked to point out Comeau in the courtroom she pointed to McLeod as she maintained that he was Comeau and her description of the killer as a man with thinning red hair matched McLeod, not Comeau. Cotgrave admitted she was high on marijuana at the time of the murder, but maintained stubbornly her memory of the murder was accurate. Cotgrave was the only witness who had named Sanguigni as being present at the murder as she testified that she saw him in the pinball room arguing with the Outlaw Fred Jones, and Sanguigni's lawyer Bernard Cugelman hammered her during his cross-examination as he maintained that her marijuana use had affected her memory. Cotgrave broke down in tears during the cross-examination, and the sight of a 19-year-old woman being badgered by Cugelman earned her the jury's sympathy. On 9 October 1979, Matiyek's girlfriend, Jamie Hanna, testified that Sauvé had ordered her away from Matiyek's table shortly before he was shot. She testified that the killer was a tall man with long blonde hair and a blonde moustache. All of the witnesses had placed Sauvé at Matiyek's table at the time of the murder, but in different places. Thompson had testified that Sauvé was sitting to the right of Matiyek at the time of the shooting; Cotgrave and Foote had Sauvé sitting to the left of Matiyek and Hanna had Sauvé standing to the left of Matiyek. Sauvé himself has stated he was sitting opposite of Matiyek when he was killed. Lawyers and psychologists have the concept of "the inherent fragility of eyewitness identification" to describe the way that people who witness the same event will have broadly the same memories of it, but will differ in important details, and Lowe wrote that the Port Hope 8 trial was an excellent example of "the inherent fragility of eyewitness identification" as the eyewitnesses all differed in their recollections of the murder.

=== Stewart on the stand ===
Another witness for the Crown was Rod Stewart, a building contractor and a member of the Port Hope town council who been drinking at the Queen's Hotel on the night of the murder. Stewart testified how Matiyek in the last moments of his life seemed frightened and had said to him as he was walking back from the pay phone booth to his table that "it feels very lonely here". Unlike the other witnesses, Stewart described the Satan's Choice bikers acting together in co-ordination as he described them as forming a "horseshoe" formation that advanced towards Matiyek's table, which was followed by his murder. Stewart stated he could identify Hoffman from amongst the accused as he maintained that he had seen Hoffman on the night of the murder, but was unable to identify any of the other accused. Stewart testified: "Mr. Hoffman stands out like a sore thumb because he's got that lovely pigtail, and that's why I identified him". Stewart was the only witness who described the "horseshoe" formation advancing towards Matiyek, which Thompson, Cotgrave, Hanna and Foote denied having seen. When being cross-examined by Harris, Stewart broke down in tears, saying that the reality of murder was far more horrific and bloody than the glamorized depictions of violence in Hollywood films. Stewart testified that it was horrifying to watch a man being killed and that the amount of blood that flowed out of Matiyek's corpse was far worse than what Hollywood portrayed murder as.

Affleck thought that Stewart's breakdown on the stand made the jury sympathize with him. Affleck regarded Stewart as an excellent witness for the Crown, stating he was intelligent, handsome, articulate, stylishly dressed, and very self-confident, making him into the sort of witness that jurors trust. Affleck felt that Kerbel's attempt at cross-examining Stewart was comically inept. During the cross-examination, Kerbel made a reference to the "horseshoe around Julius Caesar" before he realized that a reference to Caesar's assassination on the Ides of March in 44 BC was actually helping the Crown's case. Under cross-examination from Kerbel, Stewart admitted that his accounts of the murder differed very much from the other men with him, Peter Murdock and Peter LeBrash. as he testified: "It seems to me there were discrepancies...and we found that surprising. What we found so surprising was that we all saw different things at the same event". Martin noted that Stewart had failed to identify anyone when looking at the photo arrays, but Stewart insisted that he saw Hoffman at the Queen's Hotel. It was revealed under cross-examination from O'Hara that Stewart from where he was sitting at the bar could not had easily seen Matiyek's table as there was a large column in the way and the chairs did not swirl, leading to a lengthy debate about what Stewart could have possibly seen from his vantage point on a non-swirling chair facing away from Matiyek's table. Stewart stated that he happened to turn his entire body around at the precise moment that he saw the "horseshoe" advance along with the murder.

=== Failed plea bargain talks ===
After Stewart testified, Meinhardt approached Affleck about making a plea bargain, saying that the outcome of the trial was evenly balanced between the jury voting to convict vs. voting to acquit. Under English common law, all 12 jurors must vote to convict and Meinhardt seemed uncertain if that would be possible with some of the Port Hope 8. Meinhardt told Affleck that if Sauvé would admit to being the mastermind behind Matiyek's murder and Comeau would admit to being the killer, the Crown was willing to accept a plea bargain where Sauvé and Comeau would serve 14 years in prison. As for the rest of the Port Hope 8, Meinhardt was willing to make plea bargains where they would serve 7 years in prison. Meinhardt's plea bargain offer caused a great deal of dispute among the Port Hope 8. The cases against Sanguigni and van Haarlem were weak, and so both men favoured rejecting the Crown's offer out of the hope that the jury would vote to acquit. Hoffman wanted to reject the offer because he had been in Kitchener, but on the other hand a number of the Crown's witnesses such as Thompson, Cotgrave and Stewart had named him as one of the killers. Ultimately, Hoffman chose to reject the offer, saying he was unwilling to admit to a crime that he had not committed. Sauvé and Comeau who both faced life imprisonment if convicted favoured accepting the Crown's offer, saying it was better to serve 14 years in prison than to spend the rest of their lives in prison. Affleck made a counter-offer under which Comeau would plead guilty to manslaughter while the charges would be dropped against Sanguigni and van Haarlem and the rest would make guilty pleas to wounding. Meinhardt was willing to accept the offer, but wanted the accused to sign a statement linking the murder of Matiyek to the on-going biker war in Quebec between the Outlaws vs. the Hells Angels, and for the accused to say that the Hells Angels were behind Matiyek's murder, a demand rejected by all of the Port Hope 8.

=== Nielsen on the stand ===
Dr. Finn Nielsen, a forensic expert testified as an expert witness that Matiyek had been killed by three shots fired from a 9 millimeter revolver. Meinhardt asked Dr. Nielsen the odd question: "Does that assist you at all as to whether there would be one or more persons who could have inflicted such wounds on the deceased?" Nielsen replied that it was not possible to determine if there was more than one gunmen and all he could say that was Matiyek was killed by three shots fired from the same gun. Up until then, the Crown's thesis was that Sauvé was the mastermind and that Comeau was the killer, and Meinhardt's attempts to have Nielsen say that there was more than one gunman firing the same gun marked an important shift in the Crown's thesis. Comeau was and still is convinced that the police knew he had been shot at the Queen's Hotel based on McReelis's remark to his mother in January 1979 that "We think Gary got shot" along with his jacket that mysteriously vanished after McReelis had seized it, and that he had been framed. Kerbel during his cross-examination of Neilsen had him admit that there was a bullet hole in the jacket sleeve of the coat that Matiyek was wearing when he was killed, and that the missing third bullet from the crime scene would likely have microscopic fibers from the said coat wrapped around it.

=== Campbell on the stand and the "boomerang bullet" ===
Comeau's lawyer, Howard Kerbel, a Toronto lawyer who often defended members of Satan's Choice, was contacted by members of the Toronto chapter who told him that Campbell was willing to testify for the defence that he killed Matiyek. Terry O'Hara, the lawyer for Blaker, was highly critical of the way that Kerbel kept Campbell's appearance before the jury a secret from his fellow defence counsel until the last moment, and that there was no attempt to prepare Campbell for the stand.

On 25 October 1979, Campbell testified for the defence that he had killed Matiyek and the eight accused were innocent. Under the Canada Evidence Act, Campbell enjoyed a limited immunity as he could not be charged with murder on the basis of his statements made on the stand, but could be charged if other evidence emerged to incriminate him. Campbell testified: "I pulled out my gun and shot him for my own protection. I didn't want to get shot". In support of his testimony, Campbell showed that he owned a green parka coat that matched the description given by the witnesses of the green parka coat worn by the killer. Campbell had been convicted of perjury once and as a result, the jury distrusted him. Campbell strongly disliked Meinhardt whom he considered to be "pompous" and had much difficulty controlling his rage as Meinhardt brought up Campbell's perjury conviction as a way to discredit him to the jury. Meinhardt asked Campbell: "And so not only did you go into the box and tell a lie, you have somebody else go in for you to tell a lie?", which Campbell confirmed. Meinhardt further asked "And this was for a driving offense?", which Campbell again confirmed. Under the advice of Affleck, Campbell had taken a number of Valium pills before he testified to calm his nerves, and as a result Campbell spoke on the stand in a flat, emotionless tone that made it appear that he was reading a script. O'Hara stated: "His testimony was completely flat, delivered in a monotone, with no humanity and without the slightest emotion. He seemed like an automaton sent to do a job". In a remark to the jury, Justice Counter Osborne accused Campbell of perjury as he stated he "kept waiting for the cue cards to appear" during Campbell's testimony. In contrast to Campbell's testimony, Meinhardt named Comeau as the man who fired the three shots that killed Matiyek. Several witnesses mentioned that the man who killed Matiyek was a tall man with long blonde hair, described as a "big, blonde, bearded guy". Meinhardt noted that Comeau had long blonde hair while Campbell had long brown hair, which led him to argue that Campbell was guilty of perjury again. Affleck stated Campbell looked nothing like the tall blonde man whom the Crown witnesses stated had killed Matiyek while Comeau did resemble the tall blonde man. The witnesses all stated that the man who killed Matiyek was left-handed; Campbell was left-handed while all of the "Port Hope 8" were right-handed.

Some of the evidence that emerged during the trial, such as the fact that the same bullet that killed Matiyek was found lodged inside of the body of one of the accused, Comeau, supported the defence. The police had found two bullets at the crime scene, but the first bullet that went through Matiyek's neck was still missing. Campbell testified about Comeau: "I had seen by his coat that he [Comeau] was hurt. His coat had a hole in it and there was blood there". In response to a motion from Kerbel, Justice Osborne ordered that Comeau be taken to a hospital to have the bullet removed from his arm to see if it had been fired from the same gun as that which had killed Matiyek. On 31 October 1979, Comeau visited the Victoria hospital in London to have the bullet that had struck him on 18 October 1978 removed from his body, which was then handed over for a ballistic test, which confirmed that the bullet was fired from the same gun as the two other bullets that had killed Matiyek found at the crime scene. Found alongside the bullet inside Comeau's arm was a piece of threading from the coat Matiyek was wearing when he was killed. For Comeau to be the killer as Meinhardt had claimed would have required the bullet to perform an impossible feat, namely go through Matiyek's neck and then boomerang in mid-air to come back and strike Comeau.

The defence lawyers argued that Comeau could not have possibly fired the same bullet that went through Matiyek's neck that also ended in his side, leading the prosecution to change its thesis midway through the trial to now claim that there had been two gunmen instead of one as first claimed and despite the fact that all of the witnesses stated there had been only one gunman. Comeau's jacket that he was wearing on the night of the murder could have supported his story of being shot in the upper left arm as it had a bullet hole, but his jacket had been seized by the police after his arrest and mysteriously vanished with the police saying that they had lost the jacket. Peter Edwards, the crime correspondent of The Toronto Star stated about the Crown's theory of two gunmen: "Rubbish. How does Gary Comeau end up getting a bullet in him with Bill's clothing on it? I can't begin to believe that. There wasn't any second guy at all. The police work was horrible. You have to remember this was the pre-DNA era, and we didn't have that security blanket of forensic testing. The Gary Comeau conviction (for Matiyek's murder) in today's terms is just beyond laughable. That's like a bad Perry Mason story."

=== Hoffman and van Haarlem on the stand ===
Hoffman took to the stand to testify that he spent the night of 18 October 1978 in Kitchener repairing the door to the Satan's Choice clubhouse that had been kicked in by the police on a raid to look for drugs (none were found). Hoffman testified that he went home at about 10:30 pm and was woken up at about 2:00 am by Comeau, Blaker and Sauvé as Comeau had been shot in the arm. Meinhardt during his cross-examination of Hoffman was able to have him admit that he had been the treasurer of Satan's Choice Kitchener chapter from the fall of 1967 onward, and that all of the witnesses who testified that he was in Kitchener on 18 October were fellow members of his chapter. Meinhardt brought up that Mitchell, Stewart, Cotgrave, Thompson and Foote had all testified that they had seen him at the Queen's Hotel on the night of the murder in an attempt to break his alibi as Meinhardt made much that only men with criminal records had testified that Hoffman was in Kitchener. Seven witnesses collaborated Hoffman's alibi with all having testified that they Hoffman was at work until about 10: 30 pm on 18 October 1978. During the cross-examination of Hoffman's alibi witnesses, Meinhardt made much of the fact that Hoffman's witnesses had criminal records, and he advised the jury to disregard their testimony as accused all of the witnesses of perjury. Colleen Misener, the owner of the Costumes by Colleen costume shop in Stratford and the chairwoman of the Stratford Police Commission testified she spoke with the phone with Hoffman on evening of 18 October about renting costumes to him for a Halloween party, which made it unlikely that Hoffman could had driven to Port Hope that night.

During the trial, it emerged that one of the accused, Gordon van Haarlem, had a solid alibi for where he was at the time of the murder as van Haarlem had been drinking at the King George Hotel in Peterbourgh from about 8:30 pm to 1:30 am on 18 October 1978. Numerous witnesses testified that van Haarlem had been at the King George Hotel, none of whom had criminal records or associations with Satan's Choice. The principle evidence that Meinhardt was able to present in support of the Crown's thesis that van Haarlem was one of the killers was that Mitchell had picked his photograph out of the photo arrays shown by Constable Denis and van Haarlem had a lengthy criminal record including convictions for assault, mischief, possession of an unregistered gun, theft, possession of narcotic, and possession of narcotics with the intention of trafficking.

O'Hara urged Blaker to take the stand in his own defence, warning him that jurors tended to convict defendants who chose not to testify in their own defence. In addition, O'Hara warned Blaker that the all-white jury was biased against him for being Ojibwe, and it would be best for him to take the stand. O'Hara felt that Blaker's easy-going, friendly personality would change the jury's opinion of him. However, Blaker did not want to break the outlaw biker code by testifying that Campbell had killed Matiyek as outlaw bikers are supposed to never incriminate another outlaw biker in a crime, and chose not to testify in his defence, even after O'Hara had him sign a statement saying he would be likely to be convicted if he did not take the stand.

=== Final submissions to the jury ===
On 9 November 1979, Affleck gave his final submission to the jury where he noted that only Foote and Cotgrave had identified McLeod as being present at the murder. Affleck noted that Cotgrave had McLeod sitting at the table when Matiyek was killed while Hanna denied that he had been at the table when her boyfriend was killed, leading him to argue that Cotgrave was an unreliable witness. Affleck noted that Foote had differed in her testimony as she testified she had never seen McLeod at the preliminary hearing, but at the trial she had. David Newman, the lawyer for Hurren, adopted an unorthodox strategy in his final submission of linking a theme to the surname of each juror. Thus, Newman told the juror Sandra Johnson she should think of J for Justice, Laura Lippold should think of L for logic, Edgar Gudgeon should think of G for gunman, and Albert Kanters should think of K for knowledge. Justice Osborne rebuked Newman for his final submission as he urged each member of the jury to only consider one aspect of the case whereas under English common law all jurors are supposed to consider all of the case in its entirety. Osborne also told the jury to disregard Newman's final submission for violating English common law. Affleck was furious with Newman's tactic, which he considered to be idiotic in the extreme and cursed Newman as a young, inexperienced lawyer fresh out of law school whose blundering had just badly alienated the jury. The identity of jurors are supposed to be a secret, but anything said in the courtroom can be quoted by the media; Newman by saying the names of the jurors in his closing argument had reveled their identities to the media, which Affleck considered to be an exceptionally stupid thing to do. Affleck told O'Hara that after working with Newman that he would never work again with inexperienced defence counsel as he felt Newman's final submission had just doomed the defence case.

On 12 November 1979, Kerbel in his final submission noted that both Cotgrave and Thompson had testified that they saw Comeau shoot Matiyek but the "boomerang bullet" found in Comeau's arm proved that he did not kill Matiyek. Kerbel argued that the jury should not convict Comeau on the basis of such evidence. Grossman in his final submission argued that it made no sense for Sauvé to be involved in a murder at the Queen's Hotel given he was so well known there and that Cotgrave and Thompson had identified him by name to the police immediately after the murder. In his final submission, Martin used the "boomerang bullet" to try to win an acquittal for Hoffman, saying that the same witnesses who testified that they saw Comeau shoot Matiyek had also testified that Hoffman was at the Queen's Hotel. Martin argued it was illogical that Hoffman "went to Port Hope...at speeds up to 100 miles per hour...to become involved in something that did not concern him...and did not concern the Kitchener chapter of his club". O'Hara felt that Martin had delivered a bad closing argument as he failed to note there were no phone records of Sauvé calling Hoffman or the Kitchener clubhouse on 18 October 1978. O'Hara noted that the Crown's thesis was that Sauvé was the mastermind of the alleged plot to kill Matiyek and Meinhardt had used the fact that the phone records showed that Sauvé had called every member of the Peterborough and Oshawa chapters before calling the Toronto clubhouse as evidence in support of that thesis.

Cugelman in his final submission urged the jury to acquit Sanguigni under the grounds that only Cotgrave had testified to seeing him at the Queen's Hotel and she was high on marihuana at the time, saying no jury should convict him on such evidence. On 13 November 1979, Donald Ebbs, the lawyer for van Haarlem, gave his final submission to the jury. Ebbs stated that several witnesses had testified that van Haarlem had been drinking at the King George Hotel in Peterborough on the night of the murder, and that none of those witnesses were members of Satan's Choice or had criminal records. Ebbs was making an obvious reference to the alibi witnesses for Hoffman who were members of Satan's Choice with the implication that the testimony of law-abiding citizens should be preferred over those of outlaw bikers. Hoffman was upset that Ebbs was trying to discredit his alibi witnesses to win acquittal for van Haarlem, who was likewise ashamed of his lawyer's closing argument. Ebb's tactics nearly caused a brawl amongst the defence lawyers afterwards with the feeling being that Ebbs had put the interests of his client above the others.

O'Hara in his final submission urged the jury to consider the case "the way the world works" as he argued it made no sense for Blaker to be involved in a murder at the Queen's Hotel where he was very well known to both the staff and patrons. Like Grossman, O'Hara noted that both Cotgrave and Thompson named him to the police immediately after the murder, which led O'Hara to conclude that Blaker had not gone to the Queen's Hotel with the intention of murdering Matiyek. O'Hara argued that given "the way the world works" that the only logical explanation was that Blaker had gone to the Queen's Hotel with no murder planned on his mind. O'Hara urged the jury to accept Campbell's testimony as he argued counterintuitively that Campbell's perjury conviction proved he was telling the truth. O'Hara noted that Meinhardt had accused Campbell of having falsely confessed to a murder committed by Comeau, leading O'Hara to ask why Satan's Choice would volunteer someone to play-act with a perjury conviction. O'Hara stated that any Satan's Choice biker could had falsely confessed to killing Matiyek on the stand and that Campbell's perjury conviction damaged his credibility as a witness, leading him to argue that Campbell was indeed telling the truth when he confessed to killing Matiyek.

In his final submission to the jury on 14 November 1979, Meinhardt contended the killing of Matiyek was a planned, cold-blooded execution and that all those involved were "equally guilty of murder". Meinhardt stated there is a concept in English common law of "constructive first-degree murder" under which those who did not kill themselves, but whose actions caused a murder to take place are just guilty of those who committed the killing. Meinhardt stated seven eyewitnesses had named Sauvé as present at the murder; six had named Blaker; five had named Comeau and another five Hoffman; four had identified Hurren; two had named McLeod; one had identified Sanguigni and another one had named van Haarlem. As proof of premeditation, Meinhardt recalled the testimony of Gillespie who claimed to have overheard Comeanu asking Sauvé and Blaker "are you we going to do it to this fat fucker now or what?", which Meinhardt stated was the "clarion call to action". Meinhardt accepted Stewart's claim to have seen the "horseshoe formation" advance towards Matiyek's table as further evidence of a planned killing. About the "boomerang bullet", Meinhardt used it as evidence that Comeau was indeed at the Queen's Hotel, and claimed there were two gunmen, thought he admitted that all of the witnesses saw only one gunman. Meinhardt spent much of his closing argument attacking Campbell's testimony. Meinhardt stated that Campbell had been a member of Satan's Choice since 1965; had a very long criminal record and had been convicted of perjury in 1977, leading for Meinhardt to urge the jury to treat Campbell's testimony "with all the contempt it deserves". Meinhardt noted that O'Hara in his closing argument had urged the jurors to consider the evidence "the way the world works" in a commonsensical way, but Meinhardt turned that argument on its head as he stated the accused were outlaw bikers whom he called vicious, brutal, animalistic criminals devoid of common sense and intelligence. Meinhardt stated that O'Hara had claimed it made no sense for Blaker and Sauvé to be part of a murder at the Queen's Hotel were both men were well known, but he argued that outlaw bikers were animalistic men utterly incapable of common sense, leading him to conclude given "the way the world works" that it did make sense for Blaker and Sauvé to go to the Queen's Hotel with murder on their minds.

=== Glaister's trip to Port Hope ===
Glaister, the journalist covering the trial for Maclean's had become convinced that the accused were innocent and that Terry Hall had acted outside of the law. He had planned to write an article for Maclean's entitled "The Biggest Gang of All" on the Special Squad and on 16 November 1979 visited Port Hope with the aim of gathering material for his article. He visited the Walton Hotel as the Queen's Hotel had been renamed after Matiyek's murder, and found it to be a dark and ominous bar. Afterwards, he went to the Ganaraska Hotel where he met with Rod Stewart, the town councilor who had testified for the Crown. Stewart told Glaister that his tears on the stand were feigned, saying he deserved "an Academy Award for best actor" for his performance on the stand as he stated he very much wanted to see the Port Hope 8 convicted and was willing to do anything to ensure that happened. While Glaister was taking a call in the phone booth from Toronto, Stewart stole Glaister's notes for his article, which he apparently saw as his duty to prevent from appearing. On 11 January 1980, Stewart made a plea bargain with the Crown where he pleaded guilty to mischief for stealing Glaister's notes.

=== Conclusion ===
On 24 November 1979, the jury announced its verdict. Sauvé and Comeau were convicted of first degree murder while Blaker, McLeod, Hurren and Hoffman were convicted of second degree murder. Two of the accused, Armand Sanguigni and Gordon van Haarlem, were acquitted. Glasiter and Haig often argued about the merits of the Crown's case, but were disappointed by Sanguigni's acquittal as he was the most sinister of the accused and they both kept hearing rumors about his career as a Mafia hitman. The conviction of six of the eight accused of Matiyek's murder despite Campbell's testimony on the witness stand that he had killed him was highly controversial in 1979 and remains so. At the time, a journalist, Douglas Glasiter, wrote "Who actually fired the gun was never established..." at the trial. Comeau and Sauvé were convicted of first-degree murder as the jury accepted the Crown's claims that Comeau was the killer and Sauvé the mastermind while the other four were convicted of second-degree murder. The private detective Mike O'Brien wrote about the trial: "The unmistakable horror of Regina vs. McLeod et al is that because of the accused's affiliations, they are lesser human beings being less worthy of their human rights as promised by the general principles of law of that day recognized by the community of nations; and certainly by the subsequent Canadian Charter of Rights and Freedoms, i.e.: s. 11 '[Any person charged with an offence has the right] (d) to be presumed innocent until proven guilty according to law in a fair and public hearing by an independent and impartial tribunal.'"

Sauvé saw his wife Sharon and daughter Angela for the last time to say goodbye amid their tears. Comeau was asked by a policeman as he was taken to prison about what had happened to his missing leather jacket with the bullet hole, leading to him to reply "you ask McReelis, he'll know". Two of the convicted, Sauvé and Blaker, came from the Choice's Peterborough chapter. At the same time, another four members of the Choice's Peterborough chapter were also convicted of separate charges relating to a gang-rape. The Peterborough chapter, which was already the weakest chapter, was effectively destroyed as a result of losing six members to the prisons, being reduced down to a shadowy existence. The Queen's Hotel was renamed the Walton Hotel to avoid the associations with the murder. The Walton Hotel has since been converted into a condo and is now known as the Walton Residence.

== The cause célèbre ==
Brian Greenspan, the lawyer for Hoffmann (who fired Martin after his conviction), were able in 1981 to prove on the basis of police intercepts of Hoffmann's telephone calls that he was making phone calls in Kitchener on the night of 18 October 1978 and thus was not in Port Hope as the prosecution had claimed at the trial. The fact that the police had these intercepts all along was controversial and Lowe feels that Hoffmann should never have been charged with Matiyek's murder, let alone convicted. Hoffman was the treasurer of the Choice chapter in Kitchener and had known Hall since 1974, having very unfriendly relations with him. Hoffmann was indicted for murder as a way to pressure him to turn Crown's evidence and testify against his club. In 1983, Hoffmann was acquitted on an appeal, with a judge ruling that the Crown had acted badly by not disclosing to Hoffman's lawyer that it had the audio tapes proving he was in Kitchener the night of the murder.

Terry O'Hara, the lawyer for Blaker noted that he lived in Port Hope at the time of Matiyek's murder and was well known to both the patrons and staff of the Queen's Hotel, where he often drank. O'Hara argued that the Crown's thesis that Matiyek's murder was a case of first-degree murder was illogical as Blaker was well known to the staff of Queen's Hotel who had no difficulty in identifying him to the police as one of the Satan's Choice members present when Matiyek was killed. O'Hara wrote that if the Crown's thesis of a premediated killing was correct, then Satan's Choice would not have assigned someone very well known at the Queen's Hotel for such a task, and instead assigned someone who was unknown at the Queen's Hotel. For all these reasons, O'Hara asked the Ontario Court of Appeal for a review of Blaker's conviction in 1985, which was refused. In 1986, a petition in Port Hope asking for a review of Blaker's conviction for second-degree murder was signed by 232 people in Port Hope who stated that Blaker was an easy-going member of Satan's Choice not known for being violent.

The Port Hope case became the subject of a best-selling 1988 book, A Conspiracy of Brothers by the American journalist Mick Lowe, and the 1990 protest song Justice in Ontario by the American singer Steve Earle. The "Port Hope 8" case became a cause célèbre in the 1980s–1990s, attracting even international attention. Lowe charged that there was a police conspiracy to frame the accused, noting that exculpatory evidence, such as Comeau's jacket that would have supported his story that he had been shot, mysteriously disappeared after the police seized it. In 1988, the Oshawa chapter president Campbell served as a guest lecturer at the University of Ottawa law school class, where he spoke about the Port Hope case as a miscarriage of justice, becoming the first and only Satan's Choice chapter president to ever give a university lecture. A committee led by Comeau's sister Carol Crosby and mother Betty King campaigned to free the wrongly convicted "Port Hope 8" bikers, publishing a newsletter that had subscribers in Canada, the United States, Sweden, the United Kingdom and Japan. The supporters of the six imprisoned bikers in both Canada and abroad were overwhelmingly women with the majority being younger women. The issue was debated on the floor of the House of Commons as the NDP MP Svend Robinson and the Liberal MPs Warren Allmand and Christine Stewart all charged that the case was a miscarriage of justice. The 1990 song Justice in Ontario which compared the Port Hope 8 case to the Black Donnelly massacre of 1880 and its picture of Canada as a cruel, unjust society caused much controversy in 1990–1991. Earle was warned not to perform Justice in Ontario in Canada, but he did so anyway in a tour of Canada in 1991. On 30 June 1991, Earle played Justice In Ontario at a high-profile Ottawa concert. Earle told the audience: "These guys have been locked away pushing thirteen years, and I truly believe that they're innocent. The thing that irritates me is not the matter of someone else's different opinion, it's their complete and total indifference to the situation".

In 1990, the Conservative Justice Minister, Kim Campbell, appointed a commission under Donald Avison to reexamine the Port Hope 8 case. In December 1990 Campbell reached her conclusions that all of the accused were indeed guilty and there was no miscarriage of justice. The Crown's report stated that Comeau killed Matiyek and explained away the contradiction of the "boomerang bullet" by concluding one of the bullets that Comeau was alleged to have fired went through Matiyek's neck and somehow by means unknown to science turned around in mid-air to come back to strike Comeau in the arm. In response, Lorne Campbell in an interview with the journalist Timothy Appleby of the Globe & Mail made later in December 1990 once again confessed that he had killed Matiyek and begged the Crown to charge him with Matiyek's murder. Unlike his statements on the stand during the trial in 1979, Campbell was not protected by the Canada Evidence Act and he could have had been charged with murder on the basis of his interview with Appleby that was published on the front page of the Globe & Mail. Campbell told Appleby that he was well aware that he was not protected by the Canada Evidence Act, but he had once again confessed to the murder because innocent men were serving life sentences for a crime he had committed. In his biography, Unrepentant by Peter Edwards published in May 2013, Campbell once again confessed to killing Matieyk and stated that he was willing to be charged with murder on the basis of his statements.

On 5 December 1991, Joe Bastos, one of the lawyers for Merv Blaker told a private detective who summarized his statement as: "The group jerked around for a long time before producing the gunman. Finally Campbell was brought forward, he was a real space cadet, he was always stoned. Thinks Sanguigni might have been the gunman". A number of other wrongly convicted people such as Rubin "Hurricane" Carter, Donald Marshall Jr., and David Milgaard were all active in speaking at rallies for the "Port Hope 8" in the 1990s. At one such rally in 1995 in Toronto, Campbell confessed in a speech to killing Matiyek, and received much applause. The last of the "Port Hope 8" to be released was Comeau, who was freed on 8 September 2000. The Port Hope case is routinely taught in Canadian law schools as a textbook example of a miscarriage of justice.

In a 2003 interview, McReelis still insisted upon the guilt of the Port Hope 8 and said of Lowe's book: "I've read the book and I guess everyone is entitled to their own opinion. I don't happen to agree with his opinions...I feel justice was served but I still feel sorry for the victim's family. They lost a son". Lowe stated in a 2013 interview: “I think I have become more convinced than ever that this is arguably the most egregious case of wrongful conviction in the annals of Canadian justice. And if the public loses faith in its own Canadian justice system, the entire system starts to rot from within. It's like rust, it's truly corrosive. And most people who become acquainted with the Port Hope Eight story are incredulous that such a thing could happen".

Of the Port Hope 8, Armand Sanguigni died of a heroin overdose on 8 October 1984, a death that is considered to be suspicious. Larry Hurren was released on parole in 1989 and was killed in a motorcycle accident on 30 July 1996. Gordon van Haarlem left Satan's Choice after the trial and moved to Alberta. Jeff McLeod was released on full parole in 1989 and is now a free man. Merv Blaker was released on full parole in 1989 and resumed his career as a mechanic. To obtain full parole, Blaker had to leave Satan's Choice. David Hoffman was acquitted of second-degree murder on appeal in 1983, but found guilty of being an accessory after the fact to murder. Hoffman was released in 1987 and resumed his career with B.F. Goodrich. In December 2000, when Satan's Choice joined the Hells Angels, Hoffman resigned as he did not want to join the Hells Angels and now lives in Kitchener. Richard Sauvé became a noted social activist who in the 1993 case Regina vs. Sauvé decided before the Supreme Court of Canada won the right for prisoners to vote as Sauvé successfully argued that the law that disfranchised prisoners' from voting violated the Charter of Rights and Freedoms. Sauvé was released on full parole on 1 March 1995 and now lives on a farm near Lindsay with his second wife. Gary Comeau was released on full parole on 8 September 2000. Comeau still maintains his innocence and is at present suing the government of Ontario for a full exoneration and for an apology as the Crown still maintains that Comeau killed Matiyek.

== Books ==
- Auger, Michel; Edwards, Peter (2012). The Encyclopedia of Canadian Organized Crime: From Captain Kidd to Mom Boucher. Toronto: McClelland & Stewart. ISBN 978-0771030499.
- Edwards, Peter (2013). Unrepentant The Strange and (Sometimes) Terrible Life of Lorne Campbell, Satan's Choice and Hells Angels Biker. Toronto: Vintage Canada. ISBN 9780307362575.
- Edwards, Peter (2017). Hard Road: Bernie Guindon and the Reign of the Satan's Choice Motorcycle Club. Toronto: Random House. ISBN 978-0345816108.
- Langton, Jerry (2010). Showdown: How the Outlaws, Hells Angels and Cops Fought for Control of the Streets. Toronto: John Wiley & Sons. ISBN 978-0470678787.
- Lowe, Mick (2013). A Conspiracy of Brothers: A True Story of Bikers, Murder and the Law. Toronto: Vintage Canada. ISBN 978-0345813169.
