= Armand Sanguigni =

Canadian gangster

Armand Sanguigni (1951 – 8 October 1984) was a Canadian outlaw biker, gangster, and hitman for the Cotroni family who was one of the accused in the Port Hope 8 case.

== Satan's Choice hitman ==
Sanguigni was born into a family of Italian immigrants in what is now Mississauga. He joined the Toronto chapter of Satan's Choice Motorcycle Club in 1969. A heroin addict, Sanguigni along with his fellow biker, Ken Goobie, was known as one of the loudest advocates of having Satan's Choice enter the business of selling heroin. The hitman Cecil Kirby recalled in his 1986 memoir Mafia Enforcer: "Armand Sanguigni was Goobie's number - one guy, his trusted courier and distributor . I became his banker and sometime courier.". Sanguigni worked as a hitman for the Cotroni family of Montreal. Bernie Guindon, the president of Satan's Choice, said of Sanguigni: "I didn't have much to do with those guys. I was from Oshawa. They were trying to make a living as well". Guindon stated that he was aware of Sanguigni's work for the Cotroni family, but that he was not involved. Sanguigni's friend, Howard "Pigpen" Berry said of him: "He was a good guy. I got along good with him. I didn't agree with the homicide part".

On 9 March 1973, Sanguigni killed William Lee Graham, a 21-year-old man who was one of the Crown's main witnesses against a group of Satan's Choice bikers on trial in Toronto for drug charges. Graham had been spotted by a group of Satan's Choice bikers at a Toronto motorcycle shop, was kidnapped, beaten, and while still alive his body was weighted down and dumped into the waters of Rice Lake outside of Peterborough by Sanguigni, where he drowned. Kirby stated: "I was later told of it by Armand himself". Graham's corpse was found on 27 May 1973, which led Sanguigni to complain that he should have weighted Graham with heavier weights to keep him on the bottom of Rice Lake. Besides for Graham's murder, Sanguigni was the prime suspect in 11 other murders.

Sanguigni's usual partner in robbing homes and businesses was Gerard Michael Vaughan, a vicious rapist who was later found not guilty by reason of insanity for series of brutal sexual assaults on Toronto area women. Sanguigni and Vaughan specialized in robbing jewelry stores in the Toronto area. Kirby stated that Vaughan did not rape women in the presence of Sanguigni as he said: "Armand Sanguigni was not the type of person to be raping women". Kirby described Sanguigni as a hitman who felt no guilt about killing people, but stated that Sanguigni was very old-fashioned in refusing to rape women or allowing others to rape in his presence. Lorne Campbell who had known both Sanguigni and Goobie recalled the duo's thesis about the virtues of selling heroin at a club meeting as: "Their argument was that they snorted heroin and they didn't have a problem with it". Sanguigni was known as "In the trunk" because he always had something illegal to sell out of the trunk of his automobile, usually stolen goods, heroin or counterfeit money. He was one of the Satan's Choice bikers with the most closest ties to the Mafia. Sanguigni was the prime suspect in several murders, but the police never had enough evidence to charge him. Sanguigni did not have a job or any known source of legitimate income, but owned a house in Toronto in a lower-middle-class neighborhood, which was considered suspicious by the police who believed he purchased his house with the profits from his work as a hitman. Sanguigni was one of four Satan's Choice bikers in the 1970s who were known to work as subcontractors for the Mafia.

== Port Hope 8 Case ==
On the night of 18 October 1978, Sanguigni was one of a group of Satan's Choice bikers who went to the Queen's Hotel in Port Hope following a call for help from Richard Sauvé. The American journalist Mick Lowe wrote that Sanguigni "was by far and away the scariest" of the group who went to the Queen's Hotel that night. Upon arriving at the Queen's Hotel, Sanguigni recognized one of the Outlaws present, Fred Jones, as a former member of Satan's Choice. Accusing him of betraying Satan's Choice, Sanguigni proceeded to berate and insult Jones in the pinball room of the Queen's Hotel while Jones became increasing hysterical with fear. When William "Heavy" Matiyek of the Golden Hawk Riders was shot and killed, Sanguigni fled the Queen's Hotel via the John Street exit.

During the investigation, one of the witnesses to the murder, the waitress Cathy Cotgrave, on 21 October 1978 picked Sanguigni's photograph out of a police array of various photographs of Satan's Choice bikers. On 5 December 1978, a warrant was issued for Sanguigni's arrest. Sanguigni was the only one of the Port Hope 8 to evade arrest for a significant period of time, being arrested in January 1979. Sanguigni was arrested on 12 January 1979 in Rexdale. At the preliminary hearing for the Port Hope 8 held at the town hall of Port Hope in February 1979, Campbell attended the hearing, which led to objections from Sanguigni who felt that Campbell's presence was inappropriate. Sanguigni was denied bail and held at the Whitby jail while awaiting trial. During his trial for Matiyek's murder, Sangigni was defended by Bernard Cugelman, a Toronto lawyer often defended bikers.

The trial for the Port Hope 8 began in London, Ontario on 4 September 1979. During the trial, Cotgrave was the only witness who named Sanguigni as being present at the time of Matiyek's murder as she testified that Sanguingi was with Jones in the pinball room and that Jones "was waving his arms around, like he was in hysterics or something". During his cross-examination of Cotgrave, Cugelman made much of various differences between Cotgrave's testimony at the preliminary hearing vs her testimony at the trial. Cotgrave held well under the hostile questioning, and insisted that she saw Sanguigni in the pinball room. In his final submission to the jury, Cugelman noted that only Cotgrave had identified Sanguigni as present at the time of the murder, and he noted that she had made mistakes in her testimony about the other witnesses, most notably Gary Comeau whom she was "pretty sure" was the man who had killed Matiyek. The Crown Attorney at the trial, Chris Meinhardt, noted that Cotgrave had named Sanguigni as being present, which led him to argue that Sanguigni had been part of a conspiracy to murder Matiyek, which made him just as guilty of first degree murder as whoever had killed Matiyek. Meinhardt noted in English common law (the legal system used in Canada) that there was the concept of constructive first degree murder, which applied to those actions caused a murder to take part even if they did not kill someone themselves. Meinhardt argued that one of the Port Hope 8 who was probably Comeau had killed Matiyek and he argued that the others present were there to seal the exits to prevent Matiyek from escaping, which made them all guilty of first degree murder in his view. On 24 November 1979, the trial ended with Sanguigni being acquitted on all counts. Along with Gordon van Haarlem, Sanguigni was the only one of the Port Hope 8 to be acquitted.

== Death ==
Sanguigni was found dead along with his common law wife Katalin Dobrovolszky in his west Toronto home on 8 October 1984. Both had died of heroin overdoses. A Toronto police spokesman stated: "It could be murder-suicide, a double suicide, a drug overdose-we don't' know at this point". It was never determined if Sangiugni's death was murder or not, but his death is regarded as suspicious. Kirby described Sanguigni's death as a murder as he accused someone of giving Sangigni and Kobrovolszky intentional overdoses of heroin. Campbell described Sanguigni as a reckless heroin addict who took routinely took larger doses of heroin than was safe, and stated that Sanguigni's death was a case of death by misadventure.

On 5 December 1991, Joe Bastos, one of the lawyers for one of the "Port Hope Eight", Merv Blaker told a private detective who summarized his statement as: "The group jerked around for a long time before producing the gunman. Finally Campbell was brought forward, he was a real space cadet, he was always stoned. Thinks Sanguigni might have been the gunman".

== Books ==
- Edwards, Peter (2013). Unrepentant The Strange and (Sometimes) Terrible Life of Lorne Campbell, Satan's Choice and Hells Angels Biker. Toronto: Vintage Canada. ISBN 9780307362575.
- Edwards, Peter (2017), Hard Road: Bernie Guindon and the Reign of the Satan's Choice Motorcycle Club, HarperCollins, ISBN 978-1443427258
- Kirby, Cecil; Renner, Thomas (1986). Mafia Enforcer. Toronto: Villard Books. ISBN 9780394544595.
- Lowe, Mick (2013). A Conspiracy of Brothers: A True Story of Bikers, Murder and the Law. Toronto: Vintage Canada. ISBN 978-0345813169.
