= Larry Hurren =

Canadian outlaw biker (1955–1996)

Lawrence James Hurren (1 May 1955 – 30 July 1996) was a Canadian outlaw biker and one of the Port Hope 8.

== Satan's Choice ==
An young man from Oshawa who worked at various times as an automobile worker or a cabbie, Hurren was a close friend of Lorne Edgar Campbell with he had boarded with as a teenager. Campbell had sponsored Hurren into the Satan's Choice Motorcycle Club. Hurren fought as an amateur boxer with Campbell as his manager. Despite their friendship, Campbell once nearly shot Hurren he attempted to break into the Oshawa clubhouse after he lost his key. In the 1970s, Hurren frequently visited Florida to make contact with the Outlaws and helped to forge an alliance with the Outlaws. In June 1978, Hurren along with his fellow Satan's Choice bikers Gary Comeau, Jeff McLeod, and Gordon van Haarlem were charged with a brawl at the Alderville Indian Reserve when they gate-clashed a party at the reserve, which led to a number of fights.

== The Murder of Matiyek ==
On the night of 18 October 1978, Richard Sauvé of Satan's Choice Peterborough chapter called Gary Comeau of the Toronto chapter to ask for volunteers to back him for a possible bar fight at the Queen's Hotel in Port Hope against William "Heavy" Matiyek of the rival Golden Hawk Riders. Hurren was of those who answered the call and drove out from Toronto to Port Hope with Campbell. Along the way, Hurren and Campbell stopped to pick up a revolver. Campbell and Hurren were the first Satan's Choice bikers to arrive at the Queen's Hotel. While Campbell sat down at a table, Hurren went up to the bar to order two pints of beer. While at the bar, Hurren chatted with Merv Blaker and identified himself as Satan's Choice to the bartender. Hurren's stay at the Queen's Hotel was cut short when Campbell shot and killed Matieyk. After the shooting, Hurren fled the Queen's Hotel.

On 20 October 1978, Cathy Cotgrave, a waitress at the Queen's Hotel who witnessed the murder, picked Hurren's photo out of a photo array provided to her by the police and named him as one of the bikers present. Another witness, Susan Foote, likewise picked Hurren's photo out of the photo array. During another session, Cotgrave along with the head waitress, Gayle Thompson, both selected Hurren's photograph during a viewing of the photo array. By late October 1978, Hurren was viewed by the police as a suspect.

== Arrest ==
On 5 December 1978, a warrant was issued for Hurren's arrest. On 6 December 1978, Hurren was arrested at Satan's Choice Toronto clubhouse along with Gary Comeau and Jeff McLeod on charges of conspiracy to commit murder. Hurren was held in the county jail in Cobourg. On 18 December 1978 at a bail hearing at Osgoode Hall, Hurren was granted bail after his parents posted $10, 000 in surety. On 15 January 1979, the Crown Attorney in charge of prosecuting the Port Hope 8, Chris Meinhardt, increased the charges to first degree murder. On 2 February 1979, Hurren was convicted of unlawful assembly in connection with the incident at the Alderville reserve and was sentenced to two years of probation. Hurren chose as his lawyer, David Newman, a very inexperienced young lawyer just fresh out of law school. Newman supported the decision by Bruce Affleck, McLeod's lawyer who also served as the senior defense counsel, that none of the accused should testify in their defense.

== Trial ==
The trial of the "Port Hope 8" began on 4 September 1979 in London, Ontario. Newman attempted to have a mistrial declared on 11 September 1979 when of the Crown's witnesses, Constable Donald Denis, used the phrase outlaw motorcycle gang, to describe Satan's Choice. The waitress Cathy Cotgrave testified that she had seen Hurren with David Hoffman and that "they seemed to be watching the phone-because they were standing by the phone and you can see the phone from where they were standing=like the receiver". During his testimony, Campbell maintained that he had drinking with Hurren at the Toronto clubhouse and received a call that was trouble at the Queen's Hotel. One of the Crown's witnesses, Susan Foote, named Hurren as one of the Satan's Choice bikers present when Matiyek was killed, and pointed out him in the courtroom. Under cross-examination from Newman, Foote testified that she only saw Hurren drinking beer and he had been some distance away from Matiyek when he was killed. During a cross-examination of another of the Crown's witnesses, William Goodwin, Newman asked him if he remembered meeting him in a London coffee shop. Upon receiving an affirmative answer, Newman accused Goodwin of saying to a police officer "I thing we've got all eight of these guys for twenty-five years". What followed was a lengthy shouting match in the courtroom as Goodwin denied making the remark that Newman claimed to have heard say.

In his final submission to the jury, Newman adopted the highly unusual strategy of linking the first letter of the surnames of the jurors to a theme. Newman told juror number two, Sandra Johnson, that she remember that the letter J represented the testimony of Julie Joncas. Newman stated juror number three, Laura Lippold that L stood for Logic, which she should apply when assessing the rival views of the prosecution and defense. Likewise, Newman advised juror number four, Edgar Horace Gudgeon, that G stood for Gunman, which the Crown had been unable to establish during the trial.

Newman noted that Hurren had admitted in his statements to the police that he had been at the Queen's Hotel when Matiyek was killed, but "it makes no sense that Larry Hurren would go to a hotel where he knew he would be recognized to commit a murder". Newman further noted that there was no evidence that Hurren was involved in the feud between Satan's Choice and the Golden Hawk Riders along with the fact "there is no evidence of any animosity between Larry Hurren and Mr. Matiyek". Newman argued on the evidence of the Crown's own witnesses all Hurren had done was order some pints of beer at the Queen's Hotel and no evidence had been presented that his client had killed Matiyek. Newman stated that Hurren had gone to the Queen's Hotel for a possible bar fight "but some fool pulled out a gun and killed Matiyek on a ridiculous impulse". Newman concluded that there was no evidence linking Hurren to the killer, whoever he may had been.

Affleck thought that Newman's use of the initials of the jurors during his address was a major blunder that did much to turn the jury against the Port Hope Eight. Affleck vowed never to work again with inexperienced lawyers as he felt that Newman's use of the names of the jurors in his address was alienating. Justice Counter Osborne gave Newman a pointed rebuke for his final submission on 12 November 1979 as he told him: "...the mechanics of their presentation was wrong and that creates a problem. the difficulty I find, Mr. Newman, is that your approach, while having significant theatrical merit, is wrong in law, and the jury is going to have to be told that...they are not here to give an individual, isolated decision, but they all must consider all of the evidence, and the approach suggested by Mr. Newman was just the opposite of that, where the jury was singled out and invited to each consider a given point". In his final submission to the jury, Meinhardt noted that under English common law (the legal system used in Canada) that if a person who assists or orders a murder is just as guilty of the murder as the person who committed the murder. Meinhardt noted that four witnesses had identified Hurren as being present when Matiyek was killed. On 24 November 1979, Hurren was found guilty of second degree murder.

A private detective, M.J. O'Brien, wrote about the case: "The investigation was poorly done. Every copper we spoke to asked us who killed Matiyek. After the conviction in November of 1979, police officers still did not know who shot Matiyek and a certain police officer, O.P.P. Corporal Terry Hall asked accused Larry Hurren what in fact had really happened at The Queen's Hotel on October 18, 1978. If Hurren would tell, Hall promised a reduced sentence. Hall was an experienced O.P.P. investigator. He must have realized that the thing was botched from the start, partly his doing."

== Imprisonment ==
Hurren was held at Millhaven Institution maximum security prison. During his time at Millhaven, Hurren played for Satan's Choice prison hockey team, the Millhaven Bulldogs, alongside Bernie Guindon, Gary Comeau, Richard Sauvé and Jeff McLeod. Hurren who barely knew how to skate was a notably poor hockey player. The Satan's Choice prisoners at Millhaven formed a tight clique and Hurren was clearly upset when Blaker was transferred to Joyceville institution in August 1982. In June 1983, Hurren along with McLeod were transferred to Collins Bay medium security prison. In 1989, he was on parole. In the 1990s, Hurren was involved with the Association In Defense of the Wrongly Convicted (AIDWYC) and campaigned for freedom for the remaining Port Hope 8 prisoners still behind bars. Hurren was killed in an automobile accident in July 1996. Found on his motorcycle was the phrase written on the gas tank "Justice in Ontario", a reference to the protest song about the Port Hope 8 case.

== Books ==
- Edwards, Peter (2013). Unrepentant The Strange and (Sometimes) Terrible Life of Lorne Campbell, Satan's Choice and Hells Angels Biker. Toronto: Vintage Canada. ISBN 9780307362575.
- Edwards, Peter (2017). Hard Road: Bernie Guindon and the Reign of the Satan's Choice Motorcycle Club. Toronto: Random House. ISBN 978-0345816108.
- Lowe, Mick (2013). A Conspiracy of Brothers: A True Story of Bikers, Murder and the Law. Toronto: Vintage Canada. ISBN 978-0345813169.
