= Merv Blaker =

Canadian outlaw biker

Murray Lloyd "Merv" Blaker (born 1945) is a Canadian outlaw biker, convicted in the Port Hope 8 case, turned social activist.

== Satan's Choice ==
Blaker was born into an Ojibwe family in Baltimore. In 1942 Blaker's parents had renounced their status as "status Indians" under the Indian Act of 1876 as they wished to live off the Alderville Reservation in order to assist with the war effort by working in a factory manufacturing munitions. In 1942, the only way that it was legally possible for First Nations people to live off reservations was to declare themselves to be "non-status Indians", which required Blaker's father, Gordon Blaker, to sign a declaration that stated he no longer identified as Ojibwe and now viewed himself as white, which applied also to his wife, children and future children. Blaker's state as a "non-status Indian" left him feeling very like an outsider growing up as his appearance was Ojibwe while he was expected to identify as white.

Blaker dropped of school in grade 8 and took up riding motorcycles as a teenager. A painfully shy man, his quiet nature was often misunderstood as stupidity. In 1967, he joined Satan's Choice Motorcycle Club. Joining Satan's Choice gave Blaker a sense of belonging as Satan's Choice was highly unusual among outlaw biker clubs in allowing non-white men to join their "brotherhood". At the same time, Satan's Choice did not impose the condition that he renounce his Ojibwe heritage. Blaker was famed as one of the best motorcycle riders in Satan's Choice along with being one of the best mechanics who was able to fix almost any broken motorcycles. At the time, Blaker joined Satan's Choice, the group was more of a genuine motorcycle club instead of being a criminal organization that masqueraded as a motorcycle club. Blaker was noted for his easy-going nature and an unwillingness to engage in violence, being more interested in riding motorcycles and being part of a "brotherhood" where his Ojibwe ethnicity was not an issue. Blaker was described as being "a non-violent outlaw biker". Peter Edwards, the crime correspondent of the Toronto Star wrote about Blaker's riding: "At times, he truly seemed at one with his motorcycle commanding it to do high-speed wheelies, veering to the left and right, or to inch forward at what seemed like an impossibly slow speed". Blaker was opposed to the alliance that Satan's Choice made with the Outlaws in 1975, which he predicated would lead to a disaster.

The fact that Blaker held a legitimate job as a repair man at the marine outlet instead of having no apparent source of legitimate income as was the case with many other Satan's Choice members has been used by the American journalist Mick Lowe to argue that Blaker was not engaged in organized crime. Blaker had one conviction for car theft along with several convictions for the possession of marijuana and for unpaid speeding tickets. Prior to the Port Hope 8 case, Blaker had done 30 days in prison for accumulated unpaid parking and speeding tickets. One Satan's Choice member, Lorne Edgar Campbell, recalled that the president of the Peterbourgh chapter, William Lavoie, once tried to teach a clearly uninterested Blaker how to fire a handgun and ended up shooting himself in the foot when he grew enraged at Blaker's inability to handle a gun properly.

== The Matiyek murder ==
On the night of 18 October 1978, Blaker was called by Richard Sauvé to come with him for a possible confrontation with William "Heavy" Matiyek, the sergeant-at-arms of the rival Golden Hawk Riders, at the barroom of the Queen's Hotel. Blaker agreed to the request. Sauvé arrived at the Queen's Hotel together with Blaker. There was a feeling of tension in the air as everyone expected a confrontation to occur and several patrons left the Queen's Hotel. A waitress, Cathy Cotgrave, told Blaker and Sauvé that Satan's Choice members were banned from the Queen's Hotel and that they would not be served. Ignoring her, Blaker went up to the bar and ordered a drink from the bartender, Rick Galbraith, whom he knew well. When Matiyek was shot, Blaker abandoned his drink and fled via the John Street entrance to his parked car. Blaker drove first to Toronto, where he stayed at the Toronto clubhouse of Satan's Choice, and then to Kitchener, where he arrived at about 2 am at the house of David Hoffman, the treasurer of the Kitchener chapter, to treat Gary Comeau for his bullet wound.

== Arrest ==
On 5 December 1978, a warrant was issued for Blaker's arrest on charges of conspiracy to commit murder. Blaker was arrested at his Port Hope house on 7 December 1978 by Constable Colin Cousens and Sergeant Sam McReelis on charges of conspiracy to commit murder. Blaker heard the knocking on his door while lying in bed, looked out the window to see the policemen standing out front, and then back went to sleep. Blaker was arrested in bed and told his mother-in-law to tell his wife Karen that he would make bail and be home for Christmas. On 27 December 1978, a bail hearing was held for the three of the Port Hope 8 at Osgoode Hall in Toronto, where Blaker was represented by the lawyer Howard Kerbel. Blaker's wife, Karen Blaker, appeared at the hearing where she offered to post surety for her husband and promised the court that she would pressure her husband to resign from Satan's Choice if the judge was would grant her husband bail. Kerbel questioned McReelis on the stand, and asked him when Blaker became a suspect in the murder, and was informed almost soon as Matiyek was killed. Kerbel asked McReelis that if he regarded Blaker as a flight risk during the interval between Matiyek's murder on 18 October and Blaker's arrest on 7 December, and received the response that he did not. Justice Krever denied Blaker bail and he was sent to the Northumberland county jail in Cobourg. Blaker described the Cobourg county jail as a cold and uncomfortable place where he was not allowed to watch television until noon. Blaker hired as his lawyer, Terry O'Hara, an young lawyer from Kingston who had just graduated from Queen's University Law School who was to represent him in the courts for the next ten years. O'Hara, a good-natured, ribald corpulent figure with a gargantuan appetite for food, drink and sex became Blaker's best friend. On 15 January 1979, the Crown Attorney in charge of prosecuting the Port Hope Eight, Chris Meinhardt, increased the charges by indicting them all for first degree murder.

On 19 February 1979, Blaker along with the rest of the Port Hope Eight were taken to the Port Hope courthouse for the preliminary hearing (the Canadian equivalent to a grand jury). At the preliminary hearing, Cotgrave testified that on the night of the murder, a group of about 20 men entered the Queen's Hotel and she recognized Blaker and Sauvé as amongst the group. During his cross-examination of Cotgrave, O'Hare asked her if she knew Blaker and received a positive answer as she testified that he had frequently drank in the Queen's Hotel's bar-room in the past. O'Hara then asked Cotgrave if she saw Blaker with Matiyek on the night of the murder and received a negative reply. Likewise, she testified that she was aware of no special animosity between Matiyek and Blaker, though she noted that Matiyek feared all members of Satan's Choice. O'Hara who a friendly and affable courtroom style was able to have Cotgrave admit that before she went to work at the Queen's Hotel on 18 October 1978 she had been smoking marijuana and drank some shots of Southern Comfort, through she insisted that did not affect her memory of the murder. On 23 February 1979, Blaker was asked if he wanted to say anything in his defense and he declined. The next witness called to the stand, a waitress at the Queen's Hotel, Julie Joncas, testified that she often taken rides in Matiyek's car and that Matiyek made a point of driving by the houses of Blaker and Sauvé to write down the license plates of any cars parked in front in case the automobiles belonged to visiting Satan's Choice members from other chapters. On 19 March 1979, Justice Scullion ruled that the Crown had presented enough evidence on the charges of first-degree murder for the case to go to trial. After the ruling, Blaker was moved to the jail in Lindsay, where he stayed until the trial began.

Blaker came to be very close to his lawyer O'Hara who visited his family to offer advice and moral support. O'Hara felt that most of his clients were guilty of the acts that they were accused of, but he believed Blaker to be an innocent man as he regarded Blaker as a painfully shy, but an honest man who unlike most of his clients did not lie to him or others. Blaker told O'Hara that the Crown's theory that Gary Comeau killed Matiyek with the rest of the Port Hope Eight serving to block the exits as a part of a conspiracy was a nonsensical theory. One of the Port Hope Eight, Armand Sanguigni, worked as a hitman for the Mafia and was the prime suspect in at least a dozen murders. By contrast, "Nutty" Comeau had a goofy reputation as a silly and irresponsible man. O'Hara concluded if there had been a conspiracy to kill Matiyek, the task would have been assigned to the coldly efficient professional contract killer Sangiugni, instead of the goofy and silly Comeau. Furthermore, O'Hara reasoned on the basis of his conversations with Blaker that even if Comeau had been assigned the task, Sangiugni would still not had been present at the Queen's Hotel as he would have known that Comeau would be arrested sooner or later on the account of his immaturity and himself as well. As such, O'Hara reached the conclusion there was no conspiracy to kill Matiyek and he was defending an innocent man whose only crime was being at the Queen's Hotel at the time of the murder.

On 5 July 1979, O'Hara met with the other lawyers for the Port Hope Eight at the North Toronto home of Howard Kerbel (the lawyer for Comeau) to discuss a common defense strategy. O'Hara believed that as an Ojibwa man the all-white jury would be predisposed to convict Blaker because of his race, and very much wanted him to testify in his defense. O'Hara believed that if Blaker were to testify, his sincerity, honesty and good nature would show his humanity to the jury and dispel their prejudices against him for being an Ojibwa. However, the other defense lawyers all objected to O'Hara's plans to have Blaker testify and felt it best for him to remain silent. Led by Bruce Affleck, the lawyer for Jeff McLeod, it was argued that the accused would follow the outlaw biker code on the stand and would refuse to incriminate another biker in a crime by not answering any questions about who killed Matiyek. The former Crown Attorney Affleck who worked with Meinhardt in the past predicated that Meinhardt during his cross-examination of Blaker would "destroy" him as a witness by asking him point-blank who had killed Matiyek and not receive any answer. Affleck argued that the jury would not understand the accused would follow the outlaw biker code and would see the refusal to name the killer as evidence of guilt. Finally, the other defense lawyers argued that if Blaker testified in his defense, it would make their clients look guilty when they chose to remain silent. O'Hara left the meeting deeply unhappy and remained convinced that Blaker should testify at the trial as he knew that juries tend to be very suspicious of defendants who do not testify in their defense.

== Trial ==
The trial of the "Port Hope 8" began on 4 September 1979 in London, Ontario. The jury was an all white jury made of seven men and five women, all of whom were middle-aged and middle-class. The defense lawyers would have preferred that the trial be held in Toronto, where a more racially diverse jury might had been recruited, but the Crown insisted on London. O'Hara expressed some concern about the composition of the jury whom he noted disapproved of his First Nations client with his black hair and dark skin, and felt that Meinhardt had the advantage.

During the trial, O'Hara, argued that the Crown's thesis of a premediated murder was illogical as Blaker was very well known to the staff and patrons of the Queen's Hotel who would name him as a suspect in the event of a murder. A witness for the Crown, David Gillespie, testified that Gary Comeau had told Blaker and Sauvé just minutes before Matiyek was killed: "Are we going to it to this fat fucker now or what?" Gillespie stated that he saw the murderous impulses on the faces of both Blaker and Sauvé who told Comeau to kill Matiyek now. Gillespie's testimony was the keystone to the Crown's theory of first degree murder as it was the only evidence that the Crown presented during the trial had that the Port Hope 8 had gone to the Queen's Hotel with the intention of killing Matiyek. Meinhardt used Gillespie's testimony to suggest that Blaker and Sauvé were the ones who ordered Comeau to kill Matiyek. Gillespie's testimony was the only evidence that Meinhardt presented that linked Blaker directly to the murder as it made clear during the trial that Blaker was present when Matieyk was killed, but there was no other evidence that linked him to the murder. Under cross-examination from Kerbel, Gillespie admitted that a number of details differed in his three statements to the police given on 19 October 1978, 28 November 1978, and 29 December 1978, and that his present testimony differed quite "substantially" from all of his statements. In his first statement, Gillespie stated that Blaker and Sauvé were already at the Queen's Hotel after he arrived and in his third statement he arrived at the Queen's Hotel before Blaker and Sauvé. Gillespie also admitted that he had been drunk on the night of 18 October 1978 and could not remember if he saw Sauvé at Matiyek's table or not. The most crucial difference between Gillespie's first statement given hours after the murder vs. his testimony in 1979 was that the remark about the "fat fucker" Matiyek concerned who was to speak to him first, not who was to kill him.

One witness, Randy Koehler, the bouncer at the Queen's Hotel, testified for the Crown they had a been a brawl at the Queen's Hotel in December 1977 where Blaker along with Richard Sauvé, Gordon van Haarlem, David Hoffman, Gary Comeau, Larry Hurren, Brian Babcock and Tommny "the Retard" Horner had beaten up Matiyek as evidence that the accused hated Matiyek so much that they wanted him dead. Under cross-examination from O'Hara, Koehler conceded that Matiyek had started the fight by punching "Retard" Horner in the face, and the other six Satan's Choice bikers had merely came to the aid of Horner. Furthermore, Koehler also changed his testimony under cross-examination and stated that neither Blaker and Sauvé were present at the fight in December 1977.

During the trial, O'Hara spent hours with Blaker at the Middlesex County Detention Center reviewing the case and looking any flaws in the Crown's thesis. O'Hara had a private detective, Joe Bastos, research the Port Hope Eight case and interview witnesses. Bastos would drive out to Port Hope to interview the witnesses and always discovered that they had a mysterious alteration in their willingness to remember or testify for the defense. The potential witnesses all told Bastos that they were too frightened to testify for Blaker. Both O'Hara and Bastos believed that the police had illegally bugged their offices and phones and were intimidating the witnesses. In a 1987 interview, Bastos told Lowe: "The witnesses had been warned off by the cops".

As the case was coming to a close, O'Hara begged Blaker to take the stand and testify in his defense even it meant violating the outlaw biker code by naming the killer. As Blaker refused, O'Hara asked him to sign a statement he typed up that read: "I, Murray Lloyd Blaker, hereby instruct my counsel, Terrence C. O'Hara, that I do not wish to give evidence at my trial. I understand that Mr. O'Hara has advised me that it would be in my best interest to give evidence and that if I do not give evidence I will likely be convicted on the charge of First Degree Murder for which I am now being tried. This Direction has been read to me and I understand its contents. Dated at London this 6th day of November 1979". Blaker signed the statement and told O'Hara that following the outlaw biker code was so important to him that he was willing to go to prison rather than violate it. When Justice Counter Osborne who oversaw the trial asked O'Hara what evidence he planned to give in the defense of Blaker, O'Hara responded: "My Lord, I don't intend to call any evidence".

In his final submission to the jury, O'Hara argued to the jury that the Crown had failed to present any proof that Blaker had been involved in a conspiracy to kill Matiyek with the Crown's only evidence being that Blaker was present when Matiyek was killed. O'Hara noted that Matiyek was a Golden Hawk Rider while Blaker was Satan's Choice, but there was no evidence that Blaker had any great hatred of Matiyek. O'Hara asked the jury to think about "the way the world works" and argued that it was illogical to be involved in a murder at the Queen's Hotel where he was known by name by the patrons and staff. O'Hara made much that Campbell had confessed on the stand that he killed Matiyek, not Comeau, which he used as evidence that the Crown had botched the case by charging the wrong man. O'Hara noted that Campbell had convicted of perjury, but argued that Satan's Choice would not had chosen a member with a perjury conviction to confess to the murder, and would have selected someone else. For this reason, O'Hara argued that Campbell was telling the truth that he had shot Matiyek in self-defense after Matiyek went for one of his guns. In his final submission to the jury, Meinhardt noted that under English common law (the legal system used in Canada) that if a person who assists or orders a murder is just as guilty of the murder as the person who committed the murder. Meinhardt noted that six witnesses had identified Blaker as being one of the Satan's Choice bikers present when Matiyek was killed. Meinhardt further noted that Cotgrave had told Sauvé and Blaker that they would not be served, and yet the duo had stayed at the Queen's Hotel, which he used to argue that both Sauvé and Blaker were there for murder. Finally, Meinhardt used that the testimony of Gillispie who stated that Comeau had asked Blaker and Sauvé: "Are we going to do it to this fat fucker now or what?" Meinhardt argued that the "fat fucker" statement was "a clarion call to action".

In his instructions to the jury, Justice Counter Osborne explained the differences in English common law between first degree murder and second degree murder. In his instructions, Osborne explained first degree murder are "cold" murders where someone intentionally takes the life of another person in a result of a "planned and deliberate" decision while second degree murders are "hot" murders where someone intentionally takes the life of another in a spontaneous decision. Osborne noted that Meinhardt had failed to present "direct evidence of planning and deliberation", but there was a circumstantial case that Matiyek's murder was a case of first degree murder. However, Osborne described Gillespie as a poor witness who changed his story so many times about he had alleged to have heard and seen that Osborne felt it would be unwise to convict the accused of first degree murder on the basis of Gillespie's testimony. Justice Osborne stated there was a case to be made that Matiyek's killing was a case of manslaughter as Matiyek was armed and talking about shooting the Satan's Choice bikers in the Queen's Hotel when he was killed, quite possibly in self-defense. However, Osborne instructed the jury those who aid and abet manslaughter can be found guilty of second degree murder as he instructed the jury that if can be "proved beyond a reasonable doubt that each accused person formed an intention in common to assault Matiyek and that it has been proved beyond a reasonable doubt that in carrying out that common assault each accused knew or ought to have known that death was the probably consequence, a proper verdict would be guilty of second-degree murder, not guilty of first degree murder". On 24 November 1979, the jury announced its verdicts and found Blaker guilty of second degree murder. The judge sentenced Blaker to 10 years in prison on the account of the fact that this was Blaker's first serious criminal conviction.

== Imprisonment ==
Of the Port Hope 8, Blaker was the only one retained his defense counsel for his appeals. He felt that he should have followed O'Hara's advice to testify at the trial. Blaker was held at Millhaven Institution, where the stress of imprisonment caused him to suffer from chest pains. In August 1982, Blaker was moved to the minimum security Joyceville prison. Blaker, a grade 8 dropout, earned his high school diploma during his time at Joyceville. During his time in prison, the well liked Blaker collected evidence that a number of the witnesses for the Crown at the 1979 trial had committed perjury. Blaker was considered to be a "model" prisoner, but the Crown fought against his efforts to granted parole as the Crown maintained that was a violent man. At a parole hearing on 21 November 1985, the members of the parole board were more interested in the Port Hope 8 case than in Blaker's life behind bars as the members of the parole board demanded to know who killed Matiyek. Blaker followed the outlaw biker code and refused to name the killer of Matiyek, which led to his parole application being refused.

In the spring of 1986, Blaker was sent to the Frontenac Work Camp, which he described in a letter as "just like a slave camp". In 1986, a petition was signed in Port Hope with more 200 people signing a statement that Blaker was an easy-going, peaceful man and should be granted parole. In 1988, Blaker successfully applied to have his Indian status restored, which meant he was not longer legally regarded as white and was now legally an Ojibwa. In an interview with the American journalist Mick Lowe the same year, Blaker stated that he intended to leave Satan's Choice as he was more interested in spending time with his wife and daughter and developing his spiritual side. After his release on parole in 1989, Blaker settled down on a farm beside Rice Lake where he raises cattle and works as an amateur mechanic. In 2011, his knee was replaced owing to injuries he endured as a prisoner. In 2013, Blaker was busy with raising his ten-year-old son Joseph whom he noted was being brought up as an Ojibwa. Blaker is now works as a social activist.

== Books ==
- Edwards, Peter (2013). Unrepentant The Strange and (Sometimes) Terrible Life of Lorne Campbell, Satan's Choice and Hells Angels Biker. Toronto: Vintage Canada. ISBN 9780307362575.
- Lowe, Mick (2013). A Conspiracy of Brothers: A True Story of Bikers, Murder and the Law. Toronto: Vintage Canada. ISBN 978-0345813169.
