= Gordon van Haarlem =

Canadian outlaw biker

Gordon John van Haarlem (born 26 July 1956) is a Canadian outlaw biker who was one of the "Port Hope 8" tried in one of the most controversial trials in Canadian history.

== Satan's Choice ==
Born in Peterborough into a working class Dutch-Canadian family, van Haarlem joined Satan's Choice Motorcycle Club as a teenager. He worked as a welder at construction sits. By age of 23, van Haarlem had a lengthy criminal record with convictions for assault, mischief, possession of an unregistered gun, theft, possession of narcotic, and possession of narcotics with the intention of trafficking. HIs nickname of "Dog Map" was originally "Dog Face", a moniker given in irony as "Dog Face" suggested that he was ugly, but in fact van Haarlem was considered to be handsome. The nickname became "Dog Map" as given to him by Gary Comeau in reference to his tendency to take winding routes in riding his motorcycle across the countryside. Van Haarlem was known as a fighter within Satan's Choice, and had his nose broken a number of times. He often stayed in Port Hope where he served as a babysitter for another Satan's Choice biker, Richard Sauvé when Sauvé and his wife went to concerts in Toronto.

== The Port Hope 8 case ==
On 18 October 1978, Lorne Campbell shot and killed William "Heavy" Matiyek at the Queen's Hotel in Port Hope shortly before 11 pm. On the same night, Sergeant Samuel McReelis of the Port Hope police arrived at the Queen's Hotel as the lead investigator. On 5 December 1978, van Haarlem was arrested and charged with conspiracy to commit murder in connection with the death of Matiyek. The charges promoted astonishment from the other bikers present at the Queen's Hotel as van Haarlem was not at the Queen's Hotel on the night of the murder. The journalist Paul Dalby wrote it was odd that van Haarlem was charged as he had an "airtight alibi". One of the "Port Hope 8", Jeff McLeod was to claim to a private detective in an interview on 6 February 1992 that it was common knowledge that van Haarlem "was screwing McReelis's wife" and that was the reason why van Haarlem was charged with Matiyek's murder. Donald Avison, the federal civil servant who reexamined the Port Hope 8 case in 1990 at the request of the federal justice minister, Kim Campbell, stated in an interview on 7 February 1992: "There's some suggestion that van Haarlem had spent some time with McReelis' wife".

For his defense, van Haarlem hired Donald Ebbs as his counsel. On 23 February 1979 at the preliminary hearing, Ebbs made an alibi defense as he called two witnesses who both stated that van Haarlem was drinking at the King George Hotel in Peterborough on the night of 18 October 1978 and was not in Port Hope as the Crown had claimed. One bouncer at the King George Hotel testified that van Haarlem had been wearing his club colors on the night of 18 October, leading to him to ask van Haarlem to put away his gang colors as the King George Hotel did not permit the wearing of gang colors. On 19 March 1979, Justice Scullion ruled that the Crown had presented enough evidence to bring charges of first degree murder against van Haarlem. While awaiting his trial, van Haarlem was denied bail and held at the Peterborough jail. On 26 July 1979, his girlfriend Patricia gave birth to his daughter Amber. His request to visit his girlfriend to see his child was denied by the Crown. In August 1979, van Haarlem played a key role in scuttling a plea bargain from the Crown under which Campbell would plea guilty to second degree murder in exchange for the Port Hope 8 would plea guilty to being accessories after the fact and would serve four years in prison. Van Haarlem insisted that he should not have to do any prison time as he was not at the Queen's Hotel on the night of the murder, leading him to reject the plea bargain.

The trial for the Port Hope 8 began in London, Ontario on 4 September 1979. Along with David George Hoffman, van Haarlem was the only one of the Port Hope 8 who testified in his own defense. At the trial, only one of the Crown's witnesses, Helen Ann Mitchell, identified van Haarlem as present at the Queen's Hotel at the time of the Matiyek murder. She testified that she saw van Haarlem, Gary Comeau, Richard Sauvé, Larry Hurren and David George Hoffman all present at the Queen's Hotel engaged in a discussion just before the murder. Another of the Crown's witnesses, Susan Jean Foote, who knew Mitchell, was to testify that she could not remember seeing Mitchell at the Queen's Hotel on the night of the murder. Mitchell made a poor impression on the jury due to her rambling, often incoherent testimony. Many of her statements were vague as she failed to name the bartender at the Queen's Hotel on the night of 18 October as she stated she could not remember his name or face. The fact that Mitchell had only come forward to the police on Christmas Day 1978-two months after the murder-did not help her credibility along with the fact that she could not remember on the stand when she came forward to the police as she stated she "might" had done so a week after the murder, but was not certain on that point. Ebbs in his cross-examination of Mitchell forced her to concede that her memory was unreliable as she testified that she saw van Haarlem wear the patch of a "striker" in Satan's Choice in September 1978 when he was already a "full patch" member. Mitchell admitted that she often confused van Haarlem with Thomas "Tommy the Retard" Horner, but stated that it did not matter as both van Haarlem and Horner were Satan's Choice bikers.

In his defense, van Haarlem took the stand to testify he had been in Port Hope on 17 October 1978 serving as a babysitter for Sauvé and had returned to Peterborough the next day. He testified that on the night of the murder he had been drinking at the King George Hotel from 8:30 pm to 1:30 am. A number of witnesses testified that they had seen van Haarlem at the King George Hotel at the time that he claimed to have been there. It was a hour's drive from Peterborough to Port Hope, it was not possible for van Haarlem to disappear from the King George Hotel for two hours without paying his tab at the bar. The Crown Attorney prosecuting the case, Chris Meinhardt, was unable to present any evidence beyond the testimony of Mitchell that van Haarlem was at the Queen's Hotel on 18 October 1978 and his thesis for the guilt of van Haarlem consisted of bringing up his extensive criminal record, which filled an entire page of the trial transcript. In his final submission to the jury, Ebbs noted that numerous witnesses confirmed van Haarlem's alibi while the Crown's only evidence for his guilt was the testimony of Mitchell which was confused on a number of points. In an obvious reference to Hoffman whose alibi was supported only by other members of Satan's Choice, Ebbs noted that the alibi witnesses for van Haarlem were not members of Satan's Choice and had no connection to Satan's Choice. Ebb's tactics caused consternation among the other accused and the other defense lawyers. Meinhardt in his final submission to the jury accused the defendants of all part of a conspiracy to kill Matiyek and stated the accused were all equally guilty of first degree murder. Meinhardt stated that one witness had named van Haarlem as present at the Queen's Hotel and therefore urged the jury to find him guilty. The trial ended on 24 November 1979 with van Haarlem being acquitted on all charges.

== Later life ==
Despite his acquittal, van Haarlem found himself the object of police attention thereafter and his attempts to have the Crown return his property that had been seized were unsuccessful. Van Haarlem moved to Alberta to put the case behind him and married his girlfriend. In Edmonton, van Haarlem attended a party with Campbell who came up for a visit. Campbell beat up a construction worker who had insulted Satan's Choice, starting a brawl that led to van Haarlem using a baseball bat to beat up the friends of the man whom Campbell had assaulted. Van Haarlem left Satan's Choice and turned his back on his life of crime as he now runs his own welding business in Stony Plain, Alberta. In 1988, he told the journalist Mick Lowe: "The coppers have the upper hand. It wouldn't be so bad if you just got pinched for the things you did. But they can pinch you for anything, any time they want".

== Books ==
- Edwards, Peter (2013). Unrepentant The Strange and (Sometimes) Terrible Life of Lorne Campbell, Satan's Choice and Hells Angels Biker. Toronto: Vintage Canada. ISBN 9780307362575.
- Edwards, Peter (2017), Hard Road: Bernie Guindon and the Reign of the Satan's Choice Motorcycle Club, HarperCollins, ISBN 978-1443427258
- Kirby, Cecil; Renner, Thomas (1986). Mafia Enforcer. Toronto: Villard Books. ISBN 9780394544595.
- Langton, Jerry (2010). Showdown: How the Outlaws, Hells Angels and Cops Fought for Control of the Streets. Toronto: John Wiley & Sons. ISBN 978-0470678787.
- Lowe, Mick (2013). A Conspiracy of Brothers: A True Story of Bikers, Murder and the Law. Toronto: Vintage Canada. ISBN 978-0345813169.
