= David George Hoffman =

Canadian male criminal

David George Hoffman (born 3 March 1948) is a Canadian man wrongly convicted of murder, for which he served four years in prison before he was acquitted on an appeal.

== Satan's Choice ==
Hoffman was born on a farm between New Dundee and Plattsville. Unlike most outlaw bikers, Hoffman was a successful student who graduated with honors from the Waterloo Oxford Secondary School in 1966. In the spring of 1967, he joined the Preston (modern Cambridge) chapter of the Satan's Choice Motorcycle Club. Shortly afterwards, he began to work at the B.F. Goodrich Company factory in Kitchener. Unlike most members of Satan's Choice, Hoffman held a legitimate job and worked for a living. Hoffmann transferred over to the Kitchener chapter of Satan's Choice and served as the treasurer from October 1967 onward. A huge man whose hobby of weightlifting made even larger, Hoffman had the nickname of "Tee Hee" owing to his high-pitched laughter.

== The murder of William Matiyek ==
On the evening of 18 October 1978, Hoffman was due to an appointment at the clubhouse of the Kitchener chapter at about 7 pm, but was prevented from entering as the clubhouse had been raided by a joint task force led by Terry Hall consisting of members of the Royal Canadian Mounted Police, the Ontario Provincial Police (OPP), the Waterloo Regional Police and the Metro Toronto police. After being forced to wait for half an hour, Hoffman was allowed to enter the clubhouse and set out to buy a new lock to replace the one damaged by the police. After repairing the lock, Hoffman went home to his apartment at 20 Blucher Street to watch the news and go to bed. He planned to go to Stratford to rent some Halloween costumes from a store, Costumes by Collen, but called the store owner to say that he would not be able to make the trip owing to his need to repair the lock. During that time, William "Heavy" Matiyek of the rival Golden Hawk Riders was killed in the Queen's Hotel in Port Hope. At about 2 am, several of the men involved in the Queen's Hotel incident namely Richard Sauvé, Merv Blaker, and Gary Comeau arrived at Hoffman's apartment to ask for his aid in treating Comeau's wound.

== Arrest and Trial ==
During the investigation of the murder, Constable Donald Denis of the OPP showed the witnesses of Matiyek's killing photographs of various Satan's Choice bikers and asked them to identify any that they recognized. Several of the witnesses such as Gayle Thompson, Cathy Cotgrave, and Susan Foote picked Hoffman's photograph out of the array and named him as one of the men involved in the killing. On 2 November 1978, Hoffman was interviewed by Sam McReelis of the Port Hope police, Colin Cousens of the OPP and Detective Colquhoun of the Waterloo Regional Police, where he denied being involved in the murder and stated that he was in Kitchener that night. On 6 December 1978, Hoffman was arrested at the B.F. Gooderich factory on charges of first degree murder and conspiracy to commit murder. Hoffman was held at the county jail in Port Hope. On 18 December 1978, he was granted bail as he had no criminal record and his father, Henry Hoffman, agreed to place his farm as a surety. In August 1979, the Crown offered a plea bargain where the man who had confessed to killing Matiyek who was not charged with his murder, Lorne Edgar Campbell, would plea guilty to second degree murder while the "Port Hope 8" would all plea guilty to being accessories to murder and serve four years in prison. Hoffman rejected the plea bargain under the grounds that he was not in Port Hope and should not have to do any prison time for a crime he had not committed.

The trial for the Port Hope 8 as the accused were known began in London, Ontario on 4 September 1979. The Crown Attorney prosecuting the case, Chris Meinhardt, presented Matiyek's murder as first degree murder and alleged a conspiracy with Comeau serving as the killer and the rest of the accused blocking the exits to the bar-room of the Queen's Hotel. During the trial, Hoffman's lawyer, Ed Martin, introduced as evidence the records of Hoffman's phone calls on the evening of 18 October 1978 which supported his statements that he was in Kitchener. Meinhardt made much of the fact that several witnesses to the murder, namely Gayle Thompson, Cathy Cotgrave, Susan Foote, Rod Sterwart, and Helen Mitchell had identified him as one of the bikers present at the time of the murder. Collen Misener, the owner of Costumes by Collen testified for Hoffman as she stated that Hoffman had called her at about 7:55 pm. Hoffman had a receipt to show that he had indeed rented a custom from Misener's shop. A number of Satan's Choice bikers from the Kitchener chapter testified that Hoffman was replacing the lock for the clubhouse on the evening of 18 October, but Meinhardt was able to discredit those witnesses by bringing up their criminal records. On 24 November 1979, Hoffman was found guilty of second degree murder and sentenced to 10 years in prison. Brian Greenspan who represented Hoffman on his appeal felt that he was the victim of lookism as Hoffman with his huge, hulking frame and horn-rim glasses looked like a thug to such an extent that he felt any juror would convict him merely on the basis of his appearance.

== Acquittal ==
Hoffman served his sentence at Millhaven Institution maximum security prison. In 1980, for an appeal of the guilty verdict, Hoffman hired Brian Greenspan, the younger brother of the famous lawyer Eddie Greenspan, to serve as his defense counsel. Greenspan in turn was able to obtain the records of the telephone calls made from the Kitchener clubhouse, which the police had bugged. The police records showed that Hoffman had made three phone calls from the Kitchener clubhouse on 18 October with the last one starting at 8:40 and ending at 8:45 pm. In the last phone call to a biker named Joe Ertel, the latter stated that he would soon be joining Hoffman in replacing the lock, which supported Hoffman's statement that he was not in Port Hope at the time of the murder. The phone records made by Sauvé showed he had called the Toronto clubhouse twice on 18 October 1978, but had placed no calls to the Kitchener clubhouse. Meinhardt noted that the Crown's theory was that Sauvé was the mastermind of the murder plot and called the Toronto clubhouse to ask the bikers to come with him to the Queen's Hotel to kill Matiyek. Greenspan noted that the Crown's theory was that Sauvé had also phoned Hoffman to take part in the same murder, but there was no evidence that Sauvé contacted Hoffman at all prior to the murder.

On 13 April 1982, the Ontario Court of Appeals ruled for another trial for Hoffman was needed due to the new evidence discovered by Greenspan. Hoffman was acquitted of the murder, but found guilty of being an accessory after the fact. On 21 March 1983, Justice Gregory Evans sentenced Hoffman to four years in prison for being an accessory after the fact for Matiyek's murder. The fact that Hoffman was not in the Queen's Hotel at the time of the murder makes his murder conviction a very controversial one. Hoffman did not complain about his prison sentence and did not seek to turn Crown's evidence won him much respect within Satan's Choice. That the police had these intercepts of Hoffman's phone calls on 18 October 1978 all long, which were not disclosed by the Crown to the defense as per the rules regarding evidence disclosure, was controversial and the American journalist Mick Lowe feels that Hoffmann should never have been charged with Matiyek's murder, let alone convicted.

After serving his sentence, Hoffman resumed his career at B.F. Goodrich, married, and had two daughters. On 29 December 2000, Satan's Choice joined the Hells Angels. Hoffman was unwilling to join the Hells Angels and instead retired as a member in "good standing". In 2001, Hoffman's wife died of cancer, leaving him to raise his two daughters alone. He told Lowe that when his eldest daughter entered Wilfrid Laurier University in September 2012, it was one of the proudest moments of his life. Hoffman became active in weightlifting and served as the president of the Ontario Powerlifting Association, where he sought to combat steroid abuse in weightlifting. In 2013, the Canadian journalist Paul Dalby called Hoffman's conviction "a real travesty" of justice. Lowe said of Hoffman's conviction: “But they [the police] never disclosed it [the phone records] and they allowed this man to be convicted of a murder he did not commit and had nothing at all to do with. There is no argument about that. We know that for a fact.”

== Books ==
- Auger, Michel; Edwards, Peter (2012). The Encyclopedia of Canadian Organized Crime: From Captain Kidd to Mom Boucher. Toronto: McClelland & Stewart. ISBN 978-0771030499.
- Edwards, Peter (2013). Unrepentant The Strange and (Sometimes) Terrible Life of Lorne Campbell, Satan's Choice and Hells Angels Biker. Toronto: Vintage Canada. ISBN 9780307362575.
- Edwards, Peter (2017). Hard Road: Bernie Guindon and the Reign of the Satan's Choice Motorcycle Club. Toronto: Random House. ISBN 978-0345816108.
- Langton, Jerry (2010). Showdown: How the Outlaws, Hells Angels and Cops Fought for Control of the Streets. Toronto: John Wiley & Sons. ISBN 978-0470678787.
- Lowe, Mick (2013). A Conspiracy of Brothers: A True Story of Bikers, Murder and the Law. Toronto: Vintage Canada. ISBN 978-0345813169.
