= Richard Sauvé =

Former Canadian outlaw biker (born 1952)

Richard Michael Anthony Sauvé (born 27 July 1952) is a Canadian former outlaw biker, convicted of first degree murder in the Port Hope 8 case of 1979, turned social activist.

== Youth ==
Sauvé was born into a working class French-Canadian family in Cobourg, the son of Pierre and Adeline Sauvé. He obtained employment at the Davidison Rubber factory in Port Hope and in 1972 started to date a 15-year-old high school student, Sharon. Sharon became pregnant and the couple were married in a shotgun wedding in October 1973. Sauvé's bride was 16 years old and five months pregnant. Their daughter, Angela, was born in January 1974. Their marriage was a troubled one as Sauvé's teenage wife had much difficulty adjusting to being a mother and she came to feel trapped in the marriage as she felt that she no longer loved the man she called her husband.

After being fired from Davidison Rubber in 1975, Sauvé obtained employment at the Chemtron factory and became the president of the Steelworkers local. The couple lived a semi-nomadic lifestyle, moving about constantly before settling in a rented house in 1977. Reflecting tensions in his marriage, Sauvé decided to join the Peterborough chapter of the Satan's Choice Motorcycle Club in the same year as he felt happier in the company of his biker "brothers" than with his wife. Sauvé had been close to a Satan's Choice member, Merv Blaker, for a number of years and decided to join after Blaker agreed to sponsor him. Sharon Sauvé was very much opposed to her husband joining Satan's Choice, which she felt was an adverse influence on him, and felt the decision to join was done as an act of spite towards her.

As a member of Satan's Choice, Sauvé came into conflict with William "Heavy" Matiyek, the sergeant-at-arms of the rival Golden Hawk Riders. Matiyek was known as the "town bully" in Port Hope and usually carried around a shotgun and a handgun. In July 1977, when Sauvé was at work, Matiyek came by to shoot up Sauvé's house with his shotgun, forcing his wife and daughter to take cover. Sauvé was furious that Matiyek had tried to kill his wife and daughter and went to confront Matiyek with a baseball bat. Sauvé discovered that Matiyek was a coward as he apologized for the shooting incident, saying he was very drunk and high on drugs when he shot up the Sauvé house, and that he was unwilling to take up the challenge of a fight out of the fear that Sauvé would hurt him.

== The Matiyek murder ==
On the night of 18 October 1978, Sauvé received a phone call from a local drug addict, Brian Brideau, who told him that Matiyek was drinking at the Queen's Hotel and wanted to see him at once. Sauvé was afraid to see Matiyek-who had a reputation as a violent bully-alone and he started to phone around, asking various members of Satan's Choice to come with him to the Queen's Hotel. The only member of the Peterborough chapter whom Sauvé was able to contact was Merv "Indian" Blaker, who agreed to come with him to the Queen's Hotel. However, Sauvé felt that Blaker was too easy-going for a possible bar fight and he called the Toronto chapter at 9:19 pm where his call was answered by Gary "Nutty" Comeau. At 9: 30 pm, he again called Comeau, who agreed to go to the Queen's Hotel along with Lorne Edgar Campbell, Jeff McLeod, Larry "Beaver" Hurren and Armand "In the Truck" Sanguingi.

Sauvé arrived at the Queen's Hotel together with Blaker. An atmosphere of tension filled the barroom as everyone sensed a confrontation between Matiyek and the Satan's Choice bikers would soon occur. A waitress, Cathy Cotgrave, who knew both Sauvé and Blaker went to their table to tell them Satan's Choice members were banned from the Queen's Hotel and the two would not be served. Blaker ignored her by going to the bar to buy some matches and a drink from the bartender, who was his friend. Sauvé finally mustered up the courage to go sit down at Matiyek's table. He quickly learned that Matiyek did not want to see him as a very drunk Matiyek took to flashing his handgun and said he had "nine friends"-a statement understood to mean that he had 9 bullets in his gun. As Matiyek pointed his gun at him and spoke very loudly about wanting to kill him, Sauvé diplomatically tried to find a way to leave the table, but Matiyek forbade him from leaving as he stated he would shoot Sauvé if he tried to leave.

Comeau joined Sauvé at the table and was likewise threatened. Campbell-who had beaten Matiyek several times before-came over to help. Matiyek went for his gun, but Campbell shot him three times. Sauvé promptly left the Queen's Hotel via the John Street entrance. Sauvé got into Blaker's car and kept saying "holy fuck man, what happened?" Both Sauvé and Blaker were well known to the staff of the Queen's Hotel and both men assumed correctly that the waitresses would identify them to the police, leading to Sauvé and Blaker to both go the Toronto clubhouse of Satan's Choice, and from there to the house of David Hoffman, the treasurer of the Kitchener chapter.

== Arrest and Trial ==
Both Sauvé and Blaker had frequently drunk at the Queen's Hotel, and the waitresses at the Queen's Hotel identified both men by name to the police on the night of the murder as being present when Matiyek was killed. Corporal Terry Hall of the Ontario Provincial Police's Special Squad interviewed Sauvé about the murder on 31 October 1978. Sauvé admitted to being at the Queen's Hotel on the night of Matiyek's murder, but denied knowing anything about the murder.

On 5 December 1978, a warrant was issued for Sauvé's arrest on charges of conspiracy to commit murder. The charges were later increased to first-degree murder. Sauvé together with his wife had gone to Toronto to see Bob Seger and the Silver Bullet Band perform at the Maple Leaf Gardens in Toronto, and so he was only arrested the next day at his Port Hope house. He was denied bail and held at the Cobourg county jail. At his trial in London, Ontario, Sauvé was defended by a Legal-Aid Toronto lawyer, Jack Grossman. Sauvé favored a plea bargain with the Crown where he would pledge guilty to a lesser charge, but the Crown Attorney in charge of the "Port Hope 8 case", Chris Meinhardt, wanted all of the accused to make guilty pleas along with a statement that the killing of Matiyek had been a premediated act, which the "Port Hope 8" rejected.

The Crown Attorney at the trial, Chris Meinhardt, presented the case as a first-degree murder, calling it "a foul, horrible, planned execution." Meinhardt argued that there was a conspiracy to kill Matiyek with various Satan's Choice members blocking the exit points to the bar-room of the Queen's Hotel so that Matiyek could not escape while Comeau was the killer. Meinhardt painted Sauvé as the leader of the plot to kill Matiyek.

During the trial, Sauvé's best friend and best man at his wedding, Roger Davey, testified for the Crown that on the night of the murder, Sauvé had phoned him to tell Sharon Sauvé that he would not be in Port Hope for the next few days and there was a party going on in the background. Sauvé insists that Davey had committed perjury as he denied that there was a party to celebrate Matiyek's murder. Davey later admitted that his testimony was perjury and that he did not speak with Sauvé on the night of 18 October 1978. Another witness for the Crown, William Goodwin-who was friend of Sauvé's-testified that Sauvé had told him in July 1978 that he was planning to kill Matiyek soon. The way that Goodwin appeared as a surprise witness for the Crown with Grossman only being informed the night before that Meinhardt was going to call him as a witness left the defense with no time to prepare. Grossman argued that Goodwin's testimony was hearsay as he had no evidence to collaborate his testimony and that Goodwin never contacted the police with this information anytime before Matiyek's murder despite his claims to be appalled at the supposed murder plot.

Another witness for the Crown, David Gillispie, the town drunk of Port Hope, testified that he had heard Comeau to tell Sauvé and Blaker on the night of the murder "are we going to do it to this fat fucker now or what?" Gillispie testified Sauvé and Blaker very much wanted to kill Matiyek. The defense lawyers noted in Gillispie's prior statements to the police made on 19 October 1978, 28 November 1978 and 29 December 1978 all differed drastically on a number of details, which changed from statement to statement. Gillispie admitted that his testimony at the trial in 1979 differed "substantially" from his previous statements, but he claimed that his changing statements were to the fact that he was very drunk on the night of 18 October 1978 and he could not remember very well what happened. In his first statement to the police on 19 October 1978, Comeau's "fat fucker" remark to Sauvé and Blaker concerned who was going to speak to Matiyek first, not who was to kill him. Gillispie claimed that with much difficulty that he finally "remembered" what Comeau had really said to Sauvé and Blaker.

Grossman argued to the jury that it was illogical for Sauvé to take part in a premediated murder at the Queen's Hotel given that he was so well known to both the staff and patrons of the Queen's Hotel. On 24 November 1979, the jury announced its verdict. Sauvé was found guilty of first-degree murder and sentenced to life imprisonment. Sauvé showed no emotion at his sentence, but broke down in tears in front of his wife and daughter as he noted he was 27 years old and he would likely never see either of them again.

== In prison and release ==
Sauvé served his sentence at Millhaven Institution. Sauvé recalled: "When I went to prison, I wasn’t prepared for it. I had no concept of what happened in there. How do you prepare for that? I was scared and I didn’t know if I was ever getting out. I thought about giving up. I thought about suicide. I thought about escape. That’s what happens...You lose hope. And the longer you stay in prison, the farther away you get from yourself."

During his first three weeks at Millhaven, Sauvé saw three prisoners killed by other prisoners. Sauvé stated in 2018: “A guy a few cells down was stabbed to death and shoved under a bed in his cell...I remember seeing that and running back to my cell to make sure no one had stuffed a body under my bed. That happens to you after awhile — you learn to think that way. If you see someone walking down the rows in a big jacket, you begin to assume they are probably concealing a knife." During his four and half years at Millhaven, Sauvé saw a total of 12 prisoners killed by the other prisoners while also claiming that the prison guards routinely beat the prisoners.

In 1983, Sauvé was transferred to the Collins Bay Institution. During his time at Collins Bay, Sauvé converted to Buddhism and renounced his former lifestyle as he became a pacifist. Sauvé practiced transcendental meditation and refused the material possessions allowed the inmates such as a radio, a TV or books. The same year that Sauvé was sent to Collins Bay was also the same year Campbell arrived at Collins Bay. Sauvé was not angry with Campbell despite the fact that Sauvé was serving a life sentence for a crime committed by Campbell. However, despite his rejection of materialism, Sauvé secretly and illegally brewed moonshine (alcohol is illegal in Canadian prisons).

While at Collins Bay, the grade 10 drop-out Sauvé went on to earn his high school diploma, a BA in psychology from Queen's University, and a honours BA in criminology from the University of Ottawa. Sauvé worked in the prison store and used his $5.10 per day wage along with selling his artwork to pay for his tuition, which averaged $300 per course. In 1983, Sauvé sued the government of Canada over the law that disqualified prisoners from the right to vote. When Sauvé was awarded a BA in psychology, he was at first denied permission from the Crown to attend his convocation at Queen's University, which made frontpage news in newspapers across Canada. On 30 May 1987, Sauvé while wearing his scholar's gown and hat along with handcuffs and chains received his BA at the Queens convocation. He was then marched out by the police to take him back to Collins Bay. Sauvé's marriage ended in divorce. In 1989 Sauvé stated to date Michele Bradley, a co-ed from the University of Ottawa who became infatuated with him after meeting him in prison. Bradley met Sauvé when her criminology class visited Collins Bay to study him as an example of "lifer" prisoner. Sauvé married her on 5 January 1990 at the Collins Bay prison chapel.

In 1993, he won his voting rights case with the Supreme Court ruling that the law forbidding prisoners from voting violated the Charter of Right and Freedoms. In February 1994, a rally was held in Toronto by the Association in Defense of the Wrongly Convicted, where the boxer Rubin Carter spoke in favor of freedom for Sauvé, whom he called a wrongly convicted man. In 1995, Sauvé was released on parole. Sauvé was forced to resign from Satan's Choice as part of his parole conditions. After his release, Sauvé became active in the Life-Line program as he sought to mentor prisoners to reject criminality as a life of way. On 13 December 2017, Sauvé was awarded the Ed McIsaac Human Rights in Corrections Award, becoming the first prisoner to be so honored. Sauvé lives at present at a farmhouse outside of Lindsay along with his wife, Michele Sauvé, and a menagerie of cats.

== Books ==
- Edwards, Peter (2013). Unrepentant The Strange and (Sometimes) Terrible Life of Lorne Campbell, Satan's Choice and Hells Angels Biker. Toronto: Vintage Canada. ISBN 9780307362575.
- Langton, Jerry (2010). Showdown: How the Outlaws, Hells Angels and Cops Fought for Control of the Streets. Toronto: John Wiley & Sons. ISBN 978-0470678787.
- Lowe, Mick (2013). A Conspiracy of Brothers: A True Story of Bikers, Murder and the Law. Toronto: Vintage Canada. ISBN 978-0345813169.
