= Brian Greenspan =

Canadian lawyer (born 1947)

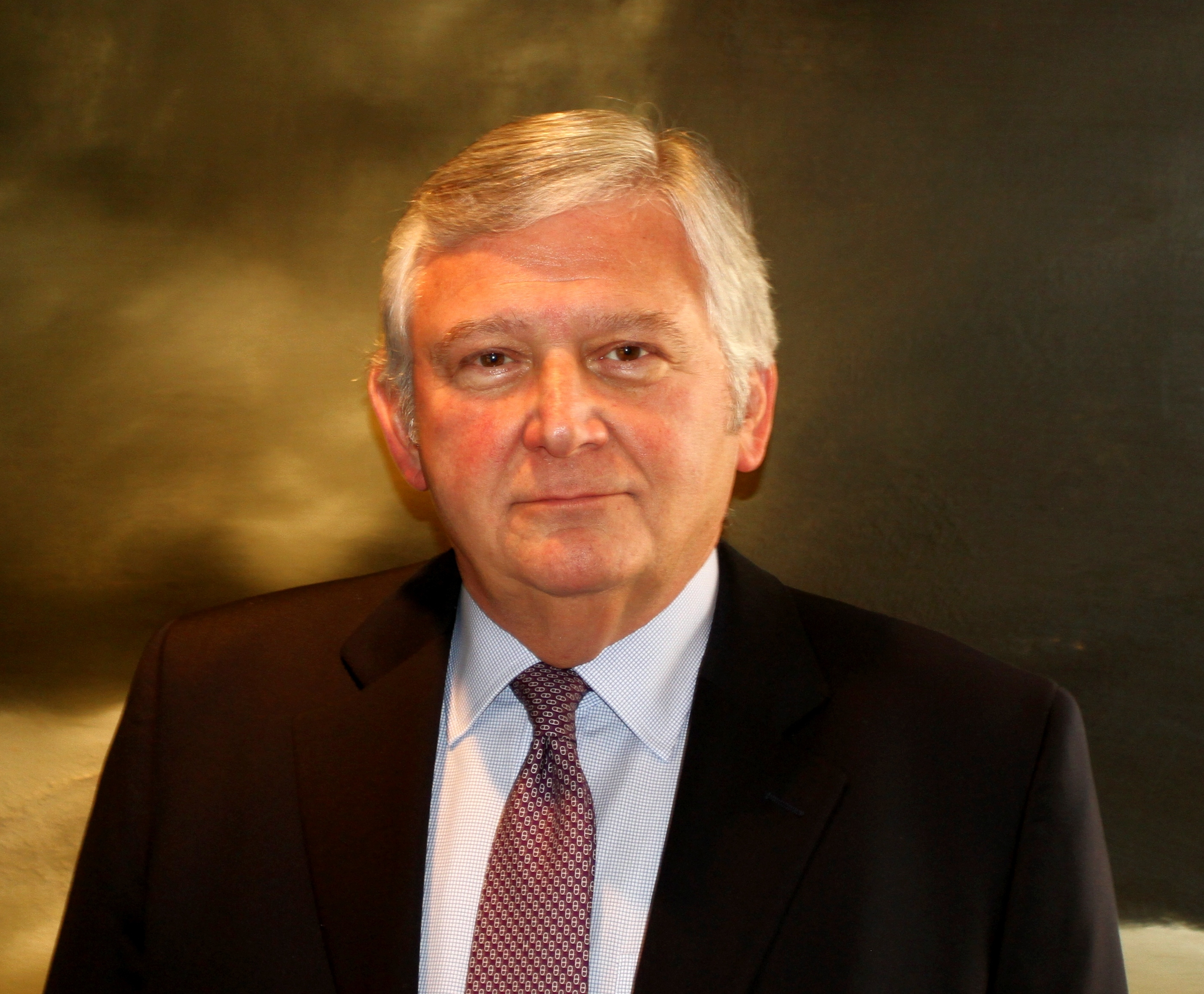
Brian Greenspan in Toronto, 2012

Brian H. Greenspan, (born March 14, 1947 in Niagara Falls, Ontario) is a Canadian criminal defence lawyer. He is the senior partner in the Toronto firm Greenspan, Humphrey, Makepeace LLP and one of the most prominent defence lawyers in Canada.

== Career ==
Greenspan received a B.A. from the University of Toronto in 1968 and a LL.B. from Osgoode Hall Law School in 1971. He received his LL.M. degree from the London School of Economics in London in 1972. He was called to the bar in 1974. He taught the Administration of Criminal Justice at Osgoode Hall Law School from 1977 to 1984 and was a special lecturer in Criminal Law at the Faculty of Law, University of Toronto Law School from 1984 to 1998.

Greenspan is a senior partner in Greenspan, Humphrey, Makepeace, a Toronto firm. He is the brother of the late Edward Greenspan, also a well-known Canadian lawyer, and Rosann Greenspan, executive director of the Center for Law and Society (retired) at the University of California, Berkeley in Berkeley. Brian Greenspan and Marla Berger are married and the parents of Jared and Jenna Greenspan and the grandparents of Lucy, Greta, Sam, and Oliver.

Greenspan was president of the Criminal Lawyers' Association (Ontario) from 1989 to 1993 and was the founding chair of the Canadian Council of Criminal Defence Lawyers from 1992 to 1996. Greenspan is a Fellow of the American College of Trial Lawyers, a Fellow of the International Society of Barristers and Litigation Counsel of America. He was awarded the Douglas K. Laidlaw Medal for excellence in oral advocacy in 2002 and received the G. Arthur Martin Medal for contributions to criminal justice in Canada in 2010. In 2012, he was recognized by the Law Society of Upper Canada with an honorary Doctor of Laws degree. In 2013, he was awarded the Alumni Gold Key for Achievement by Osgoode Hall; received the "Key to the City" of his hometown, Niagara Falls; and was named by University College of the University of Toronto as one of its "Alumni of Influence". In 2020, Greenspan was honored by the Toronto Lawyers Association with the Award of Distinction, was the Milvain Chair in Advocacy at the University of Calgary Faculty of Law and received Chambers Canada's Lifetime Achievement Award. He is a member of the Board of Directors of the Innocence Canada Foundation and has been recognized in The International Who's Who of Business Crime Lawyers and The Best Lawyers in Canada since their inception. He is a Band 1 leading individual in White Collar Crime in Chambers Canada. He has been listed three times as one of the 25 Most Influential Lawyers in Canada by Canadian Lawyer Magazine. Greenspan was also named one of the 50 Most Influential Torontonians by Toronto Life in 2021.

== Notable clients ==
Greenspan's clients include:

- Alan Eagleson, hockey agent and founder of NHL Players' Association
- Peter Nygard, former fashion executive convicted of sexual assault
- Naomi Campbell, model
- Myron Gottlieb, co-founder and president of Livent
- Cathy Smith, accused in the death of John Belushi
- Rob Ramage, retired hockey player charged with dangerous driving causing the death of Keith Magnuson
- Omar Khadr, accused of war crimes (on behalf of the Criminal Lawyers' Association)
- Armour Pharmaceutical Company, acquitted of providing contaminated haemophilia blood products
- Andrew Rankin, investment banker, acquitted of insider trading, convicted of stock tipping
- Douglas Dunsmuir, CEO of Royal Group Technologies, acquitted of fraud
- Dr. George Doodnaught, anesthetist charged with sexual assault
- Dr. Nancy Morrison, palliative care physician, acquitted of murder
- Justin Bieber, singer
- Greg Logan, former Mountie convicted of smuggling narwhal tusks
- Marco Muzzo, pleaded guilty to the deaths of three young children and their grandfather in a car crash while driving drunk
- Thomas Baker, lawyer and former CEO of 7-Up Canada acquitted of tax evasion
- Mike DaSilva, acquitted of the murder of Canadian boxing champion Eddie Melo
- Robert K. Waxman, director of Philip Services Corp.
- Boaz Manor, CEO of Portus International[36]
- Sherman family, investigating the deaths of Barry and Honey Sherman
- Abul Hasan Chowdhury, acquitted in the $1.2 Billion dollar Padma Bridge graft scandal.
- Keith Hobbs, mayor of Thunder Bay acquitted of extortion
- Dan Potter, CEO of Knowledge House
- Kevin O'Leary's family, Linda O'Leary acquitted in boating accident.
- Pat Sorbara, acquitted of Election Act charges
- Floyd Smith, former coach of the Toronto Maple Leafs acquitted of criminal negligence
- Steve Murray, acquitted of murder in the disappearance of his daughter, Misty Murray
- Frank Stronach, Austro-Canadian billionaire businessman, horse owner, breeder and politician
- Doug Dales, founder of P.S. Production Services
