= Mick Lowe =

Canadian writer (1947–2021)

Michael (Mick) Ellenwood Lowe (23 September 1947 – 17 April 2021) was an author, journalist, and writer based in Sudbury, Ontario, whose work appeared in a range of Canadian publications including Maclean's, Canadian Business, Canadian Lawyer, The Globe and Mail, the Financial Post Magazine and Northern Ontario Business.

== Early life ==
Born in Omaha, Nebraska in 1947 to Jack and Grace (Ellenwood) Lowe. About his youth, he recalled: "I was a reader. I loved to read. I liked to read about kids going to West Point, the Naval Academy, and jet fighter pilots. I was all into the American military Second World War stories. It's kind of funny then that I became a draft dodger." As a university student, he was a member of Students for a Democratic Society and was involved in campus protests against the Vietnam war.

He fled to Canada in 1970 as a draft dodger. Lowe recalled:

"You do not leave your country, your home, your family, lightly. And of course, you're totally brainwashed, even though you're beginning to question it, that you're in the greatest country in the world, the greatest country in history, the greatest country the world has ever seen. So you think about going to this other place called Canada. What's up with North? It's cold up there, but you don't know anything else about it and you try to study up on it. But it's hard to get info about Canada because no one in the States, as you know, knows that the first damn thing about Canada and neither did I... I could go to jail, live underground the rest of my life, always looking over my shoulder in the states, or go north and take a chance, a huge, colossal chance. And I took that chance. In hindsight it's the best risk I've ever taken."

== Career ==
Lowe worked as a staff writer at the Lincoln Daily Star (1967–68), staff writer and columnist at the Daily Nebraskan (1966–68), staff writer at The Georgia Straight (Vancouver) (1970–72), co-founder of The Grape (Western Voice) (Vancouver) (1972), editor at The Gauntlet (1973–74), freelance correspondent for The Globe and Mail (1974-1988), staff reporter and producer of Morning North at CBCS-FM (1977–78), and a lecturer in journalism at Cambrian College (1988).

== Writer ==
Lowe's first non-fiction book, A Conspiracy of Brothers about the Port Hope 8 case, which was a national bestseller and winner of the Arthur Ellis Award for Best NonFiction Crime Book in 1989. His second book was a biography of prisoner rights advocate Claire Culhane, One Woman Army: The Life of Claire Culhane. Then he wrote a book on the rush to exploit the Voisey's Bay nickel deposit, Premature Bonanza: Standoff at Voisey's Bay.

Lowe began writing a fictional series about Sudbury's mining history called the Nickel Range Trilogy. These books are based upon the premise that because the United States has no nickel of its own, forcing American companies to import nickel (a metal crucial for tempering steel) from Sudbury, the violent history of Sudbury was part of a long-term "destabilization campaign" waged by the Central Intelligence Agency (CIA) to ensure that American control of the nickel mines of Sudbury. Lowe admitted there was no evidence for the thesis he presented in his novels, but believed that one day evidence would emerge. Lowe believed that because the CIA waged a "destabilization campaign" against the government of the Marxist President Salvador Allende between 1970 and 1973 after he nationalized the copper mines of Chile owned by American companies, then it was plausible to believe that the CIA would want the nickel mines of northern Ontario under pro-American control.

The first book in the series, The Raids, is set in 1963, during a particularly violent time in Sudbury's history: the Steelworkers' raids on the then-powerful Mine Mill union. The second book, The Insatiable Maw, set in 1968, and is about health and safety concerns associated with the Copper Cliff Smelter. The 1978-1979 Steelworkers strike is the subject of Wintersong, the third and final volume in the Nickel Range Trilogy.

== Books ==
- Conspiracy of Brothers: A True Story of Bikers, Murder, and the Law - 1988
- One Woman Army: The Life of Claire Culhane - 1992
- Premature Bonanza: Standoff at Voisey's Bay - 1998
- The Raids: The Nickel Range Trilogy, Volume I - 2014
- The Insatiable Maw: The Nickel Range Trilogy, Volume II - 2015
- Wintersong: The Nickel Range Trilogy, Volume III - 2017
