= Michel Dubé =

Canadian outlaw biker and gangster (1958–1998)

- Born: Michel Alexandre Dubé; 23 November 1958; Sudbury, Ontario, Canada
- Died: 22 September 1998 (aged 39); Sudbury, Ontario, Canada
- Occupations: Outlaw biker, gangster
- Allegiance: Satan's Choice MC

Michel Alexandre Dubé (23 November 1958 – 22 September 1998) was a Canadian outlaw biker and gangster. President of the Sudbury, Ontario chapter of the Satan's Choice Motorcycle Club, Dubé committed suicide in jail after being charged with two counts of first-degree murder and the bombing of a police station.

== Criminal career ==
=== Chapter president ===
Dubé was born in and grew up in Sudbury, a mining city in northern Ontario. Dubé became the president of the Sudbury chapter of the Satan's Choice Motorcycle Club. According to his associate, Todd Petahtegoose, Dubé murdered a 13-year-old boy in 1986, which he was able to pass off as a suicide.

Dubé was the prime suspect in the murder of Claude Briere, a locally prominent drug dealer who had been his friend since childhood. Briere disappeared in September 1988. Dubé was assisted in killing Briere by Alexander Sretenovic, aka Alex Atso, a "hang-around" with the Satan's Choice Sudbury chapter. Briere's corpse was discovered in a forest outside of Whitefish on 17 October 1988. The cause of death was by a firearm.

Len Isnor of the Ontario Provincial Police (OPP)'s Anti-Biker Unit called Dubé the most dangerous outlaw biker in Ontario. According to those who knew him, Dubé's fondest wish was to attach a powerful bomb to a loaded fuel tanker and to drive it in a suicide attack into a police station in order to kill himself and as many policemen as possible. Dubé's brother, Richard, stated: "He couldn’t turn it around. Prison life was too hard for him. I think there is psychosis produced in those places. When he came out, he was scary. I was even scared of him". The psychiatrist Anthony McFarthing who examined Dubé classified him as a psychopath.

On a Saturday night on the Labour Day weekend in 1992, Dubé was involved in a bloody brawl known in biker circles as the "Sudbury Saturday Night" In the parking lot of the Sorrento Motor Hotel, a group of Satan's Choice bikers, led by their national president Bernie Guindon, fought against the Black Diamond Riders, led by their national president Harry Paul Barnes. The "Sudbury Saturday Night" brawl ended with the Black Diamond Riders beaten up and forced to go to the hospital.

In August 1996, Sretenovic boasted to Petahtegoose that he helped Dubé kill Briere in 1988. Petahtegoose testified that he went to Dubé and told him. Sretenovic was last seen alive on the night of 14 August 1996. According to Petahtegoose, Dubé told him that he killed Sretenovic and helped him dispose of the corpse, which was dumped in one of the vast forests that cover northern Ontario. Stretenovic's skeleton was discovered in a forest outside of Sudbury in May 2019, and foul play is strongly suspected as the cause of his death.

Dubé was especially close to the professional wrestler Ion Croitoru, the president of Satan's Choice Hamilton chapter. Both Dúbe and Croitoru purchased the cocaine for their chapters from Richard Vallée of the Hells Angels' Quebec Nomad chapter based in Montreal. The profiles of Sudbury and Hamilton, both largely working class cities that once been flourishing and gone into decline made the ties between the Sudbury and Hamilton chapters of Satan's Choice to be quite close. Isnor observed that Dubé and Croitoru were often seen together, but that Dubé was the more dangerous of the two. The Anti-Biker Unit had police cars stationed outside of all the Satan's Choice clubhouses to observe who was entering and leaving, inspiring Croitoru to come out and talk to the policemen outside of the Hamilton clubhouse. By contrast, Isnor noted that Dubé did not talk to the policemen outside of the Sudbury clubhouse, instead giving them angry glares and various rude gestures.

In October 1996, Petahtegoose was arrested after a car chase outside of Espanola. Petahtegoose was charged with dangerous driving and the possession of an illegal weapon, stolen property and narcotics. Petahtegoose turned Crown's evidence out of the belief that Dubé was planning to kill him.

=== The police station bombing ===
In late 1996, Croitoru was visiting Sudbury to see Dubé. In the parking lot of the Solid Gold strip club, Croitoru was astonished to see the members of the Sudbury chapter take off their jackets with their patches and place them inside of the trunks of their cars. When he inquired as to why, he was informed that the Solid Gold had a policy of refusing admittance to those wearing gang colors. Croitoru roared at the top of his voice "We wear our colors wherever the fuck we want!", which inspired Dubé to shout "fuck yeah!" in agreement. The assembled Satan's Choice bikers then walked up to the entrance of the Solid Gold wearing jackets with their Satan's Choice patches, where the bouncers promptly refused them all admittance. Infuriated, the bikers continued to try to force their way into the Solid Gold, and the police were called.

Later that same night, Croitoru, Dubé and the others went to the Coulson Tavern strip club in downtown Sudbury, where Dubé brooded obsessively over their humiliation at the Solid Gold. Afterwards, Croitoru and Dubé went across Larch Street to an all-night sandwich shop, where Dubé maintained that he would do anything to have his revenge against the owners of the Solid Gold, leading Croitoru to say that there was a member of the Hamilton chapter who knew how to build bombs. The journalist Jerry Langton wrote that Croitoru looked tough with his bulging muscles, but that he was an essentially weak character who was always too willing to please those he considered to be his friends such as Dubé.

Seeking revenge, Croitoru had a member of the Hamilton chapter, Jure "Jerry" Juretta, build a bomb. Juretta was a former soldier in the Canadian Army and was an expert with explosives. Croitoru and Juretta then drove to Sudbury to hand over the bomb to Dubé. The bomb was handed over by Croitoru and Juretta to Dubé and vice-president Brian Davies of the Sudbury chapter at a Tim Horton's in the Lockerby district of Sudbury.

However, Dubé decided to blow up the Sudbury police station instead. The bomb was planted by Neil Passenen, a friend of Dubé's. The bombing occurred at 2 am just after a Christmas party on 15 December 1996, and only one police dispatcher was wounded by the blast. Isnor gave as the motive for the bombing that: "He [Dubé] had a dislike for police. Didn't matter if it was Sudbury Regional, OPP, RCMP. He disliked police. That was probably the main reason". In December 1997, Dúbe was arrested for the bombing. In July 1998, Petahtegoose testified at a preliminary inquiry that Dubé had murdered Briere and Sretenovic, leading to Dubé being indicted on two counts of first-degree murder.

=== Suicide ===
Facing charges related to the bombing plus two counts of first-degree murder for the deaths of Sretenovic and Briere, Dubé hanged himself in the Sudbury jail on 22 September 1998. In his suicide note, Dubé wrote: "Waiting around and not being able to take more jail time has (driven) me to this. Take another look at your so-called, reliable witnesses. Fabricated lies. Justice in Ontario". Isnor explained Dubé's suicide as: "Johnny K-9 [Croitoru] was the only friend he had left in the world, and he knew that we had him, and he was going away forever." By contrast, Lorne Campbell, the president of Satan's Choice Oshawa chapter who knew Dubé well, stated that he been very depressed during his last time in prison and the prospect of spending the rest of his life in prison was so depressing to him that he felt compelled to take his own life.

== Books ==
- Edwards, Peter (2013). Unrepentant The Strange and (Sometimes) Terrible Life of Lorne Campbell, Satan's Choice and Hells Angels Biker. Toronto: Vintage Canada. ISBN 9780307362575.
- Edwards, Peter (2017). Hard Road: Bernie Guindon and the Reign of the Satan's Choice Motorcycle Club. Toronto: Random House. ISBN 978-0345816108.
- Langton, Jerry (2010). Showdown: How the Outlaws, Hells Angels and Cops Fought for Control of the Streets. Toronto: John Wiley & Sons. ISBN 978-0470678787.
