= Harley Davidson Guindon =

Canadian businessperson, ex-outlaw biker and criminal

Harley Guindon
- Born: Harley Davidson Guindon; 15 October 1985 (age 41); Oshawa, Ontario Canada
- Occupation: Clothing salesman
- Years active: 2007–present
- Known for: Multiple criminal convictions
- Convictions: Extortion with a gun (2007); Forcible confinement and assault of a female (2007); Assault causing bodily harm (2007); Assault (2009); Trafficking Cocaine and Heroin (2012); Impersonating a peace officer, Robbery, Assault (2015); Fraud (2015)
- Penalty: 2 years imprisonment (2005); 5 years' imprisonment (2007); 2 years imprisonment (2009); 3 years imprisonment (2012); 2 years imprisonment (2015)

Harley Davidson Guindon (born 15 October 1985) is a clothing salesman, a convicted violent offender, and a convicted drug dealer.

== Early life ==
Guindon was born in Oshawa, the son of Bernie Guindon, the national president of Satan's Choice Motorcycle Club, and his girlfriend, a stripper known by her stage name Angel. Owing to his mother's substance abuse, Guindon was raised solely by his father along with another of his girlfriends from the age of 4 onward. Lorne Edgar Campbell, the Oshawa chapter president of Satan's Choice served as Guindon's babysitter when his father and stepmother were out. Campbell recalled about young Guindon: "He came out with the gloves on and smashed me in the nose. I thought, you little fucker. Then I sent him to bed."

Guindon had some difficulty attending Holy Cross Catholic Elementary School as the principal took the name Satan's Choice literally and believed that the Guindon family were devil worshippers. The principal told the media that Guindon had been suspended because: "Being a Roman Catholic school, we don't choose Satan. We choose Jesus Christ". To annoy the teachers, Bernie Guindon took his son to Holy Cross school on his motorcycle. Guindon recalled that one of his vivid childhood memories was watching someone with an ax try to behead his father in front of his house and that: "I can remember this as clear as day. The guy was ready to cut his head off and he [Bernie] slid like a boxer, throwing out a jab and knocked the attacker out cold upon the lawn". Guindon recalled how his father dragged the man who just tried to behead him inside of his garage to give him a beating and then took him inside their house to tell his son that he loved him. Guindon recalled that because of his father's appearance, he was often cast as an extra playing a thug in various films shot in the Toronto area such as My Date with the President's Daughter, Jungle Movie, Blues Brothers 2000 and Kung Fu: The Legend Continues. Guindon stated it was a highlight of his childhood to visit the film sets where his father was working and to visit the trailer of the actor John Goodman on the set of Blue Brothers 2000 in 1997.

On 28 June 1996, Bernie Guindon retired as the national president of Satan's Choice to spend more time with his son. Guindon followed his father's footsteps by taking boxing as his main hobby as a teenager. At the age of 15, Guindon left home to live with his older half-sister Shannan Dionne and her daughter Rori Hache. Guindon stated of his teenage years: "After leaving my sister's on good terms, I move right into the worst part of Oshawa, the real south end. There were times I drank hot water in the winter to stay warm and had migraines from not eating for days at a time. Then I started selling dope and stealing cars and got myself into trouble. We probably stole about three hundred cars. We'd go joy-riding". Guindon was convicted several times of assault, and served his sentence at the Brookside Youth Centre in Cobourg.

== Criminal activities ==
Guindon joined a street gang known variously as the Baby Blue Chippin' Crew, the Crippin Crew and finally as the Cash Money Brothers that sold crack cocaine. Guindon said of the gang: "You have a group of white guys selling a black drug, crack cocaine, in a black area". On 2 June 2005, one of Guindon's fellow gang members, Brandon Saville, was murdered on the Erie Street Bridge in Oshawa. Guindon asked his father, who was in the Hells Angels at the time, for a gun and was refused. Guindon recalled: "He flat out told me no. I was understanding, but disgruntled because the streets were a wild place at the time and I wanted to protect myself". In December 2005, Guindon was arrested by the Ontario Provincial Police as part of Project Superman. Guindon was originally charged with sexual assault. Mayor John Mutton praised police for getting Guindon off the streets. Guindon's father, Bernie, was convicted of sexual assault of a 15-year-old girl for three days in 1968 along with four other men. Bernie served five years for the crime.

In early 2007, Guindon made a plea bargain with the Crown where he pleaded guilty to one count of extortion with a gun; two counts of forcible confinement and two counts of assault causing bodily harm in exchange for the Crown dropping the charges of attempted murder against him. In March 2007, he started serving his five-year prison sentence at Millhaven Institution. Guindon was soon transferred to Collins Bay Institution. On 3 May 2007, Paul Murray, the Crown Attorney who made the plea bargain with Guindon wrote to the National Parole Board opposing any early parole for him. Murray wrote: "He has shown a complete disregard for the rules of society or for authority. I have attached a number of police intelligence reports that highlight his audacity and attitude towards the police, including threatening officers as well as other gang activity and violence. If he is prepared to take this position towards law enforcement officials, one can only presume that his level of disdain for the rights of normal citizens is greater...Mr. Guindon will do what he wants to get what he wants, and if such involves violence or guns, then so be it. He is a dangerous individual who will no doubt revert to the only lifestyle he has embraced if given the opportunity: that of a violent drug dealer; he revels in violence". Guindon was released on parole in 2009 and was sent back to Collins Bay for parole violations. On 18 November 2009, he became father when his girlfriend gave birth to his son. Guindon went on a violent rampage when prison officials refused his request to see his son, and was placed in solitary confinement for his attacks on other prisoners. Guindon recalled that he was extremely angry when denied permission to see his son and that: "After this, I went haywire, punched a few guys out and went to the hole for being a threat to the safety and security of the institution". Guindon was sent back to Millhaven.

At Millhaven, Guindon became a close friend of Juan Ramon Fernandez, the Spanish gangster who served as the Toronto agent for the Mafiosi Vito Rizzuto and Gregory Woolley, the president of the Rockers, a Hells Angels puppet gang. Guindon planned to go into "business" with Fernadnez-whom he called "Ray"-after his release, saying: "Ray's not a storyteller. If he says he's going to do something, he does it". About Woolley, Guindon stated: "He was always smiling. He was always laughing. He was the best chess player I've played". Guindon estimates that he played 2,5000 games of chess with Woolley. In late 2010, Guindon was released on parole, but he was sent to Kingston Penitentiary in February 2011 for violating his parole by associating with criminals. At Kingston Penitentiary, Guindon was involved in a prison riot. Guindon recalled that Kingston Penitentiary was a very violent prison as he stated: "There were too many stabbings to count or be able to remain solid if I spoke about the details. It was rare to see a fist fight, and even those are in action, nine times out of ten, there's a shank on someone's hip". On 15 April 2011, he was once released on parole. In 2011, Constable James Ebdon of the Durham Regional Police Service (local police for Oshawa, Ontario) was recorded as engaged in a profanity-ridden rant to Bradley Cox in front of a crackhouse where he threatened to plant cocaine on Cox and charge him with drug trafficking and assault, saying that he knew that Cox worked for Guindon, whom Ebdon claimed was the biggest drug dealer in Oshawa.

Guindon was arrested on 16 August 2012 as part of Project Kingfisher on charges of drug trafficking. At the time of his arrest, he was described as being a "prospect" with the Hells Angels. A police officer told the media in 2012 that Guindon was a "prospect" with the Hells Angels as early as 2005, a claim that Guindon denies. A prison report dated 14 December 2012 stated: "Overall, while in institutional custody, Guindon's conduct can be described as very poor and he was noted to be heavily entrenched in the criminal, gang, and drug subculture of the institution, with ongoing connections to these elements in the community". In 2013, Guindon's friend Fernandez was murdered in a Mafia killing in Sicily. Guindon stated about Fernandez's murder: "I had a lot of plans with Ray. For him to get taken out, it kind of hits home". In March 2014, Guindon joined the Hells Angels as a "full patch" member. About his decision to join the Hells Angels in 2014, Guidnon stated in an interview: "Why not join? It's my life story. I'm now a federal offender anyways. I understood that I'm already a marked man".

Guindon's charges related to Project Kingfisher were stayed by the Crown in 2015. No reason was given by the Crown for the decision not to move forward to trial. It later emerged that the dismissal was caused by the Ebdon scandal. In 2013, the recording of Ebdon in 2011 threatening to frame Cox for assault and cocaine trafficking was uploaded to YouTube and had attracted over a million views by 2015. In 2015, Guindon launched a legal challenge to have the Project Kingfisher evidence against him excluded from the coming trial under the grounds that Ebdon had engaged in illegal tactics such as threatening to plant drugs as a way to force witnesses to turn Crown's evidence. In September 2015, Justice Laura Bird in a ruling stated that after viewing the Ebdon video that Ebdon was "not a credible or reliable witness" and dismissed the charges against Guindon under the grounds that Ebdon had "committed several criminal offenses in the course of his duties".

In October 2015, Guindon was arrested following a car chase by the police on charges of robbery, impersonating a police officer, possession of illegal guns, forcible confinement, and three counts of assault. Guindon met a prisoner at the Napanee jail who had once belonged to the Rock Machine and who insulted the Hells Angels, leading to Guindon to beat him up. Guindon was sent to the Lindsay jail as a punishment. In March 2017, Guindon led a hunger strike by the prisoners at the Lindsay jail to protest living conditions. Guindon was the last of 30 prisoners to stop eating. Later in 2017, the charges were stayed by the Crown. In August 2017, Guindon denounced an attempt to revive the Satan's Choice biker gang as "disrespectful".

In 2017, his niece Rori Hache was murdered. In a 2018 interview, Guindon denied that his Hells Angels membership had anything with Hache's murder, telling the journalist Jake Edmiston: "The rules of being a biker is there's no women, no kids. So that's why you don't hear of that shit — because it doesn't happen. If we've got a problem with a guy we're going to go after the guy, we're not going to go after his fucking niece or somebody he loves." Guindon stated that he did not know Adam Strong, the man charged with the rape, murder and dismemberment of Hache after her severed head was found inside of Strong's refrigerator. On 16 March 2021, Strong was convicted of first-degree murder for killing Hache.

== Businessman ==
Guindon is a businessman in Oshawa and has close links to Progressive Conservative Party of Ontario. In 2017, he opened a clothing store, Harley G's. Guindon's name continued to be mentioned in the media in connection with the Hells Angels as late as 2020, but Guindon insisted in 2022 that he has left the Hells Angels. He has argued that he has turned back on his former life of crime and is now a legitimate businessman. Guindon is a successful clothier and has the image of a public spirited businessman generous in helping the less fortunate in society. The Oshawa city councilor Brian Nicholson has stated that "negative activity" in south Oshawa has stopped since Guindon moved Harley G's into the neighborhood and that: "Since they moved to the new space, I've have found their operation to be like a shot in the arm for the neighborhood. Any new investment we can have along the south Simcoe corridor is important — the key to that corridor is bringing in businesses and having people there on a daily basis".

Guindon is a close friend of John Mutton, the former mayor of Clarington. In an Instagram post, Guindon praised Mutton for introducing him to "the moguls of politics, media, marketing, franchise owners, billionaire developers, producers and much more." Mutton served as Clarington mayor from 2000 to 2006. His re-election bid in 2006 and a campaign for Durham Regional chair in 2018 were derailed following allegations of spousal abuse, which he has denied. In October 2021, Mutton and Guindon were photographed at a meeting of the exclusive Albany Club in Toronto, which calls itself "the premier private club for leaders in Canada's business and Conservative political spheres." Mutton is a wealthy businessman who is a leading contributor to the Ontario PC party and he has been photographed at PC party events alongside the premier Doug Ford. In 2023, Mutton was accused of being the mysterious "Mr. X" who had illegally lobbied to have land redeveloped in the Greenbelt. In 2022, Guindon left the Hells Angels. On 7 April 2022, Guindon was photographed with Mutton and the Conservative MPP and cabinet minister David Piccini at an election event, which caused some controversy. Piccini admits that Mutton is a long-standing friend, but denies that he knew that Guindon had a criminal record. In April 2025, Guindon performed at a concert in London, Ontario sponsored by Joe Stokes, a member of the Hells Angels London chapter.

Guindon still owns his clothing store, Harley Gs, despite being in non compliance with the Canadian government, who dissolved his business in 2023 for failing to pay taxes from sales. . Guindon continues to operate his dissolved business.

== Satan's Choice ==
In August 2025, Guindon reformed the Satan's Choice biker gang his father had founded in 1965. In an interview on YouTube, Guindon stated: "It’s my father’s club, and I feel like with his permission, I have the right to do that. The reason behind why I’m doing this is because I want to bring back the morale of motorcycling. It’s not just about a corporation. I want to ride my bike across the country and go to each clubhouse and have a good time like the old days...It’s not about money to me and I’m going to keep it about what it’s supposed to be...brotherhood". James Dubro, an organized crime expert stated: :"It might be a way of bringing more younger people into the Ontario organized crime biker world by a kind of make-bikers-great-again pitch as some have soured on the HA reputation. I wouldn’t have thought they’d relaunch it, to be honest". Guindon is active on social media and is at present engaged in an online feud on Facebook and TikTok with two members of the Hells Angels Oshawa chapter. He has repeatedly called the two Hells Angels "goofs", a word considered to be the worse insult in the Canadian underworld, and has accused the duo of faking court documents designed to make it seem like he is a police informer. Guindon noted that police documents do not generally refer to subjects by their first names as the alleged documents posed online do, and has stated the documents are crude forgeries generated by AI. Guindon claims to have chapters of Satan's Choice in every province along with the United States and Costa Rica.

== Books ==
- Edwards, Peter (2017). Hard Road: Bernie Guindon and the Reign of the Satan's Choice Motorcycle Club. Toronto: Random House. ISBN 978-0345816108.
