= Satan's Choice Motorcycle Club =

Outlaw motorcycle club

Satan's Choice MC
- Founded: 1965; 61 years ago
- Founder: Bernie Guindon
- Founding location: Oshawa, Ontario, Canada
- Years active: 1965–2000, 2017, 2025–present
- Membership (est.): 400 (1969) 34 chapters in Canada 4 in USA and 2 in Finland 230-950+ (2025)
- Leaders: Bernie Guindon; Jack Olliffe; Garnet McEwen; Andre Wattel; Harley Guindon
- Activities: Drug trafficking, prostitution, theft, assault, murder
- Allies: Outlaws MC (1974–1977); Hells Angels MC (1996–2000); Devil's Disciples MC
- Rivals: Hells Angels MC (1974–1995); Outlaws MC (1977–2000); Black Diamond Riders MC; Loners MC; Popeye MC
- Notable members: Brian Beaucage; Howard Doyle Berry; Merv Blaker; Phillip Boudreault; Lorne Campbell; Gary Comeau; Ion Croitoru; Michel Dubé; Steven Gault; David Hoffman; Larry Hurren; Cecil Kirby; Frank Lenti; Jeff McLeod; Mario Parente; Gennaro Raso; Armand Sanguigni; Richard Sauvé; Gordon van Haarlem

Satan's Choice Motorcycle Club (SCMC) is a Canadian outlaw motorcycle club. Once the dominant outlaw club in Ontario, with twelve chapters based in the province, and another in Montreal, Quebec, at its peak strength in 1977. Satan's Choice grew to more than 400 members by 1970, making it the second largest outlaw motorcycle club in the world, behind only the Hells Angels.

The club was involved in the first major outlaw biker conflict in Canadian history, when it engaged the country's second largest club, the Popeyes, from 1974 to 1976. Satan's Choice's power began to diminish during the late 1970s, with some of the club's chapters "patching over" to the Outlaws in 1977. The remaining chapters would eventually become members of the Hells Angels, along with most of the other major outlaw clubs in Ontario, in 2000. In 2017 the club was reactivated briefly but quickly shut down. In 2025 the club was reactivated by Harley Davidson Guindon, son of former President Bernie Guindon.

== History ==
=== Early history ===
The founding chapter of the first iteration of Satan's Choice was established in 1956 in Toronto, usually hanging around Aida's, a downtown restaurant. This version of the club was small in size, only numbering about 45 members, and had a very casual, non-criminal focus at the time. Don Norris, the president of the club, described its activities as "party, party, party". In 1956, Harry Paul Barnes of the Black Diamond Riders started a biker war against Satan's Choice. Barnes said of the biker war: "The first time I invaded their clubhouse I had to. They were invading our property".

The Satan's Choice club led by Don Norris was forced to disband in 1962 following attacks from the rival Black Diamond Riders led by Harry Paul Barnes, who beat them in street fights and humiliated the group by stealing their patches. Barnes invited Satan's Choice bikers to attend a party that was an ambush. Barnes forced Satan's Choice to disband at gunpoint. Barnes told the media at the time: "We took all their crests and told them they couldn't exist any longer. I wiped them out twice, the Choice". Phantom Riders president Bernie Guindon subsequently revived the name and patch of the disbanded club as a way to enrage the Black Diamond Riders. Guindon had sought vengeance on the Black Diamond Riders ever since the 1962 brawl known as the "Battle of Pebblestone", where they defeated the Golden Hawk Riders (with Guindon a member at the time). While this initial club disbanded in 1962, it served as the namesake for a new Satan's Choice, a 1965 alliance of four regional motorcycle clubs: the Phantom Riders of Oshawa, the Canadian Lancers of Scarborough (modern Toronto), the Throttle Twisters of Preston (modern Cambridge), and the Wild Ones of Port Credit (modern Mississauga).

Guindon became the president of this newer, larger version of Satan's Choice, and later their national president as the group expanded. He had promoted the merger of the four clubs to end the attacks of the Black Diamond Riders, arguing if the four clubs were united, it would have such an overwhelming numerical superiority that it would ensure that the Black Diamond Riders would not dare attack them anymore. Guindon respectfully sought and received permission from Norris to use the name and patch of the former Satan's Choice. Norris recalled: "I could hardly contain my enthusiasm. I loaned them my old chest as a sample and told them where they could be made. For aiding in the new beginning, I was presented with a new set of colors". The group regulated itself somewhat differently from most motorcycle clubs such as the Hells Angels, using a series of bylaws instead of a single written constitution or charter.

=== The Alpha Club ===
External videos
- "Satans choice " – by Donald Shebib - National Film Board of Canada - 1966. (27mins)

This new Satan's Choice started out much the same as the original, a group of young men simply wishing to escape from society and its rigid norms and expectations. Satan's Choice members were not serious criminals, if they committed any crimes at all. The newly founded club gained fame in Toronto thanks to the 1965 documentary film Satan's Choice. Charismatic and handsome, Guindon was the "star" of the documentary directed by Donald Shebib. Prior to the 1960s, Toronto had a very staid image of "Toronto the Good", a city whose people were mostly hard-working, conservative God-fearing Protestants of British descent, a bastion of Victorian values that was prosperous, safe and well run, but also rather boring and conventional. A British visitor to Toronto in 1896 stated: "Sunday is as melancholy and suicidal sort of day as Puritan principles can make it". In the 1960s, it was common for young people to Toronto to embrace a "hip" image, choosing ways of life that were quite contrary to the traditional Anglo-Protestant Victorian values that had previously defined Toronto, which were viewed by the young people as conformist, dull and stifling. The outlaw biker subculture came to be seen as a symbol of rebellion and freedom with many of the younger people having a very romantic and idealized image of the bikers, who were admired for their "authenticity". Bikers were viewed as dangerous men who were, however, "cool" and "hip" in their rejection of "Toronto the Good" values. One young woman interviewed in the documentary said she liked riding with Satan's Choice because they were "not phony" and were "real". The Ontario outlaw biker subculture was violent, but in the 1960s the violence was usually limited to brawls and it was most unusual for bikers to kill each other. The unwillingness of outlaw bikers to testify against one another in court following their code made it difficult for the authorities to prosecute them for their frequent street fights, which contributed to their "cool" image as men who successfully broke the law. Shebib said of Satan's Choice in 1965: "It was a lot of booze, broads, and bikes. It wasn't organized crime as it became. But I don't think you wanted to cross them".

In Satan's Choice, Guindon together with the rest of his club professed to reject materialism as they maintained that the only possessions they held dear were their motorcycles. In the documentary, Guindon and the rest of his club claimed to be rejecting what they called the mindless conformity of Canadian society. That Guindon and his followers were rigidly conforming to the code of outlaw biker subculture that originated in California in the late 1940s apparently escaped them. Shebib's documentary, with its sympathetic picture of Satan's Choice as "rebels" against "Toronto the Good" values, gave them an immense amount of publicity in 1960s Toronto. Through the values of outlaw biker subculture that celebrated violence, macho masculinity and the acquisition of wealth contrasted with the counterculture values of the hippies, the two subcultures saw themselves as fellow outcasts from Canadian society, and hippies tended to glamorize outlaw bikers as the 1960s progressed.

Although Guindon and his gang were often into trouble with the law owing to their frequent brawling with other outlaw bikers, in general Satan's Choice were not involved in organized crime in its early years, engaging only in petty crime. One of the first reports in the media about Satan's Choice was a story in the Toronto Star on 29 August 1966, reporting "Five arrested in motorcycle rumble". The report stated: "A policeman had a guitar smashed over his head during a brawl in a local hotel cocktail lounge Saturday after two motorcycle clubs ganged up on a musician. Police say about 12 members of the Golden Hawk Riders and Satan's Choice were out to get even with a musician after he fought with a Golden Hawk Friday and kicked over his motorcycle". Reports such as this were typical of the media reports about Satan's Choice in the 1960s, which rarely mentioned serious crimes. Police raids in the 1960s discovered that Satan's Choice members possessed guns, brass knuckles and marijuana, the latter which were as much for their own use as to sell. One policeman stated about Satan's Choice in the 1960s: "They were rough guys, for sure. But they weren't gangsters; we'd pick them up for little things-simple assault, vandalism, trespassing, public drunkenness, that sort of thing". By contrast, Sergeant John Harris of the Hamilton police believed that Satan's Choice were always involved in organized crime, saying: "Guindon had a right-hand man named Arnold Kelly, who was never a member, never wanted to be. He made his money in construction and owned a resort north of Orillia... But he arranged everything – drug deals, beatings, shootings – he was probably more dangerous than Guindon himself".

In 1967, a black outlaw biker from Montreal, Rod MacLeod, arrived at a biker's convention at Wasaga Beach to meet Guindon. MacLeod wanted to form the first Satan's Choice chapter in la belle province. Guindon approved the request, making MacLeod the first black chapter president anywhere in Canada, leading in Montreal a multiracial, multilingual chapter made of blacks and whites, English-Canadians and French-Canadians of about 20 members. Outlaw biker clubs tended to shun non-white applicants, and Guindon was highly unusual in allowing a black man to lead a chapter. Members tended to leave as quickly as they arrived as Guindon recalled: "In a year or two you'd lost at least a hundred members. They'd come and go so fast". Oshawa, as the first chapter, held the pride of place as Guindon stated: "The Oshawa chapter always stood proud. We'd fight anybody and ride to the fight". Lorne Campbell, a founding member of Satan's Choice and one of Guindon's principal lieutenants remembered: "There wasn't machine guns or knives back then, but there were pretty serious fights".

Guindon recruited a university drop-out turned chef, Howard Doyle Berry, aka "Pigpen", of Peterborough into Satan's Choice, who became his principal lieutenant. To compensate for his solidly respectable middle-class background, the former Classics student Berry embraced a slovenly, disheveled look and purposely led a life of poor hygiene, hence the unflattering moniker "Pigpen". Berry liked to offend and disgust people via such antics such as vomiting over new members; attaching the remains of a dead skunk he found on the road to his Satan's Choice jacket; and bringing and eating his own feces when invited to dine with other Choice members. At a cottage near Coboconk, Berry served to initiate new members by dumping outhouse buckets over their heads while also vomiting over them. Through Guindon found Berry repulsive, his willingness to do anything made him useful and he came to serve as his principal enforcer. Cecil Kirby stated about Berry: "There are guys who would start fights and then they'd say 'Come and help me'. I can't stand people like that. Be a stand-up guy. He was a stand-up guy. That's what I liked about him". Berry once fought Howard "Baldy" Chard, the chief enforcer for the gangster Johnny Papalia, which added to his legend. One teenage recruit to Satan's Choice, Gary "Nutty" Comeau, attended a Satan's Choice party at the Blue Bird Inn in Richmond Hill full of bikers dancing with numerous women, many of whom were topless, to rock music while alcohol and marijuana were served free in plentiful amounts. Comeau, a product of conservative education in Catholic schools, described the party as like nothing he had seen before as it was like a scene out of "Sodom an Gomorrah" and decided on the spot to commit to Satan's Choice as it represented "freedom".

On 25 September 1967, Guindon held the first national convention of Satan's Choice at a farmhouse in Markham Township just outside of Toronto, which was also attended by the Vagabonds club. Attending the convention were the members from the chapters from Oshawa, Ottawa, Guelph, St. Catharines, Windsor, Montreal, Preston, Kingston, Peterborough, and Hamilton. Amid much riotous drinking in a barn where the convention was being held, 23 police officers raided the barn about midnight, but came under a shower of empty beer bottles, forcing them to retreat. The police had not left behind any men to guard their cars which were parked outside of the barn, and as a result, while the police were being showered with bottles, some of the bikers had trashed the parked police cruisers, ripped out the radios and punctured their tires, forcing the policemen to walk back to the station. At about 4:00 am, the enraged police returned with a greater force of 84 officers who engaged in a fierce brawl with the bikers. On their second attempt, the police had plastic shields that allowed them to advance on the barn despite the shower of empty beer bottles being thrown at them. The police arrested 55 bikers plus 9 women who also attending the party. The police smashed up the motorcycles of the bikers in retaliation for the damage done to their cruisers. Journalists who saw the scene the next morning described it as looking like a war zone. The incident at the barn in Markham attracted much media attention, as did the fact that the police seized at the barn a mixture of weapons such as sawed-off shotguns, handguns, axes and bike chains together with an immense quantity of alcohol and marijuana. Arrested together with Guindon at the barn were his second wife Barbara Ann and his right-hand man Howard Berry.

On Sunday morning as those arrested were taken into the Don Jail, there were a number of journalists from the local television stations present and the bikers blew kisses to the cameras. On Monday after the Saturday night raid, the arrested bikers were taken to a courthouse, which became the most popular "tourist attraction" in Toronto that day as one journalist from The Globe and Mail newspaper described it with a large crowd waiting outside the courthouse, many of whom were high school students who were there to cheer on the bikers as they were marched into the courthouse to be fined. In the end, the judge fined Satan's Choice a thousand dollars, most of it in the form of $10 fines for each individual for being present in a place where alcohol was being illegally served plus $3.50 fine for court costs. The Markham incident was not considered a triumph for the forces of law and order with public opinion on the side of the bikers, who were felt to be victims of excessive force. By the end of the 1960s, Guindon had emerged as something of a folk hero in Toronto while Satan's Choice had become the best known and largest outlaw biker club in Canada. In 1969, Satan's Choice reached its peak strength of 400 members as the club grew rapidly in the 1960s. By this point, Satan's Choice had chapters in Toronto, Oshawa, Preston (modern Cambridge), Hamilton, Windsor, Ottawa, Kingston, Guelph, St. Catharines, Peterborough, Vancouver, and Montreal. Guindon was forced to disband the Vancouver chapter after drug use of its members became too excessive even for him. For a time in the late 1960s, Satan's Choice was the closest thing Canada had to a national outlaw biker club with chapters in British Columbia, Ontario and Quebec, which caused the club to have the most media attention by far. In 1968, the Hells Angels national president Sonny Barger sent a delegate to Toronto to ask Guindon to join the Hells Angels, a request that was refused.

On 15 May 1969, Guindon was convicted of rape and during his time in prison, which lasted on and off until 1974 as Guindon kept being sent back to prison for violating his parole, the acting national president was Garnet "Mother" McEwen. In October 1969, during a field day in Hamilton, every Satan's Choice member took part as a demonstration of power against the rival Wild Ones club. As all 400 members rode in, the Wild Ones were so intimidated that they abandoned the field.

=== Criminalization ===
Towards the end of the 1960s and into the 1970s, Satan's Choice slowly developed into an organized crime group as a result of the large potential profits from criminal activities. While they were involved in a number of criminal activities that were typical for biker gangs, such as robbery, theft, assault, and running prostitution rings, they were notably deeply involved in drug production and trafficking. The club operated a number of drug labs out of remote cabins in northern Ontario, with production focusing especially on PCP and methamphetamines, better known in the area as "Canadian Blue". The remoteness of northern Ontario made it possible to hide drug labs and to manufacture drugs on a scale that was difficult in the more populous region of southern Ontario. This success emboldened elements of Satan's Choice, in particular their Toronto chapter, into sparking a gang war with two rival biker gangs in the city, the Black Diamond Riders MC and the Vagabonds MC. However, the rest of the group's chapters met and ended the war, making peace with the two rival groups and disciplining the leaders of the Toronto chapter. During this time period, Satan's Choice had grown rapidly, reaching a peak strength of more than 400 by 1970. Despite crackdowns by authorities, the club still maintained a membership of over 350 in 1977, across thirteen chapters in Ontario and Quebec. At this point, Satan's Choice still maintained the position of the second largest motorcycle club in the world behind only the Hells Angels.

The Canadian scholar Graeme Melcher wrote: "In a culture where violence, toughness, and assertive masculinity were so highly prized, Guindon succeeded as a leader because he was tougher and smarter than the next guy". Although Satan's Choice, together other Canadian outlaw biker clubs, slavishly copied the American outlaw biker clubs, Guindon was adamantly against allowing American clubs to come to Canada, arguing the American-based clubs would destabilize the biker scene and cause too much violence. Guindon saw violence as a legitimate way to achieve his aims, in general, but he was against biker wars, arguing that the Canadian public was willing to accept street fights, but not murder, and that excessive violence would lead to a police crackdown. Guindon argued the outlaw biker clubs should respect each other's territories and avoid violence. Melcher wrote there was an element of self-interest to Guindon's strategy since Satan's Choice was the largest club and his strategy for peace by mutual respect for each other's territories enshrined the dominance of his club by preventing challenges into his territories. Melcher further noted that as a business strategy, Guindon's peace strategy was quite rational as the lack of a police crackdown allowed Satan's Choice to make greater profits than would be the case if the police were cracking down. In 1973, Guindon was approached by the Hells Angels for the first time with the offer to have Satan's Choice "patch over" to become Hells Angels. Guindon was an ardent Canadian nationalist and rejected the offer, saying he did not want his club absorbed into an American club.

In October 1970, a number of Satan's Choice members from the Toronto and Oshawa chapters served as extras in a low-budget exploitation film The Proud Rider starring Arthur Hindle about a thinly disguised version of Satan's Choice. The decision to use Satan's Choice members in the film had been approved by "Big" Jack Olliffe, who had replaced McEwen as the interim president. The first day of filming, 3 October 1970, was highly chaotic owing to unruly behavior of the bikers who refused to take direction, and matters continued to decline thereafter. Olliffe and the others took advantage that the film's producers were paying for the meals of the extras to gourmandise extravagantly as Olliffe alone devoured six hamburgers per meal. The gourmadising inflated the film's production costs by $2, 000 dollars per day, which ensured that The Proud Rider was doomed to lose money at the box office owing to its bloated production costs. When a group of bikers dropped their pants and underwear with the aim of shocking a script girl, "Pigpen" Berry felt overshadowed, which inspired him to bite off the head of a live snake to shock her even more. Throughout the film's production, Berry was out of control as he engaged in bizarre antics designed to disgust and appall. The scriptwriter and assistant director, Chester Stocki, told a journalist, Paul King, that he felt "scared, scared, scared. Just look at them!"

As the group moved from a motorcycle club into organized crime, many of the original members dropped out. It was estimated that about 90% of the violence in the 1970s was related to the control of the drug trade. Guindon later stated: "Drugs were the ruin of many a good club member and many a good club". Ken Rae, the Crown Attorney (prosecutor) in Kitchener stated in 1977: "At one time Kitchener had all the (Satan’s) Choice in jail. When they got out in 1971, they decided that running around alleys with shotguns wasn’t profitable so they reorganized and got into more profitable things like drugs." The stories about Satan's Choice started to change from that of a hedonist types who liked to party hard to darker stories such as the case of a Kitchener man beaten to death in a back ally brawl and that of a Markham woman who tried to break up with her Choice boyfriend, only to be found lying semi-conscious and naked outside with serious vaginal bleeding caused by rape. Satan's Choice members were the suspects in the murder of a Vancouver businessman, believed to have been a case of murder for hire.

Former Satan's Choice member Cecil Kirby wrote in his 1986 memoirs Mafia Enforcer that Satan's Choice members specialized in seducing the female clerks who operated the Ontario Provincial Police's computers and were always willing to share information from the computers with their boyfriends. Kirby stated that there was one clerk who had access to the most classified information and:

"Club members carried her number in their wallets. If a member was worried about the cops, all he had to do was call her number, and she'd access the police computer to see if there were any warrants on him. When we spotted a rival gang member, we'd also use her to see if there were any outstanding fugitive warrants on him. If there were, we'd have someone in the club call up the cops and tip them off where that rival was and who was with him. It was a good way of avoiding trouble and getting rid of rival gang members. We could also check out anybody's criminal record through that computer. This helped us spot people trying to infiltrate us from rival gangs or the cops".

Kirby concluded that Satan's Choice "had the upper hand in Toronto because we had the best intelligence network around. We were able to move on the other gangs faster than they could move on us because we had such good sources and good information on the habits of the other gangs".

In 1973, the Ontario government decided to put all the outlaw biker clubs out of business, and had the Intelligence Branch of the Ontario Provincial Police (OPP) set up a Special Squad with the unfortunate acronym of the SS dedicated entirely to pursuing outlaw bikers. The Special Squad was later renamed the Anti-Biker Unit. Unlike other organized groups such as the Mafia, the outlaw biker subculture was perceived by public by 1973 as especially dangerous. It was understood by members of the Special Squad that "legal niceties" need not be upheld as the politicians demanded convictions to show the public that action was being taken. Corporal Terry Hall of the Special Squad called the campaign against Satan's Choice "reverse intimidation" as the Special Squad sought to intimidate bikers via the same means used by the bikers themselves. The American journalist Mick Lowe wrote that, starting in 1973, Hall "had inhabited a strange nether region on the fringes of Canadian law enforcement" as he went after bikers via very ruthless and often illegal means, making him into a "black legend among Canadian bikers" who feared him as a policeman who did not follow the law. Even Hall's appearance with his long hair and beard and a generally disheveled look made him appear more like an outlaw biker than a policeman.

One consequence of the "reverse intimidation" campaign was to reduce Satan's Choice membership from the all-time high of about 400 members in 1969 to about 110 in 1977. An additional and unintended result of "reverse intimidation" campaign was to drive out the genuine motorcycle enthusiasts out of Satan's Choice while leaving behind only those committed to organized crime who were willing to accept imprisonment from time to time as a consequence of their lifestyle. The campaign waged by Hall and other Special Squad members failed in its purpose as the number of outlaw bikers in Ontario went from about 500 in 1973 to about 800 in 1978 as the profits from organized crime led more men to join outlaw biker clubs. As part of the campaign against Satan's Choice, Hall orchestrated a media campaign, leaking information to journalists that portrayed Satan's Choice as public enemy number one, sparking a moral panic against the club.

=== Alliance with the Outlaws ===
In 1975, Satan's Choice began an alliance with the Outlaws Motorcycle Club, one of the largest international outlaw biker clubs. In 1974, Kirby and Garnet "Mother" McEwen, the president of the St. Catharines chapter, went to Fort Lauderdale, Florida to meet Outlaw leaders. McEwen became especially close to the Outlaws and was the most vocal advocate within Satan's Choice of closer ties with them. In June 1975, Guindon forged an alliance with the Outlaws club, which is very active in the American Midwest. Under the terms of the agreement, the Outlaws were the exclusive distributors in the United States of the PCPs and methamphetamine manufactured by Choice members in northern Ontario. The "Canadian Blue" methamphetamine produced in Ontario sold for $8,000 Canadian dollars per pound, but in the United States it was sold for $12,000 U.S. dollars per pound. As manufacturing methamphetamine produces a very unpleasant smell that is usually compared to the smell of cat urine, northern Ontario with its sparse population, numerous lakes and vast forests was ideal for manufacturing methamphetamine. The Outlaws who controlled the markets of the Midwest came to be dependent upon methamphetamine manufactured by Satan's Choice.

The benefits of such a relationship worked to the advantage of both groups. Satan's Choice gained access to a larger support network of clubs throughout the United States and beyond, opening the club to new business opportunities and possibly even reinforcements in the event of another club war. Meanwhile, the Outlaws gained a strong ally in Ontario, precluding any expansion by the Hells Angels into the region. Furthermore, the Outlaws gained a way to challenge the supremacy of the Hells Angels in Quebec through access to the Montreal chapter of Satan's Choice. This led the Montreal chapter and their Outlaw allies into open conflict with the Hells Angels-backed Popeyes, resulting in a number of casualties on both sides. The Popeyes had targeted the Devil's Disciples biker gang, who were allies of Satan's Choice. The Devils' Disciples and the Montreal chapter of Satan's Choice were engaged in the manufacturing and smuggling of chemical drugs, a market that the Popeyes decided to violently enter in 1974, leading to the biker war. Kirby was present when "Pigpen" Berry opened fire on the clubhouse of the Popeyes with a sawed-off Lee–Enfield .303 rifle with a ten-round clip, saying "It was like a cannon going off". Kirby recalled in a 2015 interview: "If there was trouble anywhere, they'd sent Howard Berry out to take care of it. He was the Choice hitman and everybody knew it". In an interview, Berry stated that he was hired to kill people, but never actually succeeded in doing so. The same underworld struggle drew in the Irish West End Gang on the side of Satan's Choice while the Dubois Brothers gang backed the Popeyes. The Popeyes, who acted as "muscle" for the Dubois brothers, killed 15 members of the Devil's Disciples between 1974 and 1976, causing the latter gang to disband themselves in January 1976. Yves Trudeau, the ace assassin for the Popeyes, first rose to prominence during this struggle.

Reflecting the new alliance, Berry started to work for the Outlaws in Florida, where his willingness to perform any task together with his anonymity made him useful as an enforcer. In the 1970s, the San Francisco-based Hells Angels were seeking to expand from California into Florida, leading to a biker war with the Chicago-based Outlaws. The conflict had started in 1969 when an Outlaw raped the wife of a Hells Angel, leading to the Angels beating the rapist to death. During his time as an Outlaw enforcer and hitman in Florida, Berry customarily rode around in his motorcycle with a machine gun strapped to the front, as much for his own protection as for intimidation. During an assassination attempt by the Hells Angels, Berry took two bullets to the chest. Berry was living under the assumed name Tim Jones, and the Florida police did not realize that Berry was living illegally in the United States. Berry reported to Guindon that many of the Outlaws were Vietnam veterans who were full of rage and hatred who engaged in pointless, irrational violence. The fact that many of the Hells Angels and the Outlaws were veterans who used the combat skills they had learned during the Vietnam War against each other added to the intensity of the conflict as Berry stated: "Down here they played the game for keeps". However, Berry also told Guindon about the Outlaws: "They're well organized. They make money big time".

In August 1975, Guindon went to a hunting lodge at Oba Lake in northern Ontario owned by Alain Templain, the president of the Oshawa chapter of Satan' Choice. The lodge was so remote as to be only accessible by plane. Also at the lodge were a group of undercover detectives from the OPP posing as American tourists looking for a "good time" in Canada. On 6 August 1975, the undercover officers raided a shack located on an island in Oba Lake and found Guindon and Templain with some PCP tablets worth $6 million Canadian dollars together with PCP-manufacturing equipment. Found on the island on Oba Lake were 9 pounds of PCP ready to sell and 236 pounds of PCP waiting to be completed. The drug network for selling the PCP ranged as far as Florida, and the police estimated Guindon was making at least $60 million per month in sales. Unknown to Guindon, it was McEwen who tipped off the police about the PCP factory at Oba Lake and told them when Guindon would be visiting so they could arrest him. McEwen wanted Guindon out of the way in order to pursue his plans for "Yankeeization". Lowe described McEwen as suffering from "...the classic Canadian-American love-hate relationship, a distinctly Canadian malady, since Americans never thought enough about Canada to either love or hate their northern cousins one way or the other". McEwen believed that he would not be a truly important person in the biker scene until he had become a member of an American outlaw biker club.

Fugitives from both the Outlaws and Satan's Choice were found to be in hiding in each other's nations. Berry, wanted for attempted murder in Peterborough, was arrested in North Carolina in December 1975 with a forged Florida driver's license giving his name as Tim Jones. Berry was arrested after he was caught trying to steal a tank from a U.S. Army base. He was not extradited to Canada as he was instead convicted in North Carolina for his involvement in an Outlaw auto theft ring. After completing his sentence, Berry was deported to Canada. James "Blue" Starrett of the Outlaws was found to be living in St. Catharine's on 22 July 1976 under the name Charlie Brown, where he ran a painting business and was a member of the local Satan's Choice chapter. Starrett had been serving a life sentence for murdering a woman in Florida in 1970 and had escaped from prison in 1974, leading to his fellow Outlaws arranging for him to go to Canada. William "Gatemouth" Edson of the Outlaw chapter in Fort Lauderdale, Florida had been convicted of multiple offenses such as murdering three Hells Angels; torturing a woman for two days because she wore a jacket with an Outlaw patch without permission; and almost beating another woman to death because she was the girlfriend of a Bandidos Motorcycle Club member. Like Starrett, Edson had escaped from prison in Florida and with the help of his fellow Outlaws had made his way to Canada, where he settled in Kitchener. In Kitchener, Edson was given the false name Denis Lupo, together with a fake Ontario driver's license, and he joined the local Satan's Choice chapter. Edson was arrested in Kitchener on 27 August 1976 and deported to the United States. At times, the fugitive hiding program caused tensions. One Outlaw biker from Nashville arranged for his girlfriend to hide out with the Satan's Choice's chapter in Kitchener, during which time she had a sexual relationship with Lorne Campbell of the Choice's Oshawa chapter, which almost caused a brawl between the two men when the biker from Tennessee travelled north to reclaim his girlfriend.

In May 1976, the club's leader Bernie Guindon was incarcerated on drug charges relating to the Oba Lake drug bust. The man who replaced Guindon as national president, Garnet "Mother" McEwen, was a proponent of "Yankeeization", favoring close ties with the Outlaws unlike the Canadian nationalist Guindon who wanted to keep his club Canadian. The fact that McEwen bugged the automobiles of other Satan's Choice members did not endear him to many who saw him as a "rat". In 1976, McEwen arranged for a common "association patch" between the Outlaws and Satan's Choice, allowing for equality between the two clubs. In 1976, a member of the Hamilton chapter, James "Wench" Kellet, ran for the mayor of Hamilton under the slogan "A Choice in the Right Direction". He won only about 1,000 votes, coming last in the election. Shortly afterwards, Kellet was involved in a shoot-out with the Hamilton police when he opened fire with a shotgun on a police cruiser, leading to the police to return fire and ultimately kill him. One of the first Satan's Choice members to be murdered was John Foote, who was killed on 4 November 1976 by another member, John Harvey. After a disagreement, Foote hit Harvey with a pool cue, resulting in Harvey, who was heavily under the influence of drugs, returning with a gun and shooting him dead. Another internal killing was that of the former acting national president, Jack Olliffe, who was shot dead by another Choice member, Terry Siblock, at the Cadillac Hotel in Oshawa. Olliffe had frequently accused Siblock of being an informer, leading to Siblock to shoot Olliffee dead while he was working as a bouncer in the bar-room of the Cadillac Hotel in order to prove once and for all that he was not an informer.

During McEwen's presidency, in-fighting between the chapters became common and in 1977, McEwen tried to expel the entire Kitchener chapter after some of its members talked too frankly to two journalists from the Kitchener Record. At a party at the clubhouse of the Montreal chapter, Lorne Campbell of the Oshawa chapter was startled to hear David Séguin of the Windsor chapter declare: "If I broke down on the 401, I wouldn't phone anyone from Oshawa. That's how much I hate Oshawa". Campbell responded by assaulting Séguin, who screamed in pain under the blows of Campbell's fists, leading Campbell to mockingly say "Not till I'm finished with you, Dave. This ain't hurting me". McEwen called a secret meeting attended by William "King" O'Reilly, the president of the Windsor chapter; John "Doctor John" Arksey, the president of the Ottawa chapter; and Joseph "Sonny" Lacombe, the president of the Montreal chapter. O'Reilly and Arksey both agreed to McEwen's plans to have Satan's Choice "patch over" to the Outlaws, while Lacombe remained non-committal for a time. In March 1977, McEwen arranged for the Windsor and St. Catharine's chapters to secretly join the Outlaws.

=== "The Big Split" of 1977 ===
Guindon's imprisonment soon led to the fracturing of Satan's Choice when, on 1 July 1977, the Ottawa, St. Catharines, Windsor, London and Montreal chapters fully abandoned Satan's Choice in favour of the much larger Outlaws. McEwen called a secret meeting on 1 July 1977, with most of the chapter presidents being present where he called for "patching over" to the Outlaws, arguing that being members of an American-based club would add to their power, saying that the St. Catharine's and Windsor chapters had already decided to join the Outlaws. The chapter presidents known to be loyal to Guindon were not invited to the meeting. The meeting was not held at the usual meeting place of Wasaga Beach on Georgian Bay, instead held at Crystal Beach on Lake Erie close to the American border. McEwen brought over a number of American Outlaws from their Detroit chapter to provide intimidation at the Crystal Beach meeting. Lowe wrote that the chapters "began to fall like dominoes" as, once Mario Parente of the Hamilton chapter decided to go over to the Outlaws, the Montreal chapter did likewise, which caused the Ottawa chapter to "patch over". To mark the change, a ceremony was performed at Crystal Beach where the Satan's Choice chapter presidents burned their jackets with the Satan's Choice patches while putting on new jackets with the Outlaw patch.

Satan's Choice lost the chapters in Montreal, Hamilton, St. Catharine's, Sault Ste. Marie, Windsor, London, Ottawa, and Kingston to the Outlaws. The "Big Split" as the break-up was known caused much anguish with many Satan's Choice members feeling that it was like a family being divided after a divorce as members either opted to join the Outlaws or remain with Satan's Choice. Lorne Campbell stated: "The split never would have gone down if Bernie was still out. Bernie Guindon's influence was not to be challenged. When he talks about people having parts, he's got all kinds of parts". When Guindon was released early from prison for good behavior in 1984, all Satan's Choice had left were the chapters in Thunder Bay, Kitchener, Oshawa, and Toronto. The way his supposed allies, the Outlaws, poached several chapters away from him while he was in prison caused Guindon to have a lasting grudge against the Outlaws, and during the subsequent struggle between the Hells Angels and the Outlaws, Guindon was to lean in a pro-Angel neutrality. In 1977, Guindon was described in media reports as being furious with McEwen, the man he appointed as interim national president for having engineered the "patch over". Guidnon later recalled: "I couldn't do anything about it. Fuck was I mad. Especially at him [McEwen]. Stool pigeon motherfucker". From within the Millhaven prison, Guindon placed a bounty on McEwen, promising to pay $10,000 as the reward for killing him. Langton wrote: "Effectively powerless behind bars, he [Guindon] issued a $10, 000 reward on McEwen's head. It went uncollected". Guindon spent hours punching his bed in fury as he wished his bed was McEwen. McEwen's house in St. Catharine's was shot up by the Satan's Choice in a failed assassination attempt. In a further insult, McEwen told his police handers about the various safehouses for hiding drugs. In August 1977, the OPP seized 1 million dollars' worth of drugs in various Satan's Choice safehouses in Toronto, Wasaga Beach, Kingston, and Hamilton.

On 5 December 1977, the Popeyes of Montreal "patched over" to become the first Hells Angel chapter in Canada. On 15 February 1978, Trudeau, who was now with the Hells Angels, shot two Outlaws outside of a Montreal bar, killing one of them, Robert Côté. The shooting caused the First Biker War that was to last until 1984. Between 1978 and 1983, the "psychopathic killer" Trudeau killed 18 out of the 23 Outlaws slain in Montreal during the conflict. By 1980, it was estimated that the Angels–Outlaw biker war had caused about 20 murders in Quebec and Ontario since 1978, while between 1981 and 1984 another 42 were killed. The Montreal chapter of Satan's Choice who had "patched over" to join the Outlaws in 1977, believing that this would improve their status within the underworld, had been "virtually exterminated" by the Hells Angels by 1984. One consequence of the biker war was that the Outlaws did not wish to take on Satan's Choice, which enjoyed a respite despite its weakened status. The possibility of Satan's Choice "patching over" to join the Hells Angels ensured that though the Outlaws–Satan's Choice relationship was tense and always difficult, the Outlaws never wanted to apply too much pressure against the Choice least they join the Hells Angels. In the summer of 1978, at a general meeting, Satan's Choice debated about whatever to move into selling heroin.

The only consolation for Guindon was that McEwen as the first national president of the Canadian Outlaws proved to be a total failure as the American Outlaws expelled him after he was caught embezzling some $30,000 he was supposed to pay to them. Fearing he might be killed if he stayed in Ontario, McEwen fled to Alberta where he ended up working as a dishwasher at a restaurant located in a Calgary hotel. McEwen joined the Chosen Few biker gang and was again caught stealing, causing the other members of the Chosen Few to be almost beat him to death with his artificial leg. In 1980, McEwen abandoned biking to become a dishwasher, which was felt to be sufficient punishment by Satan's Choice.

=== The Port Hope 8 case ===
The Golden Hawk Riders of Port Hope were a small club of seven members, and were considering "patching over" to join the Outlaws. In the aftermath of the split of 1977, relations between the Outlaws and Satan's Choice were very unfriendly. Several members of Satan' Choice warned the Golden Hawk Riders, including their sergeant-at-arms, Bill "Heavy" Matiyek, who had a reputation as a hothead, not to go through with the planned "patch over", a demand that Matiyek rejected. Port Hope is a small town close to Oshawa, and an Outlaw chapter in Port Hope would threaten the profits from the drug trade enjoyed by the Satan's Choice Oshawa chapter. With Port Hope less than a half an hour away by automobile from Oshawa, an Outlaw chapter in Port Hope would effectively be the same as an Outlaw chapter in Oshawa.

A member of the Satan's Choice Peterborough chapter, Richard Sauvé, took the a phone call and received the message that Matiyek was drinking with two Outlaws, Fred Jones and Sonny Bronson, at the Queen's Hotel and wanted to see an officer of the Peterborough chapter that night. Sauvé asked for help from the Toronto chapter in order to face Matiyek who had a reputation for being violent. The members from Toronto who went to Port Hope that night were Garry "Nutty" Comeau, Jeff McLeod, Larry Hurren, Lorne Campbell and Armand Sanguigni. A confrontation, with Golden Hawk Rider Matiyek and the two Outlaws on one side and the Satan's Choice members on the other, began in the bar-room soon after. Matiyek, who was drunk and high on marijuana and amphetamines, was talking about shooting the Satan's Choice members in the Queen's Hotel bar-room, causing Lorne Campbell of the Choice's Toronto chapter to come to their aid. Campbell had heard that Matiyek had a gun and he brought along a gun to the Queen's Hotel. The confrontation in the bar-room ended with guns being drawn and Campbell shooting and killing Matiyek at about 10:55 pm.

Much of the police investigation was slapdash with the detectives taking no fingerprints from the crime scene while interviewing the witnesses as a group instead of individually. Subsequently, four Choice members were charged with Matiyek's murder, but not Campbell. Corporal Terry Hall of the OPP's Special Squad, who took charge of the investigation on 27 October 1978, seems to have decided to use Matiyek's death as a chance to cripple Satan's Choice by convicting as many bikers as possible of his murder. Hall's investigative methods were heterodox and contrary to accepted standards, but what mattered to him was providing the evidence to convict as many Satan's Choice bikers as possible. Ultimately, eight members of Satan's Choice were charged with the murder. People in Port Hope were so outraged by Matiyek's murder that it was deemed impossible to find an impartial jury in that town, so the trial was held in London, Ontario. The Crown Attorney at the trial, Chris Meinhardt, presented the case as a first-degree murder, calling it "a foul, horrible, planned execution." During the trial, Campbell testified that he had killed Matiyek and the eight accused were innocent. The journalist Jerry Langton wrote that the trial was "comical" as some of the witnesses for the Crown "changed their testimony three or even four times... Much of the Crown's evidence contradicted itself".

The conviction of six of the eight accused of Matiyek's murder despite Campbell's testimony on the witness stand that he had killed him was highly controversial in 1979 and remains so. At the time, a journalist wrote "Who actually fired the gun was never established..." at the trial. Comeau and Sauvé were convicted of first-degree murder while the other four were convicted of second-degree murder. Two of the accused, Armand Sanguigni and Gordon van Haarlem, were acquitted. Two of the convicted, Sauvé and Blaker, came from the Choice's Peterborough chapter. At the same time, another four members of the Choice's Peterborough chapter were also convicted of separate charges relating to a gang-rape. The Peterborough chapter, which was already the weakest chapter, was effectively destroyed as a result of losing six members to the prisons, being reduced down to a shadowy existence. The Queen's Hotel was renamed the Walton Hotel to avoid the associations with the murder.

The Port Hope case became the subject of a best-selling 1988 book, Conspiracy of Brothers by the American journalist Mick Lowe, and the 1990 protest song "Justice in Ontario" by the American singer Steve Earle. The "Port Hope 8" case became a cause célèbre in the 1980s–1990s, attracting even international attention. Lowe charged that there was a police conspiracy to frame the accused, noting that exculpatory evidence, such as Comeau's jacket that would have supported his story that he had been shot, mysteriously disappeared after the police seized it. In 1988, the Oshawa chapter president Campbell served as a guest lecturer at the University of Ottawa law school class, where he spoke about the Port Hope case as a miscarriage of justice, becoming the first and only Satan's Choice chapter president to ever give a university lecture.

=== The Beta Club ===
Although Satan's Choice was not as powerful as it once been before 1977, the club was described as still having a "cocky attitude" in the 1980s and 1990s, being the second most powerful club in Ontario after the Outlaws. In 1981, Satan's Choice made an alliance with the Lobos and the Chosen Few gangs to improve their bargaining power against their rivals, the Outlaws. In October 1982, the Toronto clubhouse was burned down in a case of arson.

In 1983, a Satan's Choice-turned-Outlaw, David Eugene Séquin, stormed into the clubhouse of the Chosen Few in Emeryville, where he killed three people and wounded three more. Séquin fled to the United States and was killed in a shoot-out in Illinois in July 1985. On 8 September 1983, Guy "Frenchie" Gilbert of Satan's Choice Kitchener chapter was having lunch at Le Petit Bourg restaurant in Longueuil, Quebec with Yves Buteau, the national president of the Hells Angels, to discuss "patching over" to join the Hells Angels. As Gilbert, Buteau and another Hells Angel, René Lamoureaux, were leaving the restaurant, they were ambushed in the parking lot by an Outlaw, Gino Goudreau, who gunned down all three men. Lamoureaux was badly wounded, but survived while Buteau and Gilbert were both killed. Gilbert's murder put a temporary end to the efforts of the Kitchener chapter to join the Hells Angels.

A series of police raids in 1983 in Madoc discovered a methamphetamine factory operated jointly by Satan's Choice and the Para-Dice Riders that produced about $3.6 million worth of methamphetamine per month. Another set of raids in 1984 seized two small-caliber handguns, marijuana and marijuana oil, and a small amount of cocaine from four private residences in Scarborough. In 1984, a Satan's Choice member was killed in Kitchener while riding his motorcycle by a gunman in a car that drove up next to him. On 19 November 1984, Guindon was released on parole for good behavior and despite his parole conditions, resumed his association with his club. Guindon went to Windsor to beat up Bill Hulko, the former president of the Choice Windsor chapter who had gone over to the Outlaws in 1977. Putting his boxing skills to good use, Guindon recalled: "I soaked him right in the fucking head... He did nothing... I just wanted to see where his balls were. He didn't have his balls that fucking day". Between 1985 and 1988, Guindon opened up four new chapters in Ontario, adding about 95 new members. By the 1980s, Satan's Choice had moved into selling cocaine, and a pipeline was opened to move cocaine from Toronto to Alberta, where many oil workers used cocaine to ease the tedium of their jobs. In 1985, a second version of Satan's Choice Hamilton chapter opened up on St. Matthew's Avenue which was very close to the Outlaws' Hamilton clubhouse at 402 Birch Avenue. In August 1985, a biker war in Hamilton led to the murder of two Satan's Choice members, Allan Kinloch and Brent Roddick; an Outlaw, James Lewis; and a member of the Red Devils, Michael Carey. When Roddick's body was found on 25 August 1985, it was the fourth murder of a biker in Hamilton that month. The day after Roddick's murder, Satan's Choice disbanded their Hamilton chapter with its members relocating to the Kitchener chapter. In 1986, the Nanaimo chapter of the Hells Angels put on an "Angels Acres" party on Vancouver Island that was attended by 2,500 people. A number of bikers from Satan's Choice together with the Para-Dice Riders, and the Vagabonds from Ontario; the Rebels from Alberta and Saskatchewan; the Vikings from Quebec City; and the Grim Reapers from Alberta attended the party, which reflected the growth of Hells Angels influence.

Starting in 1981, Kevin Roy Hawkins worked as an anti-biker police detective in Kitchener who spent much time pursuing the Kitchener chapter of Satan's Choice. Hawkins saw a stripper named Cherie Graham perform at the Breslau Hotel in Breslau in March 1984 and fell in love with her, abandoning his wife later that spring to move in with Graham. Through Graham, Hawkins got to know the president of her stripper agency, Claude "Gootch" Morin, who was also the president of Satan's Choice's Kitchener chapter. As Hawkins was deeply in debt owing to the costs associated with his divorce, the police allege that he began to sell information to Morin. Morin is alleged to have paid him $5,000 in cash at their first meeting and promised another $10,000 in cash if his information proved to be useful. The police allege that Hawkins told Morin about a police raid planned in Hamilton and based on the information he is said to have provided, Morin was able to deduce the identity of the informer, whom he promptly had killed. Detective John Harris of the Hamilton police stated about the murder: "At first we thought it was a drug deal gone bad. But when Hawkins went down, we were all more careful about what we said".

In March 1987, Graham contacted the police, alleging that Hawkins was physically abusive and was involved with Satan' Choice. Hawkins and Morin were charged with corruption and obstruction of justice on 29 January 1988, and at Hawkins's preliminary inquiry on 7–8 September 1988, Graham testified against him. However, Hawkins then married Graham on 31 March 1989, and at subsequent preliminary inquiry hearings she claimed she had committed perjury at the instigation of the detectives and Crown Attorneys at the first preliminary inquiry hearings in 1988. Over the following years, the Crown sought to use Graham's initial 1988 statements as evidence for the trial while the lawyers for Hawkins and Morin sought to exclude these statements as evidence. The case reached the Supreme Court in 1996, which ruled these statements could be used as evidence. In 1997, the charges against Hawkins and Morin were withdrawn by the Crown following the revelation that the OPP detective investigating Hawkins and Morin had been in a sexual relationship with Graham at the time, a relationship the prosecutors were aware of, but failed to disclose to the defense lawyers representing Hawkins and Morin. On 18 January 2010, Hawkins won the right to sue the two Crown Attorneys at his trial, Brian Trafford and William Wolski, alleging malicious prosecution. The case was chronicled in the 1998 book The Biker, the Stripper and the Cop by Eugene McCarthy.

The Kitchener chapter was generally considered to be the strongest Satan's Choice chapter that had a firm arm-lock on organized crime in the "Tri Cities" of Cambridge, Kitchener and Waterloo from the early 1970s onward. The "Tri Cities" were a wealthy area, and unlike in Toronto, the Satan's Choice chapter had a monopoly on organized crime in the Waterloo region. In 1985, the Kitchener chapter recruited Brian Beaucage, one of the leaders of the prison riot at the Kingston Penitentiary of 14–18 April 1971. Beaucage was known for his violent hatred of the Outlaws, once travelling to London to try to pull off the sign of the Outlaws' London clubhouse, causing the Outlaws to shoot him. He was wearing a bulletproof vest and survived. On 16 January 1987, Beaucage during a visit to London was shot by an Outlaw with .45 caliber handgun, taking a bullet to the heart, but again survived the shooting. He was known for his aggressive and confrontational personality, which led him to being transferred over to the Oshawa chapter after he was involved in quarrels with almost every member of the Kitchener chapter. In December 1986, the Kitchener chapter ran a full-page Christmas advertisement in the Kitchener Record reading: "Satan's Choice Motorcycle Club would like to take this opportunity to wish everyone in the Waterloo Region a very Merry Christmas and let you know that we are still here and will always be here. Choice Forever Forever Choice!" In December 1987, after complaints from readers, the Kitchener Record ceased running what was intended to be an annual ad.

In the summer of 1989, a group of Satan's Choice bikers led by Guindon and Campbell visited the Prairie provinces, meeting with the leaders of los Bravos gang of Winnipeg and the Grim Reapers in Calgary and Lethbridge to form alliances. A report by the police Organized Crime Committee from 1989 stated that Satan's Choice, the Vagabonds and the Lobos were working closely to manufacture and distribute methamphetamine. Although the media often described Satan's Choice as public enemy one, Campbell disagreed, arguing that the low intelligence of most Satan's Choice members led them to engage in asinine antics that made it very easy for the police to arrest them. Campbell gave as an example one member who, in August 1989, hid an M1 assault rifle in the branches of a tree in the backyard of the Oshawa clubhouse. In October 1989, when the leaves were falling, a policeman arrested the member for the possession of a banned weapon. The arrested member expressed much bafflement that a policeman was able to find the assault rifle, leading Campbell to tell him that "He just looked up", which astonished the man. By late 1989, both Guindon and Campbell were growing dissatisfied with the low quality of incoming recruits into Satan's Choice, feeling that the new members were of abysmally low intelligence and were too "soft". The feud with the Outlaws led Guindon and his deputy Campbell to look with approval upon the Hells Angels who had driven the Outlaws out of Quebec with much ruthlessness. Furthermore, the style of the Hells Angels were much to the taste of both Guindon and Campbell, who admired the type of men that the Hells Angels attracted. In the winter of 1990, a group of senior Satan's Choice members led by Guindon and Campbell visited the Hells Angels' clubhouse in Sorel to seek an alliance with the Angels against the Outlaws. Campbell recalled about the visit: "They listened to us. Even though they had a reputation for being dangerous, there was no confrontation. There was no pulling heavies. They were perfect gentlemen". Although no promises were given about joining the Angels, it was made clear that the Angels wanted an alliance.

Rival gangs would also begin to target the club. Brian Beaucage spent the night of 3 March 1991 devoted to drinking, hard drugs and watching pornography in a Toronto rooming house. On the same night, he was beheaded in his bed by a member of the Loners gang, Frank Passarelli, with his body not found until the next day, being partially devoured by the dogs belonging to another boarder. At the time, the police expressed no surprise about Beaucage's murder, saying he was a violent and disagreeable man, and the only surprise was that it took this long for somebody to saw off his head with a kitchen knife. The gruesome nature of Beaucage's murder led it to take on a legendary reputation within biker circles, being known inaccurately as the "Fifty Whacks with an Ax".

In the summer, the feud was resumed with the Black Diamond Riders who were attempt to set up a chapter in Sudbury. Upon hearing that Barnes and the Black Diamond Riders had beaten up a Satan's Choice biker in Sudbury and stolen his "colors", Guindon personally led a force of Satan's Choice bikers north to Sudbury to avenge the insult. On 5 September 1992 in Sudbury, the Satan's Choice bikers were involved in a brawl with the Black Diamond Riders in a motel parking lot that put eight of the Riders into the hospital. The brawl in Sudbury came to be known in biker circles as the "Sudbury Saturday Night" and has a legendary reputation. In the "Sudbury Saturday Night" brawl, Guindon led 45 Satan's Choice bikers armed with baseball bats, knives, wooden boards and guns against 8 Black Diamond Riders led by Barnes and mercilessly beat them. In addition, Barnes and another Black Diamond Rider were shot.

Campbell, after his release from prison in March 1993, recalled that Satan's Choice was "making money hand over fist". Campbell together with three others members of the Oshawa chapter served as the security for cigarette smugglers on the Akwesasne St. Regis Mohawk Reservation that spanned across the international border in eastern Ontario and upstate New York.

Throughout the 1990s, Satan's Choice was the subject of unsolicited offers of a friendly take-over by the Hells Angels. The Hells Angels had for decades been prevented from expanding from Quebec into Ontario by the Outlaws. The split of 1977 caused Satan's Choice to favor the Angels against the Outlaws. However, Guindon – whose Canadian nationalism was described as "almost a mania" – repeatedly turned down offers all through the 1990s made by Hells Angels' national president Walter Stadnick to have Satan's Choice "patch over" to the Hells Angels. The journalist Jerry Langton wrote that Satan's Choice "...seemed to be the logical partners for the Hells Angels. Even through they had been weakened by defections to the Outlaws, they had an enviable network, a strong leadership crew, and a deep and abiding hatred for the Outlaws". However, Stadnick seemed more interested in the Loners than Satan's Choice. In June 1993, the Hells Angels, led by their national president Stadnick, hosted a party in Wasaga Beach attended by all of the Ontario biker gangs except the Outlaws and Satan's Choice. The party was seen as "an audition of sorts" to join the Hells Angels, and the guest of honor was Frank Lenti, the president of the Loners.

In November 1993, in what appeared to be an attempt to undermine Guindon's leadership of Satan's Choice, Stadnick met in Thunder Bay with several Satan's Choice chapter presidents, most notably Andre Wattel of the Kitchener chapter. As the Kitchener chapter was the most powerful and wealthiest chapter, Wattel had an oversized say in the running of Satan's Choice. Though the majority of Satan's Choice members favored an alliance with the Hells Angels, Guindon made the decision that individual members of Satan's Choice were free to do business with the Hells Angels, but there would be no official alliance nor a "patch over" to the Angels. In 1995, a third attempt was made to set up a Satan's Choice chapter in Hamilton. The president of the new Hamilton chapter was the professional wrestler Ion Croitoru. The decision to open a chapter was regarded as an insult to Mario Parente, the president of the Outlaws' Hamilton chapter. One policeman stated: "Oh, they hated Parente. And they knew it would piss him off to have another club in what he considered to be his town". By 1995, the Satan's Choice chapters in northern Ontario were buying the majority of their cocaine from the Hells Angels' Montreal chapter as well as the Hamilton chapter under Croitoru. Both the Hamilton chapter and the Sudbury chapter purchased the vast majority of their drugs from Richard "Rick" Vallée of the Angels Nomad chapter.

=== War with the Loners ===
In 1995, Satan's Choice made an alliance with the Diablos, a club led by a former Choice member, Frank Lenti, resulting in a biker war in the summer of 1995 with the Loners, a club which Lenti had founded before he was expelled from it the previous year. Langton wrote: "So desperate were the big biker gangs for every square inch of southern Ontario – especially prime real estate like Woodbridge – the Diablos were immediately courted". Satan's Choice agreed to sell drugs to the Diablos and offered the possibility of joining Satan's Choice, which angered the Loners, who were buying their drugs from the Hells Angels. Under pressure from the Hells Angels, the Loners came into conflict with the Diablos in the summer of 1995, who called upon Satan's Choice for help.

On 18 July 1995, a Diablo threw a homemade bomb at a tow truck owned by a Loner. Two days later, a Loner shot two Diablos, although the injuries to both men were only very slight. Brawls between the Loners and Satan's Choice became common in the summer of 1995, causing injuries to multiple people. Satan's Choice ambushed three Loners in Woodbridge, shooting three of them, who all survived their wounds. Several businesses belonging to members of both clubs, such as a tattoo parlor, a motorcycle repair shop and a bar, were bombed. On 1 August 1995, the Toronto clubhouse of Satan's Choice on Kintyre Avenue – which was backing the Diablos – was hit by a rocket fired from a military rocket launcher by the Loners. The Canadian journalist Yves Lavigne wrote the explosion caused by the rocket "tore a large hole in the door and blew windows out of three neighboring houses, but did not injure the five bikers inside the building". Later the same night at 3:35 am, Satan's Choice tossed a bomb through the window of the Pluto's Place tattoo parlor owned by a Loner on Lake Shore Boulevard, setting off a fire that caused $50,000 in damage. The next day three Molotov cocktails were tossed at Bazooka Jacks bar in Markham that was popular with Satan's Choice members. On 16 August 1995, Satan's Choice struck back by firing a rocket – again from a military rocket launcher – at the Loners' Woodbridge clubhouse. Despite the lurid headlines in the newspapers, Satan's Choice was not committed to an all-out struggle against the Loners, and Lorne Campbell made an agreement with the Loners that all of York Region north of Highway 7 was a "no war zone". On 25 August 1995, Lenti was badly wounded by a bomb planted in his car. With Lenti in the hospital, the Diablos collapsed which marked the end of the war.

The mayor of Toronto, Barbara Hall, unaware that the war was over, attempted to ban all outlaw bikers from Toronto. Langton wrote the "frequently hysterical Toronto media" vastly exaggerated the amount of violence, causing Hall's over-reaction. Her attempt to shut down the Satan's Choice clubhouse in Toronto proved impossible due to the Charter of Rights and Freedoms, leading her to try to have the city of Toronto buy the clubhouse in order to shut it down. On 18 September 1995, Hall opened talks with the Satan's Choice counsel, Karl Jaffary, saying that the city of Toronto would literally pay any price to own the clubhouse on Kintrye Avenue. The Choice set an absurdly high price for the clubhouse, which caused much controversy in Toronto when Hall indicated her willingness to pay it. On 20 October 1995, the city of Toronto ended the talks once it was apparent that Satan's Choice would set up a new clubhouse in Toronto after the city purchased the current one on Kintyre Avenue, a possibility that Hall had not considered until that point as she seemed to believe that buying the current clubhouse would banish Satan's Choice from Toronto forever. The controversy is believed to have been a factor in Hall's defeat in her 1997 reelection bid as the media took to calling Hall "Biker Barb". Despite the biker war that saw the Hells Angels back the Loners against Satan's Choice, Stadnick did not wish to keep Satan's Choice as his enemies, and afterwards set out to rebuild his damaged relationships with the Choice leaders. By 1995, Satan's Choice were again the largest biker gang in Ontario with 118 members in 7 chapters compared with the Para-Dice Riders that had 61 members in 2 chapters; the Vagabonds that had 70 members in 1 chapter; the Outlaws that had 68 members in 7 chapters; the Loners with 62 members in 2 chapters and the Last Chance that had 20 members in 1 chapter.

=== Project Dismantle and the Sudbury police station bombing ===
In 1996, Guindon retired as Satan's Choice national president, although he remained a member of the club. Making matters worse, Satan's Choice the same year was targeted by a major police operation dubbed Project Dismantle, which involved almost 300 officers from the OPP, as well as the municipal police forces of Halton, Durham, Hamilton–Wentworth, Waterloo, Sudbury, and Metropolitan Toronto. In May 1996, the OPP launched Project Dismantle, charging 161 people associated with Satan's Choice with 1,192 violations of the criminal code, mostly relating to narcotics, while seizing drugs with a street value of $1.05 million together with two marijuana labs capable of producing crops with an annual yield worth $13.8 million. The purpose of Project Dismantle was to convict every member, associate and girlfriend of Satan's Choice, to which end about 250,000 phone conversations were recorded while seizing some $3 million in cash and property. The clubhouses in Hamilton and Toronto were seized as the proceeds of crime. The chapters that suffered the most from Operation Dismantle were the ones in Hamilton, Sudbury, Thunder Bay and Milton, while the other chapters escaped relatively unscathed.

The result of the Project Dismantle raids included the seizure of marijuana plants and hydroponic equipment valued at $11 million, as well as more than $125,000 in cash and over $265,000 worth of other drugs including cocaine. The police forces also seized a variety of firearms, including twelve handguns, five non-restricted rifles, and seven restricted weapons such as automatic pistols, sawed-off shotguns, and even machine guns such as a World War II-era Bren gun and tripod. In Sudbury, the operation specifically targeted the local chapter of Satan's Choice and members of the Hamilton chapter, which all but wiped out both chapters. This specific part of the operation involved a police surveillance operation that caught Satan's Choice members discussing the bombing of a strip club which had disrespected several members of the club. Many of the members of these chapters found themselves in prison or otherwise leaving the club, with the Sudbury chapter being reduced to just three full members from the peak of eight members and two "hangarounds". Unfortunately for those involved with Project Dismantle, no convictions were ever given as a result of the charges and arrests stemming from this operation. This was partly as a result of most of the wiretap evidence being excluded in September 2003 after Justice John McDonald of the Ontario Superior Court found that a senior OPP detective lied to five different Superior Court justices to get the wiretaps approved, in addition to destroying other evidence. As a result of Project Dismantle, Satan's Choice membership fell from 135 in 1995 down to 70 in September 1998.

Ion Croitoru, a thuggish professional wrestler and the president of Satan's Choice Hamilton chapter, was involved in a plot to bomb a police station in Sudbury on 15 December 1996. Len Isnor of the OPP's Anti-Biker Unit was not impressed with Croitoru, calling him "just stupid". However, Croitoru's career in professional wrestling made him a local celebrity in Hamilton and to a lesser extent elsewhere in Ontario. By contrast, Isnor described Michel Dubé, the president of the Choice's Sudbury chapter, as one of the most dangerous outlaw bikers in Ontario.

Croitoru was very close to Dubé and often visited Sudbury to see him. It was apparently Croitoru's intention to blow up the Solid Gold strip club because he and Dubé had been refused admittance earlier that year, but Dubé diverted the plan into blowing up the police station instead. In early December 1996, Croitoru visited Sudbury to see Dubé with his followers "Jimmy Rich" (a court-ordered pseudonym), Garry Noble, Gordie Cunningham and a man known as "Lebanese Joe". In the parking lot of the Solid Gold strip club, Croitoru was surprised to see the members of the Sudbury chapter take off their colors and put them into their cars. When he asked why, he was told that the Solid Gold did not permit the wearing of gang colors. Croitoru shouted "We wear our colors wherever the fuck we want!", which inspired Dubé to shout "fuck yeah!" in agreement; the assembled Satan's Choice bikers then attempted to enter the Solid Gold wearing jackets with their Satan's Choice patches, where the bouncers promptly refused them all entrance. When the bikers continued to try to enter the Solid Gold, the police were called. Seeking revenge, Croitoru had a member of the Hamilton chapter, Jure "Jerry" Juretta build a bomb. Juretta was a former soldier in the Canadian Army and was an expert with explosives. Croitoru and Juretta then drove to Sudbury to hand over the bomb to Dubé. The bomb was handed over by Croitoru and Juretta to Dubé and vice-president Brian Davies of the Sudbury chapter at a Tim Horton's where Highway 69 and Notre Dame Avenue intersected in the Lockerby district of South Sudbury. The bomb was planted by Neil Passenen, a friend of Dubé's.

The bombing occurred at 2 am just after a Christmas party on 15 December 1996, and only one police dispatcher was wounded by the blast. In May 1997, Isnor came into contact with a drug dealer known as "Ed" due to a court order who was behind in his payments to the Sherbrooke chapter of the Hells Angels and wanted to turn informer. "Ed" ended up obtaining an impression of Isnor's American Express credit card and went on a lengthy spending spree before Isnor had him arrested. "Ed" was staying at a motel in Orilla and managed to convince the manager that Isnor was his brother who had left with his wallet, making him unable to pay for a pizza he had just ordered. The manager gave "Ed" Isnor's American Express number from the registry, which allowed "Ed" to use the number to spend thousands of dollars at Isnor's expense. Isnor had "Ed" arrested and thrown into the "Barrie Bucket" jail in Barrie. Fearing he would face a lengthy prison sentence for spending thousands of dollars on Isnor's credit card, "Ed" told him that his cellmate was boasting about being involved in the bombing. The cellmate turned out to be Gordie Cunningham of Satan's Choice Hamilton chapter, who had been arrested for drug possession in Barrie.

"Ed" had befriended Cunningham and agreed to wear a wire for Isnor in exchange for the charges being dropped against him. "Ed" joined the Hamilton chapter and lived with Cunningham as a boarder. "Ed" was able to obtain evidence that Cunningham was involved in drug dealing. After Cunningham was arrested, he promptly turned Crown's evidence in exchange for immunity. Cunningham then revealed the story behind the bombing. Isnor then dispatched "Ed" to Sudbury, where he befriended Russell Martin of the Sudbury chapter and accompanied him on several cocaine buys. Dubé was pressing Martin to kill the vice-president of the Sudbury chapter, Brian Davies, and when he refused, he started to suspect that Dubé was going to kill him as well. This impression was further increased by Dubé's erratic and irascible behavior. After Martin was arrested due to the evidence provided by "Ed", he in turn turned informer for the OPP's Anti-Biker Enforcement Unit. Martin told Isnor that he had been ordered to kill Davies, an order that he found himself incapable of obeying. Davies was confronted by Isnor who told him Dubé was planning to kill him, leading to Davies to turn white with fear and say "You're absolutely right". The evidence provided by Davies led to Dubé and Croitoru being charged as Isnor gave orders to arrest both men. The national leadership had the Hamilton chapter disbanded, while Croitoru was expelled as a "loose cannon".

Croitoru was convicted of trafficking in steroids and for having the bomb built while Dubé, who was facing charges of two counts of murder plus charges relating to the bombing, hanged himself in jail on 22 September 1998. Dubé was facing one count of first-degree murder charge relating to the 1988 murder of Claude Briere, who was a prominent drug dealer in Sudbury. Dubé was also the main suspect in the 1996 murder of Alexander Sretenovic aka "Alex Atso". Briere disappeared in September 1988 and his corpse was found three weeks later on 17 October 1988, while Sretenovic disappeared on 14 August 1996 after boasting about how he helped Dubé kill Briere. Isnor was dismissive of Satan's Choice by the 1990s, saying: "Satan's Choice were never the big guys, they were nickel and dime. The Loners were always Stadnick's favorites".

Guindon had been a professional boxer in addition to being an outlaw biker and by the late 1990s, he was beginning to suffer from brain damage caused by his boxing career. Increasingly, Andre Wattel, the president of the Choice's Kitchener chapter, began to exercise leadership and Wattel, unlike Guindon, was much more open to joining the Hells Angels. As a result of Project Dismantle, the level of screening for new members fell off, and the Oshawa chapter accepted Steven "Hannibal" Gault. The club's rules required that a new member be sponsored by a member who had known him for at least five years; Gault's sponsor William Lavoie had only known him for five months and had been bribed in the form of $20,000 by Gault to say otherwise. Gault was a career criminal who specialized in cheating senior citizens out of their life savings, and had joined Satan's Choice with the aim of selling them out to the police. Gault sold information to the police, first about Satan's Choice and then the Hells Angels, until 2006. Gault, who once bit off a man's ear in a bar fight, was described by his ex-wife Linda Sebastiao: "After he got his full patch he thought he was king of the world." Gault was paid $1 million by the Ontario government for his work as an informer and as of 2011 he was delinquent in paying children support.

=== Alliance and merger with the Hells Angels ===
Satan's Choice, under their new club president Andre Wattel, decided to join the Hells Angels and abandon their own club's identity and autonomy because it would mutually benefit their criminal enterprises. Satan's Choice, along with most of the other major Ontario biker gangs, including the Loners, Lobos, and Para-Dice Riders, "patched over" to the Hells Angels on December 29, 2000. A total of 168 bikers "patched over" on that day. This overnight placed the Hells Angels in a position of dominance in Ontario, and in effect put an end to any independent existence of the Satan's Choice Motorcycle Club. The Satan's Choice chapters in Kitchener, Oshawa, Sudbury, Thunder Bay, Keswick, Simcoe County and Toronto all became Hells Angels chapters. The Toronto chapter of Satan's Choice became the new Toronto East chapter of the Hells Angels. The Outlaws would later find their Ontario operations crippled by Project Retire of 25 September 2002, an undertaking by Ontario police targeting the club.

However, many former members of Satan's Choice would remain active criminals after the club was dismantled, such as the former president of the Hamilton chapter Ion Croitoru, who would be charged but not convicted of the murder of Lynn and Fred Gilbank in January 2005. Kirby left Satan's Choice in March 1976 and went to work for the 'Ndrangheta. One of the Satan's Choice members who "patched over" to the Hells Angels on 29 December 2000 was Steven Gault, who continued to work as a police informer within the Angels. Gault, who became the treasurer of the Hells Angels' Oshawa chapter, played a key role in the OPP's Project Tandem of 2005–2006 that led to numerous Angels being convicted of various offenses. Guindon joined the Hells Angels at the "patch over" in 2000, and remained a member of the Angels' Oshawa chapter until April 2006, when he retired out of the belief that Gault was an informer who setting him up to be arrested. Lorne Campbell also joined the Hell Angels in 2000, and served as the president of the Hells Angels' Sudbury chapter. On 22 May 2011, he was convicted of conspiracy to traffic in cocaine. In June 2011, he retired from the Hells Angels as a member in "good standing".

Campbell claimed that "Pigpen" Berry had retired and was running a "charming" bed and breakfast resort in the Ontario countryside. Peter Edwards, the crime correspondent of the Toronto Star stated that Berry had indeed retired, but was living in hiding as of 2015. Wattel, the president of Satan's Choice Kitchener chapter, became the president of the Hells Angels Kitchener chapter. On 15 December 2009, the OPP launched Project Manchester against the Hells Angels, and Watteel was charged with one count of gangsterism, 28 counts of narcotics trafficking and 27 counts of the possession of the proceeds of crime. Wattel was a locally prominent businessman who owned The Barking Fish Café restaurant in Cambridge. On 12 January 2011, he was convicted of various charges relating to conspiracy to traffic in illegal narcotics, being sentenced to four and half years in prison. McEwen, the second Satan's Choice president, died as a forgotten man on 27 January 2012 in Saskatoon, Saskatchewan, still working as a humble dishwasher. Sauvé later became a noted prisoners' rights activist who, in 1993, won a decade-long legal fight ending at the Supreme Court of Canada to give prisoners the right to vote.

In July 2017, a new motorcycle club identifying themselves as Satan's Choice emerged using the same patch, but otherwise not connected to the original club. The Satan's Choice of 2017 had chapters in Durham and Ottawa, with 48 full-patch members and two prospects. Len Isnor of the OPP's Anti-Biker Enforcement Unit stated: "It’s a bit shocking. By somebody bringing them back, there could be some problems. Yes, we’re going to watch." Donny Petersen, the national secretary of the Hells Angels, used his Facebook page to attack the new club, writing: "Those who take a patch from a respected club, one that has history, courage, who has paid their dues, died, done time and all the rest... like what are you thinking? You are pretenders". Lorne Campbell stated that it was an "insult" for the new club to use the name and patch of the former Satan's Choice and predicted violence. A spokesman for the group stated that they were considering disbanding. The group seems to have disbanded as nothing has been heard of the gang since 2017.

=== 2025 Revival ===
In August 2025, Harley Davidson Guindon announced on his Facebook page that he was planning a revival of the club. “The Choice is back,” Guindon said on Facebook, describing the revival of the club as “[his] destiny.” Guindon stated that he was restarting the Satan’s Choice, with the permission of his father Bernie Guindon, and that he had patched over several clubs. Other social media posts reportedly show new Satan's Choice chapters established in Sudbury, Thunder Bay, Oshawa and Hamilton, while Ontario Provincial Police say such clubs can be found in cities like Sudbury, Sault Ste. Marie, Timmins and North Bay.

In response to Harley's statement, the Durham Regional Police Service stated: “We are aware of the re-emergence of the Satan’s Choice Motorcycle Club in our region and the DRPS Biker Enforcement Unit will continue to monitor for criminal activities associated to all motorcycle clubs operating in Durham Region."

Similarly the Ontario Provincial Police stated that officers are “aware of recent social media content relating to outlaw motorcycle gang activity in Durham Region.”

== Filmography ==
- Satan's Choice (1965). National Film Board of Canada. Directed by Donald Shebib.

== Bibliography ==
- Auger, Michel; Edwards, Peter (2012). The Encyclopedia of Canadian Organized Crime: From Captain Kidd to Mom Boucher. Toronto: McClelland & Stewart. ISBN 978-0771030499.
- Edwards, Peter (2013). Unrepentant The Strange and (Sometimes) Terrible Life of Lorne Campbell, Satan's Choice and Hells Angels Biker. Toronto: Vintage Canada. ISBN 9780307362575.
- Edwards, Peter (2017). Hard Road: Bernie Guindon and the Reign of the Satan's Choice Motorcycle Club. Toronto: Random House. ISBN 978-0345816108.
- Fogarty, Catherine (2021). Murder on the Inside The True Story of the Deadly Riot at Kingston Penitentiary. Windsor: Biblioasis. ISBN 9781771964029.
- Langton, Jerry (2006). Fallen Angel: The Unlikely Rise of Walter Stadnick and the Canadian Hells Angels. Toronto: Harper Collins. ISBN 144342725X.
- Gray, Charlotte (2013). The Massey Murder: A Maid, Her Master and the Trial that Shocked a Country. Toronto: HarperCollins. ISBN 9781443409254.
- Henderson, Stuart Robert (2011). Making the Scene: Yorkville and Hip Toronto in the 1960s. Toronto: University of Toronto Press. ISBN 978-1442610712.
- Langton, Jerry (2010). Showdown: How the Outlaws, Hells Angels and Cops Fought for Control of the Streets. Toronto: John Wiley & Sons. ISBN 978-0470678787.
- Lavigne, Yves (1999). Hells Angels at War. Toronto: HarperCollins. ISBN 9780002000246.
- Lowe, Mick (2013). A Conspiracy of Brothers: A True Story of Bikers, Murder and the Law. Toronto: Vintage Canada. ISBN 978-0345813169.
- McCarthy, Eugene (1998). The Biker the Stripper and the Cop: A True Story. New Hamburg: English Garden Publishers. ISBN 0969887361.
- Melcher, Graeme (2018). "Rebellion on the Road and Outlaw Biker Clubs in Postwar Ontario". In Gossage, Peter; Rutherdale, Robert (eds.). Making Men, Making History: Canadian Masculinities across Time and Place. Vancouver: University of British Columbia Press. pp. 364–382. ISBN 978-0774835664.
- Sanger, Daniel (2005). Hell's Witness. Toronto: Viking Canada. ISBN 0-670-04430-X.
- Schneider, Stephen (2009). Iced: The Story of Organized Crime in Canada (2nd ed.). Toronto: John Wiley & Sons. ISBN 978-0470835005.
- Wolf, David (1991). The Rebels: A Brotherhood of Outlaw Bikers. Toronto: University of Toronto Press. ISBN 0802073638.
