= Black Diamond Riders Motorcycle Club =

Black Diamond Riders MC
- Founded: 1953; 73 years ago
- Founding location: Toronto, Ontario, Canada
- Years active: 1953–present
- Territory: Greater Toronto area
- Leader: Harry Paul Barnes
- Activities: Drug trafficking, extortion, assault, kidnapping
- Rivals: Satan's Choice Motorcycle Club

The Black Diamond Riders Motorcycle Club is a Toronto-based Canadian outlaw motorcycle club.

== Founding ==
In the late 1940s, Harry Paul Barnes, a.k.a. " "Johnny Sombrero"", of Toronto was a member of the Humber Valley Riders Motorcycle Club, but broke away in 1951 to found the Black Diamond Riders. The Black Diamond Riders were notorious as the most violent biker gang in Toronto in the 1950s and Peter Edwards, the crime correspondent of the Toronto Star wrote: "Some fights were so ferocious that Queen Street in Toronto had to be blocked off to accommodate the young thugs".

The clubhouse of the Black Diamond Riders was located at Steeles and Dufferin Street in Toronto, which consisted of a house along with a swimming pool; a cage for the mascot of the Black Diamond Riders, namely a white rabbit; and for some reason a burial ground for groundhogs. Barnes stated in a 2015 interview: "We had five acres of land. We had rabbits, foxes, pheasants by the dozens, groundhogs". In the late 1950s-early 1960s, the Black Diamond Riders were in the words of the American journalist Mick Lowe the "undisputed kingpins" of the biker scene in the Toronto area as Barnes engaged in "often heavy-handed maneuvers" that forced most of the other biker gangs to disband.

== The "Battle of Pebblestone" ==
In 1962, the Black Diamond Riders violated the outlaw biker code by attacking other bikers at a field day where bikers show off their bikers and where violence was forbidden. During the field day at the Pebblestone Golf Course in Courtice, the Black Diamond Riders kept to themselves and fashioned makeshift weapons by ripping off tree branches. At the signal given by Barnes, the Black Diamond Riders charged and attacked the other bikers. The Black Diamond mercilessly beat the bikers and stole their motorcycles. The American journalist Mick Lowe wrote: "The Battle of Pebblestone sent a chill through all of the Toronto-area clubs." Barnes followed up his triumph at what the media called the "Battle of Pebblestone" by riding down the Gardiner Expressway along with the other Black Diamond Riders in the wrong direction. Media reports in 1963 described the Black Diamond Riders as a biker gang "terrorized high school dance halls, staged brawls and administered serious beatings to whoever was considered an opponent."

== Decline ==
To end the attacks of the Black Diamond Riders, four other biker gangs merged under the leadership of Bernie Guindon to found Satan's Choice Motorcycle Club in 1965. Satan's Choice greatly outnumbered the Black Diamond Riders, and in turn used their numerical superiority to beat the Black Diamond Riders in a series of brawls across the Toronto area in 1965–1966. At the conclusion of the conflict, Guindon imposed the new boundaries of the Black Diamond Riders, giving them a small slice of Toronto as their territory while taking the rest for Satan's Choice.

After losing the biker war to Satan's Choice, the Black Diamond Riders dwindled, going from having 200 members in 1963 to having 15 members in 1968. A 1973 report by the Ontario Provincial Police listed the Black Diamond Riders as being marginal in the drug market in Toronto. However, the Satan's Choice hitman Cecil Kirby shot up the clubhouse of the Black Diamond Riders one night in 1974 for no better reason than he disliked Barnes, whom Kirby stated had "a really big mouth".

== "Sudbury Saturday Night" ==
In the early 1990s, the Black Diamond Riders experienced a resurgence and planned to found a chapter in Sudbury, which was viewed as a threat by Guindon. On a Saturday night during the Labour Day weekend in 1992, a brawl broke in the parking lot of the Sorrento Motor Hotel in Sudbury, where Barnes and 6 other Black Diamond Riders were beaten up by Guindon along with 44 other Satan's Choice bikers armed with guns, knives, boards and baseball bats. Barnes said of the brawl: "There were about forty-five of them. Attacked seven of us. They shot two of us. They shot him in the guts and shot me in the face". The brawl came to be known as the "Sudbury Saturday Night" in biker circles.

== Last years ==
After the brawl in Sudbury, the Black Diamond Riders faded into irreverence. The Black Diamond Riders last played an important role in the biker world in 1996 when Barnes expelled a number of Black Diamond Riders who had challenged him. The expelled Black Diamond Riders founded what journalist Jerry Langton called the "rather forlornly named" Lost Souls Motorcycle Club of Milton. Instead of rejoining the Black Diamond Riders, Satan's Choice to made a better offer, leading for the Lost Souls to join Satan's Choice on 13 April 1996. After the "Sudbury Saturday Night" brawl, Barnes seemed determined to stay clear of crime and have the Black Diamond Riders serve as an actual motorcycle club instead of being a criminal organization that masqueraded as a motorcycle club. The Black Diamond Riders have been described as no longer involved in crime. When Barnes died in 2016, the gang had 40 members, the majority of whom were older men in their 70s and 80s.

== Books and articles ==
- Edwards, Peter (2013). Unrepentant The Strange and (Sometimes) Terrible Life of Lorne Campbell, Satan's Choice and Hells Angels Biker. Toronto: Vintage Canada. ISBN 9780307362575.
- Edwards, Peter (2017). Hard Road: Bernie Guindon and the Reign of the Satan's Choice Motorcycle Club. Toronto: Random House. ISBN 978-0345816108.
- Langton, Jerry (2006). Fallen Angel: The Unlikely Rise of Walter Stadnick and the Canadian Hells Angels. Toronto: Harper Collins. ISBN 144342725X.
- Lavigne, Yves (1999). Hells Angels at War. Toronto: HarperCollins. ISBN 9780002000246.
- Lowe, Mick (2013). A Conspiracy of Brothers: A True Story of Bikers, Murder and the Law. Toronto: Vintage Canada. ISBN 978-0345813169.
- Melcher, Graeme (2018). "Rebellion on the Road and Outlaw Biker Clubs in Postwar Ontario". In Gossage, Peter; Rutherdale, Robert (eds.). Making Men, Making History: Canadian Masculinities across Time and Place. Vancouver: University of British Columbia Press. pp. 364–382. ISBN 978-0774835664.
