= Harry Paul Barnes =

Canadian outlaw biker and gangster

Harry Barnes
- Born: Harold Paul Barnes; 12 May 1935; Toronto, Ontario, Canada
- Died: 5 November 2016 (aged 81); Toronto, Ontario, Canada
- Other name: "Johnny Sombrero"
- Occupations: Outlaw biker; crime boss
- Known for: Founder of the Black Diamond Riders
- Allegiance: Black Diamond Riders MC

Harold Paul Barnes (12 May 1935 – 5 November 2016), better known as "Johnny Sombrero", was a Canadian outlaw biker and gangster who was the founder and leader of the Black Diamond Riders Motorcycle Club of Toronto.

== Early life ==
Barnes was born in the Junction district in Toronto, the son of a British father and an Italian mother. His father, a working class Englishman from Carlisle in the north of England, was a quiet, reserved man while his dominating mother, a Calabrian woman from Siderno, ruled the household. Barnes's mother was a Commisso related to the Commisso 'ndrina of the 'Ndrangheta, and throughout his criminal career, Barnes benefitted from his 'Ndrangheta ties. In an interview, Barnes stated: "My mother was very violent. She used to beat the shit out of me. She told every day of my life she was going to kill me...She hit me with her hand and hurt her hand. Kicked me and hurt her foot. Then she went for the rolling pin". When being sentenced for one of his crimes in 1963, Barnes told the judge that "I fear no man and only one woman".

== Black Diamond Riders ==
As a teenager, Barnes joined a biker gang called the Humber Valley Riders, but broke away in 1951 to found his own biker gang, the Black Diamond Riders. In his founding speech, Barnes proclaimed himself the "Supreme Commander", a title he ripped off from the title used by General Dwight D. Eisenhower when he served as the Supreme Commander of the Allied Expeditionary Force in north-west Europe during World War II. Barnes told his followers: "I don't care what you say. It's only my way or it's not done". As an young man, Barnes stood 5'10 tall and weighted 245 pounds while having a barrel-shaped chest. Barnes described himself as an young man as "bulging with muscles". He rode around in a Harley-Davidson motorcycle with sheet-metal mufflers he added himself or drove a Cadillac. Barnes regularly took part in brawls on Queen Street that led to the police putting up blockades on the area while outrunning the police in his motorcycle. In 1956, Barnes declared a biker war on the first version of Satan's Choice. Barnes said of his action: "The first time I invaded their clubhouse I had to. They were invading our property". Barnes offered up "beer bounties" when he provided a case of beer to any Black Diamond Rider who take away the "colors" from a Satan's Choice member.

In 1961, Barnes first met Bernie "The Frog" Guindon of the Golden Hawk Riders, a meeting that ended badly when Guindon refused to address Barnes as "Supreme Commander". In 1962, there occurred the "Battle of Pebblestone" at the Pebblestone Golf Course in the village of Courtice, when during a biker "field day", Barnes and the Black Diamond Riders violated the biker code by attacking the other bikers present at the "field day" when they were showing off their bikes to the public. During the brawl, Barnes along with another Black Diamond Rider, Tom Bird, personally fought Guindon, who knocked out Bird with his fist and forced Barnes to retreat. The victory at the "Battle of Pebblestone" as the media called the brawl made Barnes famous in Toronto. In 1962, Barnes set up an ambush that forced Satan's Choice to disband at gunpoint. Barnes told the media at the time: "We took all their crests and told them they couldn't exist any longer. I wiped them out twice, the Choice".

A colorful character, Barnes spoke often to the media and portrayed himself as engaged in a crusade to defend Canada's British heritage, which he somehow connected to his criminal activities. In 1963, Barnes wrote a long letter to Queen Elizabeth II asking for a royal charter to rid Canada all of the other outlaw biker gangs except for the Black Diamond Riders. Barnes's letter was not answered. By this point, Barnes was regarded as a "semi-mythical" figure in Toronto, the leader of the largest outlaw biker gang whose colorful antics kept him constantly in the news. Media reports in 1963 described Barnes as a "beefy, tough-talking" young man who led a biker gang of about 200 that "terrorized high school dance halls, staged brawls and administered serious beatings to whoever was considered an opponent." In 1963, a series of "lightning police raids" led to Barnes being jailed for three months for selling alcohol illegally.

It was to end the attacks of the Black Diamond Riders that led to a merger in 1965 of four biker gangs, namely the Phantom Riders of Oshawa, the Canadian Lancers of Scarborough, the Wild Ones of Port Credit and the Throttle Twisters of Preston into a super-biker gang, Satan's Choice led by Guindon. Guindon used the name Satan's Choice because he knew it would enrage Barnes. The new Satan's Club promptly defeated the Black Diamond Riders owing to their superior numbers. Guindon followed up his victory by dictating the territory of the Black Diamond Riders, who fell into decline. By 1968, the Black Diamond Riders had only 15 members compared to the 200 they had in 1963.

=== Decline ===
In 1973, a police report stated the Black Diamond Riders were only minor players in the drug trade in Toronto. Despite the police report, Barnes who worked as a plumber, owned a stylist house in an upper-middle class district of Toronto, giving rise to suspicions that he was engaged in gangsterism. Barnes still struck to delusions of grandeur, telling a journalist from The Globe & Mail: "so I broke a couple of arms and split some guy's skull from here to there...I'm a liberal-monarchist. I feel like shooting some of those people the way they talk against the Queen". Barnes claimed not to be in the drug trade, saying: "I don't know what my boys do at home or someplace. You know, grass and stuff. Who knows? But nobody in this club gonna get into the real drug thing. Look, this is going to sound corny but I'm a nationalist, see. I believe in a strong Canada. You gonna have a strong country, you gotta have strong young men. And any guy who gets on dope won't make it". Barnes complained that it was difficult to work given he kept going to prison, saying he had lost much time to prison owing to the occasion when he ripped somebody's eye out of its socket, which costed him several years of his life to serving a prison term.

In September 1992, Barnes led the Black Diamond Riders into a notably bloody brawl in a motel parking lot in Sudbury against the Sudbury chapter of Satan's Choice. The Labour Day weekend brawl on 5 September 1992, which came to be known as the "Sudbury Saturday Night" was to block Barne's attempt to set up a Black Diamond Riders chapter in Sudbury. Barnes along with several Black Diamond Riders had beaten up a Satan's Choice biker on the streets of Sudbury and stolen his gang "colors". The matter was considered sufficiently important for Guindon himself to lead 45 Satan's Choice members armed with guns, knives, boards, and baseball bats against eight Black Diamond Riders led by Barnes. Barnes recalled: "There were about forty-five of them. Attacked seven of us. They shot two of us. They shot him in the guts and shot me in the face". The journalist Jerry Langton described Barnes as an "all-round tough guy" who still commanded respect in the biker world in the 1990s despite leading a club that had only a shadowy existence since the 1960s. In 1996, Barnes expelled a number of Black Diamond Riders who founded the forlornly named Lost Souls Motorcycle Club of Milton.

In 2011, Barnes was arrested for keeping illegal guns. David Costa, who defended Barnes, said of him: "He was colorful and he definitely had an independent streak. He didn’t like to be pushed around". The trial ended with the charges being dismissed. In the summer of 2012, Barnes happened to run into his old enemy Guindon at an antiques show in the Kawartha Lakes region and ended their long feud by embracing Guindon. In his last years, Barnes was a friend of Guindon whom he often socialized with.

== Death ==
Barnes died on 5 November 2016 of diabetes and heart disease, at the age of 81. His funeral took place at Ward Funeral Home on Weston Road in Toronto and was attended by members of various biker clubs from Canada and the United States. He was buried in a coffin wrapped in a Union Jack, which reflected his Anglophilia.

== Books ==
- Edwards, Peter (2013). Unrepentant The Strange and (Sometimes) Terrible Life of Lorne Campbell, Satan's Choice and Hells Angels Biker. Toronto: Vintage Canada. ISBN 9780307362575.
- Edwards, Peter (2017). Hard Road: Bernie Guindon and the Reign of the Satan's Choice Motorcycle Club. Toronto: Random House. ISBN 978-0345816108.
- Langton, Jerry (2006). Fallen Angel: The Unlikely Rise of Walter Stadnick and the Canadian Hells Angels. Toronto: Harper Collins. ISBN 144342725X.
- Lowe, Mick (2013). A Conspiracy of Brothers: A True Story of Bikers, Murder and the Law. Toronto: Vintage Canada. ISBN 978-0345813169.
- Melcher, Graeme (2018). "Rebellion on the Road and Outlaw Biker Clubs in Postwar Ontario". In Gossage, Peter; Rutherdale, Robert (eds.). Making Men, Making History: Canadian Masculinities across Time and Place. Vancouver: University of British Columbia Press. pp. 364–382. ISBN 978-0774835664.
