= Bernie Guindon =

Canadian outlaw biker and gangster (born 1942)

- Born: Bernard Dieudonné Guindon; 19 November 1942 (age 84); Hull, Quebec, Canada
- Other name: "The Frog"
- Occupations: Outlaw biker; crime boss; boxer
- Years active: 1958–2006
- Known for: National president of Satan's Choice
- Allegiance: Golden Hawk Riders MC (1959–1962); Phantom Riders MC (1963–1965); Satan's Choice MC (1965–2000); Hells Angels MC (2000–2006); Satan's Choice MC (2025–present)
- Convictions: Sexual assault (1969); Conspiracy to manufacture and distribute narcotics (1976)
- Penalty: 5 years' imprisonment (1969); 17 years' imprisonment (1976)

Bernard Dieudonné Guindon (born 19 November 1942), better known as "Bernie the Frog", is a Canadian former outlaw biker, gangster and boxer, best known as the founder and national president of Satan's Choice Motorcycle Club from 1965 to 2000. He was later a member of the Hells Angels until his retirement in 2006.

== Youth ==
Guindon was born in Hull, Quebec (modern Gatineau) to French-Canadian parents. His mother, Lucy, was an illiterate woman from rural Quebec who dropped out of school in Grade 1 while his father, Lucien, was a petty criminal from Buckingham who worked as a bootlegger. The Guindon family were itinerant in his early years, living at various locations in Quebec and northern Ontario. In Ontario at the time, bars and liquor stores closed very early, and Lucien Guindon, who ended settling up in Oshawa, sold alcohol out of his house to those who wanted to drink past the closing time, charging double the price in the liquor stores. In his native Quebec, the bars and liquor stores stayed open late, causing Lucienne Guindon to relocate to Ontario, where bootlegging was more profitable. Guindon pere also served as a fence for corrupt Oshawa policemen who wanted to sell items that they had stolen while performing their duties.

Guindon fils grew up in Oshawa surrounded by criminality and violence, recalling his father as a thuggish man who was very good with fists and whose favorite form of entertainment was watching his sons punch each other out. To amuse his father, Guindon constantly fought his older brother Jacques "Jack" Guindon, and usually got the better of him, causing a lifelong sibling rivalry. Guindon's father often beat his mother. Guindon's mother was the main emotional support as he grew up and tried hard to pass on her Catholic faith to her son. Guindon later defined his attitude towards Catholicism: "There's somebody up there, but I don't know who the fuck He is...I'm not at all religious. I used to hate being on my knees all the time, saying prayers and losing a couple of hours every Sunday".

As a Catholic and French-Canadian in Ontario, a province that at the time was largely English-Canadian and Protestant, Guindon was constantly involved in brawls while growing up, remembering how "I used to go across the street and fight all the Protestants". At the Holy Cross Elementary School, Guindon was a poor student who failed at everything. Guindon's first language is French, but he became fluent in English due to growing up in Oshawa. Guindon was frequently beaten by a nun he called "Dirty Gertie". As a young man, Guindon excelled at boxing and ultimately came to be trained by the Canadian heavyweight champion George Chuvalo. When Guindon was 15, he came to the defense of his mother who was being beaten by his father, and proceeded to beat up his father in turn. Lucienne Guindon abandoned his family shortly afterwards. Lucy Guindon found a boyfriend who owned a motorcycle and who allowed his stepson to ride it. Guindon later recalled about his first time riding a motorcycle that "it was unbelievable", marking the beginning of a lifelong love of motorcycles. As a teenager, Guindon met another French-Canadian teenager living in Oshawa, Suzanne "Nicky" Blais, while working at a gas station, whom he bonded with as he spoke to her in French. Blais was from Montreal, but her mother, dissatisfied with the education offered to girls in Quebec's collèges classiques (which only trained girls to be housewives and mothers) had moved to Oshawa in 1958 to give her a "modern" education in English. Upon first seeing Guindon, Blais recalled saying to her mother "qui est ce mec mignon qui pompe le gaz?" ("who is that cute guy pumping the gas?") and insisted that her mother pull over to that gas station so she could talk to him. Guindon was to have on-off relationship with her that lasted decades before marrying her in 2009.

As a youth full of machismo and a rebellious streak, Guindon was fascinated with the outlaw biker lifestyle and purchased a motorcycle which he named the "Wild Thing". In 1959, at the age of 17, Guindon joined the Golden Hawk Riders outlaw biker club. Guindon's biographer, Peter Edwards, described him as riding his motorcycle down the streets of Oshawa like "a conquering hero". Although bike helmets were not mandatory in Ontario until 1969, Guindon always wore one as his "punch-enhancer". In November 1961, Guindon married for the first time after his teenage girlfriend Veronica became pregnant with the first of his many children, but he continued his womanizing and continued to insist that Blais was his true love. In April 1963, Blais married someone else. Despite being French-Canadian, Guindon did not object to his nickname "Bernie the Frog".

== Rise to power ==
Starting in 1961, Guindon came to be involved in a feud with Harold "Johnny Sombrero" Barnes, the self-proclaimed "Supreme Commander" of the Toronto-based Black Diamond Riders. It remains unclear even today why Barnes's nickname was "Johnny Sombrero" as he never wore a Sombrero. Guindon refused to address Barnes by his title of Supreme Commander, causing much offense to the latter. Barnes was the son of a working class Englishman from the north of England and an Italian woman who was related to the Commisso 'Ndrangheta clan. Barnes took more to his British descent and portrayed himself despite being an outlaw biker as the defender of traditional British values against upstart "Frogs" such as Guindon. Barnes in his interviews with the media rather bizarrely claimed that his criminal activities were somehow related to his self-proclaimed mission defending the monarchy and Canada's British heritage. Guindon came to embrace the nickname "Bernie the Frog" as a way of countering the attack and later in life run businesses with names such "Frog's Fresh and Frozen Sea Products".

In 1962, the Satan's Choice club led by Don Norris were forced to disband following attacks from the rival Black Diamond Riders club. The Black Diamond Riders followed this up by attacking the Golden Hawk Riders during a field day in the summer of 1962, beating up the Golden Hawks. Under the outlaw biker code, field days under which bikers show off their motorcycles are supposed to be immune from violence. On the field day at the Pebbestone Golf Course in Courtice hosted by the Golden Hawk Riders, Guindon noticed that the Black Diamond Riders were keeping to themselves and were arming themselves with tree braches, leading him to predict violence was coming. The other Golden Hawk Riders dismissed his concerns, saying that no violence would happen at the field day. At the signal given by Barnes, the Black Diamond Riders attacked. Guindon punched out the sergeant-at-arms of the Black Diamond Riders. Guindon recalled in a 2015 interview: "I started with the sergeant-at-arms and knocked him out, and then Johnny Sombrero chased me down the field with a log. I wasn't going to stand waiting until he hit me. I ran". Guindon came out of the Golden Hawk clubhouse with a piece of lumber and manically attacked the Black Diamond Riders. During the "Battle of Pebblestone" as the fight was called, Guindon came to face to face with Barnes and exchanged blows. Guindon punched out a Black Diamond Rider, Tom Bird, and forced Barnes to retreat. The "Battle of Pebbestone" damaged the prestige of the Golden Hawk Riders, who came to be called the "Chicken Hawks", and Guindon ended up leaving the club. For a time, Guindon went to Montreal to work in a factory to before returning to Oshawa in late 1963.

Guindon was furious with this violation of the biker code by the Black Diamond Riders at the "Battle of Pebblestone" as the media dubbed the brawl and vowed revenge. Guindon, who was considered to be more intelligent than the average outlaw biker, devised a strategy of seeking to humiliate the Black Diamond Riders by amalgamating several outlaw biker clubs into one and forcing the Black Diamond Riders to retreat by confronting them with overwhelming numbers. Guindon knew from his experience of street fights that there was a strength in numbers and the side that had the most fighters always had the advantage. Under the outlaw biker code, cowardice is considered the supreme vice, and for Guindon forcing the Black Diamond Riders to retreat from a fight by confronting them with overwhelming numerical superiority would be far more satisfying than merely beating them up. As part of his strategy, Guindon founded a new club called the Phantom Riders, of which he became president. Guindon founded the Phantom Riders in either late 1963 or early 1964. The Phantom Riders were a successful club who mostly rode British motorcycles such as the Triumphs, Nortons and BSAs. During the early 1960s there had been a short-lived Amalgamated Riders Association, which inspired Guindon with the idea of creating a "super-club" with chapters in several cities that would overwhelm the Black Diamond Riders. The success of the Black Diamond Riders lent urgency and appeal to Guindon's plans, and many of the other club presidents who were also threatened by the Black Diamond Riders were interested.

== Satan's Choice ==
In 1965, Guindon founded the Satan's Choice outlaw biker club in Toronto by merging his Phantom Riders of Oshawa with three other outlaw biker clubs based in what is now Cambridge, Mississauga, and Toronto. The other clubs were the Canadian Lancers of Scarborough (modern Toronto), the Wild Ones of Port Credit (modern Mississauga) and Throttle Twisters of Preston (modern Cambridge). Guindon chose the name Satan's Choice and adopted the patch of the disbanded club because he knew it would enrage the Black Diamond Riders. Guindon had read a newspaper article where Barnes had listed Satan's Choice as one of the clubs which he had forced to disband, which inspired him to choose the name. Guindon asked and received permission from Norris to use the name and patch of Satan's Choice. With four chapters, Satan's Choice became the largest outlaw biker club in Canada, and Guindon became the president of the new club.

With his numerical superiority, Guindon humiliated the Black Diamond Riders by forcing them to retreat from fights that they knew they would lose. To humiliate Barnes, Guindon rode up to the clubhouse of the Black Diamond Riders with his followers. Guindon challenged Barnes and his followers to come out and fight them, causing his prestige to rise and theirs to dwindle when they did not. Guindon followed up his triumph by dictating terms to the Black Diamond Riders, ordering them to stop attacking other clubs and to stick to their territory in Toronto, whose borders were defined by him. The humiliation caused the Black Diamond Riders to lose face and by 1968, what had once been the largest outlaw biker club in Toronto had declined to only 15 members.

The American journalist Mick Lowe described Guindon in the 1960s as: "He was widely respected for his self-discipline, and his athleticism, but was admired in other ways, too. The Choice founder combined courage and a quick intelligence and a keen sense of diplomacy. Bernie always seemed to know how to get things down without ever appearing manipulative. He was a dreamer who would prove time and again his ability to act on and achieve his visions. The young Oshawa biker radiated energy and self-confidence. To be around Bernie Guindon was to feel utterly and irrepressibly alive, living for the moment and yet moving towards some grand and glorious future". For many of the young people in the 1960s, Guindon was a folk hero.

=== First term as national president ===
Later in 1965, Guindon was featured in the documentary Satan's Choice about outlaw bikers directed by Donald Shebib, which made him into something of a celebrity in the Toronto area. Charismatic and handsome, Guindon was the "star" of the documentary. Toronto before the 1960s had a very staid image of "Toronto the Good", a city inhabited by hard-working, conservative God-fearing Protestants of British descent, a city that was prosperous, safe and well run, but rather boring. In the 1960s, many of the younger people in Toronto embraced a "hip" image, consciously choosing lifestyles that were contrary to the traditional Anglo-Protestant values that had previously defined Toronto. The outlaw biker subculture came to be seen as a symbol of rebellion with many of the younger people romanticizing the bikers as a symbol of "authenticity", people who were dangerous, but "cool" and "hip" in their rejection of "Toronto the Good" values. One young woman interviewed in the documentary said she liked riding with Satan's Choice because they were "not phony". The Ontario outlaw biker subculture was violent, but the violence was generally limited to brawling, and murder was extremely rare in the 1960s. The unwillingness of outlaw bikers to testify against one another in court following their code made it difficult for the authorities to prosecute them for their frequent street fights, which contributed to their "cool" image as men who successfully broke the law. Shebib said of Satan's Choice in 1965: "It was a lot of booze, broads, and bikes. It wasn't organized crime as it became. But I don't think you wanted to cross them." Adding to the appeal of Satan's Choice was that the music for the film was performed by The Sparrows, the band that later in 1967 became Steppenwolf.

In Satan's Choice, Guindon and the rest of his club professed to reject materialism, claiming that the only possessions they valued were their motorcycles, and maintained that they were rejecting the conformity of Canadian society. That Guindon and his club were rigidly conforming to the code of outlaw biker subculture that originated in California apparently escaped them. Shebib's documentary Satan's Choice, with its sympathetic picture of Guindon and his gang as rebels against "Toronto the Good" values, gave him an immense amount of attention in 1960s Toronto. Although the values of outlaw biker subculture with its focus on violence, macho masculinity and the acquisition of wealth contrasted with the counterculture values of the hippies, the two subcultures saw themselves as united by a common rejection of the values of Canadian society, and it became common for hippies to glamorize outlaw bikers as the 1960s progressed. Guindon and his gang were often in trouble with the law owing to their frequent brawling with other outlaw bikers, but in general Satan's Choice were not into organized crime in their first three or so years, engaging only in petty crime. Police raids in the 1960s discovered that Satan's Choice members possessed guns, brass knuckles and marijuana, the latter which were as much for their own use as to sell.

The authorities made it clear that they disapproved of Guindon and, starting in late 1966, a police cruiser was almost permanently parked outside of Guindon's home in Oshawa as a way of reminding him that the police were watching him. Visitors to the Guindon home were questioned by the police as they entered and left. In 1967, Guindon was present at a Satan's Choice field day in St. Catharines attended by other biker clubs as well with a total of about 200 people. The anti-riot squad of the Ontario Provincial Police (OPP) showed up in their riot gear and began to advance on the bikers, banging their nightsticks against their shields. Guindon organized a response with a microphone saying: "Be cool, be cool, let 'em come." As the anti-riot squad numbered only 100 while the bikers and their girlfriends numbered about 200, the police phalanx found themselves surrounded on the open field. Realizing that they were in an untenable situation, the police retreated while Guindon ordered the bikers to charge once he saw the police were out of formation. Once out of formation, the anti-riot equipment became a hindrance instead of a help as the policemen were forced to retreat to their cars.

In 1967, a black outlaw biker from Montreal, Rod MacLeod, contacted Guindon at a biker's convention at Wasaga Beach and asked to form the first Satan's Choice chapter in la belle province. Guindon granted the request, making MacLeod the first black chapter president anywhere in Canada, leading in Montreal a multiracial, multilingual chapter made of blacks and whites, English-Canadians and French-Canadians of about 20 members. Outlaw biker clubs tended to shun non-white applicants, and Guindon was highly unusual in allowing a black man to lead a chapter. At the same time, Martin K. Weiche, a German immigrant, Wehrmacht veteran and a fanatical Nazi who had grown rich as a property developer in London, Ontario, tried to recruit Guindon and Satan's Choice to provide security at his Nazi rallies, a request that Guindon rebuffed under the grounds that he was a Canadian "patriot."

On 25 September 1967, Guindon held the first national convention of Satan's Choice at a farmhouse in Markham Township just outside of Toronto, which was also attended by the Vagabonds club. Amid much riotous drinking in a barn, 23 police officers attempted a raid on the Satan's Choice convention about midnight but were forced to retreat under a shower of empty beer bottles. About 4:00 am that night, the police returned with a greater force of 84 officers who, after much brawling, arrested 55 bikers including Guindon and nine women who also attending the party. The raid attracted much media attention, as did the police's seizure of weapons including sawed-off shotguns, handguns, axes and bike chains, together with an immense quantity of alcohol and marijuana. Arrested with Guindon at the barn were his second wife Barbara Ann and his right-hand man Howard "Pigpen" Berry. Much to Guindon's chagrin, the "Wild Thing," as he named his motorcycle, was wrecked by the police.

By 1968, the Toronto chapter of Satan's Choice had about 50 members, making it the largest outlaw biker club in Toronto. In 1968, Guindon was approached by the Hells Angels for the first time with the offer to have Satan's Choice "patch over" to become Hells Angels. Guindon was an ardent Canadian nationalist and rejected the offer, saying he did not want his club absorbed into an American club. Towards the end of the 1960s, Guindon started to move into organised crime, turning Satan's Choice into one of the leading distributors of illegal drugs in Ontario and in Montreal. The drug trade was profitable and a rivalry with the Cross Breeds biker club of Niagara Falls grew increasingly bitter. On 1 June 1968, Guindon led an attack by Satan's Choice members on a Cross Breeds meeting that saw the latter savagely beaten and their motorcycles trashed, an incident that so badly damaged the reputation of the Cross Breeds that the club disbanded. The change of outlaw biking from being a lifestyle to being more of a business caused many of the original Satan's Choice bikers to leave the club in the late 1960s. In August 1968, Guindon attracted national notoriety by holding a bikers' rally in Wasaga Beach that featured a contest that involved having Choice members chase down and run over live chickens with their motorcycles. Under Guindon's leadership, Satan's Choice grew rapidly, opening up chapters all over Ontario and one in Montreal. Guindon had an obsession with "rats," as he called police informers, and most of the victims of his violence were fellow Choice members he suspected of being informers. Guindon continued his womanizing as many women considered him attractive, which amazed him as, by his own admission, his penis was very small. Guidon recalled that it was said by his lovers that he was "hung like a stud field mouse." Guindon explained his sex appeal to women as due to the "bad boy", observing that many women in the 1960s and 1970s were sexually obsessed with outlaw bikers as the ultimate "bad boys," saying: "Maybe they like the wild side. He's not straight up and down like her father was. Who knows?"

The Canadian scholar Gordon Melcher wrote: "In a culture where violence, toughness, and assertive masculinity were so highly prized, Guindon succeeded as a leader because he was tougher and smarter than the next guy." Although Satan's Choice and the other Canadian outlaw biker clubs all slavishly copied the American outlaw biker clubs, Guindon was adamant about keeping American clubs out of Canada, arguing the American clubs would destabilize the biker scene and cause too much violence. Though Guindon was willing to use violence to achieve his aims, in general he was against biker wars, arguing that the Canadian public would tolerate street fights, but not murder, and that excessive violence would lead to a police crackdown. Guindon argued the outlaw biker clubs should respect each other's territories to avoid violence. Melcher wrote there was an element of self-interest to Guindon's strategy since Satan's Choice was the largest club and his strategy for peace by mutual respect for each other's territories enshrined the dominance of his club by preventing challenges. Melcher further noted that as a business strategy, Guindon's peace strategy was quite rational as the lack of a police crackdown allowed Satan's Choice to make greater profits than would be the case if the police were cracking down.

Guindon was described as extremely charismatic and was idolised by his followers. In 1970, Satan's Choice had about 300 members in 12 chapters, making Satan's Choice second largest outlaw biker club in the world, being exceeded only by the Hells Angels. In 1969, the Toronto chapter of Satan's Choice became greedy and unwilling to share the drug trade with two other outlaw biker clubs, the Vagabonds and the Black Diamond Riders. Some of the other Satan's Choice chapters favored a biker war while others were opposed. Faced with a split in his club, Guindon declared that there would be no biker war and threatened to resign if his will was not accepted. The threat of his resignation was such to bring all of the rebellious chapter presidents to accept his decision. Guindon followed up his victory by going to Toronto with his followers to beat up and expel what he called the "fight crazy shitheads" from the Toronto chapter who were causing the trouble with the other clubs. To show that he was not intimidated by the Vagabonds, Guindon publicly challenged their president to a fight atop Mount Hamilton, saying: "Let's you and I get it on and we'll solve the problem." The challenge was declined which made the Vagabonds look cowardly and increased Guindon's reputation.

In October 1968, Guindon was charged with the rape of 15 year old girl in Ottawa although he still claims innocence, maintaining that he thought the girl was 18 years old when he had sex with her. Accordingly, to Guindon's account, the girl liked to hang around the Satan's Choice's Ottawa clubhouse and during his visit to Ottawa, she invited him and several other bikers to the house of a man who also associated with Satan's Choice. Guindon claimed she had engaged in group sex with him and the other bikers and it was the wife of the homeowner who called the police when she arrived home early to discover that her husband had been unfaithful, accusing all of them of rape.

At Guindon's trial for rape in 1969, the girl testified that she had been held against her will over three days at an Ottawa house and had been raped by five men, one of whom was Guindon. On 15 May 1969, he was convicted of sexual assault and sentenced to five years in prison. Lowe wrote that a number of other men would serve as Satan's Choice national president, but "...none of them would ever be as widely acknowledged and respected, and as decisive as Bernie Guindon." Opinion remains divided about Guindon's rape conviction. Edwards, in his sympathetic biography of Guindon, implies that he was framed by the police and prosecutors who had long wanted to put him in prison, noting irregularities such as the fact that the trial transcripts from 1969 have mysteriously disappeared, making it very difficult to assess the evidence that convicted him. Melcher, by contrast, has suggested that Guindon was indeed guilty of rape despite his vehement claims of his innocence, maintaining that the misogynistic tendencies in the outlaw biker subculture strongly encourages violence against women. During Guindon's time in prison, Garnet "Mother" McEwen became the acting national president.

=== First prison term ===
Guindon went to prison to start serving his sentence at the maximum security Kingston Penitentiary. He described Kingston as a harsh prison where prisoners were not allowed to talk to each other unless a guard was present. As Guindon had been convicted of sexual assault against a minor, he was considered to be guilty of a "skin beef" (prison slang for sex crimes against children), making him very unpopular with the other prisoners. Guindon continued to maintain his innocence, claiming he was the victim of a lie told by a jealous wife and refused to go into the special protective wing for sex offenders. Although Guindon was sometimes attacked by other prisoners, he gradually convinced the other inmates that he did not rape a 15-year old. Paul Henry, the prison psychologist at Kingston, said about Guindon: "He was a man's man. There was nothing I didn't like about him. He never needed a psychologist. He was too solid. Rock solid." On 28 November 1969, Guindon learned that he was a father again as one of his girlfriends, Marlene Anne Donovan, whom he knew since his early teens, gave birth to a daughter, Deborah. Guindon started receiving sexually explicit letters from a female university student who he had never met as she became infatuated with him after seeing his photograph in the newspapers, and soon he was having sex with her during conjugal visits. Guindon quickly married her in the Kingston Catholic prison chapel and she gave birth to twins shortly thereafter, one of whom died shortly after being born.

Guindon was transferred to the minimal security Joyceville Institution, where living conditions were easier than in the Kingston prison. In January 1971, Guindon was released from prison on parole for good behavior. He joined his father who was living in Thunder Bay. Between January and July 1971, Guindon won successively the Ontario Golden Gloves, the Eastern Canadian Golden Gloves and Canadian Golden Gloves tournaments. Guindon won a bronze medal in boxing at the 1971 Pan American Games and he was looking forward to boxing for Canada at the 1972 Olympics. However, his rape conviction made it impossible to join the Canadian Olympic team for the 1972 Olympics as he had hoped, as he was declared to be of a bad character. Though Guindon had ambitions of pursuing a professional boxing career, his frequent brawls led to fears on his part that a prosecutor would classify his fists as "deadly weapons", which would increase the penalty if he was convicted of assault. Guindon decided he enjoyed beating people up more than he did professional boxing, and unwilling to give up his life of violence, gave up professional boxing instead. In December 1971, Guindon was sent to prison for violating his parole conditions by associating with Satan's Choice members.

In 1973, while serving his sentence for rape at the maximum security Millhaven Penitentiary, Guindon was interviewed by Arnie Keller of the Toronto Star. Guindon stated that as the Canadian amateur light middleweight boxing champion that he would very much like to box for Canada at the 1976 Olympics, but complained that prison was making it difficult to practice. Guindon stated: "All I can do is hit the heavy bag, do a lot of leg exercises, work with the weights, and do exercises to strength my stomach. There are no ropes which I can use to skip or mirrors to look into to check my style. Nothing resembling a weapon is allowed". Guindon was eligible for parole, but declined to take it as one of the parole conditions was that he could not associate with criminals, saying: "They're the only friends I have. I'm not going to give them up". Despite his rape conviction, the handsome Guindon continued his womanizing ways, being ultimately married four times and fathering between 11 and 16 children (Guindon is not certain how many children he has fathered).

=== Second term as national president ===
By the early 1970s, Satan's Choice had moved into both selling and manufacturing drugs. The two principle drugs manufactured in rural northern Ontario were the "Canadian blue" methamphetamine and PCP. The remoteness of northern Ontario made it possible to hide drug labs and to manufacture drugs on a scale that was difficult in the more populous region of southern Ontario. In the summer of 1974, Guindon was released from prison and moved to Thunder Bay. In 1975, he forged an alliance with the Outlaws biker club, which is very active in the American Midwest. Under the terms of the agreement, the Outlaws were the exclusive distributors in the United States of the PCPs and methamphetamine manufactured by Choice members in northern Ontario.

By 1975, Guindon came to express some nostalgia for "Toronto the Good", noting that Toronto had gone over the course of some twenty odd years, from about 1955 to 1975, from being a city that was once pristine in its cleanliness and puritanical in its morality to becoming a seedy and disreputable place full of alcoholics, prostitutes, and drug addicts. He described Toronto in the 1970s as being a North American version of Bangkok. As Guidnon's rape conviction made it difficult for him to find employment, he worked as the manager of the Venus Spa strip-club on Yonge Street in downtown Toronto. He described the Venus Spa as a decaying, sleazy bar where the paint was peeling off the walls with the only benefit being that his current girlfriend of the moment was working there as a stripper. In April 1975, Guindon won the Ontario boxing championship by defeating Larry Llewellyn. Guindon's boxing background led to only use his fists in fights as he never engaged in kicking, which he considers to be an unmanly form of fighting. His love of boxing made him disdainful of the Asian martial arts such as karate, which led Guindon to engage in a fight for the benefit of other Choice members with Alain Templain, the president of the Oshawa chapter of Satan' Choice. Templain who held a black belt in karate, and the fight was intended to reveal which fighting style was the superior one. Guindon took his victory over Templain as confirming for him the superiority of boxing over karate.

Guindon came into conflict with one of his subordinates, Garnet McEwen, the president of the Choice's St. Catharine's chapter, who favored "Yankeeization", wanting closer ties with the Outlaws. McEwen seemed to have an inferiority complex towards Americans as he was convinced that he would only become a truly important man when he joined a well known American club such as the Outlaws. Guindon remained very popular with his followers and overshadowed McEwen. One Satan's Choice member, Gennaro Raso recalled in an interview: "I met Bernie in the early 1970s. I always looked up to him. I thought he was a cool guy, a very smart man. Bernie's Bernie. Bernie doesn't take shit from anybody...He didn't have to carry a gun. It was different back then". Despite Guindon's dislike of biker wars, the Montreal chapter of Satan's Choice became involved in a conflict with the Popeyes, the most violent of Quebec's many outlaw biker clubs. The Popeyes placed a contract on Guindon's life. At the same time, McEwen, who was also a police informer, was scheming to have Guindon imprisoned in order to allow him to serve as Satan's Choice interim national president again.

In August 1975, Guindon visited a hunting lodge at Oba Lake in northern Ontario owned by Templain. The lodge was so remote as to be only accessible by plane. Also staying at the lodge were a group of undercover detectives from the Ontario Provincial Police posing as American tourists looking for a "good time" in Canada. McEwen informed the OPP of the PCP factory and when it was that Guindon would be visiting Oba Lake so they could arrest him. Guindon rarely visited Templain's Oba lake lodge, and it was no accident that a group of undercover policemen were present at the Oba lake lodge during one of Guindon's infrequent visits.

On 6 August 1975, the undercover officers raided a snack-bar located on an island in the lake and found Guindon and Templain with some PCP tablets worth $6 million Canadian dollars together with PCP-manufacturing equipment. Found on the island on Oba Lake were nine pounds of PCP ready to sell and 236 pounds of PCP waiting to be completed. The drug network for selling the PCP ranged as far as Florida and the police estimated Guindon was making at least $60 million per month in sales. McEwen, who had long wanted to push Guindon out of the way to pursue "Yankeeization", had informed the police about the drug operation at Oba Lake and when Guindon would be visiting so that the police could arrest him.

After his arrest, Guindon was visited in the Sault Ste. Marie jail by two Satan's Choice members, Cecil Kirby and Frank Lenti. Kirby felt he was owned money by Guindon and ended up leaving Satan's Choice to become a bomber and a hitman for the Mafia. In May 1976, Guindon and Templain were convicted of conspiracy to manufacture and sell drugs and were sentenced to 17 years in prison each. Guindon served his sentence at Millhaven Institution.

=== Second prison term ===
During his second prison term, Satan's Choice began to fall apart and on 1 July 1977 several Satan's Choice's chapters "patched over" to join the Outlaws. The charismatic Guindon proved to be the principal focal point of Satan's Choice, and with his prolonged absence the club became plagued by infighting between the chapter presidents. The way his supposed allies, the Outlaws, poached several chapters away from him while he was in prison caused Guindon to have a lasting grudge against the Outlaws. In 1977, Guindon was described in media reports as being furious with Garnet McEwen, the man he appointed as interim national president, for having engineered the "patch over". From within the Millhaven prison, Guindon placed a bounty on McEwen, promising to pay $10,000 as the reward for killing McEwen. Guindon spent hours punching his bed in fury as he wished his bed was McEwen. Guindon later stated about McEwen: "I couldn't do anything about it. Fuck was I mad. Especially at him [McEwen]. Stool pigeon motherfucker". Satan's Choice lost the chapters in Montreal, Hamilton, St. Catharines, Sault Ste. Marie, Windsor, London, Ottawa, and Kingston to the Outlaws. When Guindon was released early from prison for good behavior in 1984, all Satan's Choice had left were the chapters in Thunder Bay, Kitchener, Oshawa, and Toronto.

During his second prison sentence, Guindon used LSD heavily, later saying "I only did it in jail. I never did it on the street. I used to go on my own vacation so to speak. Go on a holiday. Take a trip. I probably did more drugs in two months in the joint than I ever did on the street". In May 1979, Guindon was sent to Joyceville Institute, where he learned leather work, a trade that he excelled at. His interest in learning a skill was as a way of improving his chances of obtaining parole. Guindon made himself popular with the other prisoners with his super-sized "Frog Log" marijuana cigarettes that he rolled with the cannabis being supplied by corrupt prison guards he had been bribed to smuggle in the marijuana.

=== Third term as national president ===
On 19 November 1984, Guindon was released on parole and, despite his parole conditions, resumed his association with his club. Blais greeted his release by picking him up in a limo while she gave him the gift of a bottle of champagne and a green cake shaped like a frog. Guindon went to Windsor to beat up Bill Hulko, the former president of the Choice chapter who had gone over to the Outlaws in 1977. Putting his boxing skills to good use, Guindon recalled: "I soaked him right in the fucking head...He did nothing...I just wanted to see where his balls were. He didn't have his balls that fucking day". Guindon started dating a teenage stripper known by her stage name "Angel" because it was said that she had a heavenly body. On 15 October 1985, "Angel" gave birth to Guindon's only son, Harley Davidson Guindon. Between 1985 and 1988, Guindon opened up four new chapters in Ontario, adding about 95 new members. In February 1985, Guindon was called by George Chuvalo who asked for his help regarding his troubled son, Jesse, who had issues with drug addiction. On 18 February 1985, Jesse Chuvalo committed suicide by shooting himself in the head. Over the next several months, Guindon provided emotional support for Chuvalo who was deeply depressed by his son's suicide.

By the 1980s, Satan's Choice had moved into selling cocaine and a pipeline was opened to move cocaine from Toronto to Alberta, where many oil workers used cocaine to ease the tedium of their jobs. Guindon remained close to a number of other gangster-boxers such as Eddie Melo and Howard "Baldy" Chard, the chief enforcer for Johnny Papalia of Hamilton. Guindon's teenage daughter Shannan found it difficult to be his child as she complained that nearly everyone in south Oshawa seemed to have some story about her father. A particular issue for Shannan was the large number of women she kept meeting who –unaware of her paternity – proudly talked about having "wild sex" with her father. Shannan Guindon ultimately felt the need to leave Oshawa to stop living in her father's shadow. Guindon tried his hand at a number of legitimate occupations such as manufacturing custom-built motorcycles and leatherwork. Guindon was a perfectionist when it came to custom building, and found that most people were unwilling to pay for his expensive services whether it be with leather wallets or motorcycles, as consumers preferred to buy the cheaper items manufactured in factories. Guindon complained that the quality of Satan's Choice bikers in the 1980s had vastly declined since the 1970s and 1960s, saying that Satan's Choice needed more members like Lorne Campbell, the president of the Oshawa chapter, and David Hoffman, the treasurer of the Kitchener chapter, who felt had the necessary "balls" to live up to his standards of toughness. Guindon claimed that if Satan's Choice had more members such as Hoffman and Campbell and fewer such as McEwen, it would still been the largest biker gang in Canada.

In 1988, Lowe described Guindon as living in a middle-class neighborhood of Oshawa and engaged in real estate speculation while also owning a camp in northern Ontario for outlaw bikers. Lowe also described Guindon as still proud of Satan's Choice with his body covered with tattoos of Satan's Choice grinning devil patch. In the summer of 1989, Guindon, with his right-hand man Lorne Campbell, made a lengthy visit to the Prairie provinces to make alliances with los Bravos gang of Winnipeg and the Grim Reapers of Calgary and Lethbridge. A report by the police Organized Crime Committee from 1989 stated that Satan's Choice, the Vagabonds, and the Lobos were working closely to manufacture and distribute methamphetamine. In the winter of 1990, Guindon and Campbell visited Sorel, Quebec to meet the leaders of the Hells Angels to discuss an alliance against the Outlaws. By this time, Guindon had been speaking English for so long that his French had become somewhat rusty as he found himself pausing as he searched in his mind for the right words and phrases in French when asking for directions. Guindon removed his son from the care of his former girlfriend "Angel" in 1990 because of her substance abuse, and chose to raise him along with another of his girlfriends. Guindon spent much of the 1990s feuding with the teachers at the Holy Cross Elementary School who believed that the Guindon family were devil-worshippers and that Harley should not be allowed to attend a Catholic school. Harley Guindon recalled that his childhood was different from the other children as he once he was getting off a school bus when he saw somebody run up with an ax intent upon beheading his father in front of their house. Harley Guidnon stated: "I can remember this as clear as day. The guy was ready to cut his head off and he slid like a boxer, throwing out a job, and knocked the attacker out cold upon the lawn".

In April 1992, Guindon was charged with drug trafficking as part of Project Overhaul. In July 1994, his trial ended with his acquittal. In September 1992, Guindon renewed his feud with Barnes and the Black Diamond Riders who were attempting to set up a chapter in Sudbury. Guindon was enraged when he heard that Barnes had beaten up a Satan's Choice biker on the streets of Sudbury and stolen his gang "colors", leading him to lead a force of Satan's Choice bikers north to Sudbury to personally avenge the insult. At a brawl in the parking lot of the Sorrento Motor Hotel that came to be known in biker circles as the "Sudbury Saturday Night", Guindon led 45 Satan's Choice bikers against Barnes and 7 Black Diamond Riders, all of whom were beaten so badly that they had to be hospitalized. Guindon considered the "Sudbury Saturday Night" brawl to be revenge for the "Battle of Pebblestone" as he argued that Barnes had not fought fair during at the brawl at the Pebblestone Golf Course 30 years earlier, which justified not fighting fair at the brawl in Sudbury.

Guindon, whose Canadian nationalism was described as "almost a mania", repeatedly turned down offers all through the 1990s made by Hells Angels' national president Walter Stadnick to have Satan's Choice "patch over" to the Hells Angels. The Canadian journalist Yves Lavigne wrote that Stadnick was interested in Satan's Choice not only because it was the second largest biker gang in Ontario, but because "its legendary founder" Guindon had "charisma and the ability to charm the skin off a snake. Stadnick did not want to waste his time wooing somebody without power. What Bernie said, people did. Guindon repeatedly turned Stadnick's offers to have the Satan's Choice join the Hells Angels, saying he wanted to keep his club Canadian, finally leading to Stadnick to sever contact with him in 1993.

In summer 1995, Satan's Choice became involved in a biker war with the Loners, another outlaw biker club founded by former Choice member Frank Lenti who, as the leader of the Diabos, was now allied with the Choice against his former club. The use of rocket launchers to attack each other's clubhouses led to an attempt by the mayor of Toronto, Barbara Hall, to ban all outlaw bikers from Toronto, an attempt defeated in the courts by the lawyers for Satan's Choice who argued that Hall's proposed ban violated the Charter of Rights and Freedoms. In the 1990s, Guindon worked as an extra playing a thug in various Hollywood films and television shows shot in the Toronto area such as My Date with the President's Daughter, Jungle Movie, Blues Brothers 2000' and Kung Fu: The Legend Continues.

By the late 1990s Guindon was starting to suffer from brain damage caused by his boxing career and power began to slip from his hands. Increasingly, Satan's Choice came to dominated by Andre Wateel, the president of the Choice's Kitchener chapter, who was in favor of joining the Hells Angels. Wateel started to spend more and more time talking to Stadnick. In May 1996, the OPP launched Project Dismantle, charging 161 people associated with Satan's Choice with 1,192 violations of the criminal code, mostly relating to narcotics, while seizing drugs with a street value of $1.05 million as well as two marijuana labs capable of producing crops with an annual yield of $13.8 million. In 1996, Guidon retired as national president, handing over power to Wateel. Between 28 and 30 June 1996, a retirement party for Guindon was held at a farm outside of Port Perry with the guest of honor being his long-time deputy Lorne Campbell. Also attending the party was Guindon's former wife Blais and her new husband Grant. In his retirement speech, Guindon announced he was stepping down to spend more time with his son Harley.

Guindon, however, remained a member of the Oshawa chapter. In September 1999 another member of the Oshawa chapter, William "Mr. Bill" Lavoie, sponsored Steven Gault as a member. Guindon took a strong dislike to Gault, saying in an interview: "He had a cocky attitude. That's what I got from him. I always had a gut feeling about him. The questions he'd be asking me. You always had to be careful how you answered him." Guindon would have disliked Gault more had he known that he was a police informer who only joined Satan's Choice with the aim of selling their secrets to his police contacts.

== Hells Angels and retirement ==
On 29 December 2000, Guindon and the rest of Satan's Choice went to Montreal to join the Hells Angels. Regarding his decision to join the Angels despite frequently saying he wanted to remain a member of an all-Canadian club, Guindon stated in 2012: "We had to follow. We had no other alternative in a sense. You are trying to keep your guys together. It was sad, but like everything else, it's progress. You think you're moving in the right direction, but in a sense you're not because you're taking on somebody else's battle." Guindon argued that since the Hells Angels were going to come to Ontario anyhow, it was better to have Satan's Choice join the Angels to avoid violence. Guindon maintained he joined the Hells Angels in 2000 because he knew that his prestige would ensure that all of Satan's Choice would join the Angels. Guindon stated that he knew some members of Satan's Choice were not keen about "patching over" and those members would likely be the victims of violence if they remained with Satan's Choice, arguing his motives for joining the Angels was to spare those members from being killed by having all of Satan's Choice join the Hells Angels.

Guindon was a member of the Hells Angels before retiring from outlaw biking. In October 2003, he was somehow able to cross the American border despite his criminal record and attended as a guest of honor the 65th birthday of Sonny Barger, the Hells Angels international president. Barger had long wanted to meet Guindon, having first proposed a meeting in 1968, and Guindon's presence at the birthday party held on 13 October 2003 had been specifically requested by him. Guindon was not impressed with Barger, whom he regarded as an arrogant and overbearing, and left the birthday early by riding out into the Arizona desert. Guindon later stated he felt happier in the solitude of the desert rather than he did in the company of Barger, his obnoxious bodyguards and too many sycophantic Hells Angels who were hoping for a promotion.

Guindon accused another Hells Angel, Steven Gault, of being a police informer, which led to tensions between the two; ultimately it emerged that Gault was indeed a police informer who was paid $1 million by the Ontario government for his work. In April 2006, Gault unexpectedly arrived at Guindon's house one evening with a vague offer to pay him $5,000 in exchange for some unspecified work that Gault had planned. Guindon recalled: "He promised me five thousand dollars a month and I said no. I didn't know what he meant by 'work with him'. I just knew it would mean trouble. Distrusting Gault, whom he believed was setting up him for something, Guindon decided to retire from the Hells Angels the next day. Guindon handed in his jacket with the Hells Angel patch, which Gault as the Oshawa chapter's treasurer burned to signify that Guindon was now out of the club and Guindon was given a ring to show that he left the Hells Angels in good standing, or "out good." Guindon's mother, scarred by years of domestic abuse by his father, was opposed to him leaving the Hells Angels, believing that his membership was the best way of protecting herself against being hurt again. Despite his mother's protests, he stuck with his decision to leave, arguing that he had already been to prison twice and that as long as Gault was his chapter's treasurer it was likely that he would get a third prison sentence. On 30 March 2008, Guindon's house in Oshawa was burned down in a case of arson. Guindon had just sold the house and had cancelled his insurance, causing him to take a loss on the items consumed in the fire. More damagingly, Guindon did not believe in keeping his money in a bank, and all of his wealth in the form of cash which he had hidden inside of his house was also devoured by the flames, costing him millions. On 11 September 2009, he finally married Blais whom he had living with for a number of years.

Guindon's son, Harley Davidson Guindon, followed his father into the outlaw biker subculture becoming a Hells Angel and, like his father, served a prison sentence at Millhaven between 2007 and 2011. In 2005, Guindon fils was arrested as part of the OPP's Project Superman and was charged with sexual assault with a weapon, extortion using a gun, assault with a weapon, forcible confinement, assault causing bodily harm, and aggravated assault. Guindon founded and remains the honorary chairman of the Ontario Confederation of Clubs (OCC), a lobby group for motorcycle enthusiasts. In January 2010, the OCC added a number of new clubs such as the Cinco Chagas, 55 V-Twin Cruisers, the Iron Horse, the Iron Dragons, and the Messiahs Creed as members. In 2010, Guindon was reported to be looking for a ghostwriter to write his autobiography, which he wanted to entitle From Satan to an Angel: Your Side, My Side and the Truth. In 2012, Guindon had ended his long-time feud with Barnes who was still the president of the Black Diamond Riders, which had maintained a shadowy existence since Guindon had defeated Barnes in a biker war in the 1960s. Guindon met Barnes by chance at an antiques show in the Kawartha Lakes region in the summer of 2012 and embraced his old enemy saying that their feud which had started 50 years earlier with the "Battle of Pebblestone" was now over. Guindon often socialized with Barnes in his last years as he stated that his former archenemy became a close friend. In a television interview in 2013, Guindon criticized the Hells Angels, saying that in the mass "patch-over" in 2000 that the Hells Angels had taken over a number of "Mickey Mouse clubs" and some of the bikers taken in such as Gault were police informers. In response, Guindon was declared to be "out bad" with the Hells Angels, meaning he was a former member whom the Hells Angels were forbidden to speak to. In November 2016, Guindon attended Barnes's funeral in Toronto following Barnes's death from a heart attack, aged 81, paying respects to his old enemy turned friend.

Peter Edwards, the crime correspondent for the Toronto Star, published a biography in 2013 of Lorne Campbell, a Satan's Choice turned Hells Angel biker. While researching the book, Edwards met Guindon and agreed to write his biography. In 2017, Edwards described Guindon as: "He's a very human person. And if I was at war, Bernie's the guy I'd want sitting next to me." Most recently, Guindon's name has been mentioned in the news relating to the rape and murder of his 18-year old granddaughter Rori Hache in 2017. The media has reported rumors in the prisons that Guindon has placed a bounty for a "jailhouse hit" on Adam Strong, the man charged with rape and murder of Hache, with one former prisoner saying: "You can't kill the granddaughter of somebody connected to the Hells Angels. It all gets down to that. You can't kill a biker's granddaughter and get away with it." On 16 March 2021, Strong was convicted of murdering Hache. Guindon is at present living in Oshawa with Blais.
