= First Montreal biker war =

Gang war in Quebec between the Satan's Choice and the Popeye Moto Club

Satan's Choice–Popeyes War
- Part of organized crime in Canada
- Date: 1974–1976
- Location: Quebec, Canada
- Caused by: Narcotics trade and territorial dispute
- Result: Stalemate

Parties
Satan's Choice MC; Devils Disciples MC Support: Outlaws MC; West End Gang	Popeye MC; Dubois Brothers Support: Hells Angels MC

Lead figures
Bernie Guindon; Garnet McEwen; Cecil Kirby; Rod MacLeod	Yves Buteau; Yves Trudeau; Yvon Bilodeau; Gros Boule

Casualties
- Deaths: 20
- Injuries: 30+
- Arrested: 50

The Satan's Choice–Popeyes War was the first major outlaw motorcycle club conflict in Canada's history, involving the country's two largest Motorcycle Clubs; the Satan's Choice from Ontario, and the Popeyes from Quebec. The conflict lasted from 1974 until 1976 and saw the two motorcycle clubs battle for dominance in the country. The conflict misleadingly known in Canada as the "First Biker War" would begin a year later in 1977.

== Prelude ==
This conflict would set the stage for the First Biker War, the war involved Satan's Choice Motorcycle Club and the Popeye Moto Club, Canada's largest biker clubs at the time engaging one another. Support for the conflict was divided between the Hells Angels and the Outlaws as they each backed their respective allies and prepared for their expansion north. Notorious Quebecois biker and hitman Yves Trudeau would establish himself during this conflict as one of Canada's most dangerous criminals.

In 1974, Cecil Kirby and Garnet "Mother" McEwen, the president of the Satan's Choice St. Catharines chapter, travelled to Fort Lauderdale, Florida to meet with senior members of the Outlaws. McEwen became especially close to the Outlaws and was the most vocal advocate within Satan's Choice of closer ties with the American club. Satan's Choice leader Bernie Guindon ultimately forged an alliance with the Outlaws in June 1975. Under the terms of the agreement in early 1975, the Outlaws were the exclusive distributors in the United States of the PCP and methamphetamine manufactured by Satan's Choice members in northern Ontario. "Canadian Blue" methamphetamine produced in northern Ontario could be sold for $8,000 in Canada per pound, but in the United States saw a significant increase in sale price and was sold for $12,000 U.S. dollars per pound. As manufacturing methamphetamine produces a very unpleasant smell that is usually compared to the smell of cat urine, northern Ontario with its sparse population, numerous lakes and vast forests was ideal for manufacturing methamphetamine. The Outlaws, who controlled the markets of the Midwest, came to be dependent upon methamphetamine manufactured by Satan's Choice, making them a firm ally.

Satan's Choice gained access to a larger support network of clubs throughout the United States and beyond, opening the club to new business opportunities and possibly even reinforcements in the event of another club war. Meanwhile, the Outlaws gained a strong ally in Ontario, precluding any expansion by the Hells Angels into the region. Furthermore, the Outlaws gained a way to challenge the supremacy of the Hells Angels in Quebec through access to the Montreal chapter of Satan's Choice. This led the Montreal chapter and their allies, the Devils Disciples, into open conflict with the Hells Angels-backed Popeyes in 1974; the Hells Angels began to plan for an expansion north and had begun scouting the Popeyes. The Popeyes were regarded to be the most violent outlaw biker club in Quebec, and were notorious for engaging in gratuitous and sadistic violence, which is part of the reason why they were later chosen by the Hells Angels for recruitment. They had the reputation for being the most prosperous and the most violent motorcycle club in Montreal.

== Conflict ==
Satan's Choice's expansion into Quebec began in 1967 establishing a chapter in Montreal and aligned itself with the long time Popeye rivals, the Devil's Disciples. These moves caused tension with Quebec's largest motorcycle club, the Popeyes, who believed Quebec was their territory. At their peak around 1970, Satan's Choice membership reached over 400 with 13 chapters in Ontario and Quebec, at this point it was the second largest Motorcycle Club in the world behind only the Hells Angels. The Popeye Moto Club at its peak strength had around 350 members with 7 chapters in Quebec.

The longtime rivals of the Popeyes, the Devils' Disciples had aligned itself with the Montreal chapter of Satan's Choice who were engaged in the manufacturing and smuggling of chemical narcotics in Montreal, a market that the Popeyes decided to violently enter in 1974, leading to the biker war. After the Popeyes went after the Devil's Disciples. Howard "Pigpen" Berry, an enforcer for Satan's Choice, opened fire on the clubhouse of the Popeyes Motorcycle Club with a sawed-off Lee–Enfield .303 bolt action rifle with a ten-round clip. Multiple brawls and assaults occurred between the two groups resulting in multiple injuries on both sides, including a member of the Satan's Choice who was shot but survived. As the conflict heated up other organized crime groups in the province would be pulled in. The Irish Canadian West End Gang would enter on the side of Satan's Choice while the Dubois Brothers gang backed the Popeyes. Yves Trudeau, the ace assassin for the Popeyes first rose to prominence during this struggle, killing several Devils Disciples.

The Popeyes, who acted as "muscle" for the Dubois brothers, fearing a full onslaught from the Satan's Choice chapters of Ontario, the Popeyes mostly targeted its ally, the Devil's Disciples and had killed 15 members of the club between 1974 and 1976 with 4 members of the Popeyes dying as well, these events caused the Devil's Disciples gang to disband themselves in January 1976.A crackdown by Police on both groups, plus the destruction of the Devil's Disciples and the arrest of the Dubois Brothers led to the end of the conflict.

== Aftermath ==
Although Satan's Choice had managed to gain territory and damage the Popeyes, raids in Ontario dealt blows to the club during the conflict while an allied club, the Devil's Disciples, disbanded in 1976 after heavy casualties. The Popeyes earned rights to distribute narcotics in its Montreal territory until the Dubois brothers were arrested and the club was cut off from its largest supplier of drugs. The two clubs' weakened status enabled the 1977 entry into Canada of the Hells Angels and the Outlaws Motorcycle Club and the beginning of the First Biker War.

== See also ==
- List of outlaw motorcycle club conflicts
