= Michel Langlois (biker) =

Canadian outlaw biker and gangster (born 1946)

- Born: 2 July 1946 (age 80); Saint-André-Avellin, Quebec, Canada
- Other name: "Sky"
- Occupations: Outlaw biker; crime boss
- Known for: National president of the Hells Angels in Canada
- Predecessor: Yves Buteau
- Successor: Walter Stadnick
- Allegiance: Popeye MC (1964–1977); Hells Angels MC (1977–)
- Convictions: Accessory to murder (1988); Drug trafficking (1999) Conspiracy to commit murder (2015); Drug trafficking and gangsterism (2018)
- Penalty: 2 years' imprisonment (1988); 5 years' imprisonment and $228,000 fine (1999); 9 months' imprisonment (2015); 4 years and 8 months' imprisonment (2018)

Michel "Sky" Langlois (born 2 July 1946) is a Canadian outlaw biker and gangster who served as the second national president of the Hells Angels Motorcycle Club in Canada. A founding member of the Popeyes biker gang, which amalgamated with the Hells Angels in 1977, Langlois was convicted as an accessory to murder in the club's internal Lennoxville massacre of 1985, and later of conspiracy to commit murder for his role in the 1994–2002 Quebec Biker War.

== Popeyes ==
Born in Saint-André-Avellin, Langlois worked on a farm in rural Quebec as a teenager before he moved to Montreal. He received the sobriquet "Sky" because he possessed a pilot's license and owned an aircraft. Langlois formed the Popeye Moto Club with Roger Calve and approximately half a dozen other founding members in 1964. The club grew rapidly and, by 1970, consisted of seven chapters throughout the province. The Popeyes began a criminal association with the Dubois brothers in the early 1970s, initially working as assassins and later as drug dealers for the gang. Additionally, club members were retained as contract killers for the Montreal Mafia. The Popeyes were considered to be the most violent of the 350 outlaw biker clubs in Quebec, and were infamous for engaging in gratuitous and sadistic violence that attracted the attention of the Hells Angels.

The Popeyes violently entered the business of manufacturing and smuggling chemical drugs in 1974, resulting in a biker war with the Devil's Disciples motorcycle gang, which was considered the most powerful outlaw biker club in Montreal, and the Montreal chapter of Satan's Choice, which had expanded into Quebec from Ontario in 1967. While the Dubois brothers backed the Popeyes in the conflict, the Irish-Canadian West End Gang was drawn in on the side of Satan's Choice. By January 1976, fifteen of the Devil's Disciples had been killed by the Popeyes, causing the gang to disband. The Popeyes ultimately won control of the area around Saint Henri Square, although the arrests of the Dubois brothers cut the club off from their largest supplier of drugs. The West End Gang subsequently became the Popeyes' primary source of narcotics.

A number of Satan's Choice chapters, including the Montreal faction, "patched over" to join the Outlaws – the second largest outlaw biker club in the United States after the Hells Angels – on 1 July 1977. The Popeyes, having been scouted by Hells Angels leader Sonny Barger and now carrying the reputation as Quebec's strongest motorcycle gang, became the Angels' first chapter in Canada on 5 December 1977.

== Hells Angels ==
=== Lennoxville massacre ===
As the Hells Angels in Quebec continued to grow, the Montreal chapter was divided into two separate factions on 14 September 1979; the Montreal North chapter headquartered in Laval, and the Montreal South chapter based in Sorel. The North chapter, which was headed by Yves "Le Boss" Buteau, consisted mostly of former Popeye members and still retained Popeye attitudes, in marked contrast to the South chapter led by Réjean "Zig Zag" Lessard, which was made up of bikers who joined the Hells Angels after 1977 and were more disciplined. The Laval group would become known for its violent and reckless behaviour, and excessive drug use. Between 1978 and 1984, the Hells Angels and the Outlaws engaged in a conflict for supremacy in Quebec. Following the assassination of Buteau by an Outlaws member on 8 September 1983, Langlois succeeded him as the Hells Angels' national president, while Lessard continued to lead the Montreal South chapter. As national president, he oversaw Laval, Sorel, and three additional chapters that were founded on the British Columbia Coast in July 1983. In a division of labour, Langlois focused his efforts into expanding into other areas of Canada, while Lessard had effective operational control of the club in Quebec. The Hells Angels ultimately vanquished the Outlaws from the province, with the Outlaws retreating into their Ontario stronghold, and the Angels consolidating their criminal activities and expanding into the port cities Halifax and Vancouver.

Laurent "L'Anglais" Viau, who superseded Buteau as president of the Montreal North chapter, had a more tolerant attitude towards violence and drug use than his predecessor. The Laval chapter, which had often chafed at and had broken Buteau's rules about not using drugs, quickly spun out of control under Viau's leadership as Viau himself abused cocaine and alcohol. As the North chapter was allegedly skimming drug profits that were meant for other chapters, and putting the entire Hells Angels operation in Quebec at risk due to their frequent arrests for minor offences, the chapter was declared to be in "bad standing" with the club at a secret meeting in Sorel in March 1985 and were hence to be killed. Langlois played a passive role in the subsequent liquidation of the North chapter, which was orchestrated by Lessard along with Halifax chapter president David "Wolf" Carroll and Sherbrooke chapter president Georges "Bo-Boy" Beaulieu. On 24 March 1985, five members of the North chapter were ambushed and shot dead at the Sherbrooke chapter clubhouse in an event termed the Lennoxville massacre. Langlois assisted in cleaning up the aftermath of the killings, and helped get rid of the victims' personal effects. The bodies of the five dead bikers were ultimately disposed of in the St. Lawrence River.

Langlois was arrested in Montreal in relation to the massacre on 2 July 1985, his 39th birthday. One of 29 defendants in the case, he was released pending trial, and subsequently became a fugitive. On 22 February 1986, police attempted to apprehend Langlois at a Hells Angels motorcycle rally held at the Palais des congrès de Montréal, where he had rented space for a number of exhibition booths, but by then he had already fled Canada. Walter "Nurget" Stadnick was chosen to be Langlois' successor as the Hells Angels' Canadian president. After living in exile in Morocco for two years, Langlois and two other Hells Angels, René "Canisse" Hébert and Guy "Junior" Auclair, surrendered to authorities at the Sûreté du Québec headquarters in Sherbrooke on 13 April 1988. He pleaded guilty to being an accessory to murder, and was sentenced to two years' imprisonment. This was Langlois' second federal prison term.

=== Quebec Biker War ===
The Hells Angels were severely weakened by the annihilation of their Montreal North chapter and the subsequent indictments. As a result of the Lennoxville purge, the club also became reviled by certain individuals in the Quebec biker scene, who considered the massacre an unforgivable breach of the outlaw code. Rather than joining the Angels, the brothers Giovanni and Salvatore Cazzetta formed their own club, the Rock Machine, which quickly expanded and, by the early 1990s, controlled a significant portion of Montreal's lucrative drug trade. When the Hells Angels attempted to dislodge the Rock Machine and their allies from the drug market, the Rock Machine retaliated by launching a series of attacks against the Hells Angels on 13 July 1994. On 15 July, senior Hells Angels from across Quebec were summoned by the Montreal chapter to an emergency meeting to vote on whether or not to retaliate against the Rock Machine. According to Sherbrooke Hells Angel-turned-Crown witness Sylvain Boulanger, the Montreal, Trois-Rivières and Quebec City chapters – Langlois and Maurice "Mom" Boucher of the Montreal faction, and Quebec City chapter vice-president Marc "Tom" Pelletier in particular – were strongly in favour, while only the Sherbrooke chapter leaders were against retaliation against their rivals. Despite Sherbrooke's initial holdout, the chapter eventually relented in October 1994, providing the Hells Angels' leadership the unanimous vote required to go to war against the Rock Machine. The resulting Quebec Biker War remains the deadliest organized crime conflict in Canadian history. Langlois and Boucher subsequently emerged as the Angels' most prominent leaders in Quebec during the biker war.

On 1 March 1997, in the midst of the war against the Rock Machine, Langlois, along with seven other members and two prospects, left the Montreal chapter to form the South Shore chapter, based in Saint-Basile-le-Grand. As no members of the chapter had any criminal convictions within the previous five years, the chapter was able to avoid being classified under federal legislation as a criminal organization.

=== Cocaine trafficking conviction ===
An associate of Langlois, Robert Savard, was arrested in possession of 178 kilograms of cocaine, concealed in the walls of a trailer, while crossing the Canada–United States border at Lacolle on 14 January 1998. The drugs, valued at $71 million, were sourced in Mexico and were intended to be distributed in Montreal. Savard was detained as a result of intelligence provided by a confidential informer who had infiltrated the trafficking network, and he was later sentenced to seven and a half years in prison.

Langlois was apprehended by the Wolverine anti-gang squad – composed of members of the Sûreté du Québec and the Royal Canadian Mounted Police (RCMP) – at his home in Longueuil on 14 October 1998 and charged with importing and conspiring to import the seized drug shipment. A fortified compound in Saint-Basile-le-Grand and a motorcycle shop owned by Langlois in Longueuil were also raided by police. In the hope of convincing the judge to grant Langlois bail, his lawyer presented the court with four witnesses, including Langlois' girlfriend Micheline Blanchard, who was the girlfriend of Yves Buteau before he was murdered in 1983. Blanchard described Langlois as a good father, and offered to put up their $186,000 family home in Longueuil as security.

A total of seven people were indicted in connection with the cocaine shipment. An alleged accomplice of Langlois in the drug ring, Genevieve Dubois, was found shot to death in a forest in Saint-Hubert on 12 February 1999. Police suspect that she was a drug courier for the Hells Angels, and that she was murdered by the bikers because they feared she would cooperate with law enforcement authorities and testify against Langlois.

Through the efforts of the informer in the drug ring, police discovered that Langlois had allegedly bankrolled 15% of the operation. The rest of the funds were provided by a man referred to by Langlois as Le Grand Manitou. On 9 July 1999, Langlois was convicted of drug trafficking, sentenced to five years' imprisonment, and ordered to pay $22,000 in restitution.

=== Operation SharQc ===
Following his release from prison, Langlois stepped down from his role as a senior member in the Quebec Hells Angels, although he did continue to represent the club abroad by attending motorcycle rallies in Portugal, South Africa and the Dominican Republic between 2007 and 2009. He returned to his hometown of Saint-André-Avellin, buying a 53-acre maple tree farm, and producing his own brand of maple syrup. On 15 April 2009, however, Langlois was among 156 people indicted as a result of Operation SharQc, a three-year Sûreté du Québec investigation aimed at almost the entire membership of the Hells Angels' five chapters in the province. A search of Langlois' home uncovered 47 pages of handwritten notes containing names and numbers of Hells Angels members in Quebec, as well as addresses of bikers in Western Canada and Texas, and $33,500 in cash.

He and seventeen co-accused admitted that they had played a role in the Hells Angels' most violent period in Quebec, the years of the biker war between 1994 and 2002, and pleaded guilty on 16 March 2015 to general conspiracy to commit murder. Langlois was sentenced to a nine-month prison term in addition to time served. He was released from custody in September 2015.

=== Subsequent activity ===
In April 2018, Langlois was arrested as a result of Project Objection, an investigation led by the Sûreté du Québec's Escouade nationale de répression contre le crime organisé (ENCRO) which revealed that he and other senior Hells Angels in Quebec controlled drug networks in specific locations across the province. In a meeting to discuss the distribution of drugs in the Outaouais region, at a restaurant on Drummoind Street in downtown Montreal on 9 August 2017, Langlois claimed to an undercover agent to have title over drug trafficking in Petite Nation, a regional county municipality. He was a partner in the distribution of nearly 300,000 methamphetamine pills and several kilograms of hashish between 2017 and 2018. Langlois was sentenced to 58 months' imprisonment after pleading guilty to charges of drug trafficking, conspiracy and gangsterism on 3 October 2018. In September 2020, the Parole Board of Canada denied Langlois' request for parole, in part because he continued to meet with organized crime figures while in prison. He was granted a second parole hearing on 9 February 2021 after the board's appeal section determined that an error in law was made during the initial hearing; his request was again denied. Langlois was paroled in July 2021 after serving two-thirds of his sentence. As a result of the stipulations imposed on him by the Parole Board, Langlois was forbidden from wearing the Hells Angels' "colors", and from communicating with any person engaged in criminal activity or related to a criminal organization, until the end of his sentence.
