= Buteau =

Buteau is a surname. Notable people with the surname include:

- Michelle Buteau (born 1977), American actress
- Yves Buteau (1951–1983), Canadian outlaw biker and gangster
