= Yves Trudeau (biker) =

Canadian outlaw biker and hitman (1946–2008)

- Born: 4 February 1946; Quebec, Canada
- Died: July 2008 (aged 62); Quebec, Canada
- Other names: "Apache", "The Mad Bomber"
- Status: Deceased
- Allegiance: Popeye MC (1968–1977); Hells Angels MC (1977–1985)
- Criminal charges: Manslaughter (43 counts) (1985); Sexual assault (2004)
- Penalty: Life imprisonment with possibility of parole after 7 years (1985); 4 years' imprisonment (2004)

Yves Trudeau (4 February 1946 – July 2008), also known as Apache and The Mad Bomber, was a Canadian outlaw biker, gangster, contract killer, rapist, child molester, and serial killer. A former member of the North chapter of Hells Angels in Laval, Trudeau was the club's leading assassin and a major participant in multiple biker conflicts throughout Canadian history, including the Popeyes–Devils Disciples War, the Satan's Choice–Popeyes War and the First Biker War. Frustrated by cocaine addiction and his suspicion that his fellow gang members wanted him dead, he became a Crown witness after the Lennoxville massacre. In exchange, he received a lenient sentence – life in prison but eligible for parole after seven years – for the killing of 43 people from September 1973 to July 1985.

Trudeau was granted parole in 1994, and given the new identity of Denis Côté. He was arrested in March 2004 for sexually assaulting a young boy and received four more years' imprisonment. In 2007, Trudeau learned he had cancer and was transferred from Archambault penitentiary to a medical centre, where he died in 2008. He was one of Canada's most notorious and prolific serial killers.

== Background ==
The years 1936 to 1960 are a period in Québec history known to Québécois as the Grande Noirceur ("Great Darkness"), when Quebec was mostly ruled by the ultra-conservative Catholic Union Nationale party. Starting with the 1960 Quebec general election, which saw the Union Nationale defeated by the Quebec Liberals, Quebec society experienced sweeping changes known as the Quiet Revolution that saw Quebec go in the space of a decade from being one of the most conservative societies in North America to being one of the most liberal. As part of the reaction against the "medieval" Catholic social mores of the Grande Noirceur, the Québécois embraced a culture of hedonism in the 1960s with Quebec having for example a significantly higher rate of illegitimate births and drug use than English Canada. As part of the same backlash against the "suffocating" conformism of the Grande Noirceur, outlaw motorcycle clubs became very popular in Quebec in the 1960s with many French-Canadian young men seeing the outlaw biker culture as a symbol of freedom, rebellion and machismo, and by 1968 la belle province had 350 outlaw biker clubs. One result of Quebec having so many outlaw motorcycle clubs was a degree of violence and viciousness between the different biker groups that had no parallel in the rest of Canada as there were too many clubs seeking their share of the organized crime rackets, giving Quebec the reputation as the "Red Zone" in the outlaw biker world. Crime journalist James Dubro stated about the distinctive outlaw biker sub-culture of Quebec: "There's always has been more violence in Quebec. In the biker world it's known as the Red Zone. I remember an Outlaws hit man telling me he was scared going to Montreal."

The Popeye Moto Club, led by Yves Buteau, were the Quebec club that would eventually become Canada's first Hells Angels chapter. They were considered to be the most violent outlaw biker club in Quebec, and were infamous for engaging in gratuitous and sadistic violence that attracted the attention of the Hells Angels. The Popeyes were often employed by the Montreal Mafia to perform murders for them.

== Hells Angels ==
Trudeau joined the Popeye Moto Club in 1968. In 1975, the Ontario-based Satan's Choice Motorcycle Club began an alliance with the American Outlaws Motorcycle Club, allowing the Outlaws to gain a way to challenge the supremacy of the Hells Angels in Quebec through access to the Montreal chapter of Satan's Choice. This led the Hells Angels-backed Popeyes into open conflict with the Satan's Choice Montreal chapter and their Outlaw allies, resulting in a number of casualties on both sides. The Popeyes had targeted the Devil's Disciples biker gang, who were allies of Satan's Choice. The Devils' Disciples and the Montreal chapter of Satan's Choice were engaged in the manufacturing and smuggling of chemical drugs, a market that the Popeyes decided to violently enter in 1974, leading to the biker war. Trudeau first rose to prominence as the Popeyes' ace assassin during this struggle. By January 1976, the Devil's Disciples gang had voted to disband themselves after 15 of their members had been murdered since 1974, thereby giving the Popeye Club control of the area around St. Henri Square.

Dubro said in an interview: "He had this fascination early in life with bikers and military things and weapons and bombs." Trudeau took a job with an explosives factory to learn how to handle explosives and would become an expert at building bombs. Pierre de Champlain, a former Royal Canadian Mounted Police (RCMP) officer who wrote the book Histoire du crime organisé à Montréal, stated in an interview: "He was very professional, very meticulous, and that's why they used his services." Trudeau scalped one of his victims, which earned him the moniker "Apache".

On 5 December 1977, Trudeau would be a founding member of the Hells Angels in Quebec in 1977 after the Popeyes patched over. On the night of 17 February 1978, an incident occurred at a bar popular with the Hells Angels, the Brasserie Joey, when two Outlaws chose to drink until they were ejected by the Angels. When the two Outlaws stood outside cursing the Angels, a green car came down the street out of the snowfall, and briefly stopped while the driver opened fire. Trudeau was the driver and shooter who killed Robert Côté and wounded the other. The incident sparked a biker war between the Hells Angels and the Outlaws that was to last until 1984.

In September 1979, the Hells Angels national president Yves "Le Boss" Buteau broke up the Hells Angels Montreal chapter into a North chapter based in Laval led by Laurent "L'Anglais" Viau and a South chapter based in Sorel-Tracy led by Réjean "Zig Zig" Lessard. The reason for the breaking up the chapter into two was that the Montreal chapter had too many members and their clubhouse was becoming too crowded. Trudeau was assigned to the North chapter. The North chapter would become known for its violent and reckless behavior and excessive drug use. The North chapter were mostly former Popeyes, and still retained Popeye attitudes, in marked contrast to the Montreal South chapter headed by Lessard, which consisted of men who joined the Angels after 1977 and were more disciplined. After Buteau was assassinated by the Outlaws on 8 September 1983, the rules governing drug use were widely ignored by Viau. The new Hells Angels national president, Michel "Sky" Langlois, was largely focused on expanding the Hells Angels into the other provinces. Viau had a more tolerant and relaxed attitude towards violence and drug use, which was encouraged by the absence of Buteau. Under Viau's leadership, the Laval chapter, which had often chafed at Buteau's rules, got out of control.

Standing five-foot-six, weighing 135 pounds and clean shaven with short hair, Trudeau did not resemble the prototypical biker, but he is considered to be the Hells Angels' most prolific killer. Other Angels weighed between 300 and 400 pounds, had an average height of 6'0 feet, and had long hair and beards, leading the journalist Jerry Langton to write that "...nobody would have guessed he was the club's enforcer and primary weapon". The Irish-Canadian West End Gang led by Frank "Dunie" Ryan, who controlled the Port of Montreal and thus the importation of drugs into Quebec, frequently made use of Trudeau's services to liquidate their rivals.

Trudeau admitted to killing 43 people from September 1970 to July 1985. He was the first Canadian Hells Angel to earn the "Filthy Few" patch, allegedly awarded to members who have killed for the club. During a biker war between the Hells Angels and the Outlaws for control of Montreal's drug trade between 1978 and 1983, Trudeau killed 18 out of the 23 Outlaws slain during the conflict. Langton called Trudeau a "psychopathic killer" and a "killing machine" par excellence, who was the Angels' most dangerous killer. Dubro stated about Trudeau: "He had absolutely no conscience, no respect for human life at all." To assist with his killings, Trudeau started to heavily use cocaine. Dubro commented: "Most of the hit men I've met have been cokeheads, and they usually coke up before doing the killings. Makes it a little easier. Not all of them, but alcoholism and drug use is very common among hit men."

=== Lennoxville massacre ===
Trudeau testified in 1985 that West End Gang chieftain Frank "Dunie" Ryan's successor, Allan "The Weasel" Ross, had offered to pay him $200,000 to eliminate Ryan's killers and he had been paid $25,000 in advance. When Trudeau tried to collect the rest of the $200,000 after killing April and Lelièvre, Ross told him he should go collect the money from the Halifax and Sorel chapters of the Hells Angels who owned the West End Gang drug debts, saying he would forgive those debts if those chapters paid the money to Trudeau instead.

The president of the Hells Angels Halifax chapter, David "Wolf" Carroll, paid Trudeau $98,000. Carroll later learned that the Laval chapter was actually entitled to one-quarter of the money, and that Trudeau had used the extra money to support his cocaine addiction. As the Halifax chapter was much poorer than the Laval chapter, Trudeau's behavior was considered to be especially crass. Trudeau's stealing from the Halifax chapter led directly to the Lennoxville massacre of March 1985. Trudeau's stealing from the Halifax chapter only added to the resentment many Hells Angels already felt towards members of the North Chapter. Other Hells Angels felt that the North Chapter bikers were too wild and uncontrollable. They often used drugs they were supposed to sell and were suspected of cheating other chapters out of drug profits. A decision was made by Lessard to liquidate the North Chapter, in what would be known in biker history as the Lennoxville massacre. Réjean Lessard, the president of the Sorel chapter, met with Georges "Bo-Boy" Beaulieu, the president of the Sherbrooke chapter, and David "Wolf" Carroll, the president of the Halifax chapter, to plan the liquidation of the Laval chapter.

A meeting was set up at the Sherbrooke Chapter's clubhouse in Lennoxville on 24 March 1985. At that gathering, five members of the North Chapter were shot to death, wrapped in sleeping bags, and dumped in the St. Lawrence River. The others were allowed to live and were absorbed into the Montreal South chapter. Trudeau was supposed to be at that meeting, but had enrolled in a detoxification program the week before. He later said he wanted to clean himself up, because he knew what happened to members who were always high. News of the North Chapter slaughter soon reached Trudeau at the detox centre in Oka, and Trudeau received a visit from a Montreal Chapter representative, Normand Hamel. Trudeau was told that he was out of the club and would have to have his club tattoos removed.

== Crown witness ==
After his release from the detox centre, Trudeau discovered that the Hells Angels had taken his motorcycle and $46,000 in cash that belonged to him from the North Chapter clubhouse. They said they would return the bike if he killed two people for the gang. Trudeau succeeded in killing one of the targets. Jean-Marc Deniger was killed in May 1985 and stuffed in his car. Satisfied, the Hells Angels gave Trudeau his motorcycle back.

Trudeau knew he was living on borrowed time, however. The Hells Angels had taken out a $50,000 contract on his head, and he decided to become a police informant and government witness.

In 1985, Trudeau pleaded guilty to 43 counts of manslaughter, meaning that as far as the Crown is concerned, Trudeau did not intentionally kill his 43 victims – 29 of whom died from firearms, 10 from bombs, three from being beaten to death, and one from strangulation. Police estimated 30 to 35 of his victims were other motorcycle gang members or sympathizers. Trudeau also testified on 40 other murders and 15 attempted murders. The Conservative senator Pierre-Hugues Boisvenu questioned the value of the plea bargain the Crown reached with Trudeau, saying: "Apache Trudeau didn't have to fight for his money, he didn't have to fight to be well treated. These are programs that cost us millions of dollars. The criminals take advantage of protection that isn't available to victims and a lot of the criminals who turned informant will wind up being recidivist."

As part of his controversial contract with the government, Trudeau was sentenced to life in prison, with eligibility for parole in seven years. Under his deal, the government also gave him $40,000 over the next four years and about $35 a week for cigarettes. At trial, judge Dube had declined a defence motion to learn how much Trudeau and another Crown witness were being paid for their testimony implicating others.

== Release from prison ==
Trudeau was granted parole in 1994 and given a new identity. He lived under the name Denis Côté, resettled in the Valleyfield area, lived with a woman who did not know his past, and worked as an orderly in a nursing home and a bus driver for the handicapped. However, after being laid off in 2000, he slid back into cocaine addiction and sexually assaulted a 13-year-old boy after plying him with wine and beer, for which he pleaded guilty in 2004. He was sentenced to a four-year prison term. Quebec Court Judge Michel Duceppe noted "In your lifetime, you have killed more people than the Canadian military did in the Gulf War." Trudeau returned to prison under the double stigma of being both an informant and a child molester, meaning that he had to be kept in isolation 23 hours a day for his own protection.

In 2006, Trudeau was diagnosed with bone-marrow cancer. In July 2008, the Canadian National Parole Board granted him parole and ordered him released to an outside medical-care facility. As part of his release, Trudeau was not allowed to contact minors or the victims of his crimes. The sister of one of Trudeau's victims, opposed to him being granted parole, told the Journal de Montréal: "Killing to him was like buying a bag of milk. A guy like that doesn't have a soul. That cancer is justice."

== List of murders committed by Trudeau ==
Name	Date	Notes
Jean-Marie Viel	1970	Trudeau's first known victim, Viel was shot to death in Trois-Rivières after he stole a motorcycle from the Popeyes.
Robert Côté	17 February 1978	Trudeau shot down Côté with a machine-gun as the latter stood outside of the Brasserie Joey, loudly cursing and swearing at the Hells Angels inside of the Brasserie Joey.
Gilles Cadorette	21 March 1978	Trudeau assassinated Cadorette, the president of the Montreal chapter of the Outlaws, with a bomb he planted in his car.
Brian Powers	10 November 1978	Trudeau assassinated 34-year-old Powers, an Outlaw leader, by knocking on the door of his Sainte-Geneviève home and shooting him in the head nine times when he answered.
William Weichold	8 December 1978	On the evening of 8 December 1978, Trudeau saw a man walking down a street in Montreal who resembled an Outlaw leader, Roland "Roxy" Dutemple. Trudeau walked up to him, asked "Êtes-vous Roxy?" ("Are you Roxy?") and when the man did not answer, pulled out his handgun and shot him in the head. On the next day Trudeau learned from reading the newspapers that the man he killed was Weichold, who just happened to look like Dutemple and did not answer his question because he spoke no French. Weichold had no involvement with organized crime. Trudeau later remembered laughing hysterically when he learned from reading Le Devoir that the man he killed was Weichold, not Dutemple. Trudeau's only disappointment with killing Weichold was that the Angels chose not to pay him for that killing as he requested, as he argued that people who looked like Dutemple should be killed in case they were him.
Roland "Roxy" Dutemple	29 March 1979	Trudeau finally assassinated Dutemple with a car bomb.
Robert Labelle	3 April 1979	Trudeau assassinated Labelle, the leader of a gang in Laval called the Huns, who, rumor had it, was planning to have his gang "patch over" to join the Outlaws. Trudeau knocked on his door, and when Labelle opened it, shot him in the head.
Donald McLean and Cameran Piche	9 May 1979	McLean was a member of the rival Outlaws gang and Piche was his girlfriend. Trudeau blew them both up when a bomb attached to McLean's Harley-Davidson motorcycle exploded.
Jeanne Desjardins, André Desjardins, and Berthe Desjardins	February 1980	A grandmother, killed for trying to help her son, ex-Hells Angel André Desjardins. Trudeau beat her to death and then killed her son and his girlfriend. The bodies of the latter two were dumped in the St. Lawrence River.
Robert Morin	14 March 1981	Trudeau killed Morin with a bomb planted under his car.
Donat Lemieux and Lucie Vallières	9 May 1981	Trudeau killed Donat Lemieux and his girlfriend, Lucie Vallières, on their porch in Rosemont.
Patrick "Hughie" McGurnaghan	27 October 1981	A reputed West End Gang member who was blown up in Westmount when a bomb planted in his Mercedes-Benz detonated, killing him and seriously injuring a male passenger. Trudeau later said Frank "Dunie" Ryan had hired him to commit the murder.
Charlie Hachez	January 1982	Even fellow Hells Angels were not safe: Trudeau killed Hachez, a member of the North Chapter, because he had a heavy drug problem, had conspired to kidnap Frank Ryan's children and owed Ryan $150,000 in drug money. When Ryan learned about the kidnapping plot, he informed the Hells Angels that they either liquidate those involved or be cut off from the cocaine that he sold them. Hachez was lured to a meeting, killed, and his body dumped in the St. Lawrence River.
Denis "Le Curé" Kennedy	January 1982	A Popeye turned Hells Angel, and the leader of the plot to kidnap Frank Ryan's children, was gunned down by Trudeau after being invited to go out for some drinks at a local bar. Kennedy was one of Trudeau's friends, and crime journalist James Dubro commented about his murder: "That's the thing about biker gangs like the Hells Angels. They talk about a brotherhood but when they find someone is no longer useful they just get rid of him."
André Forget	7 May 1983	A partner of Trudeau, he was shot at a gas station.
Ronald Bernard	7 July 1983	Just one month later, Trudeau shot Bernard, another partner and a hold-up artist.
Michel Desormiers	July 1983	Brother-in-law of reputed mob boss Frank Cotroni, Desormiers was gunned down in July 1983. The killing was cleared with the Montreal Mafia first.
Raymond Filion	10 October 1983	Trudeau shot Filion outside his sister's house in Laval.
Phillipe Galipeau and Rachelle Francoeur	1984	Paul April hired Trudeau to kill drug dealer Galipeau. He shot both Galipeau and his girlfriend Rachelle Francoeur in their rue Cartier house.
Paul April, Robert Lelievre, Louis-Charles Paquette, and Gilles Paquette	25 November 1984	When Frank Ryan was murdered, Trudeau was hired by the new leader of the West End Gang, Allan "the Weasel" Ross, to exact revenge. Trudeau's friend Michel Blass delivered a television stuffed with explosives, along with a VCR and VHS titled "Hells Angels Forever", to the Montreal apartment where April and other associates believed tied to Ryan's murder were hiding. After Blass exited, Trudeau remotely detonated the bomb killing April, Lelievre, Louis-Charles and Gilles Paquette and injured eight others. At trial, lawyer Real Charbonneau was arrested for obstructing justice, visiting Blass four times in prison seeking to have him discredit Trudeau's account.
Jean-Marc "La Grande Maw" Deniger	1 May 1985	A drug dealer who was an associate of the Hells Angels North Chapter. Trudeau strangled Deniger. He stuffed his body in the trunk of his car and abandoned it on a city street.

== See also ==
- List of serial killers by country
