= First Biker War =

Gang war in Eastern Canada between the Outlaws and the Hells Angels

- Date: 1977–1984
- Location: Quebec and Ontario, Canada
- Caused by: Narcotics trade, territorial & criminal disputes
- Goals: Both clubs attempt to consolidate their control over territory in Quebec and Ontario
- Result: Hells Angels Victory: Hells Angels consolidate power in Quebec and begin to expand across Canada; Ontario remains in control of the Outlaws until 2000

Parties
| Hells Angels: Wild Ones MC | Outlaws Motorcycle Club Support: Satan's Choice |

Lead figures
| Yves Buteau †: Yves Trudeau; Walter Stadnick | Garnet McEwen: John Galipeau †; Gilles Cadorette † |

Casualties
- Deaths: 62–72
- Injuries: 100+
- Arrested: 50+

From 1977 to 1984, the Hells Angels and the Outlaws Motorcycle Club fought what came to be known in Canada as the First Biker War. The Angels emerged victorious. As the Outlaws retreated into their Ontario stronghold, the Angels began consolidating their activities and expanding, moving into port cities Halifax, Nova Scotia and Vancouver, British Columbia. The conflict is known in Canada as the "First Biker War", but the first large conflict between bikers in Canada, was the Satan's Choice-Popeyes War which occurred from 1974 to 1976.

== Prelude to war ==
The Outlaws allied themselves with the largest motorcycle club in Canada, Satan's Choice, in 1974. This pact led to a situation where the Outlaws challenged the supremacy of the Hells Angels influence in Quebec through access to the Montreal chapter of Satan's Choice. This led the Montreal chapter and their Outlaw allies into open conflict with the Hells Angels-backed Popeye Moto Club, resulting in a number of casualties on both sides in what would come to be known as the Satan's Choice-Popeyes War. Both clubs sought to expand into Canada, with the Outlaws arriving a few months before the Hell's Angels in 1977.

== 1977 ==
In 1976, the leader of the Satan's Choice Motorcycle Club, Bernie Guindon, was sent to prison for narcotics charges. In 1977, the Outlaws expanded into Canada and the arrest of Guindon led to the fracturing of Satan's Choice. On 1 July 1977, the Ottawa, St. Catharines, Windsor, and Montreal chapters left Satan's Choice in favour of the Outlaws. Garnet McEwen called a secret meeting on 1 July 1977 with most of the chapter presidents being present where he called for "patching over" to the Outlaws, arguing that being members of an American-based club would add to their power, saying that the St. Catherine's and Windsor chapters had already decided to join the Outlaws. The chapter presidents known to be loyal to Guindon were not invited to the meeting.

The Hells Angels would also expand into Canada in 1977, when in December they patched-over the second largest motorcycle club in Canada, the Popeye Moto Club, which they had been scouting for years as it was known as the most notorious and violent motorcycle club in Canada. Tensions between the two groups in Ontario and Quebec began almost immediately, with small scuffles and incidents at the end of 1977.

== 1978 ==
In February 1978, a chapter of the Montreal Rockers MC became the second Quebec chapter of the Outlaws Motorcycle Club. In the same month on February 15, Hells Angels member Yves "Apache" Trudeau shot and killed a member of the Outlaws Motorcycle Club, Robert Côté and wounded another at the Joey brewery in Montreal Quebec; this was the beginning of the war between the Angels and the Outlaws in the province.

On March 21, 1978, a bomb placed under the car of Gilles Cadorette, the Outlaws MC Montreal chapter president, exploded in front of a bar on Bordeaux Street in Montreal. Cadorette was killed instantly and several others were injured by debris from the explosion. On 25 April 1978, Denis "Le Cure" Kennedy and another Hells Angel entered the Outlaw clubhouse at 144 Rue Saint-Ferdinand and went on a shooting rampage. Although no-one was killed, a number of Outlaws were wounded. On April 26 of the same year, Athanase "Tom Thumb" Markopoulos, a member of the Outlaws Motorcycle Club, was murdered by 2 members of the Hells Angels. On 27 April 1978, Kennedy shot and badly wounded an Outlaw, François Poliseno, and his girlfriend, Suzanne Harvey, while the two were drinking at the Industrial Brasserie bar. Witnesses described the gunman who shot Poliseno and Harvey as leaving in a green car, which the police found parked outside of the Angels' clubhouse. Ballistic tests showed that the bullets fired in the Industrial Brasserie shooting were from the same handgun used in the attack at the Outlaws' clubhouse. As a result, Buteau changed the rules, ordering that henceforward Angels were to leave their guns at the scene of the crime in order to reduce the chances of the police being able to tie together crimes.

On 12 May 1978, the Outlaws struck back when a Hells Angel, René "Canisse" Hébert was wounded, his arm being grazed in a drive-by shooting outside the Angels Montreal clubhouse. On May 26, 1978, Jean Gonthier, an associate of the Outlaws Motorcycle Club, was beaten to death by Paul Ringuette, an associate of the Hells Angels. They were both arrested and sent to the penitentiary of Saint-Vincent-de-Paul in Laval when the murder occurred. In October Walter Stadnick, then President of the Wild Ones MC in Hamilton, Ontario, travelled to Montreal to make contact with Yves Buteau, the national president of Hells Angels Canada, to discuss having the Wild Ones "patch over" to become the first Hells Angels chapter in Ontario. On October 12, 1978, the members of the Hells Angels, Georges Mousseau and Jean Brochu, as well as Guy "Gator" Davies, a member of the Wild Ones, were assassinated at the Tourbillon café on Rue Beaubien, in Montreal, when the Outlaws MC attacked the meeting. Hells Angels members Louis "Ti-Oui" Lapierre and Bruno Coulombe were also injured during the Le Tourbillon massacre.

=== Le Tourbillon massacre ===
The Outlaws saw the possibility of a Hells Angel chapter being established in Ontario by way of the Wild Ones as a threat. On October 12, 1978, two American Outlaws, one from Miami and the other from Detroit, entered Le Tourbillon after following the Angels. One Angel, Louis "Ti-Oui" Lapierre, rose to confront the two American Outlaws, only to be gunned down when one of the Outlaws pulled out his handgun while the other Outlaw pulled out a sawed-off shotgun and opened fire on the party in the booth. One of the Angels, Jean Brochu, was killed, while Lapierre and another Angel, Bruno Coulombe, were badly wounded. The Wild Ones also suffered losses, with George "Chico" Mousseau and Gary "Gator" Davies killed. Stadnick survived by hiding under the table. Buteau learned that the man who hired the two American Outlaws was Roland "Roxy" Dutemple of the Outlaw Montreal chapter, and sent ace assassin Yves "Apache" Trudeau to kill him. However, it wouldn't be until March 29, 1979 that the deed would be complete, with Dutemple being killed by a car bomb.

=== Conflict leaks into Ontario ===
These events would cause the conflict to spread into the province of Ontario. Detective John Gordon Harris of the Hamilton police told the journalist Jerry Langton: "As soon as the Wild Ones began to associate with the Hells Angels, the Outlaws told them they shouldn't do that. And they probably shouldn't have, as it led to several deaths". The Hamilton chapter of the Outlaws for their contribution to the conflict, started killing the Wild Ones, which led to the disbanding of the Wild Ones after five members were killed. Denis Stewart of the Wild Ones was killed by a bomb planted in his car. Danny Powell of the Wild Ones was likewise the victim of a bomb, through he only lost his entire right leg instead of his life. The store of the Wild One Alvin Patterson was shot up in an unsuccessful attempt to kill him. John "Cataract Jack" Pluim of the Wild Ones also survived narrowly survived a murder attempt when his strippers agency was shot up. When Stadnick returned from Montreal, he found his gang had voted themselves out of existence, but Stadnick chose to continue as a Hells Angel, operating in Montreal and alone in Hamilton.

On November 10, Yves "Apache" Trudeau shot Brian Powers, former president of the Outlaws Motorcycle Club, at his home in West Montreal. On November 25, 1978, Montreal Police killed Jean-Marc Patenaude, a member of the Outlaws, who was guarding the body of "Ziggy" Wiseman, at the "King of massage parlors'. In December, Yves Trudeau gunned down the biker William Weichold, whom he accidentally mistook for an Outlaw.

== 1979 ==
On March 29, 1979, Yves "Apache" Trudeau destroyed the car of Roland Dutemple, an Outlaws informant, with explosives in Longueuil, Quebec. On April 3 of the same year Yves Trudeau kills Robert Labelle, a clothing importer, narcotics trafficker and the former president of the Huns motorcycle club, who had "patched-over" to the Outlaws, at his home in Fabreville, Quebec. On May 9, 1978, three members of the Hells Angels, Yves "Le Boss" Buteau, Jean-Pierre Mathieu and Yves "Apache" Trudeau, murdered Donald McLean, a member of the Outlaws Motorcycle Club, as well as his girlfriend, Carmen Piché. They were killed by an explosive that was attached to McLean's motorcycle.

In September 1979, Trudeau and others gained permission from the Montreal chapter to form the Montreal North chapter, which was based in Laval, and was most commonly referred to as the Laval chapter. The group would become known for its violent, reckless behaviour and excessive drug use. The North chapter were mostly former Popeyes, and still retained Popeye attitudes. This was in marked contrast to the Montreal South chapter, which was headed by Réjean "Zig Zag" Lessard, which consisted of men who joined the Angels after 1977 and were more disciplined. This notorious behavior would come to cause problems for the Montreal North chapter, leading to an event that would be known as the Lennoxville massacre.

== 1980 ==
Media attention for 1980 was relatively low in comparison to previous years, however several brawls and attacks using molotov cocktails and explosives had occurred throughout the year, costing both clubs "significant loss in property and income". By late 1980, it was estimated by authorities that Angels–Outlaw biker war had been responsible for 20-30 murders in Quebec and Ontario, while between 1981 and 1984 another 42 were killed.

== 1981 ==
On 14 March 1981. Yves "Apache" Trudeau placed a bomb in the vehicle of an associate of the Outlaws, Robert Morin. The explosion killed Morin. This year would see a slight rest in the conflict as both sides regained their footing.

== 1982 ==
Due to blowback from the West End Gang. In January 1982, Trudeau killed Charlie Hachez, a member of the Laval Chapter and another Angel, because they had heavy drug problems, had conspired to kidnap Frank Ryan's kids and owed Ryan $150,000 in drug money, specifically Hachez. When Ryan learned about the kidnapping plot, he informed the Hells Angels that they either liquidate those involved or be cut off from the cocaine that he sold them. Hachez was lured to a meeting, killed, and his body dumped in the St. Lawrence River. The year come to an end with the groups exchanging back and forth, resulting in several more dead and more injured.

== 1983 ==
On 15 July 1983, Trudeau killed Michel Desormiers at his home located in the town of Deux-Montagnes. Desormiers was the brother-in-law of Cotroni crime family mob boss Frank Cotroni. In September 1983 Yves Buteau, along with his friend and fellow Hells Angels MC member Rene Lamoureaux, were at Le Petit Bourg bar, which was located in the suburb of Longueuil, Quebec. The pair hosted Guy "Frenchie" Gilbert, a member of Satan's Choice MC who had travelled to Quebec from Ontario. Gino Goudreau, a 22-year-old narcotics dealer, brother to an Outlaws MC member in Quebec, was waiting outside the bar on his bike, along with his girlfriend. When Buteau, Lamoureaux and Gilbert exited the bar, Gino Goudreau left his girlfriend on the bike and approached the men, revealing a .38 pistol and emptying the magazine on the three men. Yves Buteau was shot twice in the chest and died immediately, and Guy "Frenchie" Gilbert died shortly after. Rene Lamoureaux survived the shooting with serious injuries.

Gino Goudreau went into hiding, however he was located and arrested by police only a few months later. He was charged with two counts of murder of the second degree. In the trial that followed Goudreau claimed that Yves Buteau had threatened him on many occasions, and on the night of the shooting, Yves Buteau also pulled a gun, however Gino Goudreau was able to fire off shots first. The self defence claim was successful and Goudreau was acquitted of the murder.

On 17 July 1983, Mario Parente happened to see two Hells Angels from Montreal, Michel "Jinx" Genest and Jean-Marc Nadeau, on the bus to Vancouver to attend a ceremony, while he was riding his bike through Northern Ontario. Enraged, Parente, and other Outlaws with him, proceeded to shoot up the bus when it stopped at the Mr. Mugs coffee and doughnut shop in Wawa, in an attempt to kill the two Hells Angels. Through no one was killed, the Wawa incident showed how strongly Parente felt about Hells Angels moving into Ontario, which was considered to be Outlaws territory since 1977.

On September 12, 1983, a funeral for Yves Buteau was held at a church in the town of Sorel. It is estimated that there were over 2,000 supporters and 150 members of the Hells Angels from Canada, the United States, England and elsewhere, who rode in procession from Sorel to Drummondville where he was buried, a journey covering a distance of approximately 40 miles. He shares a gravestone with Hells Angels member Adrien Fleury, aka "Pistache".

A day after Buteau's funeral, a young boy discovered a bomb on the route the funeral procession had gone past, which consisted of Hells Angels bikers. Police theorized that it had been placed and camouflaged the night before the funeral in an attempt to kill Hells Angels bikers.

== 1984 ==
Buteau's murder did not change the tide of war in favour of the Outlaws. In March 1984, Bernard Savoie, the brother and right-hand man of the Outlaw Montreal chapter president Daniel Savoie, was killed by a bomb planted in his car. In May 1984 Daniel Savoie and John Galipeau, both members of the Outlaws, were assassinated while riding their motorcycles down a highway by gunmen riding motorcycles. By 1984, the Hells Angels had dealt major damage to the Montreal chapters of the Outlaws, and the conflict came to an end with the Outlaws pulling back to their power base in Ontario.

A year later, when Yves Trudeau turned Crown Informant, he admitted to killing 43 people between September 1973 and July 1985. He was the first Canadian Hells Angel to earn the "Filthy Few" patch, awarded to members who had killed for the club. During the biker war between the Hells Angels and the Outlaws for control of Montreal's drug trade between 1978 and 1983, Trudeau killed 18 out of the 23 Outlaws slain during the conflict. Langton called Trudeau a "psychopathic killer" and a "killing machine" par excellence, who was the Angels' most dangerous killer.

== Violence reignites and aftermath ==
In 1985, construction of a bunker in Danville, Quebec by the Outlaws Motorcycle Club was started. On September 15, 1989, the Outlaws bunker was rocked by an explosion during an attack. In April 1990, the municipality of Danville destroyed the Outlaws Motorcycle Club bunker following its purchase from the motorcycle club. In September of the same year, Claude Meunier, the leader of the Outlaws Motorcycle Club, was assassinated when he was struck multiple times by a man firing from a moving automobile in the Côte-Saint-Paul district of Montreal. The police found the murder weapon in a storm sewer near the scene of the crime. In October 1990, Tony Mentore, a friend of Claude Meunier, who was the leader of the Outlaws Motorcycle Club murdered the previous month, was murdered in front of the shop family kitchen equipment, in the Park Extension district of Montreal.

In 1991, on February 20, Darquis Leblanc, a former member of the Outlaws Motorcycle Club who became an associate of the Hells Angels, was assassinated along with his right-hand man and brother-in-law, Yvan Martel. Their corpses were discovered in an alley near Boulevard Taschereau in Longueuil. March 26, 1992, saw the founding of the Montreal Rockers, a Hells Angels support club sponsored by Maurice "Mom" Boucher (these Rockers are not to be mistaken for those who became the Outlaws in 1978).

On January 29, 1997, in the midst of the Quebec Biker War which saw the Hells Angels engage with the Canadian-based Rock Machine for territorial supremacy in Quebec, The Hells Angels, Outlaws and Bandidos agreed to an international peace treaty to end the war between the three major transnational criminal organizations. On May 28, 2008, the Outlaws Roy "Capone" Haynes Jr, aged 34, alleged leader of the Outlaws operating in the Downtown area and in the Pointe-Saint-Charles, Verdun and Saint-Henri neighborhoods of Montreal. Six members of the Outlaws were arrested following Operation Satellites was undertaken 2 years previously; the gang was selling 1 to 2 kg of cocaine and crack per month, in addition to the drug trafficking and charges of gangsterism, the leader of the Outlaws in Quebec is charged with procuring, he allegedly used the income from the work of his prostitutes to buy drugs.

== See also ==
List of outlaw motorcycle club conflicts

== Sources ==
- Edwards, Peter; Auger, Michel (2012). The Encyclopedia of Canadian Organized Crime: From Captain Kidd to Mom Boucher. Toronto: McClelland & Stewart. ISBN 978-0771030499..
- Schneider, Stephen (2009). Iced: The Story of Organized Crime in Canada. Toronto: John Wiley & Sons. ISBN 978-0-470-83500-5.
- Cherry, Paul (2005). The Biker Trials: Bringing Down the Hells Angels. ECW Press. ISBN 978-1-55490-250-7.
- Langton, Jerry (2010). Showdown: How the Outlaws, Hells Angels and Cops Fought for Control of the Streets. Toronto: John Wiley & Sons. ISBN 978-0470678787.
- O'Connor, D'Arcy (2011). Montreal's Irish Mafia: The True Story of the Infamous West End Gang. Toronto: John Wiley & Sons. ISBN 978-0470676158.
- Sher, Julian; Marsden, William (2003). The Road to Hell: How the Biker Gangs are Conquering Canada. A.A. Knopf Canada. ISBN 9780676975987.
