= Howard Doyle Berry =

Canadian outlaw biker, criminal and gangster

Howard Doyle Berry (born 1941), better known as "Pigpen", is a Canadian outlaw biker, criminal and gangster.

== Entry into crime ==
Berry was born in Peterborough into a Roman Catholic Irish family and had what was described as a "horrific upbringing" with both of his parents being severely verbally and physically abusive. His father abandoned his family when his son was five years old. Berry was raised by his mother and his sisters, all of whom had developed strongly misandrist tendencies because of abuse by his father. His mother told him he was a monster because he had a penis and forced him to sleep in the basement of their house, adding for good measure that demons lived in the basement and would devour him alive. Berry recalled: "I lived half the time in the basement on a dirt floor and a rubber sheet. I got scared that the bogeyman would get me. She [my mother] used to make me go to church all of the time. I used to piss the bed scared". Believing himself to be the hideous monster that his mother told him that he was, Berry was full of rage against the world and he took up boxing as his principal hobby as a teenager in the 1950s. Standing 6 feet tall and weighting about 245 pounds, Berry became an accomplished amateur boxer at the Peterborough Boxing Club and the East City Bowl Boxing Club. As boxing and organized crime are closely linked in Canada, Berry's skills as a boxer soon led him into the outlaw biker clubs in the early 1960s. He attracted much attention with a street fight against George Clark of the Vagabonds biker gang that led to the police blocking off Avenue Road for an hour while taking bets about who would win. Berry worked as a chef at the Royal York Hotel in Toronto and as a Buddy Holly impersonator.

== Satan's Choice ==
=== Reputation ===
Berry was a founding member of Satan's Choice Motorcycle Club in 1965 and made his reputation with a celebrated street fight in Toronto against Howard "Baldy" Chard, the former boxing champion in Kingston Penitentiary and the principal enforcer for the gangster Johnny Papalia. Berry dropped out of university and became the main enforcer of Satan's Choice. The purpose of Satan's Choice was to oppose the respectable values of Canadian society by engaging in anti-social behavior and the more shocking the act, the better from the viewpoint of Satan's Choice. Berry became the most infamous member of Satan's Choice, who purposefully lived a life of poor hygiene and who wore filthy clothing, hence the nickname Pigpen. Berry was well known for his antics such as bringing his feces to a dinner table and then eating it as by his own admission he had an obsession with coprophagia. His reputation was that of a wildman as Berry engaged in such disgusting antics such as vomiting over new members of Satan's Choice, eating live birds and mice, and attaching a dead skunk he found on the road to his biker's vest. The American journalist Mick Lowe wrote that Berry was "far and away the filthiest, foulest member the Satan's Choice ever had". Under the influence of drugs, Berry became very paranoid to the extent that he pulled out his own teeth because he believed the police had bugged his teeth. The Satan's Choice national president, Bernie Guindon, stated in an interview that Berry was a disgusting and repulsive man, but that he had his uses as an enforcer as Berry was willing to do quite literally anything for Satan's Choice. However, Berry was felt to be most dangerous when he cleaned up his appearance because as he stated: "Nobody would recognize me. Then I went to the dark side of town". Berry often worked as an enforcer alongside his close friend, the Mafia hitman Armand Sanguigni, though Berry insisted in a 2015 interview that he was not involved in any of Sanguigni's murders. The hitman Cecil Kirby stated about Berry: "There are guys who would start fights and then they'd say 'Come and help me'. I can't stand people like that. Be a stand-up guy. He was a stand-up guy. That's what I liked about him".

=== Film career ===
In 1970, the biker exploitation film Hells Angels 69 was released starring Sonny Barger and the other members of the Hells Angels Oakland chapter as themselves. Inspired by the box office success of Hells Angels 69, the film producer George Fras decided to shoot a low-budget biker exploitation film, The Proud Rider, in the Toronto area starring Art Hindle and with members of the Oshawa and Toronto chapters of Satan's Choice playing themselves. The production of The Proud Rider was a troubled one as on the first day of shooting, 3 October 1970, the Toronto police arrested a Satan's Choice biker on the set. Berry, who played himself in The Proud Rider, was a disruptive presence on the set who refused to take direction and constantly engaged in bizarre antics designed to shock and appall the film crew and actors. When the other members of Satan's Choice dropped their pants and underwear out of hope of shocking a script girl, Berry felt upstaged so he bit off the head of a live garter snake out of the hopes he could shock the script girl even more. Chester Stocki, the scriptwriter on The Proud Rider, told the journalist Paul King in December 1970 that he was "scared, scared, scared. Just look at them". Stocki stated that the Satan's Choice bikers were the worst gang of thugs he had ever seen, and that Berry was the worst of the lot as he was completely out of control. Berry disregarded the rules on wearing safety helmets when riding his motorcycles and filmed all of his riding scenes without a helmet, which the director permitted as Berry refused to take any direction. When The Proud Rider was released in 1971, it was a hit in Toronto as audiences flocked to see a film set in and filmed in Toronto and Oshawa, but a box office bomb everywhere else with critics condemning the acting as atrociously bad and the plot as a "ramshackle melodrama".

=== Biker wars ===
Besides for his abortive film career, Berry stayed busy as the principal enforcer for Satan's Choice during biker wars with the Wild Ones biker gang of Hamilton and the Henchmen of Kitchener. Berry said of his role in the biker wars: "I shot a couple of guys. Never killed anyone. I was the general. Do this and do that". Berry described the Henchmen as tougher opponents' than the Wild Ones, saying: "They were tough. They were not pushovers". Berry orchestrated the arson attack that saw the clubhouse of the Henchmen burned to the ground and another attack that saw two of the Henchmen kidnapped. In exchange for the release of the two kidnapped members, the rest of the Henchmen had to hand in their gang colors to Satan's Choice and disband. During their surrender, a Choice member used his car to run over a Henchman and broke his legs. Steve Erslavas, who joined Satan's Choice in 1974, described Berry as a wild-man prone to disgusting antics who had a "completely demented look". Erslavas, who went hunting with Berry in one of the vast forests that cover northern Ontario in winter of 1975, complained that Berry as an odd character who was frightened of owls and shot the wings off one of owl because he disapproved of the way that the owl looked at him.. Erslavas stated it was a major mistake to let Berry cook the food for the Thunder Bay chapter of Satan's Choice as he urinated in the brine he used to cook the partridges he had killed during the hunting trip

In 1974, the Montreal chapter of Satan's Choice became involved in a biker war with the Popeye Moto Club. Berry was called upon to assist. Kirby recalled in a 2015 interview: "If there was trouble anywhere, they'd sent Howard Berry out to take care of it. He was the Choice hitman and everybody knew it". Kirby was present when Berry opened fire on the clubhouse of the Popeyes with a sawed-off Lee–Enfield .303 rifle with a ten-round clip, saying "It was like a cannon going off". In a 2015 interview, Berry stated that he was hired to kill people, but never actually succeeded in doing so, saying he was a poor hitman and denied Kirby's claims that he had killed several people. Berry often worked with Ken Goobie to perform violent acts in what Berry called the "dark side of town".

== Escape to Florida and joining Outlaws Motorcycle Club ==
In 1975 to escape charges of attempted murder in Canada, Berry moved to Florida where he was taken in by the Hollywood, Florida, chapter of the Outlaws Motorcycle Club. In Florida, Berry was given the alias "Peter Ray Johnson" and assisted the Outlaws in various criminal activities. Berry worked as a car thief for the Outlaws along with stealing yachts on their trailers. Berry reported to Bernie Guindon, the president of Satan's Choice: "Down there they played the game for keeps...They're well organized. They made money big time". Berry became involved in the biker war between the Outlaws and the Hells Angels and was shot twice in the chest by the Hells Angels in a failed murder attempt. Guindon stated of Berry's time in Florida: "They [the Outlaws] didn't like him at all. He was getting away with it up here. Down there, I don't think they took much to him. They couldn't stand his fucking bullshit. They thought he was totally crazy". Despite the dislike of Berry by the Outlaws, his presence in Florida expanded the alliance between the Outlaws and Satan's Choice as he played a crucial role in forging the alliance. Starting in the early 1970s, Satan's Choice members operated drug labs in cabins in northern Ontario, with production focusing especially on PCP and methamphetamines, better known in the area as "Canadian Blue". Under the terms of the alliance, the Outlaws served as the exclusive distributors in the United States of the PCPs and methamphetamine manufactured by Satan's Choice in northern Ontario. The "Canadian Blue" methamphetamine produced in Ontario sold for 8,000 Canadian dollars per pound, but in the United States it sold for 12,000 U.S. dollars per pound. The drug network for selling the PCP went from northern Ontario down to Florida, and the police estimated Guindon just by himself was making at least $60 million per month in sales. Verg Erslavas, the president of the Satan's Choice Thunder Bay chapter, stated: "After Howard went to the OLs [Outlaws] it opened the door for even more association/biz. By the mid-70s, we were tight with the OLs in many ways." Berry was convicted in North Carolina for a series of auto thefts along with an attempt to steal a tank from a United States Army base. Upon completing his sentence, Berry was deported to Canada where he was convicted of attempted murder and served his sentence at Collins Bay prison.

== Drop-out ==
After completing his prison sentence in the 1980s, Berry left Satan's Choice to live as a reclusive, living a feral existence in a forest in Ontario. Berry was for a time said to have glued a plastic copy of a diamond to his forehead and wandered around Ontario pretending to be a swami (Hindu holy man). In 2017 Berry was reported to be living in hiding.

== Books ==
- Edwards, Peter (2017), Hard Road: Bernie Guindon and the Reign of the Satan's Choice Motorcycle Club, HarperCollins, ISBN 978-1443427258
- Langton, Jerry (2010). Showdown: How the Outlaws, Hells Angels and Cops Fought for Control of the Streets. Toronto: John Wiley & Sons. ISBN 978-0470678787.
- Lowe, Mick (2013). Conspiracy of Brothers: A True Story of Bikers, Murder and the Law. Toronto: Vintage Canada. ISBN 978-0345813169.
- Schneider, Stephen (2009). Iced: The Story of Organized Crime in Canada (2nd ed.). Toronto: John Wiley & Sons. ISBN 978-0470835005.
- Wolf, David (1991). The Rebels: A Brotherhood of Outlaw Bikers. Toronto: University of Toronto Press. ISBN 0802073638.
