= Cecil Kirby =

Canadian outlaw biker and contract killer

- Born: 17 August 1950 (age 76); Toronto, Ontario, Canada
- Occupations: Outlaw biker; gangster; contract killer
- Years active: 1969–1982
- Known for: Turning Crown's evidence against organised crime
- Notable work: Mafia Enforcer (1986)
- Allegiance: Satan's Choice MC (1969–1976); Commisso 'ndrina (1976–1982)

Cecil Kirby (born 17 August 1950) is a Canadian former outlaw biker, gangster and hitman for the Commisso 'ndrina, turned police informant.

== Early life ==
Kirby was born into an Irish-Canadian family in the Weston neighbourhood of Toronto on 17 August 1950, and was twice expelled from elementary school for unruly behaviour. He grew up in a working-class neighbourhood of Toronto and preferred to use violence from his childhood onward to solve problems. He was refused admission to high school for being a discipline problem.

== Satan's Choice ==
Kirby began his career in organized crime as a member of Satan's Choice Motorcycle Club, which he joined in August 1969. At the time, Satan's Choice led by Bernie "The Frog" Guindon was the largest and most powerful outlaw biker club in Ontario. In the 1970s, Kirby specialized in auto insurance fraud and theft. Kirby rose up to become the sergeant-at-arms of the Satan's Choice Richmond Hill chapter. Satan's Choice had opened a chapter in Montreal, where competition for control of the drug trade was intense. Kirby was present when another Satan's Choice member, Howard "Pigpen" Berry, opened fire on the clubhouse of the Popeyes, the most violent of Quebec's outlaw biker clubs, with a sawed off Lee–Enfield .303 rifle with a ten-round clip, saying: "It was like a cannon going off". Kirby recalled: "If there was trouble anywhere, they'd sent Howard Berry out to take care of it. He was the Choice hitman and everybody knew it". In an interview, Berry stated that he was hired to work as a hitman, but he never actually succeeded in killing anyone.

Kirby learned that Satan's Choice members specialized in seducing the female clerks who operated the Ontario Provincial Police (OPP)'s computers and shared information from the computers with their boyfriends. Kirby wrote in his 1986 memoirs Mafia Enforcer that there was one clerk who had access to the most classified information of the Canadian Police Information Centre and:

Club members carried her number in their wallets. If a member was worried about the cops, all he had to do was call her number, and she'd access the police computer to see if there were any warrants on him. When we spotted a rival gang member, we'd also use her to see if there were any outstanding fugitive warrants on him. If there were, we'd have someone in the club call up the cops and tip them off where that rival was and who was with him. It was a good way of avoiding trouble and getting rid of rival gang members. We could also check out anybody's criminal record through that computer. This helped us spot people trying to infiltrate us from rival gangs or the cops.

Kirby concluded that Satan's Choice "had the upper hand in Toronto because we had the best intelligence network around. We were able to move on the other gangs faster than they could move on us because we had such good sources and good information on the habits of the other gangs". Kirby's ghostwriter on Mafia Enforcer, the American journalist Thomas Renner, described Kirby as a small, but muscular man with curly reddish-blonde hair, striking blue eyes and "an impish, almost boyish face that often breaks into an infectious smile". Those know Kirby well described him as being "schizophrenic" as he alternated between extremes of kindness and cruelty.

Reflecting an emerging alliance with the American Outlaws Motorcycle Club, in 1974 Kirby visited Florida together with Garnet "Mother" McEwen, the president of Satan's Choice St. Catharines chapter, to meet Outlaw leaders. Kirby was clean shaven and had no trouble at the airport as he did not look like an outlaw biker, unlike McEwen whose long hair and beard caused the airport security to view him as a trouble-maker. Kirby described most of the Outlaws he met in Fort Lauderdale as deeply troubled Vietnam veterans unable to readjust to civilian society whose most notable qualities were a fondness for drugs and even more so for violence. Kirby stated: "Their clubhouse was like a fortress. They put a chill down my spine". Kirby worked as a courier for Satan's Choice delivering amphetamines and sometimes served as a bodyguard to the Satan's Choice national president Bernie Guindon.

In 1975, after Guindon was arrested at the Oba Lake drug bust, Kirby visited him in jail in Sault St. Marie together with his close friend Frank "Cisco" Lenti. Kirby was disappointed that Guindon failed to pay him back a drug debt he felt he was owned by Guindon, causing him to become disenchanted with his club. Kirby had a dispute with another Satan's Choice member who he had asked to watch outside as he went into a house to beat up somebody who owed him money, who refused to serve as his look-out on the grounds that he just ordered a pizza, causing Kirby to quit in disgust. In March 1976, Kirby left Satan's Choice and began to work for the 'Ndrangheta, a Mafia-type criminal organization based in the Calabria region of Italy. Lenti recommended Kirby as a hitman and bomber to Cosimo Commisso of the Commisso family, saying that Kirby was very good with bombs and guns, although he also warned that Kirby was not to be completely trusted as he was of non-Italian descent.

== Commisso enforcer ==
Kirby wrote in Mafia Enforcer about his new employers, the Commisso brothers: "I quickly learned that their big thing for making money was the construction industry. They probably made more money from extortions in the construction industry than they did from trafficking in heroin — and it was a helluva lot safer". Of the three Commisso brothers, Kirby usually dealt with Cosimo Commisso. Kirby wrote: "Cosimo wasn't tough — he was homicidal. He'd kill you as soon as you were looking at him if he thought you were crossing him, if he thought it was good for business, or if he thought you insulted him or his family. The lives of other people meant nothing to him". Kirby reported that: "The Commissos would collect money owed to a contractor and take a percentage of it. They didn't let legal technicalities or stalling tactics get in the way". A very profitable form of activity was having their construction companies win the contracts to construct buildings for the federal, provincial and municipal governments as the Commissos used intimidation, bombings, arson and murder to force legitimate companies to drop out of the bidding process or to take over the companies that did win the contracts. After a Commisso-controlled construction company won the contract, Kirby reported: "Once their man got the bid, they became his partners and their people — plasters, electricians, plumbers, cement suppliers — would be used on the job. They'd inflate the cost of the job, pocket the profits and run like thieves while the public or business paid the price".

Later in 1976, Kirby blew up the car of a Brampton salesman, Antonio Burgas Pinheiro. Pinherio was an effective salesman for his employer, Appia Beverages, who were competing against another beverage firm owned by the Siderno Group, and the message was to stop making sales at the expense of the Siderno Group. On 11 November 1976, Kirby left a stick of dynamite in the mailbox of the owner of Pozzabona Construction to pressure him to pay a plastering bill to a client more promptly. The unhappy client had hired Commisso who in turn subcontracted the job to Kirby. In December 1976, Commisso paid Kirby $10,000 to kill Denis Mason, who was due to testify against an ally of Commisso. Kirby planted the bomb in the car of the wrong Denis Mason, but it failed to explode owing to faulty wiring.

On 3 May 1977, Kirby bombed a Chinese restaurant in Toronto, the Wah Kew Chop Suey House. The explosion killed a cook, Chong Yin Quan, and wounded three others. Kirby had been hired via the Commisso brothers by the Kung Lok Triad, who were unhappy that the owners of the Wah Kew Chop Suey House were running an illegal gambling house in the back of the restaurant without paying protection money. In Mafia Enforcer, Kirby coldly wrote about Chong's death: "The murder could have been avoided if the Commissos had done their homework better before handing out the bombing contract." In 1978, Kirby bombed the home of Ben Freedman, a Toronto construction contractor who had fallen into debt with his subcontractors, who in their turn had hired Commisso for help.

On 1 August 1978, Kirby blew up the car belonging to a Hamilton businessman named John Ryan, as part of a Commisso extortion bid. Later in August 1978, Kirby went to Montreal to assassinate Irving Kott, the stockbroker to Vic Cotroni, the boss of the Cotroni family, at the time the most powerful organized crime group in Canada. Kirby was told Cotroni had been hired by others to have Kott killed, but Kirby believed that Kott had cheated Cotroni, who did not want to admit that he had been fooled. Kirby shot Kott, who managed to survive. A second attempt to assassinate Kott by blowing up his car was no more successful and instead wounded two bystanders. In 1979, Kirby was hired by mobbed up Israeli-Canadian night club owner Harold Arviv to blow up his $1 million disco called Arviv's in Toronto. The disco was unprofitable and Arviv decided to blow it up as an insurance scam. Kirby used 30 sticks of dynamite to destroy the disco at about 5 am on 9 January 1980. Kirby also supplied the gun used to kill Toronto Police constable Michael Sweet at the Bourbon Street Tavern on 14 March 1980.

=== Informant ===
By the fall of 1980, Kirby had grown distrustful of the Commisso brothers, complaining that they were stingy with paying him in full and kept supplying him with inaccurate information, causing him to bomb and shoot the wrong people, but then refusing to pay him for his work under the grounds that he had targeted the wrong people. In November 1980, Kirby contacted the Royal Canadian Mounted Police (RCMP) and offered his services as an informant. In exchange for immunity from prosecution for all his past crimes, some $1,950 per month for his information and witness protection for himself and his family, Kirby became a RCMP informant. By his own admission, Kirby's decision to turn Crown's evidence was not due to moral reasons, but instead due to Kirby believed that the Commisso brothers were planning to kill him to avoid paying for services rendered. A RCMP officer who worked with Kirby stated he had a "dual personality" that ranged "from a very kind person to a vicious, hot-tempered, violent individual who is quite capable of killing".

In February 1981, Kirby was sent to Stamford, Connecticut, to kill what was described to him as "some broad that is causing problems". At the time there was what has been described as a "hitman exchange program" within North American organized crime under which Canadian assassins were sent to commit murders in the United States in return for American assassins also being sent to commit contract killings in Canada. The woman targeted in question turned out to be Helen Nafplotis, the Greek-American mistress to the brother of 'Ndranghetista Vincenzo Melia, who suspected Nafplotis of being a police informant. The RCMP informed the American Federal Bureau of Investigation (FBI) of the murder plot against Nafplotis, and after Kirby arrived in Stamford, the FBI took charge of handling him. On 22 February 1981, Melia met Kirby at a cheap motel in Stamford. Melia gave him a handgun to kill Nafplotis together with her photo and the keys to her house. Melia told him to show her no mercy as he handed over a briefcase containing US$5,000, and promised to give him another $5,000 after the "hit" was completed. The FBI faked Nafplotis's murder and upon Kirby's return to Canada, Commisso, unaware that Kirby was wearing a wire, spoke in frank detail about the murder plot, saying he was surprised that Kirby had killed her so soon. In reality, Nafplotis disappeared into the witness protection program and a report that she had been murdered was leaked to the media, which satisfied Kirby's employers that she was dead.

Commisso then gave Kirby the task of murdering Toronto-area Buffalo crime family caporegime Paul Volpe, and his driver-bodyguard, Pietro Scarcella in return for $20,000. Like the Commisso brothers, Volpe's crew was heavily active in extorting from construction companies throughout the greater Toronto area. Volpe, who also had a well deserved reputation for being treacherous, had invited the Commissos into a real estate deal and then cheated them, causing the brothers to vow vengeance. Volpe had also expanded his operations from southern Ontario to Atlantic City, New Jersey, which enraged both the Philadelphia crime family and the Five Families, who saw Volpe as a foreign upstart who was unwilling to obey the code of conduct and who was all too willing to rip off his fellow Made guys. Finally, Volpe had willingly appeared onscreen in multiple Canadian Broadcasting Corporation (CBC) documentaries about the alleged role of the Mafia and other organized crime within the Canadian economy, which further enraged old school Wiseguys who felt no Mafiosi be interviewed for television even if it was only to deny being a criminal, as all publicity was bad publicity.

During a conversation on 31 March 1981, Commisso told Kirby that he needed permission from an unnamed higher authority before he could issue concrete the orders to kill Volpe. When Kirby later asked "What about Volpe?", Commisso replied: "I'm waiting for an answer, OK?" On 23 April 1981, Commisso also told Kirby that Scarcella could not yet be killed without permission from the same unnamed authority, but that the Commissos had now been granted permission to kill Volpe. Commisso stated: "Ah, Scarcella, forget about it for now. Just don't worry about it for now", leading Kirby to ask "For how long?". Commisso replied: "A month, two months, we don't know yet. There's another guy". When Kirby asked "What the fuck is going on?", Commisso answered: "There's another guy I want you to take care of instead of him."

Meanwhile, Toronto Police Service Sergeant Al King visited Volpe to tell him that a contract had been placed on his life and asked him if he would like to co-operate with an ongoing investigation by faking his death, a request that Volpe agreed to despite it being yet another cardinal violation of the Mafia code. Sergeant King later stated he had been expecting Volpe to refuse, and was most surprised that he agreed to assist the police. Wearing a wire, Kirby went to the house of Rocco Remo Commisso on 16 May 1981 to tell him: "Volpe, he's dead... I just killed him an hour ago". In fact, Volpe and his wife were hiding inside the RCMP's Toronto office. Commisso asked for proof that Kirby had indeed killed Volpe, leading him to produce Volpe's wallet with his driver's licence in it, which Kirby said he had taken from his corpse. After looking over the wallet, Commisso was finally satisfied. After complaining that he should not have come to his house, Commisso paid Kirby $1,000, and said he would have more money for him soon. Commisso repeatedly assured Kirby that he and his brothers "would take care" of him. In organized crime, however, excessive displays of affection and promises of loyalty are often a sign that those displaying the sympathy may instead be planning to kill the seeming object of their affection. For this reason, Kirby was always in fear for his life by the number of times Cosimo Commisso told him that he was like family to the Commisso brothers. In 1982, the Commisso brothers were arrested by the RCMP and charged with conspiracy to commit murder. Volpe's further violation of the Mafia code by co-operating with Canadian law enforcement was duly noted and in 1983 he was assassinated, it is believed, by fellow members of the Buffalo crime family.

== Life in hiding ==
As a result of Kirby's testimony, Rocco Remo and Cosimo Commisso were convicted of conspiracy to murder, counselling to commit murder, possession of property obtained by crime, conspiracy to commit extortion, counselling another person to commit an indictable offence, causing bodily harm, and conspiracy to commit fraud, and sentenced to 14 1/2 years and 21 years respectively. Michele Commisso and another Commisso 'ndrina member, Antonio Rocco Romeo, were also convicted on the basis of Kirby's evidence of conspiring to murder Nafpiotis and sentenced to two and a half years in prison. In 1982, the RCMP reported that the Mafia had promised to pay $100,000 to anybody who could kill Kirby. In 1986, Arviv was convicted on the basis of Kirby's testimony. By 1986, altogether some 37 people had been convicted in trials with Kirby serving as the main witness for the Crown. Notably, Kirby proved far more willing to testify against the Commisso brothers and the people who had employed them than he was against his former associates in Satan's Choice, providing the police with hardly any information of value about his former outlaw biker club.

Kirby revealed much about the influence Commisso 'ndrina and Satan's Choice on the Canadian economy such as:

- With the aid of a Bell Canada worker, Satan's Choice was able to discover any unlisted telephone number that they wanted to find.
- A postman with Canada Post was regularly bribed with a bottle of whiskey to steal credit cards and drivers licenses from the mail.
- A dispatcher with the Ontario Provincial Police was providing Satan's Choice with intelligence.
- A banker was selling credit card and bank account information to the Commisso 'ndrina, which used the intelligence to pick extortion targets.
- Satan's Choice was receiving information from a clerk with the Ministry of Transportation about license plate information, especially with regard to what automobiles were unmarked police vehicles.
- A female clerk who operated the CPIC was providing Satan's Choice with information.

One's Satan's Choice biker, Lorne Campbell, ended up serving alongside the Commisso brothers at the Millhaven Institution, where Rocco Remo made a point of expressing his displeasure with Satan's Choice and Kirby's decision to turn informer with him. Campbell, who had strongly disliked Kirby when he had known him in Satan's Choice, stated the Commisso brothers had only themselves to blame for being convicted of conspiracy to commit murder as he stated: "Why would you trust a guy who wasn't true-tested? Kirby wasn't a hitman. He was just a guy who went around scaring people, knocking over their mailboxes".

In November 1986, Kirby published his autobiography Mafia Enforcer, ghostwritten by an American journalist Thomas Renner, which provoked controversy with many charging that a criminal should not be allowed to profit from his crimes by writing a best-selling book. The Conservative MP David Kilgour said: "I don’t think Mr. Kirby should profit from his book.". Kirby has expressed no remorse for his crimes, and was as of 2012 living in hiding under police protection.

In a 1991 interview with Peter Edwards, the crime correspondent of Toronto Star, Kirby stated: "I'm a changed man. I haven't committed a crime for about ten or eleven years. I don't intend to, either". Kirby openly admitted that he felt no remorse for his crimes and that his reasons for turning Crown's evidence were not moral, but rather practical, namely that he feared that the Commisso brothers were planning to kill him. Kirby told Edwards: "I wish I could tell these people I'm sorry for the hurt I caused them. But what will that do? They probably want to spit on me." About the reports there was a $250,000 bounty on his head, Kirby joked: "What's a contract worth? With the GST, the end of the recession and inflation, it must be worth some good bucks now".

In 1998, the police tried to recruit Kirby for another undercover job. When he was a member of Satan's Choice, Kirby had staged robberies in Toronto with another Choice member, Gerard Michael Vaughan, between 1972 and 1974. Vaughan left Satan's Choice in 1974 and in the spring of 1979 had begun attacking women at random in Toronto, claiming that his victims were "loose women" who needed to be punished to "help them straighten out their lives and thereby society in general". On 21 May 1980, Vaughan was found not guilty by reason of insanity of four counts of rape, four counts of attempted rape, four counts of assault and one count of assault causing bodily harm. During his time at the Oak Ridge asylum for the criminally insane, Vaughan had refused all treatment and was described by one psychiatrist who examined him as "cold, controlling, distrusting, narcissistic, paranoid, and psychopathic". Despite this assessment, in 1998, it was decided to allow Vaughan unsupervised work terms from Oak Ridge asylum, which led the police to fear that a violent misogynist and a potential serial killer was about to be unleashed. The police wanted Kirby to approach Vaughan in the asylum and use his friendship with him to see if Vaughan be induced to speak of other crimes that the police suspected he had committed to provide reasons to deny him parole, but the plan came to naught.

In 2015, Kirby contacted Edwards to say he was no longer under police protection after he had quarreled with his RCMP bodyguards. Kirby has expressed much fear of social media, believing that the Mafia will find him one day via Facebook. Kirby stated that he was very frightened when a woman he did not know took a photograph of him on the street with the intention of posting it on Instagram, causing him to violently berate her until she deleted the photo from her phone. Kirby has expressed much remorse for turning Crown's evidence, telling Edwards: "I wish I would have taken a bullet in the head instead of cooperating with those bastards". Kirby believes it is just a matter of time before he is murdered, saying: "It's a small world, believe me. I'm still waiting for a bullet in the back of the head. I'm just waiting for it. It's going to happen".

== Books ==
- Edwards, Peter; Auger, Michel (2012), The Encyclopedia of Canadian Organized Crime: From Captain Kidd to Mom Boucher, McClelland & Stewart, ISBN 978-0771030499
- Edwards, Peter (2010), The Bandido Massacre; A True Story of Bikers, Brotherhood and Betrayal, HarperCollins Publishers Ltd, ISBN 978-0307372765
- Edwards, Peter (2013). Unrepentant The Strange and (Sometimes) Terrible Life of Lorne Campbell, Satan's Choice and Hells Angels Biker. Toronto: Vintage Canada. ISBN 9780307362575.
- Edwards, Peter (2017), Hard Road: Bernie Guindon and the Reign of the Satan's Choice Motorcycle Club, HarperCollins, ISBN 978-1443427258
- Schneider, Stephen (2009), Iced: The Story of Organized Crime in Canada, John Wiley & Sons, ISBN 978-0470835005
