= Yves Buteau =

Canadian outlaw biker and gangster (1951–1983)

- Born: 1951; Montréal, Québec, Canada
- Died: 8 September 1983 (aged 32); Longueuil, Québec, Canada
- Cause of death: murdered
- Other name: "Le Boss"
- Occupations: Outlaw biker; crime boss
- Years active: 1967–1983
- Known for: National president of the Hells Angels in Canada
- Successor: Michel Langlois
- Allegiance: Mongols MC (1967–1974); Popeye MC (1974–1977); Hells Angels MC (1977–1983)

Yves "Le Boss" Buteau (1951 – 8 September 1983) was a Canadian outlaw biker and gangster, known for being the first national president of the Hells Angels Motorcycle Club in Canada. Buteau began his life of organized crime as a member of the Montréal-based Popeyes biker gang and, by the mid-1970s, he became the club's president. He was instrumental in the Popeyes' merger with the Hells Angels in 1977, and played a significant role in establishing the Angels as a major criminal force in Québec. In 1983, Buteau was murdered by a drug dealer with ties to a rival gang, the Outlaws.

== Popeyes ==
Buteau was initially a member of the Mongols, a Québécois outlaw biker gang based in Drummondville with no affiliation with the American club of the same name. Founded in 1967, the Mongols later "patched over" to join the South Shore chapter of the Popeyes motorcycle gang in late 1974.

The Popeyes began working as "muscle" for the Dubois Brothers in the early 1970s, initially as assassins and later on as drug dealers. Buteau, a charismatic tall man with blonde hair and blue eyes, inspired much affection and loyalty from his fellow Popeyes, who were seen as the most violent of Québec's 350 outlaw biker clubs. Buteau was considered to be both a fighter and a diplomat as he was able to maintain good relations with other biker gangs such as the Missiles of Saguenay and the absurdly named Sex Fox of Chibougamau.

In 1974, Buteau and the Popeyes started to fight an especially brutal biker war with the Devil's Disciples motorcycle gang, which was considered the most powerful outlaw biker club in Montréal. By January 1976, fifteen of the Devil's Disciples had been killed by the Popeyes, causing the gang to disband.

At the same time that the Popeyes were feuding with the Devil's Disciples, the club was also quarrelling with the Montréal chapter of Satan's Choice, which had expanded into Québec from Ontario in 1967. On 14 August 1976, at the age of 25, Buteau was among the many arrested at a hotel in Saint-André-Avellin after almost fifty Popeyes had entered and trashed the place. Although the Popeyes won control of the area around Saint Henri Square, the arrest of the Dubois brothers cut them off from their largest supplier of drugs.

== Hells Angels ==
While president of the Popeyes, Buteau was personally courted by Sonny Barger, the leader of the Hells Angels and its most famous member, to persuade his fellow Popeye members to join the Angels. Initially, the Hells Angels had planned to "patch over" the Devil's Disciples, but as the Popeyes had eliminated them, Barger switched over to courting Buteau. It is believed that Buteau targeted the Devil's Disciples at least in part for that reason as he wanted his club to become the first Hells Angels' chapter in Canada.

On 1 July 1977, a number of Satan's Choice chapters including the one in Montréal "patched over" to join the Chicago-based Outlaws, the second-largest outlaw biker club in the United States after the Hells Angels. The Popeyes, Montréal's strongest outlaw biker club, become Canada's first Hells Angels chapter on 5 December 1977. Barger, a legend with the Hells Angels, awarded Buteau his colours and respected him so much that he was the only Canadian authorized to use the title of "Hells Angels International". Barger praised Buteau and the Popeyes as the most "hardcore" outlaw bikers in Canada, thereby making them the ones most worthy of becoming Hells Angels.

Buteau changed the club from a group of beer drinking brawlers to an organized criminal empire. Throughout his time as president of the Hells Angels, Buteau was in contact with other outlaw biker gangs and aimed to persuade them to join the Hells Angels. He aspired to have his members to appear clean-shaven, keep lower profiles, and avoid hassles. At the time, it was normal for outlaw biker clubs to work as subcontractors for more established organized crime groups. As president of both the Popeyes and then the Hells Angels, Buteau worked as a subcontractor for the Irish-Canadian West End Gang, who had replaced the Dubois brothers as their main supplier of drugs.

=== War against the Outlaws ===
In 1978, a biker war broke out between the Montréal chapters of the Hells Angels and the Outlaws. The immediate cause of the biker war was the shooting of two Outlaws outside a Montréal bar popular with the Angels by Angels' ace assassin Yves "Apache" Trudeau on 15 February 1978, causing one death, but the more proximate cause was the desire of the Angels to expand into Ontario. On the night of 15 February, two Outlaws entered the Brasserie Joey bar popular with the Hells Angels, which led to them being thrown out by the Angels. The two Outlaws stood outside the Brasserie Joey, loudly cursing the Angels, when a green car appeared out of the snowy darkness. Aboard the car was Trudeau, who opened fire on the Outlaws from behind, killing one of the Outlaws, Robert Côté, while wounding the other one.

Buteau declared war on the Outlaws, ordering the Hells Angels to eliminate the Outlaws from Montréal. On 21 March 1978 Trudeau assassinated Gilles Cadorette, the president of the Outlaws' Montréal chapter, via a bomb he planted in his car. On 25 April 1978, Denis "Le Curé" Kennedy and another Hells Angel were able to enter the Outlaw clubhouse at 144 rue Saint-Ferdinand and went on a shooting rampage. Although no-one was killed, a number of Outlaws were wounded. On 26 April 1978, an Outlaw, Anathase "Tom Thumb" Markopoulos, was gunned down outside of a convenience store by a gunman in a green car, being killed after taking six bullets through his back. On 27 April 1978, Kennedy shot and badly wounded an Outlaw, François Poliseno, and his girlfriend, Suzanne Harvey, while the two were drinking at the Industrial Brasserie bar. Witnesses described the gunman who shot Poliseno and Harvey as leaving in a green car, which the police found parked outside of the Angels' clubhouse. Ballistic tests showed that the bullets fired in the Industrial Brasserie shooting were from the same handgun used in the attack at the Outlaws' clubhouse. As a result, Buteau changed the rules, ordering that henceforward Angels were to leave their guns at the scene of the crime in order to reduce the chances of the police being able to tie together crimes. In May 1978, a Hells Angel, Paul Ringuette, beat to death an Outlaw, Jean Gonthier, in Saint-Vincent-de-Paul prison. On 12 May 1978, the Outlaws finally struck back when a Hells Angel, René "Canisse" Hébert, was slightly wounded when his arm was grazed in a drive-by shooting as he was leaving the Angels' Montréal clubhouse. The inability of the Outlaws to strike back as the Angels proved to be more ruthless led to Outlaw morale collapsing over the course of 1978.

As part of his efforts to expand into Ontario, Buteau recruited one Walter "Nurget" Stadnick, who had been the leader of a biker gang in Hamilton called the Wild Ones, after Stadnick arrived in Montréal seeking to "patch over" to form the first Hells Angel chapter in Ontario. The Outlaws saw the possibility of a Hells Angel chapter being established in Ontario as a threat. Stadnick was lucky to survive the "Le Tourbillon massacre" on 12 October 1978, when the Outlaws killed one Hells Angel and badly injured another two while also killing two of the Wild Ones at Le Tourbillon bar in Montréal. Stadnick was the only Wild One to survive the killing at Le Tourbillon.

On 10 November 1978, Trudeau killed Brian Powers, an Outlaw, by shooting him nine times as he opened the door of his house. Upon learning later in November 1978 that it was the Outlaw leader Roland "Roxy" Dutemple who organized and led the shooting at Le Tourbillon, Buteau dispatched his "wild man" killer Trudeau after Dutemple and said that Trudeau's number one job was to kill him.

After killing a man named William Weichold – who just happened to look like Dutemple – on 8 December 1978, Trudeau finally killed Dutemple with a car bomb on 29 March 1979. Upon returning to Hamilton, Stadnick had been forced to disband the Wild Ones after five of its members had been killed by the Outlaws and fled to Montréal as a "refugee," as Hamilton was too dangerous. Stadnick joined the Hells Angels, becoming a "full patch" member in 1982 and became their national president in 1988.

Despite the setback represented by murders at Le Tourbillon, Buteau continued his onslaught against the Outlaws. Upon hearing a rumor that a biker gang called the Huns were planning to "patch over" to join the Outlaws, Buteau ordered Trudeau to kill Robert Labelle, the president of the Huns. On 3 April 1979, Trudeau knocked on the door of Labelle's house and as he opened door, Trudeau shot him in the head, killing him instantly.

On 9 May 1979, Robert McLean of the Outlaws, together with his girlfriend, Carmen Piché, were killed by a bomb planted in his motorcycle by Trudeau. By 1980, it was estimated that the Angels–Outlaw biker war had caused 20 murders in Québec and Ontario, while between 1981 and 1984 another 42 were killed.

=== Consolidation and expansion into British Columbia ===
In 1979, Buteau broke the Montréal chapter into two new chapters, a Montréal North chapter based in Laval and a Montréal South chapter based in Sorel.

Starting in 1981, Buteau was in talks with a three-chapter strong biker gang called Satan's Angels to have them "patch over" to join the Hells Angels. Buteau imposed the condition that Satan's Angels first had to prove themselves worthy of being Hells Angels by eliminating other biker gangs in British Columbia in much the same way the Popeyes had eliminated the Devil's Disciples. He also wanted Satan's Angels to purge their own ranks of several members who he felt were unfit to be Hells Angels.

As a result of the biker war that Buteau had instigated, there were only three biker gangs left in British Columbia, namely Satan's Angels, the Tribesmen of Squamish and the Highwaymen of Cranbrook. On 23 July 1983, the Satan's Angels gang joined the Hells Angels, giving them new chapters in Vancouver, Nanaimo and White Rock.

Buteau attended the ceremony in Vancouver where the Satan's Angels bikers burned their old patches to put on new Hells Angels patches handed out by Buteau. Also attending the ceremony were delegations from the Hells Angels' two chapters in Laval and Sorel and from Oakland, California, plus other pro-Hells Angels biker gangs such as the Gitans of Sherbrooke and the 13th Tribe of Halifax. Buteau had declared that the Tribesmen would be a prospective Hells Angels chapter with the promise to join as a full chapter if they proved themselves worthy while the Highwaymen would be a Hells Angels puppet club.

Later that summer, Buteau made arrangements to open another Angels' chapter in the East End of Vancouver, which unlike the other three chapters was made up of criminals recruited straight into the Angels. The East End Vancouver chapter was formally opened on 22 December 1983, several months after Buteau's murder.

The expansion into British Columbia was in the words of biker expert Daniel Wolf "a major international coup for the Hells Angels MC conglomerate. It virtually locked up the Canadian West Coast and made the Hells Angels' position in British Columbia unassailable. Neither of the two remaining outlaw clubs in B.C., the Tribesmen of Squamish or the Highwayman in Cranbrook would seriously consider forming an alternative coalition, let alone confront the Angels by merging with the Bandidos in nearby Washington [state] or the Outlaws MC. Both of the smaller (fifteen-member) clubs decided to align themselves on an associate basis with the Hells Angels". As a result of the "patch over", the Hells Angels had become the dominant outlaw biker club in British Columbia in 1983 and have remained so.

In January 1982, Kennedy and Charles Hachey of the Hells Angels fell into a drug debt with Frank "Dunie" Ryan, boss of the West End Gang, and planned to kidnap his children in order to force him to cancel the debt. Ryan was furious when he learned of the plot and threatened to cut off the Hells Angels from the drugs the West End Gang sold them if those involved in the plot were not killed immediately. Buteau had Trudeau execute both Kennedy and Hachey to stay in Ryan's favour. The crime expert James Dubro stated: "That's the thing about biker gangs like the Hells Angels. They talk about a brotherhood but when they find someone is no longer useful they just get rid of him".

In the spring of 1982, at a meeting of Québec Hells Angels, he demanded that group members quit the use of cocaine. Buteau stated that gang members with cocaine problems were not reliable, as they were too prone to using the cocaine they were supposed to be selling, and he announced that the penalty for breaking his new rule was death. The ban was, however, widely flouted, especially by the Laval-based North chapter.

== Murder ==
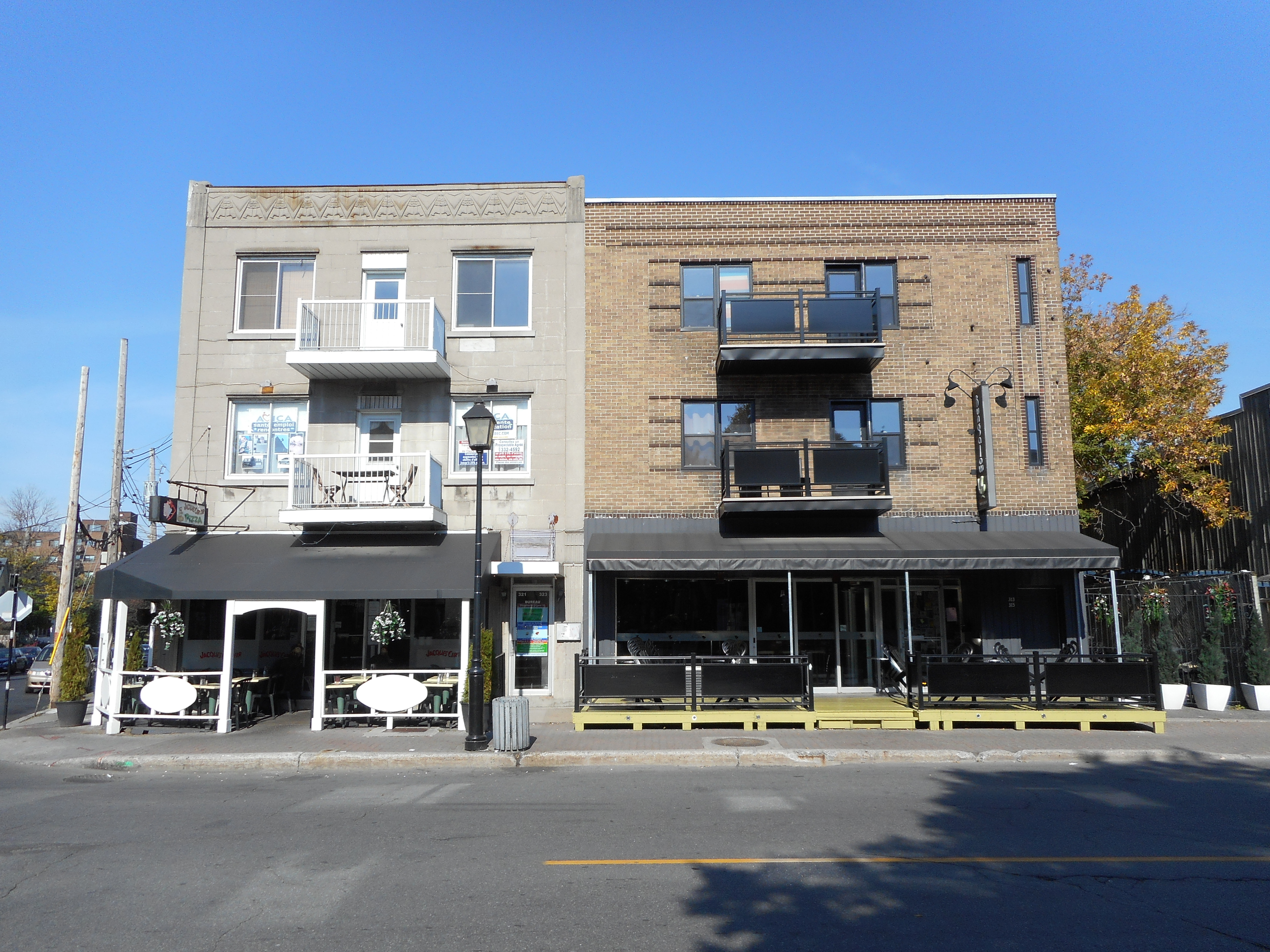
The location of the former Le Petit Bourg restaurant in Longueuil.

On 8 September 1983, Buteau was shot and killed while he was the Canadian Hells Angels president. The shooter was a 22-year-old drug dealer, Gino Goudreau. Also shot and killed was Guy "Frenchie" Gilbert, who was representing the Kitchener chapter of the Satan's Choice gang. Gilbert had traveled to Montréal to discuss "patching over" to become the first Hells Angels chapter in Ontario.

Goudreau was a "prospect" with the rival Outlaws club who believed he would be a "full patch" Outlaw if he killed the Hells Angels Canadian national president. Goudreau's brother was a member of the Québec Outlaws. Buteau had just left Le Petit Bourg restaurant in Longueuil together with Gilbert and René Lamoureaux of the Angels, and the three men were smoking cigarettes in the parking lot when Goudreau ambushed them. Goudreau opened fire with a .38 caliber handgun, killing Buteau and Gilbert while Lamoureaux was badly wounded.

After the shooting, Goudreau went into hiding but was arrested a few months later. He was charged with two counts of second-degree murder but was acquitted after he had claimed self-defense because of earlier events. He claimed that Buteau had threatened him on many occasions and that they had both pulled guns, but Goudreau beat Buteau to the draw.

A day after Buteau's funeral, a young boy discovered a bomb on the route in which the funeral procession, consisting of Hells Angels bikers, had gone past. Police theorized that it had been placed and camouflaged the night before the funeral.

Buteau was replaced as the Hells Angels' national president by Michel "Sky" Langlois, who later fled Canada to Morocco in 1988 to escape charges of first-degree murder relating to the 1985 Lennoxville massacre. Langlois also began a relationship with Micheline Blanchard, who had been the girlfriend of Buteau before his death.

Buteau's murder did not change the fortunes of the Outlaws, however. In March 1984, Bernard Savoie, the brother and right-hand man of the Outlaw Montréal chapter president Daniel Savoie, was killed by a bomb planted in his car. In May 1984, Daniel Savoie and another Outlaw were assassinated while riding their motorcycles down a highway by gunmen riding motorcycles. By 1984, the Hells Angels had "virtually exterminated" the Montréal chapter of the Outlaws.
