= Réjean Lessard =

Canadian outlaw biker

Réjean Lessard (born 1955) is a Canadian former outlaw biker and gangster best known as the man who organised the Lennoxville massacre of 1985.

== Hells Angels ==
Lessard was born and grew up in a middle class French-Canadian family in the Eastern Townships of Quebec. Lessard rejected the values of his bourgeois family and was considered to be a rebellious teenager. Known as "Zig Zag", Lessard was a member of a biker gang known as the Marauders based in Asbestos. Lessard's nickname "Zig Zag" was because with his beard and mustache he resembled the cartoon character on the Zig Zag rolling paper packages.

In 1979, he joined the Hells Angels. Lessard was a member of the Hells Angels Laval chapter (also known as the Montreal North chapter) and was addicted to cocaine. In 1983, he ceased his substance abuse and moved over to the Hells Angels Sorel chapter (also known as the Montreal South chapter). In 1984, the Hells Angels national president Michel Langlois appointed Lessard as his Quebec lieutenant. Lessard was also appointed president of the Sorel chapter. After he ceased his substance abuse, Lessard was regarded as one of the more professional Hells Angels who were more concerned about making a profit than engaging in the riotous bacchanalian excess associated with the Laval chapter, who were notorious for their love of parties, drinking, drug use and sex.

Like many other members of the Sorel chapter, Lessard felt much resentment at the Laval chapter who usually consumed of the cocaine they were supposed to sell. Furthermore, the Laval chapter had two methamphetamine cooks working for them, but refused to share the profits from the methamphetamine sales. Likewise, Lessard was alarmed by the gratuitous aggression of the Laval chapter whose tendency to engage in drug-fueled violence led to frequent arrests, which provided the police with the "probable cause" to ask judges for search warrants of their homes, which led to drug seizures. Finally, the Laval chapter was at least $60,000 dollars in debt to the West End Gang and the Rizzuto family, and had no intention in repaying their drug debts promptly if at all. Both the West End Gang and the Rizzuto family were threatening to cease selling drugs to the Hells Angels if nothing was done about repaying their drug debts.

André Cédilot, the crime correspondent of La Presse, stated in a 2015 interview that there was a cultural conflict between the chapters as: "At that moment (in 1985) the Hells Angels were doing a cleanup to become a real criminal organization. Before that, they were disorganized and unruly. They were like a street gang. After 1982, they really started to organize themselves. The cleanup came in 1985...The (Laval) guys weren’t following the steps the others were taking. They fit the traditional image of bikers. They were always partying, always high on cocaine. It was going against the new philosophy of the Hells Angels. The other Hells Angels wanted to be businessmen."

== The Lennoxville massacre ==
In early 1985, Lessard called a secret meeting along with Georges "Bo-Boy" Beaulieu, the president of the Sherbrooke chapter, and David "Wolf" Carroll, the president of the Halifax chapter. At the meeting, Lessard expressed much anger at the Laval chapter whose antics were threatening the very existence of the Hells Angels in Canada and stated that extreme action was required as the solution. With the agreement of Carroll and Beaulieu, Lessard devised a plan that called for two members of the Laval chapter to retire; allow another 2 members to join the Sorel chapter; and with the rest to be all killed as irredeemable drug addicts. Lessard later stated that at the time "life was cheap" for him and he felt no guilt about murdering people.

Lessard's plan called for the Laval chapter to be ambushed at the clubhouse of the Sherbrooke chapter. Robert "Ti-Maigre" Richard, the sergeant-at-arms of the Sorel chapter, announced that a party was going to be held in Sherbrooke on 23 March 1985 and that it was mandatory that all Hells Angels in Canada attend the party. Lessard had Beaulieu buy some sleeping bags to dispose of the corpses while Gerry Coulombe was ordered to rent a van to take the corpses to the St. Lawrence river. Lessard had planned to ambush the Laval chapter as they entered the clubhouse to attend the party, but only half the Laval chapter attended the party, forcing him to postpone the planned massacre. Lessard then announced that the party would be extended for a second day and that any member of the Laval chapter who did not attend would be expelled. On 24 March 1985, all of the Laval chapter except for Yves "Apache" Trudeau and Michel "Jinx" Genest arrived at the Sherbrooke clubhouse.

Lessard along with 41 Hells Angels who were armed with shotguns and handguns confronted the members of the Laval chapter with their guns. Normand Hamel, Claude Roy and Gerry Coulombe stood outside of the clubhouse, armed and told to shoot anyone who made it outside. Five members of the Laval chapter, namely the chapter president Laurent Viau, Jean-Pierre Mathieu, Michel Mayrand, Jean-Guy Geoffrion and Guy-Louis Adam were all lined and shot. Geoffrion was killed by a shotgun blast fired by Luc Michaud that destroyed much of his head. Adam was wounded and ran screaming to the door, only to be shot down by Robert Tremblay. Viau survived the first blast, but fell to the floor and was finished off with a shot to the head fired by Jacques Pelletier. Both Mathieu and Mayrand were killed by the first volley.

Three other members of the Laval chapter whom Lessard had decided to spare namely Gilles Lachance, Yvon Bilodeau and Richard Mayrand were ordered to clean up the site of the massacre and remove the corpses. Lessard told Bilodeau that he was to retire while Lachance and Mayrand were given the chance to join the Sorel chapter, an offer that was accepted. Lachance together with two members of the Sorel chapter, Jacques Pelletier and Robert Tremblay, were sent to Laval to tell Genest that he could either join the Sorel chapter or be killed. Genest chose the latter. Lessard had the Laval chapter's clubhouse looted, taking thousands of dollars in cash and drugs from the clubhouse along with the six Harley-Davidson motorcycles. The corpses were placed in sleeping bags, tied to weights and dumped in the St. Lawrence river.

Trudeau was in rehab in Oka for his cocaine addiction. Normand Hamel of the Sorel chapter was sent to tell Trudeau that he was expelled from the Hells Angels, but would be allowed to rejoin if he killed three people Lessard wanted to see dead. Trudeau killed Ginette Henri, the girlfriend of Mathieu and the accountant for the Laval chapter, who was the first name on Lessard's list. After Trudeau killed Jean-Marc Deniger, the second name on the list, Lessard rewarded him by having Hamel give him back his motorcycle. Genest proved his loyalty by murdering on 7 April 1985 another Hells Angel, Claude "Coco" Roy, whose loyalty Lessard suspected, and taking his five bags of cocaine he had with him. Genest then went to see Roy's stripper girlfriend, Linda Lord, to ask her to have sex with him. When she protested that Roy was her boyfriend, Genest laughed and told her that he was now dead. Lord immediately called the police to say that she suspected that Genest had just killed her boyfriend. Lessard was not charged with Roy's murder, but he was accused of giving Genest the orders to have Roy killed at Genest's trial.

In June 1985, the corpse of Geoffrion was discovered accidentally by a local fisherman. The police divers then went down to the bottom of the St. Lawrence to discover the other four corpses rotting on the river bed. Lessard suspected the loyalty of Gerry "le Chat" Coulombe and decided to have him killed. On 26 June 1985, Lessard called Coulombe to tell him to come at once to the clubhouse of the Sorel chapter to be promoted up to being a "full patch" Hells Angel. Suspicious about the sudden promotion, Coulombe called two other Hells Angels were also at the "prospect" level, Gaétan Proulx and Jean-Paul Ramsay, both whom said they knew nothing about the ceremony where Coulombe was to be handed the bikers jacket with the full Hells Angels death's head patch. As he realised that he was going to be killed, Coulombe turned Crown's evidence and agreed to testify about the Lennoxville massacre in exchange for a lesser sentence. Coulombe told the police that Lachance was greatly disturbed by the massacre and would probably turn Crown's evidence if the Crown were willing to strike a suitably lenient deal for him. Lachance, who had indeed been greatly troubled by the massacre, turned Crown's evidence when approached by the police and agreed to testify against the other Hells Angels. Lachance told the police that Lessard was going to have Trudeau killed after he killed the last man on Lessard's list, Pierre Asselin. Trudeau likewise decided to turn Crown's evidence after Sergeant Marcel Lacoste of the Sûreté du Québec showed him an article in the Allo Police tabloid based on leaked police information that stated that Lessard planned to have him killed. When he learned that Lessard was not going to allow him to rejoin the Hells Angels and instead planned to have him liquated, Trudeau remarked: "I killed for them and now they want to kill me—that's gratitude, eh?" Lessard, along with 39 other Hells Angels, were charged with first-degree murder.

== Life in prison and spiritual change ==
At his trial in 1987, Lessard was convicted of first-degree murder. Lessard was found guilty of five counts of first degree murder and was sentenced to life imprisonment. In 1987, Lessard met another prisoner, Albert Lowe, whom he credited with interesting him in Buddhism. In 1989, Lessard resigned from the Hells Angels and later converted to Buddhism. Prison officials noted that Lessard lost all interest in material possessions as he preferred to focus on the spiritual values of Buddhism. On 2 February 2006, Lessard was granted temporary leave from prison. Lessard told the National Parole Board that owing to his conversion to Buddhism that he was now a pacifist and a vegetarian. Lessard also stated: "You can't be a Buddhist and be in that milieu."

In 2008, Lessard was granted day parole. At a hearing before the parole board in 2008, Lessard explained the reasons for the Lennoxville massacre as: “It was an extreme situation. The most serious thing that can happen (in that milieu) is an internal conflict". On 24 October 2008, Lessard told the National Parole Board: "By joining the Hells Angels, I was joining crime. In this environment, the club came first. I saw the boat sinking because of the risk of internal dissension. We had to take action. Of course it was extreme to kill five, but that was how it was in this environment, it was the law of retaliation. Today, I know that was unacceptable. I lacked realism, I was in a bubble. The world of bikers was an ideal that did not exist...It was only in prison that I became aware of all this disaster...I am no longer the same man, I have more than 20 years of reflection behind me". Lessard was described as an "exceptionally impeccable" prisoner. On 11 August 2010, Lessard was granted full parole and is currently living outside of prison. The National Parole Board declared that Lessard was "a model of compliance" whose Buddhist faith "has permitted you to radically change your values and behaviour."

== Books ==
- Langton, Jerry (2010). Showdown: How the Outlaws, Hells Angels and Cops Fought for Control of the Streets. Toronto: John Wiley & Sons. ISBN 978-0470678787.
- Langton, Jerry (2015). Cold War How Organized Crime Works in Canada and Why It's About to Get More Violent. Toronto: HarperColllins. ISBN 978-1-4434-3255-9.
- Schneider, Stephen (2009). Iced: The Story of Organized Crime in Canada. Toronto: John Wiley & Sons. ISBN 978-0470835005.
