= Gitans Moto Club =

French-Canadian outlaw motorcycle gang

- Founded: 1967
- Founder: Guy Auclair, Georges Beaulieu, Jacques Filteau and Richard Rousseau
- Named after: The French-language word for "Gypsies"
- Founding location: Sherbrooke, Quebec, Canada
- Years active: 1967─1984
- Territory: Sherbrooke
- Ethnicity: Quebeckers
- Membership: ~20 members (c.1973); ~15 members (c.1980)
- Leaders: Georges Beaulieu (President); Jacques Filteau (de-facto leader)
- Activities: Drug trafficking, murder, intimidation, gangsterism, burglary, assault, hooliganism, homicide, coercion, sexual violence and prostitution (later)
- Allies: Hells Angels MC; Popeyes MC
- Rivals: Atomes MC
- Notable members: Robert "Snake" Tremblay

The Gitans Moto Club, generally abbreviated to as the Gitans MC, were a French-Canadian outlaw motorcycle gang based out of Sherbrooke, Quebec, who integrated into the larger Hells Angels Motorcycle Club (HAMC) in December 1984 to become what is now the Hells Angels MC Sherbrooke charter (headquartered in Lennoxville). The term "gitan" in the group's name is the French-language word for gypsy.

== History ==
Before becoming a biker gang, the Gitans initially began as a Sherbrooke street gang in the mid-1960s who called themselves the Vikings. The Vikings later evolved to become an outlaw motorcycle club known as Dirty Reich MC before ultimately settling on the name Gitans (the French word for "gypsies") in 1970. Headquartered within the municipality of Saint-Denis-de-Brompton, the rebranded Gitans MC kept the same center-patch its members sported whilst being known as the Dirty Reich MC. The flags seen in said patch logo deliberately resemble the national flag of the Third Reich (Nazi Germany).

The Gitans Moto Club became active participants in Sherbrooke's local drug trade. They bought their narcotics stockpile from the Popeye Moto Club, a powerful Québécois biker gang who, at the time, were regarded as one of the most ruthless outlaw motorcycle clubs throughout the French-speaking province. The Popeyes maintained positive relations towards the yielding Gitans, with a couple of its members (Maurice "Le Grec" Auqer and Michel Roy) even supplying them with weapons. As a result of their good relations with the Popeye MC as well as firsthand respect from Popeye leaders: Yves "Le Boss" Buteau and Yves "Gorille" Bilodeau, the Gitans were even able to buy some of their drug stash from the predominant American Hells Angels MC, who sought to expand into Canada and were considering to rebrand the Popeye Moto Club into its all-ever first Canadian chapter. This carefully selected cogitation was highly favored by the Popeyes, as the preexisting Hells Angels Motorcycle Club had already been a substantial influence on them, as well as numerous other biker gangs in Canada.

The Gitans MC would proceed to maintain an infamous reputation in Sherbrooke, controlling a substantial amount of the city's drug trade. Along with their trafficking of illicit drugs, there had also been reported incidents of Gitans members committing robberies, attacking homosexual bystanders at random, gang raping minors and transmitting STDs via acts of unsafe sexual intercourse.

Despite the fact that Georges "Bo-Boy" Beaulieu held the official title as President of the Gitans Moto Club, Jacques "Boubou" Filteau was considered to be their de facto boss who commanded the gang.

=== War with the Atomes MC ===
Sherbrooke biker conflict
- Part of Organized crime in Canada
- Date: 1973-1974
- Location: Sherbrooke, Canada
- Caused by: Dispute over gang territory
- Goals: To become the dominant force over the Sherbrooke drug trade
- Methods: Shootings, melee combat, stabbings
- Result: Ceasefire

Parties
Atomes MC	Gitans MC Support: Popeye MC	Sûreté du Québec; RCMP "C" Division; Sherbrooke City Council: Service de police de la Ville de Sherbrooke

Lead figures
Réjean Gilbert; Rejean Adams	Georges Beaulieu; Jacques Filteau	Marc Bureau; Paul-A. Benoît

Casualties
- Deaths: 6
- Temporary ceasefire between both biker clubs

During their drug dealing operations in the early 1970s, the Gitans begrudgingly coexisted with another "one-percenter" style outlaw biker gang based in Sherbrooke known as the Atomes MC. The Atomes, led by Réjean "Farmer" Gilbert, had roughly around thirteen members and were headquartered quite close in proximity to the Gitans, residing in Rock Forest–Saint-Élie–Deauville. Moreover, the Atomes had further gained a reputation of ill repute after several of its members had sexually assaulted and gang raped a number of underage teenage girls, some who were subsequently infected with venereal diseases as a result. Much to the disliking of the Gitans MC, the Atomes also primarily profited off of selling drugs in Sherbrooke.

Tensions between both groups eventually erupted in 1973, when a violent turf war commenced. The Gitans were reported to have around a total of 20 members at the start of the bloody conflict, but by 1980, club membership was reduced down to 15.

1973 to 1974 would mark numerous aggressive clashes between the Gitans and Atomes. A grand total of six murders would occur during this time. The turf war eventually came to a halt in the following year of 1975 when both gangs reluctantly reached an agreement to share the city's drug market.

=== Hells Angels patch-over ===
1977 marked the year of the US-based Hells Angels Motorcycle Club's transnational expansion from their native USA into Canada, beginning when the gang rewarded the Popeye Moto Club with the opportunity to become the country's first-ever Hells Angels chapter: Hells Angels MC Montreal. Meanwhile, the Gitans MC continued to thrive in Sherbrooke, despite the collective existence of the Atomes MC.

In 1984, the Hells Angels Montreal chapter offered the Gitans with a chance for the club to become their own Hells Angel MC chapter under the condition they could first showcase their might by successfully wiping out the Atomes MC. Taking up the opportunity to be their very own Hells Angels chapter, the Gitans unanimously acted on the proposal of Hells Angels Montreal faction.

The remaining members of the Atomes MC buried their kuttes, formally dissolving the outlaw biker gang for good. On December 8, 1984, the Gitans MC officially became the currently active Sherbrooke charter of the Hells Angels MC. At present, they are rumored to be one of the club's wealthiest chapters amongst all its Canadian branches.
