= Garnet McEwen =

Canadian outlaw biker (1945–2012)

- Born: Garnet Douglas McEwen; 25 September 1945; Campbellton, New Brunswick, Canada
- Died: 27 January 2012 (aged 66); Saskatoon, Saskatchewan, Canada
- Other names: "Mother"
- Occupation(s): Outlaw biker, gangster
- Years active: 1960s–1980
- Known for: National president of the Outlaws in Canada
- Allegiance: Satan's Choice MC; Outlaws MC

Garnet Douglas McEwen (25 September 1945 – 27 January 2012), nicknamed "Mother", was a Canadian outlaw biker, gangster and police informer, most notable as a longtime member of Satan's Choice Motorcycle Club before serving as the first national president of the Outlaws Motorcycle Club in Canada.

== Satan's Choice ==
McEwen was born in Campbellton, New Brunswick and moved to St. Catharines, Ontario as a young man. McEwen always talked with a strong Maritime accent. Initially, he worked as a pencil salesman then a mod clothing salesman at BJs men's wear on St.Paul St. in St.Catharines before saving up enough money to open up a tattoo parlor. As a result of a motorcycle accident, he lost one of his legs, which had to be replaced with a plastic prosthetic leg. As his tattoo parlor was popular with members of Satan's Choice Motorcycle Club, he ended up joining the club and rose up to become the president of the St. Catharines chapter. When the Satan's Choice national president, Bernie Guindon, was convicted of rape in 1969, McEwen became the interim national president, serving in that role until Guindon was released from prison in 1974.

In 1974, McEwen together with Cecil Kirby went to Fort Lauderdale, Florida to meet the leaders of the Outlaws Motorcycle Club. Kirby was clean shaven and had no difficulty leaving the Fort Lauderdale airport as he did not look like an outlaw biker, unlike McEwen whose long hair and beard caused the airport security to view him as a trouble-maker. Kirby described most of the Outlaws he met in Florida as Vietnam veterans who had been unable to adjust to civilian life and who were full of rage and hate. McEwen, by contrast, was deeply impressed with the Outlaws and became the main advocate within Satan's Choice of an alliance with the American club. In June 1975, Guindon formally made an alliance with the Outlaws, agreeing to have Satan's Choice sell methamphetamine and PCP manufactured in northern Ontario for resale in the American Midwest.

However, this was not enough for McEwen, who wanted to pursue the "Yankeeization" of Satan's Choice. The American journalist Mick Lowe described McEwen as suffering from "...the classic Canadian-American love-hate relationship, a distinctly Canadian malady, since Americans never thought enough about Canada to either love or hate their northern cousins one way or the other". McEwen felt very strongly that he could only become a powerful biker by joining an American outlaw biker club. McEwen had an obsession with guns and wanted to join the Outlaws so that he could import guns in mass from the United States. McEwen invited several Outlaw leaders from their headquarters in Chicago to meet Guindon in Oshawa. However, Guindon declined a request to have Satan's Choice formally "patch over" their relationship with the Outlaws, saying he wanted to keep his club Canadian. On several visits to Chicago, McEwen was courted by Harry Joseph "Taco" Bowman, the president of the American Outlaws, which increased his sense of self-importance. McEwen also worked as a police informer, selling information to the police.

In August 1975, Guindon visited a hunting lodge at Oba Lake in northern Ontario owned by Alain Templain, the president of the Oshawa chapter of Satan's Choice. The lodge was the location of a PCP factory. McEwen informed the Ontario Provincial Police (OPP) of the PCP factory and when it was that Guindon would be visiting Oba Lake so they could arrest him. This removed Guindon so that McEwen could pursue his plans for "Yankeeization". On the night of 6 August 1975, a group of undercover OPP officers raided a shack located on an island in Oba Lake and discovered Guindon and Templain with CAD$6 million worth of PCP tablets together with PCP-manufacturing equipment. With Guindon imprisoned, McEwen again became the interim national president of Satan's Choice. In one of his first acts as national president, McEwen arranged for a common "association patch" between the Outlaws and Satan's Choice, allowing for equality between the two clubs.

McEwen was an unpopular national president, due to his "dictatorial" leadership style. Lorne Campbell spoke negatively of him, saying "He was just a fat, stinky guy. That's all he was. He was just a dirty guy who looked like a 1950s biker. He was filthy". Campbell liked to joke about McEwen's artificial leg, saying that he "didn't have a leg to stand on", a joke that McEwen did not find amusing. McEwen decision to "bug" the automobiles of other Satan's Choice members further alienated him from many gang members who saw him as a "rat". During McEwen's presidency, in-fighting between the various chapters of Satan's Choice became endemic and in 1977, McEwen tried to expel the entire Kitchener chapter after some of its members talked too frankly to journalists from the Kitchener Record.

McEwen called a secret meeting with William "King" O'Reilly, the president of the Windsor chapter; John "Doctor John" Arksey, the president of the Ottawa chapter; and Joseph "Sonny" Lacombe, the president of the Montreal chapter. O'Reilly and Arksey both supported McEwen's plans to have Satan's Choice "patch over" to the Outlaws, while Lacombe remained non-committal for a time. In March 1977, McEwen arranged for the Windsor and St. Catharines chapters to secretly join the Outlaws.

== Outlaws ==
On 1 July 1977, McEwen summoned most of the Satan's Choice chapter presidents for a meeting, where he called for "patching over" to the Outlaws, arguing that being members of an American club would improve their image, and that the St. Catharines and Windsor chapters had already decided to join the Outlaws. The chapter presidents known for their loyalty to Guindon were not invited to the meeting. The meeting was not held at the normal meeting place of Wasaga Beach on Georgian Bay, instead held at Crystal Beach on Lake Erie close to the American border. McEwen brought over a number of American Outlaws from their Detroit chapter to provide intimidation at the Crystal Beach meeting. Lowe wrote that the chapters "began to fall like dominoes" as one by one the various chapter presidents agreed. To mark the change, a ceremony was performed at Crystal Beach where the Satan's Choice chapter presidents burned their jackets with the Satan's Choice patches while putting on new jackets with the Outlaw patch.

From within the Millhaven prison, Guindon was alleged to have placed a bounty on McEwen, promising to pay $10,000 as the reward for killing him. McEwen's house in St. Catharines was shot up by the Satan's Choice in a failed assassination attempt. Many of the members of the Satan's Choice chapters whose presidents had chosen to join the Outlaws resigned, thereby weakening both clubs. As a police informer, McEwen realized that the Outlaws would be a more attractive target for the police than Satan's Choice, and it has been alleged by several Satan's Choice members that he arranged the "patch over" to the Outlaws on the orders of his police handlers. Feelings against him were very strong as one Satan's Choice biker, Steve Erslavas, stated: "I don't like to say anything bad about anybody except Garnet McEwen – he was a backstabbing, fucking prick. Mother was in it for his own personal reasons – his own gain. He thought there was a payday for him...There was nothing noble about it."

McEwen's attempt to enter Toronto proved to be a failure as the Toronto chapter of Satan's Choice aligned with the Para-Dice Riders and the Vagabonds to keep the Outlaws out of Toronto. The Outlaws only entered Toronto in 1984 when Stanley "Beamer" McConnery, McEwen's successor as the Outlaws national president, persuaded the Toronto-based Iron Hawgs Motorcycle Club to "patch over" to the Outlaws.

McEwen's reign as the first national president of the Canadian Outlaws was a failure, as the American Outlaws led by Bowman expelled him after he was caught embezzling some $30,000 he owed to them. Fearing that his life was in danger, McEwen fled to Alberta where he ended up working as a dishwasher at a restaurant located in a Calgary hotel. McEwen then became a member of the Chosen Few Motorcycle Club, stating his profession as a dishwasher proved his lack of power. After being caught stealing from the Chosen Few, other members of the gang beat him nearly to death with his artificial leg.

== Later life and death ==
In 1980, McEwen abandoned biking to become a dishwasher, which was felt to be sufficient punishment by Satan's Choice. McEwen settled in Saskatoon, where he lived with his common-law wife Tina Karsten and fathered a son, Dakota. McEwen died in Saskatoon aged 66 on 27 January 2012, a broken and forgotten man whose dreams of taking over the outlaw biker scene in Canada had failed dismally.

== Books ==
- Edwards, Peter (2013). Unrepentant The Strange and (Sometimes) Terrible Life of Lorne Campbell, Satan's Choice and Hells Angels Biker. Toronto: Vintage Canada. ISBN 9780307362575.
- Edwards, Peter (2017). Hard Road: Bernie Guindon and the Reign of the Satan's Choice Motorcycle Club. Toronto: Random House. ISBN 978-0345816108.
- Langton, Jerry (2010). Showdown: How the Outlaws, Hells Angels and Cops Fought for Control of the Streets. Toronto: John Wiley & Sons. ISBN 978-0470678787.
- Lowe, Mick (2013). A Conspiracy of Brothers: A True Story of Bikers, Murder and the Law. Toronto: Vintage Canada. ISBN 978-0345813169.
- Melcher, Graeme (2018). "Rebellion on the Road and Outlaw Biker Clubs in Postwar Ontario". In Peter Gossage; Robert Rutherdale (eds.). Making Men, Making History: Canadian Masculinities across Time and Place. Vancouver: University of British Columbia Press. pp. 364–382. ISBN 978-0774835664.
- Schneider, Stephen (2009). Iced: The Story of Organized Crime in Canada (2nd ed.). Toronto: John Wiley & Sons. ISBN 978-0470835005.
- Wolf, David (1991). The Rebels: A Brotherhood of Outlaw Bikers. Toronto: University of Toronto Press. ISBN 0802073638.
