= Devil's Disciples Motorcycle Club (Canada) =

Now-defunct Quebecois outlaw motorcycle club

Devil's Disciples MC
- Patch logo of the Devil's Disciples MC, as sported by one of its members.
- Founded: Late 1965
- Founding location: Montreal, Quebec, Canada
- Years active: 1965–1976
- Territory: Greater Montreal
- Ethnicity: French-Canadian
- Leaders: Claude Ellefsen; Gilles Forget; Jacques Mercier; José Martindale; Guy Filion; Jose Martindale
- Activities: Drug trafficking, intimidation, assault, and murder
- Allies: Satan's Choice MC; Sundowners MC; Devil's Disciples MC (Boston, USA)
- Rivals: Dubois Brothers; Popeye MC

The Devil's Disciples Motorcycle Club was a Canadian outlaw motorcycle club based in Greater Montreal. Originating in late 1965, the club achieved a short-lived prominence in Montreal and was, for a time, the most powerful motorcycle gang in the city before disbanding in January 1976 as a result of a biker war with the Popeyes, a rival outlaw biker club that would eventually become the first Hells Angels chapter in Canada. The Devil's Disciples gained additional infamy for their assassination attempt on famed French singer-songwriter Johnny Hallyday as well as an internal conflict amongst its members which led to several murders.

There are several motorcycle clubs which bear the name "Devil's Disciples" but are unrelated to the Canadian group, most notably the similarly spelled American club and well as another club of the same name in the Republic of Ireland - which does not use an apostrophe in its spelling. In addition, there is an active English club known as the Devils Disciple MC which are collectively referred to as “the Devils Disciples”. During the period in which the Devil's Disciples MC of Quebec existed, there was also a one-percenter outlaw motorcycle club in Boston which had exactly the same name and spelling as the Canadian club. Unlike those other clubs mentioned, however, the Canadian and Boston groups maintained a close friendship with one another.

== History ==
The Devil's Disciples Motorcycle Club was founded as a self-proclaimed "purely French" club sometime during the 1960s. The group's logo and center patch depicted a variant of the infamous Nazi Reichsadler (sometimes incorporating the Swastika), although the group was not white supremacist nor neo-Nazi. Instead, they used the symbol as a means of shock value - much like many other one-percenter clubs. The Devil's Disciples were also one of the first Canadian outlaw motorcycle clubs to sport the "1%er" patch on their vests - a trademark of American biker gangs.

During the late 1960s and throughout the 1970s, the Devil's Disciples grew to be one of the most prominent one percenter clubs in Quebec, as the province was considered to be a hotbed for motorcycle gangs during the time. The club dealt large amounts of drugs around St. Louis Square - specifically amphetamines, methamphetamine and PCP. The area soon became the city's largest open-air drug market as a result of such. The gang had a longstanding feud with the infamous Dubois Brothers, a criminal organization that was also a participant in the area's drug trade.

=== War with the Popeyes ===
From 1968 to 1970, a turf war broke out between the Devil's Disciples Motorcycle Club and the Popeye Moto Club for control over Montreal's drug trade. The conflict is often referred to as the First Quebec Biker War to distinguish it from the later and more notable Quebec Biker War between the Hells Angels Motorcycle Club and Rock Machine which lasted from 1994 until 2002.

In 1968, during the beginning of the gang war, Devils Disciples member Clermont Lemire was sentenced to seven years in prison for raping a 20-year-old woman who he had picked up Papineau St. and taken to the club's headquarters on Casgrain St. where the act occurred. Four additional members of the Devils Disciples were alleged to have been involved in the rape incident.

Sometime around May 1968, a group of 10 Popeye members formed a roadblock with their motorbikes to prevent 8 members of the Devil's Disciples from passing when a chance meeting between both gangs occurred outside 820 Taschereau. 18-year-old Devil's Disciples member Jean-Yves Picquet was stabbed to death by members of the Popeyes while attempting to get through. The stabbing resulted in the arrest of 5 of the bikers.

Later in June of the same year, a total of over 100 bikers belonging both to the Popeye Moto Club and the Devil's Disciples clashed in a large-scale fight in which chains and clubs were used as melee weapons. Four of the combatants ended up being hospitalized as a result of the fighting. 60 of the bikers involved in the incident were arrested by police.

In May 1970 three Devil's Disciples fatally stabbed Popeye MC member Pierre Boucher. They were subsequently arrested and tried for the crime.

As the conflict went on, police grew frustrated and ordered a sit-down with members of the Popeyes and Devil's Disciples in an effort to put an end to the war between both groups. The meeting between both groups was arranged after a high-ranking Devil's Disciples Motorcycle Club member was killed in an incident where he, along with 49 of his fellow club members, barricaded the Jacques Cartier bridge with their motorcycles while 7 of the Popeyes were trying to get through. The sit-down was unsuccessful, however, as the killings and violence did not stop afterwards.

In its entirety, the conflict left at least 5 dead and 30 wounded with the Popeyes emerging as victorious. As a result of their triumphant victory over the Devil's Disciples, the Popeye Moto Club became the dominant club in Quebec.

=== Johnny Hallyday dispute ===
In March 1969, as the notorious turf war with the Popeyes was going on, famed French musician Johnny Hallyday came to Quebec for a tour. Hallyday was a well-known musical icon in the French-speaking world and very popular amongst the Quebecois people - including the Popeye Moto Club as well as the Devil's Disciples Motorcycle Club. Devil's Disciples president Claude Ellefson even went by the nickname "Hallyday" as an ode to the musician. Upon his arrival in the province, he was welcomed by members of the Popeyes who struck a friendship with him and granted him the title of "honorary president" of the club. They went on to act as security detail for Hallyday at his shows throughout his stay which angered the rivaling Devil's Disciples as they viewed the singer's association with the Popeyes to be a sign of disrespect. As a result, the Devil's Disciples responded by making public death threats towards Johnny Hallyday.

When Hallyday returned to Quebec the following year, the Devil's Disciples stayed true their death threats. On an occasion when him and his band members were eating at a restaurant in downtown Montreal, members of the Devil's Disciples Motorcycle Club shot at him. While Hallyday was not injured in the shooting, this attempt on his life caused him to distance himself from the Popeyes Moto Club.

=== Satan's Choice alliance ===
Even after the First Quebec Biker War ended, the Popeyes would still be at "war" with ex-Devil's Disciples members and its existing club members alike. Furthermore, the Devil's Disciples were also participants in the notable gang war between Satan's Choice and the Popeye Moto Club. The conflict originated after the Ontario-based Satan's Choice Motorcycle Club branched out into Quebec in 1967, establishing a chapter in Montreal and aligning themselves with the Devil's Disciples, as they were rivals to the Popeyes. Fighting officially broke out in 1974 and lasted until 1976. This war would claim the lives of 20 individuals and is said to be the first major outlaw biker conflict in Canadian history.

=== Internal conflict and the Montreal "Meth Wars" ===
External image
- Undated photograph of Claude "Hallyday" Ellefsen, president of the Devil's Disciples

Disputes within the gang - specifically, a rift between members Gilles Forget and Claude Ellefsen - led to a body count of about two dozen murders in 1975.

On May 20 of 1974, the lifeless bodies 39-year-old Claude Chamberland and his girlfriend were founded riddled with bullets in a burnt-out mobile home in Laval, Quebec. Chamberland was the neighbor of Devil's Disciples Motorcycle Club president Claude Ellefsen and was said to have offended the biker in some way prior to his demise.

On July 21 of the year 1974, two armed assassins entered the Fontaine de Johannie restaurant near St. Louis Square and opened fire on drug pushers Jacques Morin and Jean-Claude Arbour - apparently for stepping on the turf of the Devil's Disciples MC.

On October 10 of 1974, the corpse of Ginette Caron was uncovered in a countryside field with a bullet in her head. It is alleged that Caron's death was a result from the fact that she had information about the Devil's Disciples' drug dealing operation in St. Louis Square.

The internal conflict started when Claude Ellefsen and high-ranking Devils Disciples member Gilles Forget agreed to build a meth lab together to produce product for the gang's revenue. However, when Ellefsen failed to contribute his share of the cost, it angered Forget - who sent his associate, Phillipe Beerens, to threaten Ellefsen. Beerens would later be found dead at his apartment in the suburbs of Montreal on January 19 of 1975.

On January 21 of 1975, Richard "Le Chat" Blass and his assistant Fernand Beaudet shot and killed 13 individuals at the Gargantua Bar at 1369 Beaubien E. Blass was killed by police three days later on January 24 following a manhunt. Richard's brother, Michel, would play a key role in the upcoming conflict.

On March 30 of 1975, a bomb was planted and detonated at Claude Ellefsen's residence in Piedmont, Quebec by Gilles Forget. The blast injured Pierre McDuff, a bodyguard for Ellefsen. However, Ellefsen and his girlfriend Suzanne Patenaude were not harmed. At this point, the dispute between Ellefsen and Forget causes a split within the Devil's Disciples Motorcycle Club, splitting the gang up into two factions.

The following month, on April 23, members whose loyalty was to Ellefsen placed a car bomb in the Cadillac of Gilles Auger, who lost an eye in the explosion.

Drug-dealing member Claude Brabant who had recently defected from Ellefsen's side to join the Forget faction, was discovered dead in a rural highway on April 26, 1975.

On April 29, a number of Devils Disciples members who were aligned to Gilles Forget shot and killed Ellefsen's bodyguard Jean-Pierre Aspirot in retaliation. A homemade bomb containing six sticks of dynamite and 32 ounces of nitroglycerin is also discovered that same day by kids at the home of Jose Martindale, Ellefsen's top associate. However, it was disarmed before it was able to do any damage.

A decomposed body is found floating in the St. Lawrence River on May 9 of the same year. It would be identified as Real Girard, a member of the Devil's Disciples MC.

Regular patron of the Brasserie Iberville, Gaetan Poulin, is kidnapped sometime after 10 p.m. on May 17. The Brasserie Iberville is a restaurant in Montreal, alleged to have been connected/affiliated with the Devil's Disciples during the time.

On May 28 of the same year, an assassination attempt in the form of a spray of bullets occurs at the home of Guy Fillion, a loan shark, drug dealer and the partner of Claude Ellefsen. Fillion survived the attack - but his girlfriend, 22-year-old Ginette Pelletier, was shot and killed by the gunfire.

Gilles Forget was ultimately shot dead along with his top lieutenant, Pierre "Napo" Saint-Jean, at the Brasserie Iberville in Montreal on June 12 of 1975. Pierre's girlfriend would later disappear on July 17.

Even though Forget met his demise, the killings didn't stop. On July 20, Joseph Minotti (a Devil's Disciple who belonged to Forget's faction) was gunned down in a drive-by shooting with his friends Richard Boucher and Daniel Lafortune sustaining minor injuries from the gunfire.

On September 29 of 1975, Claude Ellefsen's bodyguard, Pierre Barrette, was shot twice in the head and chest at his apartment in Montreal's Rosemont district.

=== Dissolution and legacy ===
The Devils Disciples eventually faced stiff competition from the Dubois Brothers (also allied with the Popeyes MC) who ended up taking over a large portion of their territory. The gang disbanded in early 1976 after 15 of their members had been murdered by one criminal group or another.

One of the most notable members of the Devil's Disciples was Salvatore Brunetti. He had joined the Devil's Disciples sometime around 1960s-70s. In 1994, he, along with other ex-Devil's Disciples, founded the so-called "Dark Circle", a crime ring that consisted of a group of outwardly respectable Montreal businessmen who were secretly engaging in drug trafficking. The Dark Circle has often been described as Rock Machine's death squad.

In August 1983, onetime Devil's Disciples leader and Montreal underworld figure Guy Filion was shot dead while at his brother's restaurant located in St. Hubert, Quebec.

Rejean Lessard, a high-ranking Devil's Disciples members would later join the Hells Angels Motorcycle Club and lead their Laval chapter. Lessard is notorious for organizing the Lennoxville massacre that would occur in 1985.
