= Popeye Moto Club =

Defunct outlaw motorcycle club from Quebec, Canada

Popeye MC
- Founded: 1965; 61 years ago
- Founders: Michel Langlois, Roger Calve, Yvon Bilodeau, Gilles "Super Gilles" Charette and others
- Founding location: Montreal, Quebec, Canada
- Years active: 1965–1977
- Territory: Montreal, Saint-Hyacinthe, Drummondville, Quebec City, the South Shore, Gatineau, Sherbrooke, Sorel-Tracy, Laval and Trois Rivieres
- Ethnicity: European-Canadians, predominantly French-Canadians
- Membership: Estimated several hundred members between the late 1960s up to the mid-1970s
- Leaders: Yvon "Gorille" Bilodeau (National President); Yves "Le Boss" Buteau (Drummondville chapter President); Yves "Apache" Trudeau (Montreal chapter President); Gros Boule (Rive-Sud chapter President)
- Activities: Drug trafficking, prostitution, extortion, theft, gangsterism contract killing, assault, hooliganism, and murder
- Allies: Dubois Brothers; Hells Angels; Rizzuto crime family Grim Reapers; Gitans MC; 13th Tribe MC; Sundowners MC
- Rivals: Outlaws; Satan's Choice; Devil's Disciples

The Popeye Moto Club, also referred to as the Popeye(s) MC, and often shortened to simply The Popeyes, was a French-Canadian outlaw motorcycle club and criminal organization based in Quebec. At their peak, they were the second-largest biker gang in all of Canada, behind the rivaling Satan's Choice.

In 1977, the Popeyes were "patched over" (absorbed) by their longtime allies the Hells Angels Motorcycle Club and subsequently rebranded as the first Canadian Hells Angels charter.

== History ==
The Popeye Moto Club was founded in the populous city of Montreal by over half-a-dozen avid Quebecois motorcycle enthusiasts which included Michel "Sky" Langlois, Gilles "Super Gilles" Charette, Roger Calve and Yvon "Gorille" Bilodeau. The specific year of the club's formation has been a subject of dispute – but is variously reported as either 1951 or 1965 (with the latter being widely accepted as more accurate).

Inspired by the iconic cartoon figure Popeye the Sailor Man, the Popeyes' center-patch depicted the fictitious character smoking his signature tobacco pipe whilst riding a cruiser motorcycle. Headquartered within the densely populated borough of Le Plateau-Mont-Royal located at 4862 Drolet St., Montreal, Quebec, the club established several additional chapters throughout the province, located in Drummondville, Gatineau, Laval, Saint-Hyacinthe, Quebec City, the South Shore, Sherbrooke, Sorel-Tracy, and Trois Rivieres. At their largest, the Popeyes were estimated to have several hundred members across Quebec.

From 1936 to 1939 and 1944–1959, Quebec underwent a period of socially conservative policies implemented by then-Premier Maurice Duplessis and his right-wing nationally conservative party Union Nationale. This era, referred in Francophone Canada as the "Grande Noirceur", birthed a rebellious counterculture within the province as a deliberately oppositional response to the emphasis that was placed on society's traditionalist norms. Furthermore, countless biker gangs arose across Quebec that were fundamentally based on the values of liberty and freedom.

The Popeyes were regarded to be the most violent outlaw biker club in Quebec, and had a reputation for engaging in violence – part of the reason why they would eventually be selected by the Hells Angels for recruitment. As a way of asserting their dominance as one of the most notorious and ambitious criminal organizations in the country, the Popeyes upheld a strict policy towards other local motorcycle clubs that had logos featuring a red-and-white color scheme. On multiple occasions, they would forcibly tear the patches off of kuttes of said motorcyclists. Some motorcycle clubs that would be affected by the Popeyes' rules included the Zombi MC, Black Angels MC and Escape Hell MC. Popeyes members would also confiscate entire cut-off vests from other bikers and hang them on display in their clubhouse as "trophies".

Roughly none of the Popeye bikers spoke or understood English. The exception to this was Jean-Marc Denige, a veteran member. He had earned the nickname "Boston" as a result of his bilingual abilities and acted as the club's default translator. Having Denige as an asset proved to be especially useful for trips to the United States.

A fellow Quebec-based club, the Drummondville-based Mongols MC (unrelated to the U.S.-based club of the same name), became absorbed by the Popeyes's Rive-Sud chapter in late 1974. Among the Mongols' members was future Popeye president Yves Buteau. Buteau would end up being personally courted by Hells Angels national president Sonny Barger from Oakland, California who was highly instrumental in cultivating the Hells Angels' rebellious and nonconforming image.

== Criminal activities ==
Popeye Moto Club patch, worn on the back of members' kuttes

In the early 1970s, the Popeyes began working as "muscle" for the Dubois Brothers, a prominent crime family in Montreal. Popeyes members initially worked as assassins and later on as drug dealers. They also became involved with the Montreal Mafia.

=== Devil's Disciples War ===
From 1968 up until 1970, a short but violent turf war for control of the drug trade went between the Popeyes and Devil's Disciples MC, another Canadian outlaw biker gang (unrelated to the similarly named U.S.-based club).

A violent confrontation that involved roughly 100 people, both members of the Popeyes and the Devil's Disciples, occurred on 1 June 1968. The skirmish involved the use of chains and baseball bats and left four belligerents seriously wounded. On 17 June 1968, a knife fight broke out between both gangs after a group of ten Popeye MC members blocked the road on Fabre Street in Jacques Cartier while eight members of the Devil's Disciples were riding there. The engagement led to the death of 18-year-old Devil's Disciples member Jean-Yves Picquet, who later died of stab wounds.

In March 1969, French singer-songwriter Johnny Hallyday went on tour in the province of Quebec. As a well-known musical icon in the French-speaking world, he was very popular among the Québécois people – including the Popeye MC, who were big fans of his. When he arrived to perform shows across Quebec, he was welcomed by members of the Popeyes from different chapters. During his stay, Popeyes acted as security for Hallyday at his concerts. Jacques "Coco" Mercier, the president of the rivaling Devil's Disciples, saw the beloved singer's association with the Popeyes to be disrespectful as they, too, were fans of his. This angered the Devil's Disciples, who responded by making public death threats towards Hallyday. When the singer later returned to Quebec for another tour the following year, the Devil's Disciples followed through with their threats they had made and shot at him while he was eating at a restaurant in downtown Montreal. Hallyday was not injured in the shooting, but this attempt on his life caused him to distance himself from the Popeyes.

Later in May of that same year, Popeye Moto Club member Pierre Boucher was stabbed to death by three members of the Devil's Disciples, including Andre Bureau. An autopsy report yielded that Boucher sustained a total of 58 knife wounds as a result of the stabbing. By 1976, the Devil's Disciples had disbanded after fifteen of their members had been murdered by one criminal group or another.

=== Satan's Choice war ===
With Satan's Choice MC being backed by the Outlaws Motorcycle Club, a rival of the Hells Angels, it caused conflict between them and the Popeyes MC, who were allied with the Hells Angels. This led to a two-year war between Satan's Choice and the Popeyes which resulted in the death of at least one Popeyes patch-holder and the injuries of many Satan's Choice members.

=== Additional crimes ===
On January 21, 1976, Popeye members Gilbert "Gros Lot" Groleau and Richard "Joker" Bertrand were killed when the home-made bomb they had built detonated unexpectedly as the pair sat in their car across the street from the Voyageur Bus Terminal in downtown Montreal. The bomb was intended to be set off inside the terminal to bring public attention to the cruel treatment of inmates in Quebec prisons along with the foul conditions of these facilities.

After stealing a motorcycle from a Popeye Moto Club member, Jean-Marie Viel was shot and killed by Montreal chapter president Yves Trudeau in 1970 as an act of retaliation. Viel's corpse was later discovered in a field located in the vicinity of the club's Trois-Rivieres clubhouse.

Montreal police were phoned in July 1970 following a gunfight that took place between the Popeye Moto Club and another outlaw motorcycle club. The authorities later questioned 13 members of the Popeyes at their Montreal clubhouse where three shotguns and a machete were confiscated.

During the month of August 1976, a group of 50 Popeyes members were arrested after they had been involved in trashing a hotel. Among the group members was Yves Buteau.

== Dissolution and legacy ==
The Popeyes were patched over by the Hells Angels Motorcycle Club in 1977 to form the Hells Angels Montreal chapter (a.k.a. the North Chapter), establishing the very first Hells Angels chapter in Canada. However, only a fraction of the Popeyes members were considered worthy of wearing the Hells Angels kutte and gang colors. A total of 35 members are believed to have patched over, the rest being either not interested or not up to the standard that the Hells Angels required. The North Chapter, itself, consisted mostly of former Popeyes members.

Notorious Hells Angels hitman Yves "Apache" Trudeau was initially a member of Popeye MC until they were absorbed by the Hells Angels. At 22 years old, Trudeau joined the east-end Montreal chapter of the Popeye Moto Club, which started off his criminal career. He went on to commit over 40 murders while a member of both the Popeyes and the Hells Angels.

Other Popeye members that later became famous Hells Angels include Laurent "L'Anglais" Viau, Normand "Billy" Labelle, Robert "Tiny" Richard, Denis "Le Cure" Kennedy, Jean-Pierre "Matt le Crosseur" Mathieu, Jean-Guy "Brutus" Geoffrion and Michel "Sky" Langlois. Trudeau, Langlois and Viau all played a role in the infamous Lennoxville massacre.
