= Collins Bay Institution =

Canadian correctional facility

Collins Bay Institution Établissement de Collins Bay
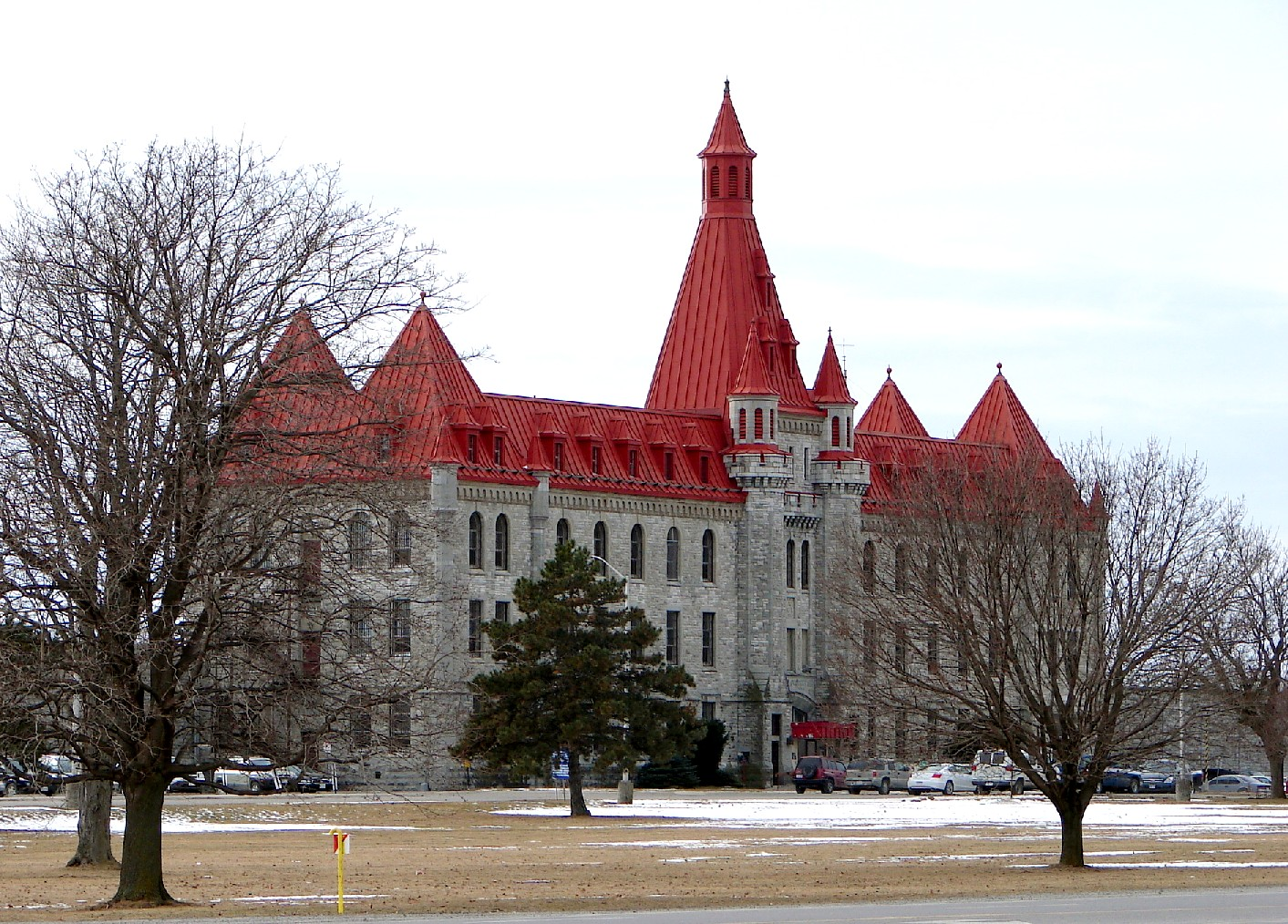
- Collins Bay Institution Main Building
- Interactive map of Collins Bay Institution; Établissement de Collins Bay
- Location: Kingston, Ontario; 44°14′5″N 76°33′12″W
- Status: Operational
- Security class: Max/Med/Min
- Capacity: 700
- Opened: 1930
- Former name: Preferred Class Penitentiary
- Managed by: Correctional Service of Canada
- Warden: Christine Thompson

Collins Bay Institution (French: Établissement de Collins Bay) is a multilevel correctional facility in Kingston, Ontario, Canada, and falls under the supervision of Correctional Services of Canada. The facility was opened in 1930, and is now the oldest operational federal penitentiary in Ontario. The main prison is medium security, with a minimum security facility (formerly Frontenac Institution) residing on the same property. A 96-bed maximum security unit is also operational.

== History ==
Collins Bay Institution was opened in 1930 under the name "Preferred Class Penitentiary (Ontario)" to accommodate the growing number of inmates in the Ontario region. Inmates from Kingston Penitentiary, only 2 km away, assisted in the construction of the new prison. The facility was built to further the government strategy of creating a graduated tier of penalties, that placed offenders in levels of security corresponding to the crime. The main building (A-1) was built in the Canadian Chateau style, and has steeply pitched red metal roofing. Dormers are symmetrically placed across the front and rear, with pointed towers at the corners. The center tower is much taller than the others, with a steeple on top. Local Kingston Ontario residents have opted to informally call this structure "Disneyland North", due to its castle-like resemblance. Collins Bay Institution has a long history of violence, and unrest. "The Bay" or "CBI" has the moniker of "Gladiator School", in reference to frequent deadly clashes between inmates.

== Living units ==
The first living unit (cell block B-1 built in 1932) was a rectangular, two-story structure. It consists of limestone, and has a mansard roof. It has half-circle windows on the outer walls, and cell enclosures confined to the centre of the building. It was the first building erected within the walls of the prison, and signified a permanency to local residents. A further 3 similar cell blocks were constructed over the next 20 years (B-2, B-3 and B-4). The blocks were referenced as "1 Block, 2 Block, 3 Block & 4 Block" by staff and inmates. As of 2014, there are 32 buildings within Collins Bay Institution. The structure of the B-1 building remains standing and is recognized as a federal historic building. Buildings 6-9, which are of a hub-and-spoke design, were added in 2008, and Building 11 in 2014. Building 11 is a 3500 sq. m. maximum security unit that can accommodate the overflow of inmates after the Kingston Penitentiary closed in 2013.

== Notable inmates ==
- Lorne Edgar Campbell, outlaw biker and gangster.
- Gary Comeau, one of the Port Hope 8.
- Daniel Chi-Kwong Wong, conspirator in the murder of Bich-Ha Pan and attempted murder of Hann Pan masterminded by Jennifer Pan
- Bernie Guindon, outlaw biker and gangster.
- Harley Davidson Guindon, outlaw biker.
- Billy Knight, the leader of the 1971 Kingston Penitentiary riot.
- Barrie MacKenzie, one of the leaders of the Kingston Penitentiary riot.
- Jeff McLeod, one of the Port Hope 8.
- Richard Sauvé, one of the Port Hope 8.
- Brent Taylor, of the Squamish Five.
- Ty Conn, bank robber and escapee

== Books ==
- Edwards, Peter (2013). Unrepentant The Strange and (Sometimes) Terrible Life of Lorne Campbell, Satan's Choice and Hells Angels Biker. Toronto: Vintage Canada. ISBN 9780307362575.
- Edwards, Peter (2017). Hard Road: Bernie Guindon and the Reign of the Satan's Choice Motorcycle Club. Toronto: Random House. ISBN 978-0345816108.
- Fogarty, Catherine (2021). Murder on the Inside The True Story of the Deadly Riot at Kingston Penitentiary. Windsor: Biblioasis. ISBN 9781771964029.
- Lowe, Mick (2013). A Conspiracy of Brothers: A True Story of Bikers, Murder and the Law. Toronto: Vintage Canada. ISBN 978-0345813169.
