= Findlay Mcleod Sr. =

Canadian Mail Robber

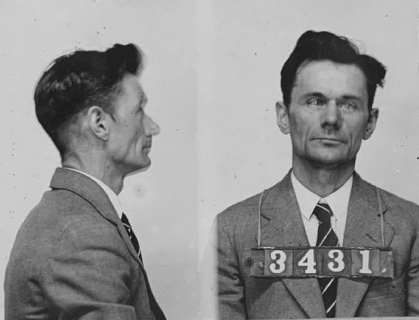
Findlay Mcleod Sr., prisoner intake photo

Findlay McLeod Sr. (Findley) (November 27, 1878 – March 25, 1956) was a Canadian mail robber active in Toronto in the 1920s who later became a prison reform advocate.

== Criminal career ==
McLeod Sr. was arrested in 1923 in connection with the theft of approximately $100,000 in Victory Bonds from the Canada Mail Service. He was convicted in part due to the testimony of his son, 17 year-old Findlay McLeod Jr., who was also arrested. McLeod Sr. was sentenced to five years in Kingston Penitentiary and released in May 1928.

On June 19, 1928, guards at the Toronto Rail Yard were overpowered and held at gunpoint by four men. The men proceeded to rob a mail train headed to Chicago and Detroit of $300,000 in cash and bonds. At the time, it was the largest mail robbery in Canadian history. Toronto Police immediately suspected the recently released McLeod Sr. and were able to match his fingerprints from a milk bottle left at the scene of the crime. He was put under surveillance and subsequently arrested when he met with confederates to split the robbery proceeds.

McLeod Sr. was convicted, again in part on testimony from his son, McLeod Jr., was sentenced to 15 years and sent back to Kingston Penitentiary McLeod Jr. was convicted as an accessory after the fact and was sentenced to probation.

== Prison reform efforts ==
During his second incarceration, McLeod Sr. led an effort to change the harsh prison conditions then existing at Kingston Penitentiary, including calling for an end to the Silent System and changes to the strict rules of conduct and system of prison labor. The harsh prison conditions continued, culminating in the Kingston Penitentiary Riots of 1932 after which many of the efforts that McLeod Sr. spearheaded were instituted.
