= Lorne Edgar Campbell =

Canadian outlaw biker and gangster

Lorne Campbell
- Born: Lorne Edgar Campbell; 2 September 1948 (age 78); Whitby, Ontario, Canada
- Occupations: Outlaw biker; gangster
- Years active: 1965–2011
- Known for: Defendant in the Port Hope 8 case
- Allegiance: Satan's Choice MC (1965–2000); Hells Angels MC (2000–2011)
- Convictions: Perjury (1977); Assault (1978); Assault (1979); Conspiracy to sell cocaine (1983); Conspiracy to sell cocaine (1991); Conspiracy to sell cocaine (2011)

Lorne Edgar Campbell (born 2 September 1948) is a Canadian former outlaw biker and gangster. One of the earliest members of the Satan's Choice Motorcycle Club, which he joined in 1965 at the age of 17, Campbell remained a life-long member of the club, staying on until Satan's Choice joined the Hells Angels in 2000. Campbell served as the president of Satan's Choice Oshawa chapter from 1985 to 1997, and of the Hells Angels' Sudbury chapter from 2001 to 2006, amassing a number of convictions.

Campbell is one of the leading figures associated with the highly controversial "Port Hope 8" case, where he testified that he killed William "Heavy" Matiyek on the night of 18 October 1978 in Port Hope, a crime that six other men were convicted of. The conviction of six of the eight accused of Matiyek's murder despite Campbell's testimony on the witness stand that he had killed him was highly controversial in 1979 and remains so. Campbell's role in the Port 8 Hope case and his life in general has been chronicled in a number of books, most notably the bestsellers A Conspiracy of Brothers by Mick Lowe and Unrepentant by Peter Edwards, and more briefly in the 1990 protest song "Justice in Ontario" by Steve Earle.

== Early life ==
Campbell was born in Whitby, Ontario, the son of Lorne Campbell Sr. and Eileen Chaten. His family was of Scottish descent on his paternal side and English and German descent on his maternal side. Campbell's father was a World War II veteran, who was frequently in trouble with the military police during his service, being convicted four times of going AWOL as he took to leaving his military base without permission. Lorne Campbell Senior enlisted in the Canadian Army on 11 November 1941 at the age of 19, having married a woman named Rose Prest, also aged 19, just before his enlistment. Campbell Sr. was assigned to the Lorne Scots regiment. While stationed in England, he fathered a daughter by an Englishwoman named Doris in 1944 and promised her that he would marry her after the war ended. Upon his return to Canada, he married Campbell's mother in 1945. Campbell Sr. worked as a house painter and lived a nomadic lifestyle, constantly moving from address to address, so much so that Lorne Jr. has lost track of all the places that he lived while growing up. The Campbell family was poor and very abusive, with Campbell's father beating his children on a regular basis.

Campbell recalled in a 2011 interview: "Every time I turned around, I got hit by my dad. He said, 'When you grow up, you're going to learn to be a fighter'... Everybody loves their father when they are growing up. So did I. I was his only son. He wanted me to grow up being a fighter. His heart was in the right place. I think that I'm a lot like him". Campbell's childhood heroes were John Wayne and Lee Marvin as he liked the taciturn, tough, macho characters played by the two actors. Campbell saw the 1953 film The Wild One in his late teens and while he despised the Johnny Strabler character played by Marlon Brando as a "faggot" and a "sissy", he greatly admired the Chino character played by Marvin. Much of Campbell's ideals of masculinity were based upon the sort of characters played by Wayne and Marvin.

When he was eight years old, his parents divorced, and the young Campbell was for a time assigned to the custody of an uncle who ignored him as much as possible. Campbell's father had continued to write love letters to Doris in England, and finally left his wife for Doris. As a student, Campbell had an 84 average with his grades. As a child, Campbell was angry and violent as he recalled: "I fought everyday at school". At the age of 14, Campbell was classified as "unmanageable" and was sent to a youth camp at Bowmanville and then another in Cobourg as a ward of the Ontario government. At the camps, Campbell was frequently and savagely beaten by the supervisors, leaving him with a lifetime of physical and emotional scars. One of the supervisors would clench his fist and use the rings on his fingers to rip apart Campbell's skin and flesh. After surviving the youth camps, Campbell was returned to his mother's custody in Oshawa. Her apartment was so shabby that Campbell recalled: "I was embarrassed to bring a girl – or anyone else – to our apartment. I would never take anyone there, except close friends".

== Satan's Choice ==
As a teenager, Campbell became fascinated with the Phantom Riders Motorcycle Club and their president Bernie Guindon, who would always lead his club in riding down the streets of Oshawa in formation every Saturday night. Guindon eventually became a surrogate father for Campbell. In 1965, Guindon merged the Phantom Riders into a new club called Satan's Choice Motorcycle Club. Later in that year, Campbell joined Satan's Choice at the age of 17. Guindon ran what he called his "fight club" in the basement of his house in Oshawa where he and other young men would engage in brawls. Campbell attended a session of Guindon's "fight club", where he won two boxing matches in Guindon's basement, which led Guindon to personally sponsor Campbell into Satan's Choice. Campbell, a martial arts fan, had the phrase "the gentle art of karate" in Japanese characters, together with "Elinor", tattooed on his arms. In 1967, his girlfriend Elinor gave birth to their daughter Janice. Campbell expressed much contempt for the hippies who looked up to outlaw bikers, saying: "They were professing peace and love and everything and I didn't advocate that at all". Campbell had a reputation as one of the more violent members of Satan's Choice in the 1960s as he recalled: "There weren't machine guns or knives back then, but there were pretty serious fights".

In 1972, Campbell completed a drafting course at Durham College and started a mechanical technician's course, which he never completed. Shortly afterwards, Campbell was appointed the sergeant-at-arms of Satan's Choice Oshawa chapter in charge of enforcing discipline. In 1974, he broke up with Elinor and lost custody of his daughter Janice. Campbell stated: "I wasn't cruel to my daughter, but I was abusive to her mom. I was too nuts, too radical. She was just a beautiful mother and everything. I was too wild to settle down. I was abusive to her mentally and physically. It's not an excuse, but it's a learned behavior from seeing how my dad treated my mother". In 1974, he began to work as an ironworker.

Campbell, together with fellow Satan's Choice member, John Foote, began to work as debt collectors for the Mafia, beating up people behind in their debts to loansharks and drug dealers in exchange for being allowed to keep 50% of the debts when the debtors paid up. Campbell stated of his work: "I collected money for people. I just look at it like they were playing a game. They're not innocent people. They were aware of the consequences. I was totally without remorse. They chose to be in this world". Campbell and Foote usually started with breaking the fingers of their victims as an initiative to pay up. In 1975, Campbell was living at the Oshawa chapter's clubhouse-whose landlord was Bill Stack-with his girlfriend, and he recalled: "We used to screw under the willow tree". The president of the Oshawa chapter, Peter "Rabbit" Pillman, announced at a chapter meeting: "Somebody's fornicating on the front lawn and Bill doesn't want that". Pillman's speech caused much laughter and one member told him: "You know, Peter doesn't what 'fornicating' means. It's too big of a word. Peter, do you know what 'fornicating' means?" Pillman replied: "No, I don't, but I want it stopped!" Campbell was finally forced to explain the meaning of fornication to Pillman and promised no more sex in public least the landlord evict them from their clubhouse.

After Guindon was convicted of drug charges in May 1976, Campbell took a strong dislike to the new Satan's Choice national president Garnet McEwen. Campbell said of him: "He was just a fat, stinky guy. That's all he was. He was just a dirty guy who looked like a 1950s biker. He was filthy". At a party at the clubhouse of the Montreal chapter, Campbell was shocked to hear David Séguin of the Windsor chapter declare: "If I broke down on the 401, I wouldn't phone anyone from Oshawa. That's how much I hate Oshawa". Campbell, insulted at the remarks directed at his chapter, responded by assaulting Séguin, who screamed in pain under the blows of Campbell's fists and begged him to stop, leading Campbell to mockingly say "Not till I'm finished with you, Dave. This ain't hurting me". McEwen and several members of the Montreal chapter in turn rescued Séguin by beating up Campbell, who was nearly expelled because of the incident. At a kangaroo court held at a cottage near Coboconk, McEwen presided over a "trial", where he pressed for Campbell to be expelled. However, Campbell was a popular member and as the opinion of the "jury" was against his expulsion, he was instead demoted down to from a "full patch" member to a "prospect".

On 4 November 1976, Foote was murdered by another Satan's Choice member, John Harvey. After a disagreement, Foote smashed Harvey over his head with his pool cue, causing the latter to return with a gun, which he then used to shoot Foote. After Foote's murder, Campbell continued to work as a debt collector alone while becoming more mistrustful of those around him and always being on his guard. Campbell recalled about one man: "I beat him so badly I put him in the hospital". Campbell came into conflict with a former member of the Golden Hawk Riders and a drug dealer, Jimmy Brockman, who had threatened to kill a member of Satan's Choice. A fight with Brockman at the Royal Hotel in Whitby ended with Brockman pulling out a gun and shooting Campbell in the arm. Campbell followed the outlaw biker code and refused to name Brockman as the man who shot as he told the police his bullet wound was merely the result of an accident. Still intent upon killing him, Brockman tracked down Campbell to the Jewel's Bar in Oshawa and during the ensuring battle, Campbell's friend Richard "Smutley" Smith came to his aid with a plastic ketchup bottle. Campbell claimed that Brockman found the sight of Smith waving about his useless ketchup bottle like it was a deadly weapon that he broke out laughing, which put an end to the murder attempt. As a member of the Oshawa chapter, Campbell sometimes associated with the Golden Hawk Riders club based in Port Hope. He was involved in several brawls with them under the influence of alcohol. At a party in 1976, one of the Golden Hawk Riders he punched out was their sergeant-at-arms, William "Heavy" Matiyek, a humiliation that Matiyek neither forgot nor forgave.

On 1 July 1977, McEwen arranged for several Satan's Choice chapters to join the Outlaws Motorcycle Club, an act that Campbell sees as a loathsome betrayal. In common with the other bikers that remained loyal to Satan's Choice, Campbell expressed much hatred of McEwen and the Outlaws for fracturing and weakening Satan's Choice. The American journalist Mick Lowe described Campbell as: "Dark, dangerous and deceptively soft-spoken". Through Campbell's official job was as an ironworker, it was known that his primary source of income was his work as a debt collector. Besides for his fists, Campbell was well known for using a baseball bat in his debt collection work.

=== The Port Hope 8 case ===
On the night of 18 October 1978, Campbell was consuming alcohol while watching a hockey game at Satan's Choice Toronto clubhouse when a telephone call from Richard Sauvé of the Peterborough chapter was received. Sauvé stated that he heard that William "Heavy" Matiyek, the sergeant-at-arms of the Golden Hawk Riders, wanted to talk to him at the Queen's Hotel (now the Walton Hotel) in Port Hope. As Matiyek had a reputation as a violent man, Sauvé wanted some other members of Satan's Choice to be present at the meeting at the Queen's Hotel. Campbell, together with Garry "Nutty" Comeau, Jeff McLeod, Larry Hurren, and Armand Sanguigni of the Toronto chapter, drove out to Port Hope. Campbell armed himself with a .38 handgun. Campbell was considered the most mature and toughest member of the group that went to Port Hope and had the most experience handling guns. Matiyek who was very drunk kept talking very loudly about shooting the Satan's Choice members present in the barroom of the Queen's Hotel to impress the two Outlaws he was drinking with. Matiyek kept flashing his handgun and saying he had "nine friends" with him, which was interpreted by those present to mean that he had nine bullets in his gun.

Campbell arrived at the Queen's Hotel shortly after 10 pm. As Campbell approached Matiyek-whom he knew-the latter tried at first to hide his gun and then pulled his gun out. Campbell shot Matiyek three times. The first bullet went through Matiyek's neck, the second through his skull and the third likewise. Campbell states that he shot Matiyek in self-defense, saying:

"As soon as I said: 'How are you doing?" he went for it...I totally wish he hadn't gone for it. I've had to live with it. It hasn't been easy. But he went for it and I happened to be faster...It happened so fast that I just reacted. When you see somebody going for a gun and you've got one, with the upbringing I've had, you'll be fast. I'm glad I had a gun...I never questioned my decision. Not once. Not for a second".

Campbell denied that the shooting was a case of first-degree murder as alleged by the Crown, saying that Matiyek was drinking with two Outlaws, Fred Jones and Sonny Broson, whom he could have easily killed as his gun still had three bullets left. Campbell uses the fact that he spared Jones and Bronson instead of killing them as evidence that he killed in self-defense. After fleeing from the Queen's Hotel, Campbell went to the Cadillac Hotel, his favorite bar in Oshawa, to start drinking. During the police investigation, photographs of various Satan's Choice members were shown to the witnesses at the Queen's Hotel by the police, but none of Campbell. The witnesses to the shooting all stated that the gunman was a "big, blonde, bearded man". The police took no fingerprints from the crime scene and interviewed the witnesses as a group instead of individually, both of which are violations of the accepted methods of investigating a crime. Shortly after the Queen's Hotel shooting, Campbell was arrested for assaulting two police officers during a brawl in a Chinese restaurant in Scarborough, which he was convicted of, causing him to spend Christmas 1978 behind bars.

On 23 February 1979, eight members of Satan's Choice were charged with Matiyek's murder with Campbell being conspicuously absent. To spare his biker "brothers" from going to prison for a crime he had committed, Campbell confessed to killing Matiyek. In August 1979, the Crown offered a plea bargain under which Campbell would plead guilty to second-degree murder and spent the next 10 years in prison while the rest of the "Port Hope 8" would plead guilty to being accessories to murder and spend the next 4 years in prison. Campbell was willing to accept the Crown's deal, but several of the "Port Hope 8" such as David "Tee Hee" Hoffman and Gordon "Dog Map" Van Haarlem objected under the grounds that they were not at the Queen's Hotel on the night of 18 October 1978, and should not have to do any prison time.

The trial began on 4 September 1979 in London, Ontario. The Crown Attorney (prosecutor), Chris J. Meinhardt, presented the case as a first-degree murder, calling it "a foul, horrible, planned execution" of Matiyek. The journalist Jerry Langton wrote that the trial was "comical" as some of the witnesses for the Crown "changed their testimony three or even four times... Much of the Crown's evidence contradicted itself". At the trial, Campbell testified for the defense, stating he had killed Matiyek and the "Port Hope 8" were innocent. Under the Canada Evidence Act, Campbell had a limited immunity as Campbell could not charged for the murder on the basis of his testimony, but could be charged if the police discovered other evidence incriminating him. Campbell felt intensely nervous before taking the stand as he felt there was a serious possibility of him being charged with Matiyek's murder. On the stand, Campbell was asked by one of the defense lawyers, Jack Grossman, "did you agree with anyone to kill Mr. Matiyek?", Campbell answered "no". Gross then asked "And did you intend to kill Mr. Matiyek when you arrived at the hotel?", leading Campbell to reply "I had no such intention".

However, the fact that Campbell had once been convicted of perjury led the Crown to accuse him of again perjuring himself. Meinhardt during his cross-examination of Campbell made much of the perjury conviction as he accused Campbell of lying to cover up for the accused. Campbell detested Meinhardt, saying: "He was pompous. Every time he'd ask me a question, he'd turn around and smile at the jury. That would make me mad". The judge at the trial, Coulter Osborne, told the jury to disregard Campbell's testimony. Osborne practically accused Campbell of perjury, saying: "I kept waiting for the cue cards to appear." However, several of the witnesses testified that the gunman was left-handed; all of the "Port Hope 8" were right-handed while Campbell was left-handed. Meinhardt named Gary "Nutty" Comeau as the gunman, who had been struck by a bullet. The same bullet that went through Matiyek's neck was found lodged inside of Comeau's body, which supported the defense. It was noted at the time that for Comeau to be the gunman would have required the bullet to do the physically impossible, namely go through Matiyek's neck and then boomerang in mid-air to come back to strike Comeau. In response to the ballistic test showing that the "boomerang bullet" that had struck Comeau had gone through Matiyek first, Meinhardt changed his thesis midway through the trial to now claim that there had been two gunmen instead of one as he been claiming until then, despite the fact that all of the witnesses stated there was only one gunman. The trial ended in December 1979, with six of the eight accused being convicted.

The "Port Hope 8" case became a cause célèbre in the 1980s–1990s, attracting even international attention. The Port Hope 8 case is often regarded as one of the worse miscarriages of justice in Canadian history. Between 1983 and 2000, the six convicted men were all freed as their sentences came to an end or they were acquitted on appeal. The first one to be acquitted was David "Tee Hee" Hoffmann, whose lawyers were able to prove on the basis of police intercepts of Hoffmann's telephone calls that he was in Kitchener on the night of 18 October 1978 and thus was not in Port Hope as the prosecution had claimed at the trial. The last of the six men to be acquitted was Comeau, who was freed on 8 September 2000.

=== In and out of prison ===
In 1979, Campbell was convicted of assaulting a bar owner, whom he had beaten bloody, causing him to spend Christmas 1979 in prison, which was his fourth Christmas in a row that he spent in either prison or jail. In 1980, Campbell moved to Toronto. He worked as security guard for a stripper agency, stating: "It's the lifestyle. Bikers are outside of normal civilization and so are strippers. That the actual bond between bikers and strippers". In 1982, a disgruntled Satan's Choice member, Patrick "Tulip" Roberts burned down the Toronto clubhouse as a revenge for perceived slights. On 21 October 1982, Campbell beat Roberts quite severely as a punishment. On 14 February 1983, Campbell married his long-time girlfriend, Charmaine.

In late 1982, Campbell's friend and fellow Satan's Choice member, Richard "Smutley" Smith was arrested and agreed to turn Crown's evidence in exchange for the charges being dropped. As part of the deal, Smith introduced Campbell to an undercover policeman who was posing as a drug dealer. In April 1983, Campbell was arrested and charged with selling cocaine worth some $3,200 to an undercover policeman on 27 January 1983; with buying explosives with the intent to do harm (i.e. blow up a house in Kitchener); and with three counts of forcible confinement relating to his debt collection work. Campbell has admitted in interviews that he was guilty on all counts. Subsequently, he was charged with attempted murder for the Roberts beating, an allegation that he disputes. Campbell agreed to a plea bargain with the Crown where he pled guilty to the drug, explosive and forcible confinement charges in exchange for the attempted murder being dropped. Starting in May 1983, Campbell was imprisoned at Millhaven Institution. At Millhaven, Campbell came to know the three Commisso brothers, namely Rocco Remo, Michele and Cosimo, who had been convicted on the basis of the testimony of a Satan's Choice hitman turned informer, Cecil Kirby. Campbell was friendly with Cosimo Commisso, whom he worked for as a personal trainer, but found that Rocco Remo Commissio was angry with him because of Kirby had once belonged to Satan's Choice. Campbell nearly had a fight with Rocco Remo after he told him "Don't be fucking staring at me! Don't tell me you guys don't have problems with your members too."

After serving 14 months at Millhaven maximum security prison, Campbell was transferred to Collins Bay Institution medium security prison. At Collins Bay, Campbell met up with one of the "Port Hope 8", Richard Sauvé, who had renounced his former lifestyle as he had converted to Buddhism during his time in prison, making him into an advocate of non-violence. Through Campbell held Sauvé's pacifism in contempt, he also agreed to convert to Buddhism as he discovered that Sauvé's faith required him to be a vegetarian which in turn required the prison to supply him with fresh fruits and vegetables, rarities at Collins Bay. Campbell's motives in converting to Buddhism were self-interested, but Sauvé did persuade him to take up yoga to help him deal with his rage issues. Campbell also met up with another Satan's Choice member, Howard "Pigpen" Berry, a member infamous for his disgusting antics such as his obsessive coprophagia who had been deported from the United States, where he had fled in 1975 to escape attempted murder charges in Canada. Berry, during his time at Collins Bay, became involved in a feud with several West Indian prisoners, which became tinged with racial animosity and a belief that Berry had magical powers to curse other prisoners. Campbell found himself trying to play the peacekeeper to prevent the feud from causing a murder. Life at Collins Bay improved for Campbell when Bernie "the Frog" Guindon was transferred there as the Satan's Choice national president had the necessary connections with the guards to import his super-sized "Frog Log" marijuana cigarettes, which eased the tedium of prison life.

In June 1985, Campbell applied for parole on the basis of good behavior. Much to his surprise, he learned that he was going to be denied parole under the grounds that he was the leading suspect in 12 murders. Campbell felt that there was much irony in fact that despite his best efforts that he could not get the Crown to charge him with the murder of Matiyek – which had confessed on the stand in 1979 – but was being denied parole for murders that he vehemently denied committing. However, the parole hearing ended with him being granted parole. In 1988, Campbell, who had become the Oshawa chapter president upon his release, served as a guest lecturer at the University of Ottawa law school class, where he spoke about the Port Hope 8 case as a miscarriage of justice, becoming the first and only Satan's Choice chapter president to ever give a university lecture.

In the summer of 1989, Guindon and Campbell led a delegation of Satan's Choice members on a lengthy trip to the Prairie provinces, meeting with the leaders of Los Bravos gang of Winnipeg and the Grim Reapers in Calgary and Lethbridge to form alliances. By the end of 1989, both Guindon and Campbell were dissatisfied with the low quality of incoming recruits into Satan's Choice, feeling that the new members were of abysmally low intelligence and were too far "soft". Campbell stated that in 1989-1990: "There were some violent things that happened. Nothing was done to retaliate...I'm a person who retaliates". In the winter of 1990, a group of senior Satan's Choice members led by Guindon and Campbell visited the Hells Angels' clubhouse in Sorel to seek an alliance with the Angels against the Outlaws. The way that the Hells Angels had driven the Outlaws out of Quebec impressed Campbell. Campbell recalled about the visit: "They listened to us. Even though they had a reputation for being dangerous, there was no confrontation. There was no pulling heavies. They were perfect gentlemen". Through no promises were given about joining the Angels, it was made clear that the Angels wanted an alliance.

In December 1989, he was charged with conspiracy to sell cocaine. One of Campbell's associates, Stephen "Close-Up" Readhead, was using car names as codewords for his drug deals. On 29 November 1989, Campbell talked on the telephone with his wife, Charmaine, about buying a "used Chevrolet" as a Christmas present. The police had tapped his phone and concluded that the reference to buying a "used Chevrolet" was a codename for buying cocaine, leading for him to be charged with conspiracy to buy cocaine. In 1990, the American country singer Steve Earle released the protest song "Justice in Ontario" about the Port Hope 8 case, which features a reference to Campbell, albeit not by name as the lyrics go "And they brought 'em in every single one/Save the man who actually fired the gun". Earle expressed a wish to meet Campbell, whom he met while on tour. In 1991 after a show in Ottawa, Earle went with Campbell to the Outlaws' Ottawa clubhouse, where Campbell met with Outlaws' national president, Andrew "Teach" Simmons, to discuss a truce in the prisons where Satan's Choice and Outlaw inmates kept attacking each other. The presence of Earle was there to ensure Campbell's safety as the possibility of injuring or killing a famous country singer would have brought the Outlaws too much media and police attention.

At Campbell's trial in 1991 for the cocaine charges, he was convicted and sent back to prison. Campbell insists that he really was going to buy a "used Chevrolet" and has said of his 1991 conviction: "That's the only one [conviction] that I was truly innocent in". He found Millhaven more depressing and dismal than during his first time there in 1983–1985 as most of the prison luxuries had been removed to make life harsher. He also found that Millhaven more or less racially segregated as tensions between white, black, Asian and First Nations prisoners ensured that they had to be kept apart to prevent fights, an aspect of life at Millhaven that was not present during his first period of incarceration there.

=== Cigarette smuggler ===
After his parole from prison in March 1993, Campbell remembered that Satan's Choice was "making money hand over fist". On 14 April 1993, his wife Charmaine died of cancer. Campbell, together with three others members of the Oshawa chapter, were hired as the guards for cigarette smugglers on the Mohawk St. Regis/Akwesasne reservation that spanned across the international border in upstate New York and eastern Ontario. For his work, Campbell received an average of some $3,000–$4,000 per day in cash as his salary. The high taxes applied to cigarettes in Canada led to a flourishing black market. Campbell kept guard over boxes of contraband cigarettes that arrived on trucks on the American side of the border and were loaded onto speedboats to take across the St. Lawrence River. Each boat carried an average of some 80 boxes, each of one which contained 50 cartons of cigarettes. The wholesale value of one boatload of cigarettes was about $56,000 Canadian dollars, with the retail value being about $320,000 Canadian dollars.

The work was dangerous as rival gangs were known to hijack the speedboats with the intention of seizing the contraband cigarettes for themselves, causing Campbell to keep a machine gun on his person at all times when crossing the St. Lawrence. Campbell recalled about the night crossings of the St. Lawrence: "There was only smugglers and lakers [ships that sail the Great Lakes] on the water at night. They were just looking at each other". As the police constantly searched trucks in eastern Ontario for contraband cigarettes, the American cigarettes were loaded onto cars that went to either Toronto or Montreal. Unknown to Campbell, the suppliers of the American end of the smuggling network were the Northern Brands International unit of the RJR Nabisco Holdings Corporation.

The atmosphere on the reserve became increasingly violent and chaotic as the spring of 1993 turned into the summer. Certain of the Mohawk smugglers took to beating up constables of the Royal Canadian Mounted Police (RCMP) under the grounds that the reservation was Mohawk land where Canadian law did not apply. Other Mohawk smugglers used their assault rifles in an unsuccessful attempt to shoot down a Canadian Army helicopter that was overflying the reservation. Campbell felt that such behavior was counter-productive and was bound to lead to a police crackdown. Campbell was surprised to see the leader of the Mohawk smugglers, a man he knew only as Dwayne, snort a line of cocaine in public at a local restaurant as part of his breakfast while everyone else in the restaurant accepted this as normal. The cigarettes that went to Toronto were to sold to Chinese and Vietnamese gangs who were most punctilious about the timing, always expecting the cars carrying the cigarettes to arrive exactly at the time specified and would not accept shipments that arrived either early or late.

For two weeks in October 1993, Campbell stayed in Toronto to serve as the security when money exchanged hands for the contraband cigarettes. One Vietnamese gangster, who had once served as a soldier in the Army of the Republic of Vietnam, explained to Campbell that the best way of dealing with one of his men who arrived a few hundred dollars short was to start cutting off his fingers one by one until he confessed to where he placed the stolen money, saying he had a great deal of personal experience in doing this and offered to demonstrate the efficiency of his methods to Campbell, who declined. Campbell left the cigarette smuggling business in 1994 because of the "Wild West" atmosphere on the Mohawk reserve, saying: "I was on parole and my instincts told me it was time to move on. They hated to see me go, but understood and are still friends. I just wish I could have been there a year earlier". Campbell cited as his concerns that the mayor of Cornwall was receiving death threats from the smugglers, someone shot up the city hall of Cornwall at night with an assault rifle while a smuggler from Quebec who refused to work with the Mohawk smugglers was shot in the stomach and left for dead.

=== The last days of Satan's Choice ===
Campbell visited Sudbury several times to meet Michel Dubé, the president of the Sudbury chapter. Dubé was especially close to the professional wrestler Ion Croitoru, who served as the president of the Hamilton chapter. Campbell met Croitoru at party in Sudbury hosted by Dubé. Campbell described Croitoru as a man of very low intelligence, but with a very fierce competitive streak as he would not accept being defeated at anything. Campbell found this side of Croitoru highly ironic given Croitoru's work in the pseudo-sport of professional wrestling, where his role was that of a "jobber" (a wrestler always scripted to lose). At the party, Campbell defeated Croitoru numerous times in Indian leg-wrestling. Croitoru spent the rest of the party relentlessly pestering Campbell to explain how he won, leading him to recall: "He wouldn't leave me alone. That night, he was like a dog following me around". Campbell finally explained: "As soon as you hook, you roll". At point, a rematch was held and Croitoru won, leading Campbell to state: "When I showed him, he almost broke my back".

In 1995, Satan's Choice became involved in a biker war with the Loners Motorcycle Club. Campbell arranged to have all of York Region north of Highway 7 declared a "no-war" zone to prevent the struggle from getting out of hand. In what he considered a personal triumph, Campbell had the entire Keswick county chapter of the Loners "patch over" to Satan's Choice in his garage. In the summer of 1997, Campbell retired as the Oshawa chapter president, feeling that as a middle-aged man he was no longer up to the challenge of leading his chapter. By 1999, he was associating on a regular basis with the Hells Angels national president Walter Stadnick. On 27 May 2000, Campbell married his common-law wife, Evelyn Hughes. In the fall of 2000, Campbell's successor as Oshawa chapter president, Mark Stephenson, telephoned him to say that Stadnick had offered to allow all Satan's Choice members to join the Hells Angels on a "patch-for-patch" basis, meaning that they could enter the Hells Angels with patches equivalent to their current patches without taking a demotion in rank. Campbell told Stephenson: "Go for it. It's the biggest and best club in all the world".

== Hells Angels ==
=== Chapter president ===
On 29 December 2000, in a much publicized ceremony, most of the Ontario outlaw biker gangs such as Satan's Choice, the Vagabonds, the Lobos, the Last Chance, the Para-Dice Riders and some of the Loners and Rock Machine travelled to Hells Angels' "mother chapter" clubhouse in Sorel, just south of Montreal to join the Hells Angels, making them at one stroke the dominant outlaw biker club in Ontario. As a result of the mass "patch-over" in Sorel, with 168 outlaw bikers becoming Hells Angels, the greater Toronto area went from having no Hells Angels chapters to having the highest concentration of Hells Angels' chapters in the world. Campbell attended the ceremony to exchange his vest with the Satan's Choice patch for a vest with the Hells Angels patch. During the ceremony, Campbell accidentally stepped into a police van that was recording the event, leading the policemen to say "hello" before Campbell realized his mistake.

In May 2001, Campbell visited the Netherlands and France to meet European Hells Angels, whom considered him to be a legendary character. Canada, the United States, Australia, and New Zealand bar foreigners with criminal records from entering their nations, but the nations of the European Union allow foreigners with criminal records to enter, which allowed Campbell to visit Europe. At a party at the clubhouse of the Paris chapter of the Hells Angels, Campbell discovered to his surprise that the story of the Port Hope 8 case is well known in Europe and found himself being celebrated as the man who testified that he killed Matiyek. Campbell stated that the British Hells Angels he met in France were "very tough guys". During his visit to Paris, the wife of a German Hells Angels chapter president muttered to her husband in German about the giant swastika tattoo on Campbell's right arm. When Campbell asked what she was saying, he was told: "If you come to Germany with that tattoo or the [SS] lightning bolts, your ass goes to jail". Campbell insists that he is not a Nazi and only had the swastika tattoo for its shock value, insisting he just wishes to offend respectable Canadians. He later had the swastika tattoo covered up, saying he now realizes that his tattoo was "inappropriate" and does dishonor to the memory of his Second World War veteran father. In Cote d'Azur, Campbell met Sonny Barger, the leader of the Hells Angels, which is a great honor in the Hells Angels.

Campbell was at first put in charge of a puppet club, the Road Warriors, that operated in eastern Ontario. Campbell then served as the president of the Hells Angels Sudbury chapter from 2001 to 2006. Campbell worked closely with Sylvain "20/20" Vachon, a member of the Angels' Sherbrooke chapter who relocated to Sudbury. As about 40% of the people of Sudbury speak French as their first language, Vachon faced no linguistic handicaps in moving to northern Ontario. As the president of the Sudbury chapter, Campbell recruited the boxer Phillip Boudreault into the Hells Angels. Campbell serves as a surrogate father for Boudreault, whom calls him "Dad". Boudreault said of Campbell: "He's got a really, really hard shot. He throws it like it's the last punch he'll ever throw". In May 2002, Campbell visited Amsterdam to socialize with the Dutch Hells Angels, whom he described as mindlessly violent men who reveled in mayhem. The Dutch Hells Angels liked Boudreault so much that they demanded Campbell promote him up to being a "full patch" Hells Angel immediately, a request that Campbell granted in a "seedy Amsterdam motel room", where he handed Boudreault with a patch featuring the full Angel death's head patch.

Much to his annoyance, Campbell received a telephone call from a young man whom he had never met who told him he wanted to be a drug dealer. Campbell at first thought the caller was an undercover policeman, but then decided the caller was too much of an "idiot" to be a policeman. When the young man arrived at his home, Campbell asked how did he find his phone number and address, leading him to reply "I Googled you". Campbell did not know what Google was and, upon finding out, expelled the man from his home at gunpoint. In 2006, he almost joined the Nanaimo chapter of the Hells Angels, but declined when he discovered there was much tension between the British Columbia chapters and the Ontario chapters, with the feeling on the West Coast being that the members from Ontario were entitled and spoiled.

On 31 May 2006, it was decided to include Campbell into the Angels downtown Toronto chapter. Unknown to Campbell, the sergeant-at-arms of the downtown Toronto chapter, David Atwell, was a police informer. The wire that Atwell was wearing recorded the vice-president of the downtown Toronto chapter, Douglas Myles, as saying: "Lorne is a great guy, just don't do any business with him. He's no good with money, but he'll stand besides ya in a bar [fight] and everything, and uh he's a great guy". The police handlers for Atwell directed him to target Campbell, whom the police especially wanted to see imprisoned. Atwell later stated: "I had some reluctance about getting Lorne involved, not just because we were friends, but because I didn't think that he was actually a big-time drug dealer. Morally, I had little problem telling my handlers exactly what full-time criminals like Juicy and Watson were up to, but it was different with Lorne. I knew he used drugs, but I just did not the impression that he was all that big into drug dealing". Through a Satan's Choice member-turned-Hells Angel, Shaun Robinson, Atwell got to know Campbell well. In July 2006 Atwell spent a weekend at Campbell's cottage at Baysville in the Muskoka region where the two tried fruitlessly to fish for trout. On 6 February 2007, while wearing a wire, Atwell recorded a discussion with Campbell about a plan to set up a meeting for him to buy cocaine with the intention of selling it. On 20 February 2007, Atwell recorded having a discussion with Campbell about their plan to sell the cocaine he had purchased in Kitchener. On 23 February, Atwell recorded Campbell as saying that he had gone to Kitchener and sold all of the cocaine.

In early 2007, a member of the Angels' downtown Toronto chapter, Mehrdad "Juicy" Bahman, had purchased several liters of GHB, the so-called "date rape" drug from Omid "Mo" Bayani of the Vancouver-based United Nations gang with Vincenzo Sansalone of the Angels' Haney chapter acting as the broker. Bayani via Sansalone had supplied the GHB to Bahman to sell in the Toronto area with the understanding that he would pay him $80, 000 dollars once the GHB was sold; instead the police seized the GHB from Bahman's garage in February 2007 before any sales had taken place while Bahman lacked the necessary funds to pay back Bayani. The debt totaled some $100, 000 dollars as Sansalone had charged some $20, 000 dollars for his work as a broker in connecting Bayani to Bahman. Atwell described Bahman as a disreputable man who because he had fought in the Iran-Iraq war as a young man before coming to Canada was felt to have certain combat skills that made him useful to the Angels, to such an extent that the Angels' waived their usual whites only policy to allow the Iranian immigrant Bahman to join. As Bahman was a member of the Angels' downtown Toronto chapter, his inability to pay Bayani and Sansalone were felt to reflect badly on the chapter who had a "no-rip offs" policy on drug deals. Campbell together with the chapter president John "Winner" Neal, vice-president Douglas Myles and Larry Pooler all paid off Bahman's $100, 000 drug debt to Sansalone and Bayani. On 3 April 2007, on the basis of testimony and wire-recordings made by Atwell, Campbell was charged with conspiracy to sell cocaine.

=== Last trial ===
Campbell was denied bail and held at the Don Valley Jail. Campbell's cellmate was an African-American man, Gary Freeman, who had fled to Canada in 1969 after shooting and wounding a white Chicago police officer, whom he claims to have shot in self-defense. Freeman had lived in Toronto under an assumed name for decades where he had worked as a librarian's assistant, married and had three children. Freeman had been arrested in 2004 after his identity had been exposed, leading to his arrest following an extradition request for the United States for him to face charges of attempted murder in Chicago. Freeman chose to contest his extradition, and he had been sent to the Don Jail pending his hearing as he was considered to be a flight risk. Most of the other prisoners in the wing of the Don jail that Campbell was held in were black, and Freeman assisted Campbell with winning the respect of the other inmates. Campbell described Freeman as much more self-disciplined than the other inmates who respected him for his honesty and toughness. Campbell felt that the decision to hold him with the "gangstas" as the black accused called themselves was meant to be a punishment as originally the "gangstas" did not welcome him, saying that they disliked the Hells Angels for its whites only policy.

While awaiting trial, Campbell was upset to learn his friend, Gerry "Gentleman Gerry" Tobin of the Angels' Calgary chapter who had relocated to England had been murdered on 12 August 2007 by the Outlaws while riding down the M40 highway. Campbell used the murder of Tobin as an example of why he hates the Outlaws, saying that only the Outlaws would shoot a man in the back. Much to Campbell's disgust, in October 2008, Kenneth "Wags" Wagner of the Hells Angels Niagara chapter who had been charged by evidence collected by the informer Steven Gault pleaded guilty to trafficking in cocaine, selling a handgun and having living off the proceeds of crime as the police found $150, 657 in cash hidden in his house. Wagner-who had no prior criminal record-when making his guilty plea broke down hysterically in tears as he begged the judge to give him a lenient prison sentence, saying that he heard that life in prison was very harsh. Campbell said of Wagner: "He's just a piece of shit. He was crying on the stand. It goes back to the saying 'if you can't do the time, then don't do the crime'". Likewise, Campbell was disgusted when Terry Pink, the president of the Hells Angels Simcoe County chapter who was charged on the basis collected by Gault cried in court as he begged the judge to give him a light sentence after his conviction in February 2009. Pink had been found guilty after the wire that Gault was wearing recorded him selling 8, 430 Ecstasy tablets was played in court. Campbell stated about Pink: "I hate a coward. I can't stand a coward".

Campbell's trial began on 13 September 2010 and was to prove to be one of the longest trials in Canadian history. The centerpiece of the Crown's case rested on charges of gangterism relating to allegations of criminal conspiracy. The Crown alleged that because the other members of the downtown Toronto chapter such as Campbell had paid off Bahman's drug debts to Bayani and Sansalone, which totaled $100, 000 dollars, that his action was part of a criminal conspiracy and made the Toronto chapter a criminal organization. Campbell insists that: "Nobody knew about this, but Juicy. It was no club conspiracy to deal GHB. They don't even know what it was". Campbell stated that he felt Bahman was a repulsive man as he recalled: "He was farting from the prisoner's box during the preliminary. He thinks it's funny. I said, 'That the judge that's judging you, you stupid fuck. That's the judge that judging me too. We're facing years. I'm getting double digits if we're convicted, you stupid fuck'. It was funny when he called her Judge Dodge Omni, but the loud farting had to stop".

Campbell described Bahman as a boorish man with disgusting table manners whom he greatly hated. By contrast, Campbell expressed much admiration for Bayani who was attending the trial as an observer from the public benches, saying "I liked his style". Bahman planned to plead guilty to the criminal conspiracy charges in exchange for a lesser sentence, which Campbell warned would worsen the situation of himself and the other accused, stating that he said: "Juicy, don't do that. Don't tell me you can make a deal for conspiracy and not involve anyone else". The crux of the Crown's case was whatever the Campbell and other accused had paid off Bahman's drug debt to Bayani in 2007 as part of a criminal conspiracy on behalf of the Angels to sell GHB as alleged by the Crown or were merely trying to protect their colleague Bahman from being murdered by Bayani as individuals as alleged by the defense.

In November 2010, Atwell took the stand as a witness for the Crown. Atwell was nervous on the stand, saying "I'm a...rat. I've got to be hiding for the rest of my life". Campbell hates Atwell as the man who had betrayed him, and made a point of ignoring him at the trial to show his contempt. Campbell's lawyer, Tony Bryant, had wanted him to take the stand, but chose not, feeling that it would be better not to answer the Crown's questions. In May 2011, Bryant, argued in his summary to the jury: "That idea that someone can only be convicted of the offense beyond a reasonable doubt is a hallmark of the Anglo-Canadian criminal justice system-a bulwark that separates our system from those of other societies considerably less free and democratic".

On 22 May 2011, Campbell was convicted of the cocaine conspiracy charge, but acquitted of the gangsterism charges. For Campbell, the acquittal on the gangterism charges as the jury accepted the defense's thesis that he and the other members had paid off Bahman's drug debt to protect him was a triumph, as he insists that it validates his thesis that the downtown Toronto chapter was not a criminal organization. In sentencing Campbell, the judge added in the four years he spent in jail awaiting trial, so he served no prison time.

=== Retirement ===
In June 2011, he retired from the Hells Angels as a member in "good standing". Campbell admits that he put his biker lifestyle ahead of his family, and after the last trial felt he wanted to spend more time with his daughter and granddaughters, saying: "Before there was always something. Now there's time". In 2013, Lowe described Campbell as suffering from spinal stenosis, which causes him to walk with a cane. In September 2017, Campbell expressed much disapproval of a new club using the name and patch of Satan's Choice, saying it was an "insult".

== Bibliography ==
- Atwell, David; Langton, Jerry (2017). The Hard Way Out: My Life with the Hells Angels and Why I Turned Against Them. Toronto: HarperCollins. ISBN 978-1443450409.
- Auger, Michel; Edwards, Peter (2012). The Encyclopedia of Canadian Organized Crime: From Captain Kidd to Mom Boucher. Toronto: McClelland & Stewart. ISBN 978-0771030499.
- Edwards, Peter (2013). Unrepentant The Strange and (Sometimes) Terrible Life of Lorne Campbell, Satan's Choice and Hells Angels Biker. Toronto: Vintage Canada. ISBN 9780307362575.
- Edwards, Peter (2017). Hard Road: Bernie Guindon and the Reign of the Satan's Choice Motorcycle Club. Toronto: Random House. ISBN 978-0345816108.
- Holmes, Ronald M; Tewksbury, Richard; Higgins, Higgins (2011). Introduction to Gangs in America. London: Taylor & Francis. ISBN 9781439869475.
- Langton, Jerry (2010). Showdown: How the Outlaws, Hells Angels and Cops Fought for Control of the Streets. Toronto: John Wiley & Sons. ISBN 978-0470678787.
- Lowe, Mick (2013). A Conspiracy of Brothers: A True Story of Bikers, Murder and the Law. Toronto: Vintage Canada. ISBN 978-0345813169.
