= Theresa Burke =

Canadian writer, journalist and producer

Theresa Frances Veronica Burke is a Canadian writer, journalist and producer for the CBC's television newsmagazine, The Fifth Estate. She was born in Toronto.

On May 20, 1999, Burke was on the telephone with bank robber Ty Conn, an escapee from the Kingston Penitentiary (one of Canada's most secure prisons) when he shot himself as the police were attempting his re-arrest. She co-authored Who Killed Ty Conn (2001) with Linden MacIntyre.

She won a Canadian Association of Journalists award in 2000 for her work on "His Word Against History", a Fifth Estate production about the life of Steven Truscott, a Canadian man who was convicted of murder in 1959.

Burke has a child with writer Rick Salutin.
