= Jeff McLeod =

Canadian biker

Jeffery McLeod (born 1955) is a Canadian outlaw biker who was one of the Port Hope 8, members of the Satan's Choice Motorcycle Club accused of murder. McLeod's conviction for second degree murder is controversial.

== Satan's Choice ==
McLeod was born into a middle-class family in Scarborough (modern Toronto). As a student at Warden Avenue Public School and at Corvette Junior Public School his grades were outstanding until his parents divorced, which caused him to fell into depression and a related decline in his grades. A talented hockey player who was abnormally tall as a child as he stood 5'11" by the age of 12, McLeod had ambitions of becoming a professional hockey player in the National Hockey League. McLeod played for the Toronto Marlboros, the junior A team for the Toronto Maple Leafs, but at the age of 15 McLeod was expelled on the account of him being too overweight to play hockey successfully. McLeod's most notable character trait was his compulsive over-eating, which led him to become obese and which ended the possibility of him ever playing for the Maple Leafs. He dropped out of high school in grade 11 and worked as a loader of newspapers in the garage of the Toronto Star newspaper. McLeod's task was to place bundles of Toronto Star newspapers onto the trucks that delivered them all over the greater Toronto area.

In 1974 at the age of 19, he began to associate with members of Satan's Choice Motorcycle Club and in 1975 he joined Satan's Choice. McLeod explained his reasons for joining Satan's Choice as due to the sex appeal he garnered as an outlaw biker as he asked rhetorically "where else could a 320-pound man go to get laid?" Many women are attracted to men who embody the "Bad boy archetype" and in this way the obese McLeod found himself becoming a major sex symbol in Toronto after he started to wear a biker's vest with the Satan's Choice patch on the back. McLeod had no interest in motorcycles and he only joined Satan's Choice for the sex. His work ethic declined after he joined Satan's Choice as he was often too hung-over from parties to work and he became arrogant at the Toronto Star office as he become convinced that he was superior to anyone else because of his membership in Satan's Choice. In July 1976, he was fired from the Toronto Star for his poor work ethic and therefore officially lived on unemployment insurance payments.

McLeod denies that he worked as a drug dealer, using the fact that he lived at home with his mother as he could not afford to rent an apartment as evidence that his Satan's Choice career was not making him wealthy. He stated that only 10% of Satan's Choice bikers worked as drug dealers, who jealously guarded their lists of clients, and his role merely to assist occasionally those bikers who were drug dealers. McLeod described himself as a "bum" who refused to work for a living and lived on the charity of others, mostly his mother and his biker "brothers" to support himself. The American journalist Mick Lowe described McLeod as "the very archetype of a big, dumb biker, truly frightening in demeanor and appearance" with his bushy beard and moustache along with his red hair tied into a long ponytail. McLeod's practice of pausing when asked a question led people to assume he was stupid, but in fact McLeod was as Lowe noted "keenly observant, highly analytical and sometimes judgmental to a fault". His practice of pausing when asked a question was seeking to avoid giving a glib and superficial answer by thinking through the question. Peter Edwards, the crime corresponet of the Toronto Star described McLeod as "quick witted" and "far more intelligent than his looks suggested". At times, Satan's Choice presented him with difficult moments as when member, John Harvey, pointed his pistol at his head. Lorne Campbell who was present at the scene recalled: "All he had to do was twitch and Jeff would have had half his head blown off. It was scary. Was he joking? Who knows?"

McLeod's only criminal conviction prior to the Port Hope 8 case occurred in 1976 when he was convicted of making death threats to a Toronto police officer. McLeod had been pulled over by a Toronto policeman who gave $300 worth of tickets for his various defects in his motorcycle, leading McLeod to say "Yeah, I'll see you later". McLeod was convicted of making a death threat against a police officer and had to pay a $1,000 peace bond. In June 1978, McLeod along with his fellow Satan's Choice bikers Gary Comeau, Larry Hurren, and Gordon van Haarlem were charged with a brawl at the Alderville Indian Reserve when they gate-clashed a party at the reserve, which led to a number of fights.

== Murder of Matiyek ==
McLeod was the best friend of Gary Comeau. On the night of 13 October 1978, when Comeau asked for volunteers to go with him to the Queen's Hotel in Port Hope to confront William "Heavy" Matiyek of the rival Golden Hawk Riders, McLeod accepted the offer and went in Comeau's car. McLeod and Comeau arrived at the Queen's Hotel in the company of Richard Sauvé. McLeod was engaged in a conversation with a bar patron when Matiyek was killed, and he immediately fled in terror from the Queens Hotel via the exit to John Street. McLeod was not entirely certain who was shot or who had fired the shots, and instead fled as fast as possible when he heard a gun being fired. As he sat in the back of Comeau's car, he kept saying: "I didn't do nothin' I didn't do nothin'".

== Arrest ==
McLeod was first tagged as a suspect when one of the witnesses to the murder, the waitress Cathy Cotgrave, picked him his photograph out of the photo array presented to her by Constable Donald Denis of the Ontario Provincial Police. On 10 November 1978, McLeod was interviewed by Constable Colin Cousens. McLeod denied knowing who Matiyek was or anything about the murder, and claimed not have been in Port Hope on the night of the murder. On 5 December 1978, the police obtained an arrest warrant for McLeod on charges of first-degree murder and conspiracy to commit murder. On 6 December 1978, McLeod was at the Scarborough Mid-Centre Youth Arena when Comeau informed him of the arrest of David George Hoffman in Kitchener, which caused both much mirth. Afterwards, McLeod and Comeau went to the Satan's Choice Toronto clubhouse where both men were arrested. The Toronto police smashed their way by having a truck pull out the steel door of the Toronto clubhouse. Terry Hall of the OPP's Special Squad personally arrested McLeod. Along with McLeod, Hurren, and Comeau were both arrested at the clubhouse. McLeod was taken to the OPP's headquarters where he and another Satan's Choice biker Larry Hurren were left in a car with the key in the ignition. McLeod believes that the police wanted him to try to escape to provide an excuse to kill both him and Hurren. Afterwards, McLeod was taken to Port Hope to be held in the county jail.

On 18 December 1978 at a bail hearing at Osgoode Hall, McLeod was denied bail because of his lack of employment and ordered to remain in jail until his trial. McLeod hired as his lawyer the former Crown Attorney Bruce Affleck to serve as his defense counsel. Affleck, a man with a genius level IQ had been a successful Crown Attorney lauded as the most able prosecutor in Canada had shocked many with his sudden decision in 1977 to work as a defense lawyer. McLeod hired Affleck as his lawyer under the grounds that a who had so successful in convicting Satan's Choice bikers was the best man to secure their acquittal. Affleck also knew and had a rivalry with the Crown Attorney who was to prosecute the Port Hope 8, Chris Meinhardt, which was a bonus from McLeod's viewpoint. Meinhardt whose nickname was "Chris Mean Heart" was one of the most hated Crown Attorneys in Ontario who was known for his ruthless methods in winning cases. Affleck suspected that the room in the Cobourg jail where he met McLeod was bugged and as such he communicated with his client via notes. McLeod felt that Affleck was optimistic in his appraisal about his chances of winning an acquittal even though Affleck had often warned him: "Look, this is major league stuff. Murder One. We can't screw around". Affleck came to have a strong dislike for his client who provided him with a false alibi that he was in Kitchener on the night of the murder, a line of defense that Affleck refused to take under the grounds that it was a lie. Affleck told McLeod that as a bencher of the Law Society of Upper Canada, he could not present such a dishonest defense in court. At McLeod's insistence, Affleck served as the lead defense counsel in the trial of Regina vs. McLeod, et. On 4 February 1979 McLeod along with Comeau, van Haarlem, and Hurren were convicted of unlawful assembly with regard to the brawl on the Alderville First Nation reserve and sentenced to 2 years of probation.

At the preliminary hearing (the Canadian equivalent of a grand jury), Affleck questioned the Crown witness, the waitress Cathy Cotgrave, who managed to confuse Comeau and McLeod in her recollections. Cotgrave did not know the difference between a pistol and a revolver, and once the differences were explained to her, she identified the murder weapon as a pistol. However, there were spent casting found at the crime scene, which proved that the murder weapon was a revolver. Cotgrave first testified that Matiyek had a gun on the night of the murder, and then changed her testimony later that day to say he had no gun. Another witness for the Crown, Susan Foote, identified McLeod by name as being present at the time of the murder, but she admitted under cross-examination that she could have confused someone else with McLeod, and that she had learned his name after reading the newspapers instead of knowing it beforehand as she first testified to. On 23 February 1979, McLeod declined the opportunity to speak in his defense.

== Trial ==
The trial for the Port Hope 8 began in London, Ontario on 4 September 1979. The Crown Attorney at the trial, Chris Meinhardt, presented the case as a first-degree murder, calling it "a foul, horrible, planned execution." Meinhardt argued that there had been a conspiracy to kill Matiyek and all of the accused were equally guilty. The thesis presented by the Crown was that Comeau had killed Matiyek while the others at the Queen's Hotel were there to block the exists. McLeod chose not to testify in his defense. Affleck, regarded as the most able of the defense lawyers, had been kept in the dark by McLeod about what had happened at the Queen's Hotel as he continued to stick to his claims to have been in Kitchener on the night of the murder, which hampered Affleck's ability to defend him. McLeod produced two women who backed up his alibi of being in Kitchener, but Affleck felt that the two women were such "absolute bimbos" as he phrased it that Meinhardt would have no difficulty in discrediting them during his cross-examination. All that Affleck knew about what happened at the Queen's Hotel was based on what he read in the newspapers and in the Crown's disclosure of evidence, and for the most part he had to operate in the dark. Some controversy ensured when it emerged that Affleck was not just being paid by Legal-Aid to serve as McLeod's defense counsel, but was being paid directly by Satan's Choice, having some $18, 000 in cash in a brown paper bag delivered to him in his Oshawa office.

During the trial, one of the Crown's witnesses, Susan Foot, named McLeod as one of the killers present as she testified that she had seen McLeod "standing in front of the Matiyek table...just before the shooting...There was people mingling around in the bar and just before the shooting it seemed they started heading towards the table". Under questioning from Meinhardt, Foote pointed out David George Hoffman, Merv Blaker, Gary Comeau, Richard Sauvé, and Larry Hurren as the Satan's Choice bikers present at the time of the murder who were now in the courtroom. Under cross-examination from Affleck, Foote conceded that she did not know McLeod by name at the time of the murder as she had first claimed, and that she only learned what McLeod's name was after seeing his picture in the newspapers after his arrest in December 1978. However, Foote still maintained that she had known McLeod very well since at least 1974 and she instantly recognized him by sight when he arrived at the Queen's Hotel on 18 October 1978. Affleck in his cross-examination noted that Foote in her testimony at the preliminary hearing had not mentioned seeing McLeod as one of the bikers who entered the Queen's Hotel via the back door, but was now claiming she did. Affleck read out her testimony at the preliminary hearing when she testified she was "pretty sure" she had seen McLeod at various Satan's Choice parties "but I can't say for sure", which contradicted her testimony at the trial that she knew for certain who McLeod was in October 1978. Affleck made much of Foote's claim she had seen McLeod at Satan's Choice parties starting sometime in 1973 or 1974 when McLeod had only joined Satan's Choice in 1975. When Affleck suggested that if McLeod had not been a member of Satan's Choice that would have affected her memory of events, saying: "If I were to suggest to you that Mr. McLeod was not a member of the Satan's Choice four years prior to October 18, would that affect your story?" Foote conceded "Yes, it would, but I know that I have seen him four or five years ago". Cotgrave testified that she saw Comeau kill Matiyek. She described Comeau as a man with thinning red hair, a description that matched McLeod, not Comeau who had blond hair that was not thinning. When Cotgrave was asked to point out Comeau in the courtroom, she pointed to McLeod and identified him as Comeau.

During the trial, only two of the Crown's witnesses identified McLeod as being present at the murder and none indicated that he had actually played a role in the murder. Midway through the trial, Meinhardt who seemed to have some doubts about his ability to win convictions offered a plea bargain under which the accused would plea guilty in exchange for prison sentences ranging from 14 years to 4 years. McLeod favored accepting the Crown's deal, but objected when the demand was made that he sign a statement saying the murder of Matiyek was the premediated start of a biker war. The most dramatic witness forced to the stand by Affleck was Campbell who on 25 October 1979 testified that he had killed Matiyek. Terry O'Hara, the lawyer for Merv Blaker, wanted his client along with McLeod to testify in the trial as he noted that juries tend to be suspicious of defendants who do not testify in their defense, but Affleck was opposed to having McLeod take the stand under the grounds that he was too stupid to handle a cross-examination. O'Hara visited McLeod in jail and subjected him to a mock cross-examination, which McLeod held up to well. Despite the results of the mock cross-examination, Affleck was still opposed to having McLeod testify as he still felt he was too stupid for a cross-examination, a viewpoint that O'Hara was opposed to. O'Hara felt that the high school drop-out McLeod might had looked like a stereotypically stupid outlaw biker, but that he had a "first class mind", an interpretation of McLeod's intelligence that Affleck did not share.

In his final submission to the jury, Affleck noted that only two of the Crown's witnesses, namely Foote and Cotgrave, had identified McLeod as being present at the Queen's Hotel. Affleck noted the differences between Foote's testimony at the preliminary hearing when she testified that may had known who McLeod was vs. her present insistence had she instantly recognized on sight in October 1978. Affleck noted the only other witness who had identified McLeod as being in the Queen's Hotel was Cotgrave who had mixed up McLeod with Comeau and had testified she had seen Comeau shot Matiyek. Affleck noted that the so-called "boomerang bullet" that had been pulled out of Comeau's arm had proved that Comeau had not shot Matiyek and "we now know that Gary Comeau, positively identified as the gunman, was not the gunman at all". Speaking of his own experience as a Crown Attorney, Affleck stated that eyewitness identification was well known as the weakest of all evidence in a trial, and Cotgrave's testimony could not be trusted on the account of her errors in her memory. Affleck stated that the Crown had failed to produce any evidence that McLeod had gone to the Queen's Hotel with the intention of killing Matiyek, and it would be "inane and foolish" for Satan's Choice to send in a hit team that included Blaker and Sauvé-both of whom were known by name to the Queen's Hotel staff-to perform a murder. Affleck concluded: "It isn't enough for your to say 'well, I think he was probably there...I think he could have been there'. You must be able to say 'He was there and he is guilty and of that I am morally certain'". In his final submission to the jury, Meinhardt stated that under English common law (which is the legal system used in Canada) "all those who conspired to do it [murder], who helped to do it in any way are all equally guilty of murder". Meinhardt stated that it did not matter if McLeod had not killed Matiyek because he was a part of a conspiracy to kill Matiyek by blocking the exits, and therefore McLeod was just as guilty as the man who actually pulled the trigger. Meinhardt noted that both Cotgrave and Foote had testified that McLeod was one of the Satan's Choice bikers present in the Queen's Hotel when Matiyek and for that reason McLeod was guilty of murder. On 24 November 1979, McLeod was found guilty of second degree murder and was sentenced to life in prison. McLeod had been playing with a white dice as he waited for the jury's verdict and he was found guilty had placed the dice with the number one facing upwards.

== In prison ==
McLeod was first held at Kingston Penitentiary, a prison that he hated. Afterwards, he was transferred to Millhaven Institution. McLeod described Millhaven as a harsh prison dominated by cliques. McLeod constantly had to face challenges from prisoners he called "boobirds", prisoners who tried to dominate weaker prisoners by humiliating, beating and raping them, and McLeod learned that swift and blinding violence was the only way to deter such prisoners from expressing interest in himself. McLeod formed a clique with Satan's Choice prisoners for his own protection. McLeod described Millhaven as a harsh prison whose population was divided into two groups-the weak and the strong with the former being mercilessly exploited and dominated by the latter. Along with Richard Sauvé, Larry Hurren, Gary Comeau and Bernie Guindon, McLeod played for the Millhaven Bulldogs, the Satan's Choice prison hockey team. To escape the oppressive boredom of the prison, McLeod began to read books and became the clerk of the prison school.

For his appeal of the verdict, McLeod was defended by the lawyer Eddie Greenspan. The Ontario Court of Appeal rejected the appeal. McLeod resolved to earn a university degree while in prison as he felt it would save him from going insane. McLeod was transferred to the Collins Bay Institution medium security prison where he enrolled as a student via correspondence with Queens's University. McLeod was regarded as a "model inmate" who was granted limited day parole for four hours per day starting in 1983. While in prison, he learned to control his over-eating and lost weight, going from 325 pounds to 190 pounds. In 1984, he became the Assistant Coordinator at the Collins Bay Exceptional People's Olympiad, a series of games for intellectually disabled children held every summer in the Collins Bay prison yard. McLeod found himself enjoying the Olympiad as for the first time in his life he was doing something for other people rather than his own selfish desires. At Collins Bay, McLeod was joined by Campbell who reflecting the traditional rivalry between Satan's Choice and the Outlaws was keen to beat imprisoned Outlaws, especially David Séguin, a Satan's Choice biker turned Outlaw who been killed three members of the Chosen Few gang in 1983. McLeod pleaded with Campbell not to do so, saying that the Outlaws would retaliate, and pointed that Comeau and Sauvé were serving life sentences. MeLeod told Campbell: "You've got to think of Rick and Gary. They're doing 'the book': life-twenty five". In a racial incident, an imprisoned Satan's Choice biker, Howard "Pigpen" Berry, was stabbed by a black prisoner. Campbell joined by Comeau, Sauvé, McLeod, Larry Vallentyne, and Paul Rogers of Satan's Choice confronted the black prisoners armed with baseball bats. The meeting ended with the black prisoners being warned that if another of their group was to stab a Satan's Choice biker, a policy of collective vengeance would follow. Campbell and McLeod frequently jogged together as Campbell encouraged him to lose weight.

His full request for full parole was refused in 1985 as he told the National Parole Board that it was Lorne Edgar Campbell who killed Matiyek instead of Comeau, which was not the answer that the National Parole Board wanted to hear. The refusal of the National Parole Board to grant full parole to McLeod despite his "model inmate" status became the source of much controversy in the 1980s. In particular, the reason given as to why McLeod's request for full parole were refused, namely he was an outlaw biker who was a "model inmate", which proved not that McLeod had rehabilitated himself from a life of criminality, but instead that he was still a criminal who was very successful in manipulating the system for his own benefit as being an example of "Catch-22" reasoning. McLeod and his supporters felt that the fact he was successful in rehabilitating himself was being used as a reason to deny him parole because it proved he was still a dangerous criminal to be highly unjust.

In 1986, McLeod was granted day parole to allow him to attend classes at Queen's University. McLeod felt out of place at Queen's University as he attended classes at day and every evening he returned to Collins Bay prison. He bitterly noted that for reading week his classmates went to Florida for vacations while he was trapped in the dismal confines of Collins Bay. In 1987, he graduated with a honors degree in psychology from Queen's University. In an interview taken shortly before he was awarded his BA, McLeod praised Sauvé and Comeau as he stated: "because of Ricky and Nutty, I could have never done the time they're doing, I could never had handled it the way they have. I think I would have killed myself by now. How they're done it, I'll never know." McLeod was released on full parole in 1989. As one of his parole conditions, he had to resign from Satan's Choice. He had vanished by 2013, never to be heard or seen from again.

== Books ==
- Edwards, Peter (2013). Unrepentant The Strange and (Sometimes) Terrible Life of Lorne Campbell, Satan's Choice and Hells Angels Biker. Toronto: Vintage Canada. ISBN 9780307362575.
- Lowe, Mick (2013). A Conspiracy of Brothers: A True Story of Bikers, Murder and the Law. Toronto: Vintage Canada. ISBN 978-0345813169.
