= Millhaven Institution =

Canadian correctional facility

- Interactive map of Millhaven Institution
- Location: Millhaven, Ontario; 44.1973°N 76.7523°W
- Status: Operational
- Security class: Maximum security
- Capacity: 413
- Opened: 1971
- Managed by: Corrections Canada
- Warden: Mike Jensen

Millhaven Institution (French: Établissement de Millhaven) is a maximum security prison located in Bath, Ontario. Approximately 500 inmates are incarcerated at Millhaven.

Opened in 1971, Millhaven was originally built to replace Ontario's other aging maximum security prison, Kingston Penitentiary in Kingston Ontario. A riot at Kingston Penitentiary forced Millhaven to open prematurely. During the period of 1977–1984, a Special Handling Unit (SHU) operated at Millhaven, alongside its general maximum-security population. A new Canada-wide Special Handling Unit was subsequently opened in Sainte-Anne-des-Plaines Quebec, and the Millhaven SHU was closed.

Millhaven also housed the federal inmate intake and assessment unit for the Ontario region, the Millhaven Assessment Unit (MAU), until 2013, when the assessment unit was moved to Joyceville Institution, now Joyceville Assessment Unit (JAU), in order to facilitate the closing of Kingston Penitentiary. Federal parole violators were returned to MAU from whichever Ontario region they were arrested in, to appear in front of the National Parole Board for disposition.

Millhaven is one of two identically designed maximum security institutions in Canada. The other is located at Archambault Institution, Sainte-Anne-des-Plaines, Quebec.

== Bath Institution ==
Bath Institution
- Interactive map of Bath Institution
- Location: Bath, Ontario; 44.1973°N 76.7523°W
- Status: Operational
- Security class: Maximum security
- Capacity: 340
- Opened: 1972
- Managed by: Corrections Canada
- Warden: Scott Thompson

Also located on the same property is Bath Institution, a medium security facility located along the shores of Lake Ontario. Opened in 1972, it houses 340 inmates.

== Living units ==
Millhaven consists of three main living units, a former segregation unit, a hospital wing, and the Ontario region's Regional Treatment Centre (RTC). There are approximately 120 men per unit. Units have two levels. Ranges are double-sided and have hydraulically locking metal doors (See video in "External Links" section). The ranges/cells are designated by alphanumeric code (i.e. B1, H2 etc.).

Main living units are designated by Alpha codes:

A Unit = A Unit was a Federal Intake and Assessment Unit – Ontario region until 2013 (MAU) (ranges B, C, & D)

E Unit = E Unit was a Federal Intake and Assessment Unit – Ontario region until 2013 (MAU) (and institutional workers) (ranges F, G, & H)

I Unit = Administrative Segregation/Special Needs

J Unit = Maximum Security Unit (MSU) (ranges K, L, & M)

N Area = Main intersection and security control hub.

MAU (Millhaven Assessment Unit) formerly housed inmates recently sentenced to federal time, in the Ontario region. They were assessed and placed in other prisons according to security needs. This responsibility now belongs to Joyceville Assessment Unit. MAU is classified as integrated (housing convicts serving time on all types of charges).

MSU (J unit) houses habitually violent offenders. Many inmates with life sentences are also housed in MSU. It was considered a "gladiator school", and convicts who serve time there were revered in the criminal subculture.

On September 30, 2013, Kingston Penitentiary was closed. Many maximum security inmates housed there were transferred to Millhaven. A new 96 bed facility was constructed within the Millhaven compound, to house inmates from the Kingston Pen closure.

== Security ==
The perimeter is surrounded by a double 9.1-metre (30-foot) razor fence, and has observation towers at the corners.

A 1.2-metre (4-foot) "warning fence" inside the perimeter of the exercise yard acts as a boundary that inmates cannot cross without deadly force being used. Armed patrol vehicles with Colt Canada C8 rifles and parabolic microphones are on guard at all times. There are motion sensors in the outlying property, and multiple CCTV units throughout.

Visitors are subject to personal and vehicle search once on CSC property, and an ION scanner is used upon entry to detect drugs or other compounds on clothing or personal objects. The visiting area is equipped with CCTV, and listening devices are embedded in each table.

Inmates in the MAU (intake - A and E units) are allowed only screened visits, behind glass.

== Notable events ==
Over the years, the institution has seen its share of violence. J unit is considered one of the most dangerous places in Canada's prison system. The most unruly inmates are often housed there.

Millhaven was forced to open early as the prisoners from Kingston Penitentiary were moved there because of the 1971 Kingston Penitentiary riot. The prisoners from Kingston were beaten by the Millhaven guards as they stepped off the buses on 18–19 April 1971 with Billy Knight, the leader of the Kingston penitentiary riot, being singled out by the guards. On 30 April 1971, the Ontario Attorney General Allan Lawrence ordered an investigation by the Ontario Provincial Police into the allegations that the guards of Millhaven had staged mass beatings of the prisoners from Kingston Penitentiary. On 27 May 1971, 11 guards from Millhaven were charged with 24 counts of assault, marking the first time in Canadian history that prison guards had been charged with assaulting inmates. On 10 December 1971, the Millhaven guards were brought to trial with Knight serving as the Crown's star witness. Knight testified that he been attacked with a nightstick as soon as he stepped off the bus, and then was forced to run a gauntlet of guards who beat him as he stumbled along. Knight's injuries which included a vertical laceration on at the back of his skull along with a severely bruised face, a hairline fracture in his skull and a fracture on his left side of his skull supported his testimony. Two Millhaven guards, Bernard Evans and Grant Snider denied beating Knight and claimed that he had simply fallen and hurt himself.

Clayton Powell, the Crown Attorney prosecuting the accused noted that it was unlikely that dozens upon dozens of prisoners had all hurt themselves by falling when entering Millhaven. Powell admitted that the victims of the beatings were criminals, but stated "even the worst criminal in a penitentiary is entitled to protection under the laws of our country". The defense counsel appealed to the emotions of the jury by saying that the accused were officers of the Crown charged with keeping dangerous criminals within Millhaven and that the witnesses for the Crown were "criminal scumbags". The trial ended with a jury acquitting all of the guards on 16 December 1971. Knight had more success in a civil courtroom as he won $3, 500 dollars in a civil suit against the federal government for the beating he had endured. On 24 April 1972, a Royal Commission under Justice J.W. Swackhammer presented its report into the causes of the Kingston Penitentiary riot. The federal government censored the parts of the Swackhammer report which stated that the allegations of the mass beatings at Millhaven on 18–19 April 1971 were true, and which recommended that Warden John D. Clark, Deputy Warden Howard S. Bell and Deputy Warden Patrick McKegeny be fired as Swackhammer accused Clark, Bell and McKegeny of ordering the mass beatings.

On July 10, 1972, fourteen inmates escaped a recreation yard by clipping the chain link fence. A subsequent manhunt was undertaken by police and Canadian Forces personnel. Three hundred police officers and soldiers from CFB Trenton created a cordon that eventually yielded the capture of most of the escapees. In 1974, a prison riot at Millhaven lasted two days and saw 166 cells destroyed by the prisoners. At the time of the 1974 riot, a guard told a journalist from The Toronto Star: "It is a place where you try to survive. That includes the cons, the guards and the brass who run the place".

On the first anniversary of the August 10, 1975, suicide of prisoner Edward Nalon in the infamous "back hole" at Millhaven, prisoners at Millhaven refused to work and began a hunger strike for improvements to the prison system. They asserted that their strike was in solidarity with a strike at the British Columbia Penitentiary, and their strike inspired sympathy hunger strikes at Collins Bay Institution and Joyceville Institution. In response to the 1976 uprising, a report presented to the House of Commons in October 1976 written by 11 MPs stated: "Millhaven's early history was marked by the use of clubs, shackles, gas and dogs often in combination. As former inmates of Kingston Penitentiary said: "Kingston of 1971 hasn't gone away, it's just moved down the road"". The report stated that the conditions of Canadian prisons were "a national disgrace" and stated that Millhaven was one of the worst prisons in Canada.

In 1977 escapees were shot whilst climbing fences at Millhaven institution. Glenn Thomas Landers was killed while fellow inmate Florant Tanguay was injured by buckshot. Prior to the escape attempt a riot had been staged. Inmates had fashioned “zip” guns, and had also smuggled a number of .22 rounds into the prison to aid in their escape, which ultimately failed. On July 5, 1985, the warden of Millhaven (Al Stevenson) was placed under police protection due to credible threats to his life. The threats came from unknown Millhaven inmates. He was transferring into Millhaven from Stony Mountain Institution in Manitoba, where he had a reputation for strictness. Warden Stevenson and his family were placed under guard by the OPP (Ontario Provincial Police). This caution was taken due to the 1978 murder of Archambault Institution (Quebec) warden Michel Roy.

In 2004, correctional officers employed at Millhaven Maximum Security were concerned about their safety after a rash of inmate uprisings. The Court of Queen's Bench of Alberta had ruled that an inmate can conceal a weapon (when in prison) if he/she is defending themselves. This ruling sparked a rash of weapon related attacks in the living units. In May 2009, Millhaven was the site of a riot which lasted less than 24 hours. On October 12, 2010, a correctional officer with a rifle shot a convict who refused orders to stop assaulting another prisoner in an outdoor recreation yard. On December 7, 2010, 120 inmates in the assessment unit refused to return to their cells at the end of a recreation period. They began to barricade themselves in the area and guards fired shotguns and used chemical agents to gain control of the situation.

On March 21, 2011, inmate Jordan Trudeau, 29, was killed in an altercation. The event took place in the gymnasium area during exercise for maximum security inmates. Trudeau and another inmate, David Bagshaw, 21, attacked a third inmate and were fired upon by correctional officers in an attempt to gain control of the situation. Trudeau, whose actions constituted grievous bodily harm and imminent death to the victim, was shot and killed by a correctional officer with a 9mm carbine after being given repeated verbal orders, the deployment of gas and multiple warning shots. Bagshaw was seriously wounded, and was charged with attempted murder in regards to the incident. The Ontario Provincial Police Penitentiary Squad investigated the incident, and determined that CSC staff acted properly.

August 11, 2014, the Canadian Broadcasting Corporation reported that Millhaven Institution was on lockdown to facilitate a major search. Containers that store cereal had gone missing, and officials were concerned enough to lock down the prison. During the lockdown, a serious inmate-on-inmate assault took place.

== Controversy ==
David Martin, a manager at Millhaven, was arrested in August 2010 and convicted of smuggling various narcotics into the prison, apparently in connection with the Hells Angels. He was found dead in his home on August 21, 2011.

In late April 2013, the Canadian Press acquired freedom of information documents indicating that Federal Public Safety Minister, Vic Toews overruled the Millhaven warden, who had approved a radio interview with Omar Khadr.

In February 2014, an investigation was launched by the Office of the Correctional Investigator of Canada, due to complaints regarding the treatment of mentally ill inmates. These inmates had been transferred to Millhaven after the closure of RTC (Regional Treatment Centre) at Kingston Penitentiary. Photos released to the public show questionable facilities and cleanliness in that unit. Some mentally ill inmates had symptoms worsen upon arriving at Millhaven. There was also concern by the John Howard Society of Canada that the underground "bunker-like" location was a very negative atmosphere for these inmates.

== CORCAN ==
Millhaven MSU inmates can gain employment in the CORCAN industries shop. Furniture for federal government offices is fabricated there. Inmates receive a small daily wage for this work, approximately $5 a day. Room and board fees are charged to these workers.

== National security ==
In April 2006, a new division was created to house inmates being held on security certificates. It has been dubbed "Guantanamo". Omar Khadr was transferred to Millhaven from Guantanamo Bay on September 28, 2012, and subsequently transferred to Edmonton Maximum Security Penitentiary on May 28, 2013, due to threats made on his life in Millhaven. Members of a 2006 terrorist plot to attack Canadian targets are incarcerated at Millhaven.

== Popular culture ==
The song "38 Years Old" by The Tragically Hip refers to an escape from the prison. The opening lines of the song are "12 men broke loose in '73, from Millhaven Maximum Security." There was such an escape in 1972. The lyrics of the song were changed to '73 to rhyme with "maximum security", and there were 14 escapees, not 12. The remainder of the song is fiction.

== Notable inmates ==
- Paul Bernardo - serial rapist and murderer
- Merv Blaker- one of the "Port Hope 8"
- Gary Comeau - one of the "Port Hope 8"
- Ty Conn - bank robber and escapee of multiple other institutions
- Peter Demeter - conspired to commit multiple murders
- Juan Ramon Fernandez - gangster
- Bernie Guindon - president of Satan's Choice Motorcycle Club
- Harley Davidson Guindon - outlaw biker
- David Hoffman - one of the "Port Hope 8"
- Omar Khadr - convicted terrorist
- Billy Knight - the leader of the 1971 Kingston Penitentiary riot
- Bruce McArthur - serial killer
- Jeff McLeod - one of the "Port Hope 8"
- Dellen Millard and Mark Smich - serial killers
- Richard Sauvé - one of the "Port Hope 8"
- Hamed Shafia - murderer

== Books ==
- Fogarty, Catherine (2021). Murder on the Inside The True Story of the Deadly Riot at Kingston Penitentiary. Windsor: Biblioasis. ISBN 9781771964029.
