= Lizzie Lessard =

Canadian petty criminal

- Born: Elizabeth Lessard c. 1877; Quebec, Canada
- Died: 1911; Kingston, Ontario, Canada
- Known for: Repeated convictions for vagrancy, theft, and prostitution; 1909 assault on a prison guard
- Status: Deceased
- Conviction: Wounding
- Penalty: Imprisonment

Elizabeth Lessard (c. 1877-1911), also known as Lizzie Lessard, was a Canadian petty criminal.

== Life ==
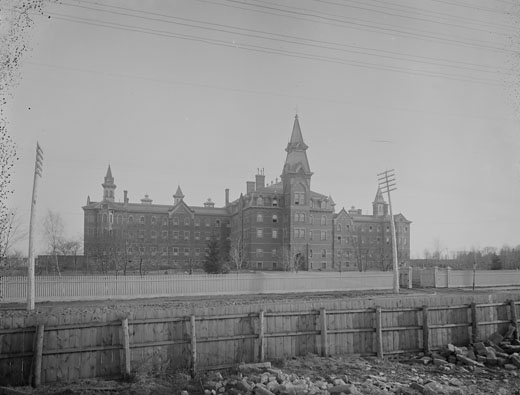
Lessard was first sent to the Andrew Mercer Reformatory for Women in 1893

Elizabeth Lessard was born in Quebec around 1877 and moved to Hamilton, Ontario with her family. Together with her sister Mary she became a petty criminal in her teens; they were both convicted of vagrancy in 1893 and sent to the Andrew Mercer Reformatory for Women. After her release in 1895, she was convicted of offenses such as prostitution, theft and vagrancy seventeen more times and often returned to the reformatory, where she was regularly reported for infractions.

In 1909, Lessard was again incarcerated at the reformatory, when she attacked a guard with a pair of scissors. She aimed to give the guard syphilis from her own infected blood. She was convicted of the crime of wounding on 29 April 1909 and sent to Kingston Penitentiary. She died from the effects of syphilis at Kingston General Hospital in 1911.
