= Gary Comeau =

Canadian outlaw biker

Gary Joseph Comeau (born 6 January 1952) is a Canadian outlaw biker and one of the Port Hope 8 whose conviction for first degree murder in 1979 is widely considered a miscarriage of justice.

== Satan's Choice ==
Comeau was born in Scarborough (modern Toronto) into a working class Roman Catholic family who was raised by his mother Betty King and his stepfather Eugene King in a house on Hexham Avenue. He was educated at the Precious Blood Catholic school where he was a poor student who was often in trouble with the nuns who served as his teachers. A typical report by one of his nun-teachers, Sister Bertha, stated "Gary has a tendency to bully the other children". When he was 12, he broke into the Precious Blood school at night and set fire to a wrestling mat, resulting in his expulsion and transfer to the Holy Annunciation school. In 1967, he dropped out of Porter Collegiate in grade 9 as he had no interest in learning.

In 1968, he started to work as a nut-mixer at the Poppycock candy factory, which led to his nickname of "Nutty". He was fired for throwing nuts at a female co-worker. In 1968, he attended a party hosted by the Satan's Choice at the Blue Bird Inn in Richmond Hill, which he described as a scene out of "Sodom and Gomorrah" which his Catholic education had not prepared him for. Alcohol and marijuana were provided in generous quantities while hundreds of young people were dancing to rock music with most of the young women dancing topless which fascinated Comeau endlessly. A product of sexually repressive Catholic upbringing, he found scene of uninhibited sexuality with hundreds of young women dancing topless to be the complete anthesis of anything he been brought up to believe, which he found liberating. Comeau decided he wanted to join Satan's Choice that night as he decided that the life of an outlaw biker was much better than his existence as a high school drop-out working menial jobs. The police raided the party and Comeau was arrested for marijuana possession, which allowed him to get know several Satan's Choice bikers who were also arrested in the police paddy wagon. Comeau was initially blocked from joining Satan's Choice as the club rules required that an applicant be sponsored by a current member who had known him for at least five years. In March 1970, Comeau joined Satan's Choice at the age of 18 after finally finding a sponsor and he became a "full patch" member in May 1970.

Comeau was described as a hyperactive, talkative man bubbling over with energy who was forever scheming and in trouble. He was first convicted of hashish possession, followed by convictions for drunk driving and "acknowledging bail" as he signed out of the police station after his arrest for impaired driving under a false name. His most serious conviction yet was for indecent assault for the rape of an young woman at the Toronto clubhouse where his lawyer worked out a plea bargain under which he pledged guilty to indecent assault and served six months in prison. Comeau insists that he was innocent and claims that the woman had fabricated the claim of rape after someone had stolen her money at a party. Comeau insists that he did not touch the woman in question, but did not stop the other bikers with having sex with her. Peter Edwards, the crime correspondent of the Toronto Star wrote: "The Crown said the bikers could plead guilty to indecent assault or all be tried for rape. Pleading guilty seemed like the prudent thing to do, but it meant he was still classified as a sex offender". In 1978, he supported himself via welfare fraud and as a pimp. Many other Satan's Choice bikers such as Lorne Campbell considered Comeau to be excessively "loud" and overtly fond of crude jokes.

== The Murder of Bill Matiyek ==
On the evening 18 October 1978, Comeau was drinking and watching a hockey game at the Toronto clubhouse. At about 9:15 pm, he took a phone call from Richard Sauvé of the Peterborough chapter to say that he wanted some other bikers to be with him as he just been invited to a meeting with William "Heavy" Matieyk of the rival Golden Hawk Riders at the Queen's Hotel in Port Hope. When Sauvé called again at 9:30 to say that he could not contact any members of the Peterborough chapter, Comeau decided to drive out to Port Hope to assist Sauvé. Going with Comeau were his best friend Jeff McLeod along with Lorne Campbell, Larry Hurren and Armand Sanguigni. When Comeau arrived at the Queen's Hotel shortly before 11 pm, there was an atmosphere of fear and tension in the bar-room as everyone expected some sort of confrontation. Comeau ordered a drink and sat down with a woman drinking at the bar where he introduced himself as a member of Satan's Choice. Sauvé sat down at the same table with Matiyek and was joined by Comeau. Both bikers discovered much to their discomfort that Matiyek had a gun and was talking about shooting them. Lorne Edgar Campbell came to their aid and shot Matiyek, firing three shots, one of which struck Comeau in the arm.

Bleeding, Comeau fled from the Queen's Hotel with a bullet struck in his arm in the same car as Sauvé and Merv Blaker. They drove first to Toronto, and then to Kitchener to see David Hoffman, the treasurer of the Kitchener chapter whom it was believed would be able to extract the bullet. The wound was treated in Hoffman's kitchen, and he assure them that he had a friend in Windsor who would be able to remove the bullet. The man in Windsor turned out to be a crank whose attempts at extracting the bullet only caused Comeau more pain. Instead, Comeau was smuggled over the border to Detroit to be treated by a doctor as gunshot wounds were common in Detroit. The wound was treated by an American doctor who told Comeau that there was no bullet in his arm. Comeau returned to Canada. During the investigation of Matiyek's murder, the Ontario Provincial Police constable Donald Denis showed witnesses to the murder photographs of Satan's Choice bikers in attempt to identify the killer. On the photographs of Comeau, Denis placed red dots on the corners, which gave the impression to the witnesses that Comeau was guilty. Several of the witnesses named Comeau as the killer.

== Arrest and Trial ==
On 5 December 1978, Comeau was arrested at the Toronto clubhouse on charges of first-degree murder and conspiracy to commit murder. During the raid, the police seized Comeau'a biker jacket with the bullet hole in it and Inspector Colin Cousens expressed much interest in the wound in Comeau's arm. At a bail hearing at Osgoode Hall on 8 December 1978, Comeau was denied bail and was held in the Cobourg County jail. At the preliminary hearing, several witnesses to the shooting testified that it was Comeau who killed Matiyek. Comeau was defended by Howard Kerbel.

The trial for the Port Hope 8 began in London, Ontario on 4 September 1979. The Crown Attorney at the trial, Chris Meinhardt, presented the case as a first-degree murder, calling it "a foul, horrible, planned execution." Meinhardt named Comeau as the man who killed Matiyek. It was known that from X-rays that Comeau had a bullet lodged inside of his arm, but Meinhardt was opposed to removing it under the grounds that there was no evidence that bullet had been fired from the same gun that killed Matiyek. Kerbal had planned to bring in Campbell as a surprise witness who would testify that Comeau had been shot at the same time as Matiyek as a way to force the judge to order the bullet removed. To avoid violating the outlaw biker code, both Comeau and Hurren gave Campbell permission to mention their names during his testimony.

One of the witnesses for the Crown, the waitress Gayle Thompson, identified Comeau as the killer as she stated about the killer "his hair was light, his beard was light". Kerbal asked her: "So there is no doubt in your mind that you were able to identify Mr. Comeau by his hair and by his beard?" Thompson answered "correct". Kerbal followed his question by asking her: "And there is no doubt in your mind, not the slightest doubt, that Mr. Comeau is the man you saw get from Mr. Blaker's table, walk towards Mr. Matiyek's table and shoot Mr. Matiyek?", to which Thompson again answered "correct". However under cross-examination from Kerbel, Thompson stated the killer was wearing a toque. When Kerbel asked if she saw the hair of the killer under the toque, she answered "of course not!" When Kerbal asked her how she knew the killer had blonde hair, she admitted that it was not from her memory of the murder as she had testified to, but from seeing later photographs of Comeau. Thompson also conceded under cross-examination that she had been less certain when viewing the photo array in October-November 1978 as she stated at the time that Comeau could "possibly" be the killer. Kerbel also forced Thompson to admit that she had picked another Satan's Choice biker, Ray Snider, out of the photo array and named him as the killer, only to be told that Snider was in prison at the time of the murder.

Another witness for the Crown, a day laborer, David Gillespie, testified that he was at the Queen's Hotel on the night of the murder. Gillespie testified that he heard Comeau ask Richard Sauvé and Merv Blaker just before the murder: "Are we going to do it to this fat fucker now or what?" Gillespie's testimony was the only evidence that the Crown introduced in support of the thesis that Matiyek's killing was first degree murder as Meinhardt used Gillespie's testimony to argue that the Satan's Choice bikers had gone to the Queen's Hotel with the intention of killing Matyiek. Gillespie also testified that he was not certain if Comeau was present when Matiyek was killed. Kerbal asked Gillespie: "Look at him! Look at Mr. Comeau! Now is he the man you saw at Mr. Matiyek's table before he was shot?" Gillespie replied: "He looks like the man".

Campbell testified that during the trial that Comeau was innocent and that he had killed Matiyek. Under cross-examination from Kerbel, Campbell testified that Comeau had been shot, saying there was a bullet hole in Comeau's jacket and he was bleeding in his arm. In response, Justice Counter Osborne ordered Comeau to be taken to the hospital to remove the bullet, a request opposed by Meinhardt. On 31 October 1979, Comeau was taken to the Victoria hospital where the bullet in his arm was extracted and a ballistic test showed that bullet was fired from the same .38 gun that killed Comeau. Furthermore, pieces of threading from the coat that Matiyek was wearing at the time he was killed were found wrapped around the bullet in Comeau's arm. For Comeau to be the killer as the Crown had claimed would required the bullet to do the impossible, namely enter Matiyek's neck, exit his body, turn around in mid-air, and come to strike Comeau in the arm. Meinhardt was forced to change his thesis mid-way through the trial to now change there were two gunmen instead of one to explain away the "boomerang bullet". Edwards wrote: "How-and why-two killers would shoot from the same gun within seconds was never explained". Comeau's mother testified that her son had always been right-handed while the witnesses all stated that the killer was left-handed. Comeau's biker's jacket with the bullet hole mysteriously vanished after the police seized it.

In his final submission to the jury, Meinhardt still claimed that Comeau was the gunman as he dismissed Campbell's confession given on the stand that he had killed Matiyek. Meinhardt told the jury: "It is my respectful submission that you should treat him [Campbell] with all the contempt that he deserves...There isn't an iota of evidence except from the lips of a convicted perjurer that the gunman was a dark-haired man with a goatee and an earring in his left ear...All of the evidence points to a blond-haired, blonde-bearded gunman".

On 24 November 1979, Comeau was found guilty of first degree murder and sentenced to life imprisonment. Peter Edwards, the crime correspondent of The Toronto Star stated about the Crown's theory of two gunmen: "Rubbish. How does Gary Comeau end up getting a bullet in him with Bill’s clothing on it? I can’t begin to believe that. There wasn’t any second guy at all. The police work was horrible. You have to remember this was the pre-DNA era, and we didn’t have that security blanket of forensic testing. The Gary Comeau conviction (for Matiyek’s murder) in today’s terms is just beyond laughable. That’s like a bad Perry Mason story."

== Imprisonment ==
Comeau was first held at Kingston Penitentiary where he was noted for "adamantly" insisting he was innocent. Comeau came to be obsessed with establishing his innocence and read the entire trial transcript, which amounted to 17 volumes that weighted 35 pounds, in an attempt to find flaws in the Crown's case. In 1980, Comeau was transferred to the Millhaven Institution maximum security prison. Comeau described Millhaven as "the dead zone", a prison where stabbings were common and one either kept busy or went insane. He was held in the J-Unit, the general population unit. Comeau played for the Satan's Choice prison hockey team, the Millhaven Bulldogs, which became his main form of relaxing. When Comeau's appeal of the guilty verdict was rejected by the Ontario Court of Appeal, he became deeply depressed at the thought of spending the rest of his life in Millhaven. Many of the prisoners at Millhaven were addicted to sniffing glue and Comeau found such inmates to be aggressively annoying as the smell of the glue had damaged their brains, causing them to talk nonsense at length.

One of Comeau's associates in Satan's Choice, William "Mr. Bill" Lavoie of the Oshawa chapter considered breaking him out of prison as Lavoie was convinced of Comeau's innocence. Lavoie devised a scheme to use an old Sherman tank named Conqueror from World War Two that was parked outside of the Oshawa armory to break into Millhaven to free Comeau and the rest of the Port Hope 8. Lavoie told Campbell during a walk by the Canadian Army's Oshawa armory: "We can get that [the tank] going. We could get it transported down to there. We'll go through the fence. We'll have a boat waiting. They won't know what hit them". Campbell pointed out that the tank was inoperable and the scheme was impractical. In 1983, Campbell who had convicted of another set of charges, arrived at Millhaven. Comeau assured Campbell that no prisoners were willing to kill him after Campbell saw another prisoner beat Michel Lafleaur to death. Lafleaur had been a FLQ member who had raised money to buy guns by robbing banks and who had his head smashed in with a baseball bat by another prisoner for reasons that remain unclear. During a hockey game, Comeau who was unused to violence, was repeatedly attacked by Gary Barnes, a player for another team. Campbell who was more accustomed to violence than Comeau took his place in the Millhaven Bulldogs, and used his skates in an unsuccessful attempt to slash Barnes's throat. Campbell described Comeau as a "nice guy" who was not up for the challenge of the bloody hockey fights that were the norm within the prison system, and usually took his place in the Millhaven Bulldogs when the hockey violence threatened to get out of control.

On 13 April 1984, Comeau was transferred to Collins Bay Institution medium security prison for good conduct. Comeau along with Blaker's lawyer Terry O'Hara continued to pursue his case and on 20 November 1984 received a letter from one of the witnesses for the Crown at his trial, Roger Davey, who stated that his testimony was perjury made under police pressure. In 1985, he wrote to the social activist Claire Culhane who took up his case in the courtroom and in the media. Comeau became something of an amateur lawyer during his imprisonment. In February 1987 following a brawl in the prison yard between Satan's Choice and Outlaws bikers, Comeau who was not involved in the brawl was temporarily sent back to Millhaven during which he was held in solitary confinement. Prison officials admitted that it was not necessary to hold Comeau in solitary confinement at Millhaven as he was a friendly, non-violent inmate, but had no choice as the rules required all imprisoned members of a biker gang be held in solitary confinement in the event of violence involving one of their number.

The Port Hope 8 case became a cause célèbre in the 1980s-1990s with many using the implausibility of the "boomerang bullet" to argue for Comeau's innocence. In February 1994, a rally hosted by the Association in Defense of the Wrongly Convicted was held in Toronto where the boxer Rubin "Hurricane" Carter called in a speech for the Crown to release Comeau and Sauvé. In March 1994, a judicial review was held to determine if Comeau was worthy of parole. A prison psychologist told the review that Comeau was harmless as he was in his view "a very, very low risk to society". By contrast, the Crown which still insisted that Comeau was the man who killed Matieyk called him one of the most dangerous criminals in Canada. Comeau's request for parole was refused as the Crown's thesis won out. However, Comeau was transferred to the minimal security Warkworth Institution and allowed day passes out of prison as Comeau had been a model inmate who had never engaged in violence.

Comeau was the last of the "Port Hope 8" to be freed, being released on 8 September 2000. Comeau was released on full parole over the protests of the Crown. Comeau still maintained his innocence, but followed the outlaw biker code by refusing to name Campbell as the killer. One of his parole conditions was that he had to resign from Satan's Choice. Comeau worked as a mail courier and is active in the Association In Defense of the Wrongly Convicted (AIDWYC). In December 2008, he suffered a heart attack, which required him to wear a pacemaker. Comeau is at present seeking a review of his case for a full exoneration and for an apology from the Ontario government, which still maintains that Comeau killed Matiyek.

== Books ==
- Auger, Michel; Edwards, Peter (2012). The Encyclopedia of Canadian Organized Crime: From Captain Kidd to Mom Boucher. Toronto: McClelland & Stewart. ISBN 978-0771030499.
- Edwards, Peter (2013). Unrepentant The Strange and (Sometimes) Terrible Life of Lorne Campbell, Satan's Choice and Hells Angels Biker. Toronto: Vintage Canada. ISBN 9780307362575.
- Edwards, Peter (2017). Hard Road: Bernie Guindon and the Reign of the Satan's Choice Motorcycle Club. Toronto: Random House. ISBN 978-0345816108.
- Langton, Jerry (2010). Showdown: How the Outlaws, Hells Angels and Cops Fought for Control of the Streets. Toronto: John Wiley & Sons. ISBN 978-0470678787.
- Lowe, Mick (2013). A Conspiracy of Brothers: A True Story of Bikers, Murder and the Law. Toronto: Vintage Canada. ISBN 978-0345813169.
