= Rick Salutin =

Canadian novelist, playwright, journalist, and critic

- Born: August 30, 1942 (age 83); Toronto, Ontario, Canada
- Occupations: Novelist, Playwright, Journalist, Critic
- Partner: Theresa Burke
- Children: 1

Rick Salutin (born August 30, 1942) is a Canadian novelist, playwright, journalist, and critic and has been writing for more than forty years. Until October 1, 2010, he wrote a regular column in The Globe and Mail; on February 11, 2011, he began a weekly column in the Toronto Star.

He is a contributing editor of This Magazine. He received his Bachelor of Arts degree in Near Eastern and Jewish Studies at Brandeis University and got his Master of Arts degree in religion at Columbia University. He also studied philosophy at the New School for Social Research in New York City. He was once a trade union organizer in Toronto and participated in the Artistic Woodwork strike.

Salutin is interested in communication and has praised Harold Innis, an economist who taught at the University of Toronto and conceived of the staples thesis, for his outlook in communications. Salutin has a child with The Fifth Estate journalist Theresa Burke, whom he has cited as the model for the characters Amy Bert and Antia in The Womanizer.

== Journalism ==
Salutin has written in many magazines, including Harpers, Maclean's, Canadian Business, Toronto Life, Weekend, Saturday Night, Quest, TV Times, Today, and This Magazine. He wrote "The Culture Vulture" column for many years in This Magazine and received National Newspaper awards for it. He won the National Newspaper Award for best columnist for a column he wrote in The Globe and Mail.

He introduced cartoon strips to This Magazine and convinced Margaret Atwood to regularly collaborate. She made a cartoon strip called "Kanadian Kultchur Komics".

In Waiting for Democracy: A Citizen's Journal (1989), he expresses his thoughts on the federal election in 1989 and writes about interviewing people before the election.

== Drama ==
Salutin has an interest in drama and performing arts. His first play, Fanshen, unpublished, was adapted from William Hinton's book Fanshen and was produced by Toronto Workshop Productions. The Adventures of an Immigrant shows that he is concerned about poverty and other hardships in Western society. His unpublished Maria was a drama on CBC Television about a woman fighting to put factory workers in the union.

His first published play was 1837: The Farmers' Revolt about the revolt led by William Lyon Mackenzie. This play was created at Theatre Passe Muraille and produced on CBC Television in 1975. 1837 won the Chalmers award for best Canadian play in 1977.

His most successful play, Les Canadiens (1977), written with help from goaltender Ken Dryden, won him the Chalmers Outstanding Play award.

Salutin helped found the Guild of Canadian Playwrights and in 1978 became chairman. Another play he wrote is Joey (1981).

== Novels ==
His first novel, A Man of Little Faith, is about a religious man discovering himself in a Jewish community. It received the W.H. Smith Books in Canada First Novel Award. His books Marginal Notes: Challenges to the Mainstream and Living in a Dark Age are based on many of his articles from This Magazine. He won the Toronto Arts award for writing and publishing.

== Book review ==
Taken from a book review of The Womanizer: "It's both lively and witty, but not as light as it might seem on first glance."

== Published writing ==
=== Books ===
- —— (1975). Good Buy Canada!.
- —— (1980). Kent Rowley: A Canadian Union Life.
- —— (1984). Marginal Notes: Challenges to the Mainstream.
- —— (1988). A Man of Little Faith.
- —— (1989). Waiting for Democracy.
- —— (1991). Living in a Dark Age.
- —— (1995). The Age of Improv.
- —— (2002). The Womanizer.

=== Plays ===
- 1837: The Farmers' Revolt - 1976, with Paul Thompson
- Les Canadiens - 1977

== Literature ==
- Bauch, Marc A. (2012), Canadian self-perception and self-representation in English-Canadian drama after 1967, Cologne (Köln), Germany: Wiku Verlag, ISBN 9783865534071

== See also ==
- List of Canadian playwrights
