= Norman Ryan =

Armed robber

Norman "Red" Ryan, (8 July 1895 – 23 May 1936) was a notorious gangster in early 20th century Toronto, Ontario. He came from an Irish Catholic upbringing and he took to the streets as a young man to engage in crime. He was called the 'Jesse James of Canada' and he was known for armed robbery, safecracking, and other major theft. He killed six people in his career. He was arrested in Minnesota on 14 December 1923 and given life imprisonment, which he served in Canada. He served his sentence at Kingston Penitentiary. He was killed in a liquor store in Sarnia by a police officer after being shot 3 times.

In prison he lived the life of a model prisoner and became a poster child for the prison reform movement in Canada. A large-scale movement to change the parole system with such supporters as Prime Minister R.B. Bennett, several major newspapers and major politicians, led to Ryan's release from prison in 1935.

After his release he hosted a popular radio program on CFRB where he denounced the criminal lifestyle and his own past life. He was photographed at the Toronto police games in 1935 standing next to John "Duke" McGarry (a Toronto hotelkeeper and the official starter of the games), Dr MM Crawford (the chief coroner of Toronto), Frank Denton (York County Judge), EJ "Eddy" Murphy (a well-respected lawyer who had known Ryan from his childhood), and Percy J. Quinn (Toronto city alderman).

At the same time that he was leading this life, he got together with gang members Edward McMullen and Harry Checkley, and went on a ten-month-long armed robbery spree across the province of Ontario. He lived a Dr Jekyll/Mr Hyde existence and he successfully kept his robberies secret from the public eye.

In the early morning of 29 February 1936, he and his gang broke into a car garage in Markham village with the intention of stealing a 1935 V8 Chevrolet Master Sedan. As they were pulling away the car, the owner of the garage and his son came out to confront them. After a bitter melee fight in the stolen car, both father and son were shot by the gang members. The stolen car was abandoned on the side of Ontario Highway 7 and the gang members took to their own car to flee the scene. The local constable pursued after them but gave up the chase after the gang members fired over fifty rounds into his car. The father, who had been shot in the head with a sawed-off shotgun, succumbed to his injuries and died a week later. As a result, a large reward was placed on information leading to the arrest of the gunmen.

Ryan denounced the shooting on his radio programme and he went to police headquarters in Toronto, where he presented himself to the chief detective as an undercover man to help solve the case.

Harry Checkley and Ryan were killed by police bullets at a liquor store in Sarnia a few months later on 23 May 1936. Constable Jack Lewis died in the altercation. The last broadcast of Ryan's programme on CFRB came directly before the news broadcast about his death in Sarnia. Edward McMullen tried to flee into the United States but he was gunned down at the Blaine crossing in British Columbia/Washington after he opened fire on the border guards when they decided to search him. The Archdiocese of Toronto refused to give Ryan a Catholic burial.

== Bibliography ==
- McSherry, Peter. The Big Red Fox: The Incredible Story of Norman "Red" Ryan, Canada's Most Notorious Criminal. Dundurn Press, Toronto (1999). ISBN 9781554880966
- Robin, Martin. The Saga of Red Ryan and Other Tales of Violence from Canada’s Past. Western Producer Prairie Books, Saskatoon (1982). ISBN 9780888330987
