= Ty Conn =

Canadian bank robber (1967–1999)

- Born: Ernest Bruce Hayes; January 18, 1967; Ontario, Canada
- Died: May 20, 1999 (aged 32); Toronto, Canada
- Cause of death: Self-inflicted gunshot wound
- Other name: Tyrone Williams Conn
- Occupation: Bank robber
- Known for: Escaping from Kingston Penitentiary

Tyrone Williams "Ty" Conn (January 18, 1967 – May 20, 1999), born Ernest Bruce Hayes, was a Canadian bank robber. He was the only person in the last half-century to escape over the wall from Kingston Penitentiary, one of Canada's most secure prisons.

== History ==
Tyrone Conn was born in 1967, as Ernest Bruce Hayes, to a 15-year-old mother from Ontario and a father from Newfoundland and Labrador. Soon after his birth, his mother abandoned him to the care of his father, who in turn abandoned him to the care of his maternal grandparents. They placed him for adoption at the age of three.

He was adopted by a Belleville, Ontario psychiatrist, Dr. E. Bert Conn, and his wife. Dr. Conn's wife was described as mentally unstable. Tyrone Conn remained with Dr. Conn and his wife for eight years before being returned to the care of the local Children's Aid Society.

He then spent the balance of his adolescent and teenage years in foster homes, group homes, and youth detention facilities, starting at the Brookside Training School, at the age of fourteen.

During his time with his adoptive parents, Conn had developed a habit of compulsive stealing, starting with food and escalating, by his teens, to cars. From the age of thirteen to his death, nineteen years later, Conn was only "legally at large" for a total of sixty-nine days. Conn had also been "illegally at large" by escaping from a number of lower-security institutions.

In 1998, Conn was transferred to Kingston Penitentiary for acting as an informant at the Millhaven Institution. He advised security staff at Millhaven that fellow inmates were planning an escape and was therefore placed in protective custody.

Conn's escape on May 6, 1999, from inside the compound was the 26th in the history of facility. More than 50 escapees were involved in those 26 incidents. Conn employed a ladder and homemade grappling hook to scale the wall and used cayenne pepper to prevent dogs from following his scent.

== Death and aftermath ==
Conn was found in a Toronto apartment building two weeks after his escape. Surrounded by police, he committed suicide, rather than be captured. Other theories assert that Conn accidentally discharged the stolen shotgun in his possession during the standoff, while he was speaking on the telephone to Theresa Burke, a CBC producer. Burke and journalist Linden MacIntyre, both associated with the television program The Fifth Estate, later published Who Killed Ty Conn (Viking Press Canada, 2000; reissued 2011, Creative Book Publishing, St. John's). MacIntyre had met and befriended Conn in 1994, during the course of researching an investigative story on the effects of child abuse. At the time, Conn was serving a 47-year sentence, principally for bank robbery. The length of the compound sentence was despite the lack of violence in his criminal record. MacIntyre arranged for Conn's funeral and also gave a eulogy at the service.

He often told me how badly he felt about the people he frightened.

Journalist Linden MacIntyre at Ty Conn's funeral, 1999.
