= Kingston Penitentiary =

Former Canadian maximum security prison

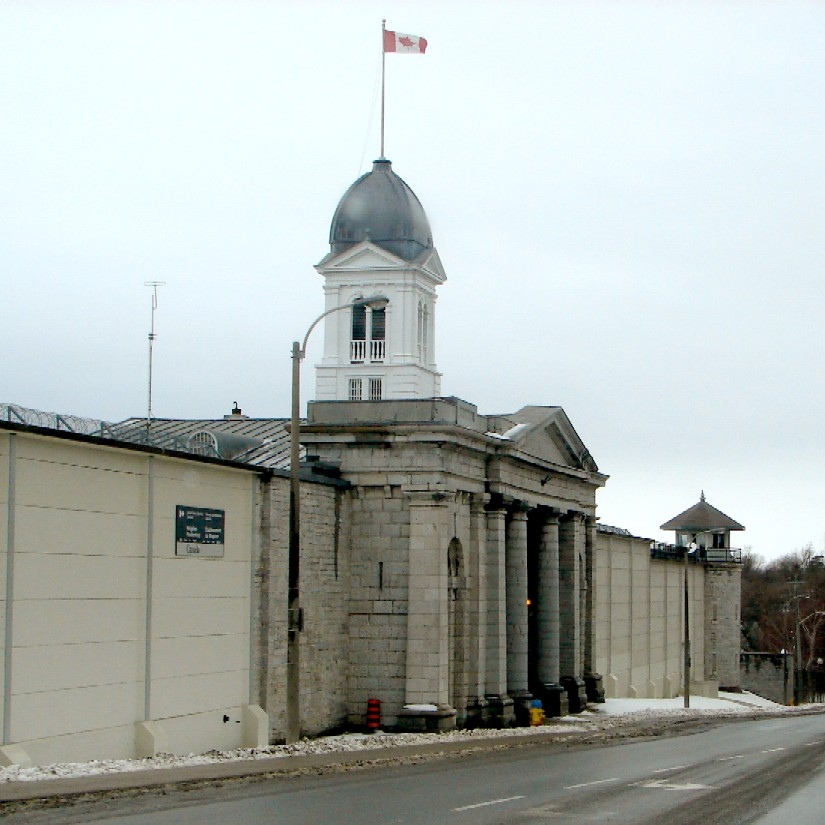
- Kingston Penitentiary front entrance
- Interactive map of Kingston Penitentiary
- Location: Kingston, Ontario; 44°13′10″N 76°30′49″W
- Security class: Maximum security
- Capacity: 564
- Opened: June 1, 1835
- Closed: September 30, 2013
- Managed by: Correctional Service Canada

National Historic Site of Canada
- Designated: 1990

Kingston Penitentiary (known locally as KP and Kingston Pen) is a former maximum security prison located in Kingston, Ontario, Canada, between King Street West and Lake Ontario.

== History ==
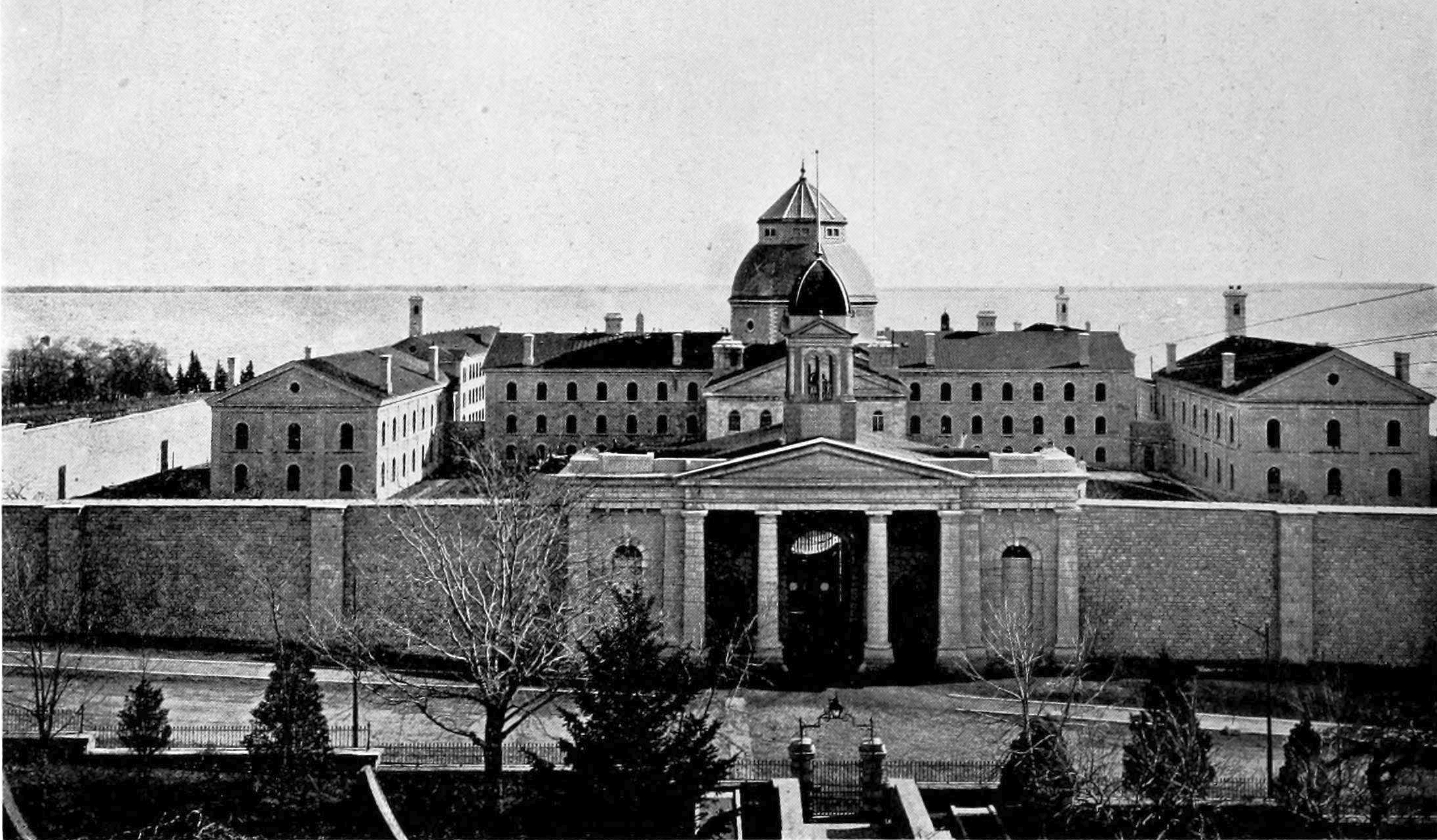
Kingston Penitentiary, c. 1901

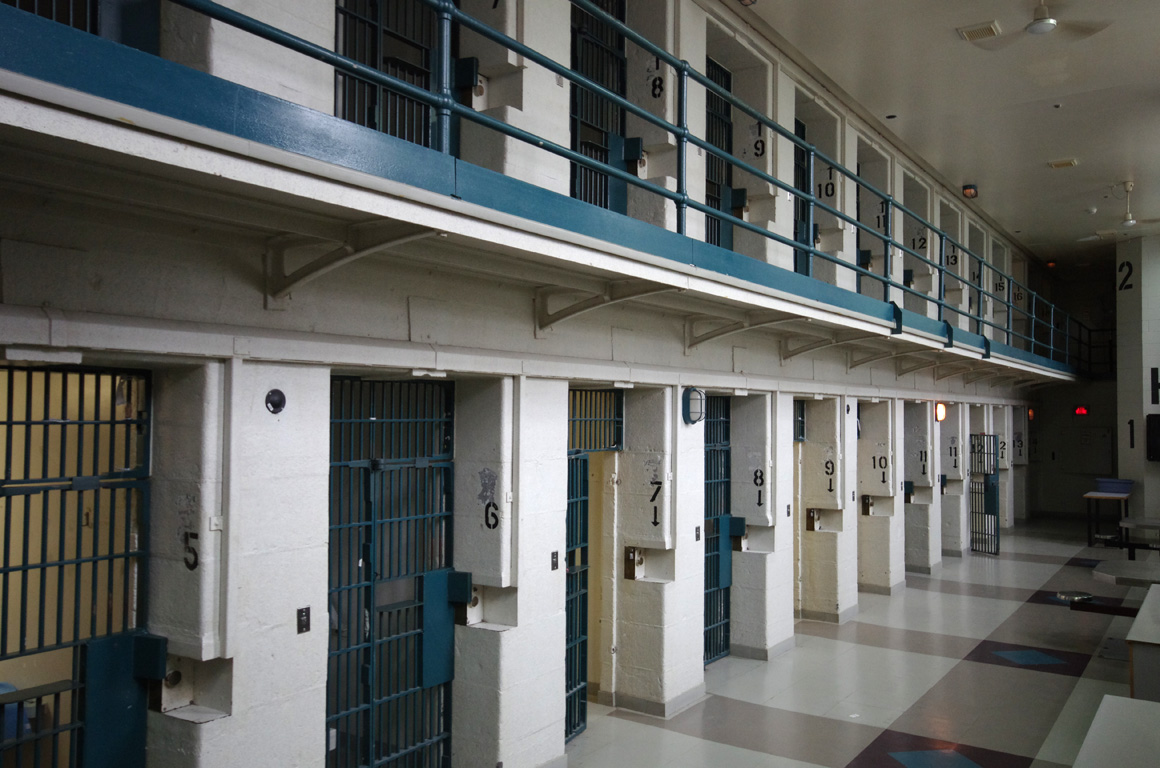
Kingston Penitentiary cellblock

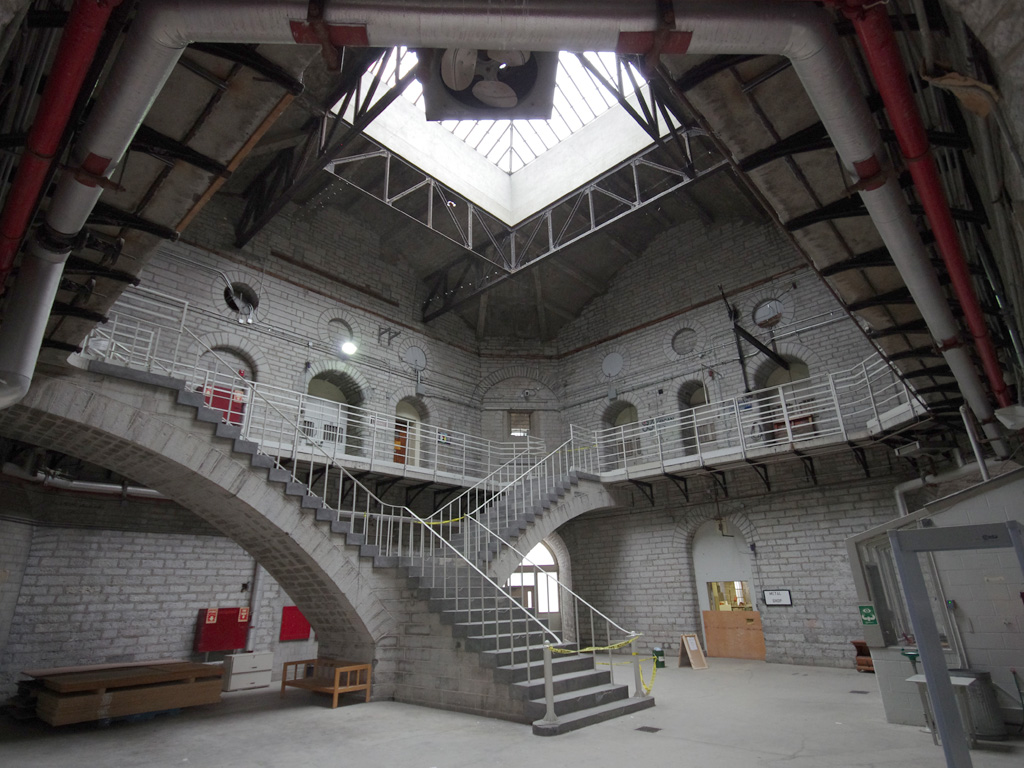
Unique architecture under dome connecting the shop buildings

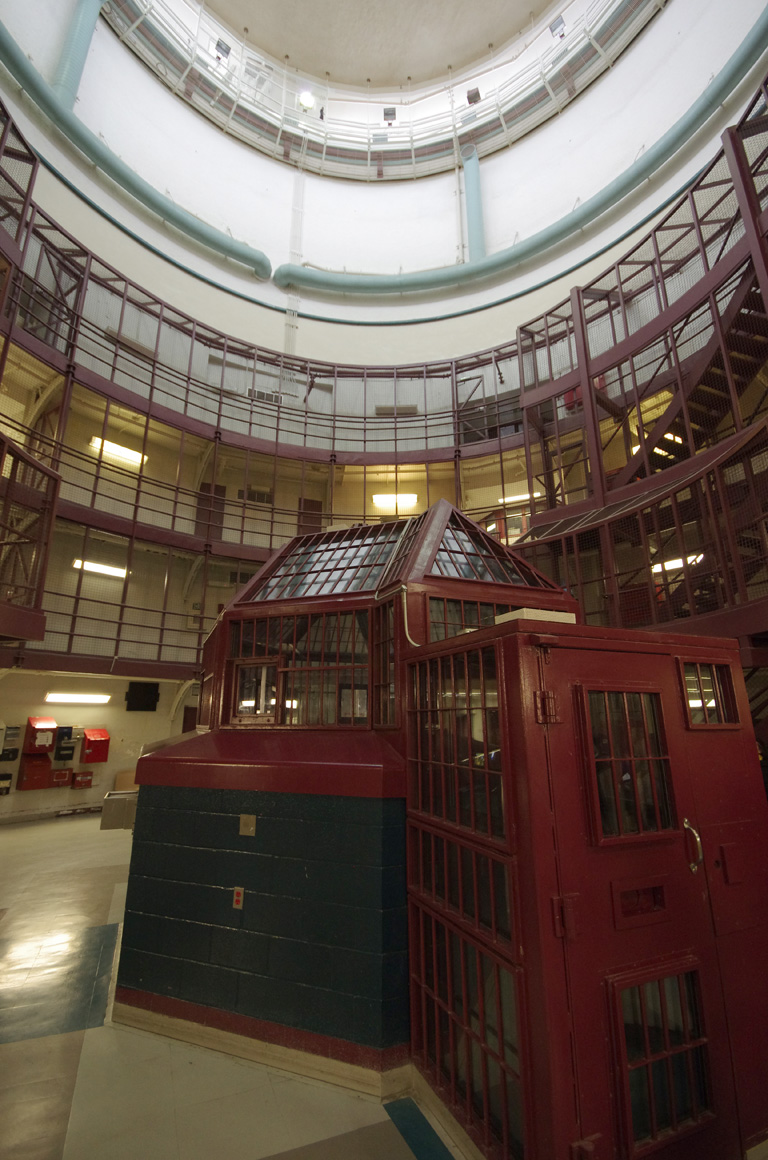
Guard house under main dome connecting the four cellblock buildings

Constructed from 1833 to 1834 and opened on June 1, 1835, as the "Provincial Penitentiary of the Province of Upper Canada," it was one of the oldest prisons in continuous use in the world at the time of its closure in 2013. Kingston Penitentiary was one of nine prisons in the Kingston area, prisons which ranged from low-security facilities to the maximum-security facilities of Kingston Penitentiary and of Millhaven Institution, which was initially built to replace Kingston Pen.

The institution was built on land described as "lot number twenty, in the first concession of the Township of Kingston." The cells originally measured 73.7 cm (29.0 in) wide by 244 cm (8.01 ft) deep and 200.7 centimetres (6 feet 7.0 inches) high. The area had a 12-foot high wooden picket fence. In 1845 towers, stock walls, and the north gate house were completed. From 1859 through 1861 a dome was added connecting four cellblocks.

The site was chosen for "combining the advantages of perfect salubrity, ready access to the water, and abundant quantities of fine limestone." Six inmates were accepted when the penitentiary was opened. English author Charles Dickens visited Kingston in 1842 and commented in his American Notes: "There is an admirable jail here, well and wisely governed, and excellently regulated, in every respect. The men were employed as shoemakers, ropemakers, blacksmiths, tailors, carpenters, and stonecutters; and in building a new prison, which was pretty far advanced towards completion. The female prisoners were occupied in needlework."

The penitentiary’s western wall adjoins the Portsmouth Olympic Harbour, which hosted the sailing events for the 1976 Summer Olympics. Immediately across the road to the north is the now-closed Kingston Prison for Women, which functioned from January 24, 1934, to May 8, 2000, taking female prisoners who had been housed in segregated quarters in the main facility.

=== Riots ===
==== 1954 ====
On August 14, 1954, a two-hour riot broke out in the penitentiary—the worst in its history up to that point—involving 900 inmates. During the riot a breakout was attempted, but was foiled by the guards at the gate. The trouble apparently began during a morning baseball game in the exercise yard, when a guard was attacked, followed by several inmates setting fire to various buildings in the yard, including the shops and a warehouse, causing an estimated $2 million in damages. The disturbance was quelled by the guards aided by 160 Canadian Army troops and a squad of Royal Canadian Mounted Police (RCMP) officers. The 50 ringleaders were placed in solitary confinement.

==== 1971 ====
On April 14, 1971, a riot led by the prison barber, Billy Knight, lasted four days and resulted in the death of two inmates and destruction of much of the prison. Security was substantially increased and prison reforms were instituted. Six correctional officers were held hostage, but all were eventually released unharmed. The prisoners issued formal grievances to the media including lack of recreational time, lack of work, and concerns about their future conditions in the newly built Millhaven Prison. During the riot, two prisoners, the child molester, Brian Ensor, and Bertrand Robert, a man who killed his five children, were murdered by the other prisoners. To put a stop to what was threatening to become a massacre, another inmate, Barrie MacKenzie, made a decision to release the hostages early on the morning of 18 April 1971. On 22 November 1971, the Crown made a plea bargain with the charges of two counts of first-degree murder against Brian Beaucage, who had organized the murders, were dropped in exchange for Beaucage making a guilty plea to one count of assault causing bodily harm with regard to the beating he had inflicted on Ensor. The plea bargain was and still is very controversial.

A 1971 inquiry into the riot, chaired by Justice J.W. Swackhamer, reported that they had "already noted a number of causes for Kingston’s failure: the aged physical facilities, overcrowding, the shortage of professional staff, a program that had been substantially curtailed, the confinement in the institution of a number of people who did not require maximum security confinement, too much time spent in cells, a lack of adequate channels to deal with complaints and the lack of an adequate staff which resulted in the breakdowns of established procedures to deal with inmate requests. The polarization between inmates and custodial staff, between custodial staff and professional staff, led inevitably to the destruction of the program and deterioration in the life of the institution." This riot, together with successors in 1975, led to officials opening the "Sub-Committee on the Penitentiary System in Canada," chaired by Justice Mark MacGuigan. The 1977 MacGuigan Report recommended the creation of an Independent Chairperson (ICP) to investigate prisoner complaints.

=== 1971–1981 ===
From 1971 to 1981, the penitentiary served as Corrections Canada’s Ontario Region Reception Centre. Before it closed, the facility housed between 350 and 500 inmates, plus another 120 at the Regional Treatment Centre contained within the prison. Every inmate was given an individual cell.

In its later years, Kingston Penitentiary became known as a "dumping ground for bad guards," and after an investigation by the RCMP, eight guards were terminated.

In 1990, Kingston Penitentiary was designated a National Historic Site of Canada.

On April 19, 2012, the Government of Canada announced plans to close the Kingston Penitentiary, along with the Leclerc Institution in Laval, Quebec and the Regional Treatment Centre in Kingston, Ontario. Kingston Penitentiary officially closed on September 30, 2013. The penitentiary was opened during October/November 2013 for public tours hosted by the United Way of KFL&A and Habitat for Humanity Canada.

== Escapes ==
On September 10, 1923, inmate Norman "Red" Ryan planned and carried out an escape with several other inmates. After setting fire to a shed as a distraction, the gang used a ladder and went over the wall. They stole a car from a nearby property and fled the city.

On August 17, 1947, inmates Nicholas Minelli, Ulysses Lauzon, and Donald "Mickey" Macdonald climbed over the wall behind the east cell block, after cutting through the bars on their cell. Both Minelli and Lauzon were recaptured, but Macdonald was never found.

In 1999, inmate Ty Conn escaped from the facility. Although there had been at least 26 escape attempts since 1836, Conn was the first to evade capture for weeks since 1958. Two weeks later, surrounded by police in Toronto, Conn suffered a fatal self-inflicted gunshot wound while speaking on the telephone to CBC producer Theresa Burke.

== Notable inmates ==
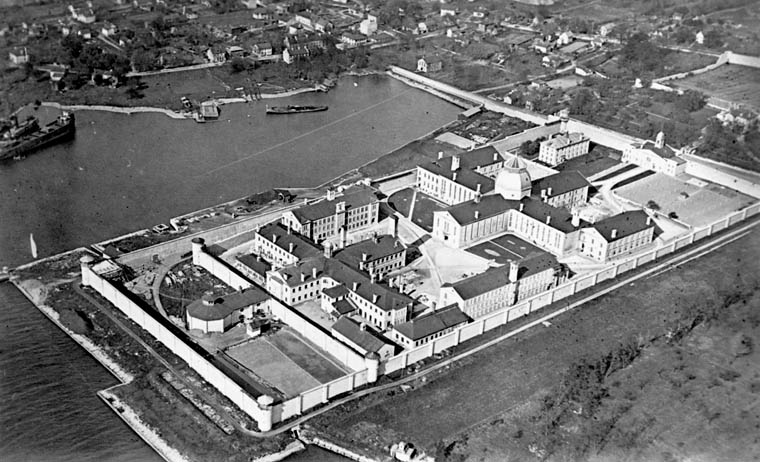
Aerial photo from 1919

Kingston Penitentiary had been home to many of Canada's most dangerous and notorious criminals. James Donnelly, patriarch of the Donnelly family, was sentenced to be hanged on September 17, 1859, for the murder of Patrick Farrell. A petition for clemency started by his wife Johannah saw his sentence reduced to seven years in Kingston Penitentiary.

Other notable inmates include Lizzie Lessard, Wayne Ford, Russell Williams, Paul Bernardo, Clifford Olson, Roger Caron and Grace Marks. Wayne Boden, the Canadian "Vampire Rapist" died there in March 2006. Tim Buck, leader of the Communist Party, was a prisoner at Kingston Penitentiary convicted under Section 98 of the Criminal Code during the early 1930s. Bernie Guindon, the president of the Satan's Choice Motorcycle Club who served part of his rape sentence at Kingston penitentiary in 1969-1970 described Kingston penitentiary as a very harsh prison where the other prisoners were not permitted to speak to one another outside of their cells unless a guard was present. Guindon's son, Harley Davidson Guindon, was held at Kingston in 2011. Several of the Port Hope 8 such as Gary Comeau, Merv Blaker, Jeff McLeod, and Richard Sauvé were held at Kingston Penitentiary in 1979–1980. The gangster Gregory Woolley served his sentence at Kingston Penitentiary between 2005 and 2007. Howard Chard, the chief enforcer of the Papalia family, was the boxing champion of Kingston Penitentiary in the 1940s. Gregory Woolley, the boss of the Hells Angels puppet gang, the Rockers, served his prison sentence at Kingston Penitentiary between 2005 and 2011.

Marie-Anne Houde, formerly convicted for the murder of her stepdaughter Aurore Gagnon, was sentenced to life in Kingston Penitentiary, following the appeal to commute her sentence to death citing health reasons. She was released on June 29, 1935.

Robert Gentles was killed by six guards in 1993. Two men, Ravin Gill and Bradley Waugh, placed wanted posters for the six guards around the city which led to their being charged with criminal libel. The ensuing criminal case resulted in the law being struck down in Ontario. A coroner's inquest concluded Gentles's death was accidental.

Mohammad and Hamed Shafia were imprisoned in the penitentiary after being convicted of killing Mohammad's three daughters and first wife. Michael Rafferty was serving a life sentence for his role in the kidnapping, rape and murder of eight-year-old Victoria Stafford of Woodstock, but has since been relocated.

== In popular media ==
In the 1987 Canadian novel In the Skin of a Lion, a chapter begins at Kingston Penitentiary. Much of the 1996 novel Alias Grace is set in Kingston Penitentiary where the real life Grace Marks was imprisoned, and in the 2013 novel Cataract City one of the main characters is imprisoned at Kingston Penitentiary for 20 years following a murder.

The 2021 television series Mayor of Kingstown was filmed at the penitentiary, as was the 2026 crime drama I Will Find You.

The 1985 Lawrence Gowan song "A Criminal Mind" was inspired by a cell block at Kingston Penitentiary. Neil Young's song "Time Off for Good Behaviour," which was recorded in the 1980s and not officially released until 2024, mentions Kingston Penitentiary. The song features the lines, "My brother went to prison. He's in Kingston doin' time. He got seven years for sellin' what I've been smokin' all my life."

== Correctional Service of Canada Museum ==
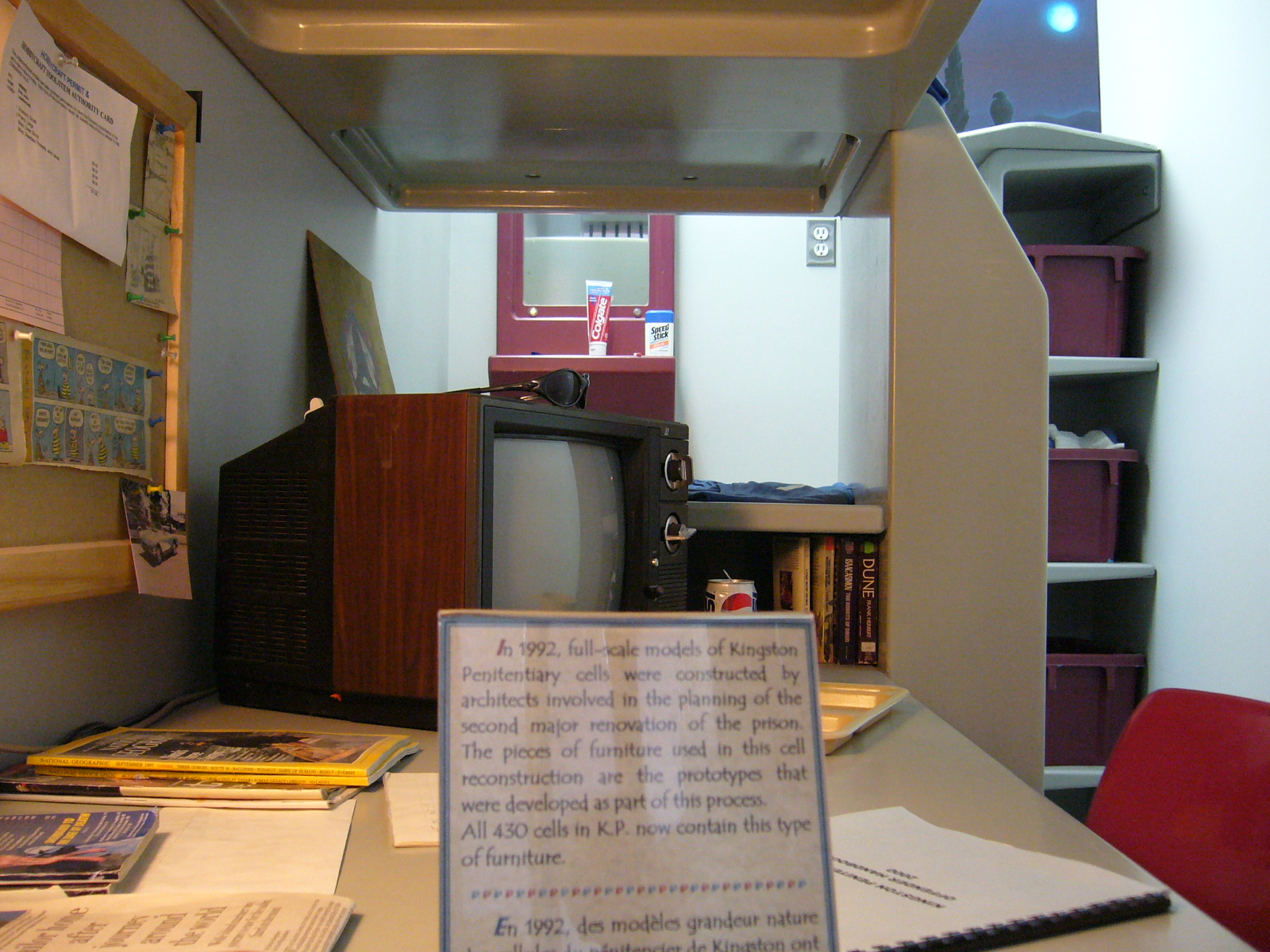
A full-scale model of a KP cell found in the Correctional Service of Canada Museum

Located directly across from Kingston Penitentiary, the Correctional Service of Canada Museum (also known as "Canada's Penitentiary Museum") explains the history of Kingston Penitentiary and other correctional centres using displays that incorporate artifacts, photographs, equipment, and replicas. The museum also houses most of the institution's historical records as well as those of other Canadian penitentiaries, and provides the only penitentiary research service in Canada. The museum is located in "Cedarhedge", the former Warden's residence of Kingston Penitentiary that was constructed between 1870 and 1873.

== See also ==
- List of Canadian correctional workers who have died in the line of duty
