= Crime in Toronto =

Crime in Toronto has been low in comparison to other major cities. In 2024, a ranking of 60 large cities by The Economist ranked Toronto as the 6th safest major city in the world, and the safest major city in North America.

Even though Toronto is the fourth largest city in North America, it has a relatively low homicide rate that has fluctuated over the 2010s decade between 2.1 and 3.8 per 100,000 people. This is worse than most of Europe, but comparable to modern day New York. This is also lower than other major cities such as Atlanta (19.0), Chicago (18.5), Boston (9.0), San Francisco (8.6), New York City (5.1), and San Jose (4.6). In 2007, Toronto's robbery rate also ranked relatively high, with 407.1 robberies per 100,000 people, compared to Detroit (675.1), Chicago (588.6), Los Angeles (348.5), Vancouver (366.2), New York City (265.9), Montreal (235.3), San Diego (158.8), and Portland (150.5).

While homicide rates in Toronto were relatively low for several years, they started to increase in 2016 until Toronto experienced the highest homicide rate among major Canadian cities in 2018; in that single year, the city surpassed the homicide rate of New York City. Homicide rates declined again in 2019; when compared across major metropolitan areas, the Greater Toronto Area ranked ninth in Canada with a homicide rate of 2.26 per 100,000.

== Late 1980s and early 1990s ==
Toronto
	Total Homicides	Gun Deaths	Total Shootings	
Year	Total Homicides	Gun Deaths	Occurrences	Victims
1990	55			
1991	89	38		
1992	65	15		
1993	59	25		
1994	65	25		
1995	61	13		
1996	58	22		
1997	61	24		
1998	58	13		
1999	49^{B}	18		
2000	61	25		
2001	61	33		
2002	65	28		
2003	67	31	326	
2004	64	27	191	
2005	80	52	359	359
2006	70	29	217	323
2007	86	43	205	242
2008	70	36	238	336
2009	62	36	256	338
2010	65	32	260	330
2011	51	27–28^{A}	227	281
2012	57	33	213	289
2013	57	22	202	255
2014	58	27	177	242
2015	59	27	288	429
2016	75	41	407	581
2017	65/66 ^{A}	39	395	594
2018	98^{C}	51	424	604
2019	79-80	44	495	760
2020	71	39	462	217
2021	85	46	409	209
2022	71	44	379	194
2023	73	29	345	168
2024	86	44	461	164
2025	45	20	263	121

^{A} Inconsistency in source data. ^{B} 1999: Lowest total since 1986. ^{C} 2018: Highest total to date.

In the late 1980s, gangs in Toronto were becoming increasingly violent. This coincided with the arrival of crack cocaine in the city, which caused more gun violence to occur in low-income neighborhoods. In 1988, Toronto Police were under scrutiny for a series of shootings of unarmed black men, dating back to the late 1970s. In 1991, Toronto experienced its most violent year with 89 murders (that murder tally was surpassed in 2018), 16 of which were linked to drug wars involving rival gangs. Much of the high murder toll of 1991 was due to a gang war in Chinatown between various Chinese gangs for the control of the drug trade.

On 4 May 1992, there were riots on Yonge Street, which followed peaceful protesting of a fatal shooting of a black man who was swinging a knife at a police officer. This was the eighth shooting of an assailant in four years, and fourth fatal one. Later that year, local activist Dudley Laws claimed that police bias against blacks was worse in Toronto than in Los Angeles.

== Late 1990s ==
Toronto recorded 49 homicides in 1999, which, as of 2026, remains the city's lowest homicide total since 1986. That year, there were a total of 90 homicides across Toronto's census metropolitan area, with a murder rate of 1.68 per 100,000 people.

== 2005–2014: "Year of the Gun", shootings and the falling murder rate ==
In 2005, Toronto media coined the term "Year of the Gun" because the number of gun-related homicides reached a record 52 out of 80 murders in total; almost double the 27 gun deaths recorded the previous year. On 26 December 2005, 15-year-old Jane Creba was shot and killed in the Boxing Day shooting while shopping on Yonge Street in downtown Toronto. After this incident, many people called for the federal government to ban handguns in Canada; this also became an issue in the 2006 federal election, but the number of homicides dropped to 70 in 2006.

However, 2007 saw another, smaller wave of gun violence starting in May with the shooting death of 15-year-old Jordan Manners at his school, C. W. Jefferys Collegiate Institute. A couple of months later, on 22 July 2007, 11-year-old Ephraim Brown was killed after being shot in the neck by a stray bullet, during a gang shooting in the city's North York district at Jane Street and Sheppard Avenue. These events raised calls for a ban on handguns once again. Of the 86 murders in 2007, half were via firearm; thus, Toronto had a murder rate of about 3.43 per 100,000, slightly less than the peak rate of 3.9 in 1991. There was a drop in murders again in 2008 with 70 (a total of 105 murders in the Greater Toronto Area – including a record high 27 occurring in neighbouring Peel Region (with Mississauga having a record 18 homicides, but statistically this was an anomalous year for Peel Region as a whole).

The falling murder totals continued in 2009 with 65, followed by 63 in 2010, then the lowest total in recent times with only 51 (75 total in the GTA) in 2011, the lowest homicide total since 1986 at a rate of 2.0 per 100,000, close to the national average, representing a further dramatic decline in the city's murder rate for the fourth consecutive year. The number of homicides stabilized to the mid-50s for the next 4 years. Overall, shooting incidents also declined, from 335 occurrences in 2010 to 255 reported in 2013, and reaching a decade-low 196 for 2014. Since 2014, gun violence has been steadily rising, with 395 shootings in 2017, 427 in 2018, and as well almost 500 in 2019.

== 2015–present ==
After a substantial decrease in homicides after the 2005 "year of the gun" and a stable period 2009–2015, the murder rate in Toronto started to increase again drastically in 2016. The homicide rate jumped to 75 homicides in 2016 and spiked in 2018 with 98 homicides in 2018, which is partially due to the Toronto van attack, which resulted in the murder of 10 people on 23 April. This increased Toronto's homicide rate to around 3.6 per 100,000 people in 2018, the highest among major Canadian cities and higher than New York City (around 3.51 per 100,000) for the same year. The homicide total dropped again in 2019 to 80 (a rate of 2.9 per 100,000 people) below the rate of most US cities, but still higher than the Canadian average of 1.8. 2020 saw another decrease in homicides with the city having a total of 71 murders for the year (a rate of around 2.6 per 100,000 people). However in 2021, the city saw an increase in homicides, with the city murders increasing to 85, giving Toronto a homicide rate of 3.04 per 100,000 people. A decrease in murders happened the following year with 71 being reported in 2022 (a murder rate of 2.5 per 100,000), which was then followed by a slight increase with 73 homicides being reported in 2023, giving the city a murder rate of 2.6 per 100,000 people. 2024 saw another increase in homicides with 86 being reported in the year, giving the city a homicide rate of around 3.1 per 100,000 residents.

In conjunction with that increase in murders, overall shooting incidents also increased from a low of 177 in 2014 to an all-time high of 495 in 2019, even outpacing gun incidents that occurred in 2018. The high number of shooting incidents in 2019, resulted in the city having a shooting rate of 18.1 per 100,000 people, which was double the shooting rate of New York City in the same year (9.1 per 100,000 residents). After the peak in 2019, the city saw a consistent decline in shootings for next years dropping all the way to 345 shooting incidents in 2023. The following year saw a 33.6% increase in shootings with 461 being reported throughout 2024. At the same time, gun deaths increased from a low of 22 in 2013 to a high of 51 in 2018 and dropped slightly to 44 in 2019, followed by another downtick gun deaths with 39 in 2020. 2021 saw an increase in gun murders with 46, followed by a decrease the next year with 44 in 2022.

== Organized crime ==
=== Victorian-Edwardian era ===
Large criminal organizations have been operating in the Toronto region since at least the mid-19th century, beginning with the homegrown, yet short-lived Markham Gang. Since that time, large-scale organized crime in Toronto has mostly been the domain of international or foreign-based crime syndicates. From the late 18th century and continuing well into the 20th century, Toronto was a city mostly inhabited by Protestants of British extraction. In the Victorian age and for some time afterward, Toronto came to be known as "Toronto the Good". Toronto in the first half of the 20th century was a city whose population was of overwhelmingly Anglo-Irish descent as the 1941 census showed that people whose families originated from the British isles made up 86% of the population while people whose families originated elsewhere made up 13% of the population. Not until the 1950-1960s following changes in immigration law did a significant number of people of non-British origin began to settle in Toronto, gradually changing Toronto from a city whose people were mostly of British descent into a city that is one of the most multicultural in North America.

Reflecting the influence of Victorian values, in Toronto as elsewhere in Canada laws were passed to regulate social behavior. Drugs such as cocaine and marijuana together with gambling were banned, prostitution was cracked down upon, and access to alcohol was limited. A British visitor to Toronto in 1896 stated: "Sunday is as melancholy and suicidal sort of day as Puritan principles can make it". As part of the effort to regulate social behavior, the Toronto police force went from 172 officers in 1872 to 600 officers by 1914. The majority of the Toronto policemen in this period were British immigrants with a disproportionate number of the police force being Ulster Protestants. The growth of the police force was due not to an increase in crime per se, but rather due to an increase in laws regulating social behavior as the major concerns of the Toronto police went from being burglary, vagrancy and breaking up fistfights in 1872 to enforcing laws regarding censorship, Sabbath-breaking, dance halls, gambling, alcohol consumption, street traffic, and all forms of "immorality" by 1914. One journalist, Harry Wodson, wrote that "Toronto the Good" was a city of "shall nots" as the city council had passed 6,000 bylaws regulating all forms of social behavior. Such laws created opportunities for organized crime which moved in to fill the demand for what at least certain segments of the population wanted, but were not legally able to enjoy.

The principal concern of the Toronto police in the early 20th century was a moral panic that prostitution was increasing as it was widely believed that organized crime was engaging in sexual slavery by kidnapping young women and forcing them into prostitution. The Canadian historian Charlotte Gray noted in fact most of the prostitutes in Toronto were not forced into sexual slavery, but rather chose to engage in prostitution due to poverty as many occupations were closed to women and wages in those that were open to women were significantly lower than offered to men. The area of Toronto that the newspapers were mostly concerned was an impoverished district known as "the Ward" that was bordered by College, Jarvis, University and Yonge streets. "The Ward" was mostly inhabited by Italian, Jewish, Finnish, Polish, West Indian and Chinese immigrants that was painted in lurid terms by the newspapers as a center of organized crime add depravity in general that was threatening society. Gray cautioned that such newspaper coverage of "the Ward" reflected more the prejudices of the era than its reality.

By the early 1900s, the infamous "Black Hand" had followed Italian immigrants to Toronto as it had in most major North American cities at the time. In 1907, in a much publicized case, a wealthy Toronto woman received a letter demanding she pay $500 to the "Brotherhood of the Black Hand" while warning if she contracted the police or the media "you and your husband will be murdered and your house will be blown up".

=== The Magaddino ascendency ===
Italian organized crime remains prevalent, with the Calabrian 'Ndrangheta such as the Siderno Group, as well as the Sicilian Mafia. During prohibition, Toronto became a major center for bootlegging operations into the United States, which also saw an increased presence of Italian-American organized crime — specifically the Buffalo crime family. The most important gangsters in Toronto area in the 1920s was Rocco Perri and his common-law wife Bessie Starkman, who were involved in smuggling alcohol into the United States and heroin into Canada. In May–June 1929, an undercover Royal Canadian Mounted Police officer, Frank Zaneth, posing as a drug dealer from Montreal, was able to purchase in Toronto considerable sums of cocaine, heroin and morphine from Tony Roma, Antonio Brassi, and Tony Defalco, all of whom worked for Perri and Starkman. In one of Toronto's first large scale drug busts, Roma was arrested at an illegal Toronto gambling house where the police found money, guns, ammunition and drugs. On 27 September 1929, Defalco and Brassi were convicted of drug trafficking while Roma fled to the United States while on bail, where he was arrested in 1936.

In 1931, when "the Commission" was founded in New York by Lucky Luciano, southern Ontario was assigned to Stefano Magaddino of Buffalo. In 1944–45, Magaddino consolidated his control by having Perri and a number of his associates murdered. The existence of the Mafia in Toronto was ignored in the post-war era until the 1960s by the media and the police. Much of the organized crime activities in Toronto area were the work of three Mafia families based in nearby Hamilton, namely the Musitano, Luppino and Papalia families. The most important and powerful of the three families of Hamilton were the Papalia family, who in turn were the Canadian branch of the Magaddino family of Buffalo. Though based in Hamilton, Johnny Papalia was very extensively involved in Toronto, where he engaged in extortion, hijacking, loan-sharking, theft, book-making and the sale of heroin. Michele Racco was regarded as the Capocrimine ("boss of bosses") in the 'Ndrangheta in Toronto from the 1950s until his death in 1980.

The first organized crime case that attracted widespread public attention was the beating of the gambler Maxie Bluestein by the gangster Johnny Papalia at Toronto's Town Tavern on 21 March 1961. Pierre Berton, a Toronto Star newspaper columnist wrote in his column that the Bluestein beating was a "semi-execution" committed in front of hundreds of people, which showed that Papalia did not fear the law. Berton made the Bluestein beating into a cause célèbre as he used his column to demand that Papalia be brought to justice. Berton described the beating: "...as terrible a beating as it is possible to give a man without killing him... Iron bars with ropes attached to them for greater leverage rained down on Bluestein's head and across his forehead, eyes and cheekbones. His scalp was split seven or eight times. Knuckledusters were smashed into his eyes and a broken bottle was ground into his mouth. When Bluestein dropped to the floor, he was kicked in the face. His overcoat, torn and slashed, was literally drenched in his own blood...When I saw Bluestein, some 10 days after the affair, he looked like a piece of meat". Berton's columns had their effect, causing massive public outrage and Papalia was ordered by his boss, Stefano Magaddino, to turn himself into the police in May 1961 as Magaddino complained that the police were making too raids in their search for Papalia.

In the 1950s–60s, a number of outlaw biker gangs such as the Vagabonds, the Para-Dice Riders and the Golden Hawk Riders were founded in the Toronto area. The most aggressive and dominant biker gang in the early 1960s were the Black Diamond Riders led by Harry Paul Barnes, whose attacks forced a number of other biker clubs to disband. It was largely to end the attacks of the Black Diamond Riders that four other biker gangs came together in 1965 to found Satan's Choice Motorcycle Club under the leadership of Bernie Guindon. Satan's Choice quickly became the most dominant biker gang not only in the Toronto area, but in Ontario, pushing the Black Diamond Riders into irrelevance. Satan's Choice became the largest biker gang in all of Canada, and the second-largest in the world by 1970, being eclipsed only by the Hells Angels. For many young people in late 1960s Toronto, Guindon was a folk hero, who was greatly admired as a "rebel" against "Toronto the Good" values. Until the 1990s, biker gangs in Canada were very much subordinate to the Mafia, which used them as subcontractors to do "dirty work" that they did not wish to do themselves.

The murders of two Toronto businessmen, namely Salvatore Trumbari on 6 January 1967 and his former employee Filippo Vendemini on 29 June 1969 brought greater public attention to the subject. Subsequently, it was established that both Trumbari and Vendemini were involved in organized crime, being engaged in bootlegging (bars and liquor stores closed early in Ontario at the time. making bootlegging profitable). Starting in the late 1960s, many businesses in Toronto's Little Italy neighborhoods who refused to pay extortion money or alternatively were late in their payments were the victims of arson while their employees were assaulted. Three brothers, Cosimo, Ernest and Anthony Commisso who owned several bakeries in Toronto were targeted for refusing to pay "taxes". On 17 July 1968, the home of Cosimo Commisso was shot up; on 29 March 1969 the home of Ernest Commisso was broken into and vandalized; on 31 March 1969 a bakery owned by the brothers was blown up; and on 2 June 1969 Anthony Commisso was shot five times in his legs. Toronto police reports show that in 1970 alone 32 Little Italy businesses were burned down in cases of mob-related arson. In 1970, the Toronto Mafiosi, Rocco Zito met with Vic Cotroni and Paolo Violi of Montreal's Cotroni family, and Paulo Gambino, the brother of Carlo Gambino of New York's Gambino family. Zito established a "pipeline" for smuggling heroin via Montreal and Toronto to New York. An article in the Toronto Star on 7 July 1972 linked most of the cases of bombings, arson and assaults in Little Italy to the Siderno Group, which was described as being the most aggressive of all the Mafia-type groups in Toronto.

Starting in 1945, the prosperity of the "long summer" economic boom that ended with the Arab oil shock of 1973–74 led to an enormous construction boom in Toronto. Most of the construction contractors in Toronto were immigrants from the Mezzogiorno (the south of Italy) while most of the construction workers were also Italian immigrants. In the Mezzogiorno, paying off groups such as the Mafia and the 'Ndrangheta is seen as a normal business cost. Italian organized crime groups infiltrated and took over the Toronto construction industry in the 1960s. In 1974, a Royal Commission headed by Justice Harold Waisberg in its report examining the influence of organized crime in the Toronto construction industry stated that starting in 1968 "a sinister array of characters were introduced to this industry". A key moment occurred in May 1971 when Cesido Romanelli, one of Toronto's largest construction contractors, agreed to hire Natale Luppino of Hamilton's Luppino crime family as his "escort" in exchange for which the Luppino family would intimidate Romanelli's workers and take over their unions. Luppino then took over the unions, who were demanding wage increases that Romanelli did not want to give them. At the same time, the Mafiosi Paul Volpe was hired by A. Gus Simone of Local 562 of the International Lathers Union to help "persuade" other construction unions to join the Lathers union. Accordingly, to Toronto police reports, between 1968 and 1972 at construction sites in Toronto there occurred 234 cases of major "willful damage", 23 cases of arson, 15 cases of mob-related assault, 5 explosions, and numerous cases of the theft of construction materials. Bruno Zanini, a journalist investigating Mafia influence in the construction industry was wounded in 1972 in an assassination attempt. In his report on 19 December 1974, Justice Waisberg concluded that the construction industry in Toronto had been taken over by the Mafia and a climate of fear reigned in the construction sites. Toronto has seven 'Ndrangheta clans, namely the Coluccio, DeMaria, Tavernese, Figliomeni, Ruso, Racco and Commisso clans. The Mafia and 'Ndrangheta engaged extensively in loan sharking and employed thugs to threaten and beat up people behind in their loans. The most known enforcers in the loan shark business were the team of Howard Chard and Marvin Elkind. Staff Superintendent Frank Barbetta of the Toronto police said of the duo: "Best collection team I ever ran into: Elkind and Chard. One guy makes the threats and the other looks like he can carry them out".

The Siderno Group had also moved into the Toronto construction industry and in particular specialized in taking over bids to build public buildings in order to inflate the costs with the additional costs being profit to them. The Toronto-based Commisso 'ndrina clan of the Siderno group were described by the end of the 1970s as running a crime empire that "imported and distributed heroin with the Vancouver mob and the Calabrian Mafia in Italy, fenced stolen goods across North America, printed and distributed counterfeit money throughout Canada and the United States, ran a vast extortion network in Ontario, arranged insurance and land frauds in the Toronto area and engaged in contract killings and contract enforcement work across Canada and the United States– the whole gamut of violent criminal activities one usually associates with the Mafia". Cecil Kirby, a Satan's Choice biker who worked as an enforcer and a hitman for the Commisso 'ndrina between 1976 and 1981 wrote in his 1986 book Mafia Enforcer: "I quickly learned that their big thing for making money was the construction industry. They probably made more money from extortions in the construction industry than they did from trafficking in heroin – and it was a helluva lot safer". The Commisso 'ndrina clan was led by the three Commisso brothers, Rocco, Michele and Cosimo, whose principal interest in life besides making money was avenging the murder of their father, Girolomo Commisso, who had been killed in 1948 in Siderno by rival gangsters. The best known of Kirby's crimes in the employ of the Commisso brothers in Toronto occurred on the morning of 3 May 1977 when he blew up a Chinese restaurant, the Wah Kew Chop Suey House, and killed a cook, Chong Yin Quan.

In the 1970s, the Triads entered Toronto with the two most important being the Big Circle Boys and the 14k Triad, both of Hong Kong, who smuggled in heroin from the "Golden Triangle" nations of Burma, Laos and Thailand. Starting around about 1975, complaints about extortion by the Triads in Toronto's Chinatown became common. In 1976, the Kong Lok Triad (which is Cantonese for "House of Mutual Happiness") was in Toronto. The Kong Lok is the Canadian branch of the Leun Kung Lok triad of Hong Kong. In 1979, a report from the Immigration department complained that the Kong Lok triad was very active in trying to recruit Chinese-Canadian high school students in Toronto to work as drug dealers. In 1978-1979, hundreds of thousands of "boat people" fled Vietnam and sailed across the South China Sea to Hong Kong. As part of the Commonwealth, Canada took in a considerable number of the "boat people" who had gone to Hong Kong. A 1980 RCMP report stated that the Kong Lok was aggressive seeking to recruit those "boat people" who were huaren (ethnic Chinese) to work for them. As a general rule, groups such as the Triads tended to co-operate with older established groups such as the Mafia and the 'Ndrangheta.

In July 1983, Frank Cotroni entered the Ontario market, sending out his favorite hitman Réal Simard to meet Papalia in order to inform him that the Cotroni family would now operating in Ontario and he expected the co-operation of the Papalia family, which Papalia gave. Simard wrote in his autobiography Le neveu: "The Toronto [strip] clubs were not producing much and had not for a while. The head of the Commisso family had been in prison since 1981, and no one was looking after things. Ontario was 15 years behind Quebec when it came to making money from the clubs". Simard founded the Prestige Entertainment Inc strippers' agency to bring Quebec strippers to Ontario, rented an apartment at the Sutton Palace Hotel, and travelled around in a Merendes-Benz automobile. Cotroni visited Toronto about once a month to see Simard, and during those visits, the gangster-boxer Eddie Melo served as his chauffeur-bodyguard. During his visits to Toronto, Cotroni always met with Rocco Zito, the leader of the Siderno group. In November 1983, Simard learned that two drug dealers from Montreal, Mario Héroux and Robert Hétu, had arrived to compete with the Cotroni family. Simard stormed into their Toronto hotel room to shoot both men, killing Héroux and wounding Hétu. After being arrested, Simard turned Crown's evidence and testified against Cotroni. Melo replaced Simard as the Cotroni family's Toronto agent, serving in that position until his murder on 6 April 2001. On 9 December 1983, Domenic Racco, the boss of the Siderno group, was murdered by the Musitano family associates. In the 1980s, Papalia sent out a crew of muscular Mafiosi led by Carmen Barillaro and Enio Mora to raid the illegal gambling houses in Toronto's Greektown in the Pape-Danforth area that refused to pay him extortion money. The raids were noted for their brutality as Barillaro, Mora and the others beat up and robbed the patrons with much viciousness and in one case sliced up the ear of the owner of a gambling house. In December 1985, Barillaro, Mora and several other Mafiosi were all charged by the Ontario Provincial Police as part of Project Outhouse for their actions in the Greektown raids, but none of the accused were ever brought to trial.

The 1984 Anglo-Chinese treaty to return Hong Kong to China by 1997 led to an exodus of Hong Kong residents, many of whom went to Canada as another part of the Commonwealth. Canada became the preferred place of refuge for Hong Kongers because of its liberal immigration policies. A number of Triads took advantage of the influx to move to Canada, which was popular for them as it offered easier opportunities to smuggle drugs and people into the United States. In addition, extortion of businesses is a major source of income for the Triads in Hong Kong, and so when many Hong Kong businessmen immigrated to Canada in the 1980s, the Triads followed them to continue the extortion of their old targets in the New World. In 1986, a Toronto Police report charged that a number of Triad leaders from Hong Kong were now living in Toronto and were "funneling millions of illegally earned dollars into Toronto real estate and businesses to form a power base from which to direct their worldwide operations". The Triads commonly used Vietnamese gangs as subcontractors to do their "dirty work" for them. Peter Yuen of the Toronto Police Service recalled about the violence between various Asian crime factions in 1990: "You had gun battles, 15 rounds at the corner of Dundas and Spadina on a Saturday afternoon...It was like watching a triad movie. And the cops were just like dogs, too. We wanted to tell them, 'We own these streets.'".

In 1987, Donald "Snorkel" Melanson, the president of the Vagabonds biker gang fell into a drug debt were $80,000 to the Hells Angels Montreal chapter. Melanson was known as "Snorkel" due to his practice of using a snorkel to consume cocaine. On the night of 2 September 1987, Melson to a hotel on Yonge Street to pay back $50,000 of his drug debt; he was found dead the next day with a bullet in his head by the hotel cleaning staff. Brian "Bo" Beaucage, generally considered to be the most violent and vicious member of Satan's Choice, spent the night of 3 March 1991 in a Toronto rooming house devoted to hard drugs, alcohol, and watching pornographic films. Beaucage's night of bacchanalian excess was cut short when he was beheaded in his bed by Frank Passarelli, a member of the Loners gang, who used a kitchen knife to decapitate him. The gruesome nature of Beaucage's murder, made worse by the fact that his body was partially devoured by dogs after his death, led to it acquiring a legendary reputation in biker community, being known incorrectly as "the fifty whacks with an ax".

=== The Rizzuto family-Hells Angels ascendency ===
In the summer of 1995, a biker war broke out between the Loners Motorcycle Club led by Gennaro "Jimmy" Raso vs. the Diablos led by Frank Lenti for the control of the drug trade. The Diablos were supported by Satan's Choice Motorcycle Club led by Bernie Guindon. On 18 July 1995, a Diablo incinerated a tow truck owned by a Loner with a homemade bomb; in retaliation two Diablos were shot and wounded by the Loners on the streets of Toronto. On 1 August 1995, the Satan's Choice clubhouse in Toronto was hit by a rocket fired from a rocket launcher, and two weeks later the Loners' clubhouse was likewise hit by a rocket launcher. On 25 August 1995, Lenti was badly wounded by a bomb planted in his car, which marked the end of the biker war as his club collapsed as he recovered from his injuries during a prolonged stay in a hospital. The mayor of Toronto, Barbara Hall, who was not aware that the biker war was over, attempted to ban all outlaw bikers from the city limits of Toronto. The journalist Jerry Langton wrote the "frequently hysterical Toronto media" vastly exaggerated the amount of biker war violence, which in turn led to Hall's overreaction. Hall's attempt to close Satan's Choice Toronto clubhouse failed owing to the Charter of Rights and Freedoms, which led her to instead try to have the city of Toronto buy the clubhouse in order to close it. Satan's Choice set a preposterously high price for their clubhouse, which caused much controversy in Toronto when Hall stated her willingness to have the city pay it. The controversy is believed to have been a factor in Hall's defeat in her 1997 reelection bid as the media took to mockingly calling Hall "Biker Barb".

Dany Kane, a police informer inside the Hells Angels' Montreal puppet club, the Rockers, reported to his handlers on 20 February 1996 that Donald Stockford and David Carroll of the Angels' Montreal chapter had a meeting in Saint-Sauveur to discuss a plan to smuggle narcotics from Montreal to the Toronto area. Kane reported: "Their goal was to take a big part of the Toronto drug market". Kane reported that both Stockford and Carroll were selling massive quantities of drugs to various Toronto biker gangs. Reflecting the tendency of the outlaw biker subculture to become part of the mainstream of Toronto life, in the fall of 1997, Donny Petersen, a prominent Toronto businessman and the vice-president of the Para-Dice Riders, became the first outlaw biker to address the prestigious Empire Club of Toronto, which Langton noted was "...an honor normally reserved for heads of state and titans of industry".

In 1996, Vito Rizzuto, the boss of Montreal's Rizzuto crime family, made a $7.2 million loan to Mora who in turn gave the money to Papalia and Barillaro. Some of the money was used to open a restaurant in Toronto while the rest just vanished. Rizzuto decided to liquate the Papalia family, starting with Mora who was murdered on 11 September 1996. Rizzuto's instruments for killing Papalia and Barillaro were the Musitano brothers, who in exchange for accepting Rizzuto's "protection" from the vengeful Buffalo family had to accept being subordinate to the Rizzuto family. In April 1997, Pasquale Musitano met in Niagara Falls with Gaetano "Guy" Panepinto, the Toronto agent of the Rizzuto family. On 31 May 1997, Papalia was killed, followed up by Barillaro on 23 July 1997. On 22–23 October 1997, Rizzuto had dinners with Panepinto and Musitano, where he appointed Panepinto his Ontario lieutenant and placed Musitano under his authority. Panepinto was the owner of Casket Royale coffin company located on St. Clair Avenue and was widely known in Toronto for his television ads where he proclaimed "do not make your emotional loss a financial loss" as he boasted that his coffins were the cheapest in Toronto. Other key allies of Rizzuto in Ontario were the Caruana and Cammalleri families. Panepinto's crew were noted for their steroid abuse and a fondness for gyms. Panepitno specialized in selling ecstasy, marihuana, and the so-called "date rape drug" GHB. Panepinto came into conflict with the Commisso 'ndrina and had two of their members, Domenic Napoli and Antonio Oppedisano, murdered in March 2000. The Commisso brothers visited Montreal to meet Rizzuto, who disclaimed all knowledge of the murders. Rizzuto was furious that Panepinto had ordered murders without seeking his permission first, and withdrew his "protection" of Panepinto, meaning that Panepinto could be killed without fear of Rizzuto family retaliation. On 3 October 2000, Panepinto was shot dead on Bloor Street in his automobile by gunmen in a mini-van that pulled up next to his vehicle while he was waiting for a red light and pumped six bullets into him. Panepinto was replaced as the Rizzuto family's Toronto agent by Juan Ramon Fernandez, a Spanish man twice deported from Canada. A notable partner for the Rizzuto family was the Toronto-based Tse Chi Lop of the Big Circle Boys, who negotiated with Rizzuto to arrange for the Rizzuto family to smuggle into the United States the heroin from the "Golden Triangle" that the Big Circle Boys had smuggled into Canada.

In the summer of 2000, the Hells Angels national president Walter Stadnick made an offer to most Ontario outlaw biker clubs to join the Hells Angels on a "patch for patch" basis (i.e. with patches equivalent to their current patches) provided that they did so by the end of the year. On 29 December 2000, in a ceremony at the Hells Angels' "mother chapter" clubhouse in Sorel, most of the Ontario outlaw biker gangs, such as Satan's Choice, the Vagabonds, the Lobos, the Last Chance, the Para-Dice Riders and some of the Loners, all joined the Hells Angels, making them at one stroke the dominant outlaw biker club in Ontario. As a result of the mass "patch-over" in Sorel, with 168 outlaw bikers becoming Hells Angels, the greater Toronto area went from having no Hells Angels chapters to having the highest concentration of Hells Angels' chapters in the world. Stadnick changed the relationship of the Hells Angels from being subcontractors of the Mafia to being equals. The journalist Julian Sher stated in 2008: "Stadnick is part of that key cocaine industry that turns the Hells Angels from basically gofer boys of the Mafia into powerbrokers who are sitting down with the Mafia and negotiating the price of cocaine".

Donny Petersen of the Para-Dice Riders joined the Hells Angels to become their national secretary and principal spokesman. Petersen was a favorite of the Toronto media in the first decade of the 21st century as he always provided a good news story. On 12 January 2002, a Hells Angels convention in Toronto was gate-clashed by the mayor of Toronto, Mel Lastman, who was photographed shaking hands with an Angel, Tony Biancaflora, and the mayor told the media that the Angels were "fantastic" for bringing so much "business" to Toronto, saying: "You know, they're just a nice bunch of guys". Lastman's comments caused immense controversy in Toronto. The Rizzuto family is closely allied with the Hells Angels, and the same alliance continued in Ontario. Juan Ramon Fernandez, the Rizzuto family's agent for Ontario, was often talking in Toronto with Steven "Tiger" Lindsay, one of the best known Hells Angels in the Toronto region, about plans to commit various crimes. One of the most notorious crimes in recent Toronto history was a joint operation of the Rizzuto family and the Hells Angels. On 21 April 2014, the Hells Angel Paris Christoforou and the Mafiosi Antonio Borrelli shot up the California Sandwiches restaurant in north Toronto in an unsuccessful attempt to kill Michele Modica that left an innocent by-stander, Louise Russo, paralyzed from the neck down. A leading Hells Angel was David "White Dread" Buchanan, the sergeant-at-arms of the West Toronto chapter, who was also one of Toronto's principal gunrunners who sold guns that the Angels had smuggled in from the United States to various street gangs of Toronto. The white Jamaican immigrant Buchanan had once belonged to the Crips gang, and he served as their principal gunrunner and drug wholesaler after he joined the Hells Angels in 2000. Buchanan was shot and killed by Frank Lenti in a Toronto strip club on 2 December 2006 after he threatened and struck Lenti several times.

The most significant blow the police have inflicted against the Hells Angels in Toronto to date was Project Develop in 2005–2007. In September 2005, David Atwell, the sergeant-at-arms of the Angels downtown Toronto chapter, became an agent source informer for the Ontario Provincial Police. On the basis of the information gathered by Atwell, the police ordered a series of raids on Hell Angels clubhouses across Ontario on 4 April 2007. In 2010–2011, Atwell served as the main witness for the Crown during the trial of the downtown Toronto chapter members. The trial ended on 22 May 2011 with the chapter president John "Winner" Neal together with Mehrdad "Juicy" Bahman and Douglas Myles convicted of trafficking in GMB; Lorne Campbell was convicted of cocaine trafficking; and Larry Pooler convicted of the possession of a banned weapon. All of the accused were acquitted on the charges of gangsterism.

=== Modern era ===
Today, the multicultural face of Toronto is well reflected in the city's underworld, which includes everything from Jamaican posses to Eastern European bratvas to American biker gangs. The genesis of many foreign criminal organizations in Toronto has often been linked to the drug trade, as with the large influx of heroin and various Asian triads during the 1970s, or cocaine and South American cartels in the 1980s. These criminal groups, however, occasionally have a political bent as well, as with the Tamil organized crime groups such as the VVT and rival AK Kannan gangs, which warred with each other in the city's streets during the 1990s and early 2000s over the brown heroin trade. In recent decades, Toronto has also seen an infiltration of major American street gangs such as the Bloods, Crips, and Mara Salvatrucha.

In the early 2010s, a consortium known as the Wolfpack Alliance, who were the distributors of high-grade cocaine from the Sinaloa Cartel was active in Toronto. In the spring of 2012, the Wolfpack was going to bring to Toronto a shipment of 200 kilograms cocaine from Mexico worth $5 million with the profits to be split four ways between Johnny Raposo, Nick Nero, Martino "Lil Guy" Caputo, and Rabih Alkhalil. Nero, Caputo and Alkhalil decided to kill Raposo to take his share of the profits for themselves. In one of Toronto's best known gangland murders, on 18 June 2012, Raposo was shot and killed in the Sicilian Sidewalk Cafe on College Street by a Wolfpack hitman, Dean Michael Wiwchar. On 23 May 2016, Sukhvir Singh Deo, a member of the Independent Soldiers gang as well as the Wolfpack consortium, attracted international attention by loudly abusing the referees at Scotiabank Arena for supposed bias against the Toronto Raptors basketball team, whom Deo supported. The footage of Deo's behavior led to a number of YouTube videos being made about him as an example of a rude and obnoxious Raptors fan, and attracted the attention of Deo's enemies. On 7 June 2016, Deo was murdered in Toronto by two hitmen disguised as construction workers. Later in June 2016, another Wolfpack member, Tassos Leventis, threw a chair at the Commisso brothers in a Toronto restaurant. On 30 January 2017, Leventis was shot on George Street in Toronto and was able to make his way into his condo, where he bled to death.

There has also been recent evidence of significant cooperation between major organized crime groups including in gambling. In 2013 the Platinum Sportsbook a sports betting ring, thought have brought in over $100 million in revenue, was a joint venture between Hells Angels, Italian Mafia and Asian organized crime figures. Most of what is described as being "Mafia" activity in Toronto is more properly the work of the Calabrian 'Ndrangheta, whose operations in Toronto are headed by seven "families" that are reportedly organized into a board. By contrast, organized crime in Montreal is dominated by the Sicilian Mafia, especially the Rizzuto family. According to an Italian police report in July 2010, the "entire complex criminal organization" in Canada is all ultimately under the control of the Rizzuto family.

Critics have argued that organized crime has been allowed to flourish in Canadian cities such as Toronto due to the difficulty and cost of prosecuting organized crime cases compared with individual cases, and the flexible minimum sentencing and the double time served stipulations that the judicial system utilizes to unburden the penal system. Today, Toronto has become a center for a wide array of organized and transnational criminal activities, including the counterfeiting of currency, bank cards, and digital entertainment products, together with telemarketing fraud and the production of marijuana and synthetic drugs.

== Youth gangs ==
=== Early history ===
In his 1945 book Street Gangs in Toronto: A Study of the Forgotten Boy, Kenneth H. Rogers identified the following gangs active at that time in the following areas of the city:

- Moss Park – Riverdale: Brown Gang, Grey Gang, Porter Gang
- Withrow Park: Beavers, Britch Gang, Graphic Gang (Rogers refers to at least 4 other unnamed gangs in this area)
- North Toronto: Evans Gang, King Gang, Wunkies
- Rosedale: Arnot Gang, Basket Gang, Black Gang, Green Gang, Grey Gang (Rogers refers to 2 other unnamed gangs in this area)
- Bathurst & Queen: Aces Gang, Aggies, Bridge Gang, Cardinal Group, George Gang, Harris Gang, Mix Gang, Park Gang, Rustler Gang, Trapper Gang

Most of these gangs were simply loose-knit groups of juvenile delinquents involved mainly in low-level, petty crimes such as gambling, shop-lifting, and pick-pocketing (Rogers was actually robbed by members of the King Gang while attempting to interview them). The composition of the gangs were mainly poor Caucasian youth of British descent, although some were more ethnically diverse such as the George Gang (Jewish), the Mix Gang (black), and the Aggies (Polish & Ukrainian).

=== Current prevalence of youth gangs ===
Rates of youth gang activity in Toronto can be challenging to measure due to conflicting definitions of gangs, the smaller size of youth gangs, and their looser organization. Some research found 11% of Toronto high school students and 27% of Toronto homeless youth identified as being gang members at some point in their lives. Other research found under 6% of high school students and 16% of street youth identify as current gang members — but that only 4% of students and 15% of street youth were involved in gangs of a criminal (rather than social) nature.

One study has reported that approximately 2,400 high school students in Toronto claim to have carried a gun at least once between 2004 and 2005. Research has found that most youth gang-related crime consists of property offenses, drugs sales, drug use, and physical conflicts with other gangs. Social activities are more widely reported amongst self-identified youth gang members than criminal activities. Murder and other more grievous types of crime are uncommon.

Since 2021, auto theft in Canada, particularly in Toronto, has spiked, with more than 12,000 thefts in the city in 2023 alone. Violent carjackings have also become more prevalent, with nearly two-thirds of carjacking-related arrests involving youth. In 2023, a Criminal Intelligence Service Canada report stated that organized crime groups are at play, with 63 in Ontario and Quebec alone. The majority of the cars are transported to the Port of Montreal where they are then shipped overseas to Africa, the Middle East and Asia for resale.

=== Demographics of youth gang members ===
Although most youth gang members are male, mixed-gender and female youth gangs also exist. Youth from lower-income families are more likely to self-identify as gang members, but membership cuts across lower, middle and upper income categories. One study found that although black, Asian and Hispanic youth in Toronto are more likely to report gang activity than youth of other ethnicities, 27% of criminal youth gang members self-identify as white (followed by 23% black, 3% Aboriginal, 18% South Asian, 17% East Asian, 5% Middle Eastern and 7% Hispanic). A correlation has not been found between youth gang membership and immigration status. Gang-involved youth commonly report a history of abuse and/or neglect, poverty, dysfunctional families, isolation, school failure, and other psychosocial issues.

=== Community and police response ===
Efforts to reduce youth gang crime have included police raids, government and social programs, and camera surveillance of public housing projects.

== See also ==
- 2006 Toronto terrorism case
- Crime in Canada
- Danzig Street shooting (2012), a youth-gang mass shooting
- Gun politics in Canada

== Books and articles ==
- Auger, Michel; Edwards, Peter (2012). The Encyclopedia of Canadian Organized Crime: From Captain Kidd to Mom Boucher. Toronto: McClelland & Stewart. ISBN 978-0771030499.
- Cédilot, André; Noël, André (2012). Mafia Inc.: The Long, Bloody Reign of Canada's Sicilian Clan. Toronto: Vintage Canada. ISBN 9780307360410.
- Edwards, Peter (2013). Unrepentant The Strange and (Sometimes) Terrible Life of Lorne Campbell, Satan's Choice and Hells Angels Biker. Toronto: Vintage Canada. ISBN 9780307362575.
- Edwards, Peter; Nicaso, Antonio (2016). Business Or Blood Mafia Boss Vito Rizzuto's Last War. Toronto: Random House. ISBN 9780345813770.
- Edwards, Peter; Nájera, Luis (2021). The Wolfpack The Millennial Mobsters Who Brought Chaos and the Cartels to the Canadian Underworl. Toronto: Random House of Canada. ISBN 9780735275409.
- Gray, Charlotte (2013). The Massey Murder: A Maid, Her Master and the Trial that Shocked a Country. Toronto: HarperCollins. ISBN 9781443409254.
- Henderson, Stuart Robert (2011). Making the Scene: Yorkville and Hip Toronto in the 1960s. Toronto: University of Toronto Press. ISBN 978-1442610712.
- Humphreys, Adrian (1999). The Enforcer:Johnny Pops Papalia, A Life and Death in the Mafia. Toronto, Canada: Harper Collins. ISBN 0-00-200016-4.
- Humphreys, Adrian (2011). The Weasel: A Double Life in the Mob. Toronto: John Wiley & Sons. ISBN 978-0470964514.
- Langton, Jerry (2010). Showdown: How the Outlaws, Hells Angels and Cops Fought for Control of the Streets. Toronto: John Wiley & Sons. ISBN 978-0470678787.
- Langton, Jerry (2015). Cold War How Organized Crime Works in Canada and Why It's About to Get More Violent. Toronto: HarperColllins. ISBN 978-1-4434-3255-9.
- Martel, Marcel (2014). Canada the Good A Short History of Vice Since 1500. Waterloo: Wilfrid Laurier University Press. ISBN 9781554589487.
- Melcher, Graeme (2018). "Rebellion on the Road and Outlaw Biker Clubs in Postwar Ontario". In Peter Gossage; Robert Rutherdale (eds.). Making Men, Making History: Canadian Masculinities across Time and Place. Vancouver: University of British Columbia Press. pp. 364–382. ISBN 978-0774835664.
- Schneider, Stephen (2009). Iced The Story of Organized Crime in Canada. Toronto: John Wiley & Songs. ISBN 9780470835005.
- Sher, Julian; Marsden, William (2003). The Road To Hell How the Biker Gangs Are Conquering Canada. Toronto: Alfred Knopf. ISBN 0-676-97598-4.
