= Markham =

Markham may refer to:

== Biology ==
- Markham's storm-petrel (Oceanodroma markhami), a seabird species found in Chile and Colombia
- Markham's grass mouse (Abrothrix olivaceus markhami), a rodent subspecies found on Wellington Island and the nearby Southern Patagonian Ice Field in southern Chile
- Ulmus americana 'Markham', an American elm cultivar

== People ==
- Markham (surname)
- Nick Markham, Baron Markham (born 1968), British business executive
- Markham baronets, two baronetcies created for persons with the surname Markham
- Mrs Markham, the pseudonym of Elizabeth Penrose (1780-1837), an English writer
- Robert Markham, a pseudonym created by Glidrose Publications in the mid-1960s to continue the James Bond book series

== Places ==
=== Antarctica ===
- Markham Bay (Antarctica), James Ross Island
- Mount Albert Markham, in the Churchill Mountains
- Mount Markham, in the Queen Elizabeth Range

=== Canada ===
- Markham By-Pass (disambiguation), multiple uses
- Markham Ice Shelf, formerly attached to Ellesmere Island, Nunavut
- Markham, Ontario, a city
  - Markham Village, Ontario, the traditional downtown of the city

=== Papua New Guinea ===
- Markham Bay (Papua New Guinea)
- Markham District, Morobe Province
- Markham Valley
  - Markham River, in the valley

=== United Kingdom ===
- Markham, Caerphilly, a village in Wales

=== United States ===
- Markham House (disambiguation), multiple locations
- Markham, Illinois, a city
- Markham, Morgan County, Illinois, an unincorporated community
- Markham, Minnesota, an unincorporated community
- Markham, Portland, Oregon, a neighborhood in the city of Portland
- Markham, Texas, a census-designated place
- Markham, Virginia (disambiguation), multiple locations
- Markham, Washington, a census-designated place (CDP)
- Bellefontaine/Governor Markham, Pasadena, California, a neighborhood in the city of Pasadena
- Meriden Markham Municipal Airport, a public-use airport located near Meriden, Connecticut
- Markham Mound, one of three burial mounds in the village of Zaleski, Ohio, United States
- Markham Regional Arboretum, a natural arboretum located in Concord, California
- Gensburg-Markham Prairie, also known as Markham Prairie, a tallgrass prairie located in Markham in the Chicago Metropolitan Area

== Other uses ==
- Markham & Co., an ironworks and steelworks company near Chesterfield, Derbyshire, England
- Markham Vineyards, vineyards located in the city of St. Helena, California, United States
- Markham (TV series), starring Ray Milland, which aired in the United States during the 1959-60 season
- Markham (video game), a 1983 video game
- Markham College, a school in Lima, Peru
- Markham languages, a subgroup of the Huon Gulf languages with Lower and Upper subgroups

== See also ==
- Markham Gang, a notorious criminal organization located primarily in Ontario, Canada in the middle of the 19th century
- A cluster of places in Nottinghamshire, England:
  - East Markham
  - West Markham
  - Markham Moor
- Greater Markham Area gas fields, a North Sea natural gas field, partly in the United Kingdom and partly in the Netherlands
- Markam
- Markam County, Tibet Autonomous Region, China
- Marcum, a list of people with the surname
