= Marcum =

Marcum is a surname. Notable persons with that name include:

- Art Marcum, American 21st century screenwriter
- Deanna B. Marcum (1946–2022), American librarian and nonprofit leader
- Diana Marcum (1963–2023), American journalist and writer
- Eric Marcum, subject of the United States v. Marcum Court of Appeals case
- John Marcum (born 1995), ARCA founder, NASCAR official
- Johnny Marcum (1909–1984), American Major League Baseball pitcher
- Justin Marcum (born 1984), American politician
- Leo Marcum (1942–2023), American politician and lawyer
- Shaun Marcum (born 1981), American former Major League Baseball pitcher
- Tim Marcum (1944–2013), American football coach

== See also ==
- Marcum Q-function, mathematical function
- Marcom (disambiguation)
  - Micheline Aharonian Marcom (born 1968), American writer
- Markham (disambiguation)
- Morecambe (disambiguation)
