= Year of the Gun =

Year of the Gun may refer to:

- Year of the Gun (film), 1991 film
- a term coined by Toronto media; see Crime in Toronto
