= Paul Volpe =

Paul Volpe may refer to:

- Paul Volpe (mobster), Italian-Canadian mobster
- Paul Volpe (poker player), American poker player
