= Markham House =

Markham House may refer to:

== United States ==
(by state)

- Markham House (Atlanta, Georgia), an 1875 former hotel
- Markham House (Dublin, New Hampshire), NRHP-listed
- Markham Cobblestone Farmhouse and Barn Complex, Lima, New York, NRHP-listed
- Markham-Albertson-Stinson Cottage, Nags Head, North Carolina, NRHP-listed
- Markham School and Teacherage, Oilton, Oklahoma, listed on the NRHP in Creek County, Oklahoma
- Markham Farmstead, Conde, South Dakota, listed on the NRHP in Spink County, South Dakota
