= Michele Racco =

Italian criminal

- Born: 12 December 1913; Siderno Marina, Calabria, Italy
- Died: 4 January 1980 (aged 66); Toronto, Ontario, Canada
- Other names: Mike the Baker
- Occupation: Crime boss
- Spouse: Rosa Racco
- Children: 1
- Allegiance: Siderno Group

Michele Racco (December 12, 1913 – January 4, 1980), known as "Mike the Baker", was an Italian-Canadian gangster, regarded as the founder of the Siderno Group.

== Early life ==
Racco was born in Siderno Marina, Calabria, Italy on December 12, 1913, into a poor family. He joined the 'Ndrangheta as a young man and was already considered to be a senior leader when he immigrated to Canada in 1952. He first settled in Port Arthur (modern Thunder Bay) and moved to Toronto in 1953. He opened a bakery on St. Clair Avenue West, which became the beginning of a chain of bakeries, coffee shops and ice cream parlours owned by him.

== "The Godfather of Toronto" ==
Racco maintained close contacts with the Luppino crime family in Hamilton, Ontario and with the Cotroni crime family in Montreal. By 1962, Racco established a crimini and Camera di Controllo in Canada with the help of Giacomo Luppino and Rocco Zito. Salvatore Triumbari and Filippo Vendemini were also co-founders until Racco sanctioned their murders in 1967 and 1969 respectively, due to disputes. Racco had been urged to start the Canadian operation by Antonio Macrì, the undisputed boss of Siderno until he was killed in January 1975.

Racco had a criminal conviction in his native Italy, but was never convicted of any crime in Canada. In the 1960s, most of Racco's bakeries were burned down in cases of arson. The police initially thought he was being targeted by rival gangsters, but concluded that Racco was burning down his own bakeries to collect the insurance money as it became apparent that the arsonists were entering his bakeries with suspicious ease. The closest thing he came to being charged was an incident where the Toronto police found $25,000 in counterfeit money in one of his bakeries, but were unable to lay charges as the police had no evidence that Racco knew of the counterfeit money in his bakery, which he insisted had been brought into the store by a dishonest employee.

By 1971, Racco was considered to be the most powerful gangster in Toronto, which led him to limit the amount of extortion-related violence in Toronto's Little Italy district, which was attracting too much media attention. On March 20, 1971, during a wire-tapped phone call, Racco was heard discussing the "youth of honors" (including his own son) who would be allowed to join "the Honored Society" (a euphemism for the 'Ndrangheta). The initiation ceremony was raided by the police and Racco was warned not to attend the meeting. During another wire-tapped phone call to an American gangster, Racco was heard to say: "Jesus Christ, I really can't go into details here. You know, um, 'Ndrina." Racco initially answered to the Buffalo crime family, but after the death of Stefano Magaddino in 1974, he established close ties with Paolo Violi, the de facto boss of the Cotroni family of Montreal. Racco was also a very close ally of Paul Volpe.

Racco was greatly worried about his drug addict son, Domenic Racco, who was considered to be reckless and violent. On July 19, 1971, Domenic Racco shot three men in a Toronto shopping mall following an argument over a cigarette; he was sentenced to 10 years in jail for attempted murder and was released on parole in 1978. Racco called a meeting to discuss ways to help his son beat the charges, and invited Johnny Papalia of Hamilton to attend the meeting. The journalist Adrien Humphreys wrote: "That Mike Racco, the pre-eminent immigrant Italian criminal, invited Canadian-born Johnny to this important family meeting was a mark of great respect". Roy McMurtry, the future Ontario Attorney-General met Racco in 1975 while he was still serving as a defense lawyer and described him as "the cruelest looking person I have ever seen". McMurtry stated that Racco was a stereotypical gangster straight out of a Hollywood film in every respect, saying he gave off a strong sense of malevolent power.

Racco was aggressive in denying the existence of organized crime, once telling a journalist "What is this Mafia? You really believe it exists?" Racco was the capo crimini ("boss of bosses") of the 'Ndrangheta in Toronto, and had close ties with other gangsters in the United States and Italy. Despite his denials, the media referred to Racco as the "godfather of Toronto". Racco ordered the three murders, namely of Triumbari in 1967 and Vendemini in 1969. In 1976, he had Salvatore Palermiti killed while he was visiting Toronto.

== Later years and death ==
As Racco was dying of cancer in the late 1970s, he asked for Papalia to look after his son and keep him away from cocaine. Papalia took this request seriously, but he found that Domenic Racco was a hothead incapable of taking advice. Papalia complained with disgust that Domenic Racco, when eating dinner with him at Rooney's restaurant in Toronto, would rush off to snort cocaine in the restroom as he had no self-control when it came to cocaine.

Racco died of cancer on January 4, 1980. He had one of the largest Mafia funerals ever in Toronto that was attended by 200 people. Rocco Zito and Racco's nephew Rocco Remo Commisso were among his pallbearers. Domenic Racco did not last long as a boss, and was murdered on December 10, 1983, on the order of the Musitano crime family in Hamilton for violating cocaine trade agreements.

== Books ==
- Edwards, Peter; Auger, Michel (2004). The Encyclopedia of Canadian Organized Crime. Toronto: McClelland & Stewart. ISBN 0-7710-3044-4.
- Humphreys, Adrian (1999). The Enforcer:Johnny Pops Papalia, A Life and Death in the Mafia. Toronto, Canada: Harper Collins. ISBN 0-00-200016-4.
- Langton, Jerry (2015). Cold War How Organized Crime Works in Canad and Why It's About to Get More Violent. Toronto: HarperColllins. ISBN 978-1-4434-3255-9.
- McMurtry, Roy (2013). Memoirs and Reflections. Toronto: University of Toronto Press. ISBN 9781442616622.
- Schneider, Stephen (2009). Iced: The Story of Organized Crime in Canada (2nd ed.). Toronto: John Wiley & Sons. ISBN 978-0470835005.
