= Morcombe =

Morcombe is a surname. Notable people with the surname include:

- Bruce Morcombe (born 1959), Australian child safety advocate
- Chris Morcombe (born 1975), Australian rugby league footballer
- Denise Morcombe (born 1960), Australian child safety advocate

== See also ==
- Murder of Daniel Morcombe
- Morecambe (disambiguation)
