= Marcom =

Marcom or MARCOM may refer to:

== Acronym ==
- United States Maritime Commission, an agency of the U.S. federal government from 1936 to 1950
- Canadian Forces Maritime Command, the name used by the Royal Canadian Navy from 1968 to 2011
- Maritime Community, a programme of the European Union which includes the Mediterranean Science Commission
- NATO Allied Maritime Command

== Other uses ==
- Marketing communications
- Micheline Aharonian Marcom (born 1968), American writer

== See also ==
- Marcum, a surname
- Marcum Marc Reagan (born c. 1967), NASA trainer
