= Marvin Elkind =

Canadian police informer (1934–2024)

- Born: 13 March 1934; Toronto, Ontario, Canada
- Died: 21 January 2024 (aged 89); Mississauga, Ontario, Canada
- Resting place: Pardes Chaim Cemetery, Vaughan, Ontario, Canada
- Other name: "The Weasel"
- Occupations: Gangster; police informer; professional boxer
- Convictions: Fraud and money laundering (1969); Assault causing bodily harm (1988)
- Penalty: 1 year imprisonment (1969); 90 days' imprisonment (1988)

Marvin Elkind (13 March 1934 – 21 January 2024), better known as "The Weasel", was a Canadian gangster, professional boxer and police informer. Elkind was involved in organized crime for decades and associated with crime figures in Toronto, Montreal and New York, and also served as the chauffeur of Teamsters union president Jimmy Hoffa. In 1983, he turned police informer and became Canada's most prolific confidential informant, working for the Ontario Provincial Police (OPP), the Royal Canadian Mounted Police (RCMP) and the United States Federal Bureau of Investigation (FBI).

== Early life ==
Elkind was born in Toronto, the son of poor Jewish immigrants from Eastern Europe. His mother, Beatrice Feldstein, was a Jewish immigrant from Romania while his father, Aaron Elkind, was a Jewish immigrant from Russia. Elkind said of his family: "My father was a bad guy. He hung around bad guys and was always getting into some trouble". Elkind described his mother as his main emotional support. Aaron Elkind abandoned his family in 1937 after a failed bank robbery attempt, and his mother remarried to her brother-in-law, Morris Elkind. The remarriage had been ordered by an Orthodox rabbi in accordance with traditional Jewish law that declared the brother had the responsibility to marry the wife of his brother if the husband was no longer around. Aaron Elkind returned to the Soviet Union where he continued his criminal activities which ended when he was executed in 1946.

Morris Elkind hated his stepson, who had a marked resemblance to his father in terms of appearance and personality, and Marvin Elkind recalled his stepfather as an emotionally cruel man who never extended him any love. Marvin recalled that his uncle/stepfather loved everyone except for him and his father. Morris Elkind was a devout Orthodox Jew who was ashamed of his disreputable older brother and whenever Marvin was in trouble was heard to say in Yiddish: "I expected it. He's Aaron's son. The apple doesn't fall far from the tree". Morris Elkind founded a successful clothing store, Elk's, which allowed the Elkind family to rise up to the middle class. As a child, Marvin Elkind suffered from dyslexia and ADHD, which caused him to placed "in care" in foster homes in the Toronto area from the age of nine onward. Morris Elkind was convinced that his stepson was a "bad seed" and on 19 March 1943 Elkind was expelled from his home, never to return, as he was placed "in care" of the Children's Aid Society.

== Criminal career ==
Elkind came to associate with the criminal elements that he met while "in care" and served as a petty crook for organized crime figures in Toronto and elsewhere. The home that Elkind was sent to was the house of a bootlegger, Lena Pasquale, who ran her bootlegging operations with the mother of future gangster Paul "The Fox" Volpe. At the time, bars and liquor stores in Ontario were required to close early, making bootlegging profitable despite the fact it had been legal to sell alcohol in Ontario since 1927. Elkind recalled that the best day for bootlegging was Sunday when it was illegal to sell alcohol. Lena Pasquale did not care for Elkind, and merely took him in for the extra money she was paid by the Children's Aid Society. All five of Mrs. Pasquale's teenage sons were criminals. John "Johnny Pops" Papalia was a frequent visitor to the Pasquale household, and he and Roy Pasquale (one of the five Pasquale brothers) were committing bank robberies together. His stepmother renamed Elkind Mario Pasquale and sent him to be educated at the St. Alphonsus Roman Catholic school to be brought up as a Catholic. She also engaged in sexual abuse of her charge, stripping both herself and him naked and spanking him under the grounds he was a "naughty boy" until he bled. Elkind recalled break-ins of grocery stores with the Pasquale brothers: "We would go the three of us, they'd break open a window in the back, a basement window, I was 11, I was a small kid, they would push me through and I would come upstairs and open the door and let them in. There was no such thing as safety deposit boxes in those days, the money was always in the store. If they got fifty dollars they would take most of it, and they would give me five dollars, which in those days was like a million, it was a lot of money. I used to keep the money in one dollar bills so it would look like a big roll."

Elkind was first arrested by Detective Eddie "the Chinaman" Tong (who despite his nickname was a British immigrant to Canada) of the Toronto Police Service on charges of theft as Tong knew that Elkind was working for the Pasquale brothers. Tong released him after his arrest out of the hope that he would lead him back to the brothers Pasquale. Tong was a local legend in Toronto as an incorruptible policeman who had walked the beat since 1929 and who stood out on the account of his fedora and trench coat which made him seem like a character out of a Hollywood film. Tong arrested the Pasquale brothers along with Elkind and several others breaking into a grocery store. Justice Harold Waisberg convicted Elkind of theft and sentenced him to serve his sentence at the Bowmanville reform school until the age of 16. During his sentence at Bowmanville school, which began in May 1945, Elkind took up boxing as his principal hobby. Discipline was enforced at Bowmanville via fearsome floggings and Elkind was flogged 175 times. He was raped with a baton by a guard, which caused him to suffer from anal bleeding problems for the rest of his life. Upon his release in 1950, Elkind resumed his criminal career working for Roy Pasquale. In 1950, he also started to work as a professional boxer, winning his first fight at the Palace Pier via knockout. Elkind was to suffer brain damage later in life because of his career in boxing. In March 1952, he moved to New York City to continue his boxing career. He took a fierce pride in his Jewish heritage as he resented the attempt to impose an Italian Catholic identity on him, and as a boxer he always carried a towel with the Star of David on it. Elkind was an unsuccessful boxer, but he obtained a job as a busboy at the Copacabana nightclub where the most famous musical and comedy acts in America such as Frank Sinatra, Dean Martin and Jerry Lewis, Sammy Davis Jr. and Harry Belafonte played. The Copacabana nightclub was frequented by gangsters such as Frankie Carbo and Anthony "Fat Tony" Salerno. In 2008, Elkind recalled: "These guys would come in the Copacabana… Tony Salerno and Frankie Carbo, and these guys were very scary and they yelled at everybody and everybody was scared to serve them, but they were big tippers. One day, I'll never forget it, Salerno calls me over to the table and he says, 'Friday is your last day here.' I said, 'Why, what did I do?' He says, 'It’s nothing about that. As of Monday you're Jimmy Hoffa's driver,' and I said, 'But I don't want to be Jimmy Hoffa's driver,' and he says, 'Nobody is asking you.'".

Starting in 1952, Elkind worked as a chauffeur for the notoriously corrupt Teamsters union boss Jimmy Hoffa for four years. Elkind was assigned by Salerno to work as Hoffa's chauffeur on the grounds that as a Canadian he would not drafted as Hoffa's previous chauffeur had been. Elkind stated in 2008: "Mr. Hoffa was a tremendously intimidating man. This man had no fear at all, of nothing, showed very little emotion, had completely no sense of humour, and was dedicated to the people that belonged to his union. When you drive these people you learn a lot and I’ll tell you why. They don’t know you’re there. You become a piece of the car, just like an extra gear shift or a brake, and they talk." In 1954, Elkind went to Miami to take part in a boxing match and was told by Hoffa that he would be met by someone powerful in Florida who wanted to talk to him. The powerful person turned out to be the gangster Meyer Lanksy who bribed him to lose the boxing match against his opponent as Elkind was favored to win the fight, and Lanksy stood to win a great deal of money in gambling by betting against him. Speaking to Elkind in Yiddish, Lansky asked him: "Who do you think owns this city?" After Elkind put on a great show of unable to get up after being punched in the third round, Lansky complimented Elkind after the bout by saying he would make a great actor. In 1956, Elkind was told by his employers that Hoffa no longer needed his services and he was going to Montreal to serve Vincenzo "Vic" Cotroni, whom "the Commission" (the governing board of the American Mafia) had appointed to be the Montreal boss. Roy Pasquale told Elkind that being the chauffeur for Cotroni was not a demotion as Cotroni was "the best" of the three Cotroni brothers and that Cotroni was just as important to "the Commission" as Hoffa was. Montreal was the North American terminus point for the French Connection heroin smuggling pipeline that ran from the "Golden Crescent" nations of Afghanistan, Pakistan and Iran via Turkey and France to North America. In the 1950s, 80% of the "French Connection" heroin arrived in Montreal before going south to New York, making Cotroni as the boss of a decina (arm) of the Bonanno family of New York, into a key figure in the underworld.

Upon his return to Canada in 1956, Elkind went to Montreal where he served as the chauffeur and bodyguard to Vic Cotroni. Elkind described Cotroni as extremely well connected as he drove him to meet numerous politicians, businessmen, union leaders, and policemen. Elkind also worked as a chauffeur and bodyguard to William "Willie Obie" Obront who he sold tainted meat for Cotroni. Elkind stated that both Cotroni and Obront had absolutely no concern that people were getting sick and sometimes dying from the tainted meat that Obront sold. He later returned to Toronto where worked for Tommy Corrigan, an Irish-American gangster whom Hoffa had appointed president of the Teamsters Toronto local 847. Corrigan became a permanent resident, but never took Canadian citizenship apparently because as an Irish-American he did not want to take an oath to Queen Elizabeth II. Elkind described Corrigan as unlike other American union bosses who were usually New Deal Democrats as Corrigan was a Republican who supported Joseph McCarthy. Elkind stated that Corrigan was a much more corrupt union boss than Hoffa as Hoffa at least tried to win better wages, pensions and working conditions for American truck drivers while Corrigan took bribes from the management to keep the wages and pensions of Canadian truck drivers low. Elkind stated: "The big difference between Jimmy Hoffa and Tommy Corrigan is that money was not that important to Mr. Hoffa. He loved the power—the power of running the union—and he wanted to say he made lives better for his people. Corrigan just wanted to be rich and didn't care who he screwed doing it. He looked out for himself an awful lot". Elkind swiftly learned that angering Corrigan could be deadly. Corrigan was the silent partner in a garbage company owned by Sam Salla and Murray Wortsman. When Corrigan learned his partners were cheating him, Salla was promptly murdered via poisoning while Wortsman fled Toronto. On 19 February 1958, Elkind married 19-year old Hannah "Hennie" Geist at a lavish wedding at the Beth Sholom synagogue in Toronto. To pay for the wedding, Elkind used money stolen from the Teamsters pension fund. In 1960 and 1961, Hannah Elkind gave birth to two daughters.

In 1958, Elkind joined the Papalia family. Elkind started working as a bouncer in the Arabian Village bar on College Street alongside the boxer Howard "Baldy" Chard, which served as an illegal gambling house for Johnny Papalia. Elkind and Papalia disliked each other, but Elkind had known Papalia since 1943, which made him someone whom Papalia could more or less trust. The Arabian Village bar served as a place to entrap members of Ontario's elite. The most important persons entrapped were Smirle Lawson, the chief coroner of Ontario and the MP Lionel Conacher, both of whom were friends of Justice Walter T. Robb, the chairman of the Ontario Liquor Licensing Board. Elkind recalled: "In those days, getting a liquor license was like printing money. Very few places had them. They were difficult to get and you had to get to Judge Robb. You just couldn't go to Judge Robb yourself and pay him off. You had to go through somebody. Smirle Lawson was one of his contacts. Charlie Conacher was one of his contracts. So if you wanted a liquor license in a bar or something, you would get to Judge Robb through these certain guys".

Elkind also worked as a chauffeur for the boxer Muhammad Ali when he boxed in Toronto. Elkind first met Ali in 1965 when he went to New York with George Chuvalo to watch him fight Floyd Patterson. Elkind was a long-standing friend of the Canadian boxing champion Chuvalo. On 2 February 1965, in a hard-fought boxing match at Madison Square Garden, Ali beat Chauvalo by decision of the judges. During his trip to New York, Elkind used his Teamsters connections acquired from working for Hoffa to get Ali a room in a prestigious hotel, and as thanks Ali promised that Elkind would work as his chauffeur whenever he visited Toronto. During a rematch between Chuvalo and Ali in Toronto at the Maple Leaf Gardens in 1966, Ali stayed at the Lord Simcoe Hotel and Elkind served as his chauffeur. Elkind said of Ali in 2011: "He's a great human being, great fighter, great person. I really like him". As Ali became one of the most famous and controversial men in the world in the 1960s, Elkind came to enjoy a certain power in Canada as the only Canadian capable of arranging for Ali to speak at social events.

Elkind opened a clothing store, The Coach Room, that competed with Elk's, the menswear clothing store owned by his uncle and stepfather. The Coach Room was a front for money laundering for the Atlantic Acceptance Corporation ran by C. Powell Morgan, which in turn was a Ponzi scheme. In the early 1960s, Elkind had a respectable image as the owner of The Coach Room store and a senior Teamsters official, a married man with two daughters who gave generously to charity and to Zionist groups. He was often mentioned in the Toronto Star's "Social Whirl" column, which detailed the parties of Toronto's elite. On 14 June 1965, the Atlantic Acceptance company defaulted on a cheque for $5 million, which led to the largest corporate bankruptcy in Canadian history until that point. Elkind was arrested on charges of fraud and money laundering while Morgan died. The chief accountant of Atlantic Acceptance fled to Vancouver, where he was arrested; on his return flight to Toronto, the airplane carrying him was destroyed by a bomb. Elkind said of The Coach Room: "It was one hundred percent a scam. It was a front. All of the money from sales at the store went to Morgan's company, and the sales were listed as financing, and each bill was written up in the books as a receivable that was non-collectible". In the royal commission that examined the failure of Atlantic Acceptance, Elkind appeared as a witness. The scandal along his testimony at the royal commission ruined Elkind's respectable image in Toronto, and instead gave a disreputable image as someone whose dishonesty had involved him in the biggest bankruptcy in Canadian history.

In December 1969, Elkind in a plea bargain with the Crown pledged guilty to the fraud and money laundering charges related to the failure of Atlantic Acceptance, and was sentenced to one year in prison. He started serving his sentence at the Mimico Correctional Centre on 18 December 1969. While serving his sentence, he became friends with Harold Ballard, the owner of the Toronto Maple Leafs hockey team who had been convicted of fraud and income tax evasion. After his release on parole on 18 April 1970, Elkind went to work for Giacomo Luppino, the Mafia boss of Hamilton. Luppino often sent Elkind to Montreal to deliver cash to his son-in-law, Paolo Violi, the underboss of the Cotroni family. Elkind described Violi as a cruel man who he saw smash up the shop of an Italian immigrant who was late in paying extortion money; even after the store owner paid the money, which he said were the last of his savings, Violi continued to smash up his shop with his baseball bat just because it amused him to watch the man cry as his business was being destroyed. In 1970, Elkind had his last boxing match in Vancouver, where he was paid $3, 000 by the mining tycoon Murray Pezim for the fight. Fearing he was getting too old for boxing, Elkind asked for advice from his friend, Jake LaMotta, about how to beat a much younger man. Elkind followed LaMotta's advice to follow the rope-a-dope trick of pretending to be on the verge of a knockout, which caused his opponent to lower his fists, and allowed Elkind to knock him out.

Besides for being a gangster, Elkind was involved with the Toronto chapter of the Jewish Defense League (JDL), and in this way he served as the chauffeur for the former Israeli Prime Minister Golda Meir when she visited Toronto on 17 December 1974. Through his work for the JDL, Elkind came to know David Satok, a Toronto businessman and a prominent Zionist who asked him to serve as the chauffeur for Meir. The visit of Meir to Toronto attracted protests from pro-Palestinian elements, and Elkind discovered that driving Meir around Toronto was difficult. As Prime Minister of Israel, Meir had a fierce "warrior queen" image, but Elkind described Meir as having a grandmotherly persona, saying she was not as aggressive as her image suggested.

Along with the gangster Howard Chard, Elkind worked in the 1970s as collector of underworld debts, usually for loan sharks. Elkind said of his work: "We didn't usually bother much with straight people because we didn't want to deal with people that would call the cops. We liked people who were scared to get the police involved, people who are shady to begin or have other problems besides us". In 1980, Elkind came to know a "stock hustler", Neil Proverbs, who specialized in swindling investors into his dubious "get-rich-quick" schemes. Facing charges of fraud in connection with a $80,000 swindle, Proverbs gave Elkind $5,000 to bribe the police into dropping the fraud charges. Elkind set up a meeting between Proverbs and Sergeant George Reynolds and Sergeant William Bullied of the Toronto police who were in charge of the Proverbs case. Starting on 22 October 1981, Proverbs started to secretly video tape his dinners with Reynolds and Bullied. On 5 May 1982, the Proverbs video tapes were leaked to the Toronto Star, which ran a frontpage story. Fearing he would be arrested, Elkind fled to Calgary. In November 1982, Elkind was arrested in Calgary in connection with his "tin men" scam where he overcharged homeowners for shoddy aluminum sliding. After his arrest, Elkind agreed to turn Crown's evidence as the police wanted him to testify against Proverbs, whose case had become a major scandal in Toronto. At the trial, Elkind served as a comical witness for the Crown whose one-liners constantly caused the courtroom to break into laughter. Elkind testified that he tried to bribe Bullied and Reynolds, but none of the detectives were willing to accept his bribes, which fitted in with the narrative about the Proverbs case that the Crown wanted to promote. Afterwards, Elkind told a journalist from the Toronto Star, John Kessel, that he committed perjury on the stand in exchange for having the fraud charges against him being dropped. Only the fact that Kessel had failed to tape his talk with Elkind along with a rebuttal story from the police that Elkind was a well known con-man willing to tell any lie prevented the story from being published in the Toronto Star.

== Informer ==
Feeling that he was being disrespected by the crime bosses he served as he never received a promotion, in 1983 Elkind went to work as an informer for the Ontario Provincial Police (OPP). Elkind's handler for the next ten years was Al Robinson. Robinson often joined Elkind in his undercover work, using as his alias "Colonel Gibson". Robinson had served in the Royal Canadian Air Force before joining the OPP, and created the persona of "Colonel Gibson", a slightly deranged former Air Force officer who been given a dishonorable discharge and was now working as an arms dealer.

As Agent 0030, Elkind became the most successful informer in Canadian history. Elkind was highly unusual in that he worked as an informer for ten years without being exposed. The journalist Adrien Humphreys wrote: "Marvin helped cops corral cartel members in Mexico, Libyan terrorists, drug traffickers in New York, mobsters in Detroit, coup plotters in Ghana, stock swindlers in Amsterdam, corrupt politicians, outlaw bikers, killers, sexual predators and a full inventory of criminals in cities across Canada." One officer of the Royal Canadian Mounted Police (RCMP), Andy Rayne, who worked with Elkind on several cases in the 1980s and early 1990s, said of him: "Marvin wasn't a hardened criminal. He was just associated with hardened criminals. He wasn't one of the bad guys. We could trust him. He wasn't like other informants we worked with. We trusted him and he was part of the team. The golden rule, they always tell us, is don't befriend an informant. Well, I'm sorry, we kind of all became friends with Marvin. Most of us, anyway". From 1983 to 1986, Chuvalo hosted a documentary television show along with Charles "Spider" Jones called Famous Knockouts about famous boxing fights. Elkind often appeared on Famous Knockouts as a comic sidekick to Chuvalo where he was given the nickname of "The Weasel".

Elkind showed the police where Santo Scibetta, a gangster from Buffalo, was hiding in Hamilton as evidence that he had access to high level figures in the underworld. In his first case for the police, Elkind exposed a scam by real estate salesmen, Herbert Asselstine and George Buric, to cash phoney certified cheques from a bank in St. Kitts. Asselstine and Buric had two fake certified cheques from the Bank of Commerce of St. Kitts totaling $1.7 million. Elkind introduced Asselstine and Buric to undercover police officers who collected sufficient evidence to charge both of them with fraud. Via Asselstine and Buric, Elkind met a woman from New York known as "Anna" who told him she could supply him with any pornography he wanted, telling him in a Toronto bagel shop: "I can get you pornography like you've never seen here. I can get you as much as you want—a thousand tapes, two thousand, three thousand. The best. Hard as you want—kiddie porn, S & M, gay, animals, snuff, you name it". Robinson was interested in what Elkind had told him, and assigned Constable William Gill of the OPP to go undercover with him to end the smuggling of depraved pornography with children into Canada. Joining Gill and Elkind was Andy Rayne of the RCMP, a man of British descent who had a dark, swarthy look which allowed him to play other people of other ethnic backgrounds such as Italians, Greeks and Arabs. Elkind introduced Rayne to Anna as Andy Lenew, who told her that he was willing to spend a million dollars to import VCR tapes of child pornography into Canada. Rayne posed as an entrepreneur who wished to become Canada's biggest pornography dealer.

As Elkind and Rayne went to New York to meet the source behind the VCR tapes, the Federal Bureau of Investigation (FBI) took charge of the New York end of the sting operation. On 11 April 1983, in New York, Anna played to Elkind and Rayne a series of VCR tapes that featured depraved scenes of children in rape and torture. Both Rayne and Elkind described watching the children pornography VHS tapes as deeply nauseating, made worse by the fact that they had to pretend to enjoy watching the tapes. Anna revealed to Rayne and Elkind that the source behind the VCR tapes was Marty Hodas, a pornography tycoon based in New York. In June 1983, Elkind and Rayne finally met Hodas, who offered to sell the depraved VCR tapes of child pornography for $2 million. Hodas promised to make Rayne "the king of pornography in Canada". Rayne paid Hodas $50,000 for the first shipment of the VCR tapes to Toronto while being recorded by FBI cameras and bugs. Hodas flew to Toronto to meet Rayne at the CN Tower to discuss more details of the deal. The five-month FBI–RCMP joint investigation, known as Operation Blizzard, concluded in July 1983 when a shipment of depraved content being shipped from New York to Toronto was intercepted in Buffalo and the smugglers were arrested. The case ended with the convictions of Hodas and two associates, Richard John Spadafora and Sheila Baumel, on charges of smuggling obscene material for shipping 1,200 VHS tapes worth $50,000 U.S. dollars of child pornography to Toronto. Hodas, Spadafora and Baumel each pleaded guilty in federal court in Buffalo on 5 December 1984. Eve Bloom, the woman allegedly known as "Anna", became a fugitive.

In 1983 and 1984, Elkind went undercover with the Hamiltion Mafia boss Johnny Papalia to expose his mortgage scams. In 2011, Elkind told Humphreys about Papalia: "I hated that son of a bitch. He was evil to an extreme." He learned from a fellow criminal, Howard Halpenny, of Papalia's plans to take over much of downtown Hamilton via fraud, and Elkind had involved himself in the plot by telling Halpenny to inform Papalia that he knew a dishonest real estate broker. On 20 July 1983, Elkind met Papalia at his office in Galaxy Vending on Railroad Street. Elkind told Papalia while wearing a wire: "Check it out, see this guy gets mortgages most people can", leading to Papalia to say: "Go to work. Set it up". Elkind learned that Papalia planned via dishonest means to buy up via fraud much of downtown Hamilton in order to build a 100-room hotel that would cover 82,000 square feet. Papalia tended to be cagey with his words in his meetings with Elkind as he preferred to make cryptic statements and hand gestures to express his plans. At one point, Elkind thought he was going to be exposed as Papalia reached for what appeared to be his belt, in which he had hidden the wire, but instead was reaching for a piece of paper. By October 1983, the information from Elkind had caused regulators to inquire into why Papalia had taken out an $11.7 million mortgage on properties worth only $2 million. Elkind never recorded Papalia as saying anything that could be used to indict him for a scam to defraud investors of millions as Papalia planned to sell buildings in Hamilton that he did not own, but he did collect enough evidence to put a stop to Papalia's scheme.

In 1984, Elkind's status as a Teamsters official led him to be approached by Hector Massey, a political science professor at York University and a prominent organizer for the Liberal Party in Toronto's Jamaican-Canadian community. On 16 April 1984 at his house in Schomberg, Massey told Elkind he could arrange for the Teamsters union truck drivers to be the sole drivers at construction sites for the federal government in exchange for a kickback. Massey went on to say that he had many friends in Ottawa, most notably Jean Chrétien, the Energy Minister and one of the closest allies of the Prime Minister Pierre Trudeau, and he could arrange for the federal government to do any construction project he wanted. Robinson ordered Elkind to wear a wire at his meetings with Massey, saying this was a major case of corruption. Elkind joined the Liberal Party and attended the convention on 13 June 1984 where Chrétien was defeated by John Turner to be the next Liberal leader. During the convention, Elkind served as a bodyguard for Chrétien, whom he described as a "great guy". The investigation was stopped upon the orders of Robinson's superiors, who stated that they did not want the OPP charging federal officials with corruption on the eve of a general election.

Between 1984 and 1986, Elkind stopped the schemes of a Libyan terrorist, Muftah El-Abbar, living in Toronto to commit terrorist attacks in Canada and the United States. In 1984, Robinson told Elkind that there was a Libyan intelligence agent, El-Abbar, living in a Toronto penthouse whose terrorist activities he wanted him to expose as he stated El-Abbar had brushed off several undercover agents before. On 9 August 1984, Elkind met El-Abbar by posing as a businessman who wanted a loan to sell drywall to the construction industry. Elkind served to introduce an undercover U.S. Treasury Department agent to El-Abbar whom he stated was his American business partner. After the Treasury agent was introduced to El-Abbar, Elkind's role in the case largely ceased. The OPP file on the case read: "This individual [El-Abbar] was subsequently arrested by U.S. authorities for obtaining a U.S. passport by using counterfeit birth documents". In 2011, Elkind said of the El-Abbar case: "That’s the one thing I am most proud of".

Elkind served as one of the emotional supports for Chuvalo after his heroin-addicted son Jesse committed suicide in 1985. Two of Chuvalo's other sons were also heroin addicts and both died of heroin overdoses with George Jr. being found dead in a shady Toronto hotel in 1993 and Steven Chuvalo dying of a heroin overdose on the streets in 1996. Chuvalo set himself up as an anti-drug crusader who spoke to high school students about the problems of substance abuse. Elkind had the task of persuading high school principals to allow Chuvalo to speak to students.

In June and July 1986, Elkind's status as a Teamster official allowed him to be involved in a drug-smuggling ring bringing cocaine from the Detroit into Toronto, where Robinson joined him using his Colonel Gibson alter ego. Along with FBI Special Agent Rich Mazzari, Elkind and Robinson learned of a drug smuggling pipeline ran by an Indo-American financer, Kirpal Ahuwalia, that ran from Los Angeles to Toronto with the drugs to be distributed by the Para-Dice Riders biker gang. During a drug buy in Detroit, an inexperienced FBI agent answered the phone by saying "FBI Detroit", which exposed the covers of Elkind and Robinson who were forced to flee from a bar. On 22 March 1987, two gangsters showed up at Elkind's house with the intention of killing him, leading Elkind to put his boxing skills to good use while his wife phoned the police. The case ended in June 1987 with the arrests of the owner of the Million Dollar Saloon in Mississauga, which had been used for drug smuggling, along with the two men who had tried to kill Elkind.

In 1986, Corrigan and Elkind went on a trip to New York to meet various Mafia figures while the latter kept the FBI well informed. After their return to Toronto, Corrigan told Elkind that Carmine "The Snake" Persico, the boss of the Colombo family, would be arriving in Toronto to hide out as he been indicted for being a member of "the Commission". Elkind informed the FBI of Persico's plans to flee to Canada, which were aborted. In 1987, Corrigan sent Elkind to Atlantic City, where he planned to invest in real estate. During his trip to Atlantic City, Elkind reported to Special Agent Rich Mazzari of the FBI. In Atlantic City, Elkind met three Mafiosi who represented Nicodemo "Little Nicky" Scarfo, the Mafia boss of Philadelphia, who was looking to take over a casino. Atlantic City was assigned by "the Commission" to the territory of the Bruno family of Philadelphia. Elkind told the three Mafisoi that he not only represented Corrigan, who was willing to steal from the Teamsters pension plan to make a loan to Scarfo, but also Irving Kott, a disreputable Montreal financer. Elkind introduced Mazzari as a fellow gangster from Toronto who wanted to join the casino scheme. Mazzari put a stop to the plans of Scarfo moving into the casino business. Afterwards, Elkind learned that John Gotti, the boss of the Gambino family, wanted to see him, but Corrigan forbade a meeting under the grounds that Gotti was too infamous and the FBI would learn about their plans to take over a casino.

Elkind exposed another of Corrigan's scams, namely the so-called International Bank of St. Kitts, based in Basseterre. With the help of the corrupt government of St. Kitts, a group of equally corrupt Canadian and American financers and lawyers set up a pseudo-bank in St. Kitts that was owned by Corrigan. In fact, the International Bank of St. Kitts was a boiler room operation that sold stocks in the non-existent International Bank of St. Kitts to investors in Great Britain. The major figures in the International Bank besides Corrigan were Marty Resnick; Irving Kott; Lyon Wexler; Leonard Rosenberg; and Howard Eaton. Resnick was a veteran boiler room operator had been convicted seven times of theft; six times for fraud; and once for attempting to bribe a policeman. Rosenberg was a Toronto financer who had been convicted of fraud in a real estate flip in 1983 where he had stolen $131 million from investors who served as one of the bank's key officers. Kott was the former stock broker to Vic Cotroni. Kott had been convicted of fraud in 1976, for which he paid a $500,000 fine and again in 1979, for which he served four years in prison. After his release from prison in 1983, Kott went on to make $400 million U.S. dollars via a boiler room operation in Amsterdam, selling shares in a bogus company which claimed to have invented a machine that could suck gold particles out of water. One of the bank's officers, Howard Eaton, was a disgraced financer from California who been involved in the largest bank failure in Canadian history, the Canadian Commercial Bank, which was shut down by regulators for its involvement in Rosenberg's real estate scam. Another of the bank's officers was Lyon Wexler. Wexler was a disbarred Hamilton lawyer who had been fined $4,000 for stealing from his clients and had been involved in Rosenberg's real estate scam. Shares in the International Bank were sold via a cell centre in London that used high-pressure sales tactics against ordinary people who would not have noticed the many dubious aspects of the International Bank, such as the lack of any known assets and that the shareholders were described as figures in impressive-sounding institutions whose full addresses were not given. Several ministers in the cabinet of the St. Christopher and Nevis government along with their friends and family members were involved in International Bank, which led for the government of St. Kitts and Nevis to be stoutly uncooperative with requests from the United States, the United Kingdom and Canada for information about the bank. The complicated international nature of the scam involving figures in the United Kingdom, Canada, the United States and St. Kitts made it difficult to lay charges, so Robinson once he was alerted to the scam by Elkind, did the next best thing and contacted the journalist Peter Moon. Moon ran an expose of the St. Kitts boiler room operation that appeared as the front-page story in The Globe & Mail on 26 January 1987. Resnick told Moon during an alcohol-soaked interview besides a pool in a hotel in St. Kitts about the International Bank operation that was printed in the story: "We'll meet again in Hong Kong, maybe Macao, Rio de Janeiro or even Australia, in the same circumstances. And you'll be doing your job and I'll be doing mine". Moon's story caused a scandal and led to the government of St. Kitts finally shutting down the International Bank.

On 14 September 1987, Elkind met a Toronto businessman, Nicholas Andreko, at the Wheat Sheaf Tavern who told him he was going to finance a coup to topple Flight Lieutenant Jerry Rawlings, the president of Ghana, and was looking to meet some arms dealers. Elkind arranged for Andreko to meet Robinson who donned his usual alter-ego of "Colonel Gibson". Another OPP officer, Constable John Celentino, was brought in to portray another arms dealer named "Gino". On 5 November 1987, at a posh hotel in Toronto, Elkind introduced Andreko to "Colonel Gibson" and "Gino", who presented themselves as shady arms dealers who were willing to sell him a stockpile of AK-47 assault rifles plus ammunition. As the guns were going to be smuggled into Côte d'Ivoire via the United States, the FBI was brought into the case. On 9 January 1988, in a hotel in Detroit, Elkind introduced Andreko and Sam O'Dame of the Ghana Democratic Movement to Robinson and Celentino. Andreko and O'Dame talked quite openly about their plans to assassinate Rawlings as part of their plans for a coup. On 28 February 1988, Elkind met another conspirator, Dr. Edward Mahama, who represented the leader of the plot, a former finance minister in Rawlings's government who was living in exile after a failed coup attempt in 1981. In May 1988, Elkind met with the plotters, where it was revealed that Andreko was expecting control of Ghana's rich gold mines as his reward for his part in financing the coup. Andreko revealed himself to be a member of a consortium of wealthy businessmen who wanted control of the economy of Ghana as it was noted that Ghana was a leading gold producer, the world's second-largest producer of cacao, and was rich in oil, timber and diamonds. As Ghana was a fellow member of the Commonwealth, the coup plot, which was based partly in Toronto, was especially concerning to Joe Clark, the External Affairs Minister, who was briefed by Robinson personally on the case. The government of Canada informed the government of Ghana about the plot in September 1988, which put an end to the planned coup.

On 3 May 1988, in a road rage incident, Elkind attacked a man whom had crashed his car into his. Elkind pleaded guilty to assault causing bodily harm, but the Justice John Gilbert stated that as a former boxer Elkind would have to do prison time. Elkind was sentenced to 90 days in prison at the Mimico institution. While at Mimico, Elkind learned from another prisoner, Joseph Pilgrim, that he sold the gun that had been used to kill Constable Douglas Tribbing of the York Regional Police, who had been killed during a robbery of a computer store in Markham in 1984. On the basis of the information learned from Pilgrim, Elkind told Robinson that the killer of Tribbling was a career criminal, Ronald York, whose girlfriend was Pilgrim's sister. York was convicted of first degree murder in 1993 in connection with Tribbling's death.

In February 1989, Elkind served as a loan shark to a relative of a friend of his nephew, known as "Philip" due to a court order, providing him with a loan with 240% interest. In turn, Elkind got the money for the loan from the Commisso 'ndrina. Elkind went to the Casa Commisso Banquet Hall on Lawrence Avenue to meet Rocco Remo Commisso, one of the three Commisso brothers, who gave him an envelope with $10,000 in cash in it in exchange for a cut of the profits from the loan sharking. As "Philip" could not manage the 240% interest, he ceased paying the loan, leading to the Commisso brothers to warn Elkind that his life depended upon ensuring that "Philip" kept repaying the loan. In the meantime, concern was expressed about Elkind's mental stability by Robinson who arranged for him to see a psychiatrist. As Elkind started to speak about his life as a criminal and informer, the psychiatrist became convinced that Elkind was mentally ill and ordered him out of his office, saying he was delusional. In the summer of 1989, Elkind's daughter brought home her boyfriend whom she introduced to her parents. Elkind recognized the young man as a local thug, and told his daughter to break up with him, saying that he knew this young man very well and he was worthless as a human being. His daughter was furious about her father calling her boyfriend a criminal, but she realized he was telling the truth when she saw her boyfriend throw Molotov cocktails at a house as part of an extortion bid. As for his other daughter, Elkind approved of her boyfriend, but grew annoyed when he refused to propose marriage as he preferred his common-law relationship. Chuvalo stepped in to assist Elkind at a boxing match by putting the young man into a headlock and saying: "We are going to the synagogue, either for a funeral or a wedding. Your choice!" Chuvalo's tactics had the desired effect and the young couple went to the synagogue to get married. To pay for the wedding, Elkind raised $20,000 by assisting a corrupt Montreal financer Kott win control of a waste disposal company in Toronto by outbidding his equally corrupt union boss Corrigan. Elkind provided the "insider's information" which allowed Kott to outbid Corrigan, and made the $20,000, which he used to pay for a lavish traditional Jewish wedding along with a reception at Sutton Place Hotel, the most luxurious hotel in Toronto.

On 26 October 1989, Elkind threatened to kill "Philip" at a Toronto restaurant, leading for him to be promptly arrested at the restaurant as "Philip" had turned Crown's evidence and was wearing a wire. As an informer, Elkind was supposed to keep Robinson briefed on all his criminal activities, and Robinson was furious with Elkind for not telling him that he was engaged in loan-sharking on behalf of the Commisso brothers. Elkind had expected Robinson to protect him and was surprised when Robinson told him: "You were involved in a crime without telling me. You didn't tell me about this deal. You never said you were meeting the Commissos". After his release on bail, Elkind went to the Casa Comisso Banquet Hall to tell the Commisso brothers that it would not be possible for him to collect on the loan. Elkind recalled: "They were very good about it, they understood. I told them I would pay it all back to them and Remo Commisso said I just needed to pay the principle, the ten grand, and to forget about the juice, the interest. They didn't come down hard on me at all". Elkind's arrest for making death threats, extortion, and loan sharking was reported in the Toronto newspapers, which served to protect him against charges of being an informer for several years afterward. Elkind decided that the friend of his nephew who had introduced him to "Philip" should provide the $10,000 to repay the Commisso brothers, whom he found by posing as a rabbi who wanted to hold a dinner in honor of successful young Jewish men, and called his mother, who provided him with his address and phone number. Elkind then called up the young man to tell him that he was going to provide $10,000 to repay the Commisso brothers, saying: "You give me the money or I'll have the bikers there to take care of you. Don't fuck with me!" The young man provided Elkind with $10,000 the next day, which Elkind then handed over to the Commisso brothers. As for the charges, Elkind ended up pleading guilty to extortion in exchange for a reduced prison sentence.

In 1990, Elkind went undercover in Detroit along with Rayne posing as gangsters wishing to buy black market arms to sell in Toronto. After visiting a disco looking for gun-runners willing to sell them handguns, the disco was bombed. The next day, Elkind and Rayne received a phone call from FBI Special Agent Rich Mazzari to tell them that their act had worked too well, and the Detroit police were convinced that the Canadian duo were the ones who bombed the disco. Mazzari, who was in charge of FBI operations in Detroit, often borrowed Elkind from the OPP for his operations. While working for the FBI in 1990, Elkind visited an Italian bakery in Detroit suspected of selling heroin by posing as a drug dealer from Toronto who wanted to buy heroin. The baker proved quite willing to sell Elkind heroin and stated that his source was three Detroit policemen along with a real estate agent across the border in Windsor. The information provided by Elkind led to the arrests of the three corrupt policemen.

=== The "Peanut Butter Murder plot" ===
Starting with the Gulf War of 1991, Elkind worked as a security guard at his synagogue in Toronto as the Gulf War caused an upsurge of antisemitism in Canada, and the former boxer Elkind volunteered to serve as a security guard during the Saturday prayers at the Beth David B'nai Israel Beth Am temple. Elkind did not testify for the Crown at trials as the Crown Attorneys would call upon the undercover police officers Elkind had introduced to the accused as witnesses. On 7 November 1991, in the case of Regina vs. Stinchombe, the Supreme Court of Canada ruled that the identity of informers could not be kept secret anymore and the Crown would have to make informers testify at trials. In 1991, Elkind was the co-owner of the Laurel Leaf Bakery in Mississauga and became involved in a plot by two of the other co-owners, Stanley Grossman and Corrigan, to defraud the fourth co-owner, Sydney Rosen, who had in turn defrauded Grossman of some of his shares in the company. On 22 November 1991, Elkind, while wearing a wire, recorded Grossman telling him to hire some thugs to beat up Rosen and to kidnap his children to force Rosen to put $500,000 into a Hong Kong bank. On 17 January 1992, Elkind introduced to Grossman Constable John Celentino as a supposed American thug from Detroit who he had hired to beat up Rosen. After Rosen was arrested, Elkind remained active in other cases. In February 1992, at a meeting with Corrigan at the Laurel Leaf Bakery, Elkind was nearly exposed as an informer when one of his thugs jokingly said Elkind could be an informer and grabbed his chest where he felt the wire that Elkind was wearing under his shirt. Elkind screamed in mock pain and ran away. The next day, Elkind put on medical back-support straps and went to explain the incident to Corrigan by saying he was wearing braces because of a back-injury and that was what was felt under his shirt. In the spring of 1992, Elkind met with Carmen Barillaro, the underboss of the Papalia family, to discuss his plans to sell counterfeit passports. The evidence collected by Elkind led to Barillaro being charged with drug smuggling in May 1992. At the trial of Rosen in 1993, his lawyer Joseph Bloomenfeld cited the R vs. Stinchombe decision and demanded that the Crown's anonymous informer be compelled to testify. Elkind was forced to testify at the trial, which ended with Grossman being convicted as well as his wife divorcing him after an audio tape of him boasting about receiving fellatio from a prostitute was played in court. However, the Rosen case exposed Elkind as an informer.

After being exposed as an informer in 1993, Elkind ceased his undercover work. Robinson (who had been retired since 1990 at this point) warned both Barillaro and the Commisso brothers not to kill Elkind. On 5 April 1993, Robinson met Barilaro to warn him that he would run him down if Elkind was killed, and the next day gave Comismo Commisso the same warning. On 13 May 1993, Elkind's service as an informer officially came to an end. The gangster Eddie Melo was so enraged when he learned Elkind was an informer that he tried to beat him up in front of the St. Lawrence Market and Elkind was only saved when Mitchell Chuvalo, the son of George Chuvalo, came to his aid. Corrigan was furious when Elkind was exposed as an informer and informed him that he was going have him killed. Elkind struck back by telling Corrigan's wife about a ménage à trois involving Corrigan, his mistress and a young woman that ended with the mistress becoming jealous and attacked the young woman. Elkind hoped that Corrigan's Italian-American wife might strike back via her Mafia associations at her unfaithful husband. Corrigan was poisoned on 6 May 2001; it remains unknown even today who had killed him. Shortly before he was exposed as an informer, Elkind had introduced an American hitman-turned-FBI informer, Ernie Kanakis, to the Commisso brothers as part of a sting operation. The possibility that the Commisso brothers might strike back at Elkind led for him to go to Los Angeles in 1993 where he was protected by the FBI as a reward for his past services to the bureau. Bored with his life in witness protection, on 7 June 1993, Elkind broke away from his FBI bodyguards to travel to Las Vegas to watch the boxing match between George Foreman vs. Tommy Morrison. As Elkind had a front row seat alongside his friend Lennox Lewis, his presence at the Foreman–Morrison fight was noticed, and as a result the FBI expelled Elkind back to Canada for violating the rules of witness protection. Elkind settled in Vancouver, but returned to Toronto in 1994 in order to be close to his daughters.

In 1998, a wealthy businessman, Jack Tully, who prayed at the synagogue where Elkind served as a security guard, approached him with an offer to hire him to kill his son-in-law. Tully was angry that his son-in-law, Martin Fisher, was not permitting him to see his daughter or his two grandchildren, and told Elkind that he would pay him a substantial sum of money if he could get Fisher drunk and to drive home, believing he would be killed in an accident. Elkind refused the offer under the grounds that Fisher might kill others while driving drunk. Tully then told Elkind that Fisher was severely allergic to peanut butter, and he would pay him a thousand dollars to kill Fisher by getting him to drink alcohol laced with peanut oil or eat food laced with peanut butter. Elkind contacted the York Regional Police about the murder plot and, while wearing a wire on 2 September 1998, recorded Tully talking about the plan to kill Fisher via peanut butter and provided him with the murder weapons, namely a bottle of peanut oil and a jar of peanut butter, which led to Tully's arrest. In January 2001, Tully went on trial in Toronto, and Elkind served as the star witness for the Crown. The bizarre nature of the murder plot made the trial into a media sensation in Toronto. As the trial progressed and it became apparent that the Crown had an overwhelming case against him, Tully made a plea bargain with the Crown where he pleaded guilty to conspiracy to commit murder in exchange for a lighter prison sentence. The murder plot served as the basis for the 2004 comedy film Zeyda and the Hitman in which Elkind was played by Danny Aiello. Elkind was a controversial figure at his synagogue, where many felt he had damaged the reputation of the Jewish community of Toronto by his criminal activities and by exposing Tully's plot to kill Fisher. Other members of the synagogue have argued that it was Tully who set the murder plot in motion, and that Elkind did more good as an informer than he did bad as a criminal.

In 2009, Elkind was called out of a retirement for his last undercover mission when he was employed in Mexico City by the FBI and the Policía Federal to contact one of the cousins of the Pasquale family he had grown up with. In December 2009, Elkind went to Mexico where he was told by the Federales not to wear a wire as it was far too dangerous. Elkind had to remember what was said during the meeting to discuss smuggling cocaine into the United States, but he was paid $2,000 for his services to Mexico.

== Retirement and death ==
In 2011, Elkind said of his criminal career: "The Mob life is living with a lot of bad guys, and you’re not sure sometimes who are your friends and who aren’t...If there was a way I could turn the clock back 68 years...I would do it completely different. Am I satisfied with the way I lived my life? One hundred per cent no'. Of his work as an informer, Elkind said: "I'll tell you what makes a good informant, and I am giving it to you straight, kid. You have to be a guy that isn't high level in any one mob, and works in several; a guy that is dissatisfied, feels he never rose as high as he should have and doesn't have strong loyalties and is embittered. And you have to have steel balls and no brains, and I got them both". The journalist James Dubro said of Elkind: "He was a charismatic speaker and interview subject with a quintessential mobster voice. I'm amazed he was never killed. He did betray many gangsters and even testified in court against them". In his last years, Elkind frequently appeared in television documentaries about organized crime where he became famed as a raconteur.

Elkind battled Parkinson's disease in his final years and died of natural causes at his home in Mississauga on 21 January 2024, at the age of 89. He was buried at the Pardes Chaim Cemetery in Vaughan.

== Books ==
- Humphreys, Adrian (2011). The Weasel: A Double Life in the Mob. Toronto: John Wiley & Sons. ISBN 978-0470964514.
