= Markam =

Markam is a surname of Indian origin.

== List of people with the surname ==
- Ambika Markam, Indian politician
- Hira Singh Markam (1942–2020), Indian politician
- Mohan Markam (born 1967), Indian politician
- Omkar Markam (born 1976), Indian politician

== See also ==
- Markam County
- Markham (disambiguation)
