= Giacomo Luppino =

Italo-Canadian crime boss (1900-1987)

- Born: 16 January 1900; Oppido Mamertina, Calabria, Italy
- Died: 18 March 1987 (aged 87); Hamilton, Ontario, Canada
- Occupation: Crime boss
- Spouse: Domenica Todaro
- Children: 10
- Allegiance: Buffalo crime family Luppino crime family

Giacomo Luppino (16 January 1900 – 18 March 1987) was an Italian-Canadian mobster who founded and led the Luppino family of Hamilton.

== Early life ==
Luppino was born in 1900 in the village of Oppido Mamertina, Calabria, Italy. Already involved in organized crime in Calabria, Luppino, his wife Domenica (née Todaro) and their 10 children immigrated to Hamilton, Ontario, in 1956, from Castellace, a subdivision of Oppido Mamertina. Luppino was the prime suspect in two murders in Italy, though he was never charged in either case. Luppino was said to carry a human ear in his wallet. The ear that Luppino was believed to always have with him is said to have been from an incident when he severed an ear from a man in public to demonstrate his power.

== Boss of Hamilton ==
By the time Luppino arrived in Canada, the "Three Dons" had already been established, consisting of Santo Scibetta, Anthony Sylvestro, and Calogero Bordonaro, who answered to Stefano Magaddino of the Buffalo crime family. Magaddino's syndicate supplied drugs to Hamilton and Guelph, which in turn supplied drugs to Toronto. Before Scibetta moved to Hamilton, he was already a member of the Magaddino family. By the early 1960s, Magaddino promoted Santo Scibetta to leader of the Buffalo family's Ontario branch, replacing Johnny Papalia, who was under indictment in the United States. Papalia always treated Luppino as a "man of respect" whose advice was to be followed.

Throughout the 1950s and 1960s, Luppino and Scibetta jointly controlled Hamilton. In the late 1950s, Paul Volpe operated a stock fraud scheme in Toronto and Hamilton with the support of Jimmy Luppino and Harold Bordonaro, the son of Calogero (Charlie) Bordonaro, until Volpe was run out of Hamilton by Papalia.

In the early 1960s, Luppino was the capodecina of the Hamilton faction of Magaddino's Buffalo crime family, giving Luppino control over all of his branches in Ontario. As boss of all bosses in the region, he was a founding member of the Camera di Controllo in Canada in 1962. Luppino had been seen meeting with powerful mob figures, including 'Ndrangheta member Rocco Zito and Siderno Group member Michele Racco. Luppino and Santo Scibetta also answered to Magaddino, while Papalia was imprisoned in Canadian and American prisons between 1962 and 1968.

In 1963, when the bootlegger Paolo Violi – a favorite of Luppino's – proved unable to get along with Johnny Papalia, Luppino arranged for him to go to Montreal, where he became the underboss of the Cotroni family. Luppino had been friends with Domencio Violi, Paolo's father, in Italy, and he regarded Paolo almost like a son. The name Cotroni family was a misnomer as in fact the Cotroni family was only a decina of the Bonanno family of New York. Violi's status as the underboss was extended as a way to ultimately add southern Quebec to southern Ontario under the control of the Maggaddino family. For his part, the Calabrian Vic Cotroni was already having difficulties with the Sicilian faction of the Cotroni family led by Lugi Greco and Nicolo Rizzuto, and he saw making his fellow Calabrian Violi underboss as a way to keep the Sicilian faction in check. In 1965, Luppino's daughter Grazia married Violi, and Luppino was very close to Violi, a man he greatly liked and admired. The wedding brought together the elite of the Canadian Mafia being attended by Vincenzo Cotroni and Lugi Greco of Montreal, Johnny Papalia of Hamilton, Paul Volpe of Toronto, and Joe Gentile of Vancouver. Luppino sponsored Paul Volpe into the Maggaddio family, and he was likewise close to Volpe, who represented his interests in Toronto.

Luppino had five sons who were involved in organized crime: Vincenzo (Jimmy), Natale (Nat), Rocco, Antonio (Tony) and John Luppino. Luppino saw himself as upholding traditional Italian values against what he saw as the corrupting consumerism of North American society. In a phone conversation with Magaddino, Luppino told him in Italian: "I, Don Stefano, do things for my own dignity". Luppino lived in a modest house on Ottawa Street South on the east end of Hamilton. He was often seen tending his garden during the summer as he preferred to grow his food. His only known source of income was his veterans' pension from his service in the Regio Esercito in World War I, a sum of lire that amounted to the equivalent of CAD$175 per month. Luppino greatly disapproved of the social changes of the 1960s and endlessly bemoaned that the younger generation of Italian-Canadians was materialistic, self-interested, and lacked respect for older men such as himself. The changes that Luppino disapproved affected his own family as the police wiretaps revealed that Luppino complained that his own sons did not show him the respect he felt he deserved and that one of his sons was in a common-law relationship with a woman. Luppino allowed his son to visit him, but never his girlfriend as he stated that any woman who engaged in premarital sex was not allowed in his house.

Luppino's main sources of income were loan-sharking, extortion and the construction business. Luppino cared more about ostentatious displays of his power than about wealth. One Hamilton policeman told the media: "Power and prestige, that's what it's all about. Really, that's what the man's about. The key to the whole thing is prestige. The way he can lay fear on people just because he is there. He'd rather have someone call him Mr. Luppino than give him $10,000". In 1967, police began a five-year surveillance operation of Giacomo Luppino, which included wiretapping his Hamilton home. In one wiretapped phone call, Luppino stated: "It is the same as saying there is a company at Hamilton, at Toronto and there is a head of each. Toronto represents the centre and Hamilton the commanding point. In Oakville, there are two, but all these abboccatos [regions] are represented by one. In other words, we have to play the way I say". In 1966, when Magaddino planned to have Cotroni killed for his loyalty to Joe Bonanno, Luppino persuaded him to abandon the murder plot. Luppino was one of the few men whom Magaddino respected and would listen to. Luppino persuaded Maggaddino that when Cotroni died, Violi would succeed him, and this way Montreal would be brought under control of the Maggaddino family, which was preferable to sparking a bloody mob war.

Luppino was very close to Violi, who he felt was the son that he wished he had as he believed that Violi upheld traditional values in a way that his sons did not. Violi in a wiretapped phone call stated: "You know what my uncle Michelino told me...he said he gets great satisfaction in talking with me because I know and talk to him in the same way as if we were in our own town but the rest, he said they do it the American way...it appears that here in America things can only be fixed with money". In one wiretapped phone call to Violi, Luppino told him that he had threatened to kill a man who had beaten a woman as he said: "I told him what kind of half man he is. If I have to do something in fear I'll go and drown myself in the lake." In another wiretapped phone call, Luppino told Violi that he wished his English was better so that he could set up his own business because "people here are much easier to cheat than in Italy". When Papalia was released from prison in 1968, he returned to reporting to Luppino. A police wiretap recorded Papalia as complaining to Luppino that Cotroni was still loyal to Bonnanno and not Magaddino, Luppino replied it was "the Commission" (the governing board of the American Mafia) that decided these matters. Luppino told Papalia: "We are all under the Commission". It was in 1969 that Papalia started to be known as "the Enforcer" who reported to Luppino who in turn represented Magaddino. The journalist Jerry Langton described Luppino's relationship with the Papalia family in the 1970s: "He ruled Hamilton's 'Ndrangheta for years before Papalia's star began to rise, but he too answered to Magaddino, the power in the region. When Papalia was powerful enough to take over Hamilton, Luppino gracefully backed into a subordinate role".

When Cotroni started to suffer from prostate cancer in the early 1970s, Violi became the de facto boss of the Cotroni family, which in turn increased Luppino's power. The gangster and police informant Marvin Elkind was in debt to Luppino after his release from prison in 1970. Luppino used Elkind to take envelopes full of cash to Montreal to hand over to Violi. Elkind said of Luppino: "I really liked Old Man Giacomo. He was a tremendous man. I used his weakness to my advantage and that was children. He loved children. Family was very important to him. I went there on Sunday and I had one daughter hold one hand and the other daughter in the other and Giacomo was there raking the lawn and working in his garden. There was the big boss of the mob, out raking the leaves in his yard, wearing an old grey sweater and a felt hat. And Mrs. Luppino came out with cookies for the kids. I said all I needed was three months when I didn't have to make payments and then I could sort it all out. Luppino said he would agree if he got a kiss on the cheek from my kids. My two little girls go up and they each gave him a kiss on the cheek, one of the girls on each side. He said he'll give me a six months break. I'd asked for three, but he said he'd give me six months, three for each kiss".

In 1978 Violi was murdered. Luppino together with Michele "Mike" Racco of Toronto and Frank Sylvestro of Guelph, were the only non-Montreal Mafiosi to make the trip to Montreal to attend Violi's funeral. At the funeral service, Luppino was visibly distraught and cried at the service.

Following the example set by the Musitano family, Luppino started to employ outlaw biker gangs as subcontractors. A report in the Hamilton Spectator in October 1980 stated that: "A group headed by Giaccomo Luppino of Ottawa Street South, the closest thing Canada has to a Hollywood-style 'Godfather' has established a pipeline with the bikers for contract work...The bikers are being played for suckers in the incidents, taking all of the heat and very little of the profit. Paid by the mob anywhere from $400 to $1,000 an assignment, the bikers have placed bombs or incendiary devices at extortion targets. The extortionists, meanwhile, reap greater rewards from $25,000 in cash to complete takeovers of businesses worth more than $100,000".

== Death ==
Ever since Violi's slaying in 1978, the Luppino and Violi families have been very hostile towards the Rizzuto family. Luppino suffered from senility in his last years, which he spent at St. Joseph's Hospital in Hamilton from 1983 onward. He died there on 18 March 1987. His funeral was one of the grandest Mafia funerals seen in Canada with 150 cars taking part in the funeral procession. Luppino's funeral was attended by Mafiosi from Ontario, Quebec, the United States and Italy. He is buried at Gate of Heaven Catholic Cemetery in Burlington, Ontario.

== Books ==
- Auger, Michel; Edwards, Peter (2004). The Encyclopedia of Canadian Organized Crime: From Captain Kidd to Mom Boucher. Toronto: McClelland & Stewart. ISBN 0771030495.
- Cédilot, André; Noël, André (2010). Mafia Inc.: The Long, Bloody Reign of Canada's Sicilian Clan. Toronto: Vintage Canada. ISBN 9780307360410.
- Edwards, Peter (1990). Blood Brothers: How Canada's Most Powerful Mafia Family Runs Its Business. Toronto: Key Porter Books. ISBN 155013213X.
- Langton, Jerry (2015). Cold War How Organized Crime Works in Canad and Why It's About to Get More Violent. Toronto: HarperColllins. ISBN 978-1-4434-3255-9.
- Humphreys, Adrian (1999). The Enforcer:Johnny Pops Papalia, A Life and Death in the Mafia. Toronto, Canada: Harper Collins. ISBN 0-00-200016-4.
- Humphreys, Adrian (2011). The Weasel: A Double Life in the Mob. Toronto: John Wiley & Sons. ISBN 978-0470964514.
- Schneider, Stephen (2009). Iced The Story of Organized Crime in Canada. Toronto: John Wiley & Sons. ISBN 9780470835005.
