= Markham, Virginia =

Markham, Virginia may refer to:

- Markham, Fauquier County, Virginia
- Markham, Pittsylvania County, Virginia
