= Rocco Zito =

Italian criminal

- Born: 19 August 1928; Fiumara, Calabria, Italy
- Died: 29 January 2016 (aged 87); Toronto, Ontario, Canada
- Cause of death: Gunshot
- Citizenship: Canada
- Occupations: Crime boss; ceramic tile salesman
- Allegiance: Siderno Group
- Conviction: Manslaughter (1986)
- Penalty: Two and a half years in jail

Rocco Zito (Italian: [ˈrɔkko dˈdziːto]; 19 August 1928 – 29 January 2016) was an Italian-Canadian crime boss of the 'Ndrangheta in Canada, a Mafia-type organisation originating in Calabria, Italy. He was also a founding member of the Camera di Controllo in Canada in 1962. In 1986, he was convicted of manslaughter and sentenced to two and a half years in jail. On 29 January 2016, Zito was shot to death by his son-in-law Domenico Scopelliti in a domestic dispute. After the shooting, Scopelliti fled, but turned himself in hours later to police, and was charged with first-degree murder. Scopelliti was charged with manslaughter after being found not guilty of first and second degree murder. On 5 September 2018, he was sentenced to five years and eight months in prison.

== Early life ==
Zito was born into a 'Ndrangheta crime family in Fiumara, Calabria, on 19 August 1928, one of six sons to Domenico and Angela. His father and uncle, Giuseppe, were both 'Ndrangheta members. Zito tried to immigrate to North America illegally twice, once as a stowaway on a ship headed to New York City in 1947, and two years later trying to enter Texas at Galveston through Mexico; both times he was caught and deported. A murder charge against him in Italy was dropped in 1952 before he entered Canada legally through Montreal three years later, then relocating to Toronto as its connection to the Montreal mafia-bootlegging scheme.

== Activities and convicted manslaughter ==
Police long believed he earned that money through gambling, loan sharking, drugs, fraud, counterfeiting and other criminal ventures. He also had an early bootlegging conviction. Zito was first a police target in Canada in 1960 in a fraud investigation and by 1962, he was seen meeting with powerful mob figures, including Giacomo Luppino boss of the Luppino crime family and Michele Racco of the Siderno Group. He received his Canadian citizenship in 1961 and was believed to be a founding member of the Camera di Controllo since 1962.

Police also spotted Zito meeting with convicted heroin trafficker New York mobster Paolo Gambino of the Gambino crime family, who was setting up a heroin pipeline to Toronto, at a Toronto hotel on 4 May 1970.

In 1978, a police investigation of a counterfeiting operation focused on a printing company Zito owned. It led to the seizure of $1.7 million in counterfeit money in Vancouver, with the bills originating in Toronto but charges against him were never laid.

By the 1980s, Zito was boss of the Toronto Siderno Group after the death of Michele Racco. Police also spotted Zito often rambling through Toronto's Little Italy in the 1980s, meeting with other mob bosses like Montreal's Frank Cotroni. Zito was also aware of listening devices and used a soft voice and hand motions to communicate.

In 1986, Zito was convicted of manslaughter for the killing of photo studio owner Rosario Sciarrino on 13 January 1986, for not being able to pay back a $20,000 loan plus interest for the loan sharking. Sciarrino's body was found frozen and wrapped in garbage bags in the trunk of his car after a meeting in a Brampton meat company. An autopsy showed Sciarrino was shot in the head and chest, and suffered a dozen facial fractures from an ashtray. Zito initially vanished after the shooting, but surrendered four days later to Peel homicide detectives. He limped in from a gunshot wound to the leg, telling police that "I, Rocco Zito, was shot on Monday, Jan. 13th, by persons unknown." Police suspected the wound was self-inflicted to instill legal doubt in the initial second-degree murder charge in Sciarrino's death, and was sentenced to four and a half years in prison.

In 1987, Zito was sentenced to two and a half years in jail for possessing stolen goods and proceeds of crime.

== Death ==
Zito was shot to death in his North York home on 29 January 2016, by his son-in-law Domenico Scopelliti in a domestic dispute at the age of 87. Scopelliti and his family shared the home with Zito. After the shooting, Scopelliti fled, but turned himself in hours later to police, and was charged with first-degree murder. Police found at least six guns — including a pistol and a rifle — and ammunition, stashed in closets, linen drawers and cabinets in his home. Police also found a total of $23,390 in Canadian currency, €18,570 and $251 in American currency, stashed in a briefcase, wallets, an envelope and a drawer in his home. In April 2018, Domenico Scopelliti's then-wife, and one of Zito's daughters, Laura Scopelliti, who later divorced Domenico after the incident, testified in a Toronto court about the dialogue used between the two men before the shooting, and about the origins of the $1 million in his bank account and money found inside the home. On 18 May 2018, Scopelliti stated in court that he killed Zito after he had a gun point at him, fearing for his life. However, on 20 June 2018, another one of Zito's daughters, Angela Buda testified she was standing close to her father and that he did not have a gun when he was shot. Scopelliti was charged with manslaughter after found not guilty of first and second degree murder. On 5 September 2018, Scopelliti was sentenced to five years and eight months in prison.

== Style and philosophy ==
"If you were to look at the guy, you'd never guess he was a Mafia chieftain... He drove a car that was as plain as you could buy — no extras, no options, no flash, no nothing... He dressed very plainly, lived quietly as he could."

— Larry Tronstad, a retired RCMP Staff Sergeant who led an anti-Mafia unit that probed Zito for years.

Zito officially listed his occupation as a ceramic tile salesman as a business front. He lived by the philosophy of old-school modesty, disliking the flash of the modern Mafia, with its extravagant displays of wealth to show power; he believed true respect, came from "honour." He often dismissed younger mobsters who resided in Woodbridge, north of Toronto, as "Hollywood". Zito once stated, "In my day, we didn't have the big houses, drive the big cars and the suits and all the flash... But all the guys in Woodbridge have the big houses and drive the big, black SUVs and put on airs."
