= Markham, Pittsylvania County, Virginia =

Unincorporated community in Virginia, US

Coordinates: 36°52′45″N 79°14′30″W

Markham, Pittsylvania County is an unincorporated community in Pittsylvania County, in the U.S. state of Virginia.
