= Markham House (Dublin, New Hampshire) =

Historic house in New Hampshire, United States

- U.S. National Register of Historic Places
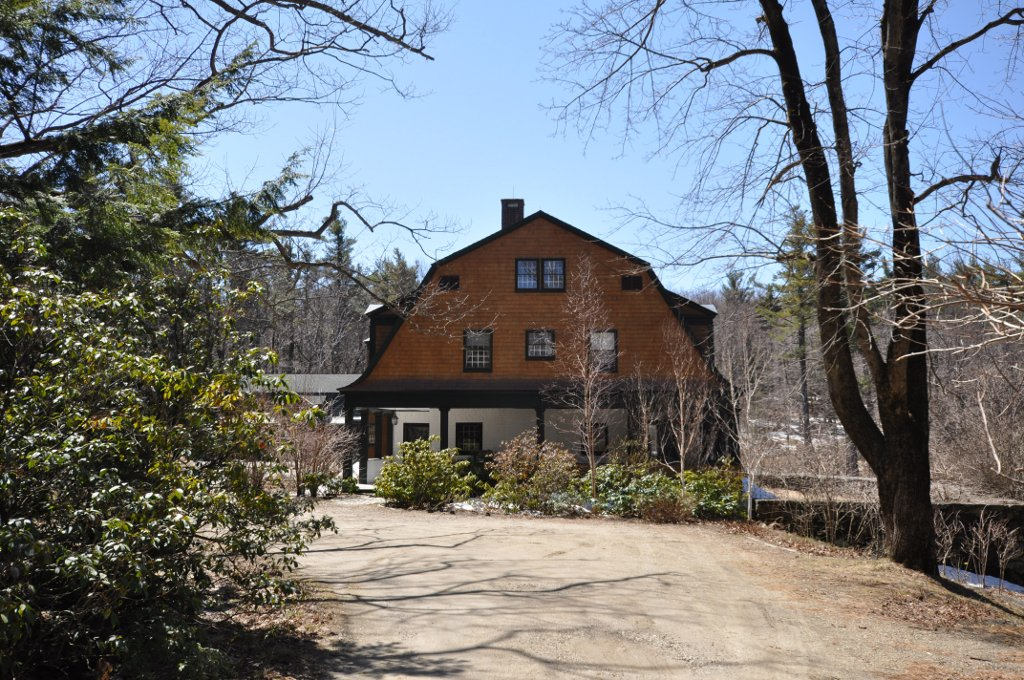

- Location within New Hampshire Location within the United States
- Location: Snow Hill Rd., Dublin, New Hampshire
- Coordinates: 42°54′11″N 72°4′6″W
- Area: 0.4 acres (0.16 ha)
- Built: 1898
- Built by: H.A. Patterson
- Architect: Shepley, Rutan and Coolidge
- Architectural style: Colonial Revival, Shingle Style
- MPS: Dublin MRA
- NRHP reference No.: 83004044
- Added to NRHP: December 18, 1983

The Markham House is an historic summer house on Snow Hill Road in Dublin, New Hampshire. Built in 1898, it is one of two houses in the town to be designed by the prominent Boston architectural firm Shepley, Rutan and Coolidge, and is a prominent local example of Shingle style architecture. The house was listed on the National Register of Historic Places in 1983.

== Description and history ==
The Markham House stands in a rural setting west of the village center of Dublin, on the west side of Snow Hill Road a short way south of its junction with Main Street (New Hampshire Route 101). It is set in a small clearing on a slope with west-facing views of nearby Dublin Pond. It is a three-story frame structure, with a gambrel roof and shingled exterior. The roof hangs over a recessed porch on the ground floor, and its steep west face has a long shed-roof dormer whose windows are topped by shallow gables. A service wing extends west from the main block.

The house was designed by Shepley, Rutan and Coolidge and built in 1898 for Mrs. Hugh McKittrick, whose daughter later married George D. Markham. It is one of two known designs by this firm in Dublin; the other is the main house of the Knollwood estate. The area immediately west of the house was landscaped about 1910 by the Boston landscape designers Brent and Hall. In the mid-20th century, the house was purchased by Gray Thoron, dean of the Cornell University Law School.

== See also ==
- National Register of Historic Places listings in Cheshire County, New Hampshire
