= Markham Farmstead =

- U.S. National Register of Historic Places
- U.S. Historic district
- Location within South Dakota Location within the United States
- Location: Junction of County Roads 4 and 7, near Conde, South Dakota
- Coordinates: 45°12′01″N 98°12′30″W
- Area: 15 acres (6.1 ha)
- Built: 1884
- Built by: Austin, Bert; Markham, Kate
- NRHP reference No.: 90000958
- Added to NRHP: September 13, 1990

The Markham Farmstead near Conde, South Dakota was listed on the National Register of Historic Places in 1990. It is located at the junction of Spink County's County Roads 4 and 7. It has also been known as B.C. Evans Farm.

The listing included two contributing buildings and one non-contributing building, plus one contributing structure and seven non-contributing ones, on 15 acres (6.1 ha).
