= Leo Marcum =

American politician (born 1942)

Member of the Kentucky House of Representatives from the 97th district
- In office January 1, 1978 – January 1, 1980
- Preceded by: W. D. Blair
- Succeeded by: W. D. Blair

Personal details
- Born: August 10, 1942 Laura, Kentucky, US
- Died: January 8, 2023 (aged 80) Mount Sterling, Kentucky, US
- Party: Republican
- Occupation: Attorney (disbarred)

Leo A. Marcum (August 10, 1942 – January 8, 2023) was an American politician in the state of Kentucky. He served in the Kentucky House of Representatives as a Republican from 1978 to 1979. Marcum was a lawyer, serving as a Commonwealth Attorney from the 24th Judicial district from 1987 to 2002. He was disbarred in 2012 after being found guilty on charges of tax evasion.

Marcum died on January 8, 2023, at his home in Mount Sterling, Kentucky.
