= Markham By-Pass =

Markham By-Pass refers to roadways in Cornell, Ontario that were built to bypass Ontario Highway 48 or Markham Road:

- York Regional Road 48, known as Markham By-Pass from 2004 to 2006 and now referred to as Donald Cousens Parkway since 2007
- Old Markham By-Pass, renamed as Cornell Centre Boulevard in 2004
