= Markham Gang =

The Markham Gang was a notorious criminal organization located primarily in Ontario, Canada, in the middle of the 19th century. Evolving from organizations founded to support the Upper Canada Rebellion of 1837, the Markham Gang used its private communications network of couriers across what was then Canada West to build a criminal empire that spread into neighbouring states. Like the organization that spawned them, the Markham Gang was made up primarily of well-to-do farm owners and their families. The gang was broken up in 1846 with one hanging, four life imprisonments and many lesser convictions, but the survivors were almost all released within five years and returned to society. The name of the gang, an invention of the press, came from the final series of arrests which took place in Markham.

== Activities ==
Most of the gang's activities could best be described as petty theft, including stealing watches, blankets and clothing on lines, harnesses from barns, and even "pilfering from hen's roosts" (stealing eggs). To make the system pay, the gang organized pickups to collect the stolen goods and carry them far from the site of the theft, where they could be safely sold without suspicion. No member was allowed to take any items to their own homes, and search warrants failed to turn up any incriminating evidence as a result.

Items worth more money, like watches, could be transported as far as Canada East, where they would be exchanged for counterfeit money at the rate of $100 for each $10 of goods. The counterfeit money, known as "boodle", was then distributed to the lower ranking members of the gang. The boodle was passed off locally by these members, who were careful to carry only one counterfeit bill and always be able to make good any payment if the bill was questioned. Boodle was also produced locally by members of the gang, notably Matthew Udell.

Higher-ranking members of the gang also added horse and cattle stealing to their activities. Organizing via the same networks used for distribution of smaller goods, the members would arrange to steal two horses on the same night. They would then meet, switch horses, and ride home the same night. That way they were in their home town in the morning, with a horse that was from so far away they could not have travelled to that town and back in one night. In one instance they added another twist to the action; having been told where "his" horse had been sold in Newcastle, Thomas Alsop went to the farmer with an affidavit stating it had been stolen, along with a description that unsurprisingly matched his accomplice, Henry Johnson. The farmer, worried about being in possession of stolen goods, immediately turned the horse over to Alsop, who then sold it further abroad. Johnson then pulled the same trick against the farmer Alsop had sold his horse to in Brantford. Both were able to use this trick several times in a row, ultimately reaching the US border and selling them for the last time there.

Couriers were also used to scout out locations for more complete robberies, by plying their trades among the farms and then communicating the locations of worthwhile goods up the hierarchy. The gang made sure that the non-professional "special constables" that were the only semblance of police outside Toronto or Kingston, were either part of the gang or threatened off. With no inter-country recording of crimes, the pattern of activity was never spotted in spite of it being widespread.

== Breakup ==
On the night of 7 November 1845 several high-ranking members of the gang from the Reach Township robbed a local farmer, John Morrow, believing he had large amounts of cash in his house. They burst in upon him at night, but found only $72.50 that he made selling some oxen in Uxbridge. Believing Morrow was holding out, they assaulted both Morrow and his wife trying to find more, before rummaging about the house and finally leaving. Morrow recognized several people in the group and reported the events the next day.

Hiram and James Stoutenborough were arrested on 12 November and released on bail. Soon after, however, Casper Stotts was arrested and questioned by George Gurnett, Clerk of the Peace for the Home District and alderman of Toronto, and powerful member of the Family Compact. Stotts turned on Daniel Spencer, and soon the two led to the arrest of Burr, Alsop, The Badgerow brothers, and many others. King Street Gaol was soon filling up with members, caught on the lam or fetched from other prisons.

William Hume Blake, leader of the Reform Party and a major foe of the Family Compact, came to the defence of the accused. He portrayed the case as being politically motivated, with Gurnett paying back supporters of William Lyon Mackenzie with threats of jail time or hangings. Although his defence was spirited, in the end Robert Burr, Nathan Case and Hiram and James Stoutenborough were all sentenced to death for their part in the Morrow robbery, and a further eleven members received sentences between 7 years and 8 months for larceny or forgery. However, the death penalties were later commuted to prison sentences by the Attorney General of the Province of Canada, which was a common practice in the British colonies.

This was not quite the end of the gang, however. On the morning of 12 November 1846, William McPhillips, manager of Logan's General Store in Markham, was found dead after apparently having been beaten with a hammer the night before. Gurnett personally traveled to Markham and questioned everyone about possible ties to the Markham Gang, but ultimately came away empty-handed. However, several people reported seeing gang member Stephen Turney in Toronto buying jewelry and clothing, and was arrested when he could not explain where he got them. After first blaming John Biggins, claiming he was merely an accomplice, the court convicted Turney and he was hanged on 23 June 1847.

The case captured the attention of the British Colonist newspaper in Toronto. They had been tracking the story of a string of robberies east of Toronto for some time, and dedicated a considerable amount of the efforts to documenting the case now that the gang was being rounded up. The complete story was later published in complete form as "An Account of the Markham Gang". With Turney's arrest the paper once again took the lead publicizing the events, but this time found themselves being castigated by other local newspapers for sensationalizing the events.

The hanging was the final end to the Gang, and as the other members left jail they "took up honest pursuits", many claiming they had lost more money than they could have ever made honestly.

One member of the gang, Oliver Badgerow, is buried in Greenwood Conservation Area in Ajax, Ontario. This land was formerly part of his 100-acre farm. His grave can be found south-east of the main parking lot. An iron railing is in place in an effort to protect the flat gravestone on which his name is still clearly visible.

== In culture and literature ==
- A reference to the Markham Gang plays a pivotal role in J. Ross Clara's short play Open Mic.
