= Morecambe (disambiguation) =

Morecambe is a seaside town in Lancashire, England.

Morecambe may also refer to:

== Places ==
- Morecambe, Alberta, a hamlet in Canada

== People ==
- Eric Morecambe (1926–1984), English comedian

== Other ==
- Morecambe railway station
- Morecambe Promenade railway station, former railway station simply named Morecambe 1907–1924 and 1968–1994
- Morecambe F.C., a football team based in Morecambe, Lancashire, England
- Morecambe FC Women, a women's football team based in Morecambe, Lancashire, England
- Morecambe (play), based on the life of Eric Morecambe
