= Micheline Aharonian Marcom =

American writer

- Born: 1968 (age 57–58); Dhahran, Saudi Arabia
- Occupation: Novelist
- Website: www.michelinemarcom.com

Micheline Aharonian Marcom (born 1968) is an American novelist.

== Life and work ==
Micheline Aharonian Marcom was born in Dhahran, Saudi Arabia in 1968 to an American father and an Armenian-Lebanese mother. She grew up in Los Angeles, but as a child in the years before the Lebanese Civil War, she spent summers in Beirut with her mother's family.

Her first book and the beginning of a trilogy of novels, Three Apples Fell from Heaven (2001), is set in Turkey between 1915–1917 and depicts the Ottoman government's genocide of the Armenian population. It was named one of the best books of the year by both The Washington Post and the Los Angeles Times. Her second book in the trilogy, The Daydreaming Boy (2004), which earned her the 2004 Lannan Literary Fellowship as well as the 2005 PEN/USA Award for Fiction, is centered on a middle-aged survivor of the genocide living in a 1960s Beirut which itself is facing collapse. The culmination of the trilogy, Draining the Sea (2008), is a critique of America's complicit involvement in the Guatemalan Civil War.

Marcom's fourth novel — whose original title “The Edge of Love" was a reference to Clarice Lispector's story That’s Where I’m Going — was published by Dalkey Archive Press as The Mirror in the Well (2008).

Her fifth book, A Brief History of Yes, was published in 2013 by Dalkey Archive Press.

Her sixth book, The Brick House, was published in 2017 by Awst Press.

The New American, her seventh novel, about a DREAMer who is deported to Guatemala and makes his way home to California, was published in 2020.

In 2008, Marcom taught at Haigazian University in Beirut on a Fulbright Fellowship. She is a professor of Creative Writing at the University of Virginia.

== Awards ==
- 2022 Finalist Neustadt International Prize for Literature
- 2012 United States Artists Fellow
- 2006 Whiting Award
- 2005 PEN/USA Award for Fiction
- 2004 Lannan Foundation Literary Fellowship

== Publications ==
- Three Apples Fell from Heaven. Riverhead Books. 2001. ISBN 978-1-57322-915-9.
- The Daydreaming Boy. Riverhead Books. 2004. ISBN 978-1-59448-075-1.
- Draining the Sea. Riverhead Books. 2008. ISBN 978-1-59448-973-0.
- The Mirror in the Well. Dalkey Archive Press. 2008. ISBN 978-1-56478-511-4.
- A Brief History of Yes. Dalkey Archive Press. 2013. ISBN 978-1-56478-849-8.
- The Brick House. Awst Press. 2017. ISBN 978-0-99719-385-5.
- The New American. Simon & Schuster. 2020. ISBN 978-1982120726.
- Small Pieces. Dalkey Archive Press. 2023. ISBN 978-1628974508.
