= Paul Volpe (mobster) =

Canadian gangster (1927–1983)

- Born: 31 January 1927; Toronto, Ontario, Canada
- Died: 13 November 1983 (aged 56); Toronto, Ontario, Canada
- Cause of death: Murder by gunshot wounds
- Other name: "The Fox"
- Occupation: Mobster
- Spouse: Lisa Dalhot
- Allegiance: Buffalo crime family
- Conviction: Extortion (1968)
- Penalty: 2 years' imprisonment

Paul "The Fox" Volpe (Italian: [ˈvolpe]; 31 January 1927 – 13 November 1983) was a Canadian mobster and Toronto-based member of the Buffalo crime family.

== Criminal activities ==
Volpe was born on 31 January 1927 in Toronto, to poor Italian immigrants. His father, a tailor, died when he was young. He had a sister Laura, and four older brothers, Albert, Eugene, Frank and Joseph, who owned a car wash together, while also being involved in rackets. In 1959, Volpe began operating a stock fraud scheme in Toronto and Hamilton through his connection with mobsters Jimmy Luppino and Harold Bordonaro, the son of Charlie Bordonaro, until he was run out by Hamilton mob figure Johnny Papalia. He started making strong connections with the Buffalo crime family and other syndicates and started running a casino in Port-au-Prince, Haiti in 1963 until returning to Toronto in 1965. The same year, Volpe extorted stock promoter Richard Angle, who was wearing wiretaps for police. Three days after Volpe got married, he was sentenced to two years in jail on 21 June 1968 for extortion. When he was released in 1969, he started forming a formal gang that did not favour a specific ethnicity – the most notable of which were: Nathan Klegerman, who helped with jewellery theft, loansharking and stock frauds; Chuck Yanover, who was the weapons expert; Murray Feldberg, who was the loan shark; Ron Mooney, who specialized in burglaries and crooked card games; and Ian Rosenberg, who was as an enforcer.

In August 1971, at a meeting in Toronto, Giacomo Luppino shifted control of the construction unions in Toronto from Papalia to Volpe. By the early 1970s, Volpe worked with Natale Luppino, son of mob boss Giacomo Luppino of the Luppino crime family, on schemes where they would be paid kickbacks from both the union and the developers for negotiating construction contracts. Volpe was later sponsored as a made member of the Buffalo family by Giacomo Luppino, Jimmy Luppino and Harold Bordonaro in Hamilton. Volpe maintained a close relationship with both the Luppino and Bordonaro families in Hamilton. In 1974, a Royal Commission was brought together to investigate the building industry. On 22 April 1977, Rosenberg was murdered for suspected collaboration with the police.

With Volpe living a more outlandish lifestyle and agreeing to appear in an extensive CBC News documentary in 1977, he accidentally overexposed the Canadian mob. Later that year, Volpe went south to Atlantic City, New Jersey where he began investing in real estate after "the okay" from Angelo Bruno of the Philadelphia crime family that operated the city. With the murder of Bruno in 1980 and the up rise of new power in the city, Volpe returned to Toronto, but without his previous gang as most were in jail or fled.

In 1979, Volpe bought a mansion in Schomberg, Ontario. Volpe's decision to live in Schomberg instead of Woodbridge or St. Clair Avenue West in Toronto, which were the normal homes for Toronto-area mafiosi, marked him out as something of an outsider within the Toronto Mafia. Volpe's mansion was a Tudor-style house which he named Fox Hill. Fox Hill had a huge Canadian flag flying on the front lawn and was lit up by floodlights at night, which marked Volpe out as a man who was seeking attention, which was not the norm with gangsters. Volpe was highly unusual in the Mafia subculture in admitting that he had been involved in gay relationships as a young man and he had an affair with a young actor. Volpe's wife, Lisa Dalhot, was a Danish-Canadian woman who worked first as a model and then as a fashion buyer for the Creeds stores. Volpe was viewed as a "troublesome and distant" character within the Mafia, an eccentric gangster who moralistically lectured his fellow mafiosi on the evils of pornography and prostitution, and as a "loner" who did not cultivate close ties with other mobsters. Volpe was respected for his intelligence and ability to make money, but always seen as an outsider within his milieu.

== Death ==
The Buffalo crime family also operated in Toronto and Hamilton, and in 1981, hired former Satan's Choice biker and hitman Cecil Kirby to kill Volpe and his driver Pietro Scarcella in an arrangement with Rocco Remo Commisso of the Commisso family of Toronto, for $20,000. However, the plot was foiled when Kirby turned Royal Canadian Mounted Police (RCMP) informant. Volpe, who had a reputation for being devious and treacherous, had involved the Commissos in a real estate deal and cheated them, causing them to vow vengeance. During a conversation on 31 March 1981, Commisso told Kirby that he needed the approval of an unnamed higher authority before he could give the orders to kill Volpe. When Kirby asked "What about Volpe?", Commisso replied: "I'm waiting for an answer, OK?" On 23 April 1981, Commisso told Kirby that Scarcella could not be killed until he received permission from the unnamed authority, but he had the approval to kill Volpe. Commisso stated: "Ah, Scarcella, forget about it for now. Just don't worry about it for now", leading Kirby to ask "For how long?". Commisso replied: "A month, two months, we don't know yet. There's another guy". When Kirby asked "What the fuck is going on?", Commisso answered: "There's another guy I want you to take care of instead of him."

Sergeant Al King of the Toronto police visited Volpe to tell him that a contract had been placed on his life and asked him if he would like to cooperate by faking his death, a request that Volpe agreed to despite the fact that it was a violation of the Mafia code. Sergeant King later stated he had been expecting that Volpe would refuse his request, and was most surprised that he agreed to assist the police. Wearing a wire, Kirby went to the house of Rocco Remo Commisso on 16 May 1981 to tell him: "Volpe, he's dead... I just killed him a hour ago". In fact, Volpe and his wife Lisa were in hiding at the RCMP's Toronto office. Commisso asked for proof that Kirby had indeed killed Volpe, leading him to produce Volpe's wallet with his driver's license in it, which Kirby said he had taken from his corpse. After looking over the wallet, Commisso was finally satisfied that Kirby had killed Volpe. After complaining that he should not have come to his house, Commisso paid Kirby $1,000 and said he would have more money for him soon. Commisso repeatedly assured Kirby that he and his brothers "would take care" of him. In organized crime, excessive displays of affection and loyalty are often a sign that those displaying the sympathy are in fact planning to kill the seeming object of their affection, and Kirby was disturbed by the number of times Commisso told him that he was almost family to him and his brothers. In 1982, the Commisso brothers were arrested by the RCMP and charged with conspiracy to commit murder.

Volpe's violation of the Mafia code by co-operating with the police was not forgiven, and on 13 November 1983, Volpe was murdered and found dead the next day in the trunk of his wife's BMW at Pearson International Airport; Scarcella is said to have been the last person to see Volpe alive before his unsolved murder. Many police officers suspect that Enio Mora—who was an associate of Volpe's—at least helped to lure him to his death. Papalia and Montreal hitman Réal Simard have also been linked with Volpe's murder, but no charges were laid. The police informer Marvin Elkind stated that Volpe was murdered on the orders of Philadelphia mob boss Nicodemo "Little Nicky" Scarfo on the account of his real estate scams in Atlantic City, which he failed to cut him in on. In the Mafia subculture, leaving a corpse at an airport is a sign that the victim had problems abroad, and Elkind noted it was no accident that Volpe's corpse was left in the parking lot of Pearson airport, where it was meant to be found.

== See also ==
- List of unsolved murders (1980–1999)

== Sources ==
- Auger, Michel; Edwards, Peter (2012). The Encyclopedia of Canadian Organized Crime: From Captain Kidd to Mom Boucher. Toronto: McClelland & Stewart. ISBN 978-0771030499.
- Humphreys, Adrian (2011). The Weasel: A Double Life in the Mob. Toronto: John Wiley & Sons. ISBN 978-0470964514.
