= Luppino crime family =

Italian-Canadian crime family

- Founded: 1956
- Founder: Giacomo Luppino
- Founding location: Hamilton, Ontario, Canada
- Years active: 1950s–present
- Territory: Southern Ontario
- Ethnicity: Italians as "made men" and other ethnicities as associates
- Activities: Racketeering, loan sharking, money laundering, fraud, murder, gambling, drug trafficking, extortion and corruption, paid protection, gun trafficking
- Allies: 'Ndrangheta; Buffalo crime family; Bonanno Crime Family; Russian mafia; Serbian mafia; Various gangs in Hamilton
- Rivals: Independent Soldiers; Musitano crime family; Rizzuto crime family; 14K (triad); Hells Angels

The Luppino crime family, (Italian: [lupˈpiːno]) also known as the Luppino-Violi crime family, is an 'Ndrangheta organized crime family based and founded in Hamilton, Ontario, Canada, in the 1950s by Giacomo Luppino. The Luppino family is one of three centralized Mafia organizations in Hamilton, with the other two being the Musitano crime family and the Papalia crime family.

The Luppinos have had strong connections with the Buffalo crime family of Buffalo, New York.

By 2018, the Violis had an increased role in the organization, particularly Domenico and Giuseppe Violi, the sons of Montreal mob boss Paolo Violi who had married into the Luppino family through Giacomo's daughter. Domenico had reportedly been made the underboss of the Buffalo crime family and one of his duties was to "assume control over the operations of the Luppino-Violi crime family". By late 2018, however, both brothers were imprisoned for drug trafficking offenses. Brothers Natale and Rocco Luppino are believed to be the leaders of the Hamilton-based organisation. In recent times the Luppino crime family has fallen under the control of the Buffalo crime family and is now believed to be the Buffalo family's Canadian crew.

== Luppino, Hamilton and Buffalo ==
Giacomo Luppino was born in 1900 in the village of Oppido Mamertina, Calabria, Italy. Already involved in organized crime in Calabria, Luppino, his wife Domenica (née Todaro) and their 10 children immigrated to Hamilton, in 1956, from Castellace, a subdivision of Oppido Mamertina. Luppino was said to carry a human ear in his wallet. Luppino was the prime suspect in two murders in Italy, though he was never charged in either case. The human ear that Luppino was believed to always have with him is said to have been from an incident when he severed an ear from a man in public to demonstrate his power.

By the time Luppino arrived in Canada, the "Three Dons" had already been established, consisting of Santo Scibetta, Anthony Sylvestro and Calogero Bordonaro, who answered to Stefano Magaddino of the Buffalo crime family. Magaddino's syndicate supplied drugs to Hamilton and Guelph, which in turn supplied drugs to Toronto. Before Scibetta moved to Hamilton, he was already a made member of the Magaddino family. By the early 1960s, Magaddino promoted Santo Scibetta to leader of the Buffalo family's Ontario branch replacing Johnny Papalia who was under indictments in the United States. Throughout the 1950s and 60s, Luppino and Scibetta jointly controlled Hamilton. In the late 1950s, Paul Volpe operated a stock fraud scheme in Toronto and Hamilton with the support of Jimmy Luppino and Harold Bordonaro, the son of Calogero (Charlie) Bordonaro, until Volpe was run out of Hamilton by Papalia.

In the early 1960s, Luppino was the capodecina of the Hamilton faction of Magaddino's Buffalo crime family, giving Luppino control over all of his branches in Ontario. As boss of all bosses in the region, he was a founding member of the Camera di Controllo in Canada in 1962. Luppino had been seen meeting with powerful mob figures, including 'Ndrangheta member Rocco Zito and Siderno Group member Michele Racco. Luppino and Santo Scibetta also answered to Magaddino while Papalia was imprisoned in Canadian and American prisons between 1962 and 1968. The Luppinos also became associated with local bootlegger Paolo Violi, but left for Montreal in 1963 on Giacomo's orders to avoid clashes with Papalia. In Montreal, Violi developed connections with the Cotroni crime family, while maintaining ties with the Luppino family; he married Giacomo's daughter, Grazia in 1965. Giacomo had five sons who were involved in organized crime: Vincenzo (Jimmy), Natale (Nat), Rocco, Antonio (Tony) and John Luppino. In 1966, when Magaddino planned to have Vic Cotroni killed for his loyalty to Joe Bonanno, Luppino persuaded him to abandon the murder plot. Luppino was one of the few men whom Magaddino respected and would listen to.

In 1967, police began a five-year surveillance operation of Giacomo Luppino, which included wiretapping his Hamilton home. In the early 1970s, Natale Luppino worked with Volpe on extortion schemes where they would be paid kickbacks from both the union and the developers for negotiating construction contracts, namely from construction company owner Cesido Romanelli. Giacomo Luppino along with his son Jimmy Luppino and Harold Bordonaro, later sponsored Paul Volpe into the Buffalo crime family. In the mid-1970s, Scibetta died, shifting the leadership entirely to Luppino. Jimmy Luppino mostly worked in the extortion rackets in his native Hamilton and became so notorious in that city that he took to "renting" out his name for a $1,000 fee to other extortionists. Natale Luppino likewise had a reputation in Hamilton and by 1975 had been convicted on various counts of assault, extortion and possession of a deadly weapon.

In 1978, Rocco Luppino, Dominic Musitano, owner of a Hamilton haulage company, and Angelo Natale, president of the Ontario Haulers Association, were charged with conspiracy to commit extortion after police uncovered a protection racket on Ontario's independent trucking industry; after a five-year legal battle, they were acquitted in 1983.

In 1981, Tony and John Luppino, and Gerry Fumo were convicted of fraud in regards to the hostile takeover of the Tops Continental Meats of Hamilton, receiving 15 month, 12 month and 18 month sentences respectively. The owner of Tops Continental, Domenic Returra, was visited by Paulo Violi, who spoke on behalf of his brothers-in-law. On March 18, 1987, Giacomo Luppino died of natural causes at the age of 87, whereby Jimmy Luppino took over the family. Luppino suffered from senility in his last years, which he spent at St. Joseph's Hospital. His funeral was one of the grandest Mafia funerals seen in Canada with 150 cars taking part in the funeral procession.

Statements made during the 2018 trial of mobster Domenico Violi indicated that, several decades earlier, Giaccomo Luppino had been responsible for working out arrangements for the alliance between the Hamilton mob and "the Mafia of Buffalo". In a report on the murder of Cece Luppino in early 2019, CBC News made this statement: "Court documents filed by the RCMP [during the Violi trial] show the Luppino family is connected to a web of organized crime stretching from Hamilton to Buffalo, N.Y." The news item added that the "Luppino-Violi family is a faction of the Todaro crime family" that is based in Buffalo and that Rocco and Natale Luppino were members of the latter.

In a 1999 interview with Musitano family hitman Kenneth Murdock, he revealed he was ordered to kill Jimmy Luppino, but did not go through with the order. Murdock also claimed that he was waiting for Pat Musitano to approve the murders of Natale Luppino and Vincenzo Luppino, as well as Domenic Violi and Giuseppe Violi.

== The Violis and Luppinos ==
A 2002 Halton Police report suggested the Violi brothers, Domenico (Dom) and Giuseppe (Joe) Violi, grandsons to Giacomo Luppino, who moved back to Hamilton with their mother after their father Paolo Violi was killed in Montreal in 1978 by the Sicilian Rizzuto crime family, became affiliated with the Luppino family. Giuseppe Violi was convicted in 1996 for conspiracy to smuggle cocaine, which brought him a seven-year prison sentence. Domenico became a made member in the Buffalo family in January 2015. In November 2017, the brothers were charged with 75 offenses, such as conspiracy to import a controlled substance, possession for the purpose of trafficking a controlled substance, trafficking a controlled substance, trafficking contraband tobacco, trafficking firearms, and participating in a criminal organization. Nine people in total were arrested and charged, including Massimiliano Carfagna of Burlington, Ontario and Adriano Scolieri of Vaughan, Ontario, while warrants went out for additional suspects. During the multi-city bust, police seized large quantities of fentanyl and carfentanil, heroin, cocaine and over 250,000 tablets of controlled substances, some three million cigarettes and several gaming machines. During the same week in November, the FBI arrested several people in New York on related offences; the charges included narcotics trafficking, loansharking and firearms.

In March 2018, Carfagna was sentenced to 10 and a half years in prison for drug trafficking and weapons offenses, and also stated between March and October 2016, he and Giuseppe Violi agreed to import 200 to 300 kilograms of cocaine into Canada. On June 1, 2018, Giuseppe Violi was sentenced to 16 years in prison after pleading guilty on drug trafficking charges. On December 3, 2018, Domenico Violi was sentenced to eight years in prison after pleading guilty to trafficking drugs to a paid undercover police agent for more than US$416,000, as part of a three-year RCMP-led police Project OTremens, during which the agent was officially inducted as a "made" member of the Bonanno crime family in Canada, according to an agreed statement of facts. Criminologist Anna Sergi of the University of Essex stated that "A new alliance between Bonanno associates and the Violi family ... is significant, as it suggests a growing prominence for Calabrian mafia — the 'Ndrangheta — within the New York families and in Canada". Domenico Violi admitted to trafficking approximately 260,000 pills, including PCP, ecstasy and methamphetamine to the undercover agent.

Wiretaps recorded from 2015 to 2017 also indicated Domenico Violi was made the underboss of the Buffalo crime family by boss Joseph Todaro Jr. in October 2017 in a meeting in Florida, the first Canadian to hold the second-highest position in the American Mafia. After being promoted to underboss, Violi is heard on wiretaps boasting that "he had beaten out 30 other people for the position," indicating the Buffalo family had at least 30 made men which included Canadian members such as the Violi brothers' uncles Natale and Rocco Luppino. The wiretaps also revealed the activity of The Commission (the governing body of the American Mafia) as Violi's promotion was so unusual that Joe Todaro Jr. consulted with The Commission for permission to promote Violi as the Buffalo family's new underboss.

According to wiretaps from the Violi brothers case, Giuseppe Violi told the undercover agent back in February 2015 that Cece had been approached about becoming a made member, but Cece had told his father that he believed there was not enough money to be made and "that there are too many headaches". Court documents filed by the RCMP in spring 2019 confirmed a connection between the Luppino family and the mob in Buffalo. During a civil war within the Rizzuto family in the early 2010s, both the Luppino and the Violi families, still angry over the murder of Paolo Violi, supported the anti-Rizzuto faction.

On 30 January 2019, Cece Luppino, son of Rocco Luppino, was shot and killed at a home that was owned by his father at 56 Mountain Brow Blvd in Hamilton. Hamilton Police Service called it a "targeted" hit and suggested that the murder might be related to organized crime. Cece Luppino had no criminal record, however. Detective Sergeant Peter Thom provided only this information to the news media: "I've been told he works for a family business down in Stoney Creek", apparently related to a cafe and real estate.

A subsequent report in January 2020 by The Hamilton Spectator stated that the business was a "realty training centre with an attached café". No charges had been laid as of that time but the news item added that the Cece Luppino murder might have been committed to "send a message to more powerful family members". The report also referenced a 2015 conversation that had been accessed by police; Cece was heard to say that he did not want to be a "made man" in the organized crime aspect of the family but might become involved if he could be sure of a financial benefit.

The Cece Luppino hit may have been related to a home invasion on April 19, 2018, in Hamilton, when three men forced their way into a house at 19 Como Place, owned by Natale Luppino, and stabbed one individual. A police source told CBC News that both of the people in the home at the time were related to Cece Luppino "and are members of the Luppino crime family". In late April 2019, police arrested and charged two of the four suspects in Montreal with attempted murder, while the other two, also from Montreal, were already in custody; none were considered to be Mafia members. At that time of the arrests, there was some speculation as to whether the target of the 2018 incident had actually been Natale Luppino because he was the owner of the house that was targeted.

A 2019 CBC News report later quoted a Mafia expert as stating that "Rizzuto's death paved the way for upheaval in the underworld. There's a power struggle left from the vacuum from Rizzuto". Also in spring 2019, one report stated that the Luppinos and the Musitano crime family seemed to be involved in the city's "mafia war". A report by The Hamilton Spectator discussed a "resurgence of Mafia violence in Hamilton and surrounding areas that has most recently included the shooting of Hamilton mob boss Pat Musitano" but made no connection to the Luppino family. Sources contacted by CBC News led the site to state that "some sort of underworld power struggle is tearing through the region, as old scores are settled and players jockey for power in a time of unrest". The wiretaps of Domenico and Joe Violi recorded a discussion that the Musitanos were supporting the Cuntrera-Caruana Mafia clan who have roots in Montreal and Toronto. The records also refer to a September 2017 recording made by police indicating that Pat Musitano was already a marked man at that time, but provide no indication as to who had authorized the "hit": "The [police agent] stated that [he] would have thought that ‘they’ would have gotten rid of [Pat Musitano] before his brother, [Angelo Musitano, murdered in May 2017]. D Violi stated that 'they' wanted to show [Pat Musitano]; that it was a message, D Violi thought. They had told D Violi that ... [Pat Musitano] would be gone; that that would be one headache out of the way".

In February 2020, two of the accused pleaded guilty to the 2018 invasion of Natale Luppino's home; the court heard that they had indeed planned to target Natale Luppino, in addition to his nephew Giuseppe Capobianco. Charles Boucher-Savard admitted to having stabbed Capobianco and received a four-year sentence; Natale had also been in the home at the time but was not attacked. The second individual, Jonathan Monette, pleaded guilty to conspiracy to commit robbery and was sentenced to one year. Four other persons, from Montreal, faced charges of attempted murder for their roles in the conspiracy.

In November 2021, Domenico Violi was granted day parole. In April 2023, Giuseppe Violi was granted day parole; he had taken two anger management classes in prison.

== Books ==
- Edwards, Peter (1990). Blood Brothers: How Canada's Most Powerful Mafia Family Runs Its Business. Toronto: Key Porter Books. ISBN 155013213X.
- Langton, Jerry (2015). Cold War: How Organized Crime Works in Canada and Why It's About to Get More Violent. Toronto: HarperColllins. ISBN 978-1-4434-3255-9.
- Schneider, Stephen (2009). Iced The Story of Organized Crime in Canada. Toronto: John Wiley & Sons. ISBN 9780470835005.
