= Leuzzi =

Leuzzi is an Italian surname. Notable people with the surname include:

- Giuseppe Leuzzi (born 1941), Italian journalist, essayist, and writer
- Vincenzo Leuzzi (1909–1983), Italian academic

== See also ==
- Luzzi (surname)
