= Papalia crime family =

Italian-Canadian crime family

- Founded: 1940s
- Founders: Antonio Papalia
- Founding location: Hamilton, Ontario
- Years active: 1940s–present
- Territory: Southern Ontario
- Ethnicity: Italians as "made men" and other ethnicities as associates
- Activities: Racketeering, loan sharking, money laundering, gambling, drug trafficking, extortion, fraud and prostitution
- Allies: Buffalo crime family
- Rivals: Musitano crime family and various gangs in Hamilton

The Papalia crime family (Italian: [papaˈliːa]) is a 'Ndrangheta organized crime family based in Hamilton, Ontario, Canada.

Antonio Papalia founded the Papalia family in Canada in the 1940s, and is one of three centralized Mafia organizations in Hamilton, with the other two being the Musitano crime family and the Luppino crime family. The Papalias had strong connections with the Buffalo crime family of Buffalo, New York, under long-reigning boss Johnny Papalia, who was often called "Pops" or "The Enforcer". The killings of Johnny and his lieutenant Carmen Barillaro in 1997, ordered by the Musitanos, had effectively wiped out the family's remaining leaders in Canada. One news report stated that the events of 1997 "decapitated the Papalia family". One leader remained, Johnny's brother Frank, who died in 2014 and retired years before his death.

== History ==
Antonio Papalia was a bootlegger with early Picciotteria values, who immigrated to Canada from Delianuova, Calabria, Italy, in 1912, through New York City before moving on to Montreal, Quebec, then New Brunswick in the coal mines, before finally settling on Railway Street in Hamilton, Ontario, in 1917. Antonio, born in 1894, was thought to have immigrated straight to Canada in 1900, however U.S. immigration records were found in 2004 confirming his origin. Antonio became associated with Calabrian compatriot and notorious bootlegger Rocco Perri, and later Guelph mobster Tony Sylvestro, working as a bootlegger who operated speakeasies. However, Papalia was suspected in playing a role in the murder of Perri's wife Bessie Starkman in 1930.

Antonio's wife Maria Rosa Italiano had a first cousin, Nazzareno "Ned" Italiano, who worked as a heroin dealer for Perri and Starkman. Between May and June 1929, an undercover Royal Canadian Mounted Police officer, Frank Zaneth, was able to penetrate into the Perri-Starkman group by posing as a drug dealer from Montreal. In Toronto and Hamilton, Zaneth purchased considerable amounts of cocaine, heroin and morphine from members of the Perri-Starkman group. On 27 September 1929, Nazzareno Italiano was convicted of trafficking heroin on the basis of the evidence collected by Zaneth and rejected a plea bargain offer from the Crown to testify against his employers Perri and Starkman in exchange for a lighter sentence. The refusal of Perri and Starkman to financially support the Italiano family despite the way he observed Omertà caused much resentment and Antonio was described at the time as being angry with Starkman, who he felt was greedy. Starkman was shot dead with a shotgun on the night of 13 August 1930. Antonio is believed to have been involved in Starkman's murder as her killers fled in an automobile stolen from the garage where Antonio worked. It is also believed that Antonio and his son Johnny Papalia, along with Stefano Magaddino of the Buffalo crime family played a role in Perri's disappearance in 1944 after Perri left members of his Mafia crew "slighted", though both cases remain unsolved.

Antonio's wife, Maria Rosa Italiano, also came from a Mafia family, the Italiano clan, who also participated in Perri's gang. Maria Rosa initially married Antonio's younger brother Giuseppe Papalia Jr., giving birth to two sons in Italy, however when Giuseppe died, she immigrated to Canada with her two sons in 1923 to marry Antonio. Johnny, the oldest brother to Frank, Rocco and Dominic Papalia, half-brothers Joseph and Angelo Papalia, brother-in-law Tony Pugliese, and associates, all worked in running his clubs and gambling operations. In 1940, Antonio Papalia was sent to internment at Camp Petawawa as part of the Italian Canadian internment, as potentially dangerous enemy aliens with alleged fascist connections to Benito Mussolini's regime. During this internment he served some time with Perri, however Papalia was released two years before Perri, in 1941, after he convinced the authorities that he was not a Fascist. The authorities imposed conditions upon his release such as he stay out of Hamilton and regularly check in with the police. Papalia then began to expand his enterprise with his son Johnny who had some relationship with the Buffalo crime family.

In the 1950s, loan sharking and extortion became important parts of the family's operation. In 1955, with assistance from Sylvestro, Papalia started opening charter gambling clubs in Hamilton and Toronto. Sylvestro's son-in-law Dante "Daniel" Gasbarrini, Papalia's brothers Frank, Rocco and Dominic, half-brothers Joseph and Angelo, brother-in-law Tony Pugliese, and associates Red LeBarre, Freddie Gabourie, Frank Marchildon and Jackie Weaver, all worked in running Papalia's clubs. After police raids, Papalia started working with James McDermott and Vincent Feeley in several clubs throughout southern Ontario. The principal enforcer for the family was the boxer Howard Chard, whose scarred face made "the perfect image of frightfulness".

By the late 1950s, Johnny Papalia was a made man in the Buffalo family, and boss of the Papalia family Ontario faction. By the early 1960s, he earned his reputation from the French Connection, a smuggling operation that supplied over 80 percent of America's heroin market between the 1960s and 1970s—developing strong connections with the Buffalo family. By that time, he was considered to be the "most organized crime figure" in Ontario.

Johnny was extradited to the United States for trial in 1962 for his role in the French Connection heroin smuggling ring, found guilty and sentenced to 10 years. In 1968, after serving less than half the sentence, he was released from a United States prison and sent back to Canada.

Shirley Ryce, became the mistress of Rocco Papalia, the younger brother of Johnny, in 1962. Ryce wrote in her 1988 memoir Mob Mistress: How a Canadian Housewife Became a Mafia Playgirl, "I was 23 years old and all of a sudden there I was with people waiting on me and taking care of me. Being Rocco's best girl opened doors for me. I never had to wait for a drink. Everywhere I went I was treated as somebody special. I loved it. Rocco projected power and over the years some of it rubbed off on me ... You need help? They got it for you. You know you didn't have to give them anything back. They were generous that way. Once you became their friend and earned their respect and you were loyal to them, you didn't have to worry ... There was no limit on what they spent. Money was no object. They spent money like water". In 1972, Ryce became the mistress of Frank Papalia, who also used her, having her "entertain" other mafiosi via dinners, drinks and sex, though she was informed that she must never engage in oral sex, which was forbidden to mafiosi. Ryce reported that being a mob mistress had its advantages as she was always had a table for herself and her friends at the bar of the Royal Connaught Hotel, no matter how full the popular bar was.

While Johnny was in jail for an extortion conviction, police focused their attention on his brother Frank, the underboss of the family. In the summer of 1979, police pulled Frank over to ask questions about possible drinking and driving in hopes he would refuse a breathalyzer test, charge him, and impound his car to install wiretaps. Frank did refuse, fined $150, his licence suspended for three months and his car taken to impound, where it was worked on by the Royal Canadian Mounted Police. A court authorization also allowed for the implementation of wiretaps at the Papalias' businesses on Railway Street in Hamilton and consigliere Bruno Monaco's car while parked at Toronto Pearson International Airport. Through the wiretap planted in his car, Frank was heard procuring a woman, Shirley Ryce, for the Papalias' lawyer Clive Bynoe to have sex with her on September 5, 1979. Bynoe was a well known bencher with the Law Society of Upper Canada who had been representing members of the Papalia family since 1961 when he defended Johnny Papalia for beating up Maxi Bluestein. Bynoe was identified by the Ontario Provincial Police in April 1980 and brought in for questioning, where he confessed the sexual favours made available by the Papalias.

Police also identified Ryce a month later and also admitted to being paid by the Papalias for sexual favours, agreeing to cooperate with police by placing a tape recorder in her purse. With her gathered recordings, trial began in the summer of 1981, where Frank and Papalia lieutenant Steve Koaches pleaded guilty to obstructing justice, and in return, Frank's prostitution charge was dropped. Frank was fined $2000 and Koaches jailed for four months. A policeman stated that Ryce was being used for the long-term purposes of the Papalia family, saying, "They do these things for a reason. They do it for the future. They're setting people up to be compromised. Here is a Law Society bencher, he's likey going to become a judge, or if he goes into politics, he'll become the attorney general. They are always looking to compromise people who might help them, even if it's years and years down the road". The fact that Bynoe had paid Papalia $100 in exchange for being allowed to have sex with Ryce left him open to the charge of soliciting prostitution, which had been very embarrassing for him, especially if he was holding a position of power.

Also in late 1979, the wiretaps allowed police to raid homes and businesses for files in a defrauding case. Frank, Rocco, Koaches and Monaco were all arrested and charged with conspiracy to defraud the federal government of $50,000. Some sources indicate this value was over $200,000 after allegedly setting up a business to illegally cash in on grants. However, at the trial, the defence questioned the validity of the wiretap evidence. In late 1981 and early 1982, the trial was halted, and a second trial the following year saw them acquitted. In October 1990, 11 years after the police raids, the charges were withdrawn after the Crown Attorney disallowed the recorded wiretap evidence.

In 1983–1984, Papalia made plans to take over much of downtown Hamilton in a colossal real estate scam which he described as his "retirement fund", which stood to make him hundreds of millions of dollars. The scheme was foiled in a police operation overseen by Al Robinson which sent the police informer Marvin Elkind to meet Papalia on 20 July 1983. Elkind discovered that Papalia along with professional conman Howard Halfpenny had created an investment company, Python Investments, along with a bogus numbered company, as part of their plan. Robinson was able to expose the real estate scam to the media, but Elkind did not record enough incriminating statements for the police to lay charges against Papalia.

In the 1990s, Papalia lieutenant Enio "Pegleg" Mora borrowed $7.2 million from Montreal mob boss Vito Rizzuto, and gave the bulk of the money to Papalia to open an upscale restaurant and nightclub in Toronto. After the Rizzuto crime family were not re-paid, in September 1996, Mora was shot in the head four times at a Vaughan farm; Giacinto Arcuri was arrested and charged with Mora's murder, but was acquitted for lack of evidence.

Johnny Papalia was shot dead on May 31, 1997, at the age of 73, in the parking lot outside his vending machine business, Galaxy Vending, on 20 Railway Street in Hamilton, by hitman Kenneth Murdock, who claimed to be acting on the orders of Angelo and Pat Musitano of the Musitano crime family, who owed $250,000 to Papalia.

After the hit, Murdock also killed Johnny's right-hand man Carmen Barillaro two months later. In November 1998, Murdock pleaded guilty to three counts of second degree murder, was sentenced to life imprisonment, and named Pat and Angelo as the men who had ordered the murders; he was released on parole after serving 13 years. The Musitano's pleaded guilty to conspiracy of Barillaro's death, but not Papalia's, receiving a 10-year sentence in February 2000, but were released in October 2006.

In March 2014, close Papalia family associate Dante "Daniel" Gasbarrini died at the age of 93.

After Johnny's death, the family's influence in Canada declined significantly. "When Johnny left, all the power left with him. You may be in during the glory with the boss, but when the boss goes, you disappear with him", according to Joe Fotia, a retired OPP Detective Staff Sergeant. Reflecting the new power structure, Gerald "Skinny" Ward of Welland, who had long served as the Papalia's family drug distributor and smuggler in the Niagara Peninsula area, went over to the Hells Angels after Johnny's murder.

His brother Frank, who would have been the heir to the operation, decided not to retaliate; instead, he retired and lived inconspicuously. He died of natural causes in April 2014, at the age of 83.

Rocco Papalia died on April 2, 2026, at the age of 91.

== Bibliography ==
- Humphreys, Adrian (1999). The Enforcer:Johnny Pops Papalia, A Life and Death in the Mafia. Toronto, Canada: Harper Collins. ISBN 0-00-200016-4.
  - Humphreys, Adrian (2015). The Enforcer:Johnny Pops Papalia, A Life and Death in the Mafia. Toronto: HarperCollins Publishers Ltd. ISBN 9781443438353. Paperback reprint.
- Humphreys, Adrian (2011). The Weasel: A Double Life in the Mob. Toronto: John Wiley & Sons. ISBN 978-0470964514.
- Langton, Jerry (2010), Showdown: How the Outlaws, Hells Angels and Cops Fought for Control of the Streets, John Wiley & Sons, ISBN 978-0470678787
- Schneider, Stephen (2009). Iced The Story of Organized Crime in Canada. Toronto: John Wiley & Songs. ISBN 9780470835005.
- Zadel, Sonya (5 September 1989). "Motives sought in the murder of two". The Sydney Morning Herald.
