= Enio Mora =

Canadian gangster (1949–1996)

- Born: 1949; Sora, Lazio, Italy
- Died: 11 September 1996 (aged 46–47); Vaughan, Ontario, Canada
- Other name: "Pegleg"
- Occupation: Mobster
- Allegiance: Buffalo crime family Papalia crime family
- Conviction: Conspiracy to sell heroin (1980)
- Penalty: 2 years' imprisonment (1980)

Enio "Pegleg" Mora (Italian pronunciation: [ˈɛːnjo ˈmɔːra]; 1949 – 11 September 1996) was an Italian-born Canadian mobster who became underboss of the Papalia crime family and oversaw the family's operations in the Toronto area.

== Early criminal career ==
Mora was born in Sora, Lazio, but grew up in the south of France. In 1968, he moved to Canada, where he immediately became involved in organized crime. Mora was involved in running illegal gambling houses, home repair scams, loansharking and money laundering. Additional legal activities on his part included the sale of insurance; work as a building contractor; owning a drywalling firm; and operating a restaurant. Initially, Mora worked for the Toronto gangster Rocco Zito. Mora was described by one author as having "a cocky, flamboyant personality". By 1975, Mora was selling heroin, and in November of that year become involved in an offer to sell the drug to undercover policemen. On 11 August 1976, Mora was arrested by the Royal Canadian Mounted Police (RCMP) on charges of conspiracy to sell heroin. Mora did not think much of the charges and several times told the policeman Carl MacLeod that all of the charges would be dismissed by January 1978.

In 1979, Mora was the victim of a murder attempt when much of his lower left leg was torn off by a blast from a shotgun when he was lounging in an illegal gambling house on Harbord Street in Toronto. As a result, Mora was fitted with an artificial leg that caused him to walk with a limp. The prime suspect in the shooting of Mora, Anthony Carnevale, was killed in January 1980 when he was shot dead in the basement apartment that he lived in with his parents. The police regarded Mora as the prime suspect in Carnevale's murder, but he was never charged. The weapon used to kill Carnavale was a shotgun, the same weapon that had cost Mora his leg. On 24 September 1980, Mora made a plea bargain with the Crown under which he pledged guilty to the heroin charges and served two years in prison.

== Papalia family underboss ==
By the early 1980s, Mora had transferred his loyalty from Zito over to Paul Volpe. Mora was also a prime suspect in Volpe's murder as he was one of the last people to see him alive, and the police suspect that Mora at very least helped to lure Volpe into an ambush. After Volpe's murder in 1983, Mora visited Millhaven Penitentiary on 5 February 1984 to meet the imprisoned gangster Antonio "Tony" Musitano of the Musitano family. However, Mora instead joined the Papalia family. In December 1985, a crew of Papalia family Mafiosi led by Carmen Barillaro were charged with extortion from the illegal gambling houses in Toronto's Greektown in the Pape-Danforth area. Mora was one of those charged as part of Barillaro's crew. Mora was known for his practice of dousing those behind in their debts to Johnny Papalia with gasoline and threatening to burn them alive if they refused to pay up promptly. Together with Barillaro, Mora was one of Papalia's principle lieutenants, in charge of the Papalia family's operations in the Toronto area while Barillaro ran the operations in the Niagara Peninsula. Barillaro was considered as the more important of the two owing to the proximity of the Niagara peninsula to the American border and hence placing him in charge of drug-smuggling. Following Mora's convictions on weapons and drugs charges, the government of Canada attempted to deport him to Italy, but Mora's lawyers successfully argued in court that it would be cruel to separate Mora from his wife and three sons, leading the judge to rule that Mora be allowed to stay in Canada.

In 1995, Mora took out a loan of $7.2 million from Vito Rizzuto, the boss of Montreal's Rizzuto family. In turn, Mora handed over most of the loan to Papalia and Barillaro, who used some of it to open nightclubs and restaurants while the rest just vanished. Neither Papalia nor Barillaro were interested in repaying the loan as the police recorded Barillaro saying on his phone "They can't touch us". The Canadian journalists André Cédilot and André Noël wrote that this was a "major mistake" as Rizzuto decided to wipe out the Papalia family's leaders.

In 1995, the police tapped Mora's phone, and heard him talk about a wedding reception he was planning to attend at the Sutton Place Hotel in Toronto. He mentioned in one of his calls that the father of the bride was Alfonso Caruana, who was wanted in Italy for money laundering. Caruana had disappeared and Mora's reference to him was the first indication as to he had gone after fleeing Italy.

== Murder ==
On 11 September 1996, Mora was shot four times in the head and his corpse was left in the trunk of his Cadillac automobile, on Teston Road in rural Vaughan. Detective Sergeant Ron Sandelli of the Toronto police told the media: "It [Mora's murder] sure wasn't a surprise. He had his hand into so many things". The police established via forensic testing that Mora was murdered on a farm in Vaughan, where he often visited, before his body was placed inside of his Cadillac. Mora's corpse was found with his pants and underwear pulled down, an indication that he likely had committed a sexual offense, as within the Mafia subculture removing a murder victim's pants and underwear indicates that the victim had sex with someone whom they were not supposed to. Within the Mafia subculture, for a Mafiosi to have sex with the wife of another Mafiosi is punishable by death. In practice, the enforcement of such rules largely depend upon the seniority of a Mafiosi. Within the Mafia, actions that offended the "honour" of another Mafiosi can be ordered without the approval of a more senior boss.

Giacinto Arcuri was arrested and charged with Mora's murder, but was acquitted for lack of evidence. A shirt with Arcuri's DNA and Mora's blood had been found near where Mora's body had been discovered. Arcuri was unable to explain to the police how his shirt came to be covered with Mora's blood, saying "I have fifty shirts". At his trial in the fall of 2002, Arcuri testified he had been an investor in land speculation alongside Mora; the restaurateur Nicola Galifi; and "a Chinese person". Arcuri was the last person known to see Mora alive, saying he was going to show Mora a treadmill on the day of the murder. However, the Crown's case was circumstantial and the Crown Attorney, Peter Westgate, was unable to give a motive for the murder. Moreover, Arcuri was a frail-looking senior citizen with one eye whom the jury was unable to believe had killed Mora, removed his pants and underwear and then placed his 260-pound corpse into the trunk of a car.

The journalists Peter Edwards and Antonio Nicaso wrote that with the murders of Mora, Papalia and Barillaro within the space of less than a year "created more space" for the Rizzuto family, which was now able to dominate Ontario.

== Books and articles ==
- Auger, Michel; Edwards, Peter (2004). The Encyclopedia of Canadian Organized Crime: From Captain Kidd to Mom Boucher. Toronto: McClelland & Stewart. ISBN 0771030495.
- Cédilot, André; Noël, André (2012). Mafia Inc.: The Long, Bloody Reign of Canada's Sicilian Clan. Toronto: Vintage Canada. ISBN 9780307360410.
- Edwards, Peter; Nicaso, Antonio (2016). Business Or Blood Mafia Boss Vito Rizzuto's Last War. Toronto: Random House of Canada. ISBN 9780345813770.
- Knuckle, Robert (2007). A Master of Deception: Working Undercover for the RCMP. Renfrew: General Store Publishing House. ISBN 978-1897113660.
- Nicaso, Antonio; Danesi, Marcel (2021). Organized Crime A Cultural Introduction. London: Taylor & Francis. ISBN 9781000374407.
- Schneider, Stephen (2009). Iced The Story of Organized Crime in Canada. Toronto: John Wiley & Sons. ISBN 9780470835005.
