= Johnny Papalia =

Canadian mobster (1924–1997)

- Born: John Joseph Papalia; March 18, 1924; Hamilton, Ontario, Canada
- Died: May 31, 1997 (aged 73); Hamilton, Ontario, Canada
- Cause of death: Gunshot
- Resting place: Holy Sepulchre Cemetery, Burlington, Ontario, Canada
- Other names: "Johnny Pops"; "The Enforcer"
- Occupations: Crime boss; drug trafficker
- Spouse: Janetta Hayes (m. 1981; sep. 1983)
- Parent(s): Antonio "Tony" Papalia; Maria Rosa Italiano
- Allegiance: Papalia crime family Buffalo crime family
- Convictions: Possession of narcotics (1949); Assault (1961); Drug trafficking (1963); Extortion (1975)
- Penalty: Two years' imprisonment 18 months' imprisonment (commuted); 10 years' imprisonment; served five years Six years' imprisonment; served four years

John Joseph Papalia (Italian: [papaˈliːa]; March 18, 1924 – May 31, 1997), also known as Johnny Pops Papalia or "The Enforcer", was a Canadian crime boss of the Papalia crime family based in Hamilton, Ontario, Canada. The Papalia crime family is one of three major crime families in Hamilton, the other two being the Musitano crime family and the Luppino crime family.

Papalia was born in Hamilton, to Italian immigrants who also had a history in organized crime. At a young age, he was involved in petty crimes, but by the 1950s, moved his way up to drug trafficking and formed a powerful alliance with the Buffalo crime family. Papalia also operated various gambling bars and vending machine businesses. In the 1960s, he played a role in the French Connection drug smuggling operation, for which he was extradited to the United States and served five years of a 10-year prison sentence. On May 31, 1997, Papalia was shot to death outside his vending machine business by Kenneth Murdock, a hitman hired by Angelo and Pat Musitano of the Musitano crime family.

== Early life and criminal activities ==
Papalia was born on March 18, 1924, in Hamilton. His father, Antonio "Tony" Papalia, who had early Picciotteria values, was a bootlegger who immigrated to Canada from Delianuova, Calabria, Italy, in 1912. He first came through New York City before moving on to Montreal, Quebec, then to New Brunswick to work in the coal mines, before finally settling on Railway Street in Hamilton, Ontario, in 1917. (Note: Antonio, born in 1894, was thought to have immigrated straight to Canada in 1900, however U.S. immigration records were found in 2004 confirming his origin.) His father became associated with Calabrian compatriot and notorious bootlegger Rocco Perri, and later Guelph mobster Tony Sylvestro, working as a bootlegger who operated speakeasies. Tony Papalia was working as a driver for Perri's bootlegging operations at least by 1922, if not earlier. He was suspected in playing a role in the murder of Perri's wife Bessie Starkman in 1930. Papalia said of his father, in a 1986 interview with The Globe and Mail's Peter Moon, "I grew up in the '30s and you'd see a guy who couldn't read or write but who had a car and was putting food on the table. He was a bootlegger and you looked up to him."

Papalia's mother, Maria Rosa Italiano, also came from a Mafia family, the Italiano clan, who also participated in Perri's gang. Maria Rosa initially married Antonio's younger brother Giuseppe Papalia Jr., giving birth to two sons in Italy, however when Giuseppe died, she immigrated to Canada with her two sons in 1913 to live with Antonio, whom she married at some point, although it remains unclear when the wedding actually took place. Papalia's parents were not married at the time of his birth, which was a source of much shame for him. Moon stated, "John was a bastard. He was born out of wedlock. And he was always very self-conscious about it. You have to remember, he grew up in an era when it was a terrible thing to be conceived out of wedlock. Apparently it bothered him all his life and you had to very careful about calling John a 'bastard'." Johnny, the oldest brother to Frank, Rocco and Dominic Papalia, half-brothers Joseph and Angelo Papalia, brother-in-law Tony Pugliese, and associates, all worked in running his clubs and gambling operations.

Papalia attended St. Augustine Catholic School on Mulberry Street, dropping out in grade 8 after he suffered from a case of tuberculosis that put him in a sanitorium for several months. In 1986, Papalia stated that his biggest regret in life was never attending high school, saying of his life, "It's been an interesting one. But maybe I'd liked it to be different." As a teenager, Papalia was a member of a gang that staged burglaries in Hamilton, with the icehouse at the corner of Railway and Mulberry streets serving as their base. Papalia later described himself as a "wild kid" who was known for his womanizing, and who had contracted syphilis by the age of 19. Papalia had "a reputation for extreme violence" from the start of his criminal record as a teenager in the 1930s, and despite being only 5 feet 8 inches (1.73 m) with a slender build, was widely feared.

== Early career ==
In 1940, Papalia's father was arrested and sent to internment at Camp Petawawa as part of the Italian Canadian internment, as potentially dangerous enemy aliens with alleged connections to Benito Mussolini's fascist regime, causing his son to have a grudge against the Canadian government. Papalia later gave his father's internment as the reason as to why he did not serve in the military during World War II. When Antonio Papalia was interned, his profession was listed as "bootlegger." Antonio Papalia was released in 1941 after he convinced the authorities that he was not a Fascist. The authorities imposed conditions upon his release such as he stay out of Hamilton and regularly check in with the police. After his release, the Papalia family aligned with the Buffalo crime family, causing tensions with the still interned Perri who saw this as a betrayal. The Papalia family were still angry with Perri for his refusal to support the Italiano family and made an alliance with Stefano Magaddino against him. Johnny Papalia did not volunteer for overseas service (until November 1944, Canada only sent volunteers overseas to fight in World War II). He later claimed that his reputation for violence dated back to the war years when he was the subject of anti-Italian bullying and insults, leading Papalia to engage in violence for self-defense. In 1943, Papalia moved to Toronto, where he joined a gang that specialized in burglaries. During this period, Papalia started to work for Harvey Chernick, one of Toronto's biggest heroin dealers.

During his time in Toronto, Papalia served with a youth gang consisting of Paul Volpe, Pasquale Giodrano, Roy Pasquale, and Alberto Mignacchio. Many of the members of the gang such as Volpe remained long-time associates of Papalia. One who knew the gang stated, "They were a very tough bunch. They had a lot of balls. John himself talked tough, although he wasn't tough himself. He was smart enough, though, to make sure he was with people who were. John was the type of guy-even back then-that if he sensed fear in you, he tried to prey on it." On January 27, 1944, Papalia was arrested for failing to register for conscription for the defense of Canada as he was legally obliged to do in 1942 when he turned 18. Papalia's criminal record, health problems and his anger at the Canadian government for interning his father ensured that he was not conscripted.

On October 17, 1943, Perri was released from internment as Italy had signed an armistice with the Allies on September 3, 1943. It is believed Antonio and Johnny Papalia, along with Stefano Magaddino of the Buffalo crime family, played a role in Perri's disappearance in 1944 after Perri left members of his Mafia crew "slighted", although the case remains unsolved. On April 23, 1944, Perri vanished after going out for a walk and it is believed Papalia along with his father was involved in "the mysterious affair" of Perri's disappearance. In 1944, Papalia, Giondrano, and Pasquale robbed a Toronto-Dominion bank to provide themselves with venture capital for their criminal enterprises. When visiting Toronto, Papalia was known to joke that the particular branch of the Toronto-Dominion bank that he robbed in 1944 was "our bank."

Papalia was involved in petty crimes from a young age. Papalia was first arrested for burglary in 1945, but was given a short sentence. He was arrested again in 1949 and sentenced to two years in prison at the Guelph Reformatory for possession of narcotics, down from conspiracy to distribute narcotics. At his trial, Papalia claimed that he was not selling heroin as the prosecution claimed, but rather buying it as he maintained he needed heroin to treat the pain caused by the syphilis he contacted. The judge at the trial accepted this defense, and sympathetically advised Papalia to see a doctor after his release from prison, saying there were better ways of treating syphilis-induced pain. The fact that Papalia refused an offer of a plea bargain from the Crown under which he would serve a lesser sentence in exchange for testifying against his employers gave him a reputation in the underworld as someone who could be trusted to observe omertà (the code of silence).

When Papalia was released in 1951, he moved to Montreal for a stint, where he worked with Luigi Greco and New York City Bonanno crime family representative Carmine Galante in heroin trafficking. Vincenzo Cotroni, the boss of the Cotroni family of Montreal, had formed an alliance with Antoine d'Agostiono, a Corsican gangster based in Marseille, to smuggle heroin that was the prototype of the French Connection smuggling network and by 1956 it was estimated that 60 percent of the heroin in North America had arrived via Montreal. Cotroni had made contact with exiled Charles "Lucky" Luciano in 1951, saying he wanted access to the American market. Luciano had assigned Montreal to the Bonnano family. The Bonanno family in turn had sent Galante to Montreal to supervise the heroin smuggling. Galante who had been impressed by Papalia appointed him to serve as his agent for Ontario. Both Galante and Cotroni served as mentors for Papalia, whom modelled himself after them.

== "Made Man" ==
By the mid-1950s, Papalia was called back to Ontario by Magaddino and inducted as a made man into the Canadian arm of the Buffalo crime family and to be boss of the Papalia family in Ontario. It is not clear just precisely when Papalia became a made man, but it appears to have occurred sometime in 1955. Galante had forged an alliance with the Cotroni family, placing Quebec in the sphere of influence of the Bonanno family, and Magaddino, who wanted to keep southern Ontario in his sphere of influence, chose Papalia as one of his instruments for doing so. Magaddino informed Papalia that he was not to replace the older leaders in Ontario, but rather to work with them. Papalia was to serve as the enforcer boss who was to accept the advice of the older dons who were to play a role almost analogous to a consigliere. Papalia's territory covered Hamilton, Burlington, Oakville, St. Catharines, Welland, Niagara Falls and much of Toronto. Papalia also had influence into northern Ontario with his power extending into North Bay.

In 1954, Papalia was running a taxi company in Hamilton, which attracted police attention when one of the cab drivers, Tony Coposodi, was killed execution-style. By 1955, Papalia was known for wearing expensive suits and driving equally expensive automobiles, together with his womanizing habits. He liked to flash what he called "reds and browns" ($50 and $100 bills) as a sign of his wealth. Also in 1954, Papalia paid the tax arrears of the Porcupine Miners' Club of Timmins, a social group for the miners in northern Ontario founded in 1929 that had been out of business for some time. Papalia used the right that he gained with the social club charter to reopen the Porcupine Miners' Club in Hamilton in 1955, which served as a cover for an illegal gambling club that operated for the next two years. Papalia had the games rigged at his gambling club, having the dice loaded to favour certain numbers, having small dents placed in the cards to let the dealers know what the cards were and clips were placed under the gambling tables to remove cards with high values. In June 1955, while collecting money from various Montreal businesses together with the boxer Norm Yakubowitz, Papalia was the subject of an assassination attempt when someone opened fire on the duo. Yakubowitz was shot in the leg while Papalia was unharmed. He later shifted to Toronto extorting brokers and running gambling clubs. In 1955, Papalia organized in Toronto a bare-knuckle boxing match between Chard and James J. Parker, the former British Empire and Canadian heavyweight champion. Papalia, a boxing fan, together with 100 guests watched the last known bare knuckles boxing match in Canada, a fight that was notorious for its bloodiness and ended with Chard defeating Parker. Also in 1955, with assistance from Sylvestro, Papalia started opening charter gambling clubs in Hamilton and Toronto. Sylvestro's son-in-law Danny Gasbarrini, Papalia's brothers Frank, Rocco and Dominic, half-brothers Joseph and Angelo, brother-in-law Tony Pugliese, and associates Red LeBarre, Freddie Gabourie, Frank Marchildon and Jackie Weaver, all worked in running Papalia's clubs. After police raids, Papalia started working with James McDermott and Vincent Feeley, two major figures in gambling, in several clubs throughout southern Ontario. Together with Alberto Agueci of the Magaddino family, Papalia contacted Antoine Cordoliani and Joseph Césari, two Corsican leaders of Le Milieu, to buy high-quality heroin.

Papalia often seized control of various businesses by asking of the business owners the question "Johnny Papalia-does that mean anything to you?" When the answer was no, Papalia replied "Well, it's going to. I'm your new partner." Those who refused his offers of partnership were then beaten bloody by Papalia's thugs. Papalia especially liked to target stockbrokers who worked on Toronto's Bay Street, usually demanding that they pay him about $1,000 per week as "protection", supposedly against their enemies, but in fact for protection against being beaten by Papalia's crew. The Hamilton police chief, Leonard Lawrence, stated in a press conference that Papalia was the leading suspect in a number of beatings of businessmen, saying, "We have heard rumors that gangland beatings have taken place here recently, but when we question people who are said to be involved, nobody-including the victims-shows much interest in talking to us. It is typical of what happens when a syndicate tries to take over and organize crime." The protection payments served as seed money for Papalia's loan sharking business, which he called "shylocking." Papalia's principle enforcer was Howard "Baldy" Chard, a professional heavyweight boxer with a scarred face. Chard failed to win any professional titles, but during his time in Kingston Penitentiary, had been the prison boxing champion, a title that commanded both respect and fear on the streets.

In October 1958, Papalia made contact with Vinnie Mauro and Frank Caruso of the Genovese family, saying he wanted to smuggle heroin into the United States and needed someone to sell the heroin. Agueci went to Buffalo to see Magaddino and secured his support by paying him US$4,000 and a promise of the half the profits. In 1959, Papalia was the only Canadian who attended the meeting in New York that formally set up the French Connection smuggling network. Under the "French Connection", the Mafia brought heroin via France into North America. The "French Connection" heroin was grown in the poppy fields of Turkey and further afield in the "Golden Crescent" nations of Afghanistan, Pakistan and Iran or the "Golden Triangle" nations of Burma, Thailand and Laos. Joseph Valachi, who also attended the same meeting in New York, and later turned informer, testified that he knew Papalia as a capo (boss) who dominated southern Ontario under the authority of the Magaddino family of Buffalo.

== The Bluestein beating ==
The illegal gambling business in Toronto was very lucrative, dominated by Maxie Bluestein who kept the Mafia out of his pocket. Bluestein's Lakeview Club earned more than $13 million a year, but on March 21, 1961, at the Town Tavern in Toronto, Papalia met with Bluestein. It was understood that if Bluestein accepted a drink paid for by Papalia, it would mean submission to Papalia and he refused it, it would mean defiance; Bluestein refused the proffered drink. Bluestein refused to "merge" his operations with Papalia's and was beaten with brass knuckles, iron bars and fists as a result. The beating of Bluestein attracted much media attention, and the Toronto Star newspaper columnist Pierre Berton called the attack a "semi-execution" brazenly committed in public view. Berton turned the Bluestein beating into a cause célèbre, constantly demanding in his column that Papalia be brought to justice. Berton described the beating, "...as terrible a beating as it is possible to give a man without killing him...Iron bars with ropes attached to them for greater leverage rained down on Bluestein's head and across his forehead, eyes and cheekbones. His scalp was split seven or eight times. Brass knuckles were smashed into his eyes and a broken bottle was ground into his mouth. When Bluestein dropped to the floor, he was kicked in the face. His overcoat, torn and slashed, was literally drenched in his own blood... When I saw Bluestein, some 10 days after the affair, he looked like a piece of meat." Several of the witnesses to the Bluestein beating received threatening phone calls in the days after, warning them that it would be "healthier" for them to forget what they had just seen.

The 100 some witnesses to the beating were reluctant to come forward, but in May of that year Papalia turned himself in to police to take some heat off of the crime family, and he was sentenced in June to 18 months in prison for the assault. Berton's columns had their effect, causing massive public outrage and Papalia was ordered to turn himself in. As Papalia entered the Toronto police station, he displayed his hatred of journalists yelling insults at the assembled reporters, being quoted as saying "look at the dirty rats. The creeps. Those crummy, rotten cameras and all you crummy rotten guys." In 1986, Papalia expressed no remorse for the beating, saying "Bluestein was greedy, he wanted it all for himself." At the trial, which started on June 27, 1961, the witnesses were visibly terrified of Papalia, and several times, the presiding judge, Joseph Addison, accused several of the witnesses of perjury, saying he did not find their testimony about not being able to remember who had beaten Bluestein very credible. The trial ended with Papalia being found guilty of assault and Judge Addison sentenced Papalia to 18 months in prison. Addison noted that the witnesses had all taken oaths on the Bible to tell the truth before testifying, which led him to sourly note that the fear of Papalia seemed greater than the fear of God with the witnesses at this trial. While Bluestein kept control of the Toronto gambling market, he had paranoia and was later committed to a mental institution in 1973 after he had killed a friend, before later dying of a heart attack in 1984.

A profile of Papalia was published in Toronto Star Weekly Magazine by Peter Sypnowich under the title "He Wanted To Be Canada's Al Capone." However, Synowich focused on Papalia's sex addiction, calling him "a compulsive womanizer." Synowich wrote, "His relationships with women provide the best clue to his character. Papalia has an inbred need to steal other men's women. They serve as his trophies." Papalia's fondness for the wives and girlfriends of other men led him to engage in a succession of fights with the cuckolded men.

Later in 1961, Papalia demolished the family home and built a warehouse for his vending machine business, an all-cash business, to serve as the front for his criminal operations. The office for the Monarch Vending company was located at 20 Railroad Street and became Papalia's principal base, although officially Monarch Vending was owned and managed by his brother Frank Papalia together with Bruno Monaco. Through the company records listed Johnny only as an employee of his brother Frank, he was considered by almost everyone to be the real boss of Monarch Vending. Monarch Vending and its successor company Galaxy Vending had a monopoly on the vending machine business in Hamilton as no other vending machine company was willing to compete with Papalia. Monarch Vending was a profitable concern, making a daily profit of $12,000. Papalia began to hijack trucks to supply cigarettes for his vending machines. Papalia was also associated with F.M. Amusements, a pin-ball machine company and Beer Magic, which had a virtual monopoly on supplying beer dispensers for bars in Ontario for decades to come. As a loan shark, Papalia forced those who took loans from him to pay back $6 for every $5 they had borrowed with the interest compounding on a weekly basis, amounting to an annual 1,040 percent interest on the loans. Businessmen who were unable to repay their loans were forced to take on vending machines from Papalia on his terms while those who could still not repay their loans were further threatened "or worse."

== Extradition and sentencing ==
By the early 1960s, he earned his reputation from the "French Connection", which had then been responsible for supplying over 80 percent of America's heroin market between the 1960s and 1970s. He worked in this operation with the Sicilian Agueci brothers, Alberto and Vito, along with the vending machine businesses with Alberto, until he was brutally murdered by the Buffalo crime family in late 1961, and Vito jailed. On May 22, 1961, several people were indicted related to the "French Connection" from informants Salvatore Rinaldo and Matteo Palmeri.

In July 1961, Papalia was ordered to be extradited to the United States for his role in the smuggling ring. After his sentence for the Bluestein assault was commuted on March 15, 1962, he was finally extradited. As Papalia was marched by officers of the Royal Canadian Mounted Police to the plane that was to take him to the United States, he shouted at the assembled reporters, "I'm being kidnapped! Help me! They're taking me somewhere I don't want to go!" Papalia's behaviour was such that he was refused admission to the airplane, and instead the RCMP were forced to drive him to the U.S. border at Fort Erie with Papalia vomiting in the backseat to be handed over to the agents of the federal Bureau of Narcotics. The "French Connection" case was described by Robert F. Kennedy, the attorney-general of the United States, as "the deepest penetration ever made in the illegal international trafficking of drugs." While waiting trial in New York's West Street jail, Papalia was known as "Canadian John" and learned how to play chess. Papalia came to be fascinated with chess and therefore often likened himself to a chess master who always carefully pondered his every move. He was regarded as a rude, foul-mouthed prisoner with another Canadian prisoner, James Roxburgh saying, "He was anything but a gentleman. I knew some other people that knew him, acquaintances of Carmine Galante and those guys were class acts in comparison." While waiting his trial, he coughed up blood due to the tuberculosis he contracted as a child.

On March 4, 1963, Papalia pleaded guilty just as his trial was about to begin. On March 11, 1963, Papalia was sentenced to 10 years in prison. His conviction in New York generated massive press coverage in Canada. One Hamilton policeman told a reporter from The Toronto Star, "In the 15 years I've known him, I've never known him to engage in a legal activity. He is a cop-hater, a primitive. He got where he is through fear. He's hard, hard, hard." Another Hamilton policeman told the same reporter, "A real deadly man who would crush you without thinking. No regard for anyone or anything, neither for the criminal laws nor the laws of the underworld." Papalia later sought to reverse his conviction, claiming that he was of unsound mind when he made the guilty plea due to the anti-tuberculosis drugs he was taking and wanted a new trial, taking his case all the way to the Supreme Court of the United States, which refused to hear his appeal on October 12, 1964. Had he been granted a new trial, Papalia then planned to ask to have the charges dismissed under the grounds that his guilty plea and the resultant negative publicity made it impossible to find an impartial jury to hear his case. The lawyers for the Department of Justice noted that Papalia had explicitly stated he was of sound mind when he made his guilty plea and there was no medical evidence to support his claims of drug-induced mental incompetence at the time of his guilty plea. Due to the indictment, Magaddino promoted Santo Scibetta to leader of the Buffalo family's Ontario branch, replacing Papalia.

In 1963, Papalia was also convicted in absentia in Italy of gangsterism and sentenced to 10 years in prison. It was for this reason that Papalia never visited Italy. Upon his return to Canada from his prison term in the United States, the Canadian authorities refused the extradition request from Italy under the grounds that Papalia was a Canadian citizen and that the offence of "Mafia associations" did not exist in the Criminal Code of Canada. Papalia worked closely with the Italian branch of his 'ndrina (clan). There is also an Australian branch of the Papalia family based in Griffith, but the precise relationship, if any, between the Australian and Canadian Papalias beyond blood ties remains unclear. Two of Papalia's Australian cousins were murdered.

== Return to Hamilton ==
On January 25, 1968, after serving less than half the sentence, he was released from a United States penitentiary in Lewisburg, Pennsylvania and sent back to Canada. His father had died on May 14, 1964, while Papalia was in jail, and his mother later died on July 27, 1970. Giacomo Luppino and Santo Scibetta also answered to Magaddino while Papalia was imprisoned. Papalia's homecoming to Hamilton was a lavish affair as Railway Street was filled up with a vast assortment of parked Lincolns and Cadillacs as a number of the underworld figures of southern Ontario arrived to pay their respects. Much to Papalia's annoyance, some of his interests in Toronto were handed over by the Magaddinos to Volpe. Papalia met with Luppino to ask that his interests in Toronto be returned, a request that was refused, but Luppino did say that there was still work for Papalia to do in Toronto. At a meeting with Luppino in November 1968, Papalia expressed some uncertainty as to whom the Cotroni family of Montreal answered to, saying it was either the Magaddino family or the Bonanno family, leading to Luppino to answer "We are still under the Commission."

On June 6, 1969, Papalia visited Toronto to meet with Luppino. On the following day, the bullet-ridden body of Filippo Vendemini was found in the parking lot behind his shoe store on Bloor Street. Vendemini's widow, Giuseppina, told the police that her husband was frequently on the phone with a man she only knew as Vincenzo. Using the phone records, the police discovered that Vincenzo was Vincenzo Sicari, the owner of a pizzeria in Montreal who often visited Toronto. Sicari stated to the police that on the day of the murder, he had driven Vendemini to Hamilton to see an unnamed mutual friend and then drove Vendemini to the Toronto airport; he denied knowing anything about the murder. On July 28, 1969, Papalia again returned to Toronto to meet with Luppino, and on the same day, the bullet-ridden body of Sicari was found in Toronto. The way that murders in Toronto always seemed to occur at the same time that Papalia met with Luppino led the police to suspect that Papalia was the killer. It was around this time that Papalia started to be known in the underworld as "the Enforcer."

On June 4, 1970, a NDP MPP, Morton Shulman, gave a speech at Queen's Park, that detailed the close friendship between Papalia and a locally prominent Oakville businessman with a long criminal record, Clinton Duke as well as with the commissioner of the Ontario Provincial Police Eric Silk. The speech caused a media storm in Ontario. Papalia behaved with characteristic insolence when interviewed by two police officers, giving flippant answers to questions about his relationship with Duke. At a public inquiry to examine Shulman's allegations, Papalia admitted that Duke was a long-standing friend of his, but denied corrupting the police, claiming to be unaware that Duke was a close friend of Silk's. The photographs of Papalia entering the Old City Hall of Toronto to testify at the inquiry dressed in a trench coat and a fedora while smoking a cigarette made the frontpages of the Canadian newspapers. The inquiry commissioner found no evidence that Papalia had corrupted Silk via Duke, but did criticize Silk for associating with Duke, whom he stated was an unsavory figure.

In August 1970, Papalia attended a crime summit in Acapulco representing the Magaddino family to meet with gangsters from Canada, the United States, France, and Mexico to discuss plans to take over the soon to be legalized casino industry in Quebec. The chairman of the Acapulco summit was Meyer Lansky who represented "the Commission" of New York while Vic Cotroni, Paolo Violi and Frank Cotroni were present to represent the Cotroni family. The various gangsters who attended the summit numbered at least 100 and it was intended to use the Quebec casinos to engage in money laundering on a colossal scale. French gangsters of Le Milieu attended the summit as it was planned to use the casinos to launder the profits from the French Connection smuggling network. The plans turned out to be moot when the Quebec premier, Robert Bourassa, later dropped his plans to legalize casinos as his government took a tough law-and-order stance in response to the FLQ. The allegation made by the FLQ in its manifesto of October 8, 1970, that was read out on national television and radio in both French and English following the kidnapping of the British trade commissioner James Cross on October 5 that Bourassa was working for "the election riggers Simard-Cotroni" caused Bourassa to change his policies that were perceived to be friendly towards organized crime. Papalia remained close to American gangsters whom he often met in the resort towns of Turkey Point and Port Rowan on the shores of Lake Erie. In August 1971, at a meeting in Toronto, Luppino shifted control of the construction unions in Toronto from Papalia to Volpe, which was a major blow to Papalia's ego. In August 1971, Papalia assaulted a court employee, Len Joy, who arrived at the Monarch Vending office to give him a summons. The incident led to Papalia being charged with assault, but a month later, in September 1971 the assault charges were dropped when Joy accepted a written apology from Papalia who stated he "been under a great deal of pressure at the time" and refused to testify against him.

In 1972, Papalia was summoned to a meeting in Toronto by Michele Racco to discuss the situation with his son Domenic Racco who was facing three counts of attempted murder after he lost his temper and impulsively shot three men whom he felt had insulted him. The meeting was held in Italian, a language that Papalia could speak competently, albeit he was "not fluent in the delicacies of the language." However, inviting Papalia to the meeting to discuss a problem within the Racco family was a sign of great respect, showing that Racco held him in high esteem. Despite their efforts, Domenic Racco was convicted of three counts of attempted murder. Racco asked Papalia to look after his son after his death, which was a mark of great honor within the Mafia subculture. Papalia took this duty seriously, attempting to serve as a surrogate father to Domenic Racco and tried to discourage him, albeit unsuccessfully, from abusing drugs. In 1974, Papalia attended the murder trial of Peter Demeter in Toronto, which was already a media circus and his presence in the courtroom caused a "media sensation" as there was much speculation about why he was attending a trial in which the Papalia family was apparently not involved in.

In 1971, Stanley Bader, a disreputable Toronto stockbroker with a talent for swindling his investors went into business with Sheldon "Sonny" Swartz, who was the son of a Papalia family associate. In 1973, Bader swindled a group of Montreal investors, which Swartz mentioned to Papalia. Papalia devised a plan under which Swartz would tell Bader that the investors were from the Cotroni family, and that Papalia would volunteer to "return" the stolen money to Montreal in exchange for sparing Bader's life. On August 26, 1973, Swartz told Bader that the defrauded investors were from the Cotroni family who were planning to "maim" him, but that Papalia had stepped in to save him by agreeing to take $300,000 to Montreal. Bader believed these claims, saying he had noticed "strange" cars parked outside of his house at night, whom he felt were from Montreal, and agreed to hand over the money to Papalia.

The next year, Bader mentioned to a friend from the Montreal underworld about what had happened to him in August 1973, who in turn passed along the news to the Cotroni family. In 1974, Montreal mobsters Vincenzo Cotroni and Paolo Violi were overheard on a police wiretap threatening to kill Papalia and demanding $150,000 after he used their names in the $300,000 extortion of Toronto business man Stanley Bader without notifying or cutting them in on the score. On April 30, 1974, Papalia went to Montreal, where at the Reggio Bar Cotroni told him, "I don't want chicken feed. He used our name. Half." Violi agreed, saying, "That's it. He got to his person because he used our name. Not because he used his name. The guy was afraid of us and he paid. People who use our name pay." Cotroni did not believe Papalia's claims of ignorance, telling him, "Let's hope not because, eh, we'll kill you." Papalia responded with a humility and meekness that was unusual for him as he replied, "I know you'll kill me, Vic. I believe you'll kill me." Inspector Ron Sandelli of the Toronto police stated, "This was a period in John's life when John was afraid." During the trial, Papalia who was angry that it was the policeman Robert Ménard who recorded him talking in the Reggio Bar twice challenged Mario Latraverse, the chief of the Montreal police's anti-gang squad, to a fight in the men's washroom in the courthouse. Papalia backed down both times after Latraverse proved willing to take him up on his challenges. After the second incident, Cotroni told Latraverse in French, "Monsieur Latraverse, I just found out what happened. Don't worry about it. I'll talk to him. I know you're a gentleman and he's not going to treat you like that". Cotroni kept his word, and Papalia ceased trying to provoke fights with Latraverse.

Bader testified against them, and the three were convicted of extortion in 1975 and sentenced to six years in prison. Violi and Cotroni got their sentences appealed to just six months, but Papalia's was rejected; he served four of the years. Justice Peter Wright said of the three men convicted, "The evidence in his case is grim and appalling. It exposes a world of big money grabbed and held by the exercise of brute power. You did not fear the laws of this country and you have chosen to live their lives in a sub-strata of society that operates beyond the rule of law." The fact that Cotroni had threatened to kill Papalia if he went to prison caused him much alarm, and it came as a considerable relief to him in May 1977 when Violi and Cotroni were acquitted on most of the charges on an appeal. After his release from prison, Papalia went to his cottage at Lake Temagami in northern Ontario.

In 1979, Monarch Vending was sold to Allind Distributors of Toronto while a non-competition agreement was signed with Frank Papalia and Monaco, stating the two were not to compete with Monarch Vending in the greater Toronto area for the next five years. After the sale, two of Papalia's other brothers, Rocco and Dominic, promptly set up a new company, Galaxy Vending, whose office was located at the Monarch Vending's old office at 20 Railroad Street. Rick Page, the manager of Allind Distributors, was shocked to discover the aggressive way that Galaxy Vending went about taking away his customers with Monarch Vending machines often being found dumped in back alleys. At a press conference, Page answered the question if he was naïve with the remark, "Yes, we knew the connotations, yes, we were naïve. We thought we had a noncompetition agreement. I think it is unethical as hell."

In 1982, after Bader had moved south to Miami, he was sprayed with bullets when answering his front door. Papalia has been linked with his death, as well as the 1983 murder of Volpe, but no charges were laid. In 1977, Papalia was featured in the CBC television documentary, Connections, about Mafia influence on the Canadian economy. Papalia refused to be interviewed, exploding in rage and swearing at a CBC television crew that tried to interview him on the streets, believing that this would render the footage un-airable. The footage was aired anyhow with the four-words being beeped out, which made Papalia appear crude and vulgar on national television. Papalia told the camera crew, "You fucking degenerate motherfucker! Drop the camera and come with me alone, you cocksucker bastard! I'll tear your fucking eyes out of your head, you degenerate, you, you...go suck your mother's cunt, you cocksucker! Cocksucker!" Papalia then kicked the camera man.

== The "Godfather" of Hamilton ==
As a boss, Papalia was feared rather than loved; one of his associates stated, "We had to respect him because of his role. But he got on everybody's nerves." Papalia had a proprietary attitude towards the wives and mistresses of his men, taking the viewpoint that it was his right as a boss to sleep with the girlfriends and wives of his men, which made him unpopular. He was a tyrannical boss who had no tolerance for failure, and made a point of taunting and punishing his men for any mistake, no matter how minor. As Papalia grew more wealthy and powerful, he came to display a sultanistic attitude alongside his megalomania. In 1975, Papalia founded the Gold Key Club nightclub in Hamilton. Only members and their guests who knew the password were allowed entry. Detective Sergeant John Gordon Harris of the Hamilton police said, "There wasn't actually any gold key. They used a password that changed from time to time, just like in gangster movies." The Gold Key Club became Papalia's principal base for entertaining visitors as the large, illuminated neon yellow key on the front of the club became a symbol of his power in Hamilton. By the 1980s, Papalia's firms were the largest suppliers of beer dispensers for bars in Ontario while leasing out at least 2,000 vending and pinball machines.

Papalia came to play a "Godfather" role in the Italian Canadian community, serving as a community mediator as Papalia's biographer Adrien Humphreys noted, "There are hundreds of people throughout Hamilton who will attest to Johnny's helping hand." A police officer said, "John Papalia would like nothing better than to walk into a bar and have everyone in the room bow their head in respect." A man who knew him stated, "John was revered on Railroad Street. I was standing there talking with John and this old Italian guy was walking by and the old guy bows his head to John and says, 'Ah comapare [an Italian expression meaning "godfather"]. He was very good to all the kids and very good to all the people who lived in the area. If a guy needed a few bucks, John would give him a job taking the garbage out, or painting something, or whatever needed to be done. He would look after them."

In January 1981, Papalia married Janetta Hayes in a private ceremony; they separated in 1983. In July 1983, Réal Simard moved to Ontario from Montreal where he met with Papalia in Hamilton on behalf of Frank Cotroni. At a meeting at Hanrahan's strip bar in Hamilton, Papalia told Simard, "Maybe you have friends? In Montreal, for instance?... Maybe we have friends in common, like F.C. [Frank Cotroni]" Simard replied that F.C is "my friend", leading Papalia to ask "Can you get in touch with him? Now?" Simard phoned Cotroni in Montreal and then handed the phone over to Papalia, who was told that Simard was his representative and he was to work with him. The meeting was tense as Papalia had brought along three bodyguards. Simard seized the Ontario market, bringing Quebec strippers to Toronto clubs, where he allowed Papalia to put his pinball machines in his clubs. The strippers from Quebec were the first to engage in nude table dancing in Ontario, which made them very popular. Despite their first meeting, Papalia managed to get along well with Simard, who spoke fluent English and was always respectful towards him. During a visit to Montreal, Cotroni asked Simard if Papalia was being polite. Cotroni's right-hand man, Claude Faber, told Simard, "If he makes any trouble, kill the fucker — he's old enough to die." In contrast to Simard, Papalia hated Eddie Melo, a boxer turned mob enforcer for the Cotroni family, who had replaced Simard as the Cotroni family's supervisor for the Toronto area. Papalia is reported to have told Cotroni, "Put a leash on Melo or I'll kill him."

The murder of Volpe in November 1983, together with the fact that Luppino had suffered mental decline in his old age, forced the Magaddinos to put Papalia in charge of southern Ontario again. The police considered Papalia to be one of the prime suspects behind Volpe's murder. The journalists Peter Edwards and Antonio Nicaso, in their 1993 book Deadly Silence, accused Papalia of being the one responsible for Volpe's murder. Papalia read Deadly Silence and later briefly met Nicaso; the latter found it significant that Papalia did not actually deny the accusation about Volpe's murder. Despite the unflattering picture of him in Deadly Silence, Papalia never sued Edwards and Nicaso for libel. Ron Sandelli, a staff inspector with the Toronto police and a Mafia specialist said in 1986 about Papalia's claims to have never killed anyone, "He is probably telling the truth in a stretched way. He may never have pulled the trigger himself, but for him to say he never killed anybody when he directed other people to do it, I find hard to believe.""

Papalia became more cautious in his last years as he greatly feared returning to prison. Papalia refused to break his parole conditions that he was not to leave Hamilton. Despite his fondness for Chinese food, Papalia refused to go to Lee's Garden, his favourite Chinese restaurant, which was located just outside of Hamilton in Burlington, instead patiently waiting in his car for someone to pick up the food he ordered. Papalia always had his meetings with his men on the street, talking vaguely in words that were always open to interpretation while engaging in hand gestures to convey his real meaning. The police placed bugs on the parking meters on Railroad Street, hoping to catch Papalia saying something incriminating as he held his meetings while walking up and down the street. Sandelli stated, "You can't infiltrate Johnny Papalia. It would take you forever to infiltrate somebody like that to the extent that you would be a personal trust to him, that he would take you as one of his boys to tell you to do things for him. It wasn't for a lack of trying, he was just too smart. I tell you, this guy was like a fox."

Several times, the police were able to pressure criminals to wear wires while visiting Papalia at his office on Railroad Street, but he never said anything that would have allowed the police to lay charges. One criminal who wore a wire at a meeting with Papalia later stated in an interview with Humphreys:, "It would have been a horrendous situation if he had found the wire. To John, it would have been the fact that he was taken for a fool, which he couldn't handle; that he had trusted somebody that he couldn't. No question, I would have had to move. John would have had me hit. Killed. It would be such an insult to him that he put me in confidence, that he let me know what he was trying to do. He would looked like a complete fool. To save face he would had to order a hit on me, he would had no choice." Papalia greatly resented the police surveillance, and was once overheard by a police bug complaining about the "lady Mountie" who had been assigned to follow him, saying, "What's the world coming to? I don't mind these cops following me, but when I have bits and piece of me out and there are girls following me, there is no honor in that."

In 1984, Papalia attempted to redevelop an entire city block he owned in Hamilton to put up a luxury hotel, which was frustrated by the city of Hamilton, which refused the necessary permits to redevelop the block. Papalia's real estate venture had been foiled in an OPP operation overseen by Al Robinson that saw the police informer Marvin Elkind visit Papalia at the Galaxy Vending office on July 20, 1983, with an offer to provide false mortgages, an offer that Papalia accepted. Elkind did not record enough incriminating statements for the police to lay charges as Papalia was always careful with his words, but Robinson leaked to the media in October 1983 that Papalia had taken out mortgages worth $11.7 million on properties worth only $2 million. In the 1980s, Papalia tried to seize control of the illegal gambling houses in Toronto's Greektown on the Danforth, sending his right-hand man Carmen Barillaro to lead a crew to beat up patrons and rob the gambling houses that refused to pay the extortion. In December 1985, several of Papalia's associates were charged with extortion in Greektown. The police did not charge Papalia for his role in the Greektown case out of the fear that he might be acquitted, which would add to the already almost legendary mystique that he had by the 1980s. Besides Barillaro, Papalia's other principal lieutenant was Enio Mora. Mora ran the Papalia family's operations in the greater Toronto area while Barillaro ran the operations in the Niagara Peninsula. Mora was known for his practice of dosing those behind in loans to Papalia with gasoline and threatening to burn them alive in order for them to pay up. Barillaro was considered to be the more important of the two as the geographical proximity of the Niagara peninsula to the U.S. border was better situated for drugs to be smuggled into Canada. Another of Papalia's lieutenants was a man known as "Pennybender", whose special talent was to place a penny between his teeth while bending it with his hand, which was considered to be a terrifying act by those who saw it, and inspired many people to give in to Papalia's demands. One Toronto businessman, Donald Pressey, paid Papalia $10,000 after "Pennybender" threatened him and said he was working on behalf on the Montreal underground. In response to an appeal for help, Papalia told Pressey just to give him $10,000 and he would protect him. It was only later that Pressey learned that "Pennybender" was working of Papalia.

In October 1985, Papalia was one of the principal suspects in the disappearance of Louis Iannuzzelli, a prominent businessman in Niagara Falls who vanished after angering Papalia by operating a loansharking business in what Papalia saw as his turf. Iannuzzelli, the owner of the House of Frankenstein Wax Museum, was a loanshark who was under the protection of Dominic Longo. When Longo died, Iannuzzeli disappeared three days later. A police officer stated in 1986, "He [Iannuzzelli] didn't commit suicide. He was killed. And with him gone, there's no competition for John [Papalia] in Niagara Falls." The police suspect that Barillaro was involved in Iannuzzelli's presumed murder.

Regarding the Greektown case, Papalia said in 1986, "Yeah, I know the people they charged — they're friends of mine. But that doesn't mean I was involved; I wasn't, because I wouldn't have anything to do with Greeks — I don't like them, I don't like their restaurants, I don't like their food." In the same interview with Peter Moon of The Globe & Mail, Papalia listed his hobbies as watching boxing, baseball, American football and old films as he could not stand "this porno stuff" as he labelled modern films. He listed jazz as his favourite genre of music. Papalia told Moon that he had stopped taking vacations in Mexico because there was "too much crime" in that nation, and now preferred the West Indies. Papalia said about his occupation, "I go into a bar and I tell them my name and I intimidate people into taking our equipment. That's what the police tell you, isn't it? Listen, I'm lucky to have a couple of good brothers who look after me." About his reputation for violence, Papalia said he had "a short fuse" and added, "Hey, we all lose our temper sometime, don't we?" About why he was seen with gangsters so often, Papalia replied, "You go to Italian weddings, you meet people. I go to lots of Italian weddings." Papalia admitted, however, "I did shylocking and bookmaking, but was back in the fifties. For a guy who been doing so much in this country, the police haven't been able to come up with anything on me. They got nothing better to do than run around following me all the time at taxpayers' expense."

Papalia was known for his hatred of outlaw bikers, whom he found to be intolerably stupid and crude, and, in the 1980s and '90s, made it very clear that he did not want a Hells Angels chapter in Hamilton. Papalia was prepared to grudgingly tolerate other outlaw biker clubs such as the Outlaws and Satan's Choice, but drew a line at the Hells Angels. The Quebec biker war confirmed his prejudices as he found the Angels to be too violent and too vulgar for his liking. Another reason was his opposition to the Rizzuto family. The elite Nomad chapter of the Hells Angels based in Montreal purchased their cocaine from the Rizzuto family, and in return sold the cocaine to the other Hells Angels chapters. Papalia was especially opposed to the Hells Angels moving into Ontario because of their close alliance with the Rizzuto family as he felt that any Hells Angels chapters in Ontario would in effect be Rizzuto family chapters. Walter Stadnick, a Hamilton native and Hells Angel in charge of expanding them into Ontario, was forced to keep a low profile in his hometown as long as Papalia lived. The crime expert Jerry Langton wrote, "Well into the '90s, Papalia was the undisputed Godfather in Hamilton, especially after Luppino died in 1987. He owned an entire city block among his vast real estate holdings. His companies were the biggest vending-machine and liquor-dispensing equipment firms in Canada. He made millions and laughed about it in the media." In 1994, Papalia began suffering from health problems, and spent most of his time either at his penthouse apartment on Market Street or his office at the Galaxy Vending company across the street.

In the 1990s, Mora borrowed $7.2 million from Montreal mob boss Vito Rizzuto and gave the bulk of the money to Papalia to open an upscale restaurant and nightclub in Toronto. After the Rizzuto crime family were not repaid, in September 1996, Mora was shot in the head four times at a Vaughan farm; Giacinto Arcuri was arrested and charged with Mora's murder, but was acquitted for lack of evidence.

== Death ==
In April 1997, Pasquale "Fat Pat" Musitano, the boss of the Musitano family, met with Gaetano "Guy" Panepinto, the Toronto agent of Montreal's Rizzuto family, in Niagara Falls. Musitano was unhappy with the way that his family was subordinate to the Papalia family, which in turn was the Canadian branch of the Magaddino family. Both Papalia and his right-hand man Barillaro were "made men" in the Magaddino family, and Musitano needed the "protection" of a more powerful family to avoid retaliation from the Buffalo family should either be killed. Musitano wanted an alignment with the Rizzuto family, which in turn was looking to expand into Ontario.

Papalia was fatally shot in the head on May 31, 1997, at the age of 73 in the parking lot of 20 Railway Street outside his vending machine business, Galaxy Vending, in Hamilton. The hitman Kenneth Murdock claimed that he had been ordered to kill Papalia by Angelo and Pat Musitano of the Musitano crime family who owed $250,000 in bookmaking debts to Papalia. Murdock went to Galaxy Vending to meet with Papalia, whom he had met several times before, to speak in the parking lot of Galaxy Vending under the false pretense of seeking his help to get money back from the Musitanos. After Papalia refused to get involved, he turned his back, and Murdock pulled out his handgun and shot him. Papalia was brought to Hamilton General Hospital where he was pronounced dead.

Amid controversy, Papalia was refused a full Funeral Mass by the Diocese of Hamilton due to having been a career criminal. He was buried at Holy Sepulchre Cemetery, in a family plot, in Burlington.

=== Aftermath and legacy ===
Murdock also killed Papalia's right-hand man Carmen Barillaro two months after he killed Papalia. In November 1998, Murdock pleaded guilty to three counts of second degree murder and was sentenced to life imprisonment, and he named Pat and Angelo as the men who had ordered the murders; he was released on parole after serving 13 years. In February 2000, the brothers were sentenced to 10 years for conspiracy to commit murder in the murder of Barillaro in a plea bargain arrangement. No conviction was obtained in relation to the murder of Papalia. In October 2006, the Musitano brothers were both released from prison.

Papalia's brother Frank, the former underboss of the family, who would have been the heir to the operation, decided not to retaliate; instead, he retired and lived inconspicuously. He died of natural causes in April 2014, at the age of 83. Peter Edwards and Antonio Nicaso wrote that with the murders of Mora, Papalia and Barillaro over a ten-month period "created more space" for the Rizzuto family, which was then able to dominate Ontario. The journalists André Cédilot and André Noël described the Musitano brothers as merely proxies for Vito Rizzuto, the boss of the Rizzuto family, who saw Papalia, who was loyal to the Magaddino family, as an obstacle for his plans to dominate Ontario. On October 22 and 23, 1997, Rizzuto met twice in a Hamilton restaurant with his Toronto agent Gaetano "Guy" Panepinto and Pasquale "Fat Pat" Musitano. Rizzuto appointed Musitano as one of his Ontario lieutenants to work under the authority of Panepinto.

Crime expert Jerry Langton called Papalia the most important Ontario Mafioso of his generation. Langton noted Papalia had a marked distaste for outlaw bikers and, in a sign of his power, Walter Stadnick, the former president of Hells Angels Canada, had trouble establishing the Angels in Ontario while Papalia was alive. Langton stated, "It's hard for people to understand now just how powerful Johnny Pops was. He was basically the only Canadian Mafia figure who could sit at the table with the top guys in New York. He was part of the French connection; he ruled a big swath of Canada, particularly Southern Ontario, for a very long time. After the Mafia imploded in less than a year, there was no one to oppose the bikers and they came rushing in." In a sign of the new power structure, one of Papalia's leading lieutenants, Gerald Ward of Welland, who had served as the Papalia family's principal drug dealer in the Niagara Peninsula, defected over to the Hells Angels after his murder. One police officer, Shawn Clarkson, of the Niagara Falls Police Department, stated: "There was nobody to stand up to the Hells Angels the way Barillaro or Papalia would have. Papalia, even though he was 73 when he died, he wouldn't have put up with that."
