= Carmen Barillaro =

Canadian gangster (1944–1997)

- Born: 24 July 1944; Italy
- Died: 23 July 1997 (aged 52); Niagara Falls, Ontario, Canada
- Occupation: Mobster
- Allegiance: Papalia crime family Buffalo crime family
- Convictions: Conspiracy to import heroin (1978); Conspiracy to commit murder (1989)
- Penalty: 2 years' imprisonment (1978); 3 years' imprisonment (1989)

Carmen Barillaro (24 July 1944 – 23 July 1997) was an Italian-Canadian mobster who served as the right-hand man to Johnny Papalia of the Papalia crime family based in Hamilton, Ontario. Barillaro was briefly the boss of the Papalia family in 1997 with his reign being ended by his murder.

== Criminal career ==
=== "Made man" ===
Barillaro was born in Italy and immigrated to Canada with parents at the age of nine. He grew up in Niagara Falls, and joined the Papalia family. In 1931, when the Commission was established, dividing up North America into territories controlled by various Mafia families, much of southern Ontario was assigned to the Magaddino family of Buffalo, New York, to whom the Papalia family of Hamilton were ultimately responsible to. Barillaro became a "made man" in the Magaddino family of Buffalo.

In 1978, Barillaro was convicted of conspiracy to import heroin and sentenced to two years in prison. Released on parole in 1979, he was convicted of trying to sell three pounds of heroin to an undercover police officer in 1980, causing him to spend the next three years in prison. During his time in prison, Barillaro had bulked up by working out, and upon his release Papalia employed him to extort money from illegal gambling houses in Toronto's Greektown in the Pape-Danforth area. Considered to be a terrifying figure, Barillaro together with other muscular Mafiosi would raid gambling houses that refused to pay protection money to Papalia to intimidate and rob the gamblers.

=== The Iannuzzelli disappearance ===
Louis Iannuzzelli was a prominent businessman in Niagara Falls, Ontario who owned the House of Frankenstein Wax Museum and who started to engage in loansharking in the Niagara Peninsula, which Papalia considered to be his territory. However, Iannuzzelli had a protector in the form of Dominic Longo, an elderly Mafiosi who worked alongside Antonio Papalia, the father of Johnny, who ordered Johnny to accept Iannuzzelli operations. Papalia was respectful of his elders and accepted Longo's orders. Longo died in October 1985, and three days later, Iannuzzelli disappeared without trace, never to be seen or heard from again. Barillaro was never charged, but remains the prime suspect in the presumed murder of Iannuzzelli. In an interview with the journalist Peter Moon of The Globe and Mail in December 1986, Papalia denied having anything to do with Iannuzzelli's presumed murder, but did express much hatred of Iannuzzelli, whom he suggested maliciously was "depressed" because of his failures in life and had committed suicide. One police officer told Moon: "I'm sure he [Iannuzzelli] was depressed. You'd be depressed too if you thought Johnny Pops was mad at you for some reason. He didn't commit suicide. And with him gone, there's no competition for John in Niagara Falls". One police officer told the journalist Adrien Humphreys that it was universally accepted that Barillaro had killed Iannuzzelli for Papalia, but there was insufficient evidence to charge him with first-degree murder.

=== Underboss ===
In December 1985, Barillaro was arrested and charged with extortion of the gambling houses in Greektown as part of Operation Outhouse, a crackdown by the Ontario Provincial Police (OPP) on the Papalia family. The police believed that Barllaro was acting on Papalia's orders during his raids on the gambling houses of Greektown, but Papalia was not charged because it was thought likely that he would be acquitted in court, which would add to his mystique as Papalia had a near-legendary reputation by the 1980s. Instead, the police contented themselves with charging Barillaro, Enio Mora and several others for the brutal raids that saw numerous patrons beaten up and the ear of one gambling house owner sliced up with a knife. Ultimately, the Crown dropped the charges, and Barillaro never went to trial. On 24 December 1986, Barillaro filed for bankruptcy, claiming he had no assets and his only source of income was his weekly salary of $245 at Murphy's Restaurant, while at the same time he allowed a friend to use his credit card as much as he wanted, saying that the costs of paying off the credit card bill was not an issue for him.

To launder money for the Papalia family, Barillaro opened up a restaurant-bar in Niagara Falls. Barillaro was an exacting and tyrannical manager who beat up a cook who tried to defrost a chicken with cold water instead of a microwave as he had ordered. He owned the restaurant-bar via a convoluted ownership structure that was meant to pass himself off as a silent partner as his criminal record made him ineligible to have a liquor license in Ontario. In 1989, Sergeant Reginald King of the Royal Canadian Mounted Police (RCMP) made a listing of all 275 Mafiosi in Ontario in order of importance. King placed Papalia as number one and Barillaro as number seven. By the late 1980s, Barillaro was in charge of the Papalia family's operations in the Niagara peninsula area while Enio Mora was in charge of the Papalia family's operations in the Toronto area.

In 1987, Barillaro hired a woman, Faye Fontaine, to serve as an assassin, saying he wanted Roy Caja, a drug dealer who had once belonged to the Outlaws biker gang, killed for not paying a drug debt. Fontaine ultimately chose not to serve as a hitwoman, and instead turned police informer. On 24 January 1989, Barillaro was sentenced to three years in prison for conspiracy to commit murder. Barillaro remained active as a criminal behind bars. In 1991, he told the police informer Marvin Elkind while he was wearing a wire that the boxer Eddie Melo was working for him as an enforcer. In a police operation overseen by Al Robinson, Elkind was introduced to Barillaro in 1992 at the Carin Croft Hotel to discuss buying counterfeit passports, but Elkind while wearing a wire instead recorded him discussing drug deals. Shortly after his release, Barillaro was charged in May 1992 with conspiracy to import several kilograms of cocaine and 900 kilograms of marijuana from the United States. The drug shipment was estimated to be worth $3 million Canadian dollars. Barillaro ended up pleading guilty to conspiracy to import cocaine and was fined $10,000. On 5 April 1993, Robinson met with Barrillaro to warn him not to harm Elkind, saying that Elkind was not only his agent, but also his friend, and that as a policeman he had more power than Barillaro did. Barillaro and his crew specialized in loan-sharking, drug smuggling, and bookmaking.

Barillaro was married with two daughters and always had dinner with his brother every Sunday. He was a devout Catholic who was a close friend of his priest, Father Malachy Smith, who called him a model family man. Barillaro was considered to be a friendly man by his neighbours who always greeted others on the street and loved to barbeque in his backyard with his family.

Mora borrowed $7.2 million from Vito Rizzuto of Montreal's Rizzuto family and gave the majority of the money to Papalia and Barillaro, who used some of it to open nightclubs and restaurants while the rest just vanished. Neither Papalia nor Barillaro were interested in repaying the loan as the police recorded Barillaro saying on his phone "They can't touch us". The Canadian journalists André Cédilot and André Noël wrote that this was a "major mistake" as Rizzuto decided to wipe out the Papalia family's leaders. On 11 September 1996, Mora was murdered getting into his car in Vaughan. Rizzuto formed an alliance with the Musitano crime family of Hamilton, who had their own reasons for wanting to eliminate the Papalia family.

== Murder ==
On 31 May 1997, Papalia was fatally shot in the head in the parking lot of 20 Railway Street outside his vending machine business in Hamilton. The hitman Kenneth Murdock claimed that he had been ordered to kill Papalia by Angelo and Pat Musitano of the Musitano family, who owed some $250,000 to Papalia. More broadly, the Rizzuto family of Montreal were moving in to take over Ontario, and had chosen the Musitano family as their instrument, which in turn required the elimination of the Papalia family. As the most senior surviving figure in the Papalia family and the longtime heir apparent, Barrillaro became the new boss of the family. Papalia, a deeply paranoid man, had never formally named a successor, but as Barrilaro was the strongest personality within the family after Papalia, he had been widely assumed to be the successor for years, and immediately proclaimed himself the new boss upon hearing of Papalia's murder.

Two days after Papalia's murder, Barillaro met with Pat Musitano, a meeting which unknown to both men was secretly recorded by the police. The meeting was an extremely unfriendly one, with an angry Barillaro accusing Musitano of ordering Papalia's murder, saying he had heard a rumor that Murdock was the hitman and the Musitano brothers were his employers. At a meeting in Buffalo in June 1997 attended by senior Magaddino family leaders, Barillaro received permission to kill Pat Musitano. According to Murdock, Barillaro planned to personally kill Musitano himself as the rumor within underworld circles was that Barillaro had said at the meeting: "I'll take care of that fat piece of shit myself". Murdock testified that the Musitano brothers were greatly afraid of Barillaro and wanted him killed before he could kill them.

Two months later, on 23 July 1997, Murdock killed Barillaro with a 9mm handgun after making the comment, "This is a message from Pat". The murder occurred in Barillaro's Niagara Falls home after the victim's wife and children had left. Murdock said that Angelo Musitano was waiting in the vehicle outside during this time. The two then left the scene. Murdock and Barillaro struggled for several minutes before Murdock was able to shoot him. When Barillaro's wife and daughters came home from their shopping trip with Barillaro's birthday presents, they found him lying in a pool of his blood. The motive for the "hit" was self-protection. Pat was convinced that Barillaro would target him in retribution for the Papalia killing, so he and Murdock acted first. Besides for Papalia and Barrillaro, the Musitano brothers had also wanted Murdock to kill Ion Croitoru, the professional wrestler and president of the Satan's Choice Hamilton chapter, and Mario Parente, the president of the Outlaws' Hamilton chapter. Barillaro's time as the Papalia family boss was very brief, lasting less than two months, but the Canadian journalist Jerry Langton wrote that everything indicated Barillaro was a formidable Mafiosi who was more than capable of leading the Papalia family and with his murder, the family went into decline.

In November 1998, Murdock pleaded guilty to three counts of second degree murder, was sentenced to life imprisonment, and named Pat and Angelo as the men who had ordered the murders; he was released on parole after serving 13 years. In February 2000, the brothers were sentenced to 10 years for conspiracy in the murder of Barillaro in a plea bargain arrangement. No conviction was obtained in relation to the murder of Papalia. In October 2006, the Musitano brothers were both released from prison. After Murdock had served 13 years in prison, he was granted day parole in December 2011, before full parole in 2014.

== Books ==
- Auger, Michel; Edwards, Peter (2012). The Encyclopedia of Canadian Organized Crime: From Captain Kidd to Mom Boucher. Toronto: McClelland & Stewart. ISBN 978-0771030499..
- Cédilot, André; Noël, André (2012). Mafia Inc.: The Long, Bloody Reign of Canada's Sicilian Clan. Toronto: Vintage Canada. ISBN 9780307360410.
- Humphreys, Adrian (1999). The Enforcer:Johnny Pops Papalia, A Life and Death in the Mafia. Toronto, Canada: Harper Collins. ISBN 0-00-200016-4.
- Humphreys, Adrian (2011). The Weasel: A Double Life in the Mob. Toronto: John Wiley & Sons. ISBN 0470964510.
- Langton, Jerry (2010). Showdown How the Outlaws, Hells Angels and Cops Fought for Control of the Streets. Toronto: John Wiley and Sons. ISBN 9780470678787.
- Schneider, Stephen (2009). Iced The Story of Organized Crime in Canada. Toronto: John Wiley & Sons. ISBN 9780470835005.
