= John Gordon Harris =

Canadian policeman (1947–2019)

John Harris
- Born: John Gordon Harris; 15 November 1947; Toronto, Ontario, Canada
- Died: 19 September 2019 (aged 71); Hamilton, Ontario, Canada
- Police career
- Department: Hamilton Police Service
- Service years: 1972–2012
- Rank: Sergeant

John Gordon Harris (15 November 1947 – 10 September 2019) was a Canadian policeman, widely regarded as one of the most honored officers of the Hamilton Police Service.

== Football player ==
Harris was born in Toronto, the son of a policeman. As an youth, he dreamed of being a football player for the Toronto Argonauts. Harris stated in 2012: "Football kept me in school".

Between 1967 and 1971, Harris attended the University of Minnesota on a scholarship awarded to football players. Harris nearly joined the U.S Marine Corps in order to fight in the Vietnam War, but was dissuaded by his coach, which became the source of a lifetime regret for him. In 1971, he graduated with a joint degree in history and political science, and then returned to Toronto to attend York University in order to "kill time", as he phrased it. In 1971, he was drafted to play for the Hamilton Tiger-Cats football team, which led him to visit Hamilton for the first time. While recovering from a broken ankle after playing for one season for the Tiger-Cats, he joined the Hamilton police force in 1972.

== Policeman ==
=== Beat cop ===
Harris was a huge 6'7 man, described by the journalist Jerry Langton as "the biggest, most intimidating cop I've ever seen" and "the most knowledgeable person I have ever met in law enforcement when it comes to biker gangs, especially in Ontario".

Harris stated in the late 1970s that the biggest source of crime in Hamilton were the Musitano family. In the 1970s, Hamilton was known as "Bomb City" owing to the frequency which Hamilton businesses that were late in paying or had refused to pay extortion money were blown up by the Wild Ones outlaw biker club, which was working for the Musitano family. Harris recalled about the Musitano family: "You couldn't help but bump into them on James Street North. They were never rude because they didn't want any more attention than they were already getting".

In the summer of 1979, Constable Harris pulled over Frank Papalia, the brother of the gangster Johnny Papalia. At the time, Johnny Papalia was in prison, and Frank Papalia served as the boss of the Papalia family during his absence. Frank Papalia complained: "Is it because of my name, my last name? You're only stopping me because of who I am and the family name". Harris was tasked with arresting Papalia so the police could impound his Cadillac automobile in order to plant a bug. After a night out at the Gold Key Club, Papalia was stopped by Harris at about 2 am while driving home. Harris demanded that Papalia take an alcohol breath test, which he refused. Harris then arrested and charged Papalia with impaired driving and refusing to give a breath sample. As a result, his Cadillac was impounded, which allowed the police to plant a bug. At Papalia's trial in 1981, the bug-planting operation became the center of some dispute as Papalia's lawyer, Ross MacKay, accused the police of misconduct. The case ended with the judge suspending Papalia's driver's license for three months, a case that ended the aura of impunity that surrounded the Papalia family in Hamilton ever since 1961.

=== Anti-Gangster Squad ===
Harris was assigned to the organized crime unit because it was felt he could best handle the "low-life, anti-social misfits" that made up the Hamilton underworld. Harris recalled in 2012: "They were all about intimidation and I thought I could do it better than they could". A major break was made in investigating the bombing spree on 3 June 1980, when a bomb planted in La Favorita Bakery on Concession Street failed to explode due to faulty construction with an excess of glue insulating the screw that was to send the electric current to set off the dynamite. Harris was involved in the investigation where the police were able to trace the process of the bomb's construction starting with the stolen dynamite. As a result, Tony Musitano was convicted of extortion and sentenced to 15 years in prison. Harris frequently crossed paths with Mario Parente, the president of first the Hamilton chapter of Satan's Choice and then the Outlaws. Parente has stated that Harris was the only policeman he ever respected.

In 1981, Harris was assigned to the anti-biker unit of the Hamilton police, where he became the "nemesis" of Walter Stadnick, the Hells Angel who became their national president in 1988. Harris had first met Stadnick in 1977, whom he described as "just a little guy... He was almost invisible – but he did have a head on his shoulders". Harris broke up a plot by the Outlaws to kill Stadnick by firing a rocket from a military rocket launcher at him, arresting the Outlaws involved. Harris noted when Stadnick became the Hells Angel national president, he started to own a Jaguar automobile with Quebec license plates, which stood out in the working class city of Hamilton. Stadnick once called Harris, saying: "I need to speak to Sergeant Harris". When Harris dismissed the call as a prank, Stadnick became very angry, saying: "Yes, it's Walter Stadnick. Of course it's Walter Stadnick!" When Harris asked what the call was about, Stadnick complained a solid gold belt buckle shaped in the form of the Angels' deathhead logo had been damaged by the police, a matter that Harris knew nothing about. Stadnick sued Harris in a civil court for the alleged damage to his belt buckle, a case that Harris won. Harris described Stadnick as a vindictive and petty man who seemed to greatly resent police attention. Harris called Stadnick "a hard guy to nail. You start to realize this guy is smart. He does know his way around the system, and he's got the money to afford decent lawyers. It would take a bigger organization, more than just one police department. And we had to make sure we dotted all our is and crossed all our ts and did it properly".

Harris stated he was appointed to the anti-biker squad because of his height, saying: "I'm sure that helped. It's always nice if you're the biggest guy – at least you can intimidate somebody". Langton stated that despite his height that Harris had a "quick wit" and was always friendly. Langton wrote that unlike most police officers, Harris preferred to give an interview while driving about Hamilton instead in his office or coffee shop. Harris was married, but refused to discuss his family in public out of the fear of his enemies in the Hamilton underworld. Harris served as expert witness for the Crown in several trials of outlaw bikers, and from abroad was consulted by both the United States Federal Bureau of Investigation and the Secret Service.

In 1984, when Parente shot and killed Jimmy Lewis, Harris received a call that a man had been killed outside of the Outlaws' clubhouse. Harris stated that he thought at the time: "That could only be one person". When Harris arrived at the crime scene, a police officer told me: "They call this guy 'The Wop'? Do you know him?" Harris laughed and said he knew him very well, so much so that he guessed that Parente had almost certainly gone to the house of a friend in St. Catharines. His assumption proved to be correct, and Parente was arrested by the Niagara Regional Police later that night at the house where Harris said he would be.

Harris was also involved in investigating the Papalia family. In an attempt to gather evidence to charge Johnny Papalia, secret microphones were planted in Papalia's office for the Galaxy Vending company on Railroad street. To avoid the bugs, Papalia took to having his meetings with other gangsters while walking up and down Railroad Street, which led Harris to have bugs planted in the parking meters on Railroad Street. Harris also tried unsuccessfully to have the Canadian Army plant bugs in the trees in Central Park, which was at the bottom of Railroad Street, which also a favorite meeting place for Papalia. Harris had video cameras installed on the top floor of the Bell Canada building on Railroad Street and on the roof of the Sir John A. MacDonald high school which overlooked Papalia's offices in an attempt to gather intelligence and evidence about Papalia. Harris pressured several criminals into wearing a wire while meeting with Papalia, but he was always very careful with his words and there was never enough recorded to lay charges. However, Harris did foil several of Papalia's schemes by "unofficially threatening" gangsters by telling them he knew precisely what Papalia had planned to do to a specific person and that if anything happened to that person, he would "come down hard" on the gangsters, a tactic that is believed to saved several lives. In 1985, Harris was involved in the effort to stop Papalia from his netting what he called his "retirement fund" by defrauding mortgage companies of some $10 million by having dummy corporations apply for mortgages to develop property in Hamilton, which Papalia planned to keep for himself after the loans were issued. Though there was not enough evidence to lay charges against Papalia, the mortgage companies were warned about Papalia's scheme.

=== Illness and recovery ===
In 1991, Harris was promoted from constable to sergeant. The same year, during a vacation in Australia, due to diabetes, both of Harris's feet became infected with gangrene and two toes on his left foot had to be amputated. In 1996, the only partially healed ligaments in his right foot became infected again, forcing the doctors to sever parts of his foot. In April 2004, another infection had turned his right foot into a "big ham", as he called it, forcing the doctors to amputate all of his right leg below his knee. Despite his injuries, Harris returned to duty in October 2004, becoming the first Canadian police officer to work with an artificial leg. In 2009, Harris stated in an interview that the Mafia was still a major force in the Hamilton underworld, saying: "Look at the Royal Connaught situation, lots of people got paid, but not a thing been done". Harris was referring to the 19th century Royal Connaught Hotel, which had once been the grandest hotel in Hamilton, which the city of Hamilton had decided to restore at great expense as the costs of the restoration kept ballooning.

In 2010, Harris won the Blue Line Police Leadership Award, given to the most outstanding Canadian police officer who embodies the principle that "leadership is an activity, not a position." The Hamilton police chief Glenn De Caire wrote: "Sgt. John Harris is without equal as a supervisor. He is equally a mentor, sympathetic listener, task-master and supporter... his squad members consider him a co-worker... and he is the quintessential 'cops' cop." Although Harris never rose above the rank of sergeant, it was by choice as he preferred to work in the field instead of a desk position. In 2012, the journalist Susan Clairmont wrote: "Harris is, surely, the most respected member of the Hamilton Police Service, an organization with some 800 sworn officers and nearly 300 civilians." Despite his tough reputation, Harris was known for providing emotional support to the officers under his command as he stated that police work is emotionally draining as officers came face-to-face with death and suffering, saying it was not "wimpy" for police officers to admit that their line of work could at times be emotionally exhausting.

== Death ==
Harris died on 10 September 2019 of natural causes.

== Books ==
- Langton, Jerry (2010). Showdown: How the Outlaws, Hells Angels and Cops Fought for Control of the Streets. Toronto: John Wiley. ISBN 978-0470678787.
- Humphreys, Adrian (1999). The Enforcer:Johnny Pops Papalia, A Life and Death in the Mafia. Toronto, Canada: Harper Collins. ISBN 0-00-200016-4.
- Sher, Julien; Marsden, William (2003). The Road to Hell: How the Biker Gangs Are Conquering Canada. Toronto: Vintage. ISBN 978-0676975994.
