= Fat Pat (disambiguation) =

Fat Pat (1970–1998) was an American rapper.

Fat Pat may also refer to:

- Pat Butcher or Fat Pat, a character in EastEnders
- Pat or Fat Pat, a Little Britain character in Fat Fighters
- Pat Musitano, member of the Musitano crime family
