= Luzzi =

Luzzi may refer to:

- Luzzi, Italy, a town and comune in southern Italy
- Luzzi (surname), an Italian surname
