= Musitano crime family =

Italian-Canadian crime family

- Founded: 1940s
- Founded by: Angelo Musitano
- Founding location: Hamilton, Ontario, Canada
- Years active: 1940s–present
- Territory: Canada: Various neighbourhoods in Hamilton and Toronto; Italy: Delianuova and Platì in Calabria, and Buccinasco and Bareggio in Milan
- Ethnicity: People of Italian descent as "made men", and other ethnicities as "associates"
- Criminal activities: Racketeering, loan sharking, money laundering, fraud, prostitution, murder, gambling, drug trafficking, smuggling, extortion and corruption
- Allies: Rizzuto crime family Independent Soldiers; West End Gang; Hells Angels; Cuntrera-Caruana Mafia clan Various other crime families and gangs
- Rivals: Luppino-Violi crime family Papalia crime family Various gangs over Canada including their allies

The Musitano crime family (Italian: [muziˈtaːno]), also known as Musitano 'ndrina, is a 'Ndrangheta organized crime family based in Hamilton, Ontario, Canada, while another branch of it is active in Platì in Southern Italy and Buccinasco and Bareggio in Northern Italy.

Founded by Angelo Musitano in Canada in the 1940s, the family was one of three centralized organized crime organizations in Hamilton, with the other two being the Luppino crime family and the Papalia crime family. Unlike the other two Hamilton families, the Musitanos did not form a strong alliance with the Buffalo crime family, staying closer to their 'Ndrangheta cell.

The Musitano 'ndrina, in contrast to its relevance in the Canadian underworld, held a much less prominent role in Italy, where it became more known to the authorities only during the 1980s, when it was affiliated with the 'ndrine Ruga and Aquilino, and led by Domenico Musitano, killed in 1986.

The killings of Johnny Papalia and his lieutenant Carmen Barillaro in 1997, ordered by brothers Angelo and Pat Musitano, had effectively wiped out the family's remaining leaders in Canada. One news report stated that the events of 1997 "decapitated the Papalia family." The brothers were arrested and sentenced in 2000 and then released in 2006. A power struggle within the Hamilton mafia had been the result of several attempts made on Pat's life in the 2010s; Angelo was killed in 2017 and, finally, Pat was killed in 2020.

== Early history ==
In 1937, (Note: 1929 has also been cited.) Angelo Musitano, known as the "Beast of Delianova", fled illegally from Delianuova, Italy, to Canada, after killing his sister Rosa and injuring her lover in the belief that she had disgraced the family by becoming pregnant out of wedlock. Musitano went to France and then Canada, where he lived under the assumed name of Jim D'Augustino. In 1940, an Italian court convicted Angelo in absentia to 30 years in prison. On May 8, 1963, the Hamilton police received a request from Interpol for "Angelo Musitano, killer", believed to be living in Hamilton. Angelo was arrested on March 3, 1965, by Hamilton police at the home of his brother Pasquale. Angelo was then extradited to Italy to serve his sentence. He had two nephews, Anthony ("Tony") and Dominic Musitano, in Hamilton.

In 1978, Dominic Musitano, then owner of a Hamilton haulage company, Rocco Luppino, and Angelo Natale, president of the Ontario Haulers Association, were charged with conspiracy to commit extortion after police uncovered a protection racket on Ontario's independent trucking industry. After a five-year legal battle, they were acquitted in 1983. Dominic Musitano, described as "short, rotund and with grey-green pop eyes" was notorious for his rage issues and once shot and wounded a motorist for repeatedly honking his automobile horn at him.

== "Bomb City" and the Racco murder ==
Between 1978 and 1980, the Musitano family carried out a bombing campaign against businesses that refused to pay extortion money. The Musitano family employed the Wild Ones biker gang, led by Walter Stadnick, as subcontractors to build and plant the bombs. Hamilton police detective Ken Robertson, who investigated the bombings, stated: "It was quite a sophisticated operation". Anthony "Tony" Musitano met with Douglas Cummings of the Wild Ones at a cockfight organized by the biker gang, who agreed to build bombs for the Musitano family. The Wild Ones disbanded in 1979 after five of their members were killed by the Hamilton chapter of the Outlaws over the course of 1978 and 1979. The first business bombed was the Genuine Bakery owned by Gino Meranageli, with $10,000 in damages caused by an explosion on December 29, 1978. On May 3, 1979, La Favorita Bakery suffered $15,000 worth of damage after a hole was drilled though the roof, in which gasoline was poured and then ignited. On November 10, 1979, the Grand Prix Motors auto dealership was bombed. Bertulia D'Agostiono, who opened her automobile repair shop, Alba Collision, was visited by two members of the Musitano family who told her that it was in her best interest to sign over 50 percent of her business to them. When she refused, Alba Collision was burned down in a case of arson in September 1980, and in April 1981 D'Agostino's house was burned. Due to many businesses being bombed in the late 1970s and early 1980s, Hamilton became known as "Bomb City". Policeman John Gordon Harris recalled about the Musitanos in 2017: "You couldn't help but bump into them on James Street North. They were never rude because they didn't want any more attention than they were already getting". Robertson stated in 2017: "The Musitanos were infamous...And the cheese industry. They took over cheese shipments from Italy and the prices doubled. It was part of their operation".

On June 3, 1980, a bomb planted in La Favorita Bakery on Concession Street failed to explode due to faulty construction. Detectives were able to trace the dynamite used in the bomb through its serial number to the quarry where it was stolen. In October 1980, the Hamilton police charged Anthony Musitano, Douglas Cummings, Elizabeth Wala, and Leslie Lethbridge with the bombings. Cummings was the chief bombmaker and a former member of the Wild Ones, and assembled the bombs along with Lethbridge. Elizabeth Wala, Cummings's common-law wife, was recorded on a police wiretap as saying to him: "He won't be happy with that bakery. Because remember, we phoned him to get paid the next day ... We've been working for the Mafia. Everything that's been done is got to do with them... Those gang fights with the Mafia, all those places that have been blown up and all that, all it is just the Mafia dispute, eh, and all they're been doing is blowing each other up. They [the police] finally got rid of the fucking bikers. Now they got to worry about the Mafia. Don't get no rest in this city... Everybody's running around with bombs, it's true ... You know this is bomb city, right? This place has more bombings than any other city in the whole of Canada for the size of it, I'd say". The wiretap revealed to police that the bombers were working for the Musitano family and changed the focus of the investigation.

In January 1983, Tony Musitano was sentenced to life in prison (later reduced to 15 years on an appeal) for bombing a number of businesses in Hamilton, including the bakeries. Cummings, Wala and Lethbridge were also convicted in the same trial. Cummings was sentenced to imprisonment for life, while Lethbridge was sentenced to 18 years and Wala to 15 years. While in prison, Tony orchestrated the murder of Toronto mobster Domenic Racco of the Siderno Group, who violated their cocaine trade agreement by dealing behind Musitano's back, and also owed the Musitano family as much as $500,000. Racco was also arrested in February 1982 and charged in connection with a cocaine-trafficking conspiracy and was awaiting trial. At Millhaven Institution in Kingston, Tony Musitano befriended inmate Billy Rankin who was due to be released in December that year. Tony and Dominic's nephew, Giuseppe "Joey" Avignone, often visited Tony in prison to discuss details of the plot, conversations which were secretly recorded by police. Rankin was released on December 7, 1983, and given "the okay" by Dominic Musitano. On December 10, Racco got into a car in front of his Mississauga apartment with Rankin, Dominic Musitano and Peter Majeste, thinking it was to discuss potential drug trade, but was taken to a railway track and killed. In March 1984, Dominic and Tony Musitano, Avignone and Rankin were arrested. Dominic Musitano received six years for being an accessory after the fact to murder. Tony Musitano, already in prison on the bombing charges, was sentenced to 12 years concurrently, Avignone got five years and Rankin was sentenced to 12 years, all three pleading guilty to conspiracy to commit murder. Tony was granted full parole in 1990.

Journalist Jerry Langton called the Musitano family "more low-level crooks and thugs than [an] organized unit" who worked for the Papalia family. According to Mafia expert Antonio Nicaso: "They were not at the same level of Papalia. For many years, the Musitano family lived in the shadow of Papilia." The relationship between the Papalia family and the Musitanos was never friendly, as Johnny Papalia did not trust the bad-tempered and combative Dominic Musitano, who in turn disliked Papalia as the boss of a more powerful family. Dominic Musitano's two sons, Pasquale ("Pat" or "Fat Pat") and Angelo "Ang" Musitano, joined their father in organized crime. Pasquale was born in 1968 and became president of P&L Tire Recycling Inc. that his father purchased in 1983. By 1992, the Hamilton-Wentworth Police estimated that the family was earning $14 million per year through illegal gaming.

== The Musitano brothers ==
Pat Musitano was charged in 1992 after an attempted arson of the Collins Hotel in Dundas, Ontario, the home of eight individuals at the time. He was not convicted.

In 1992, Pat Musitano was found guilty of failing to make his Mount Hope tire dump conform to the Ontario fire code. According to documents obtained by the Toronto Star, "he and his father created a fire hazard with an illegal tire dump in Mount Hope and then tried [without success] to get $3 million to $5 million of tax dollars to clean it up". They were later handed a $1.8 million fine from the Ministry of the Environment for its cleanup of the site, a fine Pat dodged with a 1993 bankruptcy claim. The crime family was led by Dominic until his death on August 13, 1995, from a heart attack at the age of 57. Pat Musitano took over as boss of the family. In 1996, Pat along his brother-in-law, John Trigiani, were acquitted of insurance fraud with regard to the Collins Hotel arson attempt.

In 1997, Pat Musitano was in charge of a sports betting ring which brought in as much as $100,000 in bets per week; his cousin Joey Avignone also led a network for distributing illegal gambling machines in bars.

According to John Ross who was a Hamilton police sergeant, Pat Musitano was "a decidedly blue-collar mobster who loved cars, hung out in restaurants, wore dark sunglasses and dressed up in suits ... He was Tony Soprano before Tony Soprano was on television." The Musitano brothers' ideas about what a gangster should be like were considerably more influenced by how Mafiosi were portrayed in American films and television than by the traditions of Calabria or Sicily. Nicaso stated in 2010: "They were totally different in terms of character than Papalia; he always tried to keep a low profile—he was a very old-fashioned boss in that sense. They are the new face of organized crime—they liked to show off."

== Papalia hit and arrests ==
Pat Musitano (left) and Angelo Musitano pictured in 1998. The two brothers had ordered the murder of rival mob boss Johnny Papalia.

Enio Mora of the Papalia family borrowed $7.2 million from Vito Rizzuto of Montreal's Rizzuto family and handed over the bulk of the money to Johnny Papalia and Carmen Barillaro, who invested some of the money to open nightclubs and restaurants while the rest just disappeared. Barillaro as a "made man" in the Magaddino family felt no pressure to repay the loan as he said on his phone "They can't touch us". The Canadian journalists André Cédilot and André Noël wrote that this was a "major mistake" as Rizzuto decided to wipe out the Papalia family's leaders. Rizzuto formed an alliance with the Musitano brothers, who had their own reasons for wanting to eliminate the Papalia family. Both Papalia and Barillaro were "made men" in the Magaddino family, and the Musitano brothers would need the "protection" of a more powerful family to guard against vengeance from the Buffalo family. In April 1997, Pasquale Musitano met with Gaetano "Guy" Panepinto, the Toronto agent of Montreal's Rizzuto family, in Niagara Falls. Musitano was unhappy with the way that his family was subordinate to the Papalia family, which in turn was the Canadian branch of the Magaddino family. Musitano wanted an alignment with the Rizzuto family, which in turn was looking to expand into Ontario. Rizzuto had been moving his family's operations into eastern Ontario and formed an alliance with the Musitano brothers. Papalia had been blocking Rizzuto's plans to move into the more populous and wealthier areas of southern Ontario.

In the spring of 1997, the family ordered the hits of Johnny Papalia, to whom the Musitanos owed $250,000 to cover bookmaking debts. The theory was that it was less expensive to have Papalia removed; the family paid $3,000 plus some cocaine for the hit. The family subsequently ordered the hit on Papalia's right-hand man, Carmen Barillaro. The hitman for the Papalia murder on May 31 and Barillaro murder on July 23, and for the 1985 murder of Salvatore Alaimo who owed gambling money to the Musitano family, was Kenneth Murdock. Langton wrote that the murder of Papalia was "an incredible affront. Nobody in Buffalo had given the Musitanos the go-ahead to kill the old man [Papalia]".

Besides Papalia and Barillaro, the Musitano brothers also wanted Murdock to kill Ion Croitoru, the president of the Satan's Choice Hamilton chapter, and Mario Parente, the president of the Outlaws' Hamilton chapter. On 20 August 1997, Murdock knocked on the door of Croitoru's house to tell him: "John, I've been sent here to kill you. But I'm not going to do it." Before Murdock could make an attempt against Parente, he was arrested for extortion. The Hamilton police had bugged the Gathering Spot Pizzeria, which was owned by the Musitano brothers and was a favourite hangout. In the audiotapes the police played for Murdock, the Musitanos laughed at and mocked Murdock as a "scumbag" of very low intelligence, and found the thought of him dying in a "tragic accident" highly amusing. Murdock was disheartened to learn this, and agreed to turn Crown's evidence against the brothers Musitano.

On 22 and 23 October 1997, Rizzuto met twice in a restaurant with his Toronto agent Gaetano "Guy" Panepinto and Pasquale "Fat Pat" Musitano. Rizzuto appointed Panepinto as his Ontario lieutenant and informed Musitano that he was to work for Panepinto. In October 1997, organized crime investigators intercepted a phone call from Pat Musitano to Panepinto; Musitano thanked Panepinto for hosting a meeting in Toronto with Vito Rizzuto. Panepinto owned a Toronto casket company called Casket Royale, and Musitano incorporated a numbered company operating under "Casket Royale Hamilton."

In November 1998, Murdock pleaded guilty to three counts of second degree murder, was sentenced to life imprisonment, and named Pat and Angelo as the men who had ordered the murders; he also said that Angelo had been waiting in the vehicle outside during the Barillaro murder. The motive for the "hit" was self-protection. Pat was convinced that Barillaro would target him in retribution for the Papalia killing, so he and Murdock acted first.

According to Murdock, the Musitano brothers had also been fed up with being a satellite (crew) of the Buffalo family and having to pay tribute money to the family. Murdock also claimed that he was waiting for Pat Musitano to approve the murders of four Luppino crime family members Natale Luppino and Vincenzo Luppino (the two sons of Giacomo Luppino) and Domenic Violi and Giuseppe Violi (the two sons of Paolo Violi). In a later interview with journalist Peter Edwards, Murdock claimed that Pat Musitano had "ordered" him to enter a coffee house with a machine gun to shoot all of the leaders of the Luppino-Violi group; that would probably have included Dominico and Giuseppe (Joey) Violi. Musitano's goal was to become the "godfather" in the Hamilton area, according to Murdock, who said that he did not refuse but never did proceed with the plan.

In February 2000, the Musitano brothers were sentenced to 10 years for conspiracy in the murder of Barillaro in a plea bargain arrangement instead of their initial first-degree murder charges. No action was taken against either in relation to the Papalia or the Alaimo murder. In 2004, both brothers were denied parole. In October 2006, the Musitano brothers were both released from prison. Angelo was re-arrested in March 2007 for a parole violation. He was held in the minimum security Frontenac Institution until June 2007 when the parole board decided not to return him to prison.

Murdock was also later released on parole in 2011 after serving 13 years in prison. In an interview with journalist Peter Edwards, Murdock explained the rationale for his involvement with Angelo and Pat Musitano. He had worked for their father, Domenic Musitano and said that "I promised to take care of his kids" ... that was the dumbest mistake I ever made." Domenic died in 1995.

== Angelo Musitano hit and investigation ==
Since the brothers' release, the police had little involvement with the family for some years. In April and May 2012, the cocaine smuggler Nick Nero, in his texts to Martino Caputo, the Toronto agent of the Rizzuto family, complained about the "work tax" that he had to pay to the Musitano family in order to smuggle cocaine into the Niagara Peninsula. Nero charged that the Musitano brothers took an exorbitant cut of the profits for doing no work. Nero asked Caputo to speak with the Musitano brothers to reduce their "work tax"; unknown to him, Pat Musitano was still angry with Caputo for not financially supporting his wife and children while he was in prison despite having promised to do so.

In September 2015, Pat Musitano's 2013 Ford Edge was set on fire in a suspected arson; his home also sustained minor damage.

On May 2, 2017, Angelo Musitano was shot dead in his truck in the driveway of his home in Waterdown, Ontario, in broad daylight at the age of 39. Surveillance video showed a Ford Fusion in front of the home and a heavy-set man shooting Angelo. The vehicle was later found abandoned; it had been stolen previously. Almost two months later, on June 26, 2017, Pat Musitano's home was shot at multiple times during the night; no one was injured. Hamilton Police did not receive cooperation from the family; Pat refused police protection. Before his death, Angelo wrote a faith-based book called I Found Him, claiming that starting a family and finding religion "changed him." According to James Dubro, "The underboss of Buffalo [Domenico Violi] ordered the hit on Angelo... It was a move against the Musitanos and they would have needed Buffalo's approval.

On January 11, 2018, investigations into Angelo Musitano's death revealed four vehicles were involved, and that he was stalked in the days leading up to his murder. On January 23, news reports from a press conference indicated that police believed that Angelo's murder and a Woodbridge, Ontario killing of veterinary technician Mila Barberi while she sat in her car with her boyfriend, two months earlier in March 2017, not previously considered to be related, appeared to have been carried out by the same individual based on footage of the shooter and the car used from surveillance cameras at the two locations. Detective-Sergeant Peter Thom of Hamilton Police stated "there is similar evidence, the same MO and the black Honda coupe." According to York Regional Police, Barberi was not likely the intended target. Barberi's boyfriend, Saverio Serrano, who was shot in the arm, was discovered to have connections to the 'Ndrangheta through his father, Diego Serrano of Vaughan, who was sentenced to four years and six months in prison on two counts of drugs conspiracy and one possession of proceeds of crime on January 15, 2018. The elder Serrano was an associate of crime figure, Antonio Sergi of Toronto, who was killed two weeks after Barberi's murder. Police did not find a link between Angelo's and Barberi's murders and the shooting of Pat Musitano's house in June 2017.

On 13 September 2018, real estate agent Albert Iavarone was shot outside his home in Ancaster, Ontario, a similar fashion as in the Musitano murder. Sources involved in the investigation said it was possible that the shooting was in retaliation for the previous actions against the Musitano family (specifically the hit on Angelo, according to some sources). In any event, it was part of a Mafia struggle in Hamilton according to several news outlets. A Toronto Star summary added that the latest hit came in "the midst of a dispute between two Niagara Region groups of mobsters who are both tied to the New York State (Buffalo) mob. Iavarone had no criminal record but was known to police as an associate of known mobsters in Hamilton. However, as of 15 September 2018, police had "not explained his alleged connection to the criminal underworld and have not determined if it was a factor in his death", according to CBC News.

On 20 September 2018, the police task force (Hamilton, York and RCMP under Project "Scopa") arrested Jabril Abdalla Hassan in Hamilton, and issued Canada-wide arrest warrants, and later international warrants for Michael Cudmore and Daniel Tomassetti who had both fled to Mexico in May 2017 and January 2018 respectively; a $50,000 reward for information leading to their arrests was also offered by police. Jabril Abdalla Hassan had already been charged with two counts of first-degree murder and three counts of conspiracy to commit murder in both the Musitano and Barberi murders, and attempted murder on Serrano. Cudmore was captured on surveillance camera at both murders with the same black Honda. Daniele Ranieri of Bolton, Ontario is believed to be connected to orchestrating the murders; he was found dead in Mexico in March 2018. In June 2020, Cudmore was found dead in Mexico. On June 15, 2021, Abdalla Hassan pleaded guilty to participating in a criminal organization was sentenced to time served — 46 months, and fined $500.

On March 18, 2026, it was announced that Tomassetti was arrested in Mexico in August 2025 and Canadian officials are seeking extradition. He had been on Canada’s most wanted list since 2023.

== Weakened position and hits on Pat Musitano ==
On April 17, 2019, Tony Musitano died in Caledonia, Ontario of natural causes at the age of 72. Pat Musitano took over as the head of "what was once one of Hamilton's most notable crime families alongside the Papalias and the Luppinos."

On April 25, 2019, Pat Musitano was shot four times outside his lawyer's office in Mississauga, sustaining life-threatening injuries; he was taken to Sunnybrook Health Sciences Centre in Toronto. By May 1, 2019, he was no longer in critical condition, and was released from hospital on May 8.

A National Post report made no comment as to the probable culprits for the attempted hit on Pat Musitano, but said that the "family's enemies are known to include criminal groups in Hamilton, Buffalo, Montreal and elsewhere, including the Luppino and Papalia crime gangs." Criminology professor Stephen Metelsky of Mohawk College provided this opinion to the Spectator:

"Given all the extenuating circumstances leading up to this, not just his brother's death, but his house being targeted twice, his uncle passing away ... I think that just opened up a ripe opportunity to speed up whatever plans were underway to make a power play into Hamilton."

Former Hamilton police officer Paul Manning, who specialized in organized crime, also believed that the recent death of Tony Musitano was relevant to the attempted hit on Pat Musitano, saying, "I think his protection just died." Manning said that the Buffalo mob may have been involved but Metelsky said that it could have been part of a local turf war. CBC News said that the 2013 death of Montreal mob boss Vito Rizzuto had "left the Musitanos to fend for themselves."

Court records from a 2018 matter against Domenico and Giuseppe "Joe" Violi of the Luppino crime family discuss a claim that the Musitanos were supporting the Cuntrera-Caruana Mafia clan who have roots in Montreal and Toronto. The records also refer to a September 2017 recording made by police indicating that Pat Musitano was already a marked man at that time, but provide no indication as to who had authorized the "hit":

"The [police agent] stated that [he] would have thought that ‘they’ would have gotten rid of [Pat Musitano] before his brother, [Angelo Musitano, murdered in May 2017]. D Violi stated that 'they' wanted to show [Pat Musitano]; that it was a message, D Violi thought. They had told D Violi that ... [Pat Musitano] would be gone; that that would be one headache out of the way."

A 2019 CBC News report later quoted a Mafia expert as stating that "[Vito] Rizzuto's death paved the way for upheaval in the underworld. There's a power struggle left from the vacuum from Rizzuto." A report by The Hamilton Spectator discussed a "resurgence of Mafia violence in Hamilton and surrounding areas that has most recently included the shooting of Hamilton mob boss Pat Musitano" but made no connection to the Luppino family. Sources contacted by CBC News led the site to state that "some sort of underworld power struggle is tearing through the region, as old scores are settled and players jockey for power in a time of unrest."

Although Pat Musitano survived the 2019 attempt on his life, "He was a dead man walking," according to Queen's University professor Antonio Nicaso, "In the world of the Mafia, revenge does not lapse. ... Mobsters can hold grudges for years, quietly hunting targets and harbouring festering feelings of revenge."

On March 2, 2020, Giorgio Barresi, a former associate of Pat Musitano who had pleaded guilty to bookmaking in 1999, was shot to death in his Stoney Creek driveway.

On July 10, 2020, Pat Musitano was shot to death beside his armour-plated SUV in broad daylight in the parking lot of a Burlington shopping plaza on Plains Road East, at the age of 52. Two other individuals sustained injuries. One sustained gunshot wounds, Musitano's bodyguard John Clary; the other individual was Musitano's cousin, Giuseppe (Pino) Avignone. A retired RCMP officer later told the Toronto Star that in his opinion, Musitano was betrayed; "otherwise, how would the killer know where to find him?"

Since the deaths of his protectors (Vito Rizzuto in 2013 and Tony Musitano in 2019), Pat had been "living on borrowed time", former Hamilton police detective Paul Manning told the Toronto Star. Manning also said that at the time of Pat's murder, he had made enemies due to a scam that involved attracting investors to a gravel business. Pat's life had been at risk for some years according to the Toronto Sun, "Pat Musitano signed his death warrant on May 31, 1997, just minutes after longtime underworld chieftain Johnny Papalia hit the sidewalk dead ...". On July 17, two cars were burned and the word "rat" was painted on the garage of Avignone's home in Hamilton. In an interview with CBC News, criminologist Anna Sergi stated about the incident at Avignone's home that, "It may have been a sign that mobsters think Avignone either betrayed Musitano for another gang or broke the rule of omertà — the Mafia's code of silence — and is speaking with law enforcement." Other sources led the CBC journalist to state that there would probably be "continued mob violence in Hamilton ... Musitano's killers may try to take over [as the Hamilton mob] — but no one can prove who is responsible yet."

On July 22, London police identified human remains found on July 19 as Grant Edward Norton, an Ingersoll man who had been reported missing on July 12 by his family, and later ruled the death as a homicide. According to the Hamilton Spectator, Norton was a partner in a construction company and Pat Musitano was a minority shareholder. The firm, Havana Group Supplies, was charged with six counts of illegal dumping and had been under investigation for fraud; Norton was facing seven fraud-related charges related to the dumping. There were no charges against Pat Musitano but according to the Spectator "It had been alleged in a court document that Musitano was receiving under-the-table payments for loads of soil that were being dumped ... in rural Flamborough." The company's principal pled guilty to fraud in March 2020 but Norton failed to attend court and a warrant was out for his arrest at the time that his body was found. On August 20, 2020, London police announced that Norton's murder had "no connection whatsoever" to Musitano's based on a "mountain of information."

== Books ==
- Cédilot, André; Noël, André (2012). Mafia Inc.: The Long, Bloody Reign of Canada's Sicilian Clan. Toronto: Vintage Canada. ISBN 9780307360410.
- Edwards, Peter; Nicaso, Antonio (2016). Business Or Blood Mafia Boss Vito Rizzuto's Last War. Toronto: Random House of Canada. ISBN 9780345813770.
- Edwards, Peter; Nájera, Luis (2021). The Wolfpack The Millennial Mobsters Who Brought Chaos and the Cartels to the Canadian Underworld. Toronto: Random House of Canada. ISBN 9780735275409.
- Humphreys, Adrian (1999). The Enforcer:Johnny Pops Papalia, A Life and Death in the Mafia. Toronto, Canada: Harper Collins. ISBN 0-00-200016-4.
- Langton, Jerry (2010). Showdown: How the Outlaws, Hells Angels and Cops Fought for Control of the Streets. Toronto: John Wiley. ISBN 978-0470678787.
- Langton, Jerry (2015). Cold War How Organized Crime Works in Canad and Why It's About to Get More Violent. Toronto: HarperColllins. ISBN 978-1-4434-3255-9.
- Schneider, Stephen (2009). Iced The Story of Organized Crime in Canada. Toronto: John Wiley & Sons. ISBN 9780470835005.
- Sher, Julian; Marsden, William (2003). The Road To Hell How the Biker Gangs Are Conquering Canada. Toronto: Alfred Knopf. ISBN 0-676-97598-4.
