= Giuseppe Leuzzi =

Italian journalist, essayist and writer

- Born: 19 June 1941 (age 85); Delianuova, Reggio Calabria
- Occupations: Journalist, essayist and writer

Giuseppe Leuzzi (born 19 June 1941, in Delianuova, Reggio Calabria) ) is an Italian journalist, essayist and writer.

== Biography ==
Leuzzi is a political and business journalist who worked as a foreign correspondent and whose articles regularly appeared in leading Italian newspapers (Repubblica, Il Foglio, Avanti!, and many others), as well as in international ones such as the International Herald Tribune. He also worked for RAI, and wrote several current events books and essays. "Corrado Alvaro" Special Prize 2007 for "La Montagna Sacra" ("National Geographic", September 2007). Runner up "Padula Prize" 2014 with "Gentile Germania".

== Bibliography ==
A selection among the many works by Giuseppe Leuzzi:

- (Gianaldo Grossi), La guerra del petrolio (Savelli, 1974)
- (Gianaldo Grossi), Iran, petrolio, violenza, potere (Mazzotta, 1975)
- Iran dopo la rivoluzione with Rahmat Khosrovi (1979, Lerici)
- Energia: per evitare la catastrofe (1980, Lerici)
- Il mondo non abita più qui (1989, Liguori) ISBN 8820718715
- In virtù della follia (1992, a historical novel, Shakespeare and company)
- Elezioni, istruzioni per l'uso con Sergio Romano (1992, Shakespeare and company)
- Fuori l'Italia dal Sud (1993, Shakespeare and company)
- Mediobanca Editore (1997;Seam).
- Gentile Germania (2014;Robin Edizioni).
