= Howard Chard =

Howard Chard (1924 – 16 April 1983), better known as "Baldy" Chard, was a Canadian professional boxer and gangster who served as the principal enforcer of the Papalia family in Toronto.

== Boxer ==
Chard first came to attention in 1940 when he broke into the house of an elderly woman and savagely beat her. He had stolen her life savings worth $2,500 that she had hidden inside of her house as she did not trust the banks, and squandered his share of the loot on alcohol and gambling. Chard was arrested after using oversized banknotes issued by the Bank of British North America from the 19th century at a bar, which led the manager to realize that the use of such ancient currency indicated that this was the thief. After his release from reform school in 1942, Chard was involved in a brawl in the Regent Park in Toronto with a policeman that ended with him using the officer's own gun to badly wound the constable. At his subsequent trial, Chard was found of wounding and attempted murder of a police officer. During his time at Kingston Penitentiary, Chard took up boxing as his principal hobby. At Kingston Penitentiary, Chard was the prison's boxing champion.

Upon his release in 1945, Chard began his boxing career by storming into a boxing match and punching one of the fighters, telling the media afterwards: "I'll fight anyone. I am always in street fights. I don't know how it happens, but I'm fighting since I was knee-high to a goat". At about the same time that Chard started his career as a professional boxer, he also started to work for the Mafia. His boxing career came to an ignominious end in the summer of 1948 during a clearly rigged boxing match in Syracuse, New York. Chard clearly dominated the match against a far weaker opponent, but then went down to be counted out despite the fact that his opponent had not even struck him. The rigged match nearly caused a riot as the enraged boxing fans demanded the return of their money. During his boxing career, Chard lost 13 fights.

== Papalia family ==
Chard stood 5'10 and weighed 300 pounds. The journalist Adrian Humphreys wrote: "Howard Chard, known as Baldy, was hailed for decades as one of the toughest men in Canada and was certainly one of the most feared. He seemed not to feel pain...In the boxing ring, he was known for his strength and ability to withstand punishment. Outside the ring, ungloved and unrestrained, he inspired fear even among Mafia bosses". In 1951, Chard joined the Papalia family and become the principal enforcer of John "Johnny Pops" Papalia. Chard's muscles and his scarred face made him "the perfect picture of frightfulness". Chard always sat besides Papalia at important meetings and was the man whom Papalia sent out to beat up those who were behind in their debts to his loan sharking business or refused to him extortion money. Papalia would visit businesses with Chard to force the owners to pay him extortion money. Papalia's standard line was to ask the owner of the business: "Johnny Papalia—does that mean anything to you?" If the answer was no, Papalia's response was always to say: "Well, it's going to! I'm your new partner". Chard was considered sufficiently terrifying that most businessman agreed to pay Papalia's request for "protection" money. Paul Rimstead of the Toronto Sun wrote in 1983: "He never lost a street fight, a fight in the reform school, in reformatory or in the pen".

Chard also worked as a pimp. At a trial in Toronto on charges of selling alcohol to an underage teenage girl in 1953, Chard acted as his own lawyer and asked the girl when she was on the witness stand if he ever sold her alcohol. The girl told the courtroom: "Yes. And I'm glad of a chance to tell the truth". She told the courtroom that Chard had threatened to "fix" her if she told the truth and wanted her to commit perjury. The trial ended with Chard being convicted of robbery with violence, assault causing bodily harm, operating a bawdy house and living off the avails of prostitution.

On Easter Sunday 1955, Papalia organised the last known bare-knuckle boxing match in Canada, decades after bare-knuckle boxing had been banned. The illegal boxing match attended by Papalia along with 100 other people pitted Chard against James J. Parker, the former Canadian and British Empire boxing champion. Parker greatly hated Chard, saying: "I had no respect for Baldy. He was a pimp and a stoolie and a bully. But he might have been the toughest guy in the world". The Parker–Chard fight was noted for its bloodiness as both men pummeled each other without mercy. Parker recalled: "We almost killed other. Some said we fought for 59 straight minutes. Somebody else said he timed us at 44 minutes". At one point in the match, one of Parker's friends tried to pull a gun, and was restrained by Papalia's thugs. The match ended with victory for Chard. In the 1960s, Chard served as the bouncer at the Arabian Village Tavern owned by Papalia. Chard's presence ensured that the gamblers cheated by Papalia and his underlings rarely complained. In the 1960s, Chard had a celebrated street fight in Toronto with Howard Doyle "Pigpen" Berry of the Satan's Choice Motorcycle Club.

In 1975, Chard was living rent-free on a farm owned by Papalia in Waterdown. In the spring of 1975, Papalia was looking to sell the farm and told Chard to stay inside while he showed the prospective buyers around. The message did not reach Chard in time, and Papalia exploded in rage when the four prospective buyers all saw the uncouth Chard wandering around. As Papalia screamed abuse at Chard, the latter responded by punching him in the face. Papalia, humiliated before the buyers, got up and said: "We'll talk about this another time". Chard received a phone call later that day saying: "Our relationship is over", and he was now evicted from the farm. Unusually, Papalia did not lash out by having Chard killed. Bernie "The Frog" Guindon, the national president of Satan's Choice, knew Chard in the 1970s and said of him: "He was friendly. I didn't find him to be a belligerent person or rude. He just did his job".

In the 1970s, Chard worked alongside the gangster Marvin "The Weasel" Elkind as debt collectors for loan sharks. Staff Superintendent Frank Barbetta of the Toronto police said of the duo: "Best collection team I ever ran into: Elkind and Chard. One guy makes the threats and the other looks like he can carry them out". The business came to a stop in 1978 when Elkind dropped off Chard at the police station where he attacked Inspector Jimmy Morgan, who he felt had insulted his wife. After Chard was released from prison in 1980, he resumed his work with Elkind. Typical of their work was a visit to London, Ontario in 1980 when the two beat up a dentist and forced him to pay $12,000. During the drive back to Toronto, Chard told Elkind that the duo had the best job in the world, leading to an incredulous Elkind to tell him: "What's the matter with you? Everybody hates us, we got the cops looking at us all the time, we got people looking at us like we're the bad guys, we got people that we gotta see that when we walk in their door we never know if they're going to greet us with a twelve-gauge or a baseball bat. We never know what they're going to do when they find we're looking for them. Anything could happen". Chard replied: "That's what makes it so terrific". Chard died in 1983 of diabetes.

== Books ==
- Edwards, Peter (2017), Hard Road: Bernie Guindon and the Reign of the Satan's Choice Motorcycle Club, HarperCollins, ISBN 978-1443427258
- Humphreys, Adrian (1999). The Enforcer:Johnny Pops Papalia, A Life and Death in the Mafia. Toronto, Canada: Harper Collins. ISBN 0-00-200016-4.
- Humphreys, Adrian (2011). The Weasel: A Double Life in the Mob. Toronto: John Wiley & Sons. ISBN 978-0470964514.
