= Vincenzo Leuzzi =

Vincenzo Leuzzi (Rome, 1909–1983) was Director of the Transport Institute, University of Rome Engineering School.

Prof. Leuzzi's main contributions were in public transport policy at international and national levels, especially in electric rails.

== Biography ==
He completed his Degree in Industrial Engineering at La Sapienza University in 1931. In 1932 he became the teaching assistant of prof. Umberto Bajocchi. In the same years, he contributed to some projects, such as the design of the Rome Metro in 1937, and the improvement of the electric power plants of Rome–Lido railway in 1938. He had been teaching "Electric traction" since 1952, and "Economy of Transports" since 1951 at University of Bari and in Rome. He served as Director of the Transport Institute of Rome from 1957 to 1977, when he retired.

Leuzzi made contributions to the policy of transport in several countries, such as Italy, France, Switzerland, Baltic states, etc.

The Library of the Department of Transport Engineering of La Sapienza University, in the main Faculty building next San Pietro in Vincoli, is entitled to Prof. Vincenzo Leuzzi.

== Studies ==
- Leuzzi, Vincenzo (1974). "I trasporti in Italia" (Transports in Italy)". "Ambiente e informatica: problemi nuovi della società contemporanea - Italy". Italian Parliament, Italian Chamber of Deputies, Secretary for General Affairs. Preface by Sandro Pertini.
- Leuzzi, Vincenzo (1957). "Braking of Road Vehicles with Tandem Axles Equipped with Equalization". Automobiltechnische Zeitschrift. 59 (3): 58–61.
- Leuzzi V., in 'L'électrification en courant monophasé 50 Hz de la ligne de Valenciennes à Thionville: et les Journées d'information de Lille. (11-14 mai 1955)', Société nationale des chemins de fer français, SNCF, Dunod, 1955.
- Leuzzi, Vincenzo (1955). "The Höllenthal Railway and the Monophase 50 Hz System". Railway Engineering Abstracts. Institution of Civil Engineers.
- Leuzzi V., in "Technisches Zentralblatt. Abteilung Maschinenwesen", Berlin-Brandenburg Academy of Sciences and Humanities, 1951.

== Books ==
- Leuzzi, Vincenzo; Paribeni, M. (1951). Power Transmission from Engine to Wheels in Motor-buses", 29.me congrès international de l’Union internationale des transports publics". Edimbourg.
- Leuzzi, Vincenzo (1981). Fondamenti di Trasporti (in Italian). Roma: Edizioni Scientifiche Associate (ESA). ISBN 9788840530512.
- Leuzzi V. - "Elementi del traffico", a cura dr. ing. Antonio Atticciati - Edito a cura del Sindacato nazionale ingegneri dell'Ispettorato generale MCTC, Roma - Tip. ABeTE, 1960
- Leuzzi V. - "I fattori peso, potenza e velocità nell’ esercizio stradale", Milano, Malusardi, 1960
- Leuzzi, Vincenzo (1948). Tecnica ed economia dei trasporti: trazione elettrica, trazione diesel elettrica (Ed. riv. ed ampliata) (in Italian). Roma: Edizioni moderne.
- Leuzzi, V. - "Trazione elettrica" - Facoltà di Ingegneria di Roma, Roma - R. Pioda, (1936) (Lit.)
