= Kenneth Murdock =

Canadian truck driver

Kenneth Bishop (born Kenneth Murdock; 1963) is a Canadian truck driver who was a hitman for the Musitano crime family of Hamilton, Ontario. In 1998, Murdock was convicted of three mob hits, sentenced to life imprisonment, but turned Crown's evidence and later released on parole in 2011.

== Early life ==
In the 1970s, Murdock's stepfather John Akister had relations with Musitano family boss Dominic Musitano. By the 1980s, Murdock worked as a bouncer at Hamilton strip clubs and also earned money through extortion and armed robbery. In 1984, Murdock built a relationship with Tony Musitano, brother of Dominic, while in jail for armed robbery; Murdock was later paroled in October of that year.

== Three mob hits ==
Murdock's first mob hit for the family, for $3,000, was on November 21, 1985, on Stelco janitor Salvatore Alaimo whose brother Giovanni owed considerable gambling money to Dominic Musitano. At the time, Musitano told Murdock that dead men do not pay debts, which was why he had targeted the brother. Murdock used a submachine gun and later told the media that he had planned only to frighten Alaimo. "I actually wasn’t trying to shoot him. I was trying to shoot all around him...When the thing goes off, it has a mind of its own." In 1997, the Musitano brothers contacted Murdock, asking him if he wanted to resume working as a hitman. Murdock, who had worked as a chauffeur-bodyguard for their father, and had come to think of the younger Musitanos as nephews to whom he was indebted, accepted the offer.

On May 31, 1997, Murdock shot mob boss Johnny Papalia in the head in the parking lot of 20 Railway Street outside his vending machine business in Hamilton; he later testified that he had been hired to do so by Angelo and Pat Musitano of the Musitano crime family, who owed Papalia some $250,000. The cost of the hit was substantially less — depending on the source, the payment received by Murdock was either $2,000 or $3,000; some reports indicate that Murdock received $2,000 plus 40 grams of cocaine. Murdock went to Galaxy Vending to meet with Papalia, whom he had met several times before, to speak in the parking lot of Galaxy Vending under the false pretense of seeking his help to get money back from the Musitanos. After Papalia refused to get involved, he turned his back, and Murdock pulled out his handgun and shot him.

On July 23, 1997, Murdock shot Carmen Barillaro, the right-hand man of Papalia and a previously convicted drug trafficker, with a 9mm handgun after making the comment, "This is a message from Pat". The murder occurred in Barillaro's Niagara Falls home after the victim's wife and children had left. Murdock said that Angelo Musitano was waiting in the vehicle outside during this time. The two then left the scene. The motive for the "hit" was self-protection. Pat was convinced that Barillaro would target him in retribution for the Papalia killing, so he and Murdock acted first. Murdock later testified that the Musitano brothers had ordered him to kill four men. Besides for Papalia and Barillaro, the Musitano brothers also wanted him to kill Mario Parente, the president of the Outlaws' Hamilton chapter and Ion Croitoru, the professional wrestler who served as the president of the Satan's Choice Hamilton chapter. On 20 August 1997, Murdock knocked on the door of Croitoru's house to tell him "John, I've been sent here to kill you. But I'm not going to do it". Croitoru was left speechless for a moment before thanking Murdock. Unknown to the Musitano brothers, Murdock was a friend of Croitoru and could not bring himself to kill him. Murdock apparently never made an attempt against Parente.

According to Murdock, the Musitano brothers had also been fed up with being a satellite (crew) of the Buffalo crime family and having to pay tribute money to the family. Murdock also claimed that he was waiting for Pat Musitano to approve the murders of four Luppino crime family members Natale Luppino and Vincenzo Luppino (the two sons of Giacomo Luppino) and Domenic Violi and Giuseppe Violi (the two sons of Paolo Violi). In a later interview with journalist Peter Edwards, Murdock claimed that Pat Musitano actually "ordered" him to enter a coffee house with a machine gun to shoot all of the leaders of the Luppino-Violi group. Musitano's goal was to become the "godfather" in the Hamilton area, according to Murdock, who said that he did not refuse but never did proceed with the plan.

Also revealed by Murdock was that Pat Musitano had discussed with Montreal mob boss Vito Rizzuto and Gaetano Panepinto about Rizzuto investing in Ontario. Eventually, the Canadian intelligence agencies were convinced that the Musitano brothers did not act alone in the murders of Johnny Papalia and Carmen Barillaro.

In an interview, Murdock revealed cocaine helped him cope with job stress, but consoled himself with thoughts of the half-dozen killings he was ordered to do but did not carry out.

Murdock was arrested for extortion, and while in police custody, the police played audiotapes of the Musitano brothers talking about him. The police had bugged The Gathering Spot pizzeria owned by the Musitanos, who mocked and laughed at Murdock behind his back, calling him a dim-witted "scumbag" who they held in complete contempt. Perhaps more worrying to Murdock, the Musitanos stated they were only using him, and joked how they would be better off if he were dead once they were finished with his services. Though the Musitanos did not speak of murder, instead merely expressing the hope that Murdock should die in a "tragic accident" caused by him acting stupidly – a possibility that they found very amusing. Listening to the tapes persuaded Murdock to turn Crown's evidence against the Musitanos. Murdock had always loved the Musitano family and in turn believed that they loved him, and was disheartened to discover how he was really viewed by the Musitanos. Murdock testified that he was paid for his murders but that he "would have done it for free" out of his affection for the Musitano family.

== Prison and later life ==
In November 1998, Murdock pleaded guilty to three counts of second degree murder and named Pat and Angelo as the men who had ordered the hits; Murdock was sentenced to life imprisonment. During the court hearings, the Musitano brothers made no effort to hide their contempt for Murdock. The Musitanos pleaded guilty to conspiracy in Barillaro's death, but no action was taken against them for the murders of Alaimo and Papalia. They received a 10-year sentence in February 2000, but were released in October 2006 on parole. Murdock was unimpressed with the level of justice.

"They ordered the killing, and they get just 10 years. They’ll be back on the streets in less than four. It doesn’t make sense to me."

In an interview with journalist Peter Edwards, Murdock explained the rationale for his involvement with Angelo and Pat Musitano. He had worked for their father, Domenic Musitano and said that "I promised to take care of his kids ... that was the dumbest mistake I ever made". Domenic died in 1995.

After Murdock had served 13 years in prison, he was granted day parole in December 2011, before receiving full parole in 2014. After release from prison, he relocated to British Columbia where he worked as a truck driver under his changed surname, Bishop. In July 2017, his parole was revoked and he was sent back to prison for making threatening comments on social media about a prison guard he had known. He insists that the comments were meant as a joke, but the man who received them felt the comments were a threat, and the parole board agreed.
