= Alan Rook Robinson =

Canadian policeman

Alan Rooks Robinson (15 May 1932 – 8 January 2003) was a Canadian policeman.

== Early career ==
Robinson was born in Hamilton to a working-class family. At the age of 16, he became an orphan when his mother died of breast cancer and his father died of pneumonia. At the age of 17, he joined the Royal Canadian Air Force and served until 1965. Right after his honorable discharge from the Air Force, Robinson joined the Ontario Provincial Police (OPP).

== Ontario Provincial Police (OPP) ==
The journalist Adrien Humphreys described Robinson as a "renegade cop" very much like the type portrayed in Hollywood films who was "being either yelled at by his superiors for breaching protocol or rewarded for his creative techniques". Robinson worked in the Intelligence Branch of the OPP and in 1983 was assigned as the handler for the informer Marvin Elkind. Elkind had a very close relationship with Robinson, saying in a 2011 interview: "To me Robbie became my pillar of strength. I feared him, but I had a great deal of respect for him and I was very fond of him. But most of all, I feared he would be disappointed in me". Humphreys described the partnership between Robinson and Elkind as the most successful duo between a policeman and an informer in the history of Ontario, and several times visited the FBI Academy in Quantico, Virginia to train agents in the bureau as "the ultimate example of a handler-informant relationship".

Robinson often joined Elkind in his undercover work, using as his alias "Colonel Gibson". Robinson had served in the Royal Canadian Air Force before joining the OPP, and created the persona of "Colonel Gibson", a slightly deranged former Air Force officer who been given a dishonorable discharge and was now working as an arms dealer. In 1983, Robinson, Elkind and another undercover OPP policewoman Danielle McLean infiltrated an automobile theft ring that was smuggling stolen cars into the United States. The undercover work led to the break-up of the auto theft ring. Later in 1983, Robinson started an investigation via Elkind of a ring that smuggled VHS tapes of children pornography into Canada. The case ended with the conviction of the phonography tycoon Marty Hodas and the seizure of 1, 200 VHS tapes worth $50, 000 US dollars of children pornography. From Elkind, Robinson learned of the plans of the gangster Johnny Papalia to engage in a mass real estate scam to seize much of downtown Hamilton for himself. It was not possible to lay charges against Papalia, but his scheme was stopped.

Elkind was an official in the Teamsters union and through his Teamsters contacts met in 1984 Hector J. Massey, a political science professor with ties to the Liberal Party. When Massey bragged to Elkind that he friends in Ottawa that would allowed to control patronage and government tenders for construction, Robinson launched an investigation despite the wishes of his superiors. At a meeting in a Jamaican restaurant, Massey talked about awarding a public works project to friends of the Teamsters union in exchange for a kickback. Despite the evidence collected, Robinson was by his superiors that the case was too sensitive to bring to trial.

In 1986, Robinson under his "Colonel Gibson" alter-ego to investigate a drug smuggling ring from the United States. In Detroit, Robinson and Elkind reported to FBI Special Rich Mazzari. Their cover was accidentally blown when an inexperienced FBI agent answered a phone call with the words "FBI Detroit". Both Robinson and Elkind were forced to flee from five heavy muscled gangsters in a Detroit bar. However, the evidence gathered by Elkind and Robinson led to the arrests of a Los Angeles property developer, Kirpal Akluwalia; the owner of a bar in Mississauga and several members of the Para-Dice Riders biker gang. In 1986, Robinson contacted the journalist Peter Moon to run an expose of a boiler room operation, the so-called International Bank of St. Kitts. The article published in the Globe & Mail led to the government of St. Kitts finally shutting down the pseudo-bank.

In 1987, Robinson went undercover using his "Colonel Gibson" alias to investigate a plan to overthrow the government of Ghana. The information collected by Robinson and Elkind led to the end of the plans for the coup. In October 1990, Robinson started an investigation of Akluwalia who had released from prison. Elkind learned that Akluwalia was planning to buy 300 gas stations in Ontario as a front for money laundering of drug profits. Elkind also learned that Alkuwalia was planning to smuggle in shipments of cocaine worth $26, 000 per shipment into Canada. The case ended with the conviction of Alkuwalia in 1993 and the seizure of 21 kilograms of cocaine worth $7 million. Another investigation of a Toronto conman, Morri Friesner, led to Friesner's conviction in 1992 on 21 counts of fraud.

== Death ==
In 1994, Robinson retired from the OPP. In 1998, he was paralyzed by a stoke. He spent his last years in a retirement home in Newmarket until his death in 2003.

== Books ==
- Humphreys, Adrian (2011). The Weasel: A Double Life in the Mob. Toronto: John Wiley & Sons. ISBN 978-0470964514.
