= Luzzi (surname) =

Luzzi is an Italian surname. Notable people with the surname include:

- Abraham Luzzi, Ugandan businessman
- Beatrice Luzzi (born 1970), Italian actress and television writer
- Don Luzzi (1935–2005), Canadian politician and professional football player
- Federico Luzzi (1980–2008), Italian tennis player
- Mike Luzzi (born 1969), American jockey
