= Delianuova =

Delianuova Δέλια (Greek)
- Comune
- Comune di Delianuova
- Delianuova c. 2000

- Location within Italy Location within Calabria
- Coordinates: 38°14′N 15°55′E
- Country: Italy
- Region: Calabria
- Metropolitan city: Reggio Calabria (RC)

Area
  - Total: 21.0 km^{2} (8.1 sq mi)

Population (Dec. 2004)
  - Total: 3,542
  - Density: 169/km^{2} (437/sq mi)
- Demonym: Deliesi
- Time zone: UTC+1 (CET)
  - Summer (DST): UTC+2 (CEST)
- Postal code: 89012
- Dialing code: 0966
- Website: Official website

Delianuova (Calabrian Greek: Δέλια) is a comune (municipality) in the Province of Reggio Calabria in the Italian region Calabria, located about 90 kilometres (56 mi) southwest of Catanzaro and about 25 kilometres (16 mi) northeast of Reggio Calabria. As of 31 December 2004, it had a population of 3,542 and an area of 21.0 square kilometres (8.1 mi^{2}). Delianuova borders the following municipalities: Cosoleto, San Luca, Scido.

== Environment ==
The town is located in the Aspromonte National Park at an altitude ranging between 600 and 800 meters above sea level. It is an area of outstanding natural beauty. The town is surrounded by centuries old olive groves. The territory is also rich in holm oaks, chestnut trees and beech trees, silver firs and atmospheric black pine forests.

== History ==
Delianuova was founded on January 27, 1878 by an order of King Umberto I to amalgamate the two neighboring municipalities of Paracorio and Pedavoli. Tradition has it that Paracorio descended from the ancient Delia, a Greek city in southern Ionian coast, destroyed by the Saracens in the ninth century. Paracorio was known as Perachorio (Περαχώριον), which in Greek means "the land beyond the mountains"; Pedavoli was known in antiquity as Dapidalbon (Δαρίδαλβον) probably Tyrrhenian origin.

=== 'Ndrangheta ===
Over the years, Delianuova has been repeatedly connected with the 'Ndrangheta, both within Italy and abroad. Prominent international examples include the Musitano crime family and Johnny Papalia both from Hamilton, Ontario in Canada, and several prominent underworld figures from Melbourne, Australia. In 2008, Angelo Macrì murdered rival crime figure Rocco Frisina in a central street of Delianuova. Though the murder would have been seen by many people, all denied witnessing the event.

== Demographic evolution ==
Historical population

Year	Pop.	±%
1861	4,558	—
1871	5,003	+9.8%
1881	4,707	−5.9%
1901	5,388	+14.5%
1911	5,763	+7.0%

Year	Pop.	±%
1921	6,529	+13.3%
1931	6,028	−7.7%
1936	6,042	+0.2%
1951	6,287	+4.1%
1961	5,220	−17.0%

Year	Pop.	±%
1971	4,125	−21.0%
1981	3,686	−10.6%
1991	3,718	+0.9%
2001	3,584	−3.6%

Source: Data from ISTAT
