= Antonio Nicaso =

Italian academic and author

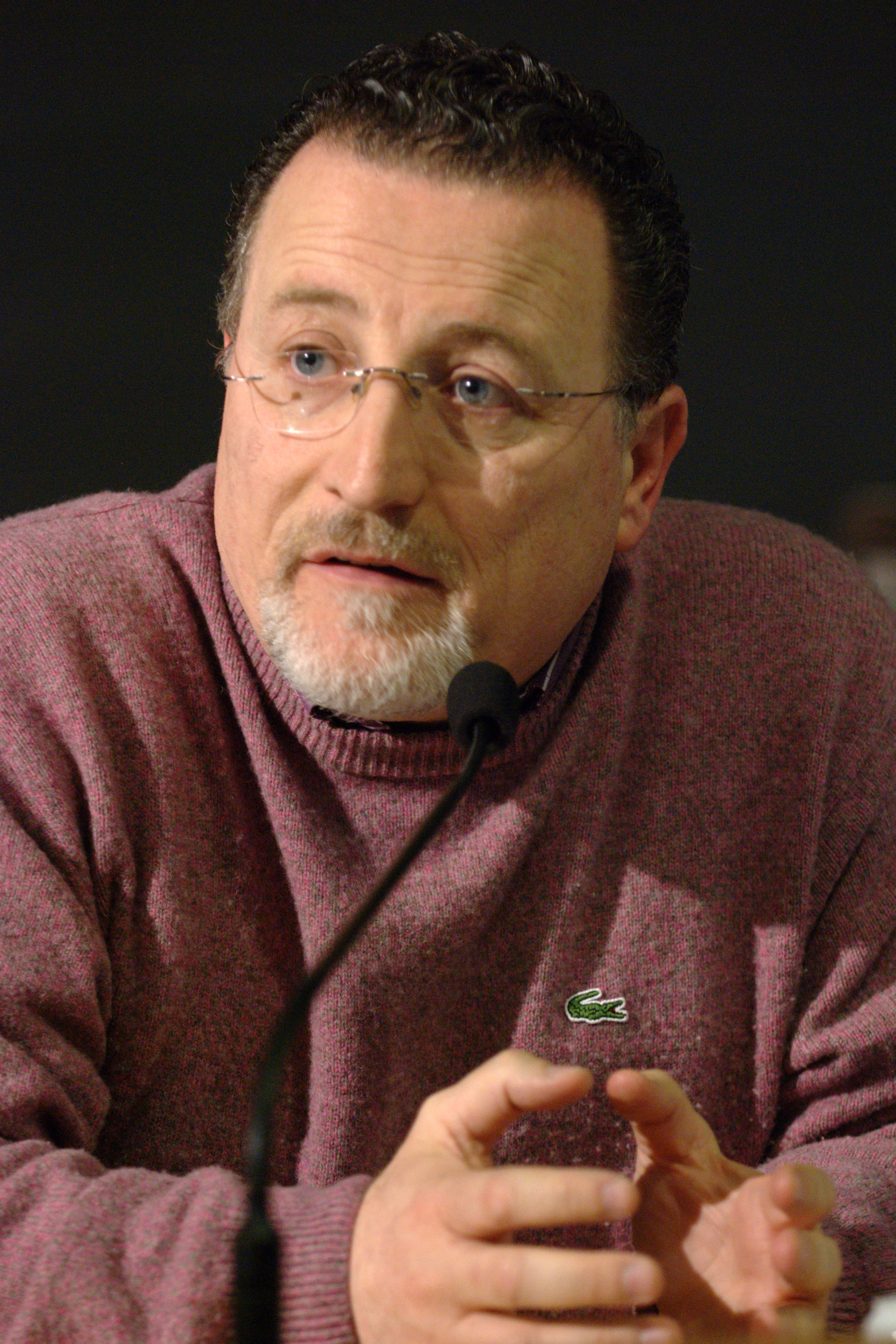
Antonio Nicaso

Antonio Nicaso (Italian: [anˈtɔːnjo niˈkaːzo]; born 1964) is an Italian author, university professor, researcher, speaker and consultant to governments and law-enforcement agencies originally from Caulonia, Calabria, Italy, now based in Toronto, Ontario, Canada. He is an expert on the Calabrian mafia (known as 'Ndrangheta). Nicaso lives and works in North America. He teaches courses on "Social History of Organized Crime in Canada" and "Mafia Culture and the Power of Symbols, Rituals and Myth" at Queen's University, in Kingston, Ontario. He also teaches at St. Jerome's University in Waterloo, Ontario and the Italian School of Middlebury College in Oakland, California in the United States and is the co-director of the Research in Forensic Semiotics Unit at Victoria College (University of Toronto).

Nicaso has published more than 60 books. His book Global Mafia, published in 1995, concerned international criminal partnerships. He sits on the Advisory Board of the Nathanson Centre on Transnational Human Rights, Crime and Security, at York University (Toronto); on the International Advisory Council of the Italian Institute of Strategic Studies "Niccolò Machiavelli" in Rome, Italy, and on the Expert Advisory Committee on Bullying, Intimidation and Gang Violence in Montreal. He is also president of Centro Scuola e Cultura, a program offering Italian courses and courses abroad in Italy.

== Career ==
Nicaso initially began his career as a print and television journalist, writing about local Italian phenomena like the 'Ndrangheta, Cosa Nostra and the Camorra. He later went on to expand his area of expertise to include international criminal organisations and has since published widely in English and Italian on the subject. With over 60 published works, many of which have been translated into other languages, Nicaso can be considered a leading authority on various aspects of international criminal organisations. One of his latest publications include Made men: Mafia Culture and the Power of Symbols, Rituals, and Myth, (2013) which attempts to deconstruct the myth propagated by cinema, television and the media of mafiosi as men of honour and Dire e non dire (Saying and Not Saying, 2012), which analyses the use of language, behavioural norms and rules associated with those involved in organised crime. Another of his books, Business or Blood: Mafia Boss Vito Rizzuto's Last War (2015) was adapted into a television series called Bad Blood, featuring Anthony LaPaglia as Vito Rizzuto, Paul Sorvino as Nicolo Rizzuto and Kim Coates as Declan Gardiner, which debuted in fall 2017, now available on Netflix worldwide.

== Selected publications ==
=== French ===
Manuela Bertone, Antonio Nicaso, Donato Santeramo (éd.), Rhétorique et représentations de la culture mafieuse. Images, rituels, mythes et symboles, « Cahiers de Narratologie », 36 / 2019.

=== English ===
- Organized crime: A cultural introduction, Routledge, 2021. Co-authored with Marcel Danesi.
- Business or Blood: Mafia Boss Vito Rizzuto's Last War, Random House, 2015. Co-authored with Peter Edwards.
- Made Men: Mafia Culture and The Power of Symbols, Rituals, and Myth, Rowman & Littlefield Publishers, Lanham, 2013. Co-authored with Marcel Danesi.
- Angels, Mobsters and Narco-Terrorists: The Rising Menace of Global Criminal Empires, John Wiley and Sons, Toronto, 2005. Co-authored with Lee Lamothe, and translated into French.
- Rocco Perri: The Story of Canada's Most Notorious Bootlegger, John Wiley and Sons, Toronto, 2004. Translated in Italian.
- Bloodlines: the Rise and the Fall of the Mafia's Royal Family, Harper Collins, Toronto, 2001. Translated into French.
- Global Mafia: The New World Order of Organized Crime, Macmillan Canada, Toronto, 1995. Co-authored with Lee Lamothe, and translated into French, Dutch, Hungarian and Indonesian.
- Deadly Silence: Canadian Mafia Murders, Macmillan Canada, Toronto, 1993. Co-authored with Peter Edwards.

=== Italian ===
- Italia. Regione contesa. Dialogo sul capitalismo mafioso e l'utopia della rinascita. With Roberto Bevacqua, Pellegrini, Cosenza, 2022.
- Il mito di Cosa Nostra. With Rosario Giovanni Scalia, Solferino, Milano, 2022.
- La Costituzione attraverso gli uomini e le donne che l'hanno fatta, Mondadori, 2022. With Nicola Gratteri.
- Complici e colpevoli, Mondadori, 2021. Coauthored with Nicola Gratteri
- Non chiamateli eroi, Mondadori ragazzi, 2021. Coauthored with Nicola Gratteri
- Ossigeno Illegale, Mondadori, 2020. Coauthored with Nicola Gratteri.
- La rete degli invisibili, Mondadori, 2019. Co-authored with Nicola Gratteri.
- Quando la 'ndrangheta scoprì l'America, Mondadori, 2018. Co-authored with Maria Barillà e Vittorio Amaddeo.
- Storia segreta della 'ndrangheta, Mondadori, 2018. Co-authored with Nicola Gratteri.
- Fiumi d'oro, Mondadori, 2017. Co-authored with Nicola Gratteri.
- L'Inganno della Mafia, Rai-Eri, 2017. Co-authored with Nicola Gratteri.
- Padrini e Padroni. Come la 'ndrangheta è diventata classe dirigente. Mondadori, 2016.
- Mafia. Bollati Boringhieri, 2016.
- Oro Bianco. Storie di uomini, traffici e denaro dall'impero della cocaina. Mondadori, 2015. Co-authored with Nicola Gratteri.
- Male Lingue: Vecchi e nuovi codici delle mafie. Pellegrini, Cosenza, 2014. Co-authored with John B. Trumper, Marta Maddalon and Nicola Gratteri.
- Cacciatori di tracce: storie di tecniche di investigazione sulla scena del crime, Utet, De Agostini, Novara, 2014. Co-authored with Sergio Schiavone.
- Acqua Santissima: La Chiesa e la 'Ndrangheta: storie di potere, silenzi e assoluzioni, (Holy Water), Mondadori, Milano, 2013. Co-authored with Nicola Gratteri. Translated into French: Sainte Mafia: Église et 'Ndrangheta: une histoire de pouvoir, de silence et d'absolution.
- Dire e non dire, I dieci comandamenti della 'ndrangheta nelle parole degli affiliati, (Saying and Not Saying: The Ten Commandments of the 'ndrangheta in the Words of its Members) Mondadori, Milan, 2012. Translated into French.
- La mafia spiegata ai ragazzi, (The Mafia Explained to Young People) Mondadori, Milan, 2011.
- La giustizia è una cosa seria, (Justice is Something Serious) Mondadori, Milan, 2011.
- La malapianta, la mia lotta contro la 'ndrangheta, (My Fight Against the 'ndrangheta) Mondadori, Milan, 2009.
- Cosenza: 'ndrine, sangue e coltelli, (Cosenza: Blood and knives) Pellegrini Editore, Cosenza, 2009.
- Il Grande Inganno: I disvalori della 'ndrangheta, (The Great Deception: The Anti-values of the 'ndrangheta) Pellegrini Editore, Cosenza, 2008.
- 'Ndrangheta: Le radici dell'odio, ('Ndrangheta: The Roots of Hatred) Aliberti, Reggio Emilia, 2007 and 2010.
- Senza Onore, antologia di testi letterari sulla 'ndrangheta, (Without Honour: An Anthology of Literary Texts on the 'ndrangheta) Pellegrini Editore, Cosenza, 2007.
- Fratelli di sangue, Storia e affari della 'ndrangheta, la mafia più potente del mondo, (Blood Brothers: History and Business of the 'ndrangheta) Mondadori, Milan, 2008. Translated into Spanish, Dutch and Slovak.
- Fratelli di sangue, La 'ndrangheta tra arretratezza e modernità: da mafia agro-pastorale a holding del crimine, (Blood Brothers, the 'ndrangheta Caught Between Backwardness and modernity) Pellegrini Editore, Cosenza, 2006.
- Io e la mafia: la verità di Giulio Andreotti, (The Mafia and Me: Giulio Andreotti's Truth) Vibo Valentia, 1995.
- 'Ndranghete: le filiali della mafia calabrese, (The 'ndranghetas: The Affiliates of the Calabrian Mafia) Monteleone, Vibo Valentia, 1994. Co-authored with Diego Minuti.
- Gli usurpatori e gli usurpati, (The Usurpers and the Usurped) Pellegrini Editore, Cosenza, 1990.
- Alle origini della 'ndrangheta: la picciotteria, (The Origins of the 'ndrangheta) Rubbettino, Cosenza, 1990.
