= Cotroni =

Cotroni is an Anglicization of the Italian surname Cotrone. Notable people with the surname include:

- Cotroni crime family, an Italian-Canadian crime family
  - Vincenzo Cotroni (1911–1984), Italian-Canadian mobster
  - Frank Cotroni (1931–2004), Italian-Canadian mobster
