= Armand Courville =

Canadian gangster (1910-1991)

- 1953 mugshot
- Born: 1910; Montreal, Quebec, Canada
- Died: 1 February 1991 (aged 80); Montreal, Quebec, Canada
- Occupation: Gangster
- Allegiance: Cotroni crime family

Armand Courville (1910 – 1 February 1991) was a Canadian gangster and a prominent associate of the Cotroni crime family in Montreal.

== Wrestler ==
Courville was born into a working class family in Montreal, where he excelled at amateur wrestling in his local Catholic school. Like most French-Canadian families at the time, the Courville family was a very large one as he had 15 siblings. Courville worked as a successful professional wrestler. To capitalize on his wrestling fame, Courville also ran a wrestling school, the Club St. Paul de Ville, where one of his students was a young Vincenzo Cotroni. Courville was a leading star in the wrestling promotion run by Sylvio Samson, holding the Quebec and Canadian mid-heavyweight championships. The promotion run by Samson between 1932-1962 was one of the most popular wrestling promotions in Quebec at the time. Cotroni also wrestled alongside Courville, playing a villainous character called Vic Vincent.

Besides for wrestling, Courville was active in organized crime, owning a number of illegal gambling houses. Courville was recruited into the Cotroni family, and unusually for a French-Canadian became one of Cotroni's leading lieutenants. Both Courville and Cotroni worked together as bootleggers, smuggling alcohol into the United States during the Prohibition era. Courville was a mentor to Cotroni-who until then had just been a petty criminal-as taught him how to be successful at bootlegging. The Canadian journalists André Cédilot and André Noël wrote: "Proudly mustachioed with a head planted between two massive shoulders, Courville was a man who literally took the law into his own hands, keeping bothersome individuals at bay with his fists and buying off politicians, city councilors, and policemen who threatened to close down his many gambling dens and speakeasies". Like many other gangsters from Montreal such as Cotroni and Paolo Violi, Courville was a short man who stood only 5'0 tall. Despite his short stature, Courville was considered to be a pugnacious character who was ferocious in personal combat both inside and outside of the wrestling ring. Courville took a strong liking to Cotroni as a man who was just as violent as himself.

== Gangster ==
Courville was close to the Parti libéral du Québec and boasted to a journalist from La Patrie newspaper that: "'J'étais le chef de la 'police' du parti Liberal" ("I am the chief of police for the Liberal Party"). Both Courville and Cotroni played leading roles in Montreal "baseball bat elections" in the 1930s, using baseball bats to threaten and beat up voters intending to vote for opposing parties. Both men started working for the ruling Parti libéral du Québec, but were also worked for the rival Union Nationale party. In the 1936 Quebec election, the Union Nationale was victorious and with the exception of the years 1939 to 1944 was in power until the 1960 election. The political connections that Courville and Cotroni forged via their work in the "baseball bat elections" ensured their relative impunity for decades afterwards as the Quebec government, whatever it was under the control of the Parti libéral du Québec or the Union Nationale had no interest in seeing either men charged. Cédilot and Noël wrote that Courville and Cotroni were "hired indiscriminately by both the Liberal Party and the Union Nationale, the two goons drove voters out of the polling stations with baseball bats".

In 1941, Courville and Cotroni opened up Faison Doré and Café Royal. Courville was one of the principal owners of illegal gaming houses in Montreal and became very wealthy. The Faison Doré became one of the favorite meeting spots for gangsters, judges, lawyers and politicians in Montreal. The Faison Doré was the most popular nightclub in Montreal between the 1940s-1960s due to its charismatic emcee, Jacques Normand, and the galaxy of European stars who played there such as Charles Aznavour, Tino Rossi, Charles Trenet, and Luis Mariano. The Faison Doré was also the place where a number of French-Canadian stars such as Roger Baulu, Raymond Lévesque, Denise Filiatrault, Fernand Gignac and Monique Leyrac began their careers. The Faison Doré had the seating capacity for 600 people at any given moment, and the clientele included "office workers and taxi drivers, judges and lawyers, university professors and doctors" as both Courville and Cotroni had a reputation for promoting la chanson française at a time when many French-Canadians felt that their culture was being denigrated.

Courville was Cotroni's most trusted partner, and the two were very active in running bookmaking, gambling and prostitution rackets. Montreal had a reputation at the time as "Canada's Sin City" and attracted many American tourists who enjoyed visiting a city that did not have the same puritanical rules and atmosphere that were the norm in American cities and in English-speaking Canadian cities. During the Second World War, Montreal had so prostitutes that both the U.S. Army and U.S. Navy tried to discourage servicemen from visiting Montreal under the grounds that visits to Montreal almost always resulted in the said servicemen contracting venereal diseases, which added to Montreal reputation as the "Sin City of the North". Cotroni and Courville soon attracted the attention of "the Commission" of New York as both Lucky Luciano and Meyer Lanksy made it clear that they wanted a share of Montreal's rackets. For their part, Cotroni had forged an alliance with a number of French gangsters, most notably Antoine D'Agostino to smuggle heroin from Marseilles into Montreal. As the population of the United States is much greater than Canada, the market for heroin was accordingly greater. An alliance was soon made with the New York Mafia where in exchange for heroin being smuggled into the United States, a share of the profits from the Montreal rackets would go to "the Commission". The influence of the Cotroni family increased in the 1950s when an alliance was made with the Bonanno family of New York.

Courville remained active as a wrestling promoter and recruited Maurice Vachon into professional wrestling after he won a gold medal in wrestling at the 1950 British Empire Games in Auckland, New Zealand. After winning the gold medal, Vachon worked as a bouncer in various Montreal bars, but found that too many men wanted to fight him in order to say they had defeated the man who had won a gold medal in wrestling. Vachon recalled: "Courville told me once if the guys weren't able to defeat me with their fists, they would do so with a weapon. It was getting dangerous for me to work in clubs. That was when he introduced me to professional wrestling". Under Courville's guidance, Vachon debuted in the pseudo-sport of professional wrestling in 1951, starting a career that would see him become of the most famous wrestlers in the United States.

=== Tainted meat merchant ===
In 1967, Courville became notorious as one of the gangsters responsible for supplying the tainted meat that was sold in the concession stands for the visitors to Expo 67, through he was never charged despite the outrage about the damage the scandal did to Montreal's reputation. Besides for Courville, the other owners of Reggio Foods were Vic Cotroni, Paolo Violi, and Salvatore Sorrentino. The meat that Reggio Foods purchased was from animals that had died of diseases and was not fit for consumption by dogs, let alone humans. In 1973, the firm of Reggio Foods (which was owned by Courville) supplied the meat at the Quebec Summer Games, which caused so many athletes to become seriously ill after eating the meat that the games had to be cancelled. The Quebec health authorities seized 20,000 pounds of meat from Reggio Foods, which turned out to be decaying horse meat with the labels saying it was unfit for human consumption having been ripped off. In 1975, Courville was described in a newspaper report as being "about five feet in height" and "about the same in circumference" with "cauliflower ears and slicked-back greying hair".

In May 1975, a royal commission known as the Commission d'Enquête sur le Crime Organisé started public hearings into the scandal of the tainted meat being sold in Montreal's grocery stores, leading to a report being issued The Fraudulent Marketing of Meat Unfit for Consumption and Fraud in Connection with Horse Meat. The report named Reggio Foods as the firm responsible for supplying the tainted meat. Through Courville escaped being indicted, the firm of Reggio Foods was shut down for its gross violations of the food safety laws later in 1975. In 1977, Courville testified at the Commission d'Enquête sur le Crime Organisé: "If the Mafia exists in Montreal, it's probably like the Knights of Columbus". Courville also testified to the commission that he was "the official business agent" of "my friend" Cotroni. The same year, the royal commission named Courville as "without doubt one of the most influential and respected non-Italian partners of the Cotroni-Violi family". As a non-Italian, Courville could never be a "made man" within the Cotroni family, but he was Vic Cotroni's closest friend and adviser.

In the 1970s, Courville helped recruit his nephew Réal Simard to work as a hitman for Cotroni's younger brother, Frank Cotroni. Courville died of natural cause in 1991, a wealthy and free man.

== Books ==
- Auger, Michel; Edwards, Peter (2004). The Encyclopedia of Canadian Organized Crime: From Captain Kidd to Mom Boucher. Toronto: McClelland & Stewart. ISBN 0771030495.
- Cédilot, André; Noël, André (2012). Mafia Inc.: The Long, Bloody Reign of Canada's Sicilian Clan. Toronto: Vintage Canada. ISBN 9780307360410.
- Laprade, Pat; Hebert, Bertrand (2013). Mad Dogs, Midgets And Screw Jobs The Untold Story of How Montreal Shaped the World of Wrestling. Toronto: Ecw Press. ISBN 9781770902961.
- Nevada, Vance (2022). (Un)Controlled Chaos Canada's Remarkable Professional Wrestling Legacy. Altona: Friesen Press. ISBN 9781039154810.
- Schneider, Stephen (2009). Iced The Story of Organized Crime in Canada. Toronto: John Wiley & Sons. ISBN 9780470835005.
