= Frank Shoofey =

Canadian criminal lawyer (1941–1985)

Franklin Dimitrios Shoofey (1941 – 15 October 1985) was a prominent criminal lawyer in Canada who was active in the Quebec Liberal Party. In a still-unsolved murder, he was shot to death while working late at his Montreal law office.

== Early history and professional background ==
Shoofey was born in Montreal and grew up in a downtown working-class neighbourhood. Shoofey's parents were Lebanese Christian immigrants. His mother wanted to name him after the U.S. President Franklin Delano Roosevelt, whom she greatly admired, but the local Greek Orthodox priest told her it was obligatory to name a child after a saint, hence the name Franklin Dimitrios. When he was aged seventeen, his father died and he had to work to support his mother and put himself through school. Shoofey sold encyclopedias, insurance and furnaces as a law student. He failed his bar examinations for civil law, which led to switch over to studying criminal law.! He studied at McGill University, obtaining a BA in 1961 and a BCL in 1964. He eventually became a partner in the law firm of Shoofey, Morneau, Blais, Rolland, Pariseau and Poupart. A flamboyant, colorful character, Shoofey soon became one of the best known lawyers in Montreal.

Shoofey admitted that 90% of his clients were guilty of the crimes they had been accused of, but argued that everyone deserved a defense counsel. Shoofey told a journalist: "Some crimes revolt me. I won't take it if it's a senseless offense, like the murder or rape of a little child. No one forces us to take a case. But if you take it, you must do your best...Many lawyers don't. Some take a client's money and don't show up in court. Any lawyer who gets threats from the underworld usually deserves them". Shoofey was a workaholic who enjoyed working 16 to 18 hours per day for his clients, saying that his clients were entitled to expect him to work as hard as possible for their acquittal. Shoofey was known for his tendency to grandstand in court and for "withering" cross-examinations of witnesses for the prosecution on the stand. An ambitious man, Shoofey wanted to enter politics as he saw himself as the champion of the poor, and viewed his legal career as a stepping-stone to a political career.

== Underworld clients ==
Shoofey's clients included gangster Richard Blass, who was killed in a police raid in 1975, and four men apprehended for the 1978 murder of Montreal "Godfather" Paolo Violi. Shoofey later wrote a book about Blass, and told The Gazette newspaper (Montreal) that many of his clients: "were a special group of people living by their own rules … in their own closed society".

== Hostage negotiator ==
Police often used Shoofey to help negotiate in hostage situations. In the last such occurrence, Shoofey was called in to assure an escaped prisoner that police would not abuse him if he surrendered. After a prolonged stand-off, the gunman released his hostage and gave himself up to police.

== Henry Morgentaler and Reggie Chartrand ==
In the two months before his death, Shoofey began an action against famous abortion provider Dr. Henry Morgentaler. The action was sought by client Reggie Chartrand, an ex-boxer, staunch Quebec separatist, and an activist opposed to abortion. Chartrand wanted abortion charges laid based on evidence contained in two National Film Board productions, which allegedly showed Morgentaler performing an abortion. Chartrand continued the effort after Shoofey's death, but failed when justice of the peace Michel Breton decided against laying charges.

== Brother André's heart ==
In 1974, Shoofey played a role in recovering the preserved heart of Brother André Bessette (now Saint André Bessette), which had been stolen from Saint Joseph's Oratory. The religious relic was missing for more than a year when Shoofey received an anonymous telephone call telling him its location. Shoofey and police went to the basement of an apartment building where they found a reliquary containing the heart in a locker, the seal on the reliquary still unbroken. At the time, Brother André was being considered for sainthood by the Catholic Church, his canonization eventually occurring on October 17, 2010.

== Advocate for the poor ==
Shoofey often aided the poor, sponsoring Christmas benefits, raising money for families of crime victims, and opening a community centre that provided job information and legal aid. He also took the case of a paraplegic pencil peddler who was jailed for begging. Shoofey secured his release, making comments critical of a society that forced him to beg.

== Liberal Party connections ==
Shoofey tried three times to obtain the nomination for the Quebec Liberal Party in the working-class Saint-Jacques riding. However, party officials pushed him aside, fearing that some of his past associations would be a political liability.

== The Bernier Commission ==
Starting in October 1984, a Royal Commission under Justice Raymond Bernier started to examine allegations of Mafia influence within boxing in Quebec. When Bernier presented his report in March 1986, he concluded that the boxing industry was systemically corrupt and under the control of the gangster Frank Cotroni, whom the report called "the guiding spirit" of boxing in Quebec. The report also stated that Cotroni had control of the Hilton family, stating that Cotroni paid all of the bills for David Hilton Sr. including his rent, groceries, insurance, clothing and furniture. Hilton Sr. was a chronic alcoholic and several boxing officials testified at the commission that Cotroni's presence was necessary at boxing matches because he was the only man capable of controlling Hilton Sr. The report stated that the Cotroni had advised the elder Hilton to accept a contract on behalf of his sons with the American boxing promoter Don King, citing a police wiretap of a phone call where Cotroni told Hilton to have his sons sign with King because the contract was a "good one". Shoofey, the lawyer for the Hiltons, was excluded from the talks between Cotroni and King. Shoofey himself testified at the Bernier commission, saying: "Polo is the sport of aristocrats and boxing is for bums". Shoofey told the journalist James Christie of The Globe & Mail newspaper in February 1985 that he was opposed to the contract the Hiltons signed with King, saying: "I would have much tougher with the promoter. I would have gotten a million-dollar guarantee for the boys, with big bonuses up front".

Shoofey believed that Cotroni had tricked the Hiltons into signing an unfavorable contract with King, and wrote a letter to the Quebec Sports Minister Guy Chevrette asking him to set up an agency to regulate boxing together with kick-boxing and wrestling to end Cotroni's influence on sports in Quebec. In his last interview shortly before his murder, Shoofey told Christie: "When Willie Mays or Mickey Mantle wanted to accept jobs with casinos, they were told they had to quit their association with baseball. But Cotroni had been like a fixture [in boxing] and it seemed to be tolerated not only by the Hiltons, but the Montreal Athletic Commission, and by the police. Nobody came up and warned them. If everyone accepted this situation, why blame the Hiltons?"

Shoofey represented the boxing Hilton family, spending part of his last evening alive at a Montreal Athletic Commission hearing trying to prevent American boxing promoter Don King from co-promoting a Matthew Hilton bout. The Hiltons were shaken by Shoofey's death, and considered him like family.

== Murder ==
Late on Tuesday, October 15, 1985, an unknown assailant murdered Shoofey in the hallway outside his fifth-floor law office, shooting him multiple times. Shortly afterwards The Gazette received a telephone call from a man claiming to be with the "Red Army Liberation Front", saying: "I and my colleagues have just assassinated Frank Shoofey. Good riddance." However, the Canadian Security Intelligence Service had not heard of a group by this name, and a spokesman suggested that the call may have been an attempt to throw off the investigation. Crime writers Peter Edwards and Michel Auger later wrote: "it was likely that mobsters, not some unknown political group, were the killers of Shoofey". This is further supported by a 2009 book, The Contract, by Claude Grant, a legal colleague who articled under Shoofey. Grant said that there was word in underworld circles of a contract on Shoofey's life about a year before the actual murder, that Shoofey was warned of the matter, but dismissed it as hearsay. Grant himself went into hiding for a period of time after Shoofey's death, fearing his own life to be in danger.

One of Shoofey's law partners who did not wished to be named stated "We all thought that it [Shoofey's murder] was because of his involvement with the Hiltons", whom she called "a really bad family". She added: "I think their [the Hiltons] involvement with Don King led to Frank's killing". However, she added that unlike his rival Sidney Leithman that Shoofey was not involved in organized crime, saying that Shoofey "can be reproached for a lot of things" such as wearing "a terrible toupee", but that he was "a health nut who ate grapes and other health food". She stated that Shoofey did not abuse drugs and was not involved in the sort of shady dealings that Leithman engaged in.

The hitman Réal Simard accused Cotroni of ordering Shoofey's murder. According to Simard, Cotroni-who was faced with an extradition request from the United States to face charges in Connecticut for trafficking in heroin-and he wanted to sell the Hilton contract to King to raise some money for his legal defense as his lawyer Leithman fought the extradition request in the courts ferociously. Simard stated that Cotroni had wanted to sell the Hilton contract to King as early as 1983, but that Shoofey was the main obstacle who kept blocking the deal, saying the King contract was an exploitative one and Cotroni was not acting in the best interests of the Hiltons. Simard stated that Shoofey was killed because some "very powerful people" in Montreal wanted King to have the Hilton contract and that: "Frank Shoofey was very disturbing for them. Because he was helping the Hilton brothers". Simard also put forward another theory, saying: "The first one is the boxers. The second one is about a lawyer who was involved in some, well, love affair. Who apparently put a contract on Shoofey's life". Commander André Bouchard of the Montreal police stated in 2010: "...Cotroni and his gang had nothing with his [Shoofey's] killing...It was something else completely different. We know who killed him. But he's in a jail right now and he'll be in jail for 25 years, because we got him on something else". Bouchard stated that Shoofey was killed for "the craziest reason in the world. Everybody thinks it's because of the boxing, but that's bullshit".

In an obituary in the Globe & Mail, Kirk Makin wrote: "Mr. Shoofey was a shameless publicity hound, but also a social benefactor of the highest order. His presence was a must on radio talk shows. He played Santa Claus at Christmas parties for urchins and bought sports equipment for inner-city children".

== Books ==
- Auger, Michel; Edwards, Peter (2004). The Encyclopedia of Canadian Organized Crime: From Captain Kidd to Mom Boucher. Toronto: McClelland & Stewart. ISBN 978-0771030499.
- Edwards, Peter (1990). Blood Brothers: How Canada's Most Powerful Mafia Family Runs Its Business. Toronto: Key Porter Books. ISBN 155013213X.
- O'Connor, D'Arcy (2011). Montreal's Irish Mafia: The True Story of the Infamous West End Gang. Toronto: John Wiley & Sons.

== See also ==
- List of unsolved murders (1980–1999)
