= Vincenzo Cotroni =

Italian-Canadian mobster (1911–1984)

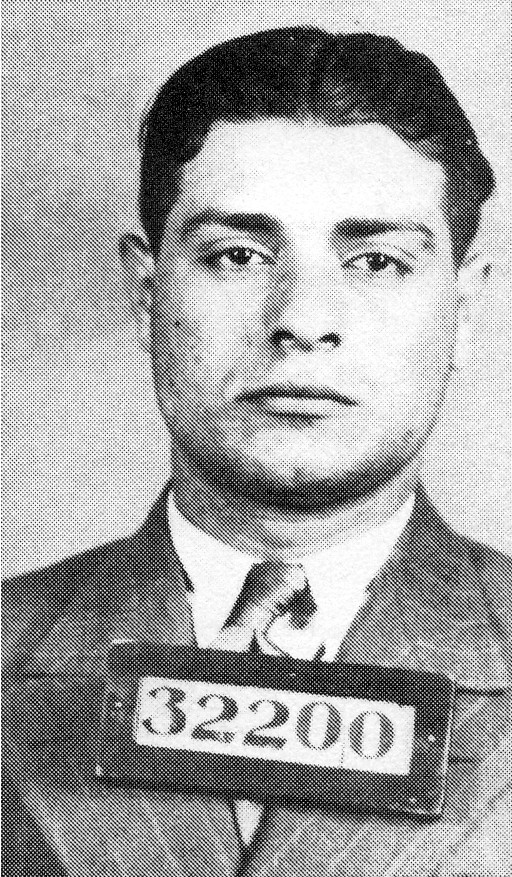
- Born: Vincenzo Cotrone; 1911; Mammola, Calabria, Italy
- Died: 16 September 1984 (aged 72–73); Montreal, Quebec, Canada
- Resting place: Notre Dame des Neiges Cemetery, Côte-des-Neiges–Notre-Dame-de-Grâce, Montreal
- Other names: "Vic Cotroni"; "Vic Vincent"; "The Egg"; "The Godfather of Montreal"
- Occupation: Crime boss
- Spouse: Maria Bresciano (m. 1928)
- Children: 2
- Relatives: Frank Cotroni (brother); Dino Bravo (nephew-in-law)
- Allegiance: Bonanno crime family Cotroni crime family
- Conviction: Extortion (1975)
- Penalty: Six years' imprisonment; served six months on appeal

Vincenzo "Vic" Cotroni (Italian: [vinˈtʃɛntso koˈtroːni]; born Vincenzo Cotrone; Italian: [koˈtroːne]; 1911 – 16 September 1984), also known as "The Egg", was an Italian Canadian crime boss and founder of the Cotroni crime family in Montreal, Quebec.

Cotroni was born in 1911 in Mammola, Calabria, Italy. In 1924, he immigrated to Montreal. In his early life, he worked as a professional wrestler under the name "Vic Vincent." By the age of 20, Cotroni had accumulated a lengthy record of minor offences, bootlegging with local bootlegger Armand Courville. In 1928, Cotroni was charged with rape against Maria Bresciano. The charge was dropped when Maria agreed to marry him in May 1928, and later had a child, Rosina.

Throughout his life, Cotroni kept a low profile. In 1974, he was subpoenaed to stand before a Quebec government commission inquiry into organized crime and was jailed for one year for contempt. The following year, Cotroni and his capodecina Paolo Violi, along with Hamilton, Ontario mobster Johnny Papalia, were convicted of extortion and sentenced to six years in prison; Cotroni's sentence was later reduced on appeal to just six months.

In the late 1970s, Cotroni transferred control of the day-to-day activities of the family to Violi, together with his brother Frank Cotroni, Nicolas DiIorio, and Luigi Greco. A power struggle between the Calabrians led by Violi and a Sicilian faction led by Nicolo Rizzuto soon broke out; in the mob war that followed the Sicilian Rizzuto crime family emerged as the preeminent crime family in Montreal by the early 1980s. Cotroni died of cancer on 16 September 1984.

== Early life ==
Cotroni was born in 1911 in Mammola, Calabria, Italy. The precise spelling of his surname remains unknown as Italian, American and Canadian records variously spell his surname as Cotroni, Controne, Coutroni, Catrino, Catroni, and Citroini. Cotroni was illiterate for his entire life and never gave a precise spelling of his surname. His tombstone gives his surname as Cotrone, but the Cotroni surname came to be the one most preferred by journalists and court officials, and this became the accepted spelling of his surname.

His family left Italy for the United States and later came to Canada. In 1924, he immigrated to Montreal, Quebec, Canada with his two sisters, Marguerita and Palmina, and his brother Giuseppe; his two other brothers, Frank and Michel, were later born in Montreal. Cotroni became a Canadian citizen in 1929.

Cotroni grew up in a house at the junction of Ontario and St. Timotheé streets in Le Plateau-Mont-Royal (now in Montreal), a poor neighbourhood that more affluent Italian immigrants avoided because of its high crime rate. His father, Nicodemo, was a carpenter whose average weekly income was $35.

By 1924, Montreal had been a key centre in the business of bootlegging, forming a crucial link in the smuggling network running south from Montreal to New York City and the other cities of the American Northeast. Quebec was the only province in Canada that did not ban alcohol, and for much of the 1920s Quebec was the only place north of the Rio Grande where it was possible to legally drink alcohol. Members of the Cotroni family had moved to Montreal to take part in bootlegging and were repeatedly arrested during the Prohibition era for smuggling alcohol into the United States.

Rather than attend school, Vic Cotroni worked briefly as a carpenter and then as a professional wrestler under the name "Vic Vincent." By the age of 20, Cotroni had accumulated a lengthy record of minor offences, including theft, possession of counterfeit money, and assault and battery, as well as bootlegging with local bootlegger Armand Courville.

== Criminal career ==
=== Wrestler and hoodlum ===
Montreal was notorious during the interwar period as one of the most corrupt cities in the world and for being a global centre of drug smuggling and prostitution. French police reports from the 1930s listed Montreal as the world's third most "depraved" city, after only Port Said and Marseille. In 1936, the mayor of Montreal, Adhémar Raynault, estimated that Montreal's vice industry was worth $200 million per annum, making the vice business one of Montreal's largest industries.

Cotroni flourished as a gangster in this climate. As an young man, Cotroni spent much of his time working as a guard and a bouncer in various gambling houses and bars, becoming involved in organized crime in the late 1920s. Courville served as a mentor to Cotroni, teaching him professional wrestling .

In 1928, Cotroni was charged with rape against Maria Bresciano, but the charge was dropped when Maria agreed to marry him in May 1928, and later had a child, Rosina. As an young man, Cotroni was deeply influenced by the 'ndranghetista subculture of his native Calabria, whose ethos stressed an ultra-aggressive, almost mindlessly macho persona for 'ndranghetisti, who proved their virility, strength and dominance over men through violence, most notably by castrating rival men. 'Ndranghetisti were expected to be just as sexually aggressive as physically aggressive and could never accept a refusal of sexual advances, which would question his sense of machismo. The Italian sociologist Pino Arlacchi wrote about the 'ndranghetista subculture, "Except among relatives, the two sexes represented qualities in constant antagonism: the uomo di rispetto ("man worthy of respect") had the task of demonstrating his virility at every opportunity, even if this meant committing violence against women or seizing them by force." Peter Edwards, the crime correspondent of The Toronto Star, wrote that Cotroni was almost certainly guilty of raping Maria Bresciano, who had rejected his offer of marriage, which he took as a humiliation that questioned his sense of machismo, which in turn required an act of extreme violence to prove his virility and strength as a man.

Likewise, Edwards wrote that it was the same need to dominate others that led Cotroni to work as a professional wrestler under the ring name of Vic Vincent, as he wanted to prove his machismo by demonstrating his strength and fierceness as a brawler who apparently won victories over other men in front of thousands of people. The fact that the matches were staged in the pseudo-sport of professional wrestling was not widely known in the 1930s, and many believed that the wrestling matches were authentic bouts.

In 1938, Cotroni retired from professional wrestling, but he remained fond of his Vic Vincent persona as he continued to use Vic Vincent as an alias as late as the 1960s. Cotroni was uncle by marriage to professional wrestler Dino Bravo, believed by authorities to be involved in his organization for some time.

Cotroni was involved in the 1930s in "baseball bat elections", where he served as "muscle" for the Quebec Liberal Party and the Union Nationale, beating up supporters of rival parties and stuffing ballot boxes. As a result, the Cotroni family enjoyed the protection of Quebec politicians for decades afterwards, while Cotroni and Courville acquired reputations that were to last for decades.

As the 1930s went on, Cotroni became increasingly prosperous, as his taste in clothes became more and more expensive. As Cotroni aged and he became the uomo di rispetto he always aspired to be, he became more quiet, modest and introspective as he sought to avoid the limelight. However, though Cotroni presented himself as an illiterate pepperoni salesman to pizzerias, he still maintained the reputation of being a terrifying figure capable of extreme violence. Cotroni's unofficial title of Le Parrain de Montreal ("the Godfather of Montreal") guaranteed him the respect that he felt was due to him.

In 1940, Cotroni escaped internment despite being born in Italy. During the interwar period, i Figli d'Italia ("the Sons of Italy"), a group linked to the Grand Fascist Party, attempted to mobilize support for the Fascist regime in Montreal's Italian Canadian community. Unlike the other provinces, where the Royal Canadian Mounted Police (RCMP) interned all Italian immigrants, only those who belonged to the Sons of Italy group were interned in Quebec. As Cotroni had never belonged to the Sons of Italy group, he was allowed to remain at liberty.

In 1941, Cotroni and Courville bought a bar and nightclub, "Au Faisan Doré" and the "Café Royal". Au Faisan Doré was the most popular nightclub in Montreal between the 1940s and 1960s, due to a charismatic emcee, Jacques Normand, alongside the galaxy of European stars who performed shows, with the most popular being Charles Aznavour, Tino Rossi, Charles Trenet and Luis Mariano. Au Faisan Doré was moreover the nightclub where numerous future French Canadian stars such as Roger Baulu, Raymond Lévesque, Denise Filiatrault, Fernand Gignac and Monique Leyrac began their careers. Though Courville and Cotroni both had thuggish reputations, the ownership of Au Faisan Doré and their sponsorship of la chanson française gave them the reputation of promoters of culture.

Cotroni had a gangster, Harry Ship, rent an office next to Au Faisan Doré, which was a 24-hour center for gambling. Ship's office was equipped with ticker-tape machines reporting the results of sports events and horse races while bookies took bets from anyone willing to phone in.

=== Decina boss ===
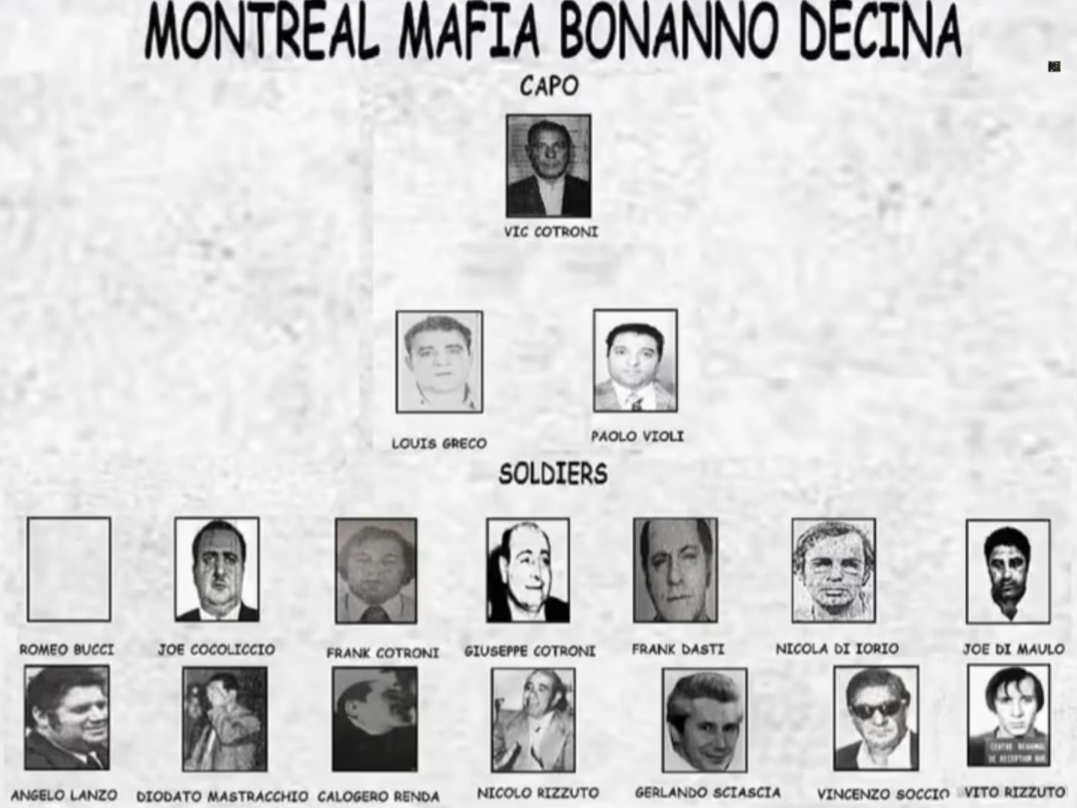
RCMP chart of the Bonanno crime family's crew (decina) in Montreal

In 1953, Carmine "Lilo" Galante, an influential member of the New York City-based Bonanno crime family, arrived in Montreal and worked with Cotroni. Galante planned to make Montreal a pivotal location in the importation of heroin from overseas for distribution in New York City and across the United States in the French Connection. Police also estimated that Galante was collecting gambling profits in Montreal worth about $50 million per year.

Cotroni was close to Galante, with whom he was constantly seen. Edwards wrote that in the early 1950s Cotroni "...was a significant but not a dominant force in the Montreal underworld and an éminence grise of the arts scene who was credited with launching the careers of several Québécoise folk singers." When the owner of a nightclub, Solomon "Solly" Schnapp, refused to allow prostitutes working for Galante in his nightclub, Cotroni and his associates destroyed Schnapp's club with sledgehammers and baseball bats, causing $30,000 in damage.

Cotroni's association with Galante elevated his importance in the underworld and gave him the connections with New York that he always wanted. Galante formally established the Bonanno family decina in Montreal and made Cotroni his chief lieutenant.

Montreal became a key smuggling point in the French Connection smuggling ring. Opium grown in the "Golden Crescent" nations of Afghanistan, Pakistan and Iran was smuggled via Turkey to Marseille, where the gangsters of le Milieu converted the opium into heroin. From Marseille, the heroin was smuggled into North America with Montreal being one of the chief entry points. Cotroni's nightclub, Au Faisan Doré, was listed as the mailing address for Antonio D'Agostino, a French Corsican gangster known as one of France's most powerful heroin smugglers.

In 1954, Cotroni tried to prevent the election of the reformist candidate, Jean Drapeau, as Mayor of Montreal, using violence and stuffed election boxes full of false ballots. Drapeau still won the election and one of his first acts was to appoint an incorruptible policeman Pacifique Roy "Pax" Plante as the police chief of Montreal. Plante in return pressured the federal government to deport Galante, as he noted that Galante had no official source of income or a job.

In April 1956, due to Galante's strong-arm extortion tactics, the Canadian government deported him back to the United States. Bonanno replaced Galante with Salvatore "Little Sal" Giglio as his Montreal agent. In the 1957 municipal election, the Cotroni family joined forces with the Union Nationale government of Premier Maurice Duplessis against Drapeau, who was running for reelection. Drapeau was the victim of attempted murder when a car driven by Cotroni soldiers tried to run him over; the campaign headquarters of Drapeau was smashed up by Cotroni family thugs; and the president of the anti-corruption group, the Civic Action League, Reuben Lévesque, was beaten bloody in public by Cotroni's thugs. Despite all the violence, to ensure the victory of the pro-corruption candidate, former Liberal MP Sarto Fournier, it was still necessary to provide 20,000 false ballots to allow Fournier to win the election. One of Fournier's first acts as mayor was to demote and then fire Plante as police chief and replace him with a more venal man. Cotroni was said to have placed a contract on Plante's life. Believing his life to be in danger, Plante fled to a remote village in Mexico. As corruption boomed again in Montreal, the federal government deported Giglio after he was found with 240 Cuban cigars that he failed to declare at customs when he returned from a vacation in Cuba. Bonanno appointed Cotroni as his new Montreal agent.

Edwards has written that Cotroni was just a glorified "branch plant manager" who took his orders from New York and that the Cotroni family was only the Canadian decina of the Bonanno family of New York, instead of being a crime family in its own right. Edwards wrote, "While Cotroni's operation was a branch plant, it was big league by Canadian standards, and any young man serving under him could expect to serve a five-year apprenticeship before being considered a full family member. They then became part of something huge. When the police peeked into the bank account of one of Cotroni's four main money-launders, they found it had been the conduit for no less than $83 million. And during the heyday of Cotroni's illegal gambling rackets, police estimated his American bosses siphoned off some $50 million yearly as their cut." Marvin Elkind, the former chauffeur to Jimmy Hoffa, served as Cotroni's chauffeur in the 1950s, which was the source of immense pride for Cotroni as it showed his importance. Elkind recalled that he drove Cotroni to meet gangsters, politicians, lawyers, policemen, journalists, civil servants and customs agents. The most important of Cotroni's contacts was Hilaire Beauregard, the director of the Sûreté du Québec whom Cotroni met on a regular basis. Elkind recalled that Cotroni jokingly called William "Willie Obie" Obront "the butcher" on the account of him owning a deli and because people kept dying from eating the rotten meat that Obront sold.

As Cotroni entered middle age, he delegated the enforcement duties to his younger brother, Frank, who was 20 years his junior and who very much resembled him in his younger years in his willingness to use violence. In November 1959, another of Cotroni's brothers, Giuseppe "Pep" Cotroni, was convicted of heroin trafficking due to the efforts of a charismatic Crown Attorney, Jean-Paul St. Marie, at the time an avowed enemy of the Cotroni family. In April 1960, St. Marie again prosecuted "Pep" Cotroni, this time for his role in the largest bank robbery in Canada adjusted for inflation, namely the theft of $9 million from the Brockville Trust & Savings bank in May 1958. Once again, the case ended with "Pep" Cotroni being found guilty. Two thugs arrived at the office of the Italian language Montreal newspaper Cittandino Canadese to warn the editors that it was "not respectable" to publish stories about "Pep" Cotroni. Nick Chamara, the editor of Cittandino Canadese, boldly chose to defy Cotroni, saying that "publicity is my best weapon."

By the 1960s, Cotroni owned a limousine, a duplex in Rosemont, and a brand new home in Lavaltrie. The house, built in 1959, featured marble floors, a large conference room, a walk-in industrial sized refrigerator, a built-in movie screen, six bathrooms, and crystal chandeliers. The conference hall in his Lavaltrie house had a huge, handcrafted walnut board table with the words "Italia" carved on the chairs on the head and the foot while all of the other chairs featured the names and crests of the Italian regions. The conference hall had a huge window overlooking the St. Lawrence River and led out to a sundeck supported by a type of 24 inch steel beams normally used in bridge construction. All of the guest rooms had views facing the St. Lawrence and all had walk-in closets and ensuite bathrooms decorated with white marble. Cotroni also donated large sums of money to Montreal churches and charities, and later fathered a second child—this time, a son, Nicodemo, named after his father, with his French-Canadian mistress.

In 1964, Cotroni was faced with a dilemma when his boss, Joseph Bonanno challenged the Commission, the governing board of the American Mafia. Bonanno had been a founding member of the Commission in 1931, but fell out in the early 1960s with three fellow Commission members, namely Carlo Gambino and Tommy Lucchese of New York, and Stefano Magaddino of Buffalo, whose murders he had plotted. Bonanno was ordered to appear before the Commission to explain himself, but he instead fled to Montreal.

Bonanno's unwanted arrival placed Cotroni into the impossible situation of having to either serve his boss, Bonanno, or the Commission, both of which he wanted to be loyal to. The Commission were willing to forgive Bonanno for his breach of their rules and wanted him to return to New York. Several times, New Jersey boss Sam "The Plumber" DeCavalcante was sent north to Montreal to ask Bonanno to return to New York, only for Bonanno to declare that he no longer recognized the authority of the Commission, a situation that DeCavalacante likened to the possibility of "World War III" breaking out.

Cotroni's efforts at remaining neutral were much strained. Magaddino saw Bonanno's presence in Montreal as signalling an intention to move into his turf of southern Ontario, and led to threats from Buffalo that Cotroni should disassociate himself with Bonanno if he wanted to live.

Much to Cotroni's relief, Bonanno was deported from Canada in the summer of 1964. A police wiretap at DeCavalcante's office in Kenilworth, New Jersey showed the latter talking on 23 December 1964, with Bonanno family member Joe Notaro at length about Cotroni. Notaro told DeCavalcante, "They want to be left alone. I said, 'All right, convey the message to Vic that as of this night, as far as we are concerned, they are at liberty to do what they want'. When we get this ironed out, we go talk to them." A Bonanno family caporegime, Gaspar DiGregorio, had broken away to declare his loyalty to the Commission. The police wire recorded that DeCavalcante asked Notaro, "How many people remain that are not with Gasparino?" Notaro replied that 25 remained loyal to Bonanno including five caporegimes, one of whom Notaro named as "Vic from Montreal."

On 28 November 1966, a delegation of New York Mafia leaders led by Bonanno's son, Salvatore "Bill" Bonanno, together with Carl Simari, Peter Magaddino, Vito De Filippo, Peter Notaro and Pat De Filippo, arrived in Montreal to talk with Cotroni about the upcoming Expo 67. The Montreal police pulled over Bonanno's car and found three loaded handguns, leading him and the rest of his party to be deported to the United States for the illegal ownership of guns.

Magaddino was "mad like a beast" when he learned of the Bonanno–Cotroni meeting, leading Cotroni to send a message that the meeting had not been planned by him. Cotroni declined Magaddino's offer to see him in Buffalo about the matter. Giacomo Luppino of Hamilton, who was one of the few people Magaddino respected, intervened to talk the Buffalo boss out of his plans to kill Cotroni. Luppino, in a successful attempt to play the peacemaker, worked out an agreement under which his son-in-law, Paolo Violi, who had moved to Montreal in 1963, would be a Cotroni family underboss in exchange for Magaddino cancelling his plans to kill Cotroni, who would continue to work for Bonanno.

Magaddino always saw Violi as his "beachhead" in Montreal who would ultimately allow him to add Quebec to his Canadian territories and in the process weaken his hated rivals, the Bonanno family. Violi for his part was contemptuous of both Bonanno and Magaddino. Violi told Luppino's son, Jimmy, in a 1967 phone call wiretapped by the police that he thought that the Cotroni family should declare its independence and set itself up as a crime family in its own right.

In the 1960s and 1970s, Cotroni used associate William Obront to supervise a bookmaking network in the Ottawa-Hull area that handled around $50,000 in bets per day, with 25 per cent going to Paolo Violi. Obie also served as Cotroni's chief banker and financial adviser, responsible for laundering money. For Expo 67, Obie also helped the Cotronis land the meat and vending machine supply contract. Most of the meat he supplied was tainted.

=== The October Crisis ===
Starting in September 1969, Frank D'Asti of the Cotroni family contributed heavily to the leadership bid of Pierre Laporte to be the leader of the Quebec Liberal Party. On 16 April 1970, Laporte met with D'Asti and Nicolo di Iorio of the Cotroni family. On 3 May 1970, a police wiretap recorded di Iori and D'Asti expressing the hope that Laporte be appointed the Quebec Attorney General.

In August 1970, Cotroni went to Acapulco, Mexico to attend a "crime summit" attended by gangsters from Canada, the United States and France to discuss how to take advantage of the plans to legalize casinos in Quebec. The plan was to take over the casinos to use them as fronts for money laundering. The subject was considered so important that Meyer Lansky served as the chairman of the conference, representing "the Commission."

On 5 October 1970, James Cross, the British trade commissioner in Montreal, was kidnapped by the Front de libération du Québec (FLQ), starting what is known as the October Crisis. On 8 October 1970, the FLQ Manifesto was read out on national television and radio in both English and French in an attempt to buy time for Cross, whom the FLQ had threatened to execute unless their manifesto was broadcast.

The manifesto singled out as one of the exploiters of the French Canadian working class "the election-riggers Simard–Cotroni." The reference to Simard was to a wealthy French Canadian family of shipbuilders. The Premier of Quebec, Robert Bourassa, was married to Andrée Simard, and was often accused of favouring the Simard family. The manifesto stated that violence was acceptable means of winning Quebec independence because "The Liberal Party's victory was nothing, but the victory of the election-riggers, Simard–Cotroni. As a result, the British parliamentary system is finished and the Front de Libération du Québec will never allow itself to be distracted by the pseudo-elections that the Anglo-Saxon capitalists toss to the people of Quebec every four years."

Cotroni was a well known supporter of the Parti libéral du Québec. Cotroni was said to have been enraged by the manifesto, which drew national attention upon himself in a very unflattering way.

On 10 October 1970, Pierre Laporte, the Quebec Labour Minister, was kidnapped by the FLQ. Laporte was close to the Cotroni family, and the FLQ kidnapped him in part in order to draw attention to the links between the Cotroni family and the Parti libéral du Québec. The FLQ planned to force Laporte to write out a "confession" of his crimes, which would be a "Magna Carta of corruption" that was intended to discredit the Parti libéral du Québec.

Acting on behalf of their boss, two of Cotroni's capos, Frank D'Asti and Nicolo di Iorio, approached Laporte's right-hand man, René Gagnon, with an offer of help. Both D'Asti and di Iorio stated that their family had an idea of where Laporte was being held and were willing to rescue him, an offer that Gagnon promptly accepted. On 16 October 1970, Laporte tried to escape by smashing his body through the window of the house where he was being held in, but his leg chains left him dangling in the air. Bleeding badly as the broken glass had severed several arteries, it was clear that Laporte would die soon if he was not taken to a hospital; rather than free him, his FLQ captors instead strangled him to death on 17 October. Just minutes after Gagnon accepted the offer of help from D'Asti and di Iorio, he heard on the radio that Laporte's corpse had just been discovered. The perception that the Bourassa government was soft on organized crime led Bourassa to perform a U-turn on his plans for legalizing casinos, which were not legalized after all, thereby rendering the Acapulco crime summit moot.

=== Libel suit ===
In 1963, when Maclean's magazine had referred to him as the "godfather" of Montreal, Cotroni sued the magazine company for $1.25 million in damages. Cotroni's choice of a lawyer, Jean-Paul Ste. Marie, greatly shocked the courtroom for Ste. Marie had once served as a Crown Attorney who had successfully prosecuted Cotroni's brother, Giuseppe "Pep" Cotroni, for heroin trafficking in 1959 and for bank robbery in 1960. When asked why had he had chosen the man who sent his brother to prison as his counsel, Cotroni stated that St. Marie was the only lawyer he knew who knew he was an "innocent man."

In 1972, Cotroni's libel suit against Maclean's finally began. Ste. Marie was known for his dramatic courtroom style and he argued in the courtroom, "Maclean's seems to say: 'What! A man who does not know how to read or write, an immigrant, a nightclub owner daring to sue us!' He must be punished!" Ste. Marie in his defence of Cotroni's reputation stated that he had no criminal record after 1938 when he retired from professional wrestling, saying, "He is just a simple illiterate citizen who had problems with justice, who came out against it, against whom from 1938 to 1972, no criminal accusation was proven."

Typical of his style, Ste. Marie accused Maclean's of being too influenced by films such as The Godfather despite the fact that the article was published in 1963 while The Godfather was released in 1972. Continuing his argument against The Godfather, which he conflated with the Maclean's article, Ste. Marie stated: "Well, there was an old movie called King Kong, but that did not prove that gorillas were as tall as skyscrapers. And Bela Lugosi did not prove the existence of vampires, no more than the Quebec film, Deu Femmes en Or, proves that every suburban housewife sleeps with the plumber and the telephone repair man!"

The lawyer for Maclean's, A.J. Campbell, took the offensive, noting that Cotroni was in close contact with Joseph Bonanno, one of the most infamous gangsters of New York and a founding member of "the Commission." Ralph Salerno, the former head of the New York City Police Department's Intelligence Unit, testified as an expert witness for Maclean's, saying that in 1963 when the Maclean's article was published that, "Vic Cotroni was active in organized crime directly related to the Joe Bonanno organized crime group in New York." Salerno stated that since 1963 Cotroni's reputation in organized crime circles had stayed the same while Bonanno's reputation had greatly declined.

When confronted on the stand about frequent telephone calls to Bonanno, Cotroni became shifty and evasive as he claimed not to remember what the calls were about, though he insisted that it was all innocuous talk despite his professed inability to remember what was said. Campbell accused Cotroni of extorting money from the Montreal Ace Trucking Company, leading Cotroni to say that he had never heard of Ace Trucking. That lie proved to be a major mistake as Campbell produced invoices from Ace Trucking showing that the company had paid Cotroni $15,900 in 1960, $15,300 in 1961 and $15,900 in 1962 for his vague work as a "sales representative", leading Cotroni to claim that he had forgotten about these payments. The CEO of Ace Trucking, Sam Maislin, testified that Cotroni was a "sales representative to the Italian trade", which led Campbell to ask in response what expertise did an official "pepperoni salesman" have for the business of trucking. Maislin stated that Cotroni knew nothing about trucking and he only had hired him because he "knew the people."

Campbell also brought up the time when Cotroni tried to bribe a Montreal police officer with an offer of $50,000 in cash in exchange for not mentioning he was with his French Canadian mistress, Ghislaien Turgeon. Cotroni was at Turgeon's house having drinks with her, his brother Frank, and an American gangster, Joseph Asaro. Asaro was wanted in the United States on various charges, and when he was arrested at Turgeon's house, Cotroni did not want the officer to mention that he was at Turgeon's house with Asaro.

The officer testified at the trial that Cotroni had told him, "Money, that's not the question. Fix your price and you will be paid. My wife is in the hospital. She is very sick. If she learns of this arrest, at the home of my mistress, she could die. Everyone is going to say that Vic Vincent [Cotroni's wrestling ring name] is a stoolpigeon. My wife's going to know. The newspapers are going to talk about it and it will be a scandal."

Campbell also brought up Cotroni's meeting in Acapulco in 1970 with Lansky. Cotroni claimed in response not to know who Lansky was, saying he had never heard of him. Campbell then introduced photographs of Cotroni together with Lansky at the Acapulco summit.

Though Campbell failed to present evidence strong enough to persuade Justice St. Germain that Cotroni was a gangster, he did establish that Cotroni was at very least an unsavory character who was very far from the innocent portrayed by Ste. Marie. The judge concluded that Cotroni's reputation was "tainted" and only awarded him an insulting $2: $1 for the English version of Maclean's and another for the French version. Cotroni had promised to donate any money he won from Maclean's to charity, but there is no record of any charity ever receiving a $2 donation from Cotroni.

=== Decline ===
In the early 1970s, Cotroni transferred supervision of the day-to-day activities of the family to his Calabrian compatriot Paolo Violi, a capodecina, together with Nicolas Di Iorio, Frank Cotroni and Luigi Greco. Cotroni's role became more that of an adviser to the younger Calabrian. Greco led the Sicilian faction of the family until his death in 1972. Media reports usually described the Cotroni family as the "Cotroni–Violi family", which reflected the new balance of power.

A power struggle between the Calabrian and Sicilian factions of the family turned into a mob war in 1973. Violi complained about the independent modus operandi of his Sicilian "underlings", Nicolò Rizzuto in particular. "He is going from one side to the other, here and there, and he says nothing to nobody, he is doing business and nobody knows anything," Violi said about Rizzuto. Violi asked for more "soldiers" from his Bonanno bosses, clearly preparing for war. Cotroni remarked on 15 September 1972, "Me, I'm capodecina. I got the right to expel." Concerned about the possibility of a gang war in Montreal, two Bonanno family soldiers from New Jersey, Nicky Alfano and Nocola Buttofuoco, arrived in Montreal as mediators. The mediation mission failed, and police wiretaps record that both Cotroni and Violi talked often of "getting rid" of Rizzuto and have him "disappear." Another mission, this time led by Giuseppe Settecase of New York, was not successful and so the Bonanno family found themselves pondering Violi's request to kill Rizzuto.

Through the bugs planted by the Montreal police officer Robert Menard in Violi's Reggio Bar on Jean-Talon Street, the police recorded the members of the Settecase mission talk far too frankly about the affairs of the Bonanno family. Mario Latraverse, the chief of the Montreal police's anti-gang unit, recalled in a 1990 interview, "They came out with all the latest murders that occurred in New York City. They explained everything, everything. 'What happened to such and such?' 'Well, he died because'. Well, we called the New York authorities and they were flabbergasted...But they were here to mediate the request of Violi to kill Rizzuto. In that conversation, there was proof...that the Montreal family was a subfamiliy of the Bonanno family...And it was said then that money on a weekly basis was leaving Montreal...every Monday to go to New York." Much to the vexation of Cotroni and Violi, their bosses in the Bonanno family denied their requests to kill Rizzuto.

In 1974, Cotroni was subpoenaed to stand before the Quebec government's Commission d'enquête sur le crime organisé (CECO) inquiry into organized crime. He was sent to jail for one year on a contempt charge because his testimony, the Commission concluded, was "deliberately incomprehensible; rambling, vague, and nebulous." During his time on the stand, Cotroni kept making remarks such as "I have no authority" and "There were no meetings. These people are simply my friends." When the commission lawyer, Guy Dupre, who had grown tired of Cotroni's vague answers and professions of an inability to remember events, suggested he was "acting dumb", Cotroni's face lit up and he snapped in fury, "Do I look dumb?" His lawyer eventually won a reversal but only after Cotroni had spent several months behind bars.

Later that year, Cotroni and Violi were overheard on a police wiretap threatening to kill Hamilton mobster Johnny Papalia and demanding $150,000 after he used their names in a $300,000 extortion plot without notifying or cutting them in on the score. In a conversation secretly recorded by the police, Cotroni and Violi had a discussion in the Calabrian dialect before Papalia arrived in Montreal about how best to intimidate him. Violi was enraged at Papalia for having used the Cotroni family name, while Cotroni seemed more relaxed.

On 30 April 1974, Cotroni and Violi met with Papalia at the Reggio Bar owned by Violi. When Papalia denied taking the money from Toronto stockbroker Stanley Bader while using the name of the Cotroni family, Vic Cotroni quite casually told him, "Let's hope so because we'll kill you." Papalia responded with a humility and meekness that was unusual for him as he replied, "I know you'll kill me, Vic. I believe you'll kill me." Edwards wrote that Papalia had broken down in fear at the Reggio Bar meeting as he "whimpered" in the face of Cotroni, a man whom he was clearly terrified of. On 13 May 1974, at a meeting at the Reggio Foods factory, Cotroni and Violi talked in Calabrese, complaining that Papalia had failed to pay the money he had promised them. Cotroni had a low opinion of Papalia, whom he viewed as a coward, saying to Violi that the best way to deal with him was "...talk slowly, slowly...This is an easy fuck, you'll see."

Before his trial on the extortion charges relating to the Bader case began in the fall of 1976, Cotroni asked for the charges to be dismissed on account of ill health, saying he was suffering from diabetes, spinal arthritis, coronary thrombosis, urinary tract infection, hypertension, cardiac enlargement, myocardial inflection, angina, iritis in both eyes, swollen ankles and a polyp in his rectum. An Italian Mafia expert, Vincenzo Marci, wrote, "No prominent Mafia boss is without his sheaf of impressive-looking medical documents, confirming that he suffers from very serious illnesses—illnesses that prevent him from travelling to the place where he is supposed to be held in detention or coping with the rigors of imprisonment or attending a court hearing. In most cases, the illnesses are either non-existent or they are common ailments (such as arthritis, diabetes or liver disorders) which suddenly become severe...Several Mafia bosses have been suffering for years from incurable diseases, accordingly to their medical certificates: we must expect their imminent demise." The court dismissed Cotroni's lawyer's motion for dismissal as Justice Peter Wright ruled that Cotroni was healthy enough to stand trial.

During the trial, Papalia twice challenged Mario Latraverse, the chief of the Montreal police's anti-gang unit, to a fight in the men's bathroom of the courthouse, leading Latravese to take him up the challenges. The first incident ended when Tino Badelli, Cotroni's son-in-law, stepped in to prevent the fight and the second incident ended with Papalia backing down after Latraverse failed to break down in fear. When Cotroni heard about the bathroom incidents, he approached Latraverse and told him in French, "Monsieur Latraverse, I just found out what happened. I know you're a gentleman and he's not going to treat you like that." Latraverse reported that though it was clear that Papalia hated him, the incidents stopped after the meeting with Cotroni.

The three were convicted of extortion in 1975 and sentenced to six years in prison. Justice Peter Wright in convicting the three called the Crown's evidence "grim and appalling" and "about bad as it can be." Wright stated, "Nor do I detect any real hope for the rehabilitation of any you or any remorse. You are hardened and successful criminals. You have lived on the terror and fear and vices of others. You have used the weapons of threat and extortion in a section of society in which murder and violence are the servants of greed and power." Cotroni and Violi got their sentences reduced on appeal to just six months, but Papalia's was rejected. In 1977, Cotroni was confronted on the street by a television crew for the CBC documentary Connections about Mafia influence on the Canadian economy. Cotroni mistook the crew for rival gangsters who were about to castrate him, leading him to cover his groin with his hands as he attempted to flee.

Vito Rizzuto visited New York on behalf of his father to appear before "the Commission" to ask for permission to kill Violi, a request that was approved. However, "the Commission" did not grant their approval to kill Cotroni. On 22 January 1978, Violi was murdered under Rizzuto orders while Rizzuto was in Venezuela. Cotroni attended Violi's funeral, but declined to speak to Violi's widow or children. Edwards wrote about Cotroni's role in the Violi murder that he "...gave his grudging approval, knowing a refusal might add his name to the assassins' hit list. Vic Cotroni was not one to buck New York and any hit on Violi had to be sanctioned from the United States." Violi's brothers were also murdered. By the mid-1980s, the Rizzuto crime family emerged as Montreal's pre-eminent crime family after the turf war.

== Death ==
The Calabrian faction continued to operate with Frank Cotroni, who had been imprisoned from 1975 to 1979, as acting boss for his ill brother after the early 1980s. Vic Cotroni died of cancer at the age of 73, on 16 September 1984. Frank was left as boss. The procession from the Church of the Madonna della Difesa to Notre Dame des Neiges Cemetery was made up of some 45 vehicles, 23 of them laden with wreaths and floral tributes, a 17-piece brass band, and about 300 people, including members of his family and associates.

== Nickname ==
The origin of his nickname of "Vic the Egg" remains unknown. Eggs are a symbol of life and renewal in Calabrian culture and one theory holds that his nickname referred to his power to decide who lived and who died in the Montreal underworld. Another theory holds that the nickname was a reference to the roundish shape of his skull.

== Sources ==
- Auger, Michel; Edwards, Peter (2012). The Encyclopedia of Canadian Organized Crime: From Captain Kidd to Mom Boucher. Toronto: McClelland & Stewart. ISBN 978-0771030499.
- Cédilot, André; Noël, André (2012). Mafia Inc.: The Long, Bloody Reign of Canada's Sicilian Clan. Toronto: Vintage Canada. ISBN 978-0-307-36041-0.
- Edwards, Peter (1990). Blood Brothers: How Canada's Most Powerful Mafia Family Runs Its Business. Toronto: Key Porter Books. ISBN 1-55013-213-X.
- Humphreys, Adrian (2011). The Weasel: A Double Life in the Mob. Toronto: John Wiley & Sons. ISBN 978-0470964514.
- Langton, Jerry (2015). Cold War How Organized Crime Works in Canada and Why It's About to Get More Violent. Toronto: HarperColllins. ISBN 978-1-4434-3255-9.
