= Eddie Melo =

Portuguese-Canadian boxer and gangster

- Born: Eduardo Manuel de Melo; 31 July 1960; São Miguel, Azores, Portugal
- Died: 6 April 2001 (aged 40); Mississauga, Ontario, Canada
- Occupations: Professional boxer, gangster
- Allegiance: Cotroni crime family Siderno Group
- Boxing career
- Nickname: "Hurricane"
- Weight: Middleweight
- Stance: Orthodox

Boxing record
- Wins: 32
- Losses: 9
- Draws: 2

Eduardo Manuel de Melo (31 July 1960 – 6 April 2001), nicknamed "Eddie the Hurricane", was a Portuguese-born Canadian boxer and gangster.

== Boxer ==
Melo was born in São Miguel in the Azores archipelago, but grew up in Toronto, where his father worked in construction. Melo arrived in Canada on 5 October 1966. He recalled about his youth in a working-class neighborhood: "I was always fighting. If I had a black eye, I didn't put on dark glasses to hide it. If I got a little scratch and come home bleeding, my mother would go crazy. But the way I figured it, you can't give pain to somebody else and not expect to get a little bruised yourself". In 1971, his lifelong obsession with boxing started after he watched the famous Joe Frazier vs. Muhammad Ali fight of 8 March 1971 on his family's television.

Melo dropped out of high school in Grade 9 and with a forged birth certificate moved to Verdun, Quebec where he worked as a boxer. As an amateur boxer, Melo won 93 matches while losing only four. Melo made his debut as a professional boxer in Montreal on 7 March 1978 at the age of 17. Melo's boxing style gave him the nickname of "The Hurricane". Spider Jones said of Melo: "Eddie Melo filled the Montreal Forum at 18 years old. His explosive power punching style made him on one of Canada’s most exciting fighters of our time". Melo won his first 12 matches in a row in 1978 and 1979, with the majority being by knock-out. In 1979, Melo became the Canadian middleweight boxing champion. He rapidly became a favorite of boxing fans in Montreal. Over the course of his first 18 months as a professional boxer, Melo earned $150,000, making him the best paid boxer in Canada. The journalist James Kernaghan described the young Melo: "He was fast, a terrific puncher and he could take a punch. Growing into a light heavyweight (175 pounds) he was still mowing them down. Of any Canadian boxer of the past 50 years, the guy who looked like a young Anthony Quinn had world champion written all over him."

On 31 October 1978, Melo first fought Fernand Marcotte at the Verdun Auditorium in a match that lasted ten rounds and ended with him winning by split decision. In their second match, Marcotte won by majority decision. The final match in the famous rivalry ended in a draw. The fights between Melo and Marcotte were regarded as some of the best boxing matches in Montreal. In 1981, Melo finally became old enough to box in Ontario.

One of Melo's fans was the gangster Frank Cotroni of the Cotroni family of Montreal. Melo came to enjoy a friendship with Cotroni, whom he called "my number one fan". Kernaghan wrote that Melo appeared to have been depressed after losing a title match for the Canadian light heavyweight championship in Montreal on 11 March 1980 to Gary Summerhayes, which caused him to draw closer to Cotroni. In 1980, Melo was convicted of stabbing a bouncer with a pocket knife during a bar brawl, for which he served 90 days in prison. Melo was to be convicted 8 more times over the course of the rest of his life on charges of extortion or illegal weapons possession. In the early 1980s, Melo's boxing career went into decline with him losing a match by knock-out to the journeyman Ralph Hollett in Toronto in January 1981, an upset that badly damaged his career. Later in 1981, Melo was convicted of uttering death threats. The Cotroni-controlled Local 75 of the Hotel and Restaurant Employees Union fought with the United Food and Commercial Workers Union for the right to represent airport-strip workers at Toronto's Pearson International Airport. A bartender at the Pearson Airport bar complained to the police that Melo had pulled a loaded handgun to his head and asked him: "You don't want anything to happen to your baby or your wife, do you?" Melo denied the allegation to the police and then added that he never used a gun when threatening people as he clenched his fists and said: "I have my own weapons-these two".

On 4 May 1982, Melo had a much publicized match against Jimmie Gradson at the CNE Coliseum in Toronto that had been promoted by George Chuvalo. Prior to the match, both men had taken to insulting each other in public, and by all accounts the two boxers hated each other. The match was an extremely hard-fought one with judge Jackie Silver saying: "I’ve seen a lot of fights but never a war like this". The first three rounds of the Gradson–Melo match was described as leaving the audience breathless with excitement. Gradson finally won the match by knock-out in the tenth round. The last noteworthy fight by Melo was when he defeated via knock-out the former Canadian lightweight champion Gary Summerhayes in June 1983.

Melo had married a former Miss Montreal Alouette cheerleader. He used his boxing wealth to buy a Lincoln Continental automobile, a house in Toronto and some $20,000 worth of jewelry. It was felt that Melo suffered from poor management as his managers kept pushing for him "too hard, too fast" while he began to show signs of brain damage caused by his boxing. One of Melo's friends, the gangster, outlaw biker and fellow boxer Bernie "the Frog" Guindon thought it was wrong for Melo's managers to have him fight the top professional boxers while he was still a teenager, saying: "He was young and they didn't just care. They threw him in with the top fighters". Guindon felt that Melo who had won the middleweight Canadian boxing championship at the age of 19 would have benefitted if he been able to mature more as a boxer before being booked to fight the top boxers.

The hitman Réal Simard served as the Toronto representative of the Cotroni family starting in July 1983. Cotroni would visit Toronto about once every month to see Simard and during those visits Melo would serve as his chauffeur and bodyguard. A police check-up of Melo revealed that he was working as an organizer for Local 75 of the Hotel and Restaurant Employees' Union, a union so corrupt that it had been expelled in 1981 from the Fédération des travailleurs et travailleuses du Québec under the grounds that the union was controlled by Cotroni and it represented the interests of management instead of the workers. During one of his visits to Toronto, Cotroni went to the Little Italy neighborhood to meet with Rocco Zito, the leader of the Siderno Group of the 'Ndrangheta.

Starting in October 1984, a Royal Commission under Justice Raymond Bernier of the Quebec Sports Safety Board examined Mafia influence within boxing. Between October 1984 and July 1985, the Bernier Commission interviewed 105 people and in its report presented in March 1986 concluded that the boxing industry in Quebec was systemically corrupt and under the control of Cotroni, an avid boxing fan. Bernier wrote that Cotroni was the "guiding spirit" of boxing in Montreal and the boxing fights in Montreal were "probably rigged" to allow Cotroni to profit by betting against the boxers favored to win fights. The report listed Melo as one of the boxers who was associated with Cotroni. The Bernier commission report was so damning in its revelations of corruption in boxing that the report was censored by the Quebec government, and the full report has never been released to the public. It is believed that Melo's sudden career decline in the early 1980s after a promising start in the late 1970s was due less to a decline in his boxing abilities and more to him intentionally losing fights against inferior opponents to allow Cotroni to profit by betting against him. It was an open secret in the 1980s that Cotroni controlled boxing in Canada and that the Canadian boxing matches were rigged for his benefit, often in a clumsy and flagrant fashion as one policeman recalled: "Sometimes they missed a guy and he still fell down". The Ontario Provincial Police believed that Melo as a boxer was under the control of Cotroni. The police believed that the way that Melo lost fights in the 1980s against opponents whom he was widely expected to defeat were the result of match rigging with the popular rumor at the time being that Cotroni bribed boxers to lose by supplying them with free heroin, which could be either used and/or sold. With his career in decline, Melo retired in 1986. During his boxing career, Melo won 24 matches out of 34.

== Gangster ==
Melo at the time of his retirement went to work as an organizer for the Cotroni-controlled Hotel Employees and Restaurant Employees Union and then in the vending machine business. Melo was known for his aggressive style both in and outside of the ring, with many finding his temper to be quite ungovernable. Melo's real job was as the agent for the Cotroni family in Toronto, bringing in strippers and video game machines from Montreal to various Toronto bars. The previous Cotroni family representative for Toronto, the hitman Réal Simard, had turned Crown's evidence, thus requiring a replacement. Johnny Papalia, the boss of the Papalia family, came to detest Melo, once telling Cotroni: "Put a leash on Melo or I'll kill him". A policeman told a reporter from The Toronto Sun newspaper about Melo: "He was muscle but not a freelancer. He would look after Cotroni's problems."

In 1989, at a pool hall on College Street, Melo assaulted a Mafiosi after words had been exchanged, which led to a murder plot against him, with a hitman being hired to kill him. The hitman turned informer, and the police faked the murder of Melo with a photograph being taken of a crash test dummy designed to look like Melo being shot up and covered in fake blood. The hitman showed the photographs of the crash test dummy and was paid for the supposed murder, leading to those who had paid him being charged with conspiracy to commit murder. In April 1989, Melo's first marriage ended in divorce, with his ex-wife, Sine, moving to Vancouver with their two daughters. In 1990, the charges against Melo for conspiracy to commit extortion were dismissed in the famous Askov decision when a judge ruled that Melo's constitutional right to a speedy trial had been violated as the Crown had failed to start a trial against him 34 months after Melo was charged.

In 1991, a Mafiosi and the owner of Toronto's Casket Royale funeral home, Gaetano "Guy" Panepinto, had one of his business partners, Natale Roda, tried to assassinate the man behind the plot against Melo. Roda was carrying a bomb with the aim of avenging Melo, but the bomb exploded prematurely, costing him much of his arm. Panepinto was convicted of conspiracy to commit murder. It is believed that Panepinto had been hired by Cotroni. In 1991, the Papalia family underboss Carmen Barillaro told the police informer Marvin Elkind while he was wearing a wire that Melo was working for him as an enforcer. Elkind and Melo were close and the former arranged for the latter to have a high-paying unionized construction worker job where he never showed up for work. When the police issued a warrant for Melo's assault on charges of assault, Elkind told the police that Melo could be found attending the wedding of Frank Cotroni Jr. (the son of Frank Cotroni) in Montreal, and the police duly arrested Melo as he was leaving the wedding. Later in 1991, Melo was convicted of assault after he used his boxing skills to beat up a man during a brawl at a stag party, for which he served 90 days in prison.

In the early 1990s, Melo was often photographed eating in a Yorkville restaurant with a visiting Vancouver-area Hells Angel who worked as a loanshark. In 1993, a police report listed Melo as a member of the Siderno Group. The Hells Angel whom Melo met was Lloyd "Louie" Robinson, the half-brother of the Angels Vancouver East End chapter president, John Bryce (the two men have the same mother). The police believe that Bryce was just a frontman and that Robinson was the real president of the East End chapter. Melo served as the principle contact between the East End chapter of the Hells Angels with the Cotroni family of Montreal and the Commisso 'ndrina of Toronto, creating a cross-Canada alliance. Robinson often visited Toronto, and whenever he was in Toronto, he met Melo at Yorkville restaurants such as Remy's and the Pilot. Melo and Robinson were often photographed by RCMP surveillance teams talking with the three Commisso brothers, namely Rocco Remo, Cosimo and Michele. Likewise, Melo would frequently visit Vancouver and during his visits to the West Coast, he was always a guest of honor at the Angels' East End chapter clubhouse. One of Robinson's interests was in having French-Canadian strippers from Quebec work in strip-clubs in the Lower Mainland. Robinsons' company, That's Entertainment Inc, was one of the three largest strippers' agencies in the Lower Mainland. That's Entertainment was owned by 399413 Alberta Ltd, whose reports in 1993 and 1994 listed Ken Lelek and Robinson as the two directors. Likewise, Robinson was a pioneer in Internet pornography as the company, Starnet Computer Communications, which was owned by That's Entertainment, had the world's first live-feed Internet strip show in May 1995, and was the first internet company to have its own secure credit card interface.

Melo was notably enraged when long-time Papalia family associate Marvin Elkind was exposed as a police informer in 1993. Melo tried to use his boxing skills to beat up Elkind outside of the St. Lawrence Market in Toronto. Elknd was saved when Mitchell Chuvalo, the son of the boxer George Chuvalo came to his aid. In early 1994, Melo decided to resume his boxing career, hiring the Israeli-Canadian businessman Harold Arviv as his manager. Arviv was a flamboyant character, well known in Toronto, who had gone to prison for four years starting in 1986 for hiring via the Commisso 'ndrina the Satan's Choice hitman and bomber Cecil Kirby to blow up his disco in 1980 in order to allow him to collect the insurance money. Arviv was given to flaunting his wealth as he owned a luxury yacht, The Problem Child, that was worth $170,000 that he used to sail Lake Ontario with; previous yachts owned by Arviv had been named Monkey Business and Misbehavior, a choice of names that said much about his personality. In March 1994, Melo and Arviv called a press conference where they talked grandly about plans for Melo to perform a comeback tour of Europe, a tour that never occurred. In August 1994, Melo was recorded by a police wiretap talking to a Cotroni family member, Tony Volpato, where he said: "I went there when they had the meeting. I had a couple of guys. We took care of things. You know what I mean?...Went down and took care of things, so there is no problem...So what I'm doing, I think, is the right thing for us and fuck the other guy".

Before Melo could resume boxing, later in 1994 it was discovered that he had never taken Canadian citizenship, thus leading for the government to order him deported to Portugal. Melo fought against the deportation order, arguing: "My parents brought me here for a better life. I did everything in Canada. Had two daughters and now a baby. And I have to add I got in a lot of trouble here, too". In an immigration hearing, Melo admitted that one of his close friends was Joe Diardo, a "leg and arm man" who had thirty convictions going back to 1958 for arson, for passing counterfeit money, robbery, and possession of illegal guns. Melo described Cotroni as one of his best friends and admitted that Volpato was the godfather to one his daughters. Melo also admitted to being a godfather to one of Arviv's daughters. Melo was asked why he should be allowed to stay in Canada given his association with known criminals such as Cotroni, Arviv, and Volpato, leading for him to reply: "All I know is that they've been OK with me. They've never asked me to do any criminal activity or get into trouble. They've only been supportive in whatever it was that I had to do". Melo's friendship with Arviv ended in a bitter dispute over money.

Melo remained a celebrity in Toronto, attending the 1998 Toronto International Film Festival, where he posted for photographs with his second wife, Rhonda, whom it was noted resembled Pamela Lee Anderson. At the same time, Melo claimed to be taking drugs to control his anger, saying he was trying to reform. However, the police remained suspicious of Melo, noting he was still working in the all-cash vending machine business, through Melo complained that police surveillance made it difficult for him to work in the vending machine business. The police also noted that Melo listed his annual income when filing taxes as being about $24,000 yet he lived in a condo on Lakeshore Boulevard West that cost $2,000 per month; paid $1,500 in child support to his ex-wife every month; owned another condo on Queen's Quay; and owned two vehicles, a Jaguar automobile and a sports utility car.

Melo served as a mentor to a fellow Portuguese-Canadian gangster Johnny Raposo. Raposo was so close to Melo that he was known as his "clone" or as "little Eddie" as Raposo took to dressing, speaking and having the same mannerisms as Melo. Melo was considered to be a "legend" in the "Little Portugal" neighborhood on College Street and Raposo idolized him. Raposo followed Melo's advice as he accepted Melo's aphorisms such as "a jealous man is a dangerous man", "the phone is just for ordering pizza", and "a hungry man is a dangerous man", as advice to live by. Melo also advised Raposo to never answer the door on Halloween, saying that Halloween was a dangerous holiday for gangsters as it was dark in on 31 October and that there were too many people wearing masks on All Hallows Eve, making it all too easy for a hitman to don a mask and strike on Halloween. Melo came to prefer mortgage fraud and stock market fraud in his last years while his protégé Raposo became one of the biggest cocaine dealers in Toronto, buying from the Sinaloa Cartel of Mexico.

== Murder ==
On Friday 6 April 2001, Melo planned to go out with his on and off again girlfriend to attend a concert by Andrea Bocelli at the Air Canada Centre. At about 5:15 pm, Melo went to Amici Sport Café in Mississauga to meet his friend João "Johnny" Pavão. At about 6:25 pm, Melo was in the parking lot talking to Pavão when the hitman Charles Gagné shot Melo in the head and then killed Pavão as an inconvenient witness. On 8 April 2001, Rhonda, his daughter Jessica and his brother Tony along with Rhonda's brother were all charged with obstruction of justice and assault after they attacked the officers of the Peel Regional Police who tried to seize Melo's Jaguar for evidence.

Melo's daughter, Jessica, who was studying criminology at Simon Fraser University at the time of his murder told the media: "He was the most amazing father, friend, confidante, supporter, everything. I couldn't have asked for a better person to be my father...I was with him for nineteen years. I went everywhere with him".

Gagné was promised to be paid $75,000 for killing Melo. I his testimony during the DaSilva trial, Gagné claims to not have been paid the amount promised to him. Gagné was a career criminal from Montreal who was on parole for armed robbery when he took the contract on Melo's life. On 30 September 2003, Gagné pledged guilty to second-degree murder after striking up a "sweetheart deal" and a promise of financial security by the Crown Attorney Steve Sheriff and the Crowns star witness Fernando Ribeiro. Gagné was sentenced to life in prison, being eligible for parole after 12 years in exchange for testifying against his employer. A deal that the Crown and his witness Ribeiro contrived. The Melo family had been forewarned by the detectives NOT to trust Ribeiro. Gagné received funds in his canteen from Ribeiro along with his wife Maria. In total Gagné has received $80,000.00. In 2016 Gagné married and Ribeiro also provided the wedding rings and an envelope containing an undisclosed amount of money. The police believe that Melo's murder was linked to a "historical conflict within the 'Ndrangheta (in Ontario) and that the organization has had with other Italian criminalized groups (in Canada)." In 2005, a Toronto businessman, Manuel Dasilva, went on trial with the Crown alleging that he hired Gagné to kill Melo. The trial ended with Dasilva acquitted. Gagné has often applied for parole, but the fact he committed two murders while on parole for armed robbery has made his applications controversial. Melo's daughter along with other family members are vehemently opposed to his release on parole, arguing that the fact he killed while on parole in 2001 makes him undeserving of freedom again. On 18 February 2022, Gagné was denied full parole, but was granted limited release.

== Books ==
- Auger, Michel; Edwards, Peter (2004). The Encyclopedia of Canadian Organized Crime: From Captain Kidd to Mom Boucher. Toronto: McClelland & Stewart. ISBN 0771030495.
- Cédilot, André; Noël, André (2012). Mafia Inc.: The Long, Bloody Reign of Canada's Sicilian Clan. Toronto: Vintage Canada. ISBN 9780307360410.
- Edwards, Peter (1990). Blood Brothers: How Canada's Most Powerful Mafia Family Runs Its Business. Toronto: Key Porter Books. ISBN 155013213X.
- Edwards, Peter (2017). Hard Road: Bernie Guindon and the Reign of the Satan's Choice Motorcycle Club. Toronto: Random House. ISBN 978-0345816108.
- Edwards, Peter; Nájera, Luis (2021). The Wolfpack The Millennial Mobsters Who Brought Chaos and the Cartels to the Canadian Underworl. Toronto: Random House of Canada. ISBN 9780735275409.
- Humphreys, Adrian (2011). The Weasel: A Double Life in the Mob. Toronto: John Wiley & Sons. ISBN 0470964510.
- Schneider, Stephen (2009). Iced The Story of Organized Crime in Canada. Toronto: John Wiley & Sons. ISBN 9780470835005.
- Sher, Julian; Marsden, William (2003). The Road To Hell How the Biker Gangs Are Conquering Canada. Toronto: Alfred Knopf. ISBN 0-676-97598-4.
