= Cotroni crime family =

Italian-Canadian crime family

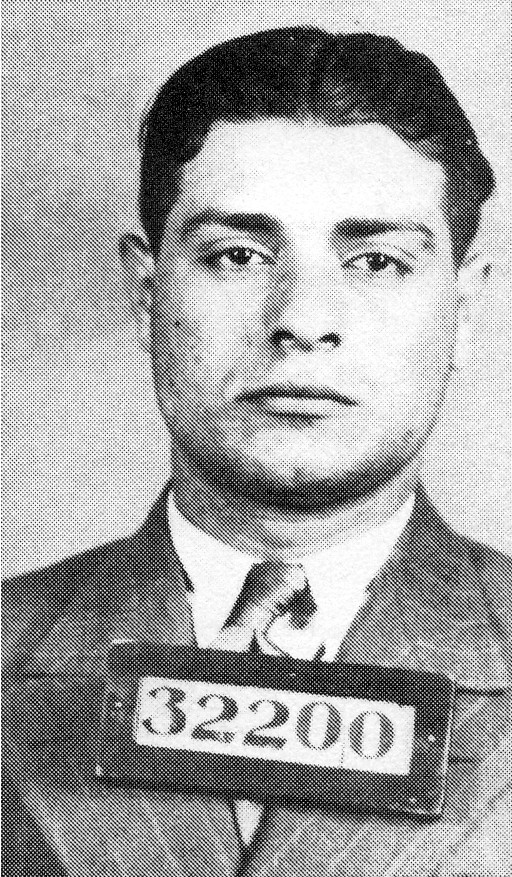
- Family founder Vincenzo Cotroni
- Founded: c. 1940s
- Founder: Vincenzo Cotroni
- Founding location: Montreal, Quebec, Canada
- Years active: c. 1940s–2000s
- Territory: Primarily Greater Montreal, with additional territory throughout Quebec and Southern Ontario, as well as South Florida
- Ethnicity: Italians as "made men" and other ethnicities as associates
- Activities: Racketeering, drug trafficking, murder, illegal gambling, corruption, extortion, theft, loan sharking, fraud
- Allies: Bonanno crime family; Commisso 'ndrina; Hells Angels MC; West End Gang
- Rivals: Blass gang; Dubois gang; Rizzuto crime family; Rock Machine MC

The Cotroni crime family, originally Cotrone (Italian: [koˈtroːne]), was an Italian Canadian crime family based in Montreal, Quebec. The United States Federal Bureau of Investigation (FBI) considered the family a branch of the Bonanno crime family of New York City.

The organization was established in the 1940s by Vincenzo Cotroni, a Calabrian immigrant from Mammola. Its territory once covered most of southern Quebec and Ontario. An internal war broke out between the Calabrian and Sicilian factions of the family in the late 1970s, which resulted in the death of acting caporegime (captain) Paolo Violi and his brothers. This allowed the Sicilian Rizzuto faction to overtake the Cotroni's Calabrian faction as the preeminent crime family in Montreal. Vincenzo died of cancer in 1984, followed by his brother Frank in 2004.

== History ==
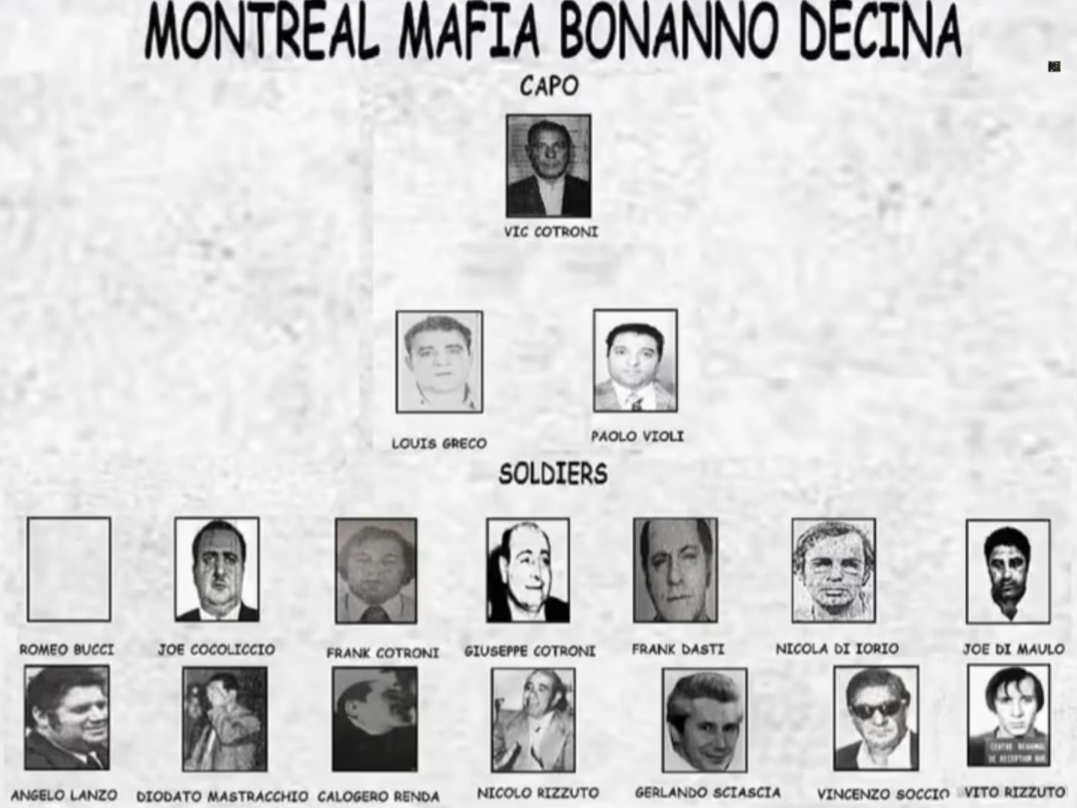
Royal Canadian Mounted Police chart of the Bonanno crime family's crew (decina) in Montreal

In 1924, Vincenzo Cotroni immigrated to Montreal, Quebec, with his two sisters, Marguerita and Palmina, and his brother Giuseppe; his two other brothers, Frank and Michel, were later born in Montreal. In the late 1920s, Cotroni attended a professional wrestling school where his teacher, the French-Canadian wrestler Armand Courville, ended up joining the family. Cotroni and Courville became infamous in Montreal for their roles in the "baseball bat elections" of the 1930s, working as enforcers for the Quebec Liberal Party and using baseball bats to threaten or assault voters opposed to the Liberals. When the Union Nationale won the 1936 election, Cotroni and Courville switched their loyalties. The two men forged political connections that ensured immunity from prosecution for decades afterwards.

In the 1950s, the Cotroni family formed a strong connection to the New York City-based Bonanno crime family, which was beginning to take control of the majority of Montreal's drug trade. In 1953, Carmine "Lilo" Galante, an influential member of the Bonanno family, arrived in Montreal and worked with Cotroni. Galante planned to make Montreal a pivotal location in the importation of heroin from overseas for distribution in New York and across the United States via the French Connection. Police also estimated that Galante was collecting gambling profits in Montreal worth about $50 million per year. In April 1956, due to Galante's strong-arm extortion tactics, the Canadian government deported him back to the U.S.

As is the norm with Mafia families, the elite status of "made men" was limited to those who were Italian or of Italian descent, with the status of associate open to those of non-Italian background. The vast majority of the Cotroni family's "made men" originated from the Mezzogiorno (the south of Italy), but unusually there was no rules against members from different regions, such as Calabrians and Sicilians. In 1975, Dr. Alberto Sabatino of the Italian Polizia di Stato testified as an expert witness at the Commission d'Enquête sur le Crime Organisé (CECO) that the Cotroni family was "exceptional" in having Sicilians and Calabrians working together. Sabationo testified: "Such a mixture of Calabrian and Sicilian gangsters does not occur in Italy."

At the height of their power in the 1960s and 1970s, the Cotroni family was divided along geographical lines, with each caporegime (captain) running a particular district of Montreal. Lugi Greco, a Sicilian, ran the family's operations in the west end of Montreal; Cotroni's brother Frank ran the family's operations in the Saint-Laurent district; Canadian-born Nicola Di Iorio ran the Sorrento Gang; and the Calabrian Paolo Violi served as Cotroni's deputy. The two most important non-Italian members of the family were Courville and William Obront, the "Canadian Meyer Lanksy", who performed a role similar to a chief financial officer for the family, in charge of money laundering and stock fraud.

In the late 1960s, the Cotronis engaged in a violent feud with French-Canadian mobster Richard Blass, with Cotroni associate Joe Di Maulo doing much of the enforcing. On 7 May 1968, Blass and Robert Allard attempted an ambush of Frank Cotroni outside his home; two of his bodyguards were killed, but Frank escaped. The Montreal underworld was violent, with 110 gangland murders between 1963 and 1969; 70 murders occurred in 1968 and 1969. A provincial commission in 1969 blamed the murders on a struggle for control between the Bonanno family in New York and the Magaddino family in Buffalo, but in reality much of the violence was caused by Blass' upstart French-Canadian gang challenging the dominance of the Cotroni family. On 4 May 1968, two of Blass' men, Gilles Bienvenue and Albert Ouimet, were murdered, and on 7 May 1968, Blass associate Roger Larue was also killed. In October 1968, Di Maulo twice shot Blass, who survived his wounds.

Both Di Iorio and his deputy, Frank D'Asti, were very close to the Quebec Liberal Party. In 1969, when Pierre Laporte unsuccessfully ran for the leadership of the Liberals, both Di Iorio and D'Asti donated heavily to the Laporte campaign. Laporte's two principle aides, René Gagnon and Jean-Jacques Coté, met with Di Iorio and D'Asti to pick up briefcases full of cash during his 1969 leadership bid and again in the 1970 provincial election, which was won by the Liberals. After Bourassa became premier, Di Iorio and D'Asti were recorded by police bugs in expressing the hope that Laporte would become the province's Minister of Justice and were disappointed when he failed to secure that portfolio. However, the fact that Robert Bourassa appointed Laporte Minister of Labour was considered to be a consolation prize by the two men, and Coté promised them that the new Minister of Justice, Jérôme Choquette, would be friendly towards the Cotroni family.

During the October Crisis of 1970, Vincenzo Cotroni was often mentioned in the manifestos of the Front de libération du Québec (FLQ), which accused the gangster of rigging elections on behalf of the Liberals and being one of the exploiters of the French-Canadian working class. Cotroni did not welcome the attention that the FLQ manifestos, which were read on both the television and radio, brought to him. After Laporte was kidnapped by the FLQ, D'Asti approached his aide, René Gagnon, offering to have the Cotroni family help police find the labour minister before the FLQ killed him. Although the offer was accepted, Laporte was not rescued and his body was found stuffed into the trunk of an automobile. In December 1970, policeman Robert Ménard successfully bugged the Reggio Bar, Violi's base of operations. The recordings of an oblivious Violi revealed much about the operations of the Mafia in not only Canada, but also the U.S. and Italy as well.

In the 1960s and 1970s, Cotroni used Obront to supervise a bookmaking network in the Ottawa-Hull area that handled around $50,000 in bets per day, with 25 percent going to Violi. Obront also served as Cotroni's chief banker and financial adviser, responsible for laundering money. For Montreal's Expo 67, Obront also helped the Cotroni family land the meat and vending machine supply contract — most of which was tainted meat. In 1973, Obront was charged with tax fraud, sentenced to twenty months in jail and ordered to pay $683,046 in back taxes.

In September 1974, Cotroni was subpoenaed to testify at the Commission d'Enquête sur le Crime Organisé and was imprisoned for contempt after the commissioners declared his testimony to be "voluntarily incomprehensible, disconnected, vague, hazy and equivalent to a refusal to testify". Following Cotroni's imprisonment, Violi took over control of the family, and on 9 January 1975, Violi told Pietro Sciarra to go to New York to ask Philip "Rusty" Rastelli of the Bonanno family to appoint him the new boss of the Cotroni family.

=== Mafia war in Montreal ===
Following his imprisonment, Cotroni transferred the day-to-day activities of the family to Violi, together with Frank, Di Iorio and Greco. Cotroni's role became more that of an adviser to Violi. Greco led the Sicilian faction of the family until his death in 1972.

Soon after, in 1973, a violent power struggle broke out between Sicilian and Calabrian factions of the family, notably aspiring Sicilian boss Nicolò Rizzuto. In 1976, the recordings made by Ménard over the previous six years were played in public at Commission d'enquête sur le crime organisé, which destroyed Violi's reputation within the mob. Journalists André Cedilot and André Noel wrote: "The Mafia would never forgive him [Violi] for being so stupidly careless as to let a cop bug his place of business". The Bonnano family, to whom the Cotroni family answered to, shifted their support from Violi to Rizzuto, whom they felt to be a more competent criminal.

During the war in Montreal, Violi and his brothers were murdered along with others from the mid 1970s to the early 1980s, when the war ceased. Peter Edwards, the crime correspondent of the Toronto Star, wrote: "Vic Cotroni was not one to buck New York and any hit on Violi had to be sanctioned from the United States". By the mid 1980s, the Rizzuto crime family emerged as Montreal's pre-eminent crime family after the turf war.

=== Frank Cotroni era and downfall ===
The Calabrian faction continued to operate with Frank Cotroni, who had been imprisoned from 1975 to 1979, as acting boss for his ill brother after the early 1980s. On 16 September 1984, Vincenzo Cotroni died of cancer, and Frank was left as boss. Frank developed connections with French-Canadian Réal Simard, who became his driver and hitman. In 1986, Simard turned informant after his arrest, confessing to five murders and involvement with the Cotronis. Frank was sentenced to eight years in prison for manslaughter in 1987.

After Simard turned Crown's evidence following his arrest in Toronto, his replacement was the boxer Eddie Melo. Like Simard, Melo was in charge of bringing strippers and video game machines from Montreal to the Toronto area. In the early 1990s, Melo took the lead in forging a cross-Canada alliance with the Commisso 'ndrina of Toronto and the East End Vancouver chapter of the Hells Angels. Police surveillance teams observed Melo frequently having meetings in Toronto with the three Commisso brothers and Lloyd "Louie" Robinson, the sergeant-at-arms of the Hells Angels East End chapter. Melo also often visited Vancouver, where he was greeted with much respect during his visits to the clubhouse of the East End chapter.

Frank Cotroni and his son Francesco "Frank" Cotroni Jr. were among 30 people arrested on 18 April 1996 as part of Operation Caviar, a three-year RCMP investigation into an international drug network involving the Mafia and the West End Gang. On 4 April 1997, Frank Cotroni was sentenced to seven years in prison after he and his son pleaded guilty to plotting to import 180 kilograms of cocaine from Colombia.

On 23 August 1998, Paolo "Paul" Cotroni, another son of Frank Cotroni, was shot and killed in the driveway of his home in Repentigny by two hitmen, Gérald Gallant and Gérard Hubert, under contract from the Rock Machine biker gang, due to his association with the Hells Angels during the Quebec Biker War.

On 17 August 2004, Frank Cotroni died of brain cancer, leaving the Rizzuto Sicilian faction as the most powerful crime family in Canada.

On 4 November 2012, Joe Di Maulo, a longtime ally of the Cotroni family, was murdered outside his Montreal home. Police believe his murder is part of an ongoing power struggle between the Sicilians and their rivals.

== Books ==
- Auger, Michel; Edwards, Peter (2004). The Encyclopedia of Canadian Organized Crime: From Captain Kidd to Mom Boucher. Toronto: McClelland & Stewart. ISBN 0771030495.
- Cedilot, Andre; Noel, Andre (2012). Mafia Inc. The Long, Bloody Reign of Canada's Sicilian Clan. Toronto: Random House of Canada. ISBN 9780307360410.
- Edwards, Peter (1990). Blood Brothers: How Canada's Most Powerful Mafia Family Runs Its Business. Toronto: Key Porter Books. ISBN 155013213X.
- Langton, Jerry (2015). Cold War How Organized Crime Works in Canada and Why It's About to Get More Violent. Toronto: HarperColllins. ISBN 978-1-4434-3255-9.
- Lamothe, Lee and Adrian Humphreys (2008). The Sixth Family: The Collapse of the New York Mafia and the Rise of Vito Rizzuto, Toronto: John Wiley & Sons Canada Ltd., ISBN 0-470-15445-4 (revised edition)
- Schneider, Stephen (2009). Iced: The Story of Organized Crime in Canada. Toronto: John Wiley & Sons. ISBN 978-0470835005.
- Sher, Julian; Marsden, William (2003). The Road To Hell How the Biker Gangs Are Conquering Canada. Toronto: Alfred Knopf. ISBN 0-676-97598-4.

Mentioned in Wise Guys as one of the names of bosses in the same prison as Henry Hill.
