= Frank Cotroni =

Canadian mobster (1931–2004)

- Born: Francesco Cotrone; 1931; Montreal, Quebec, Canada
- Died: 17 August 2004 (aged 72); Montreal, Quebec, Canada
- Other name: Le Gros ("the Big Guy")
- Occupation: Crime boss
- Spouse: Pauline Desormiers
- Children: Francesco Cotroni Jr. Paolo Cotroni
- Parent: Nicodemo Cotroni
- Relatives: Vincenzo Cotroni (brother)
- Allegiance: Bonanno crime family Cotroni crime family
- Convictions: Drug smuggling (1975); Manslaughter (1987); Drug trafficking (1997)
- Penalty: 15 years' imprisonment; served four years Eight years' imprisonment Seven years' imprisonment; served four years

Frank Cotroni (born Francesco Cotrone; Italian: [franˈtʃesko koˈtroːne]; 1931 – 17 August 2004) was an Italian-Canadian crime boss of the Cotroni crime family in Montreal, Quebec.

Cotroni was born in 1931, in Montreal. His family, including his brother Vincenzo, had immigrated to Montreal in 1924, from Mammola, Calabria, Italy. His brother founded and headed the Cotroni crime family. Cotroni's principle illicit businesses were drug trafficking and labor racketeering, while he also worked at various times as a restaurateur, boxing promoter, owner of strip clubs in both Montreal and Toronto, ceramic manufacturer, and owner of a vending machine company. Cotroni had connections with the Bonanno crime family, and in 1975, was convicted in the United States of smuggling cocaine and sentenced to 15 years in prison. In prison, Cotroni met fellow inmate French-Canadian Réal Simard, and Simard would become Frank's driver and eventual hitman upon their release in 1979.

During the violent Mafia war with the Sicilian Rizzuto crime family in Montreal, Paolo Violi (who was acting capo for Vic Cotroni) and his brothers were murdered along with others through the mid-1970s to the early 1980s until the war ceased. The Calabrian faction continued to operate with Frank as acting boss for his ill brother after the early 1980s. In the early 1980s, Cotroni ordered Simard to commit several murders. In 1983, Simard and associate Richard Clément killed Mario Héroux, but unknowingly only severely wounded Robert Hétu, in their Toronto hotel room after they conspired to kill Clément. Hétu testified against Simard and Simard was arrested and convicted, until he became an informant against Frank Cotroni and the family; this resulted in an eight-year sentence for manslaughter against Frank, his son Francesco, and two associates in 1987. In 1989, Cotroni lost his court fight against extradition on narcotics charges in Connecticut that dated back to 1983, on the condition that he serve his time in Canada. In 1997, he was again imprisoned on narcotics violations, and released from prison in 2002 after serving four years of a seven-year sentence. In the final two years of Frank's life, he released a cookbook, Cuisine des souvenirs et recettes (Kitchen of Memories and Recipes), published by a subsidiary of Quebecor Media. Cotroni died of brain cancer on 17 August 2004.

== Early life ==
Cotroni was born in Montreal in 1931. His oldest brother, Vincenzo, was 20 years older, born in 1911 in Mammola, Calabria, Italy, and immigrated to Montreal in 1924 with his two sisters, Marguerita and Palmina, and his brother Giuseppe; his other brother, Michel, was later born in Montreal like Frank. Within Montreal, Cotroni was known to French-Canadians as Le Gros ("the Big Guy") and to Italo-Canadians as Il Cice (an Italian phrase for the soft center of a hard nut). Cotroni was fluently trilingual, speaking Italian, French and English. Unlike his older brother Vic who always spoke his French with a strong Italian accent, Frank spoke joual (Quebec French) like a native speaker. Cotroni was described as being more comfortable speaking French than Italian. Likewise, Frank married into a French-Canadian family and regarded himself as a Quebecois.

Cotroni grew up in a house at the junction of Ontario and St. Timotheé streets in Le Plateau-Mont-Royal (now in Montreal), a poor neighbourhood that more affluent Italian immigrants avoided because of its high crime rate. His father, Nicodemo, was a carpenter whose average weekly income was $35. His older brother, Vincenzo, had become involved in organized crime in the late 1920s, and in the 1930s was involved in "baseball bat elections" where he served as "muscle" for the Quebec Liberal Party and the Union Nationale, beating up supporters of rival parties and stuffing ballot boxes. As a result of Vincenzo's work in "baseball bat elections", the Cotroni family enjoyed the protection of Quebec politicians for decades afterward. Between 1953 and 1957, New York mobster Carmine Galante lived in Montreal, and during his time in Canada, Galante forged an alliance between the Bonanno family of New York and the Cotroni family of Montreal that cemented the Cotroni family as the dominant organized crime group in Montreal.

== Criminal career ==
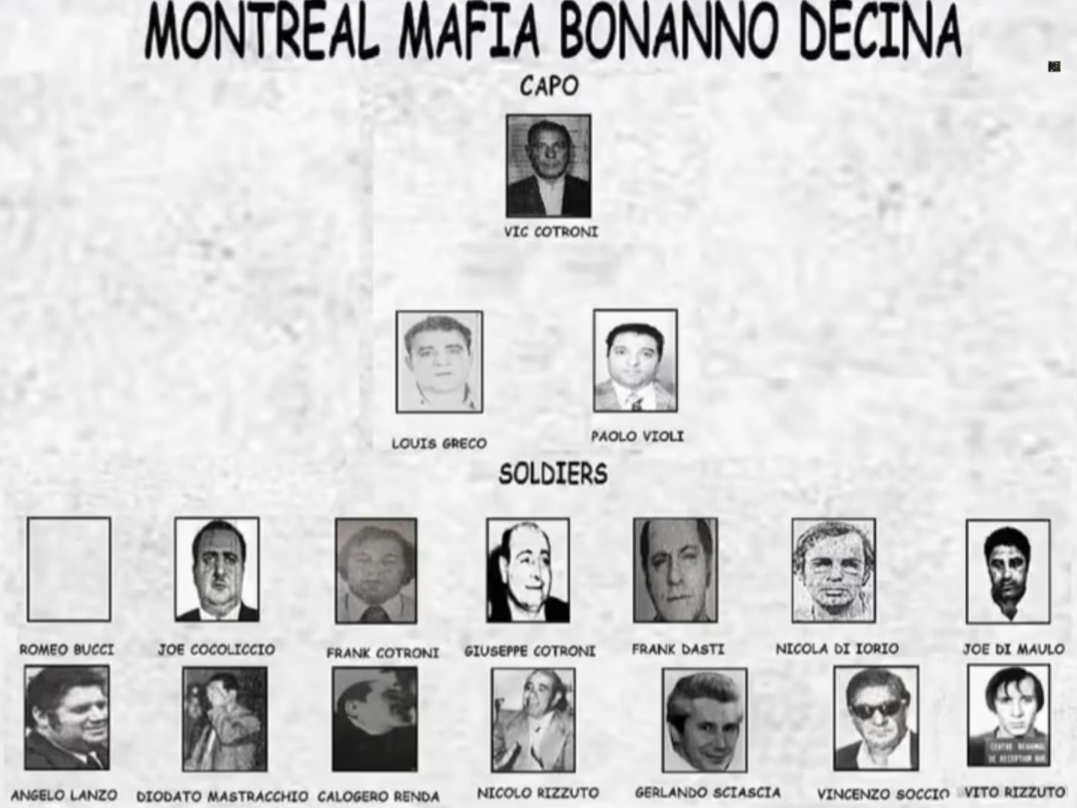
RCMP chart of the Bonanno crime family's crew (decina) in Montreal

In 1950, Cotroni was convicted of the possession of stolen goods, serving a short sentence on the account of his age. On 24 July 1956, he was arrested for taking part in a wild street brawl that left several men injured. Cotroni was first arrested as an adult in September 1960 for the possession of a deadly weapon, being found carrying a handgun. While on bail, in November 1960, Cotroni led 30 of his men into smashing up the Chez Parée Cabaret, for which he was fined $200. On 4 November 1960, Cotroni and his men marched into the Chez Parée and smashed everything with baseball bats that caused $30,000 in damages. Cotroni was heard to shout in French, "They will pay me, even if I have to wait until I die". Cotroni and his men were arrested leaving the Chez Parée. A group of students from McGill University were being held in the Montreal jail following allegations of drunken behavior and throwing a beer bottle at a police officer. Cotroni and his men were placed into the same jail cell and the students were impressed with Cotroni's kindness as he gave his expensive fur coat to a student who had no coat. The students were later shocked to learn that the same man who behaved in a kindly fashion to them was the same man who destroyed the Chez Parée earlier that night.

On 1 July 1966, he rented a house at 5146 Trans-Island Street, which was directly opposite a branch of the Decarie Boulevard City and District Savings Bank. A group of men consisting of Paul Désormier Sr.; his three sons, Michel, Paul Jr. and Pierre; and Joe Horvath of the West End Gang started to dig a tunnel from the basement of the house that Cotroni rented to the vault of the bank across the street. On 31 March 1967, the five men were arrested in their makeshift tunnel as they were preparing to break into the bank vault. Shortly afterward, Cotroni was charged with conspiracy to commit robbery under the grounds that he must had known that a tunnel was being dug from the house he rented to the vault of the Decarie Boulevard City and District Savings Bank. However, Cotroni's associates refused plea bargains offered by the Crown for lesser sentences in exchange for naming him as the mastermind behind the robbery attempt, leading to Cotroni's acquittal at his trial in 1971.

In the late 1960s, the Cotronis had violent feuds with French-Canadian mobster Richard Blass, with Cotroni associate Joe Di Maulo doing much of the enforcing. On 7 May 1968, Blass and Robert Allard attempted an ambush of Frank outside his home; two of his bodyguards were killed, but Frank escaped.

Cotroni's principle illicit businesses were drug trafficking and labour racketeering, while he also worked at various times as a restaurateur; boxing promoter; owner of strip clubs in both Montreal and Toronto; ceramic manufacturer; and the owner of a vending machine company. Cotroni had links with known drug traffickers in New York, Cali, Lima, and Miami. Cotroni also imported hashish from Lebanon, and was so well connected in that country that in 1975 the police discovered that he had called President Suleiman Frangieh several times. In 1969 and 1970, Cotroni was seen by the police talking several times with Tommaso Buscetta of the Sicilian Mafia, which was believed to marked the beginning of his career smuggling heroin. Besides smuggling heroin, Cotroni was also involved in human trafficking, smuggling in illegal immigrants from the Mezzogiorno (the south of Italy). The illegal immigrants consisted of two classes of people. The first group were criminals unable to enter Canada because of their records, who were brought over to continue their gangster activities. The second group were brought over as ultra-cheap menial labor to work in such occupations such as construction workers, garbagemen or dishwashers in restaurants. The ultimate destination for both groups tended to be the United States with Canada just a stopping point along their journey.

In 1970, Cotroni along with his brother Vic attended a crime summit in Acapulco to meet with gangsters from Canada, the United States, France, and Mexico to discuss plans to take over the soon-to-be-legalized casino industry in Quebec. The chairman of the Acapulco summit was Meyer Lansky who represented "the Commission" of New York. The plans turned out to be moot when Robert Bourassa reverted on legalization of casinos in response to the October crisis of 1970. The Front de libération du Québec (FLQ) in its manifesto of 8 October 1970 that was read out on national television and radio following the kidnapping of the British trade commissioner James Cross accused Bourassa of being the puppet of "the election riggers Simard–Cotroni", which was clearly a reference to the support offered by the Cotroni family to the Parti libéral du Quebec.

On 18 February 1971, with his lawyer Sidney Leithman at his side, Cotroni called a press conference to discuss his arrest in Mexico the previous month. This was the first press conference in Canada ever called by a Mafia leader, which reflected Cotroni's personality, as he was more "audacious" and less bound by the traditional rules of the Mafia as Cotroni enjoyed media attention in a way that his brothers did not. Cotroni made a point of stressing that his arrest in Acapulco for the possession of stolen jewelry was a case of mistaken identity. Cotroni did not mention that he was in Mexico to discuss setting up a pipeline for smuggling heroin into the United States and Canada. The scholar Steven Schneider noted that Cotroni's "reckless abandon" led to him being arrested more times than his brothers Vic and Pep had been combined.

In 1972, Cotroni was charged with extortion. A Greek immigrant, Dionysus Chionis, testified that three men had entered his restaurant and told him he would have to pay $250 per week to Cotroni because otherwise, "...they would break everything and demolish the restaurant...They said they were killers and if I didn't pay they would cut off my head with a knife". After making three payments, Chionis was told he had to sign over half of his restaurant to Cotroni in exchange for being allowed to continue to live. On the second day of the trial, Chionis, who was notably nervous on the stand retracted his previous day's testimony as he maintained he could not remember if he was the victim of extortion or not. The judge dismissed the charges and congratulated Cotroni on "two victories on the same day". At the same time, Cotroni came into conflict with the Dubois brothers. After Cotroni's brother-in-law, Richard Desormiers, had threatened to kill a Dubois gang member inside a Dubois-owned nightclub, Claude Dubois contacted Cotroni to tell him that Desormiers had "better stop horsing around or somebody will fix his clock". Desormiers, whose sister Pauline was married to Cotroni, dismissed the threat. On 22 July 1973, Desormiers, was gunned down in a bar.

On 10 July 1973, two Cotroni family soldiers were killed by French-Canadian outlaw bikers working for heroin dealer Angelo Facchino, which prompted a meeting between Cotroni and Paolo Violi on 31 July 1973. The meeting was wiretapped by the police, and Cotroni said of the killers that they were: "crazy, crazy, crazy... They've killed something like 10 guys already!" It was agreed that Cotroni would have the "crazy, crazy, crazy" bikers killed, while Violi would have Facchino killed. On 2 September 1973, Facchino was killed by two Cotroni hitmen, Tony Vanelli and Moreno Gallo. Another Cotroni family soldier, Tony Di Genova, was subsequently killed. In another wiretapped talk, Violi expressed much rage at Cotroni, whom he stated wasted too much in hunting down the "Frenchmen". Violi stated: "I told Frankie to leave the Italian [Facchino] to me and hit the Frenchmen first... He should have gone into the club, clients or no clients, lined everybody up against the wall and rat-a-rat-tat!" On 9 November 1973, Cotroni together with Frank D'Asti, Paul Oddo, Gudio Orsni and Jorge Asafy Bala were indicted in New York on charges of smuggling nine kilograms of cocaine from Mexico into New York city on 9 January 1971.

On 8 November 1974, Cotroni was arrested following an extradition request from the United States alleging that he had smuggled $3 million worth of cocaine imported from Mexico into the United States. Cotroni fought the extradition request right up to the Supreme Court of Canada, which declined his request, thus leading to this extradition. On 7 January 1975, Thomas Puccio, the assistant U.S. district attorney for New York, told a jury that Cotroni along with Frank D'Asti were "the middlemen" who brought the "buyers and sellers together". In 1975, with connections to the Bonanno family of New York City, Frank Cotroni was convicted in the United States of smuggling $3 million worth of cocaine into New York City through Mexico and sentenced to 15 years in prison; he was paroled after four years on the condition he not return to the United States. Cotroni at his trial spoke much about his love for his children. Peter Edwards, the crime correspondent of the Toronto Star wrote, "Even those who understood that he was a seasoned criminal knew he was telling the truth when he spoke of his love for his young children". While in prison, Frank met fellow inmate, French-Canadian Réal Simard, nephew of Armand Courville, a long-time associate of Vic Cotroni. Simard would become Frank's driver and eventual hitman upon their release in 1979. Frank considered Simard a nephew. Another French-Canadian protégé of Cotroni's was Claude Faber, who had married his niece and who specialized in bringing unions under the control of the Cotroni family. Faber, whom the media often described as Cotroni's right-hand man, was later convicted of cocaine trafficking and for the 1982 murder of Claude Ménard.

"Unlike traditional Mafia crime bosses, who dealt exclusively with Italian associates, Cotroni forged ties with outside criminal groups. He was more a product of Quebec society than a product of the traditional underworld [whose parents were from the Calabria region of southern Italy]. And he was one of the first to open doors to criminals of other ethnic backgrounds."

— Antonio Nicaso, an expert Mafia journalist.

=== Cotroni–Rizzuto war ===
During the violent Mafia war with the Sicilian faction of the family led by Nicolò Rizzuto in Montreal, Paolo Violi (who was acting capo for Vic Cotroni) and his brothers were murdered along with others through the mid-1970s to the early 1980s until the war ceased and the Rizzuto family took over. During his time in the "Mafia Row" at the U.S. federal prison in Lewisburg, Cotroni strengthened his connections with American Mafiosi, which is believed to have saved his life upon his return to Montreal. The Rizzuto family did not wish to assassinate someone so closely linked to American Mafia leaders and who had drug smuggling connections that extended around the world.

While at Lewisburg, Cotroni brought some $850,000 in counterfeit U.S. currency together with the printing plates for producing the counterfeit cash and attempted to lessen his sentence by making a plea bargain to reveal to the Federal Bureau of Investigation (FBI) the location of the said plates and counterfeit currency. The Canadian criminologist Steven Schnedier called Cotroni's proposed plea bargain a "scam" that he attempted to commit against the U.S. Department of Justice. One Bonanno family capo, Alphonse "Sonny Red" Indelicato, unaware of the fraudulent nature of Cotroni's offer, ordered him killed as a "rat" who had violated omertà. A Genovese family capo, William Masselli, had to inform Indelicato that Cotroni was not violating omertà. In a phone call tapped by the FBI, Masselli was heard saying: "They were gonna whack this guy out for nothing. See how you can get whacked out for nothing?... They were almost gonna mark that guy wrong, that Cotroni, Frank Cotroni. So Sonny Red calls me down this week, and I know him good, Sonny Red... That's why I'm showing you this and I want you to go, it goes no further than here because that guy happens to be with us. I wanna know what the fuckin' story is behind it, in the meantime I gotta go back down there Monday or Tuesday and tell him you're marking the guy for no fuckin' reason". The U.S. Department of Justice, knowing that Cotroni was essentially attempting to buy his way out of prison with his "scam" offer to reveal the location of the counterfeit money and plates, declined his proposed plea bargain.

The Calabrian faction continued to operate with Frank as acting boss for his ill brother after the early 1980s. Edwards wrote in his biography of Cotroni that when he returned to Montreal on 25 April 1979, he "looked more like a prince returning from the Crusades than a trafficker coming home from Lewisburg's Prison Mafia Row. His hair was worn in a well groomed, cavalier style, flowering halfway over his ears. And his eyes shone even brighter than his perfect teeth as he strode through Dorval Airport in Montreal, his New York lawyers John Iannuzzi in tow." Cotroni's return to Montreal marked the moment that he become a celebrity in Montreal. Frank had been overshadowed by Vic Cotroni and Paolo Violi, but with Violi murdered and Vic dying of cancer, Frank became the Cotroni whom the media focused its attention on. Frank kept a high profile, attending boxing matches and hockey games, and cruising around Montreal in his Lincoln Continental driven by Simard. A militant fan of the Montreal Canadiens hockey team, Cotroni was always at the Molson Arena to watch their games and likewise he was a constant presence at boxing matches. Simard later wrote in his 1987 autobiography Le Neveu that Cotroni was embittered by the rise of the Rizzuto family at the expense of his own, and he intended to take back the status of the premier Mafia family in Canada from the Rizzutos.

Frank first ordered Simard to kill Michel "Fatso" Marion in January 1980, who was ripping off his rackets. Simard killed Marion while he was eating breakfast at a diner, giving the coup de grâce on Frank's order. In June 1981, Simard murdered Giuseppe Montegano, a low-level cocaine dealer in Montreal, at Frank's son Francesco's private club, as he was suspected of being a police informant and had hostilities with Francesco. After a meeting with Michel Pozza had gone badly, Cotroni turned to Simard and said "Something has to be done about him", which the latter understood as an order to kill him. Pozza came from Trento in northern Italy and in 1976 had become a money launderer and the consigliere to the Cotroni family, which was an unusual promotion for somebody not from southern Italy. On 27 September 1982, Pozza had dinner with Cotroni and Simard, with the former pressing him to cease his shifted allegiance to the Rizzuto family. Midway through the dinner, Simard left early while Cotroni gave Pozza a handshake at the end, saying they would always be friends. Afterwards, Pozza went home where Simard was waiting for him, and shot him in the head on his driveway.

Cotroni continued his alliance with the Genovese family, being linked to 115.5 pounds of heroin seized by the U.S. Customs on 27 January 1982 from a Genovese-owned warehouse in Brooklyn, which was believed to have been smuggled with Cotroni's help. An FBI report of 17 May 1982 stated that a senior member of the Genovese family "is dealing junk [heroin] on a large scale with Frank Cotroni out of Canada". The report further stated this man "travels to Montreal on a regular basis to set up the wholesale shipment of 'junk' from the Cotronis in Canada to the United States, and that the Cotronis have strong connections in Sicily which give them an unlimited supply of 'junk'". The FBI found out that on 26 July 1982, Cotroni wired US$93,000 from Montreal to a bank in Italy as a payment for a shipment of heroin that was due to arrive in New York on 26 July 1982. In 1983, Cotroni was indicted by a Connecticut grand jury on one count of conspiring to traffic in heroin with five other men in New York City, and three counts of illegally transporting more than $5,000 from Bridgeport, Connecticut, to Montreal.

=== Expansion into Ontario ===
In July 1983, Frank sent Simard to Ontario where he met with Johnny Papalia in Hamilton on behalf of Frank. Papalia, the most powerful Mafia boss in Hamilton, accepted Simard's presence in southern Ontario as the Cotroni family outranked the Papalia family; the crucial moment in the Papalia–Simard meeting occurred when the latter phoned Cotroni in Montreal and then handed the phone to Papalia where Cotroni confirmed that Simard represented him. Frank seized the Ontario market, with Simard bringing Quebec strippers to Toronto clubs, where he allowed Papalia to put his pinball machines in his clubs.

Cotroni frequently visited Toronto in the company of the boxer Eddie Melo who served as his bodyguard where he usually met Simard and Rocco Zito. Cotroni always stayed at the Delta Chelsea Inn, where a young woman who worked there was also his mistress. With Papalia co-opted into working with the Cotroni family, Cotroni was well placed to take control of Toronto underworld. Domenic Racco, the boss of the Siderno Group, was a drug addict known for his immature behaviour while the Commisso brothers had been imprisoned in 1982. In late 1983, Roy McMurtry, the Ontario Attorney General, summoned all of the police chiefs in Ontario to a secret conference in Toronto, where in a joint memo to McMurtry they collectively stated: "By far our greatest concern must be the Cotroni family of Montreal... Needless to say, we consider [Frank] Cotroni our most serious threat". Cotroni was reported to have stated that Toronto was just as lucrative a market as Montreal, but unlike Montreal, the police in Toronto were not as corrupt, making Toronto a more difficult market to operate.

In November 1983, Simard and associate Richard Clément killed Mario Héroux, but unknowingly only severely wounded Robert Hétu, in their Toronto hotel room after they conspired to kill Clément. Hétu testified against Simard and Simard was arrested and convicted, until he became informant against Frank Cotroni and the family; this resulted in an eight-year sentence for manslaughter against Frank, Francesco and two associates in 1987 for the Montegano murder. To replace Simard as his Toronto agent, Cotroni hired the boxer Eddie Melo. On 16 September 1984, Vic Cotroni died of cancer, leaving Frank as boss.

=== Boxing ===
Cotroni, an avid boxing fan, dominated the boxing industry in Quebec. Operation Borgia by the Royal Canadian Mounted Police concluded that Cotroni had close links to 40 boxers, trainers and promoters in Toronto, Hull, Cornwell, Winnipeg, Montreal and Boston. Cotroni was closely linked to two Toronto boxers, Eddie Melo and Nicky Furlano, both of were trained by Travis Sugen, who in turn was another friend of Cotroni's. It is generally accepted that boxing fights in Canada were rigged by Cotroni as one policeman noted, "Sometimes they missed [when they swung at] a guy and he still fell down". The Ontario Provincial Police alleged that a boxing match in Toronto in April 1984 between Furlano and Aaron Pryor had been rigged by Cotroni.

A Royal Commission under Justice Raymond Bernier of the Quebec Sports Safety Board examined boxing, with the Bernier commission interviewing 105 people between October 1984 and July 1985. The report, which was presented in March 1986, was so damning that much of the report was censored by the Quebec government, although parts of the censored portions were leaked to the journalist Michel Auger, the crime correspondent of Le Journal de Montréal, who had those portions published in his newspaper. Bernier wrote: "If this happened in baseball or football or hockey, it would be a national scandal". Bernier called Cotroni "the guiding spirit" of boxing in Montreal. Bernier wrote that the Fighting Hilton Family of boxers were working for Cotroni and the boxing fights in Montreal were "probably" rigged. The commission stated that Cotroni was treated like royalty whenever he attended a boxing match anywhere in Canada. The Bernier commission wrote that boxers in Quebec as a condition of their employment were required to sign exploitative contracts that ensured that they had to hand over half of their earnings from not only their boxing fights, but also from any non-boxing jobs they might hold to people associated with Cotroni.

The report stated that Cotroni was paying the bills of the boxer Dave Hilton Sr., including his rent, groceries, furniture and clothing. Cotroni was described as the only man who could control the alcoholic Hilton Sr. and in turn controlled the careers of Hilton's four sons, all of whom were boxers. One Montreal boxing promoter, Henri Spitzer, stated that "the father [Hilton Sr.] is always drunk and I need Cotroni's help to keep him in line". The report also stated that Cotroni and his associates "have a percentage of certain boxers' revenues", stating that an agreement had been signed in November 1981 that the boxer Dave Hilton Jr. would share half of his earnings to Cotroni, to the sum of $100,000. The Bernier commission accused Cotroni of exploiting the Hilton family, who were "victims of their youthful ignorance and their thirst for glory". The report stated a contract signed between the Hiltons and the American boxing promoter Don King on 31 January 1985 was largely the work of Cotroni. The lawyer for the Hiltons, Frank Shoofey, was mostly excluded from the talks, with the negotiations being conducted by the lawyers for Cotroni and King. The report concluded: "The Hiltons have conceded all and received little in return. For example, the minimum purse for an eventual championship fight is a ridiculously low $150,000". The report stated that the actual value of a championship fight for the Hilton brothers should have been closer to $500,000.

A police wiretap showed that Cotroni had called Hilton Sr. from his jail, where he was being held at the time, to tell him that the contract with King was "a good one". Schoofey told The Globe and Mail that he was unhappy with the contract the Hiltons signed with King, saying: "I would have gotten a million-dollar guarantee for the boys, with big bonuses up front". Hilton Sr. praised Cotroni, saying: "There were times when I needed money for rent. He was always there, with no questions asked. He helped a lot of amateur boxers and amateur teams". Cotroni told the media at the time: "I'm not a gambler and I have never put a penny on the Hiltons. I just want the boys to have the money because you should see how they suffered when they were young. People know what I do for the poor people, not just the Hiltons". Shoofey, who testified against Cotroni for the Bernier Commission, was murdered in his Montreal office on 15 October 1985. The journalist Claude Poirier wrote in 2019 that Shoofey had told him shortly before his murder that he had been receiving death threats from people associated with the Cotroni family who were unhappy about his criticism of Cotroni's influence on the Hilton family.

=== Later years and death ===
On 8 December 1987, Cotroni pleaded guilty to manslaughter with regard to the murder charges he was facing due to Simard's testimony. Cotroni lost his court fight against extradition in June 1989 and agreed to face the charges in Connecticut on the condition that he serve his time in Canada.

Two of Cotroni's sons followed him into the family business. Francesco "Frankie" Cotroni Jr. was close to Allan "The Weasel" Ross of the West End Gang. In addition to being charged with serving as the liaison with the West End Gang, Frankie Cotroni was also charged on 10 October 1986 as an accomplice to the 14 June 1981 murder of Giuseppe Montegano, with the Crown alleging that Simard had killed Montegano on the orders of Frank at the prompting of Frankie. On 15 January 1988, Frankie made a plea bargain with the Crown, pleading guilty to manslaughter, for which he served three years in prison. On 17 April 1996, Frankie was again arrested on the charges of drug trafficking, leading him to make a plea bargain, agreeing to eight years in prison in exchange for a guilty plea, but he was released on parole in October 2000.

In 1996, Frank Cotroni and his son were charged with conspiring to import 180 kilograms of cocaine into Canada from Colombia, and on 4 April 1997, was sentenced to seven years in prison. He was released from prison in 2002 after serving four years of the sentence. On 23 August 1998, Cotroni's son Paolo was shot and killed in the driveway of his home in Repentigny by two hitmen, Gérald Gallant and Gérard Hubert. Police initially investigated a theory that Paolo Cotroni was killed over a $250,000 debt he owed to an Asian organized crime syndicate, but the Rock Machine motorcycle gang later became the prime suspects in the murder. Paolo had been dealing with the Hells Angels, rivals of the Rock Machine, and was a friend of Hells Angels biker Scott Steinert. Prior to his death, he had been warned by Rock Machine member Johnny Plescio to cease his affiliation with the Angels. On 26 March 2009, Gallant testified that he and Hubert had killed Paolo in a $20,000 murder contract given by Frédéric Faucher and Marcel "Le Maire" Demers, the leaders of the Rock Machine's Quebec City chapter. On 30 June 2002, Frank Cotroni was arrested for violating his parole conditions by meeting men with criminal records in an Italian restaurant, but was released in August 2002.

In the final two years of Frank's life, he released a cookbook, Cuisine des souvenirs et recettes (Kitchen of Memories and Recipes), published by a subsidiary of Quebecor Media. The cookbook included spaghetti and pizza recipes, but also features traditional Quebec dishes of beans and pork. In the foreword, Cotroni recalled childhood memories of home-cooked Italian meals and delicious dishes at local restaurants and cabarets. He said nothing of his alleged Mafia ties but hinted at his criminal past in the preface. "This book is not an autobiography even if some memories I have recalled touch on specific periods of my life," he said. On 17 August 2004, Frank Cotroni died of brain cancer, at the age of 72.

== Books ==
- Auger, Michel; Edwards, Peter (2012). The encyclopedia of Canadian organized crime : from Captain Kidd to Mom Boucher. Toronto: McClelland & Stewart. ISBN 978-0771030499.
- Edwards, Peter (1990). Blood Brothers: How Canada's Most Powerful Mafia Family Runs Its Business. Toronto: Key Porter Books. ISBN 155013213X.
- Schneider, Stephen (2009). Iced: The Story of Organized Crime in Canada. Toronto: John Wiley & Sons. ISBN 978-0470835005.
