= Réal Simard =

French-Canadian gangster (born 1951)

Réal Simard (born 7 January 1951) is a Canadian gangster from Montreal known for being a hitman for Frank Cotroni of the Cotroni crime family, who later turned informant.

== Early career ==
Simard grew up in an abusive home. Simard's childhood home was on a rowhouse on St. Timothée street, where he grew up with his alcoholic father who beat him. He started his criminal career as a petty criminal, but soon became a professional bank robber. Simard had a lengthy criminal record with convictions for extortion, possession of illegal weapons, and bank robbery. Simard's uncle was Armand Courville, whom he idolized, and it was always his desire to join the Cotroni crime family.

In Simard's early days, he robbed banks with childhood friend Raymond Martel, but Martel was caught in a heist, while Simard avoided arrest. Another bank robbing accomplice of Simard, Jean-Paul Saint-Armand, was arrested and turned informant, which led to his arrest. The court sentenced Simard to six years in prison. Simard is the nephew of Armand Courville, a long-time associate of Frank Cotroni's older brother Vic Cotroni.

== Entering the Cotroni family ==
While Simard was in prison, he met leader of the family, Frank Cotroni, acting for his brother who was ill with cancer; he would become Frank's driver and eventual hitman upon their release in 1979. Simard considered Frank a father figure and looked up to him. Cotroni allowed Simard to drink the cognac he had smuggled into the Parthenais prison while he advised him that bank robbery was both dangerous and not very profitable form of crime. By his own admission, a morally weak character who was emotionally needy and felt a desperate need to feel important, Simard stated that he became a hitman for Cotroni because it made him feel like he was somebody powerful. Simard stated he found from Cotroni the "love, attention, friendship" that he never experienced in the broken home he had grown up in, adding "I had to take care of him. I was with him everyday. I was protecting him". Simard called Cotroni "Uncle Frank" and despite being French-Canadian affected the style of a Mafiosi. Cotroni offered Simard the job of a chauffeur. Simard who was something of a historian when it came to organized crime, embraced the offer as he noted that Al Capone began his criminal career as a chauffeur for Johnny Torrio and Carmine Galante began his criminal career as a chauffeur for Joe Bonanno. Simard saw Cotroni's offer to work as a chauffeur as a chance to enter the Cotroni family.

Despite the weakened status of the Cotroni family, the family still held power and Simard described Frank Cotroni as an unofficial judge and community leader in the Italian-Canadian community in Montreal. Simard described as typical the case of one Italian-Canadian woman who wanted the help of the Cotroni family to leave her abusive French-Canadian husband. Cotroni sent Simard over to warn the man to never strike his wife again and he helped her move out. Cotroni appointed Simard to be the manager of the Prestige Entertainment strippers agency. Besides being in a high-paying position, Simard watched countless young women strip for him as part of their auditions for Prestige Entertainment along with other benefits. Simard described Prestige Entertainment as a "dream job" where he was paid to watch young women strip.

Peter Edwards, the crime correspondent of the Toronto Star, wrote that Simard was a "vain, handsome young French-Canadian" who "fancied himself a yuppie who married an appreciation for the finer material things in life with a sensitivity that included a love for children and a fear of blood". The police considered Simard to be a "thug in designer clothes, both more violent and less disciplined than his boss". Simard was disliked within the Cotroni family as there was a belief that non-Italian associates of the family would not observe Omertà if arrested and instead turn Crown's evidence in exchange for a lighter sentence.

Simard served as a bodyguard-chauffeur for Cotroni, driving him from his Rosemount house to various restaurants and bars in downtown Montreal. In early 1980, as Simard was driving him home, Cotroni told him, "Réal, I want you to make a big step". Simard understood Cotroni's remark as meaning that he wanted him to work as a hitman. During his training to be a hitman, Cotroni told Simard, "you never leave a body without giving it a bullet in the head".

== Hitman ==
Simard's first hit was on Michel "Fatso" Marion on 18 January 1980, who was ripping off Frank's rackets. Marion was a French-Canadian nightclub owner and hashish distributor. Marion had been a friend of the bank robber and professional killer Richard "Le Chat" Blass who had waged a very violent struggle against the Cotroni family in 1967–69 and killed a number of Cotroni family members. Marion was believed to have assisted Blass and killed several Cotroni family members himself. Since Blass himself had been killed in a shoot-out with the Montreal police in 1975, Cotroni saw killing Marion as a way to demonstrate the power of the Cotroni family by killing one of Blass's friends. Cotroni told Simard that he should always shoot his victim in the head to ensure that they were dead. In St. Adèle, Marion was eating breakfast in a restaurant while Simard walked in wearing his usual expensive designer clothes and with a gun hidden in a folded newspaper. Simard killed Marion while he was eating breakfast at a diner, shooting twice in the chest and then gave him the coup de grâce on Frank's order. After killing Marion, Simard went to see Cotroni and he later recalled: "We kissed each other on the side of the cheek. It's an old tradition in Italian families when you do something for the godfather, the family". For Simard, being kissed on the cheek by his boss proved that he was an important member of the Cotroni family, and was now a powerful man. Cotroni told Simard, "I'm so happy for you. You did a good job".

Simard carried out another hit later that year. On 13 December 1980, Simard killed Nicholas Morello, the brother of Giuseppe Morello, an important drug dealer. As Morello was leaving a bar in Saint-Leonard, Simard shot him in the back and then in the head. In April 1981, the drug dealer Giuseppe Montegano had a violent argument with Francesco Cotroni Jr., son of Frank Cotroni, at the Agrigento Social Club with Montegano accusing the Cotronis of selling him diluted cocaine at a premium price. On 14 June 1981, Simard murdered Montegano, at Francesco's private club, as he was suspected of being a police informant and had hostilities with Francesco. Simard planned to kidnap Montegano at the Agrigento Social Club along with his friends Daniel Arena and Francesco Raso and then kill him at a secluded place in the countryside. Cotroni had told Simard that he did not want anyone killed at the Agrigento Social Club, which was owned by his son, as a murder there would have a negative effect on the reputation of the club. However, Montegano sensed a betrayal as he entered the Agrigento Social Club and attempted to flee, leading to Simard shooting him in the back. Simard apologized to Cotroni for the amateurish murder at the Agrigento Social Club, but he was still kissed on the cheek as Cotroni told him he would perfect his craft of being a hitman.

Cotroni had difficulties with Michel Pozza, a moneyman for the Mafia. Pozza was from Trento in the north of Italy and regarded the Calabrian-Sicilian feud with a bemused contempt as he had no loyalties to either faction. The journalist Jerry Langton wrote that Pozza "... was considered something of a financial whiz among a group whose literacy level was questionable at best". Pozza had once served the Cotroni family, but shifted his loyalties to the Sicilian Rizzuto crime family. Cotroni told Simard, "Something has to be done about him [Pozza]". Simard chose as his murder weapon a .22-calibre pistol instead of his usual .38-calibre pistol after Cotroni had told him the former pistol is a better weapon as it causes a bullet to ricochet inside the human body. On 17 September 1982, Simard killed Pozza in front of his house in Mont-Rolland, shooting him six times with two bullets going into his head.

Simard noted that Cotroni was very closely involved in the boxing industry and would often visit the Champion Boxing Club owned by George Cherry to watch the Hilton brothers train. Cotroni was an ardent boxing fan and took over the boxing industry in Canada with boxing matches rigged for his benefit. Simard stated about the boxer David Hilton Jr., "He idolizes him [Cotroni] the same way I idolized Frank Cotroni when I was a kid ... We were always staying there in the gymnasium with girls. David Jr., was always stopping his training and coming to us, talking to the girls, trying to impress them". Simard blamed Cotroni for the decline of the Hilton boxing family. Simard stated that Matthew Hilton was the only one of the Hilton brothers who did not accept money from Cotroni as Simard has said: "He [Matthew Hilton] didn't pay no attention to us. We were a piece of shit to him, you know? And he was right. You know what he was doing? Washing dishes in a restaurant instead of accepting Frank Cotroni's money".

Simard stated that Cotroni "destroyed those kids" as he allowed the Hilton brothers to enter expensive nightclubs and gave them expensive automobiles and stripper girlfriends as gifts, which caused the Hilton brothers to lose their edge in boxing. Simard alleged that because of Cotroni spoiling the Hilton brothers "they were not interested anymore in boxing. So, he killed those kids. Not purposely, but because he didn't know how to be with boxers". Simard stated: "Boxers have to be hungry...Why should people receive some punches in the face if it's not for money?" Boxing promoter Cherry was not impressed with Simard, whom he considered to be a bully. Cherry stated in a 1990 interview about Simard: "He is a guy who's very proud, very fresh. He talks with his nose upstairs, like he owns the world. It was always like that. He likes to give orders and humiliate and all that. I seen him beat a few guys in nightclubs for nothing, for nothing! And the guy wouldn't defend himself because they knew with whom he was hanging around with and they knew all that. So, he was walking around downtown in nightclubs like he owned them".

== Toronto agent ==
In July 1983, Simard moved to Ontario where he met with Johnny Papalia in Hamilton on behalf of Frank Cotroni. At their first meeting at Hanrahan's strip bar in Hamilton, the atmosphere was tense with Papalia clearly unhappy about the prospect of the Cotroni family moving into Ontario while Simard had a brash and cocky attitude. Adding to the tension was that Papalia had brought along three bodyguards. Papalia asked Simard, "Maybe you have friends? In Montreal, for instance? ... Maybe we have friends in common, like F.C. [Frank Cotroni]" Simard replied that F.C. is "my friend", leading Papalia to inquire "Can you get in touch with him? Now?" Simard phoned Cotroni in Montreal and then handed the phone over to Papalia, who was told that Simard was the representative of the Cotroni family and henceforward he was to work with him.

Simard seized the Ontario market, bringing in Quebec strippers to Toronto strip clubs, where he in turn allowed Papalia to put his pinball machines. The strippers from Quebec were the first to engage in nude table dancing in Ontario, which made them very popular. Despite their first meeting, Papalia had a good working relationship with Simard, who spoke fluent English and was always respectful towards him. During a visit to Montreal, Cotroni asked Simard if Papalia was being polite. Cotroni's right-hand man, Claude Faber, who was married to Cotroni's niece, then interrupted to tell Simard, "If he makes any trouble, kill the fucker — he's old enough to die."

He became known as "David". Simard has been linked with Toronto mobster Paul Volpe's November 1983 murder, but no charges were laid. The Satan's Choice hitman Cecil Kirby reported a rumour in the underworld that Vic Cotroni had personally ordered Volpe's murder. However, it was noted that Volpe was a friend of both Vic and Frank Cotroni and that the Cotroni brothers would need the help of an established Toronto gangster to set up a drug dealing network in the Toronto area. With Papalia co-opted, the Cotroni family were well placed to take over Toronto. Domenic Racco, the leader of the Siderno Group, was an immature man with substance abuse problems who was not well regarded in the underworld, while the Commisso brothers had been imprisoned in 1982 after Kirby testified against them.

Simard became the Toronto agent of the Cotroni family, bringing in strippers and cocaine from Montreal into the Greater Toronto Area. Simard owned a silver Mercedes-Benz while having the Toronto office of Prestige Entertainment being located on 329 St. George Street. Simard lived at the Sutton Place Hotel, the most luxurious and expensive hotel in Toronto in the 1980s. During this period, Simard became addicted to cocaine, which affected his judgement. Along with his associate Richard Clément, Simard became convinced that two drug dealers from Montreal who just arrived in Toronto, Mario Héroux and Robert Hétu, who were working for the Cotroni family, were stealing from the family. Simard called Cotroni in Montreal and received permission to kill Hétu and Héroux after he accused both of stealing.

In November 1983, Simard and associate Richard Clément killed Héroux, but unknowingly only severely wounded Hétu, in their Toronto hotel room after they conspired to kill Clément. On 29 November 1983, Simard and Clément went to the Seaway Motel, where Hétu and Héroux were staying. Sometime between 6:30 and 7:00 pm, Simard knocked on the door of room 345. When Hétu opened the door of his room, Simard shot him in the face. Simard and Clément then shot Héroux five times. Hétu, a former soldier in the Canadian Army, had enough presence of mind to play dead after he was shot the first time. Hétu took two bullets to his face, but both bullets missed his brain and his spinal cord. Hétu recalled the scene, "When the shot goes in there is no pain, but you feel your head moving." Hétu held his breath and laid still as he watched Héroux scream "Are you crazy, Clément?" and then the five shots that ended Héroux's life. Despite being French-Canadian, Simard recalled after the shootings, "We kissed each other on the side of the cheek. It's an old tradition in Italian families when you do something for the godfather".

The Toronto police found a blood-soaked Hétu still alive in room 345 with his "shattered jaw hanging by a bloody sinew". Despite his condition and his poor English, Hétu was able to tell the policemen that Simard had shot him. Upon hearing that Hétu was still alive, Simard promptly fled to Montreal and was arrested at his Montreal office. Simard was due to return to Montreal soon anyhow as Cotroni wanted him to murder the boxing promoter George Cherry.

Hétu testified against Simard and Simard was later convicted, until he became informant against Frank Cotroni and the family; this resulted in an eight-year sentence for manslaughter against Frank, Francesco and two associates in 1987 for the Montegano murder. The police launched Operation Si-Co (Simard-Cotroni) which led to the arrests of Cotroni, his son Francesco, Faber, Arena and Raso. At the time of his arrest, Faber was on the brink of moving to Acapulco where he planned to set up a pipeline for smuggling cocaine from Mexico to Montreal. Simard had informed the police about Faber's Mexican plans along with the allegation that Faber had murdered a drug dealer, Claude Ménard, in 1982.

== Life after the Mafia ==
To reward him for his testimony, the Crown ensured that in prison Simard had his own cell complete with a microwave, telephone, an exercise bike and a TV, giving by the standards of Canadian prisons, a very luxurious lifestyle. After being released on early parole in 1990, Simard went into witness protection as the Cotroni family had put a price on his life. In his 1987 biography, Le Neveu (The Nephew), Simard told the book's author, Michel Vastel, that he was deeply moved by reading in French translation of the book Out of a Limb by the American actress Shirley MacLaine, which convinced him that he had a soul and of the reality of reincarnation. Simard stated: "Whatever action one takes will ultimately return to that person-good or bad-maybe not in this life embodiment, but sometime in the future. And nobody is exempt".

In a 1990 interview with Edwards, Simard accused Cotroni of being responsible for the murder of a well known Montreal lawyer, Frank Shoofey, who was killed execution-style in his law office on 15 October 1985. Simard stated that Cotroni had control of the Hilton family boxers, but owing to an extradition request from the United States was willing to sell the contracts of the Hilton family to the American boxing promoter Don King. Shoofey, who acted as the Hilton family's lawyer, had objected that the contract that Cotroni and King negotiated was an exploitive one with King and Cotroni taking the bulk of the profits from the Hiltons' boxing fights. Simard stated that "powerful people" wanted the King-Cotroni deal to go through and, "Frank Shoofey was very disturbing for them. Because he was helping the Hilton brothers".

In a television documentary produced by Vastel about Simard, one reviewer wrote that Simard "has the charm of a gigolo and looks like a cross between heartthrob actor Armand Assante and singer Gino Vannelli." After being admitted on day parole in 1990, followed by full parole in 1994, Simard became active in Quebec separatism, serving as the campaign manager for a Bloc Quebecois candidate in the 1993 election. Subsequently, Simard turned to welfare fraud to support himself, cheating the Quebec government of some $13,000, which led to his parole being revoked. After being arrested in 1999 on charges of welfare fraud, Simard escaped and was discovered in October 2004 to be working as a security guard at the Collège Jean-de-Brébeuf, a private high school in Montreal. He had been working at the school for nine months under the false identity of Charles Bouchard. Simard went back to prison for violating his parole for committing welfare fraud in 2004, and his attempts for parole have since been consistently refused by the parole board.

== Books ==
- Auger, Michel; Edwards, Peter (2012). The Encyclopedia of Canadian Organized Crime: From Captain Kidd to Mom Boucher. Toronto: McClelland & Stewart. ISBN 978-0771030499.
- Edwards, Peter (1990). Blood Brothers: How Canada's Most Powerful Mafia Family Runs Its Business. Toronto: Key Porter Books. ISBN 155013213X.
- Humphreys, Adrian (1999). The Enforcer:Johnny Pops Papalia, A Life and Death in the Mafia. Toronto, Canada: Harper Collins. ISBN 0-00-200016-4.
- Langton, Jerry (2015). Cold War How Organized Crime Works in Canada and Why It's About to Get More Violent. Toronto: HarperColllins. ISBN 978-1-4434-3255-9.
- Vastel, Michel and Simard, Réal. The Nephew: The Making of a Mafia Hitman. Doubleday Canada, Limited, 1989. ISBN 0770423299
