= Michel Vastel =

Michel Vastel

Michel Vastel (20 May 1940 – 28 August 2008) was a Canadian journalist and columnist for Le Journal de Montréal and other medias. He was born in Saint-Pierre-de-Cormeilles, Eure, France and immigrated to Canada in 1970.

Vastel began his career in the Nord-Pas de Calais region. He subsequently moved to Montreal, Quebec, Canada. He first worked at the Government of Quebec and the Quebec Employers Council, then began to write for Le Devoir, La Presse, Quebec City's Le Soleil and Ottawa-Gatineau's Le Droit.

He was also contributor for L'actualité, CKAC and the Société Radio-Canada. He died in Bedford, Quebec on August 28, 2008 from throat cancer.

== Bibliography ==
- Le Neveu (1987, about mafia hitman Réal Simard)
- Trudeau le Québécois (1989, about Prime Minister Pierre Trudeau)
- Bourassa (1991, about Premier Robert Bourassa)
- Lucien Bouchard, en attendant la suite… (1995, about Premier Lucien Bouchard)
- Landry, le grand dérangeant (2001, about Premier Bernard Landry)
- Chrétien, Un Canadien pure laine, 2003
- Nathalie: Briser le silence (2005, about singer and abuse victim Nathalie Simard)

== See also ==
- Politics of Quebec
