= Dave Hilton Sr. =

Canadian boxer (1940–2023)

Personal information
- Born: August 29, 1940 Edmundston, New Brunswick, Canada
- Died: July 2023 (aged 82)

Sport
- Sport: boxing

Dave Hilton Sr. (August 29, 1940 – July 2023) was a Canadian professional boxer. He won the Canadian championship in three different weight divisions. Hilton was the father of former super middleweight world champion, Dave Hilton Jr., and light middleweight world champion of boxing, Matthew Hilton.

Hilton fought between 1958 and 1976, winning 65 of his 81 fights. As a teenager, he fought as a Featherweight, winning the national championship in 1959. From 1958 onward, Hilton was a close friend of the gangster Frank Cotroni. In 1959, Cotroni drove Hilton from Montreal to Quebec City, where he won the Featherweight national championship. Cotroni told Hilton he liked to do a "little rassling" himself and noted that his nickname in Montreal was "the Cyclone" as he considered to be one of the toughest fighters in the Cotroni family. Hilton had a "savage fighting style", but was only paid $500 per fight. During this time, Hilton started to abuse alcohol and often showed up drunk at his fights. Hilton came to be dependent on Cotroni to motivate him. Likewise, Cotroni paid Hilton's rent and for his groceries, making him and his family very much dependent on Cotroni. In 1990, Hilton stated that allegation that he and his sons lost matches for Cotroni were "lies" and called Cotroni his best friend, saying: "I have no regrets whatsoever. He's still my friend".

As Hilton's career progressed, he saw an increase in weight and moved up to the Welterweight division, where he competed for over a decade. In 1971, he secured the Canadian Light Middleweight championship, and within the same year, he added a third title to his name by claiming the Canadian Middleweight championship.

Although Dave Hilton Sr. garnered recognition during his boxing career, his role as a manager and trainer for his three sons brought him the most attention. All three of his sons achieved Canadian championships, with two of them even becoming world champions.

Throughout their journey, the Hilton family has faced legal issues and tragic events. Hilton Sr. was barred from entering the United States temporarily after past crimes were revealed.

Dave Hilton Sr. died in July 2023, at the age of 83.

== Books ==
- Edwards, Peter (1990). Blood Brothers: How Canada's Most Powerful Mafia Family Runs Its Business. Toronto: Key Porter Books. ISBN 155013213X.
