= Roger Baulu =

Canadian radio and television host

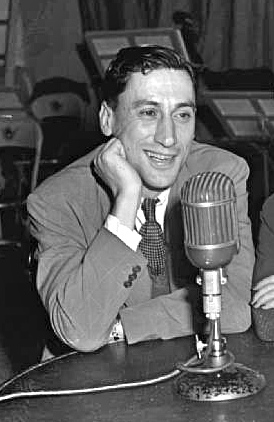
- Roger Baulu in 1944.
- Born: 28 February 1910; Montreal, Quebec, Canada
- Died: 17 September 1997 (aged 87); Montreal, Quebec, Canada
- Resting place: Notre Dame des Neiges Cemetery
- Occupation(s): Radio host, television presenter, actor

Roger Baulu, OC (28 February 1910 – 17 September 1997) was a Canadian radio and television host. He was a pioneer on the airwaves of Montreal radio station CKAC and on Ici Radio-Canada Télé radio and television. In 1990, he was inducted into the Canadian Association of Broadcasters Hall of Fame.

After his death in 1997, he was entombed at the Notre Dame des Neiges Cemetery in Montreal.
