= FLQ Manifesto =

Manifesto from the Front de libération du Québec

The FLQ Manifesto was a key document of the group the Front de libération du Québec. On 8 October 1970, during the October Crisis, it was broadcast by CBC/Radio-Canada television as one of many demands required for the release of kidnapped British Trade Commissioner James Cross. It criticized big business, the Catholic Church, René Lévesque, and Robert Bourassa, and even branded Pierre Trudeau "a faggot" ("tapette").
