= Capodecina =

Branch head within a Sicilian Mafia family

A capodecina (literally 'head of ten', also called caporegime in the American Mafia) is the head of a decina, a branch within a Sicilian Mafia family. In the larger families, a capodecina is selected by the head of the family and coordinates units of about ten people.

Mafia members are organized under the supervision of a capodecina who reports his activities to his superiors, who may be the consigliere or even the boss of the Mafia family himself. The term derives from dieci ('ten'), suggesting that each would be in charge of ten men. The term was mentioned as early as the 1880s in Sicily to describe the organisation of the Fratellanza, a Mafia-type organisation in Agrigento, in the south of Sicily.

The Mafioso Melchiorre Allegra spoke of a capo della decina in his 1937 testimony. He said a family would split into groups of ten men each when it became unmanageably large. (Note: Twentyfive pages of Allegra’s testimony were published in 1962 in the newspaper L'Ora by Mauro De Mauro. See: Testimony of Melchiorre Allegra Archived 2012-03-20 at the Wayback Machine, ExLEGI website)
