= Joseph Todaro =

Joseph Todaro may refer to:

- Joseph Todaro Jr. (born 1945/46), Buffalo, New York businessman and organized crime figure
- Joseph Todaro Sr. (1923–2012), Buffalo, New York businessman and Mafia boss
