= Buffalo crime family =

Organized crime group based in New York, US

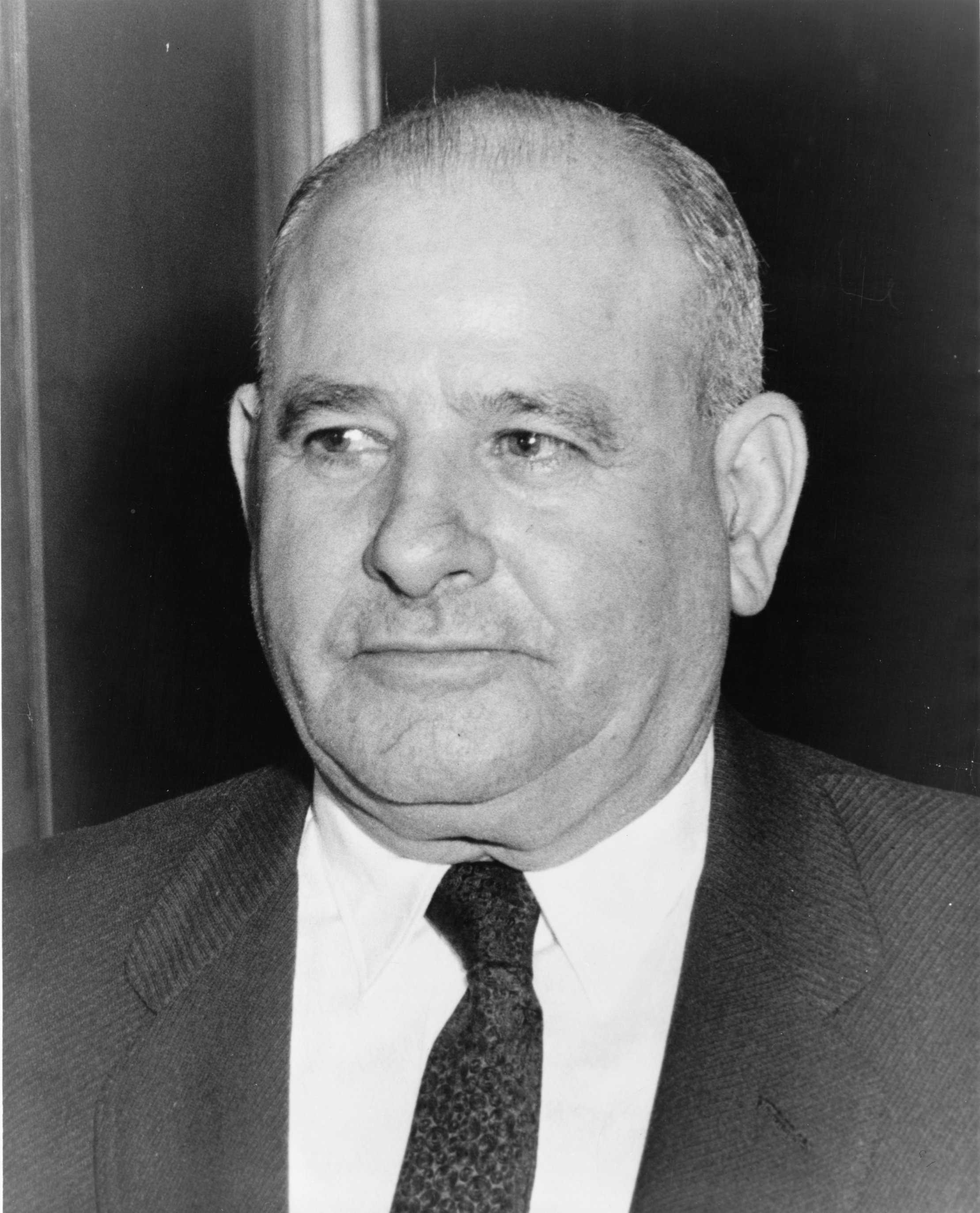
- Stefano Magaddino, source of 1922–1974 name Magaddino crime family
- Founded: c. 1910; 116 years ago
- Founder: Angelo Palmeri
- Named after: Stefano Magaddino
- Founding location: Buffalo, New York, United States
- Years active: c. 1910–present
- Territory: Primarily the Buffalo–Niagara Falls metropolitan area and the Toronto–Hamilton metropolitan area, with additional territory throughout Western New York, Southern Ontario and Northwestern Pennsylvania, as well as Las Vegas and South Florida
- Ethnicity: Italians as "made men" and other ethnicities as associates
- Membership (est.): 30 made members (2018)
- Activities: Racketeering, gambling, bookmaking, loansharking, extortion, labor racketeering, drug trafficking, burglary, art theft, prostitution, assault and murder
- Allies: Bufalino crime family; Chicago Outfit; Five Families; Los Angeles crime family; Luppino crime family; Papalia crime family; Rochester crime family; Hells Angels MC; Outlaws MC; Schuele Boys
- Rivals: Musitano crime family; Rizzuto crime family; Siderno Group; and various other gangs in the Buffalo area

The Buffalo crime family (Note: Also known as the Magaddino crime family, the Todaro crime family, the New York State crime family, the Buffalo Mafia, the Upstate New York Mafia, and the Arm.) is an Italian American Mafia crime family based in Buffalo, New York. Criminal investigators assert that the family operates throughout Western New York, Erie, Pennsylvania, and Hamilton, Ontario, Canada. The Buffalo family is purported to hold strong connections with the Hamilton-based Luppino and Papalia families. According to the U.S. Department of Justice, the current boss of the Buffalo crime family is Joseph A. "Big Joe" Todaro Jr., having assumed the role after his father, Joseph E. "Lead Pipe Joe" Todaro Sr., retired.

== History ==
=== Early origins ===
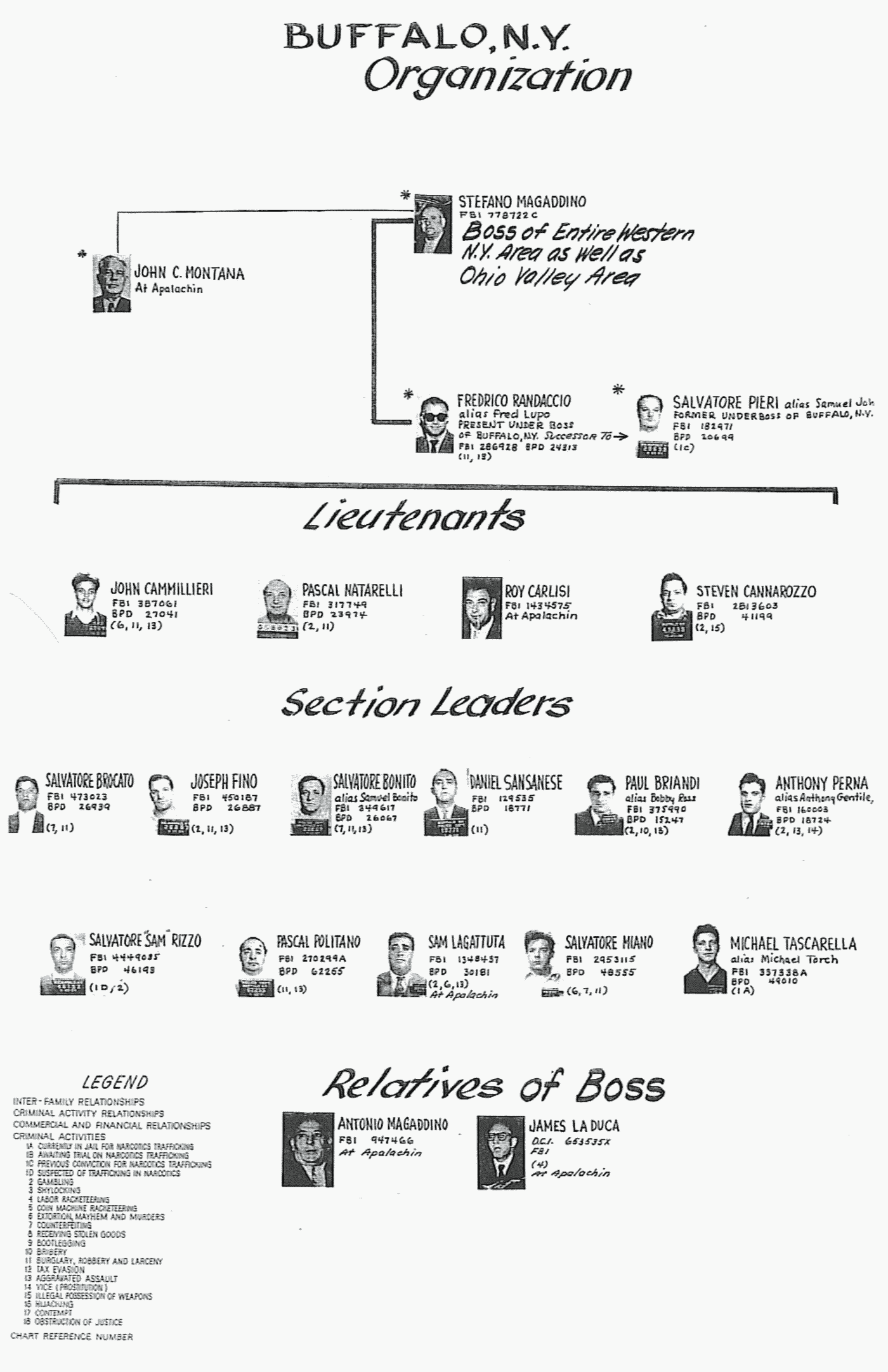
Chart of the Buffalo family in 1963

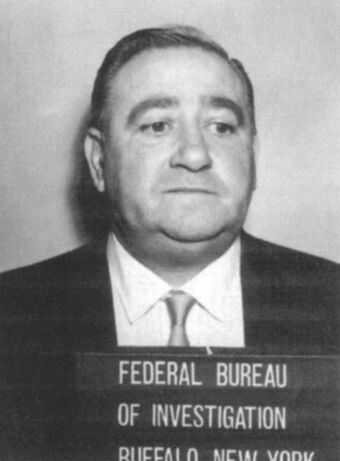
FBI mugshot of Peter Magaddino, the son of Buffalo family boss Stefano Magaddino

In the early 1900s, Angelo Palmeri emerged as the first Mafia boss in Buffalo, New York. By 1912, Palmeri stepped down, assuming the role of underboss, which allowed Joseph DiCarlo to become the family's new boss.

In 1921, Stefano Magaddino, an influential member of the Castellammarese clan, fled to Buffalo to avoid murder charges in Avon, New Jersey related to the death of Camillo Caizzo, the man who had killed Magaddino's brother Pietro. Magaddino had first immigrated to New York City from Castellammare del Golfo, Sicily, in 1902, and joined the Castellammarese clan in Brooklyn. The Castellammarese clan consisted of mobsters originating from Castellammare del Golfo, which included the Magaddino brothers and their cousins the Bonanno brothers. In 1922, Buffalo's crime family boss Joseph DiCarlo died and Magaddino quickly succeeded him as the new boss.

The Buffalo crime family continued to gain power during the Prohibition era through bootlegging. In 1931, the family boss, Stefano Magaddino, became an original member of The Commission, the governing body of the American Mafia. Magaddino's strongest ally on the Commission was his nephew Joseph Bonanno; the two Mafia bosses were from the same Sicilian town of Castellammare del Golfo. The Commission decided in 1931 that Stefano Magaddino and his Buffalo family would control Ontario, Canada, and that Joseph Bonanno and his Bonanno family would control Quebec, Canada. The Buffalo family remained strong and relatively united until his leadership was challenged in the 1960s and split into factions.

Magaddino's empire began to crumble in 1968, when the FBI found $500,000 stashed away in Magaddino's funeral home and his son's attic. "At that time, Magaddino had been telling his underlings that money was tight, and he could not afford to pay them Christmas bonuses," Hartnett said. "People began to stop trusting him when we found all that money."

The internal war continued after Magaddino's death from natural causes on July 19, 1974, but ended in the early 1980s when Joseph Todaro Sr. became the boss.

=== Todaro Sr. era ===
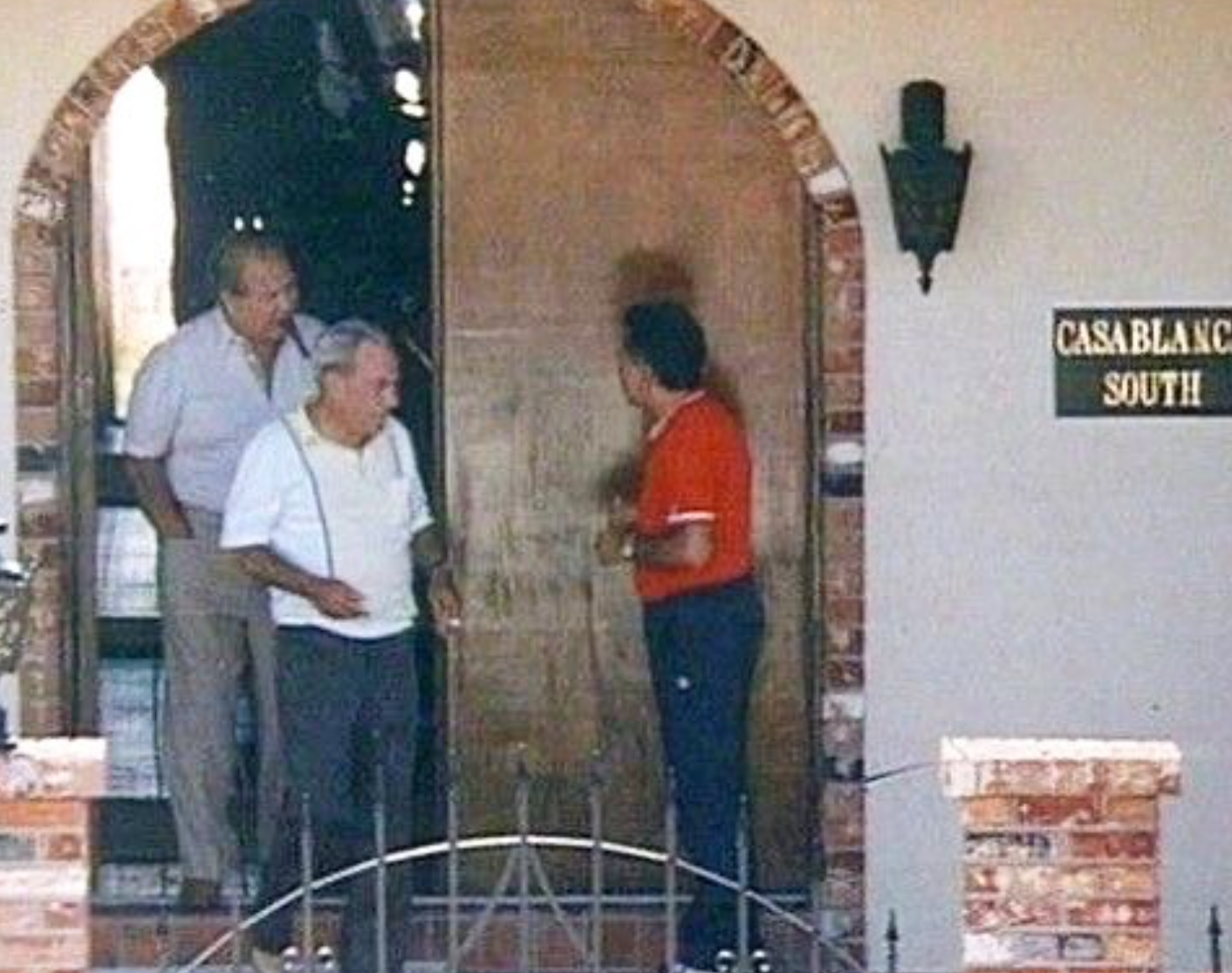
FBI surveillance photo of Buffalo boss Joe Todaro (L) along with Bufalino Underboss Eddie Sciandra (C) and Philadelphia boss Nicodemo Scarfo (R) meeting at Scarfo place in Fort Lauderdale Florida in 1986

When Todaro Sr. took over the Buffalo family many members had been operating within the Laborers' International Union of North America Local 210 for years, while avoiding police scrutiny and continuing to operate illegal activities. In 1989, Joseph Todaro Sr. and his son Joseph Todaro Jr. were identified in an FBI gambling investigation as the leaders of the 45 made member Buffalo Mafia family. The FBI investigation claimed that Joseph Todaro Sr. and Joseph Todaro Jr. were in control of various criminal activities that included labor racketeering, bookmaking, loansharking and narcotics trafficking. It was also claimed that Joseph Todaro Jr. was running the Mafia family on behalf of his semi-retired father Joseph Todaro Sr. who was splitting time between his Tonawanda and Florida homes. The FBI stated that local 210 member Leonard F. Falzone controlled a loansharking operation for the Todaros and brothers Victor and Daniel Sansanese who were also members of local 210 controlled a bookmaking operation for the Todaros. It was also revealed that during the investigation the FBI had planted a recording device in Falzone's union-owned car in 1988, but that recording device was unable to provide any evidence linking the Todaros to any illegal gambling.

The information provided by the listening device planted in Falzone's '87 Buick was responsible for the dismantling of Torina drug ring which was doing "more than $2 million in street sales of cocaine annually in the Buffalo area." Special Agent George Preston, chief of the DEA's Buffalo office told reporters, "This is a mob-controlled drug ring." G. Robert Langford, special agent in charge of the Buffalo FBI office said, "Conversations overheard in the car of Leonard Falzone indicated that this drug operation was being directed by the mob hierarchy in Buffalo," although there was not enough evidence to charge Falzone or Todaro in the ongoing investigation at that time. Early arrests in this case included known mob associates: Joseph "Pepe" Cannizzaro, Albino "Sha-Sha" Principe, and Salvatore "Sam Naples" Napoli.

The investigation into the Torina drug ring revealed Todaro and Falzone were "involved in a Las Vegas-to-Buffalo pipeline for cocaine and other illegal activities." On March 20, 1990, Las Vegas police arrested three Buffalo natives Louis Giambrone, Joseph Amoia and Lawrence Panero, all three were identified as associates of the Buffalo mob. Charles Torina, a Buffalo native who was described as a key link in the drug pipeline from Buffalo to Las Vegas, had previously worked as a pit boss in a Las Vegas casino.

In 1990, Canadian police arrested 14 suspects in a drug ring that had connections to organized crime in Buffalo and Niagara Falls. According to a law enforcement official who spoke under the condition of anonymity, "Any drug activity or any organized-crime activity in St. Catharines, Hamilton and Niagara Falls must be approved by the Buffalo family." The mob families in those cities, and in Toronto, answer to Buffalo." Those arrested were described as associates of a Niagara Falls, New York, businessman named John Anticoli, who was serving a 10-year term in federal prison. Law enforcement told reporters that "two of the suspects are considered high-ranking members of a Hamilton organized-crime family under the indirect control of the Buffalo mob." Anticoli was described by the FBI as "one of the biggest drug dealers ever arrested in Western New York." He pleaded guilty to possessing 270 pounds of marijuana, conspiracy to distribute cocaine, tax evasion, and failure to pay taxes on cocaine profits. Of the 14 suspects arrested, Carmen Barillaro, Nicodemo Bruzzese, and Dominic Vaccaro were said to be "made members" of a Hamilton-based Mafia family that reports to Buffalo organized crime leaders.

In 1996, Joseph Todaro Sr. and his son Joseph Todaro Jr. were listed among 24 alleged organized crime figures who were accused of influencing the Laborers International Union of North America since the 1960s. The Laborers local 210 forced Joseph A. Todaro Jr., Frank Bifulco, Salvatore Cardinale, John Catanzaro, Leonard Falzone, Sam Frangiamore, Bart Mazzara, Robert Panaro, Donald Panepinto, John A. Pieri, Joseph R. Pieri, Charles Pusateri, Joseph Rosato, Danny Sansanese Jr., Victor Sansanese, Louis Sicurella and Vincent "Jimmy" Sicurella out of the union.

In late 1996, the Buffalo family, along with the Los Angeles crime family, joined forces to take over a loan sharking and auto insurance fraud racket in Las Vegas controlled by Herbert Blitzstein, a Chicago Outfit associate. The L.A. underboss Carmen Milano, along with L.A. soldiers Stephen Cino and Louis Caruso, and L.A associates Johnny Branco and Peter Caruso, originally planned to rob and steal Blitzstein's jewelry. After robbing Blitzstein, the L.A. mobsters planned to have Buffalo family soldier Robert "Bobby" Panaro fence the stolen jewelry. Carmen Milano decided that Buffalo family boss Joseph Todaro Sr. would receive a piece of Blitzstein's Las Vegas rackets. The job of robbing Blitzstein was given to Peter Caruso, but Caruso changed the plan and decided to murder Blitzstein and take over his Las Vegas operations. On January 6, 1997, L.A. associates Antonio Davi and Richard Friedman shot and killed Blitzstein in his own home.

In 1997, the Buffalo family's Canadian faction boss Johnny Papalia and his lieutenant Carmen Barillaro were murdered by hit man Kenneth Murdock. When the police arrested Murdock in 1999, he decided to become a government witness. Murdock told authorities that he was ordered by brothers Pasquale "Pat" Musitano and Angelo Musitano of the Musitano crew to murder both Papalia and Barillaro. According to Murdock, the Musitano brothers had been fed up with being a satellite (crew) of the Buffalo family and having to pay tribute money to the family. Murdock also claimed that he was waiting for Pat Musitano to approve the murders of four Luppino crew members, Natale Luppino and Vincenzo Luppino (the two sons of Giacomo Luppino) and Domenic Violi and Giuseppe Violi (the two sons of Paolo Violi). Also revealed by Murdock was that Pat Musitano had discussed with Quebec Mafia boss Vito Rizzuto and Gaetano Panepinto about Rizzuto investing in Ontario. The Canadian intelligence agencies had observed meetings in October 22–23, 1997, between Pat Musitano and Rizzuto, which become more significant after the deaths of Papalia and Barillaro. Eventually, these agencies were convinced that the Musitano brothers did not act alone in the murders of Papalia, Barillaro, and Enio Mora.

In 1998, these factors led Lee Coppola, veteran organized crime reporter for The Buffalo News, to write an article titled "The Withered Arm". In it he stated: "Today's Buffalo mob—disorganized and all but penniless—is a far cry from its heyday" and that the "last visible remnants of mob power in Buffalo disappeared." However, Coppola's pronouncement was premature.

A 1999 article reported that Canadian intelligence indicated a new "crime lord" linked to the "powerful Todaro crime family" had been installed over the Golden Horseshoe region of Ontario. According to CISC intelligence, the new, yet unidentified, Buffalo boss had a strong relationship with outlaw bikers, unlike his predecessor Johny Papalia, who refused to work with them. As a result of this new, yet shaky, alliance, organized crime expert Detective Sergeant Peter Polcetti of the CISC said: "The Todaro family now controls Niagara, Hamilton, Toronto and Montreal." Gerald "Skinny" Ward was a locally powerful criminal in the Niagara Peninsula who purchased his cocaine from the Magaddino family, and in 1998 began his alliance with the Hells Angels. In 2000, Ward and his gang joined the Hells Angels. The police estimated in 2008 that Ward and the Niagara chapter of the Angels were responsible for selling about 75% of cocaine in the Niagara region. After the Hells Angels national president Walter "Nurget" Stadnick was arrested in 2001, Ward became one of the co-leaders of the Canadian Hells Angels.

In 1999, Joseph E. Todaro Sr. along with his son Joseph A. Todaro Jr. and 16 others were named in a civil racketeering lawsuit for controlling local 210 through the years by various racketeering acts. The court complaint identified Joseph E. Todaro Sr. as boss and his son Joseph A. Todaro Jr. as underboss of the Buffalo family and the owners of La Nova Pizzeria. Todaro Sr. never belonged to local 210, but his son Todaro Jr. served as Local 210 business manager in 1990 before resigning. The charges were based on the testimony of Ronald M. Fino, a former business manager of Local 210 before he became an FBI informant.

Over the course of the later part of the 20th century and the first part of the 21st, the Buffalo crime family declined in influence. Factors included older members slowly turning away from the organization, younger Italian-Americans showing no interest in its operations, an 11-year federal operation that forced the family out of Local 210 between 1995 and 2006, introduction of the New York Lottery depriving the family of a major revenue source (illegal gambling revenue), and the rise of Joe Todaro Jr.'s legitimate pizzeria business.

=== Todaro Jr. and Falzone ===
Todaro Sr. allegedly retired in 2006, leaving many in law enforcement to believe Leonard Falzone had taken his place. However, others thought Falzone was only acting as the "front boss" for the Todaros and that Joseph Todaro Jr. was the acting boss while his father became the senior statesman for the family.

The FBI continued to release the crime family's organizational charts until at least 2006. The Niagara Falls Reporter indicated Leonard Falzone was promoted to the top spot after Joe Todaro Sr. reportedly stepped down in 2006. After the deaths of Todaro Sr. in 2012 and Benjamin "Sonny" Nicoletti in 2013, rumors swirled about who would lead the family. In 2012, Matt Gryta, crime reporter for The Buffalo News, said that many believe the family had "expanded into the new millennium through telemarketing, pump and dump stock scams and internet pornography with the 'family' expanding its operations nationwide." That same year, Dan Herbeck wrote an article about Ronald Fino called "Life after Local 210 for the FBI's inside guy." The article indicated Fino was "skeptical of the Justice Department's claims that mob influences were totally removed from Local 210 and the Laborers international." Ronald believed the federal trusteeship the government established to clean the union "didn't go far enough." Additionally, The Toronto Star's organized crime reporter Peter Edwards indicated that in 2013 the Buffalo Crime Family was seeking to revive itself from recent losses through loansharking at the Casino Niagara in Canada on the American border.

In the late 2000s, news broke about a homeowner association (HOA) scam alleged to have ties to the Buffalo mob. A witness told the FBI that the Silver Lining Construction company was controlled by the New York Mob and that its owner, Leon Benzer, thought of himself as a "Soprano" because of his association with attorney John V. Spilotro, the nephew of Vegas mobster Tony Spilotro. "Investigators also disclosed a key player in one of the HOA takeovers," was Paul Citelli, who "was known to have ties to the Buffalo mob." According to George Knapp, I-Team reporter for CBS news affiliate KLAS NewsNow channel 8 in Vegas the FBI said Citelli "is affiliated with the Buffalo mob." Joseph Bravo, another defendant in this HOA scam, was indicted with Paul Citelli for being a part of a Las Vegas to Niagara Falls cocaine trafficking ring run by the Buffalo mob from the late 1980s to mid 1990s, when it was considered "the dominant La Cosa Nostra family on the streets of Las Vegas."

=== Todaro Jr. and the Canadian underboss ===
In March 2017, nearly 20 years after Coppola's article "The Withered Arm", Dan Herbeck wrote a similar piece titled "The Mafia is all but dead in Western New York". In it, the FBI field office in Buffalo stated that only "scattered remnants that are no longer believed to be active or organized remain." The piece also highlighted many of the same factors that Coppola's 1998 article cited for the decline of the Buffalo crime family.

However, arrests by the Royal Canadian Mounted Police in Project Otremens indicate the pronouncements about the Buffalo Crime Family's demise were overstated. In November 2017, the FBI and Canadian newspapers indicated the family is still active.

In November 2017, Giuseppe (Joe) and Domenico Violi, who have longstanding ties to the Buffalo Mob, were arrested on narcotics trafficking charges. These charges show a continuation of the long-established mafia drug trafficking triangle from Toronto/Hamilton, Ontario to Buffalo and Montreal to New York City established by Stefano Magaddino and his cousin, Joseph Bonanno. Michael McGarrity of the FBI said the Otremens operation "unearthed and dug up the roots of a partnership extending from New York City to Buffalo and Toronto to Montreal, proving once again that Italian organized crime groups have evolved far beyond the neighbourhood cliques of days gone by."

Additionally, Peter Edwards in The Toronto Star wrote, "The arrests also hit members of the Buffalo crime family headed by the late Joe Todaro." The US Department of Justice said that Canadian law enforcement authorities had arrested various members and associates of the Bonanno, Gambino, and Todaro crime families on charges that include narcotics trafficking. In response to these arrests, Canadian journalist Adrian Humphries wrote:

Among those arrested in Canada are members of the Todaro organized crime family, based in Buffalo, according to U.S. authorities. The Todaro crime group was built by the now-deceased Joseph Todaro Sr., who took over the Buffalo Mafia once led by the influential boss Stefano (The Undertaker) Magaddino.

Further, in September 2018, Peter Edward reported that "the Buffalo Mob isn't dead, despite some media reports." According to his article the Buffalo/Todaro Crime family is strong enough to call the shots in the recent mob war between the Musitano and other crime families in the Hamilton underworld. This article reports:

- "New York State mob still has considerable influence in the southern Ontario underworld, sources say."
- "I don't think anyone knows for certain how this plays out... One thing's for sure, Buffalo will always have a say north of the border."—Paul Manning, a former Hamilton undercover police officer who worked on organized crime investigations.
- "Buffalo would have to give approval for high-level killings, sources said, adding that mob leaders there are believed to have turned their backs on one side in the dispute and given tacit approval to the other."
- "They're all supposed to be under Buffalo," one source said of the two feuding Ontario crime factions.
- "Buffalo factions of Traditional Organized Crime are not 'in' Canada per se, but historically have controlled aspects of Canadian 'family business' and do get kickbacks from profits from illicit activity," Manning said.

Reporters allege that Al Iavarone of Ancaster was killed in September 2018 in retaliation for the May 2017 murder of Angelo Musitano. Rumors circulated that the murder was related to "an unpaid debt and rivalries between Niagara mobsters and influence from the Buffalo mob." Revenge was another reason for Angelo's death. James Dubro indicates this hit wasn't just approved by the Buffalo crime family, but ordered by Domenico Violi, later to be revealed as the Buffalo mafia's underboss. Angelo's murder occurred "20 years to the month" after Musitano hitman Kenneth Murdock killed Johnny "Pops" Papalia (the long time Buffalo mob captain and head of the Papalia crime family) and his right-hand man Carman Barillaro (a Buffalo and Papalia crime family soldier).

Additionally, the Toronto Sun claims that the current mob war in Southern Ontario has its roots in the mob conflict that had Paolo Violi and his brothers Francesco & Rocco (Domenico "Dom" and Giuseppe "Joe" Violi's dad and uncles) murdered in Montreal during the late 1970s by the Rizzuto crime family. This was suggested as early as 2010 when Globe and Mail article stated, "A general picture is emerging of the power struggle overwhelming the Rizzutos. It's likely that Calabrese families, largely based in Toronto and backed by big players in New York State, are seizing control after the Rizzutos pushed them aside." In 2019 Brad Hunter explained, "It may have taken years but the Violi family were not going to let sleeping dogs lie." Nicolo Rizzuto Jr. was gunned down on December 28, 2009, followed by the disappearance of his brother-in-law Paolo Renda on May 10, 2010. Renda was the Rizutto crime family consigliere at the time of his murder. Finally, Nicolo Rizzuto Sr. was killed by a sniper on November 10, 2010.

Dr. Anna Sergi (lecturer in criminology at the Department of Sociology, University of Essex, United Kingdom, and deputy director of the Centre for Criminology) confirms the Otremens operation which resulted in the Violi brothers' arrests, indicates New York crime families are using drug trafficking routes they established long ago and that these families are being "reinvigorated" by their long established working relationships with the Calabrian mafia in Canada. However, her article calls into question the current affiliation of the Todaro Crime Family in Buffalo. She indicates it is a "Crime Syndicate" formerly aligned with the LCN (La Cosa Nostra) families of New York. See chart in linked article: New York Crime Families Survive and Collaborate.

On December 3, 2018, Domenico Violi was sentenced to eight years in prison for his role in the mob drug trafficking ring unearthed by Project OTremens. During the investigation, police listened in as the agent and Violi discussed a variety of criminal activity and profit-making opportunities. Violi trafficked approximately 260,000 pills (including PCP, MDMA and meth) to the undercover RCMP agent for more than US$416,000 during which the agent was officially inducted as a "made" member of the Bonanno crime family in Canada. He also received another US$24,000 as his cut of the profit. Wiretaps indicated Violi was made the underboss of the Buffalo crime family by boss Joseph Todaro Jr. in October 2017 in a meeting in Florida; the first Canadian to hold the second-highest position in the American Mafia. After being promoted to underboss, Violi is heard on wiretaps boasting that "he had beaten out 30 other people for the position," indicating the Buffalo family had at least 30 made men, which included Canadian members such as the Violi brothers' uncles, Natale and Rocco Luppino. In his new role, Violi was to "assume control over the operations of the Luppino-Violi crime family and solidify his power base with further and greater collaboration with the New York-based Mafia families." The wiretaps also revealed the activity of The Commission (the governing body of the American Mafia), as Violi's promotion was so unusual that Buffalo crime family boss, Joe Todaro Jr., consulted with The Commission for permission to promote him as Buffalo's new underboss.

=== Current position ===
On January 30, 2019, Cece Luppino, the son of Rocco Luppino, and grandson of Giacomo Luppino, was killed at his parents' Hamilton home. According to wiretaps from the Violi brothers' case, Giuseppe Violi told the undercover agent back in February 2015 that Cece Luppino had been approached about becoming a made member, but Cece had told his father that if he could make money he would be involved, but if not, he doesn't want to be involved; "that there are too many headaches". Hamilton Police have extended their search for Luppino's killer across the Canadian border into the United States, asking Buffalo area police and news agencies to disseminate pictures of the suspect taken from surveillance cameras.

An attempt on Pasquale "Pat" Musitano's life was made outside the office of his lawyer, Joseph Irving, in Mississauga on the morning of April 25, 2019. According to reports, Pat was shot four times, once in the head. The Buffalo News indicated that Musitano "had organized crime enemies in Montreal and Buffalo" and that crime reporter "Peter Edwards said, he was more convinced than ever that the Buffalo mob was a player in the shooting" after "a source kept repeating 'Buffalo' over and over while talking about the incident." Additionally, the CBC News in Canada reported Buffalo underboss Domenico Violi was recorded by a police informant in September 2017 as saying the murder of Angelo Musitano was meant to be a message to his brother Pat and that before Christmas Pat "would be gone" and that would be "one headache out of the way." On July 10, 2020, Pat Musitano was shot to death in Burlington.

On October 12, 2020, longtime Buffalo family member Frank BiFulco died in his home.

In 2020, the FBI and Royal Canadian Mounted Police reported that the murder of Albert Iavarone on September 13, 2018, is linked to the ongoing Mafia war in Hamilton, Canada. It was reported that Iavarone had been associated with the Musitano crime family bosses Angelo Musitano and Pasquale Musitano, before they were both assassinated. The investigation revealed that New York City mobsters arranged with the Los Angeles family, boss Tommy Gambino, to induct Iavarone into the Los Angeles family in 2017. The New York City mobsters wanted Iavarone to be a liaison between the U.S. and the Ontario crime group which upset members of the Buffalo family who oversee criminal activities in Western New York and Hamilton Canada.

In November 2021, Domenico Violi was granted day parole.

In 2019, former DEA agent Joseph Bongiovanni was indicted on charges of bribery, obstruction, and conspiracy. The indictment claimed that between 2008 and June 2019, former agent Bongiovanni had friends who were connected with the Buffalo Mafia family and knew these friends were involved distribution and importation of marijuana and cocaine. In April 2024, Bongiovanni was found guilty on obstruction of justice and making false statements but the jury failed to reach a verdict on the other 12 counts of conspiracy, bribery and drug-related offenses. After his second trial Joseph Bongiovanni was convicted of one count of conspiracy to defraud the United States, one count of conspiracy to distribute a controlled substance, four counts of obstruction of justice, and one count of false statement to law enforcement. At both trials, prosecutors alleged Bongiovanni worked closely with co-defendant Peter Gerace, the owner of Pharoah’s Gentleman’s Club, claiming the club was used for drugs and sex trafficking. Gerace closed Pharaoh's in September 2025 after the conviction blocked him from renewing the club's liquor license.

== Historical leadership ==
=== Boss (official and acting) ===
- 1908–1912 – Benedetto Angelo "Buffalo Bill" Palmeri – stepped down, becoming Underboss.
- 1912–1922 – Giuseppe "Don Pietro" DiCarlo Sr. – died July 9, 1922
- 1922–1974 – Stefano "The Undertaker" Magaddino – died of natural causes on July 19, 1974, at the age of 82.
  - Acting 1962–1967 – Frederico "Freddie Lupo" Randaccio – imprisoned on June 29, 1967
  - Acting 1967–1971 – Salvatore J. "Sam Johns" Pieri – imprisoned
  - Acting 1971–1974 – Salvatore "Sam the Farmer" Frangiamore – appointed by The Commission as boss
- 1974–1984 – Salvatore "Sam the Farmer" Frangiamore – stepped down and later died on November 28, 1999.
  - Acting 1977–1978 – Salvatore J. "Sam Johns" Pieri – arrested on November 20, 1978; died on July 24, 1981
  - Acting 1978–1981 – Joseph A. Pieri Sr. – demoted
- 1984–2006 – Joseph E. "Lead Pipe Joe" Todaro Sr. – semi-retired in 1989, officially retired in 2006; died on December 26, 2012.
  - Acting 1989–2006 – Joseph A. "Big Joe" Todaro Jr. – acting boss for his father Todaro Sr. until 2006 when his father retired
- 2006–present – Joseph A. "Big Joe" Todaro Jr. – after Falzone died, it was revealed that he was the boss
  - Acting 2006–2016 – Leonard F. "Lennie Calzone" Falzone – served as "Front boss" died on November 12, 2016.

=== Underboss (official and acting) ===
- 1912–1920 – Benedetto Angelo "Buffalo Bill" Palmeri – became Consigliere
- 1920–1922 – Stefano "The Undertaker" Magaddino – became Boss
- 1922–1953 – John C. Montana – became Consigliere
- 1953–1956 – Angelo Acquisto – caught stealing from the boss and committed suicide on January 11, 1956
- 1956–1967 – Frederico "Freddie Lupo" Randaccio – imprisoned on June 29, 1967
  - Acting 1964–1967 – Salvatore "Sam" Pieri – was released from prison on May 7, 1963
- 1967–1974 – Peter Magaddino – the son of boss Stefano Magaddino; stepped down
  - Acting 1969–1971 – Joseph M. Fino – arrested September 1971
  - Acting 1971 – Daniel "Boots" Sansanese – arrested September 1971
  - Acting 1971–1974 – Rosario "Roy" Carlisi – died April 29, 1980
- 1974–1981 – Salvatore "Sam" Pieri – became Acting Boss; arrested on November 20, 1978; died on July 24, 1981
  - Acting 1978–1981 – Joseph A. Pieri Sr. – became Acting Boss; became Underboss
- 1981–1984 – Joseph A. Pieri Sr. – became Consigliere
- 1985–2006 – Joseph A. "Big Joe" Todaro Jr. – the son of boss Joseph Todaro Sr.; became Boss
- 2006–2012 – Benjamin "Sonny" Nicoletti Jr. – Niagara Falls mobster; died on September 3, 2012
- 2012–2016 – Robert "Bobby" Panaro – stepped down
- 2017–2024 – Domenico Violi – Canadian mobster; imprisoned December 3, 2018 released from prison in November 2021 demoted
- 2024–present – Robert "Bobby" Panaro

=== Consigliere (official and acting) ===
- 1920–1932 – Benedetto Angelo "Buffalo Bill" Palmeri – died on December 21, 1932
- 1953–1958 – John C. Montana – stepped down, died in 1964
- 1958–1967 – Antonino "Nino" Magaddino – the brother to Boss Stefano Magaddino; stepped down
  - Acting 1967–1969 – Vincent A. Scro
  - Acting 1969–1974 – Joseph "The Wolf" DiCarlo – son of former boss Giuseppe DiCarlo Sr.
- 1974–1978 – Joseph A. Pieri Sr. – became acting Underboss
- 1978–1981 – Vincent A. Scro – demoted
- 1981–1984 – Joseph E. "Lead Pipe Joe" Todaro Sr. – promoted to Boss
- 1984–1987 – Joseph A. Pieri Sr. – retired
- 1987–2006 – Leonard F. "Lennie Calzone" Falzone – imprisoned 1994; later promoted to "Front Boss"
  - Acting 1994–1999 – Donald "The Turtle" Panepinto – stepped down
- 2006 – Donald "The Turtle" Panepinto – stepped down
- 2006–2013 – Victor Sansanese – stepped down
- 2013–2020 – Frank J. "Butchie Bifocals" BiFulco – died on October 12, 2020
- 2020–2024 – Victor Sansanese – stepped down
- 2024–2025 – Salvatore "Sam Naples" Napoli – died in April 2025
- 2025–present – Victor Sansanese

== Current members ==
=== Administration ===
- Boss — Joseph A. "Big Joe" Todaro Jr. — Boss of the family and owner of the "La Nova" pizzeria in Buffalo. In the early 1980s, his father Joseph Todaro Sr. became boss of the Buffalo family and promoted him to Underboss. In 1996, Todaro along with Leonard Falzone, Frank BiFulco and brothers John and Joseph Pieri were forced out of local 210. In 2006, he became boss when his father Joe Todaro Sr. retired and used Leonard Falzone as his Front boss until 2016 when Falzone died. In 2017, he promoted Canadian mobster Domenico Violi to Underboss of the family with the approval of the New York Bonanno, Genovese and Colombo families.
- Underboss — Robert "Bobby" Panaro — current underboss of the family. Panaro was born in January 1942. He operated a car dealership in Las Vegas. In 1997, Panaro was indicted along with members of the Los Angeles crime family for the robbery and murder of Las Vegas Chicago Outfit associate Herbert Blitzstein. In May 1999, Panaro was acquitted of the January 1997 murder of Blitzstein, as part of a plot to take over his loanshark and insurance fraud operations in Las Vegas. However, he was convicted of conspiracy to interfere with interstate commerce by extortion, a plot targeting Blitzstein, and was sentenced by former U.S. District Judge Philip Martin Pro to over 7 years in prison.
- Consigliere — Victor Sansanese — became the consigliere again after the death of Sammy Napoli. Sananese has been serving as the family consigliere for years. His father Daniel G. Sansanese and brother Daniel Sansanese Jr. were both members of the Buffalo family. He became a made member in the mid-1970s. In 1989, Victor and his brother Daniel Sansanese Jr. were identified as local 210 officials and were accused of controlling bookmaking for the Todaros. In 1996, Sansanese was removed from local 210 where he had been serving as director of training.

=== Caporegimes ===
Buffalo faction

- Caporegime — Unknown

Canadian faction

- Rocco Luppino — capo of the "Luppino crew" in Hamilton, Ontario. His father Giacomo Luppino was a powerful Canadian mobster within the Buffalo family. His brother Natale Luppino is a soldier in the crew. On January 30, 2019, his son Cece Luppino was murdered in front of his brother Nat Luppino’s Hamilton home.

=== Soldiers ===
Buffalo faction

- Salvatore "Sammy" Agro — soldier; born in March 1927. In March 1953, Agro was sentenced to 1 year in prison for conspiracy to deal in narcotics.
- Joseph Bella — soldier; born in December 1972. During a raid at his home in April 2020, cocaine, MDMA, marijuana, drug paraphernalia and a shotgun with ammunition were found at his home. In March 2023, Bella was sentenced by former U.S. District Judge Richard Arcara to 3 and a half years in prison for wire fraud, possession of a firearm, and intent to distribute cocaine.
- Peter Gerace Sr. — soldier in Buffalo. His father in-law was Joseph Todaro Sr., his brother-in-law is boss Joseph Todaro Jr. and his two sons Peter Gerace Jr. and Anthony Gerace are associate's of the Buffalo family. In 1996, Gerace along with Frank Bifulco, Salvatore Cardinale, John Catanzaro, Leonard Falzone, Sam Frangiamore, Bart Mazzara, Robert Panaro, Donald Panepinto, John A. Pieri, Joseph R. Pieri, Charles Pusateri, Joseph Rosato, Danny Sansanese Jr., Victor Sansanese, Louis Sicurella, Vincent "Jimmy" Sicurella and Joseph A. Todaro Jr. were forced out of local 210 LUINA. Gerace later stepped down from his business manager position in Local 210. He had served as Local 210 president, business manager and business agent before he was forced out of the union.
- Peter "Pete" Gerace Jr. — soldier; born in April 1967. In 2000, Gerace was indicted along with Michael Geiger on one count of wire fraud for their part to defraud victims in a telemarketing scheme "From late 1992 until February 1995, the men ran Advanced Distributing Co., a Kenmore firm that cheated customers with promises that they could win a new Cadillac or up to $40,000 in cash." Gerace pleaded guilty to the scheme in 2005 after the trial was delayed over a dispute regarding the admission of evidence. Gerace Jr. was formerly the operator of Pharaoh's Gentleman's Club in Cheektowaga. His father Peter Gerace Sr., who owned the club, married Joe Todaro Jr.'s sister, and his brother Anthony Gerace is also a mobster. On December 17, 2019, his strip club was raided by Homeland Security agents because of his brother Anthony Gerace and retired Buffalo DEA agent Joe Bongiovanni were indicted on drugs and weapons charges. Attorney Paul Cambria Jr. indicated the government may be trying to link Peter Gerace Jr. to his client Joseph Bongiovanni's case, and removed him as counsel. Bongiovanni is a Buffalo-based DEA agent who was indicted for allegedly accepting "bribes to protect his drug-dealing friends who had ties to the Buffalo Mafia." Cambria had defended Gerace in his wire fraud case. In December 2024, Gerace Jr. was found guilty of conspiracy to defraud the United States, bribery, sex trafficking conspiracy, narcotics conspiracy, and witness tampering. According to prosecutors, Gerace used Pharaoh’s Gentlemen's Club to conduct his illegal activities, primarily his drug trafficking business, including the sale of heroin, cocaine, marijuana and Adderall, from between 2006 and 2019. Gerace allegedly made pay-offs to Joseph Bongiovanni, a corrupt DEA agent, who was sentenced to 5 years in prison. Gerace Jr was sentenced to 25 years in prison. As of September 2025, Gerace is incarcerated at the Cattaraugus County Jail in Little Valley, New York.
- Michael "Mike the Gorilla" Masecchia — soldier; born in February 1966. On August 23, 2019, FBI and HSI agents searched Grover Cleveland High School teacher Masecchia's home where they found homemade explosives, stolen firearms, and narcotics as part of an ongoing investigation into organized crime and public corruption. A criminal complaint identified Masecchia as a drug dealer who has a 20-year history of growing and distributing large amounts of marijuana. On September 22, 2020, a grand jury indictment identified Masecchia as "member or associate of 'Italian Organized Crime'" and indicated he had been described by law enforcement as "an associate and possibly a made member of the Buffalo LCN family." At the center of the indictment is the allegation that Masecchia bribed DEA Agent Joseph Bongiovanni to block investigations into himself and others believed to be tied into the local mafia. Masecchia "was the target of several DEA investigations between 2008 and 2019 and yet was never arrested or charged while Bongiovanni was an agent." Michael married Bart T. Mazzara's daughter, Krista. Bart Mazzara was alleged by prosecutors to be a made member of the Buffalo mob. His wife Krista's uncles are Dan and Victor Sansanese. In February 2022, Masecchia was sentenced to over 7 years in prison by U.S. District Judge John Sinatra for intent to distribute marijuana and possession of firearms. According to prosecutors at his trial, Masecchia had served as a marijuana drug dealer since at least 1999, and that Masecchia had been associated with a corrupt DEA agent in Buffalo. During the raid at his home in August 2019, over $28,000 in cash was seized, along with 2 rifles, 5 shotguns, 1 pistol, marijuana and cocaine, steroids and needles, THC edibles, cannabis syrup, drug paraphernalia and 4 mobile phones. In May 2025, Masecchia was released early from prison due to medical issues.
- John A. Pieri – soldier operating in Buffalo. His father Joseph Pieri and his uncle Sam Pieri were powerful members of the Buffalo family. In 1996, Pieri along with his brother Joseph R. Pieri Jr., Joseph Todaro Jr., Leonard Falzone and Frank BiFulco were forced out of local 210.

Canadian faction

- Massimiliano Carfagna — soldier; born in 1968. In March 2018, Carfagna was sentenced to 10 years and a half in prison for cocaine and fentanyl trafficking after he admitted to importing between 200kg to 300kg of cocaine between March and October 2016. He has been arrested as part of Operation OTremens, which targeted the Buffalo, Gambino and Bonanno families.
- Natale "Nat" Luppino — soldier in the "Luppino crew" operating in Hamilton, Ontario. His father Giacomo Luppino was a powerful Canadian mobster within the Buffalo family. His brother Rocco Luppino is the capo of the crew.
- Domenico "Dom" Violi — former underboss of the Buffalo family operating from the Canadian faction. His father Paolo Violi was a capo in the Bonanno crime family operating in the family's Calabrian faction in Montreal before being murdered in 1978 by the Sicilian faction of the family. His grandfather Giacomo Luppino was the boss of Hamilton's Luppino crime family. After the death of his father, he moved back to Hamilton with his mother and brother. His brother Giuseppe "Joe" Violi also operates in the Luppino family. In January 2015, he became a made member of the Buffalo family. In October 2017, Violi met boss Joseph Todaro Jr. in Florida and was promoted to Underboss of the Buffalo family; the first Canadian to hold the second-highest position in the American Mafia. On December 3, 2018, Violi was sentenced to eight years in prison after pleading guilty to trafficking drugs. In November 2021, Violi was granted day parole.
- Giuseppe "Joe" Violi — soldier in the "Luppino crew" operating in Hamilton, Ontario. His father Paolo Violi was a capo in the Bonanno crime family operating in Montreal's Cotroni crime family before being murdered in 1978 by the Sicilian faction of the family. His grandfather Giacomo Luppino was the boss of Hamilton's Luppino crime family. His brother is Domenico Violi is the underboss of the Buffalo family.

=== Associates ===
Buffalo faction

- Peter Capitano Jr. — associate of the Buffalo family. A member of the Pizza Gang who was identified by Ron Fino as a strong associate of Victor Sansanese and Joe Todaro Jr. In 1996 Peter, along with his brother Sam, led a dissident faction that fought the federal trusteeship of Local 210 meant to rid the union of mob control and influence. He was suspended for 1 year and was prevented for holding a leadership position in the local for 5 years.
- Sam Capitano — associate of the Buffalo family. A member of the Pizza Gang who was identified by Ron Fino as a confidant of Joe Todaro Jr. In 1996 Sam, along with his brother Peter, led a dissident faction that fought the federal trusteeship of Local 210 meant to rid the union of mob control and influence. "Capitano attacked Rosetti at one meeting, grabbing a microphone and yelling "Gabe, you got no balls." The next day, the two got into a fistfight and Rosetti fired Capitano from the board—an action Capitano has contested before the National Labor Relations Board. He was suspended from the union for one year and was prevented for holding a leadership position in the local for five years.
- Anthony Gerace — associate of the Buffalo family. His father Peter Gerace Sr. married Joe Todaro Jr.'s sister and his brother Peter Gerace Jr. is the operator of Pharaoh's strip club. On May 10, 2019, Anthony Gerace along with retired Buffalo DEA agent Joe Bongiovanni were indicted on drugs and weapons charges.
- Joseph Edward "Joey" Todaro III — the son of Joseph Todaro Jr., the boss of family, and the grandson of Joseph Todaro Sr., the former boss of the Buffalo family. In October 1989 he was indicted with felony assault for beating William Gorman, a bouncer at Celebrities Nite Club in the Cheektowaga Ramada Renaissance Hotel, with a baseball bat. In June 1993, Todaro along with Frank BiFulco, Gaetano Miceli, John Catanzaro, Frank Tripi, Samuel Amoia Jr. (the grandson of Sam Pieri), Michael A. Muscarella, Larry Panaro, Steve Sacco and Vincent Spano were linked to a Telemarketing firm that had been raided by the FBI. Joey Todaro III runs the family owned La Nova pizzeria in Buffalo with his father.

Utica faction

- Russell E. "Russ" Carcone — operating from Utica. In 1989, Carcone along with his father Benedetto Carcone and others were indicted on racketeering. In December 1990, Carcone, his father Benedetto P. "Benny" Cacrone, Jack J. "Jake" Minicone Jr., Anthony J. Inserra and Jack Zogby were convicted of running a criminal enterprise centered in Utica from 1973 to 1989, and crimes that included extortion, loansharking, illegal gambling, trafficking in stolen property and murder. His father Benny ran operations from the Swap Shop at 512 Albany Street in Utica and forced the local bookmakers to make regular payments to him and his son Russ. In 2000, an indictment charged 25 individuals of the Utica-based shoplifting and fencing ring who stole goods valued in the tens of millions of dollars from hundreds of retail store chains like Wal-Mart, K-Mart, CVS, BJ's Wholesale Club and others stores in and around Oneida, Herkimer, Fulton, Madison, Montgomery, Albany and other counties in Upstate New York. The Utica shoplifting ring worked in teams and stole items for quick resell like razor blades, batteries and compact discs. On March 23, 2004, his father Benedetto "Benny" died.

=== Allied groups ===
Buffalo chapter of the Outlaws

- John "Tommy O" Ermin — currently the national president of the Outlaws Motorcycle Club. Before being promoted, Ermin served as the president of Buffalo chapter of Outlaws and was linked to Buffalo Mafia boss Joeseph "Big Joe" Todaro, Jr. In April 2021, Assistant U.S. Attorney Joseph M. Tripi released information that John Ermin, general manager of Pharaoh's Gentlemen's Club in Cheektowaga, became the international president of the Outlaws.

Niagara chapter of the Hells Angels (Canada)

- Gerald "Skinny" Ward — President of the Niagara chapter of the Hells Angels Motorcycle Club. Ward began associating with the Buffalo family during the late 1990s, buying and re-selling cocaine in Hamilton. Ward began an alliance with the Hells Angels in 1998, before he and his gang joined the club in 2000. By 2008, the police estimated that Ward and the Niagara chapter of the Hells Angels were responsible for selling about 75% of the cocaine in the Niagara region. When Hells Angels Canada national president Walter "Nurget" Stadnick was arrested in 2001, Ward became one of the co-leaders of the Canadian Hells Angels.

== Former members ==
=== Buffalo faction ===
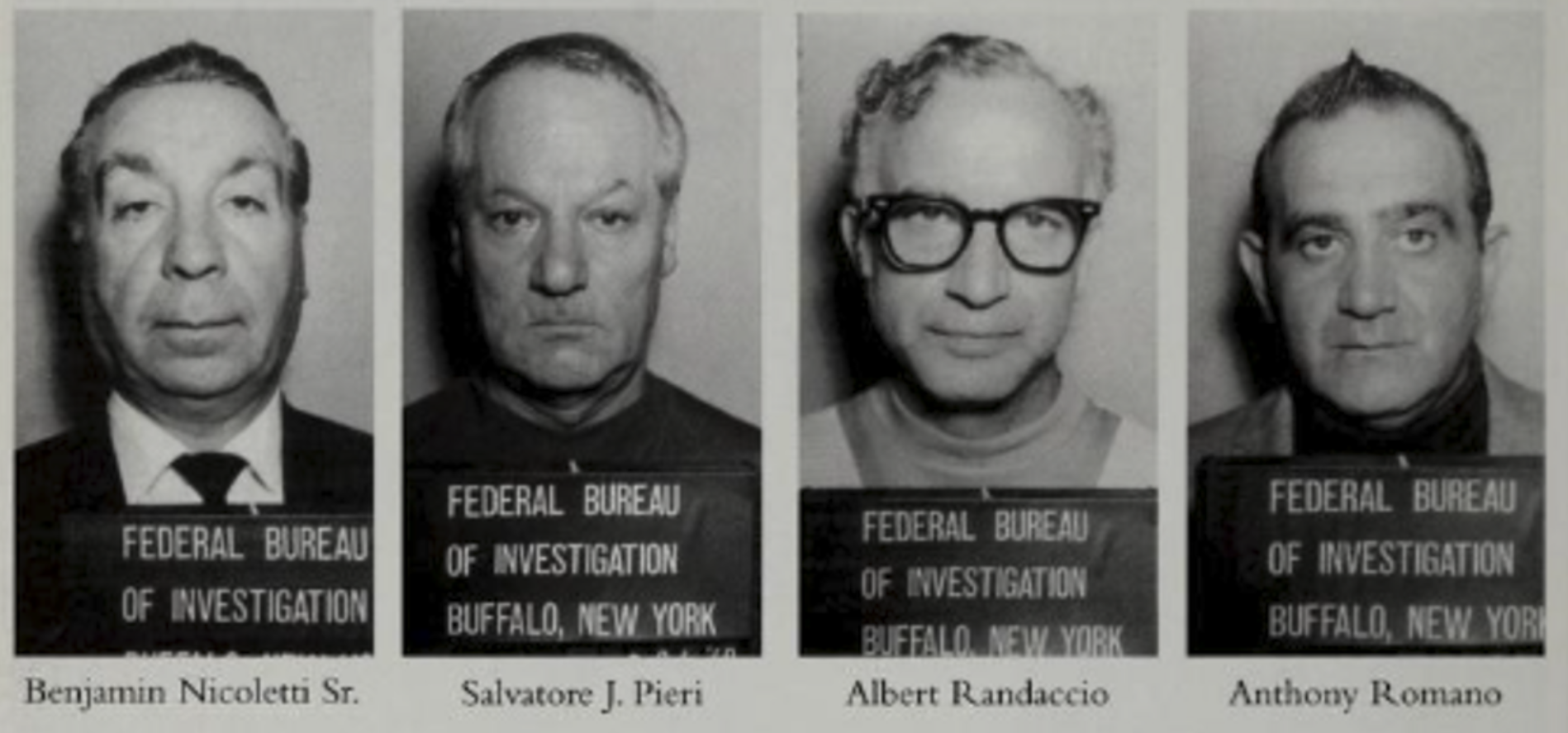
FBI mugshots of Benjamin Nicoletti Sr., Salvatore J. Pieri, Albert Randaccio and Anthony Romano

- Frank J. "Butchie Bifocals" BiFulco – born March 10, 1945, and grew up on Buffalo's West Side. He later became a capo who operated within the Buffalo area. In 1993, BiFulco along with Gaetano "Tommy Chooch" Miceli, John Catanzaro, Joseph Todaro III (the son of Joseph Todaro Jr.), Frank Tripi, Samuel Amoia Jr. (the grandson of Sam Pieri), Michael A. Muscarella, Larry Panaro, Steve Sacco and Vincent Spano were linked to Telemarketing firms that were raided by the FBI. In 1996, BiFulco along with Joseph Todaro Jr., Leonard Falzone, and brothers John and Joseph Pieri were forced out of local 210. BiFulco was the deputy administrator and collection coordinator for the local 210 pension fund before being forced out of the union. In September 2001, BiFulco was arrested by the FBI for torching an associate's rented car in a shopping mall parking lot in an insurance scam. On September 10, 2012, BiFulco was released from prison. BiFulco died on October 12, 2020.
- John R. "Johnny Catz" Catanzaro – became a made man in 1985. In 1980, Catanzaro was ordered by a federal judge appear in a police lineup in connection to the murder of William B. Sciolino, a Local 210 steward. In April 1988, Catanzaro a Local 210 steward was indicted and charged with demanding and receiving $35,000 in wages to guarantee labor peace as a no-show union steward on the construction of a brine pipeline between Wyoming County and Niagara Falls. In November 1988, Catanzaro was tied into a federal three yearlong investigation into international drug-trafficking between Buffalo and Sicily. The investigation concluded with 200 arrested that linked the Sicilian Mafia families (Spatola, Gambino and Inzerillo) and the American Mafia families in Buffalo, New York City, Philadelphia, Chicago and San Francisco with international drug-trafficking. Catanzaro was arrested along with Joseph P. Lombardo, Frank Grisanti, Ronald H. Chimera, Frank J. Mahiques, Fred M. Saia, Gary L. Carter, Paul J. Palladino, Angelo P. Rizzo, Francis Catania, Victor Catania and Paul Catania and they were charged with counterfeiting Rolex watches. In 1990, Catanzaro a local 210 steward was convicted of having a no-show job and sentenced to 27 months in prison. In 1996, Catanzaro along with other members of the Buffalo family were forced out of local 210 LUINA. In March 2000, Catanzaro along with Donald Panepinto, Frank Mambrino, and his son Carmen Mambrino, Joseph DiGioia, Annuncio Cannizzaro and Robert Chimera were indicted and charged with running an illegal gambling business from the Donato Social Club at 188 Grant St. On November 10, 2004, Catanzaro died.
- Leonard F. "Lennie Calzone" Falzone – former acting boss and consigliere. In 1988, the FBI had bugged Falzone's union-owned car for six months in an effort to link the Todaros to illegal gambling but they were unable to get any evidence. In 1989, Falzone was identified as a Local 210 official who controlled a loansharking operation for the Todaros. On July 11, 1994, consigliere Falzone was convicted for his role as the administrator of benefit funds for LIUNA local 210 and for collecting unlawful debts. His brother Frank Falzone replaced him as administrator of benefit funds for LIUNA local 210. In 1996, while Falzone was in prison for racketeering and loansharking he was forced out of local 210 along with Joseph Todaro Jr., Frank BiFulco and brothers John and Joseph Pieri. In 1999, Falzone was named in civil racketeering lawsuit filed by local 210 for his involvement in racketeering to collect unlawful debts. In 2006, Falzone became the acting boss of the family when Joe Todaro Sr. retired. Author Ron Fino suggests that Falzone was only the "fronting boss" for the Todaros. Falzone died on November 12, 2016.

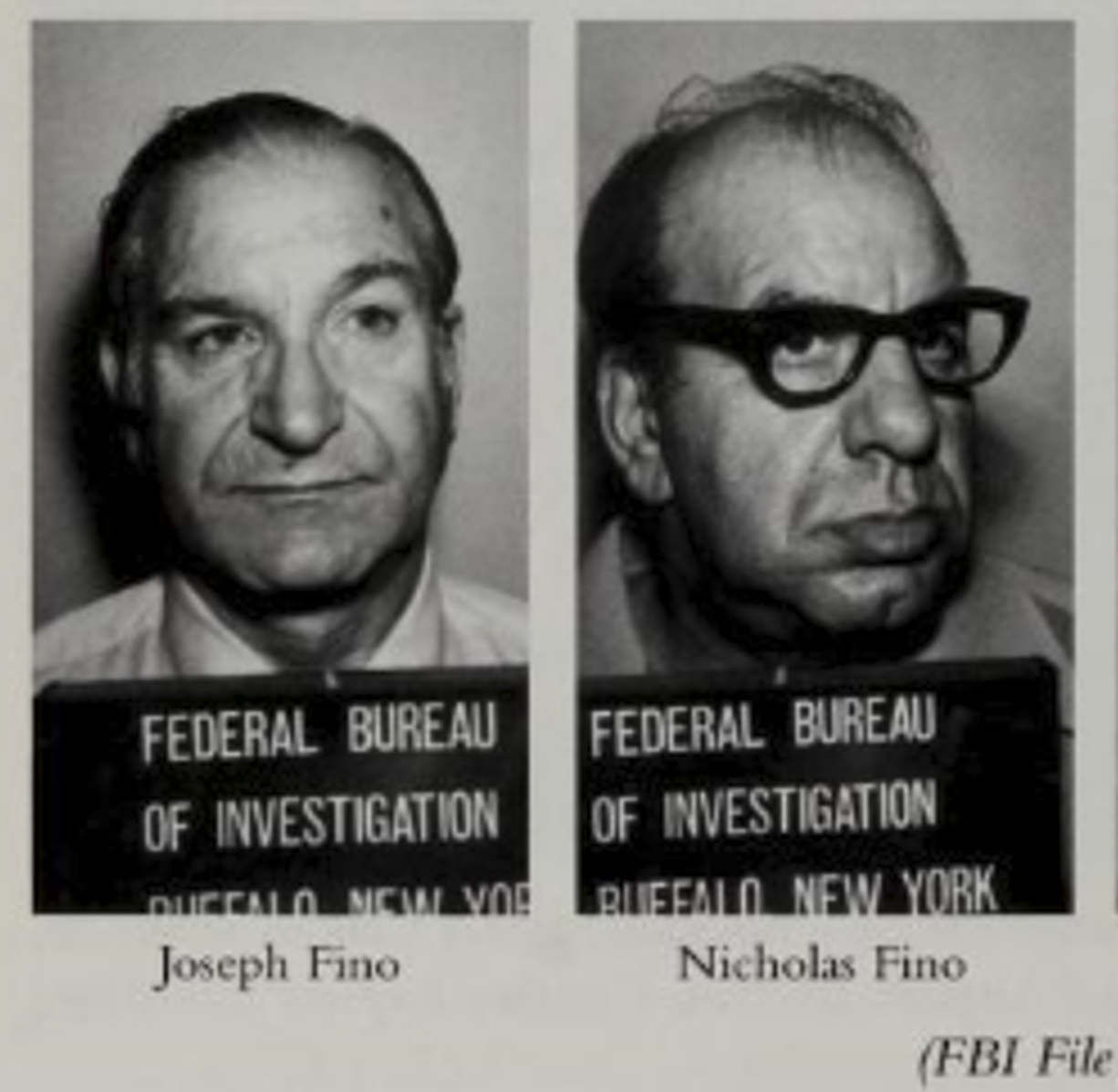
FBI mugshots of Joseph Fino and Nicholas Fino

- Joseph "Joe" Fino – former capo in the family. His son Ronald M. "Ron" Fino later became an FBI informant. Fino was a powerful racketeer of local 210 for the Buffalo family. When boss Stefano Magaddino was arrested in 1968, Fino formed a faction along with John Cammilleri and Daniel Sansanese Sr. that plotted to take over the family. Fino began acting as if he was boss until 1972, when he was summoned by the Commission to explain his actions. When Fino went to the Commission meeting he was accompanied by his allies Daniel Sansanese Sr., Sam Frangiamore and Roy Carlisi. The Commission told Fino after the meeting that Magaddino was still the Boss and his group was to back down. In April 1974, Fino along with John Cammilleri and members of the Rochester faction plotted to take over the family. On May 8, 1974, John Cammilleri was murdered, this left Fino with no more power as Cammilleri's "Nairy's Social Club crew" was taken over by Daniel Sansanese Sr. After boss Stefano Magaddino died in 1974, the Commission installed Sam Frangiamore as the new boss of Buffalo. Fino died in 1984.
- Nicholas "Sonny" Mauro – soldier, former Nicoletti Sr. and Falzone Crew member who was described by police as the king of illegal sports betting in Western New York and was known as one of the biggest bookmakers in the area. Mauro received 14 years for a gambling conviction. In the trial he was called "a crusty war horse with a record of gambling arrests dating from the 1950s. "He called himself 'the bookmaker's bookmaker' when he testified during a hearing of the State Crime Commission in 1960." Police and gambling experts described him as the "biggest known bookmaker" in this region in the "last four decades." Mauro, also, had large gambling operations in Las Vegas. He was convicted of Social Security fraud for arranging a "no show" job at Atlas Auto Glass for his son Charles. His conspiracy to commit bank fraud charge was dropped in the Moore case because it wouldn't add more jail time. Mauro denied claims he was a member of the Buffalo family".
- Salvatore "Sam Naples" Napoli – former consigliere. In 1969, while Napoli worked under brothers Alber and Matthew Billiteri he was charged with loansharking. Napoli was arrested in 1993, for funding narcotics activities and extorting drug dealers and would serve 3 years in prison. Napoli was a member of Local 210 of LIUNA. During 2024, before Napoli died in early 2025, he would advise members near his home in Amherst, NY and hold meetings at a pastry shop on Grant Street.
- Benjamin "Sonny" Nicoletti Jr. – also known as "Mr. Nick", is a former underboss and capo of the "Niagara Falls crew". His father Benjamin J. "Benny" Nicoletti Sr. was the former capo of Niagara Falls in the Buffalo family. In the late 1960s, Nicoletti Jr. worked with his father controlling a sports book operation in Niagara county. On November 26, 1968, Nicoletti along with his father Nicoletti Sr., Peter Magaddino, Sam Pugelese, Gino Monaco, Pasquale Passaro, Augustine Rizzo, Louis Tavano, Michael Farella and boss Stefano Magaddino were indicted on conspiracy and violation of the Interstate Transportation in Aid of Racketeering Act. The charges against Nicoletti Jr. were later dismissed because of illegal wiretaps. In 1977, Nicoletti was a suspect in the November 14, 1977 murder of John Certo, after witnesses saw Certo slapping Nicoletti's niece in Niagara falls bar. On May 2, 1982, his father Benjamin Nicoletti Sr. died. In 1992, Nicoletti was indicted along with Angelo "Bobby" Plumeri, Vincent Palmeri, Anthony Previte, Pasquale M. Accetta, Roy H. Arist, Peter De Loreto, Paul Kaczowski Jr., Alfred Ligamarri Jr., Edward A. Loverde, Samuel Mangione, Charles Ogrodowski, Peter Pietrangeli, Ricardo J. Ross Jr., and Charles Tattersall on illegal gambling charges in Niagara County. In the indictment Nicoletti was identified as a captain in the Buffalo family who had been controlling a bookmaking operation in Niagara Falls since the 1970s. In November 1993, Nicoletti pleaded guilty to a felony of running a multimillion-dollar illegal gambling enterprise and agreed to forfeit assets of $250,000 and serve up to a year in prison. Nicoletti owned a number of properties in the Niagara falls area including a motel. On September 12, 2002, Nicoletti was arrested along with former banker Adam Thomas on racketeering, conspiracy and extortion chargers. Nicoletti along with Thomas set up a betting service based in the Dominican Republic and any bettor in the United States who was late in paying there debts would be visited by thugs. In 2004, Nicoletti was convicted of felony weapon chargers after the police found a couple of high-priced shotguns in his home. In 2006, Nicoletti was promoted to underboss of the family. Nicoletti died on September 3, 2012.
- Donald "The Turtle" Panepinto — former consigliere operating in Buffalo. Panepinto was born on April 28, 1941. He was a longtime member of Buffalo faction and former member of LIUNA Local 210. His two sons Marc and Don Panepinto worked in local 210 and later became attorneys. On September 6, 1993, his daughter Dana Christine Panepinto married Joseph Edward Todaro, the son of Joseph Todaro Jr. In 1996, Panepinto along with other members of the Buffalo family were forced out of local 210 LUINA. In March 2000, Panepinto along with John Catanzaro, Frank Mambrino, and his son Carmen Mambrino, Joseph DiGioia, Annuncio Cannizzaro and Robert Chimera were indicted and charged with running an illegal gambling business from the Donato Social Club on 188 Grant St. In 2014, his oldest son Marc Panepinto was elected into New York State Senate. In late 2018 his son Marc Panepinto was sentenced to two months in prison on public corruption charges. Panepinto died from natural causes on October 10, 2026, aged 85.
- Joseph P. Rosato – became a made man in 1985. In 1990, Rosato was convicted of having a Local 210 no-show job. In 1996, Rosato along with other members of the Buffalo family were forced out of local 210 LUINA. Rosato died on February 9, 2009.

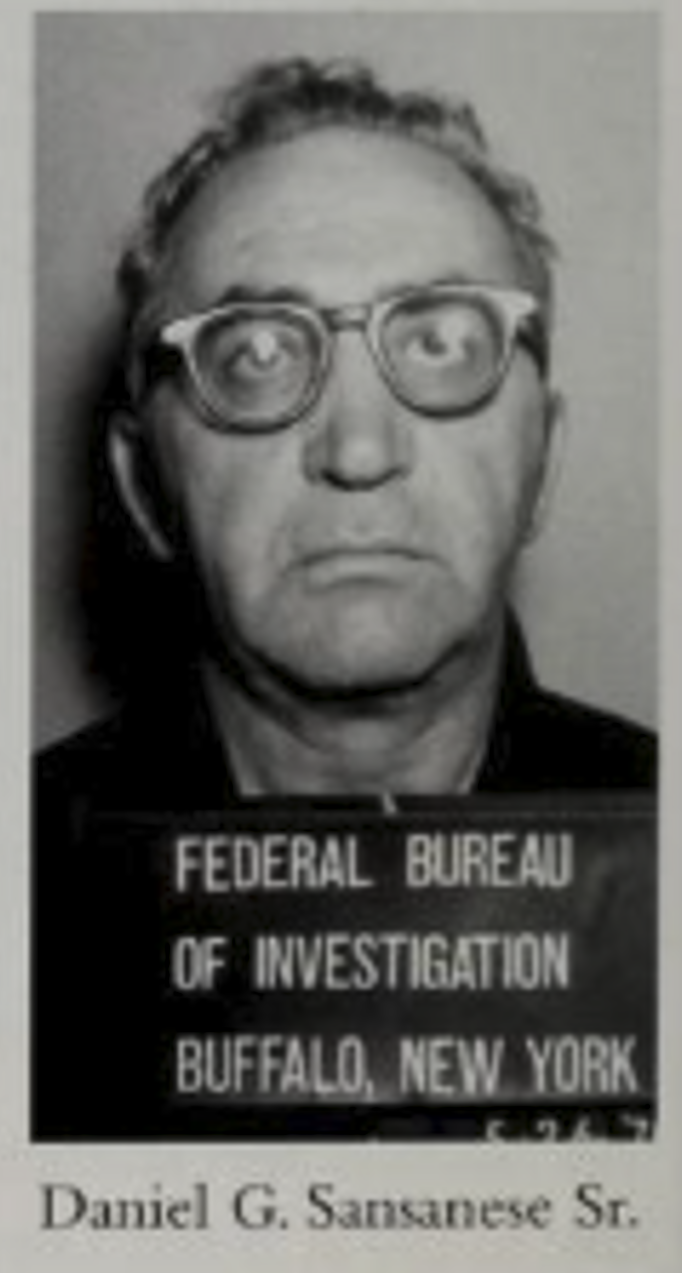
FBI mugshot of Daniel G. Sansanese Sr.

- Daniel J. Sansanese Jr. – became a made man in 1970, and served as secretary-treasurer of Local 210 until his retirement in 1994. His father Daniel G. Sansanese Sr. and brother Victor Sansanese were both member of the Buffalo family. In 1989, Daniel and his brother Victor Sansanese were identified as local 210 officials and were accused of controlling bookmaking for the Todaros. Daniel J. Sansanese Jr. died on June 16, 2003.

=== Canadian faction ===
- Carmen Barillaro – former made member of the Buffalo family. Barillaro was one of Johnny Papalia's top lieutenants and was responsible for controlling gambling, bookmakers and loan sharks in Niagara Falls. On July 23, 1997, Barillaro was murdered by Kenneth Murdock who shot him two times in his Niagara Falls, Ontario home. Barillaro's murderer Kenneth Murdock told police that was hired by the Musitano crew leader Pasquale "Fat Pat" Musitano and his brother Angelo Musitano.
- Giacomo Luppino – former capo of the "Luppino crew" in Hamilton. Giacomo Luppino died of natural causes at the age of 87 in March 1987, whereby his son Jimmy Luppino took over the Luppino family.
- Enio "Pegleg" Mora – former associate of the Buffalo family. In 1968, Mora immigrated to Canada and began working with Siderno Group leader Rocco Zito. Mora later worked with Paul Volpe in Toronto. He eventually became a top lieutenant for Johnny Papalia and was responsible for controlling illegal gambling clubs in Toronto. In 1979, Mora lost his left leg below his knee from a shotgun blast when burglars tried to rob a gambling house that he was protecting. The police suspected that Mora and Papalia were involved in the 1983 murder of Paul Volpe. In the early 1990s, Mora along with Johnny Papalia and Carmen Barillaro borrowed $7.2 million from Vito Rizzuto and the trio refused to pay back the loan to Rizzuto. On September 11, 1996, Mora was murdered as he pulled his gold-colored Cadillac into the driveway of a farm in Vaughan. He was shot four times in the head.
- Frank Papalia – former associate of the Buffalo family. Frank Papalia along with his brother Johnny Papalia led the "Papalia crew" of Hamilton. His father Antonio and mother Maria Rosa Italiano had immigrated to Canada from Delianuova, a village in Calabria, Italy. His father Antonio worked for Canadian mobster Rocco Perri. During his youth Frank Papalia was a boxer before joining his father and three brother's Johnny, Rocco and Dominic into the mafia. His brother Johnny Papalia was a made member of the Buffalo family. When Johnny Papalia became the boss of the Buffalo family's Canadian faction, Frank became his brother's underboss. In 1997, his brother Johnny was killed. Frank took over leading the crew but the crew's influence in Canada declined significantly. Frank began suffering from Alzheimer's in the early 2000s and died on April 15, 2014.
- John "Johnny Pops" Papalia – former made member of the Buffalo family. He was the boss of the Papalia crew of Hamilton. His crew included his three brothers Domenic, Frank and Rocco and his brother in-law Tony Pugliese. Papalia top two lieutenants were Carmen Barillaro who controlled gambling in Niagara Falls and Enio Mora who had control of gambling in Toronto. On May 31, 1997, Papalia was murdered by hitman Kenneth Murdock who was hired by the Musitano crime family leader's Pasquale "Fat Pat" Musitano and his brother Angelo Musitano.
- Paul Volpe – former made member of the Buffalo family who was sponsored by Giacomo Luppino, Jimmy and Harold Bordonaro in Hamilton. Volpe maintained a close relationship with both the Luppino and Bordonaro families in Hamilton. During the 1960s Volpe became one of Stefano Magaddino's top men in Toronto. In 1983, Volpe was murdered, it was suspected that Johnny Papalia and Enio Mora played a role in his death.

== Former associates ==
- Peter A. Capitano Sr. – a former associate. He served as a former business manager, secretary-treasurer, business agent and executive board member in local 210. In 1999, Capitano Sr. was found to be a mob associate and was removed as a trustee of the international union. His two sons Samuel and Peter Capitano Jr. were also members of local 210. Capitano Sr. died on September 1, 2017.

== Government informants and witnesses ==
- Jimmy Fasanella – hairdresser, degenerate gambler and associate of Frank "Chickie Botts" Grisanti and David Petri in the Falzone crew who became a reluctant government witness in the racketeering trial of James Moore. Moore was accused of using his position at Citibank to arrange fraudulent loans for gamblers in debt to mob controlled bookmakers Nicholas "Sonny" Mauro, Bart Mazzara, and Russell "Hymo" Amsden. As a result of this scheme "Moore said, his bank wound up with $17 million worth of legitimate deposits" from Laborers Local 210 which has been frequently investigated for its ties to the Buffalo mafia. Mauro introduced Moore to Local 210 official Sam Caci who introduced him to other labor leaders.
- Ronald M. "Ron" Fino – associate and FBI informant. His father Joseph Fino was a capo in the Buffalo family. In 1964, he secretly began providing the FBI with information of union corruption. In 1970, he served as a business agent in local 210 and later business manager. Fino was later exposed as an FBI informant and testified against all the local 210 union corruption. After testifying Fino continued to work with the FBI and went undercover by infiltrating the Russian Mafia and exposed illegal arms smugglers, child porn organizers, narcotics dealers, and international money launderers.
- Carmen LaBruna – informant who was called a "gangster and outlaw of the first order" by Erie County District Attorney Edward Cosgorave. He became a government informant after his second-degree murder conviction for helping reputed mobster Gino Albini dispose of Elayne Stec's body in a Buffalo sewer in the 1970s. Stec had witnessed Albini kill a man outside a West Side bar. While in prison LaBruna began cooperating with authorities. He related the details of 20 Buffalo mob-related murders that dated to the late 1950s in hopes of reducing his sentence. In 1988, Carman LaBruna was credited for the 15 years he had spent in prison for the murder and a 1969 hotel robbery in Buffalo and paroled. Federal and state authorities had to convince LaBruna not to return to Buffalo after his release and enter Federal Witness Protection Program (WITSEC). He was given a new name and relocated to a western state hundreds of miles from Buffalo. In November 1989 Cape Coral, FL asked Buffalo Police Department to look out for LaBruna. Later that month he was arrested in Ft. Myers for attempted murder, armed robbery, and being a felon in possession of a firearm. He was accused of shooting his roommate, David Kohler, in the side and back while taking his wallet that contained $100. It was reported that Kohler was found by a fisherman in an isolated marsh where he was bleeding profusely some 45 minutes later. A jury failed to reach a verdict in the first trial but a second jury acquitted him. In 1993 Carmen was charged with aggravated battery for stabbing 24-year-old Ted Allen Jordan outside a Cape Coral 7-11 store after an argument. The stabbing was witnessed by an off duty police detective. At the time of this arrest, Daniel Wright, the US Marshal for Buffalo, was unaware of the arrest and could not comment on LaBruna's status in WITSEC. Authorities in Florida indicated LaBruna left witness protection in the late 1980s, lived under his own name and was not worried about the mob finding him.
- Faust Novino – former associate, drug dealer and hitman who was accused of being involved in the murder of Michael Ress who ran a large marijuana trafficking ring with ties to the Buffalo mob. Ress' murder was alleged to have been planned by John T. Sacco. Ress's narcotics were supplied by John C. Sacco Jr., a high ranking mob member who later became and informant. "Sacco, (John C., Jr.) who died of natural causes in 1991, had been shot three times by Novino during a 1976 Connecticut Street hit on Novino for his murder two years earlier of Albert J. Billiteri Jr., son of Buffalo mob member Albert "Babe" Billiteri." Sacco's shooting was the result of a botched hit by the Joseph Todaro Sr. Crew in 1976 and took place in an old warehouse on Connecticut St. Novino was convicted of murdering the son of former Caporegime Babe Billiteri in 1974. After cooperating with the government Faust Novino entered witness protection and was given a new identity.
- David Petri – former associate turned government witness who was threatened by loanshark Frank "Chickie Bots" Grisanti to keep him from testifying against him and his coconspirators in "mob banker" James Moore's racketeering case. According to Petri, Grisanit asked him to modify his testimony against Moore and indicated "Ronald Raccuia, a former city official who has gone into hiding as an FBI witness, is one of several persons who should be looking over his shoulder." Grisanti's statement scared him enough to move his family from Buffalo."
- Fred Saia – former associate who was proposed for membership but "lost his chance when he was involved in a gun deal that went sour and upset some bosses." Saia ran gaming tables at area stag parties in the 1960s and 1970s and booked rock bands for a Cheektowaga night club giving mob leaders a 25% cut. He became a laborer in LiUNA Local 210 in the 1950s because he was friendly with a mob leader. He came to be a government informant after being caught in a cocaine deal because he feared what the Todaros would do alleging "they did not want their people to be involved in narcotics dealing" in the 1980s. His testimony in a union disciplinary hearing resulted Joe Todaro, Jr., Leonard Falzone and 4 other members with alleged mob ties submitting their letters of resignation. Saia allegedly had Vincent "Jimmy" Sicurella and Michael LaPorta torch cars for insurance money. His son Tomas Saia, a convicted cocaine dealer, was indicted for his involvement in mob connected telemarketing companies Grand National Products, Grand American Marketing, Universal Promotions and Northtown Universal Promotions. He owned the first two and was the manager of the other two firms.

== Factions and territories ==
The Magaddino family's operations as centered around Buffalo and throughout New York state, with additional territory in Pennsylvania, Ohio, and Ontario in Canada. The family also maintains links to Castellammare del Golfo in Sicily.

- New York – The family is based in the Buffalo–Niagara Falls metropolitan area, and operates throughout Western New York, including Rochester. The organization is also active in Utica and elsewhere in Upstate New York.
- Ontario – The family operates in Hamilton, and throughout Southern Ontario, including Burlington and Niagara Falls.
- Pennsylvania – The family operates in Erie County.
- Ohio – The family operates in Youngstown, and in the Ohio Valley.
- Nevada – The family operates in Las Vegas.
- Florida – The family operates in South Florida, including Broward County.

== List of murders committed by the Buffalo crime family ==
Name	Date	Reason
Filippo Mazzara	December 22, 1927	Mazzara was shot in the head by a double-barreled shotgun, killed instantly at the age of 38, for encroaching on the Buffalo family territory on Buffalo's west side.
Dominic Mafrici	March 14, 1957	Mafrici was associated with the Cleveland family, in particular with Anthony Milano. Mafrici was shot to death whilst hiding in West New York, for robbing a mob-owned restaurant in Steubenville, Ohio.
Guido Antuono & Leo Bartolomei	March 3, 1958	Antuono, age 29, and Bartolomei, age 23, were associated with the Buffalo-Magaddino family, and were last seen arriving in New York by plane.
Vincent "Bitty" Vazza	September 12, 1958	36-year old Vazza, associated with the Buffalo-Magaddino family, was found murdered in the trunk of his car, for disloyalty concerns.
Frank "Frankie the Stick" Aquino	September 13, 1958	28-year old Aquino was an associate of the Buffalo-Magaddino family. Aquino was found murdered inside of his mother's 1958 Lincoln vehicle in Lackawanna, New York. Aquino and his brother, Fred "Freddy the Fox" Aquino, operated the Bison Hotel. Aquino was murdered for refusing to pay tribute money to the Buffalo-Magaddino family from his rackets.
Fred "Freddy the Fox" Aquino	September 17, 1958	Aquino was murdered 4 days after his brother was killed. Aquino was tortured to death with signs of use of acid on his face and chest. Aquino, like his brother Frank Aquino, was murdered for refusing to pay tribute money to the Buffalo-Magaddino family.
Arthur "Artie Bricks" DeLuca	October 14, 1958	23-year old DeLuca was an associate of the Buffalo-Magaddino family and was often used for muscle work and debt collection, including for the Aquino brothers. DeLuca was found murdered inside of the trunk of his 1957 Cadillac vehicle, he was reportedly strangled to death with wire.
Angelo "Rico" Cicatello	November 29, 1958	32-year old Cicatello was an associate of the Buffalo-Magaddino family, and disappeared in November 1958.
Richie Battaglia	May 23, 1959	30-year old Battaglia was shot and killed inside of his car in Reynolds Alley, Buffalo, New York. Battaglia had previously served as a member of the Aquino brothers crew.
Jimmy Delmont	June 8, 1960	Delmont was found shot and killed in a ditch in San Bernardino, California after he had shot Steve "Stevie Flat Top" Cannarozo, a captain in the Buffalo-Magaddino family.
Nick Tirone	July 23, 1961	22-year old Tirone was shot and killed whilst walking in Prospect Park, Buffalo, New York on the Westside of Buffalo.
William "Shorty" Holmes	August 8, 1961	Holmes was shot and killed in the Bronx, after himself and 18 others were arrested for participating in a $150 million narcotics operation involving the Buffalo-Magaddino family.
Vincent "Vinnie Stugotz" Santangelo & Anthony "Tony Football" Palestine	August 12, 1961	Santangelo and Palestine were reportedly tortured, with them being beaten and strangled, and were found murdered in a field in Lancaster, New York. It is believed that they were killed for committing the unsanctioned murder of Nick Tirone in July 1961.
Albert "The Baker" Agueci	October 8, 1961	Agueci was a soldier for the Buffalo-Magaddino family. At the time of his death, Agueci was indicted for narcotics trafficking. Agueci was found killed, beaten and tortured in a field near Rochester, New York, for being openly critical of his superiors, and he was last seen alive enroute to a meeting with Don Stefano Magaddino.
Lou Scalzo	April 20, 1963	32-year old Scalzo was shot and killed at his home for refusing to pay tribute money to the Buffalo-Magaddino family.
Jake Russo	September 12, 1964	Russo served as the boss of the Rochester crime family from the late 1950s until his murder. It is believed Russo was murdered for offending Don Stefano Magaddino several months prior to his death as Russo resented Magaddino attempting to take control of his illegal gambling operations.
Charles S. Gerass	September 23, 1965	36-year-old real estate salesmen Gerass was in debt to Magaddino family capo Joseph "Lead Pipe Joe" Todaro. He disappeared while en route to meeting Todaro. Gerass was found bound, beaten and shot to death in the trunk of his car in Tonawanda on September 24, 1965. Todaro was identified as the prime suspect in the killing.
Jimmy LiBrize	December 29, 1969	LiBrize was an attorney from Niagara Falls, New York. LiBrize was tortured and killed at his office.
William Conley	February 28, 1970	Conley was an associate of the Buffalo-Magaddino family. Conley was blown up and killed by a grenade attached to his car door after he had left a restaurant in the Southside of Utica, New York.
Gino Albini	June 11, 1970	Albini was shot and killed at his home, after several days he had killed his former girlfriend to prevent her from testifying against him after she had witness Albini murder a man at the Ivanhoe Inn in Buffalo.
Richard Falise	November 11, 1970	Falise was an associate of the Buffalo-Magaddino family. Falise was found strangled to death near a gas station in downtown Buffalo.
Lester Speaker	May 12, 1971	Speaker was an associate of the Buffalo-Magaddino family, and he was shot and killed, and found near a set of railroad tracks.
David Sgroi	July 4, 1971	Sgroi was an associate of the Buffalo-Magaddino family. Sgroi was shot, killed and found near Rome, New York.
John Cammilleri	May 8, 1974	Cammilleri, a 63-year-old Magaddino family capo and labor racketeer, was gunned down outside his restaurant headquarters, Roselands, on the West Side of Buffalo, after a dispute with underboss Joe Fino over control of LIUNA Local 210. Police identified Jimmy Sicurella as the shooter.
Albert "Little Baby" Billiteri, Jr.	September 19, 1974	Billiteri Jr. was a soldier and drug dealer for the Buffalo-Magaddino family, and the son to Albert "Babe" Billiteri, a captain in the family. Billiteri Jr. was shot 6 times and murdered for robbing a member's mother's house and for scamming a New York gangster in a drug deal.
Frank "Frankie D" D'Angelo	October 5, 1974	31-year old D'Angelo was an associate of the Buffalo-Magaddino family, and served as a bookmaker and burglar. D'Angelo was found shot multiple times and killed as he had left Mulligan's Brick Bar in Buffalo. It is believed D'Angelo was murdered for refusing to pay tribute money to the Buffalo-Magaddino family after he had committed a jewellery heist.
William "Butch" Esposito	February 17, 1976	29-year old Esposito was an associate of the Buffalo-Magaddino family. Esposito was found in a field strangled to death as he had allegedly angered the hierarchy of the family for getting himself into a bar fight with a made man in the family.
Robert Reingold	May 31, 1976	Reingold was an associate of the Buffalo-Magaddino family. Reingold was a known counterfeiter and involved in narcotics trafficking. Reingold was found strangled to death in the trunk of his car for an attempted shooting of a Buffalo-Magaddino family member.
Albert "Crazy Al" Marrone	October 3, 1976	Marrone was shot several times and killed near his home in East Utica. It is believed Marrone was murdered for threatening the Colombo family from New York, and was shot by Colombo family members, Jack "Jake" Minicone and Donato "Danny" Nappi, another reason for his murder was that he was openly talkative about expressing his wishes to take over the rackets in Utica.
Albert "Crazy Al" Marrone	October 5, 1977	Rizzo was a soldier for the Buffalo-Magaddino family. It is believed Rizzo was forced to hang himself at his office in Depew, New York following a feud with a gangster from Florida.
Joseph "Handsome Joey" Vara	November 3, 1977	Vara was a bartender and bookmaker within the Buffalo area. It is believed Vara was murdering for having an affair with the wife of Joe Fratello, a soldier in the Buffalo-Magaddino family, whilst Fratello was imprisoned.
John Certo	November 14, 1977	Certo was bludgeoned to death and was found at a garbage dump in Lewiston, New York. It is believed Certo was murdered for assaulting the niece of Benjamin "Sonny" Nicoletti, whom later became the underboss of the Buffalo-Magaddino family during the 2000s until his death in September 2012.
Peter "Pixie Stix Pete" Piccolo	April 19, 1979	32-year old Piccolo was an associate of the Buffalo-Magaddino family. Piccolo was shot in the back of his head at his office in Allentown, New York office for allegedly scamming a man during a cocaine deal.
Raymond "Ray Red" Townsend	September 29, 1979	Townsend was found in his vehicle with gunshot wounds to the face and head for a drug deal gone wrong.
Carlo Rizzo	March 6, 1980	Magaddino family capo Rizzo disappeared en route to his home. He was found in the trunk of his car garrotted to death on April 10, 1980. Rizzo's killing was allegedly ordered by boss Sam Pieri after he and another Buffalo mobster, William Sciolino, discussed family affairs with members of the Cleveland family. The murder of Rizzo was allegedly carried out by Jimmy Sicurela.
William "Billy the Kid" Sciolino	March 7, 1980	40-year-old Sciolino, a Magaddino family associate and alleged FBI informant, was shot in a trailer by a hit team while visiting a construction site on Buffalo's Main Street. Sam Pieri allegedly ordered Sciolino killed along with Carlo Rizzo. Lenny Falzone, Jimmy Sicurella and John Catanzaro were the alleged gunmen.
Bobby Warner	February 8, 1981	Warner was shot and killed by Dilly Spataro at the McKinley Park Inn hotel as Warner was suspected of cooperating with the authorities.
Paul Volpe	February 8, 1981	Volpe had served as the Buffalo-Magaddino family representative in Toronto, Canada. Volpe was found shot to death at the age of 56, inside of the trunk of his car at the Toronto International Airport for reputedly regarding a casino deal in Atlantic City.
Albert "Big Al" Monaco	April 3, 1984	Monaco was an associate and loanshark for the Buffalo-Magaddino family. Monaco was shot and killed by Johnny Pinelli at the home of Dilly Spataro as it was believed Monaco was skimming profits from his criminal operations.
Bobby Schickler	June 9, 1984	Shickler was an associate of the Buffalo-Magaddino family, and was found shot and killed in Allegheny County, Pennsylvania.
Joe San Fratello	February 2, 1985	Fratello was shot and killed in Allentown, Buffalo as it was believed he was murdered over a dispute involving narcotics territory within the Magaddino-Buffalo family.
Robert "Bobby the Body" DiGiulio	April 17, 1985	DiGiulio was shot and killed near his home after he had intercourse with the daughter of a Buffalo family member, and the contract was given to Dilly Spataro.
Johnny Pinelli	September 29, 1986	Pinelli was shot in the back of his head and found in a ditch in Eden, New York, for beating up the daughter of Dilly Spataro, a soldier in the Buffalo-Magaddino crime family.
Michael Ress	August 9, 1989	It is believed Ress was killed for cooperating with the FBI. Ress was last seen alive enroute to a meeting with John "Fat Johnny" Sacco, his partner in a cocaine and marijuana narcotics distribution network.

== See also ==
- Crime in New York (state)
- List of Italian Mafia crime families

== Sources ==
=== Books ===
- Cedilot, Andre. Noel, Andre. Mafia Inc: The Long, Bloody Reign of Canada's Sicilian Clan. Vintage Canada, 2012. ISBN 0307360415.
- Capeci, Jerry. The Complete Idiot's Guide to the Mafia, 2nd Edition: A Fascinating Exploration of the Real People Who Inspired The Sopranos. Penguin, Jan 4, 2005. ISBN 1440625824.
- Humphreys, Adrian. The Enforcer: Johnny Pops Papalia, A Life and Death in the Mafia. HarperCollins, 2000. ISBN 0006384935.
- Czarnota, Lorna MacDonald. Wicked Niagara: The Sinister Side of the Niagara Frontier. Arcadia Publishing, 2011. ISBN 1625841299.
- Griffin, Joe. Mob Nemesis: How the FBI Crippled Organized Crime. Prometheus Books, 2010. ISBN 1615924027.
- Giancana, Sam. Burnstein, Scott M. Family Affair: Greed, Treachery, and Betrayal in the Chicago Mafia. Penguin, 2010. ISBN 1101185570.
- Schneider, Stephen. Iced: The Story of Organized Crime in Canada. John Wiley & Sons, 2009. ISBN 0470835001.
- Edwards, Peter. Auger, Michel. The Encyclopedia of Canadian Organized Crime: From Captain Kidd to Mom Boucher. McClelland & Stewart, 2012. ISBN 0771030495.
- Rizzo, Michael F. Gangsters and Organized Crime in Buffalo: History, Hits and Headquarters. Arcadia Publishing, 2012. ISBN 161423549X.
- Fino, Ronald. Rizzo, Michael. The Triangle Exit. Contento De Semrik, 2013. ISBN 9655501930.
- United States. Congress. House. Committee on the Judiciary. Subcommittee on Crime, United States. Administration's Efforts Against the Influence of Organized Crime in the Laborer's International Union of North America: Hearings Before the Subcommittee on Crime of the Committee on the Judiciary, House of Representatives, One Hundred Fourth Congress, Second Session, July 24 and 25, 1996. ISBN 0160542111.

=== Reports ===
- Richardson, A. (May 1991). Outlaw Motorcycle Gangs – USA Overview (PDF) (Report). State of California Department of Justice, Bureau of Organized Crime and Criminal Intelligence – via United States Department of Justice.
