= Joseph Todaro Sr. =

American mobster

Joseph E. Todaro
- Born: September 18, 1923
- Died: December 26, 2012 (aged 89); U.S.
- Other names: "Leadpipe Joe", "Papa Joe"
- Occupations: Crime boss, Mobster
- Children: Joseph Todaro Jr.
- Allegiance: Buffalo crime family

Joseph E. Todaro (September 18, 1923 – December 26, 2012), sometimes known by the nicknames "Leadpipe Joe" or "Papa Joe", was a prominent Buffalo, New York, businessman, and the Mafia boss of the Buffalo crime family. He was usually referred to as Joseph Todaro Sr. to distinguish him from his son Joseph Todaro Jr.

== Biography ==
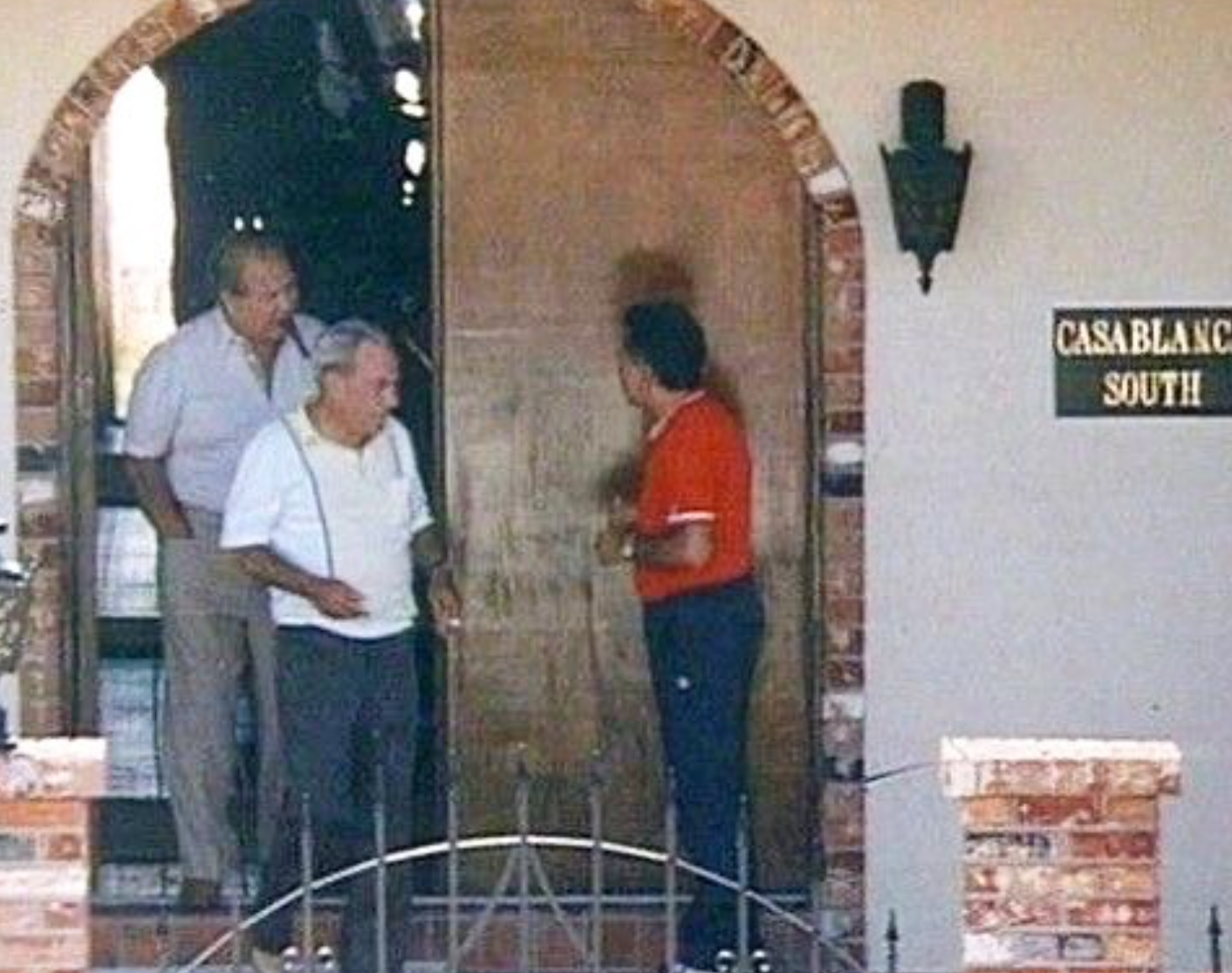
FBI surveillance photo of Buffalo boss Joe Todaro (L) along with Bufalino Underboss Eddie Sciandra (C) and Philadelphia boss Nicodemo Scarfo (R) meeting at Scarfo place in Fort Lauderdale Florida in 1986

Joseph Todaro was born to Anthony Todaro and Sarah Frangiamore on September 18, 1923. He later married Josephine Santamauro and had two children, his son Joseph Jr. and daughter Linda (later she married Peter Gerace).

Joseph Todaro Sr., known as "Lead Pipe Joe" to his crime family associates, was a caporegime in the Buffalo family who reportedly controlled bookmaking operations along with his son, Joseph Todaro Jr., and his brother, Richard Todaro. By the early 1960s, longtime Buffalo crime family boss Stefano Magaddino had begun his retirement and left the day-to-day activities of the crime family to acting boss Frederico Randaccio. During the 1960s and 1970s, Randaccio's base of operations was the Blue Banner Social Club, located on Prospect Ave. The club was controlled by family soldier Benny Spano. Todaro Sr. was a big earner in the Buffalo family, controlling numerous rackets of bookmaking, card and dice games, loansharking rings, Las Vegas junkets, and labor rackets. In May 1967, Todaro Sr. and 35 other men were arrested at a party. Todaro Sr. was charged with "consorting with known criminals,” a charge that was later dismissed.

On March 13, 1982, Todaro Sr. was involved in a large brawl outside of the Buffalo Playboy Club while trying to help Daniel Sansanese Jr. According to FBI logs, Todaro Sr. conducted mob affairs and meetings from local hotel rooms and VIP rooms out of the Executive Inn, the 747s disco, and the old Playboy Club, which all were located near the Greater Buffalo International Airport in Cheektowaga, New York.

In 1984, Buffalo family boss Samuel Frangiamore retired. Todaro Sr. became the new boss and made his son, Joseph Todaro Jr., the new underboss in the family. Todaro Sr. was acquitted of federal tax evasion charges in 1985, after it was alleged he had underreported his income for years 1976, 1977 and 1978.

In 1989, an FBI statement was filed in connection with a gambling investigation, identifying Todaro Sr. and his son, Todaro Jr., as the leaders of a Buffalo Mafia family consisting of 45 "made" members that was in control of various criminal activities, including labor racketeering, bookmaking, loansharking, and narcotics trafficking. The court statements also claimed that Joseph Todaro Jr. was running the Mafia family because his father, Todaro Sr., was in semi-retirement, splitting time between his Tonawanda and Florida homes. It was also stated that Leonard F. Falzone was running a local loansharking operation, while brothers Victor and Daniel Sansanese were controlling bookmaking for the Todaros. The FBI also had bugged Falzone's union-owned car in 1988 to link the Todaros to the illegal gambling case, but the device was unable to provided any evidence of such a link.

On September 6, 1993, Todaro Sr.'s grandson, Joseph Edward Todaro III (the son of Todaro Jr.), married Dana Christine Panepinto, the daughter of Donald Panepinto.

In 1996, Todaro Sr. and Todaro Jr. were listed among 24 alleged organized crime figures who were accused of influencing the Laborers International Union of North America since the 1960s.

In late 1996, Los Angeles crime family Underboss Carmen Milano reached out to Todaro Sr. about joining forces to take over a loansharking and auto insurance fraud racket in Las Vegas controlled by Herbert Blitzstein, a Chicago Outfit associate. Milano decided that Todaro Sr. would receive a piece of the Blitzstein rackets in Las Vegas. The two Mafia families arranged that Buffalo family soldier Robert Panaro would be the fence for Blitzstein's jewelry.

In 1999, Todaro Sr., Todaro Jr., and 16 others were named as defendants in a civil racketeering lawsuit for (allegedly) controlling the Laborers' International Union of North America Local 210 over a number of years through various racketeering acts. The complaint identified Todaro Sr. as boss and Todaro Jr. as underboss of the Buffalo family and the owners of La Nova Pizzeria. Todaro Sr. never belonged to Local 210 but Todaro Jr. served as Local 210's business manager until he resigned in 1990. The charges were based on the testimony of Ronald M. Fino, a former business manager of Local 210, who became an FBI informant.

In June 2004, Todaro Sr. was named as a “person of interest” in the unsolved 1965 murder of Charles S. Gerass, who had been shot and left in a car trunk, but the investigation did not lead to charges against Todaro Sr. (or anyone else). Todaro Sr. was named as a "person of interest" in Gerass's murder because Gerass disappeared after leaving his home for a business meeting with Todaro Sr. In 2006, Todaro Sr. retired and Todaro Jr. become boss, with Leonard Falzone acting under him until Falzone's death in 2016.

The FBI and the U.S. Justice Department have alleged several times that Todaro Sr. and Todaro Jr. were the leaders of Buffalo’s La Cosa Nostra family but were not able to obtain a conviction. Outside of his alleged connections to organized crime, Todaro Sr. operated La Nova Pizzeria in Buffalo. He founded La Nova Pizzeria in 1957, which grew from one small West Side restaurant to a multimillion-dollar business that sells frozen chicken wings, pizzas and hot sauces. In 2001, Todaro Sr. opened a second La Nova Pizzeria on Main Street in Amherst. Todaro Sr. loved smoking cigars and horse racing. He also enjoyed a friendship with Anthony Masiello, the former Buffalo city mayor.

Todaro Sr. died on December 26, 2012, at age 89, following a lengthy illness.
