= 2010 City Grill shooting =

Mass shooting in New York, U.S.

- City Grill Massacre
- Location: City Grill, Downtown Buffalo, New York
- Date: August 14, 2010; 2:30 AM (UTC−05:00)
- Attack type: Mass shooting
- Weapon: 9×19mm Parabellum handgun
- Deaths: 5 (Note: The original number was 4 dead, but one more died in 2017 after succumbing to his injuries leading the now-official number to be 5)
- Injuries: 3 (Note: The original number was 4 wounded, but one more died in 2017 after succumbing to his injuries leading the now-official number to be 3)
- Perpetrator: Riccardo McCray
- Motive: Possibly gang related
- Charges: Three counts of first degree murder Two counts of attempted murder Criminal possession of a weapon
- Verdict: Life without the possibility of parole

The 2010 City Grill shooting, also known colloquially as the City Grill Massacre was a mass shooting that occurred on August 14, 2010, at the City Grill restaurant in downtown Buffalo, New York, located on main street. With five people killed, it was the deadliest shooting in Buffalo before the Tops supermarket shooting 12 years later.

== Shooting ==
On the night of August 14, 2010, at approximately 2:30 AM, the shooter, 23-year-old Riccardo McCray, entered the building where a party was being hosted by one of the victims for their first wedding anniversary where he then shot off rounds and killed the victims execution-style. The shooting lasted under a minute with 10 shots being fired over the course of around 17 seconds. One of the victims was the bridegroom who was attending the party, McCray later fled the scene after around 100 guests of the party fled as well. There was no initial presumption of any intentions, including ideological, and was called a random killing at first. Though later sources show that there was a confrontation between McCray and rival gang members, due to this confrontation between the perpetrator and one of the victims, the management of the building told people to leave and attempted to shut down the building for the remainder of the night before the shooting occurred. After management failed to remove everyone from the building, McCray started firing shots and killed four people and injured another four during the attack. One of the injured was left in critical condition. Three of the victims were identified directly on the scene as 26-year-old Willie McCaa III, 27-year-old Shawn-Tia McNeil, and 32-year-old Tiffany Wilhite. The fourth victim was identified as 30-year-old Danyell Mackin. One of the victims later died in the hospital she was transferred to after the shooting.

== Aftermath ==
Due to the suspect fleeing, the Buffalo Police Department arrested 25-year-old Keith Johnson and charged him with 4 counts of second degree murder though the Buffalo police did not have evidence or could prove that Johnson had any association with the fight or any confrontation that happened prior to the shooting that occurred. Though, a day after the arrest, Erie County District Attorney Frank Sedita III alerted the judge on the case about new evidence, CCTV footage, that showed the physical appearance of the actual perpetrator including race, height, gender, and general physique in which led to the charges of Keith Johnson being dropped entirely. After Johnson was released with all charges dropped, a manhunt ensued looking for the true perpetrator which lasted for 10 days. Buffalo police also hypothesized that there was a second perpetrator to the attack. A fundraiser was created by the funeral homes of the victims which included the local Buffalo community and religious leaders that promised to divide the funds among the families victims if the perpetrator turned themself in, the reverend Darius Pridgen of the Buffalo True Bethel Baptist Church started the fundraiser with $4,000 during services in honor of the two victims, Shawnita McNeil and her 32-year-old cousin, Tiffany Wilhite, though, other pastors, business owners, and members of the community donated to the cause and led the fund to raise up to $20,000, which was promised to the victims families. Around 11 days after the shooting, the perpetrator turned himself in to the Buffalo police. After McCray turned himself in to the Buffalo police, he was placed under the custody of the Buffalo police until he was set to be put to trial which he would appear at court in October 2010 with the judge assigned to the case giving him a hearing in November 2010. In March, 2011, jury selection started in Buffalo with the case of McCray for both the trial of his first degree murder charges. A month later after jury selection in April 2011, the jury found Riccardo McCray guilty on three counts of first-degree murder, two counts of attempted murder and weapons possession. He would be sentenced to life imprisonment without the possibility of parole, though as he was sentenced, McCray continued to plead his innocence to the court and to the families that attended the trial. The attorneys of McCray stated that there were more than one shooters according to the CCTV footage, and McCray confirmed this by stating there will multiple shots from different people according to an interview done by WIVB-TV and McCray. Contrary to what the attorneys of McCray and McCray himself stated, eyewitnesses of the attack state that there was only one shooter and described him as a dark-complexioned African American at about 5 foot 7, matching the description of McCray. Around a month later, a relative to McCray, Ahmen R. Lester, was murdered by the Schuele Boys in Buffalo at the 1000 block of East Ferry street in retaliation for the shooting which led authorities to believe that there was gang motivation as the identities of McCray and the man he fist fought came out through CCTV footage were rival gang members with McCray being a member of the East Ferry gang and the man he fought being a member of the Schuele Boys. This revealed McCray's gang association, with his street name being "Murder Matt" or just simply "murder".

In 2014, a dispute over the reward money collected by Darius Pridgen and local community activist Darnell Jackson who assisted in the arrest of McCray led to Jackson suing Pridgen for, allegedly, leaving Jackson out of the collected money. During this time, McCray attempted to appeal his sentence and conviction while serving his life sentence at the Green Haven Correctional Facility, both of the appeals were denied by the court.

In 2015, victim Tanisha Mackin wrote a memoir and co-founded the Mackin Project, focused on supporting families impacted by violence.

In 2017, one of the injured victims of the shooting, 37-year-old Demario Vass, died from his injuries on October 17 after being shot in the head by McCray which left him paralyzed from the neck down and only able to communicate through blinking and grunting noises, he had assisted care from his family members including his mother where he spent most of his time in the hospital staring at the 72-inch television that was provided for him in which, most of the time, he would watch NFL games of the Buffalo Bills and NBA games.

Nearly 12 years after the grill shooting, a witness of the grill shooting, Latisha Rogers, whose brother had been killed in the grill shooting, was employed at the Tops Friendly Markets when the 2022 Buffalo shooting occurred, and survived the attack by hiding while calling 911.
