= Schuele Boys =

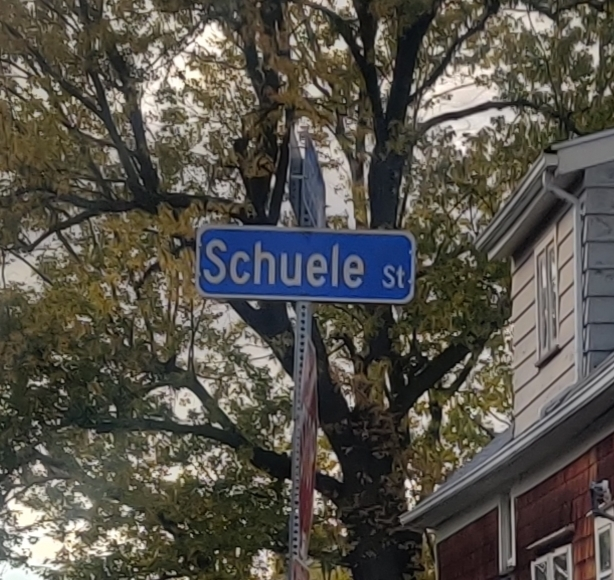
- Founded: 2000
- Named after: Schuele Street
- Founding location: Grider, Buffalo, New York
- Years active: 2000–present
- Ethnicity: Mainly African American
- Allies: Buffalo crime family
- Rivals: East Ferry Street Gang
- Notable members: Riccardo "Murder Matt" McCray

Schuele Boys is a street gang based in Buffalo, New York, specifically East Side, Buffalo, in the areas of Grider and outskirt of Genessee-Moselle.

== History ==
The gang established themselves in Grider, Buffalo, New York in 2000 and headquartered in the street of Schuele Avenue in which they would sell various narcotics including cocaine, crack cocaine and marijuana and spearhead acts of violence. Besides drug trafficking, the gang gains revenue through acts of violence and debt collecting. These acts include robbery, extortion, contract killing, arms trafficking, and selling stolen property. The gang sometimes bought narcotics, specifically cocaine in most cases, to repackage and resell after buying them from other gang members. The gang also participated in a number of drive-by shootings. During investigations by the Federal Bureau of Investigation, New York State Police, and Erie County Sheriff Deputies against the Schuele Boys which included listening in on gang members’ phone conversations, surveillance and undercover drug purchases, the conductors of the investigations had to stop what they were doing and make arrests before gang members could harm their rivals.

Members of the gang create rap music, some of it in the drill genre, which shows gang activity including the production of illegal narcotics under the Schuele Boys' record label "Gone Entertainment". In the music videos produced by the members, they show themselves in what is claimed as Schuele Boys territory including areas south of the Erie County Medical Center. Music videos and songs entitled "Front Door" and "Dinner Table" were used in the prosecution of some Schuele Boys members.

According to U.S. Attorney William J. Hochul Jr., members of the Schuele Boys were the target of the 2010 mass shooting outside the former City Grill restaurant in downtown Buffalo. Four people died directly after or during the shooting, a fifth victim died years later.

In 2017, 28 members of the Schuele Boys were arrested for narcotics distribution and homicides in Buffalo, in one of the member's residences, $19,000 in cash and 300 grams of cocaine were found and confiscated by the Buffalo Police Department.
