= Joseph Todaro Jr. =

American mobster

Joseph A. "Big Joe" Todaro Jr. (born 1945 or 1946) is an American businessman and the son of Joseph Todaro Sr. Todaro is best known as the owner of La Nova Pizzeria, a popular pizzeria chain in Buffalo, New York and the Western New York region that was founded by his father. Both Todaro Sr. and Todaro Jr. have been accused of holding regional leadership roles in the American Mafia, charges that Todaro Jr. has denied.

In 2017, Canadian court proceedings alleged that Todaro Jr. is the current boss of the Buffalo crime family, a position previously held by his father Todaro Sr.

== Biography ==
Joseph A. Todaro Jr. was born to Joseph Todaro Sr. and Josephine Santamauro. He later married Carol Ann "Cookie" and had two children Joseph E. Todaro and Carla (she later married Salvatore Pantano).

Joseph "Big Joe" Todaro Jr. became a business agent for the Laborers' International Union of North America (LIUNA) Local 210. In May 1967, days before Todaro Jr. was going to marry Carol A. Panaro Buffalo law enforcement agents arrested him, along with his father and 34 other men at wedding stage party.

In 1970, Todaro Jr., along with his father and three others were charged by the FBI for running illegal gambling games of dice and card in mid-air flights on rented jets to Las Vegas but the gambling case ended with no convictions.

Todaro Jr. was accused of being involved in an unsuccessful plot to murder Faust Novino in 1976. Allegedly, the ambush was set up by Novino's long-time associate and friend Louis Pisa who approached him about committing a burglary at a warehouse at 463 Connecticut Street on Buffalo's west side. Novino testified that he believed that he and Pisa were alone when he noticed a heavyset man, whom he identified as John Sacco, raising his arm to hit him. At that moment he drew his .45 and shot Sacco. Then, hearing footsteps behind him, he turned and shot at a man he identified as Leonard Falzone. Novino said that he then saw two men, Todaro Jr. and Frank Billiteri, crouched on the floor on either side of him. Feeling boxed in, he shot once at Falzone, and again at Sacco who was allegedly still coming at him. He then turned, ran into Falzone, and fired the weapon into his chest, but it jammed. Finally, after hiding behind a rolled-up rug, he was able to escape out a door leading to 17th Street.

In 1984, Todaro Jr. allegedly became the underboss of the Buffalo crime family when his father became the new head of the crime family upon the retirement of his predecessor Samuel "Sam the Farmer" Frangiamore.

In 1989, an FBI statement was filed in connection with a gambling investigation and identified Todaro Sr. and his son Todaro Jr. as the leaders of a 45 "made" member Buffalo Mafia family and were in control of various criminal activities that included labor racketeering, bookmaking, loansharking and narcotics trafficking. The court statements also claimed that Joseph Todaro Jr. was running the Mafia family because his father Todaro Sr. was in semi-retirement splitting time between his Tonawanda and Florida homes. It was also stated that Leonard F. Falzone was running a local loansharking operation and brothers Victor and Daniel Sansanese were controlling bookmaking for the Todaro's. The FBI had also bugged Falzone's union-owned car in 1988, to link the Todaro's in the illegal gambling case but the device was unable to provide any evidence linking the Todaro's.

In 1990, Todaro Jr. resigned as business agent of LIUNA following investigations into the local union's alleged ties to organized crime.

On September 6, 1993, his son Joseph Edward Todaro III married Dana Christine Panepinto, the daughter of Donald Panepinto.

In 1996 Todaro Sr. and his son Todaro Jr. were listed among 24 alleged organized crime figures who were accused of influencing the Laborers International Union of North America since the 1960s.

In 1999, Joseph Todaro Jr. along with his father Joseph Todaro Sr. and 16 others were named in a civil racketeering lawsuit for controlling local 210 through the years by various racketeering acts. The court complaint identified Joseph A. Todaro Jr. as underboss and his father Joseph E. Todaro Sr. as boss of the Buffalo family and the owners of La Nova Pizzeria. Todaro Jr. served as Local 210 business manager in 1990 before resigning. Todaro Jr. attempted to keep control of Local 210 with the help of Peter Gerace and Peter Capitano, both of whom already held positions in the Local. The charges were based on the testimony of Ronald M. Fino, a former business manager of Local 210 before he became an FBI informant.

In 2006, Todaro Sr. retired, and Todaro Jr. become boss, with Leonard F. "Lennie Calzone" Falzone acting under him. His father Todaro Sr. died on December 26, 2012, at age 89 following a lengthy illness. In 2016, Falzone died. Outside of organized crime, Todaro Jr. operates La Nova Pizzeria in Buffalo; Todaro III operates a chicken wing spin-off under the La Nova brand.

According to the U.S. Department of Justice, in 1995, Todaro Jr. assumed the day-to-day running of the Buffalo family from his father, Joseph Todaro Sr., becoming acting boss of the crime family. Until Domenico Violi's trial in 2018 in Hamilton, Ontario, it was believed that Todaro Jr. had stepped down from active participation in the Buffalo Mafia in 2006 and that Leonard Falzone (who died in 2016) had taken over as boss. Ron Fino indicated that he believed that Falzone was acting as the front boss for the Todaros. Wiretaps recorded from 2015 to 2017 also indicated Domenico Violi of the Luppino crime family, was made the underboss of the Buffalo crime family by boss Todaro Jr. in October 2017 in a meeting in Florida; the first Canadian to hold the second-highest position in the American Mafia. The wiretaps also revealed the activity of The Commission (the governing body of the American Mafia) as Violi's promotion was so unusual that Todaro Jr. consulted with The Commission for permission to promote Violi as the Buffalo family's new underboss. Homeland Security Investigations Agent Curtis Ryan indicated Todaro is the current boss of the Buffalo LCN family court papers related to his nephew, Peter Gerace Jr.'s, alleged bribing of DEA agent Joseph Bongiovanni. The Buffalo News speculated that La Nova Pizzeria's growing popularity had prompted the Todaros to lower their profile to avoid scrutiny over the family's ties to the Mafia.

In a January 2023 interview, Todaro denied that he held a leadership role in organized crime.
