= Herbert Blitzstein =

American organized crime figure (1934–1997)

- Born: November 2, 1934; Chicago, Illinois, U.S.
- Died: January 6, 1997 (aged 62); Las Vegas, Nevada, U.S.
- Other name: Fat Herbie
- Occupations: Gangster; bootlegger; racketeer
- Criminal charges: Fraud, conspiracy
- Penalty: 8-year sentence at Federal Center Institution, El Reno, Oklahoma

Herbert "Fat Herbie" Blitzstein (November 2, 1934 – January 6, 1997) was an American mobster who was a loanshark, bookmaker, racketeer and lieutenant to Tony "The Ant" Spilotro and the Chicago Outfit in Las Vegas, Nevada.

== Biography ==
Born in a Jewish family in Chicago, Blitzstein started working the rackets in the late 1950s. Standing six feet tall and weighing three hundred pounds, he sported a goatee and moustache, dressed flamboyantly, and drove a 1973 Cadillac Eldorado. It was said he had a close physical resemblance to the Italian opera singer Luciano Pavarotti. Blitzstein lived at 6720 North Damen Avenue in Rogers Park, Chicago, with his third wife, but spent a great deal of time at Phil Alderisio's bar, The Tradewinds in The Patch. He had been a close associate of convicted mob bookmaker Henry Kushner. When Kushner was convicted of bookmaking by the FBI and sent to prison, Blitzstein took over his clientele along with mob bookmaker Boodie Cowan, who was later murdered, probably by Anthony Spilotro.

While in Chicago, he served as an enforcer for Leonard Patrick. Blitzstein was later convicted of racketeering. When he was released from prison, he moved to Las Vegas to serve as muscle for Tony Spilotro. Spilotro, his brother, John, and Blitzstein ran the Gold Rush Ltd. jewelry store, located on West Sahara Avenue, which was a front for the Hole in the Wall Gang, so named because they punched holes through walls and ceilings to grab loot and run. Blitzstein also worked as a fence for stolen goods at the combination jewelry store and electronics factory.

== The Hole in the Wall Gang ==
His capo, Anthony Spilotro, in 1976, formed a burglary ring with his brother Michael and Blitzstein, utilizing about eight associates as burglars. The crew became known as the Hole in the Wall Gang because of its penchant for gaining entry by drilling through the exterior walls and ceilings of the buildings they burglarized. Other gang members included Peanuts Pancsko, Butch Pancsko and Pops Pancsko, Frank DeLegge, Michael LaJoy, Joseph D'Argento, Gerald Tomasczek, Peter Basile of Wilmette, Illinois, Carl Urbanotti of Chicago, Illinois, Ernest Lehnigg of Addison, Illinois, Samuel Cusumano, Joseph Cusumano, Ernesto "Ernie" Davino of Las Vegas, "Crazy Larry" Neumann, Wayne Matecki, Salvatore "Sonny" Romano, Leonardo "Leo" Guardino of Las Vegas, Frank Cullotta of Las Vegas and former Las Vegas detective, Joseph Blasko of Las Vegas, who acted as a lookout and who later worked as a bartender at the Crazy Horse Too, a gentleman's club, and died of a heart attack in 2002. Following the botched burglary at Bertha's Gifts & Home Furnishings on July 4, 1981, Cullotta, Blasko, Guardino, Davino, Neumann and Matecki were arrested and each charged with burglary, conspiracy to commit burglary, attempted grand larceny and possession of burglary tools. They were locked into the Las Vegas police department's holding cell in downtown Las Vegas. The only members of Spilotro's gang not arrested for the July 4th burglary were Blitzstein, Michael Spilotro, Romano and Cusumano. By this time, Spilotro's relationship with Frank Rosenthal had ended since Spilotro had slept with Rosenthal's wife, Geraldine McGee. Meanwhile, Cullotta had turned state's witness, testifying against Spilotro. But the testimony was insufficient and Spilotro was acquitted.

In 1967, according to FBI affidavits, Blitzstein ordered the murder of associate loan shark and bookmaker Arthur "Boodie" Cowan for holding back a street tax. Although Blitzstein did not participate in the July 4 robbery, he was indicted with Tony Spilotro on federal racketeering charges. The charges were later dropped due to insufficient evidence.

In 1976, Blitzstein was convicted of running an illegal gambling operation.

He was one of the few Hole in the Wall Gang members who was not arrested after a botched July 4 burglary at Bertha's Home Furnishings in 1981. Blitzstein is described by FBI agent William Roemer in his book The Enforcer as one of the mobsters tested by the FBI in the early days of the Top Hoodlum Program.

In 1987, Blitzstein was convicted on federal charges, including credit card fraud, conspiracy and receiving stolen property. He was sentenced to eight years in prison.

While incarcerated in California, Blitzstein was taken off his heart medication by a prison medic and suffered a heart attack as a result. His case was part of a 1991 congressional investigation into medical abuse in prisons.

On December 10, 1991, Blitzstein was unanimously nominated by the Nevada Gaming Control Board for inclusion in its official Black Book. Former police officer and board member Steve DuCharme said that Blitzstein's life "reads like a crime novel," and that Blitzstein was responsible for some of the most "embarrassing" crimes in Las Vegas city history. Nevada Deputy District Attorney Charlotte Matanane called Blitzstein a "notorious and unsavory person" during the relevant board hearing and accused him of associating with Frank Rosenthal, among others.

== Death ==
On January 6, 1997, Blitzstein was found dead in his Las Vegas home from a small caliber gunshot to the base of his skull, and some suspected that his death was an organized crime hit.

It was later revealed that in late 1996, the Los Angeles crime family along with the Buffalo crime family joined forces to take over a loan sharking and auto insurance fraud racket in Las Vegas controlled by Blitzstein. The L.A. Underboss Carmen Milano along with L.A. soldiers Stephen Cino and Louis Caruso and L.A associates Johnny Branco and Peter Caruso originally planned to rob and steal Blitzstein's jewelry. After stealing Blitzstein's jewelry the group planned to use Buffalo family soldier Robert Panaro as the fence. It was decided by Milano that Buffalo family boss Joseph Todaro Sr. would receive a piece of the Blitzstein rackets in Las Vegas. The job of robbing Blitzstein was given to Peter Caruso but Caruso changed the plan and decided to murder Blitzstein instead and take over his Las Vegas operations. Caruso hired L.A. associate Alfred Mauriello who in turn hired associates Antonio Davi and Richard Friedman to be the hitmen in the murder. Then Caruso arranged with Joe DeLuca who was one of Blitzstein's partners in an auto repair shop to get them access into Blitzstein's home. On January 6, 1997 Antonio Davi and Richard Friedman shot and killed Blitzstein in his own home. During the trial it was revealed that L.A. associate John Branco had been wearing a wire for the FBI and helped two FBI agents infiltrate Milano's Las Vegas crew. Of the seven people arrested in the plot to kill Blitzstein, four pleaded guilty to lesser charges in order to receive reduced sentences. One died in prison awaiting trial and two went to trial and were acquitted.

== In popular culture ==
Blitzstein, portrayed in the film Casino by Bret McCormick as Bernie Blue, was not murdered by the Las Vegas police during a bungled arrest as portrayed in the film. The shooting depicted in Casino was that of another reputed associate of Anthony Spilotro named Frank Bluestein, not Blitzstein.

Details of Blitzstein's murder, written by Cathy Scott, were included in the 2012 book Masters of True Crime: Chilling Stories of Murder and the Macabre, an anthology of crime stories.

He was played by Gregg Merrill in the 2008 TV-Movie Sex and Lies in Sin City. In a scene based on real events, he helps Rick Tabish (best known for being a suspect in the Ted Binion silver murder) beat up someone with a phone book.
