= Carmen Milano =

American lawyer and mafia members

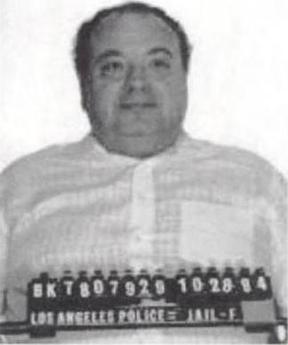
- L.A.P.D. mug shot of Milano in 1984
- Born: July 27, 1929; Cleveland, Ohio, US
- Died: January 3, 2006 (aged 76); Las Vegas, Nevada, US
- Other name: Flipper
- Known for: Mob Activity
- Spouse: Geraldine Giesler
- Parent: Anthony Milano (father)
- Relatives: Frank Milano (uncle); Peter Milano (brother)

Carmen Joseph Milano (July 27, 1929 - January 3, 2006) was an American lawyer who eventually became a member of the American Mafia, serving as underboss of the Los Angeles crime family. The criminal organization he served was headed by his older brother Peter Milano. His nickname was "Flipper", after the TV dolphin.

== Biography ==
=== Early life ===
Carmen Milano was born in Cleveland, Ohio in 1929 to Anthony and Josephine Milano (née DiSanto). His family was of Calabrian origin and he had three brothers, John, Frank, and Peter. His father was Mafioso Anthony Milano, who was underboss of the Cleveland crime family from 1930 until his retirement in 1976. His uncle, Frank Milano was boss of the Cleveland family and sat on the original Commission from 1930 until 1935, when he fled the country to avoid charges for tax evasion. Carmen moved with his mother and siblings to Beverly Hills, California when he was a teenager after his mother developed cancer. His father, who had rackets and business interests in both Ohio and California, split time between the two states. When the brothers graduated high school, Peter decided to stay in Los Angeles and work with Jewish gangster Mickey Cohen.

Carmen decided to attend Loyola Marymount University in Los Angeles and after graduating was accepted to Loyola Law School. During his attendance, he was a member of the Phi Delta Phi fraternity. While in law school, he became engaged to Geraldine Giesler, the daughter of prominent criminal defense lawyer Jerry Giesler. On January 5, 1955, Milano was admitted to the State Bar of California. Afterwards, Milano moved back to Cleveland to pursue a career as an attorney. Mafia associate and burglar Phil Christopher described parties Milano would host at the Italian American Brotherhood Club in Little Italy, Cleveland in the late 1970s. The club was owned by Carmen's father and were attended by mobsters, businessman, and politicians alike. During the 1970s, Milano was paid a retainer for few, if any, legal services to Teamsters Local 410 and 436, which are labor unions that were allegedly controlled by Milano's father. Milano eventually was disbarred from practicing law in an incident involving fraudulent workers' compensation claims.

=== Underboss ===
In 1984, Milano decided to move back to California where his older brother was now running the Los Angeles crime family. He initially resided with Los Angeles crime family caporegime (Captain) Luigi "Louie" Gelfuso, before owning and maintaining his own residence in the Tarzana district of Los Angeles. In 1984, Peter Milano became the official boss of the L.A. family and shortly after, Carmen became a made man and became his underboss. Carmen's primary role was to insulate Peter from the lower ranking members of the family, thereby protecting Peter from law enforcement scrutiny. Carmen Milano also had mob connections in Cleveland and in the East Coast, which included New York bosses Anthony "Tony Ducks" Corallo and Anthony Salerno. Kenny Gallo described him as the tougher of the two brothers.

L.A. mobster turned government witness Anthony Fiato once described Milano after their first encounter:

I thought he was a fucking hobo. His shirt's open, he has a big potbelly, scuffed shoes. He tells me to call him Flipper, like the dolphin. My first impression of this guy was that he was a down-at-the-heels hobo, more so than some high-level Mafia member. He was more of an albatross than a dolphin. But he was tougher than he looked. He had a reputation and wasn't afraid to mix it up.

Milano was among 20 reputed organized crime figures arrested in 1984, in what law enforcement officials said was a bid to take over a $1 million-a-week bookmaking operation in Los Angeles. Neither of the Milano brothers (nor six of the others originally arrested) were charged due to lack of evidence.

On May 21, 1987, the entire hierarchy of the L.A. family was indicted for violating the R.I.C.O. Act after a 2-year investigation by the F.B.I. On March 29, 1988, Milano pleaded guilty to conspiring to extort money out of loan shark victims who had unpaid debts. In exchange for the plea, he received a six-month prison sentence and 3 years probation, but never admitted to being a part of the Mafia. While his brother received jail time, Carmen Milano ran the family as acting boss, taking care of the depleted business until his brother was released in 1991.

=== Las Vegas ===
In the early 1990s, Milano moved to Las Vegas, Nevada and was in control of the L.A. family's interests in the city. In 1998 Milano was one of several people named in a series of indictments that stemmed from a two-year investigation of organized crime in Southern Nevada. Milano admitted developing a fraudulent diamond scheme in the winter of 1996 with Herbert Blitzstein that was never carried out and laundering $50,000 from a food stamp fraud. In 2000, he was sentenced to 21 months in prison by federal judge Philip Martin Pro. During the investigation Milano admitted to being the underboss of the L.A. family and that his brother was boss. This violated the Mafia's oath of Omertà. He considered becoming a government witness, but changed his mind. Despite this Peter Milano sought no reprisals for his brother's betrayal, who continued to remain underboss when released from prison.

During the investigation, former FBI agent Bob Hammer was quoted as saying:

If you were making a movie, you would almost cast George Costanza as the underboss. I'm not trying to minimize the impact of the family, but he was the gentleman underboss. He was probably one of the last guys you'd pick out of a lineup and identify as the underboss.

Hammer, however, was also impressed by his manners and intelligence:

He was extremely personable. I believe Carmen was somewhat ahead of his time. He grew up in a society where the mob kids became mob guys, and he became a lawyer even though he was disbarred.

Milano was released from prison on February 27, 2002. Milano died January 3, 2006, at Spring Valley Hospital of cardiac arrest and renal failure.

== Notes ==
Business positions
Preceded by Samuel Sciortino	Los Angeles crime family underboss 1984-2006	Succeeded by Tommaso Gambino
