= Ontario Biker War =

War in Ontario between the Outlaws and the Hells Angels

- Date: 1999–2002
- Location: Ontario, Canada
- Caused by: Narcotics trade, territorial and criminal disputes
- Result: Hells Angels victory due to police crackdown

Parties
Hells Angels MC: Jackels MC; Support: Hells Angels Sherbrooke chapter	Outlaws MC Support: Bandidos MC; Rock Machine MC (until 2001)	Loners MC: Annihilators Motorcycle Club; Support: Rock Machine MC (until 2001)

Lead figures
Walter Stadnick; Paul Porter (after 2000); John Coates; Jimmy Coates	Mario Parente; Thomas Hughes	Gennaro Raso; Peter Barilla; Wayne Kellestine

Casualties
- Deaths: 3+
- Injuries: 30+
- Arrested: 80+

The Ontario Biker War in Canada saw the Hells Angels engage their long-term rivals the Outlaws Motorcycle Club for control of the province of Ontario. The war occurred between 1999 and 2002 and is also known as the London Biker conflict as a large majority of the events occurred in the city of London, Ontario. The Quebec Biker War, the largest motorcycle conflict in history was occurring during the same period in the province of Quebec.

== Prelude to conflict ==
From 1977 to 1984, the event known in Canada as the First Biker War was raging in Quebec and Ontario. On 17 July 1983, while riding through northern Ontario, Mario Parente happened to see two Hells Angels from Montreal, Michel "Jinx" Genest and Jean-Marc Nadeau, on the bus to Vancouver to attend a "patching over" ceremony to witness the Satan's Angels gang join the Hells Angels. Enraged, Parente and the other Outlaws proceeded to shoot up the bus when it stopped at the Greyhound bus station in Wawa in an attempt to kill the two Hells Angels. Though no one was killed, the Wawa incident showed how strongly Parente felt about Hells Angels moving into Ontario, which had been considered Outlaws territory since 1977.

London, Ontario was described by the journalist Jerry Langton as "very much an Outlaws town". The London chapter of the Outlaws was the second most important chapter after the Hamilton chapter, as London was a "very rich territory for drug sales". In addition, London was sited in the middle of the "meth ally" that connected the methamphetamine manufacturers in the rural areas with the 401 highway running to Toronto and in the other direction to the American Midwest, an area dominated by the Outlaws. As such, London is considered to be "very desirable for biker gangs".

During the 1990s, Hells Angels from Quebec would frequently visit the Ontario-based Loners Motorcycle Club. In June 1993, the Hells Angels, led by their National President Walter Stadnick, hosted a party in Wasaga Beach that was attended by all of the Ontario biker clubs except the Outlaws and Satan's Choice. Frank Lenti and the Loners were guests of honor at the party. Stadnick tried to persuade Lenti to have the Loners "patch over" to the Hells Angels, an offer that Lenti refused. However, a working relationship was established after the Loners agreed to buy their narcotics from the Angels.

On April 7, 1998, Jeffrey Labrash, acting President of the Outlaws London chapter, and fellow Full-Patch Outlaw Jody Hart, were victims of a shooting in the parking lot of the Beef Baron, a strip club on York Street in London, Ontario. On the same day as the funerals for Labrash and Hart, T. J. Baxter's Tap & Grill, a popular restaurant in London, was bombed, injuring five and causing an estimated $1,000,000 in damages. Two associates of the Hell's Angels were arrested and charged for the shootings. The Outlaws placed a $50,000 bounty on both.

== 1999 ==
In 1999, the Hells Angels became seriously involved in trying to patch over the Loners Motorcycle Club which had been a major club in the province for decades. In June 1999, the Annihilators Motorcycle Club was "Patched-over" by the Loners. One of the members of the London/Chatham chapter of the Loners, Jimmy Coates, had a brother, John Coates, who was a member of the Hells Angels Sherbrooke chapter. John Coates was 6'7" tall, weighing 300 pounds his while younger brother Jimmy was not as large, but still intimidating. Through his brother, Jimmy Coates opened a secret pipeline for buying narcotics from the Sherbrooke chapter.

The President of the London/Chatham chapter, Wayne Kellestine, was adamantly against having the Loners join the Hells Angels, and when the Loners did not agree with him started meeting in secret with the Hells Angels Sherbrooke chapter, Kellestine stripped them of their colours. One Loner was also stuck with a pistol and robbed for making further comments. Together, the Coates brothers worked to encourage a mutiny against Kellestine with the promise of joining the Angels as the reward. On 22 October 1999, an assassination attempt was made against Kellestine as he stopped in his truck for a red light in his hometown of Iona Station. A car drove up alongside Kellestine's truck driven by Philippe "Philbilly" Gastonguay of the Angels' Sherbrooke chapter, and a pro-Angel Loner, David "Dirty" McLeish. One of the two men opened fire, spraying Kellestine's truck with bullets. Both men would be arrested and Kellestine would survive unharmed. The two shooters and both Coates brothers were charged with "conspiracy to commit murder". They would plead guilty to "conspiracy to commit bodily harm", and were jailed. When the brothers got out, they would be running the club's Hells Angels London chapter.

The Hells Angels were intent on gaining influence in Southern Ontario especially. In other areas of Ontario, clubs had been quite welcoming of the Angels; but here they faced stiff resistance, their main opposition being their old time rival the Outlaws Motorcycle Club (at the time, the largest motorcycle club in the province). As the club's Quebec chapters planned their expansion Eastward in late 1999, London was solidly in Outlaws control and had been since the late 1970s, but in establishing a chapter here, it would create a vital link between Windsor and Kitchener. The Outlaws London chapter clubhouse was located on Egerton Street East, near the grounds of the Western Fair, was considered a local landmark by the people of the city. Their President, Mario Parente, was an individual who could not be intimidated. By the end of 1999, the Hells Angels Ontario Nomad chapter and the Outlaws began to engage each other in both London and Hamilton, with several brawls and scuffles occurring between the clubs. A Biker Enforcement Unit representative stated:

"They used to drive by and taunt each other, For the H.A., their priority is to absorb other gangs and gain territorial control. In order to do that, they either have to befriend or fight their rivals."

== 2000 ==
The Quebec Biker War began in 1994 and saw the Hells Angels face the Canadian-based Rock Machine for control of the narcotics trade in the province. By 2000, the war had intensified. The Rock Machine began expanding into Ontario with three chapters (Toronto, Kingston and Niagara Falls). Not wanting to fall behind the Hells Angels, it established its first Ontario chapter in Toronto in the summer of 2000. That same summer, Stadnick gave a limited time offer to Outlaw motorcycle clubs in Ontario (especially Satan's Choice and Para-dice Riders) to join the Hells Angels on a "patch-for-patch" basis, receiving Hells Angels patches that would be the equivalent of their current patches. There would be no probationary period for Hells Angels club membership, and all members would receive Full-Patch. This resulted in 168 members of the Para-dice Riders, Satan's Choice, Lobos and the Last Chance "patching" to the Angels.

Even members of the Rock Machine and Outlaws went over to the Hells Angels. Paul "Sasquatch" Porter, a founding member of the Rock Machine and the president of their Kingston chapter, wrote on the wall of the clubhouse: "Hello to all the RMMC, I wish you the best with your new colors! Bye my brothers!" Porter became the president of the Hells Angels Ottawa chapter. A number of Outlaws also chose to defect such as David "the Hammer" MacDonald of the Hamilton chapter and Shaun "Cheecks" Boshaw of the London chapter.Parente called James Wheeler, the President of the American Outlaws, who in turn contacted Sonny Barger, the leader of the American Hells Angels. Barger ordered Stadnick to stop trying to recruit Outlaws in exchange for a promise that there would be no biker war in Ontario.

Overnight, the Hells Angels went from no chapter in Ontario to 13, giving them a massive increase in both manpower and area of operation. Throughout 2000, brawls were common between the two groups across the province, with multiple injuries on both sides.

== The conflict escalates ==
By early 2001, the Hells Angels had established a prospective chapter in London, Ontario. They began investing in businesses within the city, this would include strip clubs, tattoo shops and a half-dozen exotic-massage parlors, referred to as "rub 'n' tugs" by many in London. They were also involved in the automotive trade, but most specifically in the city's narcotics market. In addition to their own businesses, the Hells Angels allegedly supplied a group of up to 30 street gang members to cook cocaine powder into crack, and peddle it on London street corners, sources claim. A Hells Angels clubhouse was opened at 732 York Street, just up the road from the Outlaws main clubhouse, which had around to eight to ten "full-patch" members. The reason for the location seemed to be a deliberate provocation. During this period, both Coates brothers and their friends were released from prison. John Coates would become President of the London probationary chapter, and Jimmy would begin prospecting. On 28 March 2001, the police launched Operation Printempts (Springtime) against the Hells Angels and Stadnick was arrested. The journalist Jerry Langton wrote that "without the diplomatic Stadnick to stand in their way", the Coates brothers behaved in an ultra-aggressive fashion, seeking to drive the Outlaws out of London. The London Hells Angels chapter were reported to have issued an ultimatum to the London Outlaw chapter to the effect of "give up your patch or die".

On 12 April 2001, the Hells Angels promptly informed the Loners that they did not have the right to use "Ontario" on their patch, as the Loners were only a "regional" club. Unable to stand on their own, the Chatham/London Loners joined the Bandidos on 22 May 2001, as probationary members becoming full members on 1 December 2001. The Angels also began aggressively attempting to recruit Outlaws to the London chapter. The London chapter of the Outlaws countered this by putting restrictions and intense pressure on members not to defect, sometimes with the threat of violence. Some Outlaws did switch sides and suffered violent retaliation. More exchanges occurred during this period after three Outlaws in London defected to Hell's Angels, exchanges saw at least 15 people injured in 2001.

In June 2001, the Outlaws' Woodstock chapter clubhouse was burnt to the ground in an act of arson. The Hells Angels were suspected to be involved. A week later, an Outlaw was arrested just outside of the Angels' clubhouse at 732 York Street. In August of the same year, a member of the Outlaws was pulled over by police en route to the York Street clubhouse of the Hells Angels, and authorities confiscated body armor, various firearms, and a pipe bomb.

In July 2001, three members of the Hells Angels were charged with extortion when they attempted to get a $70,000 payment from a business owner. The three men pled guilty to lesser charges. In December 2001, the Hells Angels patched over a dozen more Outlaws in Ontario. Other Outlaws were faced with an ultimatum: switch sides or retire.

== The London shooting ==
On January 7, 2002, the trial for the three Hells Angels members facing extortion began. On the same day, the tensions between the two groups in the city would escalate again, culminating in an exchange in gunfire that night between Hells Angels support clubs and Outlaws at 434 Egerton Street, close to the Outlaws clubhouse. On the night of 7 January 2002, members of the Jackals, a Hells Angels puppet club, showed up outside of the house of Thomas Hughes, the president of the Outlaws' London chapter, on Egerton Street near the Outlaws clubhouse. The Jackals demanded that Marcus Cornelisse, an Outlaw, come out of Hughes's house to talk to them. Instead, Hughes and Cornelisse came out and open fire, leading to a shoot-out that saw one Jackal, Eric Davignon, shot in the stomach. Though a number of shots were exchanged, neither side could aim very well and Davingon was the only person hit. The shoot-out ended with the Jackals fleeing in their car as Hughes and Cornelisse ran after them, shooting wildly into the dark.

Hughes was charged with four counts of attempted murder. He also incurred 23 additional charges relating to firearms, ammunition, this included semi-auto rifles and explosives in his residence. Eventually the attempted-murder charges were dropped as self defense, he was sentenced to only 30 months incarceration.

By now, London City council and London Police Service were under intense pressure by the public to do something about the situation. Then in late January 2002, tensions in the conflict reached their height. Outlaws from locations all over Canada began to travel to London to assist the London chapter, along with some American Bandidos and other rivals of the Angels. The 2002 London Motorcycle Show, organized at London's the Western Fair District, was promoted by the Hells Angels, who had run London's annual motorcycle-trade show for the last two years in a row. It was one of the "top five events of its kind in Canada." This venue would be the target of retaliation by the Outlaws and Bandidos. Larry Pooler, a Toronto Hells Angles told The London Free Press there was no danger of violence, saying that the Quebec Biker War was due to what he called the violent nature of French-Canadian society as he stated: "Their whole society is corrupt and vicious and violent. It always has been, since the 1600s-that' nothing new".

== The 2002 London Motorcycle Show ==
In February 2002, the expo was on a Saturday and was open to the public. Larry Pooler, a Toronto Hells Angel told The London Free Press that there was no danger of violence, saying that the Quebec Biker War was due to what he called the violent nature of French-Canadian society as he stated: "Their whole society is corrupt and vicious and violent. It always has been, since the 1600s-that' nothing new...If I was black or wore a turban, my pockets would be lined with gold from civil suits. But I'm just poor white-trash biker".

Around mid-afternoon, 120 Outlaws and Bandidos arrived at the Western Fair district in London. On the other side were 110 Hells Angels and their support club, the Jackals. Some of the Outlaws arriving wore body armour while others brandished large knives on their belts. The Bandidos, who had traveled up the Highway 401 from Toronto or from Detroit, arrived in a large group. They made a public display of respect for the Outlaws, then positioned themselves with their allies. The Bandidos were led by Giovanni Muscedere, the Outlaws by their national president Mario Parente, and the Hells Angels by the Ottawa chapter president Paul Porter. Muscedere hugged Parente as a sign of support, and then went about insulting the Hells Angels with much enthusiasm. The Bandidos and the Outlaws found themselves surrounded on three sides by Hells Angels and their support clubs. Surprised spectators fled to safe distances. Before hostilities could begin, a team of over 40 police officers from the London Police Service intervened and physically separated the two groups, demanding that the Bandidos, especially members of international status to depart. Police Chief Murray Faulkner said:

"If the police weren't there, we were in for trouble. Big-time. I was guessing a multiple shooting or stabbing."

Either way, the Western Fair committee barred the Hells Angels who organized the event from future use of the venue. London's then-mayor Anne Marie De Cicco was successful in her attempts to ban the London Motorcycle Show from the city as long as was directed by the Hells Angels. De Cicco banned Pooler's group, 2-4 the Show Productions, from the London Fairgrounds permanently.

== The Kingston shooting ==
On March 10, 2002, near Kingston, the OPP pulled over for speeding on the 401 highway a car carrying Daniel Lamer and Marc Bouffard, both of whom were members of the Rockers, the Hells Angels' puppet club in Montreal. Lamer opened fire on OPP constable Dan Brisson, who returned fire, killing him. Found inside the car were four handguns, a silencer and pictures of Alain "Red Tomato" Brunette, the national president of the Bandidos, together with various other Ontario Bandidos, which suggested the two Rockers from Montreal had been sent to kill them.

== The war ends ==
The Coates brothers' attempts to replicate the brutality of the Quebec club brought unnecessary complications. That did not sit well with the club's leadership who quickly realized that these actions were damaging for the club business and image. In early July 2002, London chapter President John Coates and his Hells Angels sponsor, Georges "Bo-Boy" Beaulieu of the Sherbrooke chapter, attended a meeting with Gerald Ward, head of the Niagara chapter, and William Miller, President of the North Toronto chapter. Coates was told "you're done" as far as the city of London was concerned. The Coates brothers and some of their associates were transferred to the Niagara Falls chapter under Ward's supervision. The London chapter was temporarily put under direct administration by the Toronto North chapter, led by Miller. A relatively peaceful period would follow these events, at least to the public eye. With the recent pressure, the unfinished conflict with the Outlaws went on hiatus and it would never end up resuming. Police had started infiltrating the Outlaws MC in 1999, at that time they were the largest motorcycle club in the province.

Ontario's Biker Enforcement Unit inadvertently delivered victory to the Hells Angels Motorcycle Club when raids launched in the early morning of September 25, 2002, crippled Outlaws operations in 11 of Ontario municipalities. The Ontario Provincial Police had launched Operation Retire, a concurrent investigation with Operation Amigo and Operation Summertime, targeting the Bandidos (operation was originally created for the Rock Machine until they merged into the Bandidos in 2001) and Hells Angels in Canada. Project Retire was intended to cripple the Outlaws Motorcycle Club in Ontario. The Police seized six stolen vehicles, 44 firearms, narcotics worth about $1.6 million, and five properties owned by the Outlaws. The operation resulted in all 58 full-patch Outlaws in Ontario being arrested including all of the Ontario-based leadership. Besides Parente, those arrested included former national president Andrew "Teach" Simmons of the Kingston chapter for attempted murder; Thomas Hughes, the president of the London chapter for attempted murder; Cornelisse for attempted murder;, and Thomas Roger Harmsworth of London, who had been shot by Kellestine in 1991 and refused to name him as the shooter. The Outlaws club has never been able to fully recover. As a result, since late 2002, the Hells Angels, despite periodic run-ins with authorities, controlled London's motorcycle scene, and had begun solidifying their hold on the province, a hold they have maintained ever since.

== Continued tensions and incidents ==
=== London Conflict ===
In early 2012, tensions between the two groups erupted again in London, Ontario. After years of remaining out of the headlines for the most part, the city's street gangs began to gain notoriety in the 2010s when a war broke out between the London chapter of the Hells Angels MC and the FU Crew, a local street gang backed by the London chapter of the Outlaws Motorcycle Club. This resulted in the deaths of several individuals, and the arson of several biker and gang-owned businesses and vehicles, with some of the bikers fleeing town temporarily.

The dispute first flared up when a tattoo parlor associated with the Outlaws motorcycle club was set ablaze on the morning of January 7. During this period, the Hells Angels had begun to lean on the FU Crew to operate for them in London. When this was refused, a vehicle belonging to the leader of the street gang (who had connections with the Outlaws) was burned. Tensions continued with two separate fires at a massage parlour and a strip club, and then the shooting on January 11 of two people associated with the Hells Angels. On the same day, a massage parlor in St. Thomas, Ontario, was burned down. Two more tattoo parlors were also threatened, and some Hells Angels pulled back to regain their footing. The conflict would eventually deescalate with a presumed peace being declared.

=== St. Lawrence River Conflict ===
In August 2022 the OPP, Kingston Police and Brockville Police executed search warrants in Odessa, Sydenham, and Kingston. This was reported to be related to ongoing tensions between the Outlaws and the Loners. Three men police believed to be members of the Outlaws were charged in connection with the warrants.

In 2023, tensions began to build again, this time in Cornwall, Ontario, and Brockville, Ontario, both located along the St. Lawrence River. On July 8, 2023, three people were sent to hospital in Ottawa, Ontario following an altercation between rival motorcycle club members in Cornwall, Ontario. One Outlaws member was shot and two Loners were stabbed, but their injuries were not life-threatening. During the altercation, one Outlaw forcibly removed a Loner's cut. Police confirmed that the incident involved the Outlaws and Loners and that they believed it to be targeted. Five people were arrested and charged but details of the charges have not yet been released. The provincial Biker Enforcement Unit is involved in the investigation.

Three days prior to this incident, on July 5, 2023, the OPP carried out a raid on an Outlaw clubhouse in Aylmer, along with seven other properties nearby in Southwestern Ontario. Police seized cocaine, oxycodone, and hydromorphone in the raids, along with weapons, including two sniper rifles. Police stated that the seizures show that the Outlaws and other motorcycle clubs are expanding into smaller communities and that they are able and willing to use deadly force.

On July 10, 2023, less than 36 hours after the Cornwall altercation, a large fire broke out at an Outlaws clubhouse in the downtown core of Brockville. The fire was significant and spread to multiple other structures and residences, forcing people to evacuate from their homes. Police have confirmed that the Loners are likely involved, but are not linking the two events. The fire was deemed suspicious due to the ownership of the building and significant amounts of fuel being found in the building. Later, the OPP Biker Enforcement Unit confirmed its involvement in the investigation and stated that they suspected arson. While both the Outlaws and Loners are known to locals, the Loners are believed to be a more recent addition to the area.

The head of the Biker Enforcement Unit, Inspector Scott Wade, stated that outlaw motorcycle clubs had expanded in recent years, mostly driven by "support" or "puppet" clubs which he said had grown exponentially. Wade also warned the public against wearing merchandise, colors, or cuts from any club to avoid being targeted by rivals. On the morning of July 14, 2023, police from multiple agencies searched six locations in Cornwall and Brockville. The locations were largely residential, and were related to ongoing investigations in the two communities. The Cornwall Police Chief, Vincent Foy, noted a recent increase in the visibility of outlaw motorcycle clubs in the area. Four more people were charged, bringing the total to nine, and multiple weapons were seized.

== See also ==
- List of outlaw motorcycle club conflicts
