= Giovanni Muscedere =

Canadian outlaw biker and gangster (1957–2006)

- Born: 25 May 1957; Windsor, Ontario, Canada
- Died: 7 April 2006 (aged 48); Elgin County, Ontario, Canada
- Other names: "John"; "Boxer"
- Occupations: Outlaw biker; gangster
- Years active: 1997–2006
- Known for: National president of the Bandidos in Canada
- Allegiance: Annihilators MC (1997–1999); Loners MC (1999–2002); Bandidos MC (2002–2006)

Giovanni "John" Muscedere (25 May 1957 – 7 April 2006), also known as "Boxer", was a Canadian outlaw biker and gangster who served as the national president of the Bandidos Motorcycle Club in Canada from 2002 until his murder in 2006.

== Criminal career ==
=== Entry into crime ===
Muscedere was born in Windsor, Ontario in 1959, the son of Italian immigrants, moving to Chatham at the age of 12. His parents, Domenico and Ortensia Muscedere, were from Vicalvi-Pozzuoli, Frosinone near Lazio, and left Italy in 1957 to escape post-war poverty. Muscedere grew up in an Italian-speaking household and he always spoke with an Italian accent, which he tried to hide by mumbling. Those who knew him described him as sounding like Sylvester Stallone's character Rocky Balboa. As a child, he was often bullied for being a "wop" and a "dogan" (derogatory Canadian slang for a Roman Catholic), and fought back, acquiring a great reputation as a fighter, which led him to take up boxing as his hobby. Muscedere's friends and family believed the childhood bullying had scarred him, making him adopt a tough persona to hide any weaknesses, which explained his love of boxing and later motorcycles. One who knew him stated: "He didn't really want to be somebody anybody could look down on. He wanted respect". Muscedere enjoyed some success as an amateur boxer, but his early marriage and his first child's birth prevented him from becoming a professional boxer as he would have liked, forcing him to take a job in order to support his family. Muscedere worked at a factory making automobile brakes in Chatham from 1979 until his murder, a job he hated as he found it very dull, but it gave him a good salary. After his first and second wives divorced him and were awarded custody of their children, Muscedere took up riding motorcycles, finding in the world of outlaw biking a surrogate family for those he had lost with his divorces. Muscedere had a strong sense of masculinity informed by traditional Italian values, for instance always paying the child support payments to both his ex-wives on time and in full on the grounds it was dishonourable for a father to let down his children. In 1997, Muscedere joined the Annihilators Motorcycle Club led by Wayne "Weiner" Kellestine. At the time, Muscedere was in a stressful second divorce and he came to find that Kellestine's farmhouse at 32196 Aberdeen Line outside of Iona Station to be a refuge from his troubles.

Muscedere deeply believed in biker "brotherhood", being known as a man who was utterly loyal to his friends. One who knew him said: "He was all or nothing. If he liked you, he liked you, and if he didn't like you, you knew". Peter Edwards, the crime correspondent with The Toronto Star stated about "Boxer" Muscedere: "Boxer's fatal flaw was that he didn't discriminate between false and real brotherhood. If someone played the brotherhood card, he was vulnerable. Pretty good way to manipulate him; some things were sacred, and brotherhood was. It's funny, some of these guys do have moral codes. Maybe not like ours. But to (Muscedere), brotherhood and family trumped everything." Muscedere was very loyal to his biker "brother" Kellestine, often donating money to help Kellestine pay the mortgage on his farm from his own salary, despite the fact that his other friends had warned him that Kellestine was just using him. Muscedere did not share Kellestine's views about non-whites, Jews or homosexuals, but Kellestine was the man who let him join the Annihilators, which made him his biker "brother". Having been bullied for being his ethnic background as a child, Muscedere didn't understand why Kellestine always referred to black people as "niggers", First Nations people as "redskins", gays as "faggots", East Asians as "gooks" and Jews as "kikes". When asked if he shared Kellestine's racial views, Muscedere often said that: "They all have a mother. People are who they are. They just have to be given respect. Look at how people look at us".

On 2 June 1999, Kellestine's Annihilators, based in St. Thomas, joined the Loners club in Woodbridge led by Gennaro "Jimmy" Raso. In face of the challenge coming from the Hells Angels, Kellestine decided he needed allies, and with the Outlaws being unwilling to accept him, he had decided to merge with the Loners instead. Kellestine, the Annihilators president, became the new president of the Chatham chapter of the Loners at the time of the merger in 1999. Following Kellestine into the Loners was Muscedere. For Kellestine and Muscedere, joining the Loners was a step up in the outlaw biker world, while the Loners – a disproportionate number of whom were Italian-Canadians from middle-class families – could barely hide their disdain for the Annihilators, whom they viewed as rustic bumpkins from Southwestern Ontario. The Loners had accepted the Annihilators because of the need to increase their numbers in face of the challenge from the Hells Angels.

At the time that Muscedere joined the Loners, he became close to another Loner and fellow Italian-Canadian, Frank "Bammer" Salerno, who to a certain extent displaced Kellestine as his best friend as Muscedere and Salerno would chat in Italian. In October 2001, Joe "Crazy Horse" Morin, president of the Edmonton chapter of the Rebels outlaw biker club, first contacted the Bandidos with the aim of "patching over". At a party at Kellestine's farm, Morin and the other Rebels were not impressed with Kellestine's eccentric behavior, seeing the Bandido treasurer Luis "Chopper" Raposo get high on various drugs and a "coked out" Muscedere lose his temper and beat up one of his "brothers" over a trivial matter. On 2 February 2002, Muscedere attended the London Auto Show and hugged Mario "Mike the Wop" Parente, the Outlaw national president. Both Muscedere and Parente were nearly involved in a brawl with the Hells Angels who were led by the Ottawa chapter president Paul "Sasquatch" Porter, and which in turn led the police to expel Muscedere from the building as a trouble-maker after he took to insulting the Angels on the auto show floor. In the spring of 2002, Muscedere became the Bandidos national vice president.

=== Bandidos national president ===
On 5 June 2002, the Royal Canadian Mounted Police, the Ontario Provincial Police, and the Sûreté du Québec targeted the Bandidos in Quebec and Ontario in a joint operation, Project Amigo. Amigo was initially facilitated under a different name and its initial purpose was to target the Rock Machine due to its participation in the Quebec Biker War; when the Rock Machine patched over to the Bandidos in January 2001, the operation was renamed and shifted focus to the Bandidos Canada. Every single Bandido (all of which were former members of the Rock Machine) in Quebec was arrested as were most of the Ontario members. The investigation was the end of the Bandidos in Quebec, finally ending the Quebec Biker War. As Project Amigo was originally started as an investigation of the Rock Machine, the former Loners in the Bandidos largely escaped charges, but Project Amigo crippled the Bandidos in Canada. The Bandidos' Canadian national president, Alain Brunette, was charged with conspiracy to import drugs, and Muscedere, as the only senior Bandido not in prison or facing charges, became his successor.

Following Project Amigo, the Canadian Bandidos consisted of fifteen members in Ontario spread over three chapters who were consolidated into a single chapter based in Toronto, although its members were actually scattered across Southern Ontario. Despite Muscedere's status as president of the Bandidos in Canada, he was overlooked by club leaders in other countries in favor of Glenn "Wrongway" Atkinson, the Irish immigrant who served as secretary-treasurer of the Canadian Bandidos or Atkinson's friend, George "Crash" Kriarakis. George Wegers, the American Bandidos president preferred to deal with Atkinson and Kriarakis, and Jason Addison, the president of Bandidos Australia, sent Atkinson a box of Bandido T-shirts to hand out to followers, instead of Muscedere. Unlike the Hells Angels in Toronto, who had clubhouses with security cameras, steel doors, and computers, the Toronto Bandidos had no clubhouse after June 2002. In July 2002, Kellestine was sentenced to two years in prison after being convicted of 22 counts of violating the laws governing guns, after the police discovered various illegal firearms at his farm in 1999. Muscedere donated money to help Kellestine pay his mortgage and forced the Bandidos to do so as well, despite the way that Kellestine was not popular.

Reflecting their embattled status within the world of outlaw biking, Atkinson suggested the name "no surrender crew" for the Toronto chapter, which was adopted. In 2003, Muscedre sent Atkinson on an extended visit back to his native Ireland in an unsuccessful attempt to have the Irish Alliance biker gang join the Bandidos. Boosting the profile of the Bandidos somewhat was the decision of veteran biker Frank Lenti in the fall of 2002 to join the Bandidos; he was a more experienced biker leader than Muscedere. The Hells Angels had offered Lenti a chance to "patch over" several times in 1993 and 1994 when was the president of the Loners, but he declined, instead offering HAMC leader Walter "Nurget" Stadnick a chance to join the Loners. Another experienced outlaw biker who joined the Bandidos was James "Ripper" Fullager, who had been active in outlaw biking since the 1960s and whose home in Toronto was a favorite hangout for the Bandidos, where Fullager recounted his past adventures and gave them advice. Atkinson later stated that he left the Bandidos because of Muscedere's leadership, saying Muscedere was addicted to cocaine, his judgement was poor, he lacked political savvy and was not connected to reality, preferring to focus on promoting so-called biker "brotherhood" by devoting much time to the design of Christmas cards to his fellow Bandidos instead of making difficult decisions. Muscedere was incapable of managing finances – both his own and that of his club – and his moods were volatile. However, Muscedere was regarded as loyal to his friends and he often said he did everything "top left", which his way of saying "from the heart". Moreover, Edwards wrote that Muscedere was regarded as far preferable than Kellestine with his "... mercurial mood swings and stream-of-consciousness rantings, in which he somehow equated the Confederacy, the American Revolution and Nazism with goodness and Canada. Boxer Muscedere could barely read and write and didn't play historian, but he was straightforward, honest, fearless and loyal to a fault, which just fine with them".

In January 2003, Joe Morin of the Edmonton Rebels visited Toronto to discuss "patching over". Despite his misgivings about the Bandidos, Morin felt in face of the challenge from the Hells Angels that joining the Bandidos was the best way to ensure the survival of his chapter, and agreed that the Edmonton chapter of the Rebels be granted "hang-around" status with the Bandidos. The Victoria Day weekend in May is usually start of the riding season for outlaw bikers in Canada. For Victoria Day in 2003, it turned out that only Muscedere, Lenti, Atkinson and Kriarakis actually owned working Harley-Davidson motorcycles, which humiliated Lenti, who complained about "bikers without bikes".

In June 2003, Kriarakis was eating in a restaurant in Vaughan where he was surrounded by a dozen Hells Angels and was ordered to go out to the parking lot to be beaten, as Vaughan was considered to be "their" territory. One of Kriarakis' friends called Lenti on his cellphone, who promptly raced off in his tow truck to help Kriarakis, while Kriarakis was badly beaten up in the parking lot. Upon arriving, Lenti was furious to see that Kriarakis had called the police to report the assault, telling him that outlaw bikers never report to the police a crime committed by other outlaw bikers, even against themselves. At a meeting of Fullager's house, Kriarakis was taken to task for his violation of the outlaw biker code, which publicly humiliated the Toronto Bandido chapter. Morin, who was considering "patching over" to join the Bandidos, expressed much doubt after the Kriarakis incident, saying the only members of the Toronto chapter who impressed him were Atkinson and Lenti. In July 2003, the Hells Angels threatened to put "jailhouse contracts" on the lives of the imprisoned Quebec Bandidos if they did not agree to retire from organized crime forever and promise to never open a Bandido chapter in Quebec again. Muscedere submitted to the ultimatum after Brunette begged him to accept, and stated that henceforward the Bandidos would expand into Western Canada, with Muscedere talking about a drive to the Pacific. Muscedere called the Quebec Bandidos "cowards" for submitting to the ultimatum. On 30 January 2004, Morin was murdered together with his friend, Robert Simpson, in the parking lot of an Edmonton strip club, Saint Pete's, possibly by the Hells Angels. Muscedere was greatly offended that the men from the new chapter in Winnipeg that was trying to establish at the same time as a chapter in Edmonton did not show up for Morin's funeral while he and other Toronto chapter members attended.

In July 2004, Muscedere toured western Canada and opened a new Bandido chapter in Winnipeg, whose members were only probationary members. During the same visit, Muscedere persuaded the Rebels of Edmonton to join the Bandidos. On 24 July 2004, Muscedere sent out an email to all Canadian Bandidos announcing that his girlfriend Nina Lee was about to give birth, and his expansion into Western Canada had finally worked. In August 2004, after being released from prison following his conviction on gun and drug charges, Kellestine become the sargento de armas of the Canadian Bandidos, and was displeased at the way his former protegee Muscedere now overshadowed him. Edwards wrote that outlaw biker clubs claim that they are all about freedom, but in reality outlaw biker clubs are rigid, rule-bound organizations run in a quasi-militaristic fashion with a strict hierarchy and rules governing every aspect of the members' existence. Within that context, making Kellestine the sergeant-at-arms responsible to president Muscedere, a man whom Kellestine had given orders to when he was the Annihilators' president, was the source of great resentment to him. One of Muscedere's neighbors in Chatham remarked to Edwards that "the puppet has cut his strings". During the Taste of the Danforth festival in Toronto in August 2004, Atkinson met Kriarakis to tell him he was planning on leaving the Bandidos, saying that Muscedere had lost contact with reality, being short-sighted and ill-tempered; Kellestine was dangerous, and another club member, Michael "Taz" Sandham, seemed like a shady character. Atkinson wanted Kriarakis to follow him into the Outlaws, and when the latter refused, Atkinson remarked: "These guys are going to get you killed one day".

In October 2004, Atkinson, the Bandido secretary who was well regarded by the club's "mother chapter" in Houston, resigned from the Bandidos to join the Outlaws. When Atkinson arrived at Kellestine's farm to hand in his Bandido patch, Muscedere and Kellestine beat him bloody with the latter ramming a handgun into his mouth and threatened to kill him if ever saw him again. In November 2004, Lenti quit the Bandidos, saying that Muscedere was addicted to cocaine and Kellestine was insane, and he was tired of dealing with both of them. Unlike Atkinson, Lenti was not beaten as he had a fearsome reputation as a fighter who was known for his habit of gouging out the eyes of his enemies. Lenti was a living legend within Ontario outlaw biker circles and his resignation was a great blow to the already waning prestige of the club. In October 2004, the new Bandido chapter in Edmonton defected in its entirety over to the Hells Angels with not a single member choosing to stay with the Bandidos. The way in which the Edmonton Bandidos had used their membership as a mere bargaining ploy to enter the Hells Angels greatly hurt Muscedere's ego as he learned that all of them had really wanted to join the Hells Angels.

The Bandidos Toronto chapter lacked a clubhouse, and for a time in 2003 and 2004, Muscedere used as their clubhouse the basement of a Greek restaurant, which George Kriarakis had been able to rent. The Bandidos lost their clubhouse when the Toronto chapter president, Frank Salerno, had a meal in the restaurant and left without paying for it. Muscedere had Michael "Little Mikey" Trotta rent out as the Bandidos clubhouse a property on Jefferson Avenue in Liberty Village in Toronto in January 2005. In March 2005, the landlord refused Trotta's rent cheque and offered to refund the first and last months' rent if the Bandidos were to disband their clubhouse immediately. By April 2005, Muscedere was holding his Bandidos meetings at a farm in Stouffville or in the Oriental Taste Restaurant, whose dining room Muscedere would rent for a few hours every Sunday afternoon.

The Bandidos were not a profitable group as Muscedere had his Telus and Fido cellphone accounts cut off in the first half of 2005 owing to his inability to pay his phone bills. In a sign of the Toronto chapter's general poverty, in June 2005 the shared cellphone plan the chapter had with Telus ended with them being cut off because of arrears. Muscedere owed $150.67, Paul "Big Paulie" Sinopoli $191.23, Michael Trotta $88.77, George "Pony" Jessome $136.66 and Wayne Kellestine $88.33. That month George Wegers of Bandidos USA was arrested by the Federal Bureau of Investigation. He was replaced as president by Jeff Pike, who was critical of the Canadian Bandidos. To maintain his dwindling prestige following the defection of the Edmonton chapter to the Hells Angels, Muscedere wanted to keep the Winnipeg chapter despite his increasing difficult relations with the chapter president Michael Sandham. Through Muscedere found himself disliking Sandham, the possibility of having the Bandidos being reduced down to a single chapter again was too humiliating, which made him desperate to keep the Winnipeg chapter.

=== The "no-surrender crew" ===
On 28 December 2005, the American leadership of the Bandidos, who had grown increasingly unhappy with Muscedere's leadership, expelled him and his followers, charging that they were failing to make money, not paying their monthly membership dues because they did not have the money, and were going about business in a "sloppy" manner, leaving them wide open to prosecution. An officer with the Texas Department of Public Safety told the journalist Julien Sher of The Globe and Mail in 2006: "Because their numbers were so low in Canada, the U.S. Bandidos had tried to separate themselves from Canada. When you get to the point when you're not even breaking even – on drugs, like any other trade – you decide to close the business. If you're not bringing anything into the pot, you're a liability instead of an asset". In defense of Muscedere, Salerno wrote in an email to Carleton "Pervert" Bare, the secretary of the Bandidos in the U.S., that the national president had tried five times to visit Houston. Salerno wrote: "He was turned down everytime and the last time detained until he was deemed an undesirable and escorted back to Canadian soil. The next time he is caught trying to enter he will face criminal charges". The rules of the "Bandido Nation" required that the leadership in Houston be consulted before the Toronto chapter could open any new chapters in Canada, and the leaders in Texas were stunned to learn via Sandham that there was a Bandido chapter in Winnipeg. Sandham had written emails to Houston denouncing Muscedere for refusing to grant "full patches" to the Winnipeg chapter, which was the first time Houston had learned that there was a Bandido chapter in Manitoba.

Muscedere took the expulsions, together with loss of their right to wear the Bandido patches, very badly, writing in an email to an American Bandido Keinard "Hawaiian Ken" Post, which, reflecting his semi-literate status, was full of spelling and grammatical errors together with a complete disregard for punctuation and capitalization, that read:

"my brother ken you will always be my brother there is no reason too [to] take something the canadian brothers value more than there [their] own lives when a brother is down you reach out your hand too [to] help them not kick them down I feel like a knife has been driven into my heart would you beleave [believe] it my own brother has done what my enemys [enemies] could never do with my own death".

After being ordered to return their Bandido patches and property, Muscedere sent out an email to Bandidos chapters around the world calling for a vote to allow him and his followers to stay. Jeff Pike, the international leader of the Bandidos, in an email told Muscedere: "Bandidos don't vote, they do what the fuck they're told".

Muscedere and his followers took to calling themselves the "no surrender crew" after an ultra-violent fraction in the Irish Republican Army opposed to the Good Friday Agreement of 1998, because they refused the orders from Houston to surrender their patches, saying they were going to stay on as Bandidos despite Pike's decision to expel them. Outlaw bikers attach enormous symbolic importance to their patches, which show which club they belong to and what their position is within their club. The patches belong to the club, not to the men wearing them, and must be returned at once if a member is expelled or resigns. Within the world of outlaw bikers, it is considered extremely offensive for someone to wear the patch of a club that they do not belong to, and violence usually results when someone wears a patch of a club that they are not a member of. The Bandidos patch, known as the "Fat Mexican", consists of a caricature of a Mexican bandit wearing a sombrero, holding a sword in one hand and a pistol in the other.

Pike was greatly displeased by the refusal of the "no surrender crew" to return their patches together with Muscedere's call for a vote to allow the Toronto chapter to stay, bluntly announcing the "Bandido Nation" was not a democracy. At the same time, Sandham was writing emails to Houston disavowing Muscedere and the rest of the "no surrender crew", proclaiming in highly obsequious language that he was with Houston against the "no surrender crew". Sandham had also told Kellestine at this time that the "no surrender crew" were planning to "patch over" to join the Outlaws without him. Kellestine believed what Sandham had told him, and this bit of misinformation turned Kellestine against the "no surrender crew". For Kellestine, outlaw biking was his life, and to be left alone without belonging to any club would be a sort of death for him. A reprieve of sorts was won for the "no surrender crew" when George Kriarakis, who had no criminal record, was able to visit Houston and made a good impression. Kriarakis was appointed president of Bandidos Canada, but, an unassertive man, he surrendered the title back to Muscedere. The status of the "no surrender crew" was somewhat ambiguous afterwards, perhaps because it would be humiliating for Houston to have "no surrender crew" wear their Bandido patches without Houston being able to do anything about it. In January 2006, Muscedere went to Denmark and Germany to meet the Danish and German Bandido leaders, seeking their support against the American leaders.

For their part, the Winnipeg chapter believed that Muscedere was an incompetent leader whose poor relations with Houston had prevented them from being granted full patches. Kellestine had been ordered by Houston to "pull the patches" on the "no surrender crew" or be expelled himself, and in March 2006, Kellestine had asked the Winnipeg chapter for help. Kellestine, who frequently consumed the drugs he was supposed to sell and who was deeply in debt with the bank frequently threatening to foreclose on his farm he brought in 1982, had discovered that selling methamphetamine was a lucrative business, and was greatly annoyed when Muscedere had ordered him to stop selling methamphetamine under the grounds that it was wrong. Muscedere was addicted to cocaine, but he felt that selling methamphetamine was wrong and forbade all Bandidos from selling "crystal meth". Stratford, Ontario is regarded as the "meth-making capital" of Canada as methamphetamine is usually manufactured in rural areas as it gives off an unpleasant smell and needs anhydrous ammonia as an ingredient, a fertilizer commonly sold in rural stores. As there was huge demand for methamphetamine in Winnipeg, Kellestine believed an alliance with Sandham would make him rich as he knew many of the methamphetamine makers in the countryside around Stratford. The indebted Kellestine frequently complained that the other members were more interested having the chapter serve as a social club rather than as a money-making concern, which echoed the feelings of the American leadership of the Bandidos. Kellestine was behind in paying property taxes to Dutton/Dunwich township in Elgin County, owing the township some $10,303.30 in unpaid taxes, and frequently resorted to selling bootleg whiskey and smuggled cigarettes to pay his bills. The crime journalist Yves Lavigne told The London Free Press: "On a scale of one to 10, this group of Bandidos rated somewhere between one and zero".

== The Shedden massacre ==
At the beginning of April 2006, Kellestine accused one of the "no surrender crew", Jamie "Goldberg" Flanz, of being a police informer. As Flanz was Jewish and the rabidly anti-Semitic Kellestine hated him for that, Muscedere did not take the allegation seriously, but to settle the matter, it was agreed that the "no surrender crew" would visit Kellestine's farm to discuss his claims. Most of the "no surrender crew" lived in the Toronto area, but Kellestine insisted that the meeting be held at his farm, and Muscedere agreed. Kellestine also stated that Sandham and some other members of the Winnipeg chapter were staying with him, which was intended as a "bait" as knew that relations between Muscedere and Sandham were very poor. Muscedere and the "no surrender crew" were planning to "pull the patch" on Kellestine, whose racist paranoia had become too much for them. Going with Muscedere were Frank Salerno, George Jessome, Luis Raposo, Michael Trotta, Paul Sinopoli, Jamie Flanz and George Kriarakis.

On the night of 7 April 2006, at a meeting at Kellestine's farm attended by the two factions, which began at about 10:30 pm when the "no surrender crew" entered his barn. The barn was full of rusting machinery, old furniture, and children's toys while its walls were decorated with pornographic photographs of buxom young women sitting atop Harley-Davidson motorcycles or half-dressed as construction workers together with "Kellestine's usual Nazi propaganda". Kellestine instructed his guests to stay in the middle where he had cleared out some space. Sandham was standing in the rafters with a rifle, while Dwight "Big Dee" Mushey, Frank Mather, Marcelo "Fat Ass" Aravena and a biker known as "M.H." were patrolling outside armed with rifles and shotguns, and Brett Gardiner listened to the police scanners inside Kellestine's house.

Accordingly, to one version of the events, upon entering the barn, Luis Raposo saw Sandham with his rifle, and realizing that he been betrayed, fired at him with his sawed-off shotgun. Sandham was only slightly injured as he was wearing a bullet-proof vest, returned fire and killed Raposo. However, Raposo's favorite gesture was to "give the finger", and the autopsy revealed at the time of his death, Raposo had raised his middle finger while the rest of his fingers clinched into his fist and that Sandham's bullet had gone through Raposo's raised finger, shattering it completely. The forensic evidence does not support's Sandham's claim that Raposo had fired at him, and moreover Sandham is a "well known pathological liar" not known for his willingness to take responsibility for his actions. It is not entirely clear what happened other than Raposo was giving Sandham the finger at the time when Sandham used his skills as a marksman to put a bullet through it.

Two of the "no surrender crew", Paul Sinopoli and George Kriarakis attempted to flee, but were shot down and wounded by Kellestine who was armed with a handgun. Kellestine shouted: "Everybody get on the floor! Nobody move! I'm here to pull your patches. This is being done by the orders of the States [the U.S leadership of the Bandidos]". Kellestine ordered his bodyguard, Frank Mather, to shoot Muscedere if he moved. Despite the orders, Muscedere bended over Raposo's body and told Kellestine he was still alive and needed to go the hospital at once. To force Muscedere to sit still, Kellestine said: "If anyone wants to smoke, then Boxer's got to sit down". The anti-Semitic Kellestine took to tormenting Jewish Flanz, pistol-whipping him and telling him "I'm going to do you last because you're a fucking Jew!" Flanz sat crossed-legged on the floor with his hands on the back of his head while Kellestine kept pistol-whipping him and ramming his gun into his face, saying he was about to die followed up by saying "just kidding". Muscedere defended Flanz, saying he was not a police informer and asked Kellestine to stop tormenting Flanz. At one point, Kellestine went outside with George Jessome to have Jessome use his tow truck to move Raposo's car. While Kellestine was out of the barn, Sandham accused Raposo of embezzlement and forced Paul Sinopoli at gunpoint to confess that he had stealing alongside Raposo. In response, Muscedere stated: "Well, I didn't know. Chopper [Raposo] didn't tell me".

Over the next two hours, Kellestine frequently changed his mind about whether he was going to "pull the patches" or execute the "no surrender crew", and at one point allowed Muscedere to call his girlfriend, Nina Lee, on his cell phone provided he "didn't say anything fucking stupid". Muscedere told Lee: "How's the baby? I'll see you in a couple hours. I love you." The macho Muscedere decided to be faithful to the outlaw bikers' code of never asking for help, and did not alert Lee to his predicament, instead asking about how their daughter Angelina was doing.

As the men were marched out and shot, Kellestine, who been drinking very heavily that night, danced a jig while singing Das Deutschlandlied. Between dancing, singing and executing his prisoners, Kellestine would go over to torment Flanz. Realizing he was doomed, Muscedere stated: "Do me. Do me first. I want to go out like a man." Muscedere was marched out of the barn by Kellestine, Mushey and Aravena and forced to sit in his car. As Muscedere sat down in his car, he broke out laughing at Kellestine for reasons that remain unknown. Kellestine shot him in the head at point-blank range, followed by another shot to his chest. A police wiretap recorded that Mushey told Aravena and M.H. about Muscedere's execution on 12 June 2006: "This guy, he went out like a man...He laughed. Went like a man.".

Shortly after the massacre, James "Ripper" Fullager, the mentor to the "no surrender crew", died of cancer; on his deathbed, he had complained that the Canadian outlaw biking scene had gone downhill since his youth in the 1960s as now most "bikers" didn't know how to ride motorcycles and the outlaw biker code no longer counted with biker "brothers" killing each other. Meeting with Atkinson on his deathbed, Fullager commented it was clear that Kellestine had committed the massacre as the bodies were found close to Kellestine's farm in southwestern Ontario, all of the victims except Muscedere came from the greater Toronto area, and Kellestine was still alive. Fullager noted that if the Hells Angels had massacred the Bandidos in southwestern Ontario close to Kellestine's farm, they would have killed Kellestine as well.

Muscedere's funeral was held at St. Joseph's Roman Catholic Church in Chatham where his younger Cesideio Muscedere praised him as a man devoted to his family and biker "brothers". In Houston, the American Bandidos removed all messages of online condolence posted on their website for the "Shedden 8" massacre victims, which indicated disapproval by the American leadership of Muscedere and the other victims. The autopsy revealed that Muscedere had drunk no alcohol or used any drugs on the night of his murder, making him alongside George "Crash" Kriarakis and Paul "Big Paulie" Sinopoli to be the only ones to be drug-free as autopsies found alcohol, cocaine, oxycodone, heroin and marijuana in the blood of the other victims.

During the trial of the Shedden massacre killers in 2009, Jane Sims, the crime correspondent of The London Free Press, stated the Bandidos Motorcycle Club sounded like the mindlessly macho He-Men Women Haters Club from the Our Gang short films of the 1930s. Edwards agreed with her, writing the Bandidos with their "grandiose rituals and overblown mythology" seemed "more the stuff of fantasy and macho escapism than real life" that appealed to weak, insecure men. Edwards wrote that most of the victims were weak men who were attracted to the Bandidos less because they were criminals and more out of a desire to appear important and powerful, but Muscedere stood half-way between the gangsters masquerading as bikers and the weak, insecure men pretending to be powerful because they were Bandidos.

== Books ==
- Baker, Thomas (2014), Biker Gangs and Transnational Organized Crime, Routledge, ISBN 978-1317524113
- Caine, Alex (2009), The Fat Mexican: The Bloody Rise of the Bandidos Motorcycle Club, Random House, ISBN 978-0-30735-660-4
- Edwards, Peter (2010), The Bandido Massacre; A True Story of Bikers, Brotherhood and Betrayal, HarperCollins Publishers Ltd, ISBN 978-1-5546-8044-3
- Langton, Jerry (2010), Showdown: How the Outlaws, Hells Angels and Cops Fought for Control of the Streets, John Wiley & Sons, ISBN 978-0470678787
