= LMC =

LMC may refer to:

== Places ==
- Lok Ma Chau station, a railway station in Hong Kong
- La Macarena Airport (IATA: LMC)
- London Muslim Centre

== Businesses and companies ==
- Logan Machine Company, a snowcat manufacturer
- Lordstown Motors Corporation
- Lincoln Motor Company
- Logical Machine Corporation, a defunct computer company
- Legacy Motor Club

== Education and schools ==
- Lake Michigan College, Michigan, United States
- Landmark College, Putney, Vermont, United States
- Lees–McRae College, North Carolina
- Le Moyne College, DeWitt, New York
- School of Literature, Media, and Communication, Georgia Institute of Technology, Atlanta, Georgia, United States
- Lon Morris College, Jacksonville, Texas
- Los Medanos College, Pittsburg, California
- Our Lady of the Lake Catholic High School, formerly Lake Michigan Catholic High School, Michigan, United States

== Entertainment and culture ==
- LMC (British band), an English dance group
- LM.C, a Japanese rock band
- London Musicians Collective, a UK charity for the promotion of experimental music

== Organisations ==
- Lake Michigan Conference (Michigan), a high school athletic conference
- Lancaster Mennonite Conference, an American Anabaptist Christian denomination (1711-)
- Latur Municipal Corporation
- Local Medical Committee, a UK statutory organisation representing general medical practitioners
- Loners Motorcycle Club, an international outlaw motorcycle club
- Lucknow Municipal Corporation, civic body that governs the city of Lucknow, India

== Science and engineering ==
- Large Magellanic Cloud, a dwarf galaxy near the Milky way
- Lateral motor column neuron
- Least material condition in geometric dimensioning and tolerancing
- Little man computer, an instructional model of a computer
- Local mate competition, a mechanism that affects sex allocation in evolutionary biology

== Other ==
- Lower middle class
- Late Middle Chinese, the language of Chinese medieval rhyme tables

== See also ==
- IMC (disambiguation)
- 1MC, 1 Main Circuit
- LMCS (disambiguation)
