= IMC =

IMC may refer to:

== Aviation ==
- IMC rating, a UK-issued rating for flying in instrument meteorological conditions
- Instrument meteorological conditions, weather conditions that require pilots to fly primarily by instruments

== Mathematics competitions ==
- Intermediate Mathematical Challenge, a challenge for students aged between 11 and 16, organised by the UK Mathematics Trust
- International Mathematics Competition for University Students, an annual mathematics competition for undergraduate mathematics students

== Businesses and organizations ==
=== Finance ===
- IMC Financial Markets, a privately held company headquartered in Amsterdam
- Investment Migration Council, sets standards in the investment migration industry
- International Marketmakers Combination, a derivatives trading house

=== Government and quasi-government agencies ===
- Independent Monitoring Commission, an organisation providing the British government with reports on paramilitary ceasefires in Northern Ireland
- Information Management Center (Puntland), a government agency in Puntland
- International Maritime Confederation, the umbrella association of maritime organizations and marine societies on the European level
- Islamabad Metropolitan Corporation, the municipal authority governing Islamabad
- Irish Medical Council, the Irish regulatory body for the medical professions
- Indore Municipal Corporation, governing body of the Indian city of Indore

=== Healthcare ===
- Intermountain Medical Center, a hospital in Murray, UT, US
- International Medical Center, a hospital in Jeddah, Saudi Arabia
- International Medical Corps, a global, humanitarian, nonprofit organization
- Irish Medical Council, the Irish regulatory body for the medical professions

=== Media ===
- IMC AG, a publishing house and software company
- Immersive Media Company, former Canadian digital imaging company
- Independent Media Center Also Indymedia or IMC. A global network of journalists that report on political and social issues
- International Music Council, a UNESCO-sponsored organization promoting the development of international music-making
- Irish Multiplex Cinemas, a chain of cinemas in the Republic of Ireland and Northern Ireland owned by Ward Anderson
- Indy's Music Channel, a television station in Indianapolis, Indiana

=== Other businesses and organizations ===
- IMC Global (International Minerals and Chemical), a former mining and chemical business that merged into The Mosaic Company
- Indian Muslim Council, an advocacy group based in the US
- Institute of Management Consultants USA, a national body certifying professional management consultants
- Intel Mobile Communications, a part of the Intel Architecture Group
- International Market Centers, owner of furniture showroom space at World Market Center Las Vegas
- International Medieval Congress, annual academy congress on the study of the European Middle Ages (c. 300–1500) held at the University of Leeds
- International Metalworking Companies, a precision tools conglomerate headquartered in Israel
- Internet Mail Consortium, an organization providing information about Internet e-mail standards and technologies
- Irish Mountaineering Club

== Religion ==
- A church of the Fellowship of Independent Methodist Churches
- International Meditation Centre, which promotes the practice of Theravāda Buddhist vipassanā meditation
- Consolata Missionaries, Roman Catholic missionary congregation

== Other uses ==
- The Infinite Monkey Cage, a popular science radio programme in the UK
- Integrated memory controller, a feature of some CPUs in computers
- Instructional manipulation check, a question in a questionnaire to check whether respondents pay attention to the instructions
- Intermediate Metal Conduit, formal term in electrical codes for a type of metallic conduit (thin-wall tubing)
- Integrated Marketing Communications, a body of academic and practical work promoting a management approach to marketing
- International Championship for Manufacturers, a rally series and predecessor to the World Rally Championship
- International Mechanical Code, a convention published by the International Code Council (ICC) through the governmental consensus process
- Isothermal microcalorimetry (IMC), a laboratory method for real-time monitoring and dynamic analysis of chemical, physical and biological processes
- It's My City, a Russian news site
- In Motion Charging, electric bus type
- Immature myeloid cell
