= LMCS =

LMCS may refer to:

- Lockheed Martin Control Systems, the former name of the Platform Solutions division of BAE Systems Electronics, Intelligence & Support
- Logical Methods in Computer Science, a scientific journal in theoretical computer science
- IEEE 802, the LAN/MAN Standards Committee (LMCS)

== See also ==
- LMC (disambiguation)
