= Annihilators Motorcycle Club =

Outlaw motorcycle club

Annihilators MC
- Annihilators insignia
- Founded: 1988; 38 years ago
- Founding location: Chatham, Ontario, Canada
- Years active: 1988–1999
- Territory: Southwestern Ontario
- Leader: Wayne Kellestine
- Activities: Drug trafficking, extortion, armed robbery, murder, assault, kidnapping
- Allies: Outlaws MC
- Rivals: Hells Angels

The Annihilators Motorcycle Club was a Canadian outlaw biker club and organized crime group of the 1980s and 1990s.

== Origins ==
The club began as the Queensmen Motorcycle Club based in Amherstburg. The Queensman Motorcycle Club was established in the 1950s. From 1977 to 2000, the most powerful biker club in Ontario were the Outlaws. In 1982, the Outlaw chapter in London, Ontario arranged to have the Amherstburg Queensmen move up to the London area to serve as a puppet club, which was renamed as the Holocaust Motorcycle Club and based in Chatham. Wayne Kellestine was appointed the president of the Holocaust club, whose name had been intentionally chosen with the aim of being offensive. The logo of the Holocaust club was a white skull with a lightning bolt, which was clearly inspired by the SS logo of a totenkopf with two white lightning bolt runes that read "SS". Kellestine had been seeking to join the Outlaws since 1977, and the decision to appoint him president of the Holocaust club was a sop to his ego as the Outlaws did not want him as a member of their club proper.

== The club ==
The best known member of the Holocaust Club was Brian "Bo" Beaucage, who had been one of the leaders of the prison riot at the Kingston Penitentiary that took place between 14 and 18 April 1971. Beaucage had a certain degree of fame in the Canadian underworld for his actions during the prison riot when he used a board with a nail sticking through it to execute two child molester prisoners. In 1985, Beaucage quarreled with Kellestine, which led him to move to Kitchener, where he joined Satan's Choice, the enemies of the Outlaws.

In 1988, the club was renamed as the Annihilators and relocated to St. Thomas, but Kellestine continued as club president. The logo of the Annihilators was a mailed fist clenching the light-bolt runes of the SS. The journalist Jerry Langton called the Annihilators "small-time crooks". The journalist Peter Edwards called the Annihilators a "motley but tough" gang whose members joined with the hope of being promoted to the Outlaws. The clubhouse of the Annihilators on 54 Mondamin Street in St. Thomas, was described as a decaying building with steel plates on the windows and security cameras all around. Kellestine had a practice of tossing roofing nails into the parking lot to keep police cars away from the clubhouse, which he would then forget where he placed, thus puncturing the tires of any automobile that happened to park in the clubhouse's parking lot. The Annihilators' clubhouse was known to locals as a "booze can" where contraband cigarettes together with stolen goods were sold by the Annihilators who spent their days and nights there drinking and playing pool. The Toronto biker Frank Lenti called the clubhouse a "glorified chicken coop" that was dirty and smelly. In an interview with the journalist Yves Lavigne, published in The London Free Press on 18 April 1998, the Annihilators were described by Lavinge as having "a low profile, making money on the drug trade."

In February 1989, during the annual London Motorcycle Show, which was hosted at the Western Fairgrounds, the president of the Annihilators Motorcycle Club St. Thomas chapter, Wayne Kellestine became inebriated at the event. Kellestine physically assaulted a police officer and then attempted to flee by hijacking a limousine, leading to a car chase that ended with him crashing the car into the Outlaws' clubhouse on Egerton Street. Kellestine was charged with assaulting a police officer, theft, public drunkenness, property damage, resisting arrest and driving under the influence of alcohol, and was convicted on all counts. The incident confirmed Kellestine's reputation as a "heat score" (underworld slang for a criminal who attracts police attention with his antics), which was why he was never invited to join the Outlaws, and why his club would cease to be a support club for them in the late 1990s.

In January 1992, the Annihilators first attracted widespread attention when Kellestine led the police to the body of David Kenneth O'Neil, which was found buried in a shallow grave in a cornfield near Kellestine's farmhouse at 32196 Aberdeen Line outside of Iona Station. O'Neil was wanted for killing Constable Scott Rossiter of the Ontario Provincial Police (OPP) on 19 September 1991. The manhunt for O'Neil attracted international attention, being featured on the American television show Unsolved Mysteries. During his time on the run, O'Neil constantly sought out the company of the Annihilators. Michael Simmons, a police informer within the Outlaws, accused the Annihilators of O'Neil's murder, saying in an interview: "He wouldn't stay put. So they put him on ice". After the murder, Kellestine together with three other Annihilators started to wear the SS runes patches on the front of their biker jackets, which within the outlaw biker subculture indicates one has committed a murder.

In February 1991, Michael Simmons, the brother of Andrew "Teach" Simmons, the Outlaws' national president who lived in London, Ontario, became a police informer. On 12 March 1992, the Ontario Provincial Police arrested 18 people, including two Outlaws with the rest being Annihilators.

== Joining the Loners ==
On June 2, 1999, the Annihilators Motorcycle Club, joined the larger Loners Motorcycle Club based in Woodbridge. It was led by Gennaro "Jimmy" Raso. In face of the challenge from the Hells Angels, Kellestine decided he needed allies and, with the Outlaws being unwilling to accept him, had decided to merge with the Loners instead. Kellestine, the Annihilators president, became the new president of the Chatham chapter of the Loners at the time of the merger in 1999. Following Kellestine into the Loners was another Annihilator, Giovanni Muscedere. For Kellestine and Muscedere, joining the Loners was a step up in the outlaw biker world, while the Loners – a disproportionate number of whom were Italian-Canadians from middle-class families – could barely hide their disdain for the Annihilators, whom they viewed as rustic bumpkins from southwestern Ontario. This merging of the Annihilators along with other clubs into the Loners was an attempt to increase the club's membership to deal with the incoming threat of the Hells Angels. One prominent Loner, Irish immigrant Glenn "Wrongway" Atkinson, was heard to remark after meeting Kellestine for the first time: "Can you believe the type of people we're attracting?"

== Books ==
- Caine, Alex (2009), The Fat Mexican: The Bloody Rise of the Bandidos Motorcycle Club, Random House, ISBN 978-0-30735-660-4
- Edwards, Peter (2010), The Bandido Massacre; A True Story of Bikers, Brotherhood and Betrayal, HarperCollins Publishers Ltd, ISBN 978-0307372765
- Edwards, Peter (2013). Unrepentant The Strange and (Sometimes) Terrible Life of Lorne Campbell, Satan's Choice and Hells Angels Biker. Toronto: Vintage Canada. ISBN 9781554680443.
- Edwards, Peter (2023), The Biker's Brother, HarperCollins Canada, ISBN 978-1554519354
- Langton, Jerry (2010), Showdown: How the Outlaws, Hells Angels and Cops Fought for Control of the Streets, John Wiley & Sons, ISBN 978-0470678787
