= Loners Motorcycle Club =

Outlaw motorcycle club

Loners MC
- Founded: 1979; 47 years ago
- Founders: Gennaro Raso and Frank Lenti
- Founding location: Woodbridge, Ontario, Canada
- Years active: 1979–present
- Territory: Canada, Italy, Spain, Portugal, England, France, Germany, Belgium, Netherlands, United States, Australia, New Zealand, Dominican Republic, [Indonesia]
- Ethnicity: Multicultural
- Membership: Estimated to have 1,000 active members across the globe
- Leaders: Jimmy Raso (World President)
- Allies: Road Runners MC; Bandidos; Mongols MC; Annihilators MC Dirty Dozen MC; Vigilantes MC Eleventh Hour RC
- Rivals: Satan's Choice; Hells Angels (1999–2002); Sons of Silence; Vagos MC (2012–2015)
- Notable members: Wayne Kellestine; Giovanni "Boxer" Muscedere; Glenn "Wrongway" Atkinson; Frank "Bammer" Salerno; Frank Passarelli; David W Fritts Cutter1%er

The Loners Motorcycle Club (LMC) is an international outlaw motorcycle club founded in Woodbridge, Ontario, Canada in 1979. It has seventeen chapters in Canada, eleven chapters in Italy, eleven in the United States, and several chapters in other countries. The club was established by two prominent Italian-Canadian bikers, Frank Lenti and Gennaro Raso.

== Early history ==
The Loners Motorcycle Club was founded in 1979 by Frank "Cisco" Lenti. Lenti first joined the Satan's Choice Motorcycle Club and left in 1978. Another reason may have been that an ambitious Lenti never rose above the rank of prospect in Satan's Choice, causing him to leave. Regardless they both decided to leave the Satan's Choice and we're involved in starting a chapter of the Rebels Motorcycle Club in Toronto, this lasted for roughly a year before they decided to form the Loners Motorcycle Club in 1979. Lenti designed the "rather elaborate and bizarre" patch for his club featuring a half-werewolf, half-horned skull creature.

In 1981, Lenti was kicked out of the club for a period. It was alleged that Lenti had stolen from the club and was caught, at which point he decided to flee the country to Italy, where he lived for the next two years. With Gennaro Raso's blessing, Lenti officially rejoined the Loners Motorcycle Club in 1984. When Lenti was removed from the club, he travelled to Italy, and continued to use the Loners name despite his removal from the club in 1981. While in Italy, he persuaded other motorcycle clubs to join the Loners. He also opened several new chapters. These chapters were not associated with the official Loners MC until Lenti's return to the club in 1984, when all new chapters were officially recognized. He set up a chapter in York Region, recruiting mainly from his fellow Italian-Canadians as the group normally did. A disproportionate number of the Loners were Italian-Canadians from middle-class families who saw themselves as being more polished and sophisticated than other outlaw bikers.

Lenti has never acknowledged the thefts or removal from his former club. He stated in 2017, it was due to the fact that Satan's Choice member Cecil Kirby turned police informer in 1980. Lenti claimed Kirby told him that he should leave Toronto for a while as he was about to reveal much to the Crown. In 1980, when Kirby told Lenti he was to testify against the Mafia figures who employed him as a hitman, Lenti fled to Italy where he lived for the next two years. However, prominent Canadian journalist Jerry Langton stated in 2006 that Lenti had been booted out of the Loners and had left for Italy until "tempers cooled". When he return to Canada, he joined the Satan's Choice Toronto chapter until leaving in 1984.

At some point during the 1980s the Loners established a chapter in Saskatoon, Saskatchewan. However, it would "Patch-Over" to the Alberta-based Rebels MC. This was seen as ironic because both founders of the club had started a Toronto chapter of the Rebels only to leave it and start the Loners. Now they had had one of their chapters patched over by the very club they left.

The Loners International President, Jimmy Raso would also eventually begin to expand overseas, establishing chapters in the United States as well as additional countries in Europe, with his first European chapter opening on 24 December 1985. By the 1990s, the Loners had chapters in Woodbridge, Toronto, Vaughan, Richmond Hill, Windsor, London, Amherstburg, Hamilton, and Chatham-Kent. Unusually for a Canadian outlaw biker club by the mid-1980s, the Loners had chapters abroad with one in Portugal and several in Italy, having chapters in Naples, Messina, Salerno, Reggio Calabria, Brolo, Avellino and Isernia. The Loners were a successful club under Raso and Lenti's leadership despite the way that other clubs predictably mocked the Loners as "the Losers". By the late 1980s, the Loners were the third largest motorcycle club in Ontario, being exceeded only by the Outlaws and Satan's Choice. Langton wrote that Lenti was also personally successful in two "industries bikers tend to admire-a stripper/escort talent agency and a tow truck firm".

In 1990, several members of the Satan's Choice Motorcycle Club patched-over and joined the rival Loners. At this point the Satan's Choice had begun to see the Loners as a serious threat. Over time, the Satan's Choice had lost dozens of members to the Loners. Prominent members included, Frank Lenti, Gennaro Raso and Brian Beaucage, one of the inmates involved killings during the 1971 Kingston Penitentiary riot. Though Beaucage's membership in the Loners was short lived, as by the late 1980s, he had returned to the Satan's Choice, where he became a member of the Kitchener chapter and later its Oshawa chapter.

These patch-overs caused tensions to run high between the two clubs, which would reach a fever pitch with the killing of Brian Beaucage. On March 3, 1991. Full-Patch member of the Satan's Choice, Brian Beaucage had spent the night devoted to drinking, hard drugs and watching pornography with his girlfriend in a Toronto rooming house. In his last years, Beaucage had become addicted to heroin and several members of Satan's Choice, such as Wayne Kelly were planning his murder due to constant issues. That night, Beaucage received a visit (most likely a drug deal) from a full-patch member of the Loners, Frank Passarelli. Eventually Beaucage ordered Passarelli out of the room so that he could have sex with his girlfriend. The rude manner in which he did this offended Passarelli, who after a verbal altercation told him: "No one is going to ask me to leave for some girl". Later that same night, he was beheaded in his bed by Passarelli. His body was not found until the next day, being partially devoured by the dogs belonging to another boarder. At the time, the police expressed no surprise about Beaucage's murder, saying he was a violent and disagreeable man, and the only surprise was that it took this long for somebody to saw off his head with a kitchen knife. The gruesome nature of Beaucage's murder led it to take on a legendary reputation within biker circles, being known inaccurately as the "Fifty Whacks with an Ax". This series of events saw a significant increase in the rivalry between the two clubs which would later spread into open conflict in 1995.

During the 1990s, Hells Angels from Quebec would frequently visit the Loners. In June 1993, the Hells Angels led by their national president Walter Stadnick hosted a party in Wasaga Beach that was attended by all of the Ontario biker gangs except the Outlaws and Satan's Choice. Lenti and the Loners were guests of honor at the party. Stadnick tried to persuade Lenti to have the Loners "patch over" to the Hells Angels, an offer Lenti and Raso refused. However, a working relationship was established between the two groups for a time with the Loners agreeing to buy their narcotics from the Angels. The Hells Angels offered Lenti and Raso further chances to "patch over" several times in 1993 and 1994, but they declined, with Lenti instead offering Stadnick a chance to join the Loners.

Stadnick was unhappy about the way that the prominent Ontario biker gangs such as Satan's Choice, the Loners, and the Para-Dice Riders all refused his offers to join the Hells Angels. In the fall of 1993, it was decided that several members of the Rockers and other puppet gangs would move to Ontario to set up a new puppet gang. The Demons Keepers had four chapters and we're supposed to flood the Ontario market with cheap drugs to try and cause instability. However the Demons Keepers would quickly collapse.

== War with Satan's Choice ==
Frank Lenti would later be expelled from the Loners for the second time in 1994, which was said to either be due to allegations of him stealing from the club. or the fact that his temper was apparently getting out of control. Upon being expelled from the Loners, Lenti would go on to found a new outlaw motorcycle club, the Diablos. Lenti used his home as the Diablos clubhouse, which was located only a half block away from the Loners' clubhouse on Kipling Avenue in Woodbridge, this was considered a direct provocation. The Loners clubhouse was so close, it forced intimidated members of the Diablos to take an alternate route to their clubhouse. Satan's Choice agreed to sell drugs to the Diablos and offered support club status with the possibility of joining Satan's Choice, which angered the Loners. The Loners came into conflict with the Diablos in the summer of 1995, who called upon Satan's Choice for aid.

The Satan's Choice made a firm alliance with the Diablos, led by Loners exile, Frank Lenti. Langton wrote: "So desperate were the big biker gangs for every square inch of southern Ontario – especially prime real estate like Woodbridge – the Diablos were immediately courted". The narcotics trade in the Greater Toronto Area had grown very intense, and even the small territory controlled by the Diablos made them worth aligning with. On July 18, 1995, a member of the Diablos threw a homemade bomb at a tow truck owned by a Loner. Two days later, two Diablos were injured when they were both shot by a member of the Loners Woodbridge chapter. The Satan's Choice would enter the conflict on behalf of their ally. Brawls between the Loners and Satan's Choice became common in the summer of 1995, causing injuries to multiple people. Satan's Choice ambushed three Loners in Woodbridge, injuring them. Several businesses belonging to members of both clubs, such a tattoo parlor, a motorcycle repair shop and a bar were bombed.

On August 1, 1995, the Toronto chapter clubhouse of Satan's Choice on Kintyre Avenue – which was backing the Diablos – was stuck by a rocket fired from a military rocket launcher by Loners members. The Canadian journalist, Yves Lavigne wrote the explosion caused by the rocket "tore a large in the door and blew windows out of three neighboring houses, but did not injure the bikers inside the building". Later the same night at 3: 35 am, Satan's Choice tossed a bomb through the window of Pluto's Place tattoo parlor owned by a Loner on Lake Shore Boulevard, setting off a fire that caused $50,000 in damages. The next day three Molotov cocktails were tossed at Bazooka Jacks bar in Markham, Ontario, a Satan's Choice associated bar that was popular with members. On August 16, 1995, Satan's Choice struck back for the attack on their clubhouse by firing a rocket – again from a military rocket launcher – at the Loners Woodbridge chapter clubhouse. A Loner told the media it was not Satan's Choice that fired the rocket as he claimed: "Looks like the cops have stolen our rocket launcher". Canadian authorities would raid the Loners clubhouse due to this. They seized several illegal weapons but what unable to make any arrests.

Despite the lucid headlines in the newspapers, Satan's Choice as a whole was not committed to an all-out struggle against the Loners. Officer Lorne Campbell made an agreement with the combatants that all of York Region north of Highway 7 was a "no war zone". On 25 August 1995, Lenti, the president of the Diablos, was nearly killed by a bomb planted by Loners in his car. The incident left him in hospital for months. The explosion had removed his left butt cheek from his body, This earned him the title "half-assed biker", which he detested. The Diablos collapsed without Lenti, and after attacks on two more members, their territory and membership were forcibly absorbed by the Loners. With the Diablos gone and Lenti in the hospital by the end of 1995, the conflict ended with the Loners and Satan's Choice agreeing to peaceful terms. The war in Toronto had seen the Hells Angels change tune temporarily to support the Loners against Satan's Choice. Stadnick was upset with the Satan's Choice over the war, but did not wish to keep Satan's Choice as his enemies. Afterwards he set out to rebuild his damaged relationships with the Choice leaders. While relations between the Loners and Hells Angels would degrade in the years to come.

Following the war, the Satan's Choice was subject to a large police crackdown in Ontario, this would cause tensions between them and the Loners to decrease. The Hells Angels saw it as a competition of who was fit to help them expand into Ontario. These police raids put an end to that, as the Satan's Choice was in bad condition. This caused the Hells Angels to increase their partnership with the Loners, who they were already supplying drugs. Detective Len Isnor stated, "The Satan's Choice were never the big guys, they were nickel and dime. The Loners were always Stadnick's favorites." The Hells Angels continued to court Loners, there was even talks of the Loners becoming a support club for the Angels in Canada and Italy, this unfortunately for the Angels would never occur.

== Split and growth ==
After emerging victorious in the Toronto Biker War of 1995, the Loners remained a prominent biker gang. This continued until early 1997, when the Loners split into two factions. A split emerged between Jimmy Raso and Frank Grano. The pro-Hells Angel faction led by Grano joined the Para-Dice Riders while a rump remained under Raso. The split a breach with the Hells Angels. Stadnick had cut off the Loners supply to narcotics. Without a supply of drugs from the Hells Angels, the journalist Jerry Langton that the Loners "faded into obscurity. Bikers gangs without a steady supply of drugs to sell generally don't make headlines". This was due to the Loners Italian roots and at times they would subcontract for them.

By late 1999, the Loners had built up moderate strength, beside Nomads they had chapters in Richmond Hill, Woodbridge, Vaughan, Toronto, Hamilton, London, Windsor, and Amherstburg. In June 1999, had established its Chatham chapter (based near St. Thomas), when they absorbed the Annihilators Motorcycle Club led by Wayne Kellestine and Giovanni Muscedere. Kellestine did not like how the Angels had treated the Loners under Raso. He was also adamantly against joining the Hells Angels, but he also did not want to align with the Outlaws, so he chose to join the Loners. This merging of the Annihilators along with other clubs into the Loners was done in an attempt to increase the clubs membership and strength to deal with the incoming threat of the Hells Angels. One Loner, Irish immigrant Glenn "Wrongway" Atkinson, was heard to remarking the low quality of the Annihilators after meeting Kellestine and his group for the first time: "Can you believe the type of people we're attracting?" Unlike most Canadian outlaw bikers who were barely literate, Atkinson was a bibliophile who especially loved the work of James Joyce, which led some other bikers to consider him strange. Atkinson was well regarded as a diplomat. He had connections with many group in Ireland, including the Irish Alliance.

In 1999, the Loners' International secretary Glenn "Wrongway" Atkinson and another full-patch Loner, Wayne Connor were sent to Ireland to try persuade the biker clubs of Irish Alliance to join the Canadian Loners, an offer that was respected but refused. Atkinson told Peter Edwards that there were many parallels between the world of Irish politics and Canadian outlaw biking, and to grow up following Irish politics was the best preparation for Canadian outlaw biking. Atkinson stated that both Canadian outlaw biking and Irish politics were based on a sense of identity formed around a sense of rebellion, fierce clannish loyalties and a professed strongly held moral code, while at the same time being inhabited by strange, cartoonish men given to making outlandish statements who frequently engaged in sordid intrigue and betrayed their friends, as greed and ambition outweighed their professed moral code.

=== Ontario Biker War ===
From 1999 to 2002, the club was a participant in the Ontario Biker War. One of the members of the London chapter of the Loners, Jimmy Coates, had a brother, John Coates, who was an associate of the Hells Angels' Sherbrooke chapter. John Coates was a 6'7 man who weighted 300 pounds while younger brother Jimmy was not as large, but still intimidating. Through his brother, Jimmy Coates opened a secret pipeline for buying drugs from Sherbrooke. The president of the St. Thomas chapter, Wayne Kellestine, like Bernie Guindon was a firm Canadian nationalist and was adamantly against having the Loners join the Hells Angels, as he didn't want to "answer to a club based in another country". He once even pistol-whipped a member of his chapter who expressed a desire to join the Angels. Together, the Coates brothers worked to encourage a mutiny in the area against Kellestine, with the promise of joining the Angels as the reward. On 22 October 1999, an assassination attempt was made against Kellestine as he stopped in his truck for a red light in his hometown of Iona Station. A car driven by Philippe "Philbilly" Gastonguay of the Angels' Sherbrooke chapter, together with a pro-Angel Loner, David "Dirty" McLeish of the St. Thomas chapter, pulled up and one of the two men in the car opened fire with a shotgun, spraying Kellestine's truck with bullets He would survive this attempt unscathed. To the authorities in Ontario it had been made clear that the Loners and Hells Angels were now at war. The Outlaws would also join the conflict, fighting in the cities of London and Hamilton.

In April 2000, Montreal Rockers member, Dany Kane traveled to Toronto on the orders of Hells Angel, David Carroll. He was there to meet the leaders of the Para-Dice Riders gang for another of Carroll's murder plots. Kane in a report stated that Carroll wanted him to kill Gennaro Raso, the international president of the Loners Motorcycle Club, as part of a bid to have the Para-Dice Riders join the Hells Angels. On 19 April 2000, Kane met in Toronto several Para-Dice Riders to discuss who he was to kill besides Raso. Kane reported that Carroll had devised a plan under which Kane would use his bomb-making skills to build a powerful bomb to destroy the Loners' clubhouse in Woodbridge with the aim of killing the entire chapter. Kane, who was an informant, sabotaged his mission by encouraging the Para-Dice Riders under the influence of alcohol to speak very loudly in public at a Toronto bar about the murder plot, which led Carroll to declare with disgust that the Para-Dice Riders were "idiots" as now the murder plot could not go forward.

In May 2000, Ontario Provincial Police in conjunction with local law enforcement dealt a blow to the Loners ability to fight the Angels. They launched Operation Hilltop against the club. It saw over 150 law enforcement officers raided around 15 locations in Ontario, many in the Greater Toronto Area, targeting chapters of the Loners Motorcycle Club in Woodbridge, Richmond Hill, Toronto, Vaughan and Windsor. The 6-month sting project led to the seizures of drugs and guns, the arrests of 21 members of the Loners and several associates, this included Raso, president Loners and leader of the clubs Richmond Hill chapter, which at the time acted as its mother chapter. During this period authorities stated that the Loners had controlled most of the drug distribution North of Toronto and in York Region and their territory extended from the Greater Toronto Area thought to London and to Hamilton. Collectively the group faced more than 250 criminal charges, with around 75% of those charges being narcotics related. With the rest involved mostly charges relating to weapons, the distribution of weapons and theft. The narcotics seized included large amounts of cocaine, hash, marijuana and mushrooms. Their street value is estimated to be about $1.5-million (modern equivalent of $2.6 million). This caused temporary issues within the Loners Motorcycle Club.

The Rock Machine Motorcycle Club, the club was currently engaged with the Hells Angels in the bloody Quebec Biker War that was occurring at the same period. They had begun to establish themselves in Ontario during 1999. By 2000, the Loners Motorcycle Club aligned themselves with fellow Canadian motorcycle club. RCMP Staff Sergeant, Jean-Pierre Levesque also commented on the situation in Ontario.

"New alliances have changed the balance of power in the province. The only gang affiliated with the Hells Angels in Ontario is the Para-Dice Riders. The Vagabonds and Satan's Choice are apparently neutral, while the Outlaws, Loners and now the Rock Machine have traditionally rivalled the Hells Angels. The Hells Angels to enter in Ontario -- want total control, nobody escapes them. By setting up alliances, other gangs are better able to resist a takeover of their drug territories by the Hells Angels.

The Loners held a party in Toronto that was attended by dozens of "machinists", as the Rock Machine are known in outlaw biker circles. On December 1, 2000, the Rock Machine Motorcycle Club became an official probationary club of the Bandidos. At the ceremony in on Jane Street in Vaughan, Ontario. Bikers from the Rock Machine, Bandidos and Loners gathered at a local banquet hall. As 45 members of the Rock Machine Ontario receive their probationary patches, Rock Machine allies, the Loners Motorcycle Club provided security for the event.

In December 2000, the Hells Angels entered Ontario by "patching over" 168 members from a number of Ontario biker gangs. When it came to the patch-over in Ontario, the Loners were not given an invitation to join the Hells Angels, as by this point the latter was considered an enemy. The only ones who had were the former Loners who had joined the Para-Dice Riders or the ones from London who participated in the attempted coup.

On January 17, 2001, Bandidos Canada national vice-president, Alain Brunette travelled with US Bandido, Edward Winterhalder to Toronto to meet with the new Bandidos chapter there. The Bandidos Toronto (North) chapter had patched over from the Rock Machine in February 2001. This made sense, as the Loners maintained long-time relationships with Bandidos in Europe.

On May 22, 2001. After a rift between now imprisoned Loners international president, Gennaro Raso and Toronto president, have the Loners ot join the Bandidos. This included himself, plus eleven other members of the Loners Toronto chapter. Some members from Richmond Hill, along with the entire memberships of the St. Thomas and Amherstburg chapters. The Woodbridge chapter of the Loners continued to operate as the Mother chapter. Most members of the London chapter of Loners had chosen to join the Hells Angels instead. Jimmy Coates became the first president of the Angels' London probationary chapter in 2001. Most of the others members in the new Hells Angels London chapter were also former members of the Loners.

=== After the conflict ===
In 2007, several members of the Loners in Ontario and Western Canada joined the California-based Mongols Motorcycle Club. When the Mongols Canada collapsed soon after, these former Loners would be involved in the reconstruction of the Rock Machine Motorcycle Club. The Loners would bounce back from these setbacks. By the late 2000s, they had reopened some of their chapters and they had established new chapters in Lindsay, Peterborough, Sarnia, totaling 8 in Ontario. They had also expanded outside of Ontario, establishing chapters in Alberta, Saskatchewan, and Nova Scotia and several other counties in Europe and Oceania. In 2013, the Loners would establish a chapter in rural Stratford, Ontario. A popular area for the manufacturer of methamphetamine. Producing such drugs emits a foul odor, so motorcycle clubs will set up manufacturing sites in rural communities where the population is less dense.

Despite issues in the past the Loners Motorcycle Club has as seen a period of success and growth since the early 2000s. As of 2023, the club is estimated to have around 1,000 members worldwide and they have established over 65 chapters in 13 countries. The Loners, like many many other 1% motorcycle clubs, maintain that they are a club of motorcycle enthusiasts. Any members that commit crimes do so free of the clubs instruction or knowledge. These claims are heavily disputed by law enforcement and intelligence agencies from several nations.

"The Loners MC has regained strength following several episodes of departures and betrayals within the club. Over the past 10 years, the club has experienced a significant increase in membership and is present in several countries around the world and its influence has never been stronger."

Glenn "Wrongway" Atkinson had been a longtime and prominent member of the Loners Motorcycle Club in Ontario. However he decided to become a member of the Bandidos Motorcycle Club, when the some Loners from the Amherstburg and Richmond Hill chapters along with all members of London chapter patched over to the Bandidos in May, 2001. He eventually rose to the rank of national secretary, but had decided to leave the Bandidos in October 2004. He stated that his reasons for doing so was that the Bandidos had completely lost control under the leadership of the former Annihilators, Giovanni Muscedere and Wayne Kellestine. Muscedere had lost contact with reality, and had become short-sighted and ill-tempered; Kellestine was dangerous, and another club member, Michael Sandham, seemed like a shady character to Atkinson. Eventually Atkinson rejoined the Loners after the Shedden massacre. He would eventually regain the rank of national secretary of the Loners Canada.

=== Conflict with the Vagos ===
The Vagos Motorcycle Club, which is one of the largest motorcycle clubs in America, attempted to expand North into Canada in 2007. Their plan was to set up their first chapter in Toronto, Ontario, but the chapter fell apart before it really got going. By October 2011, They had returned to Toronto, the Vagos Motorcycle Club established a new probationary chapter in Peterborough, Ontario, by patching-over 9 members of the Rock Machine. The chapter would become full-patch Vagos in October 2012. The Loners Motorcycle Club had possessed a chapter in Peterborough for sometime so this caused some territorial tension. In mid 2012, it was announced by the Loners that former Satan's Choice and Bandidos member, Robert "Bob" Pammett had been kicked out of the Loners Motorcycle Club in "bad standing" after a unanimous vote by the club's Peterborough chapter. Pammett was a close associate of club founders, Frank Lenti and Gennaro Raso. He had left the Satan's Choice in the 1980s to join the growing Loners, where he remained an influential member unil he joined the Bandidos in 2001, as a member of their Toronto chapter. After the collapse of the Bandidos in Canada, Pammett would rejoin the Loners in 2007. He had a decent amount of influence within Peterborough's underworld so police feared that this could cause tensions.

The Loners released several statements issuing warnings during the Vagos Motorcycle Club's setup in Peterborough that left authorities concerned. The Loners were determined to compete the American-based club that exile Pammett was now aligning with. They also stated that Peterborough was Loners territory and they would ready to defend it.

"The club is a strong brotherhood and will be steadfast in remaining in Peterborough, Robert Pammett AKA Peterborough Bob is no longer a member of or affiliated with the Loners MC and is out in bad standings!! Peterborough is remaining a Loners MC Canada B&W stronghold and will always be a Loners MC town. All others tread lightly!"

Pammett used his influence to a split in the Loners Peterborough chapter during mid 2012, which led to a defection of at least four of its members to the newly formed Vagos. This caused several altercations between the two groups. Including the defectors, an unnamed spokesperson told The Peterborough Examiner that the chapter is at least 23 full patch members and four prospects strong. They had acquired a clubhouse on the corner of Park Street and Perry Street (285 Perry St), which was in close proximity to the Loners clubhouse located at 126 Park Street, which in the outlaw biker world is seen as a direct sign of provocation.

In July 2012, a 47-year-old member of the Loners Motorcycle Club was sent to hospital with a broken arm after being attacked by several former Loners, who were now affiliated with the Vagos. The incident occurred on Park Street, near a set of railroad tracks just down the road from the Loners Peterborough clubhouse, Peterborough authorities arrested four individuals in connection with the incident, three of whom we're previous members of the Loners, now in “bad standing” with the club. Garry Coppins, Chris Graham and Pierre Aragon, all former Loners were hit with multitude of charges including, assault, assault with a weapon, endangering the public, aggravated assault and uttering threats. A former Loners hang-around, Shane Gardiner was also charged with aggravated assault. The local authorities announced they would be keeping an eye on the situation and expressed their concern, saying that outlaw biker activity in the area is common but having two clubs in the same city that are not on good terms always has the possibility to spiral into a much larger conflict.

In late August, the Vagos clubhouse located on the corner of Park and Perry Streets, was firebombed by Molotov cocktails causing minor damage. A current Vagos member, Bob Pammett's property was also subject to arson, however little damage was caused to his truck as it seems the Molotov cocktail missed. Police were not able to confirm who was responsible for the arsons, but they assumed it was the Loners based on the ongoing issues between the groups. Staff Sgt. Larry Charmley stated:"Pammett's crew and the Loners haven't resolved their differences in the past few months." Police seized the remains of the cocktail and are still investigating. By late October, the Loners Peterborough chapter had increased its strength. By absorbing the local Vigilantes Motorcycle Club, which had acted as their support club, this was done in a patch over ceremony that happened in September 2012. This increased the chapters numbers to over 30 members, giving them a significant advantage over the Vagos.

After this the Vagos Peterborough clubhouse was subject to a massive arson attack. The inside of the building was almost completely "gutted" by the flames. Authorities presume that they will have to tear the building down due to extensive damage, even causing portions of the roof to collapse. No one was present inside at the time but it took firefighters several hours to put out the blaze. The Loners-Vagos conflict would come to a close due to the patch over of the Vagos Peterborough chapter to the Outlaws Motorcycle Club in 2015. A club that had historically good to moderate relations with the Loners.

== Chapters/charters worldwide ==
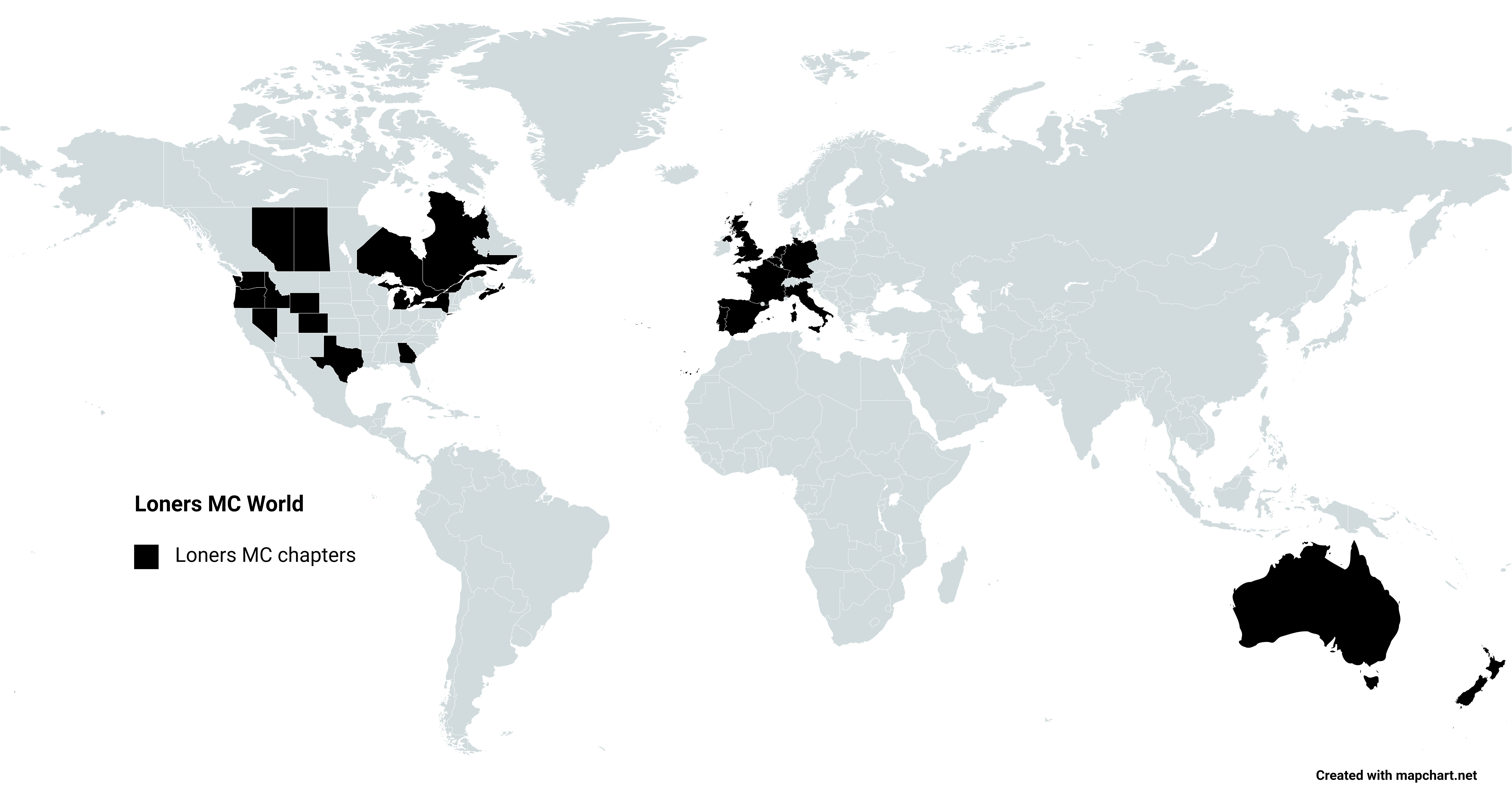
Loners MC World

=== Canada (18) ===
- World-wide/National
  - LMC International Nomads chapter
  - LMC Canada Nomads chapter
- Alberta
  - LMC Edmonton chapter
  - LMC Edmonton North chapter (Frozen)
- British Columbia
  - LMC West Crew chapter
- New Brunswick
  - LMC Fredericton chapter
  - LMC Moncton chapter
  - LMC Woodstock chapter
- Ontario
  - LMC Woodbridge chapter (Mother chapter)
  - LMC Richmond Hill chapter
  - LMC Stratford chapter
  - LMC Hamilton chapter
  - LMC Peterborough chapter
  - LMC Lindsay chapter
  - LMC Windsor chapter
  - LMC Brockville chapter
  - LMC Toronto chapter
  - LMC Halton Hills chapter
  - LMC Cornwall chapter
  - LMC London chapter
  - LMC Bracebridge chapter
  - LMC Amherstburg chapter

(Frozen)

  - LMC Vaughan chapter (Frozen)
  - LMC Chatham chapter (Relocated)
  - LMC St. Thomas chapter (Relocated)
- Quebec
  - LMC Montreal chapter (Frozen)
- Saskatchewan
  - LMC Saskatoon chapter
  - LMC Swift Current chapter
  - LMC Regina chapter (Frozen)

=== International/continental (2) ===
- World-wide (1)
  - Loners MC International Nomads
- Europe (1)
  - Loners MC European Nomads chapter

=== Other chapters (37) ===
- Australia (1)
  - LMC Australia chapter (Sydney)
  - LMC Australia chapter (Melbourne)
- Belgium (1)
  - LMC Belgium chapter (Brussels)
- England (2)
  - LMC England chapter (London)
  - LMC England Nomads chapter
- France (5)
  - LMC Auxonne chapter (Côte d'Or) & Support Ditry Dosen chapter
  - LMC Dole chapter (Jura)
  - LMC Lons le Saunier chapter (Jura)
  - LMC Saint Claude chapter (Jura)
  - LMC France Nomads chapter
- Germany (2)
  - LMC Germany chapter (Berlin)
  - LMC Germany Nomads chapter
- Italy (11)
  - LMC Verona chapter
  - LMC Massa chapter
  - LMC Bologna chapter
  - LMC Firenze chapter
  - LMC Messina chapter
  - LMC Salerno chapter
  - LMC Reggio chapter
  - LMC Calabria chapter
  - LMC Avellino chapter
  - LMC Isernia chapter
  - LMC Nomads Italy
  - LMC Naples chapter (Frozen)
  - LMC Brolo chapter (Frozen)
- Netherlands (1)
  - LMC Holland chapter (Rotterdam)
- New Zealand (1)
  - LMC New Zealand chapter (Wellington)
- Portugal
  - LMC Portugal chapter (Frozen)
- Spain (2)
  - LMC Spain chapter (Barcelona)
  - LMC Canary Islands chapter
- United States (11)
  - LMC Nevada chapter (Las Vegas)
  - LMC Colorado chapter
  - LMC Washington chapter
  - LMC Oregon chapter
  - LMC Michigan chapter
  - LMC Idaho chapter
  - LMC Rock Springs chapter (Wyoming)
  - LMC Casper chapter (Wyoming)
  - LMC Tennessee chapter
  - LMC Nomads USA
  - LMC Kentucky chapter (Frozen)
  - LMC Georgia chapter (Frozen)
  - LMC New York chapter (Frozen)
  - LMC Texas chapter (Frozen)
- Indonesia (1)

== Criminal allegations and incidents ==
Note: See Early History and Split and growth above for older incidents and crimes

=== Canada ===
The Loners Vaughan chapter clubhouse near Toronto, Ontario, was raided by law enforcement in 1998, where authorities uncovered a pet African lion named "Woody" being kept in a tidy 25-metre by 25-metre pen. As a result, the club was charged with violating a King Township bylaw against keeping exotic pets. In 2001, the Loners Vaughan chapter were still involved in a legal battle to try and keep their mascot. The Vaughan chapter clubhouse was eventually sold and its members transferred to other chapters.

In May 2000, Ontario Provincial Police in conjunction with local law enforcement launched Operation Hilltop. Over 150 law enforcement officers raided 13 locations in Ontario, many in the GTA targeting chapters of the Loners Motorcycle Club. The 6-month sting project led to the seizures of drugs and guns, the arrests of 21 members of the Loners and several associates, this included the president of the clubs Richmond Hill chapter, which at the time acted as its mother chapter. During this period authorities stated that the Loners had controlled most of the drug distribution North of Toronto and in York Region and their territory extended from the Greater Toronto Area thought to London and to Hamilton. Collectively the group faced more than 250 criminal charges, with around 75% of those charges narcotics being narcotics related. With the rest involved mostly charges relating to weapons, the distribution of weapons and theft. The narcotics seized included large amounts of cocaine, hash, marijuana and mushrooms. Their street value is estimated to be about $1.5-million (modern equivalent of $2.6 million).

On June 18, 2012. An associate of the Loners Toronto chapter, John "Johnny Maserati" Raposo was shot and killed on the patio of the Sicilian, a cafe in Little Italy, Toronto. A second bystander was injured. The restaurant was described by an organized crime investigator, "The Sicilian has been a popular gathering place for many in Little Italy for years, including known Mafia members and associates. The cafe has been noted by investigators as one of many locations chosen for meetings between mob figures who like good food while they whisper over business." John Raposo was the cousin of former Loners Toronto member Luis Raposo, who was killed during the Shedden massacre. John Raposo had come close to joining the Loners in the 1990s, he chose not to but remained in association. He was considered by some a gangster and was connected with the Montreal Mafia. He was a close friend of Eddie "Hurricane" Melo, a boxer who acted as an enforcer for the Montreal mafia, they grew up in same neighbourhood together. He was also a close friend with a longtime Loner member known as "Joe the Meatman," who worked as a local butcher. "He was one of his "Joe the Meatman's" guys downtown," a former Loner mentioned to the Toronto Star. There was also a outpour of support from the local community where Raposo lived.

On 18 April 2013. Around 90 police officers, along with OPP and the biker enforcement unit, performed 12 pre-dawn raids targeting the Loners Motorcycle Club in the York Region, Toronto and Caledon. The authorities seized assortment of drugs, gang paraphernalia and a loaded assault rifle. This included large amounts of marijuana packaged for distribution and thousands of Oxycodone, Percodan and morphine pills were also seized. Four full-patch members of the Loners and nine associates of the club were initially charged with either the distribution of narcotics or firearms. This included then acting national secretary of the Loners MC Canada, Glenn Atkinson.

By August 2014, authorities were forced to drop several charges due to inconclusive evidence, some were later acquitted when the search warrants were dismissed by judges in 2016. Law enforcement was greatly criticized as only two men would actually receive charges. Now former Nation secretary, Glenn Atkinson would pled guilty to three counts of trafficking narcotics and was sentenced to nine months of house arrest. The other was a Loners associate named Ricardo Silva, who was forced to pay a $200 fine for possession of marijuana. Regardless law enforcement tried to put a positive spin on their operation, with Det. Sgt. MacIntyre stating,

"Locally, this is a decent-sized dent,” he said. “It disrupts drug trafficking going on here and in the GTA. They (the Loners) have a portion of the market and do work in conjunction with other elements of organized crime, including the Italian Mafia."

He also added that there were currently between 50 and 60 members of the Loners Motorcycle Club operating throughout the Greater Toronto area.

In mid 2016 co-founder of the Loners MC, Gennaro "Jim" Raso, was charged with threatening death and discharging a firearm recklessly. The 15 charges were dropped in 2017. Also in August 2016. A member of the Loners, Micheal Raso, Gennaro Raso's son, was allegedly involved in a drive-by shooting of the residence of Chief Financial Officer for the Dream Corporation(multi-million dollar Caribbean-based casino company), Ed Kremblewski, who was a minor witness in the attempted murder case against Antonio Carbone, who was a majority shareholder in Dream Corp. Carbone was an entrepreneur from Toronto that was involved in the casino business along with his brother, he was also found guilty of firebombing a rival's Jaguar on December 1, 2014. The vehicle belonged to Dream Casino manager Fernando Baez, and Antonio stated "Dream was estimated at $540 million so we're talking about the largest ... conspiracy in the Dominican Republic."

Both brothers had been involved in a "series of lawsuits and countersuits revolving around the ownership and control of the company." Accusing them of attempting to defraud the Carbones brothers of their assets since the beginning of the partnership, Antonio was arrested on attempted murder in January 2015, he was imprisoned in the Dominican Republic and waited for his trial for two years. In total, Antonio was being sued in Canada for defrauding an investor of around $100 million, in the Dominican he was charged with stock manipulation and attempted murder.

In mid 2016, before Antonio's conviction it was alleged that Francesco Carbone had hired the Loners Motorcycle Club to put pressure on the witnesses and members of Dream Corp. Bullets were fired at Ed Kremblewski's home while his family was present, during the same time he and his sons were receiving "threatening phone calls". Kremblewski launched a civil lawsuit against Gennaro Raso, president of the Loners, his son Michael and Francesco Carbone, the brother of Antonio. Kremblewski claims that he and his family faced "threats of maiming and death" if the charges against Antonio were not dropped and that his "son would be shot in the head, his daughter would be maimed and killed and that his elderly parents would be assaulted and killed".

The lawsuit states, that the brothers had been using the Loners chapter in the Dominican to contact one another, Kremblewski also alleges that Francesco Carbone was behind the intimidation campaign carried out by the Loners MC and that Francesco Carbone even provided $18,000 in Canadian currency to Michael Raso to bribe a Dominican judicial official in an attempt to have his brother Antonio released on bail. The claims in the lawsuit against the Raso's and Francesco Carbone remain unproven.

On January 30, 2019. The Loners Cornwall chapter would release a statement following an article produced about them by the Cornwall Standard Freeholders, they addressed the criticisms and accusations against their group that had not been proven at the time. They also invited journalists to come learn more about them on their international run. The Loners official spokesmen commented,

"The Loners Motorcycle Club honours and respects our Club Founders for maintaining our old school values and love for motorcycling since 1978. Their integrity and loyalty to the club, its members and the respect that they have shown throughout the motorcycle world has enabled us to build a brotherhood like no other worldwide, not just in Cornwall. To become a full patch member and finish the probationary period it takes a minimum 2 years but can take much longer. All members must be well versed in, and must defend, the Canadian Constitution and it's [sic] Charter of Rights and Freedoms. All members must also strictly adhere to the Loners MC Constitution. Nowhere in our Constitution does it allow or support the use of narcotics or the sale of the same. The life style of a 1% MC is much stricter then you can imagine and is not for everyone. It's well known in our world that it is harder to keep your patch than it is to get it. - Magoo: Loners Motorcycle Club Spokesman, President Loners MC Cornwall chapter"

From early 2018 until 2020, the Cornwall chapter of the Loners MC had been operating out of an unmarked clubhouse in Cornwall, Ontario, just off of Montreal Road. It is alleged here that the group was involved in drug trafficking. Ontario Provincial Police launched an investigation against the Loners Motorcycle Club. After months of using various tactics that included sting operations, the investigation culminated in a raid on clubhouse located on Prince Arthur Street in Cornwall. A large amount of drugs were seized from the property, including purple fentanyl.

In February 2021, a Full-Patch member of the Loners Richmond Hill chapter was killed in an assumed narcotics deal gone wrong. In mid 2021, Toronto Police announced that they had raided a business associated with the Loners Toronto chapter. This resulted in the arrests of four Full-patch members of the Loners Motorcycle Club and two associates. Toronto chapter members, Ricardo Silva, Jason Thompson, Kevin Palmer-Konye, and Richard Robert, were arrested along with two associates Melonie Barcalos, and Christina Silva. Police also confiscated 258 grams of cocaine and $20,000 in cash.

On April 1, 2022. Ottawa Police arrested a member of the Loners "Nomads Canada" chapter. Authorities seized 60 grams of cocaine along with a "significant amount" of oxycodone tablets, psilocybin. They also confiscated two ballistic bullet proof vests, a semi auto .22-calibre rifle, a 9-mm rifle with a modified barrel, several magazines, ammunition and more than $1,800 in Canadian and American currencies. Police had also temporarily confiscated the "cuts" of Loners MC Nomads chapter belonging to the individual that was arrested and a Dirty Dozen MC "cut", which is one of the Loners support clubs in Canada.

On July 6, 2023. Ontario Provincial Police raided the South Ottawa home of a second member of the Loners Nomads Canada chapter, Eric St. Louis. He along with an associate were arrested and were charged for possession of narcotics with the intent to distribute and "possession of property obtained by crime over $5,000." Police also seized cocaine, one leather vest with Loners patches and a white leather plate carrier that included ballistic panels that also had Loners patches, both of which belonged to the member. Authorities also seized Loners Motorcycle Club jewelry, a Loners branded knapsack, a vehicle and $11,000 in Canadian currency.

=== Conflict with the Outlaws ===
On August 25, 2022. Three members of the Outlaws Motorcycle Club were arrested and charged in what authorities referred to as "linked to ongoing tensions between the Outlaws Motorcycle Club and the Loners Motorcycle Club." Kingston and Brockville Police made arrests and confiscated firearms. The Loners recently established its Brockville chapter after they relocated from Cornwall, Ontario. The Loners had been forced to temporarily freeze their Cornwall chapter due to increase police pressure in 2020. In 2023, Loners Motorcycle Club resumed operation in Cornwall as well, with the group presumably reopening its Cornwall chapter. This would only increase tensions with the Outlaws in the area would lead to several violent incidents in the mid-2023.

On July 8, 2023, around 30 members of the Loners and the Outlaws were involved in a targeted altercation in the area of Vincent Massey Drive and 14th Street in Cornwall, Ontario. Three people were injured, two members of the Loners were stabbed and a member of the Outlaws was shot. But their injuries were not considered life-threatening. Initially 5 people had been arrested and charged. But that number was later increased to 9 people arrested and received charges including aggravated assault, assault with a weapon, robbery and possession of a concealed weapons. Two days later on July 10, 2023, a large fire broke out around 2:00am at the Outlaws Brockville clubhouse located at 109 Perth Street in Brockville, Ontario. Due to the fuel inside, the blaze was so intense that it caused damage to 17 other buildings surrounding the clubhouse, which was completely destroyed by the flames. Nobody was injured or killed in the fires. Citizens were forced to flee their homes, an estimated $4 million in damage was done to the clubhouse and surrounding area, with investigators dragging items and burnt out motorcycles belonging to the Outlaws out of the wreckage. Police are investigating and the fire has been deemed suspicious, they don't have any suspects, but they believe the Loners may be involved in the arson. The Toronto Sun reported that a day later the Loners Brockville clubhouse was subject to some form of arson.

On July 14, 2023. Cornwall police conducted eight raids in the city targeting the two groups. Further individuals were arrested bringing the total to nine, police also confiscated multiple weapons including two loaded pistols. The acting Chief of Police, Vincent Foy addressed the concerns of the public, stating that their safety was the police's greatest concern and that they would continue to keep an eye on the situation. These events came as a shock to law enforcement and criminal experts. The Outlaws and Loners had historically been allies, especially in Canada. During the late 1990s, the Outlaws supplied narcotics to the Loners and the two groups were allied against the Hells Angels in the Ontario Biker War. During 2010, the Outlaws planned on setting up a chapter in Peterborough, Ontario. Instead of just moving in, they were respectful and made multiple trips to have meetings with the Loners Peterborough chapter. The Loners were fine with them sharing the same city, though the Outlaws presence there would only last for a brief period. When the Loners Peterborough chapter had a conflict with the Vagos Motorcycle Club Canada in 2012–2014, tensions between the two groups ended when the Vagos were absorbed by the returning Outlaws. The Loners expansion into areas historically controlled by the Outlaws is another probable reason for conflict. Antonio Nicaso of Queen's University's criminal studies stated,

"This power struggle could be motivated by the eastward expansion of the Loners who were founded in Woodbridge in the York Region in 1979. They are a powerful organization with international ramification in the U.S. and Italy, so they should by no means be underestimated. They are looking for more space and more markets. Even if you touched their vest that will trigger the reaction, so imagine if you are burning down a clubhouse. I can't predict the future but I think that will trigger for sure more violence."

=== United States ===
In 1999, authorities in the United States arrested two high-ranking members of the Loners USA. This included the former president of the Loners Oklahoma chapter (located in Quapaw, Oklahoma) and the acting president of its Kentucky chapter. Both men were convicted of the manufacturing and distribution of methamphetamine.

In June 2020, multiple chapters of the Loners Wyoming, including the Rock Springs and Casper chapters, stood guard over monuments to prevent vandalism and also offered a form of protection to protestors in their communities that were exercising peaceful protests during the George Floyd protests. In Rock Springs, Wyoming, media managed to get an interview from the Loners Rock Springs chapter after a gathering. "Long before the protesters arrived with their posters and candles, bikers began to ride up one by one, and then in larger groups." The journalist commented. Initially a dozen members of the Loners Motorcycle Club stood guard over the memorial from the perimeter of Bunning Park. The Loners Rock Springs chapter clubhouse was located just across the street. A few members were armed with bats and clubs, and one with a rifle. As the protesters began to arrive some in the crowd began to speculate on the clubs intentions, on whether they were here to intimidate or show "silent support". But is the ceremony commenced the Loners were respectful and continued to observe. As the protest began to disperse local press, impressed by the bikers conduct desired to find out their side of the story. A member only identified as "Blade", who was the national enforcer for the Loners USA agreed to the interview. He expressed that the bikers were very patriotic and many had military backgrounds, he also explained that they were very disturbed by the looting and destruction of whole neighborhoods in the United States. They expressed that they cared for their communities and not just their businesses but other local businesses as well. Their presence was meant to keep people from vandalizing, but they also wanted to make sure that no harm came to the protesters. "They stressed the importance of demonstrating peaceably and said they were willing to defend it against others." The journalist said.

In December 2020, three members of the Loners Wyoming chapter (Rock Springs), were arrested in connection with an assault that occurred outside of the Loners clubhouse in April of the same year.

On June 21, 2022. A routine traffic stop by Rock Springs Police Department led to a high speed chase between them and Eddie Gordon, a member of the Loners Motorcycle Club's Rock Springs chapter. The Loner left the traffic stop at high after failing to yield, police followed. They eventually located his motorcycle on a nearby street, the member had feld the area on foot. The police continued to search the area, the member was eventually seen entering a second vehicle, now without his Loners vest. The getaway vehicle driven by another member, Eddie Smith, along with another Loner associate attempted to flee but was stopped by police. Police seized narcotics from inside the vehicle. Eddie Smith was arrested and charged for reckless driving, driving while license suspended, eluding, and expired registration. Eddie Gordon was arrested for driving while license suspended, possession of marijuana, and possession of cocaine. The other associate was released.

In August 2022, a member of the Loners Motorcycle Club's Tennessee chapter was arrested in Grants Pass, Oregon, for a hold out of Colorado and weapons charges. He was later released from jail due to charges being dropped from lack of evidence, Colorado decided not to transport him. The Full-patch members name was David "Cutter" W. Fritts from Tennessee.
