= IMC Financial Markets =

Electronic trading platform

IMC Trading
- Trade name: IMC Trading
- Company type: Private
- Industry: Financial services
- Founded: 1989; 37 years ago
- Founders: Robert Defares; René Schelvis
- Headquarters: Amsterdam, Netherlands
- Area served: Worldwide
- Key people: Robert Defares (CEO and chairman)
- Products: High-frequency trading, Market making
- Net income: ▲$686 million (2024)
- Total equity: ▲$1.866 billion (2024)
- Number of employees: 1,600 (2024)
- Website: imc.com

IMC Financial Markets, often referred to as IMC Trading, is a proprietary trading firm and market maker headquartered in Amsterdam, Netherlands. Founded in 1989 as International Marketmaker's Combination, the company employs over 1,600 people across offices in Chicago, Amsterdam, Sydney, Mumbai, Zug, Seoul, London, New York, and Hong Kong.

== History ==
IMC was founded in 1989 by Robert Defares and René Schelvis, two traders working on the floor of the Amsterdam Equity Options Exchange.

In 2008, Wiet Pot joined as co-CEO alongside Defares. Pot left the board in September 2017, leaving Defares as sole CEO.

== Trading ==
IMC operates as a proprietary trading firm and market maker across multiple asset classes, including equities, bonds, commodities, and currencies, on over 90 exchanges worldwide. A 2024 FT article highlighted IMC as particularly active in options and ETFs. The firm provides liquidity for more than 200,000 securities and maintains a significant market presence on major U.S. exchanges including NYSE Arca, NASDAQ, CBOE, BATS, and CME Group. IMC's trading strategies include market making, algorithmic arbitrage, and statistical arbitrage.

In 2014, the firm acquired Goldman Sachs' Designated Market Maker (DMM) trading rights on the New York Stock Exchange, becoming the DMM for more than 630 securities and approximately 400 operating companies. IMC is a top-three liquidity provider by volume in listed options globally and serves as a lead market maker for more than 150 exchange-traded funds in the United States.
