= Mario Parente =

Canadian outlaw biker and gangster

- Born: 1949 (age 76–77); Hamilton, Ontario, Canada
- Other name: "Mike the Wop"
- Occupations: Outlaw biker, gangster
- Years active: 1967–2009
- Known for: National president of Outlaws Canada
- Allegiance: Satan's Choice MC (1967–1977); Outlaws MC (1977–2009)
- Conviction: Manslaughter (1988)
- Penalty: 2 years and 6 months' imprisonment (1988)

Mario Parente (born 1949) is a Canadian outlaw biker and gangster, mostly noted for serving as the Canadian national president of the Outlaws Motorcycle Club between 2000 and 2009.

== Satan's Choice ==
Parente was born in Hamilton, Ontario into a working-class family of Italian immigrants. Parente was born and grew up in the "lower" part of Hamilton under "the Mountain" as locals call the Niagara Escarpment. "Lower" Hamilton is generally considered to be a poorer area than "upper" Hamilton. As a teenager, he joined the Hamilton chapter of Satan's Choice Motorcycle Club in 1967. In a 2009 interview, Parente gave his reasons for joining Satan's Choice in 1967 as: "Be free. Ride the bike. That's it. And being with a bunch of individuals that wanted to help each other out". Despite being Italian-Canadian, Parente chose as his biker name "The Wop" in an attempt to turn a pejorative term into an affirmative one. The majority of the people in Ontario in 1967 were Protestants of British descent, and Parente stood out in the Hamilton chapter on the account of his Italian heritage, which he sought to turn to his advantage. Parente dislikes the name Mario, which he considers to be effeminate, and prefers to be called Mike. Parente's first conviction came shortly after he joined Satan's Choice. Parente was convicted of assaulting a police officer, whom he saw beating a man who was already in handcuffs, leading Parente to attack the policeman. Parente has frequently worked as a construction worker, as a welder and as a bouncer. Parente's biographer, the journalist Jerry Langton wrote about the differences between Parente and his rival Walter Stadnick: "While nobody has ever tracked down a legitimate job held down by Stadnick (and I have spent many hours trying), Parente had worked in construction and welding and regularly served as a bouncer at some of Hamilton's most notorious bars and strip-joints. It was a profession that put him head-to-head with Hamilton's street toughs and members of such esteemed local organizations as the Ball-Peen Hammer Boys. And he always came out on top".

Detective Sergeant John Harris, a Hamilton policeman who first encountered Parente in 1972, stated: "Unlike a lot of guys, as soon as we started noticing him in Satan's Choice, he'd talk to us. Always had something to say, usually tried to be funny... He got into fights, and could sometimes be confrontational... He had this huge mop of black hair and a big, long beard. He kind of looked like Rasputin". Harris commented on the intense Italianness of Parente, saying "Parente looked Italian, acted Italian". Harris stated that Parente was usually jovial and friendly in his dealings with the police. He added: "One of the things I noticed about him early on was that he was always trying to improve himself, to educate himself. He always wanted to be more eloquent; and if he learned a new word, you could tell because he would use it over and over again in conversation until he found a new one". Parente developed a negative view of most policemen, calling them "bags of shit", but expressed much respect for Harris, despite him being on the other side of the law. Harris was a huge 6'7 man who once played football for the University of Minnesota and was described by Langton as "the biggest, most intimidating cop I've ever seen". Despite his respect for Harris, Parente stated that he could be "more physical than he had to be at times". Harris stated: "If you want to get on his good side, call him Mike; he hates being called Mario".

By 1969, Parente was widely viewed as the toughest member of the Hamilton chapter. The policeman Carl MacLeod stated: "Parente would eventually achieve the exalted reputation among bikers of having a special patch which meant he had either been charged for murder or had a murder conviction to his perverted credit". In 1969, MacLeod raided the clubhouse of the Hamilton chapter, becoming involved in a tense confrontation with Parente and eight other bikers that only ended when police back-up arrived. By the 1970s, Parente had risen to become the chapter president.

For a time, he was friendly with his future enemy Walter Stadnick, but the two fell out when Parente vetoed Stadnick's attempt to join Satan's Choice on the grounds he was too short. In 1976, the Satan's Choice national president Bernie Guindon was imprisoned for drug charges, leading Garnet "Mother" McEwen to become the new national president. On 1 July 1977, McEwen together with a number of Satan's Choice chapters "patched over" to join the Outlaws Motorcycle Club. Parente and the Hamilton chapter chose to join the Outlaws.

== Outlaws ==
Harris stated Parente became more self-confident after he "patched over" to join the Outlaws. Harris stated: "He was always willing to talk to you, no matter what the situation was like when he was with Satan's Choice. But once he became an Outlaw, he really worked on his personality and he started speaking for the club. He was their spokesman. He was on his bike all the time. And he wore a lot of jewelry. Not just the Harley stuff all the other guys wore, but always things with the Outlaws logo on them; he was very proud to be part of the club". Parente had a reputation in underworld circles as a tough leader. The journalists Julien Sher and William Marsden called Parente the "seemingly invincible leader" of the Outlaws, who never lost a fight. Detective Harris stated: "Mario wasn't the smartest guy in the business, but he had all the nerve. A lot of guys act tough, but he was the one who would do everything he promised to do".

One piece of jewelry Parente wore had the initials GLGC (Good-Looking Guys Club), which is an informal name the Outlaws use to describe themselves. Three Hamilton men, namely Lloyd Blaquierre, Michael Bierce, and Freddie Weise had been looking to join the Satan's Choice Hamilton chapter and after the "patch over" found themselves unable to join the new Outlaw Hamilton chapter because they were black. Harris recalled: "The Outlaws said it was whites-only and they had to abide by that. So those guys were out; you could be Jewish or Mexican, but you just couldn't be black". Weise, Bierce, and Blaquierre formed the No-Name Motorcycle Club, better known as the "Not So Good-Looking Guys Club". Harris stated that Parente and the rest of the Outlaws continued to associate with the Not So Good-Looking Guys Club but "they sure didn't like that name". The club ended when Weise, Bierce, and Blaquierre beat a man to death and dumped his body into Hamilton harbor, leading to their convictions and the club being disbanded.

On 5 December 1977, the Popeyes Motorcycle Club of Montreal "patched over" to become the first Hells Angel chapter in Canada. On 17 February 1978, a biker war began between the Outlaws and the Hells Angels was when the Hells Angel Yves "Apache" Trudeau shot two Outlaws in Montreal, killing one. In October 1978, Stadnick travelled to Montreal to contact Yves Buteau, the Hells Angels national president to discuss having the Wild Ones "patch over" to become the first Hells Angels chapter in Ontario. Stadnick's plans were aborted by Le Tourbillon massacre on 12 October 1978 when two American Outlaws went into Le Tourbillon bar to shoot the Angels and Wild Ones who were meeting there, killing one of the Angels and two of the Wild Ones. The Hamilton Outlaw chapter killed 5 members of the Wild Ones, causing the latter gang disbanded themselves. Stadnick ended up joining the Hells Angels and became in charge of expanding the club into Ontario.

In July 1983, the Hells Angels national president Yves Buteau established the first Angel chapters outside of Quebec when he persuaded the three-chapter strong Satan's Angels biker gang, based in the Lower Mainland of British Columbia and on Vancouver Island, to "patch over" to join the Hells Angels. On 17 July 1983, two Hells Angels from Montreal, Michel "Jinx" Genest and Jean-Marc Nadeau, went via bus to Vancouver to attend the planned ceremony. On route through northern Ontario, Parente and a group of Outlaws happened to ride by the bus and noticed one of the bus passengers was wearing Hells Angels' colors. Parente was riding on Highway 17 outside of North Bay when he noticed a jacket bearing the Hells Angels' patch pressed against the window of the bus. Sending one of the bikers to follow the bus, Parente and the rest stopped in Sault Ste. Marie to pick up their guns and then boarded an automobile. Enraged by the presence of the two Hells Angels in Ontario, Parente and the other Outlaws proceeded to shoot up the bus when it stopped at the Mr. Mugs coffee and doughnut shop in Wawa in an attempt to kill the two Hells Angels. A Ford Taurus automobile pulled into the Mr. Mugs parking lot and the men in the car pulled out their handguns to open fire on the bus. Three people were slightly hurt by the broken glass. As the car drove away, two of the witnesses noticed it had a "Support Your Local Outlaws" bumper sticker. Through no one was killed, the Wawa incident showed strongly Parente felt about Hells Angels moving into Ontario. Later that day, the police arrested Parente and his fellow Outlaws Roy Caja, and Ben Greco at the Outlaws' Sault St. Marie clubhouse and charged them with attempted murder. Parente insists that he was not present at the Wawa incident, but a number of sources have stated he was one of the gunmen in the car. Sher and Marsden wrote about the Wawa incident that: "It was Parente in 1983 who shot up a bus in Wawa in an attempt to murder some Hells Angels passengers-prompting Stadnick to seek police protection while he was hospitalized after his accident".

While waiting trial for the Wawa incident, Parente was arrested again for killing the "local tough guy" Jimmy Lewis. Parente worked as a bouncer at a well known Hamilton strip club named Bannister's. Bannister's was owned by Rinaldo Ticchiarelli and Louis Acciaroli, two cocaine dealers who used the establishment as a place to launder money. The police were looking to shut down Bannister's by vigorously enforcing a by-law that stated that any bar that admitted intoxicated patrons would lose its liquor license, thus leading to Parente being strict about who he admitted into Bannister's. Parente had a long-standing feud with the three Lewis brothers, frequently quarreling with them. The Lewis brothers were Tim, Brian and Jimmy. The Lewis brothers were petty criminals who worked as general laborers by day and by night made their living by extorting money via threats and violence. One night in 1984, Brian Lewis had shown up drunk at Bannister's, leading to a fight when Parente refused him to allow him in. After Bannister's closed, Parente went to the Outlaws' clubhouse at 402 Birch Avenue. According to Parente's account, the three Lewis brothers together with five other friends were looking for him and arrived at the Outlaws' clubhouse with Tim Lewis waving about a handgun while somebody kept shouting "shoot him!". Parente stated he brought along his shotgun in case of trouble. Parente insists that he shot Jimmy Lewis in self-defense. According to Parente's account, he opened fire when Tim Lewis raised his handgun and his target was actually Tim Lewis, not Jimmy Lewis. Jimmy Lewis was killed instantly by the shotgun blast, which caused the rest of the gang to run away in terror. Parente was arrested later that night at a house of a friend in St. Catharines. At his trial for the Wawa incident in Sault Ste. Marie, Parente pleaded guilty to the illegal possession of a weapon and was sentenced to six years in prison. Parente was shocked by the sentence, but learned the judge had imposed the maximum sentence because of the Lewis shooting incident.

The Hamilton chapter of the Outlaws planned to kill Stadnick by firing a rocket launcher at the Rebel Roadhouse, where he had his office, but the Hamilton police arrested those involved in the plan before any rockets were fired. Detective Harris stated about the failed plot: "When Parente was running the show, they would had done it; but after he went to prison they didn't have the guts".

At his trial for Lewis's death in 1988, Parente was convicted of manslaughter and sentenced to 30 months in prison. Another source states that he received 3 years in prison for Lewis's death. The Crown Attorney, Tony Skarica, had indicted Parente for second degree murder, but the judge at the trial, Justice Thomas Callon, accepted the claims of Parente's lawyer that he acted in self-defense. Callon ruled that Parente had "reacted to a serious threat of personal harm to him that included the possibility of death". After Parente's release from prison, Brian Lewis later showed at a bar to confront Parente for killing his brother, leading to Parente to beat him up and expel him. Brian Lewis accidentally killed himself at a party when he was quite intoxicated and pointed his handgun at his head, saying "you wanna know what I'm going to do to Mike the Wop? This is what I'm gonna to do to Mike the Wop!" Lewis then pulled the trigger, sending a bullet straight through his brain. The final Lewis brother, Tim, was killed in an automobile accident.

On 28 November 1992, Parente's then girlfriend, Linda DeMaria, was the target of an assassination attempt; the police believe that the bullets fired at her might have been meant for him. DeMaria was returning from a party with Parente and several other friends. She had just parked her car in the driveway of Parente's house at about 2:00 am and was getting out of the vehicle when she was shot once in the lower back. The bullet fired from a 9mm handgun struck just above her pelvis and left via her abdomen, and she was rushed to the hospital where her life was saved. The police described Parente and the other members of the group who witnessed the shooting as "co-operative up to a point". In 1992, Parente was accused of laundering money for the Mafia in connection with an Italian-born businessman, Vincenzo "Jimmy" DeMaria, but Parente and DeMaria were able to prove a legitimate source for the money.

In June 1993, Stadnick and the other Hells Angels leaders hosted a party in Wasaga Beach attended by the leaders of all the Ontario biker gangs except for the Outlaws and Satan's Choice. One police officer stated: "We knew that if he [Stadnick] had invited the Outlaws-especially Parente-then there would be no war in Ontario. But when they weren't there, it kind of made us a little uneasy".

On 29 April 1996, the Ontario Provincial Police (OPP) launched Project Charlie, a crackdown on the Outlaws and a warrant was issued for Parente's arrest. Parente was arrested at the clubhouse of the St. Catharines chapter of the Outlaws. He was charged with conspiracy to sell cocaine and uttering death threats. As part of Project Charlie, nine other members of the St. Catharines chapter were charged with various counts relating to narcotics, prostitution, and attempted murder. On 10 July 1996, Parente was attacked in the Hamilton-Wentworth Jail by an inmate just arrived from Montreal who assaulted him with a crude home-made knife fashioned out of a tooth brush. Parente was able to fight off his attacker, suffering superficial injuries to his eyes and throat. Following the outlaw biker code, Parente refused to testify against his attacker. Parente stated in 2009 about his refusal to testify against the man who tried o gouge out his eyes: "It's my-how do you do say?-my honour. My respect. I wouldn't be able to look in the mirror if on my account somebody was in jail. I wouldn't be able to look in the mirror and feel good about myself". The Crown offered to drop the charges relating to Project Charlie in exchange for him turning Crown's evidence, an offer he rejected. In 1997, the Project Charlie charges against Parente were dropped when the Crown decided there was little prospect of a conviction. Parente believes that he was only charged out of the hope he might turn Crown's evidence.

In 1997, the hitman Kenneth Murdock was by hired by the Musitano brothers to kill four men, one of whom was Parente. As far as it can be established, Murdock never made an attempt against Parente. Parente rose up to become the national president of the Outlaws. An Outlaw-turned-police informer known to the media as "BK" owing to a court order described him: "Mario was a paranoid guy. Never used the phone. Never wrote anything down. Multimillionaire Mario was for Mario. Sold drugs by the kilo". The journalist Alex Caine described Stadnick, who had become the Hells Angels national president in 1988, as the better strategist as Stadnick saw establishing the Angels in Winnipeg as important to creating a national club while Parente was only focused on Ontario. The journalists Julian Sher and William Marsden wrote that Manitoba was crucial because it was "the axis of distribution for any drugs moving east and west in the country". Caine described Parente as the traditional biker leader, a working-class tough guy while calling Stadnick a modern biker leader who was more alike to a corporate CEO.

According to the police informer BK, the American leadership of the Outlaws disliked Parente as BK stated: "He wanted money from the U.S., but they didn't like him down there. He couldn't tell the truth. They'd ask him how many members there were in Canada and he'd say 200 when we had maybe 60". BK stated the general feeling was that "Mario was for Mario". The journalist Jerry Langton described Parente as the "main reason" why the Hells Angels had such difficulty becoming established in Ontario, despite trying to enter the Ontario market from 1978 onward.

In the summer of 2000, Stadnick made an offer to most of the Ontario outlaw biker gangs that was too sweet for them to refuse; namely they could join the Hells Angels "patch for patch", allowing them to enter the Hells Angels with patches equivalent to their current patches. On 29 December 2000, in a much publicized ceremony, most of the Ontario outlaw biker gangs such as Satan's Choice, the Vagabonds, the Lobos, the Last Chance, the Para-Dice Riders and some of the Loners travelled to Hells Angels' "mother chapter" clubhouse in Sorel, just south of Montreal to join the Hells Angels, making them at one stroke the dominant outlaw biker club in Ontario. On that day, dozens of chartered buses from Ontario arrived at the Angels clubhouse in Sorel, carrying the bikers. Even some Outlaws such as David "the Hammer" MacDonald of the Hamilton chapter and Shaun "Cheeks" Boshaw of the London chapter went over to the Hells Angels. Detective Len Isnor, the head of the OPP's Anti-Biker Enforcement Unit, said: "Most of these guys are what we called 'paper Outlaws'. They were bikers first and foremost and the patch, the Outlaws name and organization, didn't mean that much to them. If it wasn't for Parente, who was an Outlaw through and through, they probably would have folded". Parente called James "Frank" Wheeler, the president of the American Outlaws, who in turn contacted Ralph "Sonny" Barger, the leader of the American Hells Angels. Barger ordered Stadnick to stop trying to recruit Outlaws in exchange for a promise that there would be no biker war in Ontario. At the Toronto Exhibition Grounds, both Isnor and Parente found themselves surrounded by Hells Angels, leading to Parente to joke to Isnor: "You'll probably want to stick with us for a little while".

== Project Retire ==
On 25 September 2002, the OPP launched Project Retire, an operation intended to end the Outlaws once and for all in Ontario. As part of the Project Retire raids, the police seized five stolen motorcycles, one stolen truck, 44 guns, drugs worth about $1.6 million and five Outlaw clubhouses. All 58 Outlaws in Ontario were arrested. One of Parente's neighbors described him: "Really nice – I mean, we all knew he was this important biker – but he was never anything other than polite and pleasant as far as I knew". After his arrest, the journalist Colin Freeze reported: "The Outlaws motorcycle club is big business, a culture of crime and killing that insists on Harley-Davidsons, limits membership to whites and marks and trades women like cattle". Freeze described Parente and the other Outlaws as being a part of a strange subculture where the SS runes were awarded to those who killed for the club and women were treated like property, to be brought and traded by the Outlaws.

Elizabeth Maguire, the Crown Attorney prosecuting Parente, met twice in private with Justice John Getliffe before Parente's preliminary hearing (the Canadian equivalent to the grand jury phrase of a trial) where she gained the impression that Getliffe intended to convict Parente and declare the Outlaws a criminal organization. Believing that case had already been decided, Maguire did not call many witnesses at the preliminary hearing to avoid exposing them to questions from Parente's lawyer, Jack Pinkofsky. On 30 June 2004, Getliffe dismissed the charges against Parente, saying that the Crown had failed to present enough evidence. In response, Maguire chose to engage in the rare legal maneuver of preferring an indictment, asking the Attorney-General to reinstate the charges against Parente, leading to a committee of experts headed by Deputy Attorney General Murray Segal to have Parente charged again. The Crown frequently offered Parente a plea bargain under which they would drop the charges against him if he were to confess to being a member of a criminal organization, an offer that Parente always rejected.

In June 2005, Pinkofsky filed an abuse of process motion against Maguire, arguing that her private meetings with Getliffe were illegal. When Senior Assistant Crown Attorney John Hanbidge asked Magiure why she had the meetings with Getliffe, her response was to say: "Are you nuts? You're giving my head to Jack on a platter!" At the hearing, Justice Lynda Templeton ruled in favor of Pinkofsky, stating: "For a presiding judge in an ongoing preliminary inquiry to have unnecessarily called the Crown into chambers, and to have proceeded to discuss the case to any extent at all in the absence of opposing counsel was, in my view, entirely inappropriate. It is incomprehensible to me that... Ms. Maguire did not disclose this meeting to defense counsel. Her obligation to do so was unequivocal; her failure to do so was a breach of duty". Templeton also chided Maguire that she cared more about "her own status, sense of professionalism and protection from scrutiny" than she cared about Parente's rights as a defendant and declared her actions had "sullied" the Ontario justice system. Maguire was dismissed from the case and replaced by Alex Smith. Parente has an on-going lawsuit against Magiure, alleging malicious prosecution.

Parente was held in jail, but was released on $400,000 bail in 2004. After the preferred indictment came through, Parente went back to jail. In 2005, he was again released on $400,000 bail, had to live by a sundown curfew and even through he lived in Hamilton had to visit the London police station three times a week to ensure he was obeying his bail conditions. Parente's girlfriend, Nadia Kosta and her friend Silvana DiMartino, lost their security clearances at the Pearson Airport in Toronto, meaning that they were in effect fired from their jobs as passenger-information representatives. Kosta lost her security clearance because she posted bail for Parente, leading to the airport to declare her a person of bad character. Kosta protested that she had posted bail for Parente in 1996 and acquired her security clearance in 2001. DiMartino lost her security clearance because she had was a friend of Parente and Kosta and was found to have a deck of playing cards with the logo "Support Your Local Outlaws". After a series of lengthy appeals, both Kosta and DiMartino regained their security clearances and their jobs. Parente paid his legal bills out of his own pocket and that of Kosta, being forced to sell almost everything he owned. Parente stated bitterly in 2009: "The club has never donated a nickel. So that's how much of a criminal organization this club in Canada is". Parente maintains that the Outlaws are just a motorcycle club that has criminals as members, but is not a criminal organization, saying in an interview: "If someone was dealing coke, he wouldn't tell me about it, it wasn't my business. One time a guy comes up to me and tells me he is selling a trailer full of chickens – didn't tell me where or how he got it, and I didn't ask. All I said to him, 'What the hell am I going to do with a trailer of chickens?'"

By October 2008, sixteen of the Outlaws arrested had pleaded guilty to being members of a criminal organization with almost all the others also made plea bargains in exchange for reduced sentences. In February 2005, the president of Woodstock Outlaws chapter and national vice-president, Kevin Legere, pleaded guilty for a reduced sentence. On 18 October 2008, William Mellow, a member of the Outlaw London chapter and national secretary, made a deal in which he pledged guilty to the illegal possession of a handgun without a license, in exchange for which he accepted a court order ruling that he could not be in contact with any other Outlaws. Parente together with Luis Ferreira were the only Outlaws who refused to make plea bargains and chose to take their chances with a jury. Harris described Ferreira: "He was a local bad guy, a buddy of Parente's. He became an Outlaw, but was never a major guy. Nobody ever really knew what he did to deserve membership, but he was always a loyal guy". Parente felt much disgust with the willingness of his fellow Outlaws to make plea bargains, feeling that the other members were being very selfish in testifying for the Crown in order to reduce their sentences. Parente stated: "I was prepared to sit in there forever if I had to. As far as we're concerned, we fought this to the bitter end; I was prepared to go on as long as I had to prove otherwise". The primary witness against Parente was a member of the Outlaws' Sault St. Marie chapter known only as BK due to a court order. Parente insists that he barely knew BK, but Isnor has stated that Parente did know BK very well and that he had witnessed "at least three [cocaine] buys" between the two.

On 12 March 2009, Alex Smith, the Crown Attorney prosecuting Parente's case dropped all seventeen weapons and drug charges against him, saying there was no reasonable prospect of a conviction if the case should go to trial. Smith announced that the key informer was unwilling to testify, making a conviction impossible. With BK unwilling to testify, the case against Parenete collapsed. Parente stated that the case against him was weak, which was why BK chose not to testify. Isnor by contrast stated: "After six and a half years, he was tired, not as sure he could provide accurate evidence. I've got to hand it to Pinkofsky for dragging the trial on that long". Through Parente and Ferreira had the charges against them dropped in 2009, Project Retire crippled the Outlaws in Ontario as the club was only a shadow of its former self with almost all of its members being convicted. Isnor stated about the outcome of the Parente case: "My job was not to put Mario Parente behind bars. It was to put the Outlaws out of business in Ontario". In 2009, Parente sued the Crown to seek the return of his confiscated assets, which the Crown refused to do under the grounds that Parente was a member of a criminal organization. The Crown's argument was that even through the charges against Parente were dropped, because other Outlaws confessed to being members of a criminal organization that his assets were still forfeited to the Crown.

In an interview published with Peter Edwards, the crime correspondent of the Toronto Star published on 30 March 2009, Parente expressed much fury at the Crown, saying: "If there was so much evidence, why didn't the Crown come forward with it?". About his lifestyle, Parente stated: ""I have to say I'm not a saint. I've made mistakes... I'm not claiming that I'm goody two-shoes." Parente also expressed his disgust with his fellow Outlaws, saying: "They (other Outlaws) were out partying and didn't donate a dime to help out. I don't get a nickel of support from anybody to fight something that implicates everybody... With brothers like that, who needs enemies?" In the same interview, he announced his resignation as Outlaws national president, saying he was angry at the lack of support from the other Outlaws, whom he had no respect for. Parente concluded the interview by saying he was now intending to work as a construction contactor. Parente was replaced as the Outlaws national president with Richard "Dooker" Williams.

== Life after the Outlaws ==
In 2009, Parente approached the author Jerry Langton to write his biography. Langton described Parente as a man standing 6'0 tall with a head shaven completely bald, a Fu Manchu mustache and a face bearing the scars of the many fights he has been in over the years. He described Parente as a highly muscular man as he acquired the habit of lifting weights while he was in prison. In terms of personality, Langton described Parente as being alike to the persona projected by the actor Joe Pesci as "...he gave off a similar but far less unctuous vibe... It was hard not to be charmed by his mixture of wit, bonhomie and strident speech".

Langton stated in 2010 about the writing process: "Parente approached me originally to write his life story as he saw it, but I couldn't do that. I had to investigate things for myself. He got angry at me a couple of times, because he came into the process with certain things in mind that he wanted to get accomplished. He wanted me to tell the story as he saw it, and when I didn't agree with that, he got angry at me, but was nothing short of gentlemanly and was very polite. I would have liked to have worked with him, but I couldn't do what he wanted me to do." In 2019, Parente's long-standing civil suit to secure the Outlaw assets seized by the Crown in 2002 finally ended with the Crown handing over assets worth $238.97 as the rest went to cover unpaid property taxes on the Outlaw clubhouses. Parente at present is looking for a ghost-writer to write his autobiography.

Parente later expressed some dissatisfaction about Langton, saying he failed to interview enough outlaw bikers and only interviewed "cops, snitches and lawyers". Langton responded by writing that outlaw bikers are never willing in interviews to say anything that is of any use for his books as they always claim to never have broken any laws.

== Sources ==
- Caine, Alex (2012). Charlie and the Angels The Outlaws, the Hells Angels and the Sixty Years War. Toronto: RandomHouse. ISBN 9780307358967.
- Auger, Michel; Edwards, Peter (2012). The Encyclopedia of Canadian Organized Crime: From Captain Kidd to Mom Boucher. Toronto: McClelland & Stewart. ISBN 978-0771030499.
- Edwards, Peter (2010), The Bandido Massacre; A True Story of Bikers, Brotherhood and Betrayal, HarperCollins Publishers Ltd, ISBN 978-0307372765
- Knuckle, Robert (2007). A Master of Deception: Working Undercover for the RCMP. Renfrew: General Store Publishing House. ISBN 978-1897113660.
- Langton, Jerry (2006). Fallen Angel: The Unlikely Rise of Walter Stadnick and the Canadian Hells Angels. Toronto: Harper Collins. ISBN 144342725X.
- Langton, Jerry (2010). Showdown: How the Outlaws, Hells Angels and Cops Fought for Control of the Streets. Toronto: John Wiley. ISBN 978-0470678787.
- Langton, Jerry (2013). The Notorious Bacon Brothers : inside gang warfare on Vancouver streets. Etobicoke, Ont.: J. Wiley and Sons Canada. ISBN 978-1118388679.
- Schneider, Stephen (2009). Iced: The Story of Organized Crime in Canada. Toronto: John Wiley & Sons. ISBN 978-0470835005.
- Sher, Julien; Marsden, William (2003). The Road to Hell: How the Biker Gangs Are Conquering Canada. Toronto: Vintage. ISBN 978-0676975994.
