= Gennaro Raso =

Canadian outlaw biker (born 1959)

- Born: 22 June 1959 (age 67); Gabella, Catanzaro, Italy
- Other name: "Jimmy"
- Occupation: Outlaw biker
- Known for: Co-Founder of the Loners Motorcycle Club; Current World President of the Loners MC
- Allegiance: Satan's Choice (19??–1977); Rebels MC (1978–1979); Loners MC (1979–present)

Gennaro Raso or Jimmy Raso (born 22 June 1959) is an Italian-Canadian outlaw biker, who is best known for co-founding the Loners Motorcycle Club with close friend Frank Lenti. He would end up retaining full leadership over the club in 1994 and currently serves as the club's International President.

== Early history ==
Born in Gabella, Catanzaro, Italy on June 22, 1959, very little is known about the early years of his life, aside from when he was a young man, he and his family emigrated to Canada in February 1967. His family settled in Toronto, Ontario. In 1970, he was worked as an extra during the production of a low budget exploitation film The Proud Rider. Many of the extras in The Proud Rider were members of Satan's Choice Motorcycle Club who were essentially playing themselves. Raso greatly admired the Satan's Choice national president Bernie Guindon as he stated in a 2016 interview: "I met Bernie in the early 1970s. I always looked up to him. I thought he was a cool guy, a very smart man. Bernie's Bernie. Bernie doesn't take shit from anybody...He didn't have to carry a gun. It was different back then".

At some point he became involved in organized crime and by the 1970s, when he was old enough his admiration of Guindon would lead Raso tho join the Choice. There he would meet future Loners co-founder Frank "Cisco" Lenti, they had both joined the Satan's Choice Motorcycle Club, however their chapter was among those that were later "Patched-Over" to the Outlaws Motorcycle Club in 1977. They both left and started the only Ontario chapter of the Rebels Motorcycle Club, not too long after Raso and Lenti decided to form the Loners Motorcycle Club, which was founded in Woodbridge, Ontario in 1979.

In 1981, Lenti was removed from the club for a period, it was alleged that Lenti had stolen from the club, and was caught, at which point he decided to flee the country to Italy. Where he lived for the next two years, this was also due Cecil Kirby being a prominent member of the Satan's Choice, turned police informer in 1980. In 1981, Kirby told Lenti that he should leave Toronto for a while as he was about to reveal a large amount of incriminating evidence to the Crown. During this period Raso would gain full leadership over the club. Lenti officially rejoined the Loners Motorcycle Club upon his return to Canada in 1983, with Raso's blessing. When Lenti was removed from the club he travelled to Italy, he continued to use the Loners name despite his removal from the club in 1981, while in Italy he persuaded other motorcycle clubs to join the Loners, he also opened several new chapters. These chapters were not associated with the Official Loners MC until Lenti's return to the club in 1984 when all new chapters were officially recognized by Raso.

Raso would also eventually begin expand the club overseas officially, establishing chapters in the United States as well as additional countries in Europe. With his first European chapter opening on 24 December 1985. By the 1990s, the Loners had chapters in Woodbridge, Toronto, Vaughan, Richmond Hill, Windsor, London, Amherstburg, Lindsay and Chatham-Kent(which became the London chapter in 1990s). Unusually for a Canadian outlaw biker club by the mid-1980s, the Loners had chapters abroad with one in Portugal and several in Italy, having chapters in Naples, Messina, Salerno, Reggio Calabria, Brolo, Avellino and Isernia.

== LMC World President ==
The Loners were a successful club under Lenti's leadership. By the late 1980s, the Loners were the third largest motorcycle club in Ontario, being exceeded only by the Outlaws and Satan's Choice. Raso was forced to remove Lenti from the Loners for the second time in 1994, which is said to either be due to allegations of him stealing from the club or the fact that his temper was apparently getting out of control. Upon being kicked out of the Loners, Lenti would go on to found a new outlaw motorcycle club, the Diablos MC, which would later go to war with the Loners in the summer of 1995, supported by the Satan's Choice. Raso would lead the Loners through the conflict against the Satan's Choice and Diablos and would emerge victorious by late 1995, completely destroying and absorbing the Diablos.

In early 1997, the Loners split into two factions, one led by Raso and another by Frank Grano. The pro-Hells Angel faction led by Grano joined the Para-Dice Riders while a rump remained under Raso. The split a breach with the Hells Angels. Stadnick had cut off the Loners supply to narcotics. Without a supply of drugs from the Hells Angels, the journalist Jerry Langton that the Loners "faded into obscurity. Bikers gangs without a steady supply of drugs to sell generally don't make headlines".. In the 2000, Raso was a driving force in having the Loners form an alliance with fellow International Canadian Motorcycle Club the Rock Machine.

Raso would lead the club through the Ontario Biker War as the Hells Angels engaged the Outlaws and the Loners for control of the province. 2001 saw the clubs London chapter join the Bandidos, which Raso heavy disagreed with as he had declined offer to "Patch-Over" any chapters. On 22 May 2001, Raso lost an entire chapter to the Bandidos.

== Criminal allegations and incidents ==
On August 3, 2016. Raso was arrested by Toronto Police after he was involved in an incident. The alleged incident took place near Royal York and Allenhurst roads, in Etobicoke, Ontario. Raso faced 15 charges including several for uttering threats, recklessly discharging a firearm and endangering live. The Police were able to secure a warrant to search the home of Jim Raso, located in Woodbridge. The authorities were only successful in one charge including "several grams" of Marijuana after one search warrant was thrown out by the judge in early 2016. On September 16, 2016, Raso was released on bail and on June 16, 2017, All charges against him were withdrawn by the Crown prosecutor.

Also in August 2016. Gennaro's son, Micheal Raso who is also a member of the Loners Motorcycle Club was allegedly involved in a drive-by shooting of the residence of Chief Financial Officer for the Dream Corporation(multi-million dollar Caribbean-based casino company), Ed Kremblewski, who was a minor witness in the attempted murder case against Antonio Carbone, who was a majority shareholder in Dream Corp. Carbone was an entrepreneur from Toronto that was involved in the casino business along with his brother, he was also found guilty of firebombing a rival's Jaguar on December 1, 2014. The vehicle belonged to Dream Casino manager Fernando Baez, Antonio stated "Dream was estimated at $540 million so we're talking about the largest … conspiracy in the Dominican Republic."

Both brothers had been involved in a "series of lawsuits and countersuits revolving around the ownership and control of the company." Accusing them of attempting to defraud the Carbones brothers of their assets since the beginning of the partnership, Antonio was arrested on attempted murder in January 2015, he was imprisoned in the Dominican Republic and waited for his trial for two years. In total, Antonio was being sued in Canada for defrauding an investor of around $100 million, in the Dominican he was charged with stock manipulation and attempted murder.

In mid 2016, before Carbone's conviction it was alleged that he had hired the Loners Motorcycle Club to put pressure on the witnesses and members of Dream Corp. Bullets were fired at Ed Kremblewski's home while his family was present, during the same time he and his sons were receiving threatening phone calls. Kremblewski launched a civil lawsuit against Gennaro Raso, president of the Loners, his son Michael and Francesco Carbone, the brother of Antonio. Kremblewski claims that he and his family faced threats of maiming and death if the charges against Antonio were not dropped and that his son would be shot in the head, his daughter would be maimed and killed and that his elderly parents would be assaulted and killed.

The lawsuit states, that the brothers had been using the Loners chapter in the Dominican to contact one another, Kremblewski also alleges that Francesco Carbone was behind the intimidation campaign carried out by the Loners MC and that Francesco Carbone even provided $18,000 in Canadian currency to Michael Raso to bribe a Dominican judicial official in an attempt to have his brother Antonio released on bail. The claims in the lawsuit against the Raso's and Francesco Carbone remain unproven.

== Books ==
- Edwards, Peter (2010), The Bandido Massacre; A True Story of Bikers, Brotherhood and Betrayal, HarperCollins Publishers Ltd, ISBN 978-0307372765
- Edwards, Peter (2017). Hard Road: Bernie Guindon and the Reign of the Satan's Choice Motorcycle Club. Toronto: Random House. ISBN 978-0345816108.
- Langton, Jerry (2006), Fallen Angel: The Unlikely Rise of Walter Stadnick and the Canadian Hells Angels, [HarperCollins Publishers, ISBN 144342725X
- Langton, Jerry (2010). Showdown: How the Outlaws, Hells Angels and Cops Fought for Control of the Streets. Toronto: John Wiley & Sons. ISBN 978-0470678787.
