= International Medical Center =

International Medical Center المركز الطبي الدولي

Geography
- Location: Jeddah, Saudi Arabia
- Coordinates: 21°30′49″N 39°10′28″E

Organisation
- Type: Private

Services
- Beds: 300

History
- Founded: 2005

Links
- Website: www.imc.med.sa
- Lists: Hospitals in Saudi Arabia
- Other links: Health care in Saudi Arabia

International Medical Center or IMC is a large private hospital in Jeddah, Saudi Arabia, and was built in 2005. The CEO of the center is Dr. Walid Fitaihi.

The IMC is a multi-disciplinary hospital that features specialty centers providing a wide range of comprehensive treatment options for different health problems. These services are delivered by more than 150 physicians in more than thirty specialties including Orthopedics, Cardiology, Oncology, Women's Health and Children's Health.

The IMC was inaugurated in 2006 by the Custodian of the Two Holy Mosques King Abdullah bin Abdulaziz and the late Crown Prince Sultan bin Abdulaziz after more than twelve years of extensive planning. In 2017, IMC bought 62% of Bait Al Batterjee Medical Company shares in Saudi-German hospitals across the region.
