= Jerry Langton =

Canadian author

Jerry Langton (born October 1, 1965) is a Canadian author. His focus is on crime, specifically the rise of motorcycle gangs throughout Ontario. Langton's books are published by John Wiley and Sons. He has written 10 books and is the author of the bestseller Gangland: The Rise of the Mexican Cartels from El Paso to Vancouver; Showdown: How the Outlaws, Hells Angels and Cops Fought for Control of the Streets; and Fallen Angel: The Unlikely Rise of Walter Stadnick in the Canadian Hells Angels.

Langton was born on October 1, 1965, in Hamilton, Ontario. He spent most of his adult life in Toronto and New York City.

== Books ==
- Gangland: The Rise of the Mexican Cartels from El Paso to Vancouver
- Showdown: How the Outlaws, Hells Angels and Cops Fought for Control of the Streets
- Fallen Angel: The Unlikely Rise of Walter Stadnick in the Canadian Hells Angels
- Rat: How the World's Most Notorious Rodent Clawed Its Way to the Top (first published in the U.S. by St. Martin's Press in 2007)
- Parnas, Lev, and Jerry Langton (2024). Shadow Diplomacy: Lev Parnas' Wild Ride from Brooklyn to Donald Trump's Inner Circle. ISBN 979-8-8795-2030-9
- Langton, Jerry (2013). The Notorious Bacon Brothers Inside Gang Warfare on Vancouver Streets Toronto: John Wiley and Sons.
