= George Kriarakis =

Canadian outlaw biker (1978–2006)

- Born: 1978; Toronto, Ontario, Canada
- Died: 8 April 2006 (aged 27–28); Elgin County, Ontario, Canada
- Other name: "Crash"
- Occupations: Outlaw biker; tow-truck driver
- Known for: National secretary of the Bandidos in Canada
- Allegiance: Bandidos MC

George Kriarakis (1978 – 8 April 2006) was a Canadian outlaw biker and gangster who served as the last national secretary of the Bandidos Motorcycle Club in Canada and was one of the victims of the Shedden massacre of 2006.

== Bandidos ==
Kriarakis was born in Toronto, the son of Greek immigrants and worked as a tow truck driver. Kriarakis excelled as a rugby player as a high school student. His nickname of "Crash" was related to his occupation as a tow truck driver. Kriarakis had no criminal record, refused to use drugs and shunned the company of strippers. James "Ripper" Fullager, who had been active in outlaw biking since the 1960s and whose home in Toronto was a favorite gathering place for the Bandidos, where Fullager recounted his past adventures and gave them advice. The Victoria Day weekend in May is the normal start of the riding season for outlaw bikers in Canada. For Victoria Day in 2003, it turned out that of the Bandidos only Giovanni "Boxer" Muscedere, Frank "Cisco" Lenti, Glenn "Wrongway" Atkinson and Kriarakis actually owned working Harley-Davidson motorcycles, which humiliated Lenti who bitterly complained about "bikers without bikes".

In June 2003, while Kriarakis was eating in a restaurant in Woodbridge he was surrounded by a dozen Hells Angels and ordered to go out to the parking lot to be beaten as Woodbridge was considered to be "their" territory. One of Kriarakis's friends called Lenti on his cellphone, who promptly raced off in his tow truck to help his biker "brother" while Kriarakis was badly beaten up in the parking lot. Upon arriving, Lenti was furious to see that Kriarakis had called the police to report the assault, telling him that outlaw bikers never report to the police a crime committed by other outlaw bikers, even against themselves. At a meeting at Fullager's house, Kriarakis was taken to task for his violation of the outlaw biker code, which just publicly humiliated the Toronto Bandido chapter. Muscedere told Kriarakis: "You should had fought like a man". Kriarakis left Woodbridge shortly afterwards to move into a luxury condominium in Toronto. Pointedly, he did not tell Muscedere or Lenti of the move. For a time, he worked on a dairy farm in Camrose, Alberta in an apparent attempt to get away from the Bandidos.

During the Taste of the Danforth festival in Toronto in August 2004, Atkinson met Kriarakis to tell him he was planning on leaving the Bandidos, saying that the national president Giovanni Muscedere had lost contact with reality, being short-sighted and ill-tempered; the national sergeant-at-arms Wayne "Wiener" Kellestine was dangerous, and the new Winnipeg chapter president Michael "Taz" Sandham seemed like a shady character. Atkinson wanted Kriarakis to follow him into the Outlaws, and when the latter refused, Atkinson remarked: "These guys are going to get you killed one day". Kriarakis felt a sense of loyalty plus he wanted to recover the $5,000 he lent another member, Paul "Big Paulie" Sinopoli to help him buy a motorcycle. After Atkinson left the Bandidos, Krarakis replaced him as the national secretary. At the Bandido Christmas party in 2004, Kellestine became annoyed when the DJ kept playing rap music. He walked over to the DJ and pulled out his gun, saying: "Stop playing this nigger stuff. Play Lynyrd Skynyrd or something better than this shit or I'll blow your foot off". After that incident, the fiancée of Kriarakis started pressing him to leave the club. Kriarakis's wife Diane whom he married in 2005 often pressed him to quit the Bandidos, and he himself talked frequently of his desire to leave the club, but he stayed out of loyalty to his biker "brothers".

On 28 December 2005, the American leadership of the Bandidos, who had grown increasingly unhappy with Muscedere's leadership, expelled him and his followers, charging that they were failing to make money, not paying their monthly membership dues because they did not have the money, and were going about business in a "sloppy" manner, leaving them wide open to prosecution. Kriarakis refused the demand to return his Bandidos patches to their world headquarters in Houston, Texas, writing on various Bandidos-related websites and forums that "Ontario is standing tall". In an email to the Bandidos American national secretary, William Sartelle, Kriarakis wrote "Give us a fair and reasonable chance". Kriarakis also called Sartelle "a peace of work", leading Sartelle to respond: "Yes, I am a piece of work and proud of who I am". A reprieve of sorts was won for the "no surrender crew" when Kriarakis, who had no criminal record, was able to visit Houston and made a good impression. Kriarakis was appointed president of Bandidos Canada, leading Peter Edwards, the crime correspondent of The Toronto Star, to write: "Somehow, the guy who was privately hoping to get out of the club altogether had been promoted to the top position in Canada". An unassertive man, he surrendered the title back to Muscedere. The status of the "no surrender crew" was somewhat ambiguous afterwards, perhaps because it would be humiliating for Houston to have "no surrender crew" wear their Bandido patches without Houston being able to do anything about it.

=== The Shedden massacre ===
In early April 2006, Wayne Kellestine, the sergeant-at-arms of the Bandidos, accused Jamie "Goldberg" Flanz of being a police informer and demanded a "church" (mandatory meeting) at his farmhouse outside of Iona Station to discuss his allegations. Sinpopoli phoned Kriarakis about the meeting, which he did not wish to attend. Kriarakis stated the meeting did not seem very important, but that he was attending the meeting anyway. On the night of 7 April 2006, Kriarakis was driven by George "Pony" Jessome to Kellestine's farm. Upon entering Kellestine's barn, Sandham killed the Bandidos national treasurer, Luis "Chopper" Raposo. Both Kriarakis and Sinopoli attempted to flee in terror, but were shot by Kellestine. Kriarakis was shot in the abdomen while Sinopoli took a bullet in his right thigh.

As both Kellestine and Sandham ranted about their various grievances, Kriarakis started to pray in Greek while Sinopoli kept crying and saying that he did not want to die. Another member of the "no-surrender crew", Frank "the Bammer" Salerno told both Sinopoli and Kriarakis to stop their complaints, saying: "We're bikers. We're not the fucking Boy Scouts – so stop your whining!" Kriarakis kept saying that he was feeling very cold as he bled out. Kriarakis kept speaking of his wife Diane until Salerno told him: "You know how the game is played. We're not Boy Scouts". Kellestine ordered Flanz and Michael "Little Mikey" Trotta to take Raposo's corpse out of the barn and place it in the trunk of Raposo's car. As he saw Raposo's face, Krarakis screamed in horror: "Oh, my God, he's stiff, he's stiff!" Kellestine decided to take Kriarakis out to be executed while assuring him that he was going to the hospital. Kriarakis was marched out by Kellestine and his bodyguard Frank Mather. One of the killers, Dwight "Big Dee" Mushey, speaking to another one, known as M.H. due to a court some weeks later and unaware that the latter was wearing a wire for the police, said he was surprised by how much Kriarakis cried as he was marched out to be shot, saying he expected a fellow outlaw biker to be tougher.

The autopsy revealed that Kriarakis- along with Muscedere and Sinopoli- had no alcohol or drugs in their blood at the time of their murders. The autopsy showed that Kriarakis had taken seven bullets with bullets have gone under his left ear, two bullets straight through the face and one bullet through both of his shoulders plus one bullet through his chest and another bullet through his abdomen. Kriarakis's corpse was seated behind the driving wheel and his face was found to covered.

Kriarakis was buried at a Greek Orthodox church in Toronto, where Father Drakos Poul stated that Kriarakis's soul was now with the "King of Kings". Kriarakis was covered with bruises as he had been beaten while being shot. His widow Dianne cried out at his funeral: "Why, why, why? Why didn't you just leave?"

During the trial of the Shedden massacre killers in 2009, Jane Sims, the crime correspondent of The London Free Press, stated the Bandidos Motorcycle Club sounded very much like the mindlessly macho He-Men Women Haters Club from the Our Gang short films of the 1930s. Peter Edwards, the crime correspondent of The Toronto Star, agreed with her, writing the Bandidos had "grandiose rituals and overblown mythology" that were "more the stuff of fantasy and macho escapism than reality" that strongly appealed to weak, insecure men. Edwards wrote that most of the victims of the massacre such as Kriarakis were the type of weak men who were attracted to the Bandidos less because they were criminals and more out of a desire to appear important and powerful. Edwards called Kriarakis a pseudo-gangster, saying he affected the "attitude" of being a gangster as he took to strutting around with his Bandidos patch on his bikers' vest as he thought that this made him powerful. However, Edwards noted that Kriarakis worked 10 to 12 hours a day as a tow truck driver, which led him to the conclusion that Kriarakis did not make his living via crime. Edwards stated in a 2010 interview:

What struck me as bizarre was that most of the people who were murdered actually wanted out of the club, like these were murders for nothing. They couldn't bring themselves to quit, too afraid to quit. Such a bizarre contradiction, between what some may think is a power struggle when in fact (the victims) wanted out...There were differences individually. But they were all drawn to a symbol, and a pretty absurd symbol – (the Bandido was) a cartoon character stolen from a potato chip company. Like, you have a murder over that symbol? It's just bizarre. Nothing more to it, no money changed hands in the murders, nobody made a penny. To have that level of violence fought for absolutely nothing, except being in the pecking order of people who wear a cartoon character on their back. Just bizarre...Some of (the victims) were pretty nice guys, and my feeling is that if they hadn't gone to the farm that night, within five years they would have just wandered out of it again. I think most of the victims weren't real bikers, and would have gone on to regular lives.

== Books ==
- Edwards, Peter (2010), The Bandido Massacre; A True Story of Bikers, Brotherhood and Betrayal, HarperCollins Publishers Ltd, ISBN 978-0-307-37276-5
- Langton, Jerry (2010), Showdown: How the Outlaws, Hells Angels and Cops Fought for Control of the Streets, John Wiley & Sons, ISBN 978-0-470-67878-7
