= Dwight Mushey =

Canadian outlaw biker and gangster

- Born: 1968 (age 57–58); Winnipeg, Manitoba, Canada
- Other name: "Big Dee"
- Occupations: Outlaw biker, gangster, mixed martial artist
- Known for: Participant in the Shedden massacre
- Allegiance: Bandidos MC
- Conviction: First-degree murder
- Penalty: Life imprisonment

Dwight Mushey (born 1968), better known as "Big Dee", is a Canadian outlaw biker, gangster and convicted murderer currently serving a life sentence for his role in the Shedden massacre of 2006.

== Early criminal career ==
Mushey was born in Winnipeg to a family of Iranian and Filipino descent. Standing over 6'3 tall, he took up martial arts as a young man. Mushey worked as both a professional kickboxer and boxer, albeit not an especially successful one. Mushey had more success in taekwondo, which he had a second-degree black belt in. His first criminal conviction came for selling methamphetamine in his native Winnipeg. The journalist Peter Edwards described Mushey as a 6'3 man who liked to wear expensive Italian clothing and who modelled his fashion style after the character Sonny Crockett from the television show Miami Vice. Mushey is widely believed to have worked as a hitman for the Rizzuto family in Montreal and New York. Edwards wrote that Mushey's associates in the Shedden massacre, Wayne Kellestine and Michael Sandham, were both pathological liars whose yarns about their "exceptional fighting skills and sang-froid" were all fantasies with no basis in reality, but that in the case of Mushey "the stories had a chilling ring of authenticity".

Mushey was a successful businessman in Winnipeg who owned a house in the upscale neighborhood of River Heights, and was accused of importing methamphetamine into Manitoba from Ontario. The Canadian journalist Annita Arvast wrote: "Standing over six feet tall, with a slender but athletic build, long, dark hair typically neatly pulled in a ponytail, and refined, wire-rimmed glasses, he commanded respect". Mushey took in as a boarder, a MMA fighter, Marcello "Fat Ass" Aravena, who would also be convicted in the Shedden massacre trial. Mushey also became close to a man known only as M.H. due to a court order whose testimony at his trial in 2009 would send him to prison for life.

== Bandidos ==
In early 2005, Mushey was the co-owner of a nightclub and strip bar in Winnipeg, when he was recruited into the Winnipeg chapter of the Bandidos Motorcycle Club by Michael Sandham, who served as the chapter president, treasurer and secretary. On 25 June 2005, Mushey went with Sandham to first meet Wayne Kellestine at his farmhouse outside of Iona Station. During the visit to Ontario, Mushey was unhappy to discover in Toronto that the Bandidos national president Giovanni Muscedere was unwilling to give the Winnipeg chapter a full charter that would make its members "full patch" member. On 26 November 2005, Sandham and Mushey again visited Toronto to see Muscedere who refused the demand for the full charter status because of unpaid dues. Like the rest of the Winnipeg Bandidos, Mushey had a barely veiled contempt for Sandham, whom he liked to call "Little Beaker" instead of "Taz", which was Sandham's preferred nickname.

On 14 January 2006, Mushey went to Vancouver to buy a kilogram of cocaine to sell in Winnipeg together with ephedrine, a chemical used for the production of methamphetamine. Although Muscedere had forbidden the Bandidos to sell methamphetamine, Sandham together with Kellestine were planning to sell the drug. At about the same time, one of the members of the Winnipeg chapter, a man known as J.B., contacted Mushey to tell him that he discovered a news report that revealed that Sandham was a former police officer, which Mushey dismissed as merely a case of erroneous reporting. Between 20 and 22 March 2006, Mushey went with Sandham to Vancouver to hold a meeting with the American Bandido leaders in the Peace Arch Park. The Peace Arch Park straddles the American-Canadian border and is a popular meeting place for American and Canadian outlaw bikers who cannot cross the border because of their criminal records as it possible to hold a conversation without crossing the border.

=== The Shedden massacre ===
On 25 March 2006, at a meeting in Mushey's house, it was announced by Sandham that he and Mushey plus three other Bandidos would be going to Ontario. The plan was to go to Kellestine's farmhouse to "pull the patches" (i.e. take away their Bandido patches) of the "no-surrender crew" led by Muscedere. When J.B. visited Mushey's house that day he noted that he was very quiet and seemed to be engaged in planning something important. Kellestine was not informed in advance of the visit, but welcomed his guests once they arrived. On 1 April 2006, Kellestine and his visitors had dinner at the Holland House in Iona Station, where the owner, Marty Angenent, noted that Kellestine's bodyguard, Frank Mather, seemed very nervous. Angenent described Mushey as the leader of the group and the one who paid for the meal. During his time at the Kellestine farm, plans were discussed for killing Muscedere and others of the "no-surrender crew". Ultimately, it was decided to call a "church" (mandatory) meeting at the farmhouse with the aim of trapping the "no-surrender crew".

At about 4 pm on Friday, April 7, 2006, the day selected for the "church" meeting, Kellestine produced weapons from his secret gun cache. Sandham took for himself a .303 Lee–Enfield rifle, while Mushey took a shotgun. Mushey took the shotgun to Kellestine's garage to saw off part of the barrel to make it more deadly in close quarters, a decision that was later used against him at the trial to prove that murder was being planned in advance. Sandham put on a pair of white surgical gloves and handed the surgical gloves to the others; Mushey put on a pair of leather gloves over the surgical gloves and then taped them on to his hands. On the night of the meeting, Mushey was stood armed with the shotgun alongside Kellestine. As the "no-surrender crew" entered the barn at about 10 pm, Sandham used his rifle to shoot and kill Luis "Chopper" Raposo, the Bandido national treasurer. At the sound of the shooting, Mushey rushed into the barn with his shotgun. Two of the "no-surrender crew", George "Crash" Kriarakis and Paul "Big Paulie" Sinopoli, tried to run away, but were shot down and wounded by Kellestine. Kellestine ordered Mushey to stand guard over the rest of the "no-surrender" with orders to shoot Muscedere if he tried to escape. Although Mushey had a shotgun, he made no effort to stop Kellestine.

Mushey was present when Kellestine shot Muscedere followed by the others. Mushey went out of the barn with Kellestine to watch him execute Sinopoli and Michael "Little Mikey" Trotta. When it came time to execute Frank "the Bammer" Salerno, his last gesture was to shake Mushey's hands and to say to think of his newly born son Mario. The last one to be executed was Jamie "Goldberg" Flanz, who spoke about his children as he was marched out to be shot. Sandham shot Flanz in the head, but he survived the shot which blasted away much of his right cheek. As Flanz looked with a pleading expression, Sandham claimed that his gun was jammed. Mushey, who was a more experienced killer than Sandham, took his gun and proved it was not jammed by shooting Flanz between the eyes.

Mushey drove a Pontiac Grand Prix automobile belonging to one of the murder victims, Michael Trotta, which left Kellestine's farmhouse at 32196 Aberdeen Line as part of a convoy early on the morning of 8 April 2006. As Flanz's car was almost out of fuel, the driver, Frank Mather, chose to dump it in a farmer's field just outside of Shedden, which was joined by the other vehicles. Later that morning, Mushey left the Kellestine farmhouse with Sandham. Mushey was openly contemptuous of Sandham, whom he ridiculed for his inability to finish off Flanz. One of Sandham's men, who turned Crown's evidence and is only known as M.H., testified at the trial in 2009: "Dwight said that Head and Shoulders [shampoo] was good for removing gunshot residue". Mushey was facing charges of conspiracy to produce methamphetamine at the time, and one of his bail conditions was that he was to notify the police if he left Manitoba, which Mushey complied with, telling the police that he was going to Ontario on 25 March 2006. Mushey's presence in Ontario at the time of the massacre led the police to tag him as a possible suspect.

== Arrest and conviction ==
M.H., who served as the Bandidos Winnipeg sergeant-at-arms, was already a police informer. On 14 April 2006, M.H. agreed to wear a wire and to testify against the others in exchange for immunity. On 7 May 2006, M.H. became an agent informer. While wearing a wire, M.H. recorded Mushey speak with much contempt about Sandham who lied to him about his gun being jammed and commented that just before he shot Flanz that his "eyes were wide. It was almost as if he wanted to say something".

In his last month of freedom, Sandham started to call himself Bandidos national president and became caught up in a feud with the other Bandidos who disputed that claim. One of his Sandham's rivals, Pierre "Carlitto" Argaon, revealed to the American leaders of the Bandidos that Sandham was a former policeman. Sandham, in a bizarre gesture, started to pretend to be Mushey and sent out emails praising himself as Mushey. In his conversations with Mushey while wearing a wire, M.H. recorded Mushey making numerous insulting remarks about Sandham, whom he clearly had no respect for. Mushey called Sandham by the nickname he hated, "Little Beaker"" and complained about what he called Sandham's "sneaky ass fuckin'" as charged that Sandham was devious and dishonest. Mushey started to increasingly behave like he was the chapter president and began to push Sandham aside. M.H. also discovered it was easy to get Mushey to talk about the massacre by telling him that Sandham was claiming to have killed three of the men, which angered him. At one point, M.H. recorded Mushey as saying about Sandham's role in the massacre: "Probably claiming all of the glory, the fucker".

About Muscederde's killing, Mushey was recorded as saying on 12 June 2006,: "This guy, he went out like a man". During the same recording, Mushey said about Sandham: "See what I notice is, like I say, he [Sandham] takes a lot of our stories and all of a sudden it becomes his, you know what I mean? 'Like the perfect saying: "The man makes the patch, not the patch makes the man"'. That's my fuckin's sayin". Mushey dismissed Sandham as a weak man who talked tough, but was easily bullied by Kellestine. On 13 June 2006, Mushey, in response to M.H. saying that Sandham was making up his own alibi at their expense, which led Mushey to say: "If he did that, he's an idiot. The three of us should go talk to him". On 15 June 2006, Mushey was arrested at his house for first degree murder. The police believed that Mushey was planning to commit three more murders at the time and decided to arrest him at once.

During his trial in 2009, Mushey expressed much hatred for Kellestine, whom he reportedly beat in jail as punishment for being arrested so easily. Mushey enjoyed taunting Kellestine during the trial as he seemed to find angering Kellestine quite amusing. Kellestine's lawyer, Clay Powell, claimed Mushey had pressed on a note on his cell partition wall that read: "You're a dead man". Much of Mushey's defense involved allegations that M.H. had committed perjury to gain immunity. Mushey's lawyer, Michael Moon, told the court that during the massacre that Mushey had to take heart medication to prevent himself from having a heart attack, which he used to argue that Mushey was not a willing killer. Edwards wrote: "It is impossible to know how ice-cold Dwight Mushey, biker, assassin, martial artist and drug dealer, felt about portraying himself as a victim, but it cannot have been a role he was familiar with".

Shortly before the trial ended, Mushey fired Moon. Mushey's motives in firing his attorney appeared to have been to avoid appearing like a "rat". On 21 October 2009, Mushey and Gardiner fired their lawyers and stated to Justice Thomas Heeny they were content not to have legal counsel for the rest of the trial. Under the outlaw biker code, bikers never "rat" on their colleagues with for example both Frank Lenti and Mario Parente serving long prison sentences rather than accept offers of immunity from the Crown in exchange for testifying against other outlaw bikers. Both Hicks and Moon had blamed the murders on Kellestine and Sandham, which was viewed as "ratting" in the outlaw biking world, and Mushey and Gardiner seemed to have been trying to avoid that impression.

On 29 October 2009, Mushey was found guilty on 7 counts of first degree murder, which led him to bow politely to the jury before he was led of the courtroom. Mushey is currently serving a life sentence with no chance of parole at Stony Mountain Penitentiary in Manitoba.

== Books ==
- Arvast, Anita (2012). Bloody Justice The Truth Behind the Bandido Massacre at Shedden. Toronto: John Wiley & Sons. ISBN 9781118157459.
- Edwards, Peter (2010), The Bandido Massacre; A True Story of Bikers, Brotherhood and Betrayal, HarperCollins Publishers Ltd, ISBN 978-0307372765
- Langton, Jerry (2010), Showdown: How the Outlaws, Hells Angels and Cops Fought for Control of the Streets, John Wiley & Sons, ISBN 978-0470678787
