= Frank Mather (biker) =

Canadian outlaw biker and gangster

- Born: 1973 (age 52–53); New Brunswick, Canada
- Occupations: Outlaw biker; gangster
- Known for: Participant in the Shedden massacre
- Allegiance: Bandidos MC
- Convictions: First-degree murder and manslaughter
- Penalty: Life imprisonment

Frank Mather (born 1973) is a Canadian outlaw biker and gangster serving a life sentence for his role in the Shedden massacre of 7 April 2006.

== Career criminal ==
Mather is a career criminal with a long criminal record for home invasions, having been convicted eight times and served three years in prison in his native New Brunswick. During one of his prison terms, he met Wayne "Weiner" Kellestine. In early 2006, Mather was on parole after being convicted for attempting to steal a truck and had been evicted from a motel in London, Ontario after failing to pay for his room. Facing homelessness, Mather contacted Kellestine and asked him to live at his farmhouse. Kellestine agreed provided that Mather serve as his bodyguard. Peter Edwards, the crime correspondent of The Toronto Star, described Mather as a muscular man with a swastika tattoo on the back of his neck who "never seemed to learn from his mistakes" as he kept being arrested and convicted for numerous home invasions in New Brunswick and Ontario.

Kellestine provided Mather with a home for himself and his pregnant girlfriend, Stefanie. Mather was a Bandidos supporter and hoped that Kellestine would sponsor him into the club. When Kellestine decided to execute the "no-surrender crew", as the Toronto Bandido chapter called themselves, Mather went along with his plans and did not contact the police. On 1 April 2006, Kellestine together with Michael "Taz" Sandham, Marcello "Fat Ass" Aravena, Dwight "Big Dee" Mushey and Mather all had dinner at the Holland House restaurant in Iona Station, where the owner, Marty Angenent, noted that Mather seemed very nervous and twitchy about what was being discussed over the dinner.

=== Shedden massacre ===
At the beginning of April 2006, Kellestine accused one of the "no surrender crew", Jamie "Goldberg" Flanz, of being a police informer. As Flanz was Jewish and the rabidly anti-Semitic Kellestine hated him for that, the Bandidos national president Giovanni "Boxer" Muscedere did not take the allegation seriously, but to settle the matter, it was agreed that the "no surrender crew" would visit Kellestine's farm to discuss his claims. On the night of 6 April 2006, Mather's girlfriend Stefanie together with Kellestine's wife and daughter left Kellestine's farmhouse under the grounds that no women could be present at a "church" (a mandatory meeting for bikers) that was to take place the next night.

When the "no-surrender crew" led by Muscedere arrived at the farmhouse at about 10 pm on the night of 7 April 2006, Mather was armed and waiting for them. When Sandham shot and killed Luis "Chopper" Raposo as he entered Kellestine's barn, Mather rushed into the barn with Aravena to see what had happened. Kellestine ordered Mather to search the vehicles of the "no-surrender crew" for weapons and anything of value. Mather also searched the possessions brought into the barn by the Toronto chapter and found a sawed-off shotgun in a gym bag. When George "Crash" Kriarakis was taken out from the barn to be shot, Mather walked alongside Kellestine and Kriarakis. Mather did not kill anyone during the massacre, but served as a guard as Kellestine executed the "no-surrender crew". Mather was present when Flanz was killed.

After the massacre, Mather chose to stay at Kellestine's farmhouse despite an offer to go with Sandham to Winnipeg. Mather's decision to stay later became an important point at his trial in 2009 as the Crown argued that his willingness to continue living at the Kellestine farm provided that he was not afraid of Kellestine as he claimed at his trial. Kellestine had decided to dump the vehicles of the victims and the corpses in Kitchener out of the hope that the police would blame the Hells Angels for the massacre. Mather was the driver of an Infiniti automobile that had belonged to Flanz that had the corpse of Paul "Big Paulie" Sinopoli in the trunk. Sinopoli was morbidly obese and his corpse, which barely fitted into the trunk, nearly rolled out several times as Mather drove up Highway 401. When Mather found that the Infiniti was almost out of gas, he decided to abandon the vehicle at a randomly chosen farmer's field outside of Shedden, thus giving the massacre its name. Kellestine was angry with Mather for leaving the bodies so close to his farm, but Mather defended himself by saying: "I was running out of gas in the car. I had to leave them where they were". Mather assisted Kellestine with cleaning up the crime scene and destroying evidence. On the night of 8 April 2006, Mather was arrested along with Kellestine by the Ontario Provincial Police (OPP) and charged with first-degree murder.

Mather claimed not to be a member of the Bandidos, but the police found a probationary Bandidos vest in Mather's room together with a video of Mather wearing a Bandidos supporter T-shirt at one of Kellestine's parties. Mather was charged with "constructive first-degree murder", meaning that although he had not killed anyone himself, the Crown alleged that he had been aware of the plans to commit murder, and that by assisting the killers by standing guard he was just as guilty of first-degree murder as those who did the actual killing. "Constructive first-degree murder" is a difficult charge to prove in court, and a number of lawyers felt that Mather had a strong chance of acquittal. Many legal experts felt that the Crown Attorney prosecuting the case, Keven Gowdey, would have much difficulty in persuading the jury to convict Mather of "constructive first-degree murder".

== Trial ==
During the trial that lasted from 30 March 2009 to 29 October 2009, Mather was described as looking more fit than he been when had served as Kellestine's bodyguard. Mather remained loyal to Kellestine during the trial and phoned him on 1 May 2009 to wish him a happy birthday. When Sandham testified at the trial starting on 9 September 2009 and cast himself as the victim, portraying all of the others as bloodthirsty psychopaths with himself as an alleged heroic "undercover" policeman out to stop the Bandidos, Mather was visibly angry.

Greg Leslie, the lawyer for Mather, argued to the jury: "Frank Mather made a mistake. He became friends with Wayne Kellestine. That's it". Leslie argued: "He's not a Bandido. He's not even associated with the Bandidos...Why would Frank Mather be associated with a mass execution? What's in it for him?" The Crown Attorney prosecuting the case, Keven Gowdey, argued to the jury that Mather was guilty of first-degree murder as: "People who intentionally help or encourage other to kill are as guilty as those who pull the trigger...This was a concerted effort by the shooters and their helpers; executioners and their henchmen". Gowdey argued that on the night of 7 April 2006 the "farm crew", as he called the killers, had armed themselves in advance which clearly suggested the massacre was a premediated act, instead of the random unplanned act that the defense lawyers claimed that it was. Gowdey argued that Mather stood guard as Kellestine executed the victims one-by-one and despite having a gun on his person made no effort to stop the massacre, which led him to argue to the jury that Mather was just as much guilty as Kellestine and should be convicted of first-degree murder.

On 29 October 2009, Mather was found guilty of seven counts of first-degree murder and one count of manslaughter . He is currently serving a life sentence with no chance of parole at a prison in New Brunswick.

== Books ==
- Arvast, Anita (2012). Bloody Justice The Truth Behind the Bandido Massacre at Shedden. Toronto: John Wiley & Sons. ISBN 9781118157459.
- Edwards, Peter (2010), The Bandido Massacre; A True Story of Bikers, Brotherhood and Betrayal, HarperCollins Publishers Ltd, ISBN 978-0307372765
- Langton, Jerry (2010), Showdown: How the Outlaws, Hells Angels and Cops Fought for Control of the Streets, John Wiley & Sons, ISBN 978-0470678787
