= Michael Trotta =

Canadian outlaw biker

Michael Trotta (1974-7 April 2006), better known as "Little Mikey" was a Canadian outlaw biker and gangster, one of the victims of the Shedden massacre.

== Bandido ==
Trotta was born in Milton, Ontario. Trotta was married with two children and worked as a used trailer salesman in Mississauga. Trotta's nickname of "Little Mikey" was a reference to his diminutive stature.

A close friend the Bandidos Toronto chapter president, Frank Salerno, Trotta joined the Bandidos in October 2004. Trotta felt that joining the Bandidos would improve his social standing, but those who knew him felt that he was out-of-place in the Bandidos. In January 2005, Trotta became a "full patch" member after less than 3 months, which was an extremely rapid rise. In June 2005, Trotta was promoted to the rank of manager and came to lose interest in the Bandidos, feeling that he was now more important as a manager instead of a mere salesman. That same month, Trotta and his wife purchased a house in Milton. Trotta came to feel that he might be better off as a manager rather than with associating with criminals. Trotta was a "prospect" (the secondary level in an outlaw biker club). In January 2005, Trotta signed the lease for a clubhouse for the Bandidos on Jefferson Avenue in Toronto, but in March 2005, the landlord refused to accept to their rent cheque and offered to refund their first and last months' rent if the Bandidos just vacated the premise immediately. Trotta accepted this demand despite its illegality and seemed almost happy about the termination of the lease.

== Shedden massacre ==
At the beginning of April 2006, Wayne Kellestine, the Bandido Toronto's sergeant-at-arms, accused one of the Toronto chapter, Jamie Flanz, of being a police informer. The Bandidos national president Giovanni Muscedere agreed that a meeting would be held at Kellestine's farmhouse to discuss the allegations. On night of 7 April 2006, Trotta made the trip to Kellestine's farm.

Upon entering the barn, one of the Toronto chapter, Luis "Chopper" Raposo was shot and killed by Michael Sandham of the Winnipeg chapter. Kellestine fired his gun in the air and shouted: "Everybody get on the floor! Nobody move! I'm here to pull your patches. This is being done by the orders of the States [the U.S leadership of the Bandidos]". During the confusion, someone punched Trotta in the face with a blunt object, leaving his face bruised and battered. Kellestine ordered Trotta to write down a list of the addresses of the captives and to catalogue all Bandido property in their possession. Trotta's left eye was very badly swollen and he was in much pain as he wrote down the list at a piece of brown paper that Kellestine had provided.

Afterwards, Kellestine had Flanz and Trotta wrap the corpse of Raposo in a used rug that was lying around in his barn and placed in Muscedere's car. As the members of the "no-surrender crew" were marched one by one to be shot, the mood in the barn grew more darker amongst the doomed men. Kellestine ordered Flanz and Trotta mop the floor of the barn with water and bleach. Trotta was the penultimate victim of the massacre as Kellestine ordered him of the barn and to sit in an automobile alongside the corpses of Paul Sinopoli and Salerno. After he sat down in the Infiniti car, Kellestine shot him. The autopsy of Trotta's corpse showed that he had been smoking marijuana the night of his murder.

During the trial of the Shedden massacre killers in 2009, Jane Sims, the crime correspondent of The London Free Press, stated the Bandidos Motorcycle Club sounded like the mindlessly macho He-Men Women Haters Club from the Our Gang short films of the 1930s. Peter Edwards, the crime correspondent of The Toronto Star, agreed with her, writing the Bandidos with their "grandiose rituals and overblown mythology" seemed "more the stuff of fantasy and macho escapism than real life" that appealed to weak, insecure men. Edwards wrote that all of the victims such as Trotta were the type of weak men who were attracted to the Bandidos less because they were criminals and more out of a desire to appear important and powerful.

== Books ==
- Arvast, Anita (2012). Bloody Justice The Truth Behind the Bandido Massacre at Shedden. Toronto: John Wiley & Sons. ISBN 9781118157459.
- Edwards, Peter (2010), The Bandido Massacre; A True Story of Bikers, Brotherhood and Betrayal, HarperCollins Publishers Ltd, ISBN 978-0307372765
- Langton, Jerry (2010), Showdown: How the Outlaws, Hells Angels and Cops Fought for Control of the Streets, John Wiley & Sons, ISBN 978-0470678787
