= M.H. (police informer) =

Canadian police informer

M.H. is a Canadian former outlaw biker, gangster and police informer who played a key role in convicting the accused in the Shedden massacre trial of 2009. Due to a court order, M.H.'s name cannot be revealed and he is only known by his abbreviation.

== Bandidos ==
M.H. was born in Winnipeg, Manitoba. M.H. had dropped out of school in grade 10 and can only read at a grade 5 level due to a learning disability. M.H. was a drug dealer who lived on welfare, receiving $1,000/per month from the province of Manitoba in welfare, while making about $3,000/per day selling cocaine. Despite his claims to be physically unable to work, M.H. went to the gym often. M.H. was friends with the owner of a nightclub, Dwight "Big Dee" Mushey. In the summer of 2005, he joined the Bandidos Winnipeg chapter led by Michael "Taz" Sandham and became the sergeant-at-arms of the Winnipeg chapter. M.H. also worked as a police informer, selling the Winnipeg police information about the gang. M.H. did not own nor how to ride a motorcycle, which he testified was quite the norm as he stated the Bandidos were not a motorcycle club, but rather a criminal organization posing as a motorcycle club. M.H. was not impressed with Sandham and only joined the Bandidos because Ron Burling, a career criminal, recommended him. The Canadian journalists Anita Arvast described M.H. as a "stocky man".

In March 2006, M.H. went with Sandham to the farm of Wayne "Wiener" Kellestine to assist with plans to "pull the patches" of the Toronto Bandido chapter on the orders of the American Bandido leaders. While staying at the Kellestine farm, M.H. went to the closest pay phone at a gas station to call Constable Timothy Diack of the Winnipeg police to leave a message on his voice mail saying the charter of the Toronto Bandidos was going to "be pulled" and there was something else being planned that he was not comfortable with. M.H had been working as a part-time police informer for several years and Diack was his contact. M.H. was not able to contact Diack and left a message on his voicemail.

As part of the plans for the massacre, M.H. armed himself with a gun from Kellestine's gun cache. M.H. was armed and with Kellestine in his barn on the night of 7 April 2006. M.H. was armed with a Remington Wingmaster pump-action shotgun and guarding the back of Kellestine's barn. M.H. later testified in 2009 that he heard shots which "sounded like popcorn" and rushed into the barn to find Luis "Chopper" Raposo of the Toronto chapter dead and the other seven members of the Toronto chapter lying face down on the floor of the barn. M.H. joined Kellestine in escorting George "Pony" Jessome from the barn and was present when Kellestine shot Jessome twice. M.H. drove a tow truck to attach to the car of Jamie "Goldberg" Flanz to assist with the removal of the vehicles of the Toronto chapter. When Frank "the Bammer" Salerno was taken out to be shot, he tried to shake hands with M.H. who refused. M.H. was present when Flanz was killed and later testified that he was not impressed with the way that Sandham had proved incapable of finishing off Flanz by lying that his gun was jammed. After the massacre, M.H. went back to Winnipeg with Sandham. During his trip to Winnipeg, M.H. was already considering making a plea bargain with the Crown for immunity for his role in the massacre.

=== Agent source informer ===
Upon his return to Winnipeg, M.H. met with Diack who wanted to know what he knew about the massacre. M.H. admitted that he had been at the Kellestine farmhouse, but lied about being involved in the massacre, saying that he left Kellestine farm on the morning of 7 April 2006. On 14 April 2006, M.H. again met with Diack who told him that the police knew he had been involved in the massacre. Diack told M.H. he could either wear a wire for the police or be charged with first degree murder. M.H lied to Diack by claiming that the Hells Angels had committed the massacre. Diack told M.H. "either you're on the bus or you're under the bus".

On 16 April 2006, M.H. met with Diack together with Detectives Jeff Gateman and Constable Mark Loader of the Ontario Provincial Police (OPP) at the Fairmount Hotel in Winnipeg. M.H. was expecting $750,000 for wearing a wire for the police, a demand that was refused. It was agreed that M.H would receive total immunity, $1,300/per month for the rest of his life, and free rent in exchange for which he would wear a wire and turn Crown's evidence. The police told M.H. that he had to stop lying and now tell the truth about the massacre. M.H. signed an immunity agreement with the Attorney General of Ontario giving him complete immunity from prosecution in exchange for his testimony. The agreement also stated if M.H. were to commit perjury during the trial, the agreement would be null and void.

On 7 May 2006, M.H. became an official agent source informer with a formal contact committing him to testify in court. While wearing a wire, M.H. collected much information about the massacre by talking to Mushey and Marcello "Fat Ass" Aravena. M.H. discovered it was easy to get Mushey to talk about his role in the massacre by telling him that Sandham was now claiming to have killed three of the victims, leading Mushey to say: "Probably claiming all the glory, the fucker". While working out at the Freight House gym in Winnipeg on 12 June 2006, M.H. recorded Mushey about the killing of Giovanni "Boxer" Muscedere: "This guy, he went out like a man...He laughed. Went out like a man." On the basis of the evidence collected by M.H., Sandham, Mushey and Aravena were all arrested on 16 June 2006.

== Trial ==
At the preliminary hearing (the Canadian equivalent to a grand jury) in January 2007, M.H. served as the Crown's star witness. The journalists covering the hearing nicknamed M.H. "Mr. Potato Head" on the account of his appearance. The lawyers for the accused such as Don Crawford accused M.H. of being the killer. At the trial of the accused in 2009, M.H. served as the star witness for the Crown, starting his testimony on 16 July 2009. M.H. broke down in tears on the stand, admitting that he had done nothing to stop the massacre, though denying that he killed anyone. During the trial, the defense lawyers accused M.H. of killing Luis Raposo and George Jessome with a shotgun, but the forensic expert Dr. Toby Rose testified that Raposo and Jessome were killed by bullets, not shotgun pellets, which supported M.H.s version of events. At one point, M.H. admitted that he had immunity, but: "I'll be tried some day in a higher court than this".

M.H. summed up the state of the Canadian Bandidos to the court:

They were at the very bottom rung of biker gangs. Some were in their 40s but still lived with their parents. They were not making any money, many of them had been rejected by the Hells Angels and half of them didn't even own a motorbike.

The lawyers for the accused often attacked M.H.'s character. Michael Moon, the lawyer for Mushey, accused M.H. of being a liar and fraudster with "a long history of loathsomely selfish behavior" as the Arvast summed up his thesis. Moon noted that M.H. lived on welfare and a disability pension, but went to the gym on a regular basis, which led him to label M.H. as a man who lived by lies. Moon called M.H. "Rainman", describing him as like the idiot savant character from the film of the same name.

The American biker expert Thomas Baker wrote that M.H. was by his own admission a drug dealer and a killer who knew about the plans for the massacre beforehand and did nothing, and he only cut a deal with the Crown to avoid going to prison, making him into the most unsavoury of witnesses for the Crown.

The Crown Attorney prosecuting the case, Kevin Gowdey, admitted in his final address that M.H. was very far from a model citizen, but all of the forensic evidence supported his version of events. The trial ended on 29 October 2009 with the all the accused being found guilty. Marilyn Salerno, the mother of Frank Salerno, in his victim impact statement to the court stated: "I would like to thank M.H. for stepping forward, at great risk to his safety and to safety of his family, to do the right thing". M.H. is currently living in witness protection.

== Books ==
- Arvast, Anita (2012). Bloody Justice The Truth Behind the Bandido Massacre at Shedden. Toronto: John Wiley & Sons. ISBN 9781118157459.
- Baker, Thomas (2014), Biker Gangs and Transnational Organized Crime, Routledge, ISBN 978-1317524113
- Edwards, Peter (2010), The Bandido Massacre; A True Story of Bikers, Brotherhood and Betrayal, HarperCollins Publishers Ltd, ISBN 978-0307372765
- Langton, Jerry (2010), Showdown: How the Outlaws, Hells Angels and Cops Fought for Control of the Streets, John Wiley & Sons, ISBN 978-0470678787
- Schnedier, Stephen (2009), Iced: The Story of Organized Crime in Canada, John Wiley & Sons, ISBN 978-0470835005
