= Frank Salerno =

Canadian biker and criminal

Francesco Salerno (1962 – 7 April 2006), better known as "Frank the Bammer", was a Canadian biker. He was one of the victims of the Shedden massacre.

== Loner ==
Salerno was born in Toronto, the son of a car dealer. Salerno's experienced troubles in his youth when his parents divorced. Salerno joined the Loners Motorcycle Club as an young man. Salerno had a criminal record, with more than thirty convictions for fraud and theft. Salerno once caused the Loners' clubhouse in Richmond Hill to burn down after falling asleep while he was supposed to be watching a fire. On 24 November 1998, Salerno robbed a Hy & Zel's drugstore in Niagara Falls, stealing 13 cartons of cigarettes. On 28 April 2000, he was found guilty of theft over $5,000 over the incident and sentenced to twenty days in prison.

== Bandidos ==
In December 2001, Salerno joined the Bandidos. Salerno became very close to another Bandido and fellow Italian-Canadian Giovanni Muscedere. Salerno and Muscedere often talked in Italian and seemed to understand each very well. When Muscedere became the Bandidos Canadian national president in June 2002, he appointed Salerno the president of the Toronto chapter.

In 2002-2004, Salerno became locked in a feud with Frank Lenti.

In October 2002, Salerno married a woman named Stephanie. Stephanie Salerno owned a successful beauty salon, whose income allowed the couple to own a house in a middle-class district of Oakville.

In late March 2006, Salerno sent Pierre "Carlitto" Aragon to Winnipeg to see Michael Sandham, the president of the Winnipeg chapter and Edwards wrote that "...the police would later hear that Carlitto and Stone were in Winnipeg to kill Sandham". Salerno had plans to install Argaon as the new Winnipeg chapter president to remove Sandham, who had emerged as a troubler-maker within the Bandidos.

== The Shedden massacre ==
At the beginning of April 2006, Kellestine accused one of the Toronto chapter, Jamie Flanz, of being a police informer. Muscedere agreed that a meeting would be held at Kellestine's farmhouse to discuss the allegations. In a phone call that listened into by the police, Salerno told the Toronto chapter treasurer Paul Sinopoli that if he failed to attend the meeting and bring some $550 he owed in arrears to the club he would be expelled.

As the Toronto chapter entered Kellestine's barn at about 10 pm on 7 April 2006, Sandham shot and killed Luis Raposo. At the sound of the shots, both Sinopoli and Kriarakis attempted to flee, but Kellestine shot both of them down with Kriarakis taking a bullet to the abdomen while Sinpoli was shot in the thigh. During the same exchange of gunfire, Salerno was also hit by a bullet in his leg. As both Sinopoli and Kriarakis complained of the pain caused by their wounds, Salerno told them: "We're bikers. We're not the fucking Boy Scouts, so stop your whining". Despite the pain caused by the bullet wound in his leg, Salerno refused to complain.

When Salerno was taken out to be shot, he offered to shake hands with his killers. He shook hands with Dwight Mushey while another man known as M.H. and Marcello Aravena refused as the latter said: "I'm not shaking your hand!". Salerno's last words were "Make sure you guys tell my family where my body is."

== Books ==
- Edwards, Peter (2010), The Bandido Massacre; A True Story of Bikers, Brotherhood and Betrayal, HarperCollins Publishers Ltd, ISBN 978-0307372765
- Langton, Jerry (2010), Showdown: How the Outlaws, Hells Angels and Cops Fought for Control of the Streets, John Wiley & Sons, ISBN 978-0470678787
