= Frank Lenti =

Canadian outlaw biker and criminal (1947–2026)

- Frank Lenti in 2019
- Born: Francesco Lenti; June 21, 1947; Woodbridge, Ontario, Canada
- Died: October 31, 2026 (aged 79); Toronto, Ontario, Canada
- Resting place: Holy Cross Catholic Cemetery, Thornhill
- Other name: "Cisco"
- Occupations: Outlaw biker, gangster
- Years active: 1970–2014
- Known for: Founding the Loners
- Spouse: Maria Lenti
- Children: 9
- Allegiance: Satan's Choice MC (–1978); Rebels MC (1978–1979); Loners MC (1979–1981, 1984-1994); Diablos MC (1994–1995); Bandidos MC (2002–2004; 2006–2007)
- Conviction: Manslaughter (2008)
- Penalty: 6 years' imprisonment (2008)

Francesco "Cisco" Lenti (June 21, 1947 – October 31, 2026) was a Canadian outlaw biker and gangster, and the founder of the Loners Motorcycle Club.

== Satan's Choice ==
Lenti was born in Woodbridge, Ontario to Italian immigrant parents. The journalist Jerry Langton wrote in 2010 "...that even by Canadian biker standards, Lenti was a strange guy. Vain, constantly preening, and prone to violent temper tantrums, he had a habit of giving up on projects that didn't exactly go his way". The journalist Yves Lavigne wrote in 1999 about: "...that social butterfly of the biker underworld, the promiscuous Frank Lenti, who over twenty years wore the colors of nearly half a dozen Toronto gangs. The temperamental Lenti flitted from gang to gang when he didn't get his way". Lenti's frequent changes in membership of outlaw biker clubs gave him the nickname of the "Velcro biker". Lenti was never a member of the Mafia, but he had friendships with several Mafiosi over the years such as Domenic Musitano of the Musitano family of Hamilton.

He started out as a member of the Satan's Choice Motorcycle Club and was one of the first members of Satan's Choice together with his friend Cecil Kirby to visit the Satan's Choice's national president Bernie Guindon in jail at the Algoma Treatment and Remand Centre in Sault. St. Marie after he was arrested at an Oba Lake drug bust in August 1975. Lenti had Mafia connections and it was he who recommended Kirby as a hitman to Cosimo Commisso, saying that Kirby was good with bombs and guns, though he also warned that Kirby was not to be completely trusted as he was of non-Italian descent, saying "Remember, he's not one of us". According to Kirby, Lenti was involved in "million-dollar burglary" in 1977 and recruited him. However, the plot ended with Kirby getting "nothing". An ambitious man, Lenti never rose above the rank of prospect in Satan's Choice, causing him to leave in 1978 and join the Rebels.

Kirby turned police informer in 1980. In 1981, Kirby told Lenti that he should leave Toronto for a while as he was about to reveal much to the Crown. After leaving the Satan's Choice, Lenti joined the Rebels before founding a new club, the Loners, which collapsed in 1981. In 1982, when Kirby started to testify against the Mafia figures who employed him as a hitman, his friend Lenti fled to Italy where he lived for the next two years. Lenti recalled in an interview in 2019: "Me and Kirby used to be together a lot. When he started singing I said, ‘I’d better go take a tour.’" Lenti lived in Perugia, where he associated with the Italian Hells Angels.

== The Loners ==
Lenti founded a new club, also called the Loners in 1984 in York Region after his return to Canada, recruiting mainly from his fellow Italian-Canadians. Lenti designed the "rather elaborate and bizarre" patch for his club featuring a half-werewolf, half-horned skull creature. A disproportionate number of the Loners were Italian-Canadians from middle-class families who saw themselves as being more polished and sophisticated than other outlaw bikers. By start of the 1990s, the Loners had chapters in Toronto, Woodbridge, Richmond Hill, Windsor, and London. Unusually for a Canadian outlaw biker club, the Loners had chapters abroad with one in Portugal and seven in Italy, having chapters in Naples, Messina, Salerno, Reggio Calabria, Brolo, Avellino and Isernia. The Loners were a successful club under Lenti's leadership despite the way that other gangs predictably mocked the Loners as "the Losers". By the late 1980s, the Loners were the third largest biker gang in Ontario, being exceeded only by the Outlaws and Satan's Choice. Langton wrote that Lenti was also personally successful in two "industries bikers tend to admire-a stripper/escort talent agency and a tow truck firm".

On June 16, 1993, Lenti was approached by Walter "the Nurget" Stadnick, the president of the Canadian Hells Angels at a bikers convention in Wasaga Beach with an offer to have the Loners "patch over" to the Hells Angels. Stadnick was looking to have the Hells Angels expand into Ontario by "patching over" one of the stronger existing Ontario outlaw clubs, and after being turned down by Bernie Guindon of Satan's Choice, decided to make a friendly takeover offer to Lenti of the Loners. Joining Stadnick was David "Wolf" Carroll who wore a T-shirt with the SS runes reading "Filthy Few Denmark", which Lenti understood as Carroll's way of saying he committed a murder in Denmark. Lenti refused the offer to "patch over". The Hells Angels offered Lenti further chances to "patch over" several times in 1993 and 1994, but he declined, instead offering Stadnick a chance to join the Loners. Lenti found Stadnick arrogant, noting that Stadnick had told him that two Loners were police informers, a report that was true, but grated with him as he felt that Stadnick was trying to control the Loners from afar. Lenti has been faithful to the outlaw code, serving prison sentences rather than accept offers of immunity from the Crown in exchange for testifying against other outlaw bikers, making him a figure of respect within the outlaw biker world.

== The Diablos ==
Subsequently, Lenti was expelled from his own club for the second time in 1994, and founded a new club, the Diablos Motorcycle Gang that lost a biker war later in 1995 against the Loners. Langton wrote that Lenti was expelled for stealing from his club while Lavinge stated that his expulsion was due to him throwing a "temper tantrum" too many. Lenti called the Diablos a motorcycle gang instead of a club, saying: "I'll show them who the real fucking gang is". After being expelled from the Loners, Lenti located the clubhouse of Diablos only a half block away from the Loners' clubhouse on Kipling Avenue in Woodbridge, which was considered a provocation. The Diablos were courted by Satan's Choice as the competition for the control of the drug trade in the Toronto area had grown very intense, and even the small territory controlled by the Diablos made them worth courting.

On July 18, 1995, a Diablo threw a homemade bomb at a tow truck owned by a Loner while two Diablos were shot and wounded by the Loners. Attacks were made with rocket launchers on clubhouses owned by Satan's Choice and the Loners. On August 25, 1995, Lenti was badly wounded by a bomb planted in his car, which gave him the unflattering epithet of "the half-assed biker" as he lost one of his buttocks. Lenti was lucky to survive the car bombing, but ended up facing weapons charges afterwards as the Toronto police discovered a handgun and a loaded machinegun in his car. Lenti told detective Angelo DeLorenzi about the loaded submachine gun and 9-millimetre handgun found in the ruins of his car: "I was using them for my kinda people. I wasn't using them for law-abiding citizens". Ever since the 1995 bombing, Lenti has walked with a limp and has often had to use a cane. The attempted assassination marked the end of the biker war, but the mayor of Toronto, Barbara Hall, unaware that the war was over, attempted to ban all outlaw bikers from Toronto. In an interview in 2019, Lenti claimed that the Rizzuto family of Montreal tried to recruit him in the 1990s, an offer he declined on the basis that he was an outlaw biker, not a Mafiosi.

== The Bandidos ==
In the fall of 2002 Lenti joined the Canadian Bandidos, which they regarded as a gain as he was a more experienced outlaw biker than the national president Giovanni "John the Boxer" Muscedere. Another experienced outlaw biker who joined the Bandidos was James "Ripper" Fullager, who had been active in outlaw biking since the 1960s and whose home in Toronto was a favourite gathering place for the Bandidos, where Fullager recounted his past adventures and gave them advice. The Victoria Day weekend in May is the normal start of the riding season for outlaw bikers in Canada. For Victoria Day in 2003, it turned out that of the Bandidos only Muscedere, Lenti, Glenn "Wrongway" Atkinson and George "Crash" Kriarakis actually owned working Harley-Davidson motorcycles, which humiliated Lenti who bitterly complained about "bikers without bikes". Lenti was close to the Bandidos' mentor James "Ripper" Fullanger, who always called him "Old Frank" despite the fact that Fullanger was the older man. However, Fullanger was annoyed when Lenti called the Bandidos a biker gang rather than a club.

In June 2003, when Kriarakis was eating in a restaurant in Woodbridge where he was surrounded by a dozen Hells Angels and was ordered to go out to the parking lot to be beaten as Woodbridge was considered to be "their" territory. One of Kriarakis's friends called Lenti on his cellphone, who promptly raced off in his tow truck to help his biker "brother" while Kriarakis was badly beaten up in the parking lot. Upon arriving, Lenti was furious to see that Kriarakis had called the police to report the assault, telling him that outlaw bikers never report to the police a crime committed by other outlaw bikers, even against themselves. At a meeting at Fullager's house, Kriarakis was taken to task for his violation of the outlaw biker code, which just publicly humiliated the Toronto Bandido chapter. An outlaw biker from Edmonton, Joe "Crazy House" Morin of the Rebels, who was considering "patching over" to join the Bandidos expressed much doubt after the Kriarakis incident, saying the only members of the Toronto chapter who impressed him were Atkinson and Lenti. Lenti disliked Frank "the Bammer" Salerno, the president of the Bandidos Toronto chapter, who was a heroin addict while Lenti refused to even smoke cigarettes, saying using drugs was for weak men. When Salerno gave himself a bastone tattoo, which Lenti saw as his own personal mark, Lenti proceeded to beat up Salerno and told him to have the tattoo covered up. When Lenti found insulting comments about himself on the Bandidos website, he discovered that the IP address of the poster was located in an area where Salerno lived, which led him to accuse Salerno of posting the comments. Salerno broke down in tears and told Lenti "please, please, please" not gouge out his eyes as a punishment.

When Michael Sandham of Winnipeg joined the Bandidos in 2004, Lenti was highly suspicious of him, saying he kept hearing rumors that Sandham used to be a policeman and that he had been rejected by the Outlaws for that reason, and assigned the Bandido national sergeant-at-arms Wayne Kellestine to investigate him. Lenti further noted that Sandham had no tattoos, which was unusual as almost all outlaw bikers have many tattoos on their bodies, his demeanor was like that of a policeman doing a very clumsy impression of an outlaw biker, and that Sandham seemed like the sort of man who would have "sucked up" to the high school bully rather than stand up for himself. However, Kellestine reported that the rumors were not true, and Sandham had never been a policeman.

In November 2004, Lenti quit the Bandidos, saying that Muscedere was addicted to cocaine and Kellestine was insane, and he was tired of dealing with both of them. Unlike Glenn "Wongway" Atkinson, who was beaten bloody by Muscedere and Kellestine, Lenti was not beaten when he turned in his jacket with the Bandido patch as he had a fearsome reputation as a fighter who was known for his habit of gouging out the eyes of his enemies. Peter Edwards, the crime correspondent of The Toronto Star, wrote: "No one could count on coming out on top in a fight with Lenti...and guys who went toe to toe with the veteran biker sometimes came away with one less functioning eye". Lenti almost provoked a fight with Muscedere, whom he no longer respected, and only the intervention of others prevented the two men from coming to blows. Lenti was a living legend within Ontario outlaw biker circles and his resignation was a great blow to the already waning prestige of the club. To save face, Kellestine sent out an email to the other Bandidos saying that Lenti had been expelled. The Hells Angels considered making an offer to Lenti with the notes for November 2004 Central Canada committee reading: "Vote on Frank issue was Yes 72 No 69 did not pass".

Lenti attempted to keep the Bandidos operating in Canada after the Shedden massacre. On May 24, 2006, Lenti rejoined the Bandidos and started to push aside both Sandham and his rival Pierre "Carlito" Aragon who were both competing to be national president. Lenti had one of his associates send Sandham an email saying it was time for the Canadian Bandidos "to stop looking like assholes in front of the USA and get along", meaning that Sandham should step aside to allow Lenti to run the Canadian Bandidos. Sandham sent back an email saying "You are asking me to throw down my patch. Over bullshit!!". However, Lenti was a living legend within Canadian outlaw biker circles with close links to the Mafia and a habit of gouging out the eyes of his enemies, and Sandham was so utterly terrified of him that he agreed to stop calling himself president of Bandidos Canada, and allow Lenti that honor. Sandham liked to act the tough guy, but Edwards wrote: "As it turned out, all anyone really had to do was tell him to get lost in an unfriendly tone of voice, and he would have disappeared."

On September 28, 2006, two Hells Angels, Remond "Ray" Akleh of Ottawa and Mark Stephenson of Oshawa, were charged with ordering another Angel, Steven Gault, to kill Lenti. Unknown to Akleh and Stephenson, Gault was secretly a police informer. Gault was a career criminal who specialized in cheating seniors out of their life savings and who once bit off the ear of a man in a bar fight. Gault, a member of Satan's Choice joined the Hells Angels in 2000 with the sole aim of selling them out to the Crown. Gault received a $1 million payment from the Ontario government in exchange for testifying to the alleged murder plot. Lenti, who remained true to the outlaw biker code, refused an offer of police protection when informed of the alleged plot, but he did start carrying around a handgun, saying he would get the Bandidos "off the ground" after the massacre.

Shortly after midnight on December 2, 2006, four Hells Angels showed up at the Club Pro Adult Entertainment strip club and bar in Vaughan, where Lenti worked as a security guard and bouncer. The owner of Club Pro Adult Entertainment, Domenic "Mimmo" Marciano, described Lenti as a "cooler", saying "He was kind of the buffer, the cooler, to eliminate the other element that we didn't want". The Angels were led by David "White Dread" Buchanan, the sergeant-at-arms of the Angels' West Toronto chapter, who had gone out drinking that night to celebrate his 33rd birthday, and in his drunken state he began to threaten Lenti. In the outlaw biker subculture, the office of sergeant-at-arms is generally held by the toughest member in a chapter, and Buchanan had been appointed to that position on the account of his brutality, strength and cruelty. Buchanan, a white Jamaican immigrant, had been a member of a street gang, the Mount Olive Crips, that were the Toronto branch of the American Crips gang, before joining the Angels. Buchanan was known to the police as one of Toronto's principal gunrunners who sold guns, that the Angels had smuggled in from the United States, to various street gangs of Toronto. Alongside Buchanan were fellow Angels Dana "Boomer" Carnegie, Scott Desroche and Carlo Verrilli.

The Angels confronted Lenti and threatened him, causing him to go to the lobby where the lighting was better and a security camera captured everything that ensured. The video footage showed that Lenti was seeking to calm down the angry Angels while Buchanan was set on escalating the situation. Lenti firmly asked several times for the Angels to "Please go home" while Buchanan shouted "You shut up, motherfucker, old guy!". Buchanan began to strike Lenti with the other three Angels surrounding Lenti, making an escape impossible. A very belligerent, drunken Buchanan told Lenti "Who's looking at who, motherfucker!"

Lenti, believing the Angels had come to kill him, was recorded by the security cameras as having his "right arm slipped behind his back, in a smooth, almost imperceptible movement" to pull out his handgun. Lenti opened fire, wounding one Angel, Verrelli, and killing Buchanan, while the other two Angels ran away with Desroche found fearfully hiding in the janitor's closet. Cargnie was also wounded, but was able to drive to the Humber River Regional Hospital to have his gunshot wound treated. Lenti stated he believed that Buchanan had a gun, but none was found on his corpse. Lenti turned himself in to the police the next day, and told Detective Angelo DeLorenzi that he had gone to the lobby of Club Pro Adult Entertainment to have the confrontation recorded by the security cameras, saying he was not looking for trouble. Afterwards, several Hells Angels contacted Lenti's family, saying that Buchanan had been out of line, and that they felt his killing was justified as Lenti had only shot him after being punched. David Atwell, a police informer within the Hells Angels, reported that the Angels national secretary Donny Petersen's reaction as: "Petersen says up until this happened he had a good relationship with Frank and that Frank saved his life once".

In the fall of 2007, a statement by "Cisco 13 1%er Canada" appeared on the Bandido website stating: "As of October 2, 2007, the Bandidos MC 1% Canada is officially shut down. There isn't no more Bandidos MC membership in Canada". Lenti's statement went on to ask that all Canadian Bandidos mail their jackets with the Bandido patch at once to an address in Texas.

== Later life and death ==
In 2007, Lenti's son Jessi attempted to join the Canadian Army and was turned down because of his father. At the time, the senior Lenti told the media "I'm the criminal, so why punish him?". The historian Jack Granatstein criticised the Army for turning down Jessi Lenti, saying "I've never heard of this kind of thing before." Ray Lefaive, the vice principal at the St. Joan of Arc Catholic school where Jessi Lenti was educated described Frank Lenti as a strict father who gave him permission to strike his son if he should misbehave. Lefaive added that he had the impression that Lenti pere did not want Lenti fils to follow him into the outlaw biker subculture, saying "I really always felt that he [Jessi Lenti] was sheltered from it". The senior Lenti, who was in jail at the time awaiting murder charges for killing Buchanan, stated: ""I had a lot of fun but in the end you end up in a place like this. I always told him that I didn't want him involved in my business". Jessi Lenti concurred with his father's assessment as he stated that if he joined an outlaw biker club, his father's reaction would be: "He'd hunt me down. He'd probably rip the (club's) patch off and smack me across the head with it". Jessi Lenti has no criminal record and Armand La Barge, the police chief of York Region, told Peter Edwards, the crime correspondent for the Toronto Star: ""To the best of our knowledge, he (Jessi Lenti) has never been a member of an outlaw motorcycle gang and to the best of our knowledge, he has never been a member of an organized crime group or entity either". The younger Lenti stated that it had been his dream since his boyhood to be a soldier and what the Army was saying in rejecting his application was: "What they're trying to tell me is, `We don't want you to do good. Go do bad'. I'm trying to go in a straight line."

On April 14, 2008, Lenti pled guilty to manslaughter for killing Buchanan and was sentenced to 6 years in prison with Justice Michael Brown ruling that since Buchanan had punched Lenti several times before Lenti shot him that he did have a legitimate fear for his life. The fact that Lenti continued to shoot Buchanan even after he was lying on the ground could have been used by the Crown to argue that he was guilty of murder since by that point Buchanan did not pose any danger to him, causing Lenti not to take his chances with the jury. At the same time, the video footage of the confrontation at Club Pro Adult Entertainment showed that Buchanan was the aggressor, which gave Lenti's lawyers a strong case for self-defense on the part of their client, causing the Crown to drop the murder charges and to settle for a plea bargain. On November 7, 2008, the Crown's case against Akleh and Stephenson collapsed when Akleh revealed to the court he had been a police informer since 2002 and there never was a murder plot against Lenti. Edwards has charged that the professional con-man Gault had manufactured the alleged murder plot so he could collect a $1 million payment from the Crown. On January 18, 2009, Akleh and Stephenson were acquitted of conspiring to murder Lenti with the jury ruling that Crown's case rested entirely on the unreliable word of Gault. Edwards wrote that as a result of Gault's lies, Lenti had killed Buchanan, thinking he was out to kill him when in reality Buchanan was seeking to intimidate him, writing: "Gault had set out to destroy his former Hells Angels brothers, but instead brought down the last of the Bandidos".

After his release from prison in 2014, Lenti was the object of an assassination attempt at his Vaughan home on December 20, 2016 when a shot was fired at him from a would-be-killer on his driveway. The assassin's gun jammed after the first shot while Lenti made a motion as if he was reaching to pull out a gun, causing the gunman to run away. Lenti professed not to be worried, saying in 2019: "The day I worry about bad guys is the day I fucking kill myself". Lenti stated he planned to retire from outlaw biking soon, but still wore in public a jacket with the word "Criminal" written on the back.

Lenti died on October 31, 2026, at the age of 79, after living for some time in a long-term care home. He was interred at Holy Cross Catholic Cemetery, Thornhill.

== Books ==
- Edwards, Peter (2010), The Bandido Massacre; A True Story of Bikers, Brotherhood and Betrayal, HarperCollins Publishers Ltd, ISBN 978-0307372765
- Edwards, Peter (2013). Unrepentant The Strange and (Sometimes) Terrible Life of Lorne Campbell, Satan's Choice and Hells Angels Biker. Toronto: Vintage Canada. ISBN 9780307362575.
- Edwards, Peter (2017), Hard Road: Bernie Guindon and the Reign of the Satan's Choice Motorcycle Club, HarperCollins, ISBN 978-1443427258
- Kirby, Cecil (1986). Mafia Enforcer The Inside Story of a Canadian Biker, Hitman, and Police Informer. Toronto: Methuen. ISBN 9780458804405.
- Lavinge, Yves (1999). Hells Angels at War. Toronto: HarperCollins. ISBN 0002000245.
- Langton, Jerry (2006), Fallen Angel: The Unlikely Rise of Walter Stadnick and the Canadian Hells Angels, [HarperCollins Publishers, ISBN 144342725X
- Langton, Jerry (2010), Showdown: How the Outlaws, Hells Angels and Cops Fought for Control of the Streets, John Wiley & Sons, ISBN 978-0470678787
