= Jamie Flanz =

Canadian outlaw biker (1969–2006)

- Born: 1969; Montreal, Quebec, Canada
- Died: 7 April 2006 (aged 36–37); Elgin County, Ontario, Canada
- Other name: "Goldberg"
- Occupations: Outlaw biker; computer consultant; bouncer
- Known for: Victim of the Shedden massacre
- Allegiance: Bandidos MC

Jamie Flanz (1969 – 7 April 2006), better known as "Goldberg", was a Canadian outlaw biker and gangster who was one of the victims of the Shedden massacre.

== Bandidos ==
Flanz was born in Montreal into an upper-class English-speaking Jewish family, the son of Leonard Flanz and Ellie Levine. Leonard Flanz was a successful lawyer specializing in corporate and bankruptcy law. In 1997, Flanz moved to Keswick, Ontario. Flanz's reasons for moving to Ontario was his belief that as a Jewish Anglo (English-speaker), he had more of a future in Ontario than in Quebec, which was governed at the time by separatist Parti Québécois, which insisted that Quebec was the special homeland of the pure-laine ("pure wool") French-Canadians. Flanz was married to Allison Harnett, by whom he had two children, but the marriage ended in divorce. The journalist Jerry Langton described Flanz as a "strapping former hockey player" and "a well-liked and intelligent young man". Flanz ran a successful computer consulting business in Keswick. Flanz also worked part-time as a bouncer in a bar in Keswick, through his reasons for doing were not financial, but because he enjoyed being able to socialize with the bar's patrons.

After his divorce, Flanz became lonely and became convinced that if he became a "badass" outlaw biker, he would be attractive to women. Flanz spent his free time cruising internet chat rooms under the name BigDaddyRogue looking for female company where he wrote with his terrible spelling: "If you are stong [strong] to love you have more strenght [strength] then most. I have that strength, the will and the confidence to give what I expect in return. IM [I'm] a diehard romantic who beleives [believes] in giving all of HImself [himself] when he finds that someone special".

In early 2005, Flanz joined the Bandidos, being sponsored by his friend Paul "Big Paulie" Sinopoli. Sinopoli was obese, had no job, and still lived with his parents at the age of 30, but he was considered very attractive by many women because he wore the Bandidos patch. Glenn "Wrong Way" Atkinson, the former Bandidos national secretary, in an interview stated: "How many guys that weigh four hundred pounds get laid that often?". Seeing the way that the Bandidos patch had made Sinopoli into a sex symbol convinced Flanz that wearing the Bandidos patch would likewise make him attractive towards women. As a "hand-around", Flanz served as a servant towards Sinopoli, having to chauffeur him around, pay for his meals, and do any chore that Sinopoli wanted him to do.

Flanz served as a sort of bank for his fellow Bandidos, as the well-off Flanz was always lending money to his fellow Bandidos. His membership in the Bandidos ended him costing Flanz money. Peter Edwards, the crime correspondent of The Toronto Star, described Flanz as a pseudo-gangster who was "only playing tough", writing that he was a man who was seeking love in a very misguided way, unlike some of the other members of the Toronto chapter like Luis "Chopper" Raposo who were hardened career criminals. Flanz's nickname of "Goldberg" was after the professional wrestler Bill Goldberg and as a way of reminding him that he was the only Jewish outlaw biker in Canada. Flanz shaved his head bald and grew up a goatee beard to make himself look an outlaw biker. Keswick was a stronghold of the Hells Angels. Despite being a member of the Bandidos, the Angels ignored him as he was considered to be unimportant and not a threat to the Angels.

=== The Douse murder ===
In late 2005, Flanz was promoted up to being a "prospect" (the second level in a biker gang). Flanz wanted to be promoted up the Bandido ranks and was willing to engage in any action that allow him to be promoted. On 6 December 2005, Flanz's townhouse at Hattie Court in Keswick was the scene of a murder. A group of Bandidos consisting of Cameron Acorn, Pierre Aragon, Randy Brown, Paul Sinopoli, and Robert Quinn had Quinn's girlfriend, a woman known only by the pseudonym "Mary Thompson" due to a court order, call a local drug dealer, Shawn Douse, and asked him to come to Flanz's townhouse, saying she wanted to buy cocaine. When Douse arrived at Flanz's townhouse on the evening of 6 December 2005, he was the subject of racist abuse as he was a black man whom Acorn was angry with because of his relationship with a white woman, whom he was also selling cocaine to. Douse was dragged down to Flanz's basement and was beaten to death by Acorn, Brown, Aragon, Quinn and Sinopoli.

Flanz was not present at the time of the murder, but did not report the crime when he returned home and helped destroy evidence by washing away the blood in his basement. Flanz was angry that the bikers had murdered a man in his townhouse, all the more so because Douse had arrived at his townhouse via a taxi, but chose not to report the crime out of his desire to be promoted up the ranks. The charred corpse of Douse was found on 8 December 2005 in Pickering as his killers had set his body afire after dumping the corpse in Pickering. The police viewed Flanz as a prime suspect as Douse had last been seen alive entering his townhouse on the evening of 6 December and placed him under surveillance.

The Bandidos national sergeant-at-arms, Wayne "Weiner" Kellestine, is an ardent Nazi and hated Flanz for being Jewish. Kellestine's farmhouse at 32196 Aberdeen Line was decorated with Nazi memorabilia and he liked to paint the walls either red, white or black (the three colors of the National Socialist German Workers' Party whose flag was a black swastika in a white circle surrounded by red). Langton wrote that Kellestine "...was obsessed with two things – guns and the Nazi Party". Kellestine accused Flanz several times of being a police informer. Kellestine argued that because Acorn had been arrested for the Douse killing while Flanz was still free that he must be an informer. It was decided that the entire Bandido Toronto chapter would go to Kellestine's farmhouse on 7 April 2006 to discuss Kellestine's allegations against Flanz in a "church" meeting (i.e. a mandatory meeting).

=== The Shedden massacre ===
On the night of 7 April 2006, Flanz drove Sinopoli to the "church" meeting at the farmhouse of Wayne Kellestine. Because of the Douse murder, a surveillance team from the York Regional Police followed Flanz's car down the 401 highway as he drove from Keswick to Iona Station. The police observed the "no-surrender crew" parking their cars outside of Kellestine's barn. However, the police believed that the Toronto chapter were attending a party in Kellestine's barn and decided as Langton put: "...there was no use in sitting on some lonely country road watching a bunch of idiots get drunk". The police team left the Aberdeen line about 12:30 am. Because Flanz was last seen alive by the police taking his automobile into Kellestine's farm at 32196 Aberdeen Line, Kellestine was the prime suspect in the massacre. As the men left their cars, the Bandidos national president Giovanni "Boxer" Muscedere took Flanz aside and warned him: "You're going to have some kind of a bad reception over there, so you you might to stay outside".

When entering Kellestine's barn for the meeting, Luis Raposo, the Bandidos national treasurer, was shot down by Michael "Taz" Sandham. Kellestine fired his handgun in the air and announced that was now in charge. Kellestine took a particular dislike to Flanz because he was Jewish, saying "I'm saving you for last you fucking Jew!" Kellestine pistol-whipped Flanz and rammed his gun into his face several times, saying he was going to kill him and then saying "just kidding", which he seemed to find very amusing as he enjoyed seeing the fear and discomfort on Flanz's face. Kellestine had Flanz and another Bandido, Michael "Little Mikey" Trotta, wrap Raposo's corpse in an old rug that lying about in the barn and place it in the trunk of Raposo's car. At about 12:30 am, the police surveillance team that had followed Flanz to Kellestine's farmhouse left, believing there was nothing to observe.

As the members of the "no-surrender crew" were marched out from Kellestine's barn and shot, Flanz smoked his last cigarettes and talked constantly about his two children, Amanda and Hunter, asking the killers to spare him so he would see his children again. Flanz kept saying he now realized that his children were what really mattered to him. Kellestine had Flanz and Trotta mop the floor of the barn with bleach while Sinopoli was marched out by Kellestine and Dwight "Big Dee" Mushey to be shot. Flanz was the last one to be shot. Flanz was ordered to sit in the automobile of Trotta while Sandham fired a shot at point-blank range at his face. Sandham shot off much of Flanz's right cheek, but was still alive. As Flanz looked up with a sad expression as begged with his eyes to spare his life, Sandham claimed his gun was jammed. Another of the killers, Mushey, took the gun from Sandham and proved it was not jammed by shooting Flanz between the eyes, killing him instantly.

== Funeral ==
As Jewish tradition calls for the dead to be buried as soon as possible, Flanz was the first victim to be buried. Flanz was buried in Montreal on 12 April 2006 and his funeral was attended by Senator Yoine Goldstein, a partner of Flanz's father in the law firm Goldstein, Flanz & Fishman. Many who had known him in Montreal were shocked to discover that he became involved in organized crime, saying that he had no such tendencies when he lived in Montreal. Rabbi Chaim Steinmetz read out a eulogy at the funeral written by Flanz's sister, Jennifer, that argued through Flanz had made an ill-informed decision in joining the Bandidos that he was a good man.

In January 2008, the killers of Douse were brought to trial. At the trial, Flanz was named as one of those involved in the murder which ended the accused making plea bargains. On 8 January 2008, Acorn and Quinn pleaded guilty to manslaughter, Aragon to aggravated assault and Brown to second-degree murder. Had Flanz not been killed, he along with Sinopoli would have been convicted for their roles in Douse's killing.

== The Fat Mexican conspiracy theory ==
In 2009, the author Alex Caine in his book The Fat Mexican accused Flanz together with George "Pony" Jessome of having caused his own murder together with the others killed in the Shedden massacre. Caine accused Flanz of stealing a bag full of cocaine worth hundreds of thousands of dollars from the Hells Angels, who supposedly forced Kellestine to murder the others in revenge. Caine's conspiracy theory about Flanz as the author of his own murder has widely dismissed as the journalist Bruce Owen noted that Caine made "unsupported theories" in The Fat Mexican as his book was lacking in evidence.

== Books ==
- Edwards, Peter (2010), The Bandido Massacre; A True Story of Bikers, Brotherhood and Betrayal, HarperCollins Publishers Ltd, ISBN 978-0307372765
- Langton, Jerry (2010), Showdown: How the Outlaws, Hells Angels and Cops Fought for Control of the Streets, John Wiley & Sons, ISBN 978-0470678787
