= Paul Sinopoli =

Canadian outlaw biker

- Born: 1975; Argentina
- Died: April 7, 2006 (aged 30–31); Shedden, Ontario, Canada

Paul Sinopoli (1975 – April 7, 2006) was a Canadian outlaw biker and gangster. He was one of the eight victims of the Shedden massacre.

== Gangster ==
Sinopoli was born in Argentina into a middle-class Italo-Argentine family, but his family moved to Canada when he was a child. Sinopoli's parents, Onofuco and Antonetta, owned a posh house in the upper middle-class town of Jackson's Point, Ontario, on the shores of Lake Simcoe. A gluttonous man, Sinopoli was extremely obese as he weighed about 400 pounds. Sinopoli suffered from low self-esteem as he felt ashamed about his morbid obesity. Sinppoli had once worked briefly as a security guard for a sporting gods store in the early 2000s, but preferred to work as a petty drug dealer due to his extreme laziness. Sinopoli had planned to become a forklift driver, an ambition he had quickly abandoned. Sinopoli was not a successful drug dealer and was still living at home with his parents at the age of 30 as he could not afford to pay rent. Sinopoli came to believe that joining the Bandidos outlaw biker club would make him into a someone important. Sinopli very much wanted to be liked and to be popular. He disliked riding motorcycles and owned a used Harley-Davidson that was in such poor condition as to be un-ridable.

In November 2001, Sinopoli together with Cameron Acorn joined the Killerbeez puppet gang. In late 2002, Sinopoli became a "hang-around" (the first level of a biker gang) of the Bandidos. In the spring of 2003, Sinopoli became a "prospect" (the second level of a biker club) with the Bandidos. However, Sinopoli was still so poor as to be unable to afford to attend a funeral for a murdered Bandido, Joey "Crazy Horse" Morin, who was killed in Edmonton on 30 January 2004. In the summer of 2004, Sinopoli tried to be promoted up to a "full patch" member, but was vetoed by the national treasurer, Luis "Chopper" Raposo who felt that Sinopoli was unfit for the promotion owing to his laziness and inability to contribute financially.

At the age of 30, Sinopoli still lived in his parents' basement, spending his days gorging on food while watching television for hours on end. Sinopoli was also unable to afford his share of the joint cellphone plan with Telus as he was in $191.23 in arrears. Even though Sinopoli was obese, had no job, and still lived with his parents at the age of 30, he was considered attractive by many women because he wore the Bandido patch. Glenn "Wrong Way" Atkinson, the former Bandidos national secretary, in an interview stated: "How many guys that weigh four hundred pounds get laid that often?". By 2005, Sinopoli had finally become a "full patch" Bandido and the treasurer of the Toronto chapter, which placed below Raposo, the national treasurer. Sinopoli liked to socialize with the Bandidos as it made him feel powerful. For the first three months in 2005, he spent much time at their clubhouse, where he likewise spent much time relaxing on a couch while watching television.

== The Douse murder ==
On 6 December 2005, Sinopoli took part in the murder of a local drug dealer in Keswick, Shawn Douse, who was beaten to death because he was a black man said to be in a relationship with a white woman and was selling her cocaine. Douse arrived at the townhouse of Jamie Flanz by taxi. Cameron Acorn and his fellow Bandidos Sinopoli Pierre Aragon, Rudolph Brown and Robert Quinn fell on Douse, stuffed a gag into his mouth and beat him to death. Douse screamed repeatedly as he was beaten to death in Flanz's basement, saying "I'm sorry", but no mercy was granted as he considered to be just a "nigger" by the Bandidos. As a result of Douse's murder, the police tapped Sinopli's phone. Despite his "teddy bear" image, at the trial of Douse's killers in 2008, Sinopoli was identified as one of the Bandidos who had beaten Douse to death at Flanz's apartment. Sinopoli wanted to quit the Bandidos to focus on losing weight, but did not out of loyalty to his "brothers".

== The Shedden massacre ==
In early April 2006, Wayne Kellestine, the sergeant-at-arms of the Bandidos accused Jamie Flanz of being a police informer and demanded a "church" (mandatory meeting) at his farmhouse outside of Iona Station to discuss his allegations. Sinopli tried not to attend the meeting, stating he was suffering from a bleeding ulcer. Sinopoli in the week preceding the meeting was overheard by the OPP listening in on his phone conversations repeatedly trying to find an excuse not to visit Kellestine's farm, saying he was feeling unwell. At 3:33 pm, Muscedere phoned Sinopoli to ask him to attend the meeting, but Sinopoli replied: "Yeah, my ulcer's bleeding a lot. There some lining in my stomach's thinning gout, so I just gotta take this medication. Hopefully, it starts working. That's about it bro". Muscedere insisted that Sinopoli attend the meeting, saying he needed his help to resolve some issues with Sandham and Kellestine.

In a phone call at 5 pm, the Toronto chapter president Frank Salerno told Sinopoli that if he failed to attend the meeting and bring some $550 he owed in arrears to the club he would be expelled. Salerno stated: "Bro, uh, Boxer's freaking out, bro. You're on your last legs, you're almost out of the door. So if I was you, I'd get yourself to church today". Sinopoli sadly told Salerno: "Yeah, I have some money Yeah, I'm bringing it down". Salerno told Sinopoli to bring money to the meeting, saying: "You better bring it. Don't come there empty-handed, brother, and don't bother phonin' him and telling him you're sick". When Sinopoli stated he was very unwell, Salerno told him: "I'm telling you what to do. If you don't want to listen to me, that's your problem. Don't come crying to me after". Sinopoli finally reluctantly agreed to attend the meeting.

Kellestine in a phone call at about 6 pm told Sinopoli: "Uh, I haven't heard from you for a while. What's up, buds? You don't love me no more?" Howdy doody, whaddaya doin', Big Paulie?" Sinopoli replied: "I could be better". Kellestine asked pressed Sinopoli about why has not attending the meeting, Sinopoli stated: "I've just been sick, bro". Kellestine seemed interested in learning from Sinopoli what the Bandidos national treasurer Luis "Chopper" Raposo might do at the meeting as he suspected that Raposo might bring a gun to the meeting as he indeed he did. Kellestine then started to sing the 1960 Elvis Presley song "It's Now or Never", which he incorrectly credited to Roy Orbison, saying Sinopoli had to attend the meeting to prove that he loved his biker brothers, forcing Sinopoli to promise to come.

Upon entering Kellestine's barn, Raposo was killed by Michael Sandham. Sinopoli attempted to flee from the barn upon seeing Raposo being killed, but was shot by Kellestine in the thigh. As Sinopoli was lying on the ground bleeding, he cried for hours on end, saying he never wanted to attend this meeting. Salerno told him: "We're bikers. We're not the fucking Boy Scouts, so stop your whining". Sinopoli was extremely terrified for his life and lost control of his bladder several times. Sandham forced Sinopoli at gunpoint to confess that he had been stealing the monthly dues he had been mailing from Winnipeg. Sinopoli was taken out to be shot, crying and screaming hysterically, saying that he had really wished that he not attended this meeting as he had wanted to. Sinopoli was shot by Kellestine, but survived while Kellestine's gun jammed. Kellestine complained about his "piece of shit gun" and another of the killers, Marcello "Fat Ass" Aravena, had to go fetch him another gun. Sinopoli begged Kellestine to spare him, but Kellestine told him: "Shut up and die like a man!" Sinopoli continued to cry out his eyes and scream that he did not want to die. When Aravena handed Kellestine another handgun, Sinpoli was finally finished off by a shot to the head.

== The discovery ==
The killers planned to dump the corpses outside of Kitchener, believing that the Hells Angels would be blamed for the massacre. Sinopoli's obese body did not fit into the truck of Flanz's car, and almost fell out several times as the killers drove away from Kellestine's farm. However, the killers did not have enough gas in their vehicles, and instead abandoned the vehicles in a farmer's field outside of Shedden, Ontario. Early on the morning of 8 April 2006, the couple that owned the field, Russell and Mary Steele, were surprised to find a number of vehicles left abandoned one of their fields. Upon discovering the corpses, the Steeles called the police. A policeman found Sinopoli's corpse inside the trunk of Flanz's Infiniti car.

The television footage of Sinopoli's corpse lying in the trunk of Flanz's car with his bulging white belly made national television that day and was on the frontpage of every Canadian newspaper the next day. Sinopoli's corpse was badly shot up with several bullet wounds. Besides for the bullet wounds, Sinopoli's pants were visibly soiled with his own excrement and urine, suggesting that his fear for his own life had been very intense in his last moments alive. His family first discovered that he had been murdered when they saw his corpse on national television lying on the trunk of Flanz's car.

Sinopoli was buried at St. Charles Borromeo Catholic Church in Toronto. Father Fred Mazzarella told the mourners: "Many questions we would like answered and I don't have them. We are not here to judge, we are here to pray. None of us are perfect". For a man who thought he was unloved in life, Sinopoli's funeral was well attended with about 150 people showing up to pay their respects.

In January 2008, the killers of Douse were brought to trial. At the trial, Sinopoli was named as one of those involved in the murder which ended the accused making plea bargains. On 8 January 2008, Acorn and Quinn pleaded guilty to manslaughter, Aragon to aggravated assault and Brown to second-degree murder. Had Sinopoli not been killed, he along with Flanz would have been convicted for their roles in Douse's killing.

During the trial of the Shedden massacre killers in 2009, Jane Sims, the crime correspondent of The London Free Press, stated the Bandidos Motorcycle Club sounded very much like the mindlessly macho He-Men Women Haters Club from the Our Gang short films of the 1930s. Peter Edwards, the crime correspondent of The Toronto Star, agreed with her, writing the Bandidos had "grandiose rituals and overblown mythology" that were "more the stuff of fantasy and macho escapism than reality" that strongly appealed to weak, insecure men. Edwards wrote that most of the victims of the massacre such as Sinopoli were the type of weak men who were attracted to the Bandidos less because they were criminals and more out of a desire to appear important and powerful. Edwards stated in a 2010 interview:

What struck me as bizarre was that most of the people who were murdered actually wanted out of the club, like these were murders for nothing. They couldn't bring themselves to quit, too afraid to quit. Such a bizarre contradiction, between what some may think is a power struggle when in fact (the victims) wanted out...There were differences individually. But they were all drawn to a symbol, and a pretty absurd symbol – (the Bandido was) a cartoon character stolen from a potato chip company. Like, you have a murder over that symbol? It's just bizarre. Nothing more to it, no money changed hands in the murders, nobody made a penny. To have that level of violence fought for absolutely nothing, except being in the pecking order of people who wear a cartoon character on their back. Just bizarre...Some of (the victims) were pretty nice guys, and my feeling is that if they hadn't gone to the farm that night, within five years they would have just wandered out of it again. I think most of the victims weren't real bikers, and would have gone on to regular lives.

== Books ==
- Baker, Thomas (2014), Biker Gangs and Transnational Organized Crime, Routledge, ISBN 978-1-317-52411-3
- Edwards, Peter (2010), The Bandido Massacre; A True Story of Bikers, Brotherhood and Betrayal, HarperCollins Publishers Ltd, ISBN 978-0-307-37276-5
- Langton, Jerry (2010), Showdown: How the Outlaws, Hells Angels and Cops Fought for Control of the Streets, John Wiley & Sons, ISBN 978-0-470-67878-7
