= Iona Station =

Hamlet in Ontario, Canada

Coordinates: 42.708678°N 81.409925°W

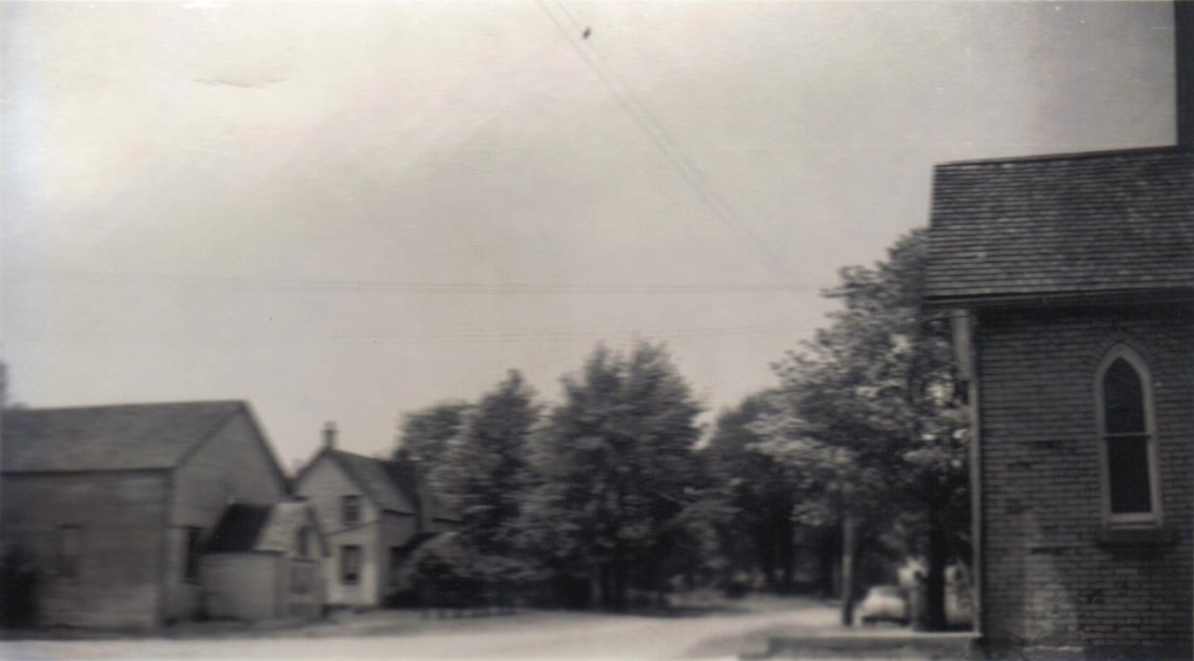

Iona Station is a hamlet located on the border of Dutton-Dunwich and Southwold townships, in Elgin County, Ontario, Canada. The "station" in the name was on the Canada Southern Railroad owned by the Michigan Central Railroad, later by the New York Central Railroad.

The Canadian economist John Kenneth Galbraith (1908–2006) was born in Iona Station.

The Iona Station General store (which is closed now) was operated by D.J. McBride and was taken over by his son, Arthur. At the same time a blacksmith shop on the east side of the townline was operated by Harold "Boots" Dundas.

During the early years, the children of the community went to S.S.#6 Dunwich – a one-room school house, located on the southwest corner of Shakleton Road and Iona Line. The school house has since been demolished and replaced by a private residence.

The farmhouse and barn of Wayne Kellestine, convicted in the 2006 Shedden Massacre, is located nearby.

== See also ==
- List of communities in Ontario
