= Luis Raposo =

Canadian outlaw biker and gangster

Luis Manny Raposo (1964 – 7 April 2006), better known as "Chopper", was a Canadian outlaw biker and gangster. He was one of the victims of the Shedden massacre of 2006.

== Loner ==
Raposo was born in Toronto, the son of Portuguese immigrants. Raposo was considered to be a "ladies men", but the people he loved the most were his parents, whom he was still living with at the age of 41. In the late 1990s, he joined the Loners motorcycle gang. As a hang-around and then as a prospect with the Loners in the 1990s, Raposo had been repeatedly called out by his mentor James "Ripper" Fullager for not having matches and toothpicks on him at all times for the benefit of the full patch members, a test he now applied to the others when he reached "full patch" status, who usually failed it.

Peter Edwards, the crime correspondent of The Toronto Star, described Raposo as a dangerous drug addict whose eyes had a "glassy, crazed quality". Edwards wrote some of the members of the Bandidos Toronto chapter such as Paul Sinopoli and Jamie Flanz were more pseudo-gangsters who had joined the Bandidos out of a misguided belief that this would make them attractive towards women, but that Raposo was a hardened career criminal who was comfortable with violence in a way that Sinopoli and Flanz were not. Raposo was the cousin to the gangster Johanny Raposo, who murdered in Toronto in 2012.

== Bandido ==
On 22 May 2001, Raposo joined the Bandidos motorcycle gang. Raposo became the national treasurer of the Bandidos. One biker from Edmonton who considered joining the Bandidos, Joe "Crazy Horse" Morin, was not impressed with Raposo, who was "stoned" at a party hosted by Wayne Kellestine in October 2001. In June 2002 as part of Operation Amigo Raposo was charged with trafficking in ecstasy and Viagra. On 18 July 2003, Raposo refused the Crown's offer of a plea bargain, saying in a Montreal courtroom: "I'm not guilty and I'm not going to plead guilty. It's not a crime to go to parties and to go to funerals. Yes, I am a member of the Bandidos, but it's like priest of the Catholic church. There are some who are pedophiles and others who are not. It's like the police. There are some who are honest and some who are corrupt". The Crown's principle witness, Eric "Ratkiller" Nadeau, the former national secretary of the Bandidos had proved to be a poor witness in the courtroom and the judge dismissed the charges against Raposo before the trial was due to be start, saying the Crown did not have a case with a witness like Nadeau. In 2004, Raposo together with Frank Lenti created the website for the Canadian Bandidos. On 30 January 2004, a member of the Edmonton Bandidos chapter, Joey "Crazy Horse" Morin was murdered by the Hells Angels. Raposo attended the funeral in Edmonton despite being his financial problems and much to his disgust, no-one from the new Winnipeg chapter led by Michael Sandham attended the funeral, even through Winnipeg was far closer to Edmonton than was Toronto.

In October 2004, when the Bandidos national secretary, Glenn "Wrongway" Atkinson resigned, Raposo was present. As Atkinson was beaten bloody by Giovanni Muscedere and Wayne Kellestine for his resignation, Raposo looked the other way and pretended not to see the beating. On 24 November 2004, William Sartelle, the world secretary of the Bandidos emailed Raposo, writing: "You can't come here, we can't come there, but you do want to answer any questions. There are issues that need to be resolved. I have attempts to get these answers, but I have not". Raposo wrote: "All is good, but of course we have the odd [that could be] easily resolved". Raposo knew that the Canadian Banadidos had taken in new members without informing the American leadership, had not paid their monthly dues for some time, and had refused to answer any questions from the leadership in Houston, but in what appeared to be an act of insolence blithely assured Sartelle that the concerns in Houston would soon be resolved.

As treasurer, Raposo refused to grant "full patch" status to the Winnipeg chapter led by Michael Sandham under the grounds that Sandham was not paying his dues. In June 2005, Raposo vetoed Sandham's request for a "full charter" for the Winnipeg chapter, saying that the dues were not being paid. The amount of money in dispute was small with the probationary Winnipeg charter owning a thousand dollars plus $25 from every member, but the dispute proved to be impossible to resolve. Relations between Raposo and Sandham were stormy with both men accusing each other to their faces of embezzlement. At a meeting between Sandham and Raposo at Fullager's house on 9 September 2005, the Winnipeg Bandido known as M.H. remembered: "You could hear them yelling through the door". On 10 October 2010, Raposo received an email from Bandidos world secretary, William Sartelle, complaining that the Bandidos headquarters in Houston had not heard from the Toronto chapter for months, which was a violation of their rules. On 12 October 2005, Raposo replied, sending an email in his usual badly written English that read: "We are making arrangements to send a brother doun [down] to se [see] you. I have tried to call you but the 877 number I have it dos [does] not work from Canada. as [As] always the Canadian Brothers send are Love Loyalty and Respect Bandido Chopper 1%er". On 26 November 2005, Sandham again visited Toronto to ask for "full charter" status, which was again vetoed by Raposo, who accused Sandham of stealing. Sandham handed Raposo an envelope full of travel receipts worth $4,000 relating to his trip from Winnipeg to Toronto, which expected Raposo to pay. Raposo refused, which led to much shouting and ill will.

Raposo at the age of 41 still lived with his parents in the Kensington Market area of Toronto. His room was a virtual apartment with its own entrance, full bathroom, kitchen, big screen television and a glass chandelier. Raposo had no job and spent his days smoking marijuana in his room at his parents' house while watching television. However, Raposo worked as a debt collector for the Mafia, beating up people behind in their payments to loan sharks and drug dealers, and was considered to be a terrifying man who was very good with his fists.

Raposo who always seemed to be giving anyone who took a photograph of him the finger, felt the club standards were collapsing under Giovanni Muscedere's leadership, complaining it had taken him much time to become a full patch Loner in the 1990s and that Muscedere was letting in just anybody. Raposo was engaged to a nurse, Carrie Caldwall, and told her of his fears, saying he felt that the Bandidos were in a state of terminal decline as the club was losing money while being convulsed with in-fighting. In December 2005, Raposo called the sergeant-at-arms, Wayne Kellestine, to tell him tha the American leaders of the Bandidos were correct to be angry at the Canadian Bandidos as he stated: "What I am supposed to do? We're breaking the rules". Making the situation worse was that Sandham had done an end-run around Raposo by emailing the American leaders in Houston to complain that Raposo was blocking the Winnipeg chapter from receiving a "full charter". The American president of the Bandidos, Jeffery Pike, was enraged that Musedere had opened a chapter in Winnipeg the year before without telling him.

On 28 December 2005, the American leadership of the Bandidos, who had grown increasingly unhappy with Muscedere's leadership, expelled him and his followers, charging that they were failing to make money, not paying their monthly membership dues because they did not have the money, and were going about business in a "sloppy" manner, leaving them wide open to prosecution. One American Bandido, William "Bandido Bill" Sartelle, the national treasurer of Bandidos USA, in an email to Raposo complained: "You can't come here, we can't come there, but you do not want to answer any questions. There are issues that need to be resolved. I have made attempts to get these answers, but have not gotten fuck all". Sandham wrote an email to Houston, declaring his support for their decision against the Toronto chapter. Raposo for his part had written a series of rude emails to the American leaders in Houston, stating he was going continue to wear his Bandido patch even if he was expelled.

On 7 March 2006, Sandham, Kellestine and David Weiche travelled to British Columbia to visit the Peace Arch Park on the American-Canadian border. American bikers generally cannot enter Canada, as most of them have criminal records and vice versa. The Peace Arch Park, where it is possible to hold a conversation without crossing the border, is a popular meeting place for Canadian and American bikers. An American Bandido, Peter "Mongo" Price, told Sandham and Kellestine that Houston was furious that the "no surrender crew" were still wearing Bandido patches despite being expelled in December 2005. Price was the national sergeant-at-arms of Bandidos USA, making him in charge of discipline, and accompanying him were Keinard "Hawaiian Ken" Post and Brian Bentley of the Washington state Bandidos. The fact that Price had flown from Houston to meet Kellestine and Sandham in the Peace Arch Park suggested he had something especially important to say, that he could not say on the phone or write in an email. In his emails to his enemy Raposo after the meeting in the Peace Arch Park, Sandham adopted a mocking, condescending tone of superiority, as he was secure in the knowledge that Houston was on his side.

Kellestine refused to allow a friend of Raposo recently released from prison to retrieve his motorcycle, which he left on Kellestine's farm before going to prison, which Raposo took as a challenge. On 8 March 2006, Raposo wrote an email to Sandham, complaining that Sandham was not answering his cellphone as he wrote in capital letters: "MY TIME IS BETTER SPENT TAKING CARE OF OUR BROTHERS IN JAIL THEN TRYING TO GET A HOLD OF OUR BROTHER OUTSIDE". On 9 March 2006, Sandham wrote back: "Chopper, there is a reason why I am not contacting you right now. I am not available and I just talked with you last week. You have to stop calling the guys so many times a day and night. Some of the guys parents and families are getting very upset. Stop call the brothers homes and families". At a party held in Toronto to celebrate the 40th anniversary of the founding of the Bandidos in 1966 on 18 March 2006, Sandham was supposed to be present, but did not arrive nor did he call to say he would be absent. Kellestine likewise did not attend nor provide contact anyone about the reasons for his absence. After the party, Raposo was convinced that Sandham and Kellestine were engaged in some sort of plot against him. Raposo started to carry a gun at all times when out of his parents' house. Muscedre was very loyal to his supposed biker "brother" Kellestine and talked of shooting Frank Lenti for some insulting remarks he had made about Kellestine. Muscedere rejected Raposo's concerns, saying that Kellestine was his "brother" and always would be.

== The Shedden Massacre ==
Kellestine accused another Bandido, Jamie Flanz several times of being a police informer. It was decided that the entire Bandido Toronto chapter would go to Kellestine's farmhouse on 7 April 2006 to discuss Kellestine's allegations against Flanz in a "church" meeting (i.e. a mandatory meeting). Despite the rules forbidding bringing guns to "church" meetings, Raposo brought a sawed-off shotgun with him to the meeting as he knew that his enemy Sandham was going to be present. Raposo also brought along a print-out of the rude emails Sandham had been sending him since March, which planned to produce at the meeting, apparently with the aim of having Sandham expelled.

On the night of 7 April 2006, a meeting at Kellestine's farm attended by the two factions began at about 10:30 PM, when the "no surrender crew" entered his barn" The barn was full of rusting machinery, old furniture, and children's toys while its walls were decorated with pornographic photographs of buxom young women sitting atop Harley-Davidson motorcycles or half-dressed as construction workers together with "Kellestine's usual Nazi propaganda". Kellestine instructed his guests to stay in the middle where he had cleared out some space. Sandham was standing in the rafters with a rifle while others were patrolling outside armed with rifles and shotguns, and Gardiner listened to the police scanners inside Kellestine's house. As Raposo waited for the others to arrive outside the barn, he joked to Kellestine: "I have a fucking surprise for Taz [Sandham] when he shows up. I'm gonna put a fucking hole in him".

As Raposo entered the barn, Sandham shot and killed him. Edwards wrote: "What happened next has never been determined. Did Sandham get impatient for the glory that awaited him as leader of his own chapter. Was he simply afraid? Or did Raposo detech his assassin up in the rafters and scramble for his gun?" According to one version of the events, upon entering the barn, Raposo saw Sandham with his rifle, and realizing that he been betrayed fired at him with his sawed-off shotgun. Sandham was only slightly injured as he was wearing a bullet-proof vest, returned fire and killed Raposo. However, Raposo's favourite gesture was to "give the finger", and the autopsy revealed at the time of his death, Raposo had raised his middle finger while the rest of his fingers clinched into his fist and that Sandham's bullet had gone through Raposo's raised finger, shattering it completely. The forensic evidence does not support's Sandham's claim that Raposo had fired at him, and moreover Sandham is a "well known pathological liar" not known for his willingness to take responsibility for his actions. It is not entirely clear what happened other than Raposo was giving Sandham the finger at the time when Sandham used his skills as a marksman to put a bullet through it. The medical examination showed that Raposo had taken two bullets from two different guns. The autopsy showed that Raposo had done a significant amount of cocaine on the night of his murder.

One of the killers who later turned Crown's evidence, a man known only as M.H testified at the trial in 2009:

They were at the very bottom rung of biker gangs. Some were in their 40s but still lived with their parents. They were not making any money, many of them had been rejected by the Hells Angels and half of them didn't even own a motorbike.

== Books ==
- Baker, Thomas (2014), Biker Gangs and Transnational Organized Crime, Routledge, ISBN 978-1317524113
- Edwards, Peter (2010), The Bandido Massacre; A True Story of Bikers, Brotherhood and Betrayal, HarperCollins Publishers Ltd, ISBN 978-0307372765
- Langton, Jerry (2010), Showdown: How the Outlaws, Hells Angels and Cops Fought for Control of the Streets, John Wiley & Sons, ISBN 978-0470678787
