= Marcello Aravena =

Canadian mixed martial artist, outlaw biker and gangster

- Born: April 11, 1976; Chile
- Died: June 28, 2026 (aged 50); Bath, Ontario, Canada
- Occupations: Outlaw biker; gangster; mixed martial artist; security guard
- Known for: Participant in the Shedden massacre
- Allegiance: Bandidos MC
- Convictions: First-degree murder and manslaughter (2009)
- Penalty: Life imprisonment (2009)

Marcello Aravena (11 April 1976 – 28 June 2026) was a Canadian mixed martial arts (MMA) fighter, outlaw biker and gangster who was sentenced to life imprisonment following his conviction on seven counts of first-degree murder and one count of manslaughter for his role in the Shedden massacre of 2006.

== Early life and MMA career ==
Aravena was born in Chile, but grew up in Winnipeg. His IQ is extremely low as tests performed by police psychologists after his arrest in 2006 showed he had a vocabulary equivalent to that possessed by an eight-year-old boy. The journalist Anita Arvast called him a "bully by nature". The most notable aspect of Aravena is his ape-like face, which frequently led him as a both a boy and as an adult to have nicknames such as "the Great White Chilean Ape" and the "Mountain Gorilla".

After dropping out of high school, Aravena made his living as professional MMA fighter; as a security guard at a Winnipeg restaurant, Phat Daddy's; and as a professional boxer. Aravena usually lost his MMA and boxing matches. The journalist Jerry Langton noted that he "had a rather disheartening 7-31-1 record as a pro". Aravena said of his fighting career: "I put on a good show. That's why people liked me. I kept getting up and fighting". After Phat Daddy's restaurant was shut down, Arvena started to work for Dwight "Big Dee" Mushey. In the summer of 2005, Aravena's cousin, roommate and best friend was murdered in a bar fight, and afterwards, suffering from cocaine addiction, he moved in with his employer Mushey, paying $100 in rent in exchange for being allowed to live in his basement.

== Bandidos ==
Aravena was a tae kwon do enthusiast who worked as a bouncer in strip club owned by Mushey, the secretary of the Winnipeg Bandidos chapter. Despite not owning nor knowing to how to ride a motorcycle, Aravena was recruited into the Bandidos by Mushey. Aravena was considered by those who knew him to be a follower, not a leader. Aravena also worked as a boxer and a mixed martial arts (MMA) fighter, usually losing his matches held across the Prairies, but was felt to be useful as "muscle" for the Winnipeg Bandido chapter. A Chilean immigrant, Aravena billed himself in the ring as El Condor, but he was known on the MMA circuit on the Prairies as "The Great White Chilean Ape" and to his fellow Bandidos as "Beaker Two" as he was very loyal to the chapter president Michael "Taz" Sandham, aka "Little Beaker". Sandham spoke with a high pitched voice and was called "Little Beaker" by his men after the Beaker character on The Muppet Show.

=== Preparing for the massacre ===
On 25 March 2006, at a meeting in Mushey's house, it was announced by Sandham that he and Mushey plus three other Bandidos would be going to Ontario. The plan was to go to farmhouse of Wayne "Wiener" Kellestine at 32196 Aberdeen Line to "pull the patches" (i.e. take away their Bandido patches) of the "no-surrender crew" led by Giovanni "Boxer" Musedere. Aravena had an MMA fight in Steinbach scheduled, so it was agreed that he would not go with Sandham to Kellestine's farm, but fly out alone after the fight. After losing the fight in Steinbach, Aravena flew out to London, Ontario. The security cameras at the London airport showed Sandham and Mushey picking up Aravena.

Kellestine treated the junior Bandidos like Aravena and Brett "Bull" Gardiner like slaves, expecting them to do all of his housework for them. Sandham and the other Bandidos later described Kellestine as an odd and eccentric character who liked to eat animal excrement to prove how tough he was as an outlaw biker, and that he always laughed madly as the others looked on with disgust as he devoured whatever excrement he found lying on the ground. Aravena recalled that Kellestine would smile and say "mm-mm good" before eating excrement, which led him to the conclusion that Kellestine was a "little bit of a weirdo".

=== The Shedden Massacre ===
At the beginning of April 2006, Kellestine accused one of the "no surrender crew", Jamie "Goldberg" Flanz, of being a police informer. As Flanz was Jewish and the rabidly anti-Semitic Kellestine hated him for that, Muscedere did not take the allegation seriously, but to settle the matter, it was agreed that the "no surrender crew" would visit Kellestine's farm to discuss his claims. Most of the "no surrender crew" lived in the Toronto area, but Kellestine insisted that the meeting be held at his farm, and Muscedere agreed. Kellestine produced weapons from his gun cache together with what he called his "wet work kit" for cleaning up after murders Araveana later testified at the trial in 2009 that Kellestine told Sandham that it might possible to "salvage Crash (George Kriarakis), Pony (George Jessome) and Big Paulie (Paul Sinopoli)", but the rest of the "no surrender crew" would have to be killed. On the night of the massacre, Aravena was armed with a baseball bat as Sandham considered him too stupid to handle a gun.

On night of 7 April 2006, the "no-surrender crew" led by Muscedere arrived in Kellestine's barn. Sandham killed Luis "Chopper" Raposo as he entering the barn. After hearing the shots, Aravena rushed into the barn with his baseball bat. Kellestine told Aravena to get him beer and water for the rest. Kellestine also told Aravena to tell the men on the roof that everything was fine, which confused Aravena as there was no-one on the roof. Aravena stood guard over the prisoners, threatening them with his baseball bat if any tried to escape. Kellestine gave Aravena a handgun, but Sandham took it away from him, saying: "Give me that. You don't how to use it".

Kellestine, followed by Aravena, marched Muscedere out of the barn to execute him. Aravena watched as Kellestine executed Muscedere. Sandham told Aravena not to worry as he returned to the barn, saying Muscedere was the only one scheduled for execution and the rest of the "no surrender crew" were now going home, a lie that Aravena claimed at his trial to have believed in. Kellestine and Mushey took George "Crash" Kriarakis out to be executed. Aravena was ordered to place his body inside of his tow truck, through he professed to be believed that Krarakis was going to the hospital despite being dead. Paul Sinopoli was taken out to be shot, crying and screaming hysterically, saying that he had really wished that he not attended this meeting as he had wanted to. Sinopoli was shot by Kellestine, but survived while Kellestine's gun jammed. Kellestine complained about his "piece of shit gun" and Aravena had to go fetch him another gun. When Aravena handed Kellestine another handgun, Sinpoli was finally finished off by a shot to the head. As Francesco "Frank the Bammer" Salerno was taken out to be shot, he offered to shake Aravena's hand, an offer he refused. Aravena told Salerno: "I'm not shaking your hand!" Aravena was present when the last of the victims, Flanz, was executed. On the morning of 8 April 2006, Aravena left Kellestine's farm with Sandham and Mushey.

=== Arrest ===
Upon his return to Winnipeg, Aravena was promoted up to a "prospect" (the second level in an outlaw biker club). Aravena did not have an official Bandidos patch to wear, so his mother sewed up a pseudo-Bandido patch to go with his biker jacket. Mushey, telling another Bandido known only as M.H due to a court order who turned informer, stated: "Marcello's prancing around like a princess right now, with his new vest on". Aravena's mother also sewed up fake Bandidos patches to be worn by the rest of the chapter, whom Sandham had falsely claimed now to be "full patch" (the highest level in an outlaw biker club). On 16 June 2006, Aravena was arrested in Winnipeg on eight counts of first-degree murder along with Mushey and Sandham. Aravena did not resist his arrest and instead kissed his dog, Harley, before being handcuffed.

Aravena was charged with "constructive first-degree murder", meaning that through he had not killed anyone himself, the Crown alleged that he had aware of the plans to commit murder and that by assisting the killers by standing guard that he was just as much guilty of first-degree murder as those who did the actually did the killing. "Constructive first-degree murder" is a difficult charge to prove in court, and a number of lawyers felt that Aravena had a strong chance of acquittal. Many legal experts felt that the Crown Attorney prosecuting the case, Keven Gowdey, would have much difficulty in persuading the jury to convict Aravena of "constructive first-degree murder".

== Trial ==
The murder trial for Aravena, Gardiner, Kellestine, Mather, Mushey and Sandham commenced on March 31, 2009, in London, Ontario, with all six of the accused entering pleas of not guilty. The senior Crown Attorney (prosecutor) on the case was Kevin Gowdey assisted by junior Crown Attorneys Fraser Kelly, Tim Zuber, David D'Iorio and Meredith Gardiner. Kellestine was defended by Clay Powell, a Toronto lawyer best known for defending Keith Richards of the Rolling Stones after he was arrested for heroin possession in Toronto in 1977; Sandham was defended by Don Crawford, a lawyer used to defending "ambitious dimwits"; and Aravena was defended by Tony Bryant, well known in Ontario for his dogged defence of the serial killer Paul Bernardo at his 1995 trial.

Following the testimony of Sandham, widely viewed as a "train-wreck" that did himself much damage, Aravena took the stand on 22 September 2009. As Bryant had a reputation for being aggressive, it was junior defence counsel Kathryn Wells who questioned him on the stand. Aravena began with describing how in Chile, his father had abandoned his mother when he was a toddler, and how he came to Canada as a child looking for a better life. Aravena testified his IQ was very low as he failed grades 7, 8, and 9 before dropping out of school in grade 10, saying he just could not handle learning, and that his principal accomplishment in life was losing MMA fights. Aravena testified that on the night of the massacre, he wanted desperately to stop the killings, but was afraid that Kellestine, Sandham, M.H, and Mushey would kill him if he tried. Aravena stated he wanted to call the police but: "I knew there was no way out no. After what I just witnessed, I was glad I was friends with these guys… Because we got of there alive, I was really happy not to be dead".

The next day, Crown attorney Kelly began his cross-examination of Aravena. Kelly noted that Aravena, who stood 6'2, weighed 280 pounds and was very muscular, did not try to help Flanz despite the way that Kellestine kept pistol-whipping and insulting him for being Jewish. The boxer and MMA fighter Aravena replied "So I can get smacked around?" Aravena's remark caused those present in the courtroom to laugh at him. When Kelly produced a photograph taken in early April 2006 of a topless Kellestine – who was born in 1949 and had a scrawny build – leading him to ask: "How many of your opponents looked like that?" Aravena in response testified: "One was old, but he wasn't that old". Those present in the courtroom broke out laughing to Aravena. Like Sandham, Aravena used Kellestine's practice of eating animal excrement as an example of Kellestine's "crazy" behavior that was said to have terrified him so much, saying he was very much afraid of such a "crazy" man.

During his testimony, Aravena kept stating he was in fear of his life, leaving him with no choice, but to co-operate with Kellestine and Sandham while saying that he believed that the "no surrender crew" were going home. When Kelly pointed out the contradiction between Aravena's statement that he believed the "no surrender crew" were going home after their patches had been "pulled" vs. his statement that he was afraid for his life, Aravena looked very confused for some time, before answering that he had never thought about that before. Kelly asked: "It didn't cross your mind there was no way a tow truck with two bodies in it would be able to go to a hospital?" Aravena looked stunned and again stated that he never considered that until now. About Aravena's statement he was too afraid to stop the massacre, Kelly noted that Aravena was doing guard duty outside of Kellestine's barn and that: "In the dark, is not twenty yards like twenty miles?" Aravena replied "Yeah", which led Kelly to ask why Aravena did not flee into the darkness to seek help. Aravena answered that he didn't know, saying he was a very stupid man who had much trouble when it came to thinking. When Kelly asked "Everyone got promoted?", Aravena answered "yes", a statement that Kelly used to argue that promotion within the Bandido club was the reason for the massacre.

In his final submission to the jury, Bryant read out a touching letter full of pathos entitled "Dear Dad" and said to have been written by Aravena to the jury in his final address, portraying him as a sad lost soul caught up in events beyond his control. Powell demanded a mistrial under the grounds that the virtually illiterate Aravena could not have written the "Dear Dad" letter, but Justice Heeney ruled that through it was highly unlikely that Aravena had written the letter, this was not grounds for a mistrial.

On 29 October 2009, the jury returned 44 guilty verdicts for first degree murder and four for manslaughter, believed to be the largest number of murder convictions ever produced from a single criminal proceeding in Canada. Wayne Kellestine, Michael Sandham and Dwight Mushey were each found guilty of eight counts of first-degree murder. Aravena and Frank Mather were both found guilty of seven counts of first degree murder and one count of manslaughter. Brett Gardiner was found guilty of six counts of first degree murder and two counts of manslaughter. Aravena took the verdict very badly, gave the jury the finger and shouted at them: "Fucking goofs! You're pieces of fucking shit!". The journalist Jerry Langton wrote: "Although it may sound childish and comical, the word 'goof' is considered perhaps the worse insult among Ontario's likely-to-go-to-prison set. At least two murders in Kingston alone since the '80s were reported to be the result of someone calling someone else the G-word". When Bryant tried to calm down his client, saying this behavior would not help his appeal, Aravena shouted "Fuck you, Tony! Fuck you!" and tried to assault his lawyer. Aravena was marched out of the courtroom screaming in fury at the jury, judge, his lawyer and the Crown Attorneys. His behavior was later used by the Crown at his appeals to prove he was indeed a violent outlaw biker.

== Death ==
Aravena was serving a life sentence at Stony Mountain Penitentiary in Manitoba with no chance of parole. Aravena died on June 28, 2026 at the Bath Institution's Regional Treatment Center from suspected natural causes.
