= Shedden, Elgin County, Ontario =

Hamlet in Southwold Township, Elgin County, Ontario, Canada

Coordinates: 42°44′22″N 81°20′43″W

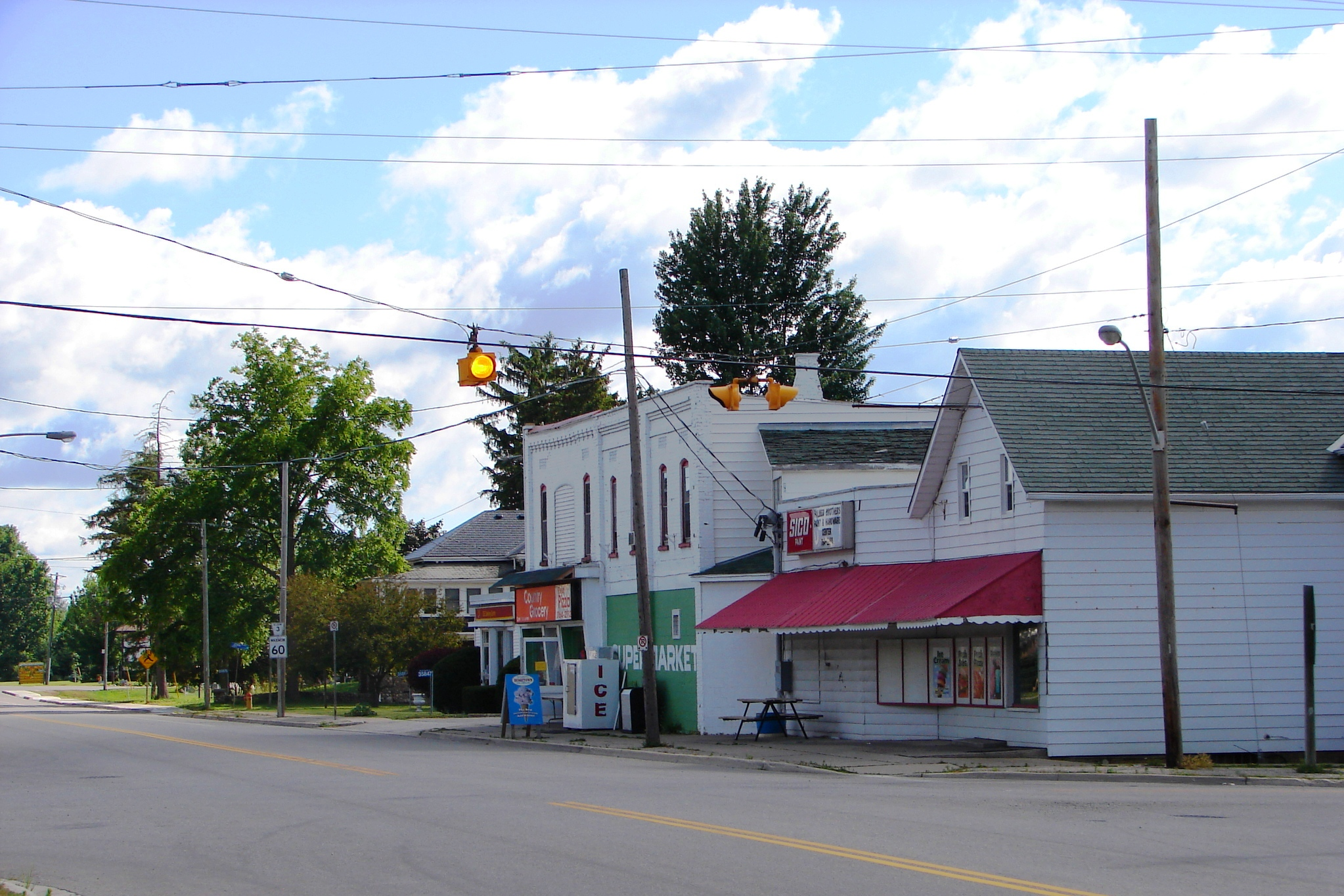
Shedden

Shedden, Ontario is a hamlet in Southwold Township, Elgin County in southwestern Ontario, Canada. It is known as "The Rhubarb Capital of Ontario" and is home to the "Rosy Rhubarb Festival" which is held in early June each summer with the big Shedden tractor pull that comes the week after. It was named in honour of John Shedden who was the foreman during the construction of Toronto's Union Station.

Shedden gained attention on April 8, 2006 when eight bodies were discovered in a farmer's field in relation to a gang-related mass murder.

== See also ==
- Coboconk, Ontario, a village in south-central Ontario that went by the name of Shedden for a period of seven years in the 1870s.
