= Wayne Kellestine =

Canadian mass murderer

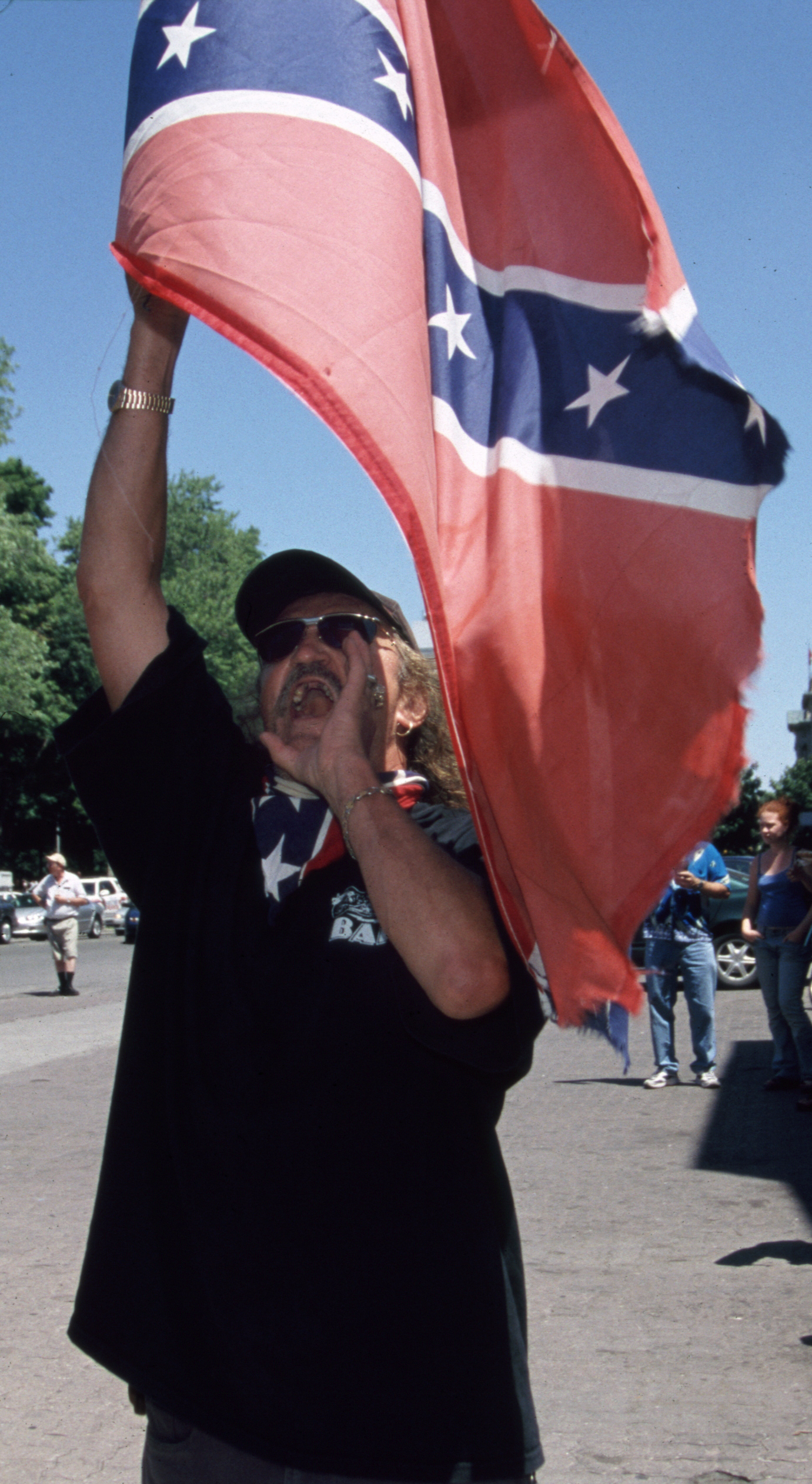
- Kellestine in 2005
- Born: Wayne Earl Kellestine; 1 May 1949 (age 77); Ontario, Canada
- Other name: "Wiener"
- Occupations: Outlaw biker; gangster
- Years active: 1967–2006
- Known for: Participant in the Shedden massacre
- Allegiance: Holocaust MC (1982–1988); Annihilators MC (1988–1999); Loners MC (1999–2001); Bandidos MC (2001–2006)
- Convictions: Violating narcotic and gun control laws (1992); Violating gun control laws (2002); First-degree murder (2009)
- Penalty: Two years' imprisonment (2002); Life imprisonment without parole (2009)

Wayne Earl Kellestine (born 1 May 1949), better known as "Weiner" Kellestine, is a Canadian outlaw biker, gangster, and convicted murderer, currently serving a life sentence for first-degree murder for his killing six out of the eight victims of the Shedden massacre of 2006.

== Early criminal career ==
Kellestine is of German descent. He claims that his ancestors were Hessians hired to fight for the British Crown during the American Revolutionary War who settled in the British colony of Upper Canada (modern Southern Ontario) after the Revolutionary War ended in 1783. The journalist Peter Edwards, the crime correspondent for The Toronto Star, wrote that Kellestine is a pathological liar and though he is of German descent, there is no evidence to support his claims that his ancestors were Hessians. Kellestine has likewise frequently claimed to have served in the Canadian Army, but Edwards wrote that this claim is false.

Kellestine has a long criminal record going back to 1967. In 2006, the Toronto Sun reported that since he turned 18 in 1967 that: "Kellestine amassed convictions for three counts of assault causing bodily harm, three for assault, three for possessing unregistered weapons and more than a dozen counts for various weapons, property and breach and escape charges." In the summer of 1967, Kellestine as an unruly teenager went on a crime spree that led to three convictions for assault and assault causing bodily harm. When Kellestine was arrested in April 2006, a policeman told the journalist Timothy Appleby of The Globe and Mail: "He's a guy who if you were to meet him, the hair on your neck would stand on end. This is one scary individual."

On 1 July 1977, when the Outlaws gang expanded into Canada and opened a chapter in London, Ontario by “patching over” the Satan's Choice chapter, Kellestine attempted to join, but was refused as he was considered to be a "heat score", slang for a criminal who continually draws police attention. In 1978, Kellestine was considered a suspect in the murder of Giovanni DiFilippo, although he was never charged. Kellestine was allowed to start the Annihilators Motorcycle Club based in St. Thomas, which existed as a puppet club to the Outlaws chapter in London. The clubhouse of the Annihilators was on 54 Mondamin street in St. Thomas.

At Kellestine's 1982 trial for assault, one of the witnesses testified that it was widely known in criminal circles that Kellestine had in 1978 murdered Giovanni DiFilippo, a Woodbridge, Ontario, businessman. DiFilippo had been killed while answering his door by an assassin disguised as a pizza delivery man, who pulled out a gun and shot him in the head. A police investigation established that Kellestine had almost certainly murdered DiFilippo, but there was insufficient evidence to bring charges against him. In 1982, Kellestine left Thorndale and purchased for $50,000, a farm near Iona Station at 32196 Aberdeen Line, buying another 52.33 acres of adjoining farm land in 1987. Kellestine's farmhouse was disorderly with rusting automobiles lying on the front lawn, through the farmhouse itself with unpainted pine finishing in the kitchen; stone fireplace in the living room; and a sauna and cedar hot tub in the basement was described as charming and cozy. However the Confederate and Nazi memorabilia marked the farmhouse as different and within the walls was Kellestine's secret gun caches, which he held despite two lifetime weapons bans.

In 1984, Kellestine paid a $700 fine after he was convicted of assaulting a bouncer in a London, Ontario bar. In 1985 Kellestine was arrested after being found with some $350,000 worth of cocaine and LSD together with an unregistered handgun, but the case was not pursued in the courts.

== Annihilators president ==
Kellestine became the president of the Annihilators, having at first founded a gang called the Holocaust before becoming the Annihilators president. On the outside of his barn, Kellestine painted the logo of the Annihilators, a mailed fist clenching a lightning bolt that resembled the lightning bolt runes of the SS. One biker who knew him said of Kellestine "...he wasn't the sharpest knife in the drawer." Kellestine often annoyed visitors to the Annihilator clubhouse by throwing roofing nails on the parking lot to deter the police from getting too close, which he would forget where he had placed, causing the tires of his guests' vehicles to be punctured.

In 1989, at a motorcycle show in London, Kellestine got drunk, assaulted a police officer, and attempted to flee by hijacking a limousine, leading to a car chase down the streets that ended at the Outlaws' clubhouse and his arrest, an incident that confirmed his "wild man" reputation. In June 1991, Kellestine shot Thomas Roger Harmsworth, a biker with the Outlaws gang, putting four bullets into his body, and was charged with attempted murder. Harmsworth was dropped off at the St. Thomas-Elgin general hospital, bleeding badly. The attempted murder charges were dropped when Harmsworth refused to testify against him. Harmsworth chose to follow the outlaw biker code by never testifying against another biker even if he was the victim of a crime committed by the said biker, and instead gave Kellestine an alibi.

Two days after the charges were dropped against Kellestine for the attempted murder of Harmsworth in January 1992, the body of David "Sparky" O'Neil was found in a shallow grave with three bullets in his skull. O'Neil was wanted for the murder of police constable Scott Rossiter on 19 September 1991, and it is generally believed that Kellestine was in some way involved with O'Neil's murder and led the police to his body in exchange for the charges of attempted murder against Harmsworth being dropped. O'Neil had often visited Kellestine's farm looking for shelter after he killed Rossiter. It was widely believed in Iona Station that Kellestine had killed O'Neil. After O'Neil's murder, Kellestine started to wear a special patch consisting of the SS lightning bolt runes on his biker jacket on the front alongside his Annihilator patch, which in the outlaw biker subculture indicates that one has committed a murder. Likewise, Kellestine started to sign his letters with the SS lightning bolt runes as he normally closed with his letters with: "Your brother always, Weiner, 1%er, SS". Without naming Kellestine as the killer, an Outlaw-turned police informer, Michael Simmons, stated in an interview that the Annihilators had killed O'Neil, saying: "He [O'Neil] wouldn't stay put. So they put him on ice". Simmons, the younger brother of the Outlaw national president, Andrew "Teach" Simmons, visited Kellestine's farmhouse where Kellestine pointed a .45 handgun at one of his toes and asked for permission to shoot it off; Simmons replied that he would prefer being shot in the head as he disliked pain. Kellestine found that answer hysterically funny and lowered his gun.

In early 1992, Kellestine sold a handgun, cocaine and ecstasy pills to an undercover policeman. On 12 March 1992, during a police crackdown codenamed Project Bandito on both the Annihilators and the Outlaws, Kellestine was arrested at his farm outside of the hamlet of Iona Station, being found drunk and high in his living room surrounded by guns, cocaine, cash and Nazi memorabilia. An evaluation by the prison psychologist done on 11 January 1993 declared about Kellestine "Criminality appears to be a matter of choice of lifestyle" for him and that he was a paranoid narcissist. Kellestine was sentenced to six years in prison as a result of the Project Bandito charges. The parole board twice denied Kellestine's applications, citing concerns that he had repeatedly failed drug tests while in prison. In late 1994, Kellestine was released on parole. Shortly afterwards, the body of a London woman, Sonya Nadine Mae Cywink, was found murdered in the Southwold Earthworks, near Kellestine's farmhouse . Her murder was never solved, but Edwards wrote that rumors in Iona Station claimed she had "done something to annoy Weiner Kellestine shortly before her murder". Aside from Nazi memorabilia, Kellestine also collected Confederate and Montreal Canadiens memorabilia. Kellestine was much feared in south-western Ontario, being widely seen as a wild-man with an extremely bad temper and an unpredictable streak.

Kellestine had a certain local notoriety as the man who liked to introduce himself as: "Hi, I'm Wayne Kellestine. I sell drugs and I kill people". Visitors to his farmhouse noted he would shoot his wife Linda with an air-gun for no apparent reason. In 2009, one of Kellestine's neighbors, a farmer who did not wish to be named, told Appleby: "He didn't bother us too much most of the time, but everybody knew he was trouble, there was often biker types around, and there was always talk that he had killed people". Journalist Bruce Owen, who has long covered outlaw bikers, wrote that Kellestine was "likely nuts, but not criminally insane." Kellestine had a deeply paranoid streak with his farm being surrounded by various security cameras and alarms. More than once, he was thrown into a state of panic in the wintertime when frost buildup would set off the alarms on the motion detector cameras at night, leading him to run around with one of his guns looking for any possible enemies. In an interview with the journalist Yves Lavigne, published in The London Free Press on 18 April 1998, the Annihilators were described by Lavigne as having "a low profile, making money on the drug trade."

Alongside his criminal activities, Kellestine was widely known in Iona Station for being a racist, an anti-Semite and a homophobe with his farmhouse full of Nazi memorabilia. Kellestine traveled to London every year to protest the local Gay Pride Day by waving the Confederate battle flag (he wanted to use the Nazi flag instead, but did not because he could be indicted for violating hate-crime laws). Kellestine's closest friend was another biker, David "Concrete Dave" Weiche, whose father Martin K. Weiche was a German immigrant who ran a local construction company. The elder Weiche, a Hitler Youth alumni and a Wehrmacht veteran, had one of the largest collections of Nazi memorabilia in Canada and in the 1968 election had run for the House of Commons as a National Socialist, winning 89 votes. Through the Weiche family, Kellestine had connections with various extreme right-wing groups in Canada and mowed a giant swastika into his fields in emulation of the swastika that the elder Weiche had mowed into the grass outside his house. The swastika in the field, though only visible from the air, gave Kellestine a certain amount of attention in southwestern Ontario. Besides farming, Kellestine ran a security firm whose name, Triple K Security with the three Ks that were prominently displayed on his business cards were a conscious evocation of the white supremacist group. The business literature for Triple K Security promised "complete electronic privacy", "telephone taps", "home intrusion alarms", and "discreet professional services". Starting in the late 1990s, Kellestine claimed to have served in a regiment of the Canadian Army that was disbanded in disgrace, a clear reference to the Canadian Airborne Regiment, which was disbanded in 1995. The Canadian Airborne Regiment was disbanded after hazing videos were released showing white soldiers abusing black soldiers and the revelation that soldiers of the Airborne regiment had tortured and murdered a Somali teenager in March 1993. Kellestine was trying to imply that he was in some way involved in these activities, but Edwards noted that Kellestine was in prison at the time of the Canadian Airborne's ill-fated peacekeeping mission in Somalia in 1992-1993 and that his criminal record would have had disqualified him from serving in the Army.

David Weiche had founded an anti-gay group called Bikers Against Pedophiles, which equated homosexuality with pedophilia, and demanded homosexuality be made illegal again. Kellestine promptly joined Bikers Against Pedophiles, and was very active in the group, leading Bikers Against Pedophiles in their annual protests against Gay Pride Day, presenting himself as a defender of children against "deviant" homosexuals. Every June, Kellestine and Weiche would lead the Bikers Against Pedophiles group to London to protest Gay Pride Day while chanting "faggots" and other anti-gay slogans. Despite his claim to be a moral force protecting children from homosexual pedophiles, Kellestine made a home movie showing an obese man sexually assaulting a young woman at his farmhouse which ended with Kellestine ordering the woman to bare her breasts for his camera. In 1997, Giovanni "Boxer" Muscedere joined the Annihilators and became a protégé of Kellestine.

== Facing the Hells Angels ==
In the 1990s, the Hells Angels were steadily taking over the outlaw biker scene in Canada, causing other bikers turn to the Bandidos club based in Houston, Texas as a counter. On 7 April 1998, Jeffrey LaBrash and Jody Hart, two leaders of the Outlaws biker gang, were gunned down leaving a strip club, the Beef Baron, by two men known to be associated with the Hells Angels in London, Ontario. LaBrash was the president of the London chapter of the Outlaws. His killers were brothers Paul and Duane Lewis.

A bikers' "rodeo" held by the shores of Lake Simcoe in August 1998, hosted by the Loners gang and attended by members of the Satan's Choice, Red Devils, Vagabonds, Last Chance and Para-Dice Riders gangs, was interrupted when the Hells Angels' elite Nomads chapter led by Walter Stadnick rode in unannounced from Montreal. The Hells Angels favored some of the bikers at the "rodeo" with their company while snubbing others. It was clear within the Ontario outlaw biker scene that henceforward one could be either for or against the Hells Angels.

On 15 December 1998, a London millionaire businessman, Salvatore Vecchio, who was widely believed to be linked with the Hells Angels, was murdered. His body was found buried in a swamp outside the Forest City as London is often called. Vecchio lived in a luxury condominium and was one of the few people in London, Ontario who owned a Ferrari. Besides real estate, Vecchio's fortune rested on the fact he was a loan shark and co-owner of a hardcore pornographic website with ties to both outlaw bikers and the Mafia. Vecchio had known the Lewis brothers and may have employed them as enforcers in his loan shark business. Because Vecchio's body was found close to Kellestine's farm and due to the similarity with O'Neil's murder in 1992, police believed that Kellestine was involved in Vecchio's murder, and may have been the gunman who killed him.

Vecchio had paid $30,000 out of the $50,000 bail which the court had imposed on the Lewis brothers charged with killing LaBrash and Hart. Subsequently, the Lewis brothers were acquitted in 1999 of killing LaBrash and Hart under the grounds of self-defense, claiming that LaBrash had pointed a gun at them in the Beef Baron parking lot that was not found at the crime scene. The defense claimed that the DJ at the Beef Baron, an Outlaw supporter, had removed the gun from LeBrash's corpse as part of a plot to frame the Lewis brothers. The DJ had fled back to his native Britain after the killings and was not available to contradict the defense's theory, which created sufficient doubt in the jury's minds to ensure the acquittal of the Lewis brothers. The significance of the killing of LaBrash and Hart was that for first time, people associated with the Hells Angels had killed within Ontario, showing the Hells Angels were deadly serious about their plans to expand from Quebec into Ontario.

On 2 June 1999, the Annihilators Motorcycle Club based in St. Thomas led by Kellestine joined the Loners club based in Woodbridge led by Gennaro "Jimmy" Raso. In face of the challenge from the Hells Angels, Kellestine decided he needed allies, and with the Outlaws being unwilling to accept him, he had decided to merge with the Loners instead. Kellestine, the Annihilators president become the new president of the Chatham chapter of the Loners at the time of the merger in 1999. Following Kellestine into the Loners was another Annihilator, Giovanni Muscedere.

For Kellestine and Muscedere, joining the Loners was a step up in the outlaw biker world, while the Loners – a disproportionate number of whom were Italian-Canadians from middle-class families – could barely hide their disdain for the Annihilators, whom they viewed as rustic bumpkins from south-western Ontario. The Loners had accepted the Annihilators because of the need to increase their numbers in face of the challenge from the Hells Angels. One Loner, an Irish immigrant, Glenn "Wrongway" Atkinson, was heard to remark after meeting Kellestine for the first time: "Can you believe the type of people we're attracting?" Kellestine explained to Atkinson that his nickname "Wayne the Weiner" was a reference to his penis size as he argued that he had a large "manhood", leading Atkinson to regard him as uncouth and vulgar. Kellestine called a party called Loners Rock & Pig Fest, where he showed Atkinson his secret gun cache. Atkinson was not impressed, saying: "That's a little foolish. You don't even know who I am, man. I could be an undercover cop as far you know". Atkinson came away from party convinced that Kellestine's intelligence was very low, saying he acted in a very reckless manner by showing a stranger his gun cache. However, the Loners came to value visiting Kellestine's farm as he had a seemingly endless number of false passports and false First Nations ID cards.

The police and media usually referred to the Loners under Kellestine as the London Loners or the St. Thomas Loners, but the gang always called themselves the Chatham Loners because their clubhouse was located in that city. The Globe and Mail reported in 2004 about the Hells Angels' push into south-western Ontario: "From 1999 to 2002, when the conflict reached a peak, beatings, brawls and shootings became common". Kellestine was opposed to having the Loners join the Hells Angels because he knew that the Hells Angels would accept most of the Loners' chapter, but never him. In October 1999, the Hells Angels sponsored an attempt to murder Kellestine after he vetoed an offer from the Hells Angels to join their club. The Hells Angels offered to have the Loners "patch over" to become Hells Angels, but Kellestine refused the offer, expelling all of the Loners who wanted to join the Hells Angels and had one pro-Hells Angels Loner beaten and pistol-whipped before he was expelled. One of the Loners, Jimmy Coates, had a brother, John, who was a member of the Sherbrooke chapter of the Hells Angels, and together the Coates brothers worked against Kellestine, attempting to foment a mutiny against Kellestine's leadership of his chapter of the Loners.

On 22 October 1999, in a drive-by shooting, a pro-Hells Angels Loner Davie "Dirty" McLeish and a Quebec Hells Angel from Sherbrooke, Philippe "Philbilly" Gastonguay, opened fire with a shotgun on Kellestine, who was sitting in his truck at a stop at the only intersection in Iona Station. McLeish and Gastonguay put several bullets into Kellestine's truck, but failed to hit him. After the assassination attempt, the police searched Kellestine's farm and discovered he had some 40-odd guns and a rocket launcher at his farm, which led him to be charged with violating Canada's gun control laws.

On 29 December 2000, most of the Ontario biker gangs such as Satan's Choice, the Vagabonds, the Lobos, the Last Chance, the Para-Dice Riders and some of the Loners travelled to Montreal to join the Hells Angels, making them at one stroke the dominant biker club in Ontario. As a result of the mass "patch-over" in Montreal, with 168 bikers becoming Hells Angels, the greater Toronto area went from having no Hells Angels chapters to having the highest concentration of Hells Angels' chapters in the world. One police officer told journalist Jerry Langton about the "patch over" in Montreal: "They [the Angels] were truly scraping the bottom of the barrel. They were trading patch for patch the legendary Hells Angel patch for some of the lowest of the low". Shortly afterwards in early 2001, the Hells Angels were reported to have issued an ultimatum to the prospect and hang-around Outlaws operating in Ontario to either retire or join the Hells Angels.

Pointedly, the Chatham chapter of the Loners were not invited to join the Hells Angels, through many of the Woodbridge chapter of the Loners did join the Hells Angels. On 12 April 2001, the Hells Angels opened a chapter in London and promptly informed the Loners that they did not have the right to use Ontario on their patch, as the Loners were only a "regional" club. Unable to stand on their own, the Chatham Loners joined the Bandidos on 22 May 2001 as probationary members, becoming full members on 1 December 2001. A complicating factor was that the Loners had been sponsored into the Bandidos by the Danish branch of the club, a move that was not sanctioned by the world headquarters of the Bandidos in Houston, Texas, making their extract status within the club somewhat problematic. However, it was agreed that even though the Danish branch of the Bandidos were responsible for the Canadian branch as their sponsors, the American branch would supervise the Canadian Bandidos.

At the time that Muscedere joined the Loners, he became close to another Loner and fellow Italian-Canadian, Frank "Bammer" Salerno, who to a certain extent displayed Kellestine as his best friend. In October 2001, Joey "Crazy Horse" Morin, president of the Edmonton chapter of the Rebels outlaw biker club, first contacted the Bandidos with the aim of "patching over". At a party at Kellestine's farm, Morin and the other Rebels were not impressed with Kellestine's eccentric behavior, seeing the Bandido treasurer Luis "Chopper" Raposo get high on various drugs and a "coked out" Muscedere lose his temper and beat up one of his "brothers" over a trivial matter. In July 2002, Kellestine was sentenced to two years in prison after being convicted of 22 counts of violating the laws governing guns, after the police discovered various illegal firearms at his farm in 1999.

== Sergeant-at-arms ==
In August 2004, after being released from prison following his conviction on gun and drug charges, Kellestine become the sargento de armas of the Canadian Bandidos, and was displeased at the way his former protegee Muscedere now overshadowed him. Edwards wrote that Muscedere was regarded as far preferable than Kellestine with his "... mercurial mood swings and stream-of-consciousness rantings, in which he somehow equated the Confederacy, the American Revolution and Nazism with goodness and Canada. Boxer Muscedere could barely read and write and didn't play historian, but he was straightforward, honest, fearless and loyal to a fault, which just fine with them". Muscedere often favored Kellestine by having Bandido meetings at his farm, despite the fact that most of the Toronto chapter lived in the greater Toronto area and resented the two hour drive to Iona Station. The fact that Kellestine did not own a working Harley-Davidson motorcycle, which was a major violation of the Bandido rules, while pressing for others to be expelled for not having a working Harley-Davidson motorcycle, made him unpopular. One who knew him stated: "He was Boxer's buddy, so he could pretty much get away with anything. He thought absolutely nothing of inconveniencing other people...He'd moan like a baby if he had to do something that wasn't to his liking".

In July 2004, Muscedere opened a new Bandido chapter in Winnipeg, whose members were only probationary members led by Michael Sandham. When Sandham indicated he wanted to join the Bandidos, one of the Bandido leaders, Frank "Cisco" Lenti, was highly suspicious of him, saying he kept hearing rumors that Sandham used to be a policeman and that he had been rejected by the Outlaws for that reason, and assigned Kellestine to investigate him. Lenti further noted that Sandham had no tattoos, which was unusual as almost all outlaw bikers have many tattoos on their bodies, his demeanor was like of a policeman doing a very clumsy impression of an outlaw biker, and Lenti noted that Sandham seemed like the sort of man who would have "sucked up" to the high school bully rather than stand up for himself. However, Kellestine reported that the rumors were not true, and Sandham had never been a policeman. Kellestine became close to Sandham.

Edwards wrote that outlaw biker clubs claim that they are all about freedom, but in reality outlaw biker clubs are rigid, rule-bound organizations run in a quasi-militaristic fashion with a strict hierarchy and rules governing every aspect of the members' existence. Within that context, making Kellestine the sergeant-at-arms responsible to president Muscedere, a man whom Kellestine had given orders to when he was the Annihilators' president, was the source of great resentment to him. One of Muscedere's neighbours in Chatham remarked to Edwards: "The puppet has cut his strings". After his release from prison, Kellestine visited the Holland House Restaurant and Tavern, an establishment that served as a restaurant, bar, used book store and curiosity shop in Iona Station. Kellestine told the owner, Marty Angenent, that he was unhappy that "business is not like it used to be". At the Bandido Christmas party in 2004, Kellestine became annoyed when the DJ kept playing rap music, leading him to go up to the DJ, pull out his gun, and say: "Stop playing this nigger stuff. Play Lynyrd Skynyrd or something better than this shit or I'll blow your foot off".

In June 2005, Kellestine shot one of his home films at his farmhouse. One of the guests revealed he was wearing a T-shirt with a clenched white fist alongside the slogan "white power", which led Kellestine to say "right on!" Kellestine focused his camera on the Nazi swastika flag hanging on the wall and sung the first stanza of Das Deutschlandlied, namely the lyrics deutschland, deutschland über alles. He then panned over his camera to the Confederate battle flag hanging on his wall, where he displayed his muddled understanding of history by saying: "That's the most beautiful flag in the world. I love that fucking flag. My great-great-great-great grandfather fought for the flag. The Confederates against the Yankees and the French. Fucking Yankee bastards". Edwards wrote that the way that Kellestine focused the attention onto himself even the camera was pointed at others reflected his narcissism. At the end of the film, Kellestine started to disparage Giovanni Muscedere and Luis Raposo after they had left his farm, telling his bodyguard Frank Mather and his friend Eric Niessen: "You guys are worth more than all of the guys from Toronto put together. I'm proud of you guys".

== Plotting a massacre ==
On 25 June 2005, Sandham visited Kellestine's farm to complain about the unwillingness of the Toronto chapter to make the Winnipeg chapters full members, asking for his support. In September 2005, Kellestine told Sandham that if he wanted to wear Bandido patches (which he had never been supplied with from Houston), he should just make his own, even though Bandido rules stated that anyone who wore a patch not supplied by Houston would be expelled. Edwards wrote that both Kellestine and Sandham displayed much narcissistic behavior and a contempt for all rules, which allowed them to justify doing anything they wanted. Sandham had also told Kellestine at this time that the "no surrender crew" were planning to "patch over" to join the Outlaws without him. Kellestine believed what Sandham had told him, and this bit of misinformation turned Kellestine against the "no surrender crew". For Kellestine, outlaw biking was his life, and to be left alone without belonging to any club would be a sort of death for him.

Kellestine had been ordered by Houston to "pull the patches" on the "no surrender crew" or be expelled himself. In March 2006, Kellestine asked the Winnipeg chapter for help. Kellestine, who frequently consumed the drugs he was supposed to sell and who was deeply in debt, with the bank frequently threatening to foreclose on the farm he bought in 1982, had discovered that selling methamphetamine was a lucrative business, and was greatly annoyed when Muscedere had ordered him to stop selling methamphetamine, on the grounds that it was wrong.

Muscedere was addicted to cocaine, but felt that selling methamphetamine was wrong and forbade all Bandidos from selling "crystal meth". Stratford, Ontario is regarded as the "meth-making capital" of Canada, as methamphetamine is usually manufactured in rural areas since it emits an unpleasant smell and needs anhydrous ammonia as an ingredient, a fertilizer commonly sold in rural stores. There was a huge demand for methamphetamine in Winnipeg. Kellestine believed an alliance would make him rich, as he held contacts with many of the methamphetamine makers in the countryside around Stratford while Sandham claimed to have underworld contacts in Winnipeg. The indebted Kellestine frequently complained that the other members were more interested having the chapter serve as a social club rather than as a money-making concern, which echoed the feelings of the American leadership of the Bandidos. Kellestine was behind in paying property taxes to Dutton/Dunwich township in Elgin county, owing the township some $10,303.30 in unpaid taxes, and frequently resorted to selling bootleg whiskey and smuggled cigarettes to pay his bills. The crime journalist Yves Lavigne told The London Free Press: "On a scale of one to 10, this group of Bandidos rated somewhere between one and zero".

On 7 March 2006, Sandham, Kellestine and the younger Weiche travelled to British Columbia to visit the Peace Arch Park on the American-Canadian border. American bikers generally cannot enter Canada, as most of them have criminal records and vice versa. The Peace Arch Park, where it is possible to hold a conversation without crossing the border, is a popular meeting place for Canadian and American bikers. An American Bandido, Peter "Mongo" Price, told Sandham and Kellestine that Houston was furious that the "no surrender crew" were still wearing Bandido patches despite being expelled in December 2005. Price was the national sergeant-at-arms of Bandidos USA, making him in charge of discipline, and accompanying him were Keinard "Hawaiian Ken" Post and Brian Bentley of the Washington state Bandidos. The fact that Price had flown from Houston to meet Kellestine and Sandham in the Peace Arch Park suggested he had something especially important to say, that he could not say on the phone or write in an email.

Price further informed Kellestine that he would become the new Canadian Bandido president if he succeeded in "pulling the patches" of the "no surrender crew", while the Winnipeg chapter would be granted "full patches", making them into full members. Price concluded by stating that both Kellestine and Sandham would be expelled as well if they failed with removing the patches being worn by the rogue Toronto chapter. At his trial in 2009, Sandham testified that Price who was representing Pike had told him that Muscedere and the rest of the "no surrender crew" were to be killed with Kellestine to become the new leader of the Canadian Bandidos as the reward. After the meeting in the Peace Arch Park, Weiche chose to remain in Vancouver, though he regularly exchanged phone calls with Sandham.

On 25 March 2006, Sandham announced to his followers that he had received orders from Houston to act against the "no surrender crew" and they were departing for Kellestine's farm without telling him that they were coming. Sandham assured his followers that Kellestine had plenty of guns at his farm, but he brought along a bullet-proof vest and a box of surgical gloves, saying he needed them to leave no fingerprints on the guns that Kellestine would provide. When Sandham arrived at Kellestine's farm, he lied to him by claiming not to know why he had been sent there, and told Kellestine that he would receive further orders from Houston. Kellestine was surprised by Sandham's visit, but he quickly took charge of his guests and provided them with weapons from his hidden cache of arms he kept at his farm. Arriving to help Kellestine with "pulling the patches" were Sandham together with three other Winnipeg Bandidos, namely Dwight "Big Dee" Mushey, a kickboxer and boxer who owned and managed a strip club; Marcello "Fat Ass" Aravena, a tae kwon do enthusiast and a bouncer in Mushey's strip club; a former iron-worker from Calgary named Brett "Bull" Gardiner, whom Mushey had recruited into the Bandidos; and another man known only as M.H. Despite two lifetime bans on possessing weapons, the self-proclaimed "gun nut" Kellestine continued to collect guns and had a large collection of guns and ammunition at his farm. Kellestine also produced what he called his "wet work kit" for cleaning up after murders, consisting of hydrochloric acid and rubber gloves, saying he always used his "wet work kit" after he killed somebody.

Joining them was a man that Kellestine had recruited, a career criminal from New Brunswick with a long record for home invasions, Frank Mather, who was serving as his bodyguard. Kellestine had met Mather in prison and provided him with a home for himself and his pregnant girlfriend, Stefanie. Mather was a Bandidos supporter and hoped that Kellestine would sponsor him into the club. Mather was on parole after being convicted of attempting to steal a truck, and after being kicked out of a London motel for not paying the bills, Mather had arrived at Kellestine's farm. During the trial in 2009, the Crown Attorney prosecuting the case, Kevin Gowdey, took to referring to the men gathered at Kellestine's farm as the "farm crew" and it is by that name that they are known. Kellestine's guests complained that Kellestine's farmhouse was full of ticks, that the toilet barely functioned and that the only food to eat were frozen pizzas Kellestine had hijacked from a truck. Kellestine treated the junior Bandidos like Aravena and Gardiner like slaves, expecting them to do all of his housework for them. Gardiner was a man of very limited intelligence, whom Kellestine had once asked to supply him with pickles from a "pickle tree" growing on his farm, which led him to spend hours looking for the elusive "pickle tree" before telling Kellestine that he couldn't find it. Sandham and the other Bandidos later described Kellestine as an odd and eccentric character who liked to eat animal excrement to prove how tough he was as an outlaw biker, and that he always laughed madly as the others looked on with disgust as he devoured whatever excrement he found lying on the ground. Aravena recalled that Kellestine would smile and say "mm-mm good" before eating excrement, which led him to the conclusion that Kellestine was a "little bit of a weirdo".

At the beginning of April 2006, Kellestine accused one of the "no surrender crew", Jamie Flanz, of being a police informer. As Flanz was Jewish and the rabidly anti-Semitic Kellestine hated him for that, Muscedere did not take the allegation seriously, but to settle the matter, it was agreed that the "no surrender crew" would visit Kellestine's farm to discuss his claims. Most of the "no surrender crew" lived in the Toronto area, but Kellestine insisted that the meeting be held at his farm, and Muscedere agreed. Kellestine also stated that Sandham and some other members of the Winnipeg chapter were staying with him, which was intended as a "bait" as knew that relations between Muscedere and Sandham were very poor. Edwards wrote: "He would have known that the No Surrender Crew had failed in their bid not only to kill Sandham in Winnipeg, but to even locate him. The trap had been set. The hunters were now the hunted". Muscedere and the "no surrender crew" were planning to "pull the patch" on Kellestine, whose racist paranoia had become too much for them.

One of the bikers invited to the meeting, Paul "Big Paulie" Sinopoli, in the week preceding the meeting was overheard by the Ontario Provincial Police (OPP) listening in on his phone conversations repeatedly trying to find an excuse not to visit Kellestine's farm, saying he was feeling unwell. Salerno told Sinopoli that if he failed to attend the meeting and bring some $550 he owed in arrears to the club he would be expelled. Kellestine also phoned Sinopoli to tell him: "Uh, I haven't heard from you for a while. What's up, buds? You don't love me no more?" Kellestine then began to sing the 1960 Elvis Presley song "It's Now or Never", saying he wanted Sinopoli to prove he loved his biker "brothers" by coming to the meeting.

In a phone call recorded by the police, on 5 April, Kellestine phoned the mother of another Bandido, Cameron Acorn, to tell her she should tell her son: "Fire in the hold!" In a phone call to Acorn himself on 6 April, one of the principal suspects in the murder of drug dealer Shawn Douse, who was in the Central North Correctional Centre in Penetanguishene, Kellestine stated:

The people in the States are super, super, super fuckin' choked [biker slang for being angry] ... And don't say a word, just ... uh ... just leave it at that ... For some strange reason, they [the American leadership] seem to ... oh fuck ... anyways, there's going to be some major changes, man ... I'm telling you right now you protect yourself ... it's not my doing. I want no part of this, but I'm gonna trying to salvage as many guys as possible.

When Acorn realized that the "changes" that Kellestine was referring to was killing the "no surrender crew", he told him "That's fuckin' bullshit" while Kellestine told him "Love you buddy" before hanging up. Edwards argued that despite Kellestine's protestations that he was being forced to act that he appeared to be "gloating" in his call to Acorn. Kellestine had decided to "pull the patches" on the "no surrender crew", revoking their claim to call themselves Bandidos and then chosen to liquidate the "no surrender crew" when he realized that they would not take kindly to losing their prized Bandidos patches.

== The massacre ==
On the night before the massacre, Kellestine had his common-law wife, Tina Fitzgerald, and his daughter together with Mather's girlfriend leave his farm, saying no women could be present at the "church" meeting (in the world of outlaw biking a "church" meeting is a mandatory meeting for the chapter). On the night of 7 April 2006, a meeting at Kellestine's farm attended by the two factions began at about 10:30 PM, when the "no surrender crew" entered his barn. The barn was full of rusting machinery, old furniture, and children's toys while its walls were decorated with pornographic photographs of buxom young women sitting atop Harley-Davidson motorcycles or half-dressed as construction workers together with "Kellestine's usual Nazi propaganda". Kellestine instructed his guests to stay in the middle where he had cleared out some space.

Sandham was standing in the rafters with a rifle while Mushey, Mather, Aravena and M.H. were patrolling outside armed with rifles and shotguns, and Gardiner listened to the police scanners inside Kellestine's house. Accordingly, to one version of the events, upon entering the barn, Luis "Chopper" Raposo saw Sandham with his rifle, and realizing that he had been betrayed fired at him with his sawed-off shotgun. Sandham was only slightly injured as he was wearing a bullet-proof vest, returned fire and killed Raposo. However, Raposo's favorite gesture was to "give the finger", and the autopsy revealed at the time of his death, Raposo had raised his middle finger while the rest of his fingers clinched into his fist and that Sandham's bullet had gone through Raposo's raised finger, shattering it completely. The forensic evidence does not support's Sandham's claim that Raposo had fired at him, and moreover Sandham is a "well known pathological liar" not known for his willingness to take responsibility for his actions. It is not entirely clear what happened other than Raposo was giving Sandham the finger at the time when Sandham used his skills as a marksman to put a bullet through it. Two of the "no surrender crew", Paul "Big Paulie" Sinopoli and George "Crash" Kriarakis attempted to flee, but were shot down and wounded by Kellestine who was armed with a handgun. Kellestine shouted: "Everybody get on the floor! Nobody move! I'm here to pull your patches. This is being done by the orders of the States [the U.S leadership of the Bandidos]". Langton wrote "Then things got a bit weirder" as Kellestine for reasons that remain understandable only to himself started to sing the first stanza of Das Deutschlandlied, which is rarely sung in Germany today because of its Nazi associations. Kellestine singing of the stanza "Deutschland, Deutschland über alles!" ("Germany, Germany above all else!") over and over again while waving about his handgun caused everyone else to be very confused as to what he was going to do. Muscedere in response led his followers into the Lord's Prayer for Raposo, which caused Kellestine to stop singing and instead dropped to one knee to join them. Kellestine then told Aravena to get him beer and water for the rest. Kellestine also told Aravena to tell the men on the roof everything was fine, which confused Aravena as there was no-one on the roof.

Kellestine pistol-whipped Flanz several times and told him: "I'm saving you for last, you fucking Jew!" Several times, Kellestine rammed his gun into Flanz's face, told he would be killed right that moment, and then said "just kidding" as he enjoyed seeing the look of terror on Flanz's face. Kellestine left the barn to talk with Sandham and Mushey while ordering Aravena, M.H. and Mather to stand guard. Kellestine told Mather to shoot Muscedere, who was the prisoner he feared the most, if he tried to get up. When Kellestine returned, he ordered George Jessome to sit in a plastic lawn chair, placed a blanket over him and gave him a cigarette. Kelletine apologized to Jessome for smashing his face with his gun, saying he hoped they were still friends. Kellestine then turned his attention towards Sinopoli and told him it was his only fault he was shot, saying he did not want to hurt him, but had been forced to shoot him when he tried to flee from the barn, going on to repeat his statement he hoped they were still friends. Kellestine then demanded that all of his prisoners hand over all of their Bandido gear starting with their vests with the Bandidio patches. Kellestine told Muscerdere he would have to be shackled, saying: "It's not that I don't trust you. It's just that I don't trust you". Kellestine seemed to find this remark most amusing as he broke out laughing. Kellestine then began to sing Das Deutschlandlied again and ordered Jessome out of the barn, telling him to use his tow truck to move Raposo's automobile. While Kellestine was directing Jessome outside, Sandham remained inside to rant about his issues with the "no-surrender crew" and forced Sinopoli to confess at gunpoint that he had been stealing the monthly dues he had been mailing from Winnipeg.

Over the next two hours, Kellestine frequently changed his mind about whatever he was going to "pull the patches" or execute the "no surrender crew", and at one point allowed Muscedere to call his girlfriend, Nina Lee, on his cell phone provided he "didn't say anything fucking stupid". Muscedere told Lee: "How's the baby? I'll see you in a couple hours. I love you." The macho Muscedere decided to be faithful to the outlaw biker's code of never asking for help, and did not alert Lee to his predicament, instead asking about how their daughter Angelina was doing. Kellestine drank heavily over the course of the night and ranted to his prisoners about his grievances with them. Kriarakis, who was wounded in the thigh, prayed to God and asked that his captors to spare him as his family would miss him and he had a wife he loved back at home, but was told to shut up. As Kriarakis prayed in Greek while Sinopoli cried, saying he never wanted to come to Kellestine's farm, which led to both men being told by another prisoner, Francesco "Bammer" Salerno: "We're bikers. We're not the fucking Boy Scouts, so stop your whining". A number of times Kellestine walked over and kicked the bleeding Salerno in the head as he called him a "fucking goof" (an insult that is considered to be the worse insult in the Canadian underworld). Several times, Kellestine asked Muscedere to join him despite the way he was attempting to depose him as national president, but he firmly declined, who instead asked for an ambulance be called for Sinopoli and Kriarakis, who were bleeding to death. Muscedere also defended Flanz from charges of being disloyal; Kellestine was an admirer of Nazi Germany and had issues with the Jewish Flanz. Finally, Kellestine decided to execute the "No Surrender crew" and they were all taken out one by one and shot execution-style, in what the Ontario Court of Appeal described the killings as "an execution assembly line".

As the men were marched out and shot, Kellestine, who been drinking very heavily that night, danced a jig while singing Das Deutschlandlied. Between dancing his jig while singing Das Deutschlandlied and executing his prisoners, Kellestine would go over to torment Flanz. Realizing he was doomed, Muscedere stated: "Do me. Do me first. I want to go out like a man." Kellestine personally executed Muscedere, who had once been his friend. Muscedere was marched out of the barn and forced to sit in his car. Muscedere in his last moments of his life burst out laughing at Kellestine for reasons that remain unknown. Kellestine shot him in the head at point-blank range, followed by another shot to his chest. A police wiretap recorded that Mushey told Aravena about Muscedere's execution: "This guy, he went out like a man...He laughed. Went out like a man." The next to be killed was Kriarakis, who prayed in Greek, as he went out and was shot. Mushey speaking to M.H. some weeks later and unaware that the latter was wearing a wire, said he was surprised by how much Kriarakis cried as he was marched out to be shot, saying he expected a fellow outlaw biker to be tougher. George "Pony" Jessome, a 52-year-old tow truck driver dying of cancer who only joined the Bandidos because he wanted some friends, went out next, not saying a word.

Sinopoli was taken to be shot, crying and screaming hysterically, saying that he had really wished that he not attended this meeting as he had wanted to. Sinopoli was shot and survived while Kellestine's gun jammed. Sinopoli continued to cry out his eyes and scream that he did not want to die, leading to Kellestine to shout: "Shut up and die like a man!". Aravena then had to fetch Kellestine another gun, which he then used to finish off Sinopoli who had been left bleeding and in great pain in the interval. One of the killers who later turned Crown's evidence, known as only as "MH", stated one of the victims, Frank "Bammer" Salerno, tried to shake his hand with MH testifying in 2009: "Bammer went to shake my hand. I didn't do it. Dwight did." Salerno also tried to shake Aravena's hand, but he declined, saying: "I'm not shaking your hand". As Salerno was marched out to be shot, his last words to his killers were to think of his newly born son, Mario. Flanz and another of the "no surrender crew", Michael "Little Mickey" Trotta were ordered to clean up the blood on the ground, using bleach. At this point, Kellestine began to rant about how he was such a hard worker who was doing such a great job killing the "no surrender crew", who were not thankful for his hard work, as if he expected them to appreciate his work in killing them. Trotta was taken out next and was ordered to sit in the same car containing the corpses of Sinopoli and Salerno. After Trotta sat down, Kellestine executed him. As Kellestine went in and out of his barn with prisoners to kill, none of his colleagues, the majority of whom had guns, made any effort to free the prisoners or to shoot Kellestine, though they were all to claim at the trial that they wanted to stop Kellestine.

By this point, Kellestine was too drunk to kill Flanz, and instead Sandham shot him in the head. Sandham was too nervous to aim properly despite shooting at point-blank range, and Flanz was still alive after Sandham had shot him. As Flanz looked up with a sad expression, as if begging with his eyes to save his life, Sandham could not bring himself to kill him, claiming his gun was jammed. Finally, Mushey, who was a more experienced killer than Sandham, took his gun and proved it was not jammed by finishing off Flanz with another shot to the head.

Afterwards, Kellestine ordered the bodies be placed into their vehicles. Nobody wanted to drive Muscedere's car with his body in the driver's seat and the entire front seats soaked in blood, so his car was attached to Jessome's tow truck. Kellestine had planned to take the bodies up the Ontario Highway 401 and dump them in Kitchener, which was known as a stronghold of the Hells Angels, out of the belief the police would blame them, but he did not buy enough gas for the trip, forcing the killers to abort the trip to Kitchener, with the bodies dumped in a farmer's field chosen at random only because they could not go any further up the 401. Mather who was driving Flanz's Infiniti reported the vehicle was almost out of gas, and turned into a farmer's field where the Stafford Line met the 401 highway. The bodies and vehicles dumped in the farmer's field were not burned because the killers were "too cheap to buy enough gasoline" to set them afire. Kellestine who remained at his farm was surprised when the "farm crew" returned after about half an hour, asking: "How fucking far did you guys go? I thought I told you to take them all the way to Kitchener". Afterwards, the "farm crew" went to work destroying the evidence, burning some of the items that belonged to the victims while keeping some for themselves. Edwards stated: "I don't think Kellestine would've been that dangerous that night if it wasn't for Sandham, the cop. They needed Sandham's ambition, and Kellestine's craziness.""

As the victims had last been seen alive entering Kellestine's farm and the bodies were found close to his farm, he was considered to be a prime suspect right from the start. Shortly after the massacre, James "Ripper" Fullager, the mentor to the "no surrender crew", died of cancer and on his deathbed complained that the Canadian outlaw biking scene had gone downhill since his youth in the 1960s, as now most "bikers" didn't know how to ride motorcycles and the outlaw biker code no longer counted with biker "brothers" killing each other. Meeting with Atkinson on his deathbed, Fullager commented it was clear that Kellestine had committed the massacre as the bodies were found close to Kellestine's farm in south-western Ontario, all of the victims except Muscedere came from the greater Toronto area, and Kellestine was still alive. Fullager noted that if the Hells Angels had massacred the Bandidos in south-western Ontario close to Kellestine's farm, they would have killed Kellestine as well.

== Investigation, trial, and conviction ==
The same day the bodies were found, Detective Inspector Paul Beesley of the OPP, who was in charge of the investigation, had asked a judge for a search warrant for Kellestine's farm. At about 3:05 pm, two of Kellestine's friends, Kerry Morris and Eric Niessen, arrived at his farm to help him destroy the evidence and to discuss the alibi they were planning on giving him. The alibi was that Niessen and Morris had spent the night of 7 April drinking beer with Kellestine at his farmhouse and that was all that happened there that night. The police had stationed cars on the Aberdeen Line and observed Morris and Niessen helping Kellestine clean his barn. A journalist from the A-Channel TV in London, Sararh McGarth, called Kellestine to inquire if he had been killed, saying that there were rumors he was one of the victims of the massacre, only for Kellestine to mockingly tell her: "Hang on for a sec. Am I alive? Geez, I've been with a house full of people in here for the last two days. I think I'm alive." When McGarth asked him "Are you the Wayne Kellestine that's been involved in some of the shootings over the years?", he replied "no, hell, no". Later that day, Muscedere's younger brother, Cesideio, called Kellestine to ask him if he knew anything about his brother's murder. Kellestine in response asked him: "Have you been to the police?"

At about 7 pm on 8 April 2006, the OPP arrived at his farmhouseto take Kellestine in for questioning, leading to a tense stand-off as Kellestine at first refused to come out. When Kellestine finally came out, he was taken to the local OPP station for questioning. Kellestine was arrogant and cocky, telling the arresting detectives: "I am invincible. I am ten feet tall and invincible". Perhaps realizing his show of nonchalance and braggadocio was inappropriate for a man who was supposed to be grieving for his biker "brothers" who had been just massacred the previous night, Kellestine pretended to cry and told the detectives: "I wish that they would have put a gun to my head and killed me too". When the detectives pointed out that the cause of death for the "Shedden 8" victims had been not released to the media and asked Kellestine how he knew the victims had been shot, leading for him to say that he wished had been stabbed or killed in whatever the manner the victims had been killed.

At about 9: 07 pm, Detective Constable Jeff Gateman of the OPP's Anti-Biker Enforcement Unit started to interview Kellestine. Kellestine was combative, denying any knowledge of the murderers, at one point answering Gateman's question if he had committed the murders by saying: "That's a dumb fucking question. How could you say that to me?" Shortly after midnight, Kellestine was told that he was under arrest and facing 8 counts of first-degree murder. When Kellestine was taken to the court for face his arraignment, he expressed much fury about being mistaken in the media for his first cousin, Wayne Forest Kellestine, a career bank robber well known for his incompetence who always captured within minutes of his crimes. Kellestine made a point of insisting that he was Wayne Earl Kellestine, not Wayne Forest Kellestine. Edwards wrote that Kellestine's pride in not being his cousin was misplaced as it took the police about an average of 10 minutes to arrest Wayne Forest for his crimes while it only taken the police about 10 hours to arrest Wayne Earl for his role in the massacre.

A massive forensic investigation had begun on the Kellestine farm, and by May the police had found in the fireplace the charred keys to the houses and apartments of the "Shedden Eight" murder victims, and a partially burned business card reading ONICO, the name of Flanz's computer company. On 24 May 2006, Constable Al Dubro discovered under Kellestine's microwave a secret doorway, where the police found Kellestine's gun cache. Dubro called Beesley, who found 18 guns in Kellestine's gun cache. Ballistic tests showed some of the guns found in Kellestine's cache were the murder weapons. On one of the handguns, a Mossberg, was found microscopic traces of blood, which DNA testing showed came from Flanz, Kriarakis, Sinopoli, Jessome and Salerno while on another handgun, a Hi-Point .380, had microscopic blood traces from Trotta and Sinopoli. The floor of Kellestine's barn was found to be soaked in hydrochloric acid from Kellestine's "wet work kit". Inside Kellestine's farmhouse, the police found a ring that had skin flakes embedded in it; DNA testing showed that the skin came from Flanz.

On January 9, 2007, a preliminary hearing for all six suspects began in a court in London, Ontario, under extraordinarily tight security. On the first day of the proceeding, Kellestine gave reporters the finger and swore at a courtroom artist. A gag order was issued prohibiting media reports on the evidence presented in the hearing. On 27 March 2008, someone burned down Kellestine's farmhouse, through the barn was still standing.

== Trial ==
The murder trial for Aravena, Gardiner, Kellestine, Mather, Mushey and Sandham commenced on March 31, 2009, in London, Ontario, with all six of the accused entering pleas of not guilty. The senior Crown Attorney (prosecutor) on the case was Kevin Gowdey assisted by junior Crown Attorneys Fraser Kelly, Tim Zuber, David D'Iorio and Meredith Gardiner. Kellestine was defended by Clay Powell, a Toronto lawyer best known for defending Keith Richards of The Rolling Stones after he was arrested for heroin possession in Toronto in 1977.

During the trial, Powell and McMillian portrayed Sandham as a cold-blooded, ruthless schemer who manipulated Kellestine into committing the murders; Crawford and Cudmore portrayed Kellestine as a bloodthirsty, deranged psychopath who pressured Sandham into committing the massacre; and the lawyers for the rest blamed both Sandham and Kellestine for their actions of their clients. Kellestine's defense lawyers argued that he was merely the victim of the scheming Sandham and suggested that Sandham was planning to murder Kellestine. McMillan argued that far from being scared of Kellestine that the Winnipeg chapter had sought out Kellestine because of his eccentricies such as eating animal excrement. During the trial, there was much mutual contempt between Mushey and Kellestine with Mushey reportedly beating up Kellestine several times in jail as punishment for letting himself be arrested so easily. During the trial, Mushey took much pleasure in humiliating Kellestine in the courtroom and always broke out laughing as Kellestine fumed in fury at being made to appear a fool. Kellestine tried to have Aravena commit perjury, telling him the courtyard of the jail to "be nice to your Uncle Wayne", saying that Aravena should testify that Mushey, M.H. and Sandham had committed the murders.

During the trial, Kellestine sent a note to the journalist Jane Sims of The London Free Press, asking for a free subscription to her paper since he was doing so much to help sell her newspaper. Kellestine shared the same cell block at the Elgin-Middlesex Detention Centre with the child killer Michael Thomas Rafferty, charged with killing 8-year-old Victoria Stafford, which led Kellestine to complain to the media about being forced to share the same cell block with him, saying that either Rafferty should be moved to another cell block or placed in the same cell with him so he could murder him. In his final address to the jury, Powell portrayed Kellestine as the victim of the scheming Sandham who arrived at his farmhouse unannounced. Powell admitted that Kellestine was not the most likeable of men, but accused Sandham and M.H. of perjury in their testimony, claiming that they were the real killers.

On October 29, 2009, the jury returned 44 guilty verdicts for first degree murder and four for manslaughter, believed to be the largest number of murder convictions ever produced from a single criminal proceeding in Canada. When the jury announced that Kellestine was guilty on all counts, he shrugged his shoulders and gave an enigmatic smile. Kellestine appealed his verdict under the grounds that his collection of Nazi paraphernalia including the authentic "German swastika flag" he had hanging in his barn should not have been introduced as evidence at the trial. In 2009, the journalist Timothy Appleby described Kellestine's farm at 32196 Aberdeen Line as a "spooky place" that: "From a few hundred metres away, the crime scene looks like any other Ontario rural property on a late fall afternoon: Rolling fields, a clutch of buildings, cows grazing in the distance. But up close ... it feels decidedly more sinister". Appleby noted the farmhouse had been burned down in an act of arson, but the barn at 32196 Aberdeen Line was still standing with the giant Annihilators Motorcycle Club logo painted on the sides.

== Life in prison ==
Kellestine is currently serving a life sentence for first degree murder with no chance of parole for 25 years. In 2014, Kellestine sought to appeal his guilty conviction, claiming that he was poorly served by Powell and that his reputation made it impossible for him to get a fair trial. One who knew him stated "that's just Wayne being Wayne" as he made various complaints about prison life such as having to wear a prison uniform and living in segregation. The journalist Randy Richmond of The London Free Press wrote about Kellestine's claim that his reputation had been maligned that: "As for the notoriety, Kellestine himself worked hard to cultivate it by running different motorcycle gangs, parading his anti-gay, pro-Nazi sentiments in public, and creating a well-known biker hangout complete with giant logo on a barn, and engaging in violent crime." Kellestine's appeal was rejected.

In December 2019, south-western Ontario was thrown into a state of fear when it was reported that Wayne Kellestine had escaped and was roaming about London, Ontario. However, the escaped Kellestine-who had wandered away from an old age home-was Wayne Forest Kellestine, the first cousin of Wayne Earl Kellestine, for whom he is frequently mistaken.

== Books ==
- Baker, Thomas (2014), Biker Gangs and Transnational Organized Crime, Routledge, ISBN 978-1317524113
- Caine, Alex (2009), The Fat Mexican: The Bloody Rise of the Bandidos Motorcycle Club, Random House, ISBN 978-0-30735-660-4
- Edwards, Peter (2010), The Bandido Massacre; A True Story of Bikers, Brotherhood and Betrayal, HarperCollins Publishers Ltd, ISBN 978-1-5546-8044-3
- Langton, Jerry (2010), Showdown: How the Outlaws, Hells Angels and Cops Fought for Control of the Streets, John Wiley & Sons, ISBN 978-0470678787
- Schnedier, Stephen (2009), Iced: The Story of Organized Crime in Canada, John Wiley & Sons, ISBN 978-0470835005
- Winterhalder, Edward; De Clercq, Wil (2008), The Assimilation: Bikers United Against The Hells Angels, ECW Press, ISBN 978-1-55022-824-3
