= Brett Gardiner =

Canadian outlaw biker and gangster (born 1984)

- Born: 19 June 1984 (age 42); Calgary, Alberta, Canada
- Other name: "Bull"
- Occupations: Outlaw biker; gangster; iron worker
- Known for: Participant in the Shedden massacre
- Allegiance: Bandidos MC
- Convictions: First-degree murder and manslaughter (2009)
- Penalty: Life imprisonment (2009)

Brett Gardiner (born 19 June 1984) is a Canadian outlaw biker and gangster serving a life sentence for his role in the Shedden massacre of 2006.

== Bandidos ==
Gardiner was born in Calgary and worked as an ironworker. His parents, Brian and Beth Gardiner, were Welsh immigrants who arrived in Canada in 1976. Gardiner is an avid reader and an amateur poet. Gardiner had moved to Winnipeg, where he was recruited into the Winnipeg chapter of the Bandidos by Dwight "Big Dee" Mushey. He lived as a boarder in Mushey's house along with Marcello "Fat Ass" Aravena. Like Aravena, Gardiner did not own nor know how to ride a motorcycle. The Bandidos Motorcycle Club is a criminal organization that poses as a motorcycle club, and almost all of the members of the Winnipeg Bandido chapter did not know how to ride motorcycles.

On 25 March 2006, the Winnipeg chapter president Michael "Taz" Sandham announced to his followers that he had received orders from American Bandido leaders in Houston to act against the "no surrender crew", as the Toronto chapter was called, and they were departing for the farm of Wayne "Wiener" Kellestine without telling him that they were coming. Gardiner was one of those chosen to go to Kellestine's farm. Peter Edwards, the crime correspondent of The Toronto Star described Gardiner as a weak character, as "someone who was continually in search of guidance" who was very loyal to Sandham. Gardiner did not have a reputation for violence, but was known as someone who would do anything to advance Sandham's plans, which was why Sandham had chosen him to go with him to Kellestine's farm.

Kellestine treated the junior Bandidos like Aravena and Gardiner like slaves, expecting them to do all of his housework for them. Gardiner had to bring Kellestine water, cooked his meals, washed his dishes and chopped his wood. Gardiner was a man of very limited intelligence, whom Kellestine in a joke had once asked to supply him with pickles from a "pickle tree" growing on his farm, which led him to spend hours looking for the elusive "pickle tree" before telling Kellestine that he could not find it. Finally, Kellestine broke out laughing, telling Gardiner that pickles were vegetables, not fruits and the assignment was a joke to prove to the others just how low his intelligence really was.

On the night of 5 April 2006, Gardiner wrote a poem to his girlfriend whom he called "Baby Jessica" entitled Love Not Lost on Kellestine's computer that read: "I choked back tears as I watched you leave/This was something I could not believe/I held back whimpers as I watched you go/An event that would lead to everlasting sorrow/You met me by the sparking lake/And I immediately forgot my heartache/We kissed and held each other very near/The beating of our hearts was all we could hear/Then we walked away, hand-in-hand/We had just entered dreamland". The poem ended with Gardiner writing in capital letters in his own hand: "YOU WILL ALWAYS BE IN MY HEART. PROSPECT BANDIDO BULL, MANITOBA". Gardiner's poem with his claim that he was a "prospect" (the second level in an outlaw biker club) was to be crucial evidence against him at his trial in 2009.

=== Shedden massacre ===
At the beginning of April 2006, Kellestine accused one of the "no surrender crew", Jamie "Goldberg" Flanz, of being a police informer. As Flanz was Jewish and the rabidly anti-Semitic Kellestine hated him for that, the Bandidos national president Giovanni "Boxer" Muscedere did not take the allegation seriously, but to settle the matter, it was agreed that the "no surrender crew" would visit Kellestine's farm to discuss his claims. As part of the preparations for the massacre, Gardiner searched the grounds of Kellestine's farm for old shotgun shells that might turn up during a police search (Kellestine was under two lifetime weapons bans). Gardiner cleaned the guns from Kellestine's gun cache with a wire brush.

On the night of 7 April 2006, Gardiner was ordered to stay in Kellestine's house, listening to the police scanners. Gardiner had no gun, but he had a phone right next to him as he listened to the police scanners. Edwards noted that Gardiner could have called the police anytime he wanted to stop the massacre and never did. During the massacre, Gardiner heard the shots and came outside, saying: "Did you fucking hear that? I should go check on Wayne". Mushey told him to go back inside the house and ordered Frank Mather to make certain that he went back to the scanners. Mushey barked at Gardiner: "Shut your fucking mouth! Go back in the house". Gardiner was present when the last of the "no-surrender crew", Jamie Flanz, was killed. Gardiner removed the children's toys from a Pontiac Grand Prix that belonged to Michael "Little Mikey" Trotta to make room for Flanz and watched as Flanz sat down in the car. Sandham shot Flanz who survived his wound and proved incapable of killing him, claiming his gun was jammed. Mushey took the gun from Sandham and proved that it was not jammed by shooting Flanz between the eyes.

After the massacre, Gardiner helped clean up the crime scene and destroyed evidence. Sandham promoted Aravena and Gardiner up to "full patch" Bandidos early on the morning of 8 April. Gardiner chose not to return to Winnipeg and instead decided to stay with Kellestine despite his desire to return to Winnipeg to see his girlfriend. Gardiner's decision to stay with Kellestine was used at his trial as evidence that he was not afraid of Kellestine. Gardiner was arrested on the night of 8 April 2006 at Kellestine's farmhouse and charged with first-degree murder. The journalist Jerry Langton wrote: "Inside the barn, the police found blood spatters and bits of human flesh and hair among the beer bottles and Nazi flags. Gardiner had done a lousy job cleaning up".

On 17 June 2006, Gardiner called his girlfriend, Jessica McDowell, from his jail cell saying that someone in the Winnipeg chapter was making "an eight-hour video", which was his way of saying that another member of the Winnipeg chapter, a man known only as M.H. due to a court order, had turned Crown's evidence and had made an eight-hour long video confession for the police. McDowell asked if he was excited about celebrating his birthday in jail the coming Monday, leading him to sarcastically say: "Yeah, a whole lot excited". Gardiner's mother phoned him on 18 June 2006 to urge him to turn Crown's evidence, saying that testifying against the others was his best chance of receiving a lesser sentence given that he was facing charges of first-degree murder. She stated she had spoken with the Crown Attorney handling the case, and he was open to a plea bargain with Gardiner out of the account of his age and that he had not killed anyone. Gardiner rejected his mother's advice, saying he would be loyal to his biker "brothers" and that "The only thing I'm going to say is 'here's my lawyers' number'" if an offer to turn Crown's evidence was made to him.

Gardiner was charged along with Mather and Aravena with "constructive first-degree murder", meaning that although the three had not killed anyone, the Crown alleged that Gardiner together with Mather and Aravena were aware of the plans to massacre the "no-surrender crew" beforehand and that by assisting the killers that the three was just as much guilty of first-degree murder as those who actually did the killing. "Constructive first-degree murder" is a difficult charge to prove in court, and a number of lawyers felt that Gardiner had a strong chance of acquittal. Many legal experts felt that the Crown Attorney prosecuting the case, Keven Gowdey, would have much difficulty in persuading the jury to convict the accused of "constructive first-degree murder".

== Trial ==
During the trial in 2009 in London, Ontario, a number of "ridiculous incidents" occurred. Gardiner handed Jane Sims, the crime correspondent of The London Free Press, a note reading: "My name is Brett Gardiner and I was wondering what had happen [sic] to the comic strip. I am currently residing at Elgin Middlesex detention center, so you have to understand that is [sic] gets boring and redundant in his [sic] place so please understand that the best part of my day is opening up the today [sic] section of your paper and reading your comic strips mostly the Deflocked strip. I love reading that [sic] stupid sheep and I keep all the one's [sic] that I get my hands on, but I know I have orderd [sic] your paper for one of those reasons. So please consider returning the comic's [sic] as they where [sic]. Sincerily [sic] Brett Gardiner". Gardiner appeared to be very upset when Sims told him that she was the crime correspondent with no editorial authority over the comic section of The London Free Press. Despite having only turned 25 that year, Gardiner was described as looking like a middle-aged man as the four years in jail had aged him badly. Gardiner's lawyer, Christopher Hicks, pursued the "cut-throat defense" of arguing that Gardiner did not know in advance of the plans for the massacre; had been a virtual prisoner on the night of the massacre; and had no choice, but comply out of the fear that he might be killed. Under the "cut-throat defense", Gardiners's actions were blamed on others, which was the antithesis of the ideals of biker "brotherhood" that he professed to hold sacred.

Hicks used his lengthy search for the "pickle tree" alleged to be growing on Kellestine's farm as evidence that his client had a very low IQ and was easily manipulated by those around him as his main defense argument. Gardiner was embarrassed by the "pickle tree" story recounted by Hicks, but recovered his composure as Hicks went over to the table to talk to his client. Gardiner seemed to have understood that Hicks was using the "stupidity defense" as his main argument as he contended that his client was not intelligent enough to be held responsible for his actions. Edwards wrote that the lawyers for each of the defendants competed to "...prove their clients were dumber, weaker and crazier than their old Bandidos brothers". When Sandham testified at the trial starting on 9 September 2009 and cast himself as the victim, portraying all of the others as bloodthirsty psychopaths with himself as an alleged heroic "undercover" policeman out to stop the Bandidos, Gardiner seemed extremely depressed. Gardiner had been loyal to Sandham and seemed very upset to learn that Sandham was not loyal to him in turn.

At one point, Hicks claimed his client was not even a member of the Bandidos, which led the Crown to introduce as evidence the poem Gardiner had written for his girlfriend at the time, Love Not Lost, that was signed in his handwriting "Prospect Bandido Bull Manitoba". Hicks claimed the poem was forged by persons unknown, but the Crown Attorney, Kevin Gowdey, noted it seemed unlikely that anyone would want to break into Kellestine's farmhouse just to plant a poem to frame Gardiner. Like the rest of the accused, Gardiner expressed much anger that he was charged with murder. He used the trial to make sexual advances at the courtroom sketch artist Karlene Ryan (cameras are not allowed in Canadian courtrooms). When Stephanie Salerno testified about her late husband, Francesco "Frank the Bammer" Salerno, "He became a much better man towards the end. He was a wonderful man...He was a terrific father", her words caused Ryan to break down in tears. Gardiner's "callous" response to Salerno's testimony was to pass a note to Ryan reading "Why aren't you smiling?", going on to suggest that they should be dating. Edwards, who covered the trial, described Gardiner as an immature man who seemed not to understand the "gravity" of the situation he was in. During the trial, Gardiner appeared very close to Mushey, who was the prisoner he talked to the most. Mushey delighted in humiliating Kellestine during the trial. Gardiner often joined with Mushey in laughter as Kellestine raged at Mushey for making him appear as a fool in the courtroom.

Hicks in his final address to the jury stated, "Kellestine is a psychopath, a psychotic killer. There are no kinder or gentler words which you can use. There are monsters among us and Kellestine is one...Gardiner was the lowest man on the totem pole, the last to know anything on the Bandido hierarchy". Hicks then repeated the story of Gardiner's quest for the elusive "pickle tree" as evidence that his client had an abysmally low IQ, saying: "It was the opinion of all observers that he [Gardiner] simply wasn't very bright". From his seat in the courtroom, Gardiner appeared to be humiliated by this defense. Shortly before the trial ended, Gardiner fired Hicks as his lawyer on 21 October 2009. Gardiner was apparently expecting a guilty verdict and thought that firing Hicks – who had tried to blame his actions on the others – would make him appear in prison as little of a "rat" as possible. Mushey also fired his lawyer, Michael Moon, at the same time, which led to speculation that Gardiner was following Mushey's lead.

In his final address to the jury, Gowdey argued to the jury that Gardiner was guilty of first-degree murder despite not killing anyone, as "People who intentionally help or encourage others to kill are as guilty as those who pull the trigger...This was a concerted effort by the shooters and their helpers; executioners and their henchmen...Together they advanced their Bandidos ambitions. Together, they faced trial...Everybody was a Bandido that night". Gowdey noted that the killers had armed themselves before the massacre, which strongly suggested the massacre was a premediated act. Gowdey further noted Gardiner had been assigned to clean the guns, which proved he was aware of what was being planned, and during the massacre, he had a telephone right next to him as the victims were shot while making no effort to contact the police. Gowdey concluded by arguing to the jury that Gardiner was just much guilty of first-degree murder as all of the others on the basis of his actions. On 29 October 2009, the jury convicted Gardiner of six counts of first-degree murder and two counts of manslaughter. Gardiner looked very unhappy as the verdict was announced. Gardiner is currently serving his sentence with no chance of parole at Stony Mountain Penitentiary in Manitoba.

== Books ==
- Arvast, Anita (2012). Bloody Justice The Truth Behind the Bandido Massacre at Shedden. Toronto: John Wiley & Sons. ISBN 9781118157459.
- Edwards, Peter (2010), The Bandido Massacre; A True Story of Bikers, Brotherhood and Betrayal, HarperCollins Publishers Ltd, ISBN 978-0307372765
- Langton, Jerry (2010), Showdown: How the Outlaws, Hells Angels and Cops Fought for Control of the Streets, John Wiley & Sons, ISBN 978-0470678787
