= Shedden massacre =

2006 motorcycle gang killing in Canada

- Location: Elgin County, Ontario, Canada
- Date: 8 April 2006
- Target: Bandidos No Surrender Crew Canada (NSCC)
- Attack type: Gang massacre
- Weapons: Handguns, shotguns, rifles
- Deaths: 8
- Injuries: 1
- Perpetrator: Bandidos Winnipeg chapter
- Convicted: 6 of first-degree murder

The Shedden massacre involved the gang-related killing of eight men, whose bodies were found in a field five kilometres north of Shedden, a small village in the Canadian province of Ontario, on April 8, 2006. Four vehicles, with the bodies inside, were first discovered by a farmer. The day after the bodies were discovered, five people, including one member of the Bandidos motorcycle gang, were arrested for the murders, and three more people were arrested in June 2006. The Ontario Provincial Police (OPP) said the killings were an isolated event and there were no fears for the safety of local residents. The name Shedden massacre is a misnomer. The killings took place at a farm outside of Iona Station and Shedden was the hamlet closest to where the bodies were discovered in a farmer's field.

== Background ==
=== "Patching over": consolidation in the outlaw biker world ===
Unable to stand on their own against the Hells Angels, the Chatham chapter of the Loners joined the Bandidos on 22 May 2001 as probationary members, becoming full members on 1 December 2001. Wayne Kellestine and Giovanni Muscedere were two of the Loners that joined the Bandidos. On 5 June 2002, after a series of police raids led to the arrest of several Bandidos in Ontario and Quebec, Giovanni Muscedere became the group's new president. After the arrests, the remaining Canadian Bandidos consisted of 15 members in Ontario spread over three chapters who were consolidated into a single chapter based in Toronto, although its members were actually scattered across southern Ontario. Muscedere became president as the only senior Bandido not in prison or facing charges.

=== The new chapter ===
In July 2004, Muscedere opened a new Bandido chapter in Winnipeg, whose members were only probationary members. The leader of the new chapter was Michael "Taz" Sandham, an ambitious former policeman who resigned rather than be fired for associating with outlaw bikers, and who worked hard to keep his past as a policeman secret.

In August 2004, after being released from prison following his conviction on gun and drug charges, Kellestine became the sargento de armas of the Canadian Bandidos, and was displeased at the way his former protégé Muscedere now overshadowed him. Journalist Peter Edwards wrote that outlaw biker clubs claim that they are all about freedom, but in reality they are rigid, rule-bound organizations run in a quasi-militaristic fashion with a strict hierarchy and rules governing every aspect of the members' existence. It was a great source of resentment that Kellestine now answered to president Muscedere, a man to whom he used to give orders when he was the Annihilators' president. When Sandham indicated he wanted to join the Bandidos, one of the Bandido leaders, Frank "Cisco" Lenti, was highly suspicious of him, saying he kept hearing rumours that Sandham used to be a policeman and that he had been rejected by the Outlaws for that reason. He assigned Kellestine to investigate him, and Kellestine reported that the rumours were not true, and that Sandham had never been a policeman.

On 25 June 2005, Sandham visited Kellestine's farm to complain about the unwillingness of the Toronto chapter to make the Winnipeg chapter full members, asking for his support. The principal reason why the Winnipeg chapter were not granted full patches was that the treasurer of the Toronto Bandidos, Luis "Chopper" Raposo, accused Sandham of not paying the monthly membership dues that were owed to Toronto, with Sandham insisting that he had paid the dues.

Edwards wrote that Sandham had "a talent for ruthless politicking and manipulation" as his goal was to take over the entire outlaw biker scene in all of Canada. Sandham had behaved in a very sycophantic manner towards Muscedere, Luis Raposo and Frank Salerno when he wanted to join the Bandidos in 2004, but turned on them when they stood in his ambitions' way. Sandham began writing emails to the Bandidos' mother chapter in Houston denouncing Muscedere's leadership and accusing Raposo of embezzlement.

=== Rift in the Bandidos: Houston vs. the "No Surrender Crew" ===
On 6 December 2005, drug dealer Shawn Douse was murdered. He had last been seen alive that day visiting the apartment of Bandido Jamie "Goldberg" Flanz in Keswick. Four Bandidos were charged with his murder. A Bandido, Cameron Acorn, was unhappy with Douse and decided to kill him for selling cocaine to Acorn's girlfriend's sister despite orders to stop, and possibly for sleeping with her. Douse was a worker at the Chrysler factory in Bramalea, a drug dealer and father of two. Flanz was only a "prospect" with the Bandidos. He agreed to let the full patch Bandidos use his apartment in the hope that he might become a full patch Bandido. Bandido Robert Quinn had his girlfriend call Douse from her cell phone, saying that she was at a party at Flanz's apartment and wanted to buy some cocaine right away. The all-white Bandidos hated Douse, who was of Black Jamaican descent, and Quinn's girlfriend later testified in court Douse was often described as a "nigger". Outlaw bikers are often white supremacists, and in some circles it is considered honourable for them to slay non-whites.

Douse arrived at Flanz's apartment by taxi. Acorn and his fellow Bandidos Pierre Aragon, Rudolph Brown, Paul Sinopoli, and Robert Quinn fell on Douse, stuffed a gag into his mouth and beat him to death. Douse screamed repeatedly as he was beaten to death in Flanz's basement, saying "I'm sorry", but no mercy was granted as he was considered to be just a "nigger" by the Bandidos. Later that night, Flanz came home from work as a bouncer at a bar. He was shocked to discover that his fellow Bandidos had killed Douse in his apartment, saying this was extremely "stupid" as Douse had arrived via taxi, meaning the police would connect the murder to him. However, Flanz was desperate to be promoted and become a "full patch" Bandido, and so declined to report the murder and helped clean up the crime scene. On 8 December 2005, Douse's burnt body was found. The Ontario Provincial Police (OPP) suspected Flanz had been involved in the murder and tapped his phone. As part of the investigation into Douse's death, the OPP ultimately brought not only Flanz, but the rest of the Toronto Bandido chapter under surveillance, tapping all of their phones.

On 28 December 2005, the American leadership of the Bandidos, which had grown increasingly unhappy with Muscedere's leadership, expelled him and his followers, charging that they were failing to make money, not paying their monthly membership dues because they did not have the money, and were going about business in a "sloppy" manner, leaving them wide open to prosecution. An officer with the Texas Department of Public Safety told the journalist Julien Sher of The Globe and Mail in 2006: "Because their numbers were so low in Canada, the U.S. Bandidos had tried to separate themselves from Canada. When you get to the point when you're not even breaking even – on drugs, like any other trade – you decide to close the business. If you're not bringing anything into the pot, you're a liability instead of an asset".

Muscedere took the expulsions very badly. After being ordered to return their Bandido patches and property, Muscedere sent out an email to Bandidos chapters around the world calling for a vote to allow him and his followers to stay. Jeff Pike, the world leader of the Bandidos, emailed Muscedere back that "Bandidos don't vote, they do what the fuck they're told".

Muscedere and his followers took to calling themselves the "no surrender crew", after an ultra-violent faction of the Irish Republican Army opposed to the Good Friday Agreement of 1998, because they refused the orders from the Bandidos' 'Mother chapter' in Houston to surrender their patches, saying they were going to stay on as Bandidos despite Pike's decision to expel them. Outlaw bikers attach enormous symbolic importance to their patches, which show which club they belong to and what their position is. The patches belong to the club, not to the men wearing them, and must be returned at once if a member is expelled or resigns. It is considered extremely offensive for someone to wear the patch of a club that they do not belong to, which often results in violence against anyone who does so.

Pike was greatly displeased by the refusal of the "no surrender crew" to return their patches, together with Muscedere's call for a vote to allow the Toronto chapter to stay, bluntly announcing the "Bandido Nation" was not a democracy. At the same time, Sandham was writing emails to Houston disavowing Muscedere and the rest of the "no surrender crew", proclaiming in highly obsequious language that he was with Houston against the "no surrender crew". Sandham had also told Kellestine at this time that the "no surrender crew" were planning to "patch over" to join the Outlaws without him. Kellestine believed what Sandham had told him, and this bit of misinformation turned Kellestine against the "no surrender crew".

=== The "farm crew" assembles ===
On 7 March 2006, Sandham, Kellestine and the younger Weiche travelled to British Columbia to visit the Peace Arch Park on the American-Canadian border. American bikers generally cannot enter Canada, as most of them have criminal records. The Peace Arch Park, where it is possible to hold a conversation without crossing the border, is a popular meeting place for Canadian and American bikers. An American Bandido, Peter "Mongo" Price, told Sandham and Kellestine that Houston was furious that the "no surrender crew" were still wearing Bandido patches despite being expelled in December 2005. Price was the national sergeant-at-arms of Bandidos USA, making him in charge of discipline, and accompanying him were Keinard "Hawaiian Ken" Post and Brian Bentley of the Washington state Bandidos. The fact that Price had flown from Houston to meet Kellestine and Sandham in the Peace Arch Park suggested he had something especially important to say, that he could not say on the phone or write in an email.

Price further informed Kellestine that he would become the new Canadian Bandido president if he succeeded in "pulling the patches" of the "no surrender crew", while the Winnipeg chapter would be granted "full patches", making them into full members. Price concluded by stating that both Kellestine and Sandham would be expelled as well if they failed with removing the patches being worn by the rogue Toronto chapter. At his trial in 2009, Sandham testified that Price who was representing Pike had told him that Muscedere and the rest of the "no surrender crew" were to be killed, and Kellestine would become the new leader of the Canadian Bandidos as the reward. After the meeting in the Peace Arch Park, Weiche chose to remain in Vancouver, though he regularly exchanged phone calls with Sandham. In his emails to his enemy Raposo after the meeting in the Peace Arch Park, Sandham adopted a mocking, condescending tone of superiority, as he was secure in the knowledge that Houston was on his side. Between 20 and 22 March, Sandham again went to Vancouver to meet with American Bandidos in the Peace Arch Park. The Winnipeg crew claimed that Sandham received a phone call from an American Bandido, Keinard "Hawaiian Ken" Post, asking why the "no surrender crew" were still wearing Bandido patches five months after being expelled and accused them all of incompetence in allowing this situation to persist.

On 25 March 2006, Sandham announced to his followers that he had received orders from Houston to act against the "no surrender crew", so they were departing for Kellestine's farm without telling him that they were coming. Sandham assured his followers that Kellestine had plenty of guns at his farm, but he brought along a bullet-proof vest and a box of surgical gloves, saying he needed them to leave no fingerprints on the guns that Kellestine would provide. While stopping in Dryden in northern Ontario, Sandham received a phone call from his common-law wife Kathleen saying that Pierre "Carlitto" Aragon had arrived in Winnipeg and was looking for him. Aragon had apparently been dispatched by Muscedere and Salerno to kill Sandham, who was seen as the source of their problems with Houston. When Sandham arrived at Kellestine's farm, he lied to him by claiming not to know why he had been sent there, and told Kellestine that he would receive further orders from Houston. Kellestine was surprised by Sandham's visit, but he quickly took charge of his guests and provided them with weapons from his hidden cache of arms he kept at his farm. Despite two lifetime bans on possessing weapons, the self-proclaimed "gun nut" Kellestine continued to collect guns and had a large collection of guns and ammunition. Kellestine also produced what he called his "wet work kit" for cleaning up after murders of hydrochloric acid and rubber gloves, saying he always used his "wet work kit" after he killed somebody.

Arriving to help Kellestine with "pulling the patches" were Sandham together with three other Winnipeg Bandidos, namely Dwight "Big Dee" Mushey; Marcello "Fat Ass" Aravena; a former iron-worker from Calgary named Brett "Bull" Gardiner, whom Mushey had recruited into the Bandidos; and another man known only as M.H.

Joining them was a man that Kellestine had recruited, a career criminal from New Brunswick with a long record for home invasions, Frank Mather, who was serving as his bodyguard. During the trial in 2009, the Crown Attorney prosecuting the case, Kevin Gowdey, took to referring to the men gathered at Kellestine's farm as the "farm crew" and it is by that name that they are known. Kellestine treated the junior Bandidos like Aravena and Gardiner like slaves, expecting them to do all of his housework for them. Gardiner was a man of very limited intelligence, whom Kellestine had once asked to supply him with pickles from a "pickle tree" growing on his farm, which led him to spend hours looking for the elusive "pickle tree" before telling Kellestine that he couldn't find it.

At the beginning of April 2006, Kellestine accused one of the "no surrender crew", Flanz, of being a police informer. As Flanz was Jewish and the rabidly anti-Semitic Kellestine hated him for that, Muscedere did not take the allegation seriously, but to settle the matter, it was agreed that the "no surrender crew" would visit Kellestine's farm to discuss his claims. Most of the "no surrender crew" lived in the Toronto area, but Kellestine insisted that the meeting be held at his farm, and Muscedere agreed. Kellestine also stated that Sandham and some other members of the Winnipeg chapter were staying with him, which was intended as a "bait" as he knew that relations between Muscedere and Sandham were very poor. Muscedere and the "no surrender crew" were planning to "pull the patch" on Kellestine, whose racist paranoia had become too much for them.

On the night before the massacre, Kellestine had his common-law wife, Tina Fitzgerald, and his daughter together with Mather's girlfriend leave his farm, saying no women could be present at the "church" meeting (in outlaw biker slang a "church" meeting is a mandatory meeting for the chapter). Despite the rules forbidding bringing guns to "church" meetings, Raposo brought a sawed-off shotgun with him to the meeting as he knew that his enemy Sandham was going to be present. Muscedere believed that nothing would happen to him at the "church" meeting, seeing his enemy only as Sandham and believed that his "brother" Kellestine would never betray him. Unknown to the "no surrender crew", a team of detectives investigating Douse's murder followed them down the 401 highway as they went to meet Kellestine at his farm at 32196 Aberdeen Line. During the trip to Kellestine's farm, Acorn called Raposo on his cell phone from the prison phone, to tell him "I love you bro" over and over again, and did not mention his call with Kellestine. During his call, Acorn also spoke with Muscedere and Edwards wrote: "Faced with the chance to alert Boxer and Chopper as they drove to Kellestine's farm, Acorn said nothing, betraying his president with his silence on the night of his murder". The policemen following the "no surrender crew" had no warrant to enter Kellestine's farm, and as he had chopped down most of the trees on the flat land around his farm to provide a wide open view in all directions, the police decided not to compromise the operation by getting too close, parking their cars several miles away in a wooded country lane.

== The massacre ==
=== The arrival of the "no-surrender crew" ===
On the night of April 7, 2006, a meeting at Kellestine's farm attended by the two factions began at about 10:30 PM, when the "no surrender crew" entered his barn. The barn was full of rusting machinery, old furniture, and children's toys while its walls were decorated with pornographic photographs of buxom young women sitting atop Harley-Davidson motorcycles or half-dressed as construction workers together with "Kellestine's usual Nazi propaganda". Kellestine instructed his guests to stay in the middle where he had cleared out some space. Sandham was standing in the rafters with a rifle while Mushey, Mather, Aravena and MH were patrolling outside armed with rifles and shotguns, and Gardiner listened to the police scanners inside Kellestine's house. According to one version of the events, upon entering the barn, Luis "Chopper" Raposo saw Sandham with his rifle, and realizing that he had been betrayed fired at him with his sawed-off shotgun. Sandham was only slightly injured as he was wearing a bullet-proof vest, returned fire and killed Raposo. However, Raposo's favourite gesture was to "give the finger", and the autopsy revealed at the time of his death, Raposo had raised his middle finger while the rest of his fingers clenched into his fist and that Sandham's bullet had gone through Raposo's raised finger, shattering it completely. The forensic evidence does not support Sandham's claim that Raposo had fired at him, and moreover Sandham is a "well known pathological liar" not known for his willingness to take responsibility for his actions. It is not entirely clear what happened other than Raposo was giving Sandham the finger at the time when Sandham used his skills as a marksman to put a bullet through it. Two of the "no surrender crew", Paul "Big Paulie" Sinopoli and George "Crash" Kriarakis attempted to flee, but were shot down and wounded by Kellestine who was armed with a handgun. Kellestine shouted: "Everybody get on the floor! Nobody move! I'm here to pull your patches. This is being done by the orders of the States [the U.S leadership of the Bandidos]".

=== The last hours of the "no-surrender crew" ===
Over the next two hours, Kellestine frequently changed his mind about whether he was going to "pull the patches" or execute the "no surrender crew", and at one point allowed Muscedere to call his girlfriend, Nina Lee, on his cell phone provided he "didn't say anything fucking stupid". Muscedere told Lee: "How's the baby? I'll see you in a couple hours. I love you." The macho Muscedere opted to be faithful to the outlaw biker's code of never asking for help, and did not alert Lee to his predicament, instead asking about how their daughter Angelina was doing. Kellestine drank heavily over the course of the night and ranted to his prisoners about his grievances with them. Kellestine pistol-whipped Flanz several times and told him: "I'm saving you for last, you fucking Jew!" Kriarakis, who was wounded in the thigh, prayed to God and asked that his captors spare him as his family would miss him and he had a wife he loved back at home, but was told to shut up. As Kriarakis prayed in Greek while Sinopoli cried, saying he never wanted to come to Kellestine's farm, which led to both men being told by another prisoner, Francesco "Frank the Bammer" Salerno: "We're bikers. We're not the fucking Boy Scouts, so stop your whining". Several times, Kellestine asked Muscedere to join him despite the way he was attempting to depose him as national president, but he firmly declined, instead asking that an ambulance be called for Sinopoli and Kriarakis, who were bleeding to death. Muscedere also defended Flanz against charges of being disloyal; Kellestine was an admirer of Nazi Germany and had issues with the Jewish Flanz. Finally, Kellestine decided to execute the "No Surrender crew" and they were all taken out one by one and shot execution-style, in what the Ontario Court of Appeal described as "an execution assembly line". At about midnight, Constable Perry Graham of the OPP doing his nightly patrol around the countryside in his cruiser, ran into the surveillance team, sitting in the wooded lane in the dark, to ask them what they were doing, and learned that they were investigating the murder of Douse. At about 12:30 am, the surveillance team went home, having noticed nothing.

As the men were marched out and shot, Kellestine, who was drinking very heavily that night, danced a jig while singing Das Deutschlandlied. Between dancing his jig while singing the anthem and executing his prisoners, Kellestine would go over to torment Flanz. Realizing he was doomed, Muscedere stated: "Do me. Do me first. I want to go out like a man." A police wiretap recorded that Mushey told Aravena about Muscedere's execution: "This guy, he went out like a man...He laughed. Went like a man." Kellestine personally executed Muscedere, who had once been his friend. Muscedere was marched out of the barn, forced to sit in his car, and then shot in the head at point-blank range, followed by another shot to his chest. The next to be killed was Kriarakis, who prayed in Greek, as he went out and was shot. Mushey speaking to M.H some weeks later and unaware that the latter was wearing a wire, said he was surprised by how much Kriarakis cried as he was marched out to be shot, saying he expected a fellow outlaw biker to be tougher. George "Pony" Jessome, went out next, not saying a word. Sinopoli was taken to be shot, crying and screaming hysterically, saying that he had really wished that he had not attended this meeting as he had wanted to. Sinopoli was shot but survived while Kellestine's gun jammed. Aravena then had to fetch Kellestine another gun, which he then used to finish off Sinopoli who had been left bleeding and in great pain in the interval. Flanz and another of the "no surrender crew", Michael "Little Mickey" Trotta were ordered to clean up the blood on the ground, using bleach. At this point, Kellestine began to rant about how he was such a hard worker who was doing such a great job killing the "no surrender crew", who were not thankful for his hard work, as if he expected them to appreciate his work in killing them. As Kellestine went in and out of his barn with prisoners to kill, none of his colleagues, the majority of whom had guns made any effort to free the prisoners or to shoot Kellestine, though they were all to claim at the trial that they wanted to stop Kellestine. Even those who did not have guns like Gardiner could have called the police as all of the "farm crew" had cell phones with them or access to a phone, but none did. Gardiner had a telephone right next to him as he listened to the police scanners, but he never called the police as he wanted to be a full patch Bandido.

One of the killers who later turned Crown's evidence, known as only as "MH", stated one of the victims, Frank "Bammer" Salerno, tried to shake his hand with MH testifying in 2009: "Bammer went to shake my hand. I didn't do it. Dwight did." Salerno also tried to shake Aravena's hand, but he declined, saying: "I'm not shaking your hand". As Salerno was marched out to be shot, his last words to his killers were to think of his newly born son, Mario. Flanz was shot last in order to ensure that he would suffer the most because he was Jewish, and he talked much about his children as he waited for his time to die. Trotta was taken out to be shot, not saying a word, and finally Flanz was killed. Gardiner removed the children's toys from the back of Trotta's Grand Prix to make room for Flanz while M.H, Aravena, Mushey, and Mather watched. By this point, Kellestine was too drunk to kill Flanz, and instead Sandham shot him in the head. Sandham was too nervous to aim properly despite shooting at point-blank range, and Flanz was still alive after Sandham had shot him. As Flanz looked up with a sad expression, as if begging with his eyes to save his life, Sandham could not bring himself to kill him, claiming his gun was jammed. Finally, Mushey, who was a more experienced killer than Sandham, took his gun and proved it was not jammed by finishing off Flanz with another shot to the head.

=== Disposing of the bodies ===
Afterwards, Kellestine ordered the bodies be placed into their vehicles. Nobody wanted to drive Muscedere's car with his body in the driver's seat and the entire front seats soaked in blood, so his car was attached to Jessome's tow truck. Sinopoli's obese corpse did not fit properly into the trunk of the SUV that it was packed into with the other corpses, and nearly rolled out several times during the trip up the 401 highway. Mushey who drove Trotta's Pontiac Grand Prix, complained his car was full of toys belonging to his daughter, which had to be cleared away to make room for the corpses. Kellestine had planned to take the bodies up the 401 and dump them in Kitchener, which was known as a stronghold of the Hells Angels, out of the belief the police would blame them, but he did not buy enough gas for the trip, forcing the killers to abort the trip to Kitchener, with the bodies dumped in a farmer's field chosen at random only because they couldn't go any further up the 401. Mather who was driving Flanz's Infiniti reported the vehicle was almost out of gas, and turned into a farmer's field where the Stafford Line met the 401 highway. The bodies and vehicles dumped in the farmer's field were not burned because the killers were "too cheap to buy enough gasoline" to set them afire. Kellestine who remained at his farm was surprised when the "farm crew" returned after about half an hour, asking: "How fucking far did you guys go? I thought I told you to take them all the way to Kitchener". Afterwards, the "farm crew" went to work destroying the evidence, burning some of the items that belonged to the victims while keeping some for themselves. Edwards stated: "I don't think Kellestine would've been that dangerous that night if it wasn't for Sandham, the cop. They needed Sandham's ambition, and Kellestine's craziness."

== Investigation ==
=== Discovery of the corpses ===
At about 7:45 am on 8 April 2006, a farmer, Russell Steele and his wife Mary, received a phone call from another farmer, Forbes Oldham, saying that there were vehicles parked in their cornfield. The Steeles went to investigate and upon seeing the corpses, called the police. Muscedere's girlfriend, Nina Lee, called Kellestine at about 8:00 am to ask where her boyfriend was, and he told her that he had just left. Both Aravena and Gardiner were promoted up the Bandido ranks, and Gardiner chose to stay with Kellestine at his farm. Sandham and the rest of the Winnipeg Bandidos left Kellestine's farm later that morning. The road trip back to Winnipeg was unhappy one with Mushey calling Sandham a "pussy" for being unable to finish off Flanz, Aravena kept seeking assurances from Mushey that he would not kill him, Sandham being more pompous and conceited than ever and M.H. already considering turning Crown's evidence. The security cameras at a Walmart in Barrie showed that between 10:21 and 10:53 am, the Winnipeg Bandidos were in the store with M.H. later testifying that Mushey told the other Bandidos that they should buy some Head and Shoulders shampoo, which he assured them was the best shampoo for removing gunpowder residue. As the victims had last been seen alive entering Kellestine's farm and the bodies were found close to his farm, he was considered to be a prime suspect right from the start. The same day the bodies were found, Detective Inspector Paul Beesley of the OPP, who was in charge of the investigation, had asked a judge for a search warrant for Kellestine's farm. At about 3:05 pm, two of Kellestine's friends, Kerry Morris and Eric Niessen, arrived at his farm to help him destroy the evidence and to discuss the alibi they were planning on giving him. The alibi was that Niessen and Morris had spent the night of 7 April drinking beer with Kellestine at his farmhouse and that was all that happened there that night. The police had stationed cars on the Aberdeen Line and observed Morris and Niessen helping Kellestine clean his barn.

=== Kellestine arrested ===
The discovery of the bodies caused a media frenzy and the Toronto media blamed the Hells Angels at once. Edwards stated: "Right after the killings, I phoned a Hells Angel member and said 'Don't you guys have anything to do with this?' and he said 'What could we take from them? They don't have two nickels to rub together.' And it turned out that was true; they really didn't have anything to steal, and so there was no point to that. I talked to another Hells Angel and he said 'It's a great day when you wake up and your enemies have killed each other.'" Around the world, the massacre attracted attention, making the front pages of The Times of London, The Sydney Morning Herald of Sydney, The Irish Examiner of Cork, and The People's Daily of Beijing while both CNN and Fox News sent news teams to Shedden to cover what the media took to referring to as the "Shedden massacre". The phrase "Shedden massacre" caused much chagrin to the residents of Shedden who complained their hamlet had nothing to do with the massacre. On the Bandidos website in Houston, no message of condolence was posted and messages of condolences that were left by visitors were promptly deleted. Upon returning to Winnipeg, Sandham, who as ambitious as ever, started sending emails to Houston denigrating Kellestine for behaving in uncontrolled or unexpected ways, and demanded he be made Bandido national president instead. In a typical email, full of gushing praise for the "Bandido way", Sandham wrote: "This Brotherhood means everything to me and to wear the best colours is [in] the world is a great honour for me". In the meantime, Kellestine was arrested and charged with first-degree murder on the evening of 9 April 2006. Because Niessen and Morris gave Kellestine an alibi, saying they were at his farm on the night of killings, they were also charged with first-degree murder, much to their own shock as they never expected that lying to the police would have such consequences. When the couple were arrested for murder, Morris screamed "What!" over and over again. Mather and Gardiner were also arrested with Kellestine and charged with first degree murder. Searching Kellestine's farm, the police found evidence that guns had recently been cut down at a vise in his workshop, but found no murder weapons, which caused Beesley much concern.

=== Sandham investigated ===
The Winnipeg police started following Sandham after his return, and on the afternoon of 10 April 2006, Constable Grant Goulet observed Sandham taking his Blazer to a car wash to have the interior of his vehicle cleaned. On 14 April 2006, M.H. met with Constable Timothy Diack, who told him the police knew he was involved in the massacre and he could either turn Crown's evidence or go to prison for the rest of his life. On 15 April, Sandham was observed having the tires of his vehicle removed with Sandham dumping his old tires on the side of a remote country road. An examination revealed the tires that Sandham had just abandoned in the countryside matched the tire prints found on Kellestine's farm. The next day, M.H. met with Diack, where he demanded $750,000 and immunity for testifying against the others. Eventually, it was agreed that M.H would receive total immunity, $1,300/per month for the rest of his life, and free rent in exchange for which he would wear a wire and turn Crown's evidence. M.H. wore a wire starting from early May 2006 at his meetings with Mushey and Aravena, the latter greatly pleased at becoming a Bandido prospect, which allowed him to wear the Bandido patch. However, the "Fat Mexican" that Aravena wore had been sewed by his mother rather than supplied by Houston.

=== Finding the evidence ===
A massive forensic investigation had begun on the Kellestine farm, and by May the police had found in the fireplace the charred keys to the houses and apartments of the "Shedden Eight" murder victims, and a partially burned business card reading ONICO, the name of Flanz's computer company. On 24 May 2006, Constable Al Dubro discovered under Kellestine's micro-wave a secret doorway, where the police found Kellestine's gun cache. Dubro called Beesley, who found 18 guns in Kellestine's gun cache. Ballistic tests showed some of the guns found in Kellestine's cache were the murder weapons. On one of the handguns, a Mossberg, was found microscopic traces of blood, which DNA testing showed came from Flanz, Kriarakis, Sinopoli, Jessome and Salerno while on another handgun, a Hi-Point .380, had microscopic blood traces from Trotta and Sinopoli. The floor of Kellestine's barn was found to be soaked in hydrochloric acid from Kellestine's "wet work kit". Inside Kellestine's farmhouse, the police found a ring that had skin flakes embedded in it; DNA testing showed that the skin came from Flanz. The police also found a baseball cap in the farmhouse that had a hair in it and which DNA testing revealed to be from Kriarakis. As an undercover agent, M.H. began to speak with Mushey and Aravena about the massacre while wearing a wire, and found it easy to get Mushey to start talking by telling him that Sandham was boasting about killing 3 of the 8 men in underworld circles, which led Mushey to say that Sandham had killed only Raposo and botched the killing of Flanz.

=== Sandham expelled ===
Sandham became involved in a feud with Pierre Aragon over who had the right to be the Bandidos national president. The feud ended with Sandham being expelled from the Bandidos on 6 June 2006. At the same time, "Mary Thompson", who was filled with guilt for not doing anything to save Douse's life, told the OPP the truth about the murder of Douse, and Brown, Quinn, Acorn, and Aragon were all arrested for his murder in June 2006. Acorn was in the Penetanguishene prison and Brown was in the Lindsay jail awaiting charges for other offences at the time of their arrests, Aragon was arrested on the street on Kipling Avenue in Toronto on 21 June and Quinn was arrested on 26 June in Nelson, British Columbia.

== Legal proceedings ==
=== Alibis abandoned ===
Eric Niessen, 45, and his common-law wife Kerry Morris, 47, both from Monkton, Ontario, were initially charged with first degree murder, but police dropped those charges on May 6, and they were instead charged with eight counts of being accessories after the fact. Facing first-degree murder charges, Niessen and Morris abandoned the alibi they had given Kellestine, stating that they were not present at his farm on the night of the murders as they had no desire to go to prison for the rest of their lives. Both Niessen and Morris pleaded guilty to obstructing justice on 15 October 2007, admitting they had given Kellestine a false alibi and helped him destroy evidence, being sentenced to two years in prison. Morris complained afterwards to the media: "It's been horrible, Absolutely horrible. My life's been destroyed...Friends, they've just turned their backs". Kellestine and the other four suspects were all arrested at his residence, only a few kilometres from the crime scene. The surrounding Elgin County has a history of biker gang activity, though not of major crime.

=== Arrests in Winnipeg ===
On June 16, 2006, police in Winnipeg arrested three additional men, all from that city, in connection with the killings:

- Dwight Mushey, 36
- Marcello Aravena, 30
- Michael Sandham, 36

The three were delivered into OPP custody and transported to St. Thomas, Ontario for a court appearance that afternoon. All were charged with eight counts of first-degree murder. A woman, whom police refused to identify, was also arrested but was not charged. Police also seized an SUV for forensic testing in Ontario. After his arrest, Sandham denied 223 times to OPP Sergeant Mick Bickerton who was questioning him that he was involved in the massacre, claiming he was not even in Ontario at the time of the killings, instead maintaining that he was raking leaves in front of his Winnipeg home on the weekend of the massacre, even though there are no trees on the street that Sandham lived on. Sandham also denied to Bickerton that he was a member of the Bandidos, saying he had left the club in 2005.

=== Preliminary hearings ===
On January 9, 2007, a preliminary hearing for all six suspects began in a court in London, Ontario, under extremely tight security. On the first day of the proceeding, Kellestine gave reporters the finger and swore at a courtroom artist. A gag order was issued prohibiting media reports on the evidence presented in the hearing. The hearing was expected to take about three months, but did not conclude until June 21, 2007, at which time Justice Ross Webster ruled that all six defendants would stand trial on all charges. At the time, defence lawyers for at least two of the suspects said that the evidence presented warranted a reduction in charges for their clients. The lawyers were considering asking for a review of Webster's ruling by a higher court, which could delay the case by several months.

On 3 July 2007, the preliminary inquiry into Douse's death began with "Mary Thompson" testifying that the accused had beaten Douse to death in Flanz's apartment on 6 December 2005. The accused took to laughing and snickering when "Mary Thompson" mentioned that their favourite term for Douse was "nigger", which clearly pained Douse's parents and sister who were also attending the preliminary inquiry. Edwards who attended the preliminary hearing noted that the accused clearly relished their role as "racist thugs". Edwards wrote: "Boxer Muscedere and Ripper Fullager would have been mortified by how the accused men were representing their club. For all of their faults, Boxer and Ripper weren't racists, nor were they bullies towards women". After the preliminary inquiry ended with the judge ruling the case would go to trial, "Mary Thompson" apologized in person to the Douse family for not stepping forward and for her own use of the term "nigger" for Shawn Douse. Shawn Douse's father, John Douse, told "Mary Thompson": "Why are you sorry? You helped us. You are the star witness. Without you, there would be no case". The charges relating to Douse's death ended on 7 January 2008 with the four Bandidos charged all pleading guilty. Rudolph Brown pleaded guilty to second-degree murder, Robert Quinn and Cameron Acorn to manslaughter and Pierre Aragon to aggravated assault. Justice Edwin Minden called the killing of Douse "a vicious, senseless, callous and cowardly killing", saying the defendants should count themselves lucky for receiving such light sentences.

=== The trial begins ===
The murder trial for Aravena, Gardiner, Kellestine, Mather, Mushey and Sandham commenced on March 31, 2009, in London, Ontario, with all six of the accused entering pleas of not guilty. The senior Crown Attorney (prosecutor) on the case was Kevin Gowdey assisted by junior Crown Attorneys Fraser Kelly, Tim Zuber, David D'Iorio and Meredith Gardiner. Kellestine was defended by Clay Powell, a Toronto lawyer best known for defending Keith Richards of the Rolling Stones after he was arrested for heroin possession in Toronto in 1977 while Sandham was defended by Don Crawford, a lawyer used to defending "ambitious dimwits." Assisting Crawford was Gordon Cudmore and assisting Powell was Ken McMillian.

During the trial, Powell and McMillian portrayed Sandham as a cold-blooded, ruthless schemer who manipulated Kellestine into committing the murders; Crawford and Cudmore portrayed Kellestine as a bloodthirsty, deranged psychopath who pressured Sandham into committing the massacre; and the lawyers for the rest blamed both Sandham and Kellestine for their actions of their clients. Gardiner's lawyer, Christopher Hicks, used his lengthy search for the "pickle tree" alleged to be growing on Kellestine's farm as evidence that his client had a very low IQ and was easily manipulated by those around him as his main defence argument. Edwards wrote that the lawyers for each of the men competed to "...prove their clients were dumber, weaker and crazier than their old Bandidos brothers".

=== Sandham on the stand ===
Only two of the defendants took the stand to testify in their defence. Sandham spent most of his time on the stand crying that it was "unfair" that he should be charged with first-degree murder for his part in the massacre. Sandham delivered what Edwards called "a lie-filled fusion of self-pity and selfless heroism" starting on 9 September 2009.

=== Aravena on the stand ===
After Sandham's testimony on the stand, widely viewed as a "train-wreck" that did himself much damage, Aravena took the stand on 22 September 2009. Aravena testified that he was of low intelligence, but the Crown Attorney cross-examining him forced to concede on the stand that he could have sought help had he so desired.

=== M.H. on the stand ===
The star witness known as "MH" testified to a bungled and 'cheap' plot, led by an indecisive Kellestine. MH, one of the killers agreed to turn Crown's evidence in exchange for being granted immunity.

=== Final submissions ===
In his final address to the jury, Gowdey admitted that M.H was far from being a model citizen, but that the forensic evidence supported his testimony. Gowdey argued though Mather, Aravena, and Gardiner had not killed anyone, they were still guilty of first degree murder as there had been a plan to murder the "no surrender crew", which they were a part of, and that by guarding the prisoners, Mather, Aravena and Gardiner had facilitated the killings, making them just as guilty as Kellestine, Sandham and Mushey. Gowdey stated: "People who intentionally help or encourage others to kill are as guilty as those who pull the trigger". Gowdey argued that a first degree murder conviction was warranted as there was premeditation to the killings, noting the killers had armed themselves beforehand, were wearing rubber gloves and in the case of Sandham was wearing his "ratty" bullet proof vest, saying: "If this wasn't a plan, this is amazing luck...It has plan and ambush written all over it".

=== Verdicts ===
On October 29, 2009, the jury returned 44 guilty verdicts for first degree murder and four for manslaughter, believed to be the largest number of murder convictions ever produced from a single criminal proceeding in Canada.

Wayne Kellestine, Michael Sandham and Dwight Mushey were each found guilty of eight counts of first-degree murder. Frank Mather and Marcelo Aravena were both found guilty of seven counts of first degree murder and one count of manslaughter. Brett Gardiner was found guilty of six counts of first degree murder and two counts of manslaughter.

Addressing the court, Kriarakis's mother Vickie Kriarakis stated: "I miss George...I wake up in the middle of the night and I feel the terror in his eyes". Muscedere's daughter, Teresa, told the court she missed her father intensely and her daughter would never know her grandfather. Teresa Muscedere further noted her father had helped Kellestine with paying his mortgage because he wanted to help his friend, and was rewarded with being murdered by him.

Aravena, Gardiner, Kellestine, Mather, Mushey and Sandham appealed their convictions; but Sandham ultimately abandoned his appeal. On April 16, 2015, the Ontario Court of Appeal dismissed the remaining appeals.

Gardiner, Mather and Aravena then sought leave to make their final appeals to the Supreme Court of Canada. On April 7, 2016, the Supreme Court of Canada dismissed their applications for leave to appeal.

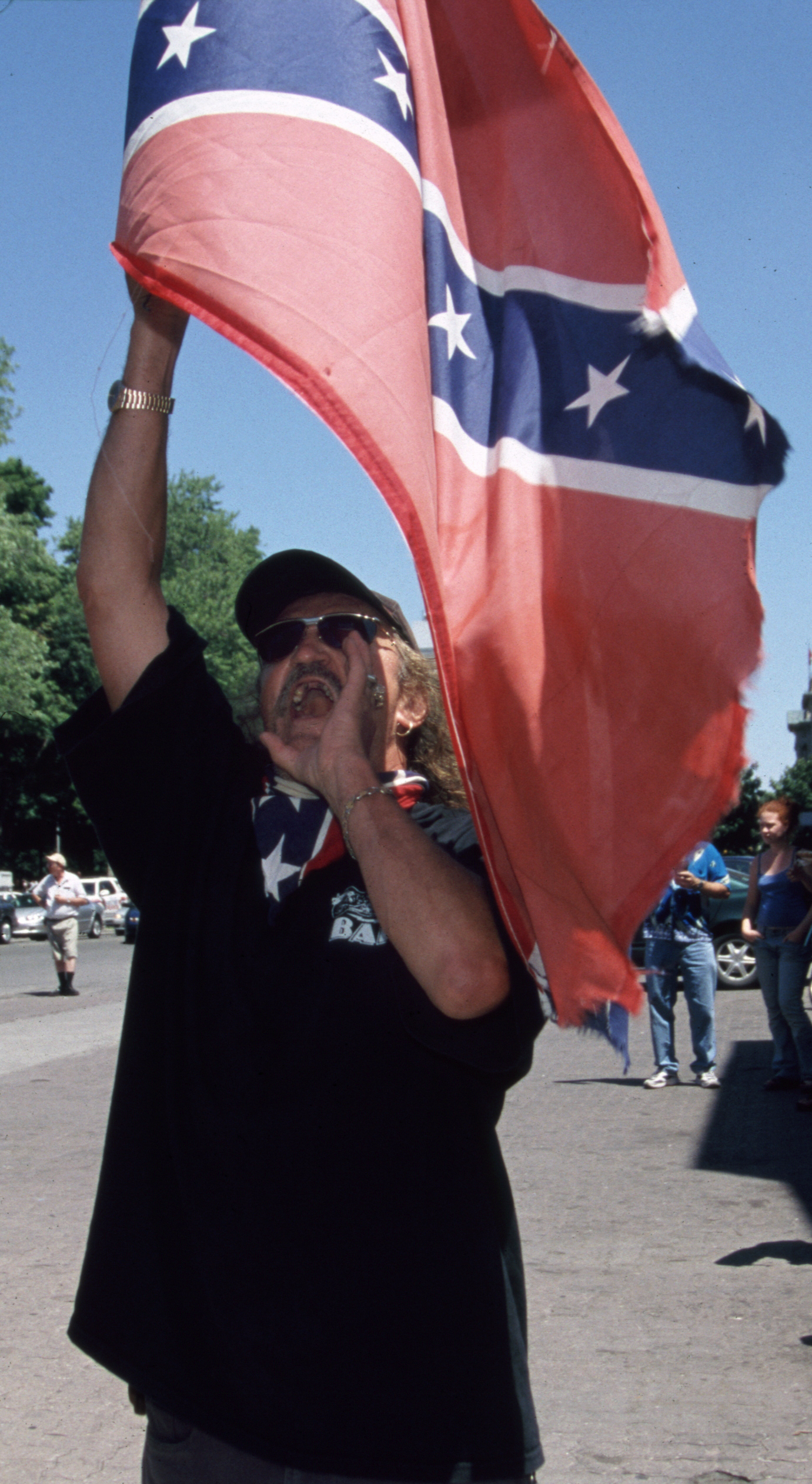
Wayne Kellestine, Bandidos member, was convicted in connection with the Shedden massacre.

== Legacy ==
Referring to the massacre, Yves Lavigne, an expert on outlaw bikers in Canada, told The London Free Press in 2016 that: "Bikers are not the smartest people. Or wannabes...It's like the NHL. They expanded too fast and too much. Now they're just recruiting anyone. How can they call themselves a "motorcycle club" when some recruits don't even know how to ride a motorbike? You don't romanticize these people ... These guys [the killers and the victims] were all rejects from other gangs. These guys were the class dummies. So the lesson in Shedden is: Don't try to be something you're not". Lavigne concluded that the Shedden massacre was amateurish killings of men of low intelligence perpetrated by men of low intelligence. The former Bandido Edward Winterhalder told Edwards in 2016: "It's meth logic. That's all that was. It was logical in (Kellestine's) mind because he was whacked out on methamphetamine." As the result of the massacre with the Toronto chapter of the Bandidos all killed and the Winnipeg chapter all imprisoned was the end of the Bandidos in Canada, leaving the Hell's Angels as the dominant outlaw biker gang in Canada. Edwards stated: "In Ontario, you had the Hells Angels and the people the Hells Angels let exist. They either worked with you or they didn't care about you".

== See also ==
- Lennoxville massacre
