= George Jessome =

Canadian outlaw biker (1953–2006)

- Born: 1953; Newfoundland and Labrador, Canada
- Died: 7 April 2006 (aged 52–53); Elgin County, Ontario, Canada
- Other name: "Pony"
- Occupations: Outlaw biker; tow-truck driver
- Known for: Victim of the Shedden massacre
- Allegiance: Bandidos MC

George Jessome (1953 – 7 April 2006), better known as "Pony", was a Canadian outlaw biker and gangster, known as one of the victims of the Shedden massacre of 2006.

== Bandidos ==
Jessome was born in Newfoundland and worked as a tow truck driver in Toronto. Jessome's family did not follow him to Ontario. Jessome lived alone in a trailer at his employer's yard, Superior Towing. In 2005, he joined the Bandidos motorcycle gang. Jessome was a close friend of another tow truck driver, George "Crash" Kriarakis, who recruited him into the Bandidos. In common with many of the members of the Canadian Bandidos, a self-proclaimed "motorcycle club", Jessome did not own a motorcycle nor know how to ride one. Unlike many of the other Bandidos, Jessome was not interested in organized crime. He had a terminal case of cancer and only joined the Bandidos to provide him with friends in his last days.

Jessome seems not to have been a successful gangster. The Bandidos had a joint cellphone with Telus and club records showed that Jessome was $136.66 in arrears on the phone plan. Jessome was once cut off midway during a phone conversation due to his inability to pay for cellphone usage. Peter Edwards, the crime correspondent of The Toronto Star, wrote Jessome was "laid-back and easy-going" man who spoke with "a high-pitched, screechy Maritime accent". Jessome liked to abuse alcohol and cocaine, but was considered to be non-threatening by those who knew him. Jessome was very close to James "Ripper" Fullaer, the mentor to the Toronto Bandido chapter who also dying of cancer, and spent much time comforting him in the hospital. Jessome was a pseudo-gangster who was not actually making any money from the Bandidos as he instead had to work 12 hour days to make his living.

=== Shedden massacre ===
At the beginning of April 2006, Wayne "Wiener" Kellestine, the Toronto's sergeant-at-arms, accused one of the Toronto chapter, Jamie "Goldberg" Flanz, of being a police informer. The Bandidos national president Giovanni "Boxer" Muscedere agreed that a meeting would be held at Kellestine's farmhouse to discuss the allegations. On night of 7 April 2006, Jessome made the trip to Kellestine's farm.

Upon entering the barn, one of the Toronto chapter, Luis "Chopper" Raposo, was shot and killed by Michael "Taz" Sandham of the Winnipeg chapter. Kellestine fired his gun in the air and shouted: "Everybody get on the floor! Nobody move! I'm here to pull your patches. This is being done by the orders of the States [the U.S leadership of the Bandidos]".

One by one, Kellestine had successive members of the Toronto chapter marched out of the barn to be executed. Kellestine then decided to execute Jessome. Kellstine told Jessome "Let's go" and Jessome walked quietly behind him. The fact that Jessome was already dying of cancer seems to have made him resigned to his fate. Together with the Winnipeg chapter's sergeant-at-arms, a man known as M.H. due to a court order, as he later turned Crown's evidence, Kellestine marched Jessome out of the barn. Kellestine and M.H. ordered Jessome to sit in the rear seat of his tow truck. After Jessome sat down, Kellestine shot Jessome in the head and then lifted his shirt to shoot him in the chest. Kellestine then ordered M.H. to push his body further in and close the door to his tow truck. As no-one wanted to drive the car of Muscedere with his bloody corpse in the front seat, his car was attached to Jessome's tow truck. The autopsy revealed that Jessome had been abusing the painkiller drug oxycodone, which he had massive amounts of in his blood.

At the trial of his killers in 2009, Jessome's son, Richard, resembled his father, which caused Kellestine to be shocked in the courtroom when he first saw him as if he had seen a ghost. Kellestine then started to smirk and making threatening gestures at Richard Jessome, which led the younger Jessome to say: "I felt like I was disrespected and that he wanted to harm me. And I felt very angry and sad all at the same time". Jessome wrote a letter to his father's killers that read: "Don't play stupid. All of you were in it together".

In his 2009 book The Fat Mexican, the private detective Alex Caine alleged Jamie Flanz was driving Jessome's tow truck and had stolen a massive quantity of cocaine from the Hells Angels. In turn, Caine alleged that there was a conspiracy involving both the American leaders of both the Hells Angels and Bandidos that led to the Shedden massacre. Caine's conspiracy theory has been widely dismissed as the journalist Bruce Owen noted that Caine made "unsupported theories" in The Fat Mexican as his book was lacking in evidence.

During the trial of the Shedden massacre killers in 2009, Jane Sims, the crime correspondent of The London Free Press, stated the Bandidos Motorcycle Club sounded very much like the mindlessly macho He-Men Women Haters Club from the Our Gang short films of the 1930s. Peter Edwards, the crime correspondent of The Toronto Star, agreed with her, writing the Bandidos had "grandiose rituals and overblown mythology" that were "more the stuff of fantasy and macho escapism than reality" that strongly appealed to weak, insecure men. Edwards wrote that most of the victims of the massacre such as Jessome were the type of weak men who were attracted to the Bandidos less because they were criminals and more out of a desire to appear important and powerful. Edwards wrote that Jessome was a pseudo-gangster, describing him as a man who affected a gangster "attitude" as he took to strutting around in his Bandidos bikers' vest as he believed that this made him into someone powerful, but that he rarely committed any crimes. Edwards noted that Jessome worked between 10 and 12 hours everyday to support himself, which he used as evidence that Jessome did not live on the proceeds of crime as commonly believed. Edwards stated in a 2010 interview:

What struck me as bizarre was that most of the people who were murdered actually wanted out of the club, like these were murders for nothing. They couldn't bring themselves to quit, too afraid to quit. Such a bizarre contradiction, between what some may think is a power struggle when in fact (the victims) wanted out...There were differences individually. But they were all drawn to a symbol, and a pretty absurd symbol – (the Bandido was) a cartoon character stolen from a potato chip company. Like, you have a murder over that symbol? It's just bizarre. Nothing more to it, no money changed hands in the murders, nobody made a penny. To have that level of violence fought for absolutely nothing, except being in the pecking order of people who wear a cartoon character on their back. Just bizarre...Some of (the victims) were pretty nice guys, and my feeling is that if they hadn't gone to the farm that night, within five years they would have just wandered out of it again. I think most of the victims weren't real bikers, and would have gone on to regular lives.

== Books ==
- Arvast, Anita (2012). Bloody Justice The Truth Behind the Bandido Massacre at Shedden. Toronto: John Wiley & Sons. ISBN 9781118157459.
- Caine, Alex (2009), The Fat Mexican: The Bloody Rise of the Bandidos Motorcycle Club, Random House, ISBN 978-1-55468-044-3
- Edwards, Peter (2010), The Bandido Massacre; A True Story of Bikers, Brotherhood and Betrayal, HarperCollins Publishers Ltd, ISBN 978-0307372765
- Langton, Jerry (2010), Showdown: How the Outlaws, Hells Angels and Cops Fought for Control of the Streets, John Wiley & Sons, ISBN 978-0470678787
