= Hells Angels MC criminal allegations and incidents in Nova Scotia =

Criminal incidents involving the Hells Angels in Canadian province

The Hells Angels Motorcycle Club was involved in a number of criminal allegations and incidents in Nova Scotia between 1984 and 2003.

== Origins ==
On 5 December 1984, the Thirteenth Tribe biker gang of Halifax led by David Carroll "patched over" to become the first Hells Angels chapter in Atlantic Canada. Unlike the other Hells Angels chapters, the Halifax chapter was very much dependent upon the chapters from Quebec in order to function. In 1984, Allan "the Weasel" Ross, the boss of the West End Gang, told the Hells Angels Yves Trudeau that he was willing to forgive the drug debts owned to him by the Halifax chapter in exchange for the Halifax chapter paying Trudeau money that Ross owned him. Carroll paid Trudeau $98,000, only to learn that Trudeau was entitled to one-quarter of what he had paid. Carroll along with Réjean Lessard planned the so-called Lennoxville massacre ad Carroll along with several members of the Halifax chapter were present at the massacre. In May 1986, Carroll along with the rest of the Halifax chapter were arrested for living off the avails of prostitution. Hells Angels rules require that all chapters must have at least six active members at any given moment, and the mass arrest threatened to have charter of the Halifax chapter pulled. A number of Hells Angels from British Columbia went out to Halifax to serve for two week intervals until the Halifax chapter finished their prison sentences.

== Heyday of the Halifax chapter ==
In 1990, Carroll moved to Montreal to join the Montreal chapter, but remained closely involved in the Halifax chapter, which he visited on a regular basis. According to the police informer Dany Kane, between April and November 1996 Caroll shipped 30 kilograms of cocaine from Montreal to Halifax. Carroll had a low opinion of the Halifax chapter, whom he disparaged as "a bunch of Boy Scouts". The only member of the Halifax chapter whom Carroll respected was Mike McCrea, the chapter president who rose to become the world secretary of the Hells Angels. Besides for McCrea, the person whom Carroll saw the most in Halifax was Paul Wilson, the owner of the Reflections gay bar. Wilson was charged with money laundering in 1998 after the police found $294, 010 in cash on him after a roadside stop. In February 1997, Carroll sent Kane along with his lover Aimé Simard to Halifax to kill a locally prominent businessman Robert MacFarlane. ON 27 February 1997, Kane and Simard shot and killed MacFarlane in a Halifax industrial park. Kane was to later claim that Wilson had paid for the murder of MacFarlane.

The journalists Julian Sher and William Marsden wrote the Halifax chapter was "not an impressive crew". Mike "Speedy" Christiansen spent 10 years in prison after his conviction for rape as he joined several bikers in gang-raping a 16-year-old girl in 1971. Danny Fitzsimmons, the sergeant-at-arms, was convicted of assault after he attacked a cameraman for CBC News. The other prominent members of the chapter were Neil "Nasty" Smith and Clay McRea, the younger brother of Mike McCrea. In 1998, a "full patch" member of the Halifax chapter, Gregory Brushett, vanished and is believed to have been murdered by his fellow Angels to prevent him from turning Crown's evidence after he was convicted of three counts of cocaine trafficking.

Randy Mersereau, a member of the Halifax chapter broke away in 1998 to found his own gang under the grounds: "I'm here to make money. I'm not making money as a Hells Angel". Mersereau was one of the founding members of the Halifax chapter who been convicted of the same 1971 gang rape that Christiansen had been involved in. Another gang allied to the Hells Angels were the Marriot brothers, Billy and Ricky, of Spryfield. Kane reported to his police handers: "Carroll is very disappointed by the leadership exercised by the Hells Angels in Halifax. Caroll wanted to take control of the drug trade in that city, but feared that the HA in Halifax didn't have what it takes to do the job. It was time to shake things up". In October 1998, a Hells Angel associate, William Wendelborg, was murdered. Later courtroom testimony stated that Wendelborg was killed by Billy Marriot and Larry Pace in a murder paid for by Wilson. Ricky Marriot along with his wife, Gail Marriot, were found murdered inside of their house on 20 November 1998. Pace pleaded guilty to being an accessory to murder with regards to Wendelborg's slaying while Billy Marriot facing charges of first degree murder for killing his own brother hanged himself in his jail cell on 7 August 2000.

== The Port of Halifax ==
The port of Halifax was a center of drug smuggling and between 1991 and 2003, the police seized $2.5 billion worth of drugs at the port. Numerous employees at the port had Hells Angels ties. Sidney Peckford, the director of the Ports Police in Halifax said: "I knew them all-I knew their faces. I knew what they were involved in. Nobody was prepared to muscle them around because they didn't know what repercussions were going to occur off the docks". Bruce Bine, who replaced Peckford in 1993, said of his time as director: "I was naïve politically. I thought a honest cop could survive. Within about two months, I knew I was in the fight of my life". Along with Eric Mott, a Ports Police constable, Brine raised concerns that a number of employees at the Port of Halifax had Hells Angels ties and were almost certainly involved in drug smuggling. The directors of the Port of Halifax made it clear to Brine and Mott that they had no interest in investigating allegations of Hells Angels influence on the waterfront, especially after a woman who worked as a cleaner who was dating a Hells Angel sued the Port of Halifax corporation after she was sacked on Brine's advice.

The attempts on the part of Brine and Mott to fire Debbie Milton, an executive at Protos Shipping who was married for a time to a Hell Angel Robbie Milton, led to much ill-will as the port of Halifax corporation felt there was no merit to the allegations. In 1995, Brine was fired from the port of Halifax for "serious misconduct". Brine later sued under the grounds that he was fired for investigating Hells Angels influence in the port of Halifax. Mott testified: "There was no question in my mind that there were investigations going on-I did them!" Richard Gordin, a Mountie testified that Peckford had told him: "Brine did not know when to quit. His investigations of the Hells Angels were causing him a lot of grief because of the complaints being raised by the port and other powerful officials". The Royal Canadian Mounted Police concluded in 1998 there was "no independent evidence" that Brine was investigating the Hells Angels, and hence his claim to have been fired for investigating the Angels were bogus.

== The Mersereau murders ==
In 1999, Kane reported that Carroll had decided to kill Randy Mersereau. On 31 October 1999, Mersereau was murdered. His younger brother, Kirk Mersereau, had vowed to avenge him and in March 2000 Kane reported that Carroll had decided to kill Kirk Mersereau. On 10 September 2000, Kirk Mersereau along with his wife Nancy were found killed execution-style inside of their farmhouse inside of Halifax.

== The conviction of Wilson ==
Wilson left Halifax in June 1999 and lived incognita for next year. Wilson lived in British Columbia for a time under alias of David Michaud and was by own admission involved in drug smuggling. Wilson then went to Grenada where he was arrested in June 2000 with 19 kilograms of cocaine worth $1. 15 million being found in his hotel room. In November 2000, Wilson was extradited to Canada to face two counts of first-degree murder. Wilson's trial ended on 8 April 2004 with him making a plea bargain with the Crown where he pledged guilty to ordering the murders of MacFarlane in 1997 and Wendlborg in 1998.

== Disbandment ==
The Halifax chapter came to end in 2003 when police arrests put the chapter below the 6 man limit, leading to its charter being removed. The Halifax Regional Police and the Royal Canadian Mounted Police in a joint operation recruited a small time drug dealer known only as "Bill" due to a court to work as an informer."Bill" saw the Hells Angels murder another drug dealer and in 2006 he told the journalists Julian Sher and William Marsden: "I would either kill them or be killed". The undercover work of "Bill" led to the three "full patch" Angels from the Halifax chapter being convicted of drug charges. Paul Derry, a drug dealer helped the Angels murder a Port of Halifax worker, and agreed to turn Crown's evidence when faced with first degree murder charges. Derry told Sher and Marsden: "In the eye of the public, I come out of this looking like a hitman who got away with murder. I appeased my guilt by ratting on everyone. But you gotta deal with it. It comes down to this: me going to jail for life or them". Derry served no prison time and is currently living in hiding under an alias. Derry's testimony led to the conviction of one "full patch" member of the Halifax chapter along with several "prospects" and "hang-arounds". Hells Angels rules require a chapter to have at least six members at any given moment or else lose their charter. As the Halifax chapter had four members following the convictions, Sonny Barger revoked the charter of the Halifax chapter in 2003, which ceased to exist. McCrea was forced to return his bikers vest with the Hells Angels patch following the revocation of the Halifax chapter.

== Books ==
- Langton, Jerry (2010). Showdown: How the Outlaws, Hells Angels and Cops Fought for Control of the Streets. Toronto: John Wiley. ISBN 978-0470678787.
- Langton, Jerry (2015). Cold War How Organized Crime Works in Canad and Why It's About to Get More Violent. Toronto: HarperColllins. ISBN 978-1-4434-3255-9.
- Sher, Julian; Marsden, William (2003). The Road to Hell How Biker Gangs Are Conquering Canada. Toronto: Alfred Knopf.
- Sher, Julian; Marsden, William (2006). Angels of Death: Inside the Bikers' Empire of Crime. Toronto: Alfred Knopf Canada. ISBN 9780307370327.
