= Normand Hamel =

Canadian gangster (1956–2000)

- Born: 16 March 1956; Montreal, Quebec, Canada
- Died: 17 April 2000 (aged 44); Laval, Quebec, Canada
- Other name: "Biff"
- Occupations: Outlaw biker, gangster
- Allegiance: SS MC (1981–1986); Hells Angels MC (1986–2000)

Normand Hamel (16 March 1956 – 17 April 2000), better known as "Biff", was a Canadian outlaw biker and gangster. A senior member of the Hells Angels Motorcycle Club in Montreal, Hamel was the right-hand man of Hells Angels leader Maurice "Mom" Boucher and became one of Quebec's top drug traffickers before he was shot dead in 2000. A member of the rival Rock Machine gang, Tony Duguay, was convicted of Hamel's murder in 2006 but was acquitted of the killing in 2016 after a witness in the case admitted that he lied while on the witness stand.

== Gangster ==
Hamel was born in Montreal to a working-class family. He became involved in organized crime sometime in the 1970s and was charged with selling drugs in 1978. In 1979, Hamel made a plea bargain and was sentenced to a year in prison. In 1981, he joined a white supremacist biker gang called the SS that existed to beat up non-white immigrants. During his time in the SS, Hamel became the best friend of Maurice "Mom" Boucher. By 1985, Hamel was a "prospect" (the second level of an outlaw biker club) with the Hells Angels Laval chapter.

Hamel was present at the Lennoxville massacre of 1985 when five members of the Hells Angels Laval chapter were killed by their fellow Hells Angels. As the organizer of the massacre, Réjean Lessard thought that Hamel was still useful. Hamel was held at gunpoint outside the Hells Angels Sherbrooke clubhouse and told he could either join the Sorel chapter or go back inside to be executed along with the other members of his chapter; Hamel chose the former. Having made his choice, Hamel guarded the clubhouse with orders to shoot down any members of his chapter who tried to escape the massacre. Having joined the Sorel chapter, Hamel in the aftermath of the massacre went to the Hells Angels hitman Yves "'Apache" Trudeau who was in rehab for his cocaine addiction to tell him that he had been expelled from the Hells Angels as a member "in bad standing", and that all of his possessions were now forfeit. Hamel told Trudeau that he could rejoin the Hells Angels provided that he murder three men whom Lessard wanted to see dead. Trudeau killed Jean-Marc "La Grande Gueule" Deniger, a drug dealer competing with the Hells Angels. As a reward, Hamel gave Trudeau his Harley-Davidson motorcycle back, saying that if completed his task by killing the other two people on Lessard's list, he could be allowed back in as a member "in good standing".

In 1986, Hamel was being held at the Parthenais jail when another inmate started to shout that he wanted to undergo a lie detector test to prove his innocence. Hamel was annoyed by the shouting and proceeded to beat the man bloody. On 5 October 1986, he became a "full patch" member of the Hells Angels. Hamel helped to pave the way for Boucher to join the Hells Angels later in 1986.

On 28 April 1987, Boucher killed Martin Huneault, the leader of a rival biker gang called the Death Riders. At Huneault's funeral, Boucher and Hamel were observed talking with two other Death Riders, Mario Martin and André Richard, about having the Death Riders join the Hells Angels now that their leader was dead. The Laval-based Death Riders ultimately folded into the Hells Angels, with Hamel responsible for supervising the new members.

Hamel was the manager of a company, Irazu Inc, in charge of importing coffee from Costa Rica into Canada. The owner of Irazu Inc was a very elderly man, Richard Muselle, who rarely ventured outside of his house. Millions of dollars were later found hidden in Muselle's house. When Boucher was arrested for hijacking a truck in Mississauga in 1988, Hamel paid his $10,000 bail. On 14 November 1994, informer Dany Kane told his police handlers: "Biff Hamel, another HA [Hells Angel] Montreal member, is the main associate of 'Mom' Boucher. These two have very good relations with the top level of the Italians [the Rizzuto family] and are considered the richest members of HA Montreal". Kane reported that Hamel "controlled" numerous bars in Montreal, Sorel and the Laurentians and was moving into taking over bars in the Gatineaux and Ottawa.

In early 1995, Kane reported to his police handlers that Hamel was going to be joining an elite new chapter of the Hells Angels to be called the Nomads. On 25 June 1995, Hamel was a founding member of the Nomads. Besides for Hamel, the other members of the Nomad chapter were Boucher, Walter "Nurget" Stadnick, Scott Steinert, Donald "Pup" Stockford, Gilles "Trooper" Mathieu, Richard "Bert" Mayrand, Luc Bordeleau, Pierre Laurin, Louis "Mélou" Roy, Richard "Rick" Vallée, André Chouinard, Michel Rose, Denis "Pas Fiable" Houle, Normand Robitaille and René "Balloune" Charlebois. He became one of the most important drug dealers in Quebec, in charge of selling cocaine throughout la belle province. In November 1995, four members of the Rock Machine were arrested and charged with plotting Hamel's murder.

== Murder ==
On 17 April 2000, Hamel was gunned down when attempting to flee from Rock Machine assassins in a Laval parking lot while he and his wife were taking his son to the doctor. Hamel—‌who was unarmed—‌was shot down as he attempted to run away from his killers, taking two bullets in the back. Following Hamel's death, the Death Riders gang which he supervised merged with the Hells Angels' main puppet club, the Rockers Motor Club. On 12 May 2000, the Angels attempted to kill the two Rock Machine members suspected of killing Hamel, Tony Duguay and Denis Boucher, leading to a wild car crash, during which Duguay took bullet wounds to his arms, right hand, and thigh.

Duguay, the Rock Machine member who was convicted of killing Hamel in 2006, was acquitted in 2016 when it was established that the eyewitness who gave the testimony that had convicted him had been fed information incriminating him by Detective Benoît Roberge, the senior anti-biker detective with the Montreal police who was secretly working for the Hells Angels, and that the witness had not actually seen Duguay kill Hamel as he had testified during his trial. The witness stated in 2016 that everything he said at Duguay's trial was perjury, claiming that Detective Roberge had forced him to perjure himself.

== Books ==
- Cherry, Paul (2005). The Biker Trials: Bringing Down the Hells Angels. Toronto: ECW Press. ISBN 978-1550226386.
- Langton, Jerry (2010). Showdown: How the Outlaws, Hells Angels and Cops Fought for Control of the Streets. Toronto: John Wiley. ISBN 978-0470678787..
- Langton, Jerry (2015). Cold War How Organized Crime Works in Canada and Why It's About to Get More Violent. Toronto: HarperColllins. ISBN 978-1-4434-3255-9.
- Schneider, Stephen (2009). Iced: The Story of Organized Crime in Canada. Toronto: John Wiley & Sons. ISBN 978-0470835005..
- Sher, Julian; Marsden, William (2003). The Road To Hell How the Biker Gangs Are Conquering Canada. Toronto: Alfred Knopf. ISBN 0-676-97598-4.
