= Hells Angels MC criminal allegations and incidents in Manitoba =

Hells Angels criminal allegations in Manitoba

The Hells Angels Motorcycle Club has involved in a number of criminal allegations and incidents since becoming established in Manitoba in 2000.

== Origins ==
Since the 1960s, the two biker gangs in Manitoba were los Brovos and the Spartans. In the early 1990s, the Hells Angels national president Walter Stadnick frequently visited Winnipeg to meet with both los Brovos and the Spartans as he sought to play off the two gangs. The journalists Julian Sher and William Marsden wrote that Manitoba was crucial in the Canadian underworld because it was "the axis of distribution for any drugs moving east and west in the country." The majority of the drugs in British Columbia are either consumed locally or exported to more profitable markets such as the United States, Japan and Australia. The majority the drugs in the Prairie provinces originate in Montreal and arrive via Ontario. Winnipeg is the main point where drugs enter the Prairies, which led Stadnick to place much emphasis upon control of the Winnipeg underworld.

In 1995, Stadnick had the Angels' puppet club in Montreal, the Rockers, set up a puppet club in Winnipeg called the Redliners. A Winnipeg police officer, Ray Parry, said of the Redliners: "They were the most polished. Their hair was well trimmed... The way they conducted themselves was a carbon copy of the Hells Angels' thinking at the time and was completely foreign to the way things had operated in the West." As a puppet club of a puppet club, the police reported the "triple insulation" made it difficult to tie Stadnick to the Redliners. The police informer Dany Kane, told his handlers in April 1995 that Stadnick was frequently making trips to Winnipeg "in order to establish a corridor for drug sales from Thunder Bay, Ontario to Winnipeg."

By May 1996, Stadnick was on the verge of having los Brovos join the Hells Angels, but his plans were set back when at a party in Halifax, Donald Magnussen, impulsively murdered a los Brovos biker, David Boyko. In September 1997, it emerged that four Spartans had gang-raped a teenage girl in their clubhouse. To avoid the infamy of associating with the Spartans, Stadnick threw his support behind los Bravos, granting them hang-around status with the Angels on 18 October 1997. Shortly afterwards, the Redliners joined los Bravos, which increased Stadnick's influence in los Bravos. In June 1998, the Spartans gang disbanded themselves after their leader Darwin Sylvester vanished without trace. On 29 May 1998, Sylvester went to a meeting, vanished and is generally believed to have been murdered. The man who drove Sylvester to the meeting Robert Rosmus, was murdered a few months later. By 1998, an officer with the Royal Canadian Mounted Police stated that Stadnick was selling "virtually all of the drugs in Winnipeg". On 21 July 2000, Stadnick promoted los Bravos, headed by Ernie Dew, up to "prospect" status from the "hang-around" status they had been granted in October 1997. On 22 December 2000, Stadnick arranged for Dew and los Bravos gang to join the Hells Angels as "full patch" members after only five months of waiting as prospects instead of the normal year. The los Bravos gang became the Hells Angel Winnipeg chapter with Dew as the new chapter president.

A puppet gang, The Zig Zag crew, was founded to serve the Hells Angels. The Zig Zag Crew in turn sold drugs to other criminal groups in Manitoba, most notably the First Nations gangs such as the Redd Alert, the Manitoba Warriors and the Native Syndicate. The journalist Jerry Langton wrote that in the early 21st century there was "a period of near-hegemony in Winnipeg's organized crime by the Hells Angels through their allies, the Zig Zag Crew".

== Family feud ==
Kevin Sylvester, the younger brother of Darwin Sylvester, had nursed a grudge against the Hells Angels for the presumed murder of his brother. Sylvester had once been expelled from the Spartans for being "over the edge", had been involved in a dozen shootings in Winnipeg, was stabbed in prison, and survived a shooting. On 21 June 2001, Sylvester saw a Hells Angel, Rod Sweeney, stop his car at a railroad crossing, and pulled up his motorcycle to open fire on Sweeny. Sylvester told the police: "I dunno, I just lost it, lost my temper. I pulled out the gun and shot him". Sweeney was shot four times, taking bullets to his head, shoulder, arm and leg. On 22 June 2001, another Hells Angel, Glen MacEachern, was wounded in a shooting attack.

On 27 June 2001, Michael Carroll, a friend of Sylvester, was wounded in a drive-by shooting. Ian Grant, a member of the Zig Zag Crew, was charged with the attempted murder of Carroll. By July 2001, there had been several shootings in Winnipeg related to the feud and on 2 July 2001 Sylvester's house was firebombed after someone threw Molotov cocktails at it. Sylvester was the object of a shooting attack while driving his automobile. Grant along with a Hells Angel "prospect", Dale Donovan, and a Hells Angel "hang-around", Sean Wolfe were charged with conspiracy to commit murder with regard to that incident. On 31 July 2001, there was another attempt to kill Sylvester while he was driving his car. Dale Sweeney, the younger brother of Rod and also a Hells Angel member, was charged with the attempted murder of Sylvester.

The Crown chose to make a plea bargain with Sylvester under which he would testify that Dale Sweeney was the man who had tried to kill him in exchange for a reduced sentence of only two years in prison for the attempted murder of Rod Sweeney. At the trial of Dale Sweeney in June 2002, he was defended by Alan D. Gold, one of Canada's most expensive defense lawyers. Gold sought to put Sylvester on trial in a sense, portraying him as a violent man who had made a plea bargain with the Crown to escape serious prison time for his crimes. Sylvester testified that he had thrown away the gun he used to try to kill Rod Sweeney with, but Gold produced a police report that revealed that a ballistics test had showed that the same gun that had been used against Sweeney had also been used against MacEachern. The bombshell revelation destroyed Sylvester's credibility as a witness as he continued to insist that he had thrown away the same gun that had been used to shoot MacLachern with. The trial ended in September 2002 with Justice Perry Schulman stating that Sylvester was a worthless witness who had brazenly committed perjury in his courtroom and Sweeney was acquitted of attempted murder. Sylvester was convicted in 2013 of an attack upon a family after an incident in 2012 where he rammed a van with his car and pulled a gun on the family inside the van.

== Mainstream status ==
The Winnipeg chapter of the Hells Angels had their clubhouse in the upper-middle district of West Kildonoan. Ernie Dew, the president of the Winnipeg chapter, was a licensed automobile mechanic whose house was likewise located in a middle-class neighborhood of St. Andrew. Bernie Dubois, the former president of the Redliners, lived across the street from Dew.

== Intimidation ==
In February 2002, a Winnipeg policewoman was woken up when someone threw a brick through the window of her house at about 2 am. She saw two young men with Molotov cocktails who were clearly planning to set her house ablaze, but who ran away when they saw her. The arson attempt is believed to have the work of the Zig Zag crew. Members of the Zig Zag Crew walked into a 7-Eleven store in the Elmwood district and brazenly engaged in shop-lifting by not paying the food they took with them. After the members of the Zig Zag Crew were arrested for theft, on 26 March 2002, a Molotov cocktail was tossed into the 7-Eleven store, which failed to explode. On 30 March 2002, another attempt to burn the store with Molotov cocktails was more successful and the store was burned down.

Robert Coquete, a member of the Zig Zag Crew and a professional kickboxer was due to stand trial on charges of assault after a gym owner, Joe Soares, whom Coquete was alleged to have beaten up on a New Year's party on 31 December 2000. On 2 April 2002, the day before Coquete's trial was due to start, someone shot up Soare's house. At the trial, the brothers Tyler and John Childlow testified that Coquete had assaulted Soares. The trial ended with the judge acquitting Coquete. The same day, the houses of the Childlow brothers was destroyed in a case of arson. Ray Perry, an officer with the Winnipeg police service stated that the climate of intimidation with death threats, assaults and arson even against police officers, made it almost impossible to prosecute the Hells Angels in Manitoba.

On 8 April 2002, Coquete was arrested at an airport on his way to Europe. Coquete turned Crown's evidence and named a number of Manitoba Hells Angels and Zig Zag Crew members as the perpetrators of violent acts. Howeover, Coquete changed his mind about testifying, which led to the Crown staying the charges of conspiracy to commit murder and gangsterism against five Hells Angels in 2004 after it was clear that Coquete was not willing to testify. Coquete was paid $100, 000 dollars for his testimony, but he changed his mind in June 2004 and left the witness protection program without testifying.

== Murders ==
In the spring of 2002, Daniel Tokarchuk, a member of the Zig Zag Crew, had started to abuse THE cocaine he was supposed to be selling. In debt to the tune of $15, 000, Tokarchuk ambushed and killed his boss in the Zig Zag Crew on 12 May 2002, Trevor "Boss" Savoie, shooting him dead as he left his house. Tokarchuk was convicted of second degree murder. On 12 May 2003, Tokarchuk's younger brother, Kevin Tokarchuk, was shot dead in a revenge attack. On 15 December 2002, the corpse of a Lithuanian immigrant, Vitajlijus "VT" Killkevicius, was found in a farmer's field in Rosser. Killkevicius had worked as a drug dealer for the Winnipeg chapter of the Hells Angels and his murder was punishment for failing to pay his drug debts. On 2 June 2005, Aaron Hannibal, a drug dealer who worked for the Zig Zag Crew, went to see his Zig Zag supplier, Daniel Kachkan, a man he greatly disliked. The meeting went badly. Later the same day, Hannibal was found bleeding with 19 stab wounds, and died of blood loss. At least 15 people witnessed the stabbing, but none were willing to testify. Kachkan was murdered on 1 November 2010, aged 34, being stabbed to death on the streets of Winnipeg.

== The Old Joe's case ==
In August 2002, the police arrested two men along with Dawn Marie Deane, the sister of Winnipeg Hells Angels, Bernie Dubois, on charges of selling cocaine out of the Old Joe's Sports Lounge in the north end of Winnipeg. The Crown Attorney at Deane's trial, stated to the jury: "This is quite common in Winnipeg, where cocaine is delivered to your doorstep just like a pizza". Deane was convicted and sentenced to four years in prison. The Old Joe's case attracted much attention as the Old Joe's was located right next to the riding office of Gord Mackintosh, who was the Manitoba minister of justice at the time. Mackintosh complained that the intense rivalry between the Royal Canadian Mounted Police, which serves as Manitoba's police force, and the Winnipeg police made it impossible to prosecute the Hells Angels. Ray Parry of the Winnipeg police service said of the relationship between the Hells Angels and the Zig Zag Crew: "There is no rivalry, no predatory group. It's a business, it's about making money and they're very efficient about how they do it".

== The Atanasovic case ==
Franco Atanasovic was a career criminal who sold drugs for the Hells Angel Ian Grant. Atanasovic had run up a $65, 000 drug debt with Grant in 2002, but the Winnipeg chapter president Ernie Dew had told Grant to forgive the debt. However, in 2005, Grant told Atanasovic that he still owned him the money, which led for Atanasovic to turn informer as he lacked the means to repay the debt. While wearing a wire, Atanasoivic recorded Grant making death threats as well as striking him several times. Grant was recorded as saying that Atanasovic should buy his cocaine and methamphetamine from Dew. On the basis of the evidence collected by Atanasovic, on 15 February 2006 the police arrested Dew, his wife Vera, Grant, and another "full patch" Hells Angel Jeff Peck. Despite the fact that Atanasovic was a poor witness on the stand who admitted to stealing $5, 000 from the Winnipeg police, the trial ended with a victory for the Crown. Grant was convicted and sentenced to 15 years in prison. Vera Dew made a plea bargain with the Crown where she admitted to selling cocaine for the Hells Angels and agreed to forfeit her house in St. Andrew. Ernie Dew, the president of the Winnipeg chapter, at first attempted to defend himself in the courtroom before deciding to hire a defense lawyer. Dew was found guilty and sentenced to 13 years in prison.

== The Robertson case ==
In Thompson, Manitoba, a pair of Albanian immigrant brothers, Bekim Zeneli and Mohammed Zeneli, worked as drug dealers. The Zeneli brothers came into conflict with a Hells Angel, Scott "Taz" Robertson, a truck driver who smuggled drugs from Winnipeg to Thompson. Robertson was a former member of the Spartans who was one of the last people to see Darwin Sylvester alive before he disappeared on 29 May 1998, and had then joined the Redliners and finally the Hells Angels. Robertson turned informer after facing charges, and allowed the RCMP to record his phone calls. On 12 December 2006, the RCMP recorded Robertson saying in a call phone that the Zeneli brothers were a "problem". At a meeting at the Victoria Inn Hotel with three other Hells Angels, one of the Angels told Robertson: "I'm going to get someone to whack him". On 1 July 2007, Bekim Zeneli was found in a Winnipeg motel torturing a man tied to a chair, but the charges were dropped after the victim refused to testify.

In November 2007, Robertson while wearing a wire, recorded a plot to kill the Zeneli brothers, whom it was stated were major competition for the Hells Angels in Thompson. Bekim Zeneli was found murdered inside of his townhouse on 7 December 2007. On 11 December 2007, the police launched Operation Drill, arresting Dale Donovan, the president of the Angels' Winnipeg chapter along with a "prospect" Alain LeBras and a member of the Oshawa chapter, James Heickert Donovan and LeBras were convicted of drug trafficking. Heicket was charged with plotting to kill Sean Heicket, a drug dealer who worked for the Zeneli brothers. James Heickert was convicted and sentenced to 25 years in prison. Langton wrote: "Indeed the Hells Angels had secured Thompson, but their reputation as money-hungry drug dealers who would kill their brothers-both metaphorical and biological-over debts led to a group of deeply disgruntled people in Winnipeg".

== Project Divide ==
A "full patch" member of the Zig Zag Crew, Michael Satsatin, turned police informer in 2009 and while wearing a wire recorded plans to sell cocaine, heroin, Ecstasy, methamphetamine, OxyContin and marihuana along with guns. Satsatin's recording also revealed that every member of the Zig Zag Crew had to pay $1, 000 to a particular Hells Angel per month and do most of the Hells Angels work for them in exchange for the possibility of one day being allowed to join the Hells Angels. On the basis of evidence collected by Satsatin, the police in Winnipeg and Brandon launched raids on 1 December 2009 that led the arrests of 34 people along with the seizure of 10 pounds of cocaine, 12 ounces of methamphetamine, 12, 000 Ecstasy pills, an ounce of heroin and 7 pounds of marijuana. Every member of the Zig Zag Crew were arrested in Project Divide. To replace the Zig Zag Crew, the Hells Angels founded a new puppet gang, the Redlined Support Crew. A former member of the Zig Zag Crew, Fat Corey, who had allied himself with the Rock Machine was heard to make insulting remarks about the Hells Angels. In January 2010, Corey suffered what the police called a "vicious beating" at the hands of the Redlined Support Crew. On 3 February 2010, Justin MacLeod of the Redlined Support Crew, was arrested in connection with the beating.

== Project Flatlined ==
On 16 March 2012, the Winnipeg police launched a series of raids that led to the arrest of the Hells Angels Winnipeg chapter president, Dale Sweeny, his brother Roderick Sweeney who was a "full patch" Hell Angel and another "full patch" Angel Carmine Putri. Also charged with Hells Angels associates Kurtis Scott and Christopher Gerula along with Bredin Wall and Donovan Lafrance of the Redlined Support Crew. All were found guilty or made plea bargains. Dale Sweeney was sentenced to 11 years in prison for drug trafficking.

== The Beaumont murder ==
Jean Paul Beaumont, a former member of the Zig Zag Crew who joined the Rock Machine was found murdered inside his cell at the Brandon Correctional Centre on 14 October 2012. A Hells Angel serving his sentence at the same prison as Beaumont, Jeff Peck, was charged with another murder in November 2012. Peck was charged with the murder of Robert Conroy in 1982 at the Collins Bay prison in Ontario.

== Books ==
- Auger, Michel; Edwards, Peter (2012). The Encyclopedia of Canadian Organized Crime: From Captain Kidd to Mom Boucher. Toronto: McClelland & Stewart. ISBN 978-0771030499.
- Langton, Jerry (2010). Showdown: How the Outlaws, Hells Angels and Cops Fought for Control of the Streets. Toronto: John Wiley. ISBN 978-0470678787.
- Langton, Jerry (2015). Cold War How Organized Crime Works in Canad and Why It's About to Get More Violent. Toronto: HarperColllins. ISBN 978-1-4434-3255-9.
- Sher, Julian; Marsden, William (2003). The Road to Hell How Biker Gangs Are Conquering Canada. Toronto: Alfred Knopf.
