= David Carroll (biker) =

Canadian outlaw biker and gangster (born 1952)

- Images of Carroll distributed by Interpol
- Born: David MacDonald Carroll; 1 April 1952; Dartmouth, Nova Scotia, Canada
- Disappeared: 28 March 2001 (aged 48); Ixtapa, Guerrero, Mexico
- Status: Missing for 25 years, 6 months and 7 days
- Other name: "Wolf"
- Occupations: Outlaw biker; gangster
- Allegiance: 13th Tribe MC; Hells Angels MC
- Conviction: Living off the avails of prostitution (1986)
- Penalty: 1 year imprisonment (1986)

David MacDonald Carroll (born 1 April 1952), better known as "Wolf", is a Canadian outlaw biker and reputed gangster who was a member of the elite Nomad chapter of the Hells Angels Motorcycle Club in Quebec. He disappeared in March 2001 after being indicted on 13 counts of first-degree murder.

== Early career ==
Carroll was born and grew up in Dartmouth, Nova Scotia. He became the leader of a Halifax biker gang known as the Thirteenth Tribe Motorcycle Club, which had been founded in 1968. The 13th Tribe Motorcycle Club had reigned as the dominant outlaw motorcycle gang in the province of Nova Scotia as early as the 1970s and its members had an outwardly defiant and hostile attitude towards police authority. By 1971 it had gained a large following and had formed a relationship with the Popeye Moto Club, a notorious Quebec-based biker gang which, in 1977, would eventually become the very first Canadian chapter of the Hells Angels. The Halifax underworld is very closely linked to the Montreal underworld and David Carroll soon had an alliance with the Hells Angels of Montreal. Like many other biker gangs around the world, Carroll and the rest of the 13th Tribe MC had a strong admiration for the Hells Angels MC and sought to emulate its organizational structure in their own club.

The Thirteenth Tribe won the trust of the Hells Angels by providing, in the fall of 1984, bodyguards for Walter "Nurget" Stadnick as he was recovering in a Hamilton hospital from the traffic incident that disfigured his face. A nurse recalled: "It was crazy; most of the day there were these big, burly bikers outside his room. And the rest of the time it was these big, burly cops – it was like he was a rock star or something. You could tell these bikers were small-town boys; they weren't used to the cops like what we had here in Hamilton. They used to taunt and tease the bikers all the time – trying to start a fight, eh?". The 6′3″ (190 cm) policeman and former football player John Gordon Harris warned Carroll that if he did not cease his unruly behaviour, he would have him and the rest of the 13th Tribe arrested. On 5 December 1984, the Thirteenth Tribe became the first Hells Angels chapter in Atlantic Canada with Carroll as chapter president. This occurred on the very same day that the Gitans Moto Club of Sherbrooke had also been absorbed by the Hells Angels. A report from the Royal Canadian Mounted Police (RCMP) described the "patch over" of the Thirteenth Tribe as a move "to consolidate control of drug trafficking on Canada's East Coast".

== Hells Angels ==
The Hells Angels hitman Yves "Apache" Trudeau was told by the West End Gang boss Allan "The Weasel" Ross that he should collect the money owed to him for four murders that Ross had hired him to commit from the Hells Angels chapters in Halifax and Sorel, which were in debt to Ross. Ross promised Trudeau that he was willing to forgive those debts if the two chapters paid the money owed to him to Trudeau instead. Carroll, as the president of the Angels' Halifax chapter, paid Trudeau $98,000. Carroll later learned that the Laval chapter was actually entitled to one-quarter of the money, and that Trudeau had used the extra money to support his cocaine addiction. Carroll met with Réjean "Zig Zag" Lessard of the Angels' Montreal South chapter to discuss the matter, and it was decided to take action against the Angels Montreal North chapter, to which Trudeau belonged. Carroll was involved in the plans for the Lennoxville massacre, working with Lessard to discuss plans to remove the Montreal North chapter, whom Carroll and Lessard had decided were a liability for the Hells Angels. In March 1985, Carroll went to Quebec to assist Lessard against the Laval chapter.

Carroll, who was present at the Lennoxville massacre of 24 March 1985, was charged with first-degree murder for his actions during the massacre, but was acquitted in 1987. Besides Carroll, two other members of the Halifax chapter, Randy Mersereau and Mike McCrea, were also charged with murder and acquitted. During his time in a Montreal jail while he was trying to raise bail, Carroll learned passable French. When Carroll returned to Halifax after his time in a Montreal jail, he was so poor that he took to shoplifting groceries to feed himself.

In Halifax, he worked as a pimp and demanded 40% of all the earnings made by the local prostitutes. One prostitute who felt that Carroll was the greediest pimp in Halifax complained to the police that he had given her a vicious beating because she refused to hand over 40% of her earnings to him. On 30 May 1986, Carroll was arrested together with the seven members of the Halifax chapter and charged with living off the avails of prostitution. Carroll together with the other accused was convicted and sentenced to one year in prison. Prison psychiatric evaluations credited him with a genius intelligence quotient. The arrests and convictions nearly put an end to the Halifax chapter because Hells Angels rules require that all chapters must have at least six active members at any given moment, and that any chapters with fewer than six members will have their charters revoked, meaning that all of the remaining members will be automatically expelled. With the arrests and convictions of the entire Halifax chapter for living off the avails of prostitution, Sonny Barger and the other American leaders of the Hells Angels were about to revoke the Halifax chapter's charter, leading Carroll to ask for the help of the Angel chapters in the Lower Mainland. In response, the Hells Angels in British Columbia sent out six of their members to Halifax to serve as temporary members of the Halifax chapter for an average of two weeks in rotation until Carroll and the others were released.

On 7 April 1988, Carroll was again charged with first-degree murder in connection with the death of a young man in Dartmouth said to be in a drug debt to the Hells Angels, a trial that again ended in his acquittal. In 1990, Carroll moved to Quebec. He settled in Morin-Heights, a village in the Laurentian Mountains north of Montreal, where he lived with his French-Canadian common-law wife and their son. Despite moving to Montreal, Carroll retained control of the Halifax chapter. Carroll controlled a drug pipeline running from Halifax to Montreal. Carroll became the patron of Dany Kane in 1991 and in 1992 taught Kane how to fire a handgun properly.

Carroll wore the Hells Angels' "Filthy Few" special patch consisting of the SS lightning bolt runes. In the outlaw biker subculture, wearing a special patch with the SS lightning bolt runes is believed by the police to indicate that the wearer has committed a murder. The journalist Yves Lavigne wrote: "Only killers can wear the black-and-white Filthy Few patch and the black-and-white SS lightning bolts". In July 1993, Carroll along with Stadnick tried to have Frank "Cisco" Lenti, the president of the Loners gang, "patch over" to join the Hells Angels at a bikers' convention in Wasaga Beach, an offer that Lenti declined. During the 1993 Wasaga Beach convention, Carroll wore a custom-made black T-shirt with the white SS light bolt runes alongside the message "Filthy Few Denmark", which Lenti understood as Carroll's way of saying that he committed a murder in Denmark. In early 1994, Carroll help recruit Dany Kane of the Angels puppet club, the Evil Ones of Drummondville, to serve as the president of new puppet club in Toronto to be called the Demon Keepers. The Demons Keepers were founded in January 1994 and collapsed by April 1994, a failure that Kane blamed on Carroll, whom he stated was too drunk to provide the necessary support he needed. Kane was so embittered by the failure that he turned police informer in October 1994. According to Kane in his reports to his police handlers, Carroll was in business with the Rizzuto family, owning a bar in Saint-Sauveur. By 1997, Carroll had purchased land to build condominiums in Saint-Sauveur and was the owner of several nightclubs in Montreal.

=== Quebec Biker War ===
During the Quebec biker war, Carroll displayed a raging hatred of the Rock Machine as Kane reported that Carroll "seemed to take the [biker] war personally" and that for him "there did not exist any peaceful means to end the conflict". Kane described Carroll as "a very bad businessman... Wolf makes a lot of money but he can't keep it". In his reports, Kane described Carroll as a hard-drinking Hells Angel who was "chronically broke". Kane reported that he would visit Carroll in his house to discuss drug deals and then go out with the Carroll family to their favourite Vietnamese restaurant in Morin-Heights, saying he found the juxtaposition of criminality and domesticity to be quite jarring. Carroll was described by journalists such as Julian Sher, William Marsden and Peter Edwards as an arrogant, ill-tempered bully with an intense contempt for anyone who was not a Hells Angel. Kane, in his reports, stressed that Carroll displayed abnormal amounts of anger and hatred towards the Rock Machine. Kane reported that, along with Boucher, Carroll was the Hells Angel who had taken out the most contracts on the lives of Rock Machine members. In his reports, Kane described Carroll as personally collecting intelligence on the Rock Machine, which was unusual for a "full patch" Hells Angel.

In the first days of February 1995, Kane reported that Carroll had planted a bomb in Quebec City that cost one person their leg. Kane found himself in the middle of a power struggle between Carroll and another Hells Angel, an American living in Montreal named Scott Steinert. Kane in his reports stated that Steinert was the most aggressive of the Angels as Kane described Steinert as a bully with a belligerent and unpleasant personality. Steinert served as Maurice "Mom" Boucher's right-hand man as he made more money than any of the other Angels in Montreal. Steinert often mocked Carroll, boasting that he made more money than he did, and Kane reported that the two men hated each other. The journalists Julien Sher and William Marsden wrote that the feud between Carroll and Steinert was like "the twisting schemes of ambitious and sometimes psychotic medieval princes". When Carroll asked Kane to drive him to Halifax in March 1995, Steinert refused to allow it and the two men almost came to blows over the issue. Reflecting the power balance, Donald "Bam Bam" Magnussen, the bodyguard to Stadnick, went over to serving as Steinert's bodyguard as Magnussen believed that Steinert would soon be the new Hells Angels national president. Steinert formed a gang within the gang that he called the groupe de Cinq ("group of Five") that took over drug dealing along Crescent Street in Montreal and York Street in Ottawa, both of which were Carroll's territory. Steinert also started to sell drugs all over Quebec, Ontario and Manitoba, which both Stadnick and Carroll considered to be their territory.

Carroll also remained engaged with the Halifax chapter, which he regularly visited. On 25 June 1995, Carroll became a founding member of the Angels' elite Nomad chapter. Besides Carroll, the other members of the Nomad chapter were Stadnick, Boucher, Steinert, Donald "Pup" Stockford, Gilles "Trooper" Mathieu, Richard "Bert" Mayrand, Luc Bordeleau, Pierre Laurin, Louis "Mélou" Roy, Richard "Rick" Vallée, André Chouinard, Michel Rose, Denis "Pas Fiable" Houle, Normand Robitaille, Normand "Biff" Hamel, and René "Balloune" Charlebois. The Nomads were led by a triumvirate with Carroll responsible for Atlantic Canada, Boucher Quebec and Stadnick the rest of Canada.

Steinert was described as a businessman who was concerned with only making money who went to bed early to start work promptly in the morning, while Carroll was described as a man who liked to stay up as he enjoyed hosting parties. One policeman said of Carroll: "He's the type of guy who believes that a biker gang is drinking beer and having fun. They're criminals, but it's important to have fun. And he's disappointed to see the money end of it has taken over. The Nomads were business, business, business". Boucher tended to side with Steinert against Carroll at first as Steinert consistently made larger profits than Carroll. Kane reported that Carroll had told him that he was unhappy about the way that the Hells Angels had ceased to be a motorcycle gang as Kane recorded Carroll as saying to him: "The Nomads judge you by the size of your portfolio. If you don't have money, you're no good. Our club is no longer really a real biker gang. There are some members who have told me they don't even like biking". Carroll also told Kane that he had no fear of arrest because he had "a very good contact in the police".

According to Kane, between April and November 1996, Carroll shipped thirty kilograms of cocaine from Montreal to Halifax. Carroll tended to import drugs via Montreal and then shipped the drugs to Halifax. In an attempt to circumvent Gerald "Big Gerry" Matticks and the West End Gang who controlled the Port of Montreal, Carroll moved to have the Hells Angels complete their control of the Port of Halifax. Sidney Peckford, the last director of the Canada Ports Police, said of the Halifax dockworkers: "I knew them all – I knew their faces. I knew what they were involved in. Nobody was prepared to muscle them around because they didn't know what repercussions were going to occur off the docks". Two policemen with the Ports Police, Bruce Brine and Eric Mott, expressed much concern in the early 1990s that several stevedores and cane operators working in the Port of Halifax had Hells Angels connections, only to be brushed off by the executives of the Halifax Port Authority who insisted that this was not a problem. Most notably, the people whom Brine and Mott had accused of working for the Hells Angels such as Paul Arthur, a crane operator; Derrick Slaunwhite, a stevedore; Brian Dempsey, a dock worker; and Robert Langille, another dock worker, would be later convicted of smuggling for the Hells Angels in the early 2000s. Debbie Milton, a senior corporate official with Protos Shipping in Halifax was known to be a close friend of Carroll's wife. Laurence Coady, Milton's boyfriend, told Constable Mott, that: "Jesus Christ, I almost shit myself! I'm home, there's a knock on the door and who shows up – Wolf Carroll!"

Tom O'Neill of the RCMP reported: "Everybody [in the Halifax chapter] bowed down to him. It was like the general is coming down; they've got to snap to attention and salute the flag: 'Wolf's in town – everybody got to go to the clubhouse. Get your bikes out, get your colours out – Wolf is here!'" The only Halifax Hells Angel Carroll respected was the chapter president Mike McCrea, with the rest of the chapter he dismissed as "a bunch of Boy Scouts". Besides McCrea, the only other Haligonian that Carroll seemed to have any respect for was Paul Wilson, the owner of the Reflections bar, which, unusually for a gay bar, was very popular with the local Hells Angels. Wilson took envelopes full of cash to Carroll from Halifax to Montreal. In February 1998, Wilson was arrested in Montreal with some $294,010 in cash on his person and charged with money laundering for the Hells Angels. Sher and Marsden described the Halifax chapter as "not an impressive crew". The sergeant-at-arms, Danny Fizsimmons, was a bad-tempered, thuggish man who once attacked a CBC cameraman at a biker event and went to prison for assault. The camera footage showed Fizsimmons shouting "I told you to get that out of my fuckin' face!" as he then proceeded to punch out the cameraman. The only member of the 13th Tribe left in the Halifax chapter by the 1990s besides Carroll and McCrea was Michael "Speedy" Christiansen, who spent 10 years in prison for raping a 16-year-old girl in 1971. Clay McCrea and Neil "Nasty" Smith were two low-level drug dealers who were only allowed to join the Halifax chapter because they were respectively the brother and brother-in-law of the chapter president Mike McCrea.

Carroll had a very heated feud with another Hells Angel, Scott Steinert. Kane reported that Carroll believed that Steinert's bodyguard, Donald "Bam Bam" Magnussen, was a police informer and wanted him killed. Kane did his best to encourage Carroll to believe that Magnussen was an informer as a way to distract attention from himself. The Hells Angels came to be divided into two factions, one loyal to Steinert and another loyal to Carroll and Stadnick. During a party in Halifax hosted by Carroll on 12 May 1996, Magnussen impulsively killed David Boyoko, a member of Winnipeg's los Bravos gang who were considering joining the Hells Angels. Besides setting back Stadnick's plans to have los Bravos join the Hells Angels, Carroll was enraged that Maugnussen had killed someone in Halifax without consulting him first, which he took as an insult, saying the Angels never killed in Halifax without obtaining his permission first. In October 1996, Kane reported that Carroll and Stadnick had offered him $10,000 to kill Magnussen. Desperate, Kane asked his RCMP handlers to warn Magnussen, saying he was trapped as to refuse the contract would result in his murder while to execute the contract would result in Steinert killing him. Kane was saved by Boucher, who declared that the "full patch" Magnussen could only be killed by another "full patch" Hells Angel and not a member of the Rockers Motor Club puppet club such as Kane. In February 1997, Magnussen, in a moment of drunken rage, savagely beat up Leonardo Rizzuto, the son of Mafia boss Vito Rizzuto, outside of a bar on St. Laurent Boulevard. Kane reported that Rizzuto had joined Carroll and Stadnick in pressing for Magnussen to be killed.

In February 1997, Carroll came into dispute with Robert MacFarlane, a prominent Halifax businessman who owned cellphone and security companies who was known to be linked to the Hells Angels. MacFarlane was considered by anyone who knew him to be a bullying trouble-maker who was constantly getting into bar fights. MacFarlane was described by one Halifax policeman as: "If you were walking a beat downtown and you saw Bob MacFarlane, you knew within hours you'd be called to that bar. Very obnoxious, very loud, very much full of himself". Another policeman, Bruce Macdonald, stated that the Hells Angels put a $25,000 contract on McFarlane's life "because he was such an asshole". Sher and Marsden called MacFarlane "the kind of braggart that even bikers tire of". Wilson admitted during his guilty plea in 2004 that he was the behind the contract on MacFarlane. A statement to the Halifax police made in November 1999 by Okan Arslan – described as "a guy who was close to Paul Wilson" – stated that Kane was a hitman for Carroll and that Wilson paid Carroll to have MacFarlane killed.

Kane, together with his lover Aimé Simard were assigned the task of killing MacFarlane and drove out to Halifax. On the evening of 27 February 1997, MacFarlane noticed that his car was being followed by a car driven by Kane, and he stopped his vehicle in an industrial park to confront the two men who were following him. Simard shot MacFarlane from the passenger's seat with a .38 handgun, causing him to run away as he screamed in pain at his wound. Both Simard and Kane got out of their car to give chase and shot down MacFarlane. Kane ended up being charged with first-degree murder in connection with MacFarlane's murder. Kane informed Carroll that the Mountie Tom Townsend was accusing him of being an informer, portraying it as an attempt by the Crown to force him to confess by falsely tagging him as an informer. Kane's handler, Sergeant Gaétan St. Onge stated: "He [Kane] was very smart. He knew Carroll had been accused of murder in Halifax and that the police had tried a similar ploy with him. And so he also knew that Carroll would understand and pass the word to the others that Kane was not talking".

On 4 November 1997, Steinert, together with his bodyguard Magnussen, were last seen alive leaving the Lavigueur mansion where they lived to see Boucher. Their bodies were later found floating in the St. Lawrence River with their heads bashed into bloody pulps after being repeatedly hit with baseball bats and hammers. Sher and Marsden wrote the killers of Steinert and Magnussen "were likely the Nomads". Carroll told Kane that there was a rift within the Hells Angels between La Table faction versus Roy who refused to join La Table. Carroll, who liked Roy, stated to Kane that he hoped that the dispute would not cause any issues. Carroll discussed plans with Kane to kill a few members of the Loners motorcycle gang in Ontario in order to frighten the rest of the Loners into an alliance with the Angels.

=== Feud with the Mersereau brothers ===
Carroll became involved in a feud with a former Hells Angel, Randy Mersereau, who had broken away from the Halifax chapter to found his own group. Mersereau was engaged in talks with the Bandidos motorcycle gang to have his gang became a Bandidos chapter, which Carroll took as a threat. Carroll also had a tense relationship with the Marriott family that dominated the drug trade in Spryfield, but who were willing to work with the Hells Angels. In 1998, Kane reported: "Carroll wanted to take control of the drug trade in that city [Halifax], but he feared that the HA [Hells Angels] in Halifax didn't have what it takes to do the job. It was time to 'shake things up'". In October 1998, a drug dealer in Harrietfield, William Wendelborg, was murdered in a contract killing with the killer being Billy Marriott. Marriott beat Wendelborg with a baseball bat and then injected him with enough cocaine to give him a fatal heart attack. The next month, Ricky Marriott of the Marriott family, together with his wife Gail, were found murdered in their home with the prime suspect being his brother Billy Marriott. Wilson was charged with hiring Marriott to commit the murders, and Kane's reports to the police stated that he had reason to believe that Wilson was acting on behalf of Carroll. Facing charges of first-degree murder, Billy Marriott was found hanged in his cell in the Halifax Correctional Centre on 7 August 2000. The police believe that Carroll was responsible for eight murders in the Halifax area between October 1998 and September 2000. In a plea bargain with the Crown, Wilson pleaded guilty to two counts of second-degree murder on 7 April 2004, admitting that he hired Marriott to kill Wendelborg and Kane and Simard to kill MacFarlane.

In May 1999, Carroll was quite threatening to a group of visiting Loners led by their national secretary Glenn "Wrongway" Atkinson to the Angels' Sherbrooke chapter clubhouse, demanding to know why the Loners' national president Gennaro "Jimmy" Raso had failed to come to Quebec, saying he would not tolerate this insolence. Atkinson later told the journalist Peter Edwards that he had the impression that Raso's life would be in danger if he snubbed the Angels again. On 23 September 1999, Randy Mersereau was wounded by a bomb planted in his car dealership in Truro. The evening of 31 October 1999 was the last time that Mersereau was seen alive, and his car was found abandoned later that night along Highway 102 between Halifax and Truro. Kane reported on 3 November 1999 that Mersereau had been killed by a hit squad from Montreal, with his body buried in a forest. Mersereau's skeleton was only found in December 2010. Randy's younger brother, Kirk Mersereau, vowed to avenge him. Carroll met with Kirk Mersereau to deny that he was involved in his brother's murder. On 31 March 2000 Kane reported: "Wolf told me he tried to explain things to that guy, but he didn't understand. He told me that Randy's brother was going to die very soon".

In April 2000, Carroll sent Kane to Toronto to meet the leaders of the Para-Dice Riders gang. Kane reported that Carroll wanted him to kill Gennaro Raso, the president of the Loners Motorcycle Club, in order to improve relations so that the Para-Dice Riders would join the Hells Angels. On 19 April 2000, Kane went to Toronto to meet the Para-Dice Rider leaders to discuss what Loners they wanted him to kill. Kane reported that Carroll wanted him to blow up the clubhouse of the Loners in Woodbridge with the aim of killing the entire gang. Kane sabotaged the Toronto assignment by encouraging his contacts with the Para-Dice Riders to talk loudly in public about the coming massacre of the Loners, which led Carroll to declare that the Para-Dice Riders were "idiots" who were not to be trusted. According to Kane, Carroll had told him that he was $500,000 in debt to La Table faction of the Hells Angels and he was desperately looking for a way to make more money.

On 18 June 2000, Kane reported that Carroll's drug debt to La Table faction was down to $400,000 and he hoped to have his debts paid off by the summer. Kane further mentioned that Carroll was deeply unhappy with the way that La Table dominated the Hells Angels in Quebec, and he was thinking about returning to Nova Scotia. Carroll told Kane that with the Hells Angels everything was "business et seulement business" and members were only judged by how much money they made. Carroll felt that the Hells Angels were no longer a "brotherhood", and he was being sidelined. Carroll used as an example that Boucher had promoted René Charebois up to being a "full patch" Nomad without consulting him in clear violation of the chapter's rules. Carroll told Kane: "I'm at a turning point. I can't live here. It's pretty and all, but I can't make any money".

On 27 June 2000, Carroll met Kane in a McDonald's in Truro and then went for a walk. Kane reported to his handlers: "He [Carroll] told me that Randy's brother had put a contract on his head and he must die for that... He wants me to kill Randy's brother". Later on the evening of the same day, Kane reported that he had attended a meeting in the Halifax clubhouse and that: "Mike [McCrea] and Wolf talked about having Kirk killed. Wolf said to Mike that he would have to kill Kirk". Carroll also showed Kane the police statement by Arslan that described Kane as Carroll's hitman. Carroll expressed concerns that Wilson might soon turn informer, and Kane reported: "Wolf told me that Paul has to die". On 10 September 2000, Kirk Mersereau, together with his wife Nancy, were found murdered execution-style in their farmhouse outside of Halifax.

== Operation Springtime and disappearance ==
On 28 March 2001, as part of Operation Springtime, a warrant was issued for Carroll's arrest. He was charged with 13 counts of first-degree murder. At the time, Carroll was in Ixtapa, Mexico. Fearing that the Mexican authorities were corrupt, the Canadian authorities did not inform the Mexicans in advance of Operation Springtime. On the morning of 28 March 2001, an extradition request was filed with the Mexican government for Carroll together with two Hells Angels in Mexico, Yves Dubé and André Chouinard. Only Dubé was arrested and extradited while both Chouinard and Carroll disappeared with Ixtapa police claiming to be unable to find the two tourists. An affidavit from the Crown stated that Carroll had at least $1 million in a numbered bank account in Antigua. Chouinard later returned to Canada and was arrested in the Eastern Townships on 18 April 2003. In 2003, the chapter Carroll founded in Halifax in 1984 came to an end with the convictions of several of its members, which caused the chapter to fall below six men, leading to the charter of the chapter being revoked.

Carroll is believed to have fled to Brazil, which has no extradition treaty with Canada. Carroll was rumoured to have been seen several times in the West Indies between 2001 and 2009. Carroll was also seen several times in British Columbia and Ontario. The Canadian journalist Daniel Sanger wrote that it was most odd that Carroll had never been placed on the Royal Canadian Mounted Police's most wanted list despite being wanted on charges of first-degree murder, gangsterism, conspiracy to commit murder and various drug offences. Sanger noted that people who are on the RCMP's most wanted list are wanted for crimes less serious than alleged to have been committed by Carroll. The Interpol notice on Carroll reads: "Hells Angels have chapters in more than 20 countries and information suggests that Carroll has frequented a number (of them) including Brazil, Mexico, Australia, New Zealand, South Africa, United States (as well as countries in South America and Europe)." The last sighting of Carroll was reportedly in Australia in 2012.

== Books ==
- Auger, Michel; Edwards, Peter (2012). The Encyclopedia of Canadian Organized Crime: From Captain Kidd to Mom Boucher. Toronto: McClelland & Stewart. ISBN 978-0771030499.
- Cherry, Paul (2005). The Biker Trials: Bringing Down the Hells Angels. Toronto: ECW Press. ISBN 978-1550226386.
- Derry, Paul (2009). Treacherous How the RCMP allowed a Hells Angel to kill. Regina: Coastal West Publishing. ISBN 9780981240831.
- Edwards, Peter (2010), The Bandido Massacre; A True Story of Bikers, Brotherhood and Betrayal, HarperCollins Publishers Ltd, ISBN 978-0307372765
- Langton, Jerry (2006). Fallen Angel: The Unlikely Rise of Walter Stadnick and the Canadian Hells Angels. Toronto: Harper Collins. ISBN 144342725X.
- Langton, Jerry (2010). Showdown: How the Outlaws, Hells Angels and Cops Fought for Control of the Streets. Toronto: John Wiley. ISBN 978-0470678787..
- Lavigne, Yves (1999). Hells Angels at War. Toronto: HarperCollins. ISBN 0002000245.
- Sanger, Daniel (2005). Hell's Witness. Toronto: Viking Canada. ISBN 0-670-04430-X.
- Schneider, Stephen (2009). Iced: The Story of Organized Crime in Canada. Toronto: John Wiley & Sons. ISBN 978-0470835005.
- Sher, Julian; Marsden, William (2003). The Road To Hell How the Biker Gangs Are Conquering Canada. Toronto: Alfred Knopf. ISBN 0-676-97598-4.

== See also ==
- List of fugitives from justice who disappeared
