= Scott Steinert =

American outlaw biker and gangster (1962–1997)

- Born: 1962; Beloit, Wisconsin, U.S.
- Died: 4 November 1997 (aged 34–35); Sorel, Quebec, Canada
- Occupations: Outlaw biker, gangster
- Allegiance: Hells Angels MC

Scott Steinert (1962 – 4 November 1997) was an American outlaw biker and gangster who was a member of the Hells Angels Motorcycle Club in Montreal, Quebec, Canada. He is generally regarded as the man behind the 9 August 1995 car bomb which accidentally killed 11-year-old Daniel Desrochers during the Hells Angels' war against the Rock Machine.

== Early life ==
Steinert was born in Beloit, Wisconsin into an upper-middle-class family. Steinert's father was a senior executive with the Beloit Corporation and in 1970 he was appointed to a position with the Montreal office of the corporation. Steinert spent the rest of his youth growing up in Montreal. Steinert came from a loving home and was spoiled by his upper-class parents. Steinert was considered to be an intelligent student, but not one who was academically inclined; he was also a badly behaved child who was frequently in trouble with his teachers.

At the age of 16, Steinert started to smoke hashish and was soon abusing LSD. By the age of 18, Steinert had three convictions for selling drugs. He dropped out of school at the age of 18, was expelled by his parents owing to his substance abuse, and moved to Vancouver. In British Columbia, Steinert lived on welfare while working as a drug dealer, leading to a Corrections Canada report to note: "In this way he was fully able to live his hedonist and marginal lifestyle". By the age of 21, Steinert had numerous convictions for break and enter, assault, possession of narcotics, and possession of stolen goods. In 1985, Steinert returned to Quebec and was arrested in October 1985 in Sorel for selling two kilograms of PCP to an undercover Mountie. In December 1985, Steinert pleaded guilty in exchange for not being deported to the United States and was sentenced to five years in prison. Steinert's claims to be an independent drug dealer were not believed as one Corrections Canada report from 1985 stated: "It is difficult to imagine that the Hells [Angels] would permit the intrusion of an outsider into the drug market when one knows how tightly they control this very lucrative business".

The prison file on Steinert stated "He is outgoing and has a good demeanor. He answers questions without any reticence and with a remarkable transparence!" and mentioned he was fond of weight-lifting; however, the report went on to state that Steinert's body was heavily covered with tattoos (which in Canada, at the time, was viewed as an indication of a criminal lifestyle) and refused to see the prison psychologist. Despite their concerns, prison officials wrote that Steinert had "interesting qualities", "higher than average potential" and was "more a marginal than a delinquent". In 1987, Steinert was granted parole. Steinert's parents had moved back to the United States by this point, but Steinert moved in with his French-Canadian girlfriend. Steinert founded an insulating business with money borrowed from his parents. Steinert's parole officer wrote: "Scott spends most of his free time with Louise. He enjoys going to the movies, downhill skiing and playing football during the summer months. He has a very small circle of friends, 'legit' people, he tells us".

In 1988, Steinert was charged with acting as an enforcer for a loan shark. A man who was in debt to a loan shark complained to the police that Steinert had beaten him up and threatened to kill him. Steinert was sentenced to 10 months in prison and was free again in the middle of 1989. Prison officials noted that Steinert had an "elastic morality" and a "pronounced taste for luxury". After his release in 1989, Steinert started to associate more and more with the Hells Angels. Fluently bilingual in both French and English, Steinert was described by the journalist Jerry Langton as being "utterly charming" when he wanted to be. Steinert had an exceptionally long criminal record with numerous convictions for assault, uttering death threats and narcotics possession.

== Hells Angel ==
In the early 1990s, Steinert joined the Hells Angels Montreal chapter, being sponsored by Robert "Ti-Maigre" Richard, one of the most famous Hells Angels in Quebec, who played a prominent role in the Lennoxville massacre of 1985. Like many biker nicknames, Richard's nickname of ti-maigre ("tiny") was meant to be ironic as Richard was a gigantic man with only one eye. Detective Benoit Roberge of the Service de police de la Ville de Montréal stated: "Steinert started off low, but he gained a lot of power as he got heavily involved in the biker war". Unusually, Steinert skipped the "hang-around" stage in the Hells Angels and entered as a "prospect" (the second level in an outlaw biker club). Langton described Steinert as "big, strong and armed with the power of persuasion", but that his "impulsive, aggressive ways did not endear him to everyone". However, Steinert was one of the top "earners" in the Hells Angels and an expert bomb-maker.

It was Steinert who first recruited Dany Kane, who was to later become an extremely valuable police informant within the Hells Angels, into one of their puppet clubs. Kane reported in 1994 to his RCMP handlers that Steinert had a certain "star quality", and that he thought Steinert would be a "full patch" member within a year or so. Kane described Steinert as the only Hells Angel who provided leadership during his ill-fated time as the leader of the Demon Keepers puppet club in Toronto in early 1994. Steinert had become the leading rival to the Hells Angels national president, Walter "Nurget" Stadnick, and made no secret of his belief that he would be a better national president. Steinert mocked Stadnick for the failure of the Demon Keepers puppet club of 1994, and, reflecting Stadnick's damaged status, Stadnick's bodyguard, Donald "Bam Bam" Magnussen switched over to serving as Steinert's bodyguard. Kane reported to his RCMP handlers that Steinert had unfriendly relations with Stadnick and his deputy, David "Wolf" Carroll. Kane reported that Steinert was already the leader of his faction within the Hells Angels and that friendship with Richard gave more influence than his rank as a "prospect" would suggest.

Kane reported in November 1994 that Steinert had become the right-hand man to Maurice "Mom" Boucher and was buying up C-4 explosives to make bombs. Kane reported that Steinert had purchased twenty pounds of C4 explosives and had assembled a team of bomb-makers led by Patrick Lambert. In late November 1994, Steinert had 10 bombs planted around Montreal with the aim of killing Rock Machine members, but none of the bombs exploded due to faulty detonators. Kane described Steinert as being a very aggressive bully who was completely ruthless in his willingness to win the Quebec biker war for the Hells Angels. In another report to his police handlers in November 1994, Kane stated; "Mom Boucher hands out the execution orders for the current war with the Rock Machine. Steinert is the executioner". Kane stated to his police handlers that Steinert planned to move to Ontario once he received a "full patch" to start the first Hells Angels chapter in that province.

Kane's reports to his RCMP handlers stressed that Steinert had a most belligerent and unpleasant personality. Steinert served as Boucher's favorite Hells Angel as he made more money than any of the other Angels in Montreal. Steinert often mocked his rival David "Wolf" Carroll-whose personality was much like his own-boasting that he made more money than him, and Kane reported that the two men hated each other. The journalists Julien Sher and William Marsden wrote the feud between Carroll and Steinert was like "the twisting schemes of ambitious and sometimes psychotic medieval princes". The Canadian criminologist Steven Schnedier wrote that Steinert was an ambitious psychopath who was one of the most dangerous men in the Hells Angels. Steinert was in charge of building bombs, personally murdered members of the Rock Machine and had purchased aerial photographs of Montreal to better help plan his assassinations. Kane reported that Steinert was supplying strippers all over Canada and the West Indies. Kane reported that the attractive French-Canadian strippers he was recruiting had attracted the attention of the New York Mafia and that a Mafia "soldier" from New York had contacted Steinert to recruit strippers for a Mafia-owned club in the Dominican Republic. Kane stated that the resort which included a number of condos and a marina was a front for money laundering. Kane concluded his report that Steinert was willing to recruit strippers, but only for a cut of the profits from the club, which he used as an example of Steinert's audacity and greed as he did not defer to the Mafia at all.

In January 1995, Kane reported that Steinert was driving around Montreal looking for the Rock Machine leader Paul "Sasquatch" Porter with the aim of killing him. The same month, Kane reported that Steinert was involved in a murder attempt against another Rock Machine member, André "Curly" Sauvageau, leading to a wild car chase down Highway 40. By early 1995, Steinert founded a gang within the gang which he named the groupe de cinq ("group of five"), which started to take over the bars on Montreal's Crescent Street and on York Street in Ottawa, both of which were the territories of his rival Carroll. Likewise, Steinert started selling drugs in western Montreal, which Carroll regarded as his area to sell drugs. At the same time, Steinert started to sell drugs in Toronto, Kingston, and Winnipeg. A kilogram of cocaine that went for $35,000 in Montreal was worth $45,000 in Winnipeg, and Steinert's greed let him to ignore Stadnick's orders not to sell cocaine in Winnipeg in competition with him. A very ambitious man, Steinert founded a stripper agency, Sensation, which competed with the Aventure stripper agency, which was owned by Carroll. Sher and Marsden wrote that Steinert "was a strong money-maker, boldly shipping large quantities of cocaine and hash through the Hells' Canadian network...Steinert was the bolder-or simply-crazier personality [than Carroll]. He was a killer and cared nothing for the privileges of rank if they got in the way of his ambitions". Unlike Carroll, Steinert went to bed early to start work promptly in the morning, which endeared him to Boucher, who respected Steinert for his work ethic and ability to make consistently large profits. In March 1995, when Carroll ordered Kane to drive him to Halifax, Steinert refused to allow it, which almost caused a brawl between the two men. Kane reported to his RCMP handlers that he thought that Stadnick and Carroll were the "past" of the Hells Angels while Steinert was the "future". In one of his reports, Kane wrote that Steinert had told him that he was making $100,000 per month from his cocaine sales in northern Ontario. Steinert also told Kane that he was planning to go to Jamaica to recruit criminals for a black street gang he planned to found to challenge Master 13, a black street gang allied with the Rock Machine.

In May 1995, when Kane's wife, Josée gave birth to his son, Guillaume, he asked Steinert to be his child's godfather. The Canadian journalist Daniel Sanger wrote in the photos of the event "...Kane looks like an extra from a high school production of Guys and Dolls, wiry and youthful in a dark suit and tie, his hair slicked back, and a goofy grin below a moustache that might be pasted on. Steinert, taller and considerably more beefier, exudes a mix of menace and manliness in a leather jacket, jeans and cowboy boots". In July 1995, Steinert beat up the doorman to a Montreal nightclub who had refused him admission for wearing his Hells Angels colours. During a trip to Prince Edward Island, Steinert intended to provoke a fight with a group of visiting Satan's Choice bikers from Ontario, but his motorcycle broke down. The Satan's Choice bikers were able to repair Steinert's motorcycle, and in a rare act of gratitude led him to abandon his plans to beat them up. The Canadian journalist Daniel Sanger wrote: "Steinert's unpredictability and violent temper were issues enough among the more level-headed Hells Angels that he thought it advisable to move out of his Sorel home for several weeks that summer". Despite moving to a motel in Longueuil, Steinert remained in charge of paying the $10,000 in cash awarded to those who killed Rock Machine members.

In 1995, Kane reported that Steinert was still an American citizen, leading for the Canadian government to issue a deportation order against him. Boucher suggested to Steinert that if he was deported, he could buy Mexican citizenship for only $30,000. According to Kane, Boucher and Steinert had developed a plan to win over public opinion by killing one of their own in an especially brutal manner out of the hope that the public would blame the Rock Machine and decided that Marc Dubé – who was a low-level drug dealer working for the Angels – would be the one to be sacrificed. Kane reported that Steinert had ordered remote-controlled bombs from the bomb-maker Patrick Lambert in early August 1995. Kane stated: "Steinert was really excited and bragging that he was really going to do something that would be 'rock 'n' roll'". On 9 August 1995, Dubé was killed by a remote-controlled bomb planted in his jeep while an 11-year-old boy, Daniel Desrochers, playing across the street was killed by flying shrapnel from the bomb. Commander André Bouchard of the Montreal police stated: "I'm convinced today that the person who pressed the button to have the bomb explode saw children across the street. There was no way he could not see the children across the street".

A Royal Canadian Mounted Police (RCMP) report described Steinert as "a very violent and cruel psychopath who can't control himself", concluding he was the prime suspect for the bombing. The RCMP stated that the fact that whoever controlled the bomb that killed Dubé was aware that there were children playing across the street fitted in with what was known of Steinert's character and with what Kane had reported. Kane reported that the normally talkative Steinert was unusually quiet after the bombing and that: "since that day, Steinert no longer talked about the bombs he had ordered and never again spoke about using bombs. Steinert asked some of his crew what they thought of the bombing...When told they thought the murderer should be liquidated, Steinert didn't respond and became very pensive". In late 1995, Boucher was temporarily imprisoned, which led to the Rizzuto family curtailing its sale of cocaine to the Hells Angels as Vito Rizzuto did not trust the other Hells Angels leaders. Steinert complained that the "cocaine drought" as it was known had caused him to fill his orders in northern Ontario and that his reputation had suffered. In the fall of that year, Steinert founded the Sensations strippers agency that competed with the Agence Aventure strippers agency owned by Carroll. Kane reported in late 1995 that Steinert "was losing credibility among many members of the Montreal chapter...who don't appreciate his methods or way of acting in general". At Steinert's orders, Kane burned down the house that belonged to a man who had a land dispute with Boucher.

After getting over a fright caused by the killing of Desrochers, Steinert was in a cheerful mood, receiving the "Filthy Few" special patch made up of the SS lightning bolt runes in March 1996 that are awarded to those who killed for the Angels, and a "full patch" at the same time. In April 1996, Steinert warned Kane that it might be dangerous for him to retain his ties to Carroll. Steinert was the biggest pimp in Montreal, owning the Sensations escort service, whose office in Montreal was destroyed in a case of arson in August 1996 by the Rock Machine. The vast majority of strippers in Canada come from Quebec. Steinert's Sensations stripper and escort agency became the largest supplier of French-Canadian strippers in the cities and towns of northern Ontario, who also served as his spies, reporting to Montreal about the local criminals who spent their free time drinking in the bars of northern Ontario. Steinert used the information from his stripper spies to send out representatives to contract the local criminal element to assess their abilities. Langton wrote: "If he [the criminal] met their standards, the Hells Angels would start supplying him with drugs. In a very brief period of time, towns that had never seen the like before were full of Hells Angels-supplied strippers, escorts and drugs". Like many other Canadian gangsters, Steinert was fond of weight-lifting and steroid abuse. Sanger wrote that Steinert was "cocky and pigheaded by nature", which was made worse by the "roid rage" caused by his gross steroid abuse.

Steinert was a friend of Paolo "Paul" Cotroni, son of Cotroni crime family boss Frank Cotroni. Cotroni was ultimately killed by the Rock Machine on 24 August 1998 due to his association with the Hells Angels. Kane described Steinert as one of the few "full patch" Hells Angels who killed for the gang instead of assigning the task to someone else. In the summer of 1996, Steinert and his thugs moved to take over bars in Laval. In August 1996, Steinert had a van painted in the color of Hydro-Quebec, packed with a bomb that contained 90 kilograms of dynamite and attempted to have it driven into the Rock Machine's clubhouse in Verdun. The attack failed when the driver of the van jumped out too soon, causing the van not to hit its intended target while the bomb failed to explode owing to faulty construction. Steinert came to be angry about being excluded from the Nomad chapter, and wanted to defend the "honor" of the Hells Angels Montreal chapter. Kane reported that Steinert had "heard enough from the Nomads about the Montreal chapter being a bunch of goofs who were scared of taking action". Steinert created his "group of five" as a parallel organization within the Hells Angels that was intended to challenge the power of the elite Nomad chapter.

== Murder ==
By 1996, the Hells Angels became divided into two factions, with one loyal to Steinert and another loyal to Stadnick and Carroll. In October 1996, Steinert formalized his "group of five" as an official group within the Hells Angels that sought to challenge the elite Nomad chapter. The "group of five" were Steinert, Magnussen, Marc Sigman, Michel Lajoie Smith, and Normand Labelle. To join the "group of five", Steinert demanded that members pay a fee of $100,000, which deterred many Angels from joining. At the same time, Steinert purchased the ornate 17-bedroom mansion once owned by the Lavigueur family located on the ultra-wealthy island suburb of Ile aux Pruches. To hide his ownership of the Lavigeur mansion, Steinert had assigned several prét-noms ("lent-names") as the nominal owners. Steinert wanted Kane to pay him $100,000 to be a prét-noms in exchange for being allowed to live in the Lavigeur mansion. In November 1996, Steinert received his deportation order to the United States. Steinert in a bid to try to stay in Canada tried to be adopted into a Mohawk clan to allow him to live on the Kahnawake reservation that straddles the border between Quebec and New York state. Steinert ended his relationship with his French-Canadian common-law wife, by whom he had fathered a child by, to start dating another French-Canadian woman from a wealthy family whose parents owned a restaurant popular with the Hells Angels.

Steinert finally managed to void his deportation order by marrying a Canadian woman in late 1997. Steinert had also fathered a child by his bride, which his lawyers used to argue that it would be inhumane to send him back to the United States. In late 1996, Steinert was contacted by a Montreal filmmaker, Stéphane Chouinard, about using the Lavigeur mansion to make a pornographic film. Chouinard's first film, 1995's Quebec Sexy Girls #1 was an unexpected hit and was the most profitable Canadian pornographic film of that year. His second film, 1996's Quebec Sexy Girls #2 starred a handsome, well-endowed former Canadian Army corporal, Patrick Cloutier, whose photo entitled Face to Face of him facing off with a Mohawk Warrior during the 1990 Oka crisis was one of the best-known photographs of late 20th century Canada. Quebec Sexy Girls #2 was even more profitable than Quebec Sexy Girls #1 owing to Cloutier's starring role. The success of Quebec Sexy Girls #2 led Chouinard to decide to cast another celebrity in his next film, and as such Chouinard approached Steinert about starring in his next film. Besides the marriage ceremony at the Lavigueur mansion, Steinert also used the Lavigueur mansion to make in the summer of 1997 a pornographic film entitled The Babe Angel directed by Chouinard, starring himself, his wife and 9 of his prostitutes.

Carroll accused Steinert and Magnussen of being police informers, noting that the Crown was completely unsuccessful in its efforts to deport Steinert back to the United States, which led him to the conclusion that Steinert must have been working for the police. Kane, who was anxious to direct attention away from himself, strongly encouraged Carroll along this line of thinking, saying Steinert must be a police informer inside the Angels. Contributing to suspicions about Steinert and Magnussen was the interception of a shipment containing 31 kilograms of marijuana and 200 ecstasy pills sent by the duo to be sold to drug dealers in northern Ontario. While the RCMP was tipped off by Kane, he accused Steinert and Magnussen to Carroll of being behind the drug seizure.

Steinert and Magnussen were last seen alive on 4 November 1997, leaving the Lavigueur mansion to see Boucher. According to testimony from Sylvain Boulanger, a member of the Sherbrooke Hells Angels chapter who turned Crown witness, Steinert was returning from his honeymoon when he was summoned to a "fake meeting" at the Sorel chapter clubhouse. Boulanger testified: "They killed Scott with a hammer. They smashed his skull. After that, they threw him into the river". The bodies of Steinert and Magnussen were later found floating in the St. Lawrence River, with their hands tied behind their backs and their heads beaten to a bloody mush, showing wounds from repeated blows from baseball bats and hammers. Sher and Mardsen wrote the killers of Steinert and Magnussen were "likely the Nomads". Magnussen's corpse was discovered floating in the St. Lawrence in May 1998 while Steinert's corpse was discovered on 15 April 1999. Later in 1997, the Crown— unaware that Steinert was dead— finally won the deportation case with a judge ruling that Steinert should be sent back to the United States at once.

== See also ==
- List of unsolved murders (1980–1999)

== Books ==
- Cherry, Paul (2005). The Biker Trials: Bringing Down the Hells Angels. Toronto: ECW Press. ISBN 978-1550226386.
- Langton, Jerry (2006). Fallen Angel: The Unlikely Rise of Walter Stadnick and the Canadian Hells Angels. Toronto: Harper Collins. ISBN 144342725X.
- Langton, Jerry (2010). Showdown: How the Outlaws, Hells Angels and Cops Fought for Control of the Streets. Toronto: John Wiley. ISBN 978-0470678787..
- Langton, Jerry (2015). Cold War How Organized Crime Works in Canada and Why It's About to Get More Violent. Toronto: HarperColllins. ISBN 978-1-4434-3255-9.
- Lavigne, Yves (1999). Hells Angels at War. Toronto: HarperCollins. ISBN 0002000245.
- Sanger, Daniel (2005). Hell's Witness. Toronto: Viking Canada. ISBN 0-670-04430-X.
- Schneider, Stephen (2009). Iced: The Story of Organized Crime in Canada. Toronto: John Wiley & Sons. ISBN 978-0470835005.
- Sher, Julian; Marsden, William (2003). The Road To Hell How the Biker Gangs Are Conquering Canada. Toronto: Alfred Knopf. ISBN 0-676-97598-4.
