= Rockers Motor Club =

Canadian outlaw biker gang

Rockers MC
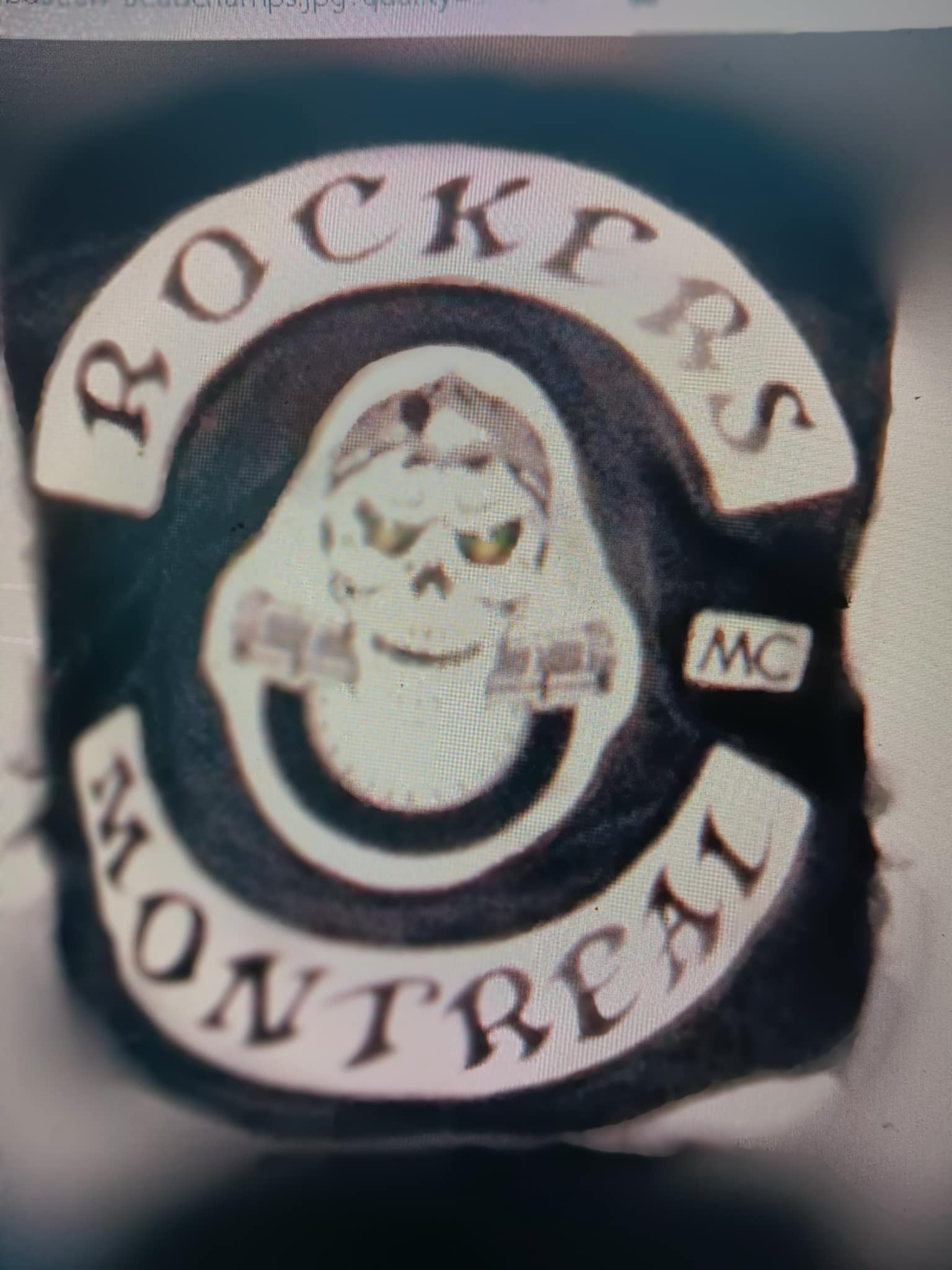
- Founded: March 26, 1992
- Founder: Maurice Boucher
- Founding location: Montreal, Quebec, Canada
- Years active: 1992–2001
- Territory: Practically exclusive to Quebec with some reported activity in North British Columbia
- Ethnicity: Mostly Quebeckers and Francophone Canadians
- Leaders: Pierre Provencher (President); Jean-Guy Bourgouin (Vice President)
- Activities: Drug trafficking, assault, intimidation, protection and murder
- Allies: Hells Angels MC; Death Riders MC; Evil Ones MC; The Syndicate; Redliners; Crack Down Posse
- Rivals: Rock Machine MC; Palmers MC; SS Elite MC; Dark Circle; Bandidos MC (2001)
- Notable members: Aimé Simard; Dany Kane; Stéphane Gagné; Francis Boucher; Paul Fontaine; Robert Johnson; Sébastien Beauchamp; Stéphane Sirois; René Charlebois

The Rockers Motor Club, often abbreviated as the Rockers MC, was a Canadian outlaw biker gang and support club for the larger Hells Angels Motorcycle Club.

Lasting from 1992 until 2001, the group played a significant role in the ill-famed Quebec Biker War. Acting not only as a recruitment tool to test the competence of bikers wanting to become Hells Angels, the Rockers Motor Club was also utilized to carry out numerous unlawful objectives of the Angels which included intimidation, violent assaults, and assassinations of their rivals in an effort to help the latter obtain total control over the nation's illegal drug trade.

Prior to the formation of the Angels-affiliated Rockers Motor Club in the early 1990s, another biker gang had coincidentally existed in the same area known as the Montreal Rockers Motorcycle Club, also nicknamed "the Rockers". This particular group emerged as a supporter club for the Montreal chapter of the Outlaws MC before eventually working its way up to become their second chapter within the city in 1978.

== History ==
The Rockers MC was first set up in March 26 of 1992 by then-President of the Hells Angels Motorcycle Club (HAMC) Montreal charter, Maurice "Mom" Boucher. It was during this time in Quebec that several organized crime entities were competing for drug turf across the French-speaking province. The Hells Angels MC, being among one of such prominent players in the criminal underworld, were challenged by a rivaling outlaw motorcycle gang, Rock Machine. Territory of the Hells Angels and Rock Machine began to overlap with one another which incited much conflict between the two before a large-scale gang war broke in 1994.

The Rockers were officially established a couple years before the Quebec Biker War began by high-ranking Hells Angels crime boss Mom Boucher. The aim of the club's creation was to provide more manpower and follower who were willing to commit crimes in order to become Hells Angels. In addition, the club was also setup as a means to distance the Hells Angels from unwanted police attention that would especially come from "street-level" crimes, and - thus, were often called upon to carry out HAMC's so-called "dirty work". Several other Hells Angels supporter motorcycle clubs were established for this same purpose around and after this time including the Damners MC, Demon Keepers MC, Evil Ones MC, Jackels MC, Jokers MC, Mercenaries MC and the Rowdy Crew MC. The Rockers were different from any other of the said HAMC puppet clubs, however, as they acted exclusively as the group's enforcement arm.

When settings up the Rockers, Maurice Boucher hand-picked his ambitious Haitian-Canadian protégé Gregory "Picasso" Woolley to shepherd the outlaw biker club. Woolley, an up-and-coming crime boss who got his start as an early member of the small-time Crack Down Posse street gang, had already worked alongside the Hells Angels as Maurice Boucher's bodyguard and earned his reputation after successfully forging an alliance between HAMC and the influential Italian-Canadian Rizzuto crime family (as well as several of the area's local street gangs) to manage Greater Montreal's illicit drug market. Woolley would shortly go on to form The Syndicate in 1998, another criminal organization to collaborate jointly with the Angels.

As a support club (synonymously referred to by police as "puppet clubs"), the Rockers MC operated under the discretion of the Hells Angels, most notably its Quebec Nomads chapter which consisted of Canada's most reputable and high-ranking members. In the context of law enforcement, "supporter" motorcycle gangs like the Rockers Motor Club act as auxiliary organizations to their dominant affiliated gang and, like in the case of the Rockers, may be used to help them facilitate various criminal activities.

During the year of 1995, Anglo-Canadian Hells Angels MC leader and Nomad chapter member Walter "Nurget" Stadnick instructed the Rockers Motor Club to found an auxiliary outlaw motorcycle club of their own which would be based out of out west in Winnipeg, Manitoba. The resulting one-percenter supporter club that came about was the Redliners, which Stadnick plan ned to oppose two of Western Canada's dominant biker gangs: the Los Brovos and the Spartans MC.

One of the most notable members of the Rockers was Dany Kane, a criminal from Montérégie who would later become a police informant for the Royal Canadian Mounted Police and the Sûreté du Québec.

While a member of the Rockers, Dany Kane would later come into contact with a small-time crook named Aimé "Ace" Simard via a gay online dating service. Unbeknownst to friends or acquaintances of either two, they engaged in a bisexual relationship with one other. Kane would eventually sponsor Simard into the ranks of Rockers MC. As a newly initiated member, Simard committed his first serious crime for them in early February 1997 after he shot and seriously wounded a drug dealer who had owed money to the club along with his girlfriend who was also present at the scene of the attack. Not long after, Aime Simard and Dany Kane traveled to Halifax, Nova Scotia on orders of high-ranking Hells Angels street lieutenant David "Wolf" Carroll to eliminate a drug dealing businessman named Robert "Bob" MacFarlane who had owed a financial debt to the Hells Angels. When the pair made their way into the province on February 27, 1997, Kane and Simard tracked down and confronted MacFarlane at an Industrial Park, who attempted to flee when they approached him. Before long, MacFarlane was gunned down by Aime Simard - marking the very first murder he had carried out for the club. To reward his success, the Rockers Motor Club granted Simard a spot on their crew of assassins (comedically referred to as their "football team").

In amidst of the war with Rock Machine, Rockers MC biker Paul "Fon Fon" Fontaine, along with an accomplice, murdered provincial prison guard Pierre Rondeau and nearly killed Rondeau's colleague, Robert Corriveau on Sept. 8, 1997. The attack was ordered by Maurice Boucher in an attempt to destabilize the Quebec justice system and frighten police informants who were either members or associates of HAMC. Fontaine was successfully awarded with membership into the Hells Angels MC Quebec Nomads chapter for this act.

In response to the targeted murder of senior Hells Angel Normand Hamel on April 17, 2000, by Rock Machine MC members, a longstanding HAMC-affiliated outlaw motorcycle club based in Laval, Quebec known as the Death Riders MC assimilated into a new chapter of the Rockers Motor Club which became known as Rockers MC North. Acting on behalf of the Hells Angels, this newly-formed support charter oversaw the drug trade in Laval as well as the lower Laurentides region in Southwestern Quebec.

== Dissolution and legacy ==
There is wide speculation amongst journalists and law enforcement alike that much of the gang-related homicides that occurred during the notorious Quebec Biker War were committed by bikers who belonged to the Rockers Motor Club. It is alleged that nearly all of such individuals had been driven by the desire to "prove their worth" to the Hells Angels MC - hoping to be admitted as "full-patch" members.

The majority of Rockers MC members were arrested by the Quebec authorities in 2001 following a massive law enforcement crackdown involving the RCMP, Sûreté du Québec, Ontario Provincial Police and the Service de police de la Ville de Montréal known as "Operation Springtime". This, in turn, caused the gang to disband for good.

In 1998, gang hitman Aime Simard testified against five Rockers MC bikers before he was sentenced to life imprisonment on three counts of second-degree murder along with other criminal offenses. Several years later, he was founded stabbed to death in his prison cell on July 18, 2003, while incarcerated at Saskatchewan Penitentiary in Prince Albert.

Rockers member Dany Kane committed suicide in his garage though the use of carbon monoxide gasses from his car's exhaust system in August 2000.

== List of Rockers MC members ==
- Gregory "Picasso" Woolley
- Jean-Guy Bourgouin
- Dany "Dany Boy" Kane
- Aimé "Ace" Simard
- Stéphane "Godasse" Gagné
- Francis Boucher
- Sébastien "Bass" Beauchamp — Joined up with the Rockers in 1997 and became a full-patch member in 2000. Received a seven-year prison sentence following Operation Springtime. Fatally shot in December 2018 by freelance contract killer Frédérick Silva.
- Robert Johnson
- Stéphane Sirois
- René "Balloune" Charlebois
- Serge "Pacha" Boutin
- Normand "Norm" Robitaille
- Kenny Bedard
- Daniel Lanthier
- Guillaume "Mimo" Serra
- Pierre "Pépé" Provencher
- Sylvain Laplante
- Normand "Pluche" Bélanger
- Paul "Schtrompf" Brisebois
- Pierre "Peanut" Laurin
- Stephen Falls
- Bruno Lefebvre — Sentenced to 11 years in prison for conspiracy to commit murder, drug trafficking and gangsterism following Operation Springtime. Assassinated in 2013.
