= Aimé Simard =

Canadian contract killer who worked for the Hells Angels

- Born: 1968; Quebec City, Quebec, Canada
- Died: 18 July 2003 (aged 34–35); Saskatchewan Penitentiary, Prince Albert No. 461, Saskatchewan, Canada
- Other name: "Ace" Simard
- Occupation: Hells Angels contract killer turned police informant.

Aimé Simard (1968 – 18 July 2003) was a Canadian outlaw biker and hitman. He was a member of the Montreal-based Rockers Motor Club, a support club for the Hells Angels. He operated on the side as a contract killer, working for the Hells Angels and other organized crime groups in Canada. He would later turn crown witness and inform on his club. The Rockers operated from 1992/mid-2000s out of Montreal, Quebec, Canada.

== Simard's life ==
Aimé Simard was born in Quebec City, Quebec, Canada, and was said to be a strongly built individual, who was known to act as the tough guy. Simard had studied accounting, management and police administration in university with the aim of becoming a policeman. The bodybuilder Simard had an extensive record for petty crime-having 80 convictions for such offenses as shoplifting, theft and writing bouncing cheques, which precluded a police career. After going to prison for uttering death threats, Simard moved to Montreal. However, although Aimé Simard acted as if he was a straight man, he secretly had a male lover on the side. The man, Dany Kane, was also a contract killer for the Hells Angels group and the two were able to work together on a number of occasions. Kane was a member of the Rockers, the Hells Angels' puppet club in Montreal and hoped to be promoted up to be a Hells Angel.The relationship was kept quiet because Dany Kane had a wife and two kids at home.

In November 1996, Simard began a relationship with Kane. Simard had met Kane via an online gay dating service. As Simard's mother was in Florida on vacation, Simard took Kane to his mother's house, where the two men had sex in the whirlpool. Kane, who was only a Rocker, lied to Simard by saying he was a Hells Angel while Simard lied to Kane by saying he had gone to prison for trying to kill a policeman. Kane sponsored Simard into the Rockers. Simard was the complete opposite of Kane, being described as reckless and out of control while Kane was a control freak. As Kane was senior to Simard in the Rockers, the latter had to serve as his chauffeur, though Simard was a poor driver who twice caused accidents that smashed up Kane's cars.

In outlaw biker clubs, those members at the hang-around and prospect levels serve as virtual slaves to the full patch members, being at their beck and call, and expected to do whatever they are asked to do by the full patch members. Simard often stayed with Kane and his wife, who had no idea of their true relationship. Most notably, Kane who worked as an informer for the RCMP, used Simard to drive him to his meetings with RCMP handlers. The journalists Julian Sher and William Marsden wrote that Kane "seemed to view Simard as a goofy sort of toy-somebody he could play with or employ as the need arose".

== Murders in 1997 ==
In early February 1997, Simard shot a drug dealer who owed the Rockers money and his girlfriend in Quebec City. Both were severely injured. In February 1997, Aimé Simard and Dany Kane drove from Quebec to Halifax, in order to murder a businessman and drug dealer who owed the club money. The pair were ordered by Nomad David "Wolf" Carroll to kill Robert MacFarlane. MacFarlane was known to be a trouble-maker who was constantly getting into bar fights and was described by one Halifax policeman as: "If you were walking a beat downtown and you saw Bob MacFarlane, you knew within hours you'd be called to that bar. Very obnoxious, very loud, very much full of himself". Another policeman stated that Carroll had put a $25,000 contract on McFarlane's life "because he was such an asshole". Carroll had been the president of the Angels' Halifax chapter from 1984 to 1990, and after he moved to Montreal, he remained closely involved in the operations of the Halifax chapter. Carroll had a low opinion of the Halifax chapter as a "bunch of Boy Scouts" except for chapter president Mike McCrea, and regularly went back to Halifax to monitor operations.

On their way to Halifax, Simard and Kane were pulled over by the RCMP under the suspicion of smuggling drugs; though no drugs were found, it caused a "silent hit" on the RCMP's computers, which alerted officers whenever an informer has contact with the police, which led them to become curious about what Kane was doing in New Brunswick. On 27 February 1997, Kane and Simard followed MacFarlane from the security business he owned, the Spy Store, to an industrial park where he wanted to show off to some friends some antique cars he owned. MacFarlane had noticed he had been followed, and upon parking his car, got out to confront the two Rockers. Simard opened fire with a .38-calibre handgun and wounded MacFarlane who ran away, screaming. Simard got out of his car and followed MacFarlane, to shoot him in the neck while Kane fired two shots that missed. Kane deliberately missed so he could tell his RCMP handlers that he had not killed MacFarlane. Afterwards, Simard and Kane drove back to Montreal, only stopping to drop off their guns, clothing, and the stolen Nova Scotia license plates into a forest. Unknown to Kane and Simard, the security cameras at the warehouse had recorded the killing, but the grainy footage taken at night made identification difficult. This was Simard's first murder.

On 5 March 1997, Kane was asked by his RCMP handlers about Simard, whom he called "very unpredictable and dangerous...capable of anything". In the meantime, Simard murdered the principle eyewitness to the shooting he had done in February in Quebec City. On 28 March 1997, Simard killed Jean-Marc Caissy in Montreal. Simard later testified that the orders for the "hit" came from the Rocker president Gregory Woolley. Caissy of the Rock Machine was killed leaving a hockey area in Montreal, when Simard walked up to him, shot him in the head, and then paged his superior Pierre Provencher with the message text "555 357" to let him know the murder was done. Simard testified about his murders: "Killing them isn't everything. It has to be sickening, disgusting. You have to cut up their faces". Simard testified that he shot Caissy in the face five times at close range to mutilate his face.

Simard left the murder weapon, a Magnum handgun, at a locker at the Pro-Gym where it was found by a janitor, who reported the gun to the police. Ballistic tests showed the Magnum was the gun that had killed Caissy, which left the police wondering why Simard had left the gun at the gym instead of throwing it away. On 11 April 1997, Simard was arrested by the Service de police de la Ville de Montréal after he went back to the gym to retrieve his gun. After his arrest, Simard agreed to become a délateur (informer) and named all of the crimes he had committed, including the murder of McFarlane. Both Kane and Simard were charged with the murder of Mcfarlane. The government decided to take advantage of this opportunity and transformed Simard into their personal weapon; as a government witness. Simard decided to accept to betray the Rockers and Hells Angels, which made him a target for the Hells Angels group. The revelation that Kane had been involved in the murder of McFarlane caused a major crisis in inter-police relations, as the RCMP sought to protect their informer Kane.

== Becoming a police informant ==
Aimé Simard was facing a sentence of life in prison, so he accepted the police's offer to act as a police informant. Simard made a plea-bargain with the Crown, receiving 12 years in prison for one count of second-degree murder. Simard proved to be an inept witness on the stand. One judge, Félix Cacchione, said that Simard "displayed a cold-blooded remorseless and a manipulative personality while testifying" during Kane's trial for murdering MacFarlane in 1998. Likewise, the 1998 trial of the Rocker president Gregory Wooley for ordering Caissy's murder ended with Wooley's acquittal, as Simard proved to be a poor witness on the stand.

Because of the deal he struck, Simard was sentenced to life in prison with the possibility of parole after 12 years. The police also agreed to grant early parole, should Simard continue to cooperate with the police and testify against several other members of the Hell's Angel's gang. By agreeing to this deal and betraying the gang, Simard became a marked man. Simard expected retaliation from the Hells Angels group. Simard was quoted saying, "The other prisoners try to pick quarrels with me and I'm up against the correctional services bureaucracy." Because of his fear of retaliation, Simard asked for a new identity as part of his deal. While in prison, Simard was left alone in the general population, as a known police informant who betrayed his gang. Simard felt that even though he was a protected witness, his life was being put into danger every day. The police never fulfilled their promise of a new identity.

== Murder in prison ==
Simard had requested the transfer to Prince Albert Institution in Saskatchewan only a few months prior to his death in 2003. He thought that he would be safer from the Hells Angels associates in Saskatchewan than in British Columbia.

Simard reported that he felt like he was a hunted man in prison. On 18 July, Aimé Simard was found in his cell suffering from 187 puncture wounds. The attacker sharpened a metal rod to be used as a weapon. At the time of his death, Simard was scheduled to testify at a trial of another gang member. There was a blood trail which led the investigators to the cell next to Simard's which belonged to Alvin Starblanket.

An inmate told authorities that he had been present at a prison-yard meeting during which Starblanket accepted a $25,000 contract to go after Simard. The inmate reported that Christopher Cluney was present and participated in the murder. Anthony Tawiyaka, the inmate at the Prince Albert Institution, testified that he observed Starblanket and Cluney enter into Simard's cell, and that he saw Simard sit up after he had been stabbed.

Starblanket plead guilty to second-degree murder and was sentenced to life without parole for the first 13 years of his sentence. Starblanket's co-accused, Christopher Cluney, who was 33 at the time, was tried for first degree murder, but instead received a charge of second degree murder.
