= Face to Face (photograph) =

Photo taken in 1990 during the Oka Crisis

Komulainen's 1990 photograph of Patrick Cloutier (left) and Brad Larocque (right)

Face to Face is a photograph of Canadian Army soldier Patrick Cloutier and Ojibwe activist Brad Larocque staring each other down during the Oka Crisis. It was taken on September 1, 1990, by Shaney Komulainen, and has become one of Canada's most famous images.

== Events ==
Komulainen was working as a freelance photographer for The Canadian Press. On September 1, she had been assigned to the South Shore, the site of the Mohawk blockade of the Mercier Bridge. She heard on the radio that the Canadian Army was moving, and called to secure permission from Canadian Press manager Bill Grimshaw to go to the area known as "The Pines" where the photograph was taken.

When Komulainen saw the face-to-face confrontation, she was struck by Cloutier's face: "It just struck me that his face was so young. He was military, but he was so young." At least three warriors approached Cloutier in this time of confrontations. In video of the standoff, the voice of Larocque can be heard speaking to Cloutier: "Are you nervous? [...] Not scared, though, are you?" Komulainen recalls that Larocque explained to the man in front of him the sensation of a bullet entering the human body. The voice was later misidentified as belonging to Ronald "Lasagna" Cross who had featured prominently earlier in the dispute. Larocque, however, was speaking English and Cloutier, who spoke only French, understood none of the comments. Komulainen believes she shot between 20 and 25 frames of the pair, and passed along the film, before Bill Grimshaw drove it to the Canadian Press in Montreal, where he developed and printed it.

== Brad Larocque ==
At the time, Brad "Freddy Krueger" Larocque was studying at the University of Saskatchewan, but had made his way to Kanesatake earlier in the summer to support the Mohawk people. Despite the fact that Larocque's nickname is taken from the horror film character, Komulainen asserts that he was known to reporters as being soft-spoken. Larocque lived in Montreal for some time after the conflict, but later returned to Saskatchewan.

=== Mistaken identity ===
A similar image featuring Ronald "Lasagna" Cross, whose name was frequently used incorrectly to identify the masked man in Komulainen's photo.

Because Larocque's face was masked, his identity was sometimes mistakenly given as Ronald "Lasagna" Cross. "Lasagna" (whose real name was Ronaldo Casalpro) had been photographed engaging in a similar – though slightly more spaced – face-to-face confrontation with a different soldier. Cross/Casalpro died of a heart attack in November 1999, after completing his prison sentence for assault and weapons charges related to the conflict.

== Patrick Cloutier ==
Patrick Cloutier of Saint-Maxime-du-Mont-Louis, Quebec was a 19-year-old private with the Canadian Army's Royal 22nd Regiment at the time. After the photo was published, he was heralded as a Canadian hero. The Globe and Mail even compared Cloutier to "the man who stared down a Red Army tank in Beijing's Tiananmen Square last year." Quebec media emphasized Cloutier's "Quebecois roots", and La Presse described him as "the little soldier staring unblinkingly at the angry Warrior." Later that year, Cloutier was granted an "accelerated promotion" to master corporal.

In May 1992, Cloutier was demoted to private again and served 45 days in an Edmonton military prison for cocaine use. Cloutier served the Canadian military again during the war in Bosnia and Herzegovina, and upon his return to Canada, many of his friends from the service committed suicide. He was discharged on December 9, 1993, after being found guilty of impaired driving, leaving the scene of an accident, and causing bodily harm. Cloutier was convicted of ramming a double-parked car, injuring its two occupants and a 16-year-old passenger in Cloutier's own vehicle. In 1995, he appeared in a softcore pornographic film, Quebec Sexy Girls II: The Confrontation, which specifically parodied the events at Oka. As of 2015, he was working for the Canadian Coast Guard.

Cloutier would later insist that he had never supported the original cause of the conflict: a golf course. On the contrary, said Cloutier, "J'étais pour les Indiens ! Je passe beaucoup de temps au Nunavut et les Premières Nations, c'est mon peuple préféré." (I was for the Indians! I spent a lot of time in Nunavut and with First Nations, they're my favourite people.)

== Shaney Komulainen ==
Shaney Komulainen was 27 years old at the time the photograph was taken. Eight months later, Komulainen was severely injured when her car spun into a truck just outside Oka, where she was working on a follow-up story for Saturday Night. She suffered broken legs and brain injuries, which effectively ended her journalism career. While still in hospital from the accident, Komulainen was charged on four counts related to the Oka Crisis – including possession of and threatening with a weapon – but was acquitted of all charges at trial.

== Legacy ==
The photo became "the most recognizable image of the Oka Crisis." Zosia Bielski has described it as being "one of the few Canadian photos that comes close to being iconic" and Prof. Tracy Whalen says that "some have called it Canada's most famous image."

Photographer Rob Galbraith, who also shot the Oka Crisis (for Reuters) believes the photo is among the top five Canadian photos ever taken. Galbraith insists that "It’s the symbolism of it... This is the difference between a newswire photographer and a newspaper photographer. A news wire photographer tries to photograph an image that captivates and you don’t have to write a word for it, whereas a newspaper photographer will normally take photos that need a caption." Photographer Bill Grimshaw (who developed the photo) feels differently, believing that the photo was "a great photo for the day — but it really was theatre and says nothing about anything."

A study, published by Rima Wilkes and Michael Kehl in the academic journal Nations and Nationalism, examined the different ways Canadians have responded to the photograph. "People project onto this image what they want to see," says Rima Wilkes, "You can think it’s just a photograph and they don’t lie, but you can interpret it any way you want." Wilkes suggests that many non-Indigenous people see the photograph as symbolic of Canadian peacekeeping, a view she suggests is "misguided" given the events of the Oka Crisis and the overwhelming numerical dominance of the Canadian forces.

The image was used as a recruitment tool by the Canadian forces. The photograph frequently appears in Canadian media stories, only partially connected with the Oka Crisis, such as coverage of the Grand River land dispute. Indigenous activists continue to use the photograph to symbolize strength and resistance.
