= Dany Kane =

Canadian police informant and former Hell's Angels associate

- Born: 1969; L'Acadie, Quebec, Canada
- Died: 7 August 2000 (aged 30–31); Montreal, Quebec, Canada
- Other name: Dany Boy
- Occupations: Informant for the Royal Canadian Mounted Police and the Sûreté du Québec, associated with the Hells Angels
- Allegiance: Condors MC (1985–1990); Rockers MC (1994–2000); Demons Keepers MC (1994)

Dany "Dany Boy" Kane (1969 – 7 August 2000) was a Canadian criminal who was a compliant police informant at the same time. Kane worked for the Royal Canadian Mounted Police (RCMP) as an informant inside the Hells Angels for many years, and provided information to the police on the Hells Angels. Kane was found dead of an apparent suicide in the garage of his suburban Montreal home in the summer of 2000.

== Early life ==
Born in L'Acadie, Quebec (now Saint-Jean-sur-Richelieu, Quebec), as a child Kane was brought up by caring relatives, attended private school and Boy Scouts, and went on many expensive vacations. Kane's father, Jean-Paul Kane, was a bricklayer, while mother Gemma Brideau was a housewife. Kane's family was poor, but respectable. To save money, Kane's parents sent him away to live with an uncle, which damaged Kane's self-esteem. Kane was a loner who disliked revealing his feelings and always felt out of place. Germain Godin, the owner of a local grocery store who employed Kane as a teenager, recalled: "He was always very polite, a good employee. He was easy to deal with. It was a good family". In 1983, Kane met and started to date a 13-year-old girl, known under the pseudonym of Josée as she does not want her real to be known, who later became his wife.

He grew up discontented with his life and wanted recognition in a bike gang in Quebec. Kane was a restless student who was incapable of sitting still in class. When he was 16 he left school and took whatever work he could get. Robert Guimard, the neighbor of his parents, introduced him to motorcycles and not long after he fell into the biker fraternity life of strip clubs run by the bikers in the small towns around Montreal. Ever since the 1960s, there has been an outlaw biker subculture in Quebec, and Kane embraced it as a way of rejecting the values of his working-class family. Josée reported from his teenage years onward Kane had wanted to join an outlaw biker club, with the Hells Angels being his first choice. In June 1990, Josée gave birth to the first of Kane's children, a son named Benjamin.

== Criminal life ==
Kane's first crime was a break-and-enter when he was seventeen. By the age of eighteen, Kane joined a small biker gang based in St-Hubert named the Condors led by Patrick Lambert. While working for the Condors he earned around $700 a week making sure dealers had the product they needed. The Condors merged with a Hells Angels puppet group known as the Evil Ones, but Kane resented having to prove himself again to a new set of bikers and decided to branch out and sell drugs, guns, and cigarettes on his own. From 1990 to 1992 he was making $3000 a week from drug trafficking and sold between thirty and fifty guns and accessories.

Kane was very active as a gun-runner, buying illegal guns smuggled in from the United States via the Kahnawake Mohawk reserve, which straddles the border between Quebec and New York state, and is one of the main smuggling routes between Montreal and New York City. Kane sold guns to anyone who asked and had enough money. Between 1990 and 1992, Kane sold at least 50 guns, which were mostly handguns or machine guns, with an average profit of $300-$400 per gun sold. Kane's wife, Josée, grew increasingly unhappy over the summer of 1992 with the criminals that her husband kept bringing home as she told him that his friends were disreputable, dishonest and dangerous. Two of Kane's friends, Martin Giroux and Eric Baker, validated his wife's concerns by stealing 20 of his illegal guns with the intention of selling the stolen arms themselves.

In September 1992, Kane and two other men nearly beat two men to death. Kane shot Baker in the legs, saying this was punishment for stealing his guns. During the beating he accidentally shot Baker in the head. Baker was left for dead in a sandpit, but was able to crawl his way to a farmhouse despite his wounds. Kane was convicted of conspiracy to murder, kidnapping, assault, illegal use of a firearm and possession of a gun with the serial number filed off. He was given a 25-month sentence of which he only served ten months in prison and another five in a transition home.

== MC membership ==
=== Puppet Clubs ===
Kane was a member of the outlaw motorcycle groups known as the Condors, the Rockers, and the Demon Keepers, all of which were the puppet clubs of the Hells Angels. He had ties to Maurice Boucher, the biggest name in the Canadian Hells Angels. When his business began to suffer because he did not belong to a group, Kane approached two members of the Hells Angels, Walter Stadnick and David "Wolf" Carroll, with hope that they could get him into the Hells Angels. After a year passed, with Kane doing what he thought was slave labour without being invited to the MC, he became annoyed with Stadnick and Carroll for not getting him into the MC. The Hells Angels is a hierarchical organization that requires recruits start in a puppet club. If they do well, they graduate to the title of hang around, where they can't wear the patch but are considered an associate. Next, they become a prospect, where they get a half patch that shows the chapter's title. If they continue to perform well, they become a full patch member and get the Winged Death Head emblem. Kane had to work as a bodyguard and a chauffeur to Carroll and Stadnick; as a "mule" delivering drugs, prostitutes and guns; and paying for all their meals and drinks at restaurants and bars, in hope that he would be promoted up the ranks as a reward. Kane was considered to be a likeable and intelligent character whose only major weakness was sex as he bragged incessantly to anyone who would listen about the size of his penis and his sexual prowess with the opposite sex. Kane kept his bisexuality a closely guarded secret as homophobia is rampant within the outlaw biker subculture.

=== Demon Keepers ===
Kane was upset because he had worked with the gang for several years and was not even considered a hang around. Kane's luck then changed. Kane was "recruited by David (Wolf) Carroll and Walter (Nurgent) Stadnick to preside over three chapters of an Ontario puppet club called the Demon Keepers. Stadnick was unhappy about the way that the Ontario biker gangs such as Satan's Choice, the Loners, and the Para-Dice Riders all refused his offers to join the Hells Angels, and in the fall of 1993 decided to several members of the Rockers and other puppet gangs move to Ontario to set up a new puppet gang.

Stadnick wanted chapters to be set up in Toronto, Cornwall, Ottawa, and Niagara Falls to flood the Ontario market with cheap cocaine that would force the other Ontario gangs to join the Hells Angels. The fact that Johnny Papalia, the long time boss of the Papalia family who hated outlaw bikers was ailing from health problems, left Toronto open to the Hells Angels by 1994. Toronto had a number of 'Ndrangheta clans such as the Coluccio, DeMaria, Tavernese, Figliomeni, Ruso, Racco and Commisso clans, but the way that the Toronto 'Ndrangeta was divided into seven clans limited their ability to oppose the Hells Angels.

Stadnick chose Kane to the president of the Demon Keepers puppet gang. The Demon Keepers were founded in a party at the Hells Angels Montreal chapter's clubhouse on 29 January 1994 and later the same day Kane and his gang rode out to Toronto. Kane also unveiled the Demon Keepers patch, which he had designed himself. The journalist Jerry Langton described the patch as a chain made up of assault rifles circling what appeared to be a badly drawn portrait of "Bela Lugosi as Dracula". The majority of the members of the Demon Keepers were in Langton's view "an array of South Shore tough guys, some of whom had already been discarded by the Evil Ones". Kane together with the other members chosen for the Demon Keepers could barely speak English, which presented major problems in Ontario as most Ontarians could not understand what they were trying to say. Kane chose as the Demon Keepers' clubhouse an expensive apartment on Eglinton Avenue in Toronto. Kane's choice of a clubhouse made it impossible to set up surveillance cameras and the problems with limited parking in Toronto made it difficult for people to visit the clubhouse.

The plan did not work out because Carroll was a serious alcoholic and never had money to support the gang which meant they could not intimidate drug dealers in cities such as Ottawa, Cornwall, and Toronto. Kane had the Demon Keepers ride through small towns like Belleville in attempts to pressure local drug dealers to buy from the Demon Keepers. Kane planned to take on the Outlaws, later writing in a confession to his police handlers: "While we were there, we put together several murder plots to eliminate the Outlaws. We slapped surveillance on them and the bars they frequented". The Demon Keepers during their short existence from January to April 1994 failed to make a single drug sale in Ontario.

Kane called the Demon Keepers a gang of "no-talent imbeciles" while Carroll was often too drunk to lend him support and Stadnick was attempting to persuade the Satan's Choice and Para-Dice Riders gangs to "patch over" to become Hells Angels. Kane came to suspect that the Demon Keepers were just a ploy by Stadnick to apply pressure on Satan's Choice and the Para-Dice Riders to "patch over" to the Hells Angels, making him feel rather used.

=== Arrest ===
On April 1, 1994, Kane was arrested in Belleville, Ontario for having two handguns in his car, and spent the next four months in prison. Once Kane was arrested Stadnick shut down the Demon Keepers. During his time in the Quinte Detention Centre in Belleville, Kane realized that he was bisexual after he had sex with another prisoner, which left him with the intense desire to have more homosexual experiences after he discovered that he enjoyed having sex with men. Kane also felt that Stadnick had set him up to fail with the Demon Keepers, and he wanted revenge by becoming a police informer.

After Kane was released from prison for his April 1994 weapons charges, he began to hate the Hells Angels. In July 1994, Kane started to associate with Scott Steinert, an American living in Montreal who was a "prospect" with the Hells Angels. Steinert planned to set up a Hells Angels chapter in Kingston once he was promoted up to a "full patch" Hells Angel and planned to have Kane move to Kingston with him. However, Carroll ordered Kane to rejoin the Evil Ones puppet gang, which Kane considered to be a major humiliation. Kane believed that the Hells Angels had used them and told one of his police handlers that he wanted revenge. Kane had become frustrated that he was still a member of the Rockers, the Hells Angels' puppet club in Montreal, and had not been promoted to become an Angel despite all of his work for the club.

=== Police Contact ===
On 17 October 1994, Kane contacted Staff-Sergeant Jean-Pierre Lévesque of the Royal Canadian Mounted Police to tell them he wanted to work as an informer. Kane's main contacts with the RCMP were Corporal Pierre Verdon and Sergeant Gaetan St. Onge. Kane had his first meeting with Verdon on 4 November 1994. By December 1994 he told Corporal Verdon about all of the above happenings as well as the Hells Angels business connections with top members of the Italian mafia as well as their plans to form an elite group of bikers called the Nomads. Kane told Verdon that Boucher said that the new Nomad chapter was going to be "plus rock n' roll" (more daring, exciting, and harder-edged—more at liberty to act at will rather than according to club rules). Kane told the RCMP about the Hells Angels having twice sent him to meet Moreno Gallo and Tony Mucci (members of the Italian mafia) to discuss drug trafficking. Kane's reports gave unprecedented insight to the RCMP about how the inner echelon of the Hells Angels worked.

Kane had a secretive, manipulative personality as he thoroughly enjoyed power and maneuvering behind-the-scenes to play off people. Throughout the Quebec biker war, Kane enjoyed the power as the only senior informer within the Hells Angels gave him over his RCMP handlers and his ability to halt the schemes of Hells Angels leaders such as Boucher by informing on them. Detective Benoît Roberge of the Service de police de la Ville de Montréal who worked as Kane's handler in 1999-2000 stated that Kane was shaped by growing up in small town L'Acadie instead of the working class urban criminal milieu that most Quebec Hells Angels came from. Roberge stated: "In that milieu, maybe Kane didn't have the criminal roots to say, 'Me, I'll never talk to the cops'. Because for many bikers, it's almost like a religion, it's so strong. What Kane did have was a James Bond side to him, a sense of adventure". Kane warned his RCMP handlers to be careful with sharing the intelligence collected by him with the Sûreté du Québec, which he described as being systemically corrupt, and also with the police forces of Greenfield Park and Brossard. Kane reported that the Hells Angels had photographs of most of the Rock Machine members via police records.

The Canadian journalist Daniel Sanger wrote that much of the RCMP's relationship with Kane was questionable from a legal viewpoint as Kane continued to be involved in murders and bombings while working as an informer, which was a violation of the RCMP's rules. Sanger wrote: "It's conceivable that Verdon, St. Onge and Kane had agreed, explicitly or otherwise, to a 'don't ask, don't tell' policy. Not only would the Mounties have been contravening the force's regulations but breaking the law themselves had they known that Kane was involved in bombings or any other serious criminal activity".

== Informant years ==
Kane's first stint as an informant lasted from 1994 to 1997 where he collected a total of $250,000.

=== The seizure of the mini-vans ===
On 19 December 1994, Kane took his police handlers on a guided tour of the hidden bomb factories for the Hells Angels located in various houses, apartments and offices throughout Montreal, Sorel and the South Shore. Due to Kane's information, which was passed on to the Montreal police, two weeks later the police seized two parked mini-vans that had been turned into drivable bombs that were each full of 50 sticks of dynamite. Both mini-vans were intended to kill Rock Machine members and St. Onge wrote: "This seizure saved lives".

=== Murder of Normand Baker ===
On 4 January 1995, Normand Baker, a member of the Rock Machine, was murdered in Acapulco, Mexico by a Hells Angel, François Hinse, who shot him in a bar. Hinse wished Baker "Bonne Année!" as he sat at a Hard Rock Cafe inside a luxury resort, shot him dead and then jumped though a plate-glass window. The "Hollywood dramatics" of jumping though the plate glass window led to Hinse injuring himself as he was only wearing a bathing suit and he was found bleeding on the lawn of the resort. Kane informed the RCMP that Boucher had bribed the Acapulco police to have Hinse freed and on 15 January 1995 Hinse was indeed freed. Verdon wrote: "Mexico has informed us of the liberation of Hinse despite all the evidence. It's a clear case of corruption...We understand that the HA [Hells Angels] invested a million Mexican pesos to buy the Mexican authorities. Events have proved C-2994 [Kane] right and once again demonstrated the reliability and importance of our source". Kane reported that a Mexican policeman had told Boucher that he should have contracted out the murder of Baker to a Mexican hitman instead of sending down a Canadian Hells Angel to kill Baker. The policeman told Boucher that a good Mexican hitman could be hired for CA$500, which was far cheaper than the bribe he had to pay the Acapulco police to free Hinse.

In March 1995, Kane's cover was almost blown when Boucher was arrested for carrying a handgun, and an officer with the Sûreté du Québec told him that the RCMP had a "coded informer" whose number was C-2994 working within the ranks of the Angels. Kane reported: "After some hard thinking, Mom [Boucher] reached the conclusion that it could be one of six people". Boucher concluded that the informer could only be Steinert; two Rockers; a Hells Angel supporter; or Kane. Kane stated that he felt "very nervous" because "he was the least known to Boucher and therefore...was the main suspect". Steinert told Boucher that his concerns were merely "babble", but Boucher was convinced there was an informer.

Kane was temporarily saved when the Hells Angels hitman Serge Quesnel turned informer after his arrest in April 1995, which led to the conclusion being reached in the Hells Angels that he was the "coded informer". However, Boucher dismissed this theory, noting that Quesnel was only a low-level hitman working for the Trois-Rivières chapter president Louis Roy, and that the informer would have had to have been someone more high ranking than him. Boucher noted that the police had seized two mini-vans fitted out with dynamite, which led him to the conclusion that the police had been forewarned as he deduced that the police could not have discovered by accident two dynamite-packed mini-vans parked on different streets on the same day.

=== The Carroll-Steinert feud ===
At the same time, Kane was caught up between a power struggle between Carroll and Scott Steinert. Kane reported that Carroll and Steinert hated each other. Kane told his police handlers: "I like that-working for two guys. Working for two Hells, that allows me to skate between both of them". The journalists Julian Sher and William Marsden wrote Kane had placed himself in a dangerous position within the Carroll-Steinert feud as: "Riding the power plays within the Hells Angels is like trying to master the twisting schemes of ambitious-and sometimes psychotic-medieval princes. A wrong move could get you killed".

Kane described Steinert to his police handlers as the most aggressive and ruthless of the Angels and as Boucher's right-hand man as he made more money than any of the other Angels. Likewise, Kane described Carroll as a raging bully with an extremely bad temper and a propensity for violence. When Carroll asked Kane to drive him to Halifax in March 1995, Steinert refused to allow it and the two men almost came to blows over the issue. Shortly afterwards Kane was almost exposed as an informer when he mentioned that he had been present when one of Steinert's men, Richard Lock, together with a Mafiosi had beaten up the owner of the Crescent Bar in Montreal for refusing to pay protection money plus the 10% take on daily sales the Hells Angels and the Mafia expected from all bar and restaurant owners in Montreal. A Montreal police detective later accused Lock of beating up the owner of the Crescent Bar, which led Lock to believe it was Kane who was the informer.

In April 1995, Sergeant St. Onge was approached by a Montreal police detective who wanted to know who informer C-2994 was, and was so persistent in demanding the identity of C-2994 that St. Onge suspected he had been bribed by the Hells Angels, a suspicion later confirmed when the detective was arrested for taking bribes. As an informer, Kane-who was obsessed with sex-was noted for his odd behavior like calling St. Onge at about 2 am to say he just had sex with some stripper and then hand the phone over to have the stripper tell St. Onge about his sexual prowess.

=== Biker war ===
By April 1995 the Royal Canadian Mounted Police (RCMP) was paying Kane $2,000 a week. In May 1995, when Kane's wife, Josée gave birth to his son, Guillaume, Steinert served as the godfather to Kane's son. Kane's efforts to be on good terms with his two feuding patrons, Carroll and Steinert, caused him problems. Carroll wanted Kane to continue with the Evil Ones puppet gang while Steinert wanted to set up a new Hells Angels puppet gang in Kingston, Ontario with Kane to be the president. Kane's inability to choose between Carroll and Steinert led to neither scheme coming to fruition. Upon Steinert's advice, Kane left the Evil Ones and joined the Rockers Motorcycle Club, led by Gregory Woolley, a Haitian immigrant who seemingly had no issues with the working for the whites only Hells Angels. The Rockers were a Hells Angel puppet club, but were not like the other puppet clubs such as the Evil Ones and the Condors which merely replicated the work of the Hells Angels. Instead, the Rockers served as the enforcement unit for the Hells Angels, being divided into a "baseball team" for intimidation and assault and the "football team", which served as a death squad.

In August 1995, Kane reported it was Steinert who set off the bomb that killed 11-year-old Daniel Desrochers. Kane reported: "Since that day, Steinert no longer talked about the bombs he had ordered and never again spoke about using bombs. Steinert asked some of his crew what they thought of the bombing...When they told him that they thought the murderer should be liquidated, Steinert didn't respond and became very pensive". Sher and Marsden wrote Kane was sometimes self-serving in his reports to his RCMP handlers and he was a well known expert at building bombs, suggesting there was a possibility that it was him instead of Steinert who set off the bomb that killed Desrochers. Kane was an expert bomb-maker and at very least was a member of Steinert's bomb-making team instead of being the passive observer that he portrayed himself as.

Kane committed at least 11 murders from 1994 to 1997 during his time as the most highly placed RCMP informer in the Hells Angels. In September 1995, Kane was involved in the murder of a drug dealer, Stéphane Boire. In October 1995, Kane became a striker with the Rockers, which required him to pay a $1, 500 initiation fee and hand over 10% of his monthly criminal earnings to the club. On 9 November 1995 Kane told St. Onge that he was going to Thunder Bay to sell cocaine for Steinert to the local drug dealers as the price for cocaine in northern Ontario was $50,000/per kilo while in Montreal the price was $32,000/per kilo. Kane stated that Steinert was very keen to move into northern Ontario, which was so lucrative for selling cocaine.

Kane's double life also applied to his private life as he continued to live with his first wife Josée who also living with his future second wife Patricia (also a pseudonym as she does not wish for her name to be known). Kane lied to both women to explain his frequent absences as he maintained that his work required him to be away often. Patricia was also unaware that Kane was working for the Hells Angels. One of Kane's associates, Roland Labrasseur, first told Patricia in early February 1996: "How can you be with Dany when he's married with three kids?"

On 20 February 1996, Kane reported that Carroll had met Donald Stockford in Saint-Sauveur to discuss a plan to ship drugs from Montreal to the Golden Horseshoe (i.e. greater Toronto area). Kane reported: "Their goal was to take a big part of the Toronto drug market". On 23 February 1996, Kane reported to his handlers that his patron Steinet had been promoted up to a "full patch" Hells Angels despite the way that Boucher had considered expelling him in January 1996 and that Gerald Matticks, the boss of the West End Gang, which controlled the port of Montreal, had just imported 500 kilograms of cocaine from Columbia to sell to the Hells Angels. Kane reported that Labrasseur was working as chauffeur for Carroll and was planning to enter a cocaine treatment center." Kane reported: "It seems that Wolf [Carroll] is not happy with this situation because Labrasseur was entrusted with certain tasks by him and he has shown signs of weakness"." Kane, who was angry with Labrasseur for his telling his mistress that he was married, was told by his wife in late February 1996 that Labrasseur was one of his Hells Angels-linked friends that she approved of. Kane told her in response: "That's too bad because it's the last time you'll be seeing him".

On 3 March 1996, Kane killed Roland Labrasseur, a drug addict who had fallen behind in his debts to the Hells Angels by driving him out to the countryside south of Montreal, where he shot him in the head by a remote rural road. Kane was later to say in 2000 that he killed Labrasseur on Carroll's orders. Kane in his reports blamed the murder on a Hells Angels-linked drug dealer, Daniel Bouchard. By contrast, Kane's former mistress, Patricia, believed that he had killed Labrasseur. However, he managed to persuade her that he had not killed Labrasseur and he was going to divorce his wife as he insisted that she was his one true love. On 1 June 1996 Patricia moved in with Kane into a Montreal apartment. Only in 2000 did Kane confess that he killed Labrasseur, and through admitted that he buried Boire's body, he continued to deny that he killed him. Kane in his reports stated that Labrasseur was a former soldier in the Canadian Army who was an expert with explosives who had been building bombs for the Hells Angels. Kane was correct that Labrasseur had indeed served in the Canadian Army, but Verdon discovered from looking at his service records that he had no explosives training beyond learning how to throw a hand grenade. Sher and Marsden wrote that Labrasseur was "a sad character, a bit of a simpleton with a cocaine addiction" and that Kane's claims that he was an expert bomb-maker who built bombs set off by car alarms and pagers were fanciful at best. Kane appeared to be trying to blame Labrasseur for the bombings that he had himself had committed. Sher and Marsden wrote that Kane probably killed Boire despite the way that he continued to pin the blame on Bouchard, a man he clearly disliked.

Kane was active as a bomb-maker and he blew up the Green Stop restaurant in Châteauguay after the owner refused to pay protection money to the Hells Angels. Kane reported that Carroll together with a member of the Rizzuto family owned a bar in the town of St. Sauveur, which by 1997 had been so successful that Carroll had started building condos in St. Sauveur as it was "a great chance to launder a bit of money". On 3 May 1996, Kane told his handlers that Stockford had arranged for a drug courier to go Montreal to Toronto with one kilogram of cocaine; about 1, 000 ecstasy pills; and four kilograms of Hashish. In September 1996, Josée discovered that Kane was living in the same apartment as Patricia, which led her to file for divorce. On 29 November 1996, Kane wrote in a report that Stockford had a courier deliver 300 kilograms of hashish to Hamilton, and in another report in January 1997 stated that Stockford had sent another courier with 4 kilograms of cocaine to Oshawa. Kane had a wife and three children and was secretly a bisexual. His secret homosexual lover was Aimé Simard, who was murdered in 2003 in a Saskatchewan prison.

=== Magazine and Simard partnership ===
In July 1996, the RCMP gave Kane some $30,325 to set up a magazine Rencontres Selectes, a magazine catering to those looking for casual sex whose revenue came from ads for strippers, phone sex and prostitution. Kane launched a website to go along with his magazine, which catered to homosexuals looking for casual sex. Staff Sergeant St. Onge argued that it was necessary for the Mounties to subsidize Rencontres Selectes because "it means he [Kane] didn't have to commit serious crimes and thus could avoid getting arrested himself arrested or killed and could continue to feed us information". Sher and Marsden wrote: "So, the Royal Canadian Mounted Police got into the sex magazine trade. Taxpayers' money financed Kane's weekly magazine. The force laundered its investment through a bank and a notary". In 1997, Rencontres Selectes collapsed owing to a lack of sales.

Kane reported in the summer of 1996 that a conflict was brewing within the Hells Angels Montreal chapter with one faction loyal to Steinert and another to Stadnick, Stockford and Carroll. On 11 May 1996 at a party in Halifax, Steinert's bodyguard, Donald Magnussen, in a moment of drunken rage had killed David Boyko, a member of Winnipeg's los Brovos gang, whom Stadnick was trying to persuade to join the Hells Angels. The plans to have los Brovos join the Hells Angels were aborted for a number of years as los Brovos saw Boyko's murder as an act of treachery by Hells Angels. Kane reported that Stadnick and Carroll wanted Magnussen killed as Kane stated: "This, in effect, would be the only way to prove to other biker gangs in western Canada that the assassination of Boyko wasn't ordered by the Hells Angels". Kane reported that Caroll hired André "Toots" Tousiganat in May 1996 to kill Donald "Bam Bam" Magnussen, the bodyguard to Steinert, and was very unhappy that after five months that Tousigant had failed to act. In October 1996, Kane was offered $10,000 by Carroll, Stockford and Stadnick to kill Magnussen. Kane knew that Steinert would have him killed if he killed Magnussen, and to get out of the dilemma, asked his handlers to warn Magnussen his life was in danger. Roberge warned Magnussen that his life was in danger, but dismissed the warning as a police plot. Kane was saved when Boucher declared that since Magnussen was a full patch Hells Angel, only another full patch Angel could kill him, and not a Rocker like Kane. Kane reported that Boucher had declared as a Nomad president that Stadnick had to kill Magnussen. In February 1997, Magnussen beat up Leonardo Rizzuto, the son of the Mafia boss Vito Rizzuto outside of a bar on St. Laurent Boulevard. Kane reported that Vito Rizzuto was furious with Magnussen and wanted him dead.

In November 1996, Kane used his own website to meet Aimé Simard whom he recruited into the Rockers. Simard was living in Quebec City, but listed himself as living in Montreal. It remains unclear if the "sexually adventurous" Kane, who prided himself on having many girlfriends, was bisexual or bicurious. On their first date, the two men went to Simard's mother's house, where they had sex in the whirlpool. Both men lied to each other with Simard saying he had gone to prison for trying to kill a police officer (Simard had served a prison sentence for uttering death threats) while Kane claimed to be Hells Angel (Kane was only a Rocker). When Kane took off his clothes, Simard was impressed to see he had on his arm a tattoo that read "SS 81". The number 81 stood for HA (Hells Angels) as H is the eighth letter in the Latin alphabet while A is the first letter. In the Hells Angels, to wear the lightning bolt runes of the SS indicates that the wearer is a member of the "Filthy Few", the title awarded to those who have killed for the gang. The use of the SS lightning bolt runes as a symbol for murders is done both for the shock value and as a reflection of the fascistic, racist ideology of the Hells Angels, where Nazi Germany is idolized as a symbol of power and strength. Based on his prison experiences, Simard knew from Kane's tattoo that there was more to him than his claim to be a businessman who "invested money in bars and agencies". In response, Kane asked Simard: "How come you know this type of tattoo?" Simard then confessed that he was not just a university student, but he had gone to prison. In a bid to impress Kane, Simard lied about his criminal record for fraud, writing bad cheques and uttering death threats, and instead claimed he had been convicted of trying to kill a policeman. Kane then admitted that he was involved with the Hells Angels, but claimed to be a member of the Hells Angels proper instead of being the Rocker that he was.

Kane reported to his RCMP handlers in February 1997 that the Hells Angels had driven the Rock Machine out of its almost all of their former drug markets and the Hells Angels were set upon taking control of the Rock Machine's last strongholds of Pointe-St-Charles, Verdun, Lasalle, St-Henri, Lachine, Ville-Émard and Côte-St-Paul. Kane reported that the Rockers puppet gang had set up a death squad whose chief members were Gregory Woolley, Pierre Provencher, Normand Robitaille, Stephen Falls, and Stéphane Gagné. Kane added that the members of the death squad were to receive 30% of the profits from drug sales once the Hells Angels had taken control of the last Rock Machine drug markets. Kane reported that a drug dealer working for the Hells Angels known as Gros Mo ("Big Mo") was beaten up for also buying cocaine from the Rock Machine, but he omitted that Simard had nearly killed Gros Mo.

Unlike the control freak Kane, Simard was reckless and out of control. As Simard was junior to him in the Rockers, he had to serve as Kane's virtual slave, chauffeuring him around Montreal, through Simard was a poor driver who twice smashed up Kane's cars. Sher and Marsden wrote that Kane "seemed to view Simard as a goofy sort of toy-somebody he could play with or employ as the need arose". In February 1997, Kane and Simard were dispatched by Carroll to kill a drug dealer in Halifax named Robert MacFarlane. Carroll had been the president of the Angels' Halifax chapter from 1984 to 1990, and after moving to Montreal, he remained closely involved in the operations of the Halifax chapter, regularly going back to his hometown to inspect operations. MacFarlane was known to be a trouble-maker who was constantly getting into bar fights and was described by one Halifax policeman as: "If you were walking a beat downtown and you saw Bob MacFarlane, you knew within hours you'd be called to that bar. Very obnoxious, very loud, very much full of himself". Another policeman stated that Carroll had put a $25,000 contract on McFarlane's life "because he was such an asshole".

The fact that Simard kept wrecking successive vehicles presented problems about making the trip from Montreal to Halifax. Simard had wrecked his Jeep in a car clash in January 1997, then wrecked his Chrysler Intrepid in another clash, and finally he wrecked the car that he rented to replace his Intrepid. Simard was able to obtain a Buick LeSabre to replace his wrecked vehicles and in that car he drove Kane out to Halifax on 24 February 1997. Along the way to Halifax, Kane and Simard were pulled over in Oromocto, New Brunswick by the RCMP under the suspicion of smuggling drugs as the two men were dressed in such a flamboyant way that the two officers, Constables Gilles Blinn and Dale Hutley, thought they must be drug dealers. Kane and Simard co-operated with the two officers, but refused to allow them to open the trunk of their car, and lacking both probable cause and a warrant, the two officers did not search the car's trunk with the guns in it. The search caused a "silent hit" on the RCMP's computers as anytime a police officer contacts an informer it causes an alarm on the central computer system of the RCMP. However, the RCMP did not become overtly concerned about what Kane was doing in New Brunswick despite the fact that Kane had not mentioned to his handlers that he was going to Halifax.

On 27 February 1997, Kane and Simard killed MacFarlane in an industrial park in Halifax. MacFarlane had discovered his car was being followed by Kane and Simard and parked his car in the industrial park. MacFarlane got out to confront them while Simard shot him with a .38 handgun from the passenger's window As MacFarlane screamed in pain from his wound, he ran away while Simard and Kane both got of the car to give chase and finally gunned him down. On 11 March 1997, Kane told his handlers that: "Simard is very unpredictable and dangerous...He is capable of anything". Kane told his mistress Patricia around about the same time that Simard was "a real psychopath" and he regretted letting Simard live with them. Despite his statements, Kane spent the period from 15 to 22 March 1997 on vacation with Simard at the Trelawny Beach resort at Montego Bay in Jamaica. During the vacation, Simard told several other Hells Angels staying at the same resort that he applied several times to join the police, which was a major violation of the gang's rules, which state that anyone who had applied to be a policeman was not allowed to join.

St. Onge and Verdon had a new superior in the form of Staff Sergeant Pierre "Patame" Bolduc. Bolduc felt that much of Kane's information was useless as far as prosecuting Hells Angels was concerned and that the Mounties were paying exorbitant amounts of money for nothing. Bolduc wrote almost all of Kane's information about the Hells Angels politics and personalities was "bon à savoir" ("nice to know"), but did not provide the necessary evidence to lay criminal charges. Bolduc complained that the RCMP had paid C-2294 $2,000 per week plus $32,000 invested in his magazine and a $10,000 debt they had paid for him. On 28 March 1997, Simard killed a member of the Rock Machine, Jean-Marc Caissy, in Montreal and was arrested for the crime on 11 April 1997. Simard agreed to become a délateur (informer) after his arrest, and in his confession mentioned that he and Kane had killed MacFarlane. Simard also confessed that he had been Kane's lover, which came as a revelation to Kane's handlers who never suspected their relationship. Simard felt much guilt about having to testify against Kane for his role in MacFarlane's murder. Simard blamed Kane for drawing him into the world of the Hells Angels, but at the same time he was deeply in love with him. On 20 April 1997, Simard tried to commit suicide in his jail cell, saying he would rather kill himself than send Kane to prison. Despite Simard's devotion to him, Kane disparaged him in his reports to his RCMP handlers after his arrest as he stated: "In the milieu no one is taking Simard very seriously anymore because he is a liar who will be easy to discredit". Kane used a French expression "flottant dans l'huile" ("floating in oil", i.e. "doing splendidly") to describe the state of affairs in the Hells Angels, but also used another French expression "le savon est chaud" ("the soap is hot", i.e. trouble is brewing).

== Trial ==
With pressure in Montreal from the newly formed federal-provincial Wolverine bike squad and the recent arrest of his partner, Simard, on an unrelated murder charge, Kane would be brought into custody by the Nova Scotia RCMP for 18 months but would then be released due to the RCMP's contradictory evidence.

=== Police threats ===
Two RCMP officers from Halifax, Sergeant G.A. Barnett and Constable Tom Townsend arrived in Montreal to ask that Kane be extradited to Halifax to face charges of first degree murder for the killing of MacFarlane, and first learned that Kane was the RCMP's main informer within the Hells Angels. The RCMP went out of its way to protect Kane as an internal memo noted "the disclosure...has the potential to cause significant negative media attention". The RCMP was especially keen to protect Kane because Gilles Mathieu of the Nomad chapter had declared his willingness to sponsor Kane as a "hang-around" with the Nomad chapter, which is what Kane's handlers had long wanted.

To keep him from being questioned by the Wolverine squad, the RCMP arrested Kane on 30 April 1997 and sent him to Halifax. In Halifax, Constable Townsend tried to force him to confess to MacFarlane's murder by threatening to reveal he had been an informer, and to forestall that threat, Kane informed Carroll that Townsend was accusing him of being an informer, portraying it as an attempt by the Crown to force him to confess by falsely tagging him as an informer. St. Onge stated: "He was very smart. He knew Carroll had been accused of murder in Halifax and that the police had tried a similar ploy with him. And so he also knew that Carroll would understand and pass the word to the others that Kane was not talking".

Kane was thrown into a moment of panic in August 1997 when Simard accused him of being an informer as he noted that the police knew where he had hidden a gun after shooting a man in Quebec City and the only person whom Simard had told about the location of the gun was Kane. However, Simard was widely considered to be delusional and a pathological liar, and the Hells Angels put little attention to his allegations. Verdon wrote on 19 August 1997: "C-2994 [Kane] is confused and doesn't know anymore what to do. He asks what is the possibility of cooperating with us at the same time specifying that he does not want, under any circumstances to cooperate with the Sûreté du Québec." Kane used the fact that he was held in a Halifax jail awaiting charges of first-degree murder to rebut Simard's allegations that he was an informer as he told the other Hells Angels that an informer would not be denied bail. Kane complained that during his time in the Halifax jail that neither of his feuding patrons, Steinert or Carroll, could be bothered to visit him. Kane frequently called his wife Patricia or former wife Joséé from his jail to complain about jail life to the former while berating the latter as a poor mother to his children.

=== French-language trial ===
The French-Canadian Kane insisted on his constitutional right to have his trial in French, which delayed the proceedings as the Crown had to find a French-speaking judge, jury and Crown Attorney for his trial in Halifax. Kane's trial which began on 13 October 1998 was a farce as the judge Félix Cacchione ruled the pull-over in Oromocto was not warranted and ruled the evidence from it as inadmissible such as the computer search done by Blinn, through he did rule that Blinn could testify that he identified Kane in a police line-up as the man he had pulled over in Oromocto. Simard was the main witness for the Crown, but to confirm his story required that Blinn and Hutley confirm that Kane was the man they had pulled over with Simard. During the trial, various police officers gave conflicting testimony about whatever Blinn and Hutley had picked Kane out of a police line-up on 6 May 1997 or not.

During his time in custody for a murder that he would be acquitted for, the RCMP would drop Kane as an informant. On 18 December 1998, Judge Cachione who become notably annoyed with the confusing and contradictory statements from various policemen about whether Blinn and Hutley had picked Kane out of a line-up or not, threw the entire case out, saying the Crown's conduct had been so "egregious" that it would violate Kane's rights under the Charter of Rights and Freedoms to have the trial continue. Some of the detectives with the Montreal police believed that the RCMP deliberately sabotaged the trial to protect Kane.

=== Agent source ===
On 8 August 1999, Detective Benoît Roberge of the Service de police de la Ville de Montréal approached Kane about working as an agent source informer (i.e. an informer with signed contract committing the Crown to pay a certain sum of money in exchange for testifying in court). On August 23, 1999, a Montreal Urban Community Police Detective named Benoit Roberge talked with Kane. In a few months time after that date, Kane would be under contract with the Surete du Quebec as an agent source, and not just an informant. This meant he had to detail everything he did with the Hells Angels, communicate with Roberge a few times a week, and testify about the things he did with the Hells Angels.

In a 30-page contract Kane made with the police, he would have made upwards of $2 million and the total cost of his operation, including witness relocation and overtime and operating expenses for police handlers would have been over $8.6 million. Kane "kept them informed about what the top bikers in his circle were up to: where they were travelling; whom they were talking to; who had murdered whom and who was next; the Hells’ war plans against their Quebec rivals, the Rock Machine; their expansion plans into Ontario and Manitoba; and weapons and explosives purchases." Kane reported that the la messe ("the mass") as mandatory meetings for the Rockers were known were always presided over by a Nomad and every Rocker had to provide 10% of his earnings from crime to the Hells Angels. Kane stated that la messe were held at motels, and the members only learned of them the day before when a Rocker would hand out business cards with the name of the motel and the room that they were to meet.

== Mersereau Murders ==
In the fall of 1999, Kane again become involved with murder plots initiated by Carroll.

=== Randy Mersereau ===
A former Hells Angel in Halifax named Randy Mersereau had broken away to form his own gang, and was reported to have put out contracts on the lives of Carroll, Boucher and Mike McCrea, the president of the Angels' Halifax chapter as a prelude to joining the Bandidos. On 22 September 1999, Kane mentioned to Roberge that he was going to Halifax to kill Mersereau for Carroll, saying "He told me to get a gun. We're going there [Halifax], I don't known when we're coming back, but bring a gun". On 23 September 1999, the Angels bombed the car ownership owned by Mersereau in Truro, injuring 7 people including Mersereau. Kane's assassin assignment presented a challenge for his handlers since if he was allowed to kill Mersereau, that would make them accessories to murder, or if he did not, then the Angels might suspect he was working for the police.

To solve the problem, it was agreed that Kane would drive Carroll to Halifax, but on 24 September, as prearranged, the Sûreté du Québec pulled over Kane outside of Rivière-du-Loup for speeding. The patrolmen found in Kane's car a .38 handgun belonging to Kane and a machine gun belonging to Carroll. Both men were charged with violating gun control laws. However, Randy Mersereau was last seen alive on 31 October 1999 and his car was found abandoned on the highway between Halifax and Truro. On 3 November 1999, Kane told Roberge that Carroll had sent a new team of assassins from Montreal to Halifax, who seized Mersereau from his car on the evening of Halloween, killed him with a 9 mm machine gun and buried him in a forest in the interior of Nova Scotia. Mersereau's skeleton was not discovered until December 2010.

In January 2000, Roberge reported that Kane was suffering from depression, stating: "The source is going through a phrase where he is not motivated and is rethinking his personal life". Kane had to work 18-hour days, meeting with his handlers at 7 am, and spent most of his days working as a chauffeur and bodyguard to the Nomad Normand Robitalle. In February 2000, Kane was temporarily suspended from the Rockers after he was $3,000 in arrears relating to unpaid membership dues. That same month, Kane was forced to take on a $130,000 drug debt run up by the Nomad Denis Houle. In February 2000, Kane unleashed a tirade on Carroll recorded by the wire he was wearing as spoke with much anger: "It's been ten years, ten years that I've been around the Hells Angels. Fuck, that's a long time. But it changes nothing, it counts for nothing. Wolf, nothing you do counts". On 10 March 2000, Kane signed a confession listing all of his various crimes as part of his agent source contract. In his confession, Kane finally admitted that he killed MacFarlane in 1997, writing that a Halifax businessman named Paul Wilson had hired the Hells Angels to kill MacFarlane and that in turn the contract was passed on to him and Simard.

=== Kirk Mersereau ===
After his murder, the leadership of the Mersereau gang passed on to his younger brother, Kirk Mersereau, who vowed to avenge his brother. On 31 March 2000, Kane told Roberge that Carroll was planning to kill Kirk Mersereau in the near-future.

In April 2000, Kane went to Toronto on Carroll's orders to meet the leaders of the Para-Dice Riders gang for another of Carroll's murder plots. Kane in a report stated that Carroll wanted him to kill Gennaro Raso, the president of the Loners Motorcycle Club, as part of a bid to have the Para-Dice Riders join the Hells Angels. On 19 April 2000, Kane met in Toronto several Para-Dice Riders to discuss who he was to kill to Toronto besides for Raso. Kane reported that Carroll had devised a plan under which Kane would use his bomb-making skills to build a powerful bomb to destroy the Loners' clubhouse in Woodbridge with the aim of killing the entire gang. Kane sabotaged his mission by encouraging the Para-Dice Riders under the influence of alcohol to speak very loudly in public at a Toronto bar about the murder plot, which led Carroll to declare with disgust that the Para-Dice Riders were "idiots" as now the murder plot could not go forward.

On 25 June 2000, Kane was ordered by Caroll to go to Halifax at once, and the next day he met Carroll in a McDonald's in Truro. On 7:14 pm on 26 June, Kane phoned Roberge to say: "Carroll wants to kill Randy's brother". Later that evening, Kane went to the Angels' Halifax clubhouse to meet Carroll and McCrea who agreed that Jeff Lynds, a follower in the Mersereau gang would kill his leader in exchange for being made a prospect with the Hells Angels and Kane would help him. Kane's handlers were desperately thinking of way to stop the murder plot without compromising Kane's cover, but on 30 June 2000, Mersereau was injured in a car accident, which led to the plot being cancelled. On 10 September 2000, Kirk Mersereau and his wife Nancy were murdered execution-style in their farmhouse outside of Halifax. The Nova Scotia RCMP had have expressed much anger that neither the Sûreté du Québec or the Service de police de la Ville de Montréal ever shared Kane's information about the plots against the Mersereau brothers with them as Kane's information was only made public in 2003 during a trial in Montreal.

== Death ==
In the first half of 2000, Kane often worked as a chauffeur for Normand Robitaille, a member of the elite Nomad chapter. During his chauffeur duties, Robitaille left a briefcase in the car and Kane photographed all of the documents in the briefcase. The documents, which were in code, turned out to be the records of the Nomad "bank" detailing how much money each member of the Nomads brought to the Hells Angels. However, the documents that Kane photographed were in a code that police could not decipher along with a number of cryptic names. A drug dealing Montreal couple, Raymond Craig and his Bolivian wife, Sandra Antelo, sold cocaine from Bolivia to the Nomad chapter in the late 1990s. On 29 August 2000, the Hells Angels killed Raymond Craig which eventually led to Sandra Craig turning Crown's evidence. After living in hiding for several months, Sandra Craig turned herself in to the Montreal police on 24 January 2001, and explained the code to the financial records that Kane had photographed the previous year. The records that Kane stole and Craig explained, which listed someone codenamed as "Gertrude" who had sold $10,158,110 in cocaine for the Hells Angels in 1999–2000, was revealed to be Stadnick. Kane's information led the police in 2000 to a man the Angel records called "Boueuf", who turned out to be Gerald Matticks, the boss of the West End Gang. Kane revealed that Elias Luis Lekkas of the West End Gang was making regular trips between the Nomad "bank" on Beaubien Street to Matticks's estate, carrying bags full of $500,000 in cash.

In the summer of 2000, Kane was described as being highly depressed as he noted he was still working as a chauffeur for the Hells Angels, spending his days driving around the Nomad Normand Robitaille around Montreal while other Angels had no trouble assigning him their debts. One Hells Angel Denis Houle told Kane that he now had to pay off the $80,000 drug debt that he had run up with the Sherbrooke chapter of the Angels. At the same time, Kane's patron Carroll had run up a $400,000 drug debt which was forgiven, which emphasized Kane's lack of importance.

Kane was invited to a fellow biker's wedding in the summer of 2000, and to help protect his cover police gave him $1,000 to bring as a wedding gift. A few days after the wedding, Kane's body was found in the garage of his suburban Montreal home with a confusing suicide note that mentioned his sexuality and conflict involved with being a biker and an informant. Kane's suicide note stated: "Who am I? Am I a biker? Am I a policeman? Am I good or evil? Am I heterosexual or gay? Am I loved or feared? Am I exploited or the exploiter?" Commander André Bouchard of the Montreal police stated in an interview: "A lot of people say that we killed him, and a lot of people say that he was killed by the Hells Angels, and a lot of people say he's not dead. But I can tell you that he's dead, because my friend was his controller and was the one who identified him in his car. Dany was the best source we had. He'd call [the police] before he had a meeting with Mom [Boucher], and we'd put cameras in...that's how we got them. Dany even gave us Matticks on Beaubien Street where we got Matticks coming in there with fucking hockey bags full of money". Bouchard suggested that Kane killed himself because he knew that ultimately he would have to testify against the Hells Angel leaders, which would expose him as an informer. There has been much controversy in Canada about the fact that Kane committed 11 murders while working as a Royal Canadian Mounted Police informer with the allegation made by the journalist Paul Palango that the Mounties allowed Kane too much leeway out a desire for information about the ultra-secretive Hells Angels.
