= Louis Roy =

Canadian outlaw biker and gangster (1959-2000)

- Roy wearing his Hells Angels colours
- Born: 20 July 1959; Trois-Rivières, Quebec, Canada
- Disappeared: 23 June 2000 (aged 40); Montreal, Quebec, Canada
- Status: Missing for 26 years, 3 months and 21 days
- Other name: "Mélou"
- Occupations: Outlaw biker, gangster
- Allegiance: Satan's Guard MC; Hells Angels MC (1991–2000)

Louis Roy (20 July 1959 – disappeared 23 June 2000), better known as "Mélou", was a Canadian outlaw biker and gangster, said to have been the richest Hells Angel in Quebec.

== Biography ==
Roy was born and grew up in Trois-Rivières. He was a member of the Saint-Éloi-based Missiles outlaw biker gang, which later became the Satan's Guard club of Saguenay. Roy founded and led Satan's Guard with Richard "Crow" Émond as his second-in-command, and the club became the dominant gang in the Saguenay–Lac-Saint-Jean region by eliminating rivals. In October 1984, Satan's Guard blew up the van of Omer Gagnon, president of the El Conquatcheros gang in Chicoutimi. Two independent drug dealers were also targeted in a car bombing in Maria-Chapdelaine in October 1990. Satan's Guard "patched over" to join the Hells Angels on 14 June 1991. Roy became the president of the Angels' Trois-Rivières chapter, which forged a close alliance with the Rizzuto family of Montreal. Roy also forged a close friendship with Maurice "Mom" Boucher. The crime journalist André Cedilot called Roy the second most powerful Hells Angel in Quebec after Boucher, saying: "He was one of the most influential members of the Hells Angels". Roy's status as the richest Hells Angel arose because he had almost a monopoly on the drug trade in Trois-Rivières. Roy was also very active in selling cocaine throughout Quebec, making him one of the most important drug dealers in la belle province.

In November 1994, Roy hired Serge Quesnel via Quesnel's lawyer to work as a hitman for the Hells Angels. After his release from prison, Quesnel's lawyer introduced him to Roy. Roy told Quesnel that in exchange for his work as a hitman, he would be paid $500 per week with a commission of at least $10,000 per murder. Roy told Quesnel that his commissions would depend on the degree of difficulty of the murders with commissions of $50,000 for those who were well-guarded. Quesnel wrote in his 2003 memoirs Testament d’un tueur des Hells that: "Mélou was the richest Angel in Quebec, and I was his protégé. We travelled together, and I could see that he was among the most powerful members of the 'profession'. He carried a booklet with the names, addresses, license plate numbers and descriptions of fifty or so undesirable individuals. When I saw it, I realized that the Trois-Rivières Hells Angels were very powerful".

Roy gave Quesnel $2,000 cash as an advance payment and promised him $8,000 more if he killed Jacques Ferland. Ferland was a chemist in Quebec City who manufactured PCP for the Rock Machine. Quesnel killed Ferland in his Quebec City house on 30 January 1995. On 27 February 1995, Quesnel killed Claude "The Peak" Rivard, a Montreal drug dealer who worked for the Pelletier clan, which was allied with the Rock Machine. On 23 March 1995, Quesnel killed Richard "Chico" Delcourt, a Montreal drug dealer who refused to work with either the Rock Machine or the Hells Angels. Quesnel later testified that he committed all these murders on Roy's orders. Roy offered Quesnel $50,000 if he could kill Gilles Lambert, an important leader of the Rock Machine. Quesnel was arrested in April 1995 before he could make the attempt on Lambert's life.

After Quesnel became a délateur (informer), Roy was arrested and charged with three counts of first-degree murder along with Sylvain "Baptiste" Thiffault, the vice-president of the Trois-Rivières chapter. After his arrest, Roy was replaced as Trois-Rivières chapter president by Richard "Crow" Émond. On 25 June 1995, Roy became a founding member of the Angels' elite Nomad chapter. Besides Roy, the other members of the Nomad chapter were Walter Stadnick, Maurice Boucher, Donald "Pup" Stockford, David "Wolf" Carroll, Gilles "Trooper" Mathieu, Richard "Bert" Mayrand, Pierre Laurin, Richard "Rick" Vallée, André Chouinard, Michel Rose, Denis "Pas Fiable" Houle, Normand Robitaille, Normand "Biff" Hamel, and René "Balloune" Charlebois. Roy was considered one of the more able Hells Angels and included in the Nomad chapter for that reason.

On 4 April 1997 while Roy and Thiffault were being driven by armored car to the courthouse to hear the verdict in the murder case against them, they were surprised to find themselves sharing their transport with Robert Hardy of the Rock Machine. Taking advantage of the opportunity, Roy and Thiffault beat up Hardy during the ride. When the car arrived, the bloodied and battered body of Hardy fell out, who had to be rushed to the hospital in order to save his life. Quesnel turned out to be a very poor witness for the Crown, and the trial ended with both Roy and Thiffault acquitted on all counts.

Following his acquittal, Roy returned to Trois-Rivières. The Trois-Rivières chapter maintained several puppet clubs such as the Jokers of Saint-Jean, the Blatnois of Mauricie and the Rowdy Crew of Lanaudière. Following Roy's release, six members of the puppet gangs disappeared, neither to be seen nor heard from again. At the same time, Roy sent Hells Angels to search the houses of the vanished members, removing various items over the protests of the girlfriends and wives of the missing men. The missing men are Ormand Dorant, Guy Mageanu, Benoît Lachance, Clermont Carrier, Edward Villiers, and Sylvain Bernard.

On 23 August 1997, Roy survived an attempted murder by the contract killer Gérald Gallant outside his parents' motel, the Motel Royal in Jonquière, where he resided. Gallant waited in a swamp near the motel's parking lot, and emerged with two loaded revolvers when he saw Roy returning. Roy was alerted by the sound of Gallant's wet shoes as he approached, and he was able to evade most of the hitman's gunfire but suffered a wound to the chest. Gallant, who fled the scene when he ran out of ammunition, was paid $20,000 by Rock Machine member Marcel "Le Maire" Demers for the failed assassination. Prior to the shooting, Gallant's mistress and accomplice Jacqueline Benoît rented a room at the motel to carry out surveillance on Roy. Roy refused to co-operate with the police whom he called "pigs" and refused to file a complaint about the shooting.

The informer Dany Kane mentioned in his notes to his police handlers that Hells Angel David Carroll told him that Boucher had agreed with Vito Rizzuto that the price of cocaine in Canada was to be $50,000 per kilogram. Kane also reported that the penalty for selling cocaine below that price was death. Kane reported that a gang within the gang called La Table consisting of Boucher, Denis Houle, Michel Rose, Normand Robitaille and André Chouinard set the prices for drugs in Quebec in consultation with the Mafia. Carroll mentioned to Kane that Boucher wanted Roy to join La Table, which he refused to, leading to Carroll to express the hope there would be no issues caused by this refusal. Finally, Kane mentioned that both Boucher and Rizzuto were very annoyed that Roy persisted with selling cocaine below $50,000 per kilogram, and wanted him to join La Table.

== Disappearance ==
On 23 June 2000, Roy disappeared after departing for a party at the house of Boucher's father to celebrate the 5th anniversary of the founding of the Nomads. Roy frequently ignored Boucher's orders by selling cocaine for less than $50,000 per kilogram, which reportedly angered Boucher, but Roy believed his status as a founding member of the Nomad chapter immunized him from punishment. In July 2001, Elias Lekkas of the West End Gang testified that Roy went from the Boucher household to a meat-processing plant owned by Gerald Matticks. Roy was then bound, gagged and, while still alive, run through a meat-grinding machine.

Andrea "Andrew" Scoppa – a member of the Rizzuto family – in his posthumously published 2022 book La Source confirmed that Roy's cause of death was being run through a meat-grinder. Scoppa was murdered on 21 October 2019 in Montreal, found shot dead in front of a store at 4744 Saint-Jean Boulevard. However, Scoppa was interviewed several times between October 2014-October 2019 by journalists Félix Séguin and Éric Thibault, where he spoke frankly about his underworld activities on the condition that the interviews only be published after his death. In an interview with Séguin and Thibault, Scoppa stated that Rizzuto made a secret deal with Boucher that in exchange for throwing the full support of the Rizzuto family against the Rock Machine and killing the pro-Rock Machine Rizzuto family capo Paolo Gervas, Boucher in exchange would have Roy killed. Scoppa maintained that Boucher tolerated Roy selling cocaine below $50,000 per kilogram as a way to pressure Rizzuto to act against Gervasi, who had taken a very pro-Rock Machine line. Gervasi ran a strip-club, the Castel Tina, along with his son Salvatore, where members of the Rock Machine always had reserved tables and were allowed to wear their gang colors.

The Rock Machine had been supported financially by the Dark Circle, a group of outwardly 'respectable' Montreal businessmen who covertly engaged in organized crime, hence the name. The Dark Circle supplied the money that allowed the Rock Machine to buy cocaine and to hire hitmen. In 1998, Salvatore Brunnetti, a prominent Montreal restaurateur and a member of the Dark Circle, defected to the Hells Angels. Brunnetti provided the Angels with the names and addresses of the other members of the Dark Circle, whom the Angels then proceeded to hunt down. The end of the Dark Circle had largely driven the Rock Machine out of the drug business by depriving them of capital. By 2000, the Gervasis were the only people still willing to sell the Rock Machine drugs. Scoppa stated that Boucher's attitude was both sides had to take care of their own "garbage" and that he would only have Roy killed if Rizzuto had Gervasi killed, which led to an agreement being struck along that line. Salvatore Gervasi was killed on 22 April 2000, being found shot dead inside of his parked automobile. According to Scoppa, Roy went to Boucher's party and then went to the meat factory to meet Matticks. Scoppa stated that Roy was self-confident as he was with his friends and had no fears about the meeting at the meat factory. After his arrival at the factory, he was seized by his so-called "friends" who proceeded to run him through the meat grinder while still alive. In return, Rizzuto had an attempt made against the life of Paulo Gervasi 4 August 2000. Paulo Gervasi become estranged from Rizzuto following the murder of his son and the attempt on his own life, causing him to drift to the sidelines of the Rizzuto family. On 19 January 2004, Gervasi was killed outside of a bakery in the St. Leonard district of Montreal.

After his disappearance, Roy's assets were all divided up by his fellow Nomads as if he had never existed. Other members of the Hells Angels who had vanished and later turned out to still be alive such as the hitman Paul "Fon Fon" Fontaine and Richard Vallée were still listed on the membership lists of the Angels; however, Roy's name was abruptly removed from the membership lists in June 2000. Paul Cherry, the crime correspondent of The Montreal Gazette, wrote that Roy's sudden and unexplained removal from the Hells Angels membership lists indicated that he was dead.

The police believe it was no accident that at the same time that Roy vanished in late June 2000, that Luc Bordeleau of the Hells Angels puppet gang, the Rockers Motor Club, was suddenly promoted up to be a "prospect" with the Hells Angels proper. Roy's girlfriend, Rosalba Guerrera, never reported him missing. When Sûreté du Québec detectives questioned her on 3 August 2000, she stated: "It's been 15 years that I've been with a [member of the] Hells. I live in that world and I know how it works. Now, I'm going to try and rebuild my life". On 12 December 2000, the account that Roy had with the Nomad "bank" in Montreal was terminated, with the money being divided amongst the other Nomads, which was a strong sign that Roy was no longer with the Hells Angels. Regardless of his precise fate, Roy was never seen or heard from again after going to Boucher's party. Roy's blue Mercedes-Benz was found parked on the street near the house of Boucher's father several days after his disappearance, covered in unpaid parking tickets. It is generally accepted that Roy is dead.

== See also ==
- List of people who disappeared mysteriously (2000–present)

== Books ==
- Cédilot, André; Noël, André (2012). Mafia Inc.: The Long, Bloody Reign of Canada's Sicilian Clan. Toronto: Vintage Canada. ISBN 9780307360410.
- Cherry, Paul (2006). The Biker Trials: Bringing Down the Hells Angels. Toronto: ECW Press. ISBN 978-1550226386.
- Langton, Jerry (2006). Fallen Angel: The Unlikely Rise of Walter Stadnick and the Canadian Hells Angels. Toronto: Harper Collins. ISBN 144342725X.
- Langton, Jerry (2010). Showdown: How the Outlaws, Hells Angels and Cops Fought for Control of the Streets. Toronto: John Wiley. ISBN 978-0470678787..
- Lavigne, Yves (1999). Hells Angels at War. Toronto: HarperCollins. ISBN 9780002000246.
- Séguin, Felix; Thibault, Éric (2022). Inside the Montreal Mafia: The Confessions of Andrew Scoppa. Toronto: ECW Press. ISBN 978-1770416673.
- Schneider, Stephen (2009). Iced: The Story of Organized Crime in Canada (2nd ed.). Toronto: John Wiley & Sons. ISBN 978-0470835005.
- Sher, Julian; Marsden, William (2003). The Road To Hell How the Biker Gangs Are Conquering Canada. Toronto: Alfred Knopf. ISBN 0-676-97598-4.
