= Walter Stadnick =

Canadian outlaw biker and gangster

- Born: Wolodumir Stadnik; 3 August 1952 (age 74); Hamilton, Ontario, Canada
- Other name: "Nurget"
- Occupations: Outlaw biker, gangster
- Years active: 1968–
- Known for: National president of the Hells Angels in Canada
- Predecessor: Michel Langlois
- Successor: Billy Miller and Gerald Ward
- Allegiance: Cossacks MC (1968–1977); Wild Ones MC (1977–1979); Hells Angels MC (1982–)
- Convictions: Drug possession with the intention to sell (1971); Conspiracy to commit murder, drug trafficking and gangsterism (2004)
- Penalty: 20 years' imprisonment (2004)

Wolodumir "Walter" Stadnick (born 3 August 1952), also known as "Nurget", is a Canadian outlaw biker and gangster who was the third national president of the Hells Angels Motorcycle Club in Canada. Stadnick is generally credited with turning the Hells Angels into the dominant outlaw biker club in Canada. The journalists Michel Auger and Peter Edwards wrote that much about Stadnick is mysterious, ranging from what is the meaning of his sobriquet "Nurget", to how a unilingual Anglo Canadian from Hamilton became the leader of the then largely French-Canadian Hells Angels. In 2004, the journalist Tu Thanh Ha wrote that Stadnick is "a secretive man little known to the public", but "he is one of Canada's most pivotal organized-crime figures."

== From the Cossacks to the Wild Ones ==
Wolodumir Stadnik was born on the "upper side" of Hamilton atop of "the Mountain", as locals call the Niagara Escarpment, to a family of Ukrainian immigrants. His parents were Andriy and Valentina Stadnick, who lived at 98 East 16th Street, in a working-class neighborhood known for its high rate of petty crime. In elementary school, he changed the spelling of his surname to Stadnick and preferred to be called Walter rather than Wolodumir. As a child, he regularly attended the local Uniate Catholic church and was described as quiet and well-behaved. One former teacher said about him: "He clearly had a great deal of natural intelligence, but he was impossible to motivate. It was almost like he didn't want to succeed".

As a teenager, Stadnick was known as the resident drug dealer at his high school, and by 1970, he was already known by his nickname "Nurget". It remains a mystery why Stadnick's nickname is "Nurget"; one Hamilton police officer says it goes back to his high school days when as the neighborhood hash dealer, Stadnick always had a "nugget" of hash to sell. As a high school student, he began a lifelong practice of dressing flamboyantly by wearing bright jewelry such as rings and chains. Stadnick did well in auto shop at the Hill Park Secondary School, but was otherwise an indifferent student. Those who knew him in high school considered Stadnick to be a "tough little guy" who, despite his short stature, was known as a fighter. He was very ambitious; joining a biker gang as a teenager in Hamilton called the Cossacks, who were noted for their habit of growing their hair long and drilling holes in their bike helmets, through which they would run their hair. Stadnick named the gang the Cossacks as a reference to his Ukrainian heritage.

On 23 October 1970, Stadnick was arrested after a police officer found LSD tablets in his pocket. Stadnick was charged but made bail. Subsequently, Stadnick was arrested a second time for the possession of hash with the intention to distribute. On 6 January 1971 when the preliminary hearing was held to decide whether Stadnick's case would go to trial or not, Stadnick's biker friends showed up and misbehaved in court, leading the judge to expel them from the courtroom. Outside the courtroom, Stadnick's biker associates began to swear at and threaten one of the policemen scheduled to testify against him, leading to a brawl in the hallway. Standick was convicted of drug possession with the intention to sell.

Stadnick was initially friendly with his future archenemy, Mario "the Wop" Parente, the president of the Hamilton chapter of Satan's Choice outlaw biker gang, but the two reportedly fell out when Parente vetoed the 5'4 Stadnick's attempt to join Satan's Choice under the grounds that he was too short. Satan's Choice were the most powerful outlaw biker club in Ontario in the 1960s and 1970s. In 1973, the Hells Angels offered Bernie Guindon, the national president of Satan's Choice, the opportunity to have his club "patch over" to become Hells Angels, an offer the Canadian nationalist Guindon promptly rejected, saying he rather keep his club Canadian. Unable to join Satan's Choice, Stadnick instead joined the Wild Ones outlaw biker club in 1977. As the Wild Ones were more a senior club than the Cossacks, being allowed to join was a step-up for Stadnick. Stadnick was known for being quiet, for never smoking or doing drugs, and for drinking in moderation.

One Satan's Choice biker, Cecil Kirby, who first saw Stadnick at a bikers' convention in Wasaga Beach in 1977, recalled that Stadnick seemed to be trying too hard to pass himself as a "hardcore" biker, remembering: "I didn't like him. I thought he was a sort of a poser." Kirby described Stadnick as someone who kept "rock star hours" as he was up late and rarely got up until after 1 in the afternoon. On 1 July 1977, Parente, with the rest of the Hamilton chapter of the Satan's Choice club, "patched over" to join the Outlaws who wanted to expand into Canada. On 5 December 1977, the Popeyes of Montreal, generally considered to be the most violent of all of Quebec's many outlaw biker clubs, "patched over" to become the first Hells Angels chapter in Canada. On 17 February 1978, a biker war began between the Outlaws and the Hells Angels. The conflict was started when the Hells Angel Yves "Apache" Trudeau shot two Outlaws in Montreal, killing one.

By 1978, Stadnick had become the leader of the Wild Ones. In the 1970s, outlaw biker clubs were very much subordinate to the Mafia and other organized crime groups like the West End Gang who employed outlaw bikers to do "dirty work" that they did not wish to do themselves. The Wild Ones worked as subcontractors for the Mafia, being used to bomb businesses that refused to pay extortion money. A Hamilton police detective, Ken Roberston, who investigated the bombings, stated: "It was quite a sophisticated operation". Another Hamilton police officer, John Gordon Harris, said of Stadnick: "He was a little short guy. He certainly wasn't the most visible member of the gang. He was just a face in the crowd. He was almost invisible – but he did have a head on his shoulders." The journalists Julian Sher and William Marsden called Harris the "nemesis" of Stadnick who pursued him from the 1970s onward. The private detective Alex Caine, who met Stadnick several times, described him as "a vindictive little man with the charisma of a hockey puck" who appeared to be trying to over-compensate due to his diminutive stature. The journalist Peter Edwards wrote that Stadnick seemed to have a Napoleon complex as despite his short stature that "there was something undeniably huge about the man." The Wild Ones were considered to be one of the lesser outlaw biker clubs in Hamilton, and the Outlaws chapter tolerated their existence as they were not seen to be a threat.

In 1978, Stadnick contacted Yves Buteau, the national president of Hells Angels Canada, to discuss having the Wild Ones "patch over" to become the first Hells Angels chapter in Ontario. John Gordon Harris of the Hamilton police told the journalist Jerry Langton: "As soon as the Wild Ones began to associate with the Hells Angels, the Outlaws told them they shouldn't do that. And they probably shouldn't have, as it led to several deaths." The Hamilton chapter of the Outlaws started killing the Wild Ones, and after five members of the Wild Ones were killed during the course of 1978 and 1979, the gang disbanded. Harris stated that as the Wild Ones kept being killed: "A lot of them are thinking, 'you know what, maybe I don't want to be a biker anymore.' But the hard-core ones, they're still thinking they want to be Hells Angels. I think Stadnick thought, 'this will never happen to me. I'm too smart for this. The ones we're losing were the careless ones.'"

In October 1978 Stadnick went to Montreal to meet Buteau and the other Hells Angels leaders. During his trip to Montreal, Stadnick survived Le Tourbillon massacre on 12 October 1978 when the Outlaws stormed into Le Tourbillon bar to shoot the Angels and Wild Ones who were meeting there, killing one of the Angels and two of the Wild Ones. Two American Outlaws, one from Miami and the other from Detroit, had entered the bar after following the Angels around. One Angel, Louis "Ti-Oui" Lapierre, rose to confront the two American Outlaws, only to be gunned down when one of the Outlaws pulled out his handgun while the other pulled out a sawed-off shotgun and opened fire on the party in the booth. One of the Angels, Jean Brochu, was killed, while Lapierre and another Angel, Bruno Coulombe, were badly wounded. Of the Wild Ones, George "Chico" Mousseau and Gary "Gator" Davies were killed. Stadnick survived by hiding under the table. Buteau learned that the man who hired the two American Outlaws was Roland "Roxy" Dutemple of the Outlaws' Montreal chapter and sent his ace assassin, Yves Trudeau, after him. Trudeau killed Dutemple with a car bomb on 29 March 1979. Upon his return to Hamilton, Stadnick found that his gang had voted themselves out of existence. He chose to continue as a Hells Angel, operating in Montreal and alone in Hamilton.

== Hells Angels ==
Despite not speaking any French, Stadnick joined the Montreal South "mother chapter" of the Hells Angels and quickly rose through the ranks. He received his full patch on 26 May 1982. In December 1982, Stadnick returned to Hamilton after living in Montreal for a number of years together with another Wild One turned Hells Angel, Noel "Frenchy" Mailloux, who had served as Stadnick's translator during his time in Montreal. Despite orders from Stadnick not to attract attention, Mailloux, with his stripper girlfriend Connie Augustin, went on a lengthy cocaine binge. On 17 February 1983, in a moment of cocaine-induced paranoia, Mailloux attempted to murder Augustin, shooting her several times, at the same time killing her four-year old son Stewart Hawley and her best friend Cindy Lee Thompson. Mailloux was found afterwards wandering the streets of Hamilton, high on cocaine, blabbering nonsense, and firing his empty gun at anybody he met on the streets. The incident badly damaged the image of the Hells Angels in Ontario, making them look to be out of control and dangerous, and Stadnick was forced to suspend his efforts at trying to set up a Hells Angels chapter in Ontario for some time. In July 1983, Buteau established the first Angel chapters outside of Quebec when he persuaded the three-chapter-strong Satan's Angels biker gang, based in the Lower Mainland of British Columbia and on Vancouver Island, to "patch over" to join the Hells Angels. On 17 July 1983, while riding through northern Ontario, Parente happened to see two Hells Angels from Montreal, Michel "Jinx" Genest and Jean-Marc Nadeau, on the bus to Vancouver to attend the ceremony. Enraged, Parente and the other Outlaws proceeded to shoot up the bus when it stopped at the Mr. Mugs coffee and doughnut shop in Wawa in an attempt to kill the two Hells Angels. Although no one was killed, the Wawa incident showed how strongly Parente felt about Hells Angels moving into Ontario. On 21 July 1983, the "patch over" took place in Vancouver, establishing the Hells Angels in British Columbia.

On 8 September 1983, Stadnick's patron Buteau was assassinated by an Outlaw, Gino Goudreau, in Longueuil, which many assumed at the time would be the end of Stadnick's career as he did not speak any French while being a member of what was then a predominately French-Canadian outlaw biker club. At the time of his assassination, Buteau was meeting Guy Gilbert, an emissary of the Kitchener chapter of Satan's Choice, who was also killed by Goudreau, to discuss "patching over" to become Hells Angels. Buteau's successor as national president, Michel "Sky" Langlois, together with his right-hand man, Réjean "Zig Zag" Lessard, both decided that Stadnick offered their best hope of establishing the Hells Angels in Ontario. It was around this time that Stadnick started wearing a "Filthy Few" patch that the police say is awarded to those who kill for the gang. The underworld of Hamilton at that time was dominated by the three Mafia families, the Papalia crime family, the Musitano crime family and the Luppino crime family, together with the local Outlaws chapter, which made Hamilton a dangerous place for Stadnick and required him to keep a low profile. The leader of the Papalia family, Johnny "the Enforcer" Papalia, one of the most feared men in the Canadian Mafia, was well known for his dislike of outlaw bikers, and made it clear he did not want a Hells Angels chapter in Hamilton.

On 8 September 1984, Stadnick was badly injured in a traffic incident in which he ran his motorcycle into a car driven by a Catholic priest in Drummondville, Quebec. Stadnick was on his way to attend a memorial service for Buteau, who was killed on that day in 1983, when a Catholic priest who was speeding on his way to Montreal to see Pope John Paul II, who was visiting Canada, led to the traffic incident. The fire caused by the traffic incident left much of Stadnick's body covered with third-degree burns. Stadnick's face was badly burned, leaving him with what were described as "horrific" scars to his face. As a result of the burns to his body, Stadnick lost much of his nose and half of two of his fingers. Initially, Stadnick went to a hospital in Montreal, but as none of the nurses spoke English, he transferred over to a hospital in his hometown. Lessard arranged for members of the 13th Tribe biker gang from Halifax led by David "Wolf" Carroll, who were hoping to join the Hells Angels, to guard Stadnick. Stadnick went to St. Joseph's Hospital in Hamilton, and believing that his archenemy Parente would try to kill him, asked the Hamilton police to guard him during his stay at St. Joseph's. Harris was opposed to the police guarding Stadnick, saying: "I didn't like it. I thought we were compromising our integrity. They said he was a citizen like anybody else. 'Yeah,' I said, but lets remember who he is and what he belongs to." Stadnick had some doubts about the competence of the 13th Tribe to guard him in the daytime and instead the Hamilton police protected him in the nighttime as he recovered. A nurse recalled: "It was crazy; most of the day there were these big, burly bikers outside his room. And the rest of the time it was these big, burly cops-it was like he was a rock star or something. You could tell these bikers were small-town boys; they weren't used to the cops like what we had here in Hamilton. They used to taunt and tease the bikers all the time-trying to start a fight, eh?" The policeman called Stadnick a "French fry" while the bikers called the Hamilton policemen the "doughnut gang;" several times Harris warned that he would have Carroll and the rest all arrested if they persisted with their disruptive behavior. As a reward for guarding Stadnick the 13th Tribe were allowed to join the Hells Angels on 5 December 1984, becoming the first Angel chapter in Atlantic Canada. As a result of his face becoming grotesquely deformed, Stadnick was described by Harris as becoming more introverted than before.

By 1986, Stadnick was living in a trailer park in the Hamilton suburb of Carlisle. One of his neighbors recalled: "He never caused any problems; he was always friendly. I didn't even know he was a biker – he always drove a car up here." In the summer of 1986, one of Stadnick's neighbors found a plastic container full of amphetamines. Detective Harris stated "it was full of amphetamines and we knew it was his. So we put the container back where it was found and kept an eye on it." However, Stadnick stayed away from the container, leading Harris to say: "He was pretty smart. If nothing else, he had the ability to keep himself out of trouble." Harris described Stadnick as being "civil enough, but he never had a sense of humor". Stadnick was careful enough to always hold his discussions with other bikers outside to avoid police bugs. Stadnick did not own, but was described as running, the Rebel Roadhouse bar in Hamilton. One Hamilton police officer stated: "He had an office in the back, through the kitchen. It was good place to entertain visiting Angels." Stadnick used the Rebel Roadhouse as a place to conduct his business. The Outlaws planned to assassinate Stadnick by firing a rocket launcher at the Rebel Roadhouse, but the police arrested those involved in the plot before the attack occurred. Detective Harris stated about the failed plot: "When Parente was running the show, they would had done it; but after he went to prison they didn't have the guts." During his frequent visits to meet the Hells Angels national leaders at the "mother chapter" in Montreal, Stadnick met in 1986 another Hells Angel, Maurice "Mom" Boucher. Despite the fact that Stadnick spoke no French and Boucher no English, forcing them to use translators, the two men became friends. From 1987 onward, Stadnick was closely associated with Boucher who had become a "full patch" Hells Angel on 1 May 1987.

In 1987, Stadnick went to Toronto to try to persuade an outlaw biker club, the Vagabonds, to "patch over" to become Hells Angels. The Vagabonds had about 70 members and were active in the Toronto drug trade. The president of the Vagabonds, Donald "Snorkel" Melanson, wanted to "patch over" to join to the Hells Angels and, as a prelude, agreed to buy his cocaine only from the Montreal "mother chapter" of the Hells Angels. However, Melanson – who owed his nickname to his practice of snorting cocaine with a snorkel – consumed much of the cocaine he was supposed to sell and he was soon $80,000 in debt to the Hells Angels. After remortgaging his house, Melanson contacted the Hells Angels to say he had some $50,000 in cash of the $80,000 that he owed and he would meet them in a room in a hotel on Yonge Street to hand it over, promising he would pay off the remaining $30,000 soon. On the night of 2 September 1987, Melanson went to the hotel to hand over the money to the Hells Angels. The following morning, the cleaners at the hotel discovered Melanson's corpse with two bullets in his head. The money was gone. The murder of Melanson created much ill-will towards the Hells Angels and the Vagabonds for some time, and the plans to "patch over" were aborted. On 5 November 1987, Stadnick was arrested for the first time since 1971, The offense he was arrested for was merely drunk driving for which he was fined $750. Aiding Stadnick was the 1988 conviction of his archenemy Parente, who had become the national president of the Outlaws, of manslaughter in connection with the shooting death of Jimmy Lewis.

In 1988, Stadnick became the national president of the Canadian Hells Angels. In the spring of 1988, Langlois fled to Morocco to escape charges of first-degree murder in connection with his role in the Lennoxville massacre of 1985, and Stadnick was chosen to be his successor. After the Lennoxville massacre, the Angels' ace assassin, Yves Trudeau, had turned Crown's evidence, testifying against dozens of Hells Angels. In 1988, the Canadian Hells Angels were in decline; of the 50 members of the club in Quebec, 19 were in prison after being convicted of murder on the basis of Trudeau's testimony; 13, including the previous national president Langlois, were on the run to escape murder charges; and another five were in jail facing charges of murder. The Angels seemed to have chosen Stadnick as their president as the best man to turn around the fortunes of the club and allow the Angels to expand into the other provinces. Harris stated: "He got it by default. He was the last guy that had some seniority and some smarts." At the time, most of the Angels' chapters were in Quebec, although there were also three chapters in British Columbia and one chapter in Nova Scotia.

=== National president ===
As national president, Stadnick immediately appointed Boucher his Quebec lieutenant and informed him that he would largely run Hells Angels operations in Quebec, while Stadnick focused on expanding the Angels into the rest of Canada. In one of his first acts as president, Stadnick together with Boucher went to Quebec City on 28 May 1988 to meet the leaders of an outlaw biker club called the Vikings. The meeting went so well that the Vikings agreed to "patch over" to become Hells Angels' Quebec City chapter the same night. On 23 August 1988, Stadnick was arrested at the home of Douglas Freeborn, a former Satan's Choice member and a prominent drug dealer in Hamilton. Found with him were eleven ounces of hash, which led the police to charge him with intention to sell drugs, but the charges were dropped as Freeborn sworn in court that the hash belonged to him and Stadnick had nothing to do with his drug-dealing. Stadnick denied being the national president, saying "Ah, just because you get more attention than the others, all of a sudden you're named president by the media." Harris noted when Stadnick became the Hells Angel national president, he started to own a Jaguar automobile with Quebec license plates, which stood out in the working class city of Hamilton.

By 1990, Stadnick was being monitored by the police in both Quebec and Ontario, who considered him to be one of the most dangerous Hells Angels in Canada. For Standick, the two most important provinces to expand into were Manitoba and Ontario. Southern Ontario, especially the "Golden Horseshoe" area, as the greater Toronto area is known, was the wealthiest part of Canada and hence the most lucrative area for an outlaw biker club to operate in. The journalists Julian Sher and William Marsden wrote that Manitoba was crucial because it was "the axis of distribution for any drugs moving east and west in the country." The majority of the drugs in British Columbia are either consumed locally or exported to more profitable markets such as the United States, Japan and Australia. The majority the drugs in the Prairie provinces originate in Montreal and arrive via Ontario. Winnipeg is the main point where drugs enter the Prairies, which led Stadnick to place much emphasis upon control of the Winnipeg underworld. Caine described Stadnick as the superior strategist compared to Parente as Stadnick saw establishing the Angels in Winnipeg as important to creating a national club, while Parente was only focused on Ontario. Caine described Parente as a traditional biker leader, the working-class tough guy, while Stadnick was a modern biker leader who was more akin to a corporate CEO. Since Stadnick had connections across the country, he became the Hells Angels' ambassador, traveling all over the country to recruit bikers and proceed with drug sales. The modern Hells Angels organization in Canada was largely Stadnick's work. Jean-Pierre Lévesque of the Royal Canadian Mounted Police (RCMP) said of Stadnick: "He travelled the country. He knew almost everybody. He had a country-wide vision. He knows it's good for business – the bigger the name, the better the business." In the underworld circles, Stadnick was considered to be an excellent judge of talent, and he was well known for recruiting the ablest criminals into the Hells Angels. Most outlaw biker clubs welcomed a chance to meet the president of the Canadian Hells Angels, the best known outlaw biker club in the world. Ernie Dew, the president of los Bravos outlaw biker club in Winnipeg, which later became the first Hells Angel chapter in Manitoba, said of the Angels: "This was the club. You've gone from the farm team to the major leagues."

Unlike his Quebec lieutenant "Mom" Boucher, who sought to annihilate the rival Rock Machine in the Quebec biker war, Stadnick had a more diplomatic and conciliatory approach, favoring having the majority of the other Canadian outlaw biker clubs "patching over" to become Hells Angels while leaving the rest to "wither on the vine and die." The journalist Jerry Langton stated: "An informant told me that if he could boil down Walter's philosophy to one sentence, it would be: 'He would rather buy his rival a drink than kick his head in.'" There are three ways to expand an outlaw biker club – recruiting local criminals to found a new chapter; having members of an existing chapter move to a new city to establish another chapter; or having an outlaw biker club "patch over" to join another club. Stadnick tried a variety of all three but preferred "patching over." Throughout the 1990s, he worked hard to establish a network of drug dealers in northern Ontario that served as the basis for expanding the Hells Angels into southern Ontario. Stadnick chose northern Ontario because of the relatively smaller number of outlaw biker clubs there compared to southern Ontario, and because of the lack of competition. In the process, Stadnick recruited a criminal from Thunder Bay into the Hells Angels, Donald "Bam Bam" Magnussen, a huge, hulking, muscular man notorious in the Thunder Bay underworld for his brutality and aggressiveness. When Bernie "The Frog" Guindon, the national president of Satan's Choice, was released from prison in 1991, Stadnick was one of the first to greet him upon his release and asked if he was willing to have Satan's Choice "patch over" to join the Hells Angels, an offer Guindon rejected.

Stadnick was known in the 1990s for his flamboyant way of dressing, wearing a full-length coat made from wolf's fur and a snakeskin belt with a solid gold belt buckle in the form of the Hells Angels' winged death's head that was hollowed inside to allow him to carry cash. On 26 June 1992, Stadnick was arrested at the Winnipeg International Airport with over $80,000 worth of cash, and charged with living off the proceeds of organised crime. Of the $80,000 he was carrying, $15,000 was hidden inside the opening carved into the gold belt buckle. In August 1992, Stadnick and Magnussen were involved in a brawl with two off-duty Winnipeg police officers that led them to be charged with assault, but the charges were dropped. In June 1993, Stadnick went to Wasaga Beach to attend a convention of the Loners outlaw biker gang and to meet their leader, Frank "Cisco" Lenti, to discuss having the Loners "patch over" to become Hells Angels. Stadnick disliked Lenti, but he knew that the Loners were one of the strongest outlaw biker clubs in Ontario making them the ideal candidates to become Hells Angels. The meeting ended badly, with Lenti rejecting Stadnick's offer. Stadnick continued to offer Lenti a chance to "patch over" several times in 1993 and 1994, but Lenti declined, instead offering Stadnick a chance to join the Loners. Although the Loners refused to "patch over" to the Hells Angels, Stadnick is reported to have become their chief supplier of drugs from 1993 onward and to have been behind the rumors that Lenti was stealing from his own club which led to Lenti's expulsion in 1994. Stadnick stayed in contact with Guindon in attempts to persuade the Satan's Choice to "patch over" to the Hells Angels. Stadnick had more success with bringing the four Hells Angels chapters in British Columbia under the control of the Montreal "mother chapter" and by 1993 had ensured that all of the Angel chapters in Canada answered to Montreal.

Shortly before his trial for living off the proceeds of crime was due to start on 4 October 1993, the Winnipeg Sun ran an article on Stadnick which led his lawyer to ask for the charges to be dropped, claiming the story by the journalist Melanie Verhaeghe had jeopardised his ability to get a fair trial. Verhaeghe found that Magnussen was following her around in an attempt to intimidate her, while Stadnick's lawyer went to court to try to force her to reveal her sources. Stadnick's lawyer told Verhaghe that he had a "file" on her, saying Stadnick had hired a private detective to investigate her. Stadnick was unable to force Verhaege to reveal her sources and the judge rejected the attempt to stay the proceedings, but the effort had delayed his trial for 15 months. Charges were dropped when he settled on forfeiting the $80,000.

=== "Patching over": consolidation of Canadian outlaw biking ===
Stadnick spent much of the 1990s living in Winnipeg, where he courted - and was courted by - the city's two biggest outlaw biker clubs, the Spartans under Darwin Sylvester and los Bravos under Ernie Dew. In 1984, a pact had been signed by the Satan's Choice chapter in Thunder Bay, the Grim Reapers outlaw biker gang in Alberta and los Bravos gang to keep the Hells Angels out of western Canada. Stadnick regarded Winnipeg as the weakest point in the alliance and believed that if he could establish the Angels there, his club could expand into western Canada. Unlike Thunder Bay and the Albertan cities where the Grim Reapers were active, Winnipeg had two outlaw biker clubs and, moreover, both the Spartans and los Bravos largely engaged in auto theft. Stadnick offered them the possibility of selling cocaine, which required less work and was more profitable than auto theft, to the two Winnipeg outlaw biker clubs. Most of the cocaine in Canada arrived in Montreal, and Stadnick sold both clubs cocaine at prices that allowed them to make handsome profits. Stadnick used the rivalry between the Spartans and los Bravos as a way to gradually establish Hells Angels influence in Winnipeg, becoming powerful enough by 1993 to impose a truce and end the biker war in Winnipeg that began in 1991. Between 1991 and 1993, the biker war between los Bravos and the Spartans caused at least 31 acts of violence in Winnipeg. Initially, Stadnick favored the Spartans over los Bravos, which caused the latter gang to reach out to him to gain his favor. In November 1993, in what appeared to be an attempt to undermine Guindon's leadership of Satan's Choice, Stadnick met in Thunder Bay with several Satan's Choice chapter presidents, most notably Andre Wattel of the Kitchener chapter.

In January 1994, Stadnick founded a puppet club in Toronto called the Demon Keepers headed by Dany Kane, while at the same time trying to persuade the Satan's Choice and Para-Dice Riders gangs to "patch over" to become Hells Angels. On 29 January 1994, the Demon Keepers rode out from Montreal to Toronto, renting a luxury apartment in the Yonge and Eglinton district as their collective home. The Demon Keepers were all French-Canadians, most of whom could barely speak English, and their poor social skills made them stand out in Toronto. During their short existence, the Demon Keepers failed to make a single drug sale in Toronto. In April 1994, the Demon Keepers collapsed ignominiously, an experience that so embittered Kane that he decided to become an RCMP informer. Kane came to believe that Stadnick had engineered the failure of the Demon Keepers to humiliate him, but Langton argued against this theory, stating that Stadnick was desperate to have the Hells Angels enter Ontario, and the failure of the Demon Keepers set back his plans by a number of years. Stadnick's principle rival within the Hells Angels was an American living in Montreal named Scott Steinert, who was an extremely aggressive and ambitious man who aspired to be the Hells Angels' national president. Steinert mocked Stadnick for the failure of the Demon Keepers and, reflecting Stadnick's damaged status, Magnussen switched over to serving as Steinert's bodyguard. During the Quebec biker war of 1994–2002, Stadnick visited Montreal at least once a month to confer with Boucher. During his visits to Montreal, Stadnick was paranoid about being assassinated by the rival Rock Machine and always stayed at the Angels' heavily fortified clubhouse in Sorel. Regarding the Quebec biker war, Randall Richmond, the prosecutor at Stadnick's 2004 trial, stated: "This was a highly sophisticated war engaging many people, a lot of planning, preparation and money. The Hells didn't just wait until they happened to run into their enemies on the street. They hunted them down like animals."

In 1995, Stadnick had the Angels' puppet club in Montreal, the Rockers, set up a puppet club in Winnipeg called the Redliners. A Winnipeg police officer, Ray Parry, said of the Redliners: "They were the most polished. Their hair was well trimmed... The way they conducted themselves was a carbon copy of the Hells Angels' thinking at the time and was completely foreign to the way things had operated in the West." As a puppet club of a puppet club, the police reported the "triple insulation" made it difficult to tie Stadnick to the Redliners. Kane, who was secretly a RCMP informer, told his handlers in April 1995 that Stadnick was frequently making trips to Winnipeg "in order to establish a corridor for drug sales from Thunder Bay, Ontario to Winnipeg." Stadnick was also active in continuing to woo Satan's Choice in Ontario, often visiting Kitchener to meet Andre Wattel, the president of the local Satan's Choice chapter, who was most interested in joining the Hells Angels. He also went to Thunder Bay to woo the local Satan's Choice chapter. Besides chapter presidents, Stadnick continued to meet Satan's Choice national president, Guindon, taking him to dinner in the most expensive restaurants in Toronto and the most expensive strip clubs in Oshawa to press him to "patch over," however, Guindon was an intense Canadian nationalist who had rejected "patch over" offers from both the Outlaws and the Hells Angels in the 1970s and 1980s and remained opposed to having the outlaw biker club he had founded in 1965 absorbed into a larger American club. Though most Satan's Choice members favored joining the Hells Angels, Guindon would not hear of it throughout the 1990s.

On 24 June 1995, Stadnick and close friend Maurice Boucher founded the Nomad chapter with eight other members. The Nomads, which had no geographical limit, were a "dream team" of the strongest Hells Angels, serving as an elite chapter that dominated Hells Angels operations across Canada. Members of the Nomads were Stadnick, Boucher, Donald "Pup" Stockford, David "Wolf" Carroll, Gilles "Trooper" Mathieu, Richard "Bert" Mayrand, Luc Bordeleau, Pierre Laurin, Louis "Mélou" Roy, Richard "Rick" Vallée, André Chouinard, Michel Rose, Denis "Pas Fiable" Houle, Normand Robitaille, Normand "Biff" Hamel, and René "Balloune" Charlebois. Within the Nomad chapter there was an "elite within the elite" called La Table of five members with the exclusive authority to set the price for drugs. La Table was made up of Boucher, Chouinard, Rose, Houle and Robitaille. Journalist Julian Sher stated: "In Quebec, the Nomads were just the toughest and meanest and most powerful. Stadnick and his partners were able to build a pyramid structure that put the Nomads on top of all the other clubs, which you don't see anywhere else. And La Table was a powerful clique, which is why they amassed such huge fortunes." About the Nomads, Richmond stated: "They had their own special job to do. Everyone in the Nomads club had a role. But all of those roles were part of the overall picture, which was to take control of the drug market and get rich." Richmond called the Hells Angels "a pyramid scheme" under which the ordinary members risked their livelihoods and sometimes their lives while the bulk of the profits went to the Nomads.

Stadnick spent so much time in Winnipeg in the 1990s working to establish the Hells Angels on the Prairies that he rented an apartment in that city and fathered a son Damon (nomad spelled backwards) by his common-law wife. Stadnick was also regularly seen in Ontario attending outlaw biker events sponsored by both the Loners and the Satan's Choice gangs throughout the 1990s. Langton stated: "Part of Walter's genius is he went to parts of Canada where the Mafia didn't exist. There is no Mafia in Thunder Bay – but there are bikers. Same as Saskatoon and North Battleford. And you know what? People there want drugs, too." By April 1996, Kane reported that drug couriers were regularly smuggling cocaine from Montreal to Winnipeg on behalf of Stadnick. A Rocker, Stéphane Sirois, travelled with Stadnick during his trips to Winnipeg, serving as his bodyguard. Sirois later became a police informer and testified at Stadnick's trial in 2004 that the latter had told him that it was his dream to have the Hells Angels become the only outlaw biker club in all of Canada, with the "bottom rockers" (the lower part of the biker club jacket) read "Canada" instead of the provinces. Sirois testified that Stadnick had told him in 1996 that what he wanted was "The Hells Angels only, throughout Canada, with no other biker clubs." Stadnick also frequently travelled to Saskatoon to meet the leaders of the Rebels outlaw biker club to discuss having them "patch over" to become Hells Angels.

Kane's reports mentioned that Stadnick was often in conflict with Steinert and alleged that Stadnick wanted Steinert's bodyguard, Donald "Bam Bam" Magnussen, killed. Magnussen had killed David Boyko, a member of los Bravos, in a moment of drunken rage at a party in Halifax on 12 May 1996, an act which reportedly very much angered Stadnick as it set back his plans to have los Bravos "patch over" to the Hells Angels. After attending Boyko's funeral, Stadnick was denied permission to enter los Bravos' clubhouse in West Winnipeg as feelings in the gang were much against the Hells Angels. In October 1996, Kane reported to the RCMP that Stadnick had offered him $10,000 to kill Magnussen. In November 1996, Kane reported that Stadnick had told him that the Outlaws had tried to kill him in Hamilton, saying he was in his automobile and stopped for a red light when: "All of a sudden, a big member of the Outlaws got out of a pickup truck and tried to grab him." Kane also stated that Stadnick said he had noticed the other man in the truck had a gun, which caused him to drive away at high speed.

Officer Don Bell of the Ontario Provincial Police (OPP)'s Biker Enforcement Unit said of Stadnick:

He's been pretty good at eluding prosecution. Everyone knew who he was and what he was all about, but he was good at what he did. He was good at isolating himself. He worked in the depths of criminal activity and kept himself one step away, which made it difficult to collect the necessary evidence and charge him. To a biker investigator, he sort of epitomized – I hate to say this – the professionalism of the Hells Angels and the way they did business.

Stadnick once called John Gordon Harris of the Hamilton police, saying: "I need to speak to Sergeant Harris." When Harris dismissed the call as a prank, Stadnick became very angry, saying: "Yes, it's Walter Stadnick. Of course it's Walter Stadnick!" When Harris asked what the call was about, Stadnick complained a solid gold belt buckle shaped in the form of the Angels' deathhead logo had been damaged by the police, a matter that Harris knew nothing about. Stadnick then sued Harris for $500, claiming mental distress at damage that Harris allegedly did to Stadnick's golden death's head belt buckle, which ended with the judge siding with Harris. Harris called Stadnick "a hard guy to nail. You start to realize this guy is smart. He does know his way around the system, and he's got the money to afford decent lawyers. It would take a bigger organization, more than just one police department. And we had to make sure we dotted all our is and crossed all our t's and did it properly." Despite owning a home in Hamilton and his rivalry with his archenemy Parente, Stadnick never tried to create a Hells Angel chapter in Hamilton, apparently out of a desire to avoiding attracting police and media attention in his hometown. One Hamilton police detective, Steve Pacey, said: "Stadnick did not want a chapter here because it would result in more heat. Walter has been able to carry out his business for a long time. Why would he want a chapter? He doesn't need it." Stadnick had no job, but owned a house on the Cloverhill Road in Hamilton that was valued at $156,000. Stephan Frankel, the Hamilton lawyer who has represented Stadnick since 1979, replied when asked about Stadnick's job: "What does Walter do for a living? I don't know. I really don't know." Stadnick's right-hand man, a film stuntman and Hells Angel who served as the Nomad vice-president, Donald "Pup" Stockford, lived in neighboring Ancaster.

In early 1997, the Loners split into two factions, one staying loyal to national president Jimmy Raso and the other loyal to Frank Grano, breaking away to join the Para-Dice Riders. Police sources claim that Stadnick was behind the split, hoping to create a new pro-Angel club. On 31 May 1997, Johnny Papalia, the long-time leader of the Papalia family, was assassinated by Kenneth Murdock, a hitman hired by the rival Musitano family headed by the brothers' Angelo and Pasquale "Fat Pat" Musitano. On 23 July 1997, Murdock assassinated Carmen Barillaro, Papalia's right-hand man, effectively crippling the Papalia family and creating a void in the Hamilton underworld. Murdock was arrested for the murders in 1998 and turned Crown's evidence, making a plea bargain where he pledged guilty to the murders in exchange for testifying against his employers. In 2000, the Musitano brothers were convicted on the basis of Murdock's testimony. With Papalia – who hated outlaw bikers – out of the way, Stadnick moved in and in the summer of 1997 made contact with a locally prominent criminal, Gerald "Skinny" Ward who lived in Wellend. Ward, who had been tried for murder three times, was the leader of a criminal gang involved in a variety of activities such as drug dealing in the Niagara Peninsula. One police officer, Shawn Clarkson, of the Niagara Falls Police stated: "There was nobody to stand up to the Hells Angels the way Barillaro or Papalia would have. Papalia, even though he was 73 when he died, he wouldn't have put up with that."

In July 1997, Stadnick persuaded the Grim Reapers gang of Calgary to "patch over" to become Hells Angels, while also opening a new Hells Angels chapter in Edmonton, establishing the Hells Angels as the dominant outlaw motorcycle club in Alberta. On 23 July 1997, Stadnick hosted a party in Calgary that both the Calgary and Edmonton chapters of the Grim Reapers join the Hells Angels while the Rebels Motorcycle Club of Calgary became a prospective Hells Angels chapter. The King's Crew Motorcycle Club of Red Deer became a Hells Angels puppet club, making the Hells Angels at one stroke the dominant biker gang in Alberta. On 3 September 1997, Stadnick visited Toronto and met with Donny Petersen, the secretary of the Para-Dice Riders. Later that month, it emerged that four Spartans had gang-raped a teenage girl in their clubhouse. To avoid the infamy of associating with the Spartans, Stadnick threw his support behind los Bravos, granting them hang-around status with the Angels on 18 October 1997. Shortly afterwards, the Redliners joined los Bravos, which increased Stadnick's influence in los Bravos. A meeting in October 1997 at los Bravos' clubhouse in Winnipeg attended by Stadnick and Stockford, together with the Rockers and Satan's Choice Thunder Bay chapter, was described as tense, with the Rockers almost coming to blows with the Choice members. Matters calmed down subsequently when Stadnick and Stockford sat down with several Choice members. On 4 November 1997, Steinert, together with his bodyguard Magnussen, were last seen alive leaving the Lavigueur mansion where they lived to see Boucher. Their bodies were later found floating in the St. Lawrence River with their heads bashed into bloody pulps after being repeatedly hit with baseball bats and hammers.

=== Expansion ===
On 7 April 1998, Jeffrey LaBrash and Jody Hart, two leaders of the Outlaws biker gang, were gunned down leaving a strip club, the Beef Baron, by two men known to be associated with the Hells Angels in London, Ontario. LaBrash was the president of the London chapter of the Outlaws, and his killers were the brothers Paul and Duane Lewis. The significance of the killing of LaBrash and Hart was that for first time, people associated with the Hells Angels had killed within Ontario, showing the Hells Angels were deadly serious about their plans to expand into the province from Quebec. In June 1998, the Spartans gang disbanded themselves after their leader Darwin Sylvester vanished without trace. In May 1998, Sylvester went to a meeting, vanished and is generally believed to have been murdered. The man who drove Sylvester to the meeting Robert Rosmus, was murdered a few months later. A police officer stated that by 1998 Stadnick was "supplying virtually all of the drugs in Winnipeg" and had become the largest drug supplier in the three Prairie provinces.

Len Isnor of the OPP's Anti-Biker Unit once saw Stadnick at Toronto's Exhibition Grounds and was surprised to the crowd part to allow Stadnick and his bodyguards walk up to Andre Wattel, the president of Satan's Choice Kitchener chapter. The men talked for about 45 minutes and then Stadnick departed. Isnor recalled: "I had never seen anything like it. It was like he was a rock star or something."

In the summer of 1998, Standick and the entire Hells Angels chapter from Sherbrooke arrived in Niagara Falls for what the police call a crime "summit" with Ward. Ward was not an outlaw biker, but he was the leader of a locally powerful criminal gang, and Stadnick wanted to do business with him. Ward had been buying his cocaine from the Magaddino family of Buffalo, New York, and was considered to be the most powerful drug dealer in the Niagara peninsula. The Hells Angels' Sherbrooke chapter is known as one of the most violent in Canada, and Stadnick taking the entire Sherbrooke chapter with him to Niagara Falls is believed to have been an act of subtle intimidation on his part. It was agreed at the "crime summit" that henceforward Ward would only buy his drugs from the Hells Angels, thereby establishing Angels' influence in the Niagara peninsula. Clarkson stated: "I don't think (Ward) really wanted to do it, but I don't think they gave him a choice. It was either... he joined up, or the Hells Angels would bring in ten guys from Quebec to do it. That would be the last thing he'd want." Although Ward and his gang did not formally become an Angels chapter until 2000, to all intents and purposes the Ward gang were a part of the Angels from 1998 onward.

A bikers' "rodeo" was held by the shores of Lake Simcoe in August 1998, hosted by the Loners gang and attended by members of the Satan's Choice, Red Devils, Vagabonds, Last Chance and Para-Dice Riders outlaw biker clubs. The "rodeo" was interrupted when the Hells Angels' elite Nomads chapter led by Stadnick, rode in unannounced from Montreal to join in. Stadnick and the rest of the Hells Angels favored some of the bikers at the "rodeo" with their company while snubbing others. It was clear within the Ontario outlaw biker scene that henceforward one could be either for or against the Hells Angels and that the Hells Angels would be entering Ontario soon. On 7 September 1998, Stadnick persuaded the Rebels outlaw biker gang of Saskatoon to "patch over", allowing the Hells Angels to enter Saskatchewan. By the end of 1998, the only provinces without Hells Angels chapters were Manitoba, Ontario, New Brunswick, Prince Edward Island and Newfoundland.

In May 1999, Stadnick asked for the Glenn "Wrongway" Atkinson and Pietro "Peppe" Barilla of the Loners to visit him at the clubhouse of the Angels' Sherbrooke chapter, saying that the difficult relations between the Loners and Para-Dice Riders in Toronto were a matter of concern to him. During his visit, Atkinson who served as the Loners' secretary was surprised by the size of the clubhouse, which seemed more like a combination of a luxury hotel and an expensive nightclub. Atkinson-who had never met Stadnick before-was also surprised by just how much Stadnick knew of him and the other Loners as he casually mentioned that he knew the addresses of the Loners together with the names of their wives and girlfriends, which Atkinson took as a threat. Stadnick's lieutenant, David "Wolf" Carroll, was more threatening as he demanded to know why the Loners' president Gennaro "Jimmy" Raso had failed to come.

Stadnick tried to have the Loners gang of Ontario "patch over", but president of the Loners' St. Thomas chapter, Wayne Kellestine, was adamantly opposed, expelling all of the Loners who wanted to join the Hells Angels and had one pro-Hells Angels Loner beaten and pistol-whipped before he was expelled. One of the Loners in the St. Thomas chapter, Jimmy Coates, had a brother, John, who was a member of the Sherbrooke chapter of the Hells Angels, and together the Coates brothers worked against Kellestine, attempting to foment a mutiny against Kellestine's leadership of his chapter of the Loners. On 22 October 1999, in a drive-by shooting, a pro-Hells Angels Loner, Davie "Dirty" McLeish, and a Hells Angel from Sherbrooke, Philippe "Philbilly" Gastonguay, opened fire with a shotgun on Kellestine, who was sitting in his truck at a stop at the only intersection in Iona Station. McLeish and Gasonguary put several bullets into Kellestine's truck, but failed to kill him. The Globe and Mail reported in 2004 about the Hells Angels' push into south-western Ontario: "From 1999 to 2002, when the conflict reached a peak, beatings, brawls and shootings became common."

In 1999, the Hells Angels approached Danny Wolfe, the imprisoned leader of the Indian Posse gang, which is one of the largest organized crime groups in western Canada, with the offer to become exclusive wholesalers, selling the Indian Posse drugs, which in turn they would sell on the streets. Wolfe rejected the offer, saying the Indian Posse should be treated as equals to the Angels, not subordinates. In a phone call that was recorded by prison officials, Wolfe was heard to say: "We just told them [the Hells Angels], 'Hey man, we won't fucking stand in front, we won't stand behind you'. We're going to stand side by side if we do this... They wanted control. We just said 'No'. And ever since then, we had to back them off." The Indian Posse has since emerged as one of the Hells Angels' major rivals in western Canada.

=== Stadnick's triumph ===
In June 2000, La Table faction of the Nomads met with Vito Rizzuto, the boss of Canada's most powerful Mafia family, the Rizzuto family, in a Montreal restaurant to negotiate the price of cocaine in Canada It was agreed that the price of cocaine was to be $50,000 per kilogram, and Montreal was divided into territories controlled by the Rizzuto family and the Hells Angels to prevent competition between the two most powerful organized crime groups in the country. The penalty for those who sold cocaine for less than $50,000 per kilo was death. Stadnick had created a drug distribution network under which all Hells Angels chapters in Canada had to buy cocaine and other drugs from the Nomad chapter. The only exception was the Sherbrooke chapter, which uniquely was allowed to buy cocaine from the Rizzuto family directly. Stadnick's franchising business model has usually been compared to that of McDonald's under which he allowed other biker gangs to join the Angels in exchange for they had to buy their supplies from him. Sher stated: "[Stadnick] is part of that key cocaine industry that turns the Hells Angels from basically gofer boys of the Mafia into powerbrokers who are sitting down with the Mafia and negotiating the price of cocaine." By the 21st century, the five Angels' chapters in British Columbia had become the wealthiest Angel chapters in the world, with control of much of the drug smuggling into the United States.

On 21 July 2000, Stadnick promoted los Bravos, headed by Ernie Dew, up to "prospect" status from the "hang-around" status they had been granted in October 1997. The next day, Stadnick was observed by the Winnipeg police going into a strip club where he met several presidents of Satan's Choice chapters from Ontario. In the summer of 2000, Stadnick made an offer to most of the Ontario outlaw biker gangs that was too appealing for them to refuse; namely they could join the Hells Angels "patch for patch", allowing them to enter the Hells Angels with patches equivalent to their current patches. Under Stadnick's offer, current "full patch" outlaw bikers could join the Hells Angels as "full patch" members without having the humiliation of going through the "hang-around" and "prospect" stages, provided they did so by the end of the year. Putting the pressure onto Stadnick was that the rival Rock Machine had expanded out of Quebec by opening three chapters in Ontario while the same time the Rock Machine was moving towards "patching over" to join the Texas-based Bandidos, one of the "big four" American outlaw biker clubs. On 30 November 2000, Stadnick called a Montreal Nomad, David "Wolf" Carroll, to tell him over a phone line that the police were listening into: "We'll be on the South Shore at 12. I know where we'll be, but I don't want to tell you verbally." On 22 December 2000, Stadnick arranged for Dew and los Bravos gang to join the Hells Angels as "full patch" members after only five months of waiting as prospects instead of the normal year. On 29 December 2000, Stadnick arranged for a mass "patch over" in Montreal where various Ontario outlaw biker gangs all joined the Hells Angels.

On 29 December 2000, in a much publicized ceremony, most of the Ontario outlaw biker gangs such as Satan's Choice, the Vagabonds, the Lobos, the Last Chance, the Para-Dice Riders and some of the Loners travelled to Hells Angels' "mother chapter" clubhouse in Sorel, just south of Montreal to join the Hells Angels, making them at one stroke the dominant outlaw biker club in Ontario. A number of the Outlaws together with most of the Rock Machine's Ontario members led by the Rock Machine's Kingston chapter president Paul Porter also joined the Hells Angles in the same ceremony. On that day, dozens of chartered buses from Ontario arrived at the Sorel clubhouse, carrying the bikers. As a result of the mass "patch-over" in Montreal, with 168 outlaw bikers becoming Hells Angels, the greater Toronto area went from having no Hells Angels chapters to having the highest concentration of Hells Angels' chapters in the world. In terms of sheer numbers, the Canadian Hells Angels are outnumbered only by the American Hells Angels. Sher stated about the "patch over" that: "If you can't beat them, buy them. That's exactly what he did... It was a brilliant strategy."

One police officer told Langton about the mass "patch over" in Montreal: "They [the Angels] were truly scraping the bottom of the barrel. They were trading patch for patch the legendary Hells Angel patch for some of the lowest of the low." Detective George Coussens of the OPP's Anti-Biker Unit was surprised that Stadnick had taken on the Last Chance gang of Toronto and the Lobos gang of Windsor, saying: "We always felt the Hells Angels were-I hate to say it-of a different status. But when they started doing this, we thought, 'why are they taking all these mumblies?' We thought you guys were a little better than this." Coussens stated Satan's Choice and the Para-Dice Riders were "sophisticated gangs," but the Last Chance and the Lobos were "mumblies" (i.e. drug addicts who were said to mumble all the time because of their drug-addled status). A number of Outlaws and the Rock Machine bikers also went over to the Hells Angels, whom Stadnick grouped into the Hells Angels new Ottawa chapter. Unlike the rival Bandidos, who required that new members join as "prospects", Stadnick allowed the Ontario outlaw biker gangs to all join the Hells Angels "patch for patch", which was most unusual. The vast majority of the Ontario outlaw bikers clubs preferred to join the Hells Angels instead of the rival Bandidos as Stadnick allowed them to maintain their dignity with his "patch for patch" offer. Outlaw biker clubs operate in a very authoritarian, hierarchical manner, and patches are extremely important for the self-image of outlaw bikers with those having obtained "full patch" status jealously guarding their status and expecting the "prospect" and "hang-around" members to defer to them at all times. Stadnick asked for and received permission from the Hells Angels' American leaders for the mass "patch over" as only once before, in Germany in 1999, had the Hells Angels accepted en masse a number of outlaw bikers from other clubs on a "patch for patch" basis. The minutes of a Hell Angels meeting on 3 February 2001 stated: "the patch-for-patch is over tonight. We resume the... tradition as of today."

The decision to admit Ward and his gang as the Hells Angel chapter for the Niagara peninsula, despite the fact that Ward was not a biker and did not know how to ride a motorcycle, prompted some resentment, requiring Stadnick to visit Toronto, where he declared that the new Niagara chapter, as the Ward gang had become, would be only "prospects" instead of "full patch" members. The Niagara chapter under Ward became the richest Hells Angel chapter in Ontario as Ward had something very close to a monopoly on selling cocaine in the Niagara peninsula. The police estimated that Ward and the Niagara chapter were responsible for selling about 75% of cocaine in the Niagara region. David Atwell, a Para-Dice Rider turned Hells Angel who later became a police informer, last spoke with Stadnick while serving as a guard at that meeting, where he mentioned that Stadnick was cordial, but always very cagey and careful about what he said. Atwell also reported that Dew and the Winnipeg chapter expressed much resentment about the way that Stadnick had allowed the Ontario gangs to enter the Hells Angels on a "patch-for-patch" basis, unlike the way that he forced Dew had to wait three years before allowing him the "full patch."

Stadnick still refused to open a Hells Angel chapter in Hamilton, even through the city had eleven Angels living within it who all belonged to the chapters in Montreal, Toronto and Kitchener. Pacey stated: "Hells Angels influence is subtle, behind the scenes. It isn't so much in your face. I think that's the way Walter does business." Stadnick tried to maintain a respectable image in Hamilton, as he always drove his elderly parents to the local Uniate Catholic church every Sunday. The police officers who monitored him were struck by the deference that he was shown by other outlaw bikers, noting when he visited Toronto that the "hang-arounds" served as his bodyguards when he dined at expensive restaurants, standing guard outside even in the winter to keep out any would-be assassins. One Toronto police officer who monitored the 5'4 Stadnick commented: "You look at him walking down the street and you think "What he's got?""

=== Operation Springtime ===
On 28 March 2001, as part of Operation Springtime (a police crackdown on the Hells Angels), a warrant was issued for Stadnick's arrest for 13 charges of first-degree murder. During the police raid on Stadnick's house in Hamilton, Detective Pacey was surprised to find that Stadnick had a photograph of him prominently displayed in his bedroom. Found inside of Stadnick's house was a note from his 10-year-old niece that complained he spent too much time in Montreal and pointedly asked: "Are you still the leader of the Hells Angels? I hope you can move the club to Canada and out of Quebec."

It turned out that Stadnick was in Jamaica, where he was arrested by officers of the Jamaica Constabulary Force at the resort he was staying at in Montego Bay, following an extradition request from Canada. Stadnick's common-law wife accused the Jamaican police of putting him in a "hellhole" jail cell. The jail that Stadnick was held at in Montego Bay was badly overcrowded and had one bucket that served as a toilet for the entire cell block. He did not contest his extradition to Canada, returning on 10 April 2001. Langton dismissed the theory that Stadnick had advance knowledge of Operation Springtime, stating if Stadnick did know, then he would have gone to a country with no extradition treaty with Canada like Brazil rather than Jamaica, which does.

After his return to Canada, Stadnick told RCMP officer Tom O'Neill: "I don't drink much and I don't do drugs. I'm kind of a quiet guy." When O'Neill noticed that Stadnick had a "Filthy Few" tattoo – reportedly awarded to those who killed for the Hells Angels – Stadnick claimed the tattoo was because: "Oh, that's because I like to party when I stay out with the boys." When O'Neill pointed out the contradiction, Stadnick fell silent. When O'Neill asked Stadnick if he remembered Dany Kane of the Rockers, Stadnick stated he knew him, but not very well as he does not speak French. When O'Neill told him that Kane had been a police informer since 1994, he reported that Stadnick looked worried.

As part of Operation Springtime, the police seized the records from the Nomad "bank" in Montreal. The records showed that Stadnick's codename was Gertrude and that between 30 March 1999 and 19 December 2000, the Nomads had sold $111.5 million worth of cocaine and hashish all over Canada. The records also showed that Stadnick bought 267 kilograms of cocaine and 173 kilograms of hashish worth $11.1 million from the Mafia and made profits of $3 million during this period.

With Stadnick behind bars awaiting trial, a biker war broke out in southwestern Ontario between the London Outlaws chapter headed by Thomas Hughes and the Hells Angels' London chapter headed by Jimmy Coates, formerly of the Loners. In July 2002, the Angels' new national leadership consisting of Gerald Ward, president of the Niagara chapter, and Billy Miller, president of the North Toronto chapter, summoned the Coates brothers and Georges "Bo-Boy" Beaulieu, president of the Sherbrooke chapter, to a meeting in Toronto to tell them to end the violence as the Ontario market was large enough to share with other gangs, and the negative publicity was attracting unwanted attention. Ward and Miller expressed much confidence that rival clubs such as the Outlaws and the Bandidos would soon fade into irrelevance, making biker wars unnecessary. In turn, Ward and Miller were believed to acting on behalf of Stadnick.

In 2003, Stadnick was brought to trial for "13 counts of murder, 3 counts of attempted murder, 1 count of conspiracy to commit murder, two counts of narcotics trafficking and two counts of attempting to smuggle narcotics." Besides Stadnick, Donald "Pup" Stockford and another Hells Angel, Michel Rose, were also tried. In his trial in Montreal, Stadnick opted for his constitutional right to have the trial in English, and hired Edward Greenspan and Alan B. Gold as his defense lawyers. The Crown Attorney prosecuting Stadnick was Randall Richmond. Greenspan and Gold were able to delay the trial by demanding that the Crown translate all 500,000 papers of documents and ten CD-ROMs worth of evidence into English, a request that the Quebec government refused as it would cost more than $23 million. Greenspan and Gold appealed to the Supreme Court of Canada, which refused their request in January 2003 to have all the evidence translated into English given that both Greenspan and Gold were fluent in French, and Stadnick's trial started afterwards. Richmond told the court that Stadnick and Stockford were the key figures in the rise of the Hells Angels, saying: "More than anyone else in the Hells Angels, Stadnick and Stockford were the ones who worked to bring into the Hells Angels organization other motorcycle clubs in Ontario and Manitoba." Richmond argued at the trial that Stadnick was guilty of the 13 counts of first-degree murders of members of the Rock Machine because: "Just as a general is liable for any war crimes his men commit, we are convinced Stadnick knew about the murders and did nothing to stop them." However, the judge acquitted Stadnick of all 13 counts of murder saying that the Crown failed to present enough evidence that Stadnick ordered the murders.

=== Conviction ===
On September 13, 2004, Stadnick was sentenced to 20 years' imprisonment for a collection of convictions including conspiracy to murder, drug trafficking involvement in gang activities. In sentencing Stadnick and Stockford, Justice Jerry Zigman stated: "They are hardened criminals who show little or no hope of being able to straighten out their lives and cease participating in criminal activities. They are violent people who are a danger to society. They have expressed no remorse for their acts." Stadnick was "transferred from a medium to a maximum-security prison in 2006 and 2009 for illegal trafficking activities and large-scale loansharking" in a Kingston area prison.

When filing for his taxes, Stadnick never claimed more than an annual income of $35,000, but after his conviction, the Canada Revenue Agency (CRA) performed an audit of his illegally obtained income, which was also taxable. In 2006, Stadnick was reassessed by the CRA and told to pay $1.2 million in back taxes. In 2008, Stadnick filed for personal bankruptcy, claiming to be unable to afford to pay his back taxes.

Stadnick was paroled in June 2014, lasting less than a month on probation due to suspicion that he was associating with people with criminal records as well as the biker club. He was able to convince the Parole Board of Canada to reinstate his freedom in December 2014. The board ruled in December 2014: "He will have unrestricted freedom beginning April 12, 2019. Until then, Stadnick is under extremely strict conditions, including: avoid people in street and motorcycle gangs (any person known to be a hang around or wannabe of any outlaw motorcycle gang), barred from owning more than one cellphone and must show his parole officers detailed billing statements for it, including documentation of who he texts and emails and what social media sites he visits. He also can't consume alcohol or go to bars or own or operate a motorcycle or work in motorcycle repair. He must also obey a curfew that runs between 9 p.m and 6 a.m. Given his past criminal spending habits, and amounts of money within drug trafficking the Board will monitor his revenues and expenses." Another of his parole conditions was that Stadnick was not to enter Quebec. Stadnick was described as being "polite and respectful inmate", but one who refused to admit that he had been a Hells Angel or admit any guilt.

In 2018, it was reported that Stadnick was employed as a construction worker. After his parole conditions forbidding him to associate with the Hells Angels expired in April 2019, Stadnick renewed his associations. On 18 August 2019, he attended the funeral in Delta, British Columbia of a murdered Hells Angel, Suminder "Allie" Grewal.

=== Legacy ===
Despite his conviction in 2004, Stadnick had raised the Hells Angels up to such a level of dominance that the club continued to function well without him and remained the most powerful outlaw biker club in Canada. Stadnick changed the status of outlaw bikers from being subcontractors for the Mafia, which was the norm when he began his career as an outlaw biker, to being the equals of the Mafia. In 2004, Ha wrote:"...in his home province, Mr. Stadnick's legacy lives on, with 184 Hells Angels now operating in the country's largest drug market." In 2015, Detective Sergeant Len Isnor of the OPP's anti-biker unit told the media: "The Hells dominate nearly every province in the country." Peter Edwards, the crime correspondent for the Toronto Star described the Hells Angels in 2016 as the most powerful organized crime group in Canada, saying "In Ontario, you had the Hells Angels and the people the Hells Angels let exist. They either worked with you or they didn't care about you." Pierre de Champlain, an expert on bikers for the Royal Canadian Mounted Police, stated: "Since 2000, the Hells Angels have had complete control over Quebec, from Sept-Îles to Granby. No one wants to work against the Hells Angels independently because it's not in their interest." In 2016, it was estimated the Hells Angels had about 450 members with chapters in almost every province, giving them a level of dominance that no other organized crime group in Canada could match.
