= Donald Stockford =

Canadian outlaw biker and gangster

- Born: 6 May 1962 (age 64)
- Other name: "Pup"
- Occupations: Outlaw biker, stuntman
- Allegiance: Hells Angels MC (1993–)
- Convictions: Conspiracy to traffic in narcotics (2004); Conspiracy to commit murder (2004); Gangsterism (2004)
- Penalty: 20 years in prison

Donald Stockford (born 6 May 1962) is a Canadian outlaw biker, gangster and stuntman.

== Hells Angel ==
Stockford works as a stuntman for films and owned a house in Ancaster, an affluent suburb of Hamilton. He is a friend of the actor and biker Chuck Zito, who served as the president of the New York City chapter of the Hells Angels. In 1989, Stockford married Christine Yanke, by whom he had three children. Yanke stated that her husband always intended to join the Hells Angels from his teenage years onward, and he spent much time in Montreal associating with the Hells Angels. In 1992, Stockford left Ancaster to live in Montreal for a year as a Hells Angel "prospect" (the second level in an outlaw biker club).

On 26 May 1993, Stockford joined the Hells Angels Montreal chapter as a "full patch" member. He was a close associate of the Hells Angels national president Walter Stadnick. Like Stadnick, Stockford continued to live in Ontario and made trips to Montreal to attend meetings of his chapter. Also like Stadnick, he does not speak French and required the services of translators to speak to the fellow members of his chapter. Stockford together with Stadnick frequently visited Montreal during the Quebec biker war to meet Maurice Boucher and other Hells Angels leaders in la belle province. Stockford was able to support Yanke as a housewife and stay-at-home mother while also owning a house in the middle-class town of Ancaster. Yanke stated she never asked any questions about his work for the Hells Angels and that he would frequently leave for extended periods of time for Hells Angels-related work.

On 25 June 1995, Stockford became a founding member of the Angels' elite Nomad chapter. Besides Stockford, the other members of the Nomad chapter were Stadnick, Boucher, Scott Steinert, David "Wolf" Carroll, Gilles "Trooper" Mathieu, Richard "Bert" Mayrand, Luc Bordeleau, Pierre Laurin, Louis "Mélou" Roy, Richard "Rick" Vallée, André Chouinard, Michel Rose, Denis "Pas Fiable" Houle, Normand Robitaille, Normand "Biff" Hamel, and René "Balloune" Charlebois. Stockford alongside Stadnick and Carroll were the only English-Canadians in the otherwise all French-Canadian Nomad chapter. Stockford served as the vice-president of the Nomad chapter while Boucher served as the chapter president.

Stockford also owned a strippers' agency. Quebec has long been a net exporter of strippers, and Stockford along with Steinert were very aggressive in sending French-Canadian strippers to work in northern Ontario. The strippers he supplied to various bars in northern Ontario served as spies for the Hells Angels who identified the local criminal element. Once identified, Stockford sent out a representative to contact the individual and to see if they were willing to buy drugs from the Hells Angels.

The police informer Dany Kane reported to his handlers that on 20 February 1996 Stockford and Carroll had a meeting in Saint-Sauveur to discuss plans to ship narcotics from Montreal to the greater Toronto area. Kane reported: "Their goal was to take a big part of the Toronto drug market". On 3 May 1996, Kane reported that Stockford had sent a drug courier from Montreal to Toronto with one kilogram of cocaine; about 1,000 ecstasy pills; and four kilograms of hashish. Kane further stated the courier had to page a number and press 1 for a pick-up at the Holiday Inn or 2 for a pick-up at the Ramada Inn. Kane reported that afterwards the courier was to go to Tim Horton's coffee shop on Bronte Road, dial another number and press 17 to arrange for a cousin of Stockford to arrive to pick up the drugs. On 29 November 1996, Kane wrote in a report that Stockford had sent 300 kilograms of hashish to Hamilton, and in another report in January 1997 stated that he had sent four kilograms of cocaine to Oshawa.

Kane reported that the local Outlaws chapter in Hamilton under the leadership of Mario Parente was furious with losing market share to the Hells Angels Stadnick and Stockford. Kane stated that Stockford had told him that he received a knock on his door at his Ancaster house from a pizza deliveryman despite not having ordered any pizza. Stockford told Kane that he believed this was a murder attempt by the Outlaws and that, if he had answered the door, someone would have tried to kill him.

The financial records of the Nomad chapter that were later seized by the police showed that between 30 March 1999 and 19 December 2000, Stockford and Stadnick spent $10 million to buy 265 kilograms of cocaine and 173 kilograms of hashish from the Rizzuto family and the West End Gang. On 16 December 2000, the police observed Stockford talking with leaders of Satan's Choice and the Para-Dice Riders biker gangs. Later that same month, on 29 December 2000, the Satan's Choice, Para-Dice Riders, Lobos and Last Chance gangs all joined the Hells Angels, making them at one stroke the dominant biker gang in Ontario.

== Operation Springtime ==
On 28 March 2001, as part of Operation Springtime, Stockford was arrested at his house in Ancaster. Found inside of Stockford's house were hundreds of plastic cards with the names of all Hells Angels members in Canada together with pager numbers for the fellow members of the Nomad chapter and all other chapter presidents in Canada. Finally, the police found a tax return for the year 2000 for Nomads Quebec, Inc that listed Maurice Boucher as the Nomad chapter president and Stockford as vice-president.

At his trial in Montreal in 2003 and 2004, Stockford was defended by Edward Greenspan and Alan B. Gold, two of Canada's best-known lawyers. Stockford and Stadnick chose to exercise their constitutional right for a trial in English, which presented major problems as there was a shortage in Quebec of Anglo Crown Attorneys to prosecute the accused together with Anglo judges. Another member of the Nomad chapter, Michel Rose, as part of the same trial, insisted on having his trial in English even though Rose could just barely speak English. The judge selected for the trial was Justice Jerry Zigman, who was one of the last Anglo (English-speaking) judges left in Quebec. The Crown Attorney selected for a trial was Randall Richmond, a native of Hamilton who had settled in Montreal. The case against Rose was later severed when Zigman ruled that Rose did not know enough English to understand what was being said in the courtroom. The major evidence presented by the Crown were the financial records of the Nomad chapter which Kane had stolen shortly before his suicide. The records showed that the Nomad chapter had handled $111,503,361 in purchasing drugs over an eight-month period in 1999 and 2000 and that $10 million had gone to Stadnick and Stockford.

In April 2004, the Crown's case against Stadnick and Stockford was badly weakened when the Crown's star witness, the hitman Stéphane "Godasse" Gagné, testified. Gagné had worked as a hitman for the Hells Angels before turning Crown's evidence after his arrest in December 1997. Instead of testifying against Stadnick and Stockford, Gagné went on an extended rant about how the Crown had not in his opinion honored its agreement with him when he agreed to turn Crown's evidence in 1997, complaining he felt cheated. The attempts by Richmond to have Gagné to testify about the matter at hand were completely unsuccessful. Gagné's lengthy rant on the stand about how badly he felt treated by the Crown and his unwillingness to testify in support of the Crown's thesis that he committed his murders on the orders of Stadnick and Stockford effectively derailed the Crown's case on the first-degree murder charges.

The trial ended in June 2004 with Stockford being acquitted of all 13 first-degree murder charges, but he and Stadnick were convicted on charges of conspiracy to traffic in narcotics. Stockford was also convicted of conspiracy to commit murder and gangsterism. Prior to his convictions, Stockford had no criminal record, and Stadnick had been convicted of trafficking narcotics and carrying a concealed weapon. In sentencing Stadnick and Stockford, Justice Jerry Zigman stated: "They are hardened criminals who show little or no hope of being able to straighten out their lives and cease participating in criminal activities. They are violent people who are a danger to society. They have expressed no remorse for their acts." After his conviction, Stockford was sentenced to 20 years in prison and fined $100,000. Zigman also factored time served in jail prior to the conviction, which reduced the number of years that Stockford was to serve in prison.

During his time in prison, Stockford remained faithful to the Hells Angels. In September 2014, the National Parole Board ruled Stockford had to live in a half-way house while on parole, stating, "You clearly decided to adopt criminality as your lifestyle and you took cold-blooded decisions to achieve your goals and there is nothing in your file to suggest that you have changed". In 2020, Stockford joined the Sherbrooke chapter of the Hells Angels.

== Books ==
- Auger, Michel; Edwards, Peter (2012). The Encyclopedia of Canadian Organized Crime: From Captain Kidd to Mom Boucher. Toronto: McClelland & Stewart. ISBN 978-0771030499.
- Cherry, Paul (2006). The Biker Trials: Bringing Down the Hells Angels. Toronto: ECW Press. ISBN 978-1550226386.
- Langton, Jerry (2006). Fallen Angel: The Unlikely Rise of Walter Stadnick and the Canadian Hells Angels. Toronto: Harper Collins. ISBN 144342725X.
- Langton, Jerry (2010). Showdown: How the Outlaws, Hells Angels and Cops Fought for Control of the Streets. Toronto: John Wiley. ISBN 978-0470678787.
- Lavigne, Yves (1999). Hells Angels at War. Toronto: HarperCollins. ISBN 0002000245.
- Schneider, Stephen (2009). Iced: The Story of Organized Crime in Canada. Toronto: John Wiley & Sons. ISBN 978-0470835005.
- Sher, Julian; Marsden, William (2003). The Road To Hell How the Biker Gangs Are Conquering Canada. Toronto: Alfred Knopf. ISBN 0-676-97598-4.
