= Maurice Boucher =

Canadian outlaw biker and gangster (1953–2022)

- 2015 prison photo
- Born: 21 June 1953; Causapscal, Quebec, Canada
- Died: 10 July 2022 (aged 69); Sainte-Anne-des-Plaines, Quebec, Canada
- Other name: "Mom"
- Occupations: Outlaw biker; crime boss
- Years active: 1973–2002
- Known for: President of the Quebec Nomads Hells Angels chapter
- Spouse: Diane Leblanc (common law)
- Children: 4
- Allegiance: SS MC (1982–1986); Hells Angels MC (1987–2014)
- Convictions: Armed robbery (1975); Rape (1984); Attempted murder and two counts of first-degree murder (2002); Conspiracy to commit murder (2018)
- Penalty: 40 months' imprisonment (1975); 40 months' imprisonment (1984); Life imprisonment, with no possibility of parole for at least 25 years (2002); 10 years (2018)

Maurice Boucher (21 June 1953 – 10 July 2022) was a Canadian gangster, convicted murderer, reputed drug trafficker, and outlaw biker. He was once president of the Quebec Nomads chapter of the Hells Angels Motorcycle Club. Boucher led Montreal's Hells Angels against the rival Rock Machine biker gang during the Quebec Biker War (French: Guerre des motards au Québec) of 1994 through 2002 in Quebec, Canada. In 2002, Boucher was convicted on two counts of first degree murder for ordering the murders of two Quebec prison officers in an effort to destabilize the Quebec Justice system.

He was sent to serve three life sentences at Canada's only supermax prison, in Sainte-Anne-des-Plaines. While imprisoned there, Boucher survived several assassination attempts motivated by his infamy, and was placed in a special unit of the prison to isolate him. Authorities transferred him in June 2022 to the nearby Archambault Institution under conditions of secrecy so he could receive palliative care following the metastasis of his throat cancer. He died 10 July 2022.

Boucher had three sons and one daughter. Among them, Alexandra Mongeau (who uses her mother's surname) and Francis Boucher have also been involved in organized crime.

== Early life ==
Born in Causapscal, Quebec, Canada, Boucher was raised in poverty in the Hochelaga-Maisonneuve borough of inner-city Montreal, where his family moved when he was two years old. Boucher was the oldest of eight children: three sons and five daughters; his father, Albert Boucher (1926–2006), was a construction worker while his mother, Claire Boily (1935–2009), stayed at home to raise their eight children. Boucher's father was an alcoholic who frequently beat his wife and children. His mother was described as the main source of love during his childhood. Albert Boucher was described as "a severe man who tolerated no lip from his children" and imposed an "iron discipline" on his eight children. In the 1960s and 1970s, the construction industry in Quebec was dominated by the Mafia-linked union boss André "Dédé" Desjardins, known as le roi de la construction ("the king of construction"), who ran the Conseil des métiers de la construction union quite brutally. The world that Boucher grew up in was a world where violence was commonplace and where corruption was accepted as normal. Boucher's school report cards describe him as an indifferent student and he dropped out of school in grade 9 to work odd jobs. In her memoir, Boucher's daughter, Alexandra Mongeau, recounted that Boucher confided in her that he was a victim of bullying at school and that he was sexually abused by Catholic priests as a child.

In April 1973, the 19-year-old Boucher committed his first known crime, when he stole $200 from a dépanneur. In July 1974, Boucher got a certificate allowing him to work in the construction industry, but he only lasted a week before being fired due to problems caused by his heavy drinking and drug use.

Unhappy with his income and desperate to support his drug habit, he turned to crime. He was arrested for three break and enters in the fall of 1974 and served nearly six months in detention. The first known crime committed by Boucher as an adult was on the night of 5 November 1974, when he broke into a grocery store in the Hochelaga-Maisonneuve district and attempted to steal 23 cartons of cigarettes but was caught by police upon exiting the store in possession of the cartons. It was during this time that Boucher's girlfriend, Diane Leblanc, was pregnant. By his own admission, Boucher was addicted to alcohol and marijuana and he often used cocaine, amphetamines, LSD, and heroin, though he stated to a police psychologist, Martin Pellerin, in February 1975 that he stopped using hard drugs in September 1974. In February 1975, Boucher was interviewed by Pellerin who described him as an ambitious man who wanted to get rich without working. Boucher told Pellerin that he would have liked to have followed his father into the construction trade, but the economic recession caused by the Arab oil shock of 1973–74 had made work very hard to find. Pellerin also described Boucher as lacking emotional empathy as a result of his abusive childhood, saying he was a very cold-hearted individual who regarded violence as acceptable behaviour.

On 5 November 1975, Boucher committed an armed robbery but was caught and sentenced to 40 months in prison. Boucher went into a butcher's shop armed with a rifle and stole $138.38, but because he used a gun with the robbery, the court imposed a stiff sentence. In December 1978, Boucher and his younger brother, Christian, were arrested for a series of home invasions, and for beating up the owner of one of the homes they had robbed. In July 1979, Boucher got a job working at a plastic factory in Montreal, which he held for four years, which was the longest period of legitimate employment in his entire life. In December 1981, Boucher was again charged with a home invasion, but the charges were dropped when the victim refused to testify against him in court.

Around 1982, Boucher was a member of a white supremacist motorcycle gang named the SS who were based in Pointe-aux-Trembles, on the eastern tip of the Island of Montreal. The SS were a group of men of working-class background who were strongly opposed to non-white immigration and initially their activities were limited to beating up non-white immigrants in order to make them go back to their countries of origin. A fellow member of the SS was Salvatore Cazzetta; the two became friends. As leaders of the gang, they became candidates to join the Hells Angels when the Angels decided to expand its operations into the rest of Canada. One of the members of the SS was one Normand "Biff" Hamel, who was to follow Boucher into the Hells Angels; it was Hamel, whose first conviction for drug dealing was in 1978, who introduced the SS gang to the drug trade. Hamel argued that this was a more profitable form of activity than beating up non-white immigrants. Hamel argued that however enjoyable it might be to beat up nonwhite immigrants, this did not make the SS biker gang any money. Right up until his murder in 2000, Hamel was described as Boucher's principal business partner.

It was during his time in the SS that Boucher, until then an undistinguished petty criminal, first showed the charisma and ability to lead that later marked his time in the Hells Angels. One of Boucher's most consistent enemies, Commander André Bouchard of the Montreal police, who first encountered Boucher in the 1970s, described Boucher during his time in the SS: "He was muscle. He was a crazy fucker. They'd send him out to beat up some guy. He was stoned half the time". Bouchard stated: "Mom [Boucher] at that time had aspirations. He was ambitious—and vicious". The journalist James Dubro stated about the distinctive outlaw biking sub-culture in Quebec: "There's always has been more violence in Quebec. In the biker world it's known as the Red Zone. I remember an Outlaws hit man telling me he was scared going to Montreal."

Commander Bouchard described Boucher as a man who loved publicity and who was always smiling for the cameras. Bouchard stated:

He'd do it on purpose, come out of the funeral parlor, stand with ten or twelve of his guys, look right into the cameras and smile and wave. But he never talked. Because I'll tell you honestly, he can't put two words together.

However, Bouchard also said:

He's very intelligent in the way he runs people. He's got a very high leadership quality. If he were straight [legitimate] he'd be a great manager for any business... He rules by fear. People respect him because they fear him. They don't respect him because he's respectable.

In March 1985, the Sorel (Montreal South) chapter of the Hells Angels suspected the Laval (Montreal North) chapter of wasting drug profits by using too much of the product themselves and ripping off the Nova Scotia chapter of $96,000. The Laval chapter was invited to a Sorel chapter party in Sherbrooke. When the five Laval members arrived, they were ambushed and murdered. Two months later, divers located the decomposing bodies of the victims wrapped in sleeping bags and tied to weightlifting plates at the bottom of the St. Lawrence River. What became known as the Lennoxville massacre was considered extreme even for the criminal underworld, and it gave Quebec's Hells Angels a notorious reputation. Boucher was impressed with the Lennoxville massacre, which proved to him that the Angels were sufficiently ruthless for his tastes, and only criticized Réjean "Zig Zag" Lessard, the man behind the massacre, for sparing three Angels from the Laval chapter instead of killing them. Bouchard stated that Boucher stopped his substance abuse after the Lennoxville massacre, which was prompted because of the heavy drug use of the Montreal North chapter, saying "He got the message and a lot of them got the message. It scared the shit out of them".

Cazzetta found the ambush—essentially, biker "brothers" killing their own—to be an unforgivable breach of the outlaw code. He refused Boucher's offer to join him at the top of the Quebec Hells Angels, and instead formed his own smaller gang—the Rock Machine—with his brother Giovanni Cazzetta in 1986. In the aftermath of the massacre, Yves "Apache" Trudeau, the Angels' leading killer, turned Crown's evidence and his testimony sent 39 Angels to prison. The late 1980s was a period of flux for the Angels in Quebec, and Boucher rose very rapidly through the ranks. Laurent Viau of the Laval chapter had been killed in the Lennoxville massacre, Réjean Lessard of the Sorel chapter had been convicted of first-degree murder for ordering the Lennoxville massacre, and Angels' national president Michel "Sky" Langois fled to Morocco to escape charges of first-degree murder relating to the massacre.

== Hells Angels ==
In September 1984, Boucher held a gun to the head of a 16-year-old girl and threatened to kill her on the spot if she did not have sex with him, leading to his conviction for armed sexual assault. During his time in prison, Boucher managed to illegally collect unemployment insurance. It was not until shortly before he was to be released in January 1986 that a clerk finally noticed that the address the cheques were being mailed to was a prison. In 1986, soon after finishing his 40-month sentence for the armed sexual assault, Boucher joined the Hells Angels motorcycle club in Montreal, and quickly rose through its ranks. Normand "Biff" Hamel joined the Angels just a few months before Boucher did. Hamel served as Boucher's sponsor. On 1 May 1987, Boucher became a "full patch" member of the Hells Angels, just three days after the murder of Martin Huneault, a leader of a rival outlaw biker gang, the Death Riders. It is widely believed that Boucher killed Huneault to become a "full patch" member of the Angels' Montreal chapter, the oldest and most prestigious Angel chapter in Canada. Huneault had been watching a hockey game and drinking with his girlfriend in a Laval bar when somebody marched in and shot him three times; none of the people in the bar who witnessed the crime were willing to testify that the gunman was Boucher and thus no criminal charges were filed against him. Huneault had been opposed to the Death Riders working with the Hells Angels. With Huneault's murder, the Death Riders became a Hells Angels puppet club, giving the Angels control of the drug trade in Laval.

The Canadian crime journalist Jerry Langton described Boucher as "big and strong and not afraid to fight anyone. And smart and charismatic, even charming and could get along with just about anyone". One Hells Angel who later turned Crown's evidence, Serge Boutin, testified at Boucher's trial in 2002: "Monsieur Boucher was considered like a god. When I'd see other Hells Angels around him, they were full of admiration". Boucher had the nickname "Mom" because of his attention to detail, as he pestered his men with questions to make certain that they thought of everything, just like a loving, but overbearing mother. Boucher's other nickname was Les Lunettes, because his glasses made him look like a graduate student. When Walter "the Nurget" Stadnick became the national president of the Canadian Hells Angels in April 1988, he appointed Boucher his Quebec lieutenant. Stadnick and Boucher went to Quebec City on 28 May 1988 to meet the leaders of an outlaw biker club called the Vikings, who agreed to "patch over" to become the Hells Angels Quebec City chapter the same night. Described as a "natural born leader", Boucher excelled as Stadnick's Quebec lieutenant.

In 1988, Boucher went to Mississauga, Ontario, where he hijacked a truck and attempted to drive it back to Montreal, being arrested by the Peel Regional Police before getting very far. In a highly unusual move, the Crown agreed to have the case tried in Montreal instead of Mississauga and Boucher's $10,000 bail was paid for by another Angel, Normand Hamel, who managed a company importing coffee from Costa Rica. Hamel's company, Irazu Inc, was owned by a senior citizen named Richard Muselle, who did not get out very much, and in whose home was later found millions of dollars. The Angels liked to hide the cash from their criminal activities at Muselle's house out of the belief that neither rival criminals nor the police would search the home of an elderly, frail and rarely seen man. On 15 September 1989, Boucher had the Hells Angels firebomb the clubhouse of the rival Outlaws gang in Danville. The next day, Darquis Leblanc, the president of the Outlaws' Danville chapter whose clubhouse had just been incinerated, met with Boucher at the Angels' clubhouse in Sorel and asked to defect. Boucher told him that as a "full patch" Outlaw, it was out of the question for him to join the Hells Angels as the Angels never accept "full patch" Outlaws, but stated that he could be an Angel associate, an offer Leblanc accepted. Leblanc served as an Angel agent within the Outlaws, supplying intelligence as the Hells Angels and their puppet club, the Evil Ones, started to take over territories controlled by the Outlaws in 1989 and 1990. In 1989, Boucher was charged with lying to a police officer, and given a choice between paying the $200 fine or going to prison for four months; for reasons that remain unclear, he chose the latter, being released in March 1990. Boucher's activities attracted little attention from the police who assumed that the Hells Angels were finished following the convictions of 21 Hells Angels in the late 1980s.

On 15 September 1990, Claude Meunier, the president of Outlaws' Montreal chapter, was assassinated in a drive-by shooting, taking four bullets to his chest. At Meunier's funeral, Leblanc was nearly lynched by other Outlaws who accused him of betraying Meunier to the Angels. Shortly afterwards, Tony Mentore, Meunier's right-hand man, was approached by a young man with a map who was apparently lost. The young man had a handgun hidden under the map and used it to shoot Mentore three times in the head. In November 1990, Boucher was discovered by the police to be carrying a 38-caliber handgun, paying the $900 fine rather than serve five months in prison. By December 1990, the Outlaws had been virtually driven out of Quebec by Boucher. By that time, the total Outlaws in Quebec numbered only ten as most of had quit following the murders of Meunier and Mentore. The Quebec Outlaws leader, Jean "Sonny" Lacombre, was living as a recluse, only leaving his house with his two bodyguards. With the Outlaws reduced down to powerlessness in Quebec, Boucher no longer needed Leblanc. On the night of 21 February 1991, the bullet-ridden corpses of Leblanc and his brother-in-law, Yvan Martel, were found lying in the snow less than 100 feet from the Angels' clubhouse in Sorel. The automobiles of both Leblanc and Martel were found in the parking lot of the Angels' clubhouse. When questioned by the police, Boucher denied knowing either Leblanc or Martel.

By the early 1990s, he was considered one of the most powerful bikers in the province, and was involved in numerous lucrative criminal activities such as cocaine trafficking and loan sharking. On 26 March 1992, Boucher founded the Rockers Motor Club, the Hells Angels' puppet club in Montreal that was to be responsible for most of the murders committed in the Quebec biker war, with hopes of being promoted up to Hells Angels. Francis Boucher, the oldest son of Maurice, followed his father into racist activism. Francis Boucher was the president of the Sorel chapter of the White Power Canada group as well being a member of the Quebec Ku Klux Klan youth wing. On 31 July 1992, Francis Boucher at the age of 17 organized a Nazi rally, the Aryan Festival '92, which attracted much negative publicity and was also one of the first times his father was mentioned in the Quebec media.

In September 1992, the Royal Canadian Mounted Police (RCMP) started an investigation, codenamed Project Jaggy, of a drug smuggling operation run jointly by the Mafia and the Hells Angels to bring in cocaine from Jamaica, which in turn originated in Venezuela. In March 1993, Boucher paid a $500 fine after he was pulled over by a traffic cop and found with martial arts weapons in his car, violating the court order forbidding him to have any weapons. On 25 May 1993, a surveillance team from the RCMP took photographs of Boucher, wearing his Hells Angels colors, meeting Raynald Desjardins, the right-hand man of Vito Rizzuto, the leader of the Rizzuto crime family, one of the most powerful Mafia families in Canada. Desjardins had lunch with Rizzuto every Sunday at the Buffet Roma restaurant; it was reported that Rizzuto had a strong distaste for associating with outlaw bikers. Jean-Pierre Boucher (no relation to Maurice) of the RCMP who ran Project Jaggy stated: "Raynald and Mom were really good friends. Every time Quebec City did something wrong, Raynald called Mom to solve the problem". A boat, the Fortune Endeavor, was making regular trips from Jamaica to Quebec City to smuggle cocaine, and as part of the investigation, police wiretaps showed that Boucher and Desjardins were speaking on the phone on an almost daily basis in the summer of 1993. On 17 August 1993, an RCMP surveillance team recorded Boucher arriving at the Montreal headquarters of Desjardins's company, Amusements Deluxe, and then stepping into a car that took him to an unknown location; on the previous day, the Fortune Endeavor was due to arrive in Halifax and to forestall an unexpected inspection by Customs Canada after the boat had suffered an engine failure at sea, the crew had dumped 750 kilograms (1650 lb) of cocaine placed inside airtight plastic pipes off the coast of Nova Scotia. In the following days, a team of Hells Angels from Quebec arrived in Nova Scotia and wearing scuba gear tried to find the cocaine, which was finally located instead by the Canadian Navy. Desjardins was charged with conspiracy to smuggle the cocaine, but Boucher was not.

== Quebec Biker War ==
=== Starting the war ===
In 1994, following the arrest of Salvatore Cazzetta on charges of conspiring to import 200 kg (440 lbs) of cocaine, the Rock Machine was rendered temporarily leaderless. Boucher, by now president of the Montreal chapter of the Hells Angels, decided to make his move against the Rock Machine and other independent dealers. His ultimate aim was to establish a Hells Angels monopoly over street-level, biker gang drug-dealing in the Montreal area—and eventually, all of Quebec. Boucher had the two Hells Angel puppet clubs, the Evil Ones and the Rockers, to start moving into markets controlled by the Rock Machine.

Boucher persuaded Rock Machine controlled bars and their resident drug dealers to surrender their illegal drug business or their resistance would lead to bloodshed. On 14 July 1994, two members of the Hells Angels' top puppet club, the Rockers, entered a downtown motorcycle shop and shot down a Rock Machine associate. This would be the spark that would set off the Quebec Biker war. During the Quebec biker war, the Angels' national president Woldumir "Walter the Nurget" Stadnick remained in the background while Boucher became the public face of the Angels, to the extent that Stadnick's name was almost never mentioned by the media. In 1984, Stadnick was involved in an incident when he drove his Harley-Davidson motorcycle into a car driven by a Catholic priest, causing a fire that left him with severe burns and a hideously deformed face. Given that Stadnick did not speak French and his grotesquely deformed face was as far from being telegenic as possible, the Quebec media preferred to focus on the charismatic French-Canadian Boucher. In what appeared to be a division of labour, Stadnick was in charge of expanding the Angels into Ontario and the Prairies while bringing the Angel chapters in British Columbia which answered to the Hells Angels chapter in Seattle under control of the Montreal chapter while Boucher had the task of fighting the Quebec biker war. As Stadnick spoke no French and Boucher no English, police wiretaps showed that the two men needed interpreters to communicate. In the summer of 1994, Boucher first met Stéphane Gagné. Gagné, a Grade 7 drop-out from the same Hochelaga-Maisonneuve neighbourhood of Montreal that Boucher came from and a long-time drug dealer and thief, met Boucher while walking down Sherbrooke Street and agreed to buy his drugs from the Hells Angels. Boucher spoke to Gagné in his usual foul-mouthed coded language, supplemented by his various hand gestures, and the meeting ended with Gagné pointing to his nose (meaning he wanted to buy cocaine) and then touching Boucher's arm (meaning he wanted to buy the cocaine from him), leading Boucher to point at a Rocker who was with him, Paul Fontaine (meaning that Gagné was now working for Fontaine). Boucher in his drive to monopolize the drug trade took on not only the Rock Machine, but other groups such as the Pelletier clan, which served to escalate the violence as most of the drug dealers of Montreal banded together to found an alliance against the Angels.

On 17 October 1994, Dany Kane, a Rocker and a protégé of Boucher's lieutenant David "Wolf" Carroll contacted Interpol's office in Ottawa, saying he knew much about the Angels and wanted to sell information. The Interpol office had Kane meet Staff Sergeant Jean-Pierre Lévesque of the Royal Canadian Mounted Police (RCMP), who appointed Corporal Pierre Verdon and Sergeant Gaeten St. Onge to be his handlers. At their first meeting on 4 November 1994, Kane told Verdon that Boucher was a very dangerous man who was much feared by the other Angels, who was planning to murder anyone and everyone who might oppose him in his plans to take over the drug trade in Quebec. Kane described Boucher's right-hand man, an American living in Montreal named Scott Steinert as a very aggressive man who was buying stolen dynamite to build bombs. On 14 November 1994, Verdon wrote that Kane had told him: "Biff Hamel, another HA [Hells Angel] Montreal member, is the main associate of 'Mom' Boucher. These two have very good relations with the top level of the Italians [the Rizzuto family] and are considered the richest members of HA Montreal". In another report, Verdon wrote that Kane had stated: "Mom Boucher hands out the execution orders for the current war with the Rock Machine. Steinert is the executioner".

Kane worked as an RCMP informer from 1994 to 1997 and again in 1999–2000, and his weekly reports to Verdon are the main source of information about Boucher's actions during the Quebec Biker war. Kane was leading a double life in more than one sense, as the ostensibly straight Kane was having a secret relationship with another Rocker, Aimé Simard. In his turn, Kane told the RCMP that Boucher would pay more than double a policeman's weekly salary for information, that much of the Service de police de la Ville de Montréal was on his payroll, and Boucher had often boasted to him because he had a high ranking detective working for him that he knew everything that the police knew about him. In 2013, Boucher's source was finally revealed to be Detective Benoît Roberge, the man in charge of stopping the biker war, who in 2014 pleaded guilty to charges of gangsterism, as he admitted to selling information in exchange for $125,000.

According to Kane's reports, Boucher was the man behind the "Thor affair" that did so much to discredit the Sûreté du Québec in the 1990s. In April 1994, a Norwegian container ship, the Thor 1, arrived in Montreal. Acting on an anonymous tip, the Sûreté du Québec raided the Thor 1 and found 26.5 tons of hashish hidden just where the anonymous caller said it would be found. On the basis of what was found on the Thor 1, Gerry Matticks, the boss of the Irish-Canadian West End Gang that controlled the Port of Montreal was charged with conspiracy to import drugs in May 1994. The case collapsed in court when Matticks's lawyers established that the Sûreté du Québec had planted evidence, most notably documents written in French that were found in Matticks' home. Matticks was born into a poor family of Irish immigrants in 1940 in one of Montreal's worst slums, had never attended school, spoke English as his first language, was illiterate, and was quite incapable of writing anything in either French or English. The fall-out from the Thor affair was a royal commission headed by Justice Lawrence Poitras which criticized the Sûreté du Québec for routinely engaging in unprofessional practices such as planting evidence, threatening witnesses, and perjury in court. Kane's notes state that Boucher had placed the anonymous call and bribed the Sûreté du Québec detectives to plant the evidence, as this would be a "win-win" for him. If Matticks was convicted, he would eliminate a potential rival or if Matticks' lawyers exposed the planted evidence, the resulting backlash would discredit the Sûreté du Québec. Kane wrote to his handlers: "He [Boucher] told me he was the person behind the Poitras inquiry and not even the Matticks brothers know that and that he paid the lawyers for getting the shit out for the Poitras inquiry".

=== The Nomads ===
In January 1995, Boucher decided to start a new Hells Angels chapter which he would lead. The Hells Angels Nomads chapter was a group made up of the most powerful Hells Angels in Quebec and not bound by geographical locations like other Hells Angels chapters. Boucher was the sole president of the Nomad chapter in name, but in practice the Nomads were led by the triumvirate of David "Wolf" Carroll (responsible for Atlantic Canada), Boucher (responsible for Quebec), and Stadnick (responsible for the rest of Canada). According to Kane, Boucher had told him that the Nomads were going to be "plus rock n' roll" (more daring, exciting, and harder-edged—more at liberty to act at will rather than according to club rules). The journalists Julian Sher and William Marsden translated plus rock n'roll as "...meaning they would be dangerous even by biker standards". Kane reported that the members selected for the Nomad chapter were Boucher, Walter Stadnick, David "Wolf" Carroll, Scott Steinert, Normand "Biff" Hamel, Gilles "Trooper" Mathieu, Louis "Mélou" Roy, and Donald "Pup" Stockford". The clubhouse for the Nomad chapter was located on Bennett Street in the shadow of the Olympic Stadium and was very near to Boucher's favorite gym, the Pro-Gym. The Nomad chapter purchased cocaine in large quantities such as 1,000 kilograms (2000 lb) at a time from the Rizzuto family and the West End Gang. With the exception of the Sherbrooke chapter, all other Hells Angels chapters in Canada were required to buy their cocaine from the Nomad chapter.

Kane described Boucher as a much more self-disciplined man than he had been in the 1970s, saying that he only consumed alcohol and otherwise avoided all drugs and that he always got up early in the morning to meet other Angels at about 9:30 am. Cleverly, Boucher usually paid his lawyer to be present at his meetings with other Angels, thus technically making these meetings between a client and his lawyer, meaning the police could not record these meetings as that would violate solicitor-client confidentiality. Boucher purchased a mansion in the south end of Montreal, complete with gardens and stables for his horses. Boucher was also active as a real estate developer in Mexico, owning several properties in Acapulco and often hosted parties attended by senior officers of the extremely corrupt Acapulco police department. Kane reported that Boucher spent much time in Mexico as he was unable to enter the United States owing to his criminal record. When filing his income taxes, Boucher variously gave his occupation as a chef, construction worker, used car salesman, and real estate developer. A great fan of Luciano Pavarotti and Phil Collins, Boucher always purchased front-row seats whenever those artists played in Montreal. Boucher's mistress, Louise Mongeau, took a familiar tone with him, calling him minou ("kitty") and mon p'tit chaton ("my little kitten").

Despite his background in the white supremacist gang, the SS, Boucher's bodyguard was the Haitian immigrant Gregory "Picasso" Woolley, who was also reputed to be the best assassin working for the Angels. Woolley is known as "Picasso" in the Montreal underworld because it is said that he is such an artist when it comes to killing, having first killed at the age of 17 when he knifed another Haitian immigrant and gang member to death. Woolley was said to have done such an "exquisite" job at carving up his rival that he earned the nickname "Picasso", and he was ultimately made the president of the Rockers by Boucher, becoming the first black man to ever head an outlaw biker club in Canada. Boucher's principal contact with the Rizzuto family was Guy Lepage, who had served with the Service de police de la Ville de Montréal from 1966 to 1974, and was dismissed for associating with Mafiosi. As a former policeman, Lepage could not join the Hells Angels as the Angels do not accept current or former law enforcement personnel into their ranks, but he did join the Rockers. Lepage also enlisted the help of the Craigs, a couple consisting of Raymond Craig and his Bolivian wife Sandra, to assist with importing drugs from South America.

=== The killings of Desrochers, Lavigne and Rondeau ===
In March 1995, Boucher was found to be carrying a handgun after he was pulled over by the police, doing a few months in prison. After his arrest, a Sûreté du Québec detective told Boucher that the RCMP had a "coded informer" numbered C-2994 within his gang. During his time in prison, Boucher quarrelled with the warden, Nicole Quesnel, after she refused his request to give him day passes and on 9 June 1995, her house was burned down after being firebombed by masked men riding Harley-Davidson motorcycles. It was also during his time in Sorel prison in 1995 that Boucher became well acquainted with a career criminal named Stéphane Gagné whose nickname was Godasse (Old Shoe). In December 1994, Gagné was sentenced to two years in prison for selling cocaine and went to Bordeaux Prison, where he attacked an imprisoned Rock Machine member Jean Duquaire with a homemade knife after Duquaire had asked him to stomp on a photograph of Boucher. After the attack, Gagné was sent to the same prison as Boucher in 1995, where he boasted about his loyalty to the Hells Angels, and told Boucher he would do anything to get into the Angels. Boucher was released in July 1995, and remembered Gagné, telling him to get in touch after he got out of prison, saying he had "important work" for him. Gagné found that Boucher had a disconcerting habit of appearing suddenly and without warning, and expecting him to perform some task instantly; for an example, Boucher showed up unannounced at Gagné's mother's house to tell him that he had an important assignment that needed to be performed immediately. In this case, the assignment was to drive through Verdun to scout a Rock Machine clubhouse that Boucher wanted to see blown up.

After Gagné was released in 1996, he joined the Rockers. Boucher had the Hells Angels run their surveillance unit, consisting of three vehicles, namely a pick-up truck, a van and an automobile with tinted windows and secret cameras with batteries that lasted for 72 hours, which he used to collect intelligence on other criminal groups and the police. The cameras were usually hidden in a Kleenex box on the dashboards. Gagné would park one of the vehicles, set the camera running and come back the next day to collect the video footage. When the mother of the Mafioso Frank Cotroni died, Boucher had Gagné secretly record video footage of everyone who attended the funeral of Cotroni's mother together with the licence plates of their automobiles. Boucher told Gagné that he wanted the names of everyone in the Cotroni family as it was his intention to liquidate the Cotroni family once he was finished with the Rock Machine.

On 9 August 1995, a Jeep wired with a remote-controlled bomb exploded, killing an 11-year-old boy, Daniel Desrochers, who was playing in a nearby schoolyard. According to Kane, Boucher and Steinert had devised a plan to kill one of their own in a brutal manner in order to turn public opinion against the Rock Machine and selected a low-level drug dealer working for the Angels named Marc Dube as the one to be sacrificed. It was Dube who was killed in the bombing that also killed Desrochers. An RCMP report described Steinert as a "very violent and cruel psychopath who can't control himself", concluding he was the man most likely to have exploded the bomb that killed Dube despite the fact that there were children playing across the street from where Dube's jeep was parked. A month later, the first Hells Angels member was shot to death entering his car at a shopping mall. Nine bombs went off around the province during his funeral."

On 23 September 1995, a bouncer, Steven "Bull" Bertrand, who sold drugs for the Hells Angels, called Boucher to complain about being beaten up by another drug dealer. Boucher told him to get a baseball bat and beat bloody the man who punched him out, and as the phone call was being listened in by the police, he was charged with counselling violence. In the aftermath of Desrochers's killing, the province of Quebec was desperate for any reason to put Boucher behind bars and decided to seek to deny him bail in relation to the counselling violence charges in order to put him into jail for at least a few months. On 27 October 1995, Boucher's bail hearing relating to the charges attracted unusual publicity, during which a used car dealer described Boucher as one of his best employees, who had sold $70,000 worth of automobiles in the last year, which was a remarkable achievement for a man who just spent three months in prison. Boucher was able to post bail, but forbidden to associate with members of the Hells Angels, Vito Rizzuto, and Robert Savard, one of the best-known loan sharks in Montreal. On 31 January 1996, Boucher pleaded guilty to counselling violence and paid the $2,000 fine.

During the 1995 referendum, Boucher and the rest of the Hells Angels supported the Non side, with Boucher issuing a statement declaring his support for a united Canada a few days before the referendum, and Hells Angels clubhouses in Quebec all flew the Canadian flag as a sign of their support for federalism. The Hells Angels put up posters all over Montreal, Quebec City and other cities in Quebec urging voters to vote no, and significantly, Quebec separatists who usually vandalized non posters never damaged the posters put up by the Angels. As the non side won the 1995 referendum by the narrowest of margins, it is widely believed that Boucher's decision to have the Angels support the non side may have prevented Quebec from leaving Canada in 1995. It is not clear how much Boucher's support for a united Canada was motivated by a sense of Canadian patriotism, if he possessed any, and how much it was motivated by his desire to have the Hells Angels expand into other provinces, especially Ontario, which would have been handicapped had Quebec left the confederation to become its own country. In December 1995, Kane reported to St. Onge: "He [Boucher] is thinking very seriously about retiring to Mexico within a year, which explains his frequent trips to Mexico. He explains his decision by the fact that the police have become too strong and are everywhere and that he can't move. Several other Nomads are thinking in the same direction". However, Kane reported that Boucher dominated the market for Ecstasy in Montreal, making a $1 profit on every Ecstasy pill sold in the Montreal area.

In the summer of 1997, Boucher decided to bypass the Mafia and establish a direct link to the Colombian drug cartels, sending Lepage to Colombia to meet Miguel Carvajal of the Mejia Twins cartel run by the twin brothers Víctor Manuel Mejía Múnera and Miguel Ángel Mejía Múnera. In December 1997, some 200 kilos of cocaine were shipped to the Gaspé peninsula, a location which represented the beginning of a drug pipeline that continued on to Montreal and eventually to the rest of Canada. The payments for the cocaine went through the Royal Bank of Canada and the Bank of America.

Julie Couillard, an aspiring actress who was in a common-law relationship with loan shark Gilles Giguère, met Boucher through her boyfriend. In her memoir, Couillard described Boucher as a frightening man with "cold eyes". On 26 April 1996, Giguère vanished, never to be seen nor heard from again. Couillard suspected Boucher as the man responsible for Giguère's murder and, once the police concluded that Giguère was indeed dead, felt it highly crass of Boucher to show up at Giguère's funeral. (Note: Couillard would later (2007–2008) gain notoriety as the mistress of Canadian foreign minister Maxime Bernier, and for the public revelation of her having once been associated with the Hells Angels having forced Bernier to resign.)

Because of his spies within the police, Boucher knew that the RCMP had a "mole" within the ranks of the Angels and was consumed with finding out who it was. To flush out the mole and to destabilize the justice system in Quebec, Boucher decided the Angels were to start randomly selecting and murdering individuals associated with the justice system. Boucher was especially alarmed when Rocker hitman Aimé Simard turned délateur (informer) in March 1997, which was the third time since 1985 the Crown had offered a lenient deal to a Hells Angels-associated hitman. Boucher complained that despite their past crimes, Yves "Apache" Trudeau, Serge Quesnel and Simard had nevertheless still all received favorable plea bargains from the Crown. Boucher reasoned that to prevent this, the Hells Angels needed to engage in the kind of crime that would prevent the Crown from striking deals with them—such as random killings of individuals associated with the justice system. Based on his prison experiences,

To that end, Boucher decided to target prison guards, feeling that prison guards were at the bottom of the Quebec justice system totem pole. On 26 June 1997, two "prospects" with the Nomads, Stéphane "Godasse" Gagné and André "Toots" Tousignant, murdered prison guard Dianne Lavigne. According to Gagné, when he met Boucher afterward and told him he had killed a woman, Boucher replied "That's good, Godasse. It doesn't matter that she had tits".

On 8 September 1997, Gagné together with Paul "Fon Fon" Fontaine gunned down the prison guard Pierre Rondeau and wounded another, Robert Corriveau, as they were leaving the Rivière-des-Prairies prison. The Hells Angel Serge Boutin, Fontaine's boyfriend and the chief drug-dealer in Montreal's Gay Village, heard reports from his friends at Bordeaux Prison that the guards had heard rumours that Gagné was involved in the murders and were questioning the inmates about it, which he passed on to Boucher. Boucher became suspicious of Gagné as a result, though he told Gagné: "It's because you're so irritating when you're in prison. That must be why the guards think it's you". At the same time, Boucher had come into conflict with his former right-hand man Steinert. On 4 November 1997, Steinert together with his bodyguard Donald "Bam Bam" Magnussen were last seen alive leaving the Lavigueur mansion where they lived to see Boucher. Their bodies were later found floating in the St. Lawrence with their heads bashed into bloody pulps after being repeatedly hit with baseball bats and hammers.

=== The notorious Québécois folk hero ===
To get information about the murders, Commander André Bouchard ordered a series of raids on strip clubs, bars, and restaurants owned by the Hells Angels. In one raid, Bouchard raided a stripper's agency run by the Angels on 4 December 1997. During the course of the raid, Bouchard knocked out with his fists a Hells Angel who wanted to fight him, asked "Anybody else want some?" after punching out the Angel. Bouchard found within the agency some $2.5 million worth of cocaine together with photographs of the Angels having sex with the strippers and with each other (full patch Angels often sodomize prospective and hang-around Angels as a way of asserting dominance). During the same raid, a Peruvian immigrant and drug dealer named Steve Boies who was found with the cocaine was arrested, and as Boies had assisted Gagné with cleaning up after the killings, he named him as the killer in exchange for a lesser sentence. As a result of Boies's information, Gagné was arrested on 5 December 1997. After a lengthy interrogation by Detective Robert Pigeon, Gagné broke down in tears and agreed to turn Crown's evidence on 6 December 1997.

Gagné was expecting to become wealthy and receive total immunity in exchange for becoming a délateur (informer); instead, Montreal chief Crown attorney André Vincent offered him no money and a 25-year prison sentence with parole possible but conditional on good behavior after that amount of time.

Boucher was extremely unhappy when he learned that Gagné had turned Crown's evidence, believing the Crown would never cut a deal with someone who had killed prison guards. To prevent Gagné's accomplice in the two murders Tousignant from also striking a deal with the Crown, Boucher decided Tousignant had to go. Tousignant went to see Boucher on 7 December 1997 to discuss Gagné becoming a délateur, and disappeared.

On 18 December 1997, Boucher was arrested and charged with two counts of first degree murder for the killings of Rondeau and Lavigne. Boucher was denied bail and was not placed in Rivière-des-Prairies jail. Instead, he was held in a special cell alone at the Tanguay Women's jail. On 27 February 1998, Tousignant's burned corpse was found buried in the Eastern Townships with one bullet hole in his head and another in his chest. Fontaine, by contrast, fled to Quebec City and from there to Mexico. Fontaine was allowed to live as Boucher wanted to keep the services of his boyfriend Boutin. Boucher's preliminary hearing was held on 19 March 1998. Boucher did not attend the preliminary hearing because the prison guards refused to take him to court. Réjean Leguard, the president of the Quebec prison guards union, told the media: "It's like you're a father and someone has raped your daughter and then you're being asked to drive him to court. We have a problem with anyone who participates in the murder of a peace officer."

On 2 November 1998, Boucher's trial began in Montreal with Boucher being defended by Jacques Larochelle and Crown Attorney Jacques Dagenais prosecuting. Dagenais admitted he had a difficult case as Gagné was an unsavory and unlikeable star witness, a self-confessed hitman who had only turned Crown's evidence for a lighter sentence. Furthermore, Gagné stated that he received the orders to kill the prison guards from Fontaine and Tousignant while by his own admission Boucher had only made cryptic statements and hand gestures to him. Larochelle was an able lawyer from Quebec City with an aloof manner well known for his ability to relentlessly tear apart the credibility of the Crown's witnesses by a series of sharp, probing questions. Larochelle was internationally famous and defended Théoneste Bagosora, one of the architects of the 1994 genocide in Rwanda. The judge overseeing Boucher's trial, Justice Jean-Guy Boilard, had overseen the trial of Réjean Lessard and the men responsible for the Lennoxville massacre in 1986, and is known as the "most widely feared judge in Quebec's criminal courts", given to bullying lawyers and witnesses. During the trial, Justice Boilard displayed a strong bias in favour of the defence and promptly agreed to Larochelle's request to exclude five tapes of intercepted phone calls made by Boucher, which weakened the Crown's case. Boilard ruled that warrant to tap Boucher's cell phone had been made illegally as the police in their warrant application stated they were seeking information about who burned down the house of Nicole Quesnel in 1995. Larochelle attacked Gagné as a career criminal whose word could not be trusted and during his cross-examination got Gagné to confess that he had "no respect for the truth" and would tell any lie that advanced his interests. Boucher did not see fit to testify in his own defence. In his instructions to the jury, Justice Boilard all but accused Gagné of perjury and urged the jury to acquit Boucher. On 27 November 1998, Boucher was acquitted of ordering the murder of Rondeau and Lavigne in 1997, and afterwards become a folk-hero in Quebec. Boucher was carried out of the courtroom on the shoulders of his fellow Hells Angels while Commander Bouchard, who was present in the courtroom, looked very glum at the sight.

On the night of 27 November 1998, to celebrate his acquittal, Boucher attended a boxing match with his fellow Nomads, with the audience cheering him as he took his seat and hundreds of people lining up to get his autograph. When Boucher arrived at the Molson Centre to see the middleweight boxing match between David Hilton and Stéphane Ouellet, the crowd roared its approval of him as he was considered to be "cool". Commander André Bouchard who headed the investigation that assembled the evidence that Boucher had ordered the murders of Lavigne and Rondeau, had been feeling heartbroken when he learned that Boucher had been acquitted of the two murders, and felt that attending the Hilton-Ouellet boxing match might get his mind off the pain of defeat. Bouchard arrived early at the Molson Centre and remembered: "We heard an uproar and as I turned to my left it was like Moses had parted the water, and who did we see coming through the crowd [but] Mom Boucher in full colours, escorted by his henchmen. What broke my heart was seeing hundreds of people actually give him a standing ovation as if he [were] a rock star".

The 1998 Hilton-Ouellet boxing match marked the beginning of Boucher's "folk hero" status in Quebec. Whenever Boucher and his fellow Angels rode their Harley-Davidson motorcycles down the streets of the working class Hochelaga-Maisonneuve district in Montreal, ordinary people would come out to cheer Boucher like it was a royal procession. Boucher became a celebrity in Quebec, despite or perhaps because of the violence of the biker war, with many polls showing that he was one of the most admired and best-loved men in la belle province while the Quebec media often engaged in fawning coverage of the charismatic Boucher. Those associated with the justice system described Boucher's "folk hero" status as reflecting the moral decay of Quebecois society. The Crown attorney, Madame France Charbonneau, widely considered to be the toughest prosecutor in Quebec, launched an appeal to try to undo double jeopardy in regards to Boucher's 1998 trial, arguing the trial was marred by so many irregularities such as Justice Boilard's pro-defence bias that a new trial was required.

In September 1999, the Hells Angel David Carroll told Kane that Boucher was a "strong leader", but a poor businessman. Carroll described Hamel as the true intelligence behind the Nomad chapter as he stated the quiet and little known Hamel was the man who made the members of the Nomad chapter rich via his business skills. Carroll described to Kane la table faction that consisted of Boucher, Hamel, Houle, Michel Rose, Gilles Mathieu and André Chouinard as being the elite within the elite as Carroll stated that the members of la table made the most money by far.

=== Feud with Commander Bouchard ===
One of Boucher's most persistent adversaries was Commander André Bouchard of the Service de police de la Ville de Montréal, who headed the Major Crimes Unit in the 1990s and 2000s. Bouchard, who joined the Montreal police in June 1970 at the age of 20, was a tough, foul-mouthed "old school" policeman, who preferred to beat up criminals in order to save the Crown the expenses of trials and imprisonment, and who would only charge criminals if they committed a major crime. As a young policeman in the 1970s, Bouchard had often brawled with the Popeyes, the biker gang who became the first Hells Angels chapter in Canada in 1977. Bouchard told the journalists Julian Sher and William Marsden in an interview that he greatly regretted the adoption of the Charter of Rights and Freedoms in 1982, saying about "old school" policing that: "Don't forget this before the Charter of Rights. You saw a guy walking up the street in his colors, you kicked the shit out of him, and that was it". Bouchard argued that the "old school" methods of beating up outlaw bikers were far preferable to modern policing methods as outlaw bikers only respect violence. Bouchard admitted to Sher and Marsden that: "I always hated these guys [outlaw bikers]. I would see them on the streets and they'd piss me off. I just didn't like them". Bouchard came from the same Hochelaga-Maisonneuve district that Boucher also grew up in, and like him, he spoke his joual (Quebec French) with a strong working-class accent; however unlike Boucher with his violent alcoholic father, Bouchard's father had served in the Royal Canadian Air Force in World War II, afterwards becoming a policeman, and was credited by his son with teaching him the difference between right and wrong. Bouchard first encountered Boucher in the 1970s and starting in the early 1980s, he often investigated crimes committed by him.

As a man who detested outlaw bikers, Bouchard become Boucher's arch enemy, and to annoy him, Boucher took to hanging around with his fellow Angels wearing their "Death's Head" patches on their jackets together with their lawyers at the Au Bon Pain cafe, which was also Bouchard's favourite cafe. In this, Boucher was more than successful, as Bouchard regarded the Au Bon Pain as "his" territory, and greatly resented the Hells Angels holding their meetings at the Au Bon Pain, knowing that Boucher was surrounding himself with his lawyers to ensure that police could not electronically eavesdrop on their conversations. Bouchard was especially infuriated by the fact that Boucher was in effect planning crimes literally right in front of him. Bouchard told Sher and Marsden in a 1999 interview: "'Cause I'll tell you something. He wouldn't have done that twenty years ago. Twenty years ago we would have kicked the shit out of him right there in front of everybody. We [would] have grabbed him; we would have ripped his fucking jacket off him [and] put him on the floor. We would [have] thumped the son of a bitch. Because you do not intimidate a cop. You've got to show them, 'I'm not afraid of you, you prick.'" Bouchard very much wanted to beat up Boucher and the rest of his Angels who were hanging around at the Au Bon Pain, but was told by his superiors that the "old school" policing methods he had started with were no longer acceptable, so he just had to accept the Hells Angels were holding their meetings at the Au Bon Pain about four days every week. Frequently, Bouchard and his fellow policemen at one table in the Au Bon Pain would stare for hours at Boucher and his Angels at another table, to see who would blink first in the stare-downs that occurred with much regularity from 1999 onward.

=== Purging his allies ===
On 26 April 2000, Boucher had lunch at a popular Montreal restaurant, Shawn's, with André "Dédé" Desjardins, one of the most "infamous" union bosses in Quebec who had become Montreal's most successful loan shark. Shawn's was well known in Montreal for its buxom waitresses who served customers dressed in string bikinis. The meeting was not friendly as Boucher asked Desjardins to forgive a $400,000 loan with 52% interest that a friend of his had taken out with Desjardins and was struggling to repay, a request that Desjardins refused out of hand. However, Desjardins agreed to meet Boucher at Shawn's the next day to further discuss the matter. On 27 April 2000, Desjardins was murdered in a very professional killing while leaving Shawn's, with an assassin putting 11 bullets into his back as he was getting into his car. Instead of meeting Desjardins at Shawn's as he had promised, Boucher went for a coffee at his favourite coffee shop, the Au Bon Pain. While Boucher was enjoying his coffee, Commander Bouchard arrived at the Au Bon Pain to ask Boucher what he knew about the murder of Desjardins and why he did not have breakfast at Shawn's as he had promised. Boucher refused to answer any questions and told Bouchard he would only speak with his lawyer present. On the afternoon of 27 April, Boucher together with his lawyer, Gilbert Frigon, met Bouchard at a police station to talk about the murder of Desjardins. Boucher claimed he and Desjardins had been talking about the weather in the Dominican Republic the previous day, which had bored him so much that he decided to skip breakfast with Desjardins that day. Boucher told Bouchard that it was a "sad thing" that his friend Desjardins had been murdered and would call him at once "if he heard anything". Bouchard later recalled that Boucher did not seem at all upset about the murder of his "friend" Desjardins.

Gagné testified at Boucher's trial in 2002 that Boucher greatly resented the power of the Mafia and was planning to drive them out of Montreal altogether, but was waiting until he won the Quebec biker war with the Rock Machine before taking on the Mafia, who were a far more powerful organization. However, Gagné testified that Boucher wanted to eliminate people like Desjardins, French-Canadian criminals willing to work with the Mafia, as an interim measure as a way of weakening the power of the Mafia before taking them on outright. Boucher's friend who was struggling with the loan was a man who had associations with the Rizzuto family and was not a Hells Angel. Langton argued that Boucher had chosen to use a case of an Italo-Canadian struggling with an unpayable loan as an excuse to eliminate Desjardins without arousing the suspicions of his nominal ally, Vito Rizzuto. Sher and Marsden wrote that Desjardins's murder was not "an isolated killing over a simple debt", but rather "the beginning of a new era of consolidation of the Hells' now massive drug empire, which extended throughout Quebec and the Maritimes and was fast spreading into Ontario and western Canada". Desjardins's business partner Robert Savard was killed on 7 July 2000 after having breakfast with Boucher on the previous day and by October 2000, there had been 11 murders of "independent" gangsters not with the Rizzuto family who had previously been allies of the Hells Angels.

In June 2000, Sandra Craig, a Bolivian immigrant who was the daughter of one of Bolivia's most powerful drug lords was almost killed by the Hells Angels on the streets of Montreal and on 29 August 2000, her Canadian husband Raymond Craig was killed by the Angels in the resort town of Ste-Adèle; the Craigs had previously been the main link between the Colombian gangsters and the Rizzuto family and the Hells Angels in Montreal. On 21 June 2000, the Nomads Normand Robitaille, André Chouinard and Michel Rose met Rizzuto to agree on the price of a kilo of cocaine in Quebec: $50,000, and with a penalty of death for anyone who sold below that amount. Kane stated that Boucher wanted to attend the meeting with Rizzuto but did not, so as not to attract police attention. According to Kane, a group called La Table consisting of Boucher, Denis Houle, Michel Rose, Normand Robitaille and André Chouinard set the prices for drugs in Quebec in consultation with the Mafia. Due to the agreement with Rizzuto, Boucher no longer needed the Craigs, and decided to dispense with their services. On 23 June 2000, to celebrate the 5th anniversary of the founding of the Nomads, Boucher held a party, which was the last time that Louis "Mélou" Roy, a Nomad and the Hells Angels chapter president for Trois-Rivières was seen alive. Roy had objected to the deal Boucher had reached with the Rizzuto family to sell cocaine for $50,000 per kilo. Roy had preferred to sell cocaine for considerably less and had told Boucher he would not abide by La Table's prices, believing that as a founding member of the Nomads that he was immune from being punished by Boucher. At the preliminary hearing for the West End Gang boss Gerry Matticks in 2001, a witness for the Crown testified that Roy was taken from Boucher's party to a meat-processing plant owned by Matticks, had his mouth stuffed so he could not scream, and was put through a meat-grinder while still alive. Regardless of his actual fate, Roy was last seen alive going to the Nomads' party on 25 June 2000 and has not been seen since. In the summer of 2000, Michel Auger, the crime correspondent of Le Journal de Montréal wrote a series of articles stating that Boucher had turned on his former allies such as Desjardins, Savard and the Craigs and was systematically killing them off. Carroll told Kane in July 2000 that Boucher "controls all of Montreal—it's his city".

Reflecting his mainstream status, during the wedding of Hells Angel member René Charlebois on 5 August 2000, Ginette Reno, one of the best-loved folksingers in Quebec, attended, sang, and posed for photographs with Boucher for the Montreal tabloid Allô Police, saying to the Allô Police journalist that she was honoured to meet such an outstanding man like Boucher. Also attending and performing at the wedding was another well-loved French-Canadian folk singer Jean-Pierre Ferland who also posed for photographs with Boucher, saying it was a great honour to meet him. Both Ferland and Reno later claimed that they were unaware that the Hells Angels were one of the most feared criminal syndicates in Quebec at the time they attended the wedding. However, critics noted that both Reno and Ferland were paid $1 million for performing at Charlebois's wedding, suggesting that was the real reason for their willingness to associate with the Hell's Angels, instead of their professed ignorance. Reno stated in her defence: "Jesus hung around with bad people. Are they killers and criminals 24 hours a day? You can't be rotten from morning till night".

=== The Auger assassination attempt and the truce ===
On 13 September 2000, Auger was shot five times in the back while opening the trunk of his car in the parking lot of Le Journal de Montréal, and was almost killed. In the summer of 2000, Auger had written several articles linking Boucher to the murder of Desjardins, and the attempt on Auger's life was remarkably similar to the murder of Desjardins. The attempted murder of Auger sparked protests by journalists in Montreal demanding the federal government pass an anti-gang law similar to the RICO act in the United States. Vito Rizzuto, the boss of the Rizzuto crime family, was terrified of a RICO type act being passed in Canada and in a striking demonstration of the power of the Mafia in Montreal ordered a truce in the Quebec biker war. On 27 September 2000, Boucher met with Frédéric "Fred" Faucher, the leader of the Rock Machine, in a courthouse in Quebec City to agree to the truce. However, the truce did not stop the violence by the Hells Angels. In October 2000, a bar owner in the town of Terrebonne named Francis Laforest refused to permit the Rowdy Ones, a puppet club of the Hells Angels, to sell drugs in his bar. As Laforest was walking his dog, he was attacked in broad daylight by three masked men who beat him to death with baseball bats. Led by Auger, a protest took place in Montreal to honour Laforest with Auger saying of Quebec's murderous outlaw bikers: "They believed that they are on [...] top of the world. The criminals had built up a system so sophisticated that they are above the law [...] We are the only country in the world where [...] gangs [get] a free ride".

On 8 October 2000 to celebrate Thanksgiving, Boucher and Faucher had dinner together at Bleu Martin restaurant and while a photographer from Allô Police tabloid recorded the scene, the leaders of the Hell's Angels and the Rock Machine exchanged handshakes, hugged and broke bread together (a common symbol in French-Canada of reconciliation). To seal the truce the biker leaders then went to Super-Sexe, at the time a well known strip club in Montreal, with photographers from Allô Police in tow. The truce was more of a public relations gimmick. The Canadian journalists Julian Sher and William Marsden wrote that by the fall of 2000 "the Hells Angels had achieved their goal of controlling the drug trade in Quebec."

On 10 October 2000, a Montreal appeals judge overruled double jeopardy, declaring that the Crown had presented credible evidence that the 1998 trial of Boucher was marred by intimidation of the jury and that Justice Boilard's instructions to the jury were defective, and as such, Boucher should be retried for the murders of Lavigne and Rondeau. The court of appeal accepted the argument of Crown Attorney France Charbonneau that Justice Boilard had displayed such an outrageous pro-defence bias that a new trial was required.

After the appeals judge undid double jeopardy, Commander Bouchard had Boucher arrested leaving a restaurant to be charged once again for two counts of first degree murder for the killings of Rondeau and Lavigne. Bouchard stated that Boucher "was pissed off," recalling that Boucher swore continuously at the police when he was taken in, as he never expected double jeopardy to be undone. Boucher was denied bail and held at the Tanguay jail prior to and during his trial. He refused to eat the prison's food out of fear of being poisoned, instead subsisting on a steady diet of chocolate bars. Boucher's lawyer, Robert Lemieux, who was renown in Quebec for his role defending members of the FLQ during and after the October Crisis of 1970, announced that his client had launched a $30 million lawsuit against the province of Quebec, alleging wrongful prosecution. Unfortunately for Boucher he wrote the letter of complaint himself, sparking widespread ridicule as his writing was full of spelling and grammatical mistakes. The discovery that high school dropout Boucher was incapable of writing a proper French sentence damaged his public mystique some, lending him a somewhat oafish image. Boucher hired lawyer Alan Gold to challenge the appeal court's decision before the Supreme Court, arguing that the decision to overturn double jeopardy violated his rights under the Charter of Rights and Freedoms, but to no avail as in December 2000 the Supreme Court sided with the Crown.

More seriously for Boucher, on 24 January 2001, Sandra Craig, who had been hunted by the Angels for several months turned herself in to the police, and turned Crown's evidence. Craig, who was an active drug dealer in partnership with her late husband, possessed much information in the form of spreadsheets and invoices about the sale of drugs in Montreal, testifying she and her husband had arranged the sale of 1,700 kilos of cocaine to the Hells Angels between 1998 and 2000. Commander Bouchard, Boucher's nemesis, in the meantime had used Kane's reports about the murders committed by the Angels and the Rockers as the basis for a list of suspects and then had two detectives, Louis-Marc Pelletier and Michel Tremblay, thoroughly reexamine all of the forensic evidence from all of the murders that Kane had listed. After much work, Tremblay and Pelletier discovered four pieces of previously undetected DNA evidence such as skin flakes and saliva from Kleenexes found at the crime scenes. Using Kane's list of killers, Bouchard had the Service de police de la Ville de Montréal seize DNA evidence left in the "open" by the Hells Angels or the Rockers such as uneaten food at restaurants or discarded cardboard coffee cups as the basis for DNA testing. In this way, the Service de police de la Ville de Montréal linked four Angels/Rockers, most notably Boucher's bodyguard, Gregory Woolley, to the murders. On 28 March 2001, Boucher learned from his jail cell of Operation Springtime, which saw the arrest of 142 bikers including 80 of the 106 "full patch" Hells Angels and almost the entire Nomad chapter plus every member of the Rockers and the Evil Ones.

== Conviction ==
During the intense war between the Hells Angels and the Rock Machine, Boucher ordered the murders of Quebec correctional officers Diane Lavigne and Pierre Rondeau in 1997. Both officers had been chosen at random. Besides the blow to the judicial system in Quebec, Boucher wanted crimes committed by bikers that would be so serious that prosecutors would not want to make deals to turn bikers into informants.

In 1998, a jury acquitted Boucher of having ordered those murders. He was then closely followed by the police. In 2000, an appeals court dismissed the earlier acquittal, and he was arrested again. He was convicted of the murders with the help of a police informer in May 2002. The Crown Attorney prosecuting Boucher, France Charbonneau described herself as: "I am a woman of conviction. I don't play". During the trial which began on 26 March 2002, Charbonneau regularly received death threats. The key witness for the prosecution was Stéphane Gagné, nicknamed Godasse (Old Shoe), who was involved in both murders. He testified that Boucher ordered him to carry out the killings and was later congratulated by Boucher himself. Besides for Gagné, Serge Boutin also turned Crown's evidence. In February 2000, Boutin killed another drug dealer and police informer Claude Des Serres in a skiing chalet in the Laurentians mountains. As Des Serres was wearing a wire at the time Boutin tortured and killed him, the police listened in to the last minutes of his life. Facing a life sentence, Boutin cut a deal with the Crown where he plea-bargained to pleading guilty to manslaughter and serving seven years in prison in exchange for testifying against Boucher. One of the witnesses at the first trial, Nancy Dubé, who testified that she saw Gagné set his get-away car afire after killing Rondeau, refused to testify at the second trial. Boucher had visited her furniture store in downtown Montreal where she worked as a clerk and gave him menacing looks as he pretended to browse. Charbonneau stated: "She almost died of fright".

The most damning evidence came from beyond the grave as the reports that Kane had submitted to the RCMP were presented as Crown's evidence. Shortly before committing suicide in August 2000, Kane had stolen the financial records of the Nomads, which showed that over the course of the first 8 months of 2000, the Hells Angels had made a profit of $111,503,110 in Quebec, and which were presented as evidence for the Crown. During the trial, Charbonneau had such a ferocious courtroom demeanor that Boucher's lawyer, Jacques Larochelle, was visibly upset at dealing with her. When Larochelle started to refer to Boucher as "Mom" in the courtroom in order to make him seem lovable to the jury, Charbonneau objected every time, saying he should be referred to as Monsieur Boucher; she was so effective in her objections that finally even Larochelle took to describing his client as M. Boucher. During his cross-examination of Gagné, Larochelle noted that there were inconsistencies in his first confession to Sergeant Pigeon, leading for Gagné to reply that he had not slept for almost 24 hours and was tired. Larochelle sneeringly told Gagné: "I've seen the video and you don't look tired". Charbonneau rose up to announce: "Let's see the video". The video was played where a clearly exhausted Gagné almost falling asleep several times during his confession, which Charbonneau used to almost put Larochelle on trial, accusing him of being a pathologically dishonest lawyer who would say anything to win the case.

After 11 days of deliberation by the jury, Boucher was found guilty of one count of attempted murder and two counts of first-degree murder on 5 May 2002. Boucher displayed no emotion as the verdict was announced besides for "a slight pursing of his lips". Boucher received an automatic life sentence, with no possibility of parole for at least 25 years. On 5 May 2002, Commander Bouchard was playing golf when he received a phone call from Charbonneau reporting that Boucher had been convicted, recalled: "She was crying on the phone. They had a party at her house. We were all invited to go down and have champagne". Bouchard himself stated he felt very peaceful and content on hearing the news of Boucher's conviction. After his conviction, Boucher was replaced with Jacques "Isreal" Emond as the new Quebec Hells Angels leader.

== Life behind bars ==
Boucher was detained in the only Canadian Super-Maximum security penitentiary, located in Sainte-Anne-des-Plaines, north of Montreal. In May 2002, Boucher was held in the prison's E-block section where other Hells Angels were housed. In the spring of 2002, Boucher played volleyball with his fellow Angels in the prison yard, and for reasons that remain unexplained on 25 June 2002 signed up for career counselling despite his life sentence. In the summer of 2002, Boucher was transferred to the Special Handling Unit where his neighbours included the serial killers Clifford Olson and Allan Légère. While Boucher was described as being jovial when housed in E-block, he appeared rather depressed in the Special Handling Unit, and prison cameras repeatedly document his looking around carefully when venturing out of his cell. On 13 August 2002, an Indian Posse inmate attacked Boucher with an improvised knife. Boucher was described as being "depressed, cantankerous and aggressive" in prison.

In September 2002, the Indian Posse, a criminal gang made up of First Nations people active on the Prairies, tried to kill Boucher by firing a bazooka at his cell. The Hells Angels only accept white men, and have been involved in bloody disputes with First Nations criminal groups in the Prairies, which led the Indian Posse to try to kill the most infamous Canadian Hells Angel. In the summer of 2002, at the Stoney Mountain Penitentiary in Manitoba, a member of the Zig-Zag crew, a Hells Angel puppet gang, had injured an Indian Posse member by throwing him down a flight of stairs, leading to a member of the Indian Posse stabbing a Zig-Zag Crew member in revenge. Danny Wolfe, the leader of the Indian Posse ordered Boucher killed as a way of demonstrating the power of the Indian Posse.

Commander Bouchard later told the media in 2011 it was rumoured that the American leadership of the Hell's Angels wanted Boucher dead, saying: "We've heard that [Hell's Angels leadership] in the United States got together and [decided] to take the fucker out. They say this is the guy who caused all the trouble." Whether or not a jailhouse contract on Boucher existed at the time, on 23 October 2010 Boucher was wounded during an attempt on his life when another prisoner stabbed him. The man who attacked Boucher was a First Nations criminal who had wanted to join the Hells Angels, but was refused as the Angels only accept whites. Boucher's attacker repeatedly referred to the Angels' whites only acceptance policy when stabbing him with a dining knife before other prisoners stepped in and put a stop to it.

In April 2014 it was reported that the Angels had expelled Boucher outright from the organization.

On 3 November 2015, Boucher and another inmate, René Girard, were accused of attempting to murder another prisoner, Ghislain Gaudet, stabbing him repeatedly with improvised knives. Girard, a man of limited intelligence who during an alcohol and cocaine binge in 1986 had sex with a man whom he mistook for a woman, and killed him in his fury when he noticed his lover had a penis, was described as an immature man prone to extreme violence who is easily manipulated. Boucher and Girard were charged with the attempted murder of Gaudet.

Boucher's former bodyguard, a Haitian immigrant named Gregory Woolley, has been described as a major player in organized crime in Montreal. On 19 November 2015, Boucher and his daughter, Alexandra Mongeau, were charged with conspiracy to commit murder. In the indictment, the Crown alleged that Boucher continued to engage in organized crime from his prison cell, passing messages to his daughter who in her turn relayed the messages to Woolley, and claimed that Boucher had via Mongeau ordered Woolley to kill Raynald Desjardins, a close associate of the Mafiosi Vito Rizzuto, who had been the leader of the Rizzuto crime family. The Sûreté du Québec Chief Inspector Patrick Bélanger said Boucher wanted Desjardins killed so as to "ensure they could continue to control the territory," but added there was also "certainly an aspect of vengeance." In May 2016, lawyers for Woolley and Boucher were able to stymie the preliminary inquiry phrase of the trial, saying both men wanted to attend the preliminary inquiry sessions, but demanded a change in venue, saying the Gouin courthouse was unsafe for their clients.

Shortly before his trial was due to begin, Boucher pleaded guilty on 17 April 2018 for conspiring to murder Raynald Desjardins. According to the summary of facts agreed to before Justice Éric Downs, Boucher on 21 July 2015 told his daughter during a visit to him in prison: ""Euh. In the affairs of the Mafia … OK? If he comes here I know someone who can kill him, if he wants. Because, to me, (Desjardins) will be brought here (at Ste-Anne-des-Plaines). If he comes here, we can kill him." Boucher's reasons for wanting to kill Desjardins were revenge for the murder of the Mafiosi Salvatore Montagna on 24 November 2011, which Desjardins had ordered after falling out with his ally Montagna. In September 2015, Mongeau contacted an undercover Sûreté du Québec officer posing as a hitman with the aim of hiring him to kill Desjardins. On 11 May 2018, Downs sentenced Boucher to ten years in prison, meaning that the earliest that Boucher could apply for parole would be in 2037.

During the sentencing hearing, it was revealed that Boucher's daughter Mongeau received a share of the profits made by drug dealers in the Hochelaga-Maisonneuve neighbourhood between 2011–2015 as she worked as messenger for her father and the Montreal underworld. Between November 2014 and February 2015, the police had Mongeau under surveillance, and noted that various drug dealers would drop off bags of cash at her home every Friday as she collected between $100,000–$160,000. At the time of her arrest in February 2015, the police found two bags of cash totalling $60,000 in her possession. The willingness of drug dealers to pay Mongeau ashare of their profits shows that Boucher still had influence in the Montreal underworld despite being in prison since 2002. Matthew Ferguson, the Crown Attorney prosecuting Boucher and Mongeau declined to explain to the media why the Crown had not presented evidence of Mongeau's involvement in the plot to kill Desjardins, leading to her acquittal with Mongeau only being sentenced to 21 months of community service for living off the proceeds of crime.

According to Thibault and Séguin, Boucher strongly desired revenge against his former outlaws, should he ever be released, whom he regards as having betrayed him. Other revelations included a cancer diagnosis and long periods of time spent in solitary confinement.

On 10 July 2022, La Presse reported that Boucher died while receiving palliative care for throat cancer. He was 69 years old. He received the last rites from a Catholic chaplain shortly before his death. His ashes were scattered in a wooded area on Saint Helen's Island in the presence of a small, private group of family members, under the remote surveillance of the Sûreté du Québec (Quebec provincial police force) and the curiosity of the media who took a few pictures from the distance. In accordance with his last wishes, no members of the Hells Angels were present at the ceremony.
