= Gilles Mathieu =

Canadian outlaw biker (born 1950)

Gillles Mathieu
- Born: 23 August 1950 (age 76); Montreal, Quebec, Canada
- Other name: "Trooper"
- Occupations: Outlaw biker, gangster
- Allegiance: Hells Angels MC (1980–2009)
- Convictions: Conspiracy to traffic in narcotics (1981); Conspiracy to commit murder (2003); Conspiracy to traffic in narcotics (2003); Gangsterism (2003)
- Penalty: 20 years in prison

Gilles Mathieu (born 23 August 1950), better known as "Trooper", is a Canadian outlaw biker and gangster who served as the secretary to the elite Nomad chapter of the Hells Angels Motorcycle Club in Quebec from 1995 to his arrest in 2001.

== Hells Angel ==
Mathieu was born into a working class family. He worked as a maritime inspector at the port of Montreal. In 1980, Mathieu was arrested for attempting to sell LSD to an undercover policeman. On 5 December 1980, he joined the Hells Angels. On 26 June 1981, Mathieu was convicted of conspiracy to sell LSD and sentenced to a year in prison. Mathieu was present at the clubhouse of the Angels' Sherbrooke chapter on the night of the Lennoxville massacre in 1985, but was acquitted. Mathieu was known for his "violent streak" as Paul Cherry, the crime correspondent of The Montreal Gazette described it .

On 25 June 1995, Mathieu was a founding member of the elite Nomad chapter of the Hells Angels. During the Quebec Biker War, Mathieu seemed to be always by the side of Maurice Boucher. When the hitman Stéphane Gagné – whose nickname was Godasse (Old Shoe) – reported to Boucher that he had killed the prison guard Diane Lavigne on 26 June 1997, Mathieu was present. When Boucher asked for Mathieu's opinion of the murder, he replied: "That's great, Godasse!"

Mathieu was considered to be one of the most important Hells Angels in Montreal and a millionaire. At his preliminary hearing (the Canadian equivalent to a grand jury) in 2001 relating to Operation Springtime charges, evidence presented by the Crown showed he owned a company with assets worth $2.3 million whose headquarters was an address at the West Edmonton Mall. Mathieu was also believed to have placed at least $1 million in a tax haven in the Cayman Islands.

On 15 February 2001, Mathieu was arrested at a Montreal hotel where he together with several Hells Angels were looking at photographs of the members of the Bandidos gang. Found in the room were several handguns and about $10,000 in cash. In a plea bargain with the Crown Attorney, André Vincent, Mathieu pleaded guilty to weapons charges and was sentenced to a year in prison.

== Operation Springtime ==
On 28 March 2001, the police launched Operation Springtime, a crackdown against the Hells Angels. Mathieu, who was already in jail owing to the weapons charges, was also charged with 13 counts of first-degree murder as part of Operation Springtime.

At his trial in 2003, Vincent presented evidence that linked Mathieu to the 13 murders of Rock Machine members. The trial came to an unexpected end on 11 September 2003 when Mathieu together with the other accused all made plea bargains with Vincent. In exchange for the Crown dropping the 13 counts of first-degree murder charges, Mathieu pleaded guilty to conspiracy to commit murder, conspiracy to traffic in narcotics, and gangsterism. The judge sentenced Mathieu to 20 years in prison.

Mathieu was released on parole on 20 September 2013. The National Parole Board did not accept Mathieu's claim that he had resigned from the Hells Angels in 2009 and imposed the parole condition that he live in a half-way house. On 17 December 2014, Mathieu asked for permission to leave the half-way house, which was refused by the parole board as it established that he had over the course of 2014 visited four times a barber with known Hells Angels associations, which the parole board took as evidence that he was still loyal to the Hells Angels.

== Books ==
- Cherry, Paul (2005). The Biker Trials: Bringing Down the Hells Angels. Toronto: ECW Press. ISBN 978-1550226386.
- Langton, Jerry (2010). Showdown: How the Outlaws, Hells Angels and Cops Fought for Control of the Streets. Toronto: John Wiley. ISBN 978-0470678787..
- Schneider, Stephen (2009). Iced: The Story of Organized Crime in Canada. Toronto: John Wiley & Sons. ISBN 978-0470835005..
- Sher, Julian; Marsden, William (2003). The Road To Hell How the Biker Gangs Are Conquering Canada. Toronto: Alfred Knopf. ISBN 0-676-97598-4.
