= France Charbonneau =

Canadian judge

The Honourable France Charbonneau

Judge of the Quebec Superior Court
- In office 2004–present

Chair of the Charbonneau Commission
- In office 9 November 2011–24 November 2015

Personal details
- Education: Université de Montréal, Faculté de droit (LL.L) (1977)

France Charbonneau is a Canadian judge sitting on the Quebec Superior Court. She was appointed on 4 October 2004.

== Crown Attorney ==
Charbonneau began her legal career in the 1970s as a legal secretary and complained that many of the grand seigneur lawyers whom she worked treated her a patronizing sexist manner, which inspired her to go into law school to study the law herself. Charbonneau served as a Crown attorney in Quebec for 26 years, beginning in 1979, and worked at as a legal aid lawyer. As a Crown Attorney, Charbonneau tried over 80 murder cases, including that of Maurice Boucher, and served as a prosecutor on Operation Carcajou. Of her 80 murder cases, she won convictions in 79.

In 1998, Charbonneau served as an assistant Crown Attorney aiding the main Crown Attorney, Jacques Dagnais, at the first murder trial of Boucher. Boucher's attorney, Jacques Larochelle, was a well respected Quebec City defense lawyer noted for suave, courtly manner; speaking his French with a strong upper class accent; and his ability to tear apart the credibility of the Crown's witnesses on the stand via a series of sharp, probing questions. Larochelle during his cross-examination of the Crown's star witness, Stéphane Gagné, was able to force Gagné to admit under oath that he had "no respect for the truth", a damming statement that he used to argue that Gagné had committed perjury. The trial ended in Boucher's acquittal. Charbonneau stated she was not impressed with Larochelle, saying that he struck her as the type of arrogant, upper class male attorney who had no respect for the abilities of female lawyers and that she found his upper-class accent and mannerisms patronizing and offensive.

In a rare legal move, Charbonneau challenged double jeopardy and on 10 October 2000, the Quebec Court of Appeals ordered a new trial for Boucher on the grounds that the judge at the 1998 trial, Justice Jean-Guy Boilard, had been biased towards the defense in his conduct of the trial and in his jury instructions. Charbonneau stated: "The courtroom is my living room. It's my home". Charbonneau described herself as a woman very passionate about the law who greatly enjoyed the sparring and arguing promoted by the adversarial English common law system used for criminal cases in Canada, where the courtrooms are the scenes of all-out struggles between the Crown attorneys vs. the defense counsel.

Charbonneau prosecuted Boucher at his second trial in 2002. Boucher's first trial had ended with Larochelle portraying the Crown's main witness, the hitman Stéphane Gagné as unreliable and prone to perjury. Charbonneau ordered the police to review the evidence, and in turn the police found surveillance tapes that confirmed aspects of Gagné's testimony such as his statement that he was serving as Boucher's bodyguard on 5 December 1997 at a party to celebrate the 20th anniversary of the Hells Angels arrival in Canada. The police team had failed to fully examine the photographs, videotapes, wiretaps and phone records before the first trial and instead relied upon civilian analysts to log the evidence. The analysts not being professional policeman and policewomen had missed the significant evidence. Charbonneau also managed to have two police wiretaps of Boucher's cell phone calls that Justice Boilard had excluded as evidence at the 1998 trial introduced at the 2002 trial, which confirmed other aspects of Gagné's testimony. Gagné stated that a used car dealer, Daniel Foster, had supplied the get-away vehicles used in the murders, and the two cell phones calls made by Boucher to Foster on 4 and 27 June 1997 showed that Boucher had just purchased two used cars that were of the same make and model as the get-away cars used in the murder of Diane Lavigne. Other police tapes confirmed the Hells Angels hierarchy precisely in the manner that Gagné had described, which Charbonneau as evidence at the trial he was telling the truth.

Charbonneau was also helped by the fact that Serge Boutin, a leading Hells Angel had cut a deal with the Crown after he killed a police informer Claude Des Serres in February 2000. Boutin's testimony supported and confirmed Gagné's testimony. Boutin had been the boyfriend of the Hells Angel Paul "Fonfon" Fontaine who taken part in the second murder of the prison guard Pierre Rondeau alongside Gagné. Nancy Dubê, the teenager furniture store clerk, who testified at the first trial that she had seen Gagné flee from the burning get-away van after the murder of Pierre Rondeau, refused to testify at the second trial. Boucher had entered the store where she worked and starred at her intensely, which left Dubê so utterly terrified that she refused to testify as she stated that Boucher was a killer and a rapist who knew where she lived and worked. Charbonneau who spoken with Dubê in an unsuccessful attempt to persuade to testify stated: "She almost died of fright".

The trial began on 26 March 2002. Charbonneau received constant death threats from the Hells Angels during the trial and was under 24-hour police guard. The trial was a bitter clash of wills as the journalists Julian Sher and William Marsden wrote: "The trial did not go smoothly. It was four weeks of acid and vinegar. Charbonneau fought for every inch of what she gained. Larochelle tried to rally, but it was clear he was uncomfortable with the Crown's aggression...Not a sarcastic gesture or comment went unpunished. If he signed or shrugged, ooohed or aahed as he cross-examined Gagné, she repeatedly objected to his sarcasm". Charbonneau stated that Boucher was a killer and she was determined to see him convicted, regarding the trial as a sort of "war" against Larochelle and Boucher. The fact that Boucher had been convicted of rape in 1984 made him an especially appalling figure in Charbonneau's eyes.

Charbonneau had the Hells Angels excluded the courtroom to prevent intimidation of the jury as she noticed at the first trial that jury seemed nervous at the presence of Hells Angels in the courtroom wearing their death's head patches on their biker vests. Charbonnneau did not permit joking in the courtroom and objected every time that Larcholle called Boucher "Mom" in an attempt to make him seem lovable, insisting that he be addressed as Monsieur Boucher. Charbonneau stated: "I am a woman of conviction. I don't play". Charbonneau regarded Larochelle as an arrogant grand seigneur, the type of lawyer who used to order her to get coffee when she was a legal secretary in the 1970s, and thought he had underestimated her because she was a woman. Charbonneau was convinced that Larochlle would blunder at some point and she carefully observed him, watching for any mistake on his part.

The key moment in the trial occurred when Gagné admitted to making mistakes when he gave his confession on 5 December 1997, saying he was tired. Larochelle stated: "I've seen the video. And you don't look tired." Charbonneau seized upon Larchelle's statement to show in rebuttal the videotape of Gagné, saying: "Let's see the video". In the videotape, Gagné was clearly exhausted as he had much difficulty staying awake in his chair. For the rest of the trial, Charbonneau put Larochelle on trial in a sense, portraying him as a dishonest lawyer who would tell any lie, no matter how egregious, to secure the acquittal of his client. In her final address to the jury, Charbonneau stated: "If I had not vigorously objected-an objection which my colleague so delicately described as a fit of hysterics-if I had not insisted that you see the video for yourselves, wouldn't you have been convinced, as Monsieur Larochelle had wanted, that Gagné lied when he said he was tired? Was that the search for the truth, the search for a just and fair trial?"

The jury went into deliberations on 25 April 2002. On 5 May 2002, the jury convicted Boucher of two counts of first-degree murder and one count of attempted murder. At the end of the trial, Larochelle refused to shake hands with Charbonneau and instead walked out of the courtroom. Charbonneau smiled in the courtroom and congratulated her partner Yves Pardis. After the trial, Commander André Bouchard of the Service de police de la Ville de Montréal called Charbonneau to congratulate her. Bouchard recalled: "She was crying on the phone".

== Judge ==
On the recommendation of François Rolland, then Chief Justice of the Court, Premier Jean Charest named Charbonneau to chair an inquiry into corruption in the Quebec construction industry on 9 November 2011. Charbonneau headed the inquiry—now known as the Charbonneau Commission—from 2011 to 2015. There had been a similar inquiry in 1974-1975 headed by Justice Robert Cliche that examined corruption in the construction industry. The Cliche inquiry looked into the corruption surrounding the notoriously corrupt union boss, the Mafia-linked André Desjardins, known as le roi de la construction ("the King Of Construction").

The commission started its hearings on 22 May 2012. On 15 June 2012, the former Montreal police chief Jacques Duchesneau testified at the commission that the Transport Minister Sam Hamel was indifferent to allegations of corruption in the construction industry and that 70% of all political contributions in Quebec were illegal. The next witness Charbonneau called was the Italian Mafia expert Valentina Tenti who testified that the Rizzuto family of Montreal was part of a wider international structure involving criminal elements in Italy, the United States and elsewhere. The next expert witness called to the commission was Detective Mike Amato of the York Regional Police who testified that the Mafia had taken control of a number of restaurants, transportation firms, and construction companies in both Ontario and Quebec. Charbonneau summoned as her next witness the former agent of the Federal Bureau of Investigation, Joseph D. Pistone, better known by his alias Donnie Brasco, who testified that the Mafia needed corrupt public officials to do its work. Pistone testified that the power of the Rizzuto family was only made possible by the culture of corruption in Quebec. Under his Brasco alias, Pistone had infiltrated the Bonanno family of New York between 1976 and 1981. The Rizzuto family of Montreal is merely the Canadian branch of the Bonanno family. Pistone never met Vito Rizzuto, the boss of the Rizzuto family, in his undercover work in New York, but he heard much about him.

On 27 September 2012, Lino Zambito, the former boss of the construction company Infrabec, testified that he had to pay kickbacks to win construction contracts in Montreal. Zambito stated that 2.5% of his profits had to go to the Rizzuto family, 3% to the governing Union Montreal party, and 1% to Gilles Surprenant, the chief engineer of Montreal. Zambito testified that in his invoices to the city of Montreal he billed for the wages of union workers while in fact employing illegal immigrants who were paid below the minimum wage for their work to order to pocket the difference. On 1 October 2012, Zambito testified that when the city opened up a bidding process to build the l'Acadie interchange, he received a phone call from his rival Tony Accurso, the owner of the Simard-Beaudry Construction company, who told him that he was to have the contract and wanted Zambito to drop out. Zambtio testified to resolve the dispute that he went to see Vito Rizzuto who told him that Accurso would have the contract. Zambito named the city employees Yves Themens, François Thériault, and Michel Paquette as being corrupt. Zambito further stated that city manager, Robert Abdallah and the chairman of the executive committee, Frank Zampino, were also corrupt. On 15 October 2012, Zambito testified that both the Parti libéral du Québec and the Parti Québécois had accepted illegal donations from himself in exchange for tolerating his corruption.

Charbonneau called as a witness Surprenant who confirmed Zambito's testimony. Surprenant testified that as the chief engineer of Montreal that he had taken $700, 000 in bribes. Surprenant argued that his corruption was justified as he spent much of his bribe money on gambling, which he stated created jobs in the gambling industry. Surprenant testified that construction companies routinely overbilled the city between 20%-50% in excess of the actual work done, and stated that there was nothing wrong with this as corruption in Montreal was an "open secret" that everyone knew about.

Charbonneau's next witness, Martin Dumont, a former official in the Union Montreal party testified that his former boss, Bernard Trépanier, the chief financial officer of the Union Montreal, had taken so many bribes that his office safe was overflowing with cash. Dumont testified that he and Trépanier had much difficulty in forcing all of the cash into his safe. Another city official, Luc Leclerc, testified to the commission on 31 October 2012 that he had taken $500, 000 in bribes in cash between 1995 and 2009 along with various bribes in the form of gifts that were equal in value to the cash. Leclerc testified that he done nothing wrong because corruption was the norm in Montreal and that "when in Rome, do as the Romans". On 9 November 2012, the mayor of Laval, Gilles Vaillancourt, resigned in disgrace as a number of the commission's witnesses had named him as corrupt. On 15 November 2012, the mayor of Montreal, Gérald Tremblay, resigned in disgrace as too many of the witnesses at the commission had implicated him in their corruption.

Gilles Vézina, the former chief engineer of Montreal, was called by Charbonneau as her next witness. Vézina admitted that he had taken bribes such in the form of bottles of wine, dinners at expensive restaurants, tickets to see the Montreal Canadiens hockey team play at the Molson center and the services of prostitutes hired by the construction companies. Like the other witnesses, Vézina denied having done anything wrong as he told Charbonneau that corruption had been the norm in Montreal ever since he started working for the city in 1962. Charbonneau called as a witness Martin Carrier, the owner of Les Céramiques Lindo ceramic firm based in Quebec City. Carrier testified that he had warned by the Rizzuto family not to do any more work in Montreal. In support of his claims, Carrier played an audio tape of a phone call he received in 2004 from a man speaking French with an Italian accent who told him to cease work in Montreal because otherwise "...you won't be walking away from here. You've been warned". Carrier also testified that he received further death threats from a Rizzuto family member, Francesco Del Balso, after he made a bid on a contract in Montreal. Charbonneau thanked Carrier for his "exceptional courage" in coming forward despite all of the death threats against himself and his family.

Charbonneau's next witness was Michel Leclerc, the owner of the construction company Terremex. Leclerc testified that he tried to avoid paying kickbacks to the corrupt city officials and the Rizzuto family, but was finally forced to because it was the only way to win contracts in Montreal. André Durocher, the owner of the Excavatins Panthère company, likewise testified that he was forced to pay kickbacks as the price of doing business in Montreal. Michel Cadotte, the owner of the Ipex pipe-manufacturing company testified that the city cancelled its contract to buy his Terra-Brute pipes after he refused to pay a $150, 000 bribe.

Charbonneau started January 2013 by calling as a witness, Michel Lalonde, the owner of Génius Counseil, who testified that he overbilled the city by 25%-30% in his construction work and donated the money to the politicians. In 2001 election, Lalonde had donated to the ruling mayor, Pierre Bourque, who lost the election to Tremblay. Lalonde testified that for the next two years it was impossible for Génius Counseil to win contracts until in 2003 he received a phone call from Trépanier who asked him to give $100, 000 in cash to Tremblay. After paying the $100, 000, Lalonde testified that he sat down with Trépanier who asked him what construction project he would like Génius Counseil to work on. Lalonde also testified that to win a contract in 2007 to build Autoroute 13 for the province of Quebec that he had paid $25, 000 in cash to Claude Millaire, the Transport Quebec official on charge of awarding the contract. Lalonde named as the politicians whom he paid bribes to as Joseph Magri, the former mayor of Rivière-des-Prairies–Pointe-aux-Trembles; Cosmo Maciocia, another former mayor of Rivière-des-Prairies–Pointe-aux-Trembles; Gilles Deguire, the mayor of Montréal-Nord; Robert Coutu, the mayor of Montréal-Est; Michel Bissonnet, the mayor of Saint-Leonard; and Jean-François St-Onge, a borough councilor in Ahuntsic-Cartierville. The municipalities listed by Lalonde were all known strongholds of the Rizzuto family.

The next witness Charbonneau called was Giuseppe Borsellino, the owner of Garnier Construction, who likewise testified that he paid bribes to win contracts, saying that it was the only way possible to win a contract from the corrupt city officials. Borsellino testified that he had paid $50, 000 to give a free vacation in Italy to Robert Marcil, the chief of Montreal's Public Works department, as the price of winning a contract. Charbonneau questioned Borsellino about an incident in 2009 when three men broke into his office and beat him bloody. Borsellino said he had no idea why he was beaten. Charbonneau was displeased with this answer and told him: "If you were beaten to the point that you were disfigured and had to be hospitalized for a reconstruction of your face, you must have some idea why you were beaten like that?" Borsellino answered her: "I have some ideas. Maybe I didn't pay my debts. Maybe I didn't do a job well. It was maybe two or three reasons. I did not make a complaint and I went on to my business and went back to work". When Charbonneau suggested that it was Rizzuto family thugs who had beaten him in his office, Borsellino admitted that he was a friend of Rizzuto family as he came from the same town in Sicily as they did, but denied that it was the Rizzuto family who had him beaten.

Charbonneau had the commission played by a secret video recording made by the Royal Canadian Mounted Police where a construction company boss, Nicolo Milioto, arrived at the Consenza Social Club and handed a bag of cash to Nicolo Rizzuto. After counting the money, Rizzuto handed some of the cash back to Milioto, which he hid in his socks. Milioto visited Rizzuto at the Consenza Social Club 236 times between 2004 and 2006. Charbonneau had Milioto called as a witness. Milioto, known in Montreal as "Mr. Sidewalk", was accused of collecting kickbacks and extortion payments from the construction companies, which he handed over personally to Rizzuto. Milioto spoke with much fear in his voice as he denied that doing anything illegal as he claimed that he routinely performed "errands" for Rizzuto for which he was paid hundreds of dollars per errand. Milioto denied knowing what the Mafia was as he claimed "I don't know" when asked if he knew what the Mafia was. When Charbonneau asked Milioto if he was aware of pizzo (protection money), Miloto stated: "I come from Italy, Madame, I know what a pizzo is". However, Milioto claimed he had never paid pizzo in Canada and was unaware of any other Canadian businessmen who had paid pizzo. Of all the witnesses called by Charbonneau, Milioto provoked the most ridicule as the journalist Jerry Langton wrote that Milioto's testimony was "ludicrous" as he made a number of highly unlikely claims to explain his behavior.

Charbonneau's next witness, Charles Meunier, the owner of the BPR construction firm, testified he had to pay bribes because it was the only way to win contracts in Montreal. Charbonneau then summoned as her next witness, Yves Cadotte, the vice-president of SNC-Lavalin, who testified that his company had given $1 million in illegal donations annually to both the Parti libéral du Québec and the Parti Québécois for decades as part of the normal cost of doing business in Quebec. When Charbonneau asked Cadotte why SNC-Lavalin had given so much money in illegal donations, he answered her by saying: "We want to make sure we can take in our activities and so we agree to the demands that are made". The new mayor of Montreal, Michael Applebaum, in a speech on 21 March 2013 attacked Charbonneau, saying it was impossible for the city to have its potholes fixed because all of the construction companies in Montreal had been named as corrupt by her commission. Appelbaum's speech was widely seen as a crude threat to the people of Montreal to accept corruption as the price of having potholes fixed.

Charbonneau summoned as a witness Trépanier, whose nickname in Montreal was Monsieur trois pour cent ("Mr. Three Percent"). Trépanier testified that no one in Quebec had ever followed the rules on campaign donations and that illegal campaign donations were the norm. Trépanier, who was very nervous when giving his testimony as Charbonneau had reminded him that he could indicted for perjury if he was caught out in a lie, denied all of the allegations against him, saying the Monsieur trois pour cent nickname was a "smear" made up by his enemies.

On 17 June 2013, Applebaum was arrested for corruption, leading him to resign as mayor in disgrace. Charbonneau's next witness was Sergeant Alain Belleau of the Sûreté du Québec who testified that the Hells Angels were actively involved in the Quebec construction industry. During the hearings, the name of Larry Amero was mentioned as a Hells Angel from British Columbia who had moved to Montreal to replace the Hells Angels arrested in Operation SharQC in 2009. Charbonneau called as her next witness Paul Sauvé, the owner of LM Sauvé construction company, who testified that he was forced to take on the Hells Angel Normand "Casper" Quimet as a business partner in his firm after receiving death threats from the Hells Angels. Sauvé also testified that André Boisclair, the former leader of the PQ, had given LM Sauvé a secret provincial subsidy of $2.5 million in 2003 in exchange for illegal campaign donations to the PQ.

The next witness to be called by Charbonneau was Ken Pereira, a high-ranking official in the Fédération des travailleurs et travailleuses du Québec (FTQ) trade union. Pereira testified that the Hells Angels had taken control of the FTQ union and that the 2008 leadership race for presidency of the FTQ had been rigged by the Hells Angels to allow their candidate, Jacques Émond, to win. Pereira also showed documents that revealed that Jocelyn Dupuis, the boss of the FTQ's construction arm, had billed his union $50, 000 in fraudulent expenses. When Dupuis was called as a witness, he denied allegations of corruption, but admitted he helped Raynald Desjardins of the Rizzuto family win several construction contracts by removing his name from any documentation relating to the contracts.

The Commission issued its final report on 24 November 2015. Langton wrote: "As revealing as the Charbonneau Commission was, I'm not sure it actually accomplished that much work". Langton wrote that the root problem in the Quebec construction industry was not the Rizzuto family nor the Hells Angels, but rather the climate of corruption which allowed these criminal syndicates to flourish, which the Charbonneau commission failed to address.

== In popular culture ==
Charbonneau was portrayed by Claudia Ferri in the television drama series Bad Blood, which debuted in 2017, surrounding the Rizzuto crime family.

== Books ==
- Langton, Jerry (2015). Cold War How Organized Crime Works in Canada and Why It's About to Get More Violent. Toronto: HarperColllins. ISBN 978-1-4434-3255-9.
- Sher, Julian; Marsden, William (2003). The Road To Hell How the Biker Gangs Are Conquering Canada. Toronto: Alfred Knopf. ISBN 0-676-97598-4.
