= André Desjardins =

Canadian loan shark and drug smuggler

- Born: André Desjardins; 4 July 1930; Montreal, Quebec, Canada
- Died: 27 April 2000 (aged 69); Montreal, Quebec, Canada.
- Other name: Dédé
- Occupation: Gangster
- Years active: 1949–2000
- Known for: Assisting the Mafia to take over Quebec construction unions

André "Dédé" Desjardins (4 July 1930 – 27 April 2000) was a Canadian union official noted for his involvement with organized crime. Desjardins served as the president of the Conseil des métiers de la construction (transl. Council of Construction Trades) and vice-president of the Fédération des travailleurs du Québec (Quebec Federation of Labour, FTQ) union between 1970 and 1974, becoming known as Le roi de la construction ("the king of construction"). During this time, Desjardins was involved in the scandal that led to the Cliche commission of 1974–75 headed by Judge Robert Cliche to examine corruption in Quebec construction unions. Afterwards, Desjardins enjoyed much success as one of the leading loan sharks in Montreal until his murder. Despite sharing the same surname, Desjardins is not related to Raynald Desjardins, a notorious mobster related to the Rizzuto crime family.

== Rise to power ==
Desjardins was born in the Centre-Sud of Montreal, the son of a plumber, and grew up in poverty. Desjardins went to work as an apprentice plumber at the age of 14, and had a long criminal record as a young man, doing several short stints in prison. In 1949, Desjardins was convicted of robbery and was convicted several more times in the 1950s. In 1957, he joined local 144 of l'Association internationale des plombiers et tuyauteurs d'Amérique union, which he rapidly came to dominate. During this time, Desjardins started to engage in organized crime, running illegal lotteries, demanding payments from construction companies to avoid "delays", engaging in loan sharking, and formed ties with the Montreal Mafia. Desjardins recruited men with criminal records to serve as his officials or "soldiers" as he called them, and rose up rapidly using violence and intimidation. Desjardins ran his loan sharking business from the Café Évangéline, and was so successful that he lent money to other criminals in Montreal, most notably Eugene Lafort, Gérald Fontaine (who was the father of Hells Angel Paul "Fon Fon" Fontaine), and members of the Devils Disciples outlaw motorcycle gang.

The Canadian journalist Michel Auger described Desjardins as a "strong man" who frequently beat anyone who displeased him, and who was much feared in the construction industry in Montreal in the 1960s. Henri Masse, the president of the Quebec Federation of Labor, told the journalist Jerry Langton about Desjardins: "He was a tough guy. But at the same time, you have to remember labor relations back then were tough as well. During strikes, employers would use dogs and thugs and other means". Though capable of being charming and a professed friend of journalists, Desjardins was known for his ruthless methods, at one point leading a delegation of construction workers to storm the National Assembly in Quebec City while the assembly was in session to shut down a meeting of a parliamentary committee that was proposing a bill he disapproved of. Desjardins's tactics paid off and the bill was killed.

== Le roi de la construction ==
A man with an engaging manner and immense powers of leadership noted for his walrus mustache, Desjardins quickly rose up the ranks of the union, becoming the general manager of the Construction Trades Council union affiliated with the FTQ and in September 1970 become the vice-president of the FTQ. Desjardins was well known for his lavish lifestyle, which went beyond a union official's salary, wearing a large diamond ring, owning a white Cadillac and frequently taking vacations in Haiti and the Dominican Republic. Desjardins's lifestyle and his domination of a union of 70,000 members gave him the moniker the "King of Construction" (Le roi de la construction). Desjardins had "soldiers" in every union local, who were expected to engage in intimidation and violence, and other criminal activities like drug dealing and extortion. Desjardins was very closely associated with the Mafia during his time as union chief, and his time as president of the Conseil des métiers de la construction union is remembered as a "reign of terror" in the construction industry in Quebec. Auger described Desjardins's time as the "King of Construction" as the take-over of an entire section of the economy by organized crime, through he argued that Desjardins for his all power, was just a French-Canadian frontman for the Montreal Mafia, who wanted control of all the construction unions in Quebec, not just in Montreal. As part of his investigation into Desjardins undertaken in 1972, Auger took photographs of Desjardins on vacation in the Dominican Republic with Louis Laberge, president of the FTQ, together with various Mafiosi and other members of the Montreal underworld. Desjardins was aligned with the Cotroni family, at the time the most powerful Mafia family in Montreal.

Construction had boomed in Montreal for Expo 67, leading to an inflated workforce, and afterwards times were tough for the construction industry in Montreal. As the Liberal Premier Robert Bourassa had promised in the 1970 election that his government would create 100,000 jobs in the construction industry with the James Bay Project, there was much violent competition between Desjardin's Conseil des métiers de la construction and the rival Confederation of National Trade Unions (CNFU) to have their workers engaged in the project. The Canadian historian Desmond Morton noted that were 540 different incidents between the two main construction unions in Quebec on construction sites associated with the James Bay Project between 1970 and 1974, many of them "very bloody".

Besides for the James Bay Project, Desjardins's union played a major role in causing the $1 billion cost overrun on building the facilities for the 1976 Olympics in Montreal, which nearly bankrupted the city. In May 1970, the International Olympic Committee declared that Montreal would host the 1976 Summer Olympics and construction of the facilities for the Olympics began later that year. The Montreal journalist Kristian Gravenor called Desjardins a "legendary" criminal who more than anyone else caused the "screwed up Olympics" that almost bankrupted Montreal and did so much to cause the decline of Montreal, which lost its status as the business capital of Canada to Toronto in the 1970s. The French architect Roger Taillibert and the Montreal mayor Jean Drapeau discovered that various "delays" on building the Olympic stadium were caused by the Conseil des métiers de la construction, and the two tried hard to win over Desjardins, buying him a lunch at the exclusive Ritz-Carlton hotel in a vain attempt to end the "anarchic disorder" on the Olympic stadium construction site. Finally, Bourassa made a secret deal to buy off Desjardins, which finally allowed work to proceed. In his 2000 book Notre Cher Stade Olympique, Taillibert wrote "If the Olympic Games took place, it was thanks to Dede Desjardins. What irony!".

On 21 March 1974 as part of an extortion attempt against the sub-contractors working on the James Bay Project who refused to fire two workers belonging to the rival CNFU union, workers belonging to Conseil des métiers de la construction union destroyed the LG-2 construction site, causing $35 million in damages. The workers on the LG-2 site used their bulldozers to destroy the site they were working on while other workers set buildings afire. Desjardins was charged with incitement to violence as a result of the riot, but was never brought to trial. In response to the violence at the LG-2 site, which confirmed long-standing rumors about thuggish practices on the part of construction unions, the Premier of Quebec, Robert Bourassa, appointed a commission consisting of well-respected judge Robert Cliche, prominent Montreal labor lawyer Brian Mulroney and vice-president of the Centrale de l'enseignement du Québec Guy Chevrette to investigate corruption in the construction industry in Quebec. The legal counsel to the Cliche commission was another prominent Montreal lawyer, Lucien Bouchard. The commission had a narrow remit to examine only the question of freedom of expression within Quebec construction unions, but the commission soon began examining the question of the relationship between the construction unions and organized crime.

The Cliche commission established that the Quebec construction industry was dominated by casual brutality with thuggish union bosses teaching union organizers how best to break legs. Workers who complained about corruption on the part of their bosses had their dogs murdered and their teenage children beaten up. The columnist Peggy Curran wrote that the Cliche commission uncovered:

...tales of nepotism, bribery, sabotage, blackmail and intimidation; charges of union organizers with criminal records who gave lessons in how to break legs; thugs-for-hire who would happily beat up a rival union organizer's teenager or strangle their dog. Almost as frightening was an aura of complacency, a 'So what?' and 'What you gonna do about it?' reaction from key witnesses and from union rank-and file. As one union delegate put it, "How do you think a government commission is going to settle problems if the workers themselves are not willing to respect the law? By increasing the number of baseball bats in circulation?".

During the hearings, a connection was established between Bourassa's office and Desjardins. It emerged that Bourassa's special executive assistant, Paul Desrochers, had met Desjardins to ask for the support of his union in helping the Parti libéral du Québec win a by-election in exchange for which the province would guarantee that only companies employing workers from the Conseil des métiers de la construction union would work on the James Bay project. The hearings had already established that the Conseil des métiers de la construction had donated to the Parti libéral du Québec generously and there were links between several ministers in Bourassa's cabinet and the Conseil des métiers de la construction. An aide to the Labour Minister, Jean Cournoyer, was overheard in an intercepted telephone call to Desjardins arranging for him to have his thuggish "soldiers" pack a reelection rally for Cournoyer in his St. Jerome riding. Cliche asked Cornoyer: "How could you tolerate illegal acts without doing anything? The disruption of a parliamentary commission by union goons, for example?" In response, Cournoyer replied: "I am only the labor minister. I don’t have the police". The exchanges between Cournoyer and Cliche grew increasingly heated as Cournoyer disclaimed responsibility for his portfolio under that the grounds that he was too busy to look into allegations of union corruption, leading Cliche to scold him: "“Responsibility, and I’m talking on a much higher plane, responsibility for a ministry and its faults cannot be explained by saying: 'I don’t have time' or 'I’ve got too much work'". Bouchard had wanted to call Bourassa as a witness to testify about his links with Desjardins, but Mulroney prevented this, saying having the Premier of Quebec testify before the commission would be a violation of "executive privilege".

Intercepted phone calls by the Sûreté du Québec showed that Desjardins had ordered a set of illegal strikes in the summer of 1974 as a bid to pressure the government not to have him testify before the Cliche commission. Despite his best efforts, Desjardins did testify before the Cliche commission, which damaged his reputation so much that he resigned as union boss on 25 November 1974. The commissioners grilled Desjardins over his association with members of the Mafia, and his denials of not being involved in organized crime proved to be ultimately unconvincing. Bouchard in a 2000 interview with Auger recalled that Desjardins was one of the toughest and wiliest witnesses he ever cross-examined. The climax of the hearings came when Cliche exploded in rage at Desjardins's evasive answers, shouting: "You have played a very important role as a union leader and thousands of Quebec workers looked up to you for inspiration, workers who were proud of you...but you have allowed exploiters to surround you. You practised a coverup from all points of view. The commission very sincerely hopes that when our work is finished the workers in the construction industry are going to find leaders who are capable of honor, dignity and truth".

The Cliche Commission, in its report of May 1975 called Desjardins a man "with exceptional qualities ... spoiled by an unbridled taste for power." The Cliche commission wrote about Desjardins:

le leader syndical déchu est un ami intime de criminels notoires dont Francesco Fuoco, auteur d'un hold-up et "soldat" du mafiosi Vincent Cotroni, Jean-Louis Robinson, abattu dans un règlement de comptes et Eugène Lefort, surnommé le "caïd de la Rive-Sud".

Translation:

the deposed union leader is a close friend of notorious criminals including Francesco Fuoco, organizer of a robbery and a "soldier" of the mafiosi Vincenzo Cotroni, Jean-Louis Robinson, shot in a settling of accounts and Eugene Lefort, nicknamed the "boss from the South Shore"

The Cliche commission's report concluded Desjardins had frequently used "threats, violence and intimidation against both workers and management", that too many construction companies had given into him rather than stand up, that his status as le roi de la construction had allowed him to corrupt politicians, and his passion for money and power "... controls him to the extent of destroying his moral sense. To him, there are no bad methods, only inefficient ones". The report recommended that Desjardins be prevented from holding any more union offices as it was "in the public interest".

The Cliche Commission's report was described at the time as an exposé of "an organized system of corruption without parallel in North America." A Montreal Gazette editorial declared about the Cliche commission's report: "A devastating document. For some four years, the Bourassa government worked hand in glove with gangster union leadership in the province's construction industry." The public backlash generated by the Cliche commission's discovery of widespread corruption in the construction unions tolerated by the Bourassa government played a major role in causing the defeat of Bourassa in the 1976 election, which were won by the separatist PQ.

== The loan shark of Montreal ==
After his leaving the union, Desjardins turned to loan sharking and drug smuggling. Desjardins was notorious as a loan shark who charged 52% interest on the loans he gave to the poor and desperate of Montreal. Desjardins was often described by the police as one of the most successful loan sharks in Montreal, whose fortune by the 1990s was estimated to be at least $25 million. Auger quoted one of Desjardins friends as saying: "He liked money too much. Always wanted more. Couldn't get enough of it".

Desjardins opened a restaurant in Laval, two jewelry shops, a furniture store, and a 25-room motel in the Dominican Republic, hiding his ownership via a convoluted ownership structure. On 3 February 1979, Desjardins and his wife Jacqueline were indicted on charges of tax evasion with Desjardins accused of not paying $42,436.07 between 1967 and 1975. After defeating the tax evasion charges, Desjardins was tried for trafficking in stolen tires and for ordering an illegal strike in the early 1980s, but was acquitted of these charges. Desjardins spent much time living in the Dominican Republic, where he spent his winters at a luxury beach-front condo he owned in Puerto Plata. Desjardins had much influence in the Dominican Republic, where he demanded a "cut" from any developer wishing to build in that country. In July 1983, the United States government requested his extradition, charging he was trafficking in the Quaaludes prescription drug, but in 1984 a Montreal court refused the request.

Despite leaving the Conseil des métiers de la construction union in 1974, Desjardins still retained much influence in construction unions for decades afterwards. Desjardins had been associated with the Calabrian Cotroni crime family headed by the Cotroni brothers, Vic and Frank, which from the 1930s to the 1980s was the largest criminal syndicate in Montreal. In the 1980s, the Cotroni family were eclipsed by the Sicilian Rizzuto crime family led by Nicolo Rizzuto as Montreal's largest criminal syndicate. The Rizzuto family had a policy of co-opting former associates of the Cotroni family into their operations. Desjardins was one of the former Cotroni associates who switched his loyalties. In his last years, Desjardins, who had become one of the leading loan sharks in Montreal, became very close to Maurice "Mom" Boucher, the president of the Quebec branch of the Hells Angels. Together with his business partner Robert Savard, Desjardins was reported to have made "millions" in loans to the Hells Angels and in laundering the profits of drug dealing for the Angels in the 1990s.

== Murder ==
On 26 April 2000, Desjardins had lunch with Boucher at a popular Montreal restaurant, Shawn's, to discuss business matters. Shawn's was well known in Montreal for its buxom waitresses whose "uniforms" were string bikinis, giving the restaurant a disreputable image. Over breakfast, Boucher asked Desjardins to forgive a $400,000 loan with 52% interest that a friend of his had taken out and was struggling to repay, and was told by Desjardins "fuck you!" as he never forgave loans. Desjardins, who was 23 years older than Boucher, told him that he did not take orders from the Hells Angels and reminded him that he had powerful friends in the Mafia, the police and in Quebec politics, saying he was not afraid of Boucher at all. Boucher replied: "You are going to calm down and you are going to forget about it. Get the fuck back there [Puerto Plata] and have some fun, OK?" Desjardins in turn informed Boucher: "Over my dead fucking body! If you think that prick's going to get way with some $400,000". Desjardins was interrupted by Boucher who told him: "I'm telling ya, okay, knock it off". Boucher asked Desjardins to meet him again for breakfast at Shawn's the next day to further discuss the matter, a request that Desjardins agreed to. However, Boucher did not appear at Shawn's as he had promised.

After having breakfast at Shawn's on the morning of 27 April, while getting into his automobile, Desjardins was shot in the back 11 times by an unknown gunman who used a semi-automatic handgun equipped with a silencer. The assassin left the weapon at the crime scene and was picked up by a van in the Shawn's parking lot immediately after he killed Desjardins. The police described the assassination as a highly professional killing, saying this was not the work of an amateur assassin, which supports the theory that the assassin was either a member of the Rock Machine or the Hells Angels.

Supporting the theory that the Hells Angels had killed Desjardins, was the fact that twenty minutes after his murder, a Hells Angel in Montreal phoned another Hells Angel vacationing in the Dominican Republic. Unaware that his phone had been tapped by the police, the caller in Montreal said in French "Okay, go ahead" and then hung up. At about 10:30 am on the same day as Desjardins's assassination, a group of men broke into Desjardins's condo in Puerto Plata, where they reportedly found some $5 million in cash stored in the safe. Later the same day, Commander André Bouchard of the Montreal police arrived at the Au Bon Pain Café to personally arrest Boucher and ask him what he knew about the murder of Desjardins, in particular why he did not have breakfast with Desjardins that day as he had promised to do the previous day. Boucher refused to speak without his lawyer present. Later the same afternoon, Boucher gave a statement at the Montreal police station in the presence of his lawyer Gilbert Frigon, claiming that he did not meet Desjardins at Shawn's that day because he was so bored with talking to him the previous day. With a noticeable lack of emotion, Boucher told Commander Bouchard that it was a "sad thing" that his friend Desjardins had been murdered and would call him at once "if he heard anything".

Stéphane "Godasse" Gagné, the Hells Angel assassin who later turned Crown's evidence, testified at Boucher's trial in 2002 that Boucher resented the power of the Mafia and was planning to drive them out of Montreal altogether, but was waiting until he won the Quebec biker war with the Rock Machine before taking on the Mafia. However, Gagné testified that Boucher wanted to eliminate people like Desjardins and the French-Canadian criminals willing to work with the Mafia, as an interim measure as a way of weakening the power of the Mafia before taking them on outright. Boucher's friend who was struggling with the loan was a man who had associations with the Rizzuto crime family, the most powerful Mafia family in Canada and was not a Hells Angel. Langton argued that Boucher had chosen to use a case of an Italo-Canadian struggling with an unpayable loan as an excuse to eliminate Desjardins without arousing the suspicions of his nominal ally, Vito Rizzuto.

The journalists Julian Sher and William Marsden wrote that Desjardins's murder was not "an isolated killing", but rather "the beginning of a new era of consolidation of the Hells' now massive drug empire, which extended throughout Quebec and the Maritimes and was fast spreading into Ontario and western Canada". Desjardins's business partner Savard was killed on 7 July 2000 after having breakfast with Boucher on the previous day and by October 2000, there had been 11 murders of "independent" gangsters not with the Rizzuto family who had previously been allies of the Hells Angels. In June 2000, Sandra Craig, the daughter of a Bolivian gangster, was almost killed by the Hells Angels and on 29 August 2000, her Canadian husband Raymond Craig was killed by the Angels. The Craigs had previously been the main link between the Colombian gangsters, the Rizzuto family and the Hells Angels in Montreal. Auger, the crime correspondent with Le Journal de Montréal who was investigating Desjardins's murder in the summer of 2000, reported in a series of articles that summer in Le Journal de Montréal that Boucher was systematically killing off his allies. Auger was shot in the back by a Hells Angel on 13 September 2000 in the parking lot of Le Journal de Montréal, an attack that Auger noted was very similar to the "hit" on Desjardins with the only difference being that he survived the five bullets that were pumped into his back. Auger noted it was the same type of gun used in both the Desjardins murder and the attempted murder of himself, namely a .22 Ruger handgun modified with a silencer. Commander Bouchard arrested Charles Michel Vézina, a gunsmith for the Montreal underworld for supplying the guns used for the murder of Desjardins and the attempted murder of Auger, and he was sentenced to four years in prison for violating Canada's gun laws. Commander Bouchard has stated there it was the same Hells Angel who attempted to kill Auger that killed Desjardins, but given the unwillingness of Vézina to testify, there was insufficient evidence to charge him.

== Legacy ==
The reforms that the Cliche commission had recommended were supposed to have ended the influence of organized crime and corruption within Quebec construction unions. But after a number of buildings collapsed in 2010–2011 due to poor construction, in 2011 Quebec premier Jean Charest appointed the Charbonneau Commission headed by Madame France Charbonneau, which discovered the same sort of rampant corruption and Mafia influences in Quebec construction unions that the Cliche commission of 1974–75 had discovered, suggesting that the reforms had failed to achieve their purpose.

== See also ==
- List of unsolved murders (2000–present)
