= David Cliche =

Canadian politician (1952–2020)

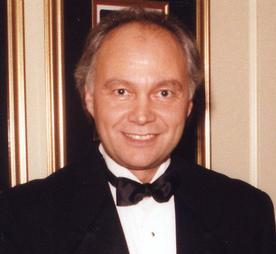

Member of the National Assembly of Quebec for Vimont
- In office September 12, 1994 – January 30, 2002
- Preceded by: Benoît Fradet
- Succeeded by: François Gaudreau

Personal details
- Born: July 10, 1952 Saint-Joseph-de-Beauce, Quebec
- Died: July 19, 2020 (aged 68)
- Party: Parti Québécois
- Parent(s): Robert Cliche; Madeleine Ferron

David Cliche (July 10, 1952 – July 19, 2020) was a politician in Quebec. He represented Vimont in the National Assembly of Quebec from 1994 to 2002, as a member of the Parti Québécois.

He was the son of lawyer and former head of the New Democratic Party of Quebec, Robert Cliche and writer Madeleine Ferron. Cliche earned a bachelor's degree in Geology and a master's degree in Development from the University of Montreal (1977) and then began a career in environmental management.

Cliche ran for the Parti Québécois in the constituency of Vimont in 1989 but was defeated by Benoît Fradet of the Liberal Party, in 1994 he ran again and this time defeated Fradet and was part of the Parti Québécois government of Lucien Bouchard; he was re-elected in 1998.

Cliche held several ministerial positions in the governments of Lucien Bouchard and Bernard Landry: he was Minister of Environment and Wildlife (1996–1997), Minister for Tourism (1997–1998), Minister for the Information Highway and Government Services (1998-2001) and Minister for Research, Science and Technology (2001–2002).

Cliche resigned from his position as Minister and MNA for Vimont on January 30, 2002. After leaving politics, he worked as an environmental consultant.

Quebec provincial government of Bernard Landry
Cabinet post (1)
Predecessor	Office	Successor
Jean Rochon	Minister for Research, Science and Technology; March 8, 2001–January 30, 2002	Solange Charest
Quebec provincial government of Lucien Bouchard
Cabinet posts (3)
Predecessor	Office	Successor
Ministry Established	Minister for the Information Highway and Government Services; December 15, 1998–March 8, 2001	Ministry Abolished
Rita Dionne-Marsolais	Minister of Tourism; August 25, 1997–December 15, 1998	Maxime Arseneau
Jacques Brassard	Minister of Environment and Wildlife; January 29, 1996–August 25, 1997	Paul Bégin
