= Madeleine Ferron =

Canadian writer

Madeleine Ferron (July 24, 1922 – February 27, 2010) was a Canadian writer.

== Biography ==
She was born in Louiseville, Quebec. She began her early studies with the Sisters of Saint Anne, continuing at the Université de Montréal and Université Laval. She married Robert Cliche, a lawyer, in 1945.

A writer and novelist, she also worked as a government commissioner and radio show host. She wrote for several magazines, notably Châtelaine and L'actualité. Ferron tried to analyse lucidly the often obscure emotions of her literary characters. She was the sister of writer Jacques Ferron and painter and stained glass artist Marcelle Ferron. She died in February 2010 in Quebec City, Quebec.

Her son David Cliche served in the National Assembly of Quebec as a Parti Québécois MNA.

== Awards and honours ==
- 1992 - Knight of the National Order of Quebec
- Prix des Éditions La Presse
- Prix France-Québec
- Prix littéraire de la ville de Montréal

== Publications ==
- La Fin des loups-garous, 1966
- Cœur de sucre, 1966
- Le baron écarlate, 1971
- Quand le peuple fait la loi, 1972
- Les beaucerons, ces insoumis, 1735-1867 : petite histoire de la Beauce, 1974
- Le chemin des dames, 1977
- Histoires édifiantes, 1981
- Sur le chemin Craig, 1983
- Un Singulier amour, 1987
- Le Grand théâtre, 1989
- Adrienne, 1993
- La Tricheuse 1977
