= André Bouchard (policeman) =

Canadian police officer

- Born: 1950 (age 75–76); Montreal, Quebec, Canada
- Police career
- Department: Montreal Police Service
- Service years: 1970–2004
- Rank: Commander

André Bouchard (born 1950) is a retired police officer with the Service de police de la Ville de Montréal, best known for his role in the Quebec Biker War.

== Early life ==
Bouchard was born in Montreal, the son of a Second World War veteran who served in the Royal Canadian Air Force and as a policeman with the Sûreté du Québec. Bouchard grew up in the Hochelaga-Maisonneuve district of Montreal and speaks his joual (Quebec French) with a strong working-class accent. All of Bouchard's brothers also became policemen.

== Police career ==
=== Early career ===
In June 1970, Bouchard joined the Montreal Police, where he often fought with the outlaw bikers that infested Montreal, especially members of the Popeye Moto Club. Bouchard stated in an interview: "Don't forget this was before the Charter of Rights. You saw a guy walking up the street in his colours, you kicked the shit out of him and that was it". Bouchard recalled that when he saw members of the Popeyes wearing their grey jackets, he would beat them as he told them: "What did we tell you last time? We'd rip the shit out of his colours and throw them on the floor. And then we'd walk way. That was the way it worked. It was [biker] grey or [police] blue". Bouchard argued outlaw bikers only respect violence, and it was necessary to beat them. At a sensitivity class intended to teach the police about the outlaw biker subculture in the early 1970s, a group of bikers were brought in and one of them wanted to know how the police should react if he say something to the police, leading to Bouchard to reply that he would assault any biker who said such things to himself with his nightstick. Bouchard was expelled from the class and he stated: "The bikers didn't like me since, and I don't like them since. I always hated these guys. I would see them on the streets and they'd piss me off. I just didn't like them".

The Popeyes, whom Bouchard enjoyed beating up, were considered to be the most violent of the 350 or so outlaw biker gangs in Quebec in the 1960s-1970s. Bouchard stated the principle rivals of the Popeyes, namely Satan's Choice and the Devil's Disciples, were no-where close to be the same level of viciousness displayed by the Popyeyes. Bouchard also served on the police hockey team where he excelled at fighting. The journalists Julien Sher and William Marsden described Bouchard as a man weighing 149 pounds with a "compact, lean" look and a very combative streak.

About the Irish-Canadian West End Gang, Bouchard stated the West End Gang were considerably more sophisticated and competent gang of criminals than was the norm in Montreal who excelled at robberies and hijacking. On 5 December 1977, the Popeyes, considered to be the most violent of Quebec's 350 outlaw biker clubs, joined the Hells Angels. Bouchard has accused the police leaders of ignoring the Hells Angels, which led to the rapid growth of the gang as the main criminal syndicates in Montreal. In the early 1980s, Bouchard first encountered his archenemy, Maurice "Mom" Boucher, who was a member of a white supremacist biker gang called the SS.

Bouchard feels that the current police methods have declined from the "old school" policing methods used in the 1970s, recalling: "We prowled, we didn't patrol. And we listened. We don't have tough cops anymore. I don't want to sound like a dinosaur, but they have taken that physical aspect out of it. Today we have to be the 'smiley little cop'". Bouchard argues that way the police used to patrol their neighborhoods on foot building up a rapport with the local people, which in turn allowed the police to amass intelligence on the local criminals, and that by contrast having the police patrol the neighborhoods in their cars has led to a loss of intelligence and trust.

=== Major Crimes Unit ===
In the 1980s and 1990s, Bouchard served as the head of the Montreal police's Major Crimes Unit and as chief of the Homicide Unit from 2000 to 2004. During his time as a detective, he became rather jaded as he reported that most of the victims of robberies were just as dishonest as the thieves, stating the victims of robberies routinely lied about the extent of their losses to collect more insurance money. Bouchard developed a grudging respect for the West End Gang, whom he stated "weren't thugs selling drugs on the street like the French and the Italians... They had the best safecrackers and the best truck hijackers. Some of those guys were sixteen years old and today they're still at it".

Bouchard expresses much contempt for Jean Beval, a former Montreal police officer who has been accused of fraud several times, calling him a disgraceful man who crossed the line into criminality as an undercover policeman, and then made allegations against the police as a way of distracting attention from his own misdeeds. Bouchard has called Beval a "lunatic" and called his allegations that the Montreal police "executed" the bank robber and mass murderer Richard Blass in 1975, who was killed in a shoot-out with the police, baseless. Likewise, he rejects Beval's allegations that the Montreal police "executed" the West End Gang member John Slawvey, who was killed in a shoot-out with the police in 1976. Bouchard has described the gangster Gerald Matticks as one of the most powerful criminals in Montreal, saying that in the 1980s almost every drug dealer he arrested mentioned that he had purchased cocaine from Matticks.

Bouchard had expressed much anger at Dominic Taddeo, the CEO of the Montreal Port Authority who has often claimed there is no corruption in the Port of Montreal. About these claims, Bouchard has stated that man who really runs the Port of Montreal is Matticks, saying: "Nothing comes out of the harbor until Matticks says it comes out of the harbor. How the hell can Taddeo honestly say on camera that it's the best-run business? What are you, blind?"

Bouchard made a point of cracking down on child prostitution during his time as the chief of the Major Crimes Unit, which led to unfavorable comparisons with Vancouver where hardly anyone had been arrested for soliciting the services of child prostitutes, with only 40 arrests between 1989 and 1999. Bouchard was quoted as saying: "I'm not saying we're better than anyone else. But it's a priority here, and if we get any information about juveniles, we just drop everything and deal with it".

=== The Quebec Biker War ===
During the Quebec Biker War of 1994 to 2003, Bouchard was the public face of the Montreal police, giving television briefings on the biker war and as such became very well known in Montreal. Bouchard stated that when the Quebec biker war started in 1994, it was not regarded as a major issue by the Montreal police. Bouchard told the Montreal journalists Julian Sher and William Marsden: "I'll tell you honestly, the department didn't give two shits. They're killing each other. I would give a hell if some guy pops somebody who just got out of jail. No. We didn't give a shit". Bouchard stated that it was only after the 11 year boy Daniel Desrochers was killed by the shrapnel from a Hells Angels planted bomb that the department became serious about the biker war.

In 1995, Bouchard joined the Carcajou (Wolverine) squad, a task force made of detectives from the Royal Canadian Mounted Police (RCMP), the Sûreté du Québec (SQ), and the Service de police de la Ville de Montréal (SPVM) intended to end the Quebec biker war. The journalists Julien Sher and William Marsden called Bouchard "a wily street cop" whose attitude towards the bikers was to "hit them hard and hit them often".

Bouchard his section of the Carcajou squad to make a series of raids of Hells Angels clubhouses and houses of members in Quebec City, Sherbrooke and other small towns, hoping that the arrests might lead to a junior member cutting a deal with the Crown to testify against a senior member, which in turn might inspire more senior members to make a plea bargain. Members of the Hells Angels intimidated members of the police forces in the small towns of Quebec along the St. Lawrence River by talking about the families of the policemen arresting them, leading for Bouchard to personally lead raids dressed in his full dress uniform with his name prominently displayed to show that he was not intimidated. Bouchard recalled about the raids: "We'd go down there and line the guys up on the floor and I'd say, 'Everybody shut the fuck up!' I wanted them to know who I was. We come from Montreal. So don't talk about my wife and my kids 'cause I'll shoot ya!". Bouchard described the Carcajou squad as well-funded with the best equipment and modern computers, but was rendered ineffective because of in-fighting and personality clashes between the RCMP and the Sûreté du Québec detectives assigned to the squad. During a visit to Quebec City, Bouchard was shocked to see members of the SQ assigned to the Carcajou squad having a wild party at a local restaurant, recalling: "I walk in and they got a party going on in there. This was a sit-down supper, you know – booze and wine at $50 a bottle. Nobody's paying. And you're starting to think 'what the fuck's going on here?' Is this a protected bar? Ah okay. So they never down a Hells Angel or a Rock Machine or someone who's in the bar. They let him alone. That's not good".

Bouchard also complained that the SQ detectives would bring in outrageous expense accounts, which led to difficult relations as he felt the SQ detectives should not be staying at expensive hotels. Bouchard further noted that the SQ detectives once told him that a shipment of dynamite was being brought into Montreal, leading for Bouchard to order the SWAT team to be ready, only for the SQ detectives to tell that it was unnecessary as the man bringing in the dynamite was a police informer, leading for Bouchard to shout "You don't do that! A source cannot be involved in a crime". Finally, Bouchard charged the SQ detectives would not share information with him which led to a dysfunctional working environment. In 1996, Bouchard left the Carcajou squad out of disgust with its ineffectiveness, and instead studied for the commander's exams. Later in 1996, Bouchard was promoted to the rank of commander.

Following the murders of two prison guards in 1997 by the Hells Angels, Bouchard launched Project HARM in November 1997, launching a series of raids that led to the closure of 20 bars controlled by the bikers. On 4 December 1997, Bouchard was in Big Bertha as the police mobile command bus is known in Montreal, when he received a call for help from a policeman at a strippers' agency while in the background a man was heard to say "You think you have enough guns to shoot all of us?". Finding there no other policemen free to assist the officers, Bouchard had Big Bertha driven to the strippers' agency and personally entered the agency wearing his full dress uniform with his handgun drawn. Bouchard found four policemen in a tense stand-off with 15 Hells Angels. One of the larger Hells Angels approached Bouchard with his fists clenched for a fight, leading for Bouchard to say "You're kidding me" before he punched out the biker with a single blow. Bouchard shouted: "Anybody else want some?". Bouchard ordered the remaining bikers and the strippers to the floor. Found within the agency were $2.5 million worth of various drugs, 67 guns, and photographs of the bikers having sex with the strippers and each other. As a form of domination, "full patch" Hells Angels often sodomize "prospect" and "hang-around" Hells Angels.

One of those arrested was a Peruvian immigrant and drug dealer named Steve Bois. Bois told one of the arresting detectives, also an immigrant from Peru, Mike Vargas, that he knew who was the gunman who had killed the prison guards. Vargas burst into Bouchard's office to tell him that Bois knew who was the gunman who killed the prison guards. Bois named the gunman as Stéphane "Godasse" Gagné, a career criminal associated with the Hells Angels. Detective Robert Pigeon psychologically broke Gagné by showing him a video clip of Bois talking about helping Gagné clear up after the murders, causing Gagné to break down in tears and say he wanted a deal with the Crown to avoid spending the rest of his life in prison. Gagné named Boucher as the man who ordered the murders of the two prison guards.

On 27 November 1998, when the verdict in Boucher's trial on two counts of first-degree murder was due, Bouchard was ordered to the courthouse as the toughest policeman who knew to handle the Hells Angels should Boucher be convicted. A group of Hells Angels were in the corridor of the courthouse milling around and one of them took out a camera to start taking photographs of the policemen present. Bouchard told one of the lawyers for the Hells Angels to tell his client to stop taking pictures When the lawyer took no action, Bouchard shouted at him that he was going to arrest the Hells Angel on the spot. The lawyer then went over to his client and the Hells Angel stopped taking pictures. When the jury announced its verdict, Boucher was acquitted on all counts and was carried out of the courthouse on the shoulders of the other Hells Angels as a conquering hero. Bouchard felt very angry at the sight of Boucher being carried out in triumph. Commander Bouchard and a group of policemen retired to a bar on rue de St-Hubert, where he tried to console the other policemen by saying: "Hey guys, we did our job, we did our job!". Later that night, Bouchard, an avid boxing fan, went to the Molson Centre, to see the middleweight boxing match between Dave Hilton Jr. and Stéphane Ouellet. As he took his seat, he remembered: "We heard an uproar and as I turned to my left it was like Moses had parted the water, and who did we see coming through the crowd – Mom Boucher in full colours, escorted by his henchmen. What broke my heart was seeing hundreds of people actually give him a standing ovation as if he was a rock star".

In 1999, Boucher and other Hells Angels began to visit the Au Bon Café, which happened to be also be Bouchard's favorite café, as a way of annoying him. In this, Boucher was more than successful as Bouchard regarded the Au Bon Café as "his" own ground, and found the presence of Boucher and the other Hells Angels to be a provocation, all the more so as Boucher and his associates started to have meetings in the café. Bouchard wanted to plant bugs in the café to record Boucher's meetings, but was unable to do so as Boucher had his lawyers present at the meetings, thus technically making the meetings between a client and his lawyer, and to bug the meetings would violate solicitor–client privilege. Bouchard was angry about having Boucher plan crimes literally right in him and said: "Cause I'll tell you something. He wouldn't have done that twenty years ago. Twenty years ago we would have kicked the shit out of him right there in front of everybody. We have grabbed him; we would have ripped his fucking jacket off, put him on the floor. We would have thumped the son of a bitch. Because you do not intimidate a cop. You've got to show them, 'I'm not afraid of you, you prick!'" Bouchard wanted to beat up Boucher, but was told that the "old school" police methods that he started with were not longer acceptable. Instead, lengthy stare-downs ensured as Boucher and his Hells Angels sat at one table staring silently at Bouchard and his policemen at another table to see who would blink first.

On 26 April 2000, the loan shark André Desjardins was murdered in the parking lot of Shawn's, a restaurant where he was supposed to be meeting Boucher that day. Later on the same day, Bouchard confronted Boucher at the Au Bon Café to ask him what he knew about the murder of Desjardins and to arrest him. Boucher refused to speak unless his lawyer was present, and on the same afternoon, finally gave a statement to Bouchard at the police headquarters in the presence of his lawyer, Gilbert Frigon. Boucher denied knowing anything about the murder and with a notable lack of emotion said it "a sad thing" his friend Desjardins had just been shot down and "if I hear anything, I'll call you". By the year 2000, Bouchard felt increasing pressure from even people who knew only casually to take action against the Hells Angels.

In October 2000, the Crown Attorney France Charbonneau undid double jeopardy and won an appeal against Boucher's 1998 acquittal under the grounds that instructions that Justice Jean-Guy Boilard had given the jury were defective and biased towards the defense. Upon hearing the news, Bouchard immediately decided to arrest Boucher himself. However, the Sûreté du Québec wanted the honor of arresting Boucher, leading Bouchard to tell the police chief: "Fuck if you think the SQ is picking him up. My boys are picking him up. Those sons of bitches, they want to take him. We're taking him". The police chief told Bouchard: "You arrest him, but a deal with the SQ". Ultimately, Bouchard reached a compromise that the SPVM and the SQ would jointly arrest Boucher, but that the SQ would take him to their Montreal office at Parthenais in exchange for Bouchard to be the one to apply handcuffs to Boucher. Bouchard arrested Boucher as he was leaving a restaurant, and Bouchard recalled: "He was pissed off".

Despite his fondness for "old school" policing, Bouchard played a major role in helping the Montreal police adopt modern scientific methods, most notably in pressuring the city to pay for a DNA lab. Bouchard had assigned two detectives, Louis-Marc Pelletier and Michel Tremblay, to see if it was possible to match a list of suspects in various murders provided by the informer Dany Kane with DNA evidence. The detectives collected DNA from the Hells Angels by seizing items left in public such as discarded cigarettes and used plastic coffee cups and then sought to match the DNA samples with DNA found on crime scenes. By February 2001, Bouchard's Major Crimes Unit had enough evidence to charge 42 Hells Angels with some 23 counts of first-degree murder.

On 26 March 2001, Bouchard planned out the arrests for Operation Springtime, which was scheduled for 28 March 2001. Bouchard recalled "it was unbelievable". At 4:30 am on 28 March, Bouchard arrived at the police headquarters at Place Versailles to organise the Operation Springtime raids and first informed his officers, who had been kept uninformed until them to prevent leaks. He also assembled the canine unit to assemble seven dogs to search for dogs while ordering the policemen to kill any guard dogs at the homes and offices of the Hells Angels. By the end of the day, the Montreal police had arrested 128 people, mostly members of the Hells Angels and their puppet club, the Rockers. Bouchard took charge of the interrogations and remembered feeling amused as various Hell Angels such as René Charlebois broke down in tears at the prospect of life imprisonment. When Charlebois spoke of his wish to cut a deal with the Crown, Bouchard told him "fuck you, no deal for you", which caused Charlebois to cry even more. Bouchard thought that the first one arrested to make a deal would be Gregory Woolley, the Haitian immigrant who served as the president of the Rockers and as a black man was not allowed to join the Hells Angels proper. Bouchard said of Woolley: "He was the only one really who never said a word". Bouchard noted that the Hells Angels and Rockers arrested insisted on smoking cigarettes and drinking from Styrofoam cups, which they discarded, allowing the police to seize the items to search for DNA samples. One Hells Angel told Bouchard: "If you think you can get my fucking DNA, you're a bunch of assholes!" as he threw away a Kleenex that he had used to wipe away his tears. Bouchard laughingly said: "You look at these guys. They're not all the sharpest pencils".

When Boucher was convicted of two counts of first-degree murder at his second trial on 6 May 2002, Commander Bouchard was playing golf when he heard the news. He remembered feeling very relieved that Boucher was sentenced to life imprisonment and resumed his game of golf.

== Retirement ==
Bouchard retired from the Montreal police in 2004. In 2008, he was able to handle an armed man who had appeared at his home apparently with the intention of killing him.

In 2017, when it was revealed the Montreal police and the SQ had been tapping the phones of various journalists, Bouchard was highly critical, saying he always maintained a good relationship with journalists. Bouchard believes the spying on the journalists was politically motivated, saying: "The police chief is always in the mayor's office. You got a mayor who doesn't like something he saw on TV, and he tells the chief of police, 'I wanna know what the fuck and how come they found out about this before it come out,' and this and that". Bouchard expresses much appreciation for the media, saying: "I think it's a great thing that the newspaper guys... force the police officers to be good police officers."

== Books ==
- O'Connor, D'Arcy (2011). Montreal's Irish Mafia: The True Story of the Infamous West End Gang. John Wiley & Sons. ISBN 9780470676158.
- Langton, Jerry (2006). Fallen Angel: The Unlikely Rise of Walter Stadnick and the Canadian Hells Angels. Toronto: Harper Collins. ISBN 144342725X.
- Martin, Danille (2002). "Both Pitied and Scorned: Child Prostitution in an Era of Privization". In Brenda Cossman, Judy Fudge (ed.). Privatization, Law, and the Challenge to Feminism. Toronto: University of Toronto Press. pp. 355–402. ISBN 9780802085092.
- Sher, Julian; Marsden, William (2003). The Road to Hell: How the Biker Gangs are Conquering Canada. A.A. Knopf Canada. ISBN 9780676975987.
- Sher, Julian; Marsden, William (2006). Angels of Death: Inside the Bikers' Empire of Crime. Toronto: Alfred Knopf Canada. ISBN 9780307370327.
