= Commission des services juridiques =

The Commission des services juridiques (French pronunciation: [kɔmisjɔ̃ de sɛʁvis ʒyʁidik], Quebec Legal Services Commission) is a government organization in the Canadian province of Quebec. Established with the passage of Quebec's Legal Aid Act 1972, it is responsible for ensuring that legal aid is provided to all who apply for it and are financially eligible.

In 1986, the commission argued that it was unconstitutional for the provincial government to oversee home inspections of social assistance recipients.
