= Stéphane Gagné =

Canadian outlaw biker and gangster

- Born: 12 December 1969 (age 56); Montreal, Quebec, Canada
- Other name: "Godasse"
- Occupations: Outlaw biker, gangster, contract killer
- Known for: Hitman for the Hells Angels who turned Crown's evidence
- Allegiance: Hells Angels MC/Rockers MC
- Conviction: First-degree murder (1997)
- Penalty: 25 years' imprisonment (1997)

Stéphane Gagné (born 12 December 1969) is a Canadian former gangster, outlaw biker and contract killer who was a hitman for the Hells Angels Motorcycle Club during the Quebec Biker War. Charged with two counts of first-degree murder, Gagné turned Crown witness against the Hells Angels in 1997 in exchange for one murder charge against him being dismissed. He was sentenced to 25 years' imprisonment. Gagné's testimony resulted in Hells Angels leader Maurice "Mom" Boucher being imprisoned for murder in 2002.

== Early life ==
Gagné was born into a working-class French-Canadian family in the Hochelaga-Maisonneuve district of Montreal. His father worked as a professional wrestler, and his mother was a housewife. His uncle was a hitman for the Dubois brothers and was murdered in 1974. Paul Cherry, the crime correspondent of The Montreal Gazette, wrote that Gagné speaks his joual (nonstandard Quebec French) with a strong working-class accent with a distinctive nasal tone. Cherry noted that Gagné usually has a "goofy grin" on his face, which gives the impression that his intelligence is very low.

As a child, Gagné suffered from learning disabilities, especially from attention-deficit disorder, and was much bullied by the other children. Gagné dropped out of school in grade 7 to work as a drug dealer and as a thief. A self-confessed drug addict, Gagné was as a teenager "quasiment gelé" ("almost frozen"), as he phrased it, by usually being high on hashish and PCPs. Besides selling drugs, Gagné stole automobiles and robbed homes and businesses. He amassed a criminal record, being convicted nine times over 12 years for automobile theft, home invasions, drug trafficking, and probation violations. Gagné told the National Parole Board in 2016 that he wanted to become a gangster to bring "beautiful women and money." By the age of 24, Gagné had made enough money to purchase a house with his wife, Marie-Claude Nantais, who was also involved in his drug-dealing business. He fathered a son, whom he named Harley-David, after his motorcycle. Alongside his partner, Tony Jalbert, Gagné operated a string of crack houses and shooting galleries for cocaine and heroin addicts.

Gagné's nickname of Godasse (Old Shoe) came from his reputation for brutality, as he would beat up people and kick them in the head, usually while he wore his old shoes. He testified in court that he had once savagely beat a prostitute because she had stolen from a drug dealer working for him. Gagné stated he felt no shame in beating up a woman because, as he put it, "if you let that kind of thing go, all of the druggie girls are going to steal from you." He was successful in his business and made $6,000 in cash per week and about $250,000 per year. Gagné also engaged in welfare fraud. as he claimed to be unemployed, which allowed him to collect welfare. He often used the "stupidity defence" at his trials by claiming that his IQ is so low that he could not be held legally responsible for his crimes, which that the courts have consistently rejected. Gagné has admitted that he is not as asinine as he claimed to be and says that he acted like a mentally-challenged person in the hope of avoiding prison time.

== Hells Angels ==
In July 1994, Gagné was ordered by the Hells Angel, Paul "Fonfon" Fontaine, to close his shooting galleries for heroin addicts, which were competing with the shooting galleries owned by the Hells Angels. Desperate to stay in business, Gagné met with Maurice "Mom" Boucher on Sherbrooke Street. Using a type of sign language used in the Montreal undeworld, Gagné pointed to his nose (meaning that he wanted to buy cocaine) and then touched Boucher's arm (meaning that he wanted to buy cocaine from the Hells Angels). Boucher pointed to Fontaine, which indicated that he was buy the cocaine from him. Gagné was very attracted to joining the Hells Angels, which he believed would make him into a powerful man. By contrast, Gagné's business partner, Jalbert, broke with him and joined the Rock Machine. Gagné sold an average of three kilograms of cocaine per month for the Hells Angels. Gagné usually paid about $34,000 in cash while the rest of the cocaine he took on was sur la bras (on credit). At Boucher's trial in 1998, Gagné testified, "I'm not stupid. I knew that the Hells would win the war. They're rich, better organized and certainly more disciplined."

In the fall of 1994, Gagné was sent to prison after selling cocaine to an undercover Sûreté du Québec officer, Robert Pigeon. In December 1994, while serving his sentence at Bordeaux Prison, Gagné was confronted by a member of the Rock Machine, Jean Duquaire, who demanded him to stomp on a photograph of Boucher and declare his allegiance to the Rock Machine. When he refused, he was beaten by Duquaire. After recovering, Gagné attacked Duquaire with a metal bar and beat him until he bled. Gagné testified about life in the underworld: "In this environment, there's only rule: win." Gagné was sent to another prison in Sorel, where he met up with Boucher, who was serving six months for violating a weapons ban after the police discovered a gun on him. Boucher was so pleased by the beating that he ordered his son Francis to make weekly cash payments to Gagné's wife to support her while Gagné was in prison. Boucher and Gagné became close and were often seen talking in the prison courtyard. As a prisoner, Gagné invented what he called the pen-merde ("shit-pen"), a mixture of his own excrement and urine that he would keep in an empty shampoo bottle for ten days and then use to soak the guards with.

In July 1995, Boucher was released, followed by Gagné in April 1996. On his first day of freedom, Gagné contacted Francis Boucher to ask for a meeting with his father. On the second day, Gagné had lunch with Maurice Boucher. Gagné was told, "I've got important work for you. I want you to stick around." He later testified, "It was there that Maurice Boucher said that he had big things for me. And he didn't say much more than that." Gagné discovered that Boucher had a disconcerting habit of suddenly appearing and expecting Gagné to drop everything to carry out his latest project. Gagné took Boucher on a trip through Verdun, where Boucher ordered him to drive and park a car packed with a powerful bomb to explode outside of a Rock Machine clubhouse. After setting off the bomb, the Hells Angels planned to storm the clubhouse and gun down everyone inside. Gagné was trained in how to set off a remote-controlled bomb.

The police informer Dany Kane alerted the police to the planned attack. which never happened as there was always a police car near the clubhouse. One evening in the summer of 1996, Gagné was supposed to drive a stolen automobile packed with a bomb to the clubhouse, but the attack was cancelled when the Hells Angels noted there was a police cruiser waiting for them. In another attempt to bomb the clubhouse, Gagné stole a van that was painted the same shade of grey as Hydro-Québec vans. On 23 August 1996, the police seized the van that Gagné had parked outside the clubhouse; it had 200 pounds of dynamite fashioned into a remote-controlled bomb. Gagné joined the Rockers, the Hells Angels puppet club that Boucher had founded in March 1992. The Rockers were divided into a "baseball team," which beat people up and destroyed property, and a "football team," which functioned as a death squad. Gagné joined the latter. Gagné testified, "The football team is a team of killers." Gagné remembered how Pierre Provencher, a Rocker, told one drug dealer that he was to pay 10% of his profits to Gagné because "Godasse is going to open some doors." When the drug dealer expressed some confusion about that statement, Provencher stated that Gagné would kill any drug dealer not working for the Hells Angels. Gagné described the atmosphere in the Rockers as one of relentless paranoia, and members communicated via sign language or by writing on an erasable magnetic board of the fear of police wiretaps.

In February and March 1997, instead of working on the "football team," Gagné was assigned to the Gay Village project under Serge Boutin, an attempt to take over all drug dealing in Montreal's Gay Village. Gagné reported that the majority of his clients in the Gay Village were male prostitutes who turned to prostitution only to support their drug addictions. In March 1997, Gagné, together with a Peruvian immigrant, Steve Boies, kidnapped a rival drug dealer, Christian Bellemare, and took him out to a chalet in the Laurentians. As Bellemare begged for his life, Boies shot him while Gagné's gun jammed. Together, Boies and Gagné shot Bellemare three times. Gagné strangled Bellemare and then buried him in the snow. However, Bellemare was not dead and climbed out of the snow, which caused Gagné to go into hiding for the next month. Despite botching his first murder attempt, Gagné became a "hang-around" member of the Rockers in May 1997.

Gagné served as a drug dealer and bodyguard for the Hells Angels. At restaurants, he always monitored people coming out of washrooms, where weapons might be hidden. That made Gagné state, "If the guy returned and put his fingerprints everywhere, that's not a killer, that guy because a killer would not put his fingerprints everywhere." Gagné found that the Hells Angels had their own intelligence unit with three vehicles, which were equipped with hidden cameras powered by batteries that lasted for 72 hours. To create a cover, Gagné testified that the Hells Angels printed their surveillance vehicles with the lettering of a fake construction contractor and even created a cell phone number for the fake company to give the impression that the vehicles were parked in the same spot for so long because a construction contractor was at work. Gagné would park one of the three vehicles and pick it up the next day. When the mother of the gangster Frank Cotroni died, Boucher had Gagné park the automobiles with hidden cameras in the parking lot of the church in which the service was held since Boucher wanted footage of everyone who attended the funeral and the license plates of their cars as he was planning to liquidate the Cotroni family. One policeman stated, "When the Hells went on a biker rally and stopped for a rest, Gagné would jump off his Harley and starting polishing the Hells' machine. He'd make sure the refrigerator was stocked with beer at biker parties and brought them drinks." Gagné was also involved in the escape of Richard Vallée in June 1997.

=== Murders ===
Boucher knew from corrupt policemen that there was an informer in the ranks of the Hells Angels but did not know his name. To flush out the "mole," Boucher wanted the Hells Angels to start murdering people associated with the justice system. Boucher ordered two Hells Angels, André "Toots" Tousignant and Paul "Fonfon" Fontaine, to kill some random prison guards, and the two men recruited Gagné in turn. Together with Tousignant, Gagné waited outside Rivière-des-Prairies Prison in the eastern end of Montreal, waiting for an auspicious moment to strike. However, it was decided to murder prison guards from Bordeaux Prison instead, as it was closer to the major highways, which made escaping easier.

On 26 June 1997, Gagné and Tousigant armed themselves with handguns and got on two stolen '81 Suzuki Katana motorcycles. As the prison guard Diane Lavigne was leaving work in her minivan at Bordeaux Prison shortly after 9:48 pm, Gagné and Tousigant followed her. The two men rode up next to her minivan and opened fire, putting one bullet through Lavigne's arm and another into her lung, the latter of which proved to be fatal. Both men abandoned their guns at the crime scene. After the killing, Lavinge, Tousigant and Gagné returned to the garage, changed their clothes, and went out to the woods to burn the clothing and biker helmets that they had worn when they killed Lavigne.

The next day, Gagné went for a walk down Saint Catherine Street with Boucher, Fonatine, and Gilles "Trooper" Mathieu. Boucher told Gagné about the murder of Lavigne: "That's great, my Godasse. It's not serious that she had tits." Mathieu agreed with Boucher's statement that there was no dishonour in killing a woman: "That's great, Godasse!" Gagné by his own admission was proud to have killed Lavigne as he remembered he felt was he would soon be promoted up to join the Hells Angels proper. Gagné told the National Parole Board in 2016 about his thinking about having killed a woman: "It was a power trip . I wanted my patches, I adhered to the values [of the Hells Angels]. I had lost sight of my parents' values." On the day after Lavigne was killed, Gagné's wife was watching the television news and stated it must had been a "sick person" who had killed her, a statement made that her husband leave the room in his shame. Shortly after the murder, a member of the Rock Machine used his car to run over Gagné while he was riding his motorcycle, an incident that put Gagné into a hospital for a month. While in the hospital, Gagné was promoted to being a prospect with the Rockers. On 21 August 1997, Gagné received his half-patch Rockers jacket.

Boucher now wanted Fontaine to kill a prison guard to prove that he was not an informer, and once again, Gagné was asked to help. This time, Gagné felt more confident about having a good escape route from Rivière-des-Prairies Prison. Gagné reported that Fontaine was desperate to be promoted to being a "full patch" Hells Angel and attended a meeting, along with Boucher, Normand "Biff" Hamel, Gilles Mathieu, and Normand Robitalle, to ask for permission to kill a prison guard. At about 6:15 am, Fontaine and Gagné were waiting in a van outside of Rivière-des-Praires Prison for the prison bus to arrive. As the prison bus, driven by Pierre Rondeau and Robert Corriveau, arrived to pick up prisoners who were due in court that day, Fontaine and Gagné opened fire with 9 mm semi-automatic handguns. While Gagné was shooting at the van from the side, Fontaine leaped forward and rolled himself onto the hood of the van to open fire at point-blank range into the front window. Fontaine pumped three bullets into Rondeau that struck him in the heart, lungs, and liver, and Gagné shot and wounded Corriveau. One of the bullets in Rondeau came from Gagné's gun, but the fatal shot through the heart came from Fontaine's gun.

Both Gagné and Fontaine fled in their van, which they parked at a preselected place. Gagné set the van on fire and accidentally seared his face with the heat from the flames. However, he closed the doors to the burning van, which cut off the oxygen to the fire and made it die out. They left the murder weapons, which were abandoned inside intact. As Gagné got into the getaway car, a sales clerk, Nancy Dubé, waiting in a bus stop, got a good look at his face. Dubé gave the detectives from the Service de police de la Ville de Montréal a detailed enough description that the police issued a composite sketch that closely resembled Gagné. Upon arriving at the garage, Boies assisted Gagné by burning his clothes and driving the getaway car to a junk yard to be crushed. After the murder, Gagné wanted to go to sleep but instead had to buy several boxes of bolts at a Réno-Dépôt store to assist Tousignant with a bomb he was building to kill some Rock Machine members.

To reward him, Boucher paid for Gagné and his family to take a vacation in the Dominican Republic. After Rondeau's murder, Boucher asked Fontaine and Gagné, "Does anybody else know about this?" Gagné was about to say that Boies had assisted him with cleaning up, but Fontaine spoke first: "No. Nobody else knows." Gagné was greatly worried about Fontaine's statement, as he knew that Boucher always assumed the worst when people lied to him and that he would have Gagné killed if he learned Boies had been involved in the clean-up. Gagné admitted to Tousignant that he had lied to Boucher and he was told: "If you lie to the guys, you're going to be killed. You can't lie to the guys. You can lie to the police, but among the bikers you can't lie."

In October 1997, Serge Boutin, Fontaine's boyfriend, reported that he heard rumours that the guards in Bordeaux prison were accusing Gagné of being involved in the Lavigne and the Rondeau murders. Boucher demanded a meeting and asked Gagné, "Do you know that there are guys at Bordeaux prison, people who are our allies, who say that when they go through the classification in the prison the guards ask them if they know Godasse. When they say yes, the guards say, 'You know that Godasse killed the prison guards?'" However, Boucher concluded, "It's because you're so irritating when you're in prison. That must be why the guards think it's you."

=== Arrest ===
On 4 December 1997, a police raid, led by Commander André Bouchard, at a strippers' agency run by the Hells Angels seized some $2.5 million in drugs and 67 guns. One of those arrested in the raid was Boies. Detective Mike Vargas, an immigrant from Peru, was approached by Boies in the police station. Boies was afraid of being deported to Peru and wanted to cut a deal with the Crown. Vargas burst into Bouchard's office to tell him that Boies was willing to testify that Gagné was one of the killers.

Gagné, unaware that Boies had been arrested, spent the next day working as a bodyguard at Boucher's farm in Contrecoeur, outside Montreal. Upon learning from Boucher's lawyer, Robert Cliche, that Boies was under arrest, Gagné tried to flee to a motel in Saint-Ignace, but was arrested by the police along the way at about 11 pm. At about 2:40 am, Sergeant Detective Robert Pigeon started the interrogation of Gagné. Pigeon was chosen because he had arrested Gagné in 1994 and was the policeman who knew him the best. The journalists Julian Sher and William Marsden wrote: "Detective Sergeant Pigeon is a hard guy to read. He is of medium height and build. His face is round. His eyes are brown and watchful. His voice is soft, but steady. He has an aura of intensity, but at the same time seems to lack all flair or style. Which is probably why he's good at what he does. There's nothing distracting about his physical presence. You tend to listen to him, not see him. And what you hear is the voice that explains your life to you, lays out the choices and then quietly leads you to the right one, making you think you're the one who made that choice. That you're still in control."

Gagné was uncooperative, saying he had nothing to say to Pigeon and swore at him a number of times. Pigeon felt that he understood Gagné's psychology very well: Gagné was a weak man of low intelligence, whose self-esteem was based entirely on his association with the Hells Angels. Pigeon chose to take advantage of that weaknesses. Over the course of a lengthy interrogation, which lasted several hours, Pigeon proceeded to psychologically deconstruct Gagné as he relentlessly challenged him on his life choices and pointed out that the Hells Angels were just using him. Pigeon performed a "good cop/bad cop routine," as he was alternatively sympathetic and unsympathetic towards Gagné. He posed both as a potential friend, who was willing to help him avoid going to prison for the rest of his life, and as a tormentor, who mercilessly mocked Gagné as a loser who was too dimwitted to realize that he was being used by the Hells Angels. Pigeon at times spoke in a friendly tone about Gagné's family and motorcycle and said that he knew that Gagné was a good father and husband, who greatly loved his wife, children, and motorcycles. Pigeon was well aware that being too confrontational would strengthen Gagné's resolve and that he needed to be seen as a potential friend.

Pigeon noted to Gagné that several other Rockers who had killed for the Hells Angels had in turn been killed by the Angels once they ceased to be useful. Pigeon asked Gagné what made him think that he could avoid the same fate. Pigeon pointed out the absurdity of murdering people at random just out of the hope of being allowed to wear the Hells Angels death's head patch on his biker's vest and noted that almost everybody else in the world did not need to wear the Hells Angel patch on their backs to feel happy. Gagné was arrogant as he told Pigeon in a cocky tone, "I can guarantee you that I won't make the decision you want me to make. You can take that to the bank." At about 5:31 am, Pigeon told Gagné that he was under arrest for two counts of first-degree murder. Using the information gained from Boies, Pigeon informed Gagné that the Crown had a solid case against him and that he had no hope of an acquittal, as Boies had told all during his confession. Pigeon told Gagné, "I also arrest you for the murder of the prison guard Diane Lavigne. That's serious, that! You know how serious! But it's over. We have the whole chain, every single link. I know where you parked the little van. I can even tell you that when you first set fire to the van you scorched yourself a little. You went to the Dominican Republic with Marie-Claude to let the heat die down. Why? Because you wanted to become a Hells Angel!" Pigeon was bluffing, as only 25% of what Boies had said in his confession was true, and the other 75% was lies, as Boies was desperate to avoid being deported to Peru. However, Pigeon gambled that the sheer psychological impact of learning that Boies had turned Crown's evidence would shatter Gagné's resolve. Pigeon also told Gagné that his wife had been arrested as an accessory to murder and that she was also be going to prison, and their son would be placed in foster care.

Changing his approach, Pigeon savagely mocked Gagné as a coward for killing an unarmed woman in cold blood and told him that the exaggerated machismo of the outlaw biker subculture was only a psychological defence mechanism for weak, insecure men like himself. Pigeon kept taunting Gagné over his sense of masculinity and told him to "be a man" and to confess. Pigeon told him, "Why did you choose Diane Lavigne? Why did you choose that poor woman? Killing prison guards, what were you thinking when you did that? Be enough of a man at least to answer me today!" Gagné kept mumbling in response, "I have nothing to say." Confronting Gagné head-on, Pigeon told him that he had murdered two people all because he wanted to wear the Hells Angels death head patch on his back, asking him was it really worth it given that he was going to prison for the rest of his life if he did not make a plea bargain immediately. Piegon told him that he was being used: "They made sure you were covered in blood. They injected you with it." Gagné screamed, "I have nothing to say, I have nothing to say, I have nothing to say! And I want my lawyer and I want you to put me the fuck in my cell!" Pigeon told him, "Yahoo! I killed the prison guard. Yahoo! Me, Stéphane Gagné, I wanted a Hells Angels patch, and I want went as far as killing prison guards to get it. And if you think you're going to get out of here in two years, forget that, Stéphane, my boy. It's all over for you."

Gagné broke down hysterically in tears, but Pigeon was relentless in his verbal assault and told him that the Angels had abandoned Gagné as he reminded him that was just a barely-literate grade 7 drop-out, who could not even speak proper French and about whom nobody outside of his family cared. Gagné was allowed to phone Cliche, left a message on his answering machine, and was taken back to the interrogation room. The news that Boies had turned Crown's evidence would ensure that Boucher would learn that Gagné had lied to him, and he become convinced that Boucher would have him killed. The fact that the lawyers for the Hells Angles such as Cliche were refusing to go to the police station because it was very late in the night made Pigeon's statements about his abandonment seem believable to Gagné.

At about 6:30 am, Gagné finally collapsed and, amid his tears, asked Pigeon, "If I talk, how many years could I expect to get?" At about 7:30 am, Marie-Claude Nantais, who was charged with being an accessory to two counts of murder, arrived at the police station to tell her husband to make a deal with the Crown and said that she did not want to go to prison for his crimes, as she had been informed that the Crown was willing to drop the charges against her if her husband turned Crown's evidence. Gagné wanted to see the videotape of Boies's confession, which led Pigeon to play the tape on the police VHS machine. After he watched the first five minutes, Gagné said he wanted to become a délateur (informer). Starting at 8:10 am, Gagné gave a full confession of his crimes to Pigeon. After giving his confession, Gagné asked for police protection for his wife and his son and said that Boucher would have both of them killed if he learned that Gagné had become a délateur. In response, Pigeon told him that both his wife and his son would be placed under 24-hour police guard. Gagné testified at Boucher's trial in 1998, "I understood that if I went to prison, I was a dead man. They would have been afraid that I'd talk. Look at what happened to Toots and Paul. It wasn't easy. In a few seconds I had to confide to the police and the system I have hated since I was 15 years old."

Two weeks later, Gagné and his lawyer met with André Vincent, the chief Crown Attorney for Montreal, to negotiate the terms of his plea bargain. Gagné wanted full immunity and to be paid for testifying against Boucher, but Vincent refused both demands. In exchange for a plea bargain where Gagné was to serve 25 years in prison for Lavigne's murder, Vincent dropped the charge of first-degree murder in connection with Rondeau's slaying. If Gagné had been convicted of two counts of first-degree murder, he would have received a life sentence with no chance of parole, and Vincent told Gagné that dropping the charges for Rondeau's murder was a major concession on the part of the Crown. Vincent refused Gagné's demand to be paid $1 million for his testimony, as he stated that the Quebec people would never stand for a murderer be allowed to profit from his crimes at their expense. The only financial concession that Vincent made was that the Crown would pay $400 a week to assist Nantais with raising their son. Vincent informed Gagné that given the gravity of his crimes, Gagné was very lucky to receive a sentence of only 25 years in prison, and that Vincent was making the plea bargain only because he wanted to see Boucher convicted.

== Witness for the Crown ==
On the basis of Gagné's confession, Boucher was charged with two counts of first-degree murder on 18 December 1997. Before the trial started, a lawyer for the Hells Angels offered Gagné a $1 million bribe not to testify against Boucher. To further encourage Gagné not to testify against Boucher, the Hells Angels burned down the house of Gagné's parents. He was told that the next time the Hells Angels burned down his parents' house, they would be in it. On 19 March 1998, Gagné pledged guilty to one count of first-degree murder for the slaying of Diane Lavinge on 26 June 1997 and one count of attempted murder in regards to the shooting of Robert Corriveau on 8 September 1997. In exchange, the Crown dropped the charge of first-degree murder in connection with the slaying of Pierre Rondeau.

The Crown Attorney in charge of prosecuting Boucher, Jacques Dagenais, felt that Gagné was a terrible witness, an unsavory and unlikable hitman who spoke in a flat, cold nasal tone and turned Crown's evidence only for a lighter sentence. Going into the trial, Dagenais stated that he was facing an uphill battle, as Boucher had never actually said anything about murdering prison guards and instead expressed himself to Gagné via sign language, which made it difficult to prove that he indeed ordered the murders. Dagenais feared the unlikability of Gagné and his long criminal record would make it difficult for the jury to believe his testimony that Boucher had ordered him to commit murders by his hand gestures. Boucher's lawyer, Jacques Larochelle, was a well-respected defence lawyer who was noted for his ability to tear apart the credibility of the Crown's witnesses on the stand via a series of sharp, probing questions. Larochelle regarded Gagné as being the weakest link in the Crown's case against Boucher and planned to discredit him as a witness as the best way to secure the acquittal of his client.

The trial for Boucher on two counts of first-degree murder began in Montreal on 2 November 1998. During the trial, Larochelle brought up Gagné's long history of telling lies and of anti-social behavior, which he used to paint him as a dishonest sociopath who would tell any falsehood if it would serve his interests such as avoiding going to prison for the rest of his life. Larochelle used the pen-merde during the trial as an example of Gagné's anti-social tendencies. Larochelle argued that Gagné had an extreme hatred of prison guards as proven by the pen-merde and had murdered the two prison guards on his own initiative. Larochelle made much of the fact that Gagné had been convicted 11 times between 1990 and 1997 for various offenses and that his criminal record went back to the age of 13. Larochelle also made much of the fact that Gagné had frequently lied to the National Parole Board to gain early releases, which led Gagné to reply: "All criminals are bluffers. If we don't bluff, we're dead." During his cross-examination of Gagné, Larochelle got Gagné to admit under oath that he had "no respect for the truth," a damning statement that Larochelle used in his final address to the jury as evidence that Gagné had committed perjury to avoid a life prison sentence. Larochelle argued that Gagné had fabricated the claim that Boucher had ordered his crimes to avoid a life sentence. In response, Dagenais admitted that Gagné was an unsavory witness but argued that all of the evidence supported his testimony.

The judge overseeing the trial, Justice Jean-Guy Boilard, showed a strong bias for the defence and excluded much of the Crown's evidence such as the police recordings of Boucher's phone calls, which confirmed several points of Gagné's testimony and reduced much of the Crown's case down to Gagné. Boilard accused the police of illegally tapping Boucher's cell phone calls, which led him to exclude the phone calls as evidence despite the fact the police had a warrant. In his instructions to the jury, Boilard came very close to accusing Gagné of perjury and told the jury that it should not convict Boucher on the basis of a witness who had probably committed perjury. Dagenais felt that Boilard's jury instructions were so biased in favour of the defence that he filed for a mistrial. In particular, Dagenais noted that Boilard in his instructions had stated that the Crown's case rested entirely on Gagné's testimony, a statement that was false since the Crown had introduced other evidence and witnesses during the course of the trial, which he felt proved that Boilard was determined to see Boucher acquitted. On 27 November 1998, Boucher was acquitted. In a rare move, the Crown chose to challenge double jeopardy in an appeal, as it was stated that the trial had been marred by the extreme pro-defence bias of Boilard. Many newspapers in Quebec attacked the plea bargain the Crown made with Gagné and charged that a self-confessed hitman had just been given only 25 years in prisonm but Boucher had been acquitted. Gagné testified in 2015 that he felt badly about Boucher's acquittal: "It was he who had lots of people killed and it was me who was in the hole. Justice had not been served. I was disappointed because I owed at least that to the families of the victims."

On 10 October 2000, the Crown Attorney, France Charbonneau, undid double jeopardy in an appeal, and the Quebec Court of Appeal ordered a new trial under the grounds that Boucher's first trial had been so tainted by Justice Boilard's pro-defence bias that a new trial was required. The second trial began in Montreal on 26 March 2002. At the second trial, Charbonneau brought in new evidence that confirmed much of Gagné's testimony at the first trial such as phone calls and security camera footage that showed Gagné to be at the places and times that he had testified to having been. Charbonneau had the cell phone calls that Boilard had excluded as evidence at the first trial introduced as evidence in the second trial. Cherry described Gagné as a "much more polished witness" at the second trial in 2002 than he had been at the first trial in 1998. Charbonneau also bought the reports from the police informer Dany Kane that confirmed that Gagné had indeed been offered a $1 million bribe. During his cross-examination of Gagné, Larochelle, who again acted as Boucher's counsel, once again hammered Gagné by accusing him of perjury. When Gagné mentioned that he was tired when he gave his confession to Pigeon and failed to mention certain details, Larochelle mockingly declared, "I've seen the video and you don't look tired." Charbonneau, in response, showed the videotape of the confession in which Gagné was clearly exhausted, as he struggled to stay awake in his chair. Charbonneau used the videotape to put Larochelle on trial in a sense, as she presented him as a ruthless lawyer, who would tell the most outrageous lies to acquit his client. On 5 May 2002, the trial ended with Boucher being convicted of two counts of first-degree murder and one count of attempted murder.

In April 2004, the Crown's case against the Hells Angels national president Walter "Nurget" Stadnick and his deputy Donald "Pup" Stockford was badly weakened by the testimony of the Crown's star witness, Gagné. Instead of testifying against Stadnick and Stockford, Gagné went on an extended rant about how the Crown had, not in his opinion, honoured its agreement with him when he agreed to turn Crown's evidence in 1997, and he compained that he felt cheated. The attempts by the Crown Attorney Randall Richmond to have Gagné to testify about the matter at hand were completely unsuccessful. Gagné's lengthy rant on the stand about how badly he felt treated by the Crown and his unwillingness to testify in support of the Crown's thesis that he committed his murders on the orders of Stadnick and Stockford effectively derailed the Crown's case on the first-degree murder charges. The trial ended with Stadnick and Stockford convicted of conspiracy to commit murder and gangsterism but acquitted on the charges of first-degree murder. In 2009, Gagné served as the main witness for the Crown at Fontaine's trial for Rondeau's murder. Richmond, who prosecuted Fontaine at his trial in 2008 and 2009, praised Gagné: "He held his ground throughout." The trial ended with Fonatine being convicted of first-degree murder.

== In prison ==
During his prison sentence, Gagné had to be kept separate from the other prisoners, as the Hells Angels had placed a contract on his life. In 2006, Gagné suffered from cancer and had to receive chemotherapy. Gagné learned to meditate from a Buddhist monk and claimed now to repent for the crimes that he committed. He said that he had a spiritual awakening under the influence of Buddhism. Prison officials described Gagné as a much better man than when he started his sentence, and they said that his claims of repentance seem genuine. Gagné apologized to the daughters of Lavigne for having killed their mother. In 2010 and again in April 2016, Gagné was involved in two incidents that made the National Parole Board unwilling to grant him parole. In 2015, Gagné testified that his son had told him, "Dad, I'm ashamed of you but I love you the same.' It broke my heart."

In December 2016, Gagné told the National Parole Board, "Connaissez-vous la blague des motards? C'est deux Hells Angels qui vont dans le bois. L'un dit : 'Il fait noir et j'ai peur.' L'autre répond : 'Je vais avoir encore plus peur quand je vais repartir tout seul." ("Do you know the biker joke? It's two Hells Angels going into the woods. One says, 'It's dark and I'm scared.' The other responds, 'I'm going to be even more afraid when I go back alone.') Gagné used the joke to illustrate the amorality of the Hells Angels as he stated that the much vaulted biker "brotherhood" does not exist and that the Angels will turn on each on other without guilt once it profits them to do so. In the 2017 Quebec television series Délateurs ("Informers"), Gagné was played by the actor Maxime Denommée.

On 18 October 2018, Gagné was granted day parole. During his outings from prison, Gagné was, according to the National Parole Board, "able to interact with citizens, learn to pay with bank cards, shop and eat in a restaurant." As a prisoner, Gagné worked in the prison kitchen. In February 2023, the National Parole Board granted Gagné permission to live in a half-way house as a prelude to his release from prison. The National Parole Board wrote: "At the hearing, you mentioned understanding the damage you caused to the victims and collateral victims. You say you have a thought for them every morning. You say that you will never forgive yourself for the irreparable actions you have committed, but that you must learn to live with them."

== Books ==
- Auger, Michel; Edwards, Peter (2012). The Encyclopedia of Canadian Organized Crime: From Captain Kidd to Mom Boucher. Toronto: McClelland & Stewart. ISBN 978-0771030499.
- Cherry, Paul (2006). The Biker Trials: Bringing Down the Hells Angels. Toronto: ECW Press. ISBN 978-1550226386.
- Lavigne, Yves (1999). Hells Angels at War. Toronto: HarperCollins. ISBN 9780002000246.
- Sher, Julian; Marsden, William (2003). The Road To Hell How the Biker Gangs Are Conquering Canada. Toronto: Alfred Knopf. ISBN 0-676-97598-4.
