= Robert Cliche =

Canadian lawyer, politician and judge

Leader of the New Democratic Party of Quebec
- In office 1965–1968
- Preceded by: Position established
- Succeeded by: Roland Morin

Quebec Lieutenant of the New Democratic Party
- In office 1964–1968
- Preceded by: Gérard Picard
- Succeeded by: Claude Rompré

Personal details
- Born: April 12, 1921 Saint-Joseph-de-Beauce, Quebec
- Died: September 15, 1978 (aged 57) Quebec City, Quebec
- Party: New Democratic Party
- Spouse: Madeleine Ferron
- Children: David Cliche
- Education: Université Laval

Military service
- Allegiance: United Kingdom
- Branch/service: Royal Marines
- Years of service: 1944–1946
- Battles/wars: World War II

Robert Cliche (12 April 1921 – 15 September 1978) was a Canadian lawyer, politician and judge.

== Biography ==
Born and raised in Saint-Joseph-de-Beauce, in the Beauce region of Quebec, Robert Cliche studied law at Laval University from 1941 to 1944. After graduation, during World War II, he joined the Royal Marines as a sailor and left as an officer in 1946. In 1946, he established a general law practice in Saint-Joseph-de-Beauce.

In politics, Cliche publicly supported the Liberal Party until 1960. In the early 1960s, he joined the New Democratic Party. In September 1963, he became the associate president of the federal NDP, then under the leadership of Tommy Douglas. In March 1965, Cliche was elected leader of the New Democratic Party of Quebec. Cliche was the NDP candidate in the riding of Beauce in the 1965 federal election and he obtained 29.44% of the vote. He was the NDP candidate in the riding of Duvernay in the 1968 federal election and he obtained 43.85% of the vote. The party was not successful in electing candidates from Quebec to the House of Commons of Canada. In 1968, Cliche left the leadership of the NDPQ and the associate presidency of the NDP and returned to law practice.

On 27 July 1972, minister of Justice Jérôme Choquette announced the nomination of Cliche as judge and assistant chief justice to the Provincial Court. Cliche officially became judge on 5 September 1972. In 1974 and 1975, he chaired the Royal Commission investigating the exercise of trade-union freedom in Quebec's construction industry. The two other members of the Commission were Brian Mulroney and Guy Chevrette.

He was married to journalist and novelist Madeleine Ferron from 1945 until his death. Their son David Cliche later served in the National Assembly of Quebec as a Parti Québécois MNA.

With his wife, he published Quand le peuple fait la loi (1972) and Les Beaucerons ces insoumis (1974).

He died in Quebec City in 1978 at the age of 57. He was named to the Order of La Pléiade later that same year.

The Robert-Cliche Regional County Municipality was named in his memory, as well as Autoroute 73 south of Quebec City. The literary prize Prix Robert-Cliche was also named in his honour.
