= Quebec Biker War =

Gang war in Quebec between the Rock Machine and the Hells Angels

- Part of organized crime in Canada and aftermath of FLQ insurgency
- Date: 1994–2002
- Location: Greater Montreal, Quebec, Canada
- Caused by: Drug trade criminal disputes
- Result: Hells Angels victory: Alliance decimated; Defection of Rock Machine members to the Hells Angels; The Rock Machine merges with the Bandidos in 2001; Hostilities end due to police crackdown in 2002; The Bandidos cede Quebec to the Hells Angels in 2003

Parties
Hells Angels MC: Death Riders MC; Demon Keepers MC; Evil Ones MC; Jokers MC; Rockers MC; Rowdy Crew; Support: Rizzuto crime family	The Alliance: Rock Machine MC (until 2001); Palmers MC; Bandidos MC; Dark Circle; Pelletier Clan; Local drug dealers	Quebec government: Sûreté du Québec; Montreal Police Service; Royal Canadian Mounted Police; Ontario Provincial Police

Lead figures
Maurice Boucher: Normand Hamel †; Michel Langlois; Nicolò Rizzuto; Vito Rizzuto; André Desjardins †	Giovanni Cazzetta: Claude Vézina; Fred Faucher; Johnny Plescio †; Sylvain Pelletier †; Harold Pelletier; Michel Duclos	Jacques Parizeau (1994–1996); Lucien Bouchard (1996–2001); Bernard Landry (2001–2002)

Casualties
- Deaths: 162
- Injuries: 180+
- Detained: 100+

The Quebec Biker War (French: Guerre des motards au Québec) was a gang war in Montreal, Quebec, Canada, lasting from 1994 to 2002, between the Quebec branch of the Hells Angels and the Rock Machine. The war left 162 people dead, including civilians. There were also 84 bombings and 130 cases of arson.

The conflict began when the Hells' Angels issued an ultimatum to monopolize the Montreal drug market. Rock Machine rejected the ultimatum, leading to escalating violence and retaliation. The Hells' Angels consistently maintained the upper-hand during the conflict, being vastly wealthier and more organized. Rock Machine sought international help from The Bandidos and local drug dealers.

The Quebec government, Royal Canadian Mounted Police, and the federal government struggled to build a case to convict the lead figures of the war. The war came to end as the police managed to arrest gang members with new evidence in 2001, and with the murder conviction of Quebec Hells' Angel leader Maurice Boucher.

In March 2002, American journalist Julian Rubinstein wrote about the biker war: "Considering how little attention the story has attracted outside Canada, the toll is staggering: 162 dead, scores wounded. The victims include an 11-year-old boy killed by shrapnel from one of the more than 80 bombs bikers planted around the province. Even the New York Mafia in its heyday never produced such carnage, or so terrorized civilians."

== Background ==
The Hells Angels first entered Canada via a "patch over" of the Popeyes of Montreal on 5 December 1977, and subsequently established dominance in Quebec during the First Biker War, in which they vanquished the Outlaws from the province. However, the club was severely weakened by the Lennoxville massacre on 24 March 1985, when five members of the Angels' chapter in Laval were shot by their clubmates. As the Laval chapter of the Angels had been liquidated, the leaders of the Sorel chapter fled Canada upon learning that they were also targeted. In the aftermath of the massacre, Michel "Sky" Langois, the national president of the Canadian Hells Angels, fled to Morocco after a warrant was issued for his arrest on charges of first-degree murder. Afterward, the vacuum left by the Hells Angels was filled by a number of Montreal-based organized crime groups such as the Rock Machine, and it was not until the early 1990s that the Angels became a major force in Montreal organized crime again.

In the early 1980s, Maurice "Mom" Boucher and Salvatore Cazzetta were leaders of the white supremacist SS motorcycle gang, dominating organized crime in the Pointe-aux-Trembles district of Montreal. In 1986, following a prison sentence for sexually assaulting a 16-year-old girl, Boucher joined the Quebec branch of the Hells Angels, quickly rising to become the club's leader. Boucher, who became a fully patched Hells Angel on 1 May 1987, became president of the Sorel chapter later that year. One of Boucher's friends was Guy Lepage, a former Montreal police officer dismissed from the force for associating with Mafiosi, who became his main contact with the Mafia. Boucher's defection to the Hells Angels resulted in a rift with Cazzetta, who had sworn against working with the Angels over their involvement in the Lennoxville massacre the previous year. Cazzetta instead formed his own motorcycle club, the Rock Machine, with his brother Giovanni. Around this time, Quebec had earned a reputation as a hotbed of violence, and had become known within the biker world as the "Red Zone". The Italo-Canadian Cazzetta was not a member of the Mafia, but he did have a close relationship with the Montreal Mafia, and as a result of his Mafia ties, the Hells Angels were unwilling to challenge the Rock Machine as long as he was leader. Cazzetta has often been described as controlling all of the organized crime in Montreal that was not controlled by the Mafia in the late 1980s and early 1990s.

On 26 March 1992, as part of a push to recruit more members, the Hells Angels created a puppet club, the Rockers Motor Club. This was a common tactic on the part of the Angels to provide more manpower and a wider pool of followers willing to commit crimes in order to become Hells Angels. It is standard for members of a puppet club to commit most of the crimes in the hope that they will be promoted to the rank of "prospect" within the Hells Angels proper. A British policeman told journalist Patrick Lejtenyi about the use of puppet clubs by the Hells Angels: "However, the paranoia that new recruits might be infiltrators from law enforcement or even journalists causes much angst around their selection. To try and avoid this, potential members are treated like shit and asked to perform various tasks to prove their worth. These are often degrading or illegal, the rationale being that a UC [undercover] cop or similar wouldn't have the stomach for this or have the necessary authority to actually commit crimes. The downside of this is that the attrition rate is high ... However, those determined to wear the patch will ... do as they are ordered and that's what makes these gangs so dangerous."

The war began as the Hells Angels in Quebec began to make a push to establish a monopoly on street-level drug sales in the province in 1993. In Quebec, most of the illegal drugs were imported by the Mafia and distributed by the biker gangs to various street-level drug dealers. The journalist André Cédillot, an expert on biker gangs in Quebec, stated in an interview: "The Mafia were in charge of importation and the Hells Angels were the distributors. Internationally, the Mafia has a better reputation than Hells Angels because the Colombians don't trust the Hells Angels, but they do trust the Mafia." In Quebec, the power of the Mafia was limited by the fact it was only open to those who were Sicilians or of Sicilian descent. In contrast, the Quebec bikers were, and remain, mostly French-Canadian. When Cazzetta was arrested on charges on importing cocaine from the United States in 1994, the Angels saw an opportunity to challenge the Rock Machine. He spent 10 years in a U.S. prison for attempting to smuggle 200 kilograms of cocaine into Canada. Claude Vézina, who was president of the Rock Machine's Quebec City chapter at the time, became the club's new national president. Renaud Jomphe was made president of the Montreal chapter, while Marcel Demers became the president of the Quebec City chapter until eventually opening the Beauport chapter in late 1996. In the early 1990s, various independent gangs controlled drug sales territories in eastern and northern Montreal, including Saint Denis Street, as well as in Laval, Mascouche, Terrebonne, Saint-Sauveur, and Sainte-Adèle. A number of drug dealers and crime families, such as the Dark Circle, the Pelletier clan, the Rock Machine, the Palmers, and former members of the Devils Disciples, resisted the Hells Angels' attempts at monopolisation and established a coalition known as the "Alliance to fight the Angels". The subsequent guerre des motards resulted in the bombings of many establishments and murders on both sides. It claimed more than 160 lives, including Daniel Desrochers, an 11-year-old boy who was fatally injured by shrapnel as he was playing near a jeep that was blown up. Peter Edwards, the crime correspondent of The Toronto Star, wrote the Rock Machine "wasn't really a motorcycle club at all: members didn't have to own a bike to bike. What brothers Giovannia (Johnny) and Salvatore Cazzetta sought to create was a cohesive confederation of drug-dealing groups".

== 1994: The ultimatum and the beginning of conflict ==
The Hells Angels attempted to dislodge the Rock Machine and their allies from the Montreal drug market, and issued an ultimatum that anyone dealing drugs in the city would have to buy from them. Maurice Boucher organized puppet clubs to persuade Rock Machine-controlled bars and their resident drug dealers to surrender their illegal drug business. In response, the Rock Machine created the Palmers MC, a Rock Machine puppet club created to counter the Hells Angels and their Rockers and Death Riders puppet clubs. The Palmers had chapters in both Montreal and Quebec City, and were led and organized by Rock Machine members Jean "Le Francais" Duquaire and André "Dédé" Désormeaux. Désormeaux was a member of the Dark Circle and later joined the Rock Machine.

Rejecting the Angels' ultimatum, the Alliance launched a series of attacks against the Hells Angels beginning on 13 July 1994, when Death Riders member Pierre Daoust was shot dead by three Rock Machine associates while working in his motorcycle shop in Rivière-des-Prairies. The following day, Rockers member Normand "Norm" Robitaille survived a shooting in Montreal.

On 14 July, the Sûreté du Québec arrested five Rock Machine members, including Normand Baker, who were found in possession of firearms, explosives and detonators while en route to attack the South Shore clubhouse of the Evil Ones, a Hells Angels puppet club.

On 15 July 1994, senior Hells Angels from across Quebec were summoned by Boucher to an emergency meeting at a hotel in Longueuil to take a vote on whether or not they wanted to take part in biker war against the Alliance. According to Sherbrooke Hells Angel-turned-Crown witness Sylvain Boulanger, the Montreal, Trois-Rivières and Quebec City chapters – Michel Langlois and Maurice Boucher of the Montreal faction, and Quebec City chapter vice-president Marc "Tom" Pelletier in particular – were strongly in favour, while only the Sherbrooke chapter leaders were against retaliation against their rivals. Despite Sherbrooke's initial holdout, the chapter eventually relented in August 1994, providing the Hells Angels' leadership the unanimous vote required to go to war against the Alliance.

=== Assassination of Pelletier ===
On 19 October 1994, a local drug dealer, Maurice Lavoie, was gunned down in his car while his girlfriend was wounded. Lavoie had previously been buying his wares from the Pelletier Clan associated with the Rock Machine, but had recently switched to the Hells Angels, and as a result the Pelletier Clan hired a hitman named Patrick Call to kill Lavoie.

On 28 October 1994, Sylvain Pelletier, the leader of the Pelletier Clan, was killed by the Hells Angels.

=== The Alliance to Fight The Angels ===
After Pelletier was killed, the independent drug dealers of Montreal formed the "Alliance to Fight The Angels", headed by Sylvain's younger brother, Harold Pelletier.

The Pelletier Clan and the Rock Machine were the most visible parts of the Alliance to Fight The Angels, but its most influential part was the secretive Dark Circle, a group of Montreal businessmen who were secretly engaging in the drug trade. What the Dark Circle all had in common was that all of them owned bars and/or restaurants from which drugs were sold, and drug money laundered. It was agreed that the Pelletier Clan and the Rock Machine would provide the "muscle" while the Dark Circle would provide the financial backing. The Dark Circle's leadership was provided by a committee of five. The chairman was Michel Duclos, a Montreal schoolteacher who also owned a bar that was a front for laundering profits from the drug trade.

Harold Pelletier attempted to assassinate Boucher in November 1994. Martin Simard, a Pelletier Clan member, purchased stolen dynamite to fill a truck which was left near Boucher's favorite restaurant by the Alliance member Martin Pellerin. The plan was to set off the explosives by remote control when Boucher arrived, killing him and everybody else in the restaurant. A Montreal parking officer noticed the truck was parked illegally and had it towed, thus unknowingly foiling the plot.

On 4 November 1994, Rock Machine member Daniel Bertrand, was shot dead while drinking in a Montreal bar. On 4 December 1994, another Rock Machine member, Bruno Bandiera, was killed when his bomb he was transporting in his car exploded prematurely.

=== Dany Kane becomes an Interpol informant ===
In November 1994, a disgruntled member of the Rockers, Dany Kane, a protégé of senior Angels' leader David "Wolf" Carroll, contacted the Interpol office in Ottawa, saying he wanted to sell information to the police.

Carroll had founded the Angels' chapter in Halifax in 1984, and moved to Montreal in 1990 to assist the president of the Montreal chapter, Maurice Boucher, although his French was very limited. It is generally believed that Carroll was in Montreal to assist the planned expansion of the Angels into Ontario, since he, together with national president Wolodumir "Walter the Nurget" Stadnick and Donald "Pup" Stockford were the only Anglos in the Quebec Angels' leadership. Neither Stadnick nor Stockford spoke French, and police wiretaps showed that when the leaders of the Angels met, interpreters were needed for them to participate. Carroll had spent two years in a Quebec prison between 1985 and 1987 awaiting first-degree murder charges for his role in the Lennoxville massacre, during which he learned some French.

At the request of Carroll and Stadnick, Kane had founded a puppet club for the Angels in Toronto called the Demon Keepers Motorcycle Club. However, the Demon Keepers ended in fiasco, with the entire group being put behind bars by authorities without making a single drug sale and Kane sought revenge by working with the police.

Interpol put Kane into contact with Staff Sergeant Jean-Pierre Lévesque of the Royal Canadian Mounted Police (RCMP), who appointed Corporal Pierre Verdon of Montreal to be his handler. At their first meeting on 4 November 1994, Kane told Verdon that the leader of the Angels in Quebec was Maurice "Mom" Boucher, whom he described as a highly dangerous man who was feared by the other Angels, who was planning to murder anyone who might oppose him in his plans to take over the drug trade in Quebec. Kane also informed of Scott Steinert, an American Angel living in Montreal had gone on a dynamite buying spree, adding that both Boucher and Steinert were furious when they learned about the dynamite-packed truck left by the restaurant.

Some of the information sold by Kane to the RCMP was self-serving and incorrect, as he named another Angel as responsible for a murder that he himself had committed in 1995. However, Kane's information was mostly accurate and is the main source of information about the biker war from the Angels' perspective.

Kane was leading a double life in more than one sense, as the ostensibly straight Kane was having a secret relationship with another Rocker, Aimé Simard.

== 1995: Escalating violence and the Death of Desrochers ==
On 1 January 1995, Normand Baker, a Rock Machine member, was murdered while drinking in a Hard Rock Cafe in Acapulco by the Hells Angel François Hinse. Baker had been one of the killers of Daoust, and his murder while on vacation in Mexico was intended to send the message that no-one who crossed the Angels were safe anywhere. Hinse was arrested by the Mexican police, but freed after a Mexican judge was bribed with some 700,000 Canadian dollars to dismiss the murder charges.

=== Serge Quesnel ===
Serge Quesnel was a professional hit-man for the Trois-Rivières chapter of the Hells Angels. He had murdered a drug dealer named Richard Jobin on 9 September 1993 to give himself the underworld reputation as a killer. In October 1993, Quesnel murdered another independent drug dealer, Martin Naud, by ramming a pair of scissors through one of his eyes and then used the scissors to cut his throat.

In November 1994, Quesnel was permitted to join the Trois-Rivières chapter of the Hells Angels after the chapter president Louis "Mélou" Roy decided that he was the type of killer he wanted in his chapter. Roy told Quesnel he would be paid $500 per week and $10,000 every time he committed a murder, an offer that Quesnel promptly accepted.

On 30 January 1995, Jacques Ferland, a chemist who worked for the Rock Machine was murdered in Quebec City house by Quesnel .

On 27 February 1995, Claude Cossette, a Rock Machine member was shot dead as he was sitting in his van. Claude Rivard, a drug dealer for the Pelletier clan, was murdered while his car was stopped for a red light. Quesnel and Richard Vallée then engaged in a car chase followed by the Montreal police, but were able to escape on foot.

On 23 March 1995, Quesnel murdered an independent drug dealer associated to the Rock Machine, Richard Belcourt, by persuading him to visit Quebec City and shooting him in the head half-way along the journey after pulling over on a remote rural road.

Quesnel's career as a hitman was cut short when he was arrested on 1 April 1995, leading him to turn Crown's evidence in exchange for becoming eligible for parole after 12 years together with some $390,000 payment from the Crown. Roy was arrested and charged with murder, but acquitted in April 1997.

=== The Nomads ===
On 24 June 1995, Boucher founded the Nomads, an elite chapter of the Angels, that unlike the other chapters, had no geographical limit and were to operate all over Canada. To join the Nomads, applicants were required to commit murders, which ensured that no undercover police agents could enter the Nomads chapter. Additionally, only the highest-quality Angels who had proven themselves could join the Nomads.

Several members of the Angels' Montreal chapter—which was the oldest Angels chapter in Canada, being founded in 1977—resented the way in which the Nomads came to overshadow them as the premier Hells Angels chapter in Canada, but none dared to challenge Boucher.

=== Death of Daniel Desrochers ===
On 9 August 1995, a drug dealer named Marc Dubé was killed by a bomb planted in his jeep. Daniel Desrochers, an 11-year-old boy playing across the street, was also killed by debris from the explosion. Dubé was leaving the Hells Angels clubhouse in the Hochelaga-Maisonneuve neighborhood of Montreal at the time of his murder, and it remains unclear whether it was the Angels or the Rock Machine who planted the bomb.

Kane, in his reports to Verdon mentioned that Steinert, whom he described as an arrogant and aggressive bully, was acting very strangely after the death of Desrochers. Kane described Steinert as acting very worried, and expressing the fear that he might finally have go to prison or be deported from Canada, which led Kane to the conclusion that he was the one who planted the bomb that had killed Desrochers, and was now worried about a police crackdown. Steinert felt no guilt about the death of a child. Kane reported: "Since that day, Steinert no longer talked about the bombs he had ordered and never spoke again about using bombs. Steinert asked some of his crew what they thought of the bombing ... When they told him they thought the murderer should be liquidated, Steinert didn't respond and became very pensive".

According to Kane, Boucher and Steinert had discussed a plan to win over public opinion by killing one of their own in an especially brutal manner out of the hope that the public would blame the Rock Machine; Dubé who was a low level drug dealer working for the Angels was chosen as the one to be sacrificed.

A RCMP report described Steinert as a "very violent and cruel psychopath who can't control himself", concluding he was the prime suspect for the bombing. The RCMP stated that the fact that whoever controlled the bomb that killed Dubé was aware that there were children playing across the street fitted in with what was known of Steinert's character and with what Kane had reported. Commander André Bouchard of the Service de police de la Ville de Montréal stated: "I'm convinced today that the person who pressed the button to have the bomb explode saw children across the street. There was no way he could not see the children across the street". Renaud Jomphe who was president of the Rock Machine Montreal chapter was interviewed and told reporter Michel Auger of the Journal de Montreal, that "we don't attack or target, and we certainly don't kill, children". He also stated the Hells Angels as a "bunch of goons on a power trip".

=== Killing of Richard "Crow" Émond and bombings ===
On 15 September 1995, Richard "Crow" Émond was gunned down in a parking lot while helping his girlfriend get out of a car, becoming the first fully patched Hells Angel to be killed by the Rock Machine. Émond had just replaced Roy as the president of the Trois-Rivières chapter. On 21 September, the day after Émond's funeral, three Rock Machine members – Benoit Grignon, Daniel Paul and Pierre Patry – were killed as they tried to plant a bomb outside of the Saint-Luc clubhouse of the Jokers, an Angels puppet club whose activities were previously overseen by Émond. Grignon, Paul and Patry died when a Jokers member fired a shotgun at the trio, which caused the explosive to detonate.

Two other bombings were also carried out on the same day, one targeting a strip club in Laval, and other at a used car dealership in Montréal-Est. No casualties were reported in these attacks, although several cars at the dealership were damaged.

=== Police involvement and Operation Carcajou ===
In response to the public outrage over the death of Desrochers, the federal, Quebec, and Montreal governments announced on 5 October 1995 the much vaunted Operation Carcajou, an elite joint task force consisting of the best detectives from the Royal Canadian Mounted Police, the Sûreté du Québec and the Service de police de la Ville de Montréal. They sought to end the biker war swiftly, and bring to justice those responsible for the death of Desrochers.

==== Commander Bouchard ====
Commander Bouchard joined Operation Carcajou in 1995 and started with raiding businesses controlled by the outlaw bikers. Bouchard was always dressed in his full uniform in order to show he was not afraid of the bikers.

Initially Bouchard described Carcajou as an impressively well-funded operation with the most modern equipment, but described the Sûreté du Québec detectives who were a part of Operation Carcajou as having questionable ethics. In a visit to Quebec City, Bouchard was taken by several Sûreté du Québec detectives to a restaurant where all the food and drinks were on the house. Bouchard described the scene: "I walk in and they got a party going on in there. This was a sit-down supper, you know-booze and wine at $50 a bottle. Nobody's paying. And you're starting to think, what the fuck is going on here? Is this a protected bar? Ah, okay. So they never take down a Hells Angel or a Rock Machine or someone who's in the bar. They let him alone. That's not good".

Bouchard also described the Sûreté du Québec detectives as having dubious expense accounts. Bouchard stated: "My guys from Montreal are interrogating a source at some motel and they order a pizza and four Cokes or whatever, talk to the guy for a couple of hours and then they order a club sandwich. But the SQ guys were coming in [with invoices for stays at the] Ritz Carlton, steak dinner, wine. I was asked to sign bills for $800. I go 'fuck you, I'm not signing this. You interrogate a piece of shit, you interrogate him in a motel-you don't bring him to the fucking Ritz".

Bouchard eventually left Operation Carcajou in 1996, stating it was out of disgust with the uncooperative attitude of the Sûreté du Québec: "They were doing secret jobs. We didn't know. We found out the next morning: there'd be seven guys in the cells. Where the fuck did they come from? That's when it got a little rough".

==== Political issues between federal and Quebec governments ====
Operation Carcajou proved to be a fiasco because of politics. From 1994 to 2003, Quebec was governed by the separatist Parti Québécois (PQ) and relations between Ottawa and Quebec City, which were difficult in the best of times, were highly acrimonious. Throughout the biker war, the PQ government blamed the Liberal Prime Minister Jean Chrétien, claiming the existing laws were insufficient to deal with bikers. PQ officials also claimed that Canada needed a tough anti-gang law modeled after the American RICO act that would make membership in criminal organizations illegal. The Chrétien government for a long time resisted this pressure, claiming the existing laws were adequate to deal with the biker war and that it was just up to Quebec to apply them. Both sides had their own agenda with Quebec City using the unwillingness of the federal government to pass a RICO-type act as evidence of Ottawa's supposed indifference to Quebec, thus justifying separatism while Ottawa used the inability of Quebec City to deal with the biker war as evidence of Quebec's incompetence in maintaining law and order, thus justifying federalism.

The feuding between the federal and Quebec governments affected Operation Carcajou with the RCMP and the Sûreté du Québec. Detectives spent their time feuding with one another and made almost no serious efforts to investigate crimes committed by the bikers as the detectives were much more interested in pursuing their vendettas against one another. One detective who served on Operation Carcajou later told journalists William Marsden and Julian Sher that Operation Carcajou was completely ineffective, owing to the poisoned relations between Quebec City and Ottawa during this period.

Sergeant Gaetan St.Onge of the RCMP who served with the Carcajou squad stated: "Wolverine was a total circus. The SQ was jealous of the RCMP source [Kane]. They were always asking his name. The SQ used to give out the names of their sources all the time. They didn't care if they were blown. They treated them like dirt. At meetings they would just blurt their sources's name and expect everybody to keep it quiet". Typical of the approach of the Carcajou squad was the police reaction to the funeral of the Hells Angel Robert "Tiny" Richard on 29 February 1996. Out of the concern of a possible Rock Machine attack on those attending the funeral, the Carcajou squad sent some extra police officers to provide security, leading the president of provincial police unit, Luc Savard, to denounce the squad as he maintained the Sorel police force was capable of providing the security. Likewise, the mayor of Quebec City, Jean-Paul L'Allier, wanted the Carcajou squad to take anti-biker activity in his city, believing that the non-involvement of Quebec City police would save his city money.

==== The Crown struggles to build a case ====
Kane told his handlers in 1995 that somebody in the senior ranks of the Montreal police was selling Boucher information, as Boucher had often boasted to him that he knew everything that police knew about him. Kane also told the RCMP that the Hells Angels paid double a policeman's weekly salary for information, and that much of the Montreal police were working for them, causing him to ask that RCMP should never share information with the Montreal police lest he be exposed. His claims of corruption were not unfounded. Benoît Roberge, a senior detective with the Service de police de la Ville de Montréal in charge of stopping the guerre des motards, instead cultivated a close business relationship with a Hells Angels leader named René Charlebois, selling him information.

An additional problem with handling outlaw biker cases was the state of the Crown Attorneys in Quebec. There were 84 Crown Attorneys (prosecutors) in Montreal who had four secretaries at their service, requiring the Crown Attorneys to do much of their paperwork themselves, leaving them little time to prepare for cases. Furthermore, until 2002, the Crown Attorneys in Quebec were not provided with computers, forcing them to write out their notes on typewriters or by hand, nor did they have access to online criminal databases. The law library in Montreal was so antiquated that Crown Attorneys sometimes had to ask defence lawyers for information on the current jurisprudence. Crown Attorneys in Quebec had the lowest salaries for prosecutors in Canada, receiving half of what Crown Attorneys made in Ontario, and those who took on outlaw biker cases received no security for themselves or their families. Typically a single Crown Attorney would be assigned a case concerning outlaw bikers instead of the four or six that were normally assigned in other provinces, and those who could not handle the pressure were seen as failures by their superiors. As the outlaw bikers usually had well-paid defence lawyers, the Crown Attorneys often found themselves overwhelmed by the heavy burden of work, leading to frequent burnouts.

René Domingue, the Crown Attorney who prosecuted the men responsible for the Lennoxville massacre in 1986, was assigned to the Operation Carcajou squad as its legal counsel in 1995. Domingue stated that the Crown gave the Carcajou squad a budget of $5 million, but none for the Crown Attorneys, saying: "I was alone on a part-time basis. I was running around like mad and unable to do any decent work". Another Crown Attorney, François Legault, who prosecuted Hells Angel Richard Vallée in 1997, found himself handling the case alone and having to do some of the police work himself. Legault stated: "The police were totally disorganised. They didn't know how to do a case like this. They didn't have the structure to properly organise the evidence." After working for 75 hours per week on the Vallée case for over a year without any help, Legault had a nervous breakdown and lost the case.

Crown Attorney Lucie Dufresne found herself in 1998 taking on five defence lawyers on the case of five Rockers charged with killing Jean-Marc Caissey of the Rock Machine. Dufresne said: "I asked for help and I was refused. This was a huge case with all sorts of proof, electronic wiretaps, an informant. And I was told, 'There's nobody available'". In the middle of the trial, Dufresne suffered what she called her "humiliating" nervous breakdown. Dufrense has not tried a case since 1998, saying: "I adore it, but I am not longer capable. You push and push and push until the machine breaks. The vision here is always short term". Domingue told the journalists Julien Sher and William Marsden: "If you look at the rate or percentages of success in cases solved against the Hells Angels, I would say they kill with impunity. They have reasons to laugh at the law because they could do what they wanted but for the odd arrest here and there. We ended up being their best place to prosper. We didn't take them seriously enough".

In Canada, belonging to a criminal organization like the Mafia or the Hells Angels was not in itself a crime, and prosecutors could only convict a Mafioso or Hell's Angel if it could be established that they had committed a crime. Under the RICO act in the United States, membership of a criminal organization was made a criminal offence, thus making the job of American prosecutors much easier. The Chrétien government refused to pass a RICO-type law, citing concerns about civil liberties, and the closest it came was with Bill C-95 in 1997 that increased the penalties if it could be established that someone had committed a crime in the service of a criminal organization. Bill C-95 was passed in 1997 and journalists Timothy Appleby and Tu Thanh Ha of The Globe and Mail observed in 2000 that nobody had been convicted under Bill C-95 offences.

==== Carcajou's strategy to end the war ====
In 1997, the Carcajou squad decided the best way to end the war was to put the Rock Machine out of business, arguing that the Rock Machine was the weaker of the two clubs, and the war would end once the Rock Machine was removed from the scene. On 29 January 1997, seven Rock Machine members were arrested on charges of conspiracy to commit murder in connection with the failed murder plot against Boucher in 1994. In May 1997, the Rock Machine clubhouses in Montreal and Quebec City were raided while the police arrested 18 Rock Machine members and seized 325 kilos(716.5 lbs) of explosives, particularly TNT. The police confiscated the Montreal clubhouse after drugs were found within the premises.

== 1996: Interlude ==
Reflecting the way that the Angels were winning the war, in October 1995, Harold Pelletier, one of the heads of the Pelletier Clan, turned himself in to the Sûreté du Québec, confessing that on the night of 7 August 1983, he murdered a drug dealer named Michel Beaulieu, who was behind in his payments to the Pelletier Clan. Pelletier asked that the police provide him with protection from the Angels in exchange for more information about his crimes. Ultimately, Pelletier confessed to committing 17 murders between 1983 and 1995, yet he was only convicted of the murder of Beaulieu. Pelletier's murder of Beaulieu was classified as second degree murder, despite the fact Beaulieu had fallen asleep after Pelletier got him drunk before he opened fire. Since the murder was premeditated, it should have been classified as a first degree murder.

In his plea bargain struck in June 1996, Pelletier was sentenced to life imprisonment with a promise that he receive full parole after 10 years served, in exchange for which he shared all he knew about the Montreal underworld. The Crown justified the plea bargain with Pelletier, given that he was guilty of 17 murders, on the grounds he was a "mine of information" about the underworld of Montreal. Pelletier's motives for striking a plea bargain was that the "Alliance against the Angels" was collapsing with Alliance members defecting over to the Angels, and he wanted Crown protection from the Angels. However, Pelletier violated the terms of his plea bargain, under which he promised not to commit any more crimes, when he was caught in 2002 attempting to bribe another prison inmate to kill a prisoner whom he disliked, allowing the Crown to revoke its agreement and Pelletier was not released in June 2006 as was promised 10 years earlier. Pelletier finally received full parole in December 2013 after he completed his high school equivalency degree, started attending Alcoholics Anonymous meetings, and demonstrated an ability to get along with penitentiary staff. In January 1996, a Hells Angels associate, Glenn Cormier, was murdered in Quebec City. In March 1996, Kane murdered a drug dealer, Roland Lebrasseur, who refused to buy drugs from the Hells Angels.

=== Steinert and the Sensations escort service (March 1996 - November 1996) ===
After getting over a scare caused by the killing of Desrochers, Steinert was living high at this time, receiving the "Filthy Few" patch in March 1996 awarded to those who killed for the Angels, and a full patch at the same time. Steinert was the biggest pimp in Montreal, owning the Sensations escort service, whose office in Montreal was destroyed in a case of arson in August 1996 by the Rock Machine. In mid 1996. Marcel Demers, who had been acting president of the Quebec City chapter created a second Rock Machine chapter in the city, it was located in the suburb of Beauport. With Demers becoming the president of the new Beauport chapter, Frédéric Faucher was promoted to president of the Quebec City chapter.

The success of the Sensations escort service caused tensions with Carroll, whose Adventure escort service suffered as Steinert wanted all of the profits from prostitution for himself. Steinert founded what he called his Groupe de Cinq to take over all the bars and night clubs on Crescent Street in Montreal and branching out into Ontario to take over the bars and nightclubs on York Street in Ottawa. Steinert also had plans to take over the bars, restaurants and nightclubs of Toronto, Kingston and Winnipeg. Not content with Canada, Steinert had got into contact with a New York Mafia family to send strippers from Quebec to a Mafia-owned resort in the Dominican Republic. The Hells Angels had their own surveillance unit with three vehicles equipped with hidden cameras with batteries that lasted for 72 hours that were discreetly placed on the streets to collect footage of various targets. The funeral of Mafia boss Frank Cotroni's mother was recorded as Boucher wanted footage of the faces and the license plates of all who attended the funeral. He was planning to liquidate the Cotroni family once he was finished with the Rock Machine.

Boucher approved of Steinert, whose work ethic contrasted strongly with Carroll who was a self-proclaimed "party animal". Kane mentioned to the RCMP that Steinert had been living in Montreal since he was a teenager, but that he had never taken Canadian citizenship, which led the Canadian government to go to the courts seeking an injunction to deport Steinert back to the United States. In May 1996, Steinert's bodyguard, Donald "Bam Bam" Magnussen, lost his temper at a party and murdered David Boyko, the leader of a Winnipeg biker gang, the Los Bravos, who were planning on "patching over" to become Hells Angels, which caused some problems with the Angels' plans to expand into the Prairies. Magnussen was unintelligent, and had only been recruited into the Angels because of his size, strength and brutality. Carroll become convinced that nobody could be as stupid as Magnussen was, which led him to the conclusion that Magnussen must be an undercover policeman working to destroy the Angels from within. Steinert was not included in the Nomads chapter, and was planning in October 1996 on forming his cell within the Montreal South chapter in what appeared to be a challenge to Boucher's authority. A month later in November 1996. The Rock Machine planted a bomb in the old Hells Angels bunker in St. Nicholas and the residential neighborhood where it was located was shaken by the immense force of the blast. The bunker received significant damage. Carroll ordered Kane to kill Magnussen, an order that Kane was reticent to fulfill as Magnussen was a full patch Hells Angel while Kane was only a Rocker; such a violation of Angels' etiquette could have resulted in Kane's own murder. At Kane's request, the police visited Magnussen to warn him that the other Angels were planning on killing him, but he dismissed the warnings completely as a police provocation intended to turn him against his "brothers".

In December 1995, Steinert purchased the mansion previously owned by the Lavigueur family in the 1980s, on Laval's expensive Île aux Pruches island (part of the Hochelaga Archipelago), where he was married in the summer of 1996. A deportation order was served on Steinert, who was born in Milwaukee, ordering him to leave Canada by 14 November 1996, but his lawyer was able to void the deportation order, arguing that Steinert had just married a Canadian woman with whom he had a child, making it inhumane to send him back to the United States. Besides the marriage ceremony at Lavigueur mansion, Steinert also used the estate to make a pornographic film entitled The Babe Angel, starring himself and 9 of his prostitutes. In August 1996, Salvatore Cazzetta who was being held in the Parthenais Detention Center prior to his extradition to the United States, was attacked and wounded by six other prisoners in a "jailhouse contract".

=== Killing of Jomphe and Deschenes (October 1996) ===
On 18 October 1996, the president of the Rock Machine Montreal chapter, Renaud Jomphe alongside Christian Deschenes of the Rock Machine were shot and killed while eating in a Chinese restaurant in Verdun. The Rock Machine leader was seated with fellow club members and Raymond Laureau in a booth at the rear of a Chinese restaurant known as Restaurant Kim Hoa, located on Wellington Street. A man entered the establishment and approached the table, fired several shots and fled out the rear of the building. Jomphe and Deschenes were killed, while Laureau was wounded in the shoulder. One of the Paradis Brothers, Peter Paradis, would succeed Jomphe as president of the Montreal chapter, taking over much of his business in the suburb of Verdun. As one of the club's most prominent members, Marcel Demers, became an assassination target for the Hells Angels.

In December 1996, Bruno Van Lerberghe, a member of the Quebec City chapter of the Hells Angels, was killed while eating at a restaurant, being shot six times. In February 1997, Magnussen beat up Leonardo Rizzuto, the son of Vito Rizzuto, in a bar fight, which led to a request from the Rizzuto family for Magnussen's murder.

== 1997: The war continues ==
=== Aime Simard and Gregory Wooley ===
On 28 March 1997, Kane's lover, Rocker member Aimé Simard — stating he was acting under the orders of the Rocker president, a man known as Gregory "Pissaro" Wooley — murdered Rock Machine member Jean-Marc Caissy as he entered a Montreal arena to play hockey with his friends. After being arrested, Simard agreed to work for the RCMP as he was terrified of his homosexuality being exposed. Simard also turned on his lover Kane, revealing to the police that Kane had committed three murders over the last two years which caused the RCMP to sever contact with Kane for two years. Simard gave the Crown evidence that Gregory "Pissaro" Wooley — a Haitian immigrant who was working as Boucher's bodyguard — was an assassin for the Angels, saying that, despite being black, Wooley was accepted by the otherwise all-white Angels as he was their best killer. Wooley had founded a street gang of fellow Haitian immigrants, based in the north end of Montreal in the poor neighborhood of St. Michel where many Haitians lived, initially known as the Crack Down Posse (CDP), and was renamed the Syndicate in 1998. They wore blue gang colors that were closely modeled after the hats and clothing worn by the Crips gang in the United States. The Syndicate began by engaging in extortion rackets and robbing dépanneurs (convenience stores) before moving on to serve as drug dealers and killers for the Angels, becoming well known in Montreal for doing the "dirty work" that even the Angels did not want to do. Wooley was president of the Rockers, the Angels' puppet club in Montreal, and, although he could never hope to join the Angels proper as a black man, he maintained very close ties with them. For reasons that remain unclear, Wooley had no qualms about serving as the bodyguard for the white supremacist Boucher. However, Simard proved to be a poor witness on the stand and Wooley's trial for first degree murder ended with his acquittal. Afterwards, the Crown disavowed Simard, saying that he failed to fulfill his side of the bargain as Wooley was still a free man and ended its protection for him in 1999, placing him in the general prison population.

The Angels put out a jailhouse contract on Simard's life, and in 2003 he was murdered by fellow inmates who stabbed him to death with homemade knives, inflicting over 187 stab wounds, at the federal prison where he was being held in Saskatchewan.

=== Cazzetta and Vezina arrested ===
In May 1997, Giovanni Cazzetta of the Rock Machine was arrested when a Rock Machine member turned police informer asked him to buy 15 kilos of cocaine. Cazzetta introduced the informer to Richard Matticks, the brother of Gerald Matticks of the West End Gang. Matticks told the informer he could not supply 15 kilos of cocaine on a very short notice, but did sell him 9 kilos for $350,000. Cazzetta was sent back to prison for violating his 1993 parole and in 1998 was sentenced to 9 years after his conviction. Matticks was sentenced to 3 years in prison.

On 21 May 1997, national president Claude Vézina and his sergeant-at-arms Dany "Le Gros" Légaré were both charged with the trafficking of narcotics. In order to conduct his arrest, police had to sneak by guard dogs that he had located on his property; they entered his home and arrested him in his bedroom. This was all the result of a sting operation set up by the Quebec police. A police informant had completed seven transactions of narcotics with the two members of Rock Machine, during a five-month period. The massive raid launched by authorities as part of Operation Carcajou resulted in the seizure of a laboratory where narcotics such as PCP and methamphetamine were produced. $1,500,000 worth of various other narcotics, over 325 kg (716.5 lbs) of dynamite along with detonators, seven pistols, two fully automatic machine guns, three semi-automatic carbines and a pistol suppressor. After the arrest of Vézina, Frédéric Faucher became the Rock Machine's new national president on 11 September 1997, Alain "Red Tomato" Brunette was promoted to president of the Quebec City chapter.

=== Rock Machine seeks help from the Bandidos ===
At the same, the Great Nordic Biker War was taking place, and the Rock Machine was impressed with the way that the Scandinavian branches of the Bandidos held their own against the Scandinavian branches of the Hells Angels. In June 1997, the three leaders of the Rock Machine, Fred Faucher, Johnny Plescio, and Robert "Tout Tout" Léger, went to Stockholm to seek support from the Swedish branch of the Bandidos, but were expelled by the Swedish police, who declared that they did not want Canadian bikers in their country. Faucher had gained wide attention in underworld circles by blowing up the Hells Angels clubhouse in Quebec City in February 1997 and after the Rock Machine's leader Claude "Ti-Loup" Vézina was arrested for drug smuggling, he became the Rock Machine's new leader on 11 September 1997. Faucher decided the best hope for the Rock Machine was to have the club absorbed into the Bandidos, the second-largest outlaw biker club in the world in a bid to "internationalize" the conflict. He invited George Wegers, the president of Bandidos USA, to visit Canada; however, a dinner that Faucher held for Wegers at an expensive Quebec City restaurant on 28 October 1997 ended in fiasco when the police arrived to announce that since Wegers had a lengthy criminal record in the United States that he was not wanted in Canada, and they were there to escort him back to the airport to put him on the first flight back to the United States. A former Rock Machine member, Normand Brisebois, stated in an interview: "The Hells Angels were ten times more powerful and organized than us." Another former Rock Machine member, Gilles Lalonde stated: "The Rock Machine were more like just drug dealers. They weren't much of an organzied club. The Hells Angels were more like a big business". There was a widespread belief within the Rock Machine that joining the Bandidos was their only hope to win the biker war.

=== Steinert and Donald Magnussen killed ===
Two members of the Angels who came into conflict with Boucher were Steinert and Donald Magnussen. David "Wolf" Carroll, one of the Nomads, charged that the two were working for the police, noting that the Crown was completely unsuccessful in its efforts to deport Steinert back to the United States, which led him to the conclusion that Steinert must have been working for the police.

Kane, who was anxious to distract attention from himself, did everything to encourage Carroll in this line of thinking, saying Steinert must be the police "mole" inside the Angels. Contributing to suspicions about Steinert and Magnussen was the interception of a shipment containing 31 kilograms of marijuana and 200 Ecstasy pills sent by the duo to be sold to drug dealers in northern Ontario. While the RCMP was tipped-off by Kane, he accused Steinert and Magnussen of the tip-off.

Steinert and Magnussen were last seen alive on 4 November 1997, leaving the Lavigueur mansion to see Boucher. The bodies of Steinert and Magnussen were later found floating in the St. Lawrence river, with their hands tied behind their backs and their heads beaten to a bloody mush, showing wounds from repeated blows from baseball bats and hammers.

=== Hells' Angels learns of the Dark Circle ===
In 1997, an imprisoned Hells Angel, Denis Houle, was the victim of an unsuccessful assassination attempt when a Rock Machine member opened fire on him from beyond the prison fence. The resulting investigation first alerted the public to the existence of the Dark Circle, and it was reported the Hells Angels would pay well for information identifying the members of the Dark Circle. Over the next two years, two members of the Dark Circle were murdered by the Angels while a third only escaped.

=== Stéphane Gagné and Boucher's arrest ===
Stéphane "Godasse" Gagné, a petty criminal from the Hochelaga-Maisonneuve district of Montreal who joined the Angels, wanted desperately to join the Nomads, regarded as the elite of the Hells Angels, and to do so agreed to murder prison guards for Maurice "Mom" Boucher, the leader of the Hells Angels in Quebec. On 26 June 1997, Gagné, and another Hells Angels biker, André "Toots" Tousignant, murdered a prison guard, Diane Lavigne, gunning her down on the streets of Montreal while riding a motorcycle. Gagné and Tousignant were promoted up on 1 July 1997 to become "prospects" with the Hells Angels, giving them the right to wear partial Hells Angels patches as a reward for killing Lavigne.

The police listened to Tousignant call his wife Eve to tell her "I got my patch yesterday", leading her to say "I'm so proud of you". Tousignant then called his mistress to break the news, leading her to say "Congratulations!". On 8 September 1997, Gagné and a fellow biker, Paul "Fon Fon" Fontaine, gunned down the prison guard Pierre Rondeau.

During the attack on a prison van carrying prisoners from Rivière-des-Prairies prison to court on the morning of 8 September 1997, Gagné and Fontaine began to shoot up the front seats of the van with their handguns, killing Pierre Rondeau and badly wounding another guard, Robert Corriveau, who was critically injured but survived. Gagné's gun jammed, which saved Corriveau's life, as Fontaine decided that since Corriveau was already badly bleeding, he would die before an ambulance arrived.

In response to the murders of Lavigne and Rondeau, Commander André Bouchard launched Project HARM in the fall of 1997, raiding bars, restaurants, and strip clubs controlled by the Hells Angels and the Rock Machine hoping to find something that would lead him to the killers of Lavigne and Rondeau. On 4 December 1997, Bouchard received a call for help from a police officer raiding a stripper's agency run by the Hells Angels. Upon arriving wearing his full dress uniform as usual, Bouchard was confronted by a burly Hells Angel who wanted to fight him, leading him to punch out the Angel and ask "Anybody else want some?" In the stripper's agency, the police found 67 guns, photos of the Angels having sex with the strippers and each other (full patch Angels often sodomize hang-around and prospect Angels to assert domination), and some $2.5 million worth of cocaine. One of those arrested was a Peruvian drug dealer, known as Steve Boies, who had assisted Gagné with cleaning up after the murders and named him as the killer in exchange for a lesser sentence and a promise not to deport him back to Peru.

On 5 December 1997, Gagné was arrested, and after a lengthy interrogation by Detective Sergeant Robert Pigeon, confessed. Pigeon described Gagné as a weak character, a man easily dominated by others, and observed all that was needed was to apply some pressure on him to make him break down in tears and confess.

Gagné agreed to turn over evidence to the Crown after he was arrested in December 1997, and in his confession he named Tousignant and Fontaine as his fellow killers. Fontaine fled to Mexico after Gagné implicated him where he lived for a number of years. He later returned to Canada, and in May 2004 he was arrested in Quebec City, where he was living under an assumed name (Jean Goyer). In October 2008, he went on trial in Montreal and was convicted in February 2009 of one count of first degree murder for killing Rondeau.

Tousignant, a prospect for the Nomads who disappeared after Gagné's confession, was found murdered, being shot twice and his body then set afire. Tousignant was last seen alive on 7 December 1997 going to see Boucher. Fontaine's boyfriend was Serge Boutin, the chief drug-dealer in Montreal's Gay Village. Unlike Tousignant, Fontaine was kept alive as Boucher wanted to keep the services of Boutin. The corpse of Tousignant was found buried in a shallow grave in the Eastern Townships on 27 February 1998 and his murder was never solved.

On 18 December 1997, Boucher was arrested and charged with two counts of first degree murder.

1997 saw 27 murders committed as part of the biker war.

== 1998: Height of violence ==
Throughout the guerre des motards, the more powerful and better organized Hells Angels consistently held the upper hand over the Rock Machine, which had previously controlled all of the non-Mafia organized crime in Quebec. In 1998, Jacques Lemieux of the Royal Canadian Mounted Police told The Economist that the Hells Angels were seeking control of the narcotics trade, automobile theft, prostitution, smuggling, illegal gambling and extortion rackets in Quebec. In the same interview, Detective Lemieux said: "Bikers seem a lot more active in Canada than elsewhere, and a lot more violent in Quebec." The Hells Angels had of the Société de l'Assurance Automobile du Québec that issues drivers' licenses, namely Ginette Martineau and Raymond Turgeon, working for them. Between 23 November 1999 and 31 October 2000, Turgeon and Martineau sold to the Rockers for mere $200 each the home addresses of 25 Rock Machine members, of whom four were killed.

=== Continued killings of Rock Machine members ===
On 20 February 1998, Denis Belleau of the Rock Machine was shot dead while he was eating in Quebec City restaurant. On 30 July 1998, Richard "Bab Bam" Legace of the Rock Machine was killed while he was leaving a Montreal gym. On 23 August 1998, a team of Rock Machine killers that said to consist of Frédéric Faucher, Gérald Gallant, and Marcel Demers rode by on their motorcycles and gunned down Paolo Cotroni in his driveway. Cotroni was a member of the Calabrian 'Ndrangheta Cotroni crime family who were the rivals of the Sicilian Mafia Rizzuto crime family. Cotroni was killed partly to gain the favor of the Rizzutos and partly because he was a friend of Boucher.

On 8 September 1998, Johnny Plescio—a founding member of the Rock Machine and president of its Pointe-aux-Trembles chapter in Montreal—was at his Laval home watching television when his cable was severed. As he rose to see what was wrong with his television, 27 bullets went through Plescios's living room window, 16 of which struck him. At Plescio's funeral, a flower arrangement appeared bearing the word Bandidos, which was the first sign that the Bandidos Motorcycle Club of Texas was taking an interest in the Rock Machine. Normand Whissel would succeed Plescio as president of the Pointe-aux-Trembles chapter.

On 10 November 1998, Stéphane Morgan of the Rock Machine and his bodyguard Daniel Boulet were shot dead in Morgan's house outside of his home.

=== The end of the Dark Circle ===
Disaster struck the Dark Circle, when one of their number, Salvatore Brunnettii, a restaurateur, bar owner and drug dealer, defected to the Hells Angels and gave them a list of the remaining members of the Dark Circle. Jean Rosa, a 32 year old businessman who lived in a middle class suburb of Montreal was found shot in front of his Pontiac Grand Prix on his driveway on the morning of 25 September 1998, and died of blood loss at the hospital later that day. Rosa was a member of the Dark Circle, and his neighbors were shocked to learn that respectable Rosa was in fact a gangster whose home had been purchased with profits from the drug trade, laundered through the bar Rosa owned.

At about 8 pm on 22 October 1998, Pierre Bastien, who owned another successful bar, had just parked his car on the driveway at his suburban home, and as he went to open the rear door of his automobile for his 8-year-old daughter, he was shot in the head at point blank range. Bastien was also a member of the Dark Circle and his bar was also a front for laundering drug money. To save their lives, several other members of the Dark Circle turned themselves into the police and confessed to their crimes, saying that they would be safer in prison than they would be as free men.

At least one member of the Dark Circle who went to prison was later offered full parole for good behavior, which he declined, saying the Angels would kill him for certain if he got out of prison, and it was his wish to spend the rest of his life in prison. Another member of the Dark Circle, a restaurateur and bar owner named Claude Joannette, in contrast followed Brunnettii in defecting over to the Angels, agreeing to launder drug money for them in exchange for his life.

=== Boucher acquitted (November 1998) ===
On 27 November 1998, Boucher was acquitted of ordering the murder of the two prison guards in 1997, and afterwards became a folk hero in Quebec, with people in the poor neighborhood of Hochelaga-Maisonneuve in Montreal cheering Boucher and his fellow Angels as they rode their Harley-Davidson motorcycles down the streets like it was a royal procession. On the night of 27 November 1998, to celebrate his acquittal, Boucher attended a boxing match in Verdun with his fellow Nomads, with the audience cheering him as he took his seat and hundreds of people lining up to get his autograph. Boucher become a celebrity in Quebec, despite or perhaps because of the violence of the biker war, with many polls showing that he was one of the most popular and best loved man in la belle province with much of the Quebec media offering fawning coverage of the charismatic Boucher. The Crown was stunned by Boucher's popularity with ordinary Québecois with many police officers and prosecutors saying this reflected the moral decay of Québecois society.

=== The Poitras commission ===
Despite the outrage, little was done to stop the carnage as the Service de police de la Ville de Montréal, which has long been notorious as the most corrupt police force in Canada, preferred to take bribes from both biker gangs and look the other way. Those policemen unwilling to accept bribes from the bikers found themselves receiving death threats and their cars were torched by arsonists. In 1998, one policeman who worked undercover in Montreal complained it was impossible to have charges filed against the bikers stick in court as judges, prosecutors, and jurors had all been bribed.

The Royal Commission chaired by Justice Lawrence Poitras that was set up to examine the Sûreté du Québec after the case against the West End Gang boss Gerald Matticks collapsed when detectives were caught planting evidence, blasted Operation Carcajou as a colossal waste of money in its 1998 report. The Poitras Commission in its report stated that Operation Carcajou was characterized by dysfunctional relationships, clashing egos, and bureaucratic in-fighting with the Service de police de la Ville de Montréal only interested in making a power grab, and the RCMP and Sûreté du Québec, only interested in ensuring that the blame for the continuing biker war fell on the other service. The Poitras commission spoke of "a virtual police war was being waged" inside the Carcajou squad with the detectives from the RCMP and the Sûreté du Québec openly feuding with each other. The Poitras report blasted the chief of the Carcajou squad, Michel Arcand of the Sûreté du Québec, saying he had a "contemptuous" attitude about upholding the law and that it was "totally inappropriate" for him to be the director of the Carcajou squad. As a result, Arcand was sacked as the chief of the Carcajou squad.

== 1999: Rock Machine retaliates and the killing of Hervieux ==
The Rock Machine motorcycle club gained the status of a "hang-around" club in May 1999 and after eighteen months, became a probationary chapter of the Bandidos Motorcycle Club on 1 December 2000. Bandidos National Officer Edward Winterhalder was put in charge of overseeing the transition by Bandidos International President, George Wegers. The original version of the Rock Machine (1986–1999) in Canada changed their colors from black and platinum to red and gold in May 1999; their colors remained red and gold until they became "full-patch" Bandidos on 1 December 2001 in a "patch-over" ceremony at the Rock Machine's Kingston chapter clubhouse. Unlike the Hells Angels, those bikers joining the Bandidos had to enter as "probationary" members regardless of what their membership had been in the Rock Machine, which was considered very off-putting, causing several members to join the Angels. On 6 December 2000, Faucher was arrested on multiple charges, and Alain Brunette became the new national president of the Rock Machine.

=== Bomb plot (April 1999) ===
In April 1999, five powerful bombs were found next to five different police stations, including the one where Bouchard worked, and only failed to explode because the bomb-maker had attached faulty detonators. The bombs had been planted by a Hells Angels puppet gang, the Scorpions, and one of those involved later testified that the orders came from Boucher. In the summer of 1999, a bizarre incident occurred on the streets of Montreal when Wooley was riding his Harley-Davidson motorcycle while wearing his Rocker patch on his vest and was pulled over for speeding. The constable who pulled over Wooley, Michel Bureau, claimed he was frightened when he noticed that Wooley had something under his vest, saying that knew Wooley was an especially violent man as he was the only black outlaw biker in Montreal, and offered to drop the fine if Wooley would show him what was under his vest. When Wooley refused, Constable Bureau said it didn't matter if Wooley was carrying drugs, he was willing to drop the charges just as long as Wooley showed him what was under his vest. When Wooley informed Bureau that he was not under arrest, and that it was none of his business what he had under his vest, Bureau called for back-up to and thus it took five officers to arrest Wooley for speeding. No guns or drugs were found on Wooley, though a handgun was found lying on the streets close to the arrest scene, which Wooley's lawyers claimed was planted by the police. Later, the judge threw out all of the charges, ruling that this was not a routine pull-over, and suggested it was an unusually clumsy attempt on the part of the police to entrap Wooley. During his time in jail while awaiting the charges, Wooley was involved in three different fights with the other inmates and an attempt to smuggle PCP into the jail, before finally being separated from the other inmates on the grounds he was too violent.

=== Killing of Serge Hervieux (August 1999) ===
In one of the most notorious incidents of the biker war, on 26 August 1999, two Rockers entered a car rental agency in the Saint Leonard neighborhood of Montreal and asked to see "Serge". The "Serge" they wanted to see was Serge Brunneau, the owner of the agency and a member of the Dark Circle. But one of his employees, a Serge Hervieux, told them "Je suis Serge" "("I am Serge"), at which point they opened fire with their .357 Magnum handguns, putting four bullets into the unfortunate Hervieux, killing him instantly while Brunneau hid under his desk. Hervieux, a married man with two children, was the wrong Serge and had no involvement with organized crime. Beside killing the wrong man, the killers, Jean-Richard "Race" Larivière and Eric "Pif" Fournier, also failed to set fire to their getaway car, a stolen Chrysler Intrepid, leaving behind in the trunk a mass of evidence incriminating them, not the least of which was that their fingerprints were over the papers listing the address of the car rental agency. Despite killing the wrong man, both men were promoted to full patch Rockers, making them well on their way to finally becoming Hells Angels. Despite a promise to the police that the violence would stop, on 1 October 1999, the president of Rock Machine's Pointe-aux-Trembles chapter, Tony Plescio, brother of Johnny Plescio, was gunned down in the parking lot of a Montreal McDonald's where he was taking his family to dinner. Other members of the Rock Machine killed in 1999 included Richard Relative and Serge Boisvert. Boisvert while high on drugs walked down the street in a small town while waving about an AK-47 rifle and was shot down by the police when he refused an order to put down his gun. Bouivert's brother Hectror stated: "He knew he was going to die soon, eventually, that is certain". On 1 May 2000, a drug dealer working for Rock Machine, Patrick Turcotte, was lethally shot in the back leaving a store renting pornographic videos by a man riding a blue van using a Beretta handgun equipped with a silencer. Turcotte's killers, two Rockers named Pierre "Peanut" Laurin and Paul "Schtrompf" Brisebois, were rewarded by being promoted to prospects for the Hells Angels.

== 2000: Continued killings and truce ==
=== Boucher's internet company plot ===
Kane was not a Nomad, but in early 2000, he began to work as a chauffeur for a Nomad, Normand Robitaille, driving him all over Montreal as Robitaille met with other Hells Angels and occasionally the Mafia. Kane reported to his RCMP handlers that Robitaille had told him during one of their car rides that he, Boucher, and Robert Savard, one of the most notorious loan sharks in Montreal, were going to start an internet company that would allow all of the pawnshops of Quebec to sell their wares online in exchange for a monthly fee. However, the twist to the plan was that any pawnshop owner who refused to list his products with the planned company would have his business burned down. Robitaille added that Angels had already been sent around to warn pawnshop owners that they would either list with the planned company or see their businesses destroyed by arsonists. Though the Rizzuto family leaned towards the Angels, one of the Rizzuto capos, Paolo Gervasi was a supporter of the Rock Machine, selling them drugs and reserving a table for them at his strip club. In April 2000, Gervasi's son, Salvatore, who was also a Mafioso, was murdered and his corpse placed inside his Porsche, which was left outside his father's house. Paolo Gervasi survived an assassination attempt later that year, but on 22 January 2004 he was killed while entering an Italian bakery.

In July 2000, Boucher's plans to set up an internet company were derailed when Robert "Bob" Savard, the loan shark who charged 52% interest on the loans he made to the desperate and needy, was gunned down at the Déjeuners Eggstra! restaurant in the north end of Montreal, Savard had been a Hells Angels associate for several years and was considered a right-hand man for Boucher. Savard's dinner companion, Norm Descoteaux, a hockey player turned loan shark, was also a target, but he survived by grabbing a waitress, Hélène Brunet, and using her as an involuntary human shield, ensuring that she took four bullets meant for him. Despite the way Brunet took bullets in her arms, legs and shin, Descoteaux was not charged.

The shooters were infamous Canadian hitman, Gérald Gallant and an unidentified associate. Gallant was employed by a member of the Dark Circle and also frequently carried out contracts for the Rock Machine during the conflict with the Hells Angels. Between 1980 and 2003, he was responsible for 28 murders and 13 attempted murders. His most active years were during the Quebec Biker War when he killed two members of Hells Angels puppet clubs in 1997 and wounded a third. In 1998 he eliminated five men, including Paul Cotroni Jr., son of mob boss Frank Cotroni, making 1998 his most busy year as a hitman.

=== Killing of Hamel and Desjardins ===
On 17 April 2000, Normand Hamel, one of the Nomads, was killed when attempting to flee from Rock Machine assassins in a Laval parking lot while he and his wife were taking his son to the doctor. Hamel was the most senior Hells Angel to be killed in the biker war. Boucher himself showed up at the crime scene to investigate Hamel's killing, and later the same night, Nomad Normand Bélanger, while using his cell phone that the police had tapped, was heard to say that Hamel's murder was "part of the game we play", but also "pretty disgusting", saying his wife and son should have not have seen his murder.

On 27 April 2000, Boucher's friend, André "Dédé" Desjardins, one of the most infamous construction union officials in Quebec and well known for extortion and loan sharking, was killed in the parking lot of a Montreal restaurant named Shawn's. Desjardins, the "King of Construction", had been the vice-president of the Fédération des travailleurs et travailleuses du Québec union in the 1970s, where he attracted much attention in 1974 when his union committed vandalism that had cost the sub-contractors on the James Bay project some $30 million as part of an extortion attempt, leading to the Cliche commission that found the construction industry in Quebec was systematically corrupt with the construction unions all controlled by the Mafia.

The journalists Julien Sher and William Marsden wrote that Desjardins's murder was not "an isolated killing over a simple debt", but rather "the beginning of a new era of consolidation of the Hells' now massive drug empire, which extended throughout Quebec and the Maritimes and was fast spreading into Ontario and western Canada". Desjardins's business partner Robert Savard was killed on 7 July 2000 after having breakfast with Boucher on the previous day and by October 2000, there had been 11 murders of "independent" gangsters not with the Rizzuto family who had previously been allies of the Hells Angels.

In June 2000, Sandra Craig, a Bolivian immigrant who was the daughter of one of Bolivia's most powerful drug lords, was almost killed by the Hells Angels on the streets of Montreal, and on 29 August 2000, her Canadian husband, Raymond Craig, was killed by the Angels in the resort town of St. Adèle; the Craigs had previously been the main link between the Colombian gangsters and the Rizzuto family and the Hells Angels in Montreal. In the summer of 2000, Michel Auger, the crime correspondent of Le Journal de Montréal, wrote a series of articles in Le Journal de Montréal stating that Boucher had turned on his former allies such as Desjardins, Savard and the Craigs and was systematically killing them off.

==== Angels retaliate ====
On 12 May 2000, the Angels attempted to kill the two Rock Machine members, Tony Duguay and Denis Boucher, suspected of killing Hamel, leading to a wild car crash, during which Duguay took bullet wounds to his arms, right hand, and thigh. Tony Duguay, the Rock Machine member who was convicted of killing Hamel in 2006, was acquitted in 2016 when it was established that the eyewitness who gave the testimony that had convicted him had been fed information incriminating him by Detective Benoît Roberge, the senior anti-biker detective with the Montreal police who was secretly working for the Hells Angels, and that the witness had not actually seen Duguay kill Hamel as he had testified during his trial. The witness stated in 2016 that everything he said at Duguay's trial was perjury, claiming that Detective Roberge had forced him to perjure himself. On 25 June 2000, Roy, the president of the Hells Angels Trois-Rivieres chapter, disappeared after attending a party to celebrate the 5th anniversary of the founding of the Nomads. Roy had frequently ignored Boucher's orders by selling cocaine for less than $50,000 per kilogram. In July 2001, Elias Lekkas, testified that Roy was taken to a meat-processing plant owned by Gerald Matticks and while still alive was run through a meat-processing machine. Regardless of his precise fate, Roy was never seen again after going to the party.

=== Charlebois' Wedding and Kane's suicide ===
A striking sign of the way in which the Hells Angels had become part of the mainstream of Quebec society occurred at the wedding of the Nomad René Charlebois on 5 August 2000, which was attended by Jean-Pierre Ferland and Ginette Reno, two of the best loved folk singers in French Canada, who both received a million dollars for singing at Charlebois's wedding. Both Ferland and Reno posed for photographs with Boucher for the Montreal tabloid Allô Police at the wedding, saying they both honored to meet such an outstanding man like Boucher. In particular, Reno, who has a very matronly and respectable image in Quebec, produced shock by her willingness to pose for photographs with the convicted rapist Boucher, who in 1984 had held a gun to the head of a 16-year-old girl, threatening to kill her on the spot if she did not have sex with him. Both Ferland and Reno later claimed that they were unaware that the Hells Angels are one of the most feared criminal syndicates in Quebec, saying they would never had attended the wedding if they had known, and denied that being paid a million dollars had anything to do with their willingness to perform at Charlebois's wedding.

A few days after Charlebois's wedding, Kane was found dead in the garage of his home, apparently a suicide. Found on his body was a rambling and confusing suicide note full of spelling mistakes and grammatical errors containing his reflections on morality, the ethics of betraying his biker friends for the Crown, and finally saying he was deeply confused about his sexuality, saying he was not certain if he was gay or just bisexual, which had apparently driven him to take his life.

=== The truce ===
On 13 September 2000, Michel Auger, the journalist covering guerre des motards for Le Journal de Montréal, was shot in the back five times while getting out of his car in the parking lot of said journal. After his attempted assassination, which was seen as an attack on the freedom of the press by the bikers, 200 journalists marched down the streets of Montreal in a rally two days later in a show of protest. The increased media coverage of crime in Montreal caused by the attempted murder of Auger made the Rizzuto crime family, regarded as the most powerful Mafia family in Canada with close connections to the Bonanno crime family of New York, seek a truce between the warring biker gangs.

On 26 September 2000, Vito Rizzuto held a meeting at an Italian restaurant named Bleu Martin attended by both Maurice "Mom" Boucher, the leader of Hells Angels in Quebec, and Frédéric "Fred" Faucher, the leader of the Rock Machine, in an attempt to impose a truce. On 8 October 2000 to celebrate Thanksgiving, Boucher and Faucher had dinner together at Bleu Martin and while a photographer from Allô Police recorded the scene, the leaders of the Hells Angels and the Rock Machine exchanged handshakes, hugged and broke bread together (a common symbol in French-Canada of reconciliation). To seal the truce, the biker leaders then went to the Super-Sexe, the most exclusive and expensive strip club in Montreal on the Rue Sainte-Catherine with the photographers from Allô Police covering their visit. One of the Angels present, Normand Robitaille, joked to two policemen waiting outside the Super-Sexe with notepads documenting who was going to the strip club that with the truce in effect, the police budget was to be cut quite drastically.

The truce imposed by the Rizzutos lasted only a few weeks and was ended when the Rock Machine agreed to join the Bandidos Motorcycle Club based in Texas. In a sort of reverse takeover, Faucher arranged for the Rock Machine to "patch over" to join the Bandidos in a bid to "internationalize" the conflict by involving the Bandidos, who were based in Texas. The Rock Machine was sponsored to "patch over" by the Swedish and French branches of the Bandidos while the American leadership disapproved, not wanting to be dragged into a war with the Hells Angels.

In 2000, a Montreal Crown attorney (a prosecutor) complained to the media that "they [the bikers] kill with impunity", saying it almost impossible to convict members of either the Hells Angels or the Rock Machine because of widespread corruption in the Quebec justice system. The public's perception that the Quebec justice system was too incompetent and corrupt to stop the bikers finally spurred the Crown to act decisively against the bikers. In a rare victory for the Crown, on 10 October 2000, a Montreal appeals judge undid double jeopardy, ruling that the Crown had presented credible evidence that the 1998 trial of Boucher was marred by intimidation of the jury and that the judge's instructions to the jury were defective, and as such, Boucher should be retried for the murders of Lavigne and Rondeau. Boucher's lawyer, Robert Lemieux, who was a celebrity in Quebec for his role defending members of the FLQ after the October Crisis of 1970, announced that his client had launched a $30 million lawsuit against the province of Quebec, alleging wrongful prosecution. Unfortunately for Boucher, he had written much of the letter of complaint himself, sparking widespread ridicule as his French was full of the spelling and grammatical mistakes that one would expect from a man who dropped out of school in grade 9.

== 2001 - Bandidos and police crackdown ==
=== Bandidos involvement ===
On 1 December 2000, the Rock Machine became a probationary chapter of the Bandidos. Unlike the Hells Angels, those bikers joining the Bandidos had to enter as "prospect" members regardless of what their membership had been in the Rock Machine, which was considered very off-putting, causing several members to join the Angels. Shortly afterwards, Faucher was arrested on charges of importing cocaine into Canada and the Rock Machine new president became Alain "Red Tomato" Brunette.

The truce had an ulterior motive for the Hells Angels who sought to divide those who wanted to join the Bandidos and those who did not. Most of the Ontario "Machinists" (biker slang for Rock Machine members) preferred to join the Hells Angels rather than the Bandidos. The Hells Angels national president, Walter Stadnick, offered the Hells Angels membership to the Rock Machine's Kingston, Niagara Falls and Toronto chapters while excluding the London chapter, saying that the members of the London chapter were unqualified to be Hells Angels. Some members of the Kingston chapter and a few of the Toronto chapter took up Stadnick's offer, as it was felt by some that the Bandidos patch with its cartoonish drawing of a Mexican bandit was "silly". Furthermore, Stadnick offered Hells Angels membership on a "patch-for-patch" basis, allowing members to trade their current patches for equivalent Hells Angels while the Bandidos required new members take a reduction in rank. Paul "Sasquatch" Porter, a founding member of the Rock Machine and the President of their Kingston chapter, was extremely influential in the club and was responsible for initiating the creation of the Rock Machine's three chapters in Ontario. Porter wrote on the wall of the clubhouse: "Hello to all the RMMC, I wish you the best with your new colors! Bye my brothers!" Porter became the president of the Hells Angels new Ottawa chapter. The fact that the Hells Angels had conspired to kill Porter when he was a member of the Rock Machine did not stop him from defecting. Porter brought over so many members of the Rock Machine/Bandidos to the Hells Angels as to cause the Toronto chapter to promptly collapse. Porter also persuaded André "Curly" Sauvageau, another prominent Rock Machine leader to join the Hells Angels. The defection of so many Rock Machine leaders such as Porter and Savageau further weakened the club.

On 29 December 2000, about 168 Ontario bikers rode over to Montreal for a mass "patch over" to join the Angels. The Satan's Choice, the Para-Dice Riders, the Los Lobos, and a number of other Ontario outlaw biker gangs all abandoned their old patches for the "Death's Head" patch of the Angels, finally allowing the Angels to enter southern Ontario. In a typical show of self-confidence, the photographers from Allô Police were invited to the Angels' bunker to record the "patch-over". On December 1, 2001, the Rock Machine Motorcycle Club became official members of the Bandidos Canada in a "patch-over" ceremony at the Rock Machine's Kingston chapter club house. The Bandidos Canada inherited seven new chapters (Montreal, Quebec City, Pointe-aux-Trembles, Beauport, Toronto, Kingston and Niagara Falls). The Scandinavian Bandidos sponsored the Rock Machine and were technically responsible, but the Canadian Bandidos ultimately took orders from the American mother chapter. It was stated by Jerry Langton: "The Rock Machine might have ceased to exist, but it wasn't because of the Hells Angels, instead of surrendering Faucher and his men wanted to get stronger". Shortly afterwards, on 6 December 2000, Faucher along with Marcel Demers, a founding member of the Rock Machine and President of its Beauport chapter, were arrested on multiple narcotics charges and for ordering a bombing that caused major damage to a Hells Angels bunker located in Saint-Nicolas. Police stated they were accused of distributed more than two kilograms of cocaine a month and generated almost $5 million in profits annually.

=== Alain Brunette takes over ===
Alain Brunette became the new national president. Jean-Claude Belanger would replace Brunette as president of the Quebec City chapter. Robert Léger would head the Beauport chapter until his death. Police reported that Faucher's arrest was due to the fact he was the leader of a narcotics empire and had been responsible for the bombing of the bunker and six other buildings between 1996 and 1997. According to authorities, he was earning $250,000 per month from cocaine trafficking alone. He pled guilty to 28 charges and was sentenced to 12 years in prison on 11 May 2001. On 18 January 2001, Réal "Tintin" Dupont of the Bandidos was shot dead in his car in Montreal. On 14 February 2001, another Bandido, Michel Gauthier, was found shot dead inside of his car in a forest north of Montreal.

Alain "Red Tomato" Brunette, the president of the Bandidos, refused an offer to switch sides as he told Detective Roberge: "They killed my friends, my brother bikers. And now they want to change sides? I'm not a prostitute". On 13 February 2001, Brunette was the victim of a murder attempt when his automobile was shot up while driving down a highway near Mirabel airport. Brunette's car took four bullets while he himself took two bullets to his chest. Despite bleeding badly, Brunette was able to reverse his car and sped away from his would-be killers. Brunette later plaintively appealed to the Hells Angels to stop their attacks, saying in a press conference: "We just want to live in peace".

Later in 2001, a Bandido, Eric "The Red" McMillan was beaten up by the Hells Angels in an Oshawa bar. McMillan was slashed with a knife from his chest to his belly, and almost bled to death.

=== Police raids ===
Shortly before his death, Kane had mentioned that a Rocker named Jean-Richard "Race" Larivière was the main man for handling cash payments, which led the Operation Carcajou detectives to focus on following him around. Police surveillance showed Larivière rented an apartment at 7415 Beaubien Street in the east end of Montreal, which he did not live in, but which received a steady stream of drug runners bringing bags to leave in unit 504. A man named Robert Gauthier would go to the unit 504 every Tuesday and Thursday to receive the drug runners. In September 2000, a Sûreté du Québec sergeant was able to install a camera inside apartment 504, which showed the drug runners were leaving money in unit 504 which was then transferred by Gauthier over to unit 403, which also had no tenant living in it, but did have two computers and a huge safe located in it. A man named Stéphane Chagnon would go to unit 403 every Tuesday and Thursday to count the money left by Gauthier and enter the amounts into the computers. Nothing was saved on the hard drive of the computers, but there were several disks on which were stored the financial records of the Nomads hidden under the carpet. The man in charge of the computer program at the Nomad "bank" was Richard Gemme, an insurance underwriter who was studying at Hautes Études Commerciales, the best business school in Quebec.

Surveillance showed the money collected at 7415 Beaubien Street every Tuesday and Thursday went to other apartments in Montreal to be counted. The Operation Carcajou squad discovered that there were counting machines in the apartments and the average box of cash that went out had $500,000 in it. A monthly average of $24 to $36 million went through what the police called the "Nomad National Bank" with financial records showing the "Nomad Bank" had in January 2001 $36 million in deposits and another $13.3 million in receivables. Despite the surveillance, the police never learned how the Hells Angels laundered their money. One Hells Angel took three boxes with $1.5 million in cash to the house of a prominent Montreal businessman and the police placed the house under surveillance, hoping to see where the money went. When a search was performed, the money was gone, making it mystery as to the cash was laundered in the "Maytag of the North" as the banking in Montreal was known to the police.

Commander Bouchard stated: "They had five money machines working twenty-four hours a day. They were taking out the cash, putting it on the table, flattening it out so it wouldn't get stuck and throwing it into these goddamn machines. It was almost like bubble gum to them. It was like a joke. They would laugh". On 24 January 2001, Sandra Craig turned herself in to the Operation Carcajou squad and gave the police the spreadsheets showing her and her late husband's dealings with the Hells Angels, which matched the records in the "Nomad Bank". Craig stated she and her husband had supplied 1,700 kilos of cocaine to the Hells Angels between 1998 and 2000. Every Hells Angel had a codename with the "Nomad Bank" with for instance Stadnick's codename being Gertrude and Carroll's codename being Renard. On 30 January 2001, the Operation Carcajou squad raided the locations of the "Nomad Bank", which the police seizing $5.6 million in cash.

In the meantime, Commander Bouchard had decided to investigate from another angle. Using the list of killers supplied by Kane as a list of suspects, Bouchard had the police gather up DNA evidence left by those named by Kane such as saliva found on discarded coffee cups or uneaten food in restaurants, which did not require a warrant. At the same time, Bouchard had two detectives, Louis-Marc Pelletier and Michel Tremblay, painstakingly go through all of the old evidence from unsolved murders such as hairs, skin flakes found on guns and discarded Kleenexes, and spit to see if there were any DNA samples that could be recovered. Pelletier and Tremblay were able to recover four samples of DNA from the old evidence and then using the DNA found from coffee cups and the like, were able to link four Hells Angels/Rockers, most notably Wooley to the murders. By February 2001, Bouchard's team had assembled enough evidence that they were prepared to lay 23 charges of murder, attempted murder, conspiracy to commit murder and gangsterism against 42 Hells Angels or Rockers.

On 15 February 2001, the police stormed into a Hells Angels meeting at the Holiday Inn in downtown Montreal. Found at the meeting were photographs of every single Bandido in Quebec plus their addresses and phone numbers. The Nomads attending the meeting were all armed. Serganet Thomas O'Neill of the RCMP stated: "We struck a gold mine when we went in there. This was amazing evidence for us". Sher and Marsden called the meeting "...a board meeting of Murder Incorporated lining up their next targets". However, to hide the coming Operation Springtime, the Crown made plea bargains with those arrested for weapons charges to avoid disclosing the evidence that led to the raid.

=== Operation Springtime ===
On 28 March 2001, in Operation Springtime, a joint investigation of the Hells Angels by the Royal Canadian Mounted Police, the Ontario Provincial Police, the Sûreté du Québec, and the Montreal police resulted in the arrests of Hells Angels all over Canada, with 138 being arrested in Quebec and 51 being arrested in Calgary on 30 March 2001. At about 4 am on the morning on 28 March, 2,000 police officers were assembled and sent out to arrest 128 Hells Angels and associates in Montreal. Arrested that day were 106 "full patch" Hells Angels, all of the Nomad chapter present in Montreal; all of the Rockers and all of the Evil Ones puppet gangs. When Hells Angels member Éric Bouffard was arrested on 28 March 2001, photos were found in his home showing José Théodore, the goalie for the Montreal Canadiens, partying with the Angels at their Montreal South clubhouse; it was also discovered that Bouffard had Théodore's cell phone number. The revelation that a popular hockey player like Théodore was a close friend of the Angels once again brought home how much the Angels had gone mainstream in Quebec, associating with celebrities from the world of the arts and sports. At the same time, it was revealed that several other members of the Théodore family had been arrested for loan sharking. Another arrested during the 2001 raids was the Montreal restaurateur Salvatore Brunnettii. The police found evidence that Brunnettii had between December 2000 and March 2001 laundered $70,000 in drug money for the Angels, while at Brunnettii's home the police found 3,000 US dollars and 10,000 Canadian dollars in his safe, along with an illegal .38 calibre handgun.

During their raids, the Sûreté du Québec arrested Charlebois at his estate outside of Montreal. Charlebois, who once been a petty criminal selling marijuana and smuggled cigarettes out of a cheap submarine sandwich restaurant in the east end of Montreal, was found to have $7,000 in cash and five $1,000 gambling chips from the Casino de Montréal at his estate together with a 1989 bottle of Château Haut-Brion worth $1,325 and a 1990 bottle of Château Lafite. Charlebois had risen rapidly after joining the Rockers, the Hells Angels, and the Nomads in succession during the 1990s. Charbebois, who liked to act like a tough guy, broke down in tears and immediately attempted to turn Crown's evidence when he was arrested by the Montreal police, saying he couldn't face going to prison for the rest of his life. Commander André Bouchard of the Montreal police bluntly told Charbebois "Fuck you, no deal for you" which caused him to cry even more. Of those arrested, only Wooley of the Rockers held up, refusing to say a word to the police. Bouchard stated that he felt that Wooley would try to make a plea bargain, saying: "We've got him cold and his lawyer knew it. We've got DNA. I mean, he was dead. What more do you need? Son of a bitch. He was the only one really who never even said a word".

To assist with gathering evidence, Bouchard wanted DNA samples, and was hoping that the accused would ask for food, coffee cups, cigarettes or Kleenex so he seize their saliva samples to run for DNA tests. One Angel told the police as he used a box of Kleenex: "If you think you can get my fucking DNA...you're a bunch of assholes!". As Bouchard picked up the used Kleenex to run for a DNA test, he later stated thinking at the time: "You look at these guys. They're not all the sharpest pencils". One Angel chose to eat his cigarettes to avoid giving saliva samples which could be run for DNA tests. One of the Angels who escaped arrest was Carroll; he fled to Mexico in March 2001 and has not been seen or heard from since. A police affidavit stated that Carroll had $1 million in a bank account in Antigua and it is believed that Carroll has gone to Brazil, which has no extradition treaty with Canada. In 2014, the Interpol website stated: "Hells Angels have chapters in more than 20 countries and information suggests that Carroll has frequented a number (of them) including Brazil, Mexico, Australia, New Zealand, South Africa, United States (as well as countries in South America and Europe)." Stadnick was arrested in Montego Bay in Jamaica, spending time in what his girlfriend called a "hellhole" Jamaican prison. Stadnick did not contest extradition back to Canada in April 2001.

=== Lekkes testifies for the Crown ===
In July 2001, Luis Elias Lekkes, the accountant for the Irish-Canadian gangster Gerry Matticks, the leader of the Irish West End Gang of Montreal, agreed to turn Crown's evidence after being arrested in March 2001. After attempting to kill himself in prison twice, saying he was convinced that the Hells Angels and/or the West End Gang had put out a jailhouse contract on his life, Lekkes agreed to testify for the Crown that the West End Gang controlled the port of Montreal, and in exchange for fees, allowed the Angels to smuggle all sorts of things both in and out of Montreal. After Matticks was arrested, at his bail hearing, the Roman Catholic priest for the parish of St. Bruno, Father Marc Mignault, testified to his good character, stating he was a devout Catholic who gave generously to Catholic charities and was one of Montreal's most honest and respectable businessman. Father Mignault in particular praised Matticks for donating thousands of chickens every Thanksgiving and Christmas to the poor of Montreal as evidence of his good heart. The Crown Attorney, Robert Rouleau, by contrast noted that at one of Matticks's businesses was found to have a paper hidden in a fridge bearing the names "Guy" and "Mom", next to which were written the cell phone numbers for Guy Lepage and Boucher. Lekkes signed a statement for the Crown stating that Matticks, who controlled the longshoreman's union at the Port of Montreal, had made profits of $22 million from smuggling drugs into the city and had sold the Angels at least 700 kilos of cocaine in the last two years. Lekkes later testified at other trials in 2002 and 2003 that he regularly took cardboard boxes containing about $500,000 in cash from the Hells Angels as payments to the West End Gang and that the chicken which Matticks was generous in donating to Catholic charities at Thanksgiving and Christmas times was stolen from container ships meant to export chicken to grocery stores in Europe. Inspired by Lekkes's example, John McLean, one of Mattick's lieutenants, agreed to turn Crown's evidence and to testify against Matticks's son Donald, in exchange for an 8-year prison sentence. Lekkes received a 7-year prison sentence with the promise that he would receive a new identity and police protection for the rest of his life when he was released, and as a result Matticks pleaded guilty in 2002 rather than face extradition to the United States, where he was wanted on charges of smuggling cocaine.

== 2002 - Boucher retried ==
In the spring of 2002, Boucher was again brought to trial for the murders of Lavigne and Rondeau after having been acquitted in 1998. The Crown challenged the verdict, citing irregular aspects of the trial that suggested intimidation of the part of the Hells Angels, and at the second trial, Gagne agreed to testify for the Crown in exchange for a lesser sentence. France Charbonneau, widely viewed as the toughest Crown Attorney in Quebec, was assigned to prosecute Boucher. Gagné testified that Boucher wanted random murders of people working for the Quebec justice system in order to create such a climate of fear that no one would ever dare prosecute the Hells Angels. The most damaging evidence came from beyond the grave as the reports that Kane had given to the RCMP between 1994 and 1997, and 1999 and 2000, were presented as Crown's evidence. Kane had stolen the financial records of the Nomads, which showed that over the course of an 8-month period in 2000, the Hells Angels had made a profit of $111,503,110 in Quebec. On 6 May 2002, Boucher was found guilty of two counts of first-degree murder and sentenced to life imprisonment with no chance of parole for the next 25 years. André Bouchard, a Montreal police detective, told the media it was rumored that the American leadership of the Hells Angels wanted Boucher dead, saying: "We've heard that they [the Hells Angels leadership] in the United States got together and they said to take the fucker out. They say this is the guy who caused all the trouble."

The Canadian scholar Stephen Schneider noted through Operation Springtime "hit the Hells Angels hard, the resilient motorcycle club quickly bounced back and even saw its membership increase". At the time of Operation Springtime in 2001, the Hells Angels in Quebec had 106 "full patch" members while by 2002 the number had risen to 124 "full patch" members. The arrest of every member of the Nomad chapter proved to be only an ephemeral blow only as the "drug trafficking network rebounded" as the Trois-Rivières chapter quickly replaced the Nomad chapter as the coordinating chapter.

The journalists Julien Sher and William Marsden noted that Operation Springtime was a heavy blow against the Hells Angels, but in no way crippled the group. Thomas O'Neill of the RCMP stated: "We didn't finish them off, but we set them back years". The police arrested 120 Hells Angels and Rockers in Operation Springtime, but only 60 were "full patch" Hell Angels with rest all being "prospects" or "hang-arounds", leaving 70 "full patch" Hells Angels free to continue to operate in Montreal. Almost every member of the elite Nomad chapter were arrested except for Carroll and André Chounaird, but no members of the Angels Sherbrooke, Sorel and St-Basile-le-Grand chapters were arrested. The Sherbrooke, St-Basile-le-Grand and Sorel chapters stepped in to fill the void caused by the arrests of the Nomad chapter.

=== Operation Amigo ===
The Bandidos Canada had been looking to take advantage of this opportunity to regain territory lost and take new territory from the Angels. However a concurrent investigation, Operation Amigo, was under way targeting the Bandidos operations in Quebec and Ontario (only the chapters that patched over from the Rock Machine). This operation had initially gone under a different title and was created to target the Rock Machine as a result of the conflict in Quebec; when the Rock Machine patched over to the Bandidos, they became the main focus.

On June 5, 2002, raids led to the arrests of 63 members of the Bandidos Canada (Rock Machine) including all of its Quebec members and many other associates. After Operation Amigo, the Bandidos had only 15 members left in Ontario. The Bandidos Canada themselves confirmed this in an official statement when they claimed that all chapters in Quebec had been frozen due to the members' imprisonment. Because the operation initially targeted the Rock Machine before the subsequent "patch-over", chapters that had joined from the Loner's motorcycle club were not included in the raids. Giovanni Muscedere became the new national president to replace the arrested Alain Brunette. In July 2003 Brunette promptly capitulated to an ultimatum from the Hells Angels, urging Muscedere to accede to their demands. In what Peter Edwards, the crime correspondent of the Toronto Star, called an "unconditional surrender", Brunette and Muscedere submitted to the demands of the Angels that the Bandidos would leave Quebec forever and that all of the imprisoned Bandidos would retire from organized crime forever in exchange for the imprisoned Bandidos not be murdered in prison. Muscedere denounced in public the Quebec Bandidos as "cowards" for accepting the deal that he submitted to and announced that henceforward the Bandidos would be focusing only on western Canada.

All in all, it is the deadliest recorded biker conflict, with at least 162 people dead, over 300 wounded, over 100 arrested, and 20 missing. It also cost the government of Canada and Quebec millions of dollars in damages with 84 bombings and 130 cases of arson.

== Aftermath ==
In April 2006, the Bandidos, the only possible rivals to the Hells Angels in Canada, self-destructed with the Shedden massacre, leaving the Angels as the only national outlaw biker club in Canada. On 1 October 2007, the Bandidos website announced: "As of October 2, 2007, the Bandidos MC 1% Canada is officially shut down. There isn't no more Bandidos MC membership in Canada". In April 2008, the former members of the Bandidos Winnipeg chapter started to call themselves the Rock Machine. However, besides for the same name and patch, there is no connection between the current Rock Machine and former Rock Machine and most of the current Rock Machine's chapters exist only on the internet. The journalist Jerry Langton wrote: "But while the Outlaws had been essentially reduced to a disparate band of gray-bearded men waiting for their court-ordered restrictions to expire and the amorphous Loners/Rock Machine/Bandidos entity seems to be a club on the internet only, the Hells Angels continue to groom new members and employ gangs of many different strips all over the country."

In May 2008, the career of the Canadian Foreign Minister Maxime Bernier was temporarily derailed when it emerged that his girlfriend Julie Couillard in 2007 was a former stripper who had been the sexual partner of several Hells Angels in the 1990s, forcing him to resign in June 2008. Bernier left behind a NATO briefing document at Couillard's house, and the media demanded his resignation, saying it was inappropriate for a cabinet minister to be seeing a woman who was once married to a Hells Angel and involved in a common-law relationship with another. L'affaire Bernier-Couillard almost destroyed Bernier's career, although it does not appear that national security was threatened in any serious way.

In April 2009, over 156 members of the Hells Angels were arrested in Quebec, New Brunswick, France and the Dominican Republic mostly in connection to crimes related to the biker war as part of Operation SharQc. The arrests led to charges for 22 murders committed between 1992 and 2009. Four Hells Angels bunkers were also seized by police including one in Sorel-Tracy that was firebombed in 2008. Dozens of arrests were previously made earlier in the year as part of Operation Axe in February and Operation Baladeur in March.

On 13 March 2014, Detective Roberge pleaded guilty in a Montreal courthouse to charges of breach of trust and of engaging in gangsterism. Roberge admitted to accepting $125,000 from the Hells Angels in exchange for information and was sentenced to 8 years in prison.

In October 2015, the charges against the Hells Angels arrested in Quebec in 2009 were dismissed following allegations that the Crown withheld evidence for too long, resulting in an internal investigation as to why the effort to convict the Hells Angels failed. Quebec Superior Court Judge James Brunton ruled that delay between the arrests in 2009 as part of Operation SharQc and 2015 violated the right to a speedy trial guaranteed by the Charter of Rights and Freedoms and dismissed all of the charges against the Hells Angels arrested as part of Operation SharQc.

In 2015, the Sûreté du Québec alleged in an indictment that Boucher had continued to engage in organized crime from his prison cell, using his daughter Alexandra Mongeau as his messenger, and that his principal surrogate in Montreal was his former bodyguard, Gregory Woolley, who has been charged three times with first-degree murder.

In 2016, a former RCMP officer and an expert on biker gangs, Pierre de Champlain, told the media: "Since 2000, the Hells Angels have had complete control over Quebec, from Sept-Iles to Granby. No one wants to work against the Hells Angels independently because it's not in their interest." Noting the funeral in Montreal in August 2016, of a biker killed in an automobile crash, Champlain noted it was attended by "...300 bikers but also 1,000 to 3,000 people who came out to watch. They wanted to see the parade, the coffin pulled by bikes. And we have to admit, it was spectacular."

== In popular culture ==
=== Television ===
==== Quebec Biker War (Canadian TV series) ====
A television show titled Quebec Biker War is in development as of May 2025. The scripted drama will depict events related to the Quebec Biker War, a violent conflict between rival outlaw motorcycle clubs in Canada during the 1990s and early 2000s. The TV series is based on Edward Winterhalder’s two-volume autobiography Searching For My Identity and his non-fiction book The Assimilation, co-authored with Canadian motosport journalist Wil De Clercq. Quebec Biker War is being developed with Bruce M. Smith serving as showrunner, Nick Copus attached as director, and John Gillespie, Mark Holdom, and Edward Winterhalder credited as executive producers.

==== L’Appel (Canadian TV series) ====
A limited television mini-series starring Vincent Graton as Maurice Boucher, Pier-Luc Funk as Stéphane Gagné, Magalie Lépine Blondeau, and Patrice Robitaille debuted in January 2025. Directed by Julie Perreault and written by Luc Dionne, the series depicts events that led to the arrest and conviction of Boucher during the Quebec Biker War.

== See also ==
- List of outlaw motorcycle club conflicts
