= Gérald Gallant =

Canadian contract killer

- Born: 5 May 1950 (age 76); Saguenay, Quebec, Canada
- Occupations: Armed robber, contract killer
- Years active: 1969–2006
- Known for: Hitman for the Rock Machine and the West End Gang
- Convictions: Theft (1969); Robbery (1970); Robbery (1974); Robbery (1980); Murder and attempted murder (2009)
- Penalty: 23 months' imprisonment (1969); 3 years' imprisonment (1970); 8 years' imprisonment (1974); 6 years' imprisonment (1980); Life imprisonment (2009)

Gérald Gallant (born 5 May 1950) is a Canadian contract killer who admitted to committing 28 murders and 12 attempted murders between 1978 and 2003. Gallant typically killed in public by gunshots to the head, neck or chest, which became his trademark. His victims were mostly members of Quebec-based criminal gangs. Gallant was reportedly one of Canada's most prolific known killers.

== Early life ==
The fourth of five children, Gallant was born in the Chicoutimi borough of Saguenay, Quebec and dropped out of school with a fifth-grade education. His father was a meek man who worked as a foreman at the Alcan aluminum smelter in Arvida, and his mother was a domineering woman who physically and psychologically abused Gallant. Gallant's mother was unfaithful to his father and, as a child, Gallant witnessed her infidelities with other men. He later described her as the person he "respects the least in (his) life." Gallant struggled with a stutter, which made him the object of mockery from his family, and suffered from a heart condition and rheumatism in one leg. When asked during a Sûreté du Québec polygraph test on 6 December 2008 what the most traumatic experience of his life was, Gallant responded: "My childhood". According to tests he was given while in custody at the Sainte-Anne-des-Plaines penitentiary in 1978, Gallant's intelligence quotient was estimated at 88; the prison's orienteer Jean Olczyk wrote that he "has an intellectual potential below average". Other tests that Gallant underwent in detention showed that he possessed "above-average dexterity and digital coordination" in addition to being "accurate, focused and meticulous".

An insecure and withdrawn teenager, Gallant became involved in petty crime in order to "feel accepted" by others. He joined a local gang, the Cossacks, with whom he began breaking and entering at grocery and convenience stores in the Saguenay–Lac-Saint-Jean region, stealing cigarettes and selling them onto a contact. Gallant also held various jobs, at a hotel in Chicoutimi, a Steinberg supermarket and as a peat installer. Although the minimum age for drivers' licenses in Quebec was 21 at the time, Gallant forged the birth date on his baptistery and fraudulently gained a driving licence at 18.

== Criminal career ==
=== Robber ===
Gallant was given his first custodial sentence on 27 October 1969, when he was sentenced to serve a 23-month term at Chicoutimi prison for a series of thefts. At the suggestion of other prisoners, he joined a gang of bank robbers after his release from custody in June 1970. 59 days after his release, Gallant was arrested for the robbery of the Credit Union of Chicoutimi-Nord with an accomplice, for which he was sentenced to three years' imprisonment. On 24 October 1973, he took part in a failed armed robbery of a jewelry store in Chicoutimi. Acting as the getaway driver, Gallant fled the scene after one of two accomplices, Gilles "Balloune" Côté, began shooting at police. Côté was arrested and incriminated Gallant, who later surrendered to police. He and Côté were housed in the same detention wing at Orsainville jail while awaiting trial. Fearing that Gallant would in turn inform on him, Côté attempted to kill Gallant, but succeeded only in choking him unconscious. In retaliation, Gallant circulated copies of statements that Côté had made to the police, exposing him as an informer to other inmates. Gallant pleaded guilty to the attempted robbery and was sentenced to eight years in prison on 14 June 1974. In 1975, Gallant began working for senior West End Gang member Raymond Desfossés, who he first met while they were incarcerated together at the Cowansville penitentiary. He smuggled narcotics at Cowansville for Desfossés, who controlled the prison's drug trade. Other gangsters who Gallant met at the penitentiary and who he later worked for or with were Denis Corriveau, who he described as a "great friend", Jean-Claude Gagné, and Raymond Bouchard, the West End Gang's lieutenant in the Quebec City area. He was paroled in September 1978 and lived in a mobile home in Port-Cartier with his wife Grassette and son, earning $260 per week as a tyre fitter. Gallant later admitted that he "pretended to be in love" with Grassette and stayed with her in order to avoid suspicion from probation authorities, although she described him as a "very good father" who "provided a lot of care and affection" according to a parole report. On 28 December 1978, Gallant committed his first murder when he helped a fellow former inmate, with whom he had served time at Saint-Vincent-de-Paul penitentiary, kill dancers' bar employee Gilles Legris, who had allegedly assaulted a female, in Port-Cartier. Legris was beaten to death with iron bars and his body was thrown from a dam in Sept-Îles. Gallant was taken under the wing of Desfossés, for whom he led a hashish trafficking ring and performed his first contract killing on 30 January 1980. His victim in this case was Louis Desjardins, a drug dealer in significant debt to the West End Gang who Desfossés suspected of cooperating with police. Desjardins was lured to a tyre garage owned by Gallant in Port-Cartier, where he was shot in the head. With the help of his brother-in-law Denis Gaudreault, Gallant transported Desjardins' body in the trunk of Desjardins' Ford Thunderbird to a precipice near Baie-Comeau, where it was disposed of. Desjardins' corpse was discovered in a ravine weeks later.

On 28 August 1980, Gallant and two accomplices robbed the Credit Union of Sainte-Marguerite in Trois-Rivières of $169,000. He was arrested for the crime shortly afterwards, and was sentenced to six years' imprisonment on 5 December 1980. In exchange for a reduced sentence, Gallant became an informer for the Sûreté du Québec, with officer André Hardy acting as his handler. Hardy used Gallant for several years to obtain information about Raymond Desfossés' organization, and a number of Desfossés' underlings were arrested as a result, including Gérard "Maggy" Hubert, with whom Gallant committed a $125,000 bank robbery in Vancouver in 1985. Gallant was paid $45,000 by the police for the information he provided. Hubert, a hairdresser from Cap-de-la-Madeleine who Gallant referred to as his "Siamese twin", would later assist Gallant in eight murders.

=== Contract killer ===
Gallant continued his career as a killer-for-hire while working as a police informer, performing a contract roughly once every two years throughout the 1980s and 1990s, for which he was usually paid $10,000 to $12,000 per murder. His next hit took place in the fall of 1982, when he shot and killed André Haince near Quebec City, for which he received $3,000 from massage parlour owner Marcel Lefrançois and $5,000 from Desfossés. Gallant and Desfossés were among a dozen suspects in the killing of Haince, and Gallant was questioned by Sûreté du Québec agent Georges Richard on 15 December 1982. Although Gallant categorically denied his involvement in the crime, he claimed that a relative of Desfossés had told him that "the job was done by two guys, one from Trois-Rivières and one from Montreal". The police investigation ultimately did not lead to any arrests due to a lack of evidence. On 16 February 1984, Gallant mortally wounded Lefrançois by shooting him in the head with a Browning Auto-5 shotgun in a drive-by shooting in Sainte-Foy, and Lefrançois died in hospital three days later. Lefrançois had refused to pay Gallant an outstanding $12,000 fee for the contract killing of Haince, who was executed two years earlier. Although Desfossés did not order the hit, he provided a driver, Réjean-Claude Juneau, for the murder. In one instance in October 1985, Gallant refused to kill a target because he had a child with him, although he and accomplice Philippe Côte fatally shot Gilles Côté the following day when the child was absent. Gilles Côté was targeted in retaliation for informing on Gallant twelve years earlier after a bungled robbery. Another intended target of the shooting, Michel Robitaille, escaped unharmed. An autopsy of Côté found that he had been shot approximately thirty times with a 12 mm caliber rifle and at least three times with a .455 caliber revolver.

On 28 May 1990, Gallant fatally shot strip club owner Salvatore Luzi in the backyard of his Norman-style house in Lorraine in a $10,000 contract given by Raymond Desfossés. Gallant gained entry to the residence, which was up for sale for $360,000, by pretending to be a potential buyer and then shot Luzi while he was being given a tour of the property. Shot three times in the head with a .22 caliber revolver, Luzi succumbed to his wounds three days later. Police believe the motive for the killing involved money lost in the Million Dollar Night Club, a Montreal strip club, by West End Gang leader Allan "The Weasel" Ross, who co-owned the club with Luzi. Ross reportedly suspected Luzi of skimming profits from the business. The following year, Gallant assassinated West End Gang associate Richard "Ricky" McGurnaghan at the Olympic Tavern in Pointe-Saint-Charles in exchange for $12,000 from Desfossés after McGurnaghan was involved in a physical confrontation with Ross. Like in the Gilles Côté hit, Gallant was initially forced to delay the killing as McGurnaghan frequently patronized the tavern while in the company of a young boy.

Gallant was paid an additional $9,500 by the Sûreté du Québec in 1990 for acting as an informer. With this payment, he bought a Chrysler New Yorker, a car that he used in several murders. Aside from André Hardy, Gallant also provided information to other police officers, including Mario Laprise, who became chief of the Sûreté du Québec in 2012. He continued working as a police informer until 1992. In between hits, Gallant resided in Donnacona, where he lived with his second wife Claudine Bertrand after leaving his first wife and son. He worked as a butcher in a grocery store in Portneuf. Gallant kept a low profile and was an avid cyclist, a hobby he took up to strengthen his weak heart. In the spring of 1992, he suffered a heart attack and required bypass surgery. Although Gallant initially considered his career as a hitman finished due to his ill health, he eventually recovered and he committed four murders between March and August 1993. He became known as an extremely meticulous and confident killer, often spending several days monitoring his targets before determining the least risky place to attack, and always planning an escape route in order to flee without being apprehended. Gallant drove his Chrysler to and from numerous murders, using only stolen license plates, which were placed over his own using "big jumbo paper clips". He typically used .357 Magnum or .38 Special calibre firearms, which he discarded at the scene. According to the investigator Claude St-Cyr, much of Gallant's modus operandi was devised from a book he read about a New York City Mafia hitman.

=== Quebec Biker War ===
Gallant's activity peaked during the Quebec Biker War, which resulted in the deaths of over 160 people between 1994 and 2002. During this period, he began killing for the Rock Machine, the Montreal Mafia, and the Bertrand and Pelletier clans. Gallant frequently met with Frédéric Faucher and Marcel "Le Maire" Demers, the leaders of the Rock Machine in the Quebec City area, at the Basilica of Sainte-Anne-de-Beaupré to receive murder contracts as well as weapons and ammunition. Faucher hired Gallant to carry out seven murders between 1995 and 2001. Following the killing of Bruno "Cowboy" Van Lerberghe, a member of the Hells Angels' Quebec City chapter who Gallant shot at a restaurant on 17 December 1996, Gallant was offered full membership in the Rock Machine, an invitation he declined. On 8 April 1997, he fatally shot hotel manager Denis Lavallée in his office at the Donnacona Hotel. Lavallée's murder was ordered as he had permitted only the Hells Angels to sell drugs in his establishment. Because the killing took place in Donnacona, the city where Gallant resided, he took extra precautions to avoid suspicion, leaving an oversized item of footwear at the scene to confuse police. Between 1995 or 1996 and November 2002, Gallant was involved in an extramarital affair with Jacqueline Benoît, whom he first met as a cycling partner. Benoît worked in her family's business, an ambulance service and a funeral home in Donnacona, and she assisted Gallant with surveillance and logistical support in three murder contracts, the first of which was the failed assassination of Louis "Mélou" Roy, the second-in-command of the Hells Angels' elite Nomads chapter, on 23 August 1997. Gallant shot and wounded Roy in the chest in the parking lot of his parents' motel in Jonquière, where Roy resided. As Roy had been able to evade numerous gunshots, Gallant ran out of ammunition before he could kill his target and he subsequently fled the scene. Despite failing to kill Roy, Gallant was paid $20,000 by Demers nonetheless. He next killed Alain "Lulu" Leclerc, a drug dealer and Hells Angels associate, shooting Leclerc as he dined with his wife at a Charlesbourg restaurant on 17 November 1997. The murder of Leclerc was carried out on behalf of Raymond Bouchard of the West End Gang. Gérard Hubert accompanied Gallant during the hit, disguised as a woman.

In 1998, Gallant's most prolific year as a hitman, he killed five men, including Paolo "Paul" Cotroni, the son of deposed Cotroni crime family boss Frank Cotroni. Cotroni had been dealing with the Hells Angels. Gallant and Gérard Hubert received $20,000 from Marcel Demers for his assassination. Jacqueline Benoît was an accomplice in two of Gallant's killings that year, those of Quebec City Hells Angels associates Alain Bouchard and Pierre "Pete" Simard, who were murdered under contract from Raymond Bouchard. Gallant paid Benoît "a few thousand dollars" as a reward for her assistance. On 7 January 1999, he fatally shot Luc Bergeron, a private detective who happened to be living in an apartment in Sainte-Foy formerly occupied by his intended target, Quebec City Hells Angels chapter member Jonathan Robert. Gallant held Demers responsible for the mistake as Demers had provided him with the license plate of Bergeron's vehicle rather than that of Robert's, and he collected a $20,000 fee from the Rock Machine for the botched assassination.

In the summer of 2000, Gallant was offered $250,000 by Raymond Desfossés, who had aligned himself with the Rock Machine, to kill Hells Angels leader Maurice "Mom" Boucher. He was also given a $10,000 advance payment by Marcel Demers for the job. While carrying out surveillance on Boucher, Gallant passed "about a foot" from his target on Saint Catherine Street in downtown Montreal, where Boucher frequented a hair salon. Gallant was unarmed at the time and Boucher was flanked by two bodyguards, however. The planned hit was ultimately called off because of the intense police surveillance Boucher was under at the time. During the 7 July 2000 assassination of Robert "Bob" Savard, a loan shark and right-hand man to Boucher, by Gallant and Gérard Hubert at a restaurant in Montréal-Nord, an associate of Savard, hockey player-turned-loan shark Norm Descôteaux, and a waitress, Hélène Brunet, were also shot and wounded by Gallant and Hubert after Descôteaux used Brunet as a human shield. Brunet, who survived being shot four times in the arm and leg, subsequently became an outspoken critic of gangs. Gallant later expressed remorse for her shooting.

=== Project Baladeur ===
On 30 May 2001, Gallant killed bar manager Yvon Daigneault and wounded patron Michel Paquette in a case of mistaken identity in Sainte-Adèle. According to Gallant, the actual target was Claude Faber, a former associate of the West End Gang who owed $250,000 to Raymond Desfossés. Desfossés supplied Gallant with the wrong licence plate number while providing instructions for the hit, however. Gallant left his DNA on a beer bottle recovered by police at the crime scene, an error which was pivotal to the police in launching Project Baladeur, an investigation that revealed Gallant killed 28 people in all. His last murder, of Quebec City drug dealer Christian "Le Prince" Duchaîne, was committed on 12 March 2003. Duchaîne's brother, Bertrand, has survived two murder attempts by Gallant, in 1990 and 1993, and Gallant was informed by West End Gang member Raymond Bouchard, with who Gallant was involved in 16 murder contracts, that Duchaîne wanted to kill Gallant as well as his boss, Desfossés. With the assistance of Duchaîne's uncle, West End Gang associate Jean-Claude Gagné, Duchaîne was lured to Bouchard's garage in Beauport and shot dead by Gallant. His corpse was then taken to a garage in Sainte-Hélène-de-Breakeyville owned by Denis Corriveau, who dismembered the body. Duchaîne's remains were then incinerated, and the ashes were disposed of "in an empty gallon of paint", which Gallant and Corriveau filled with tar.

Gallant fled to Switzerland in 2006 after he began to suspect that police were investigating him. He was apprehended in Geneva on 5 May 2006, his 56th birthday, by Swiss police, who arrested him for credit card fraud. He had accumulated $400,000 by selling high-end watches on the black market, and had scammed jewelry stores out of approximately $250,000 by using forged credit cards. Investigators from the Sûreté du Québec and the Service de police de la Ville de Québec first met with Gallant in Geneva on 4 July 2006. During the interrogation, he admitted to the murders in Canada and was quickly extradited. After his arrest, Gallant turned Crown witness, providing information that led to the arrest of eleven others involved in the murders and attempted murders. In March 2009, he accepted a plea deal from Canadian authorities and pleaded guilty to 27 murders and 12 attempted murders. He received 48 life sentences with no eligibility for parole until 2033. All eleven co-conspirators, including the crime bosses Desfossés, Fred Faucher and Marcel Demers, pleaded guilty to their roles Gallant's killings.

== Legacy ==
The journalist Michel Auger said of Gallant: "He was the killer next door who looked like a parish priest, who was careful what he ate and got a lot of exercise... He was a guy with a lot of technique and a good memory. He could spend hours doing surveillance on his victims, but he made mistakes". He was the subject of Gallant: confessions d’un tueur à gages, a 2015 non-fiction book written by Éric Thibault and Félix Séguin. The book was adapted by director Luc Picard and screenwriter Sylvain Guy for the 2021 film Confessions of a Hitman, starring Picard as Gallant.

== List of murders committed by Gallant ==
Name	Date	Notes
Gilles Legris	28 December 1978	Legris was beaten to death with iron bars by Gallant and another man in Port-Cartier over a dispute involving a woman.
Louis Desjardins	30 January 1980	Desjardins, a drug dealer and suspected police informer, was shot by Gallant at a tyre garage in Port-Cartier on the order of West End Gang member Raymond Desfossés. Denis Gaudreault acted as an accomplice.
André Haince	27 September 1982	Haince was killed by Gallant in Lévis at the request of Marcel Lefrançois. After going missing from his home in Vanier, Haince's corpse was discovered buried in a clearing in Saint-Romuald in 1986. Gilles Dubois was an accomplice.
Marcel Lefrançois	16 February 1984	Lefrançois was fatally wounded by Gallant in a drive-by shooting in Sainte-Foy on 16 February 1984 and died in hospital on 19 February after he refused to pay Gallant for the contract killing of André Haince. Réjean-Claude Juneau served as an accomplice.
Gilles Côté	23 October 1985	Côté was shot in Charlesbourg by Gallant and accomplice Philippe Côte while in the company of Michel Robitaille, another intended target of the shooting. Gilles Côté had incriminated Gallant in a 1973 robbery.
Guy Laflamme	5 October 1989	Laflamme was shot by Gallant in a restaurant parking lot in Vanier. He had been due to testify against two individuals.
Salvatore Luzi	28 May 1990	Luzi, who co-owned a Montreal strip club along with West End Gang leader Allan Ross, was shot in Lorraine in a contract given by Raymond Desfossés, allegedly on behalf of Ross. Ross had suspected Luzi of stealing from him.
Richard McGurnaghan	18 March 1991	Gallant gunned down West End Gang associate McGurnaghan in a Pointe-Saint-Charles tavern in exchange for $12,000 from Raymond Desfossés. McGurnaghan was ordered killed as a result of a personal feud he had with Allan Ross.
Pierre Langlois	8 February 1993	Pub owner Langlois was shot by Gallant outside his apartment in Charlesbourg over unpaid debts.
Daniel Paquet	27 July 1993	Pacquet was shot by Gallant in front of an ice cream parlour in La Cité-Limoilou.
Guy Laflamme	2 August 1994	Gallant shot Guy "Bretzel" Laflamme in a Beauport bar. Jean-Claude Gagné was an accomplice.
Guy Lévesque	14 April 1995	Lévesque was shot by Gallant in his car in Saint-Antoine-de-Tilly. Denis Corriveau was an accomplice in the murder.
Bruno Van Lerberghe	17 December 1996	Gallant shot Hells Angels member Van Lerberghe in a Quebec City restaurant.
Denis Lavallée	8 April 1997	Hotel manager Lavallée was shot by Gallant in his office in Donnacona at the request of Rock Machine member Frédéric Faucher as he permitted only the Hells Angels to sell drugs in his establishment.
Alain Leclerc	17 November 1997	Hells Angels associate Leclerc was shot dead in a restaurant in Charlesbourg at the behest of from West End Gang member Raymond Bouchard.
Alain Bouchard	10 February 1998	Bouchard, a drug trafficker and Hells Angels associate, was killed by Gallant in a bar in Saint-Roch. Raymond Bouchard ordered the killing and Jacqueline Benoît served as an accomplice.
Roland Ruel	2 April 1998	Ruel was shot by Gallant in a restaurant in Beauport.
Richard Drouin	16 June 1998	Drouin, a former stock car racer, was shot by Gallant as he returned to his home in L'Ancienne-Lorette.
Paolo Cotrini	24 August 1998	Cotroni, the son of Mafia boss Frank Cotroni, was shot by Gallant and Gérard Hubert outside his home in Repentigny. Rock Machine member Marcel Demers paid Gallant $20,000 for the assassination.
Pierre Simard	8 September 1998	Simard, an associate of the Quebec City Hells Angels, was shot five times in the head as he left his girlfriend's apartment in La Cité-Limoilou. Jacqueline Benoît provided assistance in the killing.
Luc Bergeron	9 January 1999	Private detective Bergeron was shot outside his residence in Sainte-Foy after he was mistaken for Hells Angels member Jonathan Robert. Marcel Demers had ordered the killing of Robert. Gérard Hubert was an accomplice in the murder.
Yves Lessard	22 April 1999	Drug dealer Lessard was shot by Gallant at a shopping center in Sainte-Foy under contract from Raymond Bouchard.
Yves Vermette	23 October 1999	Vermette was shot by Gallant while working in his bar in Beauport.
Israel Meyer Randolph	27 January 2000	Gallant shot Randolph in a restaurant in Snowdon.
Jean-Marc Savard	1 March 2000	Savard was killed by Gallant in Charlesbourg.
Robert Savard	7 July 2000	Hells Angels associate Savard was shot dead in a restaurant in Montréal-Nord as he dined with fellow loanshark Norm Descôteaux. Descôteaux and waitress Hélène Brunet were wounded by gunfire. Gérard Hubert was Gallant's accomplice.
Yvon Daigneault	30 May 2001	Bar manager Daigneault was shot several times while working in Sainte-Adèle when he was mistaken for West End Gang associate Claude Faber. Michel Paquette was also wounded in the shooting. Raymond Desfossés had ordered the killing of Faber.
Christian Duchaîne	12 March 2003	Duchaîne was lured to a garage in Beauport and shot by Gallant after he reportedly threatened the lives of Gallant and Raymond Desfossés. His corpse was then dismembered by Denis Corriveau and incinerated. Raymond Bouchard and Jean-Claude Gagné were accomplices.
