= Operation Axe =

- Date: February 12, 2009
- Location: Canada
- Type: Sting operation, Law enforcement raid
- Cause: Investigation into The Syndicate gang's drug trafficking activities.
- Target: Syndicate gang, associated with the Hells Angels.
- Organised by: Montreal Police; Royal Canadian Mounted Police
- Participants: 700 police officers
- Outcome: Arrests of 47 individuals, seizure of drugs, weapons, and cash.
- Arrests: 47
- Accused: Gregory Woolley, Dany Cadet-Sprinces, Jean Lavertue, Emmanuel Zephir, Curtis Rodney, Roberto Sauro, Nelio Timothée, Emmanuel Grandma, Igor Vasiliev, Pasquale Mangiola, Fernand Lauzon, Nancy Lauzon, Stéphane Lavertue, Martin Lavertue, Patrick Lavertue.
- Charges: Gangsterism, arms possession, cocaine trafficking, crack production, conspiracy to import cocaine.

Operation Axe was a joint task force conducted on February 12, 2009, where 500 Montreal police and 200 Royal Canadian Mounted Police officers took part in a sting operation. It began its investigation in January 2006, aimed at raiding The Syndicate (formerly known as the Crack Down Posse); a major street gang of Haitian immigrants headed by Gregory "Pissaro" Wooley that is loyal to the Hells Angels. Wooley had once served as the bodyguard to the Hells Angel Quebec president Maurice "Mom" Boucher, and is a member of the Rockers, the Angels' puppet club in Montreal. As a black man, Wooley can never hope to graduate up from the Rockers to join the Angels, whom only accept white men, but he has been described as very loyal to the Angels. The raids took place in Montreal, Laval and Longueuil in Quebec, and Ottawa and Kingston in Ontario.

Items seized included 11 kg of hashish, 41 kg of cocaine, 2,300 crack rocks, 225 kg of marijuana, mix match of pills including speed, viagra, and ecstasy, computers and other electronic devices, Kevlar vests, $60,000 cash and 25 weapons and ammunition.

== Background ==
Operation Axe was one of the biggest sting operations in Montreal and was aimed at smaller groups associated with major organized crime groups like the Hells Angels. Montreal is no stranger to the impact the Hells Angels has on a city; during the 90's the gang took part in a major turf war for drugs on the streets of Montreal which has now been deemed the Quebec Biker war. This operation mirrored the premise of attacking the gangs drug trafficking system which was bringing in hundreds of thousands of dollars in revenue weekly, it was the belief of the police force that damaging that income would not destroy the group, however it would provide them with a major setback. A similar operation attacking the cocaine traffickers in Quebec happened in 2001, Operation Axe was another hit towards those groups who had rejuvenated their organizations since the last raids.

== Arrests ==
During the raid over 60 arrest warrants were issues but only 47 people were found, arrested, and charged with multiple offences. Some of the more interesting arrests included two men who were already in prison and a Canadian professional weightlifter.

Gregory Woolley, 36; was arrested in Kingston Prison. He was in the process of serving a 4.5 years sentence for illegal events he perpetrated during the Quebec Biker war. During the raid he was charged and arrested for receiving money for the royalties of selling drugs from his gang. First ever Canadian charged with Gangsterism twice.

Dany Cadet-Sprinces 38; Arrested in The Institute Leclerc in Quebec. He was seen as the second in command and was in the process of serving 4 years in prison for drug trafficking and gangsterism.

Jean Lavertue 35, A former Canadian Olympic weightlifter was charged of multiple charges including drug trafficking and gangsterism.

Others arrests included:

Emmanuel "Mano" Zephir, 36 Curtis Rodney, 36, Roberto Sauro, 30 Nelio Timothée, 34, Emmanuel Grandma, 23, Igor Vasiliev, 60, Pasquale Mangiola, 40, Rodney Curtis, 36, Fernand and Nancy Lauzon Pasquale Mangiola, 38 Stéphane Lavertue 33, Martin Lavertue 40, Patrick Lavertue 31.

== Charges laid ==
The exact counts of the charges are unknown to the public however these are the base charges that were given in a statement:

- Gangsterism: Sec 467.1 Criminal Code
- Arms Possession
- Trafficking Cocaine
- Production of crack
- Conspiring to import Cocaine
