= Serge Quesnel =

Canadian gangster and contract killer (born 1970)

- Born: 1970 (age 55–56); Trois-Rivières, Quebec, Canada
- Occupation: Gangster
- Known for: Contract killer for the Hells Angels
- Convictions: Theft (1989); Drug offence (1993); Murder (1995)
- Penalty: 2 years' imprisonment (1989); 20 years' imprisonment (1995)

Serge Quesnel (born 1970) is a Canadian gangster best known for his work as a hitman for the Hells Angels Motorcycle Club. Quesnel turned Crown's evidence in 1995 and testified against several Hells Angels members in exchange for a lesser sentence in five contract killings he performed for the club.

== Early life ==
Quesnel was born in Trois-Rivières and dropped out of high school. Quesnel only had one legitimate job in his entire life, working as a cook in a fast food restaurant, which he held for all of two weeks. He began his criminal career as a professional shoplifter as a teenager before moving on to engaging in armed robbery and drug trafficking. Quesnel worked as an enforcer and debt collector for the local drug dealers, enjoying some success as he was physically very strong. His most notable feature were the two tattoos of teardrops under each of his eyes. In 1989, when he was convicted of theft and sentenced to two years in prison, Quesnel demanded that he serve his sentence at a federal prison rather than a provincial prison, feeling he would be able to make more underworld contacts in a federal prison. Quesnel's request was granted and he served his sentence at the federal Donnaconna prison outside of Quebec City, where he was able to make contacts with "teachers" who gave him the underworld connections that he craved.

Feeling that his reputation within the underworld would be improved if he committed a murder, on 9 September 1993, Quesnel together with his associate Eric "Nose" Fournier murdered a drug dealer named Richard Jobin. On 20 October 1993, Quesnel and Fournier decided to murder an automobile mechanic and part-time drug dealer named Martin Naud, whom Quesnel believed knew too much about Jobin's murder. Quesnel and Fournier broke into Naud's house. Fournier tied a shoe lace around Naud's neck while Quesnel rammed a pair of scissors into one of Naud's eyes to immobilize him. Quesnel then used the scissors to cut open Naud's throat, causing him to bleed to death. Afterwards, Quesnel and Fournier doused Naud's body in alcohol and set it afire. The murders improved Quesnel's underworld reputation as intended.

== Hells Angels ==
In late 1993, Quesnel was imprisoned for a drug offense. During his time at Donnacona prison, Quesnel worked as an enforcer for the more well-off prisoners who beat bloody other prisoners on behalf of his employers. Quesnel's lawyer introduced him to the Hells Angels, saying that the Angels were looking for men like him. In November 1994, upon his release from prison, Quesnel met Louis "Mélou" Roy, the president of the Trois-Rivières chapter of the Hells Angels. Roy hired Quesnel as a hitman, saying he would receive a weekly salary of $500 in cash and between $10,000 to $25,000 per murder depending upon the degree of risk. Quesnel immediately accepted Roy's offer. Quesnel stated in his memoirs: "Mélou was the richest Angel in Quebec, and I was his protégé. We travelled together, and I could see that he was among the most powerful members of the 'profession'. He carried a booklet with the names, addresses, license plate numbers and descriptions of fifty or so undesirable individuals. When I saw it, I realized that the Trois-Rivières Hells Angles were very powerful".

On 14 December 1994, Quesnel was called by Sylvain "Baptise" Thiffault, the vice-president of Trois-Rivières chapter, who gave him his first assignment. Quesnel was to kill Jacques Ferland, a Quebec City chemist who worked for the Rock Machine gang. Ferland used his chemical knowledge to make PCPs for the Rock Machine. As Ferland had no bodyguards, he was considered an easy target, and Quesnel was to receive $10,000 for killing him. To assist him, Thiffault provided as much information as possible about Ferland, such as his home address, place of work, and his favorite restaurants. On 30 January 1995, Quesnel was able to enter Ferland's house by telling his friend, André Bedard, that he wanted to see him. Bedard let Quesnel into Ferland's residence, said he had a visitor and as Ferland walked down the stairs to see his guest, Quesnel pulled out a handgun and shot Ferland in the head. Waiting for Quesnel on the street as the getaway car driver was Michel "Pit" Caron, a member of the Mercenaries, a puppet club for the Hells Angels.

Impressed, the Hells Angels gave Quesnel another contract to kill Claude "Le Pic" Rivard, a Montreal drug dealer who worked the Pelletier clan who were allied to the Rock Machine. On 3 February 1995, Quesnel followed Rivard's car down the streets of Montreal and when Rivard stopped for a red light, Quesnel pulled up his vehicle next to Rivard's car. Quesnel then pulled out a handgun and shot Rivard in the head. A police car happened to be present, and a wild car chase followed as the police car chased after Quesnel's car. Eventually, Quesnel abandoned his car and escaped via foot. Quesnel's next contract was to kill Richard "Chico" Delcourt, a Montreal drug dealer who worked independently, buying his drugs from neither the Rock Machine nor the Hells Angels. Quesnel was able to approach Delcourt and hinted to him the Angels were looking to make him into a member. Quesnel offered to drive Delcourt to an Angels party in Quebec City, an offer that he accepted. On 23 March 1995, Quesnel and Delcourt were halfway to Quebec City when Quesnel turned his car onto a remote rural road. After stopping, Quesnel pulled out a .357 Magnum handgun and shot Delcourt in the head.

Quesnel's next contract was to kill Gilles Lambert, one of the leaders of the Rock Machine, for which he was promised $50,000 in cash. Before Quesnel could make the attempt, Caron turned police informer and told the police about Quesnel's role in the Ferland murder. On 1 April 1995, Quesnel was arrested and charged with first-degree murder.

== Informer ==
After his arrest, Quesnel turned Crown's evidence in exchange for a lesser sentence. Quesnel testified in 1997 that he turned Crown's evidence in 1995 because: "I saw that they had me". In exchange for testifying against Roy, Quesnel was to serve 20 years in prison for all five murders and to be eligible for parole after 12 years. In addition, the Crown paid Quesnel some $350,000 in exchange for his testimony and agreed to give him a new identity when he was released on parole. By 1995, the Crown were so desperate to recruit a Hells Angel as an informer in order to end the Quebec biker war that the police and prosecutors largely gave Quesnel most of what he wanted. As a result of Quesnel's statements, 13 Hells Angels including Roy were arrested and charged with murder. Fearing that Quesnel's life would be in danger if he was sent to prison, the Sûreté du Québec held Quesnel alone in a jail in Quebec City. Quesnel's girlfriend, a 21-year old stripper named Sandra Beaulieu, was allowed to have sex with him in his cell. Bealieu took what were described as "risqué" photographs of herself with Quesnel in his jail cell.

Martin Tremblay, a lawyer for the Hells Angels, was able to obtain Beaulieu's photographs alongside an affidavit by her stating she regularly had sex with Quesnel in his jail cell and that he was allowed to drink and consume various illegal drugs as a ward of the Crown. Tremblay mailed the photographs and the affidavit to various newspapers. Tremblay also pointed out that under the Crown's plea bargain with Quesnel, he was not to commit any more offenses, but that according to Beaulieu, she had smuggled the PCPs into the jail for him, thereby making him guilty of conspiracy to smuggle illegal drugs. The revelation that a man who had committed five murders was being treated very leniently by the police led to a firestorm of criticism of the police. Le Soleil newspaper ran a front-page photograph of Quesnel frolicking with a barely-dressed Bealieu in his jail cell. The Canadian Press reported at the time: "A police station has turned into a pleasure palace for a key witness in a Hells Angel trial who has taken drugs and had sex with his girlfriend while under police protection".

Quesnel invested his $300,000 cash payments and estimated in 1999 that he owned stocks worth about $1 million. In addition, Quesnel was allowed to keep the $10,000 worth of stolen jewelry that he had with him at the time of his arrest. The two police officers who allowed Quesnel to repeatedly have sex with Bealieu in his jail cell were reprimanded. The officers were not reprimanded for allowing Bealieu to smuggle in the PCPs because they had no authority to search her and she stated she had hidden the PCPs inside of her vagina during her visits to Quesnel's jail cell between 11 April and 22 May 1995. On 19 July 1995, Quesnel made a plea bargain to pled guilty to conspiracy to traffic in PCPs and despite the way he violated his first plea bargain by committing more crimes, the Crown still struck with the terms of the first plea bargain.

At Roy's trial for murder in April 1997, Quesnel testified for the Crown. The jury found Quesnel to be an untrustworthy witness and acquitted Roy. As a witness for the Crown, Quesnel proved to be unsatisfactory in the 1990s and all those he testified against were acquitted. Quesnel provided information to the police about the murder of an American named Lee Carter, who had been killed on 29 July 1993 by a bomb planted in his car. According to Quesnel, Carter had been working with a Hells Angel, Richard Vallée, in smuggling drugs across the American-Canadian border as Carter had helped Vallée smuggle some 54 kilograms of cocaine into Canada in 1992. Quesnel stated that Vallée had killed Carter after he discovered that he was working as an agent for the New York State Police and the U.S. Customs.

In 2002, Quesnel had the journalist Pierre Martineau serve as the ghostwriter for his memoirs, Testament d’un tueur des Hells. In 2003, the memoirs were translated into English as I Was a Killer for the Hells Angels: The True Story of Serge Quesnel. In 2004, Quesnel sued the Crown, arguing that conditions in prison were too harsh for him. In 2009, the case was decided in Quesnel's favor. In 2011, Quesnel received day parole. In 2013, Quesnel's parole was revoked when it was discovered that he had violated his parole conditions by drinking. On 24 November 2015, Quesnel was released from prison on full parole.

== Books ==
- Auger, Michel; Edwards, Peter (2012). The Encyclopedia of Canadian Organized Crime: From Captain Kidd to Mom Boucher. Toronto: McClelland & Stewart. ISBN 978-0771030499.
- Cherry, Paul (2005). The Biker Trials: Bringing Down the Hells Angels. ECW Press. ISBN 9781554902507.
- Langton, Jerry (2006). Fallen Angel The Unlikely Rise of Walter Standick in the Canadian Hells Angels. Toronto: John Wiley & Sons. ISBN 144342773X.
- Lavigne, Yves (1999). Hells Angels at War. Toronto: HarperCollins. ISBN 9780002000246.
- Schneider, Stephen (2009). Iced: The Story of Organized Crime in Canada (2nd ed.). Toronto: John Wiley & Sons. ISBN 978-0470835005.
