= Richard Vallée =

Canadian outlaw biker and gangster (born 1957)

- Born: 10 November 1957 (age 69); Trois-Rivières, Quebec, Canada
- Other name: "Rick"
- Occupations: Outlaw biker, gangster
- Allegiance: Satan's Guard MC (–1991); Hells Angels MC (1991–)
- Convictions: Operating a brothel (1988); First-degree murder (2007)
- Penalty: Life imprisonment without parole (2008)

Richard Vallée (born 10 November 1957) is a Canadian outlaw biker and gangster. A drug trafficker and member of the Hells Angels Motorcycle Club, Vallée was extradited to the United States and sentenced to life imprisonment in 2007 for the 1993 car bomb murder of New York State Police drug informant Lee Carter.

== Criminal career ==
=== Outlaw biker ===
Born in Trois-Rivières, as a young man Vallée joined the Satan's Guard outlaw biker gang led by Louis "Mélou" Roy. Vallée began his criminal career working as a pimp, and in 1988, he was charged with operating a brothel, which he pleaded guilty to on 30 November 1988. The Satan's Guard gang "patched over" to join the Hells Angels on 14 June 1991. Vallée was very close to Roy, who became the president of the Hells Angels' Trois-Rivières chapter. On 22 May 1992, Vallée was acquitted of the charge of illegally firing a handgun.

Vallée became one of the main drug smugglers for the Hells Angels, bringing drugs over the Canada–United States border. In January 1993, a group of Canadian Hells Angles walked into a bowling ally/bar in the border town of Champlain, New York, and asked the bartender, Lee Carter, if he wanted to make some money as a drug "mule" bringing cocaine from New York to Montreal. Carter feigned agreement, but promptly contacted the New York State Police, who recruited him as an undercover agent. Carter purchased cocaine in New York, which he handed over to two Canadian Hells Angels who attempted to smuggle the cocaine over the border, but who were arrested by the U.S. Customs. The arrest was done in a manner that made it appear that it was a random search. Some 57 kilograms of cocaine were seized. Carter visited Montreal where he spoke with Roy and Vallée. Carter was the only witness who could tie Vallée to the drug smuggling case. On 26 July 1993, a man in a U.S. Postal Service uniform asked one of Carter's neighbors where he lived, saying he had some mail for him; the neighbor pointed to Carter's house. On 28 July 1993, Carter was killed by a bomb planted in his car. Without Carter as a witness, the American authorities were forced to drop the case against Vallée, and the extradition request to Canada was withdrawn.

On 1 April 1995, a Hells Angels hitman, Serge Quesnel, was arrested on charges of murder. Quesnel turned Crown's evidence and named Vallée as Carter's killer. The police raided a Montreal house owned by Vallée and found explosives, blasting caps and a U.S. Postal Services uniform. In December 1996, a grand jury in Albany, New York indicted Vallée on charges on first-degree murder, and the United States filed an extradition request with Canada.

Vallée became a founding member of the Hells Angels' elite Nomad chapter on 24 June 1995. He forged especially close connections with two chapters of the Satan's Choice Motorcycle Club, namely the Sudbury chapter led by Michel Dubé, and the Hamilton chapter led by the wrestler Ion Croitoru. Vallée sold the majority of the cocaine that was in turn sold by the Hamilton and Sudbury chapters of Satan's Choice. To assist with his business in northern Ontario, Vallée recruited Sylvain "20/20" Vachon of the Angels' Sherbrooke chapter, who often brought cocaine into Sudbury to sell to Dúbe's chapter.

=== Fugitive ===
On 21 January 1997, while being held at the Rivière des Prairies penitentiary, Vallée was attacked by another prisoner who broke his jaw. On 5 June 1997, just two days before Vallée was due to be extradited, he was taken to the Hôpital Saint-Luc to be treated for his injured jaw. Going along with him were two unarmed guards. A woman claiming to be Vallée's wife called the hospital and asked if he was there; the hospital confirmed that he was. A man wearing dark sunglasses then walked into the hospital, saying he was a visitor. Vallée asked for permission to take a shower before returning to prison, which was granted. While Vallée was taking a shower, a guard was in the bathroom to ensure he could not escape. The man with the sunglasses had hidden himself in the closet of the bathroom and then emerged with a shotgun. The first guard was bound and gagged, to be followed up by the second guard who was waiting outside of the bathroom. Vallée and his accomplice then escaped from the hospital, fleeing on stolen motorcycles.

Vallée went to Costa Rica for a number of years. During this time, he was featured on the television program America's Most Wanted several times. The U.S. Marshals Service posted a notice, which read: "Armed and dangerous... Vallée is a member of a large-scale international smuggling organization and a demolition expert with a violent criminal history".

At some point, Vallée returned to Canada. At about 1:30 am on 11 April 2003, a man was driving his automobile in Montreal turned right on a red light at Sherbrooke Street West and Décaire Boulevard. Montreal is alongside New York the only city in North America where it is illegal to turn right on a red light, causing a policeman who witnessed the turn to signal to the driver to pull over. The driver of the car had an automobile license that gave his name as a Guy Turner. As the driver was drunk, the policeman arrested him for drunk driving, and then discovered a loaded handgun together with some $3,500 in cash in the car. The driver known as "Guy Turner" was taken to the police station, where a finger print test revealed he was Vallée. By this time, the police had already released Vallée, believing him to be Guy Turner. The Sureté du Québec arrested Vallée on 17 April 2003 as he leaving a store on Saint-Mathieu Street.

In 2006, Vallée was extradited to the United States, and convicted of first-degree murder for Carter's death in September 2007. On 13 April 2008, Vallée was sentenced to life imprisonment with no chance of parole. Vallée is currently living at the high-security United States Penitentiary, Lewisburg.

== Books ==
- Auger, Michel; Edwards, Peter (2012). The Encyclopedia of Canadian Organized Crime: From Captain Kidd to Mom Boucher. Toronto: McClelland & Stewart. ISBN 978-0771030499.
- Cherry, Paul (2005). The Biker Trials: Bringing Down the Hells Angels. ECW Press. ISBN 9781554902507.
- Langton, Jerry (2010). Showdown: How the Outlaws, Hells Angels and Cops Fought for Control of the Streets. Toronto: John Wiley & Sons. ISBN 978-0-470-67878-7.
- Langton, Jerry (2006). Fallen Angel The Unlikely Rise of Walter Standick in the Canadian Hells Angels. Toronto: John Wiley & Sons. ISBN 144342773X.
- Schneider, Stephen (2009). Iced: The Story of Organized Crime in Canada (2nd ed.). Toronto: John Wiley & Sons. ISBN 978-0470835005.
