= Michel Auger =

Canadian journalist (1944–2020)

Michel Auger (27 June 1944 – 31 October 2020) was a Canadian journalist. He was a crime reporter with Le Journal de Montréal, and he spent 42 years in journalism, starting out as a freelancer before becoming well known for covering organized crime, including years of strife between rival motorcycle gangs in the province of Quebec. In 2000, he was shot six times in the back during an attack outside the newspaper office.

== Career ==
As a young reporter in his home province of Quebec, Auger started off freelancing stories, but gravitated towards crime reporting, where he made his mark on the journalism industry as a reporter who could communicate with both the police and the criminal element in the pursuit of stories. Over the years, he wrote on topics including the Mafia, union corruption associated with André Desjardins, criminal gangs and other topics, including the long and bloody conflict through the 1990s between rival Quebec motorcycle gangs, the Hells Angels and the Rock Machine.

In the midst of that conflict, around 11 a.m. on 13 September 2000, Auger was in the Le Journal parking lot when an assailant came up behind him and shot him six times in the back. Despite his wounds, Auger was able to call 911 and summon help, and eventually recovered from the injuries, although doctors were unable to remove three of the bullets. Police have continued to investigate the shooting, but have not made any arrests.

Auger also written several books on crime and crime reporting, including his memoirs, The Biker Who Shot Me and The Encyclopedia of Canadian Organized Crime with Peter Edwards.

Auger's work was recognized with a number of awards, including one from the Canadian Journalists for Free Expression, the National Newspaper Association and the Quebec government.

On 28 August 2006, Auger announced his retirement from daily reporting. He continued to write columns, as well as work on television projects and more books.

On 31 October 2020, Auger died of pancreatitis.
