= Norm Descôteaux =

Canadian ice hockey player

Norm Descoteaux
- Born: January 3, 1948 (age 78) Montreal, Quebec, Canada
- Height: 5 ft 9 in (175 cm)
- Weight: 170 lb (77 kg; 12 st 2 lb)
- Position: Defenceman
- Shot: Left
- Played for: Quebec Nordiques
- Playing career: 1965–1974

Joseph Normand Descôteaux (born January 3, 1948) is a Canadian retired professional ice hockey player who played 37 games in the World Hockey Association for the Quebec Nordiques.

Later Descôteaux became known for his loansharking activities and involvement with Quebec outlaw bikers.

== Career statistics ==
=== Regular season and playoffs ===
			Regular season					Playoffs
Season	Team	League	GP	G	A	Pts	PIM	GP	G	A	Pts	PIM
1963–64	Maisonneuve Braves	MMJHL	43	1	5	6	4	––	––	––	––	––
1964–65	Montreal North Beavers	MMJHL	41	6	16	22	48	––	––	––	––	––
1965–66	Montreal Junior Canadiens	OHA	47	1	6	7	41	––	––	––	––	––
1966–67	Montreal Junior Canadiens	OHA	45	6	21	27	69	––	––	––	––	––
1967–68	Montreal Junior Canadiens	OHA	50	5	31	36	57	––	––	––	––	––
1968–69	Muskegon Mohawks	IHL	30	6	13	19	8	11	2	2	4	6
1968–69	Amarillo Wranglers	CHL	12	0	2	2	4	––	––	––	––	––
1970–71	Muskegon Mohawks	IHL	69	15	31	46	30	6	1	0	1	2
1971–72	French National Team	Intl	Statistics Unavailable
1972–73	Quebec Nordiques	WHA	2	0	1	1	0	––	––	––	––	––
1973–74	Quebec Nordiques	WHA	35	1	6	7	6	––	––	––	––	––
1973–74	Maine Nordiques	NAHL	37	8	32	40	15	3	0	0	0	0
WHA totals			37	1	7	8	6	—	—	—	—	—
