= Marcel Demers =

Canadian outlaw biker and gangster

- Born: 10 March 1957 (age 69); Quebec City, Quebec, Canada
- Other name: "Le Maire"
- Occupations: outlaw biker and gangster
- Known for: Founding member and president of the Rock Machine Quebec City chapter; Rock Machine National Vice-president
- Predecessor: Claude Vézina
- Successor: Frédéric Faucher (Quebec City); Alain Brunette (National VP)
- Allegiance: Rock Machine MC (1988–2000)

Marcel Demers is a Canadian outlaw biker and gangster who played a major role in the Quebec Biker War (1994-2002). During this period he would become president of the Rock Machine Motorcycle Club's Quebec City chapter. In 1997, he would become the Rock Machine Motorcycle Club's national vice-president. He was given the nickname "Le Maire" which translates to "The Mayor".

== Rock Machine ==
Marcel Demers was born on March 10, 1957, in Quebec City, Quebec, Canada. In 1988, he was a founding member of the Rock Machine Motorcycle Club's Quebec City chapter and would eventually act as its vice president under chapter Founder Claude Vézina. In 1994, Rock Machine Founder Salvatore Cazzetta was arrested at a pitbull farm located in Fort Erie, Ontario, and charged with attempting to import more than eleven tons (22,000 lbs) of cocaine valued at an estimated 275 million dollars US (adjusting for inflation, the 2021 value is $513,238,697). Claude Vézina who was founder president of the Quebec City chapter, succeeded Cazzetta as national president, and would lead the club through the initial period of the conflict with the Hells Angels. Renaud Jomphe was unanimously elected president of the Montreal chapter, while Marcel Demers would replace Vézina as president of the Quebec City chapter, until eventually opening the Beauport chapter in late 1996.

In mid 1996, Marcel Demers, who had been acting president of the Quebec City chapter created a second Rock Machine chapter in the city, it was located in the suburb of Beauport. With Demers becoming the president of the new Beauport chapter, Frédéric Faucher was promoted to president of the Quebec City chapter. As one of the club's most prominent members, Demers, became an assassination target for the Hells Angels. On November 14, 1996, a masked man, fired at least five bullets at Demers as he was exiting his car outside a corner store in a Quebec City suburb. The attacker escaped in a car, he was hit several times in his back and left arm as they drove by his car, this all occurred on a street in the Quebec City suburb of Beauport, close to the Rock Machine's Beauport chapter clubhouse. Despite his injuries, he managed to drive himself to Enfant Jesus Hospital and walked himself into the emergency room. Hells Angels "Hang-arounds" Jean Fradette and Yan Laplante were arrested for the shooting.

On 23 August 1998, a team of Rock Machine members led by Fred Faucher, included hitman Gerald Gallant and Marcel Demers, they rode by on their motorcycles and gunned down Paolo Cotroni in his driveway. Cotroni was a member of the Calabrian 'Ndrangheta Cotroni crime family, who were the rivals of the Sicilian Mafia Rizzuto crime family. Cotroni was killed partly to gain the favor of the Rizzutos and partly because he was a friend of Hells Angels leader Maurice Boucher. On October 15, 2000, Demers and Fred Faucher were removed from the Le Bristo Plus bar on Saint-Jean street in Quebec City. The owner called the authorities because he didn't want any colors in his establishment.

== Imprisonment ==
On 6 December 2000, Demers along with national president, Frédéric Faucher were arrested on multiple charges and for ordering a bombing that caused major damage to a Hells Angels bunker and the surrounding neighborhood located in Saint-Nicolas, Quebec. Alain Brunette would he promoted to national president, Jean-Claude Belanger would replace Brunette as president of the Quebec City chapter. Robert Léger would head the Beauport chapter. Police reported that Demers arrest was due to is involvement in, what authorities dubbed a "narcotics empire", stating he along with Faucher had been responsible for the bombing of the bunker and several other incidents between 1994 and 2000. According to authorities, the Rock Machine chapters in Quebec under Demers and Faucher were responsible for distributed two kilograms of cocaine a month and generated almost $5 million in profits annually. He pled guilty to 17 charges in relation to the trafficking of narcotics and was sentenced to 9 years in prison on 11 May 2001. An additional thirteen bikers also received charges, including Simon Bédard, Gérald Gagnon, Michel "Sky" Langlois, Mario Dallaire, Guy Descarreaux and Serge Richard, would also receive charges. Demers was released in the mid-2000s.

== Operation Player ==
On March 26, 2009, Demers would be caught up in Operation Player which saw the arrest of eleven people after hitman Gerald Gallant became a Crown informant. Gallant had been employed by the Dark Circle and had also been employed to do jobs by the Rock Machine. During the conflict with the Hells Angels, he had been hired by Demers several times, and other club leaders Fred Faucher and Giovanni Cazzetta had also hired him several times between the years of 1994 and 2002. Gallant had attempted to flee to Geneva, Switzerland but was eventually arrested on credit card fraud and mistaken identity, testifying and giving more than fifty hours of statements. This enabled the authorities to apprehend Demers and ten other sponsors or accomplices of his 28 murders in 2009. It was revealed that Demers had left his life of crime behind and for several years he had held a job at a sprinkler company, he had also made attempts to reconcile with his family, forming a bond with his son that he did not have during his criminal days. Information revealed by Gérald Gallant led the courts to declare that Marcel Demers was "accused of committing or sanctioning 12 murders and 5 attempted murders perpetrated between 1996 and 2000". In January 2013, Demers avoided going to trial over the Gallant murders; he pleaded guilty to the lesser charge of conspiracy to commit murder and he was given 11 years in prison, with his total sentence stemming from the Quebec Biker War resulting in being 20 years, seven and a half years of provisional time were subtracted.

"Today, I realize the harm I have done to the families of the victims, including the Bergeron family, as well as to my own family and to the entire population."
