= Renaud Jomphe =

Canadian outlaw biker and gangster (1959–1996)

- Jomphe as Rock Machine Montreal chapter president
- Born: 1959; Montreal, Quebec, Canada
- Died: 18 October 1996 (aged 36–37); Montreal, Quebec, Canada
- Other names: "The King of Verdun"
- Occupations: Outlaw biker and gangster
- Known for: Founding member the Rock Machine; President of the Rock Machine's Montreal chapter
- Predecessor: Salvatore Cazzetta; Giovanni Cazzetta
- Successor: Peter Paradis
- Allegiance: SS Motorcycle Club(19??-1986); Rock Machine MC (1986–1996)

Renaud Jomphe (1959 – 18 October 1996) was a Canadian outlaw biker and gangster who was a founding member of the Rock Machine Motorcycle Club. He played a major role in the Quebec Biker War (1994-2002), and during this period, he became the president of the Rock Machine's Montreal chapter after the imprisonment of club founders Salvatore and Giovanni Cazzetta, a position he held until his death in 1996.

== Early life ==
Renaud Jomphe was born in Montreal, Quebec during 1959, and grew up in the east suburb of Verdun. He befriended the Cazzetta brothers, Salvatore and Giovanni, and became a founding member of the Rock Machine Motorcycle Club in 1986. By the early 1990s, Jomphe was in charge of a thriving narcotics trafficking network and had earned the title "the King of Verdun".

== President of the Montreal chapter ==
Jomphe was highly respected by all members of the Rock Machine as well as groups associated with the club. He was described by his fellow bikers as a "natural leader" and "a mentor". Unlike most criminals, Jomphe was a negotiator and considered violence only as a last resort, but also showed that once there was no possibility of a diplomatic solution, he had little issue with resorting to violence. In 1994, Rock Machine founder Salvatore Cazzetta was arrested at a pitbull farm located in Fort Erie, Ontario and charged with attempting to import more than eleven tons (22,000 lbs) of cocaine valued at an estimated 275 million dollars US (adjusting for inflation, the 2021 value is $513,238,697). Claude Vézina, who was founder and president of the Rock Machine's Quebec City chapter, succeeded Cazzetta as national president, and would lead the club through the initial period of the conflict with the Hells Angels. Jomphe was unanimously elected president of the Montreal chapter, while Marcel Demers would replace Vézina as president of the Quebec City chapter, until eventually opening the Beauport chapter in late 1996.

In the most infamous incident of les guerre des motards, as it is referred to in Quebec, on 9 August 1995, a Hells Angels associate named Marc Dubé was killed by an explosive device planted in his jeep. Dubé was leaving the Hells Angels clubhouse in the Hochelaga-Maisonneuve neighborhood of Montreal at the time of his murder, and it remains unclear whether it was the Angels or the Rock Machine who planted the bomb, but according to Dany Kane, who later became a government informant, Hells Angels leader Maurice Boucher planned the attack to gain back control; they planned on blaming the explosion on the Rock Machine. However, substantial evidence revealed by Kane points towards the theory of Hells Angels being behind the bombing. This entire situation brought upon an intense public reaction; Jomphe was interviewed and told reporter Michel Auger of the Journal de Montreal, that "we don't attack or target, and we certainly don't kill, children". He also referred to the Hells Angels as a "bunch of goons on a power trip", and stated that the bombing was the actions of the Angels and not his own club. On the following day of the interview, a motorcycle shop co-owned by Jomphe was subject of a drive-by shooting and it was riddled with bullets. The shop's manager was injured and a customer was fatally shot. Neither victim was connected to an organized crime.

== Death and funeral ==
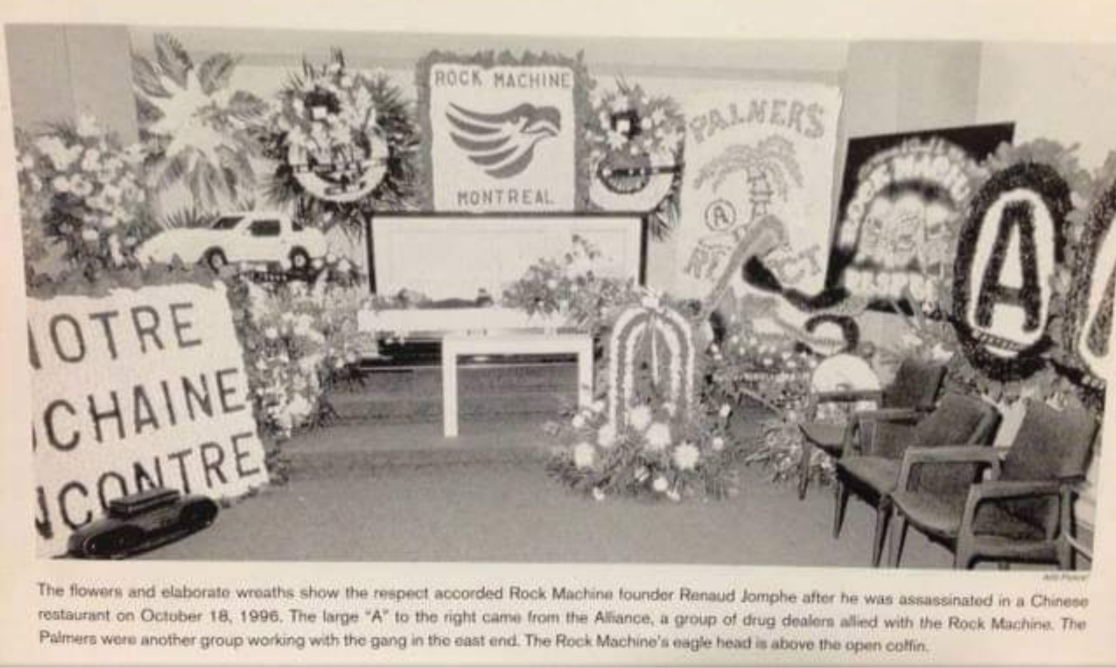
Funeral of Jomphe.

On 18 October 1996, Jomphe was shot and killed. The Rock Machine leader was seated with fellow club members Christian Deschenes and Raymond Laureau in a booth at the rear of a Chinese restaurant known as Restaurant Kim Hoa, located on Wellington Street. A man entered the establishment and approached the table, fired several shots, and fled out the rear of the building. Jomphe and Deschenes were killed, while Laureau was wounded in the shoulder. One of the Paradis Brothers, Peter Paradis, would succeed Jomphe as president of the Montreal chapter, taking over much of his business in the suburb of Verdun. He would eventually turn Crown informant (in the clubs 15 years' of existence at the time, he was the first member to turn Crown's witness) after the conflict's end and subsequent crackdown by police. During trial, he revealed that he was also present at the restaurant during the murder of Jomphe and Deschenes, proclaimed that Jomphe's cousin, Michel Germain, was responsible for the ambush. According to Paradis, Germain sold them out to the Hells Angels after a disagreement between the two; this loss deeply affected members of the Rock Machine due to Jomphe's highly regarded status within the organization.

On 24 October 1996, Jomphe's funeral ceremony was held. On October 23, authorities arrested a member of the Rowdy Crew Motorcycle Club, a Hells Angels support club, who had been loitering near the funeral home, forcing the family to cancel the church service. Instead, Jomphe's body, followed by five limousines and eleven Cadillacs carrying silver-and-black floral arrangements, was taken to an east-end crematorium, where he was cremated.
