= Paul Porter (biker) =

Canadian outlaw biker and gangster

- Born: 1963 (age 62–63); Montreal, Quebec, Canada
- Other name: "Sasquatch"
- Occupations: Outlaw biker, gangster
- Known for: Founder of the Rock Machine in Ontario and President of its Kingston chapter; Founder of the Ontario Nomads Hells Angels chapter in Ottawa
- Allegiance: SS MC (19??–1986); Rock Machine MC (1986–2000); Hells Angels MC (2000–2013)
- Conviction: Drug trafficking (2012)
- Penalty: 2 years' imprisonment (2012)

Paul Porter (born 1963) is a Canadian outlaw biker and gangster. A founding member of the Rock Machine Motorcycle Club, Porter played a major role in the Quebec Biker War (1994–2002). During this period, he expanded the club into Ontario, becoming the president of the Rock Machine's Kingston chapter. Disillusioned with the Rock Machine's decision to merge with the Bandidos, Porter led a mass defection to the Hells Angels in late 2000.

== Rock Machine ==
Porter was born in Montreal, Quebec in 1963 to an Anglo family. He acquired a criminal record beginning in 1985, with charges including serious drugs and weapons offences; a parole board later said he had "ingrained criminal values". He was given the nickname "Sasquatch" due to his six-foot-five frame that once weighted close to 425 lbs. Porter joined the SS Motorcycle Club, also known as the SS Merciless Riders, a white supremacist and anti-immigration motorcycle gang based in Pointe-aux-Trembles, and he became closely associated with fellow SS members Salvatore and Giovanni Cazzetta, Gilles Lambert and Johnny Plescio, with whom he would go on to be a founding member of the Rock Machine Motorcycle Club in 1986. He also befriended Maurice "Mom" Boucher, who joined the Hells Angels after parting ways with the SS. From 1990 to 1994, Porter was known as le boss de la Main, working as a pimp who controlled numerous brothels along Boulevard St-Laurent. Detective Benoit Roberge of the Montreal police stated: "He didn't do business with a lot of people. He was afraid; he didn't take chances; he preferred to sell fewer drugs and make less money if that meant staying out of prison". Porter maintained a high rank in the Rock Machine as well as a large amount of respect from its members and associates, and played a key role in co-leading the Rock Machine against the Hells Angels during the Quebec Biker War, which started in 1994.

On 7 December 1995, police arrested Yves "Flag" Gagné, a prominent member of the Hells Angels' Trois-Rivières chapter, and Guy Majeau, a member of the Rowdy Crew in Lanaudiere, a Hells Angels support club. Authorities also arrested Normand Lortie, an associate of the Angels and owner of a Laval strip club. All three were charged with conspiring to murder prominent members of the Rock Machine and the affiliated Dark Circle; the targets of the plot were founding members of the Rock Machine, including Porter and Richard "Bam Bam" Lagace, and Dark Circle member Louis-Jacques Deschenes. On 31 May 1997, Porter was driving down a rural highway near the town of L'Épiphanie, when a car driven by a Hell Angel sped by and he was shot in the left arm. Porter stated: "It wasn't my time to die". In March 1998, Porter was again shot when driving down Highway 25 near Lachenaie. In April 1998, Porter attended a biker "Show and Shine" in Georgetown. During the show, a bomb was found wrapped in a Toronto Sun newspaper. The bomb was a remote-controlled device of 2.2 kilograms of C-4 explosive filled with thousands of nails. These events caused him and some other members to go into hiding in Ontario in 1999.

Porter and other Rock Machine members secured a safe house near Ottawa, from where he would use his influence in the club to convince members of the Outlaws and other Ontario-based clubs to join the Rock Machine. While he was in Ontario, the Hells Angels and their support clubs took over Porter's personal territory in downtown Montreal. Porter founded the first Rock Machine chapter in Ontario in Kingston in June 2000. He served as president of the Kingston chapter, which was made up of Rock Machine members that had come with him from Quebec as well as former members of other local clubs. Porter was also in the process of forming a fourth chapter in Ottawa.

In late 2000, the Rock Machine were set to become a probationary club of the Bandidos. Seeing the division this caused in the Rock Machine/Bandidos ranks, the Hells Angels approached the Alliance with the offer of a ceasefire brokered by the Rizzuto crime family, which was accepted. In October 2000, Porter and other Rock Machine members returned to Montreal for a peace meeting at the Bleu Marin, a downtown Italian restaurant, followed by strip clubs. The truce had an ulterior motive for the Hells Angels as they hoped to halt the expansion of the Bandidos in Canada, especially in Ontario. The Hells Angels would also convince members of the Rock Machine who did not agree with the "patch-over" to join them. The truce would last for only a brief period before hostilities continued. This plan was mostly successful, and from late December 2000 until early 2001, eleven of the Rock Machine's Ontario members, including Porter, joined the Hells Angels. Porter was the most senior members to "patch over".

The Hells Angels' national president, Walter "Nurget" Stadnick, offered Hells Angels membership to the Rock Machine's chapters in Ontario. Furthermore, Stadnick offered Hells Angels membership on a "patch-for-patch" basis, allowing members to trade their current patches for equivalent Hells Angels, while the Bandidos required new members take a reduction in rank. Porter, as leader of the Rock Machine in Ontario, was at this point was extremely influential in the club and was responsible for initiating the creation of the Rock Machine's three chapters in Ontario. Porter wrote on the wall of the clubhouse: "Hello to all the RMMC, I wish you the best with your new colours! Bye my brothers!" Porter became the president of the new Hells Angels Ontario Nomads chapter located in Ottawa. The fact that the Hells Angels had conspired to kill Porter several times when he was a member of the Rock Machine did not stop him from defecting. Dan Gore of the Ottawa police stated: "He had a lot of intelligence [on the Rock Machine]. Porter knew everything – their houses, their summer cottages, their families". Porter also brought over a number of Rock Machine leaders, most notably André "Curly" Sauvageau.

Members of the Rock Machine commented on the departure of Porter saying:

"I saw some of you cry at funeral homes. Were those crocodile tears? Surely you haven't forgotten Renaud, Dada, Bambam, Christian, Franky, Johnny, Tony, Ben, Pierre, Duck, Richard and all the others", one posting said, listing some of the Rock Machine members killed in the past six years."

"This is unbelieveble man, How does anybody have the nerves to do such kind of thing, how the hell can he live with himself and don't he know that his 'new friends' are just using him. When the friends has received enough info about RMMC guys, the chapters, the manners, the contacts and their families to their records, the SAS man [Mr. Porter]is no longer usefull for them, so he will end up with a bullet in his head at a sleazy backyard and his friends are having a good laugh."

== Hells Angels ==
Porter reconnected with his friend Maurice Boucher in late 2000. For his part in causing several other members of the Rock Machine to defect, Porter was given permission to form the Hells Angels Ontario Nomads chapter, located on Piperville Road right off of Highway 417, near downtown Ottawa. As president of the Ontario Nomads, he led the club in the province and had practically full authority over all other members in Ontario. He had the power to veto any vote from chapters in the province he didn't agree with and led all provincial club "runs" conducted by the Angels.

On 23 April 2004, Quebec police issued an arrest warrant for Porter in connection with raids conducted on the Hells Angels in Quebec. He was also accused of operating a grand theft auto ring targeting luxury vehicles. The Sûreté du Québec launched raids in almost 40 locations across the province. The operation began 18 months earlier, when police in Montreal seized 15 stolen vehicles, mostly luxury SUVs made by Lexus or Mercedes-Benz, worth a total of $1.2 million. This led authorities to uncover a narcotics ring in the Montreal area; they seized counterfeit money, firearms, 30 kilograms of dried marijuana, 700 marijuana plants and two kilograms of hashish, as well as documents, stolen computers and $21,000 in cash. At least 56 people were arrested in total, and warrants were issued for five others including Porter, who decided to turn himself in and travelled to the Sûreté du Québec headquarters in Montreal.

On 12 September 2009, Porter was arrested on a farm in Navan near Ottawa. Police had tailed him and upon his arrest they seized nine kilograms of cocaine from his vehicle. Charges were initially brought up against Porter's girlfriend. However, they would be dropped when he was sentenced; Porter declared the cocaine found in her purse belonged to him and demanded that she be given a plea deal. On 10 April 2012, Porter was sentenced to two years in prison for narcotics trafficking. During his sentence, he worked as a cleaner at an undisclosed prison, and he received a score on an inmate evaluation indicating he is a low risk to re-offend.

== Parole hearing and release ==
In June 2013, regardless of his good behavior while incarcerated, Porter was denied parole. Porter had been a "model inmate with no institutional charges or security concerns", according to his prison file. According to the parole board records, in June 2013, Porter claimed he planned on leaving the Hells Angels permanently, stating he "intends to turn in his colours with honour", as long as membership of the Ottawa-based Ontario Nomads chapter increased, so his retirement would not cause it to be frozen. Hells Angels bylaws require each chapter to have at least six active members to keep its active status. The documents provided to the parole board suggest Porter's exit could jeopardize the chapter's membership requirements.

"The (parole) board discussed your relationship with the (Hells Angels) and confirmed that it is your stated intention to leave with honour so that you would not place yourself at risk in the future, as you would if you were to leave dishonorably. You claim that you have never been violent, either as a member of the Rock Machine or the Hells Angels even during the time that the two groups were engaged in a deadly war. You appeared to want the board to believe that these motorcycle gangs were violent but … that you were uninvolved. Rather, you claimed to be a peacemaker during that time. In spite of this score your case management team believes the results could be an under-estimate of your risk given your connections to motorcycle gangs. Although your criminal history is not particularly dense, it does include convictions for drugs and weapons, but more importantly, we cannot ignore your participation in a leadership role within (a) motorcycle gang for many years. We believe that you have deeply entrenched criminal values and attitudes and that your adherence to your criminal associates is particularly strong. This is a risk issue that has not been mitigated following your arrest or conviction, and has convinced the board that your risk to the community would be undue at this time. Therefore, day parole and full parole are denied."

On 6 January 2014, Porter was released from prison on the condition that he not associate with any member of organized crime until September 2014, when his charges for narcotics trafficking expired. He stated that his future plans were to run his own tow truck company and fix motorcycles on the side.

== Books ==
- Langton, Jerry (2010). Showdown: How the Outlaws, Hells Angels and Cops Fought for Control of the Streets. Toronto: John Wiley & Sons. ISBN 978-0-470-67878-7.
- Sher, Julian; Marsden, William (2003). The Road to Hell: How the Biker Gangs are Conquering Canada. A.A. Knopf Canada. ISBN 978-0-676-97598-7.
