= Frédéric Faucher =

Canadian outlaw biker and gangster

- Born: 16 December 1969 (age 56); Quebec City, Quebec, Canada
- Other name: "Fred"
- Occupations: Outlaw biker, gangster
- Known for: National president of the Rock Machine; Former President of the Rock Machine Quebec City chapter
- Predecessor: Claude Vézina (National); Marcel Demers (Quebec City)
- Successor: Alain Brunette (Both)
- Allegiance: Rock Machine MC (1993–2000); Bandidos MC (2000)
- Convictions: Drug trafficking (2001); Conspiracy to commit murder (2012)
- Penalty: 12 years' imprisonment (2001); 11 years' imprisonment (2012)

Frédéric Faucher (born 16 December 1969) is a Canadian outlaw biker and gangster who served as national president of the Rock Machine Motorcycle Club during the Quebec Biker War (1994–2002). He played a significant role in the conflict and was responsible for facilitating the merger between the Rock Machine and the Bandidos Motorcycle Club, which took place on 1 December 2001.

== Criminal career ==
=== Rock Machine ===
Born in Quebec City, Quebec, Faucher and his brother Jean-Judes joined the local chapter of the Rock Machine Motorcycle Club and both attained full membership in the club by the early 1990s. Frédéric Faucher would play a key role in co-leading the Rock Machine against the Hells Angels during the Quebec Biker War. He was involved in the initial wave of attacks which initiated the conflict. On 13 July 1994, three Rock Machine members walked into a motorcycle shop in Rivière-des-Prairies and killed Pierre Daoust, a member of a Hells Angels support club Death Riders MC. The following day, the Rock Machine attempted to kill Normand Robitaille, a member of a Hells Angels' Montreal Rockers support club. Robitaille survived the shooting and was transported to hospital. On the same day, Faucher along with four other members of the Rock Machine were arrested in a hotel by the Sûreté du Québec after they uncovered a plot to blow up the South Shore clubhouse of a Hells Angels support club called the Evil Ones MC. Police seized two fully loaded pistols, three radio-detonated bombs with triggers, and twelve pounds of dynamite. Faucher and the other members were charged and received minimal sentences; during this period, corruption in Quebec's law enforcement and court system was at an all-time high. In 2000, a Montreal Crown attorney (a prosecutor) complained to the media that "they [the bikers] kill with impunity", saying it almost impossible to convict members of either the Hells Angels or the Rock Machine because of widespread corruption in the Quebec justice system.

=== National president ===
By 1996, Faucher had been released from prison, In mid 1996, Marcel Demers who was acting president of the Quebec City chapter created a second Rock Machine chapter in the city, it was located in the suburb of Beauport. With Demers becoming the president of the new Beauport chapter, Faucher was promoted to president of the Quebec City chapter. In mid 1997 Claude Vézina, who was the founder of the chapter, was reinstated as national president after the arrest of Giovanni Cazzetta. On 21 May 1997, Vézina and fellow Rock Machine member Dany "Le Gros" Légaré were both charged with the trafficking of narcotics. After the arrest of Vézina, Faucher was promoted to national president. Faucher had gained wide attention in underworld circles by blowing up the Hells Angels' clubhouse in Quebec City in February 1997, and he became the Rock Machine's new national president on 11 September 1997, Alain Brunette was promoted to president of the Quebec City chapter. Faucher decided the best hope for the Rock Machine was to have the club absorbed into the Bandidos, the second-largest outlaw biker club in the world. As the biker war turned into a battle of attrition, the Hells Angels began to gain the upper hand as ever-increasing levels of support poured in from around Canada and internationally. At the same time, the Nordic Biker War was taking place in northern Europe, and Faucher and the Rock Machine were impressed with the way that the Scandinavian branches of the Bandidos held their own against the Scandinavian branches of the Hells Angels. In June 1997, Rock Machine leaders Faucher, Johnny Plescio and Robert "Tout Tout" Léger went to Stockholm to seek support from the Swedish branch of the Bandidos, but were expelled by the Swedish authorities, who declared that they did not want Canadian bikers in their country. Remaining undeterred, on 14 July 1997, Faucher along with chapter presidents Plescio and Paul Porter, attended a motorcycle show in Luxembourg. There, the Rock Machine was seen meeting with high-ranking members of the Bandidos.

Faucher was the authorities' prime suspect for the attempted murder of a member of the Hells Angels' Nomad chapter, Louis "Melou" Roy, that occurred on 24 July 1997. Roy survived the attack, despite being struck four times, and no one was brought up on charges. On 23 August 1998, a team of Rock Machine members led by Faucher, including Gerald Gallant and Marcel Demers, rode by on their motorcycles and gunned down Paolo Cotroni in his driveway. Cotroni was a member of the Calabrian 'Ndrangheta Cotroni crime family, who were the rivals of the Sicilian Mafia Rizzuto crime family. Cotroni was killed partly to gain the favor of the Rizzutos and partly because he was a friend of Hells Angels leader Maurice Boucher.

The Rock Machine became a "hang-around" club for the Bandidos in May 1999. In December 1999, authorities raided the house of Faucher's brother, Jean-Judes Faucher, who was also a high-profile member of the Rock Machine at the time. Police seized photo albums loaded with pictures of Hells Angels members and associates that were targets of the group. The increased media coverage of crime in Montreal caused by the conflict made the Rizzuto crime family, regarded as the most powerful Mafia family in Canada, to seek a truce between the warring biker clubs. On 26 September 2000, Vito Rizzuto held a meeting at an Italian restaurant named Bleu Martin attended by both Boucher, the leader of Hells Angels in Quebec, and Faucher, the leader of the Rock Machine, in an attempt to impose a truce. On 8 October 2000, to celebrate Thanksgiving, Boucher and Faucher had dinner together at Bleu Martin and, while a photographer from Allô Police recorded the scene, the leaders of the Hells Angels and the Rock Machine exchanged handshakes, hugged and broke bread together (a common symbol in French-Canada of reconciliation). To seal the truce, the biker leaders then went to the Super-Sexe, the most exclusive and expensive strip club in Montreal on the Rue Sainte-Catherine, with the photographers from Allô Police covering their visit.

The truce brokered by the Rizzutos lasted only a few weeks and was ended when the Rock Machine officially joined the Bandidos. In a sort of reverse takeover, Faucher arranged for the Rock Machine to "patch over" to join the Bandidos in a bid to "internationalize" the conflict by involving the Bandidos, who were based in Texas. The Rock Machine was sponsored to "patch over" by the Swedish and French branches of the Bandidos while the American leadership disapproved, not wanting to be dragged into a war with the Hells Angels. After 18 months as a "hang-around" club, the Rock Machine became a probationary chapter of the Bandidos in on 1 December 2000. With the Loners providing security at the ceremony in Vaughan, Ontario, the Ontario faction of the Rock Machine formally took on the Bandidos patches. Unlike the Hells Angels, those bikers joining the Bandidos had to enter as "prospect" members regardless of what their membership had been in the Rock Machine, which was considered very off-putting, causing several members to join the Angels. Shortly afterwards, Faucher was arrested on 6 December 2000, on charges of importing cocaine into Canada and Alain "Red Tomato" Brunette became the probationary Bandidos new national president.

=== Imprisonment ===
On 6 December 2000, Faucher along with Marcel Demers, a founding member of the Rock Machine and President of its Beauport chapter, were arrested on multiple charges and for ordering a bombing that caused major damage to a Hells Angels bunker located in Saint-Nicolas, Quebec. Alain Brunette would he promoted to the position of national president until he became the first president of Bandidos Canada on 1 December 2001, Jean-Claude Belanger would replace Brunette as president of the Quebec City chapter. Robert Léger would head the Beauport chapter. Police reported that Faucher's arrest was due to the fact he was the leader of a narcotics empire and had been responsible for the bombing of the bunker and six other buildings between 1996 and 1997. According to authorities, he was earning $250,000 per month from cocaine trafficking alone. He pled guilty to 28 charges and was sentenced to 12 years in prison on 11 May 2001. An additional thirteen bikers also received charges, including Simon Bédard, Gérald Gagnon, Michel "Sky" Langlois, Mario Dallaire, Guy Descarreaux and Serge Richard, would also receive charges.

Faucher would later be caught up in Operation Player, which saw the arrest of eleven people after hitman Gerald Gallant became a Crown informant. Gallant had been employed by the Dark Circle and had also been employed to do jobs by the Rock Machine. During the conflict with the Hells Angels, he had been hired by Faucher seven times, and other club leaders Vézina and Giovanni Cazzetta had also hired him several times between the years of 1994 and 2002. Gallant had attempted to flee to Geneva, Switzerland but was eventually arrested on credit card fraud and mistaken identity, testifying and giving more than fifty hours of statements. This enabled the authorities to apprehend Faucher and ten other sponsors or accomplices of his 28 murders in 2009. On 8 November 2012, Faucher avoided going to trial over the Gallant murders; he pleaded guilty to the lesser charge of conspiracy to commit murder and his eleven-year sentence was increased to 23 years with possibility of parole.

== Release ==
In November 2016, Faucher was released from prison after fifteen years of incarceration. He was ordered by the Parole Board of Canada (PBC) to spend six months in a halfway house before returning to life as a law abiding citizen. Faucher had taken construction courses during his time in prison. Faucher, who had recently been married and had a child, made a statement saying: "I am committed to volunteering and legitimate employment". He also stated that he "did not want his child to adopt the same kind of life" as the one he led in his early life. He claims he has not been associated with bikers since 2005. Authorities remarked they were going to be keeping an eye on Faucher, but they believed the risk of him reoffending after the progress he had made was low. However, there were still widespread concern among some that he might join the Hells Angels. Faucher's brother, Jean-Judes, had joined the Angels in 2003.
