= Johnny Plescio =

Canadian outlaw biker and gangster (1964–1998)

- Born: 1964; Montreal, Quebec, Canada
- Died: 8 September 1998 (aged 33–34); Laval, Quebec, Canada
- Occupation(s): Outlaw biker, gangster
- Known for: Founding member of the Rock Machine; Rock Machine National Secretary
- Successor: Robert Léger
- Allegiance: Rock Machine MC (1986–1998)

Johnny Plescio (1964 – 8 September 1998) was a Canadian outlaw biker and gangster, who was one of the founding members of the Rock Machine Motorcycle Club. Plescio became widely known for his "strong-arm tactics" and was highly respected within the club.

== Rock Machine ==
Born in Montreal, Plescio became close friends with Salvatore and Giovanni Cazzetta, with whom he would go on to become a founding member of the Rock Machine in 1986. He maintained a leadership position in the club and was held in high regard by its members and associates. Plescio would play a key role in co-leading the Rock Machine against the Hells Angels during the Quebec Biker War. By 1980, Plescio had begun to participate in criminal activities. He spent portions of the 1980s in and out of prison, with most of his convictions on charges related to petty crime. However, in 1983, he would be arrested by Quebec police for plotting to blow up a Saint-Leonard grocery store, after local authorities received a tip from Plescio's accomplice who had backed out of the plan. Plescio admitted to police that he had been paid $1,000 by a rival business to destroy the grocery store. Police also located seven sticks of TNT and a 12-gauge shotgun during a search of Plescio's house. Following his release from prison in 1986, Plescio became a founding member of the Rock Machine Motorcycle Club. According to future Rock Machine Montreal chapter president Peter Paradis, Plescio developed a reputation within the club for his lavish spending on prostitutes during club gatherings; rather than sleep with the women, he often preferred to corral one of them over to the bar and spend the night insulting her while drinking to excess.

By 1993, Plescio had become well-respected in Quebec's underground and had been serving as the sergeant-at-arms of the Rock Machine's Montreal chapter for some time; he had also been involved in multiple encounters with law enforcement as a member of the Rock Machine. Quebec Police had received information that the Rock Machine was selling large amounts of narcotics out of East Montreal bars, and began monitoring the Huron Street bunker owned by the club's Montreal chapter. In mid-1993, Plescio was arrested and charged with threatening an officer of the Montreal Police. The case involved Eric Toupin, a former club associate who had become a police informant after being arrested on narcotics trafficking charges. During the trial, Plescio was overheard telling fellow Rock Machine member Serge Cyr that he planned to murder Jeffrey Stern, a police officer who had just testified against him; this incident soon led to a second charge of uttering threats against Plescio. The officer who overheard the remark, Michel Chartrand, was called as a witness and provided testimony regarding the second threat. Plescio would ultimately be acquitted of the original count, but was found guilty of threatening Jeffrey Stern during his trial.

On 7 December 1995, the judge sentenced Plescio to three months in prison; by this time, Plescio was operating as the Rock Machine's national secretary. On that same day, he and three other members of the Rock Machine were involved in an altercation. During the Quebec Biker War, the publicized nature of court appearances meant that opposing groups could track their enemies' public appearances and plan attacks in advance; as such, the Rock Machine had arranged for the Paradis Brothers (who were club prospects at the time) to accompany Plescio to the courthouse in Montreal as his security guards. Prior to his sentencing, the Rock Machine delegation walked to the courthouse cafeteria to purchase food, where they were confronted by a group of men. The assailants included six members of the Jokers, a support club of the Hells Angels, as well as Luc Gauthier and Paul Magnan. Insults quickly erupted into a large brawl between the two groups, with the Paradis Brothers throwing chairs in every direction. The courthouse police were forced to separate the two clubs and detain those involved, with all but Plescio being released after receiving a $250 fine.

As the Quebec Biker War turned into a battle of attrition, the Hells Angels began to gain the upper hand as ever-increasing levels of support poured in from across Canada and internationally. At the same time, the Nordic Biker War was taking place in northern Europe, and the Rock Machine was impressed with the way that the Scandinavian branches of the Bandidos held their own against the Scandinavian branches of the Hells Angels. In June 1997, three leaders of the Rock Machine – Plescio, along with Fred Faucher and Robert "Tout Tout" Léger – went to Stockholm to seek support from the Swedish branch of the Bandidos; the visiting group was ultimately expelled by the Swedish police, who declared that they did not want Canadian bikers in their country.

== Death ==
On 8 September 1998, Plescio, was at his Laval home watching television when his cable connection was severed. As he rose to see what was wrong with his television, 27 bullets were fired through the window of Plescio's living room, 16 of which struck his body, fatally injuring him. Plescio's funeral was held on 15 September 1998, attended by around 65 members of the Rock Machine and numerous other associates of the organization that came to pay their respects. A flower arrangement appeared bearing the word "Bandidos", which was the first sign that the Texas-based Bandidos biker gang was taking an interest in the Rock Machine. Authorities did not want any further incidents occurring so they provided security for the entrance of the funeral and demanded identifications from those entering.
