= Edward Winterhalder =

American writer and biker

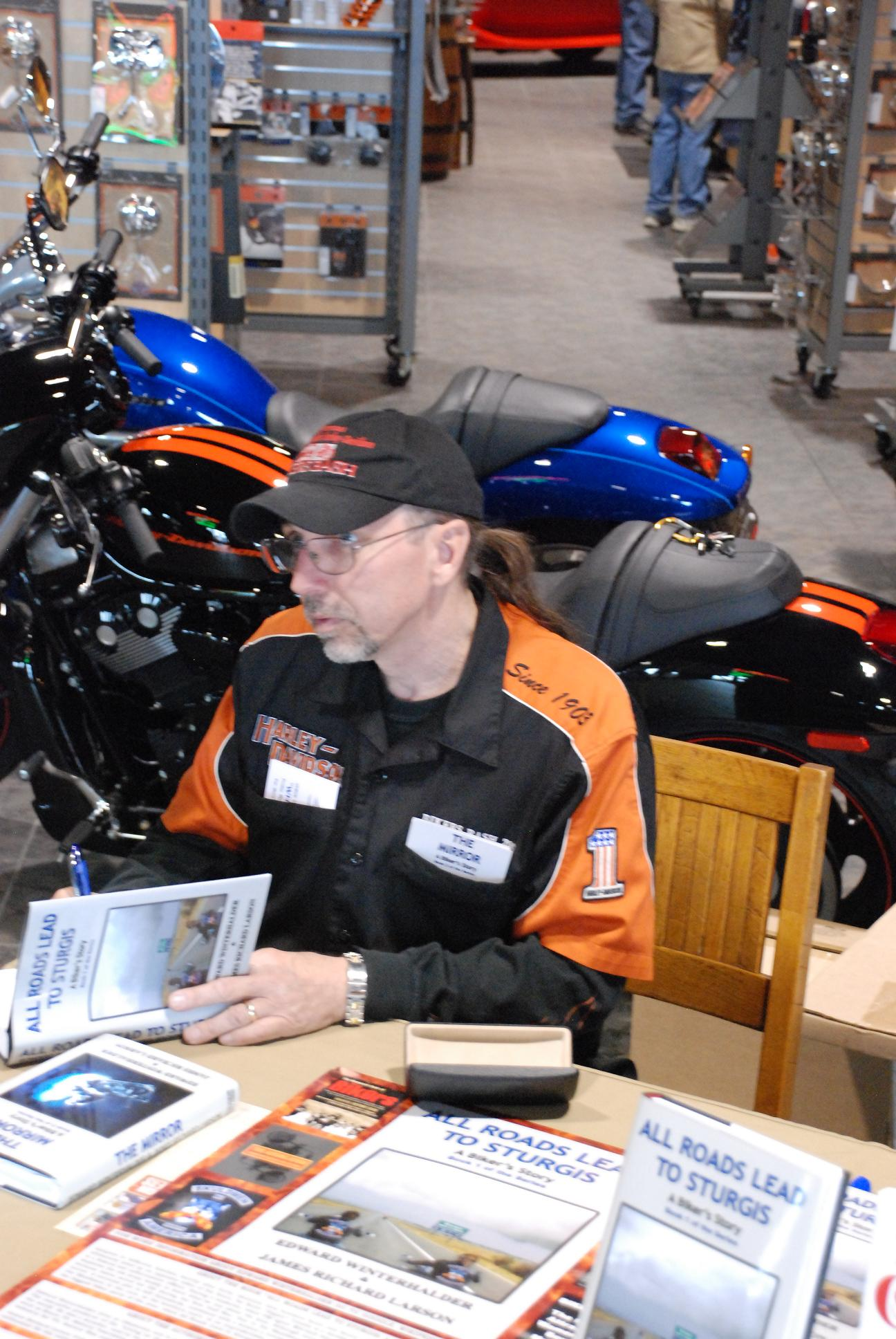
- Winterhalder at a book signing in Lansing, Michigan
- Born: 1955 (age 70–71); New England, U.S.
- Occupations: Television producer author screenwriter musician

Edward Winterhalder (born 1955) is an American television producer; an author who has written fifteen books about motorcycle clubs and the outlaw biker lifestyle published in various languages; and a former outlaw biker.

== Early life ==
Winterhalder was born in New England, grew up in southern Connecticut, and moved to Oklahoma in 1975 after serving in the US Army. In Oklahoma he joined the Rogues Motorcycle Club and was a close associate of the Bandidos outlaw motorcycle club from 1979 to 1997, and a high-ranking member of the Bandidos from 1997 to 2003.

== Bandidos ==
In May 1997 Winterhalder established the Oklahoma chapter of the Bandidos and was the high-ranking member of the Bandidos responsible for the assimilation of a Canadian outlaw motorcycle club known as the Rock Machine into the Bandidos during the Quebec Biker War, which became the first Canadian chapters of the Bandidos motorcycle club. Winterhalder left the Bandidos in September 2003 to spend time with his family, pursue business interests and better manage his construction company.

== Career ==
A television show titled Heavy Duty Bikers, set in the world of outlaw bikers in northern England, is in development as of July 2025, with The Hunger Games producer Jim Miller, Henry Cole, Graham Spencer, Winterhalder and British author Iain Parke credited as executive producers. It is based on six of Parke's novels.

Since 2005, Winterhalder has authored or co-authored books, and produced television shows about the Harley-Davidson biker culture. He is the creator/executive producer of the Quebec Biker War, Steel Horse Cowboys: Leather, Chrome & Thunder, Real American Bikers, Biker Chicz, and Living on the Edge: Riding with the Vietnam Vets Motorcycle Club in Pennsylvania television shows, and is the subject of a feature-length documentary movie that was filmed in 2015 and 2016 in Pennsylvania, Michigan and Dubai.

Winterhalder is a consultant to the entertainment industry for television shows and feature films that focus on the biker lifestyle, has appeared in television shows on National Geographic (US, Australia, UK and New Zealand), History Television (Canada), the History Channel (US and Australia), Global TV (Canada), Prime TV (New Zealand), and the AB Groupe (Europe), and has been interviewed on Fox News Channel, the O'Reilly Factor hosted by Bill O'Reilly, ABC Nightline, MSNBC's NewsNation with Tamron Hall, and Inside Edition.

He has been a featured author on Bravo TV's "The Word" in the same episode as JK Rowling; appeared in the Outlaw Bikers television series in Canada; been quoted in magazines and newspapers such as GQ, Vice Media, USA Today, Seattle Weekly, and the Austin Chronicle.

== Music ==
Under the pseudonym of Warren Winters, Winterhalder formed the Warren Winters Band in the 1980s after fronting the Connecticut Dust Band during the late 1970s and early 1980s. Playing guitar and singing lead vocals, he used a group of studio musicians and his childhood friend Kurt Newman (drums) to record the As I Was debut album in 1984 on the Shovster Records label. In 1988, the Crossbar Hotel album was recorded at Grace Recording Studios in Connecticut with Warren Winters (guitar & lead vocals), Andy Rutman (guitar), Kurt Newman (drums), Lou Sabetta (keyboards) and Mario Figueroa (bass). On both albums, the song writing credits noted that all songs were written by Winterhalder.

In 1995, a Best Of Warren Winters CD was mastered and produced by Chris Westerman of Blackwater Sound in New Hampshire. Along with hit songs from the As I Was and Crossbar Hotel albums, the CD featured a few songs from his Connecticut Dust Band days and some unreleased tracks from studio sessions. While the music of the Warren Winters Band was once described as being somewhere between rock n roll and progressive country, a 2011 article in France compared the Warren Winters Band sound to Acey Stone, Circuit Rider and Justen O'Brien.

In February 2019, Kentucky-based Sophomore Lounge Records announced that a 30th anniversary limited edition vinyl LP record reissue of the Warren Winters Band Crossbar Hotel album would be released on April 5, 2019. Then And Now by the Warren Winters Band was released in March 2020; the record included previously unreleased songs written by Winterhalder that were recorded between 1974 and 2020.

== Bibliography ==
- Winterhalder, Edward (2025). A Wild Ride In The Fast Lane: A Collection Of True Stories And Tall Tales From My Life As An Outlaw Biker. Blockhead City. ISBN 979-8-2660994-2-5.
- —— (2025). Real Bikers Of North America: Men Who Rode With An Outlaw Motorcycle Club. Blockhead City. ISBN 979-8-3069988-5-5.
- —— (2022). Searching For My Identity (Volume 1): The Chronological Evolution Of A Troubled Adolescent To Outlaw Biker. Blockhead City. ISBN 979-8-9858817-0-7.
- —— (2022). Searching For My Identity (Volume 2): The Chronological Evolution Of An Outlaw Biker On The Road To Redemption. Blockhead City. ISBN 979-8-9858817-1-4.
- ——; De Clercq, Wil (2021). Biker Chicz: The Attraction Of Women To Motorcycles And Outlaw Bikers. Blockhead City. ISBN 978-1-0879115-2-6.
- ——; Parke, Iain (2021). The Ultimate Biker Anthology: An Introduction To Books About Motorcycle Clubs & Outlaw Bikers. Blockhead City. ISBN 979-8-4531602-4-2.
- ——; Teatum, Marc (2015). The Blue And Silver Shark: A Biker's Story. Blockhead City. ISBN 978-0-9899997-4-8.
- ——; Parke, Iain (2013). The Ultimate Biker Anthology. Blockhead City. ISBN 978-0-9899997-0-0.
- ——; Teatum, Marc (2012). The Moon Upstairs: A Biker's Story. Blockhead City. ISBN 978-0-9771747-8-2.
- ——; Teatum, Marc (2011). One Light Coming: A Biker's Story. Blockhead City. ISBN 978-09771747-5-1.
- ——; De Clercq, Wil (2010). Biker Chicz of North America. Blockhead City. ISBN 978-0-9771747-3-7.
- ——; Larson, James Richard (2010). The Mirror: A Biker's Story. Blockhead City. ISBN 978-0-9771747-2-0.
- ——; Veno, Arthur (2009). Biker Chicks: The Magnetic Attraction of Women to Bad Boys and Motorbikes. Allen & Unwin. ISBN 978-1-7417569-5-1.
- ——; Larson, James Richard (2009). All Roads Lead to Sturgis: A Biker's Story. Blockhead City. ISBN 978-0-9771747-1-3.
- ——; De Clercq, Wil (2008). The Assimilation: Rock Machine Become Bandidos - Bikers United Against the Hells Angels. ECW Press. ISBN 978-1-5502282-4-3.
- —— (2006). Out in Bad Standings: Inside the Bandidos Motorcycle Club - the Making of a Worldwide Dynasty. Blockhead City. ISBN 978-0-9771747-0-6.

== Discography ==
- At Long Last - LP (1980) – Connecticut Dust Band
- As I Was - LP (1984) – Warren Winters Band
- Crossbar Hotel - LP (1988) – Warren Winters Band
- Best Of Warren Winters - CD (1995) – Warren Winters Band
- Then And Now - LP (2020) – Warren Winters Band
