= Rock Machine Motorcycle Club =

Outlaw Motorcycle Club

Rock Machine MC
- Founded: 1986
- Founder: Salvatore Cazzetta
- Founded at: Montreal, Quebec, Canada
- Type: Outlaw motorcycle club
- Region served: Worldwide - Canada, United States, Australia, Germany, England Sweden, Norway, Denmark, France, Spain, Indonesia
- Members: Estimated to have 2,000 active members across the globe, plus thousands of associates
- Key people: Giovanni Cazzetta; Johnny Plescio; Paul "Sasquatch" Porter; Renaud Jomphe; Claude "Ti-Loup" Vézina; Marcel "Le Maire" Demers; Frédéric "Fred" Faucher; Kenneth "Bandit" Carman; Suat Erkose; Christian “Smiley” Espinoza
- Website: https://rockmachinemc.ca/

The Rock Machine Motorcycle Club (RMMC) or Rock Machine is an international outlaw motorcycle club founded in Montreal, Quebec, Canada in 1986. It has eighteen Canadian chapters spread across seven provinces. It also has nine chapters in the United States and eleven chapters in Australia, with chapters also located in 24 other countries. It was formed in 1986, by Salvatore Cazzetta and his brother Giovanni Cazzetta. The Rock Machine competed with the Hells Angels for control of the street-level narcotics trade in Quebec. The Quebec Biker War saw the Rock Machine form an alliance with a number of other organizations to face the Hells Angels. The conflict occurred between 1994 and 2002 and resulted in over 160 deaths and over 300 injured. An additional 100+ have been imprisoned.

Common nicknames for the organization include "R.M.", "Black & Platinum", "RMMC", and "1813". The official Rock Machine club motto is "A La Vie A La Mort", or "To the Life Until Death". The club also possesses a patch that reads "RMFFRM" which stands for "Rock Machine Forever, Forever Rock Machine", an extremely common traditional saying among individual outlaw motorcycle clubs.

The Rock Machine Motorcycle Club gained the status of a "hang-around" club in May 1999 and after eighteen months, became a probationary chapter of the Bandidos Motorcycle Club on 1 December 2000. Bandidos National Officer Edward Winterhalder was put in charge of overseeing the transition by Bandidos international president, George Wegers. The original version of the Rock Machine (1986–1999) in Canada changed their colors from black and platinum to red and gold in May 1999; their colors remained red and gold until they became "full-patch" Bandidos on 1 December 2001 in a "patch-over" ceremony at the Rock Machine's Kingston chapter clubhouse.

A second version of the Rock Machine was founded in 2008 in Winnipeg under the leadership of Sean "Crazy Dog" Brown, adopting the original black and platinum colors as their patch.

Since 2007, the club has spread across Canada and throughout several other countries worldwide, including the United States, Australia, Germany, Russia, Switzerland, Hungary, Belgium, New Zealand, Sweden, Serbia, Norway, France, South Africa, England, Spain, Georgia, Hong Kong, Kosovo, Kuwait, Armenia, Brazil, Indonesia, Thailand, Vietnam, Philippines and Turkey. As of 2022, the Rock Machine Motorcycle Club has established over 120 chapters on five continents. In the 2000s, the Rock Machine allied themselves with fellow international Canadian motorcycle club the Loners Motorcycle Club. In 2023 the Rock Machine chapter in Alaska feuded with the Hells Angels and the fight over the territory ended with the Hells Angels disbanding and surrendering the interior city of Fairbanks after nearly 40 years of domination. Members of the Hells Angels club began turning in their colors after rumored a Rock Machine member that goes by the alias “Sparks” allegedly attacked the now former president which ended in the president stepping down.

== The first incarnation ==
In approximately 1982, Salvatore Cazzetta was a member of the SS, a white supremacist motorcycle gang based in Pointe-aux-Trembles, on the eastern tip of the Island of Montreal. Fellow SS member Maurice Boucher became friends with Cazzetta and as leaders of the club, the pair became candidates to join the Hells Angels when that club expanded into Canada.

Réjean Lessard, the president of The Sorel chapter of the Hells Angels suspected Laval chapter was interfering with drug profits through personal use of products intended for sale. In the Lennoxville massacre, five members of the Laval chapter were killed. Divers located the decomposing bodies of the victims at the bottom of the St. Lawrence River, wrapped in sleeping bags and tied to weightlifting plates, two months after the party. The event became known as the "Lennoxville massacre," and its extreme nature earned the Quebec chapter of the Hells Angels a notorious reputation. Cazzetta considered the event an unforgivable breach of the outlaw code and, rather than joining the Hells Angels, in 1986 formed his own club, the Rock Machine, with his brother Giovanni and Paul Porter. The journalist Jerry Langton: "The Cazzettas and Porter recruited a number of street toughs-including a few former Outlaws and guys who had been rejected by the Hells Angels-to form a new group called the Rock Machine. In the beginning they were a gang, but not a motorcycle gang. Of course, the Cazeettas, Porter and a few others rode Harleys, but the vast majority didn't". Cazzetta spoke fluent French, English and Italian and had contacts with the Rizzuto crime family, the West End Gang, and the Dubois Gang. Giovanni Cazzetta would hold the position of second-in-command. Only Salvatore would hold more influence.

Future Rock Machine National President Fred Faucher later said, "Sal once told me, 'Those guys (Hells Angels), they operate their club in such a way that I didn't want to join them'". The founding members of the Rock Machine were Salvatore Cazzettta, his younger brother Giovanni and Paul "Sasquatch" Porter. Other founding members included, Johnny Plescio, Andrew "Curly" Sauvageau, Renaud Jomphe, Gilles Lambert, Martin Bourget, Richard "Bam Bam" Lagacé, Serge Pinel and several others. The majority of the Rock Machine were former members of the Merciless Riders, the Executeurs and the SS. The Rock Machine made its living via the sale of narcotics and other prohibited goods. As the Rock Machine charged considerably less for cocaine than the Hells Angels, the gang won much market share in the Montreal area. The Hells Angels had been badly weakened by the Lennoxville massacre, which to the convictions of a number of Hells Angels in the late 1980s. Initially Rock Machine members chose not to wear Hells Angels-style leather vests that could easily identify members, and instead wore rings displaying an eagle insignia (this would last until 1995, with the adoption of three-piece vests).

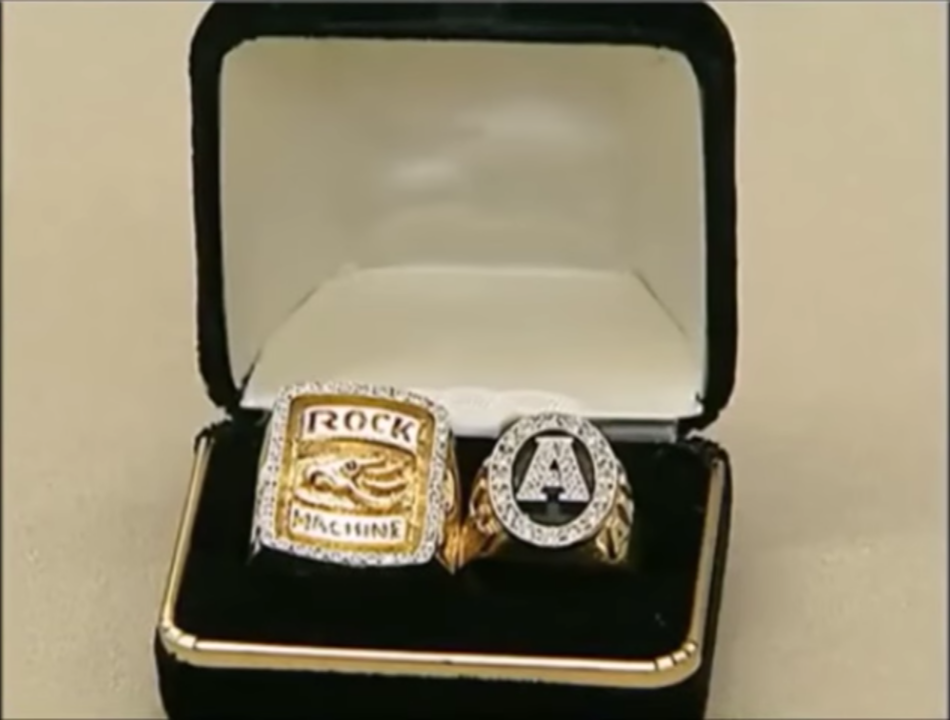
Gold ring given to members of the Rock Machine

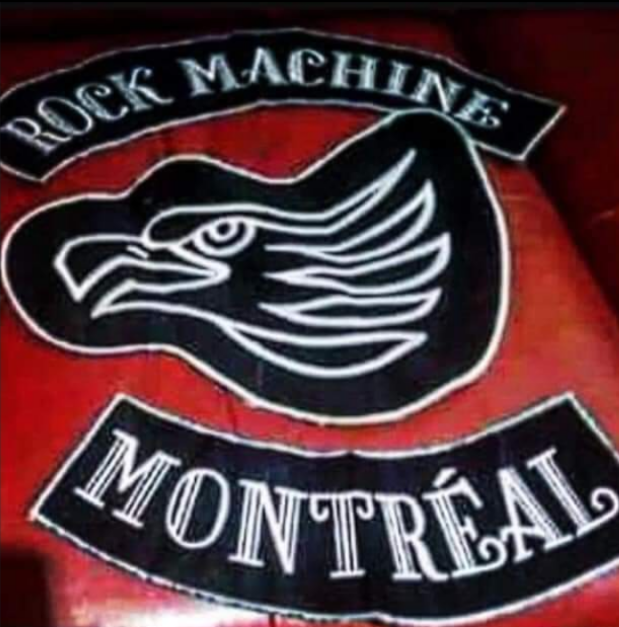
The Rock Machine's first patch (1995)

The official Rock Machine club motto is "A La Vie A La Mort", or "To the Life Until Death". The club the possesses a patch that reads "RMFFRM" which stands for "Rock Machine Forever, Forever Rock Machine", an extremely common thing among outlaw motorcycle clubs.

In April 1992, Giovanni Cazzetta was arrested by police and charged with trafficking narcotics, police found him to be in position of three kilograms (7 lb) of cocaine worth around $120,000 (modern equivalent when adjusting for inflation of $246,000 US). He was forced to plead guilty to four charges the following spring and was sentenced to four years in prison. Giovanni was released in 1997 and briefly participated in the conflict that was to come. Marice Boucher, was released after finishing a forty-month sentence for armed sexual assault, joined the Hells Angels and was subsequently promoted within the club's ranks. The Hells Angels and Rock Machine co-existed peacefully for many years, a situation that, according to police officials, was due to Boucher's respect for his friend, Cazzetta and the latter's connections with the Quebec Mafia, the only organized crime group that the motorcycle gangs were unwilling to attack.

== Quebec Biker war ==
Founder of the Rock Machine Motorcycle Club, Salvatore Cazzetta was arrested at a pitbull farm located in Fort Erie, Ontario during 1994. He was charged with attempting to import more than eleven tons (22,000lbs) of cocaine valued at an estimated 275 million dollars US (adjusting for inflation the 2021 value is $513,238,697). Claude Vézina, who was president of the Quebec City chapter at the time, became the new National President of the Rock Machine. Renaud Jomphe was made president of the Montreal chapter, while Marcel Demers became the president of the Quebec City chapter until eventually opening the Beauport chapter in late 1996.

Recently promoted Hells Angels Montreal President Boucher began to increase pressure on the Rock Machine shortly after the arrest, which initiated the Quebec Biker war. The local Rock Machine Motorcycle Club formed an affiliation, the Alliance, with Montreal crime families such as the Pelletier Clan, Dark Circle and other independent dealers who wished to resist the Hells Angels' attempts to establish a monopoly on street-level drug trade in the city. A violent turf war ensued with the Hells Angels. The Rock Machine MC, its support clubs and the Pelletier Clan would provide manpower while the Dark Circle would provide the funding. The Dark Circle's leadership was ruled by a committee of five. The chairman was Michel Duclos.

Boucher organized "puppet clubs" to persuade Rock Machine-controlled bars and their resident drug dealers to surrender their illegal drug business. This led to the creation of the Palmers MC, a Rock Machine MC support club with chapters in Montreal and Quebec City. It was created to counter Hell's Angels allies, the Rockers MC, Evil ones and Death Riders MC support clubs. It was led and organized by Rock Machine members Jean "Le Francais" Duquaire and André "Dédé" Désormeaux, who was initially a member of the Dark Circle but joined the Rock Machine. These two were described as the grandfathers of the Palmers MC, all of whose members would be patched into the Rock Machine in 2000. The starting point of the conflict is disputed; however, on 13 July 1994, three members of the Rock Machine entered a business in downtown Montreal. They assassinated Pierre Daoust, a member of a Hells Angel support club, the Death Riders Motorcycle Club. Once it was confirmed they had the right target, he was shot 16 times in the head and torso.

There was very little coverage of this incident, but many in Montreal's underground knew that the Rock Machine was defending its territory, months before the death of Daoust. The members of the Alliance (Rock Machine MC, Pelletier Clan, the Dark Circle) as well as other individual narcotics dealers and street gangs met to discuss a united front against the Hells Angels after they gave the narcotics community of Quebec an ultimatum to have them as their mandatory supplier of all contraband goods and narcotics. This offer was refused and the Alliance was formed; due to the Hells Angels' "monopolistic attitude", they had decided to take the initiative and strike first.

A day after on 14 July 1994, The Rock Machine attempted to assassinate Normand Robitaille, a member of Hells Angels support club the Rockers MC and a future and prominent member of the Hells Angels. The attempt failed and Quebec police announced that they had arrested five members of the Rock Machine Motorcycle Club for planning to bomb the Evil Ones MC clubhouse which was also aligned with the Hells Angels.

With current knowledge of events due to information from Sylvain Boulanger, it is known that on 15 July 1994, the hierarchy of the Hells Angels in Quebec held emergency meetings in the city of Longueuil, Quebec. All four chapters in Quebec at the time were present (Montreal, Quebec City, Trois-Rivières and Sherbrooke). There was also a meeting at Hells Angels bunker during this period of time. All chapters had to vote on whether they would participate in the conflict against the Rock Machine and their alliance. All four chapters agreed and the club began to prepare for the long conflict ahead. The Hells Angels was an international organization and received aid from all over the country and internationally, giving them more support than the Rock Machine.

On 19 October 1994, a local drug dealer Maurice Lavoie was gunned down in his car and his girlfriend was wounded. Lavoie had previously been buying his wares from the Pelletier Clan associated with the Rock Machine, but had recently switched to the Hells Angels, and as a result the Pelletier Clan hired a hitman named Patrick Call to kill Lavoie.

On 28 October 1994, Sylvain Pelletier, the leader of the Pelletier Clan, was killed by the Hells Angels, who threatened to murder any drug dealer who did not buy their supplies from them. After these killings, an increasingly murderous struggle for the control of the drug trade in Montreal began between the Hells Angels and the Rock Machine that would see 20 dead before the end of 1994.

After Pelletier was killed, the independent drug dealers of Montreal formed the "Alliance to fight the Angels" headed by his younger brother, Harold Pelletier, whose first act was an attempt to assassinate Boucher in November 1994. Another member of the Pelletier Clan, Martin Simard, purchased enough stolen dynamite to fill a truck, which was left near Boucher's favorite restaurant by Alliance member Martin Pellerin. The plan was to set off the explosives by remote control when Boucher arrived, killing him and everybody else in the restaurant, but a Montreal parking officer noticed the truck was parked illegally and had it towed, thus unknowingly foiling the plot.

On 24 June 1995, Boucher founded the Nomads, an elite chapter of the Angels, that unlike the other chapters, had no geographical limit and were to operate all over Canada. To join the Nomads, applicants were required to commit murders, which ensured that no undercover police agents could enter the Nomads chapter. Additionally, only the highest-quality Angels who had proven themselves could join the Nomads.

On 13 August 1995, a Jeep wired with a remote-controlled bomb exploded, killing Hells Angels associate Marc Dube and an 11-year-old boy, Daniel Desrochers, who was playing in a nearby schoolyard. An Interpol informant claimed that the plan was created and facilitated by Boucher to earn back public credit. The first full-patch Hells Angels member was shot to death entering his car at a shopping mall a month later. Nine bombs went off around the province during his funeral, targeting several Hells Angels businesses and properties. This series of violence related to Operation Wolverine, a police crackdown on both groups in which 130 were arrested.

in October 1995, Harold Pelletier, one of the heads of the Pelletier Clan (member of the Alliance), turned himself in to the Sûreté du Québec, confessing that on the night of 7 August 1983, he had murdered a drug dealer named Michel Beaulieu who was behind in his payments to the Pelletier Clan. He asked that the police provide him with protection from the Angels in exchange for more information about his crimes.

Ultimately, Pelletier confessed to committing 17 murders between 1983 and 1995, yet he was convicted only of the murder of Beaulieu. His murder of Beaulieu was classified as second degree murder, despite the fact Beaulieu had fallen asleep after Pelletier got him drunk before he was shot. Since the murder was premeditated, it should have been classified as a first degree murder.

Steinert was the biggest pimp in Montreal, owning the Sensations escort service, whose office in Montreal was destroyed in a case of arson in August 1996 by the Rock Machine.

In his plea bargain struck in June 1996, Pelletier was sentenced to life imprisonment with a promise that he receive full parole after 10 years served, in exchange for which he shared all he knew about the Montreal underworld. The Crown justified the plea bargain with Pelletier, given that he was guilty of 17 murders, on the grounds he was a "mine of information" about the underworld of Montreal. Pelletier's motives for striking a plea bargain was that the "Alliance against the Angels" was collapsing with Alliance members defecting over to the Angels, and he wanted Crown protection from the Angels. However, Pelletier violated the terms of his plea bargain, under which he promised not to commit any more crimes, when he was caught in 2002 attempting to bribe another prison inmate to kill a prisoner whom he disliked, allowing the Crown to revoke its agreement. Pelletier was not released in June 2006, as had been promised 10 years earlier. He finally received full parole in December 2013 after he completed his high school equivalency degree, started attending Alcoholics Anonymous meetings, and demonstrated an ability to get along with penitentiary staff.

On 18 October 1996. president of the Rock Machine Montreal chapter, Renaud Jomphe, was shot and killed. He was seated with fellow club members Christian Deschenes and Raymond Laureau in a booth at the rear of a Chinese restaurant known as Restaurant Kim Hoa, located on Wellington Street. A man entered the establishment, approached the table, fired several shots, and fled out the rear of the building. Jomphe and Deschenes were killed, while Laureau was wounded in the shoulder. One of the Paradis brothers, Peter Paradis, would succeed Jomphe as president of the Montreal chapter, taking over much of his business in the suburb of Verdun.

In November 1996, the Rock Machine planted a bomb in the old Hells Angels bunker in St. Nicholas and the residential neighborhood where it was located was shaken by the immense force of the blast. The bunker received significant damage.

On 28 March 1997, Rocker member Aimé Simard, stating he was acting under the orders of the Rocker president, a man known as Gregory "Pissaro" Wooley, murdered Rock Machine member Jean-Marc Caissy as he entered a Montreal arena to play hockey with his friends.

In early 1997, Giovanni Cazzetta was released from prison and returned to the Rock Machine. Claude Vézina willingly stepped down and Giovanni was given the position of national president in his brother's absence. He would lead the club through the conflict until May 1997. In May, Giovanni was subject to a police sting in which a man from Alberta attempted to purchase 15 kilos (30 lb) of cocaine (valued at $600,000; adjusting for inflation, the modern equivalent of $1,132,000). This individual turned out to be an informant for the crown. The mules Frank Bonneville and Donald Waite, who delivered the cocaine to the informant, were arrested and the narcotics were seized by police, Matticks, Bonneville and Waite pleaded guilty on 17 June 1997, and were sentenced to three, four, and two years respectively. Claude Vézina was momentarily reinstated as national president of the Rock Machine. Giovanni attempted to fight the charges brought against him, but he lost these appeals and was sentenced to five years prison time in April 1998. Maria Cazzetta, Giovanni's sister, and Suzanne Poudrier received one year conditional sentences.

On 19 May 1997, Prominent Rock Machine member Serge Cyr was placed under arrest and charged with conspiracy along with 13 others including members of the Rock Machine, Pelletier Clan and Palmers MC for planning the murder of Hells Angels president Maurice "Mom" Boucher. In 1994, a stolen van loaded with explosives was discovered outside the Cri-Cri restaurant on St. Catherine Street, the restaurant was an establishment where Boucher often ate. Cyr was released soon after, with the condition that he report to police once a week, which he never did. Cyr gained a reputation from this, and after the December 2000 arrests, he was promoted to president of the Montreal chapter.

On 21 May 1997, Claude Vézina and his sergeant-at-arms Dany "Le Gros" Légaré were both charged with the trafficking of narcotics. In order to conduct his arrest, police had to sneak by guard dogs that he had located on his property; they entered his home and arrested him in his bedroom. This was all the result of a sting operation set up by the Quebec police. A police informant had completed seven transactions of narcotics with the two members of Rock Machine, during a five-month period. The massive raid launched by authorities as part of Operation Carcajou resulted in the seizure of a laboratory where narcotics such as PCP and methamphetamine were produced. $1,500,000 worth of various other narcotics, over 325 kg (716.5 lbs) of dynamite along with detonators, seven pistols, two fully automatic machine guns, three semi-automatic carbines and a pistol suppressor. After the arrest of Vézina, Frédéric Faucher became the Rock Machine's new national president on 11 September 1997, Alain "Red Tomato" Brunette was promoted to president of the Quebec City chapter.

In mid-1997, an imprisoned Hells Angel, Denis Houle, was the victim of an unsuccessful assassination attempt when a Rock Machine member opened fire on him from beyond the prison fence. The resulting investigation first alerted the public to the existence of the Dark Circle, and it was reported that the Hells Angels would pay well for information identifying the members of the Dark Circle. Over the next two years, two members of the Dark Circle were murdered by the Hells Angels while a third escaped when the Hells Angels shot and killed the wrong Serge.

As the war turned into a battle of attrition the Hells Angels began to gain the upper hand as ever-increasing levels of support poured in from around Canada and internationally, but at the same time, the Great Nordic Biker War was taking place, and the Rock Machine was impressed with the way that the Scandinavian branches of the Bandidos held their own against the Scandinavian branches of the Hells Angels. In June 1997, the three leaders of the Rock Machine, Fred Faucher, Johnny Plescio, and Robert "Tout Tout" Léger, went to Stockholm to seek support from the Swedish branch of the Bandidos, but were expelled by the Swedish police, who declared that they did not want Canadian bikers in their country.

Faucher, had been the President of the Rock Machine Quebec City chapter prior to his promotion to National President, he had gained wide attention in underworld circles by blowing up the Hells Angels clubhouse in Quebec City in February 1997 and after the Rock Machine's leader Claude "Ti-Loup" Vézina was arrested for drug smuggling, he became the Rock Machine's new leader on 11 September 1997. Faucher decided the best hope for the Rock Machine was to have the club absorbed into the Bandidos, the second-largest outlaw biker club in the world.

On 23 August 1998, a team of Rock Machine killers consisting of Frédéric Faucher, Gerald Gallant, and Marcel Demers rode by on their motorcycles and gunned down Paolo Cotroni in his driveway. Cotroni was a member of the Calabrian 'Ndrangheta Cotroni crime family who were the rivals of the Sicilian Mafia Rizzuto crime family. Cotroni was killed partly to gain the favor of the Rizzutos and partly because he was a friend of Boucher.

On 8 September 1998, Johnny Plescio, a founding member of the Rock Machine, was at his Laval home watching television when his cable was severed. As he rose to see what was wrong with his television, 27 bullets went through Plescios's living room window, 16 of which struck him. At Plescio's funeral, a flower arrangement appeared bearing the word Bandidos, which was the first sign that the Bandidos Motorcycle Club of Texas was taking an interest in the Rock Machine.

On 28 October 1998. Police arrested 25 Rock Machine members and associates as they were eating dinner in the restaurant of a downtown hotel. The men were forced to lie facedown on the ground, they were searched, and then placed under arrest. Richard Lagacé and Denis Belleau were among those arrested. Many were freed the next day, after swearing to stay away from the others who were picked up by police.

Disaster struck the Dark Circle when one of their number, Salvatore Brunnettii, a restaurateur, bar owner and drug dealer, defected to the Hells Angels and gave them a list of the remaining members of the Dark Circle. This basically led to their collapse, leaving the Rock Machine and fragmented members of the "Alliance" to face the Hells Angels and their support clubs.

By 1999 the Rock Machine MC were seriously looking to align itself with longtime Hells Angels rivals the Bandidos Motorcycle Club as the other factions in the Alliance had been devastated, with the Rock Machine itself receiving substantial losses. In May 1999 the Rock Machine Motorcycle Club became a "hang-around" club for the Bandidos.

On 17 April 2000, Normand Hamel, one of the Nomads, was killed when attempting to flee from Rock Machine assassins in a Laval parking lot while he and his wife were taking his son to the doctor. He was the most senior member of the Hells Angels killed during the conflict. On 12 May 2000, the Angels tried to kill the two Rock Machine members, Tony Duguay and Denis Boucher, suspected of killing Hamel, leading to a wild car crash, during which Duguay took bullet wounds to his arms, right hand, and thigh. About forty police officers from the Carcajou squad raided the Rock Machine chapter in Beauport but found nothing worthwhile. In June 2000, the Rock Machine set up in Ontario began recruiting former members of the Outlaws Motorcycle Club.

In July 2000, Boucher's plans to set up an internet company were derailed when Robert "Bob" Savard, the loan shark who charged 52% interest on the loans he made to the desperate and needy, was gunned down at the Déjeuners Eggstra! restaurant in the north end of Montreal. Savard had been a Hells Angels associate for several years and was considered a right-hand man for Boucher. Savard's dinner companion, Normand Descoteaux, a hockey player turned loan shark, was also a target, but he survived by grabbing a waitress, Hélène Brunet, and using her as an involuntary human shield, ensuring that she took four bullets meant for him. Despite the fact that Brunet took bullets in her arms, legs and shin, Descoteaux was not charged. The shooter's were infamous Canadian hitman, Gerald Gallant and an unidentified associate of his. Gallant was employed by Michel Duclos, the leader of the Dark Circle, and also frequently carried out contracts for the Rock Machine during the conflict with the Hells Angels, from 1980 to 2003, he was responsible for 28 murders and 13 attempted murders. His most active years were during the Quebec Biker War, where he killed two members of Hells Angels support clubs in 1997; a third survived an assassination attempt. In 1998 he eliminated five men, including Paul Cotroni Jr., son of deposed mob boss Frank Cotroni, making this his most prominent year as a hitman. He also at times worked for the Irish-Canadian West End Gang.

During this period both groups started to expand into Ontario, with both opening several clubhouses. The Rock Machine opened three chapters in Ontario (Toronto, Kingston and Niagara Falls). The Loners had aligned themselves with the Rock Machine, holding a party in Toronto in June 2000 that was attended by dozens of "machinists", as the Rock Machine are known in outlaw biker circles. Also in June 2000 before the Hells Angels. Not wanting to lose ground to the Rock Machine in the province, Hells Angels opened its first clubhouse and in 2000, and gave a limited time offer to outlaw motorcycle clubs in Ontario (especially Satan's Choice and the Para-Dice Riders). There would be no probationary period for Hells Angels club membership and all members would receive full-patch. This resulted in 168 members of the Para-Dice Riders, Satan's Choice, Lobos and Last Chance "patching" to the Angels. Overnight the Hells Angels went from one chapter in Ontario to 14, giving them a massive advantage in the province. This gave the Hells Angels 29 chapters in total, with 418 full-patch members in Quebec, Ontario, Nova Scotia, Manitoba, Saskatchewan, Alberta and British Columbia.

On 6 December 2000, 255 police officers tracked and arrested 16 Rock Machine members and associates on narcotics trafficking charges. The "ring", operated by Marcel Demers, leader of the Beauport chapter and National President Fred Faucher of the Quebec City chapter, were accused of distributing more than two kilograms (4 lb) of cocaine a month and generated almost $5 million in profits annually (the modern equivalent of $8,347,967). Alain Brunette was promoted to the position of national president, until he became the first president of Bandidos Canada on 1 December 2001. Jean-Claude Belanger replaced Brunette as president of the Quebec City chapter. Robert Léger would head the Beauport chapter until his death. Also in December 2000, the Rock Machine officially became a probationary club of the Bandidos. Seeing the division this caused, the Hells Angels approached the Alliance with the offer of a ceasefire brokered by the Rizzuto crime family, which was accepted. The truce had an ulterior motive for the Hells Angels, as they hoped to halt the expansion of the Bandidos in Canada, especially Ontario. The Hells Angels also convinced members of the Rock Machine who did not agree with the "patch-over" to join them. The truce lasted for only a brief period before hostilities continued.

In December 2000, most of the Rock Machine's Ontario members joined the Hells Angels. The Hells Angels national president, Walter Stadnick, offered Hells Angels membership to the Rock Machine's Kingston and Toronto chapters while excluding the London chapter, saying that the members of the London chapter were unqualified to be Hells Angels. Most of the Ontario members of the Rock Machine took up Stadnick's offer as it was felt that the Bandidos patch with its cartoonish drawing of a Mexican bandit was "silly". Furthermore, Stadnick offered Hells Angels membership on a "patch-for-patch" basis, allowing members to trade their current patches for equivalent Hells Angels, while the Bandidos required new members to take a reduction in rank. Paul "Sasquatch" Porter, a founding member of the Rock Machine and the president of their Kingston chapter, wrote on the wall of the clubhouse: "Hello to all the RMMC, I wish you the best with your new colors! Bye my brothers!" Porter became the president of the Hells Angels' new Ottawa chapter. The fact that the Hells Angels had conspired to kill Porter when he was a member of the Rock Machine did not stop him from defecting.

Regardless of the prior issues, on 1 December 2001, the Rock Machine Motorcycle Club became official members of the Bandidos Canada in a "patch-over" ceremony at the Rock Machine's Kingston chapter club house. The Bandidos Canada inherited seven new chapters (Montreal, Quebec City, Point-Aux-Trembles, Beauport, Toronto, Kingston and Niagara Falls). On 28 March of the same year, a massive investigation by Canadian authorities dubbed Operation Springtime was launched against the Hells Angels. The raids resulted in the arrests of 138 members of the Hells Angels, including Maurice Boucher himself and associates connected with the motorcycle club. This brought about a power vacuum in the country's narcotics market.

The Bandidos Canada were looking to take advantage of this opportunity to regain territory lost and take new territory from the Hells Angels. However, a concurrent investigation, Operation Amigo, was underway targeting the Bandidos Canada operations. This operation had initially gone under a different title and was created to target the Rock Machine as a result of the conflict in Quebec. When The Rock Machine patched over to the Bandidos they became the main focus. On 5 June 2002, raids led to the arrests of 62 members of the Bandidos Canada (Rock Machine) including all of its Quebec manpower and many other associates. This put an end to the conflict as it was the first time since the start of the war that both sides had large numbers of men and their respective leaders in custody and facing charges. All in all it is the deadliest recorded biker conflict in history, with over 162 dead, over 300 wounded, 100 plus arrested and 20 people missing. It cost the government of Canada and Quebec millions of dollars in damages, with 84 bombings and 130 cases of arson.

== Second incarnation ==
In 2007, the former Winnipeg chapter of the Bandidos renamed themselves the Rock Machine. After the first president of the Winnipeg Bandido chapter, Michael Sandham, was arrested in June 2006, he was replaced as president by Ron Burling, who became the driving force behind the new Rock Machine.

Typical of the members of the Rock Machine was the president of the Winnipeg chapter, Ron Burling, described by the journalist Jerry Langton as a man with a shaven head, bushy goatee beard, his entire body covered in tattoos except for his face, and "physically huge". Burling's Facebook profile described him as "a member of the Rock Machine Nomads" and his occupation as "Edmonton Maximum Security Penitentiary General Population". He had been convicted of a brazen kidnapping and assault in Toronto. On 8 February 2005, as a member of the Bandidos, Burling smashed through the window of a car to yank out a drug dealer named Adam Amundsen. Burling then beat Amundsen for several hours with a baseball bat and his fists to encourage him to pay a $6,000 drug debt owned to the Bandidos. Burling was convicted of assault and kidnapping, and threatened both the judge and the crown attorneys with violence when his appeal was quashed. Burling tried to lift the bench to throw at somebody, but was tasered by the court marshals. Burling was one of the founding members of the new Rock Machine in 2008. Langton mocked the claims that the second Rock Machine had no connections with criminality, noting that Burling had joined the Rock Machine while he was in prison for assault..

On 19 September 2008, two Australian men with criminal records, Michael Xanthoudakis and Eneliko Sabine, were arrested at Winnipeg airport, and it was revealed that the duo had gone to Winnipeg to join the Rock Machine. On 1 October 2008, the Rock Machine officially announced its existence to the media. The spokesman for the Rock Machine claimed it had 75 members, but none in Quebec "out of respect for the Hells Angels". The Quebec biker war had made the name Rock Machine well known and a chapter had founded in Australia. The claims of the Rock Machine to have a chapter in Daytona Beach, Florida seems to have no foundation in reality. The party that was supposed to announce the new Rock Machine was attended by only three people. The headquarters of the new Rock Machine is Winnipeg, not Montreal. On 3 June 2009, Jean Paul Beaumont, the sergeant-at-arms of the Winnipeg chapter was arrested for having two assault rifles in his house. On 1 December 2009, the Royal Canadian Mounted Police launched Project Divide and arrested 34 people who were all Hells Angels or Zig Zag Crew members. The arrests allowed the Rock Machine to fill the vacuum and the a puppet gang, the Vendettas MC, was founded in early 2010. The brutal way that the Winnipeg Hells Angels chapter operated had a number of enemies who all joined the Winnipeg chapter of the Rock Machine such as Gregg Hannibal and Billy Bowden, a former Hells Angel.

In March 2010, the Winnipeg police bugged a warehouse on Sargent Avenue which turned to be used by the Rock Machine to sell cocaine. Ronald King of the Rock Machine was arrested and found to be carrying $463, 000 in cash on him. In September 2010, a major division in the Rock Machine emerged about whatever the group should try to open a chapter in Montreal. Jamie "J.C." Korne, the vice president of the Winnipeg chapter was against opening a chapter in Montreal under the grounds that it was too dangerous, which led to his expulsion on 2 September 2010. Sean "Dog" Brown, the national president of the Rock Machine was deposed in November 2010 over the question of the Montreal chapter and was replaced by Joseph "Critical J" Strachan, who at the age of 40 still lived at home with his parents. On 15 December 2010, Andrew Block, a Rock Machine biker, was murdered in Edmonton.

On 22 March 2011, a Rock Machine biker, Ashley Sandison, contracted his estranged wife despite a restraining order forbidding him from contacting her, which led a shoot-out with the police who had arrived at the house of Mrs. Sandison. On 29 June 2011, the home of Strachan's parents in Winnipeg were destroyed in a case of arson after Molotov cocktail was tossed into the house. On 10 July 2011, a business associated with the Hells Angels and the home of a Redlined Support Crew (Hells Angels puppet gang) were burned down. On 12 July 2011, the house of a Redlined Support Crew member was shot up and a 14-year-old boy was wounded. On 9 August 2011, the police arrested two members of the Vendettas, Guy Stevenson and Joseph Choken, for attempting to kill a Hells Angel associate. On 11 August 2011, the home of another Redlined Support Crew member was burned down in a case of arson. On 12 August 2011, the tattoo shop owned by Wayne Nuytten, a Hells Angels associate was burned down in another case of arson. Two Rock Machine members, Taylor Morrision and Shaine Stodgell, were convicted of the arson attacks.

On 2 February 2012, the police launched Operation Deplete, which to the seizure of 6, 912 grams (2 lb) of cocaine, 465 grams (1 lb) of crack cocaine, 272 grams (10 oz) of methamphetamine, 9, 811 Ecstasy pills and 501 tablets of oxycodone. Arrested were two Rock Machine members, Billy Bowden and Joshua Lyons. On 14 October 2012, Beaumont was murdered in prison. On 30 January 2013, the Rock Machine national president Strachan was arrested at his parents house on charges of drug trafficking. Also arrested were Rock Machine "full patch" members Todd Murray, John Curwin, and Cameron Hemminger along with the "prospects' Donny Syraxa, Danny Tran, Patrcik La, Chris Camara, Tegveer Sinh Gill an Richard Lund. The police seized 16 pounds of cocaine along with six guns, two pipe bombs and ammunition. In a plea bargain with the Crown on 13 June 2013, Strahan made guilty pleas to the charges of drug trafficking and gangsterism.

=== Allies ===
- Outlaws Motorcycle Club - The Outlaws motorcycle club had initially given minor support to the Rock Machine during the Quebec Biker War, The Outlaws were also fighting a conflict with the Hell's Angels during this period. An official alliance would be formed between the resurrected Rock Machine and the Outlaws in Manitoba in 2011.
- Gremium Motorcycle Club - During the club's expansion into Europe, it made an alliance with Gremium MC, one of the largest motorcycle clubs in Germany.
- Loners Motorcycle Club - A fellow Canadian-based international motorcycle club, an alliance between the two was established in the 2010s.
- Vendettas Motorcycle Club - A RMMC created support club that was founded in Winnipeg, Manitoba. Serves as an international support club for the Rock Machine with chapters in Canada, Australia and Russia.
- Manitoba Warriors - A Native-Canadian gang based in the Canada's prairies, an alliance was formed between the two groups during Rock Machine's expansion into Western Canada in 2008.
- Bandidos (formerly, 1999–2006) - The Rock Machine became a chapter of the Bandidos in mid-1999. After 18 months, they became an official probationary club. All members of the Rock Machine were patched into the Bandidos on 6 January 2001. They would remain as a single entity until the events of the Shedden Massacre and the subsequent closure of the Bandidos MC Canada. The Rock Machine was reestablished by former Bandidos, and disgruntled members of the Mongols Motorcycle Club.

=== Rivals ===
- Hells Angels (1986–2002) - The Hells Angels' actions during the Lennoxville massacre directly led to the creation of the Rock Machine Motorcycle Club itself. Despite this, the two clubs existed in relative harmony until the 1994 arrest of Rock Machine President, Salvatore Cazzetta. From 1994 to 2002, the Rock Machine and the Hells Angels engaged in the deadliest motorcycle conflict in history. This cemented their rivalry. There have been several sporadic incidents since then.
- Rebels Motorcycle Club - The rivalry between the Rock Machine and the Rebels Motorcycle Club started when the Canadian club expanded into Australia. This saw the beginning of the Rock Machine-Rebels conflict.
- Red Devils Motorcycle Club - the Red Devils are the official support club of the Hells Angels, they have had several incidents with the Rock Machine.
- Bandidos Motorcycle Club (2011–present) - Tensions between the Bandidos and Rock Machine started in the mid-2000s, with the Shedden Massacre and the dissolution of the Bandidos Canada driving a wedge between the reemerging Rock Machine and their former ally. The rivalry escalated into conflict in 2011, when the two clubs clashed for control of the German city of Ulm. There has since been several conflicts fought between the two groups in multiple countries.
- WolfSSChanze Faction - a splinter faction of the Rock Machine led by Suat Erköse. The faction changed their emblem in 2022.

=== Meeting with the Pagans ===
For decades the Pagans Motorcycle Club had looked north to Canada for possibility of expansion. It also found the idea of supporting Hells Angels rivals beneficial. The Rock Machine Motorcycle Club, a Canadian-based international motorcycle club with chapters all over the world, has fought several conflicts with the Hells Angels including the Quebec Biker War, the deadliest motorcycle conflict in history. The Pagans deeply respected these feats and sought to establish a relationship with the Rock Machine. In 2011, dozens of the Pagans traveled to the Canadian province of New Brunswick to meet with the several chapters of the Rock Machine and other locals. At the time New Brunswick was a Canadian province that had little outlaw motorcycle influence. The meeting was to consolidate a friendship and probe the province for expansion. However, in 2018, Pagans member, Andrew "Chef" Glick revealed that the group had abandoned its plans at expansion North, they cited Canada's anti-biker laws but also a large part of the reason was that Canadian Hells Angels are considered particularly violent members of the outlaw biker – or "one percenter" – community, Glick said in an interview.

"In Canada and Australia, that's where the heaviest (toughest) one per centers are," Glick said. "Being a one per center in Canada, I would say is a little more dangerous than being a one per center in the U.S." New Jersey bikers are tough, but "not near as violent as what I've seen and read (about) in Montreal and Toronto."

== Membership ==
Today the Rock Machine Motorcycle Club's membership is open to anyone but not to everyone.

=== Earning membership and rules ===
Like most other Outlaw motorcycle clubs, members must own and operate a North American or British-made motorcycle with an engine of at least 1000cc and have sufficient riding skills not to be a danger to themselves or others. In order to become a Rock Machine prospect the rules are strict. All candidates undergo an extensive background check, must have the right set of personal qualities & prove their loyalty to the club.

=== Past members ===
Former members of the club included Salvatore Cazzetta, Giovanni Cazzetta, Claude Vézina, Paul Porter, Andrew Sauvageau, Marcel Demers, Richard "Bam-Bam" Lagacé, Johnny Plescio, Tony Plescio, Renaud Jomphe (the former president of the Montreal chapter), Martin Bourget, Serge Pinel, Frédéric Faucher, Alain Brunette (who would become the first national president of the Canadian Bandidos in 2001), Jean Paul Beaumont, and Peter Paradis (who became its first member to turn crown's evidence).

The Rock Machine was merged with the Bandidos Motorcycle Club on 6 January 2001, in a patch-over ceremony located at the Rock Machine's Kingston chapter clubhouse. It was overseen by high-ranking Bandidos member Edward Winterhalder. They remained Bandidos for seven years. Around ten Rock Machine members at the time joined their former arch-enemy, the Hells Angels, due to the Bandidos refusal to grant full members status to "Full-Patch" members of the Rock Machine forcing them to become probationary members of the Bandidos and take a reduction in ranking, this angered some members along with abandoning the Rock machine namesake for a Texas-based entity, it was felt by some that the Bandidos patch with its cartoonish drawing of a Mexican bandit was "silly". Furthermore, Stadnick offered Hells Angels membership on a "patch-for-patch" basis, allowing members to trade their current patches for equivalent Hells Angels. Many Rock Machine had gained respect from the Hells Angels that they had faced during the conflict and saw them as a better alternative.

Notable members who defected to the Angels included original members Paul Porter and Andrew Sauvageau. "Full-Patch" members Gilles Lambert, Nelson Fernandes, Bruce Doran (who founded the Kingston chapter), and Fred Faucher's brother Jean Judes Faucher. Fernandes would die of cancer within months of becoming a Hells Angel. Upon his release, club founder Salvatore Cazzetta joined Hells Angels in 2005, as the Rock Machine had merged with the Bandidos and was no longer active at the time.

== Chapters worldwide ==
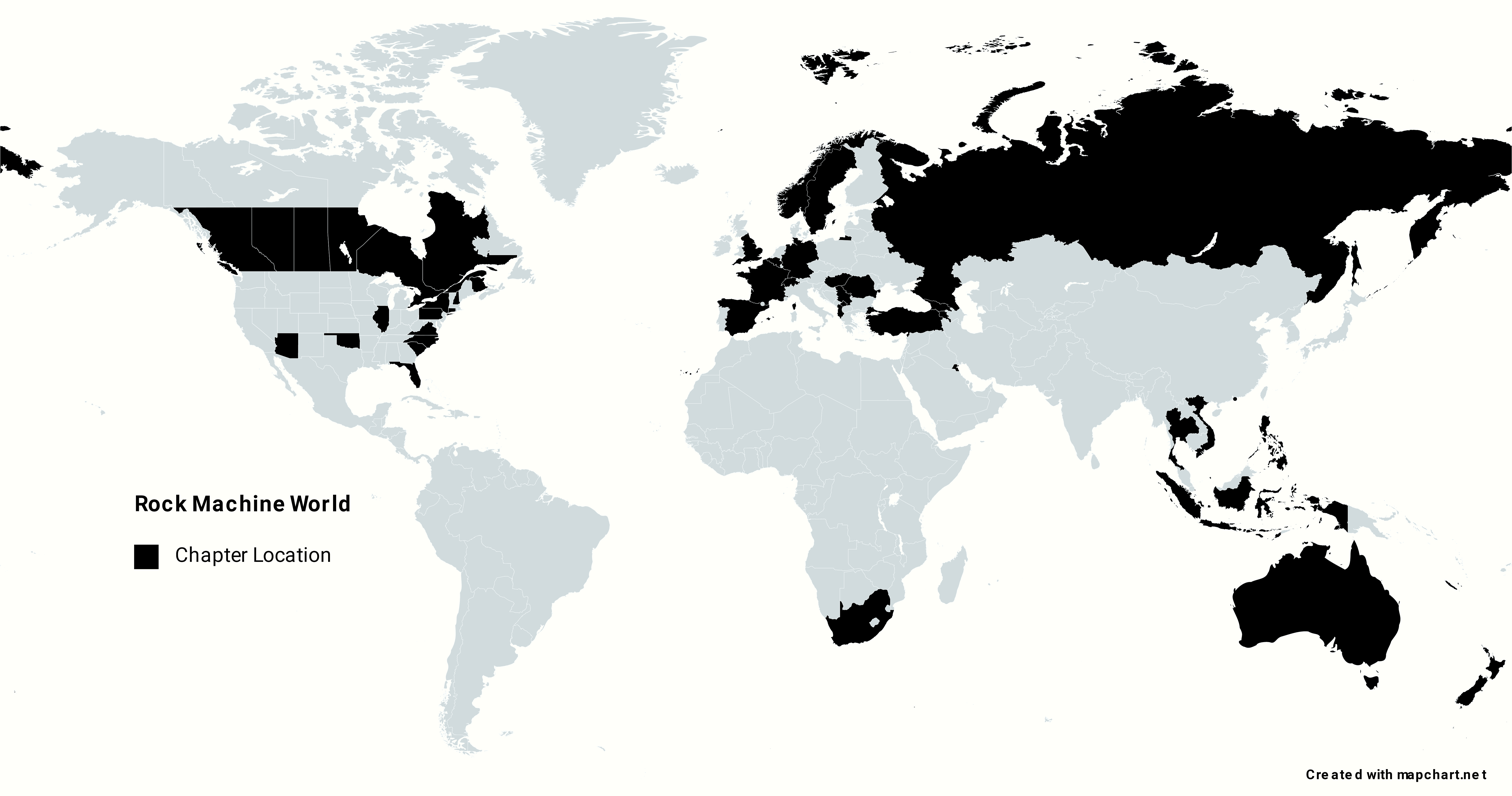
Rock Machine World map

The club has more than 90 active chapters worldwide.

== Criminal allegations and incidents ==
Since its rebirth, the Rock Machine maintains that it is a group of motorcycle enthusiasts and claim that it now dismisses members who are involved in known crimes or criminal activity. Any members that do commit crimes, do so without the club's permission. Many law enforcement agencies and journalists criticize these claims.

== In popular culture ==
=== Television ===
==== Quebec Biker War (Canadian TV series) ====
A television show titled Quebec Biker War is in development as of May 2025. The scripted drama will depict events related to the Quebec Biker War, a violent conflict between rival outlaw motorcycle clubs in Canada during the 1990s and early 2000s. The TV series is based on Edward Winterhalder’s two-volume autobiography Searching For My Identity and his non-fiction book The Assimilation, co-authored with Canadian motosport journalist Wil De Clercq. Quebec Biker War is being developed with Bruce M. Smith serving as showrunner, Nick Copus attached as director, and John Gillespie, Mark Holdom, and Edward Winterhalder credited as executive producers.

==== L’Appel (Canadian TV series) ====
A limited television mini-series starring Vincent Graton as Maurice Boucher, Pier-Luc Funk as Stéphane Gagné, Magalie Lépine Blondeau, and Patrice Robitaille debuted in January 2025. Directed by Julie Perreault and written by Luc Dionne, the series depicts events that led to the arrest and conviction of Boucher during the Quebec Biker War.

== See also ==
- List of outlaw motorcycle clubs
- List of gangs in Canada
