= Claude Vézina =

Canadian outlaw biker and gangster

- Born: 15 June 1956 (age 70); Quebec, Canada
- Other name: "Ti-Loup" (Small Wolf)
- Occupations: Outlaw biker, gangster
- Known for: National president of the Rock Machine; Founder and president of the Quebec City chapter
- Predecessor: Salvatore Cazzetta; Giovanni Cazzetta
- Successor: Marcel Demers (Quebec City); Frédéric Faucher (National)
- Allegiance: Pacific Rebels MC (19??-1988); Rock Machine MC (1988–2001)
- Conviction: Drug trafficking (1997)
- Penalty: 7 years' imprisonment (1997)

Claude Vézina (born 15 June 1956) is a Canadian outlaw biker and gangster who served as president of the Rock Machine Motorcycle Club's Quebec City chapter, before being promoted to national president of the club after the imprisonment of Salvatore Cazzetta. He himself was also convicted of narcotics trafficking.

== Criminal career ==
Nicknamed Ti-Loup (literally translated from French as "Little Wolf"), Vézina was a member of the Pacific Rebels Motorcycle Club, and had already compiled a collection of convictions and arrests dating back to 1979. Before he joined the Rock Machine, which had been established in 1986 to oppose the Hells Angels' monopolistic attitude towards the province of Quebec. He founded a chapter for the Rock Machine in Quebec City in the 1988s, when the Pacific Rebels MC patched over the Rock Machine. He would remain as the Quebec City chapters acting president until 1994. Vézina was also a partial owner of the Rock Machine's clubhouse in Quebec which operated as a bar. That year, on May 6, 1994, founder and national president of the Rock Machine Motorcycle Club, Salvatore "La Barbe" Cazzetta was arrested on a pitbull farm located in Fort Erie, Ontario. He had initially used the property to store drugs. He had been "on the run" for over a year, police found two attack dogs on the property. He was charged with attempting to import eleven tons (11,000kgs) of cocaine. (Valued at an estimated $418,000,000, adjusting for inflation the modern value is $860,563,846.) Salvatore would be imprisoned in Quebec until 1998, when he was extradited to Florida to serve the remainder of his sentence. In June 1999, Cazzetta pled and guilty to narcotics charges, and was sentenced to 12 and a half years in prison. The then Rock Machine national vice-president and Salvatore's "right hand man", Nelson Fernandez was arrested in Montreal. Vézina succeeded Cazzetta as national president, and would lead the club through the initial period of the conflict with the Hells Angels. Gillies Lambert replaced Fernandez as national vice-president. Renaud Jomphe was made president of the Montreal chapter, while Marcel Demers would replace Vézina as president of the Quebec City chapter.

== Arrest and trial ==
On 11 September 1997, as a part of Carcajou, Rock Machine national president Vézina and his sergeant-at-arms Dany "Le Gros" Légaré were both charged with the trafficking of narcotics. In order to conduct his arrest, police had to sneak by guard dogs that he had located on his property; they entered his home and arrested him in his bedroom. This was all the result of a sting operation set up by the Quebec police. A police informant had completed seven transactions of narcotics with the two members of Rock Machine, during a five-month period. The massive raid launched by authorities as part of Operation Carcajou resulted in the seizure of a laboratory where narcotics such as PCP and methamphetamine were produced. $1,500,000 worth of various other narcotics, over 325 kg (716.5 lbs) of dynamite along with detonators, seven pistols, two fully automatic machine guns, three semi-automatic carbines and a pistol suppressor. After the arrest of Vézina, Frédéric Faucher became the Rock Machine's new national president on 11 September 1997, and Alain Burnette was promoted to president of the Quebec City chapter. Both Vézina and Légaré pled guilty in September 1997, and were sentenced to seven and five years' imprisonment respectively, to be served in the Donnacona maximum security detention center. On 14 October 1998, unknown assailants set fire to a business that was owned by Vézina; the fires caused several thousand dollars in damage.

Vézina and Légaré returned to court on 28 September 1999; both men pleaded guilty to thirteen charges, including living off the proceeds of crime. According to the prosecutor Brigitte Bishop, Vézina made over $400,000 per year, while only declaring an income of between $30,000 and $35,000. Vézina received four years, to be served alongside his narcotics trafficking conviction. He also received a $30,000 fine. Légaré would receive three years and a $20,000 fine. Among the items seized by the authorities in connection with this case was the Rock Machine's clubhouse belonging to the Point-Aux-Trembles chapter, four motorcycles, three automobiles, jewellery, a chalet, and a sugar shack in Sainte-Brigitte-de-Laval.

Vézina quit the Rock Machine in February 2001. He contacted and told his club that he was quitting due to their decision to merge with the Texas-based Bandidos Motorcycle Club.
