= Lennoxville massacre =

1985 mass murder of the Laval chapter at a clubhouse in Lennoxville

Coordinates: 45.38249°N 71.87689°W

Lennoxville Massacre
- Part of prelude to the Quebec Biker war
- Location: Lennoxville, Sherbrooke, Quebec, Canada
- Date: March 24, 1985
- Target: Hells Angels (North Chapter)
- Attack type: Gang massacre
- Weapons: Handguns, Shotguns
- Deaths: 5
- Perpetrator: Hells Angels (South Chapter)
- Charges: 21
- Convicted: 4 of first-degree murder

The Lennoxville massacre, or Lennoxville purge, was a mass murder which took place at the Hells Angels clubhouse in Sherbrooke, Quebec, Canada, on March 24, 1985. Five members of the Hells Angels North Chapter were shot dead. The North Chapter was led by 2 of its original and most influential members, Laurent "L'Anglais" Viau (Chapter President) and Yves "Apache" Trudeau. The Lennoxville massacre divided rival outlaw motorcycle gangs in Quebec, leading to the formation of the Rock Machine club in 1986, a rival to the Angels in the 1990s. The name "Lennoxville massacre" is a misnomer since the killings took place in Sherbrooke. The misconception that the killings took place in Lennoxville arose from the fact the victims had stayed and partied at a motel in Lennoxville before they went to the Sherbrooke clubhouse.

== Background ==
Beginning in the 1960s, one of Montreal's more prominent biker gangs were the Popeyes Motorcycle Club, who were led by Yves "Le Boss" Buteau. In the 1970s, the Popeyes had successfully fought against the Devils Diciples and Satan's Choice biker gangs, and as the journalist Patrick Lejtenyi noted: "The violence that ensued cemented Quebec's reputation as one of the most dangerous places for organized crime to do business in North America." Journalist James Dubro told Lejtenyi: "There's always has been more violence in Quebec. In the biker world it's known as the Red Zone. I remember an Outlaws hit man telling me he was scared of going to Montreal." The Hells Angels, who had been looking to expand into Canada, decided that the Popeyes were the best gang to take into their organization. On December 5, 1977, the Popeyes "patched over" to become the first Hells Angel chapter in Canada.

In September 1979, as the Hells Angels continued to grow, the Montreal chapter was divided into two: Montreal North and Montreal South with Yves "Le Boss" Buteau as the national president. Confusingly, the North chapter was based in Laval (north of Montreal) while the South chapter was based in Sorel (northeast of Montreal). The North chapter, led by Laurent "L'Anglais" Viau, consisted mostly of former Popeyes members and still retained Popeye attitudes, in marked contrast to the South chapter headed by Réjean "Zig Zag" Lessard, which was more disciplined. Lessard had joined the Angels in 1979, and did not have the Popeye mentality.

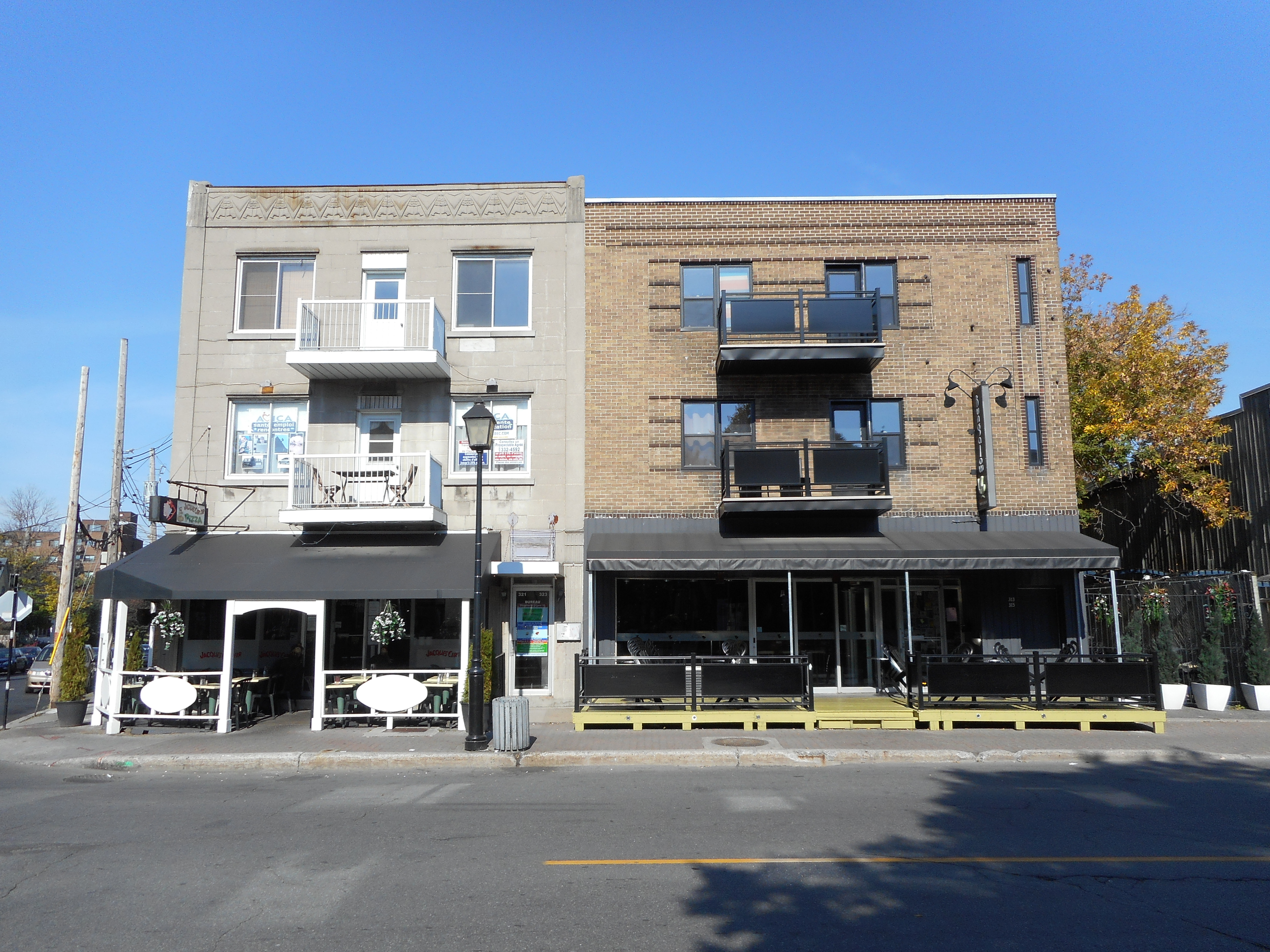
Longueuil restaurant

On September 8, 1983, Buteau and another Angel, René Lamoureaux, were having lunch at a Longueuil restaurant, Le Petit Bourg, with Guy "Frenchie" Gilbert, the president of the Kitchener, Ontario, chapter of the Satan's Choice biker gang, who was considering "patching over" to join the Angels. As the three bikers were leaving the restaurant, a member of the Outlaws, Gino Goudreau, opened fire, killing Buteau and Gilbert while wounding Lamoureaux. Goudreau was a prospect with the Outlaws and believed he would be rewarded with "full patch" status if he could assassinate the leader of the Canadian Hells Angels.

After Buteau's assassination, Michel "Sky" Langlois became the president of the Angels while Lessard continued to lead the South chapter. In a division of labour, Langlois focused his efforts into expanding into the rest of Canada while Lessard had effective operational control of the Angels in Quebec. Laurent "L'Anglais" Viau had a more tolerant attitude towards violence and drug use than his predecessor. The North chapter, which had often chafed at and had broken Buteau's rules about not using drugs, quickly spun out of control under Viau's leadership as Viau himself abused cocaine and alcohol.

== Event ==
Other Hells Angels soon regarded the North chapter as too wild and uncontrollable, often using drugs they were supposed to sell and allegedly skimming drug profits – at least C$60,000 – that were meant for other chapters. The North chapter's gratuitous aggression also frequently led them to being arrested for minor offenses, which put the entire Hells Angels operation in Quebec at risk. André Cédilot, the crime reporter with La Presse newspaper, told Pierre Obendrauf of the Montreal Gazette: "At that moment [in 1985], the Hells Angels were doing a cleanup to become a real criminal organization. Before that, they were disorganized and unruly. They were like a street gang ... The [Laval] guys weren't following the steps the others were taking. They fit the traditional image of bikers ... It was going against the new philosophy of the Hells Angels. The other Hells Angels wanted to be businessmen." Other organized crime groups that the Hells Angels did business with, such as the Rizzuto crime family and the West End Gang, had been pressuring the Angels to bring the North chapter under control. The Hells Angels assassin Yves "Apache" Trudeau later testified for the Crown that relations between the North and South chapters were "ice cold" by the beginning of 1985.

When the leader of the Hells Angels' Halifax chapter, David "Wolf" Carroll, paid Trudeau C$98,000 for killing someone, he learned that the North chapter was actually entitled to one-quarter of the money, and that Trudeau had instead used the money to support his cocaine addiction. As the Halifax chapter was poorer than the North chapter, Trudeau's behavior was considered to be especially crass. Carroll went to Montreal to meet with Lessard, and demanded that he take action against the North chapter. Lessard needed little encouragement from Carroll and spent most of the meeting railing against the North chapter, which he called a menace to the existence of the Angels in Quebec. Also attending the meeting was Georges "Bo-Boy" Beaulieu, the president of the Angels' Sherbrooke chapter, who agreed with Lessard and Carroll that the North chapter needed to be liquidated.

In March 1985, at a secret meeting in Sorel, the Montreal North chapter were declared to be in "bad standing" with the Hells Angels and were hence to be killed. Although it had not been uncommon for Hells Angels to kill one another, this was the first occasion in which an entire chapter had been marked for death. The plan devised by Lessard, Carroll and Beaulieu called for two members of the North chapter to be forced into retirement, another two members to be given a chance to join the South chapter and the rest to all be killed. Lessard and Carroll in particular wanted Viau and Trudeau dead. Robert "Ti-Maigre" Richard, the sergeant-at-arms of the South chapter, announced that a party would be held at the Sherbrooke chapter clubhouse on Saturday, March 23, to be attended by the Sorel, Laval, Halifax and Sherbrooke chapters, which were all of the Angels' chapters in eastern Canada at the time. Four other Angels chapters, all in British Columbia, did not attend the party.

Lessard had planned to ambush the North chapter as they entered the clubhouse, but the plan failed when most of the targets failed to show up. Lessard now extended the party for a second day, and announced that participation at the party was mandatory. Most of the North chapter now appeared with the notable exceptions of Trudeau, who was undergoing drug rehabilitation in Oka, and Michel "Jinx" Genest, who was in the hospital recovering from a failed assassination attempt by the Outlaws. Viau and four of North chapter members – Jean-Guy "Brutus" Geoffrion, Jean-Pierre "Matt le Crosseur" Mathieu, Michel "Willie" Mayrand, and Guy-Louis "Chop" Adam – attended. The five men were ambushed when they arrived. Lessard, with 41 men under his command, forced them into the center of a room in the clubhouse, where they were shot dead.

== Aftermath ==
=== Hells Angels ===
Three members of the North chapter in attendance at the party who were not attacked - Gilles "Le Nez" Lachance, Richard "Bert" Mayrand, and Yvon "Le Père" Bilodeau - were ordered to remove the bodies and wash away the blood. Lessard then told Mayrand and Bilodeau that he was fond of them, and so he was giving them the option to retire from organized crime permanently or else be killed, while Lachance was offered membership in the South chapter, which he accepted.

Together with Jacques "La Pelle" Pelletier and Robert "Snake" Tremblay of the South chapter, Lachance went to see Genest to inform him that he could either join the South chapter or be killed; he chose the former. To confirm his loyalty to the new order, Genest killed Claude "Coco" Roy, a prospect with the North chapter who was considered to be close to the murdered men, and handed over to the South chapter five bags of cocaine that Roy had with him. Over the next few days, the Laval clubhouse was looted of all the money and drugs stored in it, together with six Harley-Davidson motorcycles. Despite the original plan to kill Trudeau at the Sherbrooke clubhouse, he was instead contacted in rehab to be told he had been expelled from the Angels, but that he could rejoin if he killed three people whom Lessard wanted dead. One of these people was Ginette "La Jument" Henri, the accountant to the North chapter and Mathieu's girlfriend.

==== Quebec biker war ====
The massacre was considered extreme even for the criminal underworld, and it gave the Hells Angels a notorious reputation in Quebec. Salvatore Cazzetta found the event an unforgivable breach of the outlaw code and, rather than joining the Angels, he and his brother Giovanni formed their own smaller gang, the Rock Machine, in 1986.

Maurice Boucher, future Quebec Nomad chapter president, did not share Cazzetta's concerns, and after finishing a 40-month sentence for armed sexual assault on a 16-year-old girl, he joined the Hells Angels in 1986 and began to rise through the ranks. The Angels and the Rock Machine co-existed peacefully for several years, which police believed was due to Boucher's respect for the Cazzetta brothers, who were well connected to the Rizzuto crime family, and were the only criminal group the bikers were unwilling to attack. In 1994, Salvatore Cazzetta was arrested at a pit-bull farm for attempting to import eleven tons of cocaine. Boucher began to increase pressure on the Rock Machine shortly after the arrest, initiating the Quebec Biker War.

=== Police investigation ===
In the immediate aftermath of the massacre, police noted changes at the North chapter compound. Pierre de Champlain, a former RCMP officer and a specialist on biker crime, told journalist Patrick Lejtenyi: "They [the police] noticed that the Laval chapter's garage that served as their bunker was closed. The girlfriends of the guys who'd disappeared were approached and asked, 'Have you seen your boyfriend lately?' and things like that. Then they realized that these people had disappeared, but they didn't know they were dead." In June 1985, a fisherman on the St. Lawrence River caught part of the decomposing body of Geoffrion and alerted the police. At the bottom of the river, police divers located the decomposing bodies of all five victims, wrapped in sleeping bags and tied to weightlifting plates. Also found was the skeleton of Berthe Desjardins, who had been missing since February 1980; Desjardins was the wife of a Hells Angel liquidated by Trudeau as a possible police informer, and was herself killed to ensure her silence.

=== Crown witnesses ===
External image
- There was much controversy when co-founder of the Hells Angels North Chapter Yves "Apache" Trudeau received a lenient sentence of 7 years for the murder of 43 people.

Gilles Lachance, who was profoundly troubled by the massacre, contacted the Sûreté du Québec to state his willingness to work as an informer and to wear a wire. Gerry "Le Chat" Coulombe, a prospect with the South chapter, was also troubled by the massacre and also agreed to turn informer for the Sûreté du Québec. In exchange for his life, Trudeau was offered a deal by the South chapter to kill three other people associated with the North chapter. Trudeau carried out one killing, but was arrested for possession of illegal weapons in July 1985. Realizing that he would likely be killed while in prison, Trudeau cut a plea deal with the Crown, where for testifying against the Hells Angels leadership in Quebec, the Crown would treat the 43 murders he committed between 1970 and 1985 as manslaughter, for which he would serve just seven years. As result of Trudeau's testimony, 90 murders were solved and nineteen Hells Angels members were convicted. Given that Trudeau had committed 43 murders, first as a Popeye and then as a Hells Angel, his lenient sentence attracted much controversy.

=== Convictions, sentencing and parole ===
Several members of the Hells Angels were present and played a role in the slaughter, but only four – Jacques Pelletier, Luc "Sam" Michaud, Réjean "Zig-Zag" Lessard and later Robert "Snake" Tremblay – were convicted of first-degree murder. The others were convicted of lesser related crimes.

One of the Angels present at the massacre, Richard "Bert" Mayrand, who was the older brother of victim Michel "Willie" Mayrand, refused the Crown's offer to testify against his brother's killers, saying the Angels were his family and he would never betray his "brothers" who had killed his biological brother. Mayrand later returned to the Angels and served as one of Boucher's lieutenants during the Quebec Biker War. David "Wolf" Carroll, the leader of the Halifax chapter of the Angels who at the very least was present at the massacre, was charged with first-degree murder but was acquitted in 1987. Carroll moved to Montreal in 1990 and later played a very prominent role in the Quebec Biker War. He fled Canada in March 2001 to escape an arrest warrant and has disappeared.

Pelletier, Michaud, Lessard and Tremblay were given life sentences for the murders with no chance of parole before 25 years. They were all granted parole nonetheless on the faint hope clause and ended up serving between 17 and 22 years each. Robert "Ti-Maigre" Richard, who issued the invitations to the massacre, was acquitted of all charges and died of a heart attack at his home in 1996. Michaud was released on full parole in June 2005. Pelletier were granted day parole in October 2008. Of the men convicted of the massacre:

- Robert "Snake" Tremblay was granted full parole on August 30, 2004, and is living in Montreal. Tremblay told the parole board: "I sincerely deplore having taken the life of another person. I am very aware that I have to watch out for who I associate with and that I have everything to lose if I return to the criminal world."
- Luc "Sam" Michaud was granted full parole on May 6, 2005. Though he denied killing anyone, he stated his regret for his involvement in a crime that put him in prison for 20 years. Michaud, described as a zealous Hells Angel at the time of his conviction, returned to Roman Catholicism while in prison and was expelled from the Angels in 1993.
- Réjean "Zig Zag" Lessard, the leader of the plot behind the massacre, converted to Buddhism while in prison and left the Angels in 1989. Lessard was granted day parole on February 3, 2006, and told the National Parole Board that he had become a vegetarian, a pacifist, and a Buddhist, saying: "You can't be a Buddhist and be in that milieu." Lessard was granted full parole on August 11, 2010, and is living in Montreal.
- Jacques Pelletier was granted full parole on May 6, 2013. He was sent back to prison in 2014 after he violated the terms of his parole by associating with Hells Angels.

== See also ==
- List of massacres in Canada
