= Salvatore Cazzetta =

Canadian outlaw biker and gangster

- Born: 1954 (age 71–72); Montreal, Quebec, Canada
- Other name: "La Barbe"
- Occupations: Outlaw biker; crime boss
- Years active: 1976–2022
- Known for: National president of the Rock Machine
- Successor: Claude Vézina
- Allegiance: SS MC (1976–1986); Rock Machine MC (1986–2000); Hells Angels MC (2005–2022)

Salvatore "Sal" Cazzetta (born c. 1954), also known as "La Barbe" ("the Beard"), is a Canadian former outlaw biker and gangster who founded the Rock Machine Motorcycle Club and later joined the Hells Angels following the Quebec Biker War. He was also a longtime associate of the Rizzuto crime family of Montreal.

== Outlaw biker ==
Cazzetta was born in Montreal and grew up in the Saint-Henri neighborhood in the south of the city, a crime-ridden area which was a territory of the Dubois brothers gang. Cazzetta became involved in low-level crime as a young man, and his first arrest was in 1975 when he stole a Ford Mustang and scrapped it for parts. In 1976, he became a founding member and leader of the SS Motorcycle Club. In 1977, Salvatore and his brother Giovanni were charged with robbery and breaking and entering. They had broken into a local bar and attempted to steal money from the cigarette machines, finding only $300. Police arrived, and while hiding in the basement, Cazzetta attempted to attack an officer. For this, he received a two-year prison sentence. By 1980, he was released and his love for the biker lifestyle increased. Shortly after his release, Cazzetta was caught attempting to steal a Harley-Davidson motorcycle. He got a tattoo on his left arm that depicted a Harley Davidson motorcycle with the word "Brothers" inscribed.

By 1981, Cazzetta was returned to prison for minor offences and he had been involved in a series of break-ins and robberies of local businesses, including the theft of 26 leather jackets from a clothing store (presumably to be turned into biker vests). While incarcerated at the Bordeaux Detention Center, he participated in the murder of fellow inmate Wayne Story. Five men, including Cazzetta, stormed into Story's cell and beat him to death with metal rods. The police believe that this was a gang-related incident. The evidence against Cazzetta and the other convicts was so weak, however, that the case was dismissed. By 1982, Cazzetta was released from prison and began to sell narcotics. Shortly afterwards, he served a two-month term for possession of 56 grams of PCP.

=== Rock Machine ===
By 1984, the SS biker club's membership had increased and its ranks included several high-profile figures in the Canadian biker scene, including the Cazzetta brothers, Paul "Sasquatch" Porter, Maurice "Mom" Boucher, Normand "Biff" Hamel, Gillies Lambert, Louis "Mélou" Roy, Normand Robitaille, Salvatore Brunetti, René "Balloune" Charlebois, André Chouinard, Denis "Pas Fiable" Houle, Gilles "Trooper" Mathieu, Michel Rose, Richard "Dick" Mayrand, and Frédéric "Fred" Faucher. Boucher, who joined the SS in 1982, became friends with Cazzetta, and as leaders of the club, the pair became candidates to join the Hells Angels when that club expanded into Canada. The SS was disbanded in 1984, and the Cazzetta brothers and Porter, along with others, chose not to join the Hells Angels. Instead, they founded the Rock Machine in 1986. When Boucher was released from prison the same year, he was offered membership in the Rock Machine by the Cazzetta brothers, but he declined the offer in favor of joining the Hells Angels.

Elements of the Hells Angels' Montreal chapter had become convinced that five senior members of their club had been embezzling club profits, and so they lured them to a meeting and killed them in an event known as the Lennoxville massacre of 1985. According to true crime author RJ Parker, this mass killing triggered distrust within other elements of Canada's underworld. According to Parker, the Cazzetta brothers were closely related to senior member of the Rizzuto crime family, and thus adopted the position that underworld members should not kill other members of their own gang. The Rock Machine, which had been founded in response to the Lennoxville purge, established its "mother chapter" in the city of Montreal. The Cazzetta brothers recruited heavily, and by the early 1990s, the Rock Machine had over 100 members or "prospect" members between its Montreal and Quebec City chapters. The brothers also formed alliances with the Rizzuto family, the West End Gang, and the Dubois gang. Throughout the late 1980s and early 1990s, the club began to use their contacts in the West End Gang to purchase large and import amounts of narcotics though the Port of Montreal. Cazzetta has often been described as controlling all of the organized crime in Montreal that was not controlled by the Mafia in the late 1980s and early 1990s. Times were profitable for the Rock Machine, enough so that Cazzetta purchased a mansion worth $2 million in L'Épiphanie.

In January 1993, West End Gang associates William "Billy" McAllister and Paul Larue were in talks with Cazzetta to put together another large deal for the two groups and had been speaking with a contact named John Burns in Florida, who had agreed to supply a large amount of cocaine. The pair did not have enough money so they were reliant on the Rock Machine and other aligned motorcycle clubs to provide most of the $875,000 (modern equivalent of $1,847,546) in U.S. currency needed for the initial purchase. On 10 March 1993, the exchange was officially set. On 19 March 1993, Cazzetta and fellow high-ranking Rock Machine member Nelson Fernandez traveled to Florida. With them, they brought the Rock Machine's contribution to the deal, which amounted to $660,000 (modern equivalent of $1,393,577). The two exchanged the money with Burns at a hotel. The plan was for them to take the initial portion of the shipment to two others who would be in charge of smuggling the drugs across the Canadian border. The amount that they were paying for the cocaine seemed too good to be true and it was. On 21 March 1993, McAllister and Larue, along with several others, were placed under arrest by Quebec police in relation to the importation of narcotics. Burns turned out to be an undercover Drug Enforcement Administration (DEA) agent who had purposely lured McAllister into the sting. Cazzetta and Fernandez returned to Canada before being arrested.

Both the Rock Machine and the Hell Angels remained on peaceful terms for years, a situation to which there were multiple factors; Cazzetta and Boucher were "longtime friends" and possessed a great amount of respect for one another. The Cazzetta brothers also had business dealing and ties with Italian-Canadian Mafia groups in Quebec, particularly the Sicilian Rizzuto family. As the Rizzuto family imported large amounts of narcotics through the port of Montreal, the Rock Machine acted as one of the Mafia's distributors by supplying their product to street-level operations to be sold. Cazzetta was particularly involved with the Mafia, being friends with several high profile Mafiosi. These operations gained the club considerable notoriety and influence in Quebec's criminal underground.

According to Parker, another possible theory the Hells Angels would not instigate any issues against the Rock Machine were out of concern the powerful Rizzuto Family would directly intervene on their behalf. It was said that the Cazzetta brothers were related to a member of the Rizzuto family. He wrote that while Boucher worked to rebuild his chapters ties with fellow Hells Angels chapters and other criminal groups. Salvatore Cazzetta had too forged alliances to mafia's and motorcycle clubs. He had also forged ties with cartels in South America, and had become one of Montreal's principal importers of cocaine and heroin.

Cazzetta's cocaine smuggling and distribution resulted in significant police scrutiny. On 6 May 1994, Cazzetta was arrested at a pitbull farm located in Fort Erie, Ontario, a location he had initially used to store drugs. He had been "on the run" for over a year. Cazzetta was charged with attempting to import eleven tons (11,000kgs) of cocaine. Cazzetta was imprisoned in Quebec until 1998, when he was extradited to Florida to serve the remainder of his sentence. In June 1999, he pled guilty to narcotics charges, and was sentenced to 12 and a half years in prison. The then Rock Machine national vice president and "right hand man" of Cazzetta, Fernandez was arrested in Montreal and was able to serve his time in Canada because he won his extradition case.

With Cazzetta imprisoned, the Hells Angels began attempting to gain a monopoly over the street-level drug trade in Montreal, bringing them into direct conflict with the Rock Machine. The Quebec Biker War lasted eight years. In August 1996, Cazzetta, who was being held in the Parthenais Detention Center prior to his extradition to the United States, was attacked and wounded by six other prisoners in a "jailhouse contract". Cazzetta claimed that as he was in prison, he had no involvement in the biker war, and blamed the conflict on the Hells Angels and other members of the Rock Machine. Authorities in Canada heavily disputed this, stating that Cazzetta had been giving orders to the members of the Rock Machine via telephone and message while incarcerated at Archambault Prison in Quebec. He remained incarcerated for almost the entire conflict. Cazzetta disapproved of the Rock Machine's December 2000 "patch over" to the Bandidos, and so he instead aligned himself with the Hells Angels. By the time Cazzetta had served his sentence, Boucher was serving a life sentence, the biker war was over, and the Rock Machine had been absorbed into the Bandidos.

=== Hells Angels ===
Cazzetta was released from prison after being granted parole in June 2004, having served two thirds of his sentence. He expressed joy when he heard that he would not have to spend the remainder of his sentence at a halfway house, and declared his intentions to move to Ontario where he was less known. Cazzetta join the Montreal chapter of the Hells Angels in 2005. He would rise to lead the Hells Angels in Quebec.

On 3 June 2009, 600 police officers arrested 46 persons in the Montreal area and on the Kahnawake Mohawk reserve. Included in the crackdown were Cazzetta and his "right-hand man", Daniel "Putin" Leclerc. The charges against them included trafficking in contraband cigarettes and other drugs such as crack cocaine, as well as committing crimes for the benefit of a criminal organization.

Cazzetta was leader of the Hells Angels in Quebec between 2011 and 2016.

On 22 November 2022, Éric Thibault and Félix Séguin of Le Journal de Montréal reported that Cazzetta had been forced into retirement in "good standing" from the Hells Angels after falling out of favour with other senior members of the club.
