= Giovanni Cazzetta =

Canadian outlaw biker and gangster

- Born: 1957 (age 68–69); Montreal, Quebec, Canada
- Other name: "Johnny"
- Occupations: Outlaw biker; crime boss
- Known for: National president of the Rock Machine
- Predecessor: Salvatore Cazzetta
- Successor: Claude Vézina
- Allegiance: SS MC (1984–1986); Rock Machine MC (1986–2000)
- Convictions: Drug trafficking (1993); Drug trafficking (1998); Money laundering (1999)
- Penalty: 4 years' imprisonment (1993); 9 years' imprisonment (1998); 5 years' imprisonment to be served concurrently with his 9 year sentence (1999)

Giovanni "Johnny" Cazzetta (born 1957) is a Canadian outlaw biker and gangster who, along with his brother Salvatore Cazzetta, was a co-founder of the Rock Machine Motorcycle Club in Montreal. He was the club's second in command, and also had considerable connections with Quebec's Mafia figures.

== Outlaw biker ==
Cazzetta was born in Montreal, Quebec, in 1957. He and his brother Salvatore grew up in the city's Saint-Henri neighborhood, which was known as a territory of the Dubois brothers. Giovanni acknowledged during his trial that he had spent his younger years "basically raising himself", and that he had made a conscious decision to take up a life of organized crime for monetary gain. In 1977, he and Salvatore were charged with robbery and breaking and entering. They had broken into a local bar and attempted to steal money from the cigarette machines, although they found only $300. The police arrived and while hiding in the bar's basement, Salvatore attempted to attack an officer. For this he received a two year sentence. At some point in the 1970s, he joined the SS Motorcycle Club with his brother. Salvatore and Maurice "Mom" Boucher were leaders of the SS, which had been labeled an anti-immigration group and which was under consideration for an invitation to join the Hells Angels.

=== Rock Machine ===
When the SS was disbanded in 1984, Giovanni and Salvatore Cazzetta, Paul "Sasquatch" Porter and others chose not to join the Hells Angels. Following the Hells Angels' internal Lennoxville massacre of 1985, which occurred when five senior members were ambushed and killed due to elements within the club's Montreal chapter suspecting they were embezzling club profits, the Cazzetta brothers and Boucher went their separate ways. According to true crime author RJ Parker, the massacre was met with distrust within other elements of Quebec's underworld. According to Parker, the Cazzetta brothers were closely related to a senior member of the Rizzuto crime family, and thus adopted the position that underworld members should not kill other members of their own club. Boucher joined the Hells Angels.

In 1986, the Cazzetta brothers and other former members of the SS formed the Rock Machine motorcycle gang. That same year Boucher, was released from prison. The Cazzetta brothers offered Boucher membership in the Rock Machine, but he declined the offer. The Rock Machine established its first chapter in the city of Montreal and began taking over turf formerly controlled by the Montreal chapter of the Hells Angels, which had been weakened by the Lennoxville massacre. Cazzetta held the position of second-in-command, with only his brother Salvatore holding more influence. The Cazzetta brothers recruited some of the best talent available, and by the early 1990s, the Rock Machine had over 100 members or prospective members between its Montreal and Quebec City chapters. The Rock Machine also formed alliances with the Rizzuto family, the West End Gang, and the Dubois Gang. The Rock Machine flourished under the leadership of the Cazzetta brothers, and throughout the late 1980s and early 1990s, the club began to use their contacts in the West End Gang to purchase large and import amounts of narcotics through the Port of Montreal.

Both the Rock Machine and the Hell Angels remained on peaceful terms for years. There were multiple factors to this; Salvatore Cazzetta and Boucher were "longtime friends" and possessed a great amount of respect for one another. The Cazzetta brothers also had business dealings and ties with Italian-Canadian Mafia groups in Quebec, particularly the Sicilian Rizzuto family. As the Mafia imported large amounts of narcotics through the port of Montreal, the Rock Machine acted as one of their distributors, supplying drugs to street-level operations to be sold. Cazzetta was particularly involved with the Mafia, being friends with several high profile Mafia members. These operations gained the club considerable notoriety and influence in Quebec's criminal underground. According to Parker, the Hells Angels would not instigate any issues against the Rock Machine out of concern that the powerful Rizzuto family would directly intervene on the Rock Machine's behalf. It was said that the Cazzetta brothers were related to a member of the Rizzuto family.

=== Quebec Biker War ===
In April 1992, Cazzetta was arrested by police and charged with trafficking narcotics. Police had found him to be in position of three kilograms of cocaine (valued at $2.25 million, modern equivalent of $4,893,052). In the spring of 1993, he pleaded guilty to four charges and was sentenced to four years in prison. The Rock Machine's cocaine smuggling and distribution resulted in increased police scrutiny, and 1994, Salvatore Cazzetta was arrested with eleven tons of cocaine. The Cazzetta brothers' detention triggered Boucher to attack the Rock Machine to instigate the Quebec Biker War. The conflict lasted eight years, and many innocent bystanders were hurt or killed. While Salvatore Cazzetta was in prison during the entirety of the war, Giovanni Cazzetta would be temporarily released.

Cazzetta was released from prison in early 1997 and continued as a senior member of the Rock Machine. Claude Vézina, who became national president of the Rock Machine following the imprisonment of Salvatore Cazzetta, subsequently stepped down from the position and was succeeded by Giovanni Cazzetta, who led the club through the biker war until May 1997.

Cazzetta was one of those arrested in an operation by Quebec police on 20 May 1997. A man from Calgary had attempted to purchase 15 kilos of cocaine from Cazzetta (valued at $585,000, adjusting for inflation the modern equivalent is around 1.1 million in 2022). When Cazzetta contacted Richard Matticks of the West End Gang about obtaining the required amount for the sale, he was told that an amount that large was hard to acquire on such short notice. Matticks was able to supply nine kilos at a value of around $350,000 (over $650,000 after adjusting for inflation). However, the individual from Alberta turned out to be an informant for the Crown. The drug mules who delivered the cocaine to the informant, Frank Bonneville and Donald Waite, were arrested and the narcotics seized by police. Matticks, along with Bonneville and Waite, pled guilty on 17 June 1997. Matticks was sentenced to three years in prison and was fined $50,000. Bonneville and Waite received four and two years, respectively. Cazzetta, who was still on probation from his prior narcotics charges in 1993, was sentenced to nine years in prison time in April 1998. Rock Machine national vice president Gillies Lambert was arrested alongside Cazzetta and received three years for narcotics trafficking. Other defendants in the case, Maria Cazzetta, Giovanni's sister, and Suzanne Poudrier, received one year conditional sentences. In total, the police confiscated more that $4 million in Rock Machine assets from this group of arrests. While incarcerated, Cazzetta, who has never held any legitimate job, was found guilty of money laundering. He received five more years, to be served concurrently with his nine year sentence, and the Canadian government seized more than $600,000 in assets, including Cazzetta's engraved Rock Machine gold ring, a 1994 Jeep Cherokee, a 1959 Corvette, and a 1992 Lexus.

=== Later years ===
In 2004, Cazzetta was moved a maximum-security to a medium-security penitentiary located in Laval, Quebec. In May 2005, he appeared before the parole board and stated that if freed, he planned to move to Calgary and start a construction company. Like his brother Salvatore, Giovanni Cazzetta also denied any involvement in the Quebec Biker War, stating that the conflict wouldn't have occurred if he wasn't in prison, and that the Hells Angels caused the war while he was incarcerated, thus he did not have any involvement. Cazzetta was denied parole. The parole board claimed that though they couldn't link Giovanni to any of the violent incidents that occurred., they mentioned the countless people that had their lives affected by the drug market that Giovanni created. In reality, Cazzetta had been very influential during the conflict while he was not incarcerated in 1997. During that time, he returned to leading the Rock Machine and began to sell large amounts of narcotics for the club. He was well connected in Quebec's underworld and was able to facilitate large transactions of narcotics. Cazzetta argued that the reason he had aided the Rock Machine was due to the fact that he wanted to "help his friends". He also added that returning to the Rock Machine brought security, which he needed. Nonetheless, he Cazzetta affirmed that he was done with his life of crime and he tried to distance himself from his former associates.

By the time his older brother, Salvatore Cazzetta, had served his sentence, Boucher himself was serving a life sentence, the biker war was over, and the Rock Machine had been absorbed into the Bandidos, a merger with which he and his brother strongly disagreed. Salvatore Cazzetta chose to join the Hells Angels in 2005. and he would rise to lead the Hells Angels in Quebec. In May 2007, Giovanni Cazzetta was conditionally released.
