= Rock Machine MC criminal allegations and incidents =

Criminal incidents involving the Rock Machine Motorcycle Club

Rock Machine Motorcycle Club
- Founded: 1986; 40 years ago
- Founder: Salvatore Cazzetta, Giovanni Gazzetta
- Founding location: Montreal, Canada
- Years active: 1986–present
- Territory: Worldwide – Canada, United States, Australia, Germany, Russia, Switzerland, Hungary, Belgium, New Zealand, Sweden, Norway, France, England, Spain, Georgia, Hong Kong, Serbia, South Africa, Kuwait, Armenia, Brazil, Indonesia, Thailand, Kosovo, Vietnam, Philippines, Turkey, Denmark
- Ethnicity: Multicultural
- Membership (est.): 2,000 active members across the globe
- Activities: Racketeering, drug trafficking, arms trafficking, assault, murder, extortion, money laundering, bombings, arson, intimidation, insurance fraud, kidnapping, robbery, theft, counterfeiting, smuggling, loan sharking, prostitution, contract killing
- Allies: Avengers MC; Bandidos (formerly); Black Jackets; Bertrand Clan; Black Pistons; Broncos MC; Dark Circle; Dubois Brothers; Fearless Bandits MC; Ghost Gang MC (Germany); Gremium MC; Hell Hounds MC; Kingsmen MC; Loners MC; Manitoba Warriors; Mongols (formerly); New Bloods MC; Night Wolves MC; Outlaws MC; Palmers MC; Pelletier Clan; Red Power; Rizzuto crime family; Roberge Brothers; Sadistic Souls MC; Satudarah MC; Serbian Mafia; Sons of Silence; SS Elite Motorcycle Club; United Tribuns; Various South American Cartels; Vendettas MC; West End Gang; Wrecking Crew MC
- Rivals: Bandidos MC; Blatnois MC; Comanchero MC; Cotroni crime family (1994–2001); Death Riders MC; Demon Keepers MC; Damners MC; Diablos MC; Evil Ones MC; Finks MC; Hells Angels; Jackels MC; Jokers MC; Mercenaries MC; Mongols MC; Rockers MC; Rowdy Crew MC; No Surrender MC; Rebels MC; Red Devils MC; Redlined MC; Satan's Choice; Satan's Guards; The Scorpions; United Tribuns (formerly)
- Notable members: Salvatore Cazzetta; Giovanni Cazzetta; Johnny Plescio; Paul Porter; Renaud Jomphe; Andrew "Curly" Sauvageau; Gilles Lambert; Claude Vézina; Marcel Demers; Frédéric Faucher; Robert Léger; Jean Duquaire; André Désormeaux; Serge Cyr; Alain Brunette; The Paradis Brothers; Jean Judes Faucher; Tony Plescio; Patrick Hénault; Sean Brown; Joseph Strachan; Brent Reker; Marc Guérin; Critical J; Suat Gerring; Kublai "Uzi" Aguila; Lou "Waggz" Wagner; Aj Leger; Travis "Lead" Goff

Numerous police and international intelligence and enforcement agencies classify the Rock Machine Motorcycle Club as a motorcycle gang and contend that members carry out widespread violent crimes, including drug dealing, trafficking in stolen goods, gunrunning, extortion, and prostitution operations. Members of the organization have continuously asserted that they are only a group of motorcycle enthusiasts who have joined to ride motorcycles together, to organize social events such as group road trips, fundraisers, parties, and motorcycle rallies, and that any crimes are the responsibility of the individuals who carried them out and not the club as a whole. Members of the club have been accused of crimes and/or convicted in many host nations.

== Canada ==
=== Alberta ===
On December 14, 2010, Andrew "Blaklistid" Block, a member of the Rock Machine's Edmonton chapter, was shot and killed. His body was found by Edmonton Police at the corner of 127 St. and 116 Ave, located in the suburb of Inglewood. He had been shot in the head while behind the wheel of his pickup truck. The bullet had entered the back windshield of the vehicle, passed through the headrest and hit the victim. A post was made on WWW.RockMachine.ca by the club that extended their official condolences to his family and honoring his memory. Another post was also made by the Rock Machine Nova Scotia. One member wrote on the site's guest book.

It is with heavy hearts that all of the Nova Scotia Rock Machine Full Patches, prospects, hangarounds, and supporters send our thoughts, prayers and condolences for the loss of Brother Andy Rock. He was taken from us too soon. Ride on and rest in peace, brother.

=== British Columbia ===
In March 2014, it was revealed by police and media in British Columbia, that members of the Rock Machine Nomads Canada chapter, had arrived in B.C. They had been sighted in province's lower mainland. They stated that this wasn't a shock, as they had heard "rumblings since 2005 that Rock Machine members wanted to break into B.C." He also claimed that "potential members wearing Rock Machine support gear have been threatened recently." They went on to state that this brought a moderate amount of concern due to the groups violent history with one another. They had faced each other during the bloody Quebec Biker War (1994–2002) that took the lives of over 160 people, injured over 180, with over 300 attempted assassinations.

The Rock Machine and its support clubs, the Vendettas Motorcycle Club, Hell Hounds MC and SS Elite Motorcycle Club had also clashed with the Hells Angels and their support club the Redline Motorcycle Club for control of Manitoba from 2009 to 2011. The conflict saw a combination of shootings and fire bombings. The officer stated "That is how they look after those sorts of conflicts, and the car bomb was one of the most effective tools they used back in Quebec. So my point is that it is not a stretch to see the Quebec-like response here in B.C., because they have done it before." Police were interviewed by The Province News, they had also interviewed an associate or member of the Rock Machine that stated that the club planned on setting up a full chapter in Vancouver, British Columbia within the next year. The officer commented that this would be difficult as the Hells Angels owned the province and would not take lightly to their presence without their permission. However he did also state that "The war [in Manitoba] has been quiet in the past few months, but the rivalry is still existent and it appears the Rock Machine outlaw motorcycle gang are still intent on expanding their presence here and across Canada," authorities stated in 2012, according to the Winnipeg Sun.

It was assumed the Rock Machine Motorcycle Club had solid plans to challenge the Hells Angels in B.C. It could have been due to a perceived "power vacuum", due to the continued gang conflicts in the province. "It is my view that with all of the gang killings around the region in the recent years and with law enforcement that has been very effective with some massive prosecutions, ... there is a void that is out there to be filled", the police biker club expert told The Province News. He also stated they had a long way to go, as the Hells Angels possessed around 100 Full Patch members in the province at the time, and that it would take them quite a while to set up an operation here with the ability to challenge the Angels. The Rock Machine would establish its Vancouver chapter, this could have been with permission from the Angels, as there has been no conflict in the province as of yet. However members of the Rock Machine British Columbia were arrested at the Chez Pare in 2011, a famous downtown strip club in Montreal. Quebec police had detained them while meeting with Rock Machine members from Ontario, Manitoba and Quebec, showing that they had been active in the province for much longer than sources thought.

=== Nova Scotia ===
During late 2008, the Rock Machine established its Halifax chapter in Nova Scotia. Several outlaw motorcycle clubs are attracted to the province by the ports in Halifax and Sydney. RCMP Constable Stephen MacQueen stated that Rock Machine and other motorcycle club chapters in these cities, can be used as a pipeline to smuggle narcotics into Canada. The Rock Machine temporarily froze their Halifax chapter for an unknown reason in February 2010, according to MacQueen. One month prior, the Bacchus Motorcycle Club had re-entered the province by patching over the East Coast Riders in Hants County. Just weeks following the ceremony, new Bacchus member, James "Rustie" Hall and Ellen Hall, were shot and killed in their residence in Barr Settlement, Hants County. No one was ever arrested for the murders.

Const. MacQueen stated that the East Coast Riders chose to join Bacchus. Seeing it as a preferable option, when compared to other Hells Angels rivals, like the Rock Machine and Outlaws Motorcycle Club, that were looking to expand their influence in the province. By October 2010, the Rock Machine had unfrozen its Halifax chapter and supposedly established a second chapter in Cape Breton. According to Const. MacQueen, "There's indication on the Rock Machine website that they've reopened in Nova Scotia. We haven't seen that yet [physically]." There main rival the Hells Angels official presence in Nova Scotia, was ended by raids on its Halifax chapter in August 2003. However it maintains influence in the province through its support clubs, the Darksiders MC and Highlanders MC. All of this ongoing tension had the RCMP in the province quite fearful of conflict between these groups. The Rock Machine's presence in the province would be confirmed with a statement from the Nova Scotia Rock Machine during the death of a member of the club from Edmonton, Alberta in mid December 2010. It is not known what occurred but at some period during the mid to late 2010s, the Rock Machine froze its chapters in Nova Scotia.

=== Manitoba ===
In 2008, a series of raids carried out by Winnipeg Police and Manitoba RCMP left the Hells Angels in the province all but crippled. The Rock Machine Motorcycle Club was seeking to expand west during this period, The Rock Machine were first sighted in Manitoba during mid 2008. Four members of the Nomads Canada chapter were present at a hotel on Notre Dame Avenue hotel. An RCMP representative claimed the Rock Machine "graciously thanked law enforcement for handing them the province". They quickly gained momentum in Manitoba becoming the dominant club in Winnipeg. This was all possible due police activities in early December 2008. Operation Divide was conducted by Manitoba police, it led to the arrests of 30 members of the Hells Angels and their support club, the Zig Zag Crew. A few Hells Angels were sent to prison along with most of the Zig Zag Crew. This is what would cause the Hells Angels to start relying more on another support club, the Redlined Motorcycle Club, to take over the responsibility of the Zig Zags in Manitoba. Documents from the trial claimed that with the Angels influence currently at a low level in the province, the Rock Machine were beginning to lay territorial claims. They also began openly displaying their colours in public, this caused retaliation from the Manitoba Angels. The Rock Machine in Manitoba was further reinforced by several former members of the now defunct Zig Zag Crew. Most notably Jean Paul Beaumont, the future "Sergeant-at-Arms" for the Rock Machine Winnipeg chapter. And Future National and international president, Joseph "Critical J" Strachan.

In January 2009, the Vendettas Motorcycle Club was established as a support club by the Rock Machine, this was done to give them more manpower in the province. In 2009, what would come to be known as the Rock Machine-Hells Angels Conflict in Manitoba began. It saw clashes start between the Rock Machine supported by the Vendettas Motorcycle Club and the Hells Angels and their support club, the Redlined MC. Several attacks on Rock Machine properties occurred with no casualties or initial retaliation in 2009.

"Tensions are extremely high between these groups and violence is imminent", investigators said. "Members of the Redlined … and Hells Angels supporters have been placed on high alert and have been tasked with actively seeking out and Rock Machine [members] or Rock Machine associates and to "take care" of them by any means necessary."

In mid January 2010, the officially conflict started. A member of the Rock Machine Winnipeg chapter, Corey Cadotte, was hit with a stool multiple times and jumped by several men belonging to the Redlined MC. He had been baited into a meeting at an automotive shop on St. Mary's Road and had gone alone. He had formerly been a member of the Zig Zag Crew, but he had patched over to the Rock Machine following the raids, this infuriated his former allies. He received such bad injuries from the stool that he was nearly "unrecognizable."

The Rock Machine were furious and ordered the Vendettas Crew to retaliate. Not long after the beating an arson occurred, when a flare gun was shot through the window of a home on Mighton Avenue, in Winnipeg Manitoba. The property belonged to a member of the Redlined MC. The police fearing retaliation had received a search warrant to search the building. This was due to information received from an informant the police had within the Redlined MC, identified only as "X" in court documents. He stated "because of the ongoing dispute between the two gangs. He needs to have it [the gun] ready in case of any retaliation by members or associates of the Rock Machine." But the building had already been damaged by the flare when they arrived. They arrested a member of the Redlined and seized a loaded nine millimetre handgun from the burnt out building. The Vendettas are suspected by authorities of being behind the incident. As authorities state the member of the Redlined had been one of those who were present when the Rock Machine member was beaten at the body shop.

On Sunday, February 7, 2010, Winnipeg Police revealed that the Rock Machine and Hells Angels got into a brawl at a bar inside a St. Boniface hotel. They had been monitoring the hotel the night before as they had received information that the Rock Machine was going to arrive at the bar because "They knew associates of the Hells Angels frequented the place." Unfortunately for authorities nothing happened on Saturday. The authorities also reported that they feared an escalation. This was due to the sighting of a number of Rock Machine members from outside the province of Manitoba over the past week.

On June 14, 2011, three assumed members of the Rock Machine or Vendettas were sighted fleeing the scene of a firebombing against a Hells Angels business on Logan Avenue. The arson would cause $20,000 in damages. Later information from a police informant linked some employees as being associated to the Hells Angels.

On June 27, 2010, a member of the Redlined MC had his house located in Elmwood-area shot at. In November 2010. Daniel Kachkan, a former high-ranking member of the Hells Angels, was shot "execution-style" inside his home, no one was connected with the incident at the time, but the Rock Machine was among those suspected by police. Authorities had distributed an internal memo shortly before the murder, warning officers that necessary."

"Members of the Rock Machine motorcycle gang are believed to be armed and may be planning attacks against those affiliated with the Hells Angels."

On June 29, 2011, a shooting was reported near the residence of a Hell Angels on the corner of Kingston Row and Osborne Streets. Later a civilian found a sawed-off rifle with empty bullet casings in the area.

On July 6, 2011, a business linked to the Hells Angels on Logan Avenue was hit by a firebomb again, but the Molotov cocktail failed to properly ignite. The building had already been targeted prior and received damage.

On July 7, 2011, the Vendettas Winnipeg East chapter clubhouse on Canberra Road was shot at, causing minimal damage and nobody was injured. The next day, a home on Stranmillis Avenue belonging to Critical J of the Rock Machine was firebombed and shot at. The next day a belonging to his parents was shot at and firebombed. On July 9, 2011, the Rock Machine firebombed a Hells Angels associated auto shop on St. Mary's Road. It had been the same location that Rock Machine member, Corey Cadotte was attacked in an incident in January 2010. It was this event that caused the Rock Machine to start retaliating. On July 11, 2011, a building on Taft Crescent that formerly acted as the Vendettas main Winnipeg chapter clubhouse was strafed with bullets, an innocent 14-year-old boy was struck in the lower back but survived the incident. Rock Machine members agreed to speak to CTV News and give an interview on the ongoing violence, in the interview an unnamed Rock Machine stated:

In Winnipeg, we never shot a helpless 14-year-old kid and (never) tried to kill two elderly people collecting pensions. We have a code and ethics. If we have a problem with somebody we deal with it ourselves.

The members told CTV News the main reason for accepting the interview was to try and clear the opinion being established about them by the media, countering media reports which they said were "biased".

We are a motorcycle club not a gang. We want to ride our bikes and wear our patches. We don't want kids walking down our front lawn and taking a bullet.

On July 13, 2011, the Rock Machine Manitoba ordered the Vendettas Motorcycle Club to retaliate for the attacks over the past week. The Vendettas Crew firebombed the Hells Angels owned, 187 Ink tattoo parlour on Osborne Street with Molotov cocktails. Members of the Winnipeg gang unit had witnessed the entire arson occur while monitoring the area. They immediately called the fire department before the blaze got out of control, though it did manage to cause thousands of dollars in damage to the business. The police also arrested two members of the Vendettas support club. Full-patch Vendettas member, Taylor Morrison and Vendettas prospect, Shaine Stodgell were detained by officers at the scene. Stodgell was seen by authorities breaking the window and throwing the incendiary inside the building. Morrison was sentenced to 30 months in prison for his part in the incident. When Stodgell was finally sentenced in 2012, he was granted 14 months served, this left him 13 months on his sentence. He was also given two years probation upon release. This was due to fact it was his first criminal incident and he was at low risk to reoffend.

On August 9, 2011, three Police officers were injured when a Dodge Avenger crashed into multiple police vehicles at a routine traffic stop. Three officers were transported to hospital one with serious injuries after, the Averager allegedly hit two marked police cruisers and an unmarked truck all of which according to the Winnipeg Police sustained serious damage, authorities took two members of the Rock Machine associated Vendettas Motorcycle Club and a woman into custody and seized a loaded pistol. During 2010 the Rock Machine had begun to retaliate and the conflict reached a height over the summer months of 2011, with several brawls/assaults, shootings and fire-bombings linked to the groups, The conflict resulted in 2 dead and over 20 injured, including three police officers and an innocent child. The RM support club, the Vendettas Motorcycle Club emerged victorious over the Redline and eventually established four chapters in Manitoba (Winnipeg, Winnipeg East, Brandon, Thompson), by the fall fighting decreased with the Rock Machine gaining the upper hand.

In September 2011, Operation Flatline resulted in the arrests of 25 more members of the Hells Angels and Redlined MC, further weakening their influence in Manitoba. 9 of the 25 would receive full convictions. Police stated during the court meeting, "Since January 2010, there have been in excess of 20 incidents reported and almost as many unreported incidents of violence between the Redlined/Hells Angels and Vendettas/Rock Machine".

In early November 2011, the Rock Machine or Vendettas bombed a house belonging to a member of the Hells Angels. The explosive used was crude and homemade, little damage was caused. On the same day, a Redlined member was assaulted, the court documents stated he refused medical treatment.

In December 2011, after the Hells Angels business on Logan Avenue had been repaired it was subject to attack by the Rock Machine for a third time, causing more damage.

By this point the conflict had mostly ceased, the Rock Machine was able to boost its profits and focus on expansion. It was later revealed during court processes, that the Manitoba Rock Machine had a large amount of their drugs supplied to them by the Montreal chapter. It was stated by RCMP Sgt. Travis Charlton,

"They were getting several kilos of cocaine a month into Winnipeg and that was being distributed from the patch members down to their friends and associates who were selling it at the ounce level and smaller", He added the investigation revealed a good chunk of drugs were coming from Quebec, "from the Rock Machine members in the Montreal area."

These events resulted in the Rock Machine sending reinforcements to consolidate the advantage they had gained, this included members of another RMMC created support club, the SS Elite Motorcycle Club (which has chapters in Ontario and Quebec). It is described by a Rock Machine spokesperson as a "strike force with rules and mentality modeled after the Waffen SS created to protect the Third Reich." As a support club it is tasked with providing security and manpower, support, enforcement and logistics to any Rock Machine MC chapter. The SS Elite MC reports to the Mother chapter in Quebec but is also required to support local chapters across the country. For those that complete this task for the duration of the probationary period, they will receive request to become members of the Rock Machine Motorcycle Club. During this period the Rock Machine Manitoba signed an alliance with the Outlaws Motorcycle Club Manitoba chapters. In March 2012, high-ranking Rock Machine members from Manitoba, British Columbia and Ontario are reported to have traveled to Montreal to meet with Quebec-based members.

On November 8, 2011, members of the newly arrived SS Elite Motorcycle Club joined the Rock Machine Winnipeg chapter for "church". Strachan explained the groups role in the province to his fellow Rock Machine. The entire meeting was captured on audio by the RCMP. They were brought in to assist the Manitoba Rock Machine chapter as it worked towards increasing its numbers and ranks, and the size of its territory. It was also throw off any potential police pressure, as these men could now do the dirty work. The members of the SS Elite told the Rock Machine that they had been tasked to enforce, support and provide manpower to the Winnipeg chapter. There was discussion about the possibility of promotion to Rock Machine for the SS Elite members, should they prove themselves. The Rock Machine were in the process of establishing themselves in Dauphin, Manitoba. A member of the SS Elite inquired about selling drugs there, he was told that it was no issue.

"The north is a money maker." "You are in RM country ... Manitoba is RM country", the documents say. "As full patch SS Elite members, they could do whatever they want wherever they want within the province of Manitoba, The Rock Machine's cocaine supply is referred to as the "food". "You must "eat" from your own chapter, if nobody in the chapter has any "food", then you can go elsewhere".

In February 2012, Manitoba RCMP and the Brandon Police Service started Operation Deplete. This was a project targeting several groups in Manitoba, this included the Rock Machine, Manitoba Warriors, Independent Soldiers and Hells Angels. 80 officers raided several locations across the province. Authorities seized over $1,000,000 in cocaine, methamphetamine, oxycodone and fentanyl. A total of 13 members from four different organizations were arrested and charged with drug trafficking. Eight other individuals were also taken into custody. The operation had been successful due to the police using their tactic of gaining information from paid informants.

On October 14, 2012, Jean Paul Beaumont, the acting Sergeant at Arms for the Rock Machine Winnipeg chapter, died while incarcerated at the Brandon Correctional Centre. An autopsy to determine if "foul play" was suspected, was carried out. Later the autopsy ruled Beaumont's death to be non-criminal in nature.

The Rock Machine prospered for a 2-year period setting up several support clubs, such as the Hell Hounds MC and New Blood MC. In 2012, they had established a second chapter in Winnipeg dubbed the Eastside chapter. They were also in the process of establishing a third "hang-around" chapter near Dauphin, Manitoba. A club spokesperson mentioned to media that the Rock Machine, including its support clubs, had around 72 members, prospects or hang-arounds in the province "not involved in crime". During this time the Rock Machine established a legitimate company "Rock Machine Media Incorporated." Its purpose was to weaken any police claim the RM was explicitly involved in criminal activity, a member of the Rock Machine stated, "This business ... would allow RM members to claim that they are shareholders in a legitimate business and that they derive income from it ... the goal is the long term viability and sustainability of the RM for the benefit of all."

On January 29, 2013, Winnipeg Police and the RCMP are involved at a situation in the area of Wall Street near Portage Avenue in Winnipeg. A police bomb disposal robot had been used by tactical officers, Few details were made publicly available.

On January 30, 2013, raids were conducted in 13 different locations across the province, mostly in the provincial capital of Winnipeg. The raids saw the participation of over 140 RCMP and local police officers. This was a part of Operation Dilemma, the RCMP project targeting the Rock Machine in Winnipeg. It resulted in the arrest of 5 full-patch members of the Rock Machine (this included a paid informant, so 4) and one prospect member from the club's Winnipeg chapter. One of those arrested was Rock Machine international president, Joseph "Critical J" Strachan, these events would cause the Rock Machine to temporarily freeze there Winnipeg chapter. The Rock Machine's support club's were also targeted by police. This led to the arrests of members from the SS Elite Motorcycle Club, Hell Hounds MC and the Vendettas MC. Initially in total 11 people had it been arrested, 9 faced serious charges. This included charges of narcotics and weapon distribution, possession of prohibited weapons without a license, possession of explosives and several other incidents linked to the conflict in Manitoba. Following the investigation a few other associates were also arrested, this included independent drug dealers that did business with the Rock Machine Motorcycle Club. This event also saw the confiscation of large amounts of narcotics and firearms, this would include in total 13 lbs of cocaine (estimated value of almost $500,000), almost 10 lbs of marijuana (estimated value of $45,000), almost 2,000 tablets of Benzylpiperazine (a synthetic drug similar to ecstasy, valued at $45,000-50,000), six firearms including pistols, combat rifles and accompanying ammunition. Ten explosive devices were also seized, including two pipe bombs and 8 commercial grade explosives (C-4 and dynamite), along with "significant" amounts of cash totaling to almost $1 million. These raids had been successful for authorities in temporarily freezing the Rock Machine's operations in the province. In early 2012, the Rock Machine Winnipeg chapter had 17 full-patch members. Besides the transfer of Steven King along with a few others to the Toronto chapter in Ontario, it maintained moderate strength. Despite the media reporting that the authorities had "crushed" the entire chapter, only 5 of the chapters estimated 12 to 14 full-patch members had been arrested. These members remained active in the province and were involved in reestablishing the chapter in the following years.

These events were all possible due to a member of the Rock Machine Winnipeg chapter who accepted a $500,000 payout from the RCMP to become an informant, evidence he provided was critical in the operation, He had also been wearing a listening device at several club meetings. Len Isnor a member of the biker enforcement unit in Ontario stated.

"While they may temporarily disrupt the activity of the organization themselves, and certainly this was a blow to the Rock Machine, I think this is probably temporary."

Mike McIntyre, is the justice and courts reporter for the Winnipeg Free Press, and a veteran crime journalist/reporter. He stated he's not so sure the bust will successfully bring down the Rock Machine. "There is no shortage of resources or experience amongst Rock Machine ranks, the club's facing a new enemy as internal strife – a result of a paid informant laying the web for Project Dilemma – has put the club on edge in a big way. It puts a target on these guys. They know now that they're not exactly going to get a free pass in this city. This project, like so many others, utilized a full-patch member as an informant so the police got someone to turn on their brothers, if you will, for a price. That, no doubt, must create a sense of paranoia amongst these gang members, these bikers."

Police we're not able to confirm how many Rock Machine members and associates remained active after the raid, as the club had "gone dark" to avoid any further arrests. Some officials believed that they had eliminated the entire Rock Machine. But sources told McIntyre they're regaining their footing and rebuilding, "They're certainly out there. Its not like McDonald's if they have a bunch of employees leave and they now have to go on a hiring spree where they put an ad in the paper and a bunch of people apply, it works a lot different in the crime world, you have to prove that loyalty and that trust."

This statement proved to be correct as The Rock Machine still have a chapter and active members in the province. In 2018, information about the Rock Machine's activity in Manitoba was spoken about via Thomas Barker's new book. It was stated by the RCMP despite Project Dilemma, the Rock Machine was still active and involved in the trafficking of narcotics and firearms in the province.

On April 27, 2018, Dallas Friesen, a former member of the Rock Machine's Winnipeg and Thompson chapters, was assaulted while incarcerated at the Stony Mountain Institution north of Winnipeg. Friesen had previously been removed from the Rock Machine Motorcycle Club and was not on good terms with them. Without the protection of his club, he became a target and had to be placed in "protective custody" while serving His prior sentence in British Columbia. On April 26, 2018, he was transferred to Stoney Mountain from Milner Ridge Correctional Centre. The next day, he was lured into the bathrooms where he was told another inmate wanted to have to have a word with him. He was beaten badly, to the point of unconsciousness, later in April 2020, he would sue prison authorities for their negligence.

=== Quebec ===
In April 1992, Giovanni Cazzetta Co-founder of the Rock Machine, was arrested by police and charged with trafficking narcotics, police found him to be in position of 3 kilograms of cocaine. He was forced to plead guilty to four charges the following spring and would be sentenced to four years in prison, Giovanni was released in 1997 and briefly participated in the Quebec Biker War.

The arrest of Rock Machine National President, Salvatore Cazzetta led to the conflict known as the Quebec Biker War, which was fought between the Rock Machine and the Hells Angels for control of territory in Quebec. It would last from 1994 until 2002 it would come to be known as the deadliest biker conflict in history. On July 13, 1994, three Rock Machine associates walked into a motorcycle shop on Henri-Bourassa Blvd. E. in Rivière-des-Prairies and killed Pierre Daoust. Daoust, a 34-year-old member of a Hells Angels puppet club called the Death Riders, was working in his custom motorcycle shop when the three men, whose faces were hidden by masks and a motorcycle helmet, called out to him twice to make sure they had the right target. They proceeded to shoot Daoust in the head and torso at least 16 times. He was taken to a hospital and declared dead less than an hour later.

On July 14, 1994, one day after Daoust was killed, the Rock Machine attempted to kill Normand Robitaille, a member of a Hells Angels support club, the Montreal Rockers. He survived the shooting and would go on to become one of the Hells Angels' most powerful members in Quebec. On the same day, the Sûreté du Québec announced they had arrested five members of the Rock Machine MC, one of the dominant groups in the Alliance, after uncovering a plot to blow up the South Shore clubhouse of a Hells Angels support club called the Evil Ones.

On November 4, 1994, Rock Machine member Daniel Bertrand, was shot dead while drinking in a Montreal bar. On December 4, 1994, another Rock Machine member, Bruno Bandiera, was killed when his bomb he was transporting in his car exploded prematurely. On January 1, 1995, Normand Baker, a Rock Machine member was murdered while drinking in a Hard Rock Cafe in Acapulco, Mexico by the Hells Angel Françoise Hinse. Baker had been one of the killers of Daoust.

On January 30, 1995, Jacques Ferland, a chemist who worked for the Rock Machine was murdered in his Quebec City home, by the Hells Angels hitman Serge Qusnel. On 27 February 1995, Claude Cossette, a Rock Machine member was shot dead as he was sitting in his van. On September 15, 1995, Richard "Crow" Émond was gunned down in a parking lot while helping his girlfriend get out of a car, becoming the first fully patched Hells Angel to be killed by the Rock Machine. Nine bombs exploded around the province during his funeral targeting several Hells Angels businesses and allies, including one explosion that accidentally killed three Rock Machine members who were attempting to plant a bomb outside of the clubhouse of the Angels' support club, the Jokers but were accidentally killed when the bomb exploded prematurely, the rest of the bombs detonated successfully. This series of violence related to Operation Wolverine, a police crackdown on both groups in which 130 were arrested.

On December 7, 1995, police arrested Yves "Flag" Gagné, a prominent member of the Hells Angels' Trois-Rivières chapter, and Guy Majeau, a member of the Rowdy Crew in Lanaudiere, a Hells Angels support club. Authorities also arrested Normand Lortie, an associate of the Angels and owner of a Laval strip club. All three were charged with conspiring to murder prominent members of the Rock Machine and the affiliated Dark Circle; the targets of the plot were founding members of the Rock Machine, this included Porter and Richard "Bam Bam" Lagace, also Dark Circle member Louis-Jacques Deschenes. Porter would later survive another assassination attempt, when he was shot in the shoulder by a contract killer hired by the Hells Angels. These events caused him and some other members to go into hiding in Ontario in 1999. While in Ontario the Hells Angels and their support clubs took over his personal territory in downtown Montreal.

In January 1996, a Hells Angels associate, Glenn Cormier, was murdered by the Rock Machine in Quebec City.

Steinert who was a Full-Patch Hells Angel was the largest pimp in Montreal, owning the Sensations escort service, whose office in Montreal was destroyed in a case of arson in August 1996 by the Rock Machine. Also in August 1996, Salvatore Cazzetta, who was being held in the Parthenais Detention Center prior to his extradition to the United States, was attacked and wounded by six other prisoners in a "jailhouse contract". In October 1996, two Rock Machine members, Christian Deschesnes and Renaud Jomphe, were shot dead while eating at a Chinese restaurant in Verdun. In November 1996, the Rock Machine planted a bomb in the old Hells Angels bunker in St. Nicholas and the residential neighborhood where it was located was shaken by the immense force of the blast. The bunker received significant damage. In December 1996, Bruno Van Lerberghe, a member of the Quebec City chapter of the Hells Angles, was killed while eating at a restaurant, being shot six times, no one was ever charged with the killing but authorities assume it was by a member or members of the Rock Machine.

In late 1996, the Carcajou squad as part of Operation Carcajou, decided the best way to end the conflict was to put the Rock Machine out of business, arguing that the Rock Machine was the smaller of the two clubs, and the war would end once the Rock Machine was removed from the scene. On January 29, 1997, seven Rock Machine members were arrested on charges of conspiracy to commit murder in connection with the failed murder plot against Boucher in 1994. In May 1997, the Rock Machine clubhouses in Montreal and Quebec City were raided while the police arrested 18 Rock Machine members and seized 325 kilos (716.5 lbs) of explosives. The police confiscated the Montreal clubhouse after drugs were found within the premises. On March 28. 1997, Rocker member Aimé Simard, stating he was acting under the orders of the Rocker president, a man known as Gregory "Pissaro" Wooley, murdered Rock Machine member Jean-Marc Caissy as he entered a Montreal arena to play hockey with his friends.

In early 1997, Giovanni Cazzetta was released from prison, he would return to the Rock Machine and was giving the position of National President in his brother's absence. He would lead the club through the conflict until May 1997. In May Giovanni was subject to a police sting in which a man from Alberta attempted to purchase 15 kilos of cocaine, This individual turned out to be an informant for the crown. The mules, Frank Bonneville and Donald Waite, that delivered the cocaine to the informant were arrested and the narcotics seized by police, Matticks, Bonneville, and Waite pled guilty on June 17, 1997, and were sentenced to three, four, and two years respectively. Giovanni now the leader of the Rock Machine attempted to fight the charges brought against him, however he would lose these appeals and was sentenced to nine years prison time in April 1998.

At the same, the Great Nordic Biker War was taking place, and the Rock Machine was impressed with the way that the Scandinavian branches of the Bandidos held their own against the Scandinavian branches of the Hells Angels. In June 1997, the three leaders of the Rock Machine, Fred Faucher, Johnny Plescio, and Robert "Tout Tout" Léger, went to Stockholm to seek support from the Swedish branch of the Bandidos, but were expelled by the Swedish police, who declared that they did not want Canadian bikers in their country. Faucher had gained wide attention in underworld circles by blowing up the Hells Angels clubhouse in Quebec City in February 1997 and after the Rock Machine's leader Claude "Ti-Loup" Vézina was arrested for drug smuggling, he became the Rock Machine's new National President on September 11, 1997.

In mid 1997, an imprisoned Hells Angel, Denis Houle, was the victim of an unsuccessful assassination attempt when a Rock Machine member opened fire on him from beyond the prison fence. On August 23, 1998, a team of Rock Machine killers consisting of Frédéric Faucher, Gerald Gallant, and Marcel Demers rode by on their motorcycles and gunned down Paolo Cotroni in his driveway. Cotroni was a member of the Calabrian 'Ndrangheta Cotroni crime family who were the rivals of the Sicilian Mafia Rizzuto crime family. Cotroni was killed partly to gain the favor of the Rizzutos and partly because he was a friend of Boucher.

On September 8, 1998, Johnny Plescio—a founding member of the Rock Machine—was at his Laval home watching television when his cable was severed. As he rose to see what was wrong with his television, 27 bullets went through Plescios's living room window, 16 of which struck him. At Plescio's funeral, a flower arrangement appeared bearing the word Bandidos, which was the first sign that the Bandidos Motorcycle Club of Texas was taking an interest in the Rock Machine. In May 1999, the Rock Machine became hang around Club of the Bandidos (were promoted to a probationary club in December 2000). Shortly after the National president, Fred Faucher was arrested on charges of importing cocaine into Canada and Rock Machine new president became Alain "Red Tomato" Brunette.

In March 1999, Gaétan Michelin was a member of the Jokers Motorcycle Club, a support club for the Hells Angels. He had been tasked with the transportation of four hockey bags containing large amounts of marijuana. He had asked for a local trucker to store the bags for him, only for the trucker to be robbed at gunpoint by four members of the Rock Machine. The trucker had managed to hide one of the bags before they arrived. The Joker's believed that the Rock Machine had help from inside the club, due to the fact that they seemed to know where and how many bags the Jokers had. When entering the property one member of the Rock Machine said "There's only three bags. Where's the other one?" The next day, Michelin's corpse was found on the side of a rural road, he had been shot in the head.

Despite a promise from the police that the violence would stop, on October 1, 1999, one of the leaders of Rock Machine, Tony Plescio, brother of Johnny Plescio, was gunned down in the parking lot of a Montreal McDonald's where he was taking his family to dinner. On April 17, 2000, Normand Hamel, one of the Nomads, was killed when attempting to flee from Rock Machine assassins in a Laval parking lot while he and his wife were taking his son to the doctor. Hamel was the most senior Hells Angel to be killed in the biker war.

On January 16, 2000, Sébastien Garneau, a Hells-Angels associate, was murdered in a bar on Notre-Dame Street West, in Montreal. On January 26, 2000, the Rock Machine targeted, Charles-Édouard Ménard and his brother, Daniel Ménard, they were shot dead in front of an IGA store in the Hochelaga-Maisonneuve district of Montreal.

The next day, on January 27, 2000, in the early afternoon, Israel Meyer Randolph, 46, was shot three times and killed, in the Côte-Saint-Luc Bar-BQ restaurant located in Côte-Saint-Luc; the police believe it is a settling of scores, Randolph being a compulsive gambler who had large gambling debts; as he had been sentenced to 24 months in prison in 1991 for his participation in the trafficking of 44 kg of hashish. The police did not rule out the possibility that his death was linked to this kind of trade; the murder weapon registered in Chicago in 1964, it was left at the scene and exhibited no fingerprints or traces of DNA. On March 26, 2009, Rock Machine assassin; Gérald Gallant admitted to killing Randolph.

On January 28, 2000, Marius Poulin, a Hells Angels associate, was shot dead in the courtyard of the Jean-Baptiste-Meilleur school, rue Fullum, near rue de Rouen in Montreal.

On February 1, 2000, Daniel Savard, an associate of the Rock Machine was murdered in his residence in Sainte-Catherine-de-la-Jacques-Cartier, near Montreal.

On May 12, 2000, the Angels tried to kill the two Rock Machine members, Tony Duguay and Denis Boucher, suspected of killing Hamel, leading to a wild car crash, during which Duguay took bullet wounds to his arms, right hand, and thigh. Tony Duguay, the Rock Machine member who was convicted of killing Hamel in 2006, was acquitted in 2016 when it was established that the eyewitness who gave the testimony that had convicted him had been fed information incriminating him by Detective Benoît Roberge, the senior anti-biker detective with the Montreal police who was secretly working for the Hells Angels, and that the witness had not actually seen Duguay killing Hamel as he had testified during his trial.

In July 2000, Boucher's plans to set up an internet company were derailed when Robert "Bob" Savard, the loan shark who charged a 52% interest on the loans he made to the desperate and needy, was gunned down at the Déjeuners Eggstra! restaurant in the north end of Montreal, Savard had been a Hells Angels associate for several years and was considered a right-hand man for Boucher. Savard's dinner companion, Normand Descoteaux, a hockey player turned loan shark, was also a target, but he survived by grabbing a waitress, Hélène Brunet, and using her as an involuntary human shield, ensuring that she took four bullets meant for him. Despite the way Brunet took bullets in her arms, legs and shin, Descoteaux was not charged. The shooter's were infamous Canadian hitman, Gerald Gallant and an unidentified associate of his. Gallant was employed by a member of the Dark Circle and also frequently carried out contracts for the Rock Machine during the conflict with the Hells Angels, between the years of 1980–2003, he was responsible for 28 murders and 13 attempted murders. His most active years were during the Quebec Biker War, where he killed two members of Hells Angels support clubs in 1997 and a third survived an assassination attempt. In 1998 when he eliminated five men, including Paul Cotroni Jr., son of deposed mob boss Frank Cotroni, making 1998 his most prominent year as a hitman, also at periods worked for the Irish-Canadian West End Gang.

On December 6, 2000, 255 police officers tracked and arrested 16 Rock Machine members and associated on narcotics trafficking charges. The "ring", operated by Marcel Demers Leader of the Beauport chapter and National president Fred Faucher of the Quebec City chapter, were accused of distributed more than two kilograms of cocaine a month and generated almost $5 million in profits annually. On June 5, 2002, Operation Amigo was launched by police. This operation had initially gone under a different title and was created to target the Rock Machine as a result of the conflict in Quebec. When the Rock Machine patched over to the Bandidos they became the main focus. The raids led to the arrests of 63 former members of the Rock Machine Motorcycle Club, including all of its Quebec manpower and many other associates. This put an end to the conflict with the Hell Angels, as it was the first time since the start of the war that both sides had large numbers of men and their respective leaders in custody and facing charges. All in all it is the deadliest recorded biker conflict in history with over 162 dead, over 180 wounded, 300 attempted assassinations, 500 plus arrests and 20 people missing. It also cost the government of Canada and Quebec millions of dollars in damages with 84 bombings, and 130 cases of arson.

The 63 defendants, belonged mostly to the provinces of Quebec and Ontario. Ontario had 7 members arrested, 54 members were arrested in Quebec and one from New Brunswick. They were charged with a series of crimes including; gangsterism, murder, conspiracy to murder, possession of weapons and trafficking in all possible types of narcotics: cannabis, hashish, cocaine, heroin, ecstasy, GHB, Viagra and even steroids. The results of the raids in Kingston, Toronto, Niagara, Montreal, Quebec City and Val-d'Or were fruitful, the authorities seized close to forty firearms, 197 kilos of hashish, fourteen kilos of cocaine, 200 marijuana plants, clothing and equipment with the colours of the Bandidos, CDs and books containing personal information about their opposition and over $125,000 in cash. The former Rock Machine had been trying for the last year, since operation Springtime, to recapture their territory, as well as claim territory that had become open when the Hells Angels were arrested. They had even made deals with the powerful Canadian Rizzuto crime family and the West End Gang to do just this, but the Quebec police did not give the opportunity.

- Modern crimes and incidents

The Rock Machine Motorcycle Club would officially join the Bandidos January 6, 2001. The club would eventually re-emerge in late 2007, after the events of the Shedden Massacre. The Rock Machine also temporarily became active in Quebec again in 2007, members of the club were spotted in Downtown Montreal and North Shore. They would return permanently in 2009, unfreezing their Montreal chapter, that year 20 members of the club were sighted in an exotic dance club in downtown Montreal. The first International meeting of the Rock Machine occurred in April 2011. Dozens of Rock Machine members from Canada, Australia, Germany, the United States, including the Nevada chapter, met in a luxury hotel in Montreal, to consolidate friendship and discuss the club's International presence. In July 2011, Ten members of the Rock Machine from several provinces Quebec, Manitoba and British Columbia were arrested at Chez Pare, a famous downtown strip club. On March 24, 2012, 20 members of the Rock Machine Montreal chapter were seen at Amazones, a club in West Montreal. Local authorities were alarmed and spoke with the group but no issues occurred.

In spring of 2013, raids by the Sûreté du Québec led to the arrests of fifteen members of the Rock Machine from the Montreal and Quebec City chapters. Several members of the SS Elite Motorcycle Club (a Rock Machine support club) were also arrested, all were brought up on narcotics charges. This was due to a police operation against a large network of narcotics traffickers who operated in Montérégie. In March 2014, two full-patch members of the SS Elite Motorcycle Club, Joseph "Fuego" Fluet and Yann "Loco" Séguin were arrested by Quebec police for uttering death threats, they also seized Rock Machine paraphernalia. The SS Elite support club was created by the Rock Machine in Ontario. The SS Elite club patches actually consist of a Rock Machine MC center-patch and top-rocker, however they are given a bottom-rocker that says "SS Elite SS", instead of the classic 1% diamond, they have a diamond patch containing "SS". They also have an SS Elite patch on the front instead of Rock Machine, along with their ranking in the club, they also wear the Rock Machine's A.LV.A.L.M patch. In early April 2014, Mathieu Bellemare, a full-patch member of the Rock Machine's Montreal chapter was arrested by police for criminal harassment. Authorities also seized Rock Machine paraphernalia.

On April 8, 2014, Sûreté du Québec carried out 4 raids in the municipalities of Saint-Rémi, Saint-Michel and Saint -Patrice-de-Sherrington and dismantled 3 drug trafficking cells; this led to the arrest of 13 people, who were either members or associates of the Rock Machine (9 men and 4 women). Out of the 15 covered by the warrants were arrested, including prominent Rock Machine member, Gilles "Bazou" Rondeau. A former member of the Palmers MC and Original Rock Machine. He had been arrested during Operation Amigo on June 5, 2002; the police seized several kinds of drugs. More than 1,000 methamphetamine tablets and at least 5 prohibited weapons, 2 bulletproof vests and more than $4,000 in cash. On January 3, 2015, Quebec police arrested a full-patch member of the Rock Machine in Joliette, Quebec. Philip Bergamo of the Rock Machine Quebec was charged with five counts of obstructing justice, possession of a prohibited weapon, possession of a weapon with intent to cause harm, intimidation and possession of narcotics. He would be released on bail shortly after.

Also in 2015, three members of the Rock Machine Montreal chapter were imprisoned for their involvement in fraud incident. This included Jason Fluet, who had recently been promoted from the SS Elite Motorcycle Club. They had made a deal with someone to invest $60,000 in one of their businesses, after receiving it they notified the individual that his contribution had been rejected by his bank. They then showed up at the man's residence and demanded he hand over a two vehicles worth $30,000, $30,000 in cash and a demand in interest, which he agreed to several days later the victim learned that his shares had actually been cashed by the bank and he called the police. The Rock Machine had robbed him of a collective amount of $120,000. Quebec Police arrested Fluet and two full-patch members of the Rock Machine for intimidation and fraud. During the subsequent raid in Montreal, they seized three "cuts" displaying Rock Machine colours and patches and "significant" amounts of narcotics.

On June 9, 2016, Quebec Police arrested three members of the Rock Machine in raids, the 3 members including a former president faced charges related to narcotics trafficking, conspiracy and possession of prohibited weapons. The emergency response team, including armored vehicles, took part in the operation leading to the arrests. four firearms were seized, this included a "9 mm pistol, 357 revolver, 25 caliber pistol and a prohibited automatic impulse weapon" were seized during the raids. The police also found various narcotics including over 10,000 methamphetamine pills, pounds of cocaine, GHB, cannabis and "Large amounts of cash"

In December 2016, two members of the Rock Machine Joseph Fluet and Steven Lamarsh were shot and killed in Vaudreuil-Dorion, they had been led into a trap by a girlfriend of an associate of theirs. She had told the bikers that her boyfriend, Richard Hunt who owed them money wanted to meet them at a certain location to dig up cash that he had buried there from the robbery of a Garda armored truck in 2011. Once at the location Hunt was waiting with a loaded rifle and opened fire on the two men killing them both. Hunt was charged with two counts of first degree murder and his girlfriend Mélanie Binette, who had lured the men to their deaths received 17 years in prison for her part in the killings. Fluet had initially joined the Rock Machine as a hang-around just prior to them becoming Bandidos in 2001. In the 2010s he would become a leading member in the SS Elite Motorcycle Club, which was a Rock Machine created support club. After Fluet's arrest in 2014, he began to recruit hardened criminals for the Rock Machine while inside prison. After his brief prison sentence he had been released and returned to the Rock Machine only to be arrested again. Before his death, he was sentenced along with two other members to almost 2 years in prison for the fraud case.

On June 23, 2018, dozens of Rock Machine members and prospects attended a "Patch-over" ceremony in Saint-Dominique for several new members in the province. The meeting was held on a fenced-in property with The Rock Machine Motorcycle Clubs flag being flown proudly. In August 2018, an inmate who had past ties to the Rock Machine Motorcycle Club was murdered by fellow inmates with assumed association to the Rock Machine, it was rumored that he was a police informant. It is estimated by Police that these recent attacks or death's of past or faction Rock Machine members could have been an internal issue or a "clean up".

In March 2019, the Sûreté du Québec conducted a raid on a Rock Machine Farnham chapter clubhouse in the town of Farnham, Quebec. The interior of the clubhouse was painted in the Black and Platinum the colors of the Rock Machine MC, the main room had a stage and a vertical pole dance bar, an alcohol service counter and pool tables. Le Journal noted "The logo is prominently featured on the back with the inscriptions "NO MERCY" and "ALVALM" (À la vie, à la mort, the group's motto). At the entrance of the build, a list of rules and regulations to be observed is displayed. They were only able to charge two members of the Rock Machine. They were arrested and large amounts of alcohol and narcotics were seized, along with nine Rock Machine vests and illegal firearms.

In December 2019, it was rumoured that Liberal Prime Minister, Justin Trudeau had been sighted in the company of members of the Rock Machine Motorcycle Club in Montreal. There had been a video posted to YouTube, that supposedly showed Mr. Trudeau partying with Rock Machine members and strippers in his hometown. However the video was deleted soon after its release.

- Rock Machine Factions in Canada

The division of the Rock Machine in Canada was caused by German member, Suat Erköse. After several police raids in 2013 and 2014, many high-ranking members of the Rock Machine went to prison. With its Canadian leadership temporarily sidelined. Erköse worked with Canadian Jean-François Emard, to undermine the leadership of newly elected Rock Machine international president, "Rude Boy". Emard, who was a member of the Toronto chapter at the time, chose side with Erköse for personal gain. Erköse claimed the title of European president, this caused a split in the Rock Machine Germany. Apparently no vote occurred. Many of the Canadian members, especially those from Ontario did not agree to this, so the Erköse faction claimed they were out of the club. On February 14, 2014, a Facebook post from Erköse's Rock Machine stated, that all Rock Machine chapters in Ontario had been frozen and that leaders Rude Boy, Stephan Martin and Ron Concho were placed "out in bad standing". With Rude Boy and other high-ranking members either in jail or out of the club because of Emard's actions, Suat Erköse laid claim to the title of international president. In December 2013, Emard would find himself briefly arrested for drug trafficking. Upon his release in early 2014, for his efforts Jean-François Emard was given the rank of world vice-president in the "World Chapter" and was also made the leader of Erköse's faction in Canada until 2018, when his chapters either dissolved or rejoined the official Rock Machine.

These events resulted in three versions of the Rock Machine in Canada. The official Rock Machine Canada which was let by the international Nomads under "Prophet Rock". The Erköse faction under Jean-François Emard. And thirdly the 13th Legion (New Order) faction under Mario Dubé, which was created in Quebec during these initial issues. It was aligned with the official Rock Machine Motorcycle Club and most of its members would reunify in 2018. In 2014, Jean-François Émard faction gave permission for an interview with La Presse, Émard tried to discredit the 13th Legion stating, "the Rock Machines of the 13th legion who multiply their interventions in the media are not members of the motorcycle club, are not recognized by the world section, do not pay their 'tithing' and have never been accepted by the organization." He stated this despite fact the 13th Legion was aligned and supported by the legitimate Rock Machine Motorcycle Club.

On July 12, 2016, Francis Gauthier, a member of the Emard/Erköse faction of the Rock Machine was arrested in Quebec. He had attempted to rob a convenience store's safe and had tied up the cashier in Trois-Rivières. He also threatened her with a firearm. Prior to this while in Montreal, he was involved in an incident where he threw a soda into a homeless man's face. When media wrote a story saying he was a legitimate member of the Rock Machine it caused the Rock Machine Canada and 13th Legion faction to respond. The Montreal Journal wrote a story on these tensions: its headline, "Behind bars, members in good standing with the Rock Machine are furious against one of their own, who has been multiplying the escapades for a few weeks and who, according to them, is tarnishing the image of the organization. Several long-time members of the Rock Machine jumped Friday morning when they read the article about Francis Gauthier."

Two full-patch members of the official Rock Machine's Montreal chapter were incarcerated in Montreal. They spoke with the journal and insisted that Francis Gauthier is not a recognized as a legitimate member of the club. A high-ranking senior member of the Rock Machine aggressively stated "He's a clown's ostie, that guy! Tie up the poor little cashier, let's see! You don't do business the same! Gauthier, an "ostie" of a bubble gum thief, we don't want that among us. If I come face to face with him, I break him to pieces. I will take care of it personally." The members went on to state that the Rock Machine is heavily involved in the narcotics trade and does not commit petty crimes like theft unless drugs or money are involved. Mario Dubé, the spokesman of the Rock Machine 13th legion faction, was also imprisoned at this time, he commented: "Francis Gauthier is part of the "clique" (faction) of Jean-François Émard, who gave interviews to various Montreal media in 2014 as claiming to be the "head of the Rock Machine". The members of Jean-François Émard's faction are not real Rock Machine's. Émard, it's a lot of sh*t. He proclaimed himself leader without anyone voting for him. The real things need to be said. This guy is a "goon" and nothing else.

In mid-August 2021, The Rock Machine Black & White faction was formed in Montreal by former faction leader Mario Dube. The new order faction of which he used to be a part of merged with the Rock Machine Canada in 2018, Dube had previously become addicted to drugs and had fallen out of favor with the club so he was not accepted during the merger. This new faction attempted to slightly change the look of the Rock Machine by reversing the color scheme, wearing white leather jackets with white patches, inscribed with black writing. The legitimate Rock Machine Canada denounced these actions. Authorities feared a flare up in tentions as both faction now possessed a chapter in Montreal. This issue would be resolved in early 2022, when the RMMC Black & White faction had their patched striped and burned by the Rock Machine Canada. Its members then "patched-Over" to the Brazil-based Profanum Mundial Motorcycle Club. This completely unified the Rock Machine in Canada and put an end to any division.

=== Ontario ===
On May 22, 1997, Two members of the Rock Machine were arrested by Ontario Provincial Police in Tilbury, Ontario close to the US border. The police confiscated cocaine and two loaded firearms.

On January 2, 2000, Carl Bursey, an associate of the Rock Machine Motorcycle Club bribed a guard with two ounces of cocaine to help him escape from a Guelph detention facility. He was at large for almost 3 weeks until he was arrested on January 24, 2000. Bursey was a career criminal that openly admitted his affiliation with the Rock Machine. He had just previously been sentenced to prison for the theft of $700,000 worth of stolen Harley Davidsons. His criminal record also included, convictions for assault, assault causing bodily harm, escaping custody, uttering death threats, dangerous operation of a motor vehicle and possession of a prohibited weapon.

By 2000, the Rock Machine Motorcycle Club had set-up three chapters (Kingston, Toronto and Sarnia) in Ontario, beating the Hells Angels into the province. During this period the Rock Machine was accused by authorities of planting a bomb in front of a Georgetown, Ontario motorcycle shop, it was successfully defused by authorities after it had been inadvertently transported to Guelph, Ontario. Seven members of the Rock Machine Ontario would be arrested and charged during Operation Amigo in June 2002, these would come from tis Toronto and Kingston chapters. During 2000, the Rock Machine would also establish chapters in London and Niagara Falls.

The Rock Machine was resurrected in Ontario in 2007. The club would reopen its Toronto and Kingston chapters by April 2008. Peter Edwards interviewed the Toronto spokesperson for the Rock Machine. He revealed that the month old chapter was yet to purchase a clubhouse, but that the Toronto chapter had recruited around 24 members, while the Kingston chapter had over a dozen members. Together these chapters would be redubbed Ontario West and Ontario East chapters. While Sean Brown's Rock Machine Nomads continued to host "Church" based out of the Ottawa area. The entire club would be reinforced by the patch over of a Canadian motorcycle club known as "The Crew Motorcycle Club" or The Crew, which had chapters in Woodbridge, Ontario, Huron County, Ontario and in Western Canada, it was said that some of these were veteran bikers, however some new members had never been in a motorcycle club before.

In November 2011, 8 former members and from the Rock Machine's Toronto and Peterborough chapters, along with one former member of the International Nomads chapter, joined the Vagos Motorcycle Club. This included Sean Brown, who was the former international president of the Rock Machine, he had recently been removed from the club in late 2010. This also caused the Rock Machine Ontario to temporarily freeze their Peterborough chapter. This gave the Vagos their first foothold in Canada since there failed attempt in 2008.

In 2007, Brown reestablished the Rock Machine in Ontario, using its original colours. He had been instrumental in its construction and was very effective in expanding the club, so the Vagos sought him out to head operations in Canada. During the three years Brown led the Rock Machine, the club maintained a relatively low profile and expanded, mostly avoiding conflict with both the authorities and opposition. By early 2010, the Rock Machine had significantly expanded. With chapters in Ontario, Manitoba, Alberta, Nova Scotia, New Brunswick and Quebec. They also possessed chapters in Australia, the United States, Germany and Indonesia.

When the Montreal chapter was reformed in 2009, he reluctantly agreed to it. But when the Quebec City chapter was established in mid 2010, it was a sign Brown's hold on control within the club was starting to wane. He was against expanding anymore into Quebec, as to not provoke the Hells Angels. The Rock Machine did not agree with his views, and did not consider them constructive for the club's future. On November 23, 2010, Brown and eight of his close supporters were removed from the club in "bad standing". The explanations for the club vote vary, but sources say those who removed him wanted to expand the Rock Machine faster than Brown allowed. The Toronto Star attempted to gain an interview with Brown. But Brown refused to comment about being removed from the Rock Machine or the incoming Vagos. On December 23, 2011, Brown commented on his Facebook page, "Happy holidays to all my brothers around the world from all of us in the Green Nation Canada", "It was after many long months in the making my brothers and all our love goes out to the Vagos brothers who helped make this happen. Canada's finally gone Green! Live Vagos, Die Vagos." Sean Brown would eventually move to California, where he joined a Vagos USA chapter.

On September 29, 2014, the city of Hawkesbury, Ontario instituted stricter anti biker laws. This was done in an attempt to dissuade the Rock Machine and other outlaw motorcycle clubs from staying or settling in the city. This was for good reason. In 2014, the Rock Machine had established Hawksbury and Vankleek Hill chapters, both of which operated in the nearby area.

The Vagos Nomads chapter located in Peterborough was further reinforced by former members of the Loners Motorcycle Club Peterborough chapter, including prominent member Bob Pammett. The Rock Machine, like the Loners, was intent on competing with the Vagos in the city. With the Peterborough Police reporting that the Rock Machine re-established its Peterborough chapter in late 2014. But by February 2015, a large number of Canadian Vagos had patched over to the Outlaws Motorcycle Club, who were aligned with the Rock Machine.

On April 28, 2016, an altercation occurred between Jackie Lessard, a prospect of the Hells Angels and two members of the Rock Machine at an Esso gas station in Casselman, Ontario. Video footage released from the business showed the prospect on the defense as the Rock Machine Cassleman chapter members got aggressive with him. The Hells Angels Ontario Nomads sought to find a solution to the tensions, Ontario Nomads president, Martin Bernatchez called the Rock Machine and set up a meeting. On April 29, 2016, a group of Hells Angels Nomads, their support club, the Red Devils and associates without status, travelled to Casselman in the early evening for a meeting at the Karina's Pub. The Ontario Provincial Police observed the meeting as a part of their Project Rawson. A lead investigator for the OPP stated "members of the Hells Angels arrived at the bar and took off their jackets to place it on a ramp at the edge of the terrace" of the establishment. Investigator Thibodeau then said: "A full patch (HA) member who removes his colors, this is the first time I've seen that." A few minutes later several members of the Rock Machine Nomads Canada and Cassleman chapters arrived at Karina's Pub and entered. Moments later multiple shots were heard. Video footage filed in evidence by the police shows the Hells Angels Nomads fleeing out of the dance bar, the members of the Rock Machine had opened fire on them inside the building. A few hours apart, two members of the Rock Machine were arrested by the OPP for discharging their firearms with intent to cause harm and illegal possession firearms.

In June 2016, news agencies reported that ongoing tensions between the Rock Machine and their long-time rival the Hells Angels had recommenced in Ontario. This sparked fears that the conflict could spread across the country. During this period the Rock Machine was dealing with a division in Canada. The 13th Legion faction in Quebec was not involved, the conflict would be mostly limited to this incident Ontario This however would cause friction with the Angels in the province. Since the incident, the national leadership of the Rock Machine has maintained a moderate peaceful relationship with the Hell Angels.

In October 2016, it was announced that the Satudarah Motorcycle Club was trying expand by attempting to recruit Rock Machine members. The Satudarah had established themselves in Canada during 2015. Their attempts were mostly unsuccessful as they were unable to expand beyond their single chapter in Toronto. Only a single member of the Rock Machine accepted their offer. Erköse faction member and Rock Machine "disgrace" (see Quebec faction section), Francis Gauthier had been released from prison and was sighted wearing the colours of the Satudarah. Gauthier was the cousin of faction leader, Jean-François Émard.

In 2017, Inspector Larry Charmley, of the Peterborough Police stated that the Rock Machine had been consistently sighted and had become more active in Peterborough. Along with Rock Machine members of the Hells Angels, Outlaws Motorcycle Club and Loners Motorcycle Club have also been active.

The Outlaws, Hells Angels, Rock Machine and other groups are looking for opportunities here. They are worldwide and want to take over territory. We do know that there has been Hells Angels that have been in town, and the Rock Machine has also been around town so we suspect that we are going to see them here more.

Jean-François Émard, the leader of the Erköse faction in Canada had an extensive criminal record, he had originally been a member of the Palmers MC during the Quebec Biker War. In October 2014, Émard had been charged with possession with intent to traffic narcotics and possession of a weapon in Quebec. In 2016, as a result of an incident, he and Pascal Carrier, another member of his faction were arrested and charged with firearms related crimes. In March 2018, Rock Machine-faction leader, Emard received a 33-month sentence after he was convicted of having possessed a firearm and narcotics while wearing Rock Machine "cut". The sentence included a 30-month sentence he received later, on May 2, 2018, he was found guilty of having committed an act of indecent exposure by having intercourse on the hood of a vehicle parked on the side of a public roadway. His imprisonment would cause the Erköse faction to dissolve in Canada, members were either forced to rejoin the legitimate Rock Machine or retire.

In May 2019, now former faction leader, Emard received eligibility for parole however the Penitentiary Correctional Service Canada was advised by police that they "believed his life was in danger. No halfway house was willing to take the risk of having Emard as a resident" as a result parole was suspended, before parole board members, Jean-François Émard declared that the Rock Machine, his former club, had become "a shame" to him, that he was not on friendly terms with them. At the next hearing in July 2019, the ex-biker said he knew where the threats were coming from but dismissed them. Emard was eventually released in February 2020, with a court order that he wear a GPS tracking bracelet. In May 2020, his bracelet revealed he had travelled 50 kilometres outside of the area he was limited to be within, so he was returned to custody, upon his return to prison he was assaulted by other inmates with assumed association to the Rock Machine. The injuries he received were severe enough that it required him to be transferred to an off-site hospital.

On June 26, 2020, a Rock Machine associate was shot and severely injured in Sarnia, Ontario. Authorities declared they believed the shooting to be targeted. A few hours later, a group of Rock Machine members and supporters arrived at the scene of the shooting. They were all wearing Rock Machine paraphernalia, including vests and t-shirts. It was noted that these individuals looked "visibly upset".

=== Saskatchewan ===
On July 27, 2022, three members of the Rock Machine Regina chapter were detained by authorities in Saskatchewan. One member of a separate affiliated motorcycle club, known as the Silent Soldiers Motorcycle Club had warrants issued for his arrest and remains at large. Two other individuals thought to be associates of the Rock Machine are also facing charges. Regina Police seized several items from members of the Rock Machine and its support club. In total, this included six kg of methamphetamine (estimated value of over $570,000), over ten kg of cocaine (estimated value of over $800,000), seven firearms and ammunition (mostly carbines, semi automatic rifles and 12 gauge shotguns), several items of Rock Machine paraphernalia including vests, six motorcycles, five vehicles, one heavy equipment fork lift, multiple cellphones and evidence supporting the theft of vehicle and fraudulent re-vinning processes. They also seized a total of $167,700 in cash.

== Armenia ==
In late 2015, the Rock Machine Motorcycle Club established a hangaround chapter in Yerevan, Armenia. By December 2016, it had been promoted to probationary status. Six members of the Yerevan chapter, along with supporters had been invited to gather at a local dental clinic owned by one of their associates for a party. There they were given permission to give media a limited interview. When asked why they decided to join a motorcycle club a member stated: "We decided to create the club because motorbiking is more than a Sunday hobby. It is a lifestyle". The member went on to say that they were currently a probationary chapter that was intent on proving themselves and earning their full status. The Armenian Rock Machine had been sponsored by the Montreal chapter in Canada. They also expressed their excitement at being part of what they called, a true brotherhood in the Rock Machine.

But it is a strange kind of community where everybody else is a brother. That's not only empty words. If I go to the US and there is a Rock Machine member there, I will consider him as my brother and he will consider me the same way. And whatever my brother needs, whatever I need, we should help each other. It is an international community of brotherhood.

The members also spoke of their love for their motorcycles and how it irritated them that they could not ride during the winter months. When asked if they were bothered by the club's reputation or what it took to become a member, they responded:

"You have to deserve your black leather jacket with the Rock Machine patch sewed on." How?" "We can't tell you." "How many members do you have in the Armenian club? " We can't tell you." When would you be an official chapter of the club ? "Sorry, but again we can't tell." What do you have to do for this ? "Prove allegiance." How? "We can't tell."

The Rock Machine Armenia members stated that they were aware of the club's reputation, however anti biker laws in Armenia are far less stringent than in countries American or Canada. "But it isn't the same in Armenia. First of all, a few know about MC Clubs. And we do not want to make trouble and attract unwanted attention by the police", a member stated. They commented the other plans for the winter were to have music concerts and parties, recruit new members and await the arrival of spring so that they could ride their motorcycles.

=== Georgia ===
In late 2015, "David", originally a member of the Rock Machine Armenia's Yerevan chapter was transferred to the Rock Machine's Moscow chapter in Russia. In November 2015, he traveled to Georgia to meet with the members of the Cross Riders MC, one of Georgia's first motorcycle clubs. The Rock Machine member had been invited as a guest and this was done as a way to establish a relationship between the two groups. (The Rock Machine MC would eventually establish a chapter in Tbilisi, Georgia, possibly with aid from Cross Riders.)

== Australia ==
The Rock Machine established a Nomads chapter in Australia during 2008. In early 2009, the Rock Machine's New South Wales chapter was created in the Sydney area. International president, Sean Brown, of Canada had sponsored the Sydney chapter. A third Rock Machine chapter was established in the Perth suburb of Myaree in mid 2009, this time by then Rock Machine Canada National president, Joseph "Critical J" Strachan, he had visited Australia that summer. The defection of Rebels MC members to the Rock Machine MC sparked an ongoing violent feud between the groups, when the Rock Machine settled in Perth in 2009, there was allegations by media that a turf war broke out between the two rival motorcycle clubs, with exchanges between the two groups including firebombings, assaults and the assassination attempt in 2011 of Rebels WA president Nick Martin, who survived being shot (to see the full series of incidents regarding this conflict please see Rock Machine–Rebels conflict).

On July 1, 2009, two Australia police were assaulted while attempting to arrest a Rock Machine associate. Earlier in the night he had crashed a stretch limousine into another vehicle in Pyrmont, Sydney. The man was charged with failing to stop, driving without a valid license, failing to submit to a breath test, resisting arrest and assaulting officers of the law.

In late 2009, Australian UFC fighter, Soa Palelei was accused of being a member or associate of the notorious Canadian outlaw motorcycle club, Rock Machine. The club has chapters in Australia. Palelei adamantly denied these claims, stating that he was involved in teaching mixed martial arts to two individuals who may be members of the club. The Australian Police later provided evidence of his membership to the Rock Machine, when he was stated to be present at a club event.

By December 2009, the Rock Machine in Australia had grown significantly. Their Perth chapter had over 20 members, while they had established a few new chapters in Eastern Australia. These new chapters had around 60 members between them, including members from the Sydney chapter. The Rock Machine had its first national "Run" in Australia on December 4, 2009. More than 80 Rock Machine members gathered in Perth, they partied at strip clubs before returning to the Perth chapter clubhouse for an after party. Prominent Australian members present included, Brent Reker, Paul "Boof" Samways, Gavin John McMaster, who was a former member of the Rebels MC, former UFC fighter Soa Palelei and Michael Xanthoudakis.

Samways owned a tattoo parlor. In 2007, he had been involved in an altercation with the Coffin Cheaters at a nightclub where he worked as a bouncer. Three other bouncers were stabbed during the brawl and he had lost his motorcycle shop to a case of arson as a result. Palelei also known as "Hulk", was a lifetime mixed martial artist who was competing in the Ultimate Fighting Championships, he began to be involved in organized crime in 2003, when he was involved in a $20,000,000 narcotics bust, tho he would be found not guilty. Michael Xanthoudakis was a Rock Machine Nomad, who later joined the Sydney chapter. He had been one of two Australian Rock Machine members to be arrested in Manitoba, Canada during September 2008, they were there upon request from the International chapter based in Ontario to help establish the Winnipeg Rock Machine. Xanthoudakis was also a partner in the Western Australia-based "Ultimate Martial Arts Expo Pty Ltd".

Australian authorities knew of this gathering, as they had questioned several members of the Rock Machine at the Perth Airport the day prior. They had been told by members of the club that they intended on having a party, authorities also believe that members from Canada would be attending. Kim Papalia, who was in charge of the gang crime squad made comments about the club. He stated that the Rock Machine had been recruiting members that had issues with other clubs and that these moves were, "Likely to increase tensions in the outlaw motorcycle club community, they recruit those who bear a grudge against the established gangs." Murray Fraser was the owner of the property the Rock Machine rented as their gym. He said there had been no incidents since they arrived. "I've met them and they're nice people. All I know is it's a good thing because it's going to stop any vandalism and crime."

The club received negative publicity when an associate Stefan Pahia Schmidt was charged with murder after throwing a pub patron through a window with a seven-metre fall (two stories). It is alleged that Schmidt was present with other Rock Machine members when the victim spoke with two women from the Rock Machine group.

On April 9, 2011, after engaging in a verbal altercation, both members of both the Rebels and Rock Machine were given "move on notices" by police. Both groups had been attending a Supafest concert which was hosted at Joondalup Arena.

In September 2011, two members of the Rock Machine Perth chapter were arrested and charged with extortion and demanding property with oral threats. This included full-patch member's; Kyle Barry and Brent Reker, who was the acting "Sargent at Arms" for the Perth chapter. They had been taken into custody by police after they threatened a group of young men who were falsely claiming their association to the Rock Machine. In August 2010, Andrew Clark and Luke Santich, had been told to arrive at the Lost City tattoo parlour in Spearwood. There they were met by four Rock Machine members. They were given an option to either assault their friend, Adrian Seclier, the one responsible for the rumours being spread or pay $2,000 to the bikers. The police were instead informed, as a result, Barry and Reker were given 2 years and 3 years in prison respectfully.

In February 2012, the Rock Machine opened their second chapter in Perth. The South Side Perth or City Crew Perth chapter. This occurred after several members of the Finks Motorcycle Club defected to the Rock Machine Motorcycle Club in January 2012. This bolstered their strength in Western Australia, where they were currently at conflict with the Rebels. The Finks were also longtime rivals with the Rebels Motorcycle Club, and had a shared animosity with the Rock Machine. The Rock Machine would have its numbers boosted further by a "mass defection" of more members from the Finks MC in East Australia. This was due to the fact that the Gold Coast chapters of the Finks Motorcycle Club had been given the status of a criminal organisation by authorities in Queensland. With the Finks members choosing to patch-over to the Rock Machine instead of dealing with the increased police pressure. Large numbers of Finks had initially planned to join the United States-based Mongols Motorcycle Club, But the members that disagreed with this chose the Canadian-based club instead.

In March 2012, the probationary Rock Machine South Perth chapter was subject to a raid by police. Their clubhouse in O'Connor, Australia was searched and three firearms were found, including a sawed-off 12-gauge shotgun. No charges were laid.

In April 2012, Benjamin Sipkes was revealed by authorities to be the full-patch member of the Rock Machine MC that was responsible for the attempted assassination of Nick Martin, the Rebels MC West Australia president. Sipkes was acquitted by the jury of attempted murder charges, but did receive lesser charges of "unlawful wounding with intent to cause grievous bodily harm". He would be sentenced to 6 years in prison.

Also in 2012, members of a Rock Machine chapter in New South Wales had reported links to Serbian organized crime group and used that influence to patch over members of the Comanchero Motorcycle Club in early 2012, causing tension with existing Sydney Comancheros. One of those Rock Machine members to patch over, Faalau Pisu, was shot dead at a wedding in south-west Sydney on November 5. Two days later, the Rock Machine Sydney chapter retaliated against the Comancheros for the murder of Pisu. Comancheros member, John Devine, was shot six times at a construction site in Rhodes. Devine was the cousin of Comancheros leader, Mark Buddle. Australian authorities also reported tensions between the Rock Machine chapter in Maroubra and the Comancheros in Milperra. The situation would resolve itself, with Mark bubble, being forced to flee Australia due to a litany of charges against him for unrelated matters.

In 2013, the Rock Machine had begun to expand into Victoria, Australia. They established the Melbourne chapter in the south Melbourne suburb of Dandenong, a territory also controlled by the Bandidos. They also would eventually established the Badlands chapter in South Clayton. The Rock Machine had also begun to purchase local businesses to expand their influence. They operated the Fitzroy bar and had applied for several other business permits in Victoria that were being blocked by authorities. The Rock Machine's expansion brought them into conflict with their arch rivals, the Hells Angels. Properties belonging to the Rock Machine, including the clubhouse in South Clayton were subject to a drive-by shooting in late 2013. Hells Angels and Comancheros had also had their properties attacked by then unknown parties. Authorities arrested individuals linked to the Hells Angels in the shootings against RM properties. The Hells Angels were reported to have been traveling to bars in regional Victoria looking for Rock Machine members. The Rock Machine had its main powerbase localed in Perth. They had established their main Perth chapter in 2009. In early 2012, a second chapter was established, composed mostly of former Finks. It had now passed its probationary period. However, on October 1, 2013, the main Perth chapter was frozen due to its members joining the Bandidos. Regardless they were still described by media as being strong in Perth, despite the recent setbacks in Western Australia.

In October 2017, Australian authorities arrested two full-patch members of the Rock Machine's Rock City chapter (West Sydney chapter) located in New South Wales. One member, Adam Bourke was a Mixed Martial Arts champion, and former member of the Australian Military. He along with another member, Adam Haffenden, were detained and charged. Sydney Police charged him for attempting to cut another man's ear off due to an outstanding debt of $11,000. A third man, Jeffrey Hall, an associate of the Rock Machine was also arrested.

Police stated that Bourke and Haffenden had approached the victim, demanding he pay the money that he owed them, they then threatened to cut his ear off if he did not pay them and caused injury to the side of his head above his ear with a knife. Court documents revealed by Australian media stated the charges that they were to receive "Mr. Bourke and Adam Haffenden have both been charged with wounding a person with intent to cause grievous bodily harm, demand property with menaces with intent to steal, and knowingly participate in criminal group to assist crime while using their position in the Rock Machine outlaw motorcycle gang to intimidate." Jeffrey Hall, the Rock Machine associate and neighbor to Bourke was charged with demanding money with menace and participating in activities of the known criminal group. (Rock Machine is a criminal organization under Australian laws) During 2018, Australian Police reported that the Rock Machine Australia Nomads chapter had begun to operate in South Australia, an area of the country that the Rock Machine's expansion has frequently mentioned by media.

By 2016, the Rock Machine had mostly being flying under the radar in Western Australia, this was due to the main Perth chapter had been frozen after some of its members joined the Bandidos, and to police pressure. The Perth South chapter (City Crew Perth) had remained active giving them just one chapter in the region. In 2017, the Rock Machine would reestablish its main Perth chapter, Rock Machine Nomads had been sighted in Perth just months prior. In January 2018, it was made public by authorities that the Rock Machine were active in the area again. In the same month a member of the Rock Machine's Perth chapter was arrested for a domestic incident. Following this the Rock Machine dramatically expanded in Western Australia, they established further chapters in Midland, Mandurah and Karratha, bringing their total to 5 in Western Australia. By 2021, The main Perth chapter is said to have 25 full-patch members.

In March 2019, up to 4 members of the Rock Machine Adelaide chapter were charged for a series of shootings that happened in the Ferryden Park area from February until March 2019. A home on Constable Street had targeted three times. Of those arrested included two veteran members of the Rock Machine Australia. In July 2019, was recorded by authorities that a large group of members from the Rock Machine Motorcycle Club had been seen traveling in Melbourne. The group had also increased its activity in Southern Australia during 2018.

A second chapter was also formed in South-East Australia and another in North-East Australia giving the Rock Machine its ninth and tenth chapters in the country. On August 30, 2019, Australian authorities from the SOCB (Serious and Organised Crime Branch) launched raids against two locations belonging to the Rock Machine's Adelaide chapter. This saw the arrests of two full-patch members of the Rock Machine MC, this included the secretary and acting president of the Adelaide chapter, Alexander Michael Ilich. The Police also seized 1.75 kilograms of methamphetamine (worth over $500,000) and a semi-automatic 9mm pistol of Austrian manufacture (Glock). Both members received charges for narcotics trafficking, firearms offenses and money laundering . In September 2020, Authorities gained a "restraining order over Ilich's cash and two Mercedes-Benz vehicles – one of which has been found since the order was granted", this occurred after he was caught discussing the matter with his girlfriend in an intercepted prison telephone call. On December 23, 2020. Rock Machine president, Alexander Michael Ilich was sentenced to 12 years in prison for the sale of narcotics.

In February 2022, a member of the Rock Machine was arrested and charged with possession of narcotics and trafficking, Australian authorities seized $64,000 in methamphetamine.

=== Rock Machine-Mongols conflict ===
In early 2021, tensions between the Rock Machine Motorcycle Club and Mongols Motorcycle Club reached a boiling point. On March 10, 2021. Nine members of the Rock Machine arrived at the residence of Mongols member, Steven Bennie. The Rock Machine members would fire their guns into the building and cars. Bennie's pregnant girlfriend and their 5-year-old daughter had been present at the time, no one was killed. Authorities say serious damage was caused to the property and two vehicles parked in the driveway. These events would cause the Rebels Bibra Lake clubhouse to be raided by police. Bennie had formerly been a member of the Rebels MC, police initially suspected that this was some form of retaliation for switching to the Mongols.

Australian authorities would have a better idea of what happened in the coming days. On March 16, 2021. Clint Moller, a prospect of the Rock Machine's Perth South chapter was arrested and charged for the drive-by shooting of the Port Kennedy house. Shortly after a second member of the Rock Machine was arrested in connection with the shooting. Trevor Fletcher, a senior member of the Rock Machine's Perth chapter and was arrested after evading police three times on his motorcycle. He faced charges of committing an "unlawful act or omission with intent to harm, criminal damage and possessing a firearm or ammunition without a licence." He was charged with had also been charged with possessing 24 grams of methamphetamine with the intent to sell and $2000 cash which authorities argue was "stolen or unlawfully obtained".

Tensions between the clubs at this point escalated into open conflict, in May the Mongols would put out a sizeable contract on one of the members of the Rock Machine involved in the drive-by shooting of the Mongol residents. He had just recently applied for bail. Over the next couple months authorities would arrest eleven more members of the Rock Machine. One from their Perth chapter and 10 from the South Perth chapter. In total arresting 10 of the South Perth chapters 23 members, accusing them of being involved in the incident and planning a second attack. Many have since been released.

On August 6, 2022, Trevor Fletcher, of the Rock Machine Perth chapter was again arrested and detained by WA police. This time due to a series of fire bombing attacks in connection with the Rock Machine's ongoing disputes with the Mongols and other competing clubs. Fletcher, who had been on bail at the time, participated in a string of arson attacks in Perth's south and east end. This included a carport, where three vehicles were set ablaze.

== France ==
In 2016, The Rock Machine Motorcycle Club patched-over two chapters of the Satudarah Motorcycle Club in France. These would become the Rock Machine's Paris chapter located North of the city and Milita Nomads France chapter in the Metz area. Men from these chapters traveled to Ulm, Germany in June 2016, to meet with the Nomads Germany chapter.

== Germany ==
The Rock Machine arrived in Germany during October 2009 with its Nomads, multiple local German motorcycle clubs agreed to become probationary chapters of the Rock Machine Motorcycle Club. By 2010, 60-plus members had been patched-over to create four new chapters in the country (Nomads Germany North, Nomads Germany South, Nomads Germany East and Nomads Germany West). From there, the club began to expand in Germany. The individual responsible for bringing the Rock Machine to Germany was Bernhard Denziger (Südbaden), and for this he was gifted the "Founding Father patch" by members in Canada. An achievement that his rival, Suat Erköse, claims for himself despite not joining the club until 2011. As of 2020, membership in Germany is estimated to be over 200 total between the two factions. When the Rock Machine arrived in Europe, it established alliances with other powerful motorcycle clubs. The Rock Machine Germany established a friendship with the Gremium Motorcycle Club, one of Germany's largest motorcycle clubs. They were often honoured guests at the Gremium's Lakeside and Mosbach chapters. The Rock Machine also established an alliance with the Mongols Motorcycle Club in Germany and Sweden. (Relations might be affected by the conflict in Australia) European leadership also established strong ties with the Satudarah Motorcycle Club in the Netherlands. Eventually the Rock Machine Germany would recruit the Ghost Gang Motorcycle Club located in Wuppertal to act as a support club.

- Rock Machine-Bandidos conflict in Germany

In Spring 2011, ex-Bandido, Suat Erköse applied to join the Rock Machine. By this time the Rock Machine was expanding further into the South German province of Baden-Württemberg. It had established two chapters in Ulm and Neu-Ulm. Issues between the Rock Machine and the Bandidos Germany erupted in the Ulm area were both clubs had chapters. In early May, members of the Rock Machine's Neu-Ulm chapter were involved in a violent altercation with Bandidos Ulm chapter members at a bar in Neu-Ulm, several people were injured. Tensions had been growing between the groups over the control of the lucrative red light district in Ulm. On May 10, 2011, several members of the Rock Machine Ulm (Germany Central) chapter traveled to a Bandidos associated Pure Platinum nightclub on Blaubeurer Straße. They entered the business and brazenly assaulted a few members of the Bandidos Ulmer chapter, several Bandidos were injured.

The Bandidos, feeling their reputation was at stake responded with an attack on a residence associated with the Rock Machine, located in the Wiblingen district of Ulm. Four Bandidos members vandalized a vehicle with a baseball bat and fired multiple shots into the building, no one was injured though the members girlfriend was home. Two Bandidos were arrested and charged for the shooting. The regional court accused one Bandidos Germany national secretary, Andreas B. of attempted murder for ordering the attack. Another member Mahir H. was charged as an accomplice. The Rock Machine then retaliated by fire bombing a Bandidos-owned business in early 2012, this in turn resulted in one of their establishments being set ablaze a week later. A series of raids launched by German police against several chapters of the Bandidos led to a de-escalation in tensions.

On December 16, 2012, a shootout occurred in the industrial sector of Ulm. Three Full-Patch members of the Rock Machine, consisting of Bestrim B, Blerim B. and Asmon G., met with Murat C. and two other men from the red light district and private security industry for a "debate" – due to a bomb threat against a business. All three men were associated with the Bandidos. A physical altercation occurred, then Rock Machine member, Asmon, drew his pistol and fired multiple shots. A 31-year-old security contractor, Eduard W., was fatally shot and a 41-year-old man, Alex S., who worked in the brothel scene was seriously injured. All three members of the Rock Machine MC were arrested. Eduard W was a former member of the Bandidos, he had also been working as of security at the place where the altercation occurred between the two clubs on May 10, 2011. All three Rock Machine members initially faced murder charges, Asmon G. was sentenced to 12 years in prison. Due to insufficient evidence, one of the two brother was acquitted, the other B. Brother received a year in prison for "attempted evasion". Once he was released, the B. Brothers were disillusioned with the split in the Rock Machine due to Suat Erköse. They planned to separate with their supporters.

=== Division of Rock Machine MC Germany ===
In 2013, Suat Erköse had claimed the title, President of Europe, causing controversy in with chapters in Europe. This was done without an official election or the permission from the Canadian Mother chapter. The B. Brothers and the Dardania chapter were very influential within the club and planned to have those who did not support Erköse join them. The Blue Rockmachine was initially just called the Rock Machine Dardania chapter, but later decided to rebrand to completely disassociate with Erköse. The B. Brothers were of Kosovian heritage, so the Blue Rockmachine began to recruit bikers and criminals with Balkan backgrounds. The Blue Rockmachine also formed an alliance with the Bandidos, which was currently at conflict with the Rock Machine Germany. Following these events, the two groups began to insult each other in interviews and over the internet. Suat's faction released a statement denouncing the Blue RM as "fakes" and "traitor's", while the Blue Rockmachine insults its former boss Suat E. as a "police friend", "coward" and "wannabe".

Suats faction spoke with BN news:

Of course the internet lies. The Digge was with Michel in our South West Chapter. Both were members and had decided to open their own and another chapter in the southwest called Southend. We want to grow, and because the two of them had enough good people for a new chapter, I, as President of Europe, approved their plans. The chapter president from there, however, took a stand. I then had an intense conversation with him, but he was unapologetic and we kicked him out of the Rock Machine MC. There is simply a need for clarification, as the story with the homepage shows. Another reason is that someone we threw out of the club wants to do his own thing under the name "Rock Machine" by falsifying our logo: He simply turned the red eye in the eagle into a blue one. Something like that doesn't work and is pure provocation. People call me and ask: Who is the right Rock Machine MC? Again I can say: I represent the club in Germany and our logo remains as it was in the original. That they "copy, imitate, falsify the club emblem – we do not tolerate any of this.

The Blue Rock Machine retaliated with this statement to journalists:

Suat Erköse is by no means the founder of the Rockmachine MC in Europe.! When we drove under RM Farben in southern Baden, this Erköse Suat didn't even know the Rockmachine MC! In 2011, Erköse applied for admission to the RM MC, but unfortunately, this application was approved. Now Erköse was a member of the RM MC. Erköse had kept quiet about the fact that he is an ex-police officer and is also in bad standing at the Bandidos MC. When the Rockmachine MC was attacked by another MC, Erköse searched the distance and fearfully hid in his apartment. Erköse had this Seek and Destroy Patch (award for bravery) made by himself, without the club's knowledge. As a coward that he is, he would never have received this patch from the club. Erköse sees the MC as a source of income and has always used the club's treasury to improve his miserable Hartz 4 life. You also do not see this Internet "rocker" on the street, this is not surprising as he does not have a valid driver's license. His alleged chapters abroad are also a fake. These "tough 1% men" around this Suat were asked to hand over an RM T shirt, whereupon this Suat Erköse group filed criminal charges with the police for theft of a T shirt.

During 2013, Canadian authorities launched several raids against the Rock Machine Motorcycle Club club in Manitoba and Quebec. This caused temporary leadership issues as it led to the arrest of the international president, Joseph "Critical J" Strachan and several other high-ranking Rock Machine members in Canada. Strachan's successor, "Rude Boy" of Ontario was elected to be the new international Nomads president.

In February 2014, Erköse attempted to claim a title of international president of the Rock Machine. For months he had been working with Canadian Jean-François Emard, to undermine the leadership of international President, "Rude Boy". Emard, who was a member of the Toronto chapter at the time, chose side with Erköse for personal gain. Emard and Erköse then began to use the internet to spread rumors and slandered Rude Boy and former club leader Critical J. Emard was attempting to convince members to cast a vote of no confidence against Rude Boy, Critical J and several other prominent members on behalf of Erköse, but apparently no vote occurred and they were removed by Erköse anyway. None of the Ontario members agreed to this, as they would be removed by the Erköse faction. On February 14, 2014, A Facebook post from Erköse's Rock Machine stated, that all Rock Machine chapters in Ontario had been frozen and that leaders Rude Boy, Stephan Martin and Ron Concho were placed "out in bad standing". With Rude Boy and other high-ranking members either in jail or out of the club because of Emard's actions, Suat Erköse was able to claim the title of International president. For his efforts Jean-François Emard was given the rank of world vice president in the "World Chapter" and was also made the leader of Erköse's faction in Canada until 2018, with his chapters either dissolving or rejoined the official Rock Machine.

By early 2014, the Ulm (Germany Central), Southgang and Neu-Ulm chapters joined the Blue Rockmachine. It was decided that the club would move forward under the leadership of Bernhard Südbaden, with his chapter becoming the new Blue Rockmachine Nomads.

In February 2014, as Erköse attempted to claim a title of international president of the Rock Machine. Through manipulation, he had managed to momentarily sideline the Canadian leadership. The Rock Machine MC Germany Mother chapter under Bernhard Südbaden, was located in Southern Baden at the time. They watched these events unfold and posted on the club's website. "www.rockmachinemcgermany.de". They released a statement saying that Erköse, Michal and Digge had been removed the group in bad standing because of "behavior that was harmful to the club", which Suat would later make a response statement on an interview with BN. He had formed his own chapter called WolfSSChanze chapter (later known as World Chapter), which was followed by the newly formed Southend chapter under Digge and Michel. The Rock Machine's Southwest chapter had disagreed with the creation of the Southend chapter in the first place and considered it insubordinate, so Erköse claimed they were out of the club.

In early 2014, before the Rock Machine's Germany's 2014 "Euro Run" in July. For to not falling in line with Erköse's coup, the Badlands, Darkside, Midland and Southwest chapters had all members placed in "bad standing" by Erköse. But most Rock Machine members didn't accept this ultimatum and continued to operate the club in Germany with blessing and guidance and from the Mother chapter in Canada. Stating that they were not kicked out, but had refused to follow Suat. "They resigned themselves, shortly before the last Euro Run. And they still wear their [Rock Machine] colors. Now they have elected a new National President and met with the Blue Rockmachine. Both groups still want to remain independent, but have officially made peace." A later interview by German media with Bernhard Südbaden of the Blue Rockmachine and "Mike", the new National President of the official Rock Machine Germany cleared up the situation.

In November 2014, over 150 members of the United Tribuns met in Stuttgart and Ludwigsburg to discuss the ongoing conflicts with its rivals. In January 2015, around 20 representatives from the Bandidos, the Black Jackets, the Blue Rockmachine and the Broncos MC met at a club in West Ulm. The purpose of their meeting was intimidate the United Tribuns with the alliance against them. Police stormed in fearing a situation and arrested everyone, including the United Tribuns who had been invited. United Tribuns spokesman Fritz L. Stated: "We happened to be there and complied with the police request."

In February 2015, the newly elected president of the official Rock Machine in Germany, met with Bernhard Südbaden and other high-ranking members of the Blue Rockmachine. They decided to remain separate entities regardless of their combined distaste for the Erköse faction. However the two groups did all but unify and made peace with one another.

=== Rock Machine Germany civil conflict ===
In 2015, violence would erupt between the Erköse faction and the Blue Rockmachine. In March 2015, a brawl occurred between the two groups and multiple people were injured. In April 2015, the Lolita Club, a brothel belonging to the Blue Rockmachine was shot at. The Blue Rockmachine retaliated by burning down a car dealership and bar belonging to the Erköse Faction. A few days later, a business associated with the United Tribuns was also bombed. In June 2015, a bomb was detonated outside of a marijuana paraphernalia shop that was owned by the Blue Rockmachine.

The Rock Machine faction under Erköse had aligned themselves with the a gang called the United Tribuns, causing one of their businesses to be destroyed by the Rock Machine Blue in April 2015. The Tribuns began to assist their new allies by bombing a bar on Kornhausplatz that was owned by the Blue Rockmachine in late June 2015. Then a brothel owned by the Blue Rockmachine had three bullets shot at it. No one was injured in either attack. The damage for both incidents totalled several thousand euros. On August 5, 2015, the official Rock Machine Germany held a club event in the city of Ulm. The club had attempted to meet near their stronghold, but the meeting was banned by local authorities in Sigmaringen. In 2014, world-wide membership of the Rock Machine Motorcycle Club reached over 800 members. Around 150 members of the Rock Machine Motorcycle Club from chapters all over Germany, as well as chapters from neighboring Belgium were present. The local authorities feared the worst and had dozens of heavily armed police officers ready to intervene if there were any issues. This was due to the ongoing conflict for the Red light district and the internal dispute in the club, which had seen violence in the previous months.

In early 2016, the vice president of the Ulm chapter of the United Tribuns, along with his brother were shot. His brother survived but was sent to hospital in critical condition, but the vice president died of his injuries. Police say they arrested a member of the Black Jackets gang for the shooting, the 27 year-old was supposedly hired by the Blue Rockmachine.

The Erköse faction formed its own Badlands chapter after the Rock Machine Germany merged theirs with Darkside. This gave them four chapters in Germany. The WolfSSChanze chapter, the Battlefield chapter located in Ulm, the new Badlands chapter in Southern Germany and Militia chapter.

== Indonesia ==
In October 2014, it was announced by Europol that several outlaw motorcycle clubs had made their way into Asia. This included the Rock Machine Motorcycle Club, which over the years has established chapters in Bali, Indonesia, the Philippines, Thailand, Vietnam and New Caledonia. The intelligence analysis report by Europol stated: "These gangs, already notorious in Canada, the US and Europe are expanding into Asia and the Pacific to augment their power and global grasp on drug supply, in particular methamphetamines, amphetamines and drugs traditionally trafficked in South-East Asia". They also commented about what they believe they're goal is by expanding into this area, "The desire to increase their role in particular criminal markets by opening chapters in strategic locations, for instance along the trafficking routes for drugs, weapons and human beings". The Philippines media seemed to take the Rock Machine as a threat, they were describe as "ranked by Police sources as second only to Hells Angels in Quebec". Europol also warned that conflict was most likely imminent, with the area so populated with other gangs and outlaw motorcycle clubs moving in. The Rock Machine Thailand was started and operated by a former member of the Nomads Canada chapter, known as "Snake", who now acts a president of Rock Thailand. He was described as, "Snake is a member of RMMC, who has had sex with over a 1000 s***s and prostitutes. Snake has been active in the MC community in Thailand, Peru and of course his homeland of Canada."

The Rock Machine had arrived in Indonesia during 2010. They established the Bali chapter and soon after the Bali Nomads chapter. The chapter was made up of Canadians, Australians and Germans that lived in the country. They were joined by several Indonesians. In March 2016, the Rock Machine established a third chapter in Jakarta, the members of the Jakarta chapter was made up of local Germans, Belgians and Indonesians. In February 2017, the Rock Machine Canada elected the Nomads Thailand chapter to be the new mother chapter of Aisa. In 2020, the club expanded into other Asian and middle eastern countries. This included establishment of a chapters in Hong Kong and Kuwait. In August 2020, members of the new Hong Kong chapter, along with members of the Rock Machine Nomads met with the Pagans East Coast chapter in Hong Kong. In December 2020, several chapters of the Rock Machine USA traveled to Hong Kong to be involved in a charity event set up by the Hong Kong Rock Machine. The Kuwait Nomads chapter was established in mid 2020, and its ranks are said to be composed of former members of the United States Army and Special Forces.

== Luxembourg ==
On July 14, 1997, the president of the Rock Machine Quebec City chapter, Frédéric Faucher, along with national secretary, Johnny Plescio and Paul Porter, who was at the time president of the club in Quebec, attended a motorcycle show in Luxembourg. There, the Rock Machine was seen by authorities meeting with high-ranking members of the Bandidos Europe. This was done to discuss patching over to the Bandidos in an attempt to "internationalize" the Quebec Biker War.

== Mexico ==
On January 1, 1995, Normand Baker, a Rock Machine member was murdered while drinking in a Hard Rock Cafe in Acapulco, Mexico by the Hells Angel Françoise Hinse during the Quebec Biker War. Baker had been one of the killers of Pierre Daoust a member of a Hells Angels support club.

== New Zealand ==
In August 2013, the New Zealand media released articles stating that the notorious Rock Machine Motorcycle Club had established a chapter in the country. Authorities commented that they had not seen anyone wearing Rock Machine colors yet, but they had seen pictures posted on social media. They did state that they believed the group had a long way to go before they established a significant operation in New Zealand. The police sent out a public appeal or information about the newly established outlaw motorcycle club. The new probationary chapter was established in Christchurch by president "Mike Rock", he post to his social media, "After months of hard work and perseverance, RMMC is now officially rocking it loud and proud in New Zealand." An unnamed member of the Rock Machine Christchurch chapter later agreed to give an interview to the New Zealand National.

It was a revealed during the interview, that the Rock Machine New Zealand was small initially, but had been reinforced by a gang from North Island in a patch over ceremony. The member declined to comments on how large the Rock Machine's presence was in New Zealand, but he did state that "it was more than police believed, some [members] had links to chapters of the club overseas [Nomads]." He also stated that most members were working citizen's and had family's. A suitable clubhouse was also being found, but he would not state where it was located. When asked about the difficulty of establishing presence in the new country he said, "Starting a motorcycle club from scratch is not easy work especially if it's an international charter. You have got to be trusted."

The member assured that the public should not fear their presence. Stating that the club was not currently involved in the drug trade in New Zealand, "As a club as a whole we don't want nothing to do with P [methamphetamine]. It's just disgusting shit." And that the Rock Machine would "Only turn to violence if challenged. We are just Harley [Davidson] enthusiasts." Their presence did make authorities fear clashes, as now the Rock Machine, Bandidos, Rebels and Head Hunters all had chapters located in the same city. In January 2014, it was announced that the Bandidos had patched over at least two members of the Rock Machine as probationary's. The Christchurch chapter seemed to have recovered, as in 2016, the Rock Machine announced via their website, that they had established a second chapter in the country, the Nomads New Zealand chapter.

== Poland ==
In 2012, a member of the Rock Machine Nomads Germany chapter was arrested by Polish Police for the possession of illegally made driver's license. The member in question had supposedly lost his license in 2002. He had been driving using an illegally acquired license from Poland, he had paid 1,800 euros for it. The Rock Machine Motorcycle Club ran businesses in Poland, this included an escort recruitment agency in the capital Warsaw. It recruited strippers and escorts to work at bars and stripclubs owned by the Rock Machine in Europe.

== Norway ==
The Rock Machine arrived in Norway during 2013, they established a probationary chapter in Stavanger. By 2014, the Stavanger chapter had become a full chapter and the club began to expand. In April 2016, the Rock Machine held an international meeting in Norway. Norwegian authorities denied the entry of the International president of the Rock Machine into the country. This was due to his extensive criminal record. He was imprisoned, then deported three days later. However several Canadians, Australians, Germans, Russians and Swedes were allowed to enter Norway for the meeting. In mid 2016, the Erköse faction opened their Eastside chapter in Norway. It was made up of veteran members of the Outlaws and Gladiators Motorcycle Clubs. With the youngest member being 50 years old, they were described as "They're all wild Vikings with long beards."

In October 2017, raids conducted by Norwegian Police in Romerike, resulted in the arrest of several Full-Patch members of The Rock Machine MC Norway on charges of distribution of narcotics and firearms, illegal possession of firearms and murder, for killing Farzad "Backflip" Pazooki, a prospective member of the Bandidos Motorcycle Club Norway. He had made comments on the Rock Machine's Norwegian Facebook page that led to his death. The clubs had been in open conflict with each other since 2011, but have despised each other since the 2007 split in Canada. They seized over 30 kilos of hash. 10 kilos of various other narcotics and several firearms.

The Bandidos prospect had formally been a member of the Rock Machine, however he was removed from the club. He had only managed to earn the status of a hangaround for 3 weeks before being removed in bad standing. On January 22, 2017, the 31 year-old was found dead at his residence in Blakstad, Asker, Norway. In February 2017, Norwegian Police arrested and charged 5 members of the Rock Machine Klubben chapter. They also detained two other members, one from the Oslo chapter and one from the a continental Nomads chapter. This included Terje Østby, the president of Rock Machine's European Nomads chapter. Two of the Klubben chapters members were also charged for the murder of the Bandidos prospect, both entered a not guilty plea. The court examined the victim's phone and on it, they saw several threatening messages and pictures sent from the deceased to one of the members of the Rock Machine. He had sent them a picture of a stun grenade. He also made threats over message, threatening to force himself on one of the Rock Machine's member's daughters, stating he would film it, he threatened to blow up one of the members cars and the Rock Machine chapters clubhouse.

The court mentioned that before his death, he had joined one of the Rock Machine's rivals, the Bandidos. It was also stated that on the night he was murdered, he commented on his Facebook page "F**king Rock Machine whores!! Or should we say c*ck machine,". Just recently the victim joined the Bandidos as a prospect, this along with the other incidents caused the Rock Machine Norway to react. According to a witness only identifying themselves as VG. The two RM are said to have approached the man's house, a heated argument escalated into an altercation. The victim was apparently bludgeoned to death by one of the members with a dumbbell. VG crossed paths with one of the accused outside of a police station while on his way to give a statement. He was later seen with a bruised and lacerated face.

After less the three weeks of being a hangaround for the Rock Machine, they learned that he was a hardcore drug addict. The Rock machine has a policy against "dependency" on hard drugs. So he was booted out, but he was infuriated with the club's choice, and sent many threats to members. TBM Scandinavia's spokesman Michael Green was given an access to some of the Rock Machine rules, when joining the club all members must sign a contract. One of the rules forbids drug addicts and can be cause for immediate ejection. The spokesperson also stated, "In the contract you sign, you also sign that you must pay the club a "withdrawal fee" of DKK 20,000 whether you leave the club voluntarily or are excluded – a contract the 31-year-old victim had also signed on November 25, 2016. When he started in Rock Machine MC Norway, but which he had already defaulted on December 4, 2016, when he was excluded from Rock Machine MC Norway."

Both of the accused Rock Machine members were held for 4 weeks. During the month long period they were banned from visitation, media and contact with the outside. During the trial the court was nervous about the length the club would go to to protect its members stating, "The Oslo District Court believes there is a risk that evidence may disappear or be destroyed if the two are allowed to have contact with others."

On August 5, 2018, The President of the No Surrender MC chapter in Jessheim, Norway was assaulted by several members of the Rock Machine at a local business. Later that day it was announced by Norwegian media that a massive brawl had occurred between members of the Rock Machine and the No Surrender Motorcycle Club, some members of the Rock Machine had Patched-over to the No Surrender after the police raid in 2017, causing tensions. The brawl resulted in several injuries on both sides.

== Sweden ==
In June 1997, three leaders of the Rock Machine, Frédéric Faucher, Johnny Plescio, and Robert "Tout Tout" Léger, went to Stockholm, Sweden to seek audience with the Swedish branch of the Bandidos Motorcycle Club, who had impressed them with their war against the Hells Angels in Scandinavia. But before the meeting could take place, the Rock Machine members were arrested and expelled by Swedish authorities, who declared that they "did not want Canadian bikers in their country". Faucher had gained wide fame in underworld circles by blowing up the Hells Angels Quebec City chapter clubhouse during February 1997. After the Rock Machine's acting president, Claude Vézina was arrested for drug smuggling, he became the Rock Machine's new national president on September 11, 1997. The Rock Machine planned to have the club absorbed into the Bandidos, the second-largest outlaw biker club in the world in a bid to "internationalize" the conflict.

The Rock Machine Motorcycle Club official arrived in Sweden in 2010, with its Nomads. By this time the Rock Machine had chapters in Canada, Australia, USA, Germany, Kosovo, France, Hungary, Norway, Romania, Indonesia, South Africa and Switzerland. The club quickly grew in influence and by 2012, they had 5 chapters in Sweden, it had also begun stepping on the toes of other clubs in the area. A Rock Machine support club, the Platinum Motorcycle Club or Platinum Crew was established. It had chapters created in Kalmar, Karlskrona and Kristianstad. The chapters were formed from local motorcycle clubs and members of a gang called the Syndicate Legion. It would later be joined by three chapters of the Vendettas Motorcycle Club, which is the International support club of the Rock Machine. The club also made an alliance with the Mongols Motorcycle Club in Sweden, however conflict between the Rock Machine and Mongols in Australia may have soured relations.

On March 17, 2012, an associate of the Rock Machine Sweden was shot in Kungsmarken. A man with associations to the Outlaws was arrested in Lindås in connection with the murder. A 24-year-old relative of the man was also shot and killed soon after in Bergamålathe. This attack by their ally confused the Rock Machine and forced them to retaliate, they killed a member of the Outlaws in Dalarna. Soon after, a truck driver with associations to the club was murdered near Hallandsåsen. Later on in 2012, the president of the Outlaws Motorcycle Club's Ronneby chapter, was shot and killed in Bergamålathe. Swedish authorities announced that the Rock Machine had been involved in at least one of the murders and they believed a territorial feud was underway between the Rock Machine and Outlaws. This did come as a shock though, as the Outlaws and Rock Machine had historically been allies and at the time maintained good relations in Canada and several other countries.

Over 100 people, including more than 60 bikers attended the funeral of the high ranking Outlaw. A significant brawl started at the funeral and police had to step in and fire warning shots to stop the violence. Several people were transferred to hospital with injuries. It was reported by media that he was "apparently a victim in a conflict between the motorcycle gangs Rock Machine MC and Outlaws MC regarding control and various types of criminal business." In Spring 2012, a member of the Platinum Crew was shot while walking home from a store in Kristianstad, he was severely injured but survived.

In August 2012, it was later made clear to media and police that the Rock Machine was not in conflict with the Outlaws. The Outlaws associate who had been responsible for the shooting of a Rock Machine associate in Kungsmarken was revealed to have switched sides to the Hells Angels. This caused the Rock Machine accidentally respond. The Outlaws and Rock Machine were currently at conflict with the Hells Angels, the other attacks on both groups were also eventually linked to the Angels. Two men suspected in the murder of the Outlaws president were arrested. One was a known associate of the Hells Angels, according to the district court, he had lured the Outlaw into a forest under the pretext of a drug deal and then killed him. Despite the efforts of his defense, Björn Lindmare, he received 18 years in prison, while the man driving of the getaway vehicle received 10 years in prison for abetting.

Chief prosecutor Pernilla Åström claimed that there were contradictions between the Outlaws, where the 49-year-old had the title "president", and the three defendants, all with connections to the Hells Angels. She also referred to text messages between the 49-year-old and one of the defendants. According to it, they should actually have met the day before the murder, but the meeting was cancelled. It was all about a drug deal. The next day, however, the 49-year-old was lured late in the evening to the lonely forest road where he was shot. In a police interrogation, a 27-year-old accused, who posed as a driver, told about what happened at the murder scene. He has also said that all three met before the crime and then received different information on the night of the murder.

A police canine sniffed out three of the bullet casings in a place that the 27-year-olddriver" had pointed out. In the same way, the murder weapon was found in Bräkneån by divers from the Coast Guard. According to the investigation, the used who according to the indictment fired the fatal shots, was on several websites and, among other things, checked the victim's car number as early as December 2011. The prosecutor claimed the 26-year-old hoped to rise in the ranks within the Hells Angels after he shot the 49-year-old. The wiretapping has shown that.

It is no secret that it is the Hells Angels with their supporter groups that attack the Outlaws. An important part of this "warfare" is to show strength. The clearest demonstration of power came in connection with the burial of the murdered Outlaws leader in Blekinge. There were more of us on site than they themselves were, says a person in the Hells Angels environment.

About 80 people came to the funeral. At the same time, in a nearby square, 100 men gathered who, at a given signal, took off their jackets and exposed their vests with badges showing that they belonged to the Hells Angels and the Red & White Crew. To people outside these circles, it is outlandish, almost ridiculous behavior. But in the biker environment it was a clear demonstration of strength. I think they succeeded in their intention to show who is the biggest, said police superintendent Jan Hansson in Blekinge in a comment after the incident. The high-profile attack against Svineri MC outside Kalmar is also part of the conflict between Hells Angels and Outlaws.

According to information from the biker community, it was a punitive expedition because Outlaws were invited to a party at Svineri MC. However, it is uncertain whether it was the club that invited the Outlaws or whether it was individual members of it who took the initiative. The attack on Svineri MC was also a way to freeze Outlaws out of the biker community, because all clubs in Sweden now know that it is dangerous to hang out with Outlaws. Through the attack on the family party at Svineri MC, the conflict was brought into areas and contexts far beyond the criminal MC environment. Something that is simply too damned.

In 2014 Swedish Police gained a warrant to evict The Rock Machine Klippan chapter from their clubhouse. This was due to five individual members of the club being charged with narcotics crimes over past three years. The eviction occurred peacefully and the chapter relocated to a new clubhouse in the area.

A feud between the Rock Machine Motorcycle Club and the Bandidos Motorcycle Club, had existed since the Shedden massacre and Rock Machine's re-emergence in 2007. A conflict between the Bandidos and the Rock Machine was already occurring in Germany during this time. In Sweden tensions began to rise in 2013, after it was rumored that some of Bandidos members had patched-over to the Rock Machine. Many new members in this area were people who had previously been members or associates of the Bandidos. This included the president of the Rock Machine Sweden, Stefan "Cubba" Kubatov. He had formally been the Swedish president of X-Team, a Bandidos support gang. He would become a full-patch member of the Bandidos, before becoming disillusioned and leaving the club.

In early September 2014, there was an altercation between the Bandidos and a member of a Rock Machine support club, the Platinum Crew. He was alone and was beaten by Bandidos. He was also struck with a hammer and they took his Platinum Crew vest. An enraged Kubatov delivered a message to the Bandidos threatening them with war. The first meeting between Bandidos and Rock Machine occurred shortly after. The Bandidos demanded the Rock Machine surrender their vests, the meeting did not go well and turned hostile in nature. After this Kubatov would send the Rock Machine Sweden's sergeant-at-arms to meet with them again. By this point he no longer wanted to be in the Rock Machine; he had initially been honored by this position. He favored joining the Bandidos, he would be removed by Kubatov shortly after. In some of these talks, he and the Bandidos discussed the option of him joining their club (was recorded on a police bug that had been placed in the Bandidos clubhouse). The Bandidos plan was to attempt to attack the top of Rock Machine Sweden's leadership before they had a chance to start war with them.

In September 2014, the Bandidos attempted to assassinate Kubatov, the Rock Machine Sweden president and head of the Nomads Sweden chapter. On September 20, 2014, several members of the Bandidos approached the Rock Machine Nomads Sweden chapter clubhouse located in Hyllstofta. It was operated out a former pipe manufacturing facility. Kubatov was in the compounds parking lot working on his car which needed repairs. He had asked another member of the Rock Machine if they would come by and bring their tools to help him, in anticipation of this he had left the gate open. Another Rock Machine member was sitting in the clubhouse's TV room, and a third was upstairs sleeping, every other member was at home. A female who was working at one of the Rock Machine's local venues was in the club's hot tub. A silver vehicle eventually pulled into the driveway and two Bandidos exited the car. One was armed with a baton and the other with a pistol. Kubatov, still working on the car and assuming it was his fellow club member, did not see them approaching. They struck him in the back of the head with the baton, this caused him to run because he did not know what was happening. They began to fire at him as he neared the back entrance to the clubhouse. He was shot in the back and leg, the men attempted to follow him into the clubhouse. They threatened the other member from the TV room, who was coming to check on what was going on. A scuffle ensued as they attempted to remove his Rock Machine shirt while Stefan escaped. Missing their chance, the Bandidos decided to flee, taking Kubatov's Rock Machine vest off of his parked motorcycle on their way out. The other member of the Rock Machine who was elsewhere in the clubhouse at the time of the commotion was temporarily arrested for shooting at the vehicle of the retreating Bandidos. The Rock Machine president was treated in the hospital and was initially in serious condition but remained stable. Kubatov was a man who had a reputation as a tough individual. In the 2000s, he was shot in the head and refused to seek medical attention.

This had all been possible due to the Rock Machine's former sergeant-at-arms. But he had been removed from the club after he began to look at it as a burden and continued meeting with the Bandidos. He would provide the Bandidos with information on where the Rock Machine Nomads Sweden clubhouse was located. Also told them that night the clubhouse was to supposed to be empty with the exception of their target. He would go even further, driving the Bandidos members to the location, he then stood outside the clubhouse perimeter and smoked a cigarette while the Bandidos attempted to assassinate his former comrade. For his help with this he asked for membership in the Bandidos Motorcycle Club. He denied this and would later try to claim in court that Bandidos members had kidnapped him and forced him to do this. This was not believed by the jury, he was received charges of "aiding and abetting attempted murder, aiding and abetting aggravated assault and aiding and abetting aggravated weapons offences."

A significant police crackdown against the Bandidos would forcibly de-escalate tensions. In early December 2014, two members of the Bandidos were arrested and charged in connection with the attempted murder. On December 7, 2014, Swedish police arrested three more individuals believed to be involved in the attempted assassination. One of the individuals arrested was detained for "serious weapons offenses and offenses against the Act on Flammable and Explosive Goods." He rented had a warehouse in Hasslarp, where the police raided and seized firearms and explosives. The others, who were detained for attempted murder, were released because the court viewed evidence is too weak. On December 11, 2014, the authorities raided the Bandidos Helsingborg chapter. A separate raid was also launched targeting the clubhouse of the Southern Biker MC, which was a puppet club for the Bandidos. Two more members of the Bandidos were arrested for their part in the attempted murder.

On February 18, 2018, Swedish Police arrested a high-ranking member of the Rock Machine Sweden's Wasteland chapter. He was at a gas station in Klippan when he was detained. Police confiscated an illegal firearm from the member. The member would be charged with weapons offenses under stricter guidelines due to recent updates in weapons legislation in Sweden. The minimal sentence for a weapon related crimes was doubled to 2 years.

== Russia ==
In 2013, the Rock Machine Motorcycle Club established itself in Russia, starting the Nomads Russia chapter. The club formed Moscow chapters for the Rock Machine, along with its international support club, the Vendettas Motorcycle Club. The Moscow chapter had been sponsored by the Rock Machine Germany. By February 2014, the Moscow chapter had passed its probationary period and had 14 full-patch members. The Moscow chapter had been reinforced by the patch-over of a local Russian club called Syndicate MC in January 2014. A second chapter was also formed, the prospective Moscow North chapter had been established in the city of Zelenograd, just 50 kilometers north of Moscow.

In late April 2014, the Rock Machine Russia had its first "National run" in Moscow. Around 35 members of the Rock Machine Russia from its Moscow, Moscow North and Nomads chapters were present for the event. They were joined by the Vendettas MC Russia and dozens Rock Machine from other countries around the world. This included members from Canada, Germany and Australia. The convoy of Rock Machine traveled directly through the center of Moscow, before hosting a party to establish alliances with local bikers. Several hundred guests and members of other clubs attended the event, this included some small clubs but also some of the largest clubs in Russia, such as the Night Wolves.

== United Kingdom ==
In 2013, the National Crime Agency in the United Kingdom were put on alert by Europol that multiple outlaw motorcycle clubs had arrived in Europe, they reported that some had "transported assault rifles and hand grenades" with them, as well as several other motorcycle groups. The arrival of the Rock Machine from Canada. The Loners Motorcycle Club also has chapters there., other clubs include the Comancheros and Rebels from Australia, and the Mongols and Vagos from the United States, has a possibility of causing tensions with established motorcycle gangs. Metropolitan Police and other authorities in the United Kingdom were urged by Europol to monitor the gangs and warned of potential conflict over control of organized crime rackets and territory. The outlaw biker clubs were reportedly recruiting far-right militants, football "hooligans" and former military personnel in an attempt to take control of drug, weapon and human trafficking routes.

== United States ==
On February 13, 2017, Kyle Wayne Seagraves, a member of the Rock Machine South Carolina chapter was tragically killed in an automotive incident in the town of Goose Creek where he lived. The crash was caused when the "at-fault" motorist failed to yield for his motorcycle. Seagraves was not wearing a helmet at the time of the accident, at the time of his death he was the youngest member of the Rock Machine in the United States aged only 22 years old.

In June 2017, Sean Dubanowich was a member of the Rock Machine USA. He was arrested and charged by US authorities for smuggling steroids from Thailand and selling them in America and Canada. By the time of his court appearance he had become an associate of the Satudarah MC.

On September 14, 2019, David Wayne Gilbert (Ranger) was a full-patch member of the Rock Machine N. Carolina Chapter. He was killed in a motorcycle accident. While traveling on the Highway 421, his motorcycle collided with a Chevy Malibu; he died shortly after.

On June 21, 2023, Travis "Lead" Goff, a high-ranking member of the Rock Machine MC, was arrested in Missouri by police after he failed to yield for a red light, he was in possession of a 9mm magazine. On the same day, authorities managed to gain a warrant for his storage building in Camden County, which had to be cleared by the bomb squad before officers could enter. Inside police found cocaine, methamphetamine, psilocybin mushrooms, multiple Kevlar vests, A second 9mm magazine for the "Springfield Hellcat" pistol, 17 blasting caps and 3 electronic blasting caps, and a Rocket Launcher. Police also found Rock Machine Merchandise and a stack of applications for the club. Goff was charged with drug trafficking in the second-degree and unlawful possession of a firearm. Goff was originally arrested on a stop and hold out of Boone County for "felony weapons charges", he would receive an additional two charges for illegal possession of firearms.

- Patch issues

In November 2017, it had been announced that Rock Machine patches were being fraudulently sold in the United States by self-proclaimed Rock Machine World President Suat Erköse. In exchange for the $300, the individuals would receive a patch and inclusion into the Rock Machine Motorcycle Club, this came along with accusations in the motorcycle community of the Rock Machine becoming an "internet club". But once paid, the patches were never sent to recipients. Suat denies these accusations.

The legitimate Rock Machine Motorcycle Club established itself in the United States during 2008, with permission and guidance from then Canadian Rock Machine leader Sean Brown. The US RMMC Nomads were formed and began recruiting veteran ex-members of Vagos MC, Mongols, Hells Angels and the Ching-a-Ling Motorcycle Clubs. They also had chapters from Avengers MC, Kingsmen MC, Sadistic Souls MC and Wrecking Crew becoming probationary chapters for the beginning of the Rock Machine United States, which as of 2021 has 8 chapters.

When asked about the situation a former longtime member of the Rock Machine USA said:

It wasn't like that for us, We were doing background checks on potential members. At first, we were bringing in guys that wanted to leave their 1% nation to join us. We had ex Vagos, Mongols, Hells Angels, Chingalings, To name a few. We would let in members of 1% Support as Probationary. We had guys from the Avengers, Kingsmen, Sadistic Souls, Wrecking Crew, all over from Florida up to Connecticut. We didn't want fresh guys to start or weekenders. We needed guys who would fight because we realized we would have to. Everyone can say they will make a stand but to actually do so is something else. We soon after began prospecting people who wanted to come around in the states where chapters were started. It did cost $400, as with any club you join it costs money, and this was to pay for a background check and your patch set.

The fraudulent scam did lead to friction between Suat's faction and the genuine Rock Machine MC USA, after he attempted to form a chapter in Las Vegas, Nevada.

Yes. He attempted to open a Las Vegas chapter with Two guys in Nevada. We promptly handled that situation. Suat finally agreed to knock it off as long as we didn't publicly talk shit about him. He was hoping we would embrace his bullshit world (Facebook) chapter.

The Rock Machine chapter in Connecticut which now acts as the head chapter of the United States was formed in 2015 and a later interview with a current member, former President of the club in the US and current Rock Machine USA spokesperson, cleared up the situation, and when asked about the selling of patches online he stated:

Suat was a thorn in our side for months here in the USA, when we first attempted to start the club here we were pulled in many directions. The different factions all pointed us in a different direction. We spoke with the club in Canada and we did speak with Suat, we also spoke with the members out of Australia who were sponsored by Canada. The Mother Chapter out of Canada agreed to allow us to open through Australia. We started with 5 guys as a probationary chapter, before eventually we spread throughout the East coast. This obviously created animosity with Suat.

We had a few situations where we turned guys away (from the Rock Machine) and they contacted Suat in an attempt to open chapters through him. Two of the three original members were very active with social media and immediately fed into the Suat bashing online. Since those members removal from the club we have reached out to Suat and did broker a deal that we would not feed into this internet bullshit, nor would we publicly bash him as long as he agreed not to recruit in the United States. Whatever anyone says bad about the man, he has kept his word with us and we do keep an open line of communication with him to this day for diplomatic reasons.

Any issues he has or we have are easily handled with a phone call. We are aware of the horror stories with people from the United States sending money to Suat for patches and never receiving them. I personally have never seen actual proof of this and probably wouldn't entertain anyone's complaints. If you are stupid enough to think you can join a 1% club through the mail you deserve to lose your money! We have 8 active charters in the United States and anyone is welcome to knock on our door and state their intentions. No one in this country will fly a Rock Machine patch without coming in the correct way.

The journalist then asked about the proper process in which someone becomes a member of the legitimate Rock Machine USA and if it was similar to the process north of the border in Canada, the RMMC United States spokesperson responded with:

Despite what is said about the club through the internet we run a tight ship. Everyone from the Nomads to the hangarounds throughout the country knows each other on a first name basis, we know each other's families through meetings, extensive background checks are done, everyone comes in as a hang around, prospect or probationary and no one person makes the decision as to who joins. It starts with a hang around period and application that's sent to the nationals, upon approval the membership fee is then sent to nationals and only after that can someone prospect or come in probationary. Probationary is only used when starting new chapters or for members who have come from established crews and clubs.

=== Issues with the Iron Order ===
In late 2017, The "Iron Order Truth Crew" part of the Iron Order Motorcycle Club obtained the Rock Machine USA club website information from a beleaguered former member and changed things in attempt to hurt the reputation of the Rock Machine.

The Rock Machine leadership in the United States released a statement, declaring that the "Iron Order Truth Crew page" was influenced by law enforcement. This has been a common criticism about the Iron Order in the motorcycle community. Initially it was believed that the website had been hacked and then sold to the Iron Order, this turned out to be incorrect however, when it was found that one of their own former members that was out in bad standing had given them the information, there was also rumors of information being leaked to law enforcement by the Truth Crew. A spokesperson for the Rock Machine USA stated:

It was a combination of him (former member) and a wife of another member from New York. She recently fabricated paperwork on another one of our guys. It's been ridiculous. The problem with the Iron Order Truth Crew site is we know for a fact that they are in bed with law enforcement. One of the pictures they use against us was taken by the task force while everyone was standing in front of the clubhouse. There is no way anyone should have a copy of that picture.

== Vietnam ==
In 2013, the Rock Machine Motorcycle Club formed a chapter in Ho Chi Minh City, Vietnam, which was formerly known as Saigon. They had allowed a sizeable Vietnamese street gang to become a large probationary chapter. The Ho Chi Minh City or Saigon chapter as it was referred too, promised to learn how to ride motorcycles. But by 2014, the Rock Machine had frozen the chapter, due to its members failing their probationary period by not learning to ride, even though some had purchased motorcycles. The former Rock Machine Vietnam members ended up joining a local street gang that operated under a motorcycle club structure and wore biker regalia.

== See also ==
- Bandidos MC criminal allegations and incidents
- Hells Angels MC criminal allegations and incidents
