= Vendettas Motorcycle Club =

Canadian outlaw motorcycle club

- Emblem of the Vendettas MC
- Founded: 2009; 17 years ago
- Founded by: Rock Machine
- Founding location: Winnipeg, Manitoba, Canada
- Years active: 2009–present
- Territory: Chapters in Canada, Australia, Russia, Sweden and Serbia
- Membership (est.): Estimated 200+ worldwide
- Criminal activities: Drug trafficking, Murder, Assault, Extortion
- Allies: Rock Machine; Loners MC; SS Elite Motorcycle Club; Hell Hounds MC; New Blood MC; Fearless Bandits MC
- Rivals: Redlined Motorcycle Club; RCMP

The Vendettas Motorcycle Club, or Vendettas Crew, is an International outlaw motorcycle club founded in Winnipeg, Manitoba, Canada in 2009. It was established by the more well-known Rock Machine Motorcycle Club (RMMC) to act as a support club throughout the Canadian province of Manitoba, but would grow to be an international support club of the RMMC with chapters in Canada, Australia, Russia, Sweden and Serbia.

== History ==
In 2008, a series of raids carried out by Winnipeg Police and Manitoba RCMP left the Hells Angels in the province crippled, the Rock Machine Motorcycle Club was seeking to expand west, an RCMP representative claimed the Rock Machine "graciously thanked law enforcement for handing them the province” they quickly gained momentum in Manitoba becoming the dominant club in Winnipeg, in January 2009 the Vendettas Motorcycle Club was established as a support club by The Rock Machine to give them support in the province. In early 2009, clashes between the Rock Machine, supported by the Vendettas Motorcycle Club, and the Hells Angels and their support club, the Redline MC, occurred frequently and reached a height over the summer months of 2011, with several shootings and fire-bombings linked to the groups. The RM support club, the Vendettas Motorcycle Club, emerged victorious over the Redline MC and established four chapters in Manitoba (Winnipeg, Winnipeg East, Brandon, and Thompson).

In 2015, the Vendettas opened chapters in Australia and Russia. Other Rock Machine support clubs like the SS Elite Motorcycle Club, Hell Hounds MC and New Blood MC shared the same colors, so the Rock Machine community gave them the name, the "Black and Platinum Family". As a support club, they are tasked with providing security and manpower, support, enforcement, and logistics to any Rock Machine MC chapter. The Vendettas report to the RMMC chapter in Winnipeg, but is also required to support local chapters across Canada and worldwide. Those that complete this task for the duration of the probationary period will receive requests to become members of the Rock Machine Motorcycle Club.

== Chapter list ==
=== Canada (7) ===
- Country-Wide
  - Vendettas MC Canada Nomads chapter
- Manitoba
  - Winnipeg chapter(Mother chapter)
  - Winnipeg East chapter
  - Brandon chapter
  - Thompson chapter
- Ontario
  - Hawksbury chapter
  - Hastings Chapter
- Quebec
  - Montreal

=== International (10) ===
- World-wide
  - Vendettas MC International Nomads chapter
- Australia
  - Vendettas MC Sydney chapter
  - Vendettas MC Australia Nomads chapter
- Russia
  - Vendettas MC Moscow chapter
  - Vendettas MC Russia Nomads chapter
- Sweden
  - Vendettas MC Stockholm chapter
  - Vendettas MC Kalmar chapter
  - Vendettas MC Kristianstad chapter
  - Vendettas MC Sweden Nomads chapter
- Serbia
  - Vendettas MC Belgrade chapter
  - Vendettas MC Serbia Nomads chapter

== Criminal allegations and incidents ==
In 2010, an arson occurred when a flare gun was shot through the window of a home on Mighton Avenue, in Winnipeg Manitoba, the property had ties to the Redlined MC (Hells Angels support club). The police seized a loaded nine millimetre handgun from the burnt out building. The Vendettas are suspected by authorities of being behind the incident. In July 2011, the Vendettas Mother chapter clubhouse on Taft Crescent in Winnipeg was attacked and strafed by bullets, the incident resulted in a 14-year-old being struck by gunfire, but he survived. Winnipeg Police said the teenager was an innocent bystander inside a residence struck by bullets. Media sources say the real targets in the shootings on Taft and in the area of the Vendettas Winnipeg East chapter clubhouse on Canberra Road a week prior were the Vendettas MC, a puppet club of the Rock Machine.

On August 9, 2011, three Police officers were injured when a Dodge Avenger crashed into multiple police vehicles at a routine traffic stop. The officers were transported to hospital; one with serious injuries after the Avenger allegedly hit two marked police cruisers and an unmarked truck, all of which according to the Winnipeg Police sustained serious damage. Authorities took two members of the Rock Machine associated Vendettas Motorcycle Club and a woman into custody and seized a loaded pistol.

Clashes had started between the Rock Machine supported by the Vendettas Motorcycle Club and the Hells Angels and their support Club, the Redlined MC in 2009 but reached a height over the summer months of 2011, with the Vendettas being involved in several shootings and fire-bombings. By the Fall, the Vendettas Motorcycle Club emerged victorious over the Redlined MC. In early November 2011, the Rock Machine or Vendettas bombed a house belonging to a member of the Hells Angels. The explosive used was crude and homemade, little damage was caused. On the same day, a Redlined member was assaulted, the court documents stated he refused medical treatment.

In 2013, raids conducted by RCMP and local police resulted in the seizure of large amounts of narcotics and firearms, explosives and the arrest of 11 full-patch members of The Rock Machine and a prospect from the club's Winnipeg chapter. The Vendettas Motorcycle Club also had several members arrested in these raids targeting RMMC operations. At some point a large number of Vendettas passed their probationary period, and were patched into the Rock Machine Motorcycle Club.
