= List of outlaw motorcycle clubs =

This is an alphabetical list of outlaw motorcycle clubs.

== Outlaw motorcycle clubs ==
Name	Year founded	Location Founded	Notes	Citations
69'ers MC	c. 1960s	Brooklyn, New York		
Anatolian Soldiers Motorcycle Club	2002	Izmir, Turkiye	Patchover in 2017	
Annihilators Motorcycle Club	1974	Richmond Hill, Ontario, Canada	Merged with the Loners in June 1999. Led by Canadian gangster Wayne Kellestine, later convicted of the Shedden massacre.	
Bacchus Motorcycle Club	1972	Albert County, New Brunswick, Canada	Said to be one of Canada's oldest outlaw motorcycle clubs, they also stand as one of nation's largest in Canada with more than one chapter in New Brunswick, Nova Scotia, Prince Edward Island, Newfoundland & Ontario. Its members are known to only ride Harley-Davidson motorbikes.	
Bandidos	1966	San Leon, Texas, US	The Bandidos MC is estimated to have between 3,000 and 3,500 members in 22 countries. The FBI and the Criminal Intelligence Service Canada have named the Bandidos an "outlaw motorcycle gang".	
Black Devils MC	1969	Wiesbaden, Germany	In addition to Germany, the club has several chapters in Italy.	
The First Order MC	2024	Balen, Belgium		
Black Diamond Riders	1953	Toronto, Canada		
Black Pistons	2002	Neuwied, Germany	Official Support club of the Outlaws MC. Has approximately 70 domestic chapters in 20 nations.	
Black Uhlans	c. 1970s	Queensland, Australia		
Blue Angels	1963	Glasgow, Scotland	Formed by Allan Morrison and Billy Gordon in the Maryhill area of Glasgow, Scotland. Four chapters in Scotland and Leeds, England.	
Bones MC	1968	Frankfurt, Germany	Patched over to the Hells Angels in 1999.	
Breed Motorcycle Club	1965	Jersey City, New Jersey, US	A former one-percenter OMCG that existed within the Northeastern United States. Disbanded in 2006.	
Brother Speed	1969	Boise, Idaho, Bend, Oregon US	Operates within various states of the American Northwest. Membership reportedly consists of at least 200.	
Bullshit Motorcycle Club	1979	Tårnby, Amager, Denmark	Dissolved in 1988 after many of its members were killed by rival Hells Angels in the Copenhagen Biker War.	
Caloh Wagoh	2016	The Hauge, Netherlands	Banned and dissolved by the Amsterdam District Court in 2021.	
Cannonball	1991	Helsinki, Finland and Estonia	The group started out as a Hells Angels support club, before eventually branching off into its own unaffiliated independent entity.	
Chicanos Motorcycle Club	2003	Pritzwalk, Germany	With chapters in at least 8 countries, they are one of the most well-known support clubs for the Bandidos MC.	
Chosen Few	1959	Los Angeles, US	A mixed race outlaw motorcycle club that has chapters in at least 34 U.S. states and the Philippines.	
Club Deroes	1971	Perth, Australia		
Coffin Cheaters	1970	Perth, Australia	In the 1980s, the gang was among the four dominant outlaw motorcycle clubs in Western Australia. Currently operates charters in Norway, Australia and the United States.	
Comanchero	1968	Sydney, New South Wales, Australia	Has four chapters in Australia, in addition to having a European presence within Russia, Bosnia and Spain. They are also active in Thailand and the United States. As of 2009, its membership consists of approximately 80 to 100 members.	
Cossacks Motorcycle Club	1969	Tyler, Texas	Notable for their involvement in the 2015 Waco shootout.	
Devils Diciples	1967	Fontana, California, US	Although they share the same name, the group is unrelated to the Devils Disciples MC in Northwestern Europe or the Devil's Disciples MC in Quebec. There is also a club in Massachusetts known as the Devil's Desciples MC that also lacks any connection to this group (aside from the name).	
Devil's Disciples Motorcycle Club	c. 1960s	Quebec, Canada	Disbanded by 1975 following a violent turf war with the Popeye Moto Club. Some notable leaders of the Devil's Disciples included Jacques "Coco" Mercier, Gilles Forget, and Claude "Johnny Halliday" Ellefsen.	
Devils Henchmen	c. 1970s	Timaru, New Zealand		
Diablos Motorcycle Club	1999	Pattaya, Thailand	Populous support club for the Bandidos MC, mostly active in parts of Europe and Asia.	
Diablos	1961	San Bernardino, California, US		
Dirty Dozen Motorcycle Club	1964	Arizona	Merged with the Hells Angels in 1997.	
Druids MC North	1978	Sheffield, England		
East Bay Dragons	1959	Oakland, California	Originally founded as a car club in 1955 by Tobie Gene Levingston. Switched to being a motorcycle club in 1959 on the advice of Levingston's long time friend Sonny Barger.	
El Forastero	1962	Sioux City, Iowa, US	Formed by bikers who had been turned down for attempting to establish a chapter of the Satan Slaves Motorcycle Club.	
Epitaph Riders	1969	Christchurch, New Zealand	Absorbed by the Head Hunters Motorcycle Club.	
The Finks	1970s	Adelaide, South Australia, Australia	A majority of the group's members, most of which belonged to the Perth chapter, were patched over to the Mongols Motorcycle Club in 2013.	
Free Souls Motorcycle Club	1969	Eugene, Oregon, US	Founded in 1969, this club is based in Eugene, Oregon with additional chapters in Washington state as well as Germany.	
Galloping Goose	1942	Los Angeles, US	A Hollister riot participant with a predominant presence throughout American Midwest.	
Gate Keepers Motorcycle Club	2013	Musquodoboit Harbour, Nova Scotia	Canadian support club for the Hells Angels MC. Active in Ontario and Nova Scotia as of 2025.	
Gitans MC	1967	Sherbrooke, Quebec, Canada	Known infamously for going to war with the Atomes MC, another drug-dealing outlaw motorcycle club based out of Sherbrooke. After successfully wiping out the Atomes MC, they went on to be absorbed ("patched-over") by the Hells Angels MC in 1984 to re-emerge as what is now the Hells Angels Sherbrooke charter.	
Gladiators MC	c. 1980s	Oslo, Norway	Not to be confused with the Australian-founded club nor the non-outlaw military motorcycle club based in Ohio - which all share the same name.	
Gods Garbage	Early 1970s	Albany, Western Australia		
Gremium	1972	Mannheim, Germany	Gremium has over 100 chapters claims to be the largest motorcycle club in Germany.	
Grim Reapers	1967	Alberta, Canada	Unrelated to the American-based club of the same name.	
Grim Reapers MC	1965	Louisville, Kentucky	An independent three-piece patch outlaw motorcycle club. The group's members exclusively ride Harley-Davidson motorbikes.	
Gypsy Joker	1956	San Francisco, US	Located in Australia, Germany, Norway, South Africa and the United States of America.	
Hardliners MC	2019	Haarlem, Netherlands	Founded by former Hells Angels Haarlem president Lysander de R. With at least 22 chapters, the club is reported to be one of the largest outlaw biker gangs in the Netherlands.	
Head Hunters	1967	West Auckland, New Zealand	Having a national presence within the country, the HHMC sustain a reputation as being one of New Zealand's most notorious organized crime groups.	
Hells Angels MC	1948	San Bernardino, California, US	Worldwide membership, estimated over 6,000 members in 66 countries. Supporter clubs & groups include Red & White, Big Red Machine, Red Devils MC, Gate Keepers MC, and many others.	
Hell's Lovers	1967	Chicago, US	Active across the United States of America, they are a multiracial outlaw biker group.	
Hessians Motorcycle Club	1968	Costa Mesa, California, US	A small, but notable, American outlaw motorcycle gang which maintains at least 5 chapters across the nation.	
Highway 61 MC	1968	Auckland, New Zealand	One of the largest gangs in New Zealand, and for a time, the nation's largest outlaw motorcycle club. Also operates in the Commonwealth of Australia.	
Highwaymen	1954	Detroit, US	Currently the largest outlaw motorcycle club in the city of Detroit.	
Homietos Motorcycle Club	N/A	N/A	Active as of 2023 in Oklahoma City, Kansas City, and Texas. Rival gang of the Bandidos Motorcycle Club.	
Iron Horsemen	1960s	Cincinnati, US	A major 1%er club in the United States. Despite maintaining a high-profile for themselves in the country, they do not have any international charters and are exclusively domestic.	
Kamikaze Riders	2004	Anderlecht, Belgium		
Kinfolk Motorcycle Club	2016	Texas, U.S.	A one-percenter motorcycle club consisting of former Bandidos Motorcycle Club members. The two clubs are known for their long-standing rivalry.	
Kings Crew Motorcycle Club	c. 1977	Alberta, Canada	Believed to have been patched-over by the Hells Angels sometime in the 1990s.	
Life and Death MC	1978	Greater Western Sydney, Australia		
Lone Legion Brotherhood	Unknown	Blenheim, New Zealand		
Lone Wolf MC	1971	New South Wales, Australia		
Loners Motorcycle Club	1984	Woodbridge, Ontario, Canada	Co-founded by Frank Lenti. Now an International club with over 30 chapters Worldwide.	
Lost Breed	1976	Nelson, New Zealand	A now-defunct outlaw biker club which had a very eminent existence in the New Zealand city of Nelson. They were "shut down" by the Hells Angels in 2015.	
Market Street Commandos	1940s	San Francisco, US	Notable for their participation in the Hollister riot of 1947. They would later merge with the Hells Angels to form the latter's San Francisco charter.	
Median Empire	2011	Cologne, Germany	Perdominantly Kurdish-German self-proclaimed "1%er club". In addition to Germany, the group has chapters in other European countries.	
Mobshitters	1970	Hurstville, New South Wales, Australia	A small, but significant, Australian outlaw bikie gang.	
Mongols	1969	Montebello, California, US	Although the club is primarily situated in SoCal, it maintains a nationwide presence and has additional chapters in 28 countries.	
Moonshiners	1934	Compton, California, US	Known for their participation in the "Hollister riot".	
Nomads	1968	Newcastle, Australia	Has a substantial amount of both chapters and members across the Commonwealth of Australia.	
No Surrender	2013	Zundert, Netherlands	One of the most notable outlaw motorcycle clubs to have come out of the Netherlands. With over 1600 members across the globe, they have chapters in Belgium, Germany, France, Italy, Sweden, Norway, Spain, Morocco, Lebanon, United Kingdom, Thailand, Bosnia, Suriname, Georgia, New Zealand, Australia, Canada, and the United States.	
Notorious	2007	Sydney, Australia	Disbanded in 2012, after law enforcement arrested prominent members, and other members quitting the gang life.	
Notorious MC	2013	Wuppertal, Germany	An independent 1%er OMCG which originated in Germany, and has since expanded into England, Spain and Canada.	
Odin's Warriors MC	1971	Brisbane, Australia		
Original Red Devils Motorcycle Club	1948	Hamilton, Ontario, Canada	Canada's oldest outlaw motorcycle club. patched over to Bacchus MC in 2014	
Osmanen Germania	c. 2014–2015	Hessen, Germany	Banned by the Federal Ministry of the Interior in 2018.	
Outlaws	1935	McCook, Illinois, US	With over 5,000 members in 43 countries.	
Pagan's	1959	Prince George's County, Maryland, US	Regarded by law enforcement to be among the largest and most criminally involved outlaw motorcycle gangs in the United States.	
Peckerwoods	1987	Santee, California, US	An all-white outlaw motorcycle club in the United States; members of other races are forbidden from joining. This small organization has been the subject of notoriety due to its connections with the American white supremacist movement.	
Pissed Off Bastards of Bloomington	1945	Bloomington, California, US	Members of the group played an integral role in the highly publicized Hollister Invasion.	
Popeye Moto Club	1950s-1960s	Montreal, Quebec	Absorbed by the Hells Angels in 1977 to become the first Hells Angels Motorcycle Club chapter in Canada.	
Rebels	1969	Brisbane, Australia	Originally known as the Confederates, this outlaw OMCG has 70-something chapters worldwide and is the largest in Australia.	
Rebels	1968	Red Deer, Alberta, Canada	One of the four dominant outlaw motorcycle clubs in Alberta prior to 1997.	
Red Devils Motorcycle Club	c. 2001	Karlstad, Värmland, Sweden	The largest and most prominent support club for the Hells Angels MC. Active in nearly 20 countries.	
Road Knights	1979	Timaru, New Zealand	As of 2009, Road Knights membership in New Zealand was low and former leadership had either dispersed, died or gone to jail.	
Road Rats	1960s	London, England, U.K.	Said to be one of England's oldest outlaw motorcycle clubs.	
Road Runners	1978	Silesia, Poland	In addition to Poland, they are located in Germany, Switzerland and the US. There exist more motorcycle clubs called Road Runners MC, but these are unrelated to this particular group. Multiple individual members of Road Runners MC have been suspected at times to be connected with various criminal activities. Several members, among them the club's Board of Directors, were arrested in December 2006 by the Polish Centralne Biuro Śledcze (CBS, the national investigative authority). The indictment was, among other things, on charges of forming a criminal organization. The suspicion was not confirmed, and all but one member — who died while in custody in unexplained circumstances — were released from remand in 2007. The media reports surrounding the arrest were criticized by Polish director and filmmaker Sylvester Latkowski. Latkowski is planning to create a film about the motorcycle club members he claims to have met in person. The association has donated bicycles for the children, and provided assistance for the renovation of the home premises.	
Road Tramps	1987	Limerick, Ireland		
Rock Machine	1986	Montreal, Quebec, Canada	One of the two primary belligerents in the Quebec Biker War (the other being the Hells Angels). The club was founded by Salvatore Cazzetta.	
Rockers Motor Club	1992	Montreal, Quebec		
Sadistic Souls Motorcycle Club	2010	Wood River, Illinois, US	Primarily active in the Midwestern U.S. but also has chapters in New Zealand, Australia, and the United Kingdom. Maintains strong ties with the United Klans of America and The Creativity Movement. Likewise, they are listed by the Southern Poverty Law Center as being an active neo-Nazi hate group in the United States.	
Satan's Choice MC	1965	Oshawa, Ontario, Canada	During the 1970s, the group had been regarded as being Canada's largest outlaw motorcycle club. Founded by Bernie Guindon.	
Satans Slaves	c. 1967	Shipley, West Yorkshire, U.K.	Mostly situated in England, with a single chapter in Scotland, as well as a growing presence in Germany. This particular one-percenter club is unrelated to the now-defunct American club of the same name. They are also not to be confused with the Wellington-based Satan's Slaves Motorcycle Club, who include an apostrophe in the spelling of their name.	
Satudarah	1990	Moordrecht, Netherlands	Affirms that it welcomes members of all races into the club. Outlawed within the Netherlands in 2018 by the Dutch justice system.	
Schwarze Schar MC	2008	Wismar, Germany	Banned by the Federal Ministry of the Interior in 2013.	
Sin City Deciples	1966	Gary, Indiana, US	One of the most established, extensive and oldest African-American outlaw motorcycle clubs of the US.	
Sinn Féin MC	c. 1970s	Upper Hutt, New Zealand	Patched over to the Head Hunters MC in 2011.	
Solo Angeles	1959	Tijuana, Mexico	Known for their annual charity run, where they deliver toys to poor children around Tijuana.	
Sons of Aesir	2005	Arizona, US	An independent outlaw motorcycle club based out of Arizona. They have been described as a neo-Nazi white supremacist biker gang by the Anti Defamation League.	
Sons of Satan	1949	Lancaster, Pennsylvania, US	A brother club for the Pagan's MC.	
Sons of Silence	1966	Niwot, Colorado, US	For a time, the group was designated by federal law enforcement as one of the "big five" motorcycle gangs in the US. Though mostly known to be a US-based club, the Sons of Silence also manages chapters in Germany.	
Straight Satans Motorcycle Club	1959	Santa Monica, California	A now-defunct small “one‑percenter” outlaw motorcycle club founded in SoCal in July 1959, based around Santa Monica and Venice. They gained a dubious reputation in the late 1960s due to their connections with the Manson Family, notably involvement in arming and associating with members of the cult.	
Tribesmen Motorcycle Club	1980	Murupara, New Zealand	A prominent Māori bikie gang in New Zealand.	
Trust Motorcycle Club	1984	Ergoldsbach, Germany	The club has 33 chapters in Germany, as well as seven chapters in Romania, one chapter in Belgium, and one chapter in Thailand.	
Vagos	1965	San Bernardino, California, U.S.	Regarded as one of the largest and most powerful one-percenter biker gangs in the United States.	
Vendettas Motorcycle Club	2009	Winnipeg, Manitoba, Canada	Support club for the Rock Machine Motorcycle Club.	
Warlocks	1965	Philadelphia, US	Said to be the first one-percenter club to be founded in the state of Pennsylvania. Allied with the Philly mob and Wheels of Soul MC.	
Warlocks	1967	Orlando, Florida, US	Has chapters in various parts of the United States in addition to Canada, the United Kingdom and Germany.	
Wheels of Soul	1967	Philadelphia, US	A predominantly black (but multiracial) one-percenter club.	
Zulus	1969	Akron, Ohio, US	Known for being one of the first Afro-American 1%er clubs in the United States.	

== See also ==
- List of outlaw motorcycle club conflicts
- List of motorcycle clubs
- List of criminal enterprises, gangs and syndicates
