= Redbone =

Redbone or red bone, may refer to:

== People ==
- Redbone (ethnicity), a term historically used in much of the southern United States to denote a multiracial individual or culture
- "Redbone", a word in African-American Vernacular English, for lightskinned African Americans

=== Persons ===
- Leon Redbone (1949–2019), singer-songwriter and musician specializing in jazz, blues, and Tin Pan Alley classics
- Martha Redbone (born 1966), American blues and soul singer

== Places ==
- Redbone Library, Leesburg, Georgia, USA
- Redbone Community House, Barnesville, Georgia, USA; an NRHP-listed building

== Arts, entertainment, media ==
- Red Bones (novel), a 2009 novel by Ann Cleeves
- "Red Bones" (episode), a 2013 season 1 two-parter TV episode of Shetland (TV series)
- Red Bones, a fictional gang from the U.S. TV series Banshee; see List of Banshee episodes
- Red Bone Palace, a fictional location from the Japanese TV show Yashahime; see List of Yashahime episodes

=== Music ===
- Redbone (band), an American rock band founded in 1969 by brothers Pat and Lolly Vegas
- Redbone (album), a 1970 album by the eponymous band Redbone
- "Redbone" (song), recorded by American rapper and singer Childish Gambino

== Other ==
- Redbone Coonhound, an American breed of hunting dog
- Red bone grass, a cultivar of Rhodopeltis; see List of marine aquarium plant species

== See also ==
- Red bone marrow
- Red skeleton (disambiguation)
- Red skull (disambiguation)
- Red Death (disambiguation)
