= Black Seven =

Black Seven may refer to:

- Alternative name of the German Gremium Motorcycle Club
- Black Seven, a team in DC Comics
- Criminal organization in the 1920 American film serial The Screaming Shadow
- The Black Seven, a participant of the MIT Mystery Hunt
- The Black Seven, a 1946 book by American writer Carol Kendall
