= Trust Motorcycle Club =

Outlaw motorcycle club

- Formation: 1984; 42 years ago
- Founded at: Ergoldsbach, Bavaria, Germany
- Region served: Germany, Romania, Belgium, Thailand, Poland
- Website: www.trustmc.eu

The Trust Motorcycle Club, also called Trust Motorcycle Club Germany, are an outlaw motorcycle club based in Germany. It was founded in 1984 as a merging of several MCs. In addition to 39 German chapters, the club has seven chapters in Romania and one each in Belgium, Thailand, and Poland.

== History ==
In early 1984 the MCs MC Ergoldsbach (founded 1982), the Devil Cobra MC Moosburg, the Free Fighters MC Erding, the Ranger MC Neutraubling and some members of the Destroyer MCs Landshut merged to form the Trust MC Germany. The first chapters were in Erding, Landshut, Ergoldsbach, Neutraubling and Moosburg an der Isar. An iron cross with a white fist in the middle was chosen as the color, the middle rocker. In the beginning, it was one of the few MCs that mainly drove motorcycles from Japanese manufacturers over 600 cubic centimeters. In June 1984, some Thunderbirds MC members switched to the Trust MC and thus founded the Trust MC chapter in Munich. Over time, other chapters were founded in Germany and with 39 local groups and 13 support clubs, Trust MC is now one of the largest German MCs. There are also seven chapters in Romania along two support Black Fist chapters, one in Belgium and, since 2015, the Siam Nomads chapter in Thailand. Some of the support clubs are Iron Fist MC, Black Claw Kitzingen, Black Fear North. The regional focus of the Trust MC is Bavaria. They are one of the dominant clubs on the scene, alongside the big four clubs, i.e. the Hells Angels, the Bandidos, the Outlaws and the Gremium. The Bavarian Ministry of the Interior counts the Trust MC among the police-relevant MCs, an assessment that the Trust MC vehemently denies.

In 1993, the Trust MC was the organizer of the Presi-Rally in Donauwörth.

== See also ==
- List of outlaw motorcycle clubs
