= Masque (disambiguation) =

Masque is a form of festive courtly entertainment which flourished in 16th- and early 17th-century Europe.

Masque or Masques may also refer to:

- Masquerade ball (bal masqué), an event which the participants attend in costume wearing a mask

== Music ==
=== Classical ===
- Masques (Debussy) (1904)
- Masques (Szymanowski), a 1915-16 piano work
- Masque, W. Francis McBeth (1967)

=== Bands ===
- Masque (band), a 1980s American metal band
- Masque (Canadian band), a moniker used by the band CANO for a single 1981 album
- Masque, Vernon Reid's backing band

=== Albums ===
- Masque (Kansas album) (1975)
- Masque (King Crimson album) (1999)
- Masque (Manfred Mann's Earth Band album) (1987)
- Masque (The Mission album) (1992)
- Masques (Brand X album)

== Others ==
- Masque (comics), a fictional character from Marvel Comics' X-Men
- Masques (film), a 1987 French film
- Masque (restaurant), an Indian restaurant in Mumbai, India
- The Masque (venue), a punk rock club in central Hollywood
- Masque, a 1998 novel by F. Paul Wilson

== See also ==
- The Masque of the Red Death (disambiguation)
- Mask (disambiguation)
- Masquerade (disambiguation)
