= Red skeleton =

Red skeleton may refer to:

== Fictional characters ==
- The Red Skeleton, a fictional character from the 1950s American children's TV puppet show Time for Beany
- Red Skeleton, a fictional character from the 1956 The Three Stooges short Creeps
- Red Skeleton, a comic book character from Mystic Comics

== Other uses ==
- Red Skeleton, a cultivar of Nepenthes tropical flower, a pitcher plant; see List of Nepenthes cultivars
- Red skeleton on field of black flag, the pirate flag of Edward Low (1690–1724)

== See also ==
- Red Skelton, American comic actor and vaudevillian
- Red Lady of Paviland, the Welsh red skeleton, a Paleolithic skeleton covered in red ochre discovered in Wales
- Red skull (disambiguation)
- Redbone (disambiguation), including Red Bone
