= Disappearance of Amy Billig =

Unsolved 1974 disappearance in Florida

Amy Billig
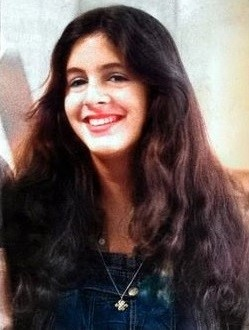
- Billig, c. 1974
- Born: January 9, 1957; Oyster Bay, New York, U.S.
- Disappeared: March 5, 1974 (aged 17); Coconut Grove, Florida, U.S. 25.72038°N 80.24946°W
- Status: Missing for 52 years, 4 months and 24 days
- Known for: Missing person
- Height: 5 ft 5 in (1.65 m)
- Parent(s): Susan Billig; Nathaniel Solomon Billig
- Distinguishing features: Caucasian female. 110 pounds. Brown hair, brown eyes. Two-inch appendectomy scar on her abdomen.

Amy Billig (January 9, 1957 – disappeared March 5, 1974) was an American high school student who disappeared while hitchhiking to her father's art studio in Coconut Grove, Florida, on March 5, 1974, at the age of 17.

Investigators believe Amy's disappearance was involuntary and although no definitive leads as to the exact circumstances surrounding her disappearance have ever materialized, unconfirmed leads indicate she may have been abducted by a motorcycle gang (most likely the Pagans) and subsequently drugged, gang-raped and murdered.

Amy's parents continued to search for their daughter for the remainder of their lives; her mother, Susan, died in 2005 at the age of 80, having continually searched for her daughter for over 31 years. Prior to her death, Susan asked Amy's brother, Joshua, to "never give up" the search for his sister.

Despite the intense publicity surrounding Amy's disappearance and repeated efforts to locate her alive or deceased, her disappearance remains unsolved. Her case remains open, and has been described as one of Florida's most enduring missing persons cases.

== Background ==
Amy Billig was born in Oyster Bay, New York, on January 9, 1957, the first of two children born to Nathaniel Solomon and Susan (née Chern) Billig. Her father owned an art gallery, while her mother was an interior designer and art dealer. The family followed the Jewish faith.

Susan Billig had suffered four miscarriages before giving birth to Amy; she later described her only daughter as a sociable, "spiritual" teenager and a "flower child", very much "into nature". Her hobbies included playing the flute and guitar in addition to reading and writing poetry. She also trained dolphins at the Miami Seaquarium. Amy was close to her mother, who later reflected: "I would look at her and think 'What did I do to deserve such a beautiful thing?'"

Due to concerns regarding crime levels in New York, the Billigs relocated from New York City to Coconut Grove, Florida, in May 1969, where Nathaniel opened an art gallery and Susan pursued her professions as an art dealer and interior designer. The family resided in a middle-class household and, by the early 1970s, were active in several community cultural organizations. Both Amy and her younger brother, Joshua (born February 14, 1958), attended local private schools.

=== Graduation year ===
By 1974, Amy was considering becoming an actress following her anticipated graduation from the Adelphi Academy of Coral Gables on March 31. (Note: The faculty at the Adelphi Academy of Coral Gables ensured Amy graduated from her school in absentia on this date. Her diploma was given to her parents.) (Note: The Adelphi Academy of Coral Gables was later discovered to be operating as a front for the prostitution of underage males via a co-conspirator in the New Orleans Troop 137 case named Peter Bradford. However, there is no evidence to suggest that Amy Billig's disappearance was connected to the child prostitution ring.) As she did not own a car, she often hitchhiked in and around her neighborhood, although never for considerable distances. At the time of her disappearance, Amy was 17 years old, was 5 ft 5 in and weighed 110 pounds. She had wavy, mid-brown, waist-length hair, a distinctive two-inch appendectomy scar on her abdomen and possibly a tattoo.

== March 5, 1974 ==
On the afternoon of March 5, 1974, Amy returned home from school, ate a yogurt, then telephoned her father to ask if she could borrow $2 to pay for a scheduled lunch with some friends in nearby Peacock Park. Her father agreed, and Amy changed her blouse and began hitchhiking to her father's art gallery on nearby Commodore Plaza to borrow the money with view to later meeting her friends for lunch. (Note: Amy's father's art gallery was less than one mile from the Billig family home.) She was observed by construction workers hitchhiking at the corner of Poinciana Street and Main Highway in Coconut Grove, close to her family home, in the early afternoon. This would prove to be the last definitive sighting of Amy, as she never arrived at her father's art gallery. At the time of her disappearance, Amy was wearing a denim miniskirt and cork platform sandals.

=== Disappearance ===
By the evening of March 5, Amy's mother and brother had become concerned when she failed to return home. This concern began when Amy's friends phoned the residence to ask Susan why her daughter had failed to meet them as promised and increased to panic when Nathaniel returned home to divulge Amy had failed to appear at his workplace as promised to borrow her lunch money. A call to the local police department only earned a promise of an investigation if Amy had not returned by morning, with Detective Michael Gonzalez informing Amy's mother: "Don't panic. Call back if Amy isn't home by morning." By 6 a.m., a frantic Susan Billig had again reported her daughter missing to the Miami Police Department; on this occasion, an investigation was launched.

== Investigation ==
Law enforcement began actively investigating Amy's disappearance immediately upon receipt of Susan's March 6 phone call, with both parents—frequently assisted by family and close acquaintances—actively participating in the investigation. Routine questioning of Amy's friends and searches of locations she was known to have frequented in the immediate hours and days following her disappearance yielded no results, and as Amy had few personal possessions on her at the time of her disappearance, investigators rapidly concluded her disappearance was involuntary. Upon learning that Amy frequently hitchhiked around her neighborhood, investigators also theorized she had most likely willingly entered her abductor's (or abductors') vehicle.

The sole item of physical evidence pertaining to Amy's disappearance subsequently discovered was her Instamatic camera, which was discovered by a hitchhiking college student in an area of grass beside the Wildwood exit on Florida's Turnpike approximately 250 miles northwest of Miami on March 18. Processing of the camera film yielded nothing fruitful to the investigation as the majority of the photographs were overexposed; however, one of the photographs depicted a light-colored pickup truck parked in front of the wall of a vine-covered building. Another image depicted a white van. Investigators were unable to locate either vehicle or identify the building.

=== Community and family efforts ===
In addition to conducting their own private search for Amy, Susan and Nathaniel Billig hired a private investigator; this individual was unable to develop any conclusive leads. The family also printed and distributed hundreds of missing persons posters throughout Miami-Dade County. Flyers in both English and Spanish were also distributed both door-to-door and in public locations throughout South Florida in the hope of generating leads regarding Amy's disappearance. The family maintained a vigil whereby a family member—typically Susan—remained close to the telephone should Amy or her kidnapper(s) initiate contact. Her mother also contacted the Miami Police Department almost daily to inquire as to updates and progress in the investigation in addition to holding several news conferences in the hope of maintaining public interest in her daughter's disappearance.

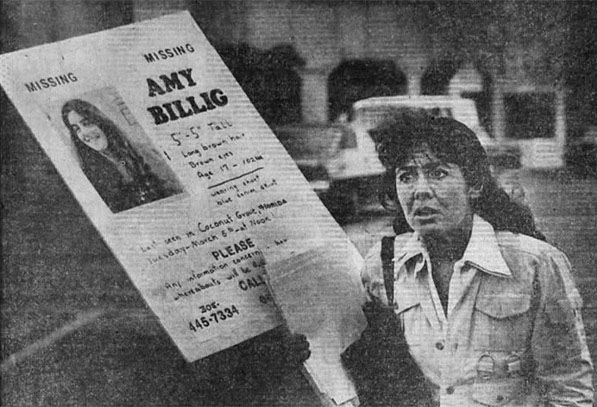
Susan Billig holds a placard appealing for information regarding her daughter nine days after her disappearance

On March 10, five days after Amy's disappearance, the first newspaper headline regarding Amy's disappearance appeared in local periodicals; this headline revealed that both police and Amy's family suspected she had been kidnapped, possibly by members of a motorcycle gang. The same evening, a benefit concert to raise funds to search for Amy raised $850 and a fund was established at a local bank to assist in search expenses. A $1,000 reward was also offered for information as to Amy's whereabouts; this reward generated several public tips, though none of the purported sightings were confirmed.

In the weeks following Amy's disappearance, her family received $2,000 in donations for reward money from friends, neighbors and colleagues, while a music festival organized by her high school raised $1,500 to fund the family's private investigation into her disappearance. An additional $1,000 was collected from former neighbors of the Billigs in New York. (Note: The Billig family would ultimately spend tens of thousands of dollars in their search for Amy.)

=== Investigative leads ===
Both police and Susan Billig received several tips from individuals indicating that Amy had been abducted by members of either the Outlaws Motorcycle Club or the Pagan's Motorcycle Club; these rival motorcycle gangs had both traveled through the Coconut Grove area of Florida en route to an annual bike festival in Daytona on the date of Amy's disappearance, and both gangs are known to have engaged in violence and abuse against females, including abduction, rape and sex trafficking. The family and investigators alike viewed this theory as the most likely to explain Amy's involuntary disappearance. (Note: The young women and girls treated in this manner by the Outlaws and the Pagans were frequently traded among members for money or items as trivial as riding gear. In addition, many were plied with drugs—with or without their consent—to ensure their subservience.)

On March 16, a telephone tip from a girl who identified herself as "Susan Johnson" claimed that Amy had been abducted by the Outlaws Motorcycle Club. Shortly thereafter, a family friend telephoned the Billig residence to inform Amy's parents he had heard from a lawyer who had previously performed legal work for the Outlaws of rumors of a teenage girl recently "taken from Miami". At Susan's behest and with the assistance of this lawyer, two members of the motorcycle gang visited the Billig household to hear her pleas for her daughter's return; one of these individuals assured Susan that if Amy was "in the Outlaw Nation, we'll return her". Days later, these individuals phoned Susan advising her to simply "forget the whole thing".

By June 1974, Susan had learned from a convenience store manager in Orlando that a young woman he positively identified as her daughter had entered his store accompanied by two bikers on several occasions to purchase vegetarian soups at a time a motorcycle gang had been in the city several weeks previous. As the fact Amy was a vegetarian had been unreleased to the media, Susan found credibility in this particular sighting that her daughter was alive and being held against her will.

==== Extortion attempt ====
Sixteen days after Amy's disappearance, her family received a phone call claiming that she had been kidnapped and was being held for a $30,000 ransom. Susan borrowed the sum from friends after hearing a voice she believed to be her daughter's in a subsequent call from this individual saying, "Mama, mama, please." A rendezvous was arranged between Susan and the caller for her to deliver the money in a black attaché case at the Fontainebleau Hotel on March 22, where the caller was arrested after Susan refused to hand over the money until he could prove he had Amy.

The perpetrators of this extortion attempt proved to be 16-year-old twin brothers Charles and Lawrence Glasser, who had no involvement in Amy's disappearance. Both brothers were arrested and charged with extortion, to which they pleaded guilty. Prior to sentencing the youths, Judge William Gladstone stated the brothers had "a long way to come back from the serious delinquent and tragic events which they caused".

Shortly after the brothers' arrest, Amy's distraught mother addressed the media, stating: "Please no more crank calls like that one. I would have done anything to get [Amy] back—begged, borrowed or stolen."

==== Stalking campaign ====
Within months of Amy's disappearance, the Billig family began receiving hoax phone calls from an unknown male who identified himself as "Johnson"; this individual openly and repeatedly taunted Amy's family—in particular her mother—and graphically illustrated the abuse and torment he claimed to be inflicting upon Amy. This individual also claimed that Amy had been abducted by members of an organized sex ring, was being held captive and that Susan herself was to suffer the same fate. In one phone call, Susan was told that her daughter had two weeks left to live; in another, he stated that he had cut off Amy's tongue. Shortly after Susan was diagnosed with lung cancer in 1992, she informed the caller of her diagnosis in the hope this knowledge would reach his conscience and he would cease the harassment or, if he were indeed Amy's abductor, release her; instead, the caller incorporated this knowledge into his threats and taunts. On two occasions, the caller agreed to meet with Susan at a proposed rendezvous, though the perpetrator failed to appear on both occasions.

Although the harassment Susan endured from this individual ultimately caused her to suffer sleep deprivation, nausea and seizures, her forbearance in the face of this ongoing harassment to secure her daughter's release led her to continually engage in dialogue with the perpetrator in the hope the calls could be traced, the caller would reveal his identity, or that he would reveal the whereabouts of her daughter. However, despite the vast number of calls this individual made to the Billig household, investigators were initially unable to identify the perpetrator because most of the calls were made from pay phones and/or the caller ended his conversations after a short period of time, thus meaning the calls could not be traced. In addition, the hoax calls were sporadic. On several occasions over the course of twenty-one years, the perpetrator would make between one and seven calls per evening for successive days; in other instances, months would lapse between his calls.

Despite the ongoing harassment from both this individual and other occasional hoax callers, the Billig family refused to change their phone number in the hope either one of the callers would reveal information ultimately securing Amy's release or that Amy herself would initiate contact with her family.

== Later developments ==
=== National search ===
In the years following her daughter's disappearance, Susan Billig—occasionally accompanied by family members and/or investigators and family friends—extended her search for her daughter nationwide upon the theory Amy had been abducted by a motorcycle gang and was being held against her will and possibly having mentally blocked memories of her past as a coping mechanism regarding her predicament. Several individuals claimed to recognize her daughter, with those providing information—almost all with connections to motorcycle gangs—frequently indicating Amy was in a state far from where Susan physically was at the time of these new developments.

==== Tulsa lead ====
By January 1976, Susan's search had extended to Oklahoma upon receipt of a tip from a gang member named David who personally contacted her to claim to have recognized her daughter from a newspaper photograph as a girl he had previously "owned". This individual agreed to meet with Susan at the family home, where he informed the Billigs their daughter had been extremely timid, submissive and "quiet like a mute" while in his company; he also described a distinctive scar upon Amy's body which had never been disclosed to the media. This information led Susan to believe David's claims.

David agreed to contact the individual he believed currently had Amy. Several weeks later, he contacted the Billigs to inform them Amy was in Tulsa. He claimed he would soon locate Amy for her mother; in expectation, Susan purchased new linen for her daughter's bedroom—which she had kept intact since Amy's disappearance—in anticipation of her return before meeting David by prearrangement in a Tulsa tavern where David claimed Amy would be returned to her mother; however, a fight ensued between David and other gang members in which he was injured. Another gang member ushered Susan into a taxi.

David contacted Susan approximately five weeks later—alive but with his kneecaps reportedly having been broken in a likely retaliation attack at the tavern for being an informant—to inform Susan her daughter was now in Seattle working as an erotic dancer in a bar before adding this would be the last time she ever heard from him. Susan traveled to Seattle to pursue this lead, to no avail. (Note: At Nathaniel's insistence, Susan was admitted to Jackson Memorial Hospital immediately prior to her initially scheduled flight to Seattle after she complained of severe chest pains; she was admitted to the hospital's cardiac intensive care unit, where she underwent vascular bypass surgery.)

=== Terri Ann Warner theory ===
In August 1985, a 33-year-old man named Alex Courvier informed a Pennsylvania police force he had recently seen a missing persons flyer depicting Amy Billig and recognized her as a young woman named Terri Ann Warner, who had died of natural causes in Texas in the summer of 1974 and whose body had never been claimed by loved ones.

To confirm or discount Courvier's theory, a Miami detective and a local dentist flew to Vernon, Texas, to examine the exhumed body, although they were soon able to determine via examining of the decedent's dental records the young woman was not Amy Billig. (Note: The forensic examination of this body revealed the decedent to be approximately thirteen years old.) Both Susan and Nathaniel expressed relief the body was not that of their daughter, with Susan again stating her unwavering hope her daughter may still be alive.

=== Psychic involvement ===
In the mid-1980s, Miami Herald reporter Edna Buchanan, investigating the unrelated and unsolved strangling murder of a Las Vegas banker, contacted a renowned Californian psychic with a noted reputation for accuracy to seek information as to the banker's murderer. Upon what she later described as an impulse, after discussing the banker's murder, she exclaimed, "Where's Amy?" without divulging further details as to whom she was referring to; in response, the psychic replied: "Lost. Her bones are scattered across the sand" before explaining Amy Billig had died at the hands of a lone male during a rape and the bones and sand in her visions were beneath water.

According to the psychic, Amy's murderer had not intended to kill her, but that the struggle between the two had "gotten out of hand"; her murderer had subsequently, in a fugue-like state, disposed of her remains beneath a body of water. Furthermore, Amy's murderer still resided in Miami, was haunted by his crime, and had committed no other violent acts in the intervening years.

=== Hoax caller identified ===
In October 1995, FBI agents successfully identified the individual who had subjected Susan Billig and her family to over twenty-one years of harassment by tracing a call the individual had made from his cellular phone. The caller was 48-year-old Henry Johnson Blair, a married father of two daughters who had worked for the United States Customs Service for twenty-four years. Blair was arrested and formally charged with three counts of aggravated stalking; he was released on a $75,000 bond to await trial.

At trial, Blair formally pleaded not guilty to aggravated stalking, although he was convicted of two counts of stalking on March 6, 1996. He was sentenced to two years' imprisonment.

Blair admitted at trial to having obtained a form of sexual pleasure from making the hoax calls but insisted he had not intended to cause distress; he also claimed to be an alcoholic with an obsessive–compulsive disorder and thus not responsible for his actions. He insisted he had never met Amy and that he actually knew nothing about her disappearance. Susan herself expressed disbelief at Blair's actions, stating to the press: "I just don't understand why he pinpointed me and Amy. There has to be a reason."

Susan later settled a $5 million lawsuit against Blair, adding he had never apologized to her for his campaign of harassment.

=== Diary entry theory ===
Six weeks prior to her disappearance, Amy is known to have written in her journal about a man she called "Hank", whom she claimed had asked her to accompany him to South America, although the entry indicates she had "told him he is crazy" in response. Due to Henry Blair's nickname being Hank, his van strongly resembling one depicted in a photograph developed from Amy's Instamatic camera, and his job requiring him to temporarily relocate to South America around the time Amy specified in her journal, some have theorized Blair may have been more involved with Amy's disappearance than initially believed, though this theory is unproven.

=== Deathbed confession ===
Prior to his death, a high-ranking former member of the Pagans named Paul Branch confessed that members of his motorcycle gang were responsible for Amy's abduction and murder. This detailed confession was given by Branch to his wife shortly before his death in Charlottesville, Virginia, in December 1997. Reportedly, Branch had chosen to confide the specifics of Amy's abduction and murder to his wife when informed his own death was imminent.

According to Branch's confession—given by his wife to investigators after his death—Amy had been abducted and taken to "a party" in the Everglades, where the Pagans operated a trailer-clubhouse. According to the confession, Amy had insulted some of the members of the gang, whereupon she was gang-raped by approximately two dozen gang members. To subdue her as she struggled against her assailants, she was repeatedly "injected with drugs" until she overdosed and died. Amy had died within hours of being taken to the trailer-clubhouse, and her body had been hastily disposed of in a swamp.

Branch himself had been repeatedly questioned by investigators in the months and years following Amy's disappearance but had always denied any knowledge of her whereabouts; he had also personally spoken with her parents. (Note: In the late 1970s, Branch had informed Susan Billig that her daughter was alive and being held by members of their motorcycle club.) His confession named one individual he alleged participated in Amy's abuse and murder; this individual—incarcerated for murder since May 1974—was interviewed, but denied any involvement.

Emphasizing his belief in Branch's posthumous confession, the lead detective assigned to Amy's case, Jack Calvar, stated numerous details Branch had provided in his deathbed confession matched known facts of the case, some of which had never been publicly disclosed. Nonetheless, he added the caveat: "We will never find a body." (Note: Joshua Billig would later state his family had "come to doubt" the truth of this confession by the early 2000s.)

"When your child is never found ... there is no line you cross that tells you to quit hoping and looking. To give up would be a terrible betrayal."

— Susan Billig, reflecting upon her ongoing and ceaseless efforts to locate her only daughter. December 1995.

== Aftermath ==
The numerous leads Susan Billig received regarding her daughter's disappearance ultimately led her on an unsuccessful nationwide search for Amy. Her efforts saw her speak with death row prisoners and motorcycle gangs and pursue tangible leads in numerous states such as Washington, Oklahoma, and Nevada and—as late as 1992—to travel as far afield as the United Kingdom (Note: This United Kingdom lead sourced from an American private investigator named Virginia Snyder who had received a tip from a British investigator who had himself been approached by an American biker at a Falmouth post office who had informed him he had a young woman he wished to "sell" to him. The biker had informed this informant the young woman—in her thirties—was American, was "mute" and was from Oyster Bay (Amy's birthplace).) in her search for her daughter—ultimately to no avail.

Despite the ongoing setbacks, Susan refused to abandon hope of locating Amy. She and her husband closed their art gallery, sold many of their possessions and moved into a smaller home. Both continued to work to finance their search and both devoted a considerable amount of their free time in their search efforts which, although unsuccessful in their search for Amy, did help several other girls and women abducted and/or abused by motorcycle gangs.

For over two decades, Susan Billig refused to abandon hope that her daughter was still alive, stating in 1984: "Every day I think that tomorrow I'm going to find her .... if she's alive, she knows I'm going to find her. I have made a promise to Amy in my heart. I must find her." Among the theories Susan speculated as to why her daughter had not initiated contact was that Amy had been intimidated by her abductor(s) and was either being held against her will or had been brainwashed.

By 1998, Amy's mother and brother had accepted that she was almost certainly deceased. On March 8, Susan invited several friends and acquaintances who had assisted in her quest to locate Amy to a private memorial service for her daughter at her home. Susan later stated she obtained a "tremendous sense of peace" from the ceremony, adding she and her guests would now attempt to "laugh and be merry because Amy would have wanted us to". One guest, former Herald reporter Edna Buchanan, later reflected upon the cathartic effect the ceremony had upon Amy's mother: "[Susan has] been through more than any other mother I've ever met in all those years of covering missing children and homicides. She looks happier and more relieved than I've seen her look in the last 24 years."

With assistance from freelance correspondent Greg Aunapu, Susan Billig wrote a book detailing the disappearance of her daughter, her ongoing efforts to discover the truth surrounding Amy's disappearance and her determination to locate her child. The book, Without A Trace: The Disappearance Of Amy Billig–A Mother's Search For Justice, was released in September 2001 to critical acclaim.

In October 2002, the Amy Billig Meditation Garden was formally dedicated to Amy's life and legacy. Toward the entrance to the garden, a stone marker with a black plaque stands. The inscription upon the plaque reads in part: Amy Billig "Meditation Garden". For a beautiful Coconut Grove girl who loved this park. This stone marker was designed by Amy's younger brother. The park is located off McFarlane Road in Coconut Grove.

Amy Billig's father, Nathaniel Solomon Billig, died of lung cancer in March 1993; his final words were of his desire to see his daughter before his death. Susan Billig died of a heart attack on June 7, 2005, at the age of 80, following a long battle with lung cancer. Through her son, Joshua, Susan had two granddaughters by the time of her death—one of whom closely resembled her missing aunt. She was later interred in Miami's Graceland Cemetery. Following Susan's death, her family requested public donations be made to the National Center for Missing & Exploited Children.

Two days after his mother's death, Joshua Billig—reflecting upon the lifelong impact his sister's disappearance had upon his mother—remarked: "I don't think [my mother] ever found peace; she took that as a really tough wound right to the grave."

== Media ==
=== Television ===
- The documentary Stalking: A Mother's Nightmare is directly based upon the ordeal of Amy's mother at the hands of stalker Henry Johnson Blair, who subjected Susan Billig to a prolonged campaign of harassment. Written by Lori Siegel and produced by Erik Sorenson and Carolyn Kresky, this documentary was released in 1997.
- The documentary Searching for Amy is directly based upon the disappearance of Amy Billig. Commissioned by the BBC for the documentary series Inside Story, this documentary was released in January 1998 and documents Susan Billig's ongoing search for her daughter.
- A&E commissioned a documentary focusing upon the disappearance of Amy Billig. Broadcast in 1998 as part of the documentary series Investigative Reports, the episode detailed the efforts of Susan Billig and law enforcement to locate Amy alive or deceased.
- The American mystery documentary series Unsolved Mysteries has broadcast two episodes detailing the disappearance of Amy Billig. These episodes were featured in seasons 14 and 17, respectively.

== See also ==
- Cold case
- Crime in Florida
- List of kidnappings
- List of people who disappeared mysteriously: 1910–1990
- National Center for Missing & Exploited Children
- The Doe Network

== Cited works and further reading ==
- Aunapu, Greg; Billig, Susan (2001). Without a Trace: The Disappearance of Amy Billig. A Mother's Search for Justice. New York: HarperCollins. ISBN 978-0-380-81413-8.
- Branson, Jack; Branson, Mary (2011). Delayed Justice: Inside Stories from America's Best Cold Case Investigations. Amherst, New York: Prometheus Books. ISBN 978-1-616-14392-3.
- Buchanan, Edna (2009). The Corpse Had a Familiar Face. New York City: Gallery Books. ISBN 978-1-439-14114-4.
- Collins, James J. (1999). Law Enforcement Policies and Practices Regarding Missing Children and Homeless Youth. United States: Office of Juvenile Justice and Delinquency Prevention. ISBN 978-0-788-18639-4.
- Cooper, Paulette (1994). Reward!. New York City: Pocket Books. ISBN 978-0-671-87020-1.
- Fisher, Bonnie S.; Lab, Steven P. (2010). Encyclopedia of Victimology and Crime Prevention. Los Angeles: Sage Publishing. ISBN 978-1-412-96047-2.
- Greene, Dr. Karen Shalev; Alys, Llian (2016). Missing Persons: A Handbook of Research. London: Routledge. ISBN 978-1-409-46802-8.
- Halber, Deborah (2014). The Skeleton Crew: How Amateur Sleuths Are Solving America's Cold Cases. Cambridge: Cambridge University Press. ISBN 978-1-107-04145-5.
- Katz, Hélèna (2010). Cold Cases: Famous Unsolved Mysteries, Crimes, and Disappearances in America. Santa Barbara: Greenwood Publishing Group. ISBN 978-0-313-37692-4.
- Pettem, Silvia (2017). The Long Term Missing: Hope and Help for Families. Maryland: Rowman & Littlefield. ISBN 978-1-442-25680-4.
- Stewart, Erin (2021). The Missing Among Us: Stories of Missing Persons and Those Left Behind. New South Wales: NewSouth Publishing. ISBN 978-1-742-23679-7.
- Wright, E. Lynne (2012). Myths and Mysteries of Florida: True Stories of the Unsolved. Essex, Connecticut: Globe Pequot Press. ISBN 978-0-762-79104-0.
