= Pagan's Motorcycle Club =

Outlaw motorcycle club in the United States

Pagan's MC
- Abbreviation: Pagan Nation
- Founded: 1959; 67 years ago
- Founder: Lou Dobkin
- Founded at: Prince George's County, Maryland, U.S.
- Type: Outlaw motorcycle club
- Region served: United States and Puerto Rico (Over 100 chapters in 50 U.S. states and 1 U.S. territory)
- Members: 5,000
- National President: Clayton ‘Cletus’ Ayers

Pagan's Motorcycle Club, or simply the Pagans, is an outlaw motorcycle club formed by Lou Dobkin in 1959 in Prince George's County, Maryland, United States. The club rapidly expanded and by 1959, the Pagans, originally clad in blue denim jackets and riding Triumphs, began to evolve along the lines of the stereotypical one percenter motorcycle club.

The Pagans are categorized as an outlaw motorcycle club by the Bureau of Alcohol, Tobacco, Firearms and Explosives (ATF). They are known to fight over territory with the Hells Angels Motorcycle Club (HAMC) and other motorcycle clubs. They are currently active in California, Arizona, Nevada, Delaware, Florida, Kentucky, Maryland, New Jersey, New York, North Carolina, Ohio, Michigan, Indiana, Illinois, Missouri, Oregon, Pennsylvania, Tennessee, South Carolina, Virginia, Massachusetts, Rhode Island, West Virginia, Washington State and Puerto Rico.

== History ==
The Pagans were established in Prince George's County, Maryland, by then-president Lou Dobkin, beginning in 1957 and officially organized in 1958. The club had an initial thirteen founding members. The Pagans started out wearing denim jackets with embroidered insignia instead of the more standard three-piece patches utilized by most outlaw motorcycle gangs (OMG), and riding both American and British motorcycles, Harley-Davidsons and Triumphs. In the 1960s they adopted a formal constitution and formed a governing structure, choosing a national president who was paid the same amount as the United States president, which worked out to a $100,000 salary per year and calling the gesture "a show of class."

They were a fairly non-violent group until 1965. A swelling mass of new members put the Pagans on the path to evolve into an OMG. It was largely a semantic gesture made after they gathered at a motorcycle race in Maryland; the ensuing incident found them branded as "The 1% of motorcyclists who caused problems" in local newspapers. The Pagans claim to have invented and adopted the 1%er patch, referencing the newspaper articles of the time. This 1%er patch was quickly adopted by most other OMGs.

The Pagans, which “have been tied to traditional organized crime, including La Cosa Nostra, in cities like Philadelphia, Pittsburgh, and New York", quickly became dominant in the mid-Atlantic region. They were the only large OMG in that region as well as a large portion of the northeast United States. Their growth under the leadership of John "Satan" Marron saw the Pagans grow to nearly 5,000 members in the early 1970s. Their "Mother Club" is never in a fixed location, but it has been generally located in the northeast. The Pagans' top echelon of leadership must always number 13 members. There are also chapter presidents, with the largest chapter at times located in the Philadelphia area.

Though primarily concentrated in the northeast and mid-Atlantic, the Pagans began expanding into Florida in the 1990s and west, with chapters beyond the Mississippi River. The Pagans have grown slowly through a natural cycle of attrition in the smaller OMGs, the practice of patching over other chapters or entire clubs. The practice of incorporating smaller OMGs was prevalent from the 1970s to the early 1990s.

== Insignia ==
The Pagans MC patch depicts the Norse fire-giant Surtr sitting on burning world, wielding a fire sword, plus the word Pagan's [sic], in red, white and blue. The image of Surtr was taken from an illustration by Jack Kirby in issue 97 of the comic book Journey into Mystery.

Though historically not wearing a bottom rocker, a patch denoting the location of where a one-percenter bike club is based, the Pagan Motorcycle club has since started wearing an "East Coast" insignia on their vests.

Members wear blue denim vests called cuts or cutoffs with club patches, known as colors, on the front and back.

Members of the Pagans' "mother club" wear a distinctive black number "13" patch.

== Membership ==
Pagans have approximately 5,000+ members and more than 100 chapters and are active along the east coast of the United States and more recently the west coast, and Puerto Rico. Chapters are common in Florida, New York, Massachusetts, Rhode Island, New Jersey, Pennsylvania, Connecticut, Alaska, South Carolina, New Mexico, Arizona, Alabama, Georgia, Delaware, Maryland, North Carolina, Virginia, West Virginia, Washington State, Oregon, Puerto Rico and Nevada. The Pagans have a mother club or ruling council which ultimately rules the club.

Members are required to adhere to a number of club bylaws, among which is a rule that dictates members must ride only Harley-Davidson motorcycles. Members are not permitted to quit or retire from the club, and can only leave if they are expelled. Reasons for expulsion include losing one's motorcycle or any piece of club property or paraphernalia, including club "colors".

For decades the Pagans Motorcycle Club had looked north to Canada for possible expansion. It also found the idea of supporting Hells Angels rivals beneficial, such as the Rock Machine Motorcycle Club; a Canadian-based international motorcycle club with chapters all over the world, it has fought several conflicts with the Hells Angels including the Quebec Biker War, the deadliest motorcycle conflict in history. In 2011, dozens of the Pagans traveled to the Canadian province of New Brunswick to meet with the Rock Machine. At the time New Brunswick had little outlaw motorcycle influence. The meeting was to consolidate a friendship and probe the province for expansion. However, in 2018, Pagans member, Andrew "Chef" Glick revealed that the group had abandoned its plans at expansion north. He cited Canada's anti-biker laws but also a large part of the reason was that Canadian Hells Angels are considered particularly violent members of the outlaw biker – or “one percenter” – community, Glick said in an interview.

“In Canada and Australia, that's where the heaviest (toughest) one per centers are,” Glick said. “Being a one per center in Canada, I would say is a little more dangerous than being a one per center in the U.S." New Jersey bikers are tough, but “not near as violent as what I’ve seen and read (about) in Montreal and Toronto.”

== Organization ==
The Pagans organization is headed by a board of directors known as the "mother club", which consists of thirteen senior members who set club policy, administer internal discipline, oversee the opening of new chapters and appoint club presidents and vice presidents.

The club's leadership has traditionally been based in Central Pennsylvania.

== Criminal activities ==
Pagan's MC
- Founded: 1963; 63 years ago
- Founder: Lou Dobkin
- Founding location: Prince George's County, Maryland, United States
- Years active: 1963–present
- Territory: Over 100 chapters in 50 U.S. states and Puerto Rico
- Membership (est.): 5,000
- Activities: Racketeering, drug trafficking, extortion, motorcycle theft, weapons trafficking, burglary, money laundering, prostitution, arson, assault, bombing and murder
- Allies: Aryan Brotherhood; Allegiance MC; Bloods; Crips; Bleeding Lotus MC; Gambino crime family; Genovese crime family; Latin Kings; Mongols Motorcycle Club; Philadelphia crime family; Pittsburgh crime family; Sons of Satan MC; Thunderguards MC; Tribe MC; Warlocks MC
- Rivals: 10th & Oregon Crew; Avengers MC; Bandidos MC; Breed MC; Hells Angels MC; Road Disciples; Sutars Soldiers MC; Outlaws MC

Along with the Bandidos, the Hells Angels and the Outlaws, the Pagans are classified by various law enforcement agencies in the United States as one of the "big four" motorcycle gangs. The Pagans have traditionally been considered the smallest of the "big four". The Pagans are also the only "big four" club which is based solely in the United States and has no presence internationally. The Department of Justice classifies the club as an "outlaw motorcycle gang" (OMG) and contends that Pagans members are involved in the distribution of drugs such as cocaine, methamphetamine, marijuana and PCP, as well as violent crimes directed at rival gangs including arson, assault, bombing, extortion and murder.

The Pagans have been linked to La Cosa Nostra crime families in Philadelphia, Pittsburgh, New York and New Jersey. The club also utilizes puppet clubs, affiliated street gangs and female associates to carry out retail drug distribution. The Pagans have been involved in rivalries with various other motorcycle gangs, most notably a longrunning feud with the Hells Angels.

=== Florida ===
On March 5, 1974, seventeen-year-old Amy Billig disappeared near her home in Coconut Grove, Florida. Billig's fate remained unknown for at least 24 years, until in 1998 Paul Branch, a former Pagans member, revealed in a deathbed confession that on the day of her disappearance she had been abducted, drugged, raped, and murdered. According to Branch, Billig's body was dumped in the surrounding Everglades, though her body has never been found. Billig's case received national media attention, including features on Unsolved Mysteries and America's Most Wanted.

On 15 May 2021, the Pagans got in a bar room fight with locals at Stripes Bar & Grill in Navarre, Florida. Two days later a Rich Urban Bikers (RUBS) motorcycle was set on fire in front of Stripes. The Santa Rosa County Sheriff's Office has been conducting an investigation with at least five Pagans and locals arrested or wanted.

=== Maryland ===
Pagans national sergeant-at-arms Kirby "Bear" Keller was indicted by a federal grand jury in Maryland in 1976 accused of operating a five-state drug ring.

A Pagans MC leader, Jay Carl Wagner, 66, was arrested in Washington County, Maryland, by 60-plus officers from state, local and federal officials with a bomb disposal robot on May 9, 2007, and later charged with possession of a regulated firearm after conviction of a violent crime. Police and agents recovered seven handguns, two alleged explosive devices and 13 rifles. On March 5, 2008, Wagner pleaded guilty to being a felon in possession of a firearm. On August 8, 2008, U.S. District Chief Judge Benson E. Legg sentenced Wagner to 30 months in prison followed by three years of supervised release.

On 6 October 2009, the home of national president David "Bart" Barbeito in Myersville, Maryland was raided by police. He was arrested on firearms charges. In June, 2010 he pleaded guilty to racketeering and other charges. He was sentenced to thirty months' confinement.

=== New Jersey ===
On July 17, 1994, at least eight members of the Pagans showed up at the annual charity picnic fund-raiser organized by Tri-County MC in Hackettstown. The Pagans were there to intimidate local motorcycle clubs into aligning with the Pagans so they would have a larger power base to prevent the Hells Angels from getting established in New Jersey. A fight started and escalated from fists to knives and guns. When it was over, Pagans Glenn Ritchie and Diego Vega had been shot dead; Pagan Ron Locke and Tri-County member William Johnson had gunshot wounds, and Tri-County member Hank Riger had his throat cut.

Pagans member Robert "Hellboy" DeRonde was convicted of the April 24, 2018 beating of Hells Angels member Jeffrey Shank with a baseball bat at a gas station in Newark, and was sentenced to four years in prison in July 2019.

Pagans national president Keith "Conan" Richter was arrested February 26, 2021 after a police stop in East Windsor where a loaded pistol was found in a vehicle in which he was a passenger.

=== New York ===
Two 15-year-old girls who ran away from home in Ogden, Pennsylvania on March 7, 1975 were allegedly picked up by Pagan members and taken to the gang's clubhouse in Queens, where they were held captive and raped by 30 to 40 men for two days. Afterwards, the girls were allegedly relocated to a home in Selden and raped for a further three days. On March 11, 1975, the girls escaped after they were left unguarded and alerted police, who raided the Selden home and arrested six persons, including a woman, on narcotics and rape charges.

On February 23, 2002, 73 Pagans were arrested on Long Island, New York after appearing at an indoor motorcycle and tattoo expo called the Hellraiser Ball. The Pagans had shown up to the event to confront Hells Angels who were at the Ball. Dozens of Pagans rushed the doors of the event and were met with violence by the Hells Angels. Fighting ensued, ten people were wounded, and a Hells Angel shot and killed a Pagans member. Two weeks later, a Pagans-owned tattoo parlor located in South Philadelphia, Pennsylvania was firebombed.

In September 2010, nineteen members of the Pagans were arrested in Rocky Point, New York for allegedly conspiring to murder members of the Hells Angels. Charges also include assault, distribution of cocaine and oxycodone, conspiracy to commit extortion and weapons charges. Two federal ATF agents infiltrated the gang, providing key evidence. One agent eventually served as sergeant-at-arms, the second-highest position in the hierarchy. Gang members were heard plotting to murder members of the Hells Angels using homemade hand grenades.

As many as 70 members of the Pagans and Hells Angels took part in a brawl in the parking lot of the Pennysaver Amphitheater in Farmingville during a classic car show on October 13, 2016. Two people were taken to hospital to be treated for injuries after the bikers were dispersed by police.

=== Pennsylvania ===
Member of the Pagan's Motorcycle Club Anthony "Rocky" LaRocca was the nephew to former Pittsburgh mafia boss John LaRocca and acted as a liaison between the Pagans MC and the LaRocca crime family. In 1973, LaRocca and another member of the Pagans were charged with assaulting an ATF agent, conspiracy, firearms and possession of a silencer. In 1990, LaRocca and Francis "Rick" Ferri were sentenced to life in prison for the murder of John Heatherington. While incarcerated, LaRocca continued to control his cocaine distribution network through his family contacts in organized crime and members of the motorcycle club until he was indicted again and given an additional 20 years.

On March 24, 1974, two Pagan bikers, Michael Watson and George Coons, and a bystander, Thomas Connelly, were injured in a gunfight between Pagans and members of the Breed during the Philadelphia Custom Car, Speed and Cycle Show at the Philadelphia Civic Center.

In 1982, the Pagans attacked members of the Wheels of Soul in Philadelphia in an effort to cease the Wheels of Souls' expansion.

In January 1985, then national vice president of the Pagans Daniel "Danny the Deacon" Zwibel was indicted on RICO charges alongside co-defendants James Burke and Eugene (Nick the Blade) Gesuale who was the infamous “Pittsburgh connection” in the movie Goodfellas.

On March 21, 1985, 42 members and associates of the Pagans and the Iron Coffins, an Erie-based gang, were indicted on drug sales charges. The arrests came after a three-year investigation into the distribution of LSD, PCP, and amphetamines.

On November 19, 1995, Pagan's member Andrew Bobyak, with the assistance of accomplice Bradford Maynard, planted a pipe bomb on a car outside the Blue Moon Tattoo Shop in Easton, which was reportedly owned by Hells Angels bikers. The attack, which was intended as a warning to the shop owners that they were operating in Pagan territory, was unsuccessful as the device failed to explode. Bobyak was convicted in June 1998 of attempted arson, causing or risking a catastrophe, possession of a prohibited offensive weapon, criminal conspiracy and four counts of reckless endangerment. On August 7, 1998, he was sentenced to four-to-ten years in state prison. Maynard also pleaded guilty to his involvement in the case.

On Wednesday, December 9, 2020, a federal grand jury in Pittsburgh indicted 30 members and associates of the Pagans Motorcycle Club with narcotics trafficking and firearm possession. The seizure was of 12 firearms, "significant quantities" of drugs and $28,000 in cash and jewelry. Those charged include: Bill Rana, Eric Armes, Jason Evans, Hasani James, Cody Bonanno, Phillip Bonanno, Dominic Quarture, Mark Stockhausen, Patrick Rizzo, Anthony Peluso, Marissa Botta, David Pietropaolo, Thomas Snelsire, Wayne Webber, Ronald Simak, Anthony Scatena, James Stewart, Dorin Duncan, Jeffrey Kushik, Gary Hairston, Darian Wofford, Stephanie Zilka, Misty Walker, Richard White, Randy Camacho, Damian Cherepko, Brandon Hulboy, James Crivella, Seaira Collins and Jessica Taranto. As part of the investigation the FBI agents tapped 10 phones.

In 2005, Pagans allegedly opened fire on and killed the vice-president of the Hells Angels' Philadelphia chapter as he was driving his truck on the Schuylkill Expressway. Later that year, the Hells Angels closed their Philadelphia chapter.

On April 8, 2022, Pagans associate Jason Evans was sentenced to 57 months for his role in a large-scale operation trafficking drugs in western Pennsylvania and Ohio, federal prosecutors announced. Prosecutors said Evans was a close associate of a "fully patched" Pagans Motorcycle Club member of the Pittsburgh chapter and served as an "enforcer."

On June 7, 2021, the vice president of a chapter in Pittsburgh, Patrick Rizzo, pleaded guilty before United States District Judge Robert J. Colville to illegal firearms possession.

=== Rhode Island ===
In 2018, 49 people, some members of the Pagans MC, were arrested in the largest bust in Rhode Island history. The seizure of 53 illegal guns, including a rocket launcher, and a "large quantity" of marijuana, crack, cocaine, and heroin was the end results of 12-month investigation conducted by members of the Rhode Island State Police Special Investigations Unit with assistance from the Rhode Island Attorney General's office, ATF, and FBI.

=== West Virginia ===
The Pagan's have chapters in Charleston and Fairmont, and are affiliated with the Barbarians, a local motorcycle gang.

=== Multi-state ===
In 2009, 55 Pagans members and associates were arrested from West Virginia, Kentucky, Virginia, Pennsylvania, New York, New Jersey, Delaware and Florida. Charges range from attempted murder and kidnapping to drug dealing and conspiracy. So far, seven defendants in the case have pleaded guilty.
