= Bobby Simon =

American outlaw biker and murderer (1954–1999)

Robert Simon
- Simon in court on November 16, 1995
- Born: Robert Ronald Simon; September 4, 1950; Darby, Pennsylvania, U.S.
- Died: September 7, 1999 (aged 49); New Jersey State Prison, Trenton, New Jersey, U.S.
- Cause of death: Homicide
- Other name: "Mudman"
- Occupations: Outlaw biker, gangster
- Allegiance: Warlocks MC
- Convictions: Pennsylvania; Second degree murder New Jersey; Murder
- Penalty: Pennsylvania; 10 to 20 years imprisonment New Jersey; Death

Details
- Victims: Beth Dusenberg; Unidentified prisoner at SCI Pittsburgh (alleged); Ippolito Gonzalez

Robert Ronald "Mudman" Simon (September 4, 1950 – September 7, 1999), also known as Bobby Simon, was an American white supremacist, outlaw biker, convicted murderer and member of the Pennsylvania-based Warlocks Motorcycle Club. He had formerly been sentenced to death by the state of New Jersey on May 6, 1995, for his part in the fatal shooting of Franklin Township police sergeant Ippolito Gonzalez. However, he was ultimately beaten to death at New Jersey State Prison by a fellow death row inmate before he could be executed.

== Early life and criminal career ==
Robert Ronald Simon was born on September 4, 1951, in Darby, Delaware County, Pennsylvania. His criminal wrongdoings reportedly began as early as age 8. Additionally, Simon was placed into juvenile detention on at least two separate occasions.

Throughout his youth, Simon was a member of an Upper Darby street gang known as the Warlords. The Warlords would eventually merge with another group from Darby to create the Warlocks Motorcycle Club, also referred to as the Philly Warlocks. Founded in 1967, the Warlocks are self-described as a "one-percenter" outlaw motorcycle club and are designated as a violent criminal organization by law enforcement. Although the club was predominately based within their founding location of Philadelphia as well as other parts of Pennsylvania, they also maintained a chapter within New Jersey. Being a member of the gang was such a substantial part of Simon's life to the point where he would even tout his religion as "Warlock". He was said to have held the club title of "enforcer", and was utilized by his fellow Warlock co-founders to intimidate the club's rivals.

The Warlocks menaced the state of Pennsylvania during the 1970s, and Simon was often described as an ill-tempered and especially dangerous member by those who knew and encountered him. At various points in his career as a hardened outlaw biker, Simon burned down a store on the Ocean City, New Jersey boardwalk and committed armed robbery. A frequent user of drugs and alcohol, he went by the club moniker "Mudman" as well as informal nickname of "Bobby Simon". At one point, Simon had a spider-web tattooed onto his elbow, which was rumored to signify he had murdered someone.

In 1982, Simon was convicted for the 1974 second degree murder of his 19-year-old girlfriend, Beth Smith Dusenberg, who had refused to engage in group sex with him and other members of the Warlocks. According to his fellow Warlock bikers, Simon talked about having sexual intercourse with Dusenberg's mummified corpse after he buried it in a water-filled strip mine near Hazleton and even hoped to decorate his jail cell with physical photographs of such evidence. John Lavelle, the Judge who handled Simon's trial, stated that dozens of Warlocks bikers would circle the courthouse on their motorcycles each day in during 1995 in an attempt to intimidate the jurors – quite possibly the reason behind his conviction for second-degree murder instead of first-degree murder.

Simon subsequently received a 10-to-20 year sentence for the homicide and was initially housed at State Correctional Institution – Graterford, but later transferred. Throughout his prison tenure, he received a total of 49 misconducts, which included drug trafficking in addition to drug use. Simon was also suspected of murdering an inmate at State Correctional Institution – Pittsburgh during his incarceration period. However, he was acquitted on the grounds of self-defense.

On January 21, 1993, the Pennsylvania Board of Probation and Parole (PBPP) denied a parole application they received from Simon citing his high risk of continued involvement with the Philly Warlocks along with his need for substance abuse treatment. Despite this, he was classified as merely a "low risk" on parole assessment documents.

After a total three parole rejections, Simon was recommended for parole in November 1994 by a PBPP hearing examiner under the conditioned that he abstain from alcohol and avoid contact with the Warlocks Motorcycle Club. Suspiciously, it is known that one of the club's members began to make arrangements for Simon's living arrangements even before Simon's parole was approved.

Simon was paroled in February 1995, having served a total of 12 1/2 years of prison time. With approval from the New Jersey parole board, he settled at Black Horse RV Trailer Park in Williamstown, New Jersey when released. The property was owned by Marianne Mihalick, who lived with her daughter right across from Simon's trailer home at 3944 South Black Horse Pike. As claimed by Mihalick, they both had been unaware of Simon's homicidal history as he misled them to believing he was just a reformed drug dealer.

Unbeknownst to the parole board's officials, the Warlocks Motorcycle Club had quite the presence within the area, which was even regarded to be a "stronghold" for the biker gang. Furthermore, Simon's trailer home residence was only a few feet from a bar known to be frequented by Warlocks bikers. Simon continued to use drugs and associate with the Warlocks MC, in violation of his parole conditions.

== Killing of Ippolito Gonzalez ==
On May 6, 1995, Robert Simon along with the vice president of the Warlocks' South Jersey chapter, Charles "Shovel" Staples, were both sitting in a car in Franklin Township, Gloucester County, New Jersey when they were pulled over by 15-year Franklin Township police veteran Ippolito "Lee" Gonzalez as part of a routine traffic stop. Earlier that day, a nearby Environmental Heating building had been burglarized and the vehicle occupied by both men was situated within the vicinity.

Sgt. Gonzalez exited his patrol cruiser and proceeded to question the vehicle's occupants. While examining Simon's Social Security Card and Staples' driver's license, he requested for backup on his police radio. After doing so, one of the two Warlock bikers shot Gonzalez a total of two times. The first bullet passed through the side of his neck, knocking the officer to the ground. The second and final gunshot entered Gonzalez's skull behind his right ear, lodging itself within his brain.

In a haste, Staples immediately drove himself and Simon away from the area but were soon pursued by nearby police officers who had heard the two gunshots on Sgt. Gonzalez's radio request for backup. At an eventual point during the chase, Staples managed to lose control over the car and crashed it into a guardrail. Simon promptly departed from the vehicle's passenger side and attempted to flee the area on foot whilst aiming his gun at one of the responding police officers who was ordering him to halt. After refusing to abide the warning, the officer shot Simon in the leg which caused him to flip over the guardrail and surrender to the authorities thereafter. Simon and Staples were then taken into police custody. Evidence collected from the car confirmed that the two gang members were, in fact, the ones who had robbed Environmental Heating building.

Franklin Township police sergeant Ippolito Gonzalez died the following day via the gunshot wounds sustained from the incident. A firearms expert would later testify that the weapon found near Simon when during his apprehension was the same one used to kill Gonzalez. Despite pressure from his fellow Warlocks, Simon eventually confessed to the crime and, as a result, was sentenced to death by the State of New Jersey in April 1997.

== Murder ==
According to some reports, Simon had a reputation for taunting fellow inmates at New Jersey State Prison, and apparently targeted a convict named Ambrose Harris, who had been on death row for kidnapping and killing 22-year-old artist Kristin Huggins in 1992. Harris and Simon had been assigned to side-by-side cells in the facility's capital sentence unit.

On September 7, 1999, a reported fistfight broke out between Harris and Simon while the pair were in one of the prison recreational areas. Harris repeatedly kicked and stomped Simon before jumping from a table's stainless steel stool and landing on his head, fatally crushing Simon's skull. Harris was charged with murder, but acquitted on the grounds of self-defense. He later died in 2020.
