= Straight Satans Motorcycle Club =

American outlaw motorcycle gang

Straight Satans MC
- Founded: July of 1959
- Allies: Manson Family; Mongols MC; Night Riders MC; Hells Angels MC
- Rivals: Satan's Slaves MC; Hangmen MC

The Straight Satans Motorcycle Club was a "one-percenter" outlaw motorcycle gang based in Southern California. Founded in the late 1950s, it was among the earliest outlaw motorcycle clubs to emerge in the Los Angeles area. Though relatively small in size, the club gained notoriety for its association with the Manson Family during the late 1960s, particularly in the period surrounding the Tate–LaBianca murders.

== History ==
The Straight Satans were established in July 1959 at the Webb bar in Santa Monica, California, by three bikers known as Father Bill, Little Jerry, and Glick. According to later accounts from Father Bill, the club's rapid growth and increasingly lawless behavior led him to sever ties with the organization by the early 1960s. Unlike larger outlaw motorcycle clubs such as the Hells Angels or the Mongols, the Straight Satans remained a localized group without chapters beyond their original base. Their activities were concentrated in the Los Angeles area, and they never expanded to a national or international scale. Despite their limited reach, the club developed a reputation for its rebellious culture and occasional entanglement in violent or criminal behavior.

"Mother Ruthe", also known as Ruthe Starke, was a prominent and somewhat enigmatic figure associated with the Straight Satans Motorcycle Club during its early years. Described as a matriarchal presence within the outlaw biker scene, she was not a biker herself but acted as a caretaker, confidante, and surrogate maternal figure to many club members. Based in Los Angeles, Mother Ruthe opened her home to bikers in need of shelter, food, or emotional support, and her residence became an informal gathering place for the Straight Satans and other fringe groups. Her nurturing demeanor stood in stark contrast to the club’s violent and chaotic image, and many members credited her with providing a rare source of stability in their otherwise turbulent lives. While not directly involved in the club's criminal activities, her close proximity to its members and her influence within their social circle made her a notable figure in the subculture.

== Criminal incidents ==
In August 1972, members of several Southern California motorcycle gangs—including the Straight Satans, the Glendale chapter of the Mongols, the San Bernardino chapter of the Hells Angels, and Night Riders from Glendale—were implicated in the sexual assault of a 15-year-old girl. The incident contributed to a broader perception of outlaw motorcycle clubs as criminal enterprises during this era.

The Straight Satans are perhaps most infamous for their connection to the Manson Family cult. Members of the club, including its treasurer, Danny DeCarlo, frequently visited the Family’s base at Spahn Ranch in Los Angeles County, California. The Straight Satans were drawn to the compound primarily due to its hedonistic atmosphere and the presence of Charles Manson’s followers, particularly the women.

Danny DeCarlo, a Canadian-born member with extensive knowledge of firearms, served as both the treasurer and weapons specialist for the Straight Satans. He became closely associated with Charles Manson and was the only Straight Satans member to take up full-time residence at Spahn Ranch. DeCarlo was responsible for maintaining the group's collection of weapons, which included firearms and knives, and played a key role in arming the Manson Family during its descent into violence.

Charles Manson saw strategic value in aligning with the Straight Satans. He hoped to recruit them as a kind of paramilitary force to protect the Family and enforce his directives. Manson viewed the club as a potential "military wing" of his cult, capable of intimidating rivals and defending the Spahn Ranch compound.

Bobby Beausoleil, an aspiring musician and actor with ties to the countercultural scene in Los Angeles, also had connections to both the Manson Family and outlaw motorcycle clubs, including the Straight Satans. Though not a patched member of the Straight Satans, Beausoleil was known to associate with members of the club through his interactions with Charles Manson and others at Spahn Ranch. His involvement with Manson deepened over time, culminating in his participation in the murder of Gary Hinman in July 1969—a killing that preceded the more infamous Tate–LaBianca murders. Beausoleil later claimed that the killing was, in part, motivated by a drug deal gone wrong involving members of the Straight Satans and the Manson Family. According to some accounts, Manson had promised the bikers a supply of mescaline obtained from Hinman, which turned out to be of poor quality. When the bikers threatened retaliation, Manson allegedly sent Beausoleil and others to confront Hinman, leading to the violent altercation that ended in Hinman's death. Beausoleil was arrested shortly afterward and later convicted of first-degree murder, receiving a life sentence.

== Legacy ==
Although the Straight Satans never achieved the prominence or longevity of other outlaw motorcycle clubs, their brief but intense involvement with the Manson Family cemented their place in the history of American counterculture and true crime. The club eventually faded from public view, and little is known about its later years or whether it continued to operate beyond the 1970s.
