= Brother Speed Motorcycle Club =

American outlaw motorcycle club

Brother Speed MC
- Abbreviation: BSMC
- Founded: May 1969; 57 years ago
- Founded at: Boise, Idaho, United States
- Type: Outlaw motorcycle club
- Region served: Northwestern United States
- Website: brotherspeedmc.com

The Brother Speed Motorcycle Club is an American outlaw motorcycle club that was formed in Boise, Idaho in 1969, and is active in Idaho, Washington, and Oregon. It once was referred to by the Oregon Department of Justice as one of the nine "motorcycle clubs" active in their state.

== History ==
Brother Speed was established by a group of high school friends who enjoyed riding together. The friends noticed an increase in motorcycles in the area and decided to run a newspaper ad looking for anyone interested in starting a club. A meeting was organized with approximately 20 people attending. A few weeks after the first meeting, the group came up with the name, "Brother Speed". The club's center patch is a winged skull with a cap, goggles, and scarf. Brother Speed's colors are black and gold.

The Brother Speed has allegedly associated with the Hells Angels, the Outsiders, and the Devils Breed in order to acquire precursor chemicals used in the manufacture of methamphetamine. The Brother Speed chapter in Reno, Nevada, in collusion with the Hells Angels' Sacramento, California chapter and California Nomads chapter, has reportedly used twin-engine airplanes to transport drugs between northern California and Nevada. The Brothers Speed in Idaho have allegedly been involved in sending methamphetamine, sealed inside the frames of motorcycles, to the Rebels in Sydney, Australia.

Fearing that their operations would be taken over by the Hells Angels, the Brother Speed strengthened by beginning an alliance with the Bandidos of Texas in the early 1990s. The club has purchased illegal weapons from members of Aryan Nations in northern Idaho. Brother Speed members have also assembled fully-automatic stun guns after ordering parts.

In 2006, a member was sentenced to 21 years for distributing methamphetamine and lying about it in court. In 2005, federal and local officers raided the then Brother Speed clubhouse where it was believed many of the meth transactions had occurred. It was believed that the member was a major leader in a large meth trafficking ring.

On 19 September 2009, up to 26 motorcycles ridden by members of the Brother Speed motorcycle club were involved in a motorcycle crash on Interstate 5 near Wilsonville, Oregon. The crash inflicted serious injuries on two of the bikers, sent ten to the hospital, and closed off that portion of I-5 for four hours. One of the critically injured Brother Speed members improved and was released from the hospital; the other died as a result of injuries sustained in the crash.

In April 2012, two members of Brother Speed were arrested on suspicion of harassment, menacing, reckless driving and recklessly endangering another person. After chasing a car in Eugene, Oregon, they were reportedly hitting the car with their hands and a metal hook attached to a leather leash. In May 2012, five of the Idaho Falls members of Brother Speed, attacked two members of Pocatello's Empties motorcycle club at a gathering for a child who was suffering from cancer, nearly 400 bikers having gathered that Saturday to grant the child's wish to participate in a motorcycle rally.

In October 2026, members of Brother Speed shut down Interstate 84 near Caldwell, Idaho for multiple hours during a memorial ride crash involving 25+ motorcycles and 7 passenger cars, in a similar incident to the group's I-5 crash in 2009. No deaths occurred although multiple injuries were reported.

== Charitable events ==
Brother Speed Motorcycle Club has participated in various charitable activities, particularly during the holiday season. The club has organized annual events aimed at providing support to children and families in need throughout the Pacific Northwest.

In 2017, the club participated in a Mini-Cassia Christmas Council initiative in Idaho's Mini-Cassia region, purchasing over $31,000 worth of toys, food, and blankets for approximately 400 families, along with a $10,000 cash donation. In 2019, during the club’s 23rd annual toy-buy event, members spent over $30,000 on toys at a Walmart in Burley. As recently as 2022, local media reported that many toys distributed by the Christmas Council were purchased through Brother Speed's annual efforts.

In Hillsboro, Oregon, Brother Speed members also participated in a holiday toy run, delivering trailers of toys to families in need.

== See also ==
- List of outlaw motorcycle clubs
