= Murder of Ippolito Gonzalez =

1995 murder in Franklinville, New Jersey

Ippolito Gonzalez
- Ippolito Gonzalez
- Born: July 26, 1954; Landisville, New Jersey, U.S.
- Died: May 6, 1995 (aged 40); Franklinville, New Jersey, U.S.
- Police career
- Country: United States of America
- Allegiance: State of New Jersey

Ippolito "Lee" Gonzalez (July 26, 1954 – May 6, 1995) was an American Police Sergeant with the police department of Franklin Township, Gloucester County, New Jersey who was fatally shot multiple times during a routine traffic stop in Franklinville on May 6, 1995. Two Warlocks Motorcycle Club members, Robert Simon and Charles Staples, were tried and convicted for Gonzalez's murder, the former being sentenced to death and later murdered while on death row.

== Victim ==
Ippolito Gonzalez was born on July 26, 1954, in Landisville, New Jersey, one of six children who grew up on a migrant farm. He graduated from Vineland High School in Vineland, New Jersey, and later from the Camden County Police Academy in 1975. During his law enforcement career, Gonzalez received numerous awards. At the time of his death, Gonzalez was 40 years old and had served in law enforcement for 20 years.

== Murder ==
On the night of May 6, 1995, at around 10:25 p.m., Gonzalez was nearly at the end of his shift, when he pulled over a suspicious looking vehicle. The vehicle was occupied by Robert Simon, nicknamed "Mudman", and Charles Staples, nicknamed "Shovel", two Warlocks Motorcycle Club members who had committed a burglary minutes before. Upon pulling over the two, Simon drew his gun and shot Gonzalez in the neck, knocking him down, and fired once again at Gonzalez's head, killing him. Shortly before the final blast, Gonzalez had radioed in for backup. The resulting police chase that followed ended with Staples losing control of the vehicle and crashing and attempting to run on foot. An officer fired three shots at both, striking Simon in the leg, resulting in him surrendering to police. Staples was arrested not long after.

== Trial ==
More than 1,000 people attended Gonzalez's funeral. Simon and Staples were indicted on charges of burglary, multiple firearm offenses, and later both were charged with felony murder due to the prosecution not yet knowing who pulled the trigger. During the trial, the prosecution brought up Simon's prior criminal record; He had been convicted of killing 19-year-old Beth Dusenberg in Pennsylvania in 1974, after she allegedly refused to have sex with fellow Warlock members. While in prison, he also stabbed fellow inmate Jose Gonzalez. He was paroled in 1994, after which he began a friendship with Charles Staples, the vice president for the South Jersey Warlocks. During this time, Simon was unemployed, and the two struggled financially.

At the end of their trial, Simon and Staples were found guilty of felony murder. At the same time, the court accepted a guilty plea Simon took; Staples was sentenced to 30-years to life in prison, while Simon was ultimately sentenced to death. After his sentence, Simon came forward and claimed that his plea hearing failed to establish that he was the shooter.

== Aftermath ==
On September 7, 1999, Simon was stomped to death by fellow death row inmate Ambrose Harris. Harris had been sentenced to death in 1996 for the 1992 murder of Kristin Huggins, a 22-year-old art student who was visiting from Philadelphia. Harris was brought to trial for Simon's death, but his defense was able to convince the jury that the killing was in self-defense, and he was acquitted in 2001. Harris' original death sentence was later commuted to life imprisonment after New Jersey abolished the death penalty in 2007. He died in prison in 2020.

As of 2022, Staples is still serving his sentence at South Woods State Prison. His latest parole eligibility date is set for May 5, 2025. He maintains that he did not know Simon was going to shoot and kill Gonzalez, and in a recent interview described himself as mainly just a witness, not an accomplice.

== See also ==
- List of law enforcement officers killed in the line of duty in the United States
