= Median Empire Motorcycle Club =

- Founded: 2011
- Founded at: Cologne, Germany
- Type: Outlaw motorcycle club
- Region served: Germany; United Arab Emirates; Sweden
- President: Kawan Azad

Median Empire is a German outlaw motorcycle club. It was founded in 2011 in Cologne and has a predominantly Kurdish membership.

== History ==
The Median Empire MC was formed on November 11, 2011, after the Cologne chapter of the Mongols decided to split from the organization and form their own club. The name refers to the ancient Median Empire. The club's membership is mostly Kurdish, with some German members. Its symbols are a helmeted skull and the number 135. 135 stands for the thirteenth (M) and the fifth (E) letter of the alphabet (ME = Median Empire). The club also uses the acronym/motto E.F.F.E which stands for "Empire Forever Forever Empire".

Median Empire is currently led by Kawan Azad, a former member of the Mongols. Azad was born in 1982 in Iranian Kurdistan, and moved to Germany at age 9. His parents were active members of the Communist Party of Iran and Azad himself was previously a member of the Kurdistan Workers' Party.

Like many outlaw motorcycle clubs, Median Empire claims to have no involvement in organized crime. The club claims to earn income from membership fees and by providing bouncers at nightclubs.

Median Empire is reported to have chapters in Cologne, Bonn, Nuremberg, Karlsruhe, Düsseldorf, Viersen, and Duisburg. Aside from Germany, the club is reported to have a chapter in Dubai, United Arab Emirates. According to the club's website, they are also in the process of establishing a chapter in Russia. Median Empire has established a support club, known as the Guerrilleros, with chapters in both Germany and Sweden (Gothenburg and Trollhättan).

In 2012, there were tensions between Median Empire and the Hells Angels in the Cologne area. After a Hells Angels owned property was vandalized with spray paint, 30 Hells Angels members travelled to a shisa bar owned by a Median Empire president Kawan Azad. Median Empire denied any involvement in the vandalism, and local police later forced both groups to disperse. Shortly after the confrontation, the shisha bar was fired upon several times with a shotgun. A 38-year-old man, Olaf L., was charged with two counts of attempted murder, as the bar manager and his girlfriend were present during the attack. He denied any connection to the Hells Angels. Later in 2012, the Federal Office for the Protection of the Constitution, Germany's domestic intelligence agency, confirmed it was monitoring the expansion of Median Empire.

In 2014, it was reported that members of Median Empire had travelled to Syria to support the Kurdish Peshmerga fighting against ISIS in the Syrian Civil War. The club also distributed aid to Kurdish and Syrian refugees displaced by the fighting.

In 2016, a Median Empire member was killed during a SEK raid on his Dortmund apartment. The man was known to police as a local pimp and had failed to appear in court after being sentenced to 2.5 years in prison for fraud.
