= Red Death =

The Red Death may refer to:

- Red Death, a fictional disease in Osmosis Jones
- Red Death, a fictional dragon in the 2010 film How to Train Your Dragon
- Masque of the Red Death (Ravenloft), a campaign setting for the Dungeons & Dragons role-playing game
- The Red Death, a New York death metal band
- Red Death, a character on the animated television series The Venture Bros
- Red Death, a version of the DC Comics character Batman from an alternate Earth
- Doxorubicin, a chemotherapy medication due to its red color and side effects

== See also ==
- The Masque of the Red Death (disambiguation)
