= Red skull =

Red skull or red skulls, may refer to:

== Fictional characters ==
- Red Skull, a Marvel Comics supervillain character
  - Red Skull (Marvel Cinematic Universe), the 21st-century live-action movie version of the comic book character
- The Red Skull, the antagonist of a 1984 episode of The New Scooby-Doo Mysteries, "Happy Birthday, Scooby-Doo"
- Red Skull (Monkey Island), a fictional cannibal from the videogame Monkey Island
- Red Skulls, an airpirate faction in the videogame Crimson Skies: High Road to Revenge

== Other uses ==
- Red Skull (1982 painting), a painting by Jean-Michel Basquiat
- Red Skulls Motorcycle Club, an outlaw motorcycle club that is not fullpatch Hells Angels; see List of Hells Angels support clubs
- Jerusalem cricket, also known as the red-skull bug
