= The Masque of the Red Death (disambiguation) =

"The Masque of the Red Death" is an 1842 short story by Edgar Allan Poe.

The Masque of the Red Death may also refer to:

- The Masque of the Red Death (1964 film), a 1964 film adapted from the short story by Poe, directed by Roger Corman
- Masque of the Red Death (1989 film), a remake of Corman's 1964 film, directed by Larry Brand and produced by Roger Corman
- Masque of the Red Death (1989 Alan Birkinshaw film), a slasher movie directed by Alan Birkinshaw
- Masque of the Red Death (album), a 1988 anthology album by Diamanda Galás
- The Masque of the Red Death (play), a 2007 promenade performance play
- Masque of the Red Death (Ravenloft), a Dungeons & Dragons campaign setting
- Masque of the Red Death, a short story by Cory Doctorow, published in his 2019 collection Radicalized

== See also ==
- Red Death (disambiguation)
