= List of Yashahime episodes =

Key visual for the series

Yashahime: Princess Half-Demon is a Japanese anime television series produced by Sunrise. It is a sequel to the Inuyasha anime series, which itself is based on Rumiko Takahashi's manga series Inuyasha. The series was first announced in May 2020, and is directed by Teruo Sato, with all characters designed by Takahashi. Most of the main cast and staff from the series returned, with Katsuyuki Sumisawaas a screenwriter, Yoshihito Hishinuma in charge of the anime character designs, and Kaoru Wada composed the music. The series aired from October 3, 2020, to March 20, 2021, on Yomiuri TV and Nippon TV. The series follows the trio of half-demon princesses (teenage daughters of Sesshomaru and Rin, Inuyasha and Kagome Higurashi) on a journey to protect seven magical rainbow pearls from villainous siblings and lesser adversaries. On March 20, 2021, a second season titled Yashahime: Princess Half-Demon - The Second Act, was announced for production after the first season. It aired from October 2, 2021, to March 26, 2022.

Viz Media announced it had acquired the rights to digital streaming, electronic sell-through (EST), and home video releases of the series for North and Latin American territories. Medialink also has announced that it has the rights to the series in Southeast Asian and South Asian territories. Viz Media streamed the series on Crunchyroll, Funimation, and Hulu. On October 26, 2020, Funimation announced a partnership with Viz Media to release an American English dub of the series, with most of the English cast of Inuyasha reprising their roles. The English dub of the series began broadcast on Adult Swim's Toonami programming block on June 27, 2021.

== Series overview ==
Season	Episodes	Originally released	
Season	Episodes	First released	Last released
1	24	October 3, 2020	March 20, 2021
2	24	October 2, 2021	March 26, 2022

== Episode list ==
=== Season 1 (2020–21) ===
No. overall	No. in season	Title (Note: All English episode titles taken from Crunchyroll.)	Directed by	Written by	Storyboarded by	Original release date	English air date	Ref.
1	1	"Inuyasha: Since Then"; Transliteration: "Are kara no Inuyasha" (Japanese: あれからの犬夜叉)	Teruo Satō	Katsuyuki Sumisawa	Teruo Satō	October 3, 2020	June 27, 2021	
2	2	"The Three Princesses"; Transliteration: "Sanbiki no Hime" (Japanese: 三匹の姫)	Katsuya Ōshima	Katsuyuki Sumisawa	Teruo Satō	October 10, 2020	July 4, 2021	
3	3	"The Dream Butterfly"; Transliteration: "Yume no Kochō" (Japanese: 夢の胡蝶)	Imugahi	Katsuyuki Sumisawa	Atsuo Tobe	October 17, 2020	July 11, 2021	
4	4	"The Gateway to the Past"; Transliteration: "Kako e no Tobira" (Japanese: 過去への扉)	Ryūta Kawahara	Katsuyuki Sumisawa	Teruo Satō	October 24, 2020	July 18, 2021	
5	5	"Jakotsumaru of the Red Bone Palace"; Transliteration: "Aka Hone Goten no Jakotsumaru" (Japanese: 赤骨御殿の若骨丸)	Sōta Yokote	Katsuyuki Sumisawa	Kazuo Terada	October 31, 2020	July 25, 2021	
6	6	"The Cat Juan at the Old Temple"; Transliteration: "Furudera no Neko Juan" (Japanese: 古寺の猫寿庵)	Yūki Morita	Katsuhiko Chiba	Teruo Satō	November 7, 2020	August 1, 2021	
7	7	"Meeting through an Apple"; Transliteration: "Ringo no Deai" (Japanese: 林檎の出会い)	Tomo Ōkubo	Katsuyuki Sumisawa	Takahiro Ōkawa	November 14, 2020	August 15, 2021	
8	8	"The Dream Gazing Trap"; Transliteration: "Yume Hiraki no Wana" (Japanese: 夢ひらきの罠)	Megumi Yamamoto	Katsuyuki Sumisawa	Megumi Yamamoto	November 21, 2020	August 22, 2021	
9	9	"Meifuku, the Meioju"; Transliteration: "Meiōjū no Meifuku" (Japanese: 冥王獣の冥福)	Mariachi HugYuk	Katsuhiko Chiba	Mariachi HugYuk	November 28, 2020	August 29, 2021	
10	10	"The Gold and Silver Rainbow Pearls"; Transliteration: "Kin to Gin no Nijiiro Shinju" (Japanese: 金と銀の虹色真珠)	Katsuya Ōshima	Junki Takegami	Katsuya Ōshima	December 5, 2020	September 5, 2021	
11	11	"Curse of the Man-Eating Pond"; Transliteration: "Hito Kui-numa no Noroi" (Japanese: 人喰い沼の呪い)	Ayumu Ono	Hiroko Kanasugi	Ayumu Ono	December 12, 2020	September 12, 2021	
12	12	"Night of the New Moon and the Black-haired Towa"; Transliteration: "Saku no Yoru, Kurokami no Towa" (Japanese: 朔の夜、黒髪のとわ)	Yōji Satō, Kento Matsui	Junki Takegami, Katsuyuki Sumisawa	Kazuo Terada	December 19, 2020	September 19, 2021	
13	13	"The Delicious Feudal Monks"; Transliteration: "Sengoku Oishii Hōshi" (Japanese: 戦国おいしい法師)	Kento Nakagomi	Katsuhiko Chiba	Katsumi Ono	December 26, 2020	September 26, 2021	
14	14	"The One Behind the Forest Fire"; Transliteration: "Mori o Yaita Kuromaku" (Japanese: 森を焼いた黒幕)	Ryō Kodama	Hiroko Kanasugi	Yoshiyuki Kaneko	January 9, 2021	October 3, 2021	
15	15	"Farewell Under the Lunar Eclipse"; Transliteration: "Gesshoku, Unmei no Sekibetsu" (Japanese: 月蝕、運命の惜別)	Akira Toba	Katsuyuki Sumisawa	Kenji Kodama	January 16, 2021	October 10, 2021	
16	16	"Double-Edged Moroha"; Transliteration: "Moroha no Yaiba" (Japanese: もろはの刃)	Ryūta Kawahara	Katsuyuki Sumisawa	Katsumi Ono	January 23, 2021	November 7, 2021	
17	17	"Trap of the Two Perils"; Transliteration: "Ni Kyō no Wana" (Japanese: 二凶の罠)	Sayaka Oda	Katsuhiko Chiba	Kō Matsuo	January 30, 2021	November 14, 2021	
18	18	"Sesshomaru and Kirinmaru"; Transliteration: "Sesshōmaru to Kirinmaru" (Japanese: 殺生丸と麒麟丸)	Akira Toba	Katsuhiko Chiba	Kazuo Terada	February 6, 2021	November 21, 2021	
19	19	"Princess Aiya's Beniyasha Hunting"; Transliteration: "Aiya Hime no Beniyasha Taiji" (Japanese: 愛矢姫の紅夜叉退治)	Yōji Satō, Kento Matsui	Hiroko Kanasugi	Toshihiko Masuda	February 13, 2021	November 21, 2021	
20	20	"The Hidden Village for Half Demons"; Transliteration: "Han'yō no Kakurezato" (Japanese: 半妖の隠れ里)	Kento Nakagomi	Katsuhiko Chiba	Katsumi Ono	February 20, 2021	November 28, 2021	
21	21	"Secret of the Rainbow Pearls"; Transliteration: "Nijiiro Shinju no Himitsu" (Japanese: 虹色真珠の秘密)	Katsuya Ōshima	Katsuyuki Sumisawa	Katsuya Ōshima	February 27, 2021	November 28, 2021	
22	22	"The Stolen Seal"; Transliteration: "Ubawareta Fūin" (Japanese: 奪われた封印)	Ayumu Ono	Katsuyuki Sumisawa	Ayumu Ono	March 6, 2021	December 12, 2021	
23	23	"The Three Princesses Strike Back"; Transliteration: "Sanhime no Gyakushū" (Japanese: 三姫の逆襲)	Teruo Satō	Katsuyuki Sumisawa	Kazuo Terada	March 13, 2021	December 12, 2021	
24	24	"Sesshomaru's Daughter"; Transliteration: "Sesshōmaru no Musume de Aru to Iu Koto" (Japanese: 殺生丸の娘であるということ)	Teruo Satō	Katsuyuki Sumisawa	Teruo Satō, Atsuo Tobe	March 20, 2021	January 2, 2022 (Note: Episode 24 of Yashahime: Princess Half-Demon was originally scheduled to air on Adult Swim on the broadcast night of December 11–12, 2021, but episode 21 was mistakenly reaired in its place.)	

=== Season 2: The Second Act (2021–22) ===
No. overall	No. in season	Title	Directed by	Written by	Storyboarded by	Original release date	English air date	Ref.
25	1	"Wielding the Tenseiga"; Transliteration: "Tenseiga o Motsu to Iu Koto" (Japanese: 天生牙を持つということ)	Akira Toba	Katsuyuki Sumisawa	Masakazu Hishida	October 2, 2021	July 31, 2022	
26	2	"Demon Spirit of the Sea"; Transliteration: "Umi no Yōrei" (Japanese: 海の妖霊)	Kento Nakagomi	Hiroko Kanasugi	Kazuo Terada	October 9, 2021	August 7, 2022	
27	3	"The Silver-Scale Curse"; Transliteration: "Ginrin no Noroi" (Japanese: 銀鱗の呪い)	Katsuya Ōshima	Katsuyuki Sumisawa	Katsuya Ōshima	October 16, 2021	August 14, 2022	
28	4	"The Barrier at Mount Musubi"; Transliteration: "Musubi Yama no Kekkai" (Japanese: 産霊山の結界)	Mitsuhiro Yoneda	Katsuyuki Sumisawa	Mitsuhiro Yoneda	October 23, 2021	August 21, 2022	
29	5	"The Girl Named Rion"; Transliteration: "Rion to Iu Na no Shōjo" (Japanese: りおんという名の少女)	Ayumu Ono	Katsuyuki Sumisawa	Ayumu Ono	October 30, 2021	August 28, 2022	
30	6	"Hisui the Demon Slayer"; Transliteration: "Taijiya Hisui" (Japanese: 退治屋翡翠)	Takashi Mamezuka	Hiroko Kanasugi	Toshihiko Masuda	November 6, 2021	September 4, 2022	
31	7	"Takechiyo's Request"; Transliteration: "Takechiyo no Irai" (Japanese: 竹千代の依頼)	Akira Toba	Katsuyuki Sumisawa	Atsuo Tobe	November 13, 2021	September 11, 2022	
32	8	"Nanahoshi's Mini Galaxy"; Transliteration: "Nanahoshi no Shōginga" (Japanese: 七星の小銀河)	Kento Nakagomi	Katsuyuki Sumisawa	Kazuo Terada	November 20, 2021	September 25, 2022	
33	9	"Mayonaka the Visitor"; Transliteration: "Mayonaka no Hōmonsha" (Japanese: 魔夜中の訪問者)	Hidekazu Hara	Katsuyuki Sumisawa	Hidekazu Hara	November 27, 2021	October 2, 2022	
34	10	"Battle on the New Moon, Part 1"; Transliteration: "Kessen no Saku (Zenpen)" (Japanese: 決戦の朔（前編）)	Kei Umabiki	Katsuyuki Sumisawa	Kei Umabiki	December 4, 2021	October 9, 2022	
35	11	"Battle on the New Moon, Part 2"; Transliteration: "Kessen no Saku (Kōhen)" (Japanese: 決戦の朔（後編）)	Takashi Mamezuka	Katsuyuki Sumisawa	Toshihiko Masuda	December 11, 2021	October 16, 2022	
36	12	"A Place (Not) for Towa"; Transliteration: "Towa ni Nai Basho" (Japanese: 永遠(とわ)にない場所)	Katsuya Ōshima	Katsuyuki Sumisawa	Katsuya Ōshima	December 18, 2021	October 23, 2022	
37	13	"Zero's Wish"; Transliteration: "Zero no Omoi" (Japanese: 是露の想い)	Mitsuhiro Yoneda	Katsuyuki Sumisawa	Mitsuhiro Yoneda	December 25, 2021	November 6, 2022	
38	14	"Kirinmaru of the Dawn"; Transliteration: "Shinonome no Kirinmaru" (Japanese: 東雲の麒麟丸)	Ayumu Ono	Katsuyuki Sumisawa	Ayumu Ono	January 8, 2022	November 13, 2022	
39	15	"Moroha and Family, Together Again"; Transliteration: "Oyako no Saikai" (Japanese: 親子の再会)	Akira Toba	Katsuyuki Sumisawa	Terry	January 15, 2022	November 20, 2022	
40	16	"The Three Princesses Escape"; Transliteration: "Sanhime no Dasshutsu" (Japanese: 三姫の脱出)	Kento Nakagomi	Katsuyuki Sumisawa	Atsuo Tobe	January 22, 2022	December 4, 2022	
41	17	"Akuru's Pinwheel"; Transliteration: "Akuru no Kazaguruma" (Japanese: 阿久留のかざぐるま)	Naoki Kotani	Katsuyuki Sumisawa	Naoki Kotani	January 29, 2022	December 11, 2022	
42	18	"The Collapse of the Windmill of Time"; Transliteration: "Hōkai Suru Toki no Fūsha" (Japanese: 崩壊する時の風車)	Akira Toba	Katsuyuki Sumisawa	Atsuo Tobe, Tetsuji Nakamura, Naoki Kotani	February 5, 2022	December 18, 2022	
43	19	"The Blackout"; Transliteration: "Anten no Sutēji" (Japanese: 暗転の舞台(ステージ))	Mitsuhiro Yoneda	Katsuyuki Sumisawa	Terry	February 12, 2022	January 8, 2023	
44	20	"When the Grim Comet Falls"; Transliteration: "Yōreisei ga Ochiru Toki" (Japanese: 妖霊星が墜ちる時)	Takashi Mamezuka	Katsuyuki Sumisawa	Takashi Mamezuka	February 26, 2022	January 15, 2023	
45	21	"Osamu Kirin's Apparition Conquest"; Transliteration: "Kirin Osamu no Ayakashi Seibatsu" (Japanese: 希林理の妖征伐)	Katsuya Ōshima	Katsuyuki Sumisawa	Katsuya Ōshima	March 5, 2022	January 22, 2023	
46	22	"The Grim Butterfly of Despair"; Transliteration: "Zetsubō no Yōrei Chō" (Japanese: 絶望の妖霊蝶)	Ayumu Ono	Katsuyuki Sumisawa	Masakazu Hishida	March 12, 2022	January 29, 2023	
47	23	"Father and Daughter"; Transliteration: "Chichi to Ko to" (Japanese: 父と娘と)	Masakazu Hishida	Katsuyuki Sumisawa	Atsuo Tobe	March 19, 2022	February 5, 2023	
48	24	"A Never-Ending Future"; Transliteration: "Towa ni Tsuzuku Mirai" (Japanese: 永遠(とわ)に続く未来)	Mitsuhiro Yoneda, Takashi Mamezuka, Ken'ichi Domon	Katsuyuki Sumisawa	Terry, Atsuo Tobe	March 26, 2022	February 5, 2023	
