= Breed Motorcycle Club =

Outlaw Motorcycle Club

Breed MC
- Breed colors
- Founded: 1965
- Founding location: Asbury Park, New Jersey, United States
- Years active: 1965–2006
- Territory: 3 chapters in New Jersey and Pennsylvania
- Membership (est.): 300–400 (1970s); 100 (1990); 40 (2000)
- Activities: Drug trafficking, extortion, theft, witness intimidation, murder, assault
- Rivals: Hells Angels; Pagans; Warlocks

The Breed Motorcycle Club was a one-percenter motorcycle club that was formed in Asbury Park, New Jersey in the United States in 1965. The club disbanded in 2006 after numerous prominent members were indicted on racketeering and drug trafficking charges.

== History ==
The Breed Motorcycle Club was founded by Salvatore DeIulio in Asbury Park, New Jersey, in 1965. The club was originally known as the New Breed, but the full title didn't fit properly on the colors. The Breed patched over the Riverside, New Jersey–based Aces and Eights Motorcycle Club and the Elizabeth, New Jersey–based Branded Motorcycle Club in 1983 Due in parts of the efforts of Jim "Irish" Power who was known as "Irish Prez". He was known for his efforts to expand the club with minimal violence and his desire to make the club more profitable and larger in members. Power's efforts took The Breed to a level of profit and members that made the MC become a large force not to be underestimated or taken lightly by its rival clubs. At its peak in the 1970s, the Breed was the most prominent outlaw motorcycle club in the state and also had chapters in New York, Ohio, Pennsylvania and West Virginia, with a membership of between three- and four-thousand.

=== Conflict with the Angels and Pagans ===
In March 1971, the club engaged in a confrontation with the Hells Angels in Cleveland, Ohio which resulted in the deaths of five people. During the following two decades, the Breed were continuously attacked by the Hells Angels, including a hand grenade attack on the house of the Breed national president in Plainfield, New Jersey. The conflict with the Hells Angels, as well as infighting, law enforcement efforts and a rivalry with the Pagans, led to the Breed decreasing in numbers to approximately nine-hundred members by 1990, and in a reduced territory comprising Bucks County, Pennsylvania, and Central and South Jersey. In 1989, the Breed had two chapters in New Jersey – the mother chapter operating out of Middlesex County and the South Jersey chapter operating out of Riverside run by Jim "Irish" Power with most operations of the club being run out of The White Eagle Bar in Delran, NJ and a Pennsylvania chapter in Bucks County. Membership was estimated at forty in 2000. This number however was greatly underestimated as it was based on arrests that were made rather than the actual number of members estimated to legitimately be closer to five hundred.

The Breed, along with their rival Pagans, became the most prominent distributors of methamphetamine in New Jersey, and were reportedly infamous among outlaw motorcycle clubs due to their propensity for recruiting expelled members of rival clubs as well as for cooperating with law enforcement. The Breed was said to have gone defunct after being dismantled by a law enforcement operation against the club in 2006 which led to the imprisonment of nineteen members for drug trafficking and racketeering. The club was the subject of the 2009 Gangland episode "Evil Breed".

== Organizational structure ==
The Breed Motorcycle Club was led by an executive board, consisting of chapter presidents, which determined club policy. The executive board was ultimately headed by a national president. Each club chapter consisted of a president, vice-president, treasurer, secretary and sergeant-at-arms. Membership of the club was restricted to white males who would first serve a prospecting period before being voted in and awarded their colors. Prospective members were required to carry out illegal activities, such as car theft and armed robbery, and turn over the proceeds of these crimes to the club. In addition to regional chapters, the Breed also operated a nomad chapter, made up of members not bound by geographical location, which served as an elite element within the club.

The club's insignia consisted of a Betsy Ross flag with a Breed banner above. This insignia would be sewn onto the back of a sleeveless denim cutoff jacket, which was forbidden from being washed. Various other patches, including a "1%" patch, would also be worn.

== Criminal allegations and incidents ==
The Breed are designated an outlaw motorcycle gang by the U.S. Department of Justice. The club engaged in organized criminal activities including the production and distribution of methamphetamine, larceny, robbery, extortion, auto crime, weapons violations, intimidation, assault, rape and murder, and also operated legitimate businesses such as tattoo parlors and transport companies, which could serve as fronts for illegal activity. The Breed was involved in conflicts with rival motorcycle gangs, such as the Hells Angels, Pagans and Warlocks.

=== New Jersey ===
Fred "Sheik" Nichlos, the Breed's South Jersey chapter president, was shot dead after being dragged from his home in Jackson Township by two men on August 30, 1968. Thomas G. Russomanno Jr pleaded no defense to Nichlos' murder on February 5, 1969, and testified that he and Patsy Truglia had gone to Nichlos' home to retrieve a motorcycle in Nichlos' possession that they believed had been stolen from Truglia, and that a gun that he was holding to threaten Nichlos had fired accidentally.

On August 13, 1976, during a robbery by two gunmen of a check-cashing business in Kearny, one of the gunman killed Newark police officer John Snow. A Hudson County grand jury indicted Allen Roller, Bruce Reen, Victor Forni and Vincent James Landano for felony murder and armed robbery, along with other offenses. Roller was president of the Breed's Staten Island, New York chapter, Reen was also a Breed member and Forni was a club associate, while Landano was of friend of Forni. The state believed that Roller and Forni planned the robbery, but that only Landano and Roller actually participated in the crime. Two accomplices and three eyewitnesses identified Landano as Snow's murderer, and he was sentenced to fifteen-years-to-life in prison for the crime in April 1977. Landano was acquitted of murder in a retrial in 1998 and died at the age of sixty-three on November 11, 2002.

Breed members Kalani Lopa and Thomas Heilman were arraigned on two counts each of kidnaping after abducting club member John McGurk and Patricia McDevitt from McGurk's Bordentown home in an attempt to collect a $1,200 debt on August 17, 1977.

John Belowsky and James R. "Axl" Fleming – both identified as Breed members by authorities – and a third man, Pasquel Varona, were arrested during a raid on an apartment in Asbury Park which led to the seizure of handguns and almost $5,000 worth of cocaine on January 25, 1995. The three men were charged with drug and weapons offences.

Eugene "Gene" Bernardo, president of the Breed's Monmouth County chapter, was charged with conspiracy to distribute almost five-hundred grams of methamphetamine in a one-count federal indictment on January 6, 1998. He was convicted of the charge on May 26, 1999. Bernardo had acted as a middleman in a drug sale made by Carl Chianase to Drug Enforcement Administration (DEA) informant Kalani Lopa in January 1997.

On September 9, 1998, two Breed members, Edward "Cheeks" Papendick and Michael Schwab, stabbed two Pagans, Michael "Tattoo Mike" Hare and Stephen "Snake" Smith, at Bacio Tattoo and Piercing Parlor in Trenton. After a period of negotiations between the national president of the Breed and a New Jersey State Police detective, Papendick and Schwab surrendered to police on September 18, 1998. The bikers were each charged with three counts of aggravated assault and one count of weapons offenses.

Ten members of the Breed, including national president Salvatore "Old Man" DeIulio, were indicted on charges of extortion and sexual assault on January 28, 2000. The club was allegedly running protection rackets on strip clubs, tattoo parlors and other businesses in Long Branch. The sexual assault charges were brought after four women, who danced at the clubs, complained to the Howell Township police. One woman claimed to have been chained to the floor for several days, forced to engage in oral sex with several men and beaten severely. David Snyder, a strip club owner and former Breed member, was allegedly assaulted after attempting to reduce the number of sexual assaults on the dancers. On November 4, 2000, five Breed members were acquitted of extortion conspiracy. In June 2001, a Superior Court jury in Monmouth County acquitted Delulio of aggravated assault in a case in which he allegedly beat and sexually assaulted a nude dancer. However, a hung jury was declared on six other charges, including aggravated sexual assault and weapons possession.

Breed members Sanford Gorzelsky, Scott Lear and Frederick M. "Guido" DeCapua were indicted in July 2003 and charged with robbery, aggravated assault, hindering apprehension, weapons possession and retaliation against a witness. The trio allegedly attacked former Breed member Arne "Ole" Olsen at a bar in West Long Branch on October 5, 2002, in retaliation for his testimony in a court case involving other club members. On May 11, 2005, Gorzelsky was convicted of aggravated assault, and Lear was found guilty of conspiracy to commit aggravated assault and retaliation, while DeCapua was acquitted of all charges.

=== New York ===
On April 10, 1971, thirteen Breed members and associates, including Albert Doerbecker, the president of the Long Island chapter of the Breed, were arrested on weapons and narcotics charges after the Nassau County Police Department raided a party at the Long Island chapter clubhouse in Roosevelt, seizing guns, dynamite and drugs. 44 men and 16 women were also released without charge.

One Breed member, Alfred Brechesi, was fatally shot and another, Joseph Pascarella, was beaten and slashed during a confrontation with a group of around ten Hells Angels members on Staten Island, New York City, on July 25, 1971. Three Hells Angels – Anthony Morabito, John Scott and Howard Weisbrod – were charged with assault.

Seven members of the Breed allegedly committed an assault at gunpoint on two young women in a house on Staten Island in December 1971. Two members, Edward Verri and Joseph Pascarella, were arrested and charged with rape and sodomy on January 6, 1972.

=== Ohio ===
On March 6, 1971, the Breed participated in a large-scale brawl with the Hells Angels at a motorcycle trade show in Cleveland, involving over a hundred bikers from each side. Four members of the Breed – Bruce Emerick, Andrew Demeter, Amelio Gardull and Thomas A. Terry – and one Hells Angel – Jeffrey "Groover" Coffey – were stabbed to death, and twenty-three people were injured, including three police officers. Dozens of vans and cars full of police officers were called in to break up the fight. Although most of the bikers were able to flee, eighty-four were arrested at the scene. On March 9, 1971, forty-seven Breed members and ten Hells Angels were each charged with five counts of first-degree murder.

=== Pennsylvania ===
After being chased for over a mile by twelve Breed members on motorcycles, Michael Trunk – a Pagan and former Breed member – was shot in the head and killed by Breed member Ralph "Marlboro" Waldman in Abington Township in Montgomery County on July 22, 1973. Trunk's colors were then stolen. After Waldman and other Breed members were arrested, a brawl involving Breed and Pagans took place at Abington police station. Waldman was convicted of first-degree murder, aggravated assault, robbery, theft of movable property, criminal conspiracy, terroristic threats and two counts of simple assault on October 30, 1975, and was sentenced to life in prison. Two Breed members – George Schell and Joseph Zebrowski – and three Pagans involved in the brawl were cleared of aggravated assault in September 1973 after they refused to press charges against each other.

Mark Allen "Pockets" Chancellor, a prospective member of the Breed, was shot dead during a club meeting attended by seven other members at the farmhouse of Masury, Ohio, chapter president John Gilkey in Mercer County on October 13, 1973. Chancellor was allegedly killed for unwittingly violating a club rule during his membership initiation. His body was found on October 26, 1973, in a shallow grave approximately four-hundred feet from the Gilkey home by officers of the Pennsylvania State Police acting on an anonymous tip-off. New York chapter member William M. Zillgitt and New Jersey mother chapter sergeant-at-arms Gary Roman were convicted of second-degree murder and sentenced to ten-to-twenty years in prison, and Ohio chapter president Donald David "Kraut" Treftz was convicted of first-degree murder and sentenced to life in prison. Treftz escaped from SCI Huntingdon on July 22, 1993, and was apprehended by Federal Bureau of Investigation (FBI) agents and local police in Deadwood, South Dakota on April 6, 1995.

Breed member Ernest C. Custor stabbed motorist Dennis Carson in the throat with a hunting knife and attempted to stab his passenger Albert Falls following a road rage incident on Route 1 in Bucks County on April 24, 1976. Custor claimed temporary insanity, but was found guilty of attempted murder, simple assault, aggravated assault, reckless endangerment and possession of a prohibited offensive weapon.

In 1987 and 1989, Breed and Pagans members were involved in incidents of assault and kidnapping to settle disputes or to retaliate for acts of violence against fellow members. In one incident, a Breed member wearing his colors in the Philadelphia area – considered Pagan territory – was assaulted and robbed of his colors by Pagans members. Arrangements were made to negotiate a settlement to this dispute. However, two Breed members were arrested and charged with weapons offenses during the prearranged meeting. Reportedly, the two were present and armed to protect the chapter president, who was handling negotiations.

In December 1988, members of the Warlocks kidnapped the Breed's Bucks County chapter president Craig "Coyote" Gudkneckt in retaliation for several Warlocks being assaulted by Breed members at a bar in Bensalem Township. Gudkneckt was taken to the home of a Warlock where he was tied up, beaten and pistol-whipped. Gudkneckt escaped and subsequently reported the incident to police.

On July 21, 2006, fifteen members of the Breed were charged with running a large-scale methamphetamine ring after a year-long investigation by the Attorney General's Bureau of Narcotics Investigation, the Bucks County District Attorney's Office and the Philadelphia Police Department, known as Operation Breed on a Wire. Among the indicted were Pennsylvania chapter president John W. "Junior" Napoli, New Jersey mother chapter president John A. "Shameless" Kovacs and thirteen other club members. Police also seized more than twenty-two pounds of methamphetamine, nearly $500,000 in cash and bank deposits, forty-four firearms (including one submachine gun), ten improvised explosive devices, various vehicles and twenty-four motorcycles during a series of raids. Further charges relating to racketeering were added to the indictments of Napoli, William A. "Tattoo Billy" Johnson, Christopher "Slam" Quattrocchi, Thomas E. "Fuzzy" Heilman, Frederick F. "Pan Head" Freehoff and Eric "Kicker" Loebsack on July 26, 2007. A grand jury found that Napoli was the ring leader of the drug organization which operated in Pennsylvania and New Jersey, and distributed over 120 pounds of methamphetamine between May 2005 and June 2006, which has an estimated street value of more than $11.25 million. A total of nineteen Breed members were convicted in the case, receiving sentences ranging from three to thirty-six years in prison. On October 4, 2007, Napoli and Johnson were convicted of drug trafficking, racketeering and weapons charges, while Heilman was also convicted of conspiracy to traffic over five hundred grams of methamphetamine. Napoli received the harshest sentence of all of his co-conspirators when he was sentenced to thirty-six years' imprisonment on April 17, 2008. Heilman was sentenced to twenty years' on January 6, 2008, and Johnson was sentenced to thirty-five years' on April 11, 2008. Operation Breed on a Wire and the resulting convictions effectively dismantled the club. Remaining members who avoided the indictments subsequently dispersed or joined other clubs. Several Breed members patched over to the Outlaws and established a chapter in Kensington, Philadelphia.
