= Warlocks Motorcycle Club (Pennsylvania) =

Outlaw motorcycle club in the United States

Warlocks MC
- Abbreviation: WMC; Harpy Warlocks; Philly Warlocks
- Founded: February 1967; 59 years ago
- Founded at: Philadelphia, Pennsylvania, United States
- Type: Outlaw motorcycle club
- Headquarters: Philadelphia, Pennsylvania, United States
- Region served: Mid-Atlantic
- Website: harpywarlocksmotorcycleclub.com

The Warlocks Motorcycle Club, also distinguished as the Harpy Warlocks, the Philadelphia Warlocks, or the Philly Warlocks, is an American outlaw motorcycle club that was formed in Philadelphia in 1967. The club is most prominent in the Philadelphia metropolitan area, including Philadelphia, Delaware County and South Jersey, as well as in the nearby Lehigh Valley.

== History ==
The Warlocks Motorcycle Club was formed in the area of Southwest Philadelphia and the adjacent Delaware County, including Chester city and Upper Darby, in February 1967.

It later expanded into Northeast Philly, Kensington and the River Wards, establishing a prominent clubhouse in Fishtown, before spreading into South Philly, South Jersey, Bucks County, Berks County, and the Wilmington, Delaware area. The club's membership was bolstered by returning Vietnam veterans, and within three years of the Warlocks' foundation, the club had established chapters throughout the Lehigh Valley and throughout South Jersey.

Beginning in the 1970s, the Warlocks, along with the Pagans, became one of the most dominant motorcycle clubs in the Philadelphia metropolitan area.

== Insignia ==
The insignia of the Warlocks club consists of a multicolored caricature of a left-facing, winged harpy, a figure in Greek mythology. The club has trademarked the logo. In addition to the Warlocks emblem, members also wear a diamond-shaped "one percenter" patch on their club "colors".

These patches follow a red-and-white color scheme. Three tattoos — a swastika, a nude woman, and the words "Born to Lose" — are mandatory for Warlocks members. In reference to the club's Whites-only membership policy and the red-and-white color scheme used on members' patches, the Warlocks use the motto: "All white! Red and white!".

== Membership and organization ==
The Warlocks' "mother chapter" is based in Philadelphia, and the club has additional chapters in Delaware County, South Jersey, Maryland and Delaware. The club is governed by a president, vice president, secretary, treasurer, and sergeant-at-arms. Members must be White males aged over 18 who own a Harley-Davidson motorcycle. At its formation, only convicted felons were permitted to join the club. In 1989, the State of New Jersey Commission of Investigation estimated the club's membership at between 60 and 130.

== Criminal allegations and incidents ==
The Warlocks are considered by law enforcement to be among the many second-tier, after the "Big Four", outlaw motorcycle gangs. The Warlocks are involved in narcotics distribution, prostitution, kidnapping, burglary, the sale of stolen property, violent crime and murder. The club became heavily involved in methamphetamine trafficking in the early 1980s before also expanding its drug activities into cocaine distribution.

The Warlocks are allied with the Pagans and have associated in criminal activities with the Philadelphia crime family. Rival gangs include the Breed and the Florida Warlocks.

=== New Jersey ===
The Warlocks in New Jersey have had criminal associations with the Philadelphia crime family involving "strong-arm tactics" for labor unions. The club was linked to the Mafia connected Roofers Union Local 30 in Atlantic City.

On May 6, 1995, police sergeant Ippolito "Lee" Gonzalez of Franklin Township pulled over Warlocks members Robert "Mudman" Simon and Charles "Shovel" Staples on a traffic stop moments after the two had committed a commercial burglary. Simon shot Gonzalez twice, in the head and neck, and Gonzalez died instantly. Simon later said he shot Sergeant Gonzalez because he did not want to return to prison. Simon was quickly apprehended, pleaded guilty, and was sentenced to death. At the time of Gonzalez's murder Simon was barely three months out of jail and on parole after a 1981 conviction for killing a woman in Carbon County, Pennsylvania. In 1999, Simon was stomped to death by Ambrose Harris, another death-row inmate, in New Jersey's Trenton State Prison. Harris argued self-defense, and was acquitted.

In June 2010, a confrontation took place between members of the Warlocks and the Pagans when Warlock bikers wearing their club "colors" entered a bar in Gloucester City where Pagan bikers were among the patrons.

=== Pennsylvania ===
The Warlocks and the Pagans are the two primary motorcycle gangs in Pennsylvania. The club has five chapters in the state.

In December 1988, individuals associated with the Warlocks kidnapped the then Breed chapter president Craig "Coyote" Gudkneckt in retaliation for several Warlock members being jumped by Breed members in a Bensalem bar. Gudkneckt was taken to the home of a Warlock where he was tied up, beaten and pistol-whipped. Gudkneckt escaped.

In 2006, Tommy Zaroff, a former president of the Bucks County chapter of the Warlocks, was arrested on suspicion of possessing ten pounds of methamphetamine, and was sentenced to at least five years after pleading guilty to charges including distributing a controlled substance, profiting from illegal acts and conspiracy. On February 4, 2009, Daniel "Dirty Dick" McElheney, born about 1944 (age 81–82), was arrested under his alias Richard McElheney, after his home was raided by police. Police seized six rifles, ten handguns and various illegal drugs.

In October 2008, Pennsylvania State Attorney General Tom Corbett alleged that the Warlocks motorcycle club is involved with a methamphetamine manufacturing operation based in Berks County. The sting was dubbed "Operation Underground". Corbett said the operation manufactured and distributed $9 million worth of methamphetamine throughout southeastern Pennsylvania and possibly (supplied) to members of the Warlocks motorcycle club, which has allegedly been linked to organized crime and drug trafficking. "The Warlocks have been the subject of other investigations, and we will continue to investigate the Warlock–Spadafora meth connection," Corbett said. He added that the investigation was continuing and he expected more arrests. There were no Warlocks arrested or charged at the time of this press release.

In December 2017, Warlocks biker Michael DiMauro killed prospective club member David Rossillo Jr. at the Mount Moriah Cemetery in Philadelphia by shooting him four times, tying a rope around his neck and then dragging him to a crypt. After opening the lid, DiMauro then disposed Rossillo's body into a 19th-century crypt at the cemetery.

In February 2020, another prospective Warlock, Keith Palumbo, was also shot and killed by Warlocks member, Michael DeLuca, in a house on Woodland Avenue in Philadelphia, which served as the Warlocks' headquarters.

Three others — Billy Gibson, Buck Evans and Donna Morelli, a member of Mount Moriah Cemetery's board of directors — all pled guilty for their roles in the disposal of Palumbo’s body.

The bodies of both men were discovered in the cemetery crypt, April 2020, while police were investigating Palumbo in a missing persons report.

DeLuca pleaded guilty to third-degree murder in January 2023 and was sentenced to 15 to 30 years in prison.

In August 2023, DiMauro was convicted of first-degree murder, abuse of a corpse, and related charges and sentenced to life in prison without parole.

The motives behind the murders of Rossillo and Palumbo were never established.

== External links/sources ==
- The Original Warlocks MC
- Text from New Jersey State Commission of Investigation report on outlaw motorcycle gangs, as posted on New Jersey Mafia website
- Warlocks v. Warlocks
