= Hell's Lovers Motorcycle Club =

American motorcycle club

Hell's Lovers MC
- Abbreviation: HLMC; 812
- Founded: 1967; 59 years ago
- Founder: Frank "Claim-Jumper" Rios
- Founded at: Chicago, Illinois, U.S.
- Type: Outlaw motorcycle club
- Region served: United States
- Members: 1,500

The Hell's Lovers Motorcycle Club (HLMC), is a multi-ethnic outlaw motorcycle club founded in Chicago in 1967. The Hell's Lovers are active in various U.S. states. The club's motto is, "Death is my sidekick and the highway is my home." A "0%" diamond is worn in place of the traditional "1%" which all outlaw organizations use to separate themselves from the other 99% of law abiding motorcycle riders.

== History ==
One of the first integrated biker clubs in Chicago, the Hell's Lovers were founded in 1967 by Frank "Claim-Jumper" Rios, a Mexican-American from the city's West Side, after he was denied membership in another motorcycle club.

Rios died at the age of 62 from cardiac arrest attributed to complications from diabetes on December 28, 2009 in Milwaukee, where he moved from Chicago in 1997.

== Insignia ==
Members of the Hell's Lovers wear jackets with patches and rocker panels.

== Membership and organization ==
The Hell's Lovers claim a membership of over 1,500, with chapters located in various U.S. states, including Illinois, Tennessee, Colorado, Kansas, Texas, Georgia and Maryland. Current Supreme leader is Amir Johnson The Wisconsin Department of Justice describes the Hell's Lovers as a structured group with a "military style organization".

== Criminal allegations and incidents ==
The Wisconsin Department of Justice describes criminal activity by the Hell's Lovers as "decreasing," but says the club has been associated with drug trafficking and motorcycle theft.

Police raided the Hell's Lovers clubhouse in the Austin district on the West Side of Chicago on June 15, 1980, arresting nine men and seizing a hand grenade and three shotguns, after a 28-year-old woman was allegedly beaten and raped on the premises. Three members—Derrick Hargrett, Jessie Jones, and James Windham—were charged with rape, one—William Schaffer—was charged with unlawful use of weapons, and five others with disorderly conduct.

Hell's Lovers national president James Burrell was one of 31 people arrested on various charges on May 7, 1984 in relation to an undercover sting operation which recovered 488 items of stolen property. The investigation was carried out by the Evanston, Illinois police, the Cook County state's attorney's office gang crimes unit and the Illinois Department of Law Enforcement, which operated Kelly's Resale Shop, a second-hand store in Evanston, as a front for the sting.

Luther Vaughn Jr., a member of the St. Louis chapter of the Hell's Lovers, was shot and killed at the Jets Clubhouse Lounge, a nightclub in East St. Louis, on March 31, 1985, apparently by a member of the rival Marauders motorcycle club. A suspect was later arrested in St. Louis County, Missouri.

In June 2008, the Ironhorse Roundup Bike Show, a swap meet at the Lake County Fairgrounds, was canceled by Grayslake, Illinois mayor Timothy Perry after state and Federal law enforcement authorities had warned the Grayslake police chief of threats of violence between the Hell's Lovers and a rival outlaw gang, the Outlaws.

On August 2, 2010, a member of the Wheels of Soul fired upon the Hell's Lovers' clubhouse in Denver with a shotgun from a sports utility vehicle. Three Hell's Lovers bikers who were inside the clubhouse returned fire.

Gunshots were fired and a bystander suffered critical injuries after a man was involved in a dispute with "a group of people associated with the Hell's Lovers" in the parking lot of Victoria's Bar in Topeka, Kansas on May 14, 2023. Seven people were arrested by the Shawnee County Sheriff's Office in connection with the shooting.

Just after 7 p.m. on Oct. 9, 2025 at American Legion Post 273 in Wichita, KS, Darrel Buckner and Tony "Big Dub" Grayson, a Hell's Lovers member, got into a verbal disagreement. Buckner said, “(expletive) Hell’s Lovers.” Grayson then stood and shoved Buckner to the ground. Buckner went to his car and retrieved a Glock 22.40 caliber handgun and returned and shot Grayson five times, killing him.
