= List of Hells Angels support clubs =

Larger outlaw motorcycle clubs have been known to form support clubs, also known as "satellite clubs", which operate each with their own distinctive club name but are subservient to the motorcycle club that has established them. They offer support to the principal club in a number of different ways. This can include providing them with protection, financing or carrying out violent acts at the discretion of the larger club. Logos and insignia of support clubs displayed as patches on biker vests may bear a color scheme similar to or reminiscent of the logo belonging to the principal club as a way of signifying their allegiance.

With the Hells Angels Motorcycle Club being a worldwide force that has 592 chapters in 66 countries, their influence has allowed them to maintain and produce a number of support clubs around the globe.

== International ==
- Devils Choice MC, in Denmark, Iceland, Norway, Spain and Sweden.
- Iron Workers MC, in the United States and Canada.
- Red Devils MC, in nearly 20 countries.
- Eight Demons MC, In South East Asia, Asia and Guam.

== Belgium ==
- Egmond MC
- Globalriders MC

== Brazil ==
- Discipulos MC
- Evil Soldiers MC
- Red Pigs MC
- Rising Devils MC
- Rudes MC

== Bulgaria ==
- Red Riders MC

== Canada ==
- 103 Riders MC
- Apollos MC
- Death Riders
- Devil's Army MC, in Campbell River, British Columbia
- Devil's Child
- Devils Ghosts MC
- Dirty Few MC
- Evil Ones MC
- Fallen Saints MC
- Gate Keepers MC
- Helles Nation
- Highlanders MC
- Horsemen Brotherhood MC
- Hooligans MC - Sudbury, Ontario
- Jesters MC
- Katt Sass MC
- Langford Savages MC, in Langford, British Columbia
- Los Diablos MC
- Malicious Crew
- Maverick MC
- MinotauresMC
- Niners MC
- Red Devils
- Rockers MC (defunct)
- Satan's Angels MC, in British Columbia (patched over in 1983)
- Savages MC
- Shadow Club MC
- Stolen Souls MC
- Syndicate MC
- Teamsters' Horsemen MC
- Throttle Lockers MC
- Zig Zag Crew

== Chile ==
- Octanates Motoclub
- Vampiros MC

== Denmark ==
- AK81
- Avengers MC
- Mad Hatters MC
- Ghost Brothers MC

== Egypt ==
- Skull Pharaos Motorcycle Club

== Estonia ==
- League Motorcycle Club

== Finland ==
- Barley Motorcycle Club
- Cannonball Motorcycle Club (until 1996)
- Overkill Motorcycle Club

== France ==
- Apocalypse Riders
- Buccaneers
- Club de Clichy Motorcycle Club
- Road Cat's Motorcycle Club

== Germany ==
- Blood Red Section Motorcycle Club
- Brigade 81
- Caballeros Motorcycle Club
- Joker Motorcycle Club

== Indonesia ==
- Eight Demons Motorcycle Club

== Kuwait ==
- Desert Saints Motorcycle Club

== Latvia ==
- Bears Motorcycle Club
- Old School MC

== Norway ==
- Customizers Motorcycle Club
- Four Horsemen Motorcycle Club
- Screwdrivers Motorcycle Club
- Shit Happens Motorcycle Club
- Untouchables Motorcycle Club
- Vanguards Motorcycle Club
- Warriors Motorcycle Club

== Poland ==
- Fortress Motorcycle Club
- Head Hunters Motorcycle Club
- Red Indians Motorcycle Club
- Red Skulls Motorcycle Club

== Philippines ==
- Bangads Motorcycle Club
- Street Crew 81 Support
- Eight Demons MC
- Tanto Philippines
- Ronin Brotherhood Philippines

== Russia ==
- Red & White Army Motorcycle Club
- Seven Winds Motorcycle Club

== Serbia ==
- Messengers Motorcycle Club

== Slovakia ==
- Faraons Motorcycle Club

== Spain ==
- Red Celtas Motorcycle Club
- Rednecks Motorcycle Club
- Red devils motorcycle club

== Switzerland ==
- Broncos Motorcycle Club
- Kodiaks Motorcycle Club
- Razorbacks Motorcycle Club

== Thailand ==
- Death Messengers Motorcycle Club
- StreetCrew 81 Thailand
- Stronghead 198 Thailand
- Five Skulls Motorcycle Club
- Nonburirider MC Thailand
- Donovan Brotherhood MC
- Slum Motorcycle Club Samutprakan

== Turkey ==
- Red Warriors Motorcycle Club
- Red Devils Motorcycle Club
- Dark Kings Motorcycle Club
- Band of Brothers Motorcycle Club
- Ottomans Motorcycle Club

== Ukraine ==
- Barbarian Motorcycle Club
- Red Devils Motorcycle Club

== United Kingdom ==
- Barbarians Motorcycle Club
- Boudicca Sisterhood
- Red Devils MC
- Confederates Motorcycle Club
- Instigators Motorcycle Club
- Howlin’ Wolf MC. Notts.
- Stone Cross MC West Bromwich
- Incubus MC Midlands
- Lynx MCC Midlands
- Medusas MC Wales

== United States ==
- Aliens MC Nomads, in New York City (patched over in 1969)
- Alky Haulers Motorcycle Club, in California
- Animals Motorcycle Club, in Cleveland, Ohio (patched over in 1967)
- Bishops Motorcycle Club
- Bloody Hammers Motorcycle Club
- Bridgerunners Motorcycle Club
- Brothers Motorcycle Club, in Anchorage, Alaska (patched over in 1982)
- Brothers Fast Motorcycle Club, in Denver, Colorado (patched over in 2001)
- Chosen Brothers Motorcycle Club(Indiana)
- Confederate Angels Motorcycle Club, in Richmond, Virginia (defunct)
- Deathmasters Motorcycle Club
- Delinquents Motorcycle Club, in California
- Demons Blood Brotherhood Motorcycle Club
- Demon Knights Motorcycle Club, in New York
- Desperado's MC
- Devil's Pride MC
- Diamond Rattlers MC
- Dirty Dozen Motorcycle Club, in Arizona (patched over in 1997)
- Forty Seven Motorcycle Club
- Few Good Men Motorcycle Club
- Fossils Motorcycle Club
- Flesh and Blood MC
- Freemen Motorcycle Club
- Freewheelers Motorcycle Club
- Gear Headz MC Akron, Ohio
- Gooses Motorcycle Club, in Cleveland, Ohio (patched over in 1967)
- Grateful Dead Motorcycle Club, in Bridgeport, Connecticut (patched over in 1975)
- Hackers Motorcycle Club, in Rochester, New York (patched over in 1969)
- Hell's Henchmen Motorcycle Club, in Illinois and Indiana (patched over in 1994)
- Hellkats Motorcycle Club
- Hellside Motorcycle Club
- Hooligans MC, in Arizona
- Horror Merchants MC 1%ers Massachusetts, New Hampshire
- Iron Cross Motorcycle Club
- Kings of Mayhem Motorcycle Club
- Knights of Hell Motorcycle Club
- Longriders Motorcycle Club
- Lost Boys Motorcycle Club
- Lucky Breed Motorcycle Club
- Men of Liberty MC (Windsor, Maine)
- Merciless Souls
- Mercenaries MC
- Midgard Serpents
- Misguided Brotherhood MC
- Mortal Skulls Motorcycle Club
- Native Syndicate Motorcycle Club (Penobscot Maine)
- New Breed MC, Lincoln NE
- North Coast Motorcycle Club, in Akron, Ohio (patched over in 2015)
- Northwoods Riders Motorcycle Club
- Notorious Ryderz MC, Fresno CA
- Ol'Timers Motorcycle Club
- Rainmakers MC, Connecticut, Massachusetts, New Hampshire
- Rebel Rousers Motorcycle Club
- Road Reapers Motorcycle Club
- Road Warriors Motorcycle Club, NY USA
- Inland Troopers MC, CA
- Saracens Motorcycle Club, in Turner, Maine
- Satan's Soldiers
- Scorpions MC in Meadville, PA
- Scoundrels
- Sons of Hell MC, in Arizona, California, Indiana and Washington
- Strays MC N.E Ohio
- Street Legal Motorcycle Club
- Themadones Motorcycle Club
- Thunderbird Motorcycle Club
- Troubled Sons Motorcycle Club
- Undaunted Souls Motorcycle Club, in Rockland, New York
- Unforgiven Motorcycle Club
- Warlords MC, Minnesota (Support Club)
- Wisemen Motorcycle Club, Wayne County, OH
- Wolf Pack Motorcycle Club
- Valhalla Motorcycle Club
- Valkyries Akron, Ohio
- 5th Chapter Ohio, NY
- Phantom Lords MC
- THE RISING SONS SC, NEW YORK
- Total Misfits Riders Club, FL
