= Wheels of Soul Motorcycle Club =

American outlaw motorcycle club

Wheels of Soul MC
- Official patch and logo
- Founded: 1967
- Founded at: Philadelphia, Pennsylvania, United States
- Type: Outlaw motorcycle club
- Headquarters: Philadelphia, Pennsylvania, United States
- Region served: United States and Puerto Rico
- Members: Over 400

The Wheels of Soul Motorcycle Club are a multiracial one-percenter outlaw motorcycle club. Although they are active nationwide in the United States (in addition to a chapter in Puerto Rico), they are primarily based in Philadelphia, Pennsylvania. With chapters in at least 25 states across the US, the group claims to be the country's largest mixed-race outlaw motorcycle club.

== History ==
The Wheels of Soul Motorcycle club was founded in 1967 by an unidentified man known as "Coffee". The organization was set up in Philadelphia, which acted as the group's mother chapter as they began expanding into other states.

In the early 1970s, the Wheels of Soul was considered a social organization before evolving into an "outlaw" club.

== Insignia ==
Wheels of Soul members wear vests with patches designating rank or status within the club. According to federal prosecutors, members who achieve "diamond status" and are deemed "1 percenters" are particularly criminal and violent.

== Membership and organization ==
The Wheels of Soul "mother chapter" is based in Philadelphia. Chapters in Atlantic City, Freehold and Atco combined to form a single South Jersey chapter during the 1980s. The club has a nationwide presence, including 4 chapters in every state.

Although a racially mixed club, the membership of the Wheels of Soul is predominantly African-American. The Wheels of Soul have a membership of around 6000. Members are required to swear an oath to the organization and a constitution.

== Criminal activities ==
The Wheels of Soul Motorcycle Club have been deemed a violent gang by federal officials. Members of the Wheels of Soul are known to "raise money through robberies and by distributing drugs, especially crack cocaine, but also heroin". In addition to this, members have also committed various acts of violence including murder, attempted murder, conspiracy to commit murder, and kidnapping. Other criminal activities that the gang participates in include racketeering, extortion, and assault.

The organization, reportedly known to intimidate their rivals, has been involved in multiple disputes with other gangs, resulting in various armed conflicts and killings of rival gang members. Enemies of the Wheels of Soul include the Outcast Motorcycle Club, Sin City Titans, Hells Lovers Motorcycle Club and the Street Soldiers.

=== Crimes and legal issues ===
On November 22, 1979, Wheels of Soul was involved in a shootout at Woodrow Wilson High School in Camden, New Jersey against rival gang Ghetto Riders. The shootout occurred during a cross-town rivalry football game between Woodrow Wilson High School and Camden High School. Nineteen people were injured in the shootout.

In 2009, in an incident with a rival gang, members of the Wheels of Soul gunned down a member of the Sin City Titans in St. Louis, Missouri. The shooting had allegedly occurred after an apparent gang war was initiated by the group's Philadelphia chapter weeks prior to the incident.

On August 2, 2010, Wheels of Soul biker Marshall "Big Bo" Fry fired a shotgun at the clubhouse of the Hell's Lovers in Denver. Three members of Hell's Lovers returned fire. At the direction of Colorado chapter president Jerry "Shakka" Elkins, Fry and another Wheels of Soul member, Rasheed Jamal "Diamond" Brandon, traveled to East St. Louis, Illinois to kill members of the Outkast motorcycle gang in January 2011. The murder plot was never carried out because of the presence of police near an Outkast gathering.

Sometime during January 2011 in Chicago, a Wheels of Soul member shot a member of a rival gang, the Street Soldiers, killing them. The shooting commenced after an altercation had occurred between both parties. The gunman would later be identified as Anthony Robinson, who would later go on to shoot three individuals in the back who were fleeing from a party in Marion, Ohio, that same year. One of the victims was killed while another sustained serious wounds from the shooting.

A raid was conducted by federal agents on the West Philadelphia Wheels of Soul clubhouse in 2011 following an FBI investigation that began in 2009. The search resulted in the arrest of 18 members of the Wheels of Soul Motorcycle Club. They were charged with racketeering and other crimes, which they had committed in the St Louis area.

In 2012, four members of the Wheels of Soul Chicago chapter were charged with racketeering following an investigation by the ATF. The investigation occurred in Chicago, Illinois.

On December 7, 2012, seven members of the Wheels of Soul, including national vice president James C. "Animal" Smith, were convicted in federal court in St. Louis of racketeering conspiracy and related charges including murder, attempted murder, conspiracy to commit murder and tampering with evidence.

Shots were fired near the Wheels of Soul Motorcycle Club clubhouse in West Philadelphia in 2013, with three members being hit by gunfire.

On January 29, 2013, two members of the Real Kings Motorcycle Club entered the Cycle Gear in North Charleston, South Carolina, to make purchases. Five members of the Wheels of Soul Motorcycle Club then entered the shop and told the Real Kings members that they were not supposed to be there. This led to a melee confrontation which erupted into a shootout, leaving the president of the Real Kings MC dead as well as two Wheels of Soul MC members. The WOS members, identified as Ronald Reid and Barry Stinson, were later taken into custody and charged with second-degree assault and battery by mob. One of the Real Kings bikers had been sporting an Outcasts support patch at the time of the shooting.

In June 2014, Christopher Fields, a member of the Wheels of Soul was charged with shooting and killing his cousin, Todd Riley, in a road rage incident. Fields was riding his motorcycle alongside fellow club members of the Wheels of Soul New York chapter on Roosevelt Boulevard in Philadelphia and believed that Riley had cut him off in his Buick Century. Riley then proceeded to get out of his car and an argument sparked between him and the Wheels of Soul bikers. A disgruntled Fields then opened fire on Riley with his semiautomatic pistol, leaving him with fatal gunshot wounds that would take his life an hour later. Christopher Fields was apprehended not far from the scene, subsequently arrested and charged with murder, weapons offenses and related counts.

On August 30, 2014, Wheels of Soul member Steven Hicks was fatally gunned down while attending a party in Birmingham, Alabama, along with Wilbert Hawkins, a member of the Showstopper Motorcycle Club. It is suspected that members of the rival Outcast Motorcycle Club had shown up to the event with firearms and opened fire. Police have linked incident this incident to the murder of rapper Bobby Ray Stewart (an alleged member of the Outcast Motorcycle Club) in a nightclub in Columbus, Georgia, as well as the beating of a Fort Benning soldier that same night in that same nightclub.

Two women affiliated with the Wheels of Soul Motorcycle Club were charged with the illegal purchase and transfer of firearms during 2020 in Pennsylvania.

A drug bust in Isle of Wight County, Virginia in 2023 led to the arrest of a high-ranking member of the Wheels of Soul motorcycle gang.

Three motorcyclists led North Carolina troopers on a high speed chase on February 22, 2025, after police identified what appeared to be a stolen motorcycle with fictitious tags. The chase ended when one of them crashed into a car in an intersection. That rider was reportedly wearing "Wheels of Soul" colors, and carrying two unlicensed handguns.

== In popular culture ==
The Wheels of Soul Motorcycle Club are the subject of a 2005 hour-long documentary by Randall Wilson, entitled Wheels of Soul.
