= Gremium Motorcycle Club =

Outlaw motorcycle club in Germany

- Founded: 1972
- Founded at: Mannheim, Germany
- Type: Outlaw motorcycle club
- Region served: Europe
- Website: gremium-mc.com

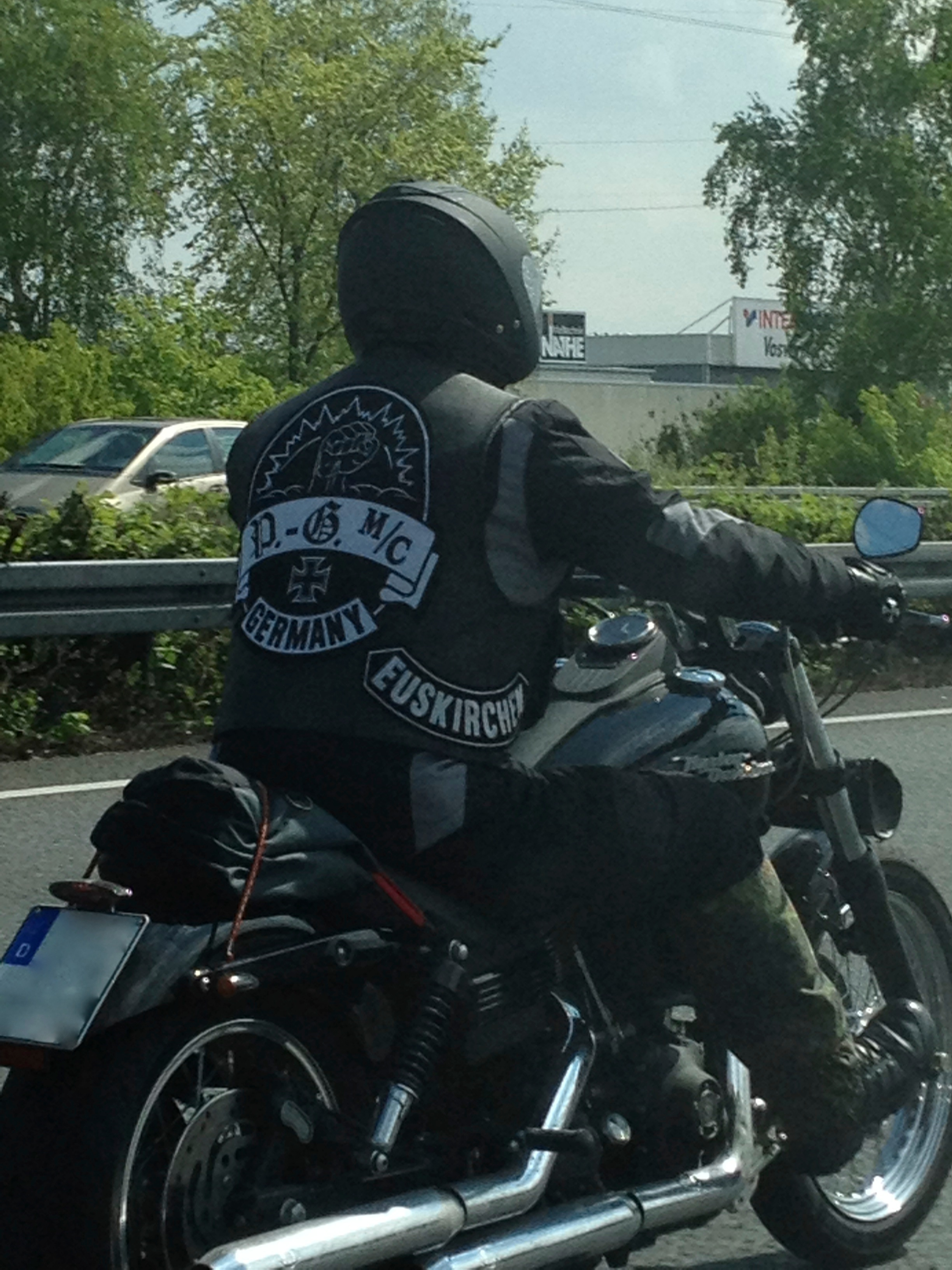
A European rider with a Gremium patch

Gremium Motorcycle Club is a German outlaw motorcycle club. Gremium claims to be the largest German motorcycle club since the patchover of the also formerly Mannheim-based German chapters of the Bones MC to the Hells Angels MC in 1999, with 73 full chapters in Germany, 71 chapters in other European countries, several associate chapters (Bad 7 MC support club) in Germany, and a prospect chapter opened by German expatriates in Pattaya, Thailand in 2007. The club was established in 1972 in Mannheim.

The club colors are black and white, on the back patch appears the word "GREMIUM" and the name of the country with a fist rising through clouds. Often, the terms "Black Seven" and the number 7 are used: the word "Gremium" consists of seven letters, and "G" is the seventh letter in the alphabet.

== Criminal investigations and sanctions ==
The society as a whole was prohibited on 10 November 1988 by the Ministry of the Interior of Baden-Württemberg as a criminal organization.

At the time of confrontation with the Mannheim judiciary, the bylaws were closely based on the Mannheim Studentenverbindung (student society or fraternity) "Hermunduria" in which the then President Michael "Mike" Heyer had been a member as a law student. Unaware of its origins, the prosecutor made accusations regarding forming a criminal association in addition to other offences. In subsequent criminal proceedings ordered by the District Court of Mannheim, the prosecution accused certain members of the club of crimes. The prosecutor, whose club informant turned out to be unreliable in court, had the charge of forming a criminal organization then fail.

On 16 January 1992, the club ban was lifted by the Administrative Court of Baden-Württemberg. Despite appropriate investigative efforts of the authorities, since it came only to convictions of individual members only and not as a renewed accusation against such a club.

Gremium is regularly listed among other large motorcycle clubs, for example in the Annual Report on the Protection of the Constitution on Bavaria. In these reports, the body, with other mentioned motorcycle clubs associated with it, is associated with human trafficking, illegal prostitution, drug and/or weapons trafficking and organized crime. According to the German Federal Criminal Police Office in 2010, there were five organized crime investigation with respect to Gremium.

== Racing sponsorship ==
Gremium is a sponsor of the Black 7 Racing Team top fuel dragbike, along with more traditional corporate sponsors such as DeWalt Tools.
