= Moonshiners Motorcycle Club =

American riding club

MOONSHINERS M.C.
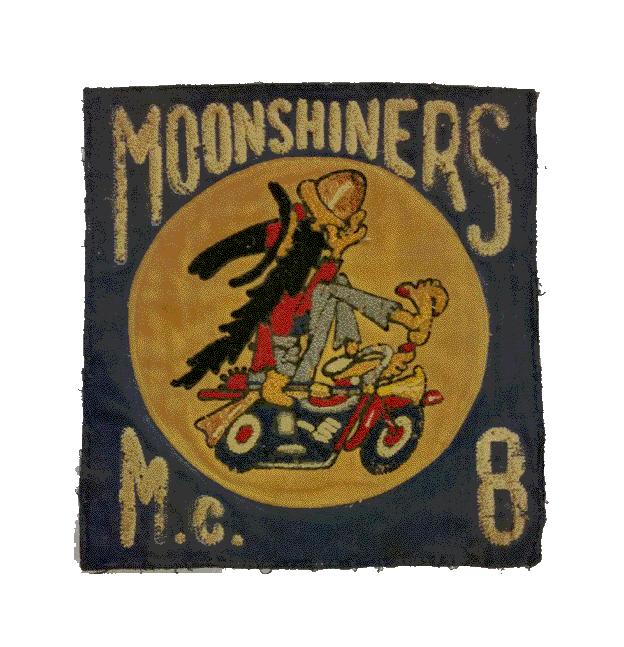
- Abbreviation: MSMC
- Founded: 1934
- Founder: Compton Moonshiners M.C.
- Founded at: Compton, CA
- Type: Riding Club & Racing Club
- Region served: United States
- Website: http://moonshiners13mc.webs.com/

The Moonshiners Motorcycle Club, also referred to as the Compton Moonshiners Motorcycle Club, was started in Compton California in 1934. The Moonshiners Motorcycle Club is a motorcycle club, which in 1947 along with other California motorcycle clubs like the Pissed Off Bastards of Bloomington MC, Boozefighters MC, Market Street Commandos MC, 13 Rebels MC, Sharks MC, Top Hatters MC, Salinas Ramblers MC, Yellow Jackets MC and the Galloping Goose MC participated in the highly publicized "Hollister Riot" later immortalized on the film as The Wild One.

== History ==
The Moonshiners Motorcycle Club was one of the many motorcycle clubs that started as a motorcycle racing club and later changed into a motorcycle club which does both street riding and dirt racing. In 1939 the Moonshiners M.C. was awarded the S.C.O.F. "Diamond 13 Award" which was awarded to the "Top 13" racing clubs of that year. The Moonshiners M.C. wear the Southern California Outlaw Federation (S.C.O.F.) Diamond 13 patch today. The S.C.O.F. was an anti-American Motorcyclist Association (A.M.A.) movement for the purpose of opposing the A.M.A. rules. During the 1930s and 1940s the term "Outlaw" referred to the motorcycle rider or a motorcycle club not being a member of A.M.A., it did not mean they were criminals or involved in criminal activity. Due to the Moonshiners Motorcycle Club taking part in the Hollister Riot and being a non-A.M.A. motorcycle club they are partly responsible for being referred to as the 1% from the A.M.A. Officials for not belonging to A.M.A. Without the lawless behavior of these early motorcycle clubs at both Hollister Riot in 1947 and Riverside Riot in 1948, the "1% Outlaw Rebel Biker" term wouldn’t exist today.
