= Hells Angels MC criminal allegations and incidents in Canada =

Criminal incidents involving the Hells Angels Motorcycle Club in Canada

The Hells Angels Motorcycle Club, an international outlaw biker gang, has been involved in multiple crimes, alleged crimes, and violent incidents in Canada. The Criminal Intelligence Service Canada (CISC) has designated the Hells Angels an outlaw motorcycle gang. Hells Angels MC have been linked with drug trafficking and production, as well as many violent crimes including murder, in Canada.

== Background ==
According to CBC News, the Hells Angels have thirty-four chapters operating in Canada with 460 full-fledged (patched) members. According to this article, the Hells Angels had at that time fifteen chapters in Ontario, eight in British Columbia, five in Quebec, three in Alberta, two in Saskatchewan and one in Manitoba.

In a speech to the House of Commons, Bloc Québécois MP Réal Ménard (Hochelaga) stated that there were thirty-eight HAMC chapters across Canada in the mid-1990s. The Vancouver Sun newspaper reports that Canada has more Hells Angels members per capita than any other country, including the U.S., where there are chapters in about twenty states. The Canadian Hells Angels have partnered the Medellín Cartel, the Rizzuto crime family, the Sinaloa Cartel and the West End Gang in criminal operations. Additionally, the club has also formed alliances with various street gangs, including the Independent Soldiers, the Red Scorpions, the United Nations and the White Boy Posse, and smaller motorcycle gangs, such as Bacchus, the Gate Keepers and the Red Devils.

The Hells Angels established their first Canadian chapters in the province of Quebec during the seventies. On 5 December 1977, the first Canadian chapter was founded in Montreal when a club called the Popeyes led by Yves Buteau were "patched over". In September 1979, new Angels chapters were established in Laval and Sherbrooke. In Western Canada, in 1983 a Vancouver club known as Satan's Angels were patched over to form the first BC chapter. In December 1984, the 13th Tribe biker club in Halifax, Nova Scotia led by David "Wolf" Carroll "patched over" to become the first Hells Angels chapter in Atlantic Canada. The Outlaws and several affiliated independent clubs such as Satan's Choice and Para-Dice Riders were able to keep the Angels from assuming a dominant position in Ontario, Canada's most populous province until 2000. On the Prairies, the Grim Reapers of Alberta, Los Bravos in Manitoba, and several other independent clubs across the Prairies formed a loose alliance that kept the Hells Angels from assuming dominance in the Prairie provinces until the late nineties. In 1997 the Grim Reapers club of Calgary, Alberta were patched over and in 1998, the Rebels of Saskatoon, Saskatchewan joined. By the end of 2000, under the leadership of Walter "Nurget" Stadnick, and after the largest patchover in Canadian history occurred in Montreal with the bulk of the Ontario biker clubs "patching over" on 29 December 2000, the Hells Angels had become the dominant club not just in BC and Quebec, but all across Canada, with chapters in at least seven of ten provinces and affiliates in at least two of the three territories. On 12 January 2002, a Hells Angels convention in Toronto was gate-clashed by the mayor of Toronto, Mel Lastman, who was photographed shaking hands with an Angel, Tony Biancaflora, and told the media the Angels were "fantastic" for bringing so much "business" to Toronto, saying: "You know, they just a nice bunch of guys". Josée-Anne Desrochers, the mother of the 11-year-old Daniel Desrochers killed by an Angel bombing in 1995, stated: "I find it degrading. Is the government with us or is it the bikers who are with the government?". In 2006, the Bandidos, the only possible rivals to the Hells Angels in Canada, self-destructed with the Shedden massacre, leaving the Angels as the only national outlaw biker club in Canada. An officer with the Ontario Provincial Police stated that after the Shedden massacre that: "The Hells Angels were on easy street. They had a monopoly across Canada."

== By province ==
=== Alberta ===
The Hells Angels expanded into Alberta when they "patched over" the Grim Reapers biker gang to form chapters in Lethbridge, Red Deer, Edmonton and Calgary, in July 1997. Up to 30 Grim Reapers members became Hells Angels during a "patch over" ceremony held in Red Deer. According to the Criminal Intelligence Service Alberta (CISA), the Hells Angels in Alberta have failed to make significant inroads in the criminal underworld of the province, in stark contrast to the Hells Angels in other provinces. One CISA report noted: "Without making light of their propensity for extreme violence—augmented by loyalty to the club’s name—members of the Hells Angels continue to lack in criminal business savvy. They have proven themselves to be an available source of ‘muscle’ either for their own endeavors or for other criminal organizations. They are preoccupied with the supremacy of their name within the criminal biker subculture".

The Calgary Hells Angels chapter was forced to abandon a fortified clubhouse under construction in Bowness because of building code violations. On 2 April 1998, utility workers cut the gas and power supply to the clubhouse after construction workers ignored a stop work order which had been issued because the Hells Angels failed to apply for permits. The Hells Angels subsequently filed a $100,000 lawsuit against the city. The president of the Calgary chapter, Kenneth Michael Szczerba, also plotted to bomb the homes of alderman Dale Hodges and community activist Morningstarre Perdue, who had opposed the building of the clubhouse. Szczerba was charged on 4 August 1999 with three counts of counselling mischief endangering life and one count of counselling assault causing bodily harm. On 29 June 2001, he was sentenced to one year in jail and two years probation after being convicted of counselling another person in the bomb plot.

On 30 January 2004, Joey Campbell, a probationary member of the Edmonton Bandidos chapter, was shot and killed along with another man, Robert Charles Simpson, in the parking lot of St. Pete's Men's Club, an Edmonton strip club. Although there was widespread speculation that the Hells Angels had killed Campbell and Simpson, the murders remain unsolved. A period of peace between the Hells Angels and the Bandidos followed. In October 2004, the Hells Angels established a monopoly over the outlaw biker subculture in Alberta when 18-to-20 members of the Bandidos Edmonton chapter, the Bandidos' entire membership in the province, "patched over" to join the Hells Angels Nomads chapter based in Red Deer. After the merger, which effectively tripled the Hells Angels' membership in Alberta, three motorcycle gangs remained in the province; the Hells Angels, and two other gangs who work directly for the Hells Angels.

=== British Columbia ===
The first three British Columbia HAMC chapters, in Nanaimo, Vancouver and White Rock, were founded on 23 July 1983 after a merger of the Satan's Angels club. A fourth chapter, in East Vancouver, was established later that year and became the Hells Angels' leading chapter in the province. According to a joint report by the Royal Canadian Mounted Police (RCMP) and United States Drug Enforcement Administration (DEA), the club was in control of "all outlaw motorcycle gang activity in British Columbia" by the mid-1980s. The Hells Angels have since expanded to ten chapters and membership of over a hundred in the province. The Hells Angels control the methamphetamine trade in British Columbia.

In late 2004 to 2005, the culmination of investigations into the actions of the motorcycle club led to charges against 18 people, including members of the Hells Angels and other associates of the gang.

=== Manitoba ===
In August 1996, three men were shot dead inside a home in West Kildonan, Winnipeg as part of a feud over control of drug and prostitution rackets between members of the Manitoba Warriors and associates of the Hells Angels. Two men were convicted of first-degree murder and sentenced to life in prison with no chance of parole for twenty-five years. A third accused was acquitted. The Hells Angels' expansion into Manitoba began with a relationship with Los Bravos, a local motorcycle club. In 2000, Los Bravos were "patched over," becoming a full-fledged HAMC chapter.

On February 15, 2006, the Manitoba Integrated Organized Crime Task Force, along with over 150 police officers from the RCMP, Winnipeg Police Service and Brandon Police Service, made numerous arrests and conducted searches as part of the investigation of Project Defense. Thirteen people were indicted on a variety of charges, including drug trafficking, extortion, proceeds of crime, and organized crime related offenses.

Project Defense was initiated in November 2004 and focused on high level members of drug trafficking cells in the province of Manitoba, including members of the Manitoba Hells Angels. During the investigation police made numerous seizures that totaled in excess of seven kilograms of cocaine and three kilograms of methamphetamine from drug traffickers within the Manitoba Hells Angels organization and other drug trafficking cells. Arrest warrants were issued for thirteen individuals and 12 search warrants were authorized for locations in Winnipeg and area.

This long-term covert investigation was initiated by the Manitoba Integrated Organized Crime Task Force, which was established in the spring of 2004 when an Agreement was signed between the Winnipeg Police Service, the RCMP, the Brandon Police Service and the province of Manitoba. The mandate of the task force was to disrupt and dismantle organized crime in the province of Manitoba.

On December 12, 2007, Project Drill came to an end, with Winnipeg Police raiding the Hells Angels clubhouse on Scotia Street. Project Drill started the previous evening with arrests in Thompson and continued throughout the night and early morning in Winnipeg and St. Pierre-Jolys. During the course of Project Drill, police seized vehicles, approximately $70,000 cash, firearms, marijuana, Hells Angel related documents/property and other offense related property. As of December 12, 14 people were in custody and four were still being sought.

Police said it was the second time the chapter president was the target in a police sting since the gang set up shop in the city in 2001. Hells Angels prospect member Al LeBras was also arrested at his Barber Street home in Wednesday's raids.

The 2004 Criminal Property Forfeiture Act gives the province the power to seize the proceeds of crime. Police have exercised similar authority against Hells Angels members in other Canadian cities.

On December 2, 2009, Project Divide culminated with 26 arrests, and 8 arrest warrants still outstanding after the year-long investigation. The investigation and arrests targeted alleged drug-trafficking and related activities of the Zig Zag Crew – a puppet club of the Hells Angels Winnipeg chapter.

Other joint investigations include:

- Project Develop, a joint 18-month investigation with Ontario, New Brunswick, and British Columbia
- In January 2006, Project Husky, a two-year investigation involving police forces in Ontario, Quebec and Alberta, resulted in the arrest of twenty-seven suspects including five full-patch Angels from across Eastern and Central Canada
- Project Koker, 23-month investigation in Edmonton and Calgary
- Project Halo, a three-year investigation by the Combined Forces Special Enforcement Team of the RCMP, into alleged criminal activity with the Nanaimo chapter. The investigation culminated in the search warrant being executed on December 12, 2003. On November 9, 2007, a seizure order was executed, under section 467.12(1) of the Criminal Code, on the clubhouse by dozens of heavily armed RCMP officers.

=== Nova Scotia ===
The 13th Tribe biker club in Halifax led by David "Wolf" Carroll "patched over" to become the first Hells Angels chapter in Atlantic Canada on 5 December 1984. According to the Royal Canadian Mounted Police (RCMP) and United States Drug Enforcement Administration (DEA), the HAMC saw the Port of Halifax as a pivotal entry point for cocaine shipments from Florida and South America, and the Hells Angels' amalgamation of the 13th Tribe allowed the club "to consolidate control of drug trafficking on Canada's East Coast".

On 6 August 1993, four Hells Angels members on board the Fortune Endeavor jettisoned a 750 kilogram cocaine shipment off the coast of Sheet Harbour after the ship suffered mechanical failure, leaving the ship's crew with no choice but to accept a tow from a Canadian Coast Guard vessel. The drug consignment, stored in waterproof packets hidden inside nine cast iron sewer pipes, had been transferred to the Fortune Endeavor after it rendezvoused in international waters with a ship that had left Venezuela. As part of a conspiracy organized by the Montreal and Quebec City Hells Angels chapters, along with the Rizzuto crime family, the cocaine was intended to be dumped in the St. Lawrence River off Anticosti Island and later retrieved by the trawler Annick C II with the use of sonar and the assistance of a team of divers. On 25 August 1993, the RCMP raided 39 locations in Nova Scotia, Quebec and New Brunswick and Newfoundland and Labrador, arresting nineteen people in connection with the narcotics shipment. Four trawlers, a speedboat and a yacht were also seized. The submerged cocaine was retrieved by the Canadian Navy submersible Pisces IV and diving support vessel HMCS Cormorant on 14 November 1994. Several Hells Angels, as well as Rizzuto family associate Raynald Desjardins, were ultimately convicted in the case.

As a result of tensions between the Hells Angels and crack cocaine dealer Sean Simmons dating as far back as the mid-1990s, "full patch" Hells Angel Neil Smith ordered the killing of Simmons, who had allegedly also had an affair with Smith's girlfriend. In exchange for the reduction of a drug debt owed to Smith, two of his partners in his drug-dealing business, Paul Derry and Wayne James, agreed to carry out the murder. Another man, Steven Gareau, was tasked with locating Simmons. On October 3, 2000, James, Gareau, James' nephew Dean Kelsie and Derry's wife Tina Potts traveled to Simmons' apartment building in Dartmouth. Kelsie then fatally shot Simmons in the building's lobby. Kelsie was convicted of first-degree murder and conspiracy to commit murder in 2003, and sentenced to life in prison with no chance of parole for at least 25 years. The Nova Scotia Court of Appeal overturned the conviction in 2018, and a new trial was ordered. In March 2019, the Supreme Court of Canada ruled that a new trial was not necessary, upheld Kelsie's conspiracy conviction, and reduced the first-degree murder conviction to the lesser charge of second-degree murder.

Michael McCrea, the president of the Hells Angels Halifax chapter served as the Angels world secretary until 2003, responsible for keeping the membership lists accurate for all Hells Angels chapters in the entire world. McCrea was the only Canadian on the Hells Angels world executive, and frequently visited other Hells Angels chapters around the world. The Halifax Regional Police and the Royal Canadian Mounted Police in a joint operation recruited a small time drug dealer known only as "Bill" due to a court to work as an informer."Bill" saw the Hells Angels murder another drug dealer and in 2006 he told the journalists Julian Sher and William Marsden: "I would either kill them or be killed". The undercover work of "Bill" led to the three "full patch" Angels from the Halifax chapter being convicted of drug charges. Paul Derry, a drug dealer helped the Angels murder a Port of Halifax worker, and agreed to turn Crown's evidence when faced with first degree murder charges. Derry told Sher and Marsden: "In the eye of the public, I come out of this looking like a hitman who got away with murder. I appeased my guilt by ratting on everyone. But you gotta deal with it. It comes down to this: me going to jail for life or them". Derry served no prison time and is currently living in hiding under an alias. Derry's testimony led to the conviction of one "full patch" member of the Halifax chapter along with several "prospects" and "hang-arounds". Hells Angels rules require a chapter to have at least six members at any given moment or else lose their charter. As the Halifax chapter had four chapters following the convictions, Sonny Barger revoked the charter of the Halifax chapter in 2003, which ceased to exist. McCrea was forced to return his bikers vest with the Hells Angels patch following the revocation of the Halifax chapter.

=== Newfoundland ===
On 11 October 2007, the Royal Newfoundland Constabulary arrested 12 people in connection with a Hells Angels-linked drug ring in St. John's headed by Patrick Champoux of the Hells Angels Montreal chapter. The police believed that the Champoux gang was importing about $1 million of cocaine into Newfoundland per month and were the largest drug dealers in the province. Champoux was arrested in May 2008 in Quebec. In August 2009, Champoux was sentenced to five years in prison.

=== Ontario ===
In the late 1990s, Hells Angels in Quebec began a campaign headed by Walter "Nurget" Stadnick to consolidate all of Ontario's motorcycle gangs under the control of the Hells Angels. On 29 December 2000, 179 outlaw bikers from Ontario attended a ceremony at the Hells Angels clubhouse in Sorel, Quebec in which they "patched over" to join the Hells Angels, establishing the club in Ontario. There are several hundred Hells Angels members in the province.

=== Quebec ===
==== Background ====
Quebec's economic crisis of the 1920s saw many of the province's urban population heading for the rural communities in order to cultivate lands to provide for themselves and their families. The settlers' children, like many youth of this era, were rebellious and rejected their parents' values. The period from 1936 to 1960 is remembered by Québécois as the Grande Noirceur ("Great Darkness") when Quebec was for the most part ruled by the ultra-conservative Union Nationale party who imposed traditional Catholic values in a way now considered to be oppressive. With the 1960 provincial election that resulted in the Union Nationale being defeated by the Quebec Liberals, which is considered to be the beginning of the Quiet Revolution that saw Quebec go during the course of a decade from being a very conservative to being a very liberal society. As part of the reaction against the "medieval" Catholic values of the Grande Noirceur saw the emergence of a hedonist culture in Quebec with la belle province having, for example, a significantly higher rate of drug use and illegitimate births than English Canada. As part of the same backlash against the "suffocating" conformism of the Grande Noirceur, outlaw biker clubs became extremely popular in Quebec in the 1960s as many young French-Canadian men saw the outlaw biker culture as a way of expressing rebelliousness and machismo, and by 1968 Quebec had 350 outlaw biker clubs.

By the 1960s, Quebec outlaw motorcycle clubs incorporated many of the same characteristics as American biker clubs. One result of having so many outlaw biker clubs in the same province was an especially brutal competition for the control of organized crime rackets in Quebec. The crime journalist James Dubro stated about the distinctive outlaw biker sub-culture of Quebec: "There's always has been more violence in Quebec. In the biker world it's known as the Red Zone. I remember an Outlaws hit man telling me he was scared going to Montreal." The expansion of these groups flourished during the 1970s, as a few popular gangs, notably the Hells Angels and the Outlaws, grew almost 45% due to Quebec's biker groups affiliating themselves with their American counterparts.

On 17 February 1978, Yves "Apache" Trudeau, the Hells Angels leading assassin, killed an Outlaw outside of a Montreal bar. In the ensuring biker war between the two gangs, Trudeau confirmed his reputation as a "psychopathic killer" as he killed 18 out of the 23 Outlaws slain during the conflict. The conflict ended in 1984 with the Hells Angels as the leading biker gang in Quebec and the Outlaws as the leading gang in Ontario. In 1985, in the Lennoxville massacre, the Angels liquidated their chapter in Laval, which caused much them disorganization with many of their leaders being imprisoned and the national president of Hells Angels Canada, Michel "Sky" Langois, fleeing to Morocco to escape an arrest warrant for first degree murder. The Quebec branch of the Hells Angels at its prime included various clubhouses across Quebec which housed many of the gang's puppet groups, who would often carry out the gang's criminal activity. Every Quebec region had its own puppet club: the Rockers Motor Club in Montreal, the Rowdy Ones in Sorel, the Evil Ones in Drummondville, the Satan's Guard in the Saguenay region, and the Jokers in St-Jean, which includes Maurice Boucher's son, Francis, as a full-fledged member.

Independent drug dealer Jean-Claude "La Couette" Maltais was fatally shot at least five times with a 9mm pistol by two unidentified suspects on a snowmobile as he left the Faubourg Sagamie shopping centre in Jonquière on 29 January 1993. Prior to his death, Maltais had refused to capitulate to the Hells Angels' Trois-Rivières chapter led by Louis "Mélou" Roy and Richard "Crow" Émond, and he had reportedly considered bombing the Hells Angels' clubhouse on Rue St. Paul.

The Canadian Hells Angels have a close association with the British Hells Angels, and the Montreal chapter was involved in shipping cocaine to the London chapter. In 1994, the Montreal chapter shipped 558 kilograms of Columbian cocaine to the London chapter and unknowingly recruited an undercover agent of the Royal Canadian Mounted Police who posed as an unscrupulous Canadian businessman living in London who agreed to provide the necessary import licenses to allow the cocaine to be shipped to London. On 17 August 1994, a ship loaded with the cocaine left Barranquilla while two members of the Montreal chapter, Pierre Rodrique and David Rouleau, were sent to London to pick up the payment when the ship arrived. Forwarded by the Mounties, Scotland Yard arrested Rodrique and Rouleau after they paid for the cocaine. Nick Clark of the National Criminal Intelligence Service stated: "When the rooms were searched, they found contact lists for all the UK chapters. We suspected they were going to use that for a distribution network". Rodrique and Rouleau were convicted and sentenced to 14 years in prison.

==== Quebec Biker war ====
The Quebec Biker war between the Hells Angels and the Rock Machine began in 1994 and continued until late 2002 and claimed more than 162 lives, including innocent bystanders. Maurice (aka Mom) Boucher was the leader of the Quebec chapters and second-in-command of the Canadian Nomad chapter, a chapter with no fixed geographic base. On 13 September 2000, Michel Auger, the crime correspondent of Le Journal de Montréal was shot five times in the back while opening the trunk of his car in the parking lot of Le Journal de Montréal, and was almost killed. In the aftermath of the attempting assassination of Auger, journalists demonstrated in Montreal demanding that the Canadian government pass an RICO type act that would see the Hells Angels declared a criminal organization. In October 2000, a bar owner in the town of Terrebonne named Francis Laforest refused to permit the Rowdy Ones, a puppet club of the Hells Angels, to sell drugs in his bar. As Laforest was walking his dog, he was attacked on the streets in the daylight by three masked men who beat him to death with baseball bats. Led by Auger, a protest took place in Montreal to honor Laforest with Auger saying of Quebec's murderous outlaw bikers: "They believed that they are on the top of the world. The criminals had built up a system so sophisticated that they are above the law...We are the only country in the world where the gangs have a free ride". In May 2002, Boucher received a life sentence, with no possibility of parole for at least 25 years, after being convicted of two counts of first-degree murder for the killings of two Canadian prison guards, ambushed on their way home.

==== Anti-gang legislation, investigations ====
On April 15, 2009, operation SharQc was conducted by the Sûreté du Québec. The first specialized organized crime law enforcement task force in the province was composed of the RCMP (Royal Canadian Mounted Police), the Sûreté du Québec and the Montréal Police. Their goal was to investigate the Nomad chapter of the Hells Angels in the Montreal and Quebec City regions until it was dismantled two years later to make way for a bigger, province-wide Task force.

The Hells Angels threat in Quebec and Canada resulted in the first anti-gang law in Canadian legislation, as the Canadian government wished to build on the success of the American anti-racketeering legislation known as RICO. Furthermore, during the period the Canadian anti-gang legislation was created, many Montrealers were experiencing a high volume of violent acts which threatened civilians.

==== Arrests and acquittal ====
On April 15, 2009, operation SharQc was conducted by the Sûreté du Québec. According to police, at the time it was the biggest strike at the HAMC in Canada's history and probably in all of HAMC's history. In all, 177 strikes were conducted by the police, 123 members were arrested, charged with for first-degree murder, attempted murder, gangsterism, or drug trafficking. The police seized $5 million in cash, dozens of kilograms of cocaine, marijuana and hashish, and thousands of pills. The operation was expected to lead to the closing of 22 unsolved murders. Operation SharQc involved a full-patch member of the gang turning informant, a very rare occurrence in Quebec. In October 2015, Quebec Superior Court Judge James Brunton ruled that delay between the arrests in 2009 as part of Operation SharQc and 2015 violated the right to a speedy trial guaranteed by the Charter of Rights and Freedoms and dismissed all of the charges against the Hell's Angels arrested as part of Operation SharQc.

==== Turf war ====
In 2023, the Quebec City chapter of the Hells Angels was reported to be engaged in a turf war with the Blood Family Mafia.

=== Saskatchewan ===
By 1995, the Hells Angels were courting the Rebels of Saskatoon, the most powerful motorcycle gang in Saskatchewan, for membership. In September 1998, the Rebels "patched over" to join the Hells Angels. In 2000, the Hells Angels forced the disbanding of the Apollos biker gang in Regina. According to Sergean Bill Cameron of the Saskatoon Police Service: "Since the creation of the Hells Angels in Saskatchewan we've observed an increase in methamphetamines — a substance virtually unseen in the province before the Angels got here".
