= Kings Crew Motorcycle Club =

Canadian outlaw motorcycle club

- Emblem of the Kings Crew MC
- Founded: 1977
- Founding location: Calgary, Alberta, Canada
- Years active: 1977–1990s
- Territory: Alberta
- Membership (est.): 50
- Criminal activities: Drug trafficking, Murder, Assault, Extortion
- Allies: Rebels Motorcycle Club, and, later, the Hells Angels, Lobos
- Rivals: Grim Reapers, Warlocks Motorcycle Club (Florida), CPS, RCMP,

The Kings Crew Motorcycle Club was an outlaw motorcycle club based in Western Canada and was founded in Calgary, Alberta in 1977. Where it would become one of the provinces most dominant clubs, participating in the Alberta Biker Conflict, until eventually joining the Hell's Angels in the late 1990s.

== Alberta Biker conflict ==
Along with the Grim Reapers Motorcycle Club, Warlords Motorcycle Club, and Rebels Motorcycle Club, the Kings Crew became one of the four dominant outlaw motorcycle clubs operating in Alberta prior to 1997. By the late 1990s, the Kings Crew became part of the Hells Angels in a patch-over ceremony held in Calgary, Alberta, Throughout the 1970s the Rebels had multiple violent exchanges with their main rivals in the province the Grim Reapers Motorcycle Club, most of the clashes occurred off of the authorities' radar and received little media attention The 1970s would prove to be an extremely dominant period for the Rebels, the club held an "iron fisted territorial policy" which saw them battle for dominance in the province against several other groups and since the clubs creation in 1968, it has either defeated or absorbed 13 separate clubs in Alberta. Their "cuts" were taken and displayed upside down on the walls of the Rebels Mother Chapter clubhouse

In 1975, the Rebels gained a certain level of notoriety (respect in some circles) due to their publicised conflicts with Francophone unit of Canadian Airborne Regiment known as "One Commando". In one of these infamous clashes, about 40 members of the Airborne showed up with nunchaku, steel bars, baseball bats, and blackjacks, and ambushed 23 Rebels at the club bar in Edmonton. After a skirmish, the bruised and battered paratroopers retreated and the Rebels went back to their business. This event came to be known as "Battle of the Kingsway" in Rebel Folklore.

In the early eighties, as the Reapers grew more powerful and the Rebels less so, the Rebels were warned by the Reapers not to fly the "Alberta" lower rocker on threat of club warfare, so members of the Rebel's Calgary chapter used "Southern Alberta" for the lower rocker and Edmonton members flew "Northern Alberta". King's Crew, meanwhile, were tolerated in their use of "Calgary" as the lower rocker, while the Saskatchewan Rebels, at that point being the dominant club in that province, flew "Saskatchewan" as their lower rocker.

In the late 1970s and early 1980s (the golden era in western Canada for independent one-percenter clubs), the Rebels were the dominant club in the Edmonton area, while the Reapers were the largest club in Red Deer and Calgary.

In 1977, the Kings Crew was established and quickly became a major player in Alberta, especially Calgary. During this time they would align themselves with the Rebels Motorcycle Club, who had also become an enemy of the Grim Reapers Motorcycle Club. In the 1980s they would become much more involved in the Alberta biker conflict.

Note: see Criminal allegations and Incidents for Kings Crew involvement in conflict

The conflict would ultimately come to an end when all major parties patched over to the Hells Angels in the late 1990s.

== Criminal activities and incidents ==
In February, 1983. For aligning with their main rivals in the province the Rebels MC. Members of the Grim Reapers Motorcycle Club would steal the "Cuts" off of five members of the Kings Crew Motorcycle Club at gunpoint. They were set on fire and delivered to the offices of the Calgary newspaper.

In March, 1983. Multiple assault-rifle bullets are shot at the Grim Reapers Calgary Chapter clubhouse. It is believed that the attack was carried out by the Kings Crew MC.

On April 13, 1983. The Kings Crew clubhouse is targeted by a bombing. The building is destroyed.

On April 27, 1983. Kings Crew Motorcycle Club President, Melvin Jordan's house is bombed, fifteen rounds from an assault rifle struck the property, he survived the attempt.

On May 16, 1983. Full patch member of the Grim Reapers, Larry Graham's car is bombed. Kings Crew members are suspected of the bombing

On June 8, 1983. Turning allegiances after the assassination attempt out of fear for his life, now Kings Crew affiliate Larry Graham and his wife are the victims of an attempted kidnapping. Larry Graham is struck in the head with a firearm.

On June 10, 1983. Kings Crew Ronald “Wrongway” Moore is assassinated. His jeep was rigged with an explosive and exploded when he tried to start the vehicle.

On July 30, 1983. The “Southside Harley and Speed” a motorcycle shop, owned by Grim Reapers members in Edmonton, Alberta, is bombed and destroyed. Kings Crew Motorcycle Club members are suspected.

On December 18, 1983. James St Pierre member of the Kings Crew arrives at the hospital with multiple stab wounds. It is believed to be members of the Grim Reapers that were responsible.

On January 22, 1984. Kings Crew member Steven Albert Joell is killed outside of his home. Grim Reapers are accused of the shooting.

In April 1984. Member of the Kings Crew, Wayne Jordan was exiting a store when two Grim Reapers approached him and pointed firearm at him. He ran into the store and called the authorities, identifying the opposing Club members who were placed in police custody. The Kings Crew Motorcycle Club kicked him out of the club for informing police.

On August 13, 1984. Grim Reapers member David Worshek is hospitalized by Kings Crew members.

On July 26, 1987. Kings Crew member Richard Moyes is knocked unconscious by Michael Doll, Kerry Eastman and Derek Smith. Members of the Grim Reapers Motorcycle Club, they took his "Cut".

On October 1, 1987. Full patch member of Kings Crew Louis Aaron Blatt is reported missing by his wife Valerie Blatt. It is assumed that the Grim Reapers had taken him and murdered him, disposed of the body. It was believed by local authorities that the body was disposed of without a trace to stop the Kings Crew club from claiming the $50,000 life insurance policy payout.

The Kings Crew were listed as an Outlaw Motorcycle Gang by Criminal Intelligence Service Canada.
