= Crazy Dragons =

Canadian street gang

The Crazy Dragons gang are a street gang active in the Prairie provinces of Canada.

== Origins ==
The Crazy Dragons gang was founded in Edmonton and has since spread all over Alberta. The Crazy Dragons were the successor gang to the Vietnamese Trang gang, which folded after a series of convictions of its members in 2002. The majority of the founding members of the Crazy Dragons were Vietnamese-Canadians. Tom Engel, an Edmonton lawyer who defended 26 members of the Trang gang arrested in 1999 stated in 2011: "Out of that came a gang called the Crazy Dragons, and those guys didn’t mind violence at all".

The gang was primarily Asian-Canadian when it was founded, but as is often the case with ethno-centric Canadian gangs has become more diverse over time, taking in many white members. Likewise, the gang was all male at the time of its foundation, but by the beginning of the 21st century had taken in a number of females, mostly young women. In 2004, the Crazy Dragons first attracted media attention when the gang kidnapped and beat up five members of the White Boy Posse, a white supremacist gang. Later in 2004, David Thanh Lam of the Crazy Dragons was involved in a drive-by shooting in Blue River when a couple from Abbotsford had their car shot up and were then robbed. In a plea bargain with the Crown in July 2006, Lam pleaded guilty to robbery in exchange for the Crown dropping the charges of attempted murder against him.

== Expansion ==
During a gang war in Calgary between two Asian-Canadian gangs, the Fresh Off the Boat gang and the Fresh Off the Boat Killers, the Crazy Dragons served as gunrunners, selling guns to the Fresh Off the Boat gang. By 2005, the Crazy Dragons had moved into Saskatchewan. In 2006, Inspector John Cantafio of the Royal Canadian Mounted Police told the media: "They could see there was a bit of a vacuum here in Saskatchewan. They moved in here last fall in Regina and Saskatoon". The Crazy Dragons in Saskatchewan were described as engaged in "diel-a-dope" operations of selling cocaine, methamphetamine and marijuana via cell phones and texting. In August 2006, 13 members of the Crazy Dragons were arrested in Regina on charges of gangsterism, trafficking in cocaine, conspiracy to traffic in cocaine and living off the proceeds of crime. Cantafio admitted to the media that the Mounties were hapless in the face of the Crazy Dragons as the arrests had failed to dent the growth of the Crazy Dragons.

In July 2007, Criminal Intelligence Service Canada in a report stated: ""The most noticeable criminal group in Alberta-with cocaine operations throughout the province as well as in parts of British Columbia, Saskatchewan and the Northwest Territories-is known to police as the Crazy Dragons...Among competing groups there is one that surpasses all the others with their drug products being provided in some measure to virtually every reporting city and town, even in the midst of activities by other criminal groups". The Crazy Dragons primarily sell cocaine imported from Los Angeles via Vancouver into communities in the Prairie provinces, the near north and the far north of Canada. A police report in 2009 described the Crazy Dragons as one of the "most sophisticated" gangs in Alberta with chapters in nearly every Alberta city and town. In November 2014, the Crazy Dragons attracted attention when one of their leaders, David Thanh Lam, was found murdered in Langley. By 2012, the Crazy Dragons in Alberta were described as more powerful than the Hells Angels in that province. The Crazy Dragons were reported as being active in the Lower Mainland, but unlike in Alberta, the Crazy Dragons in British Columbia were described as subordinate to the Hells Angels.

== Books ==
- Totten, Mark (2012). Nasty, Brutish, and Short The Lives of Gang Members in Canada. Toronto: James Lorimer Publishers. ISBN 9781459400399.
