= Galloping Goose =

Galloping Goose may refer to:

- Galloping Goose Regional Trail, bicycling and pedestrian trail in British Columbia, Canada
- Galloping Goose Motorcycle Club, America's first backpatch motorcycle club
- Galloping Goose (railcar), aka railbus, or "motor", as officially designated by Rio Grande Southern
