= BFMC =

BFMC may refer to:

- Black Foreign Mission Convention, one of three precursor conventions that merged to form the National Baptist Convention, USA, Inc.
- Boozefighters Motorcycle Club
- Battlefield 2: Modern Combat
