= Rebels Motorcycle Club (Canada) =

Outlaw motorcycle club in Canada

- Rebels Motorcycle Club
- Founded: 1968
- Founding location: Red Deer, Alberta, Canada
- Years active: 1968–2004
- Territory: Northern Alberta, Southern Alberta, Saskatchewan and Ontario
- Membership (est.): 70+
- Allies: Satan's Choice, Kings Crew Motorcycle Club, Lobos and, later, the Hells Angels
- Rivals: Grim Reapers, Warlocks Motorcycle Club (Florida), EPS, RCMP, Canadian Airborne Regiment

The Rebels Motorcycle Club was an outlaw motorcycle club based in Western Canada that was founded in Red Deer, Alberta in 1968. It was one of the three dominant motorcycle clubs in the province of Alberta during the 1970s-1990s

Along with the Grim Reapers, Warlords Motorcycle Club, and Kings Crew Motorcycle Club, the Rebels became one of the four dominant outlaw motorcycle clubs operating in Alberta prior to 1997. By 1997, when the Grim Reapers became part of the Hells Angels in a patch-over ceremony held in Red Deer, Alberta, and after merging with the Loners Motorcycle Club of Saskatchewan in the 1980s, the Rebels possessed five chapters Edmonton, Calgary, Moose Jaw, and Saskatoon and Toronto.

In the late 1970s and early 1980s (the golden era in western Canada for independent one-percenter clubs), the Rebels were the dominant club in the Edmonton area, while the Reapers were the alpha club in Red Deer and Calgary. Throughout the 1970s the Rebels had multiple violent exchanges with their main rivals in the province- the Grim Reapers Motorcycle Club. Most of the clashes occurred off of the authorities' radar and received little media attention The 1970s would prove to be an extremely dominant period for the club, which maintained an "iron fisted territorial policy" that saw them battle for dominance in the province against several other groups. Since the club's creation in 1968, it either defeated or absorbed 13 separate clubs in Alberta. Their "cuts" were taken and displayed upside down on the walls of the Rebels Mother Chapter clubhouse

In 1975, the Rebels gained a certain level of notoriety (respect in some circles) due to their publicised conflicts with Francophone unit of Canadian Airborne Regiment known as "One Commando". In one of these infamous clashes, about 40 members of the Airborne showed up with nunchaku, steel bars, baseball bats, and blackjacks, and ambushed 23 Rebels at the club bar in Edmonton. After a skirmish, the bruised and battered paratroopers retreated and the Rebels went back to their business. This event came to be known as "Battle of the Kingsway" in Rebel Folklore. In 1978, the Rebels only chapter in Ontario was established by Frank Lenti and Gennaro Raso, this would only last until 1979 when the chapter became part of the newly formed Loners Motorcycle Club.

In the early eighties, as the Reapers grew more powerful and the Rebels less so, the Rebels were warned by the Reapers not to fly the "Alberta" lower rocker on threat of club warfare, so members of the Rebel's Calgary chapter used "Southern Alberta" for the lower rocker and Edmonton members flew "Northern Alberta". King's Crew, meanwhile, were tolerated in their use of "Calgary" as the lower rocker, while the Saskatchewan Rebels, at that point being the dominant club in that province, flew "Saskatchewan" as their lower rocker. In September 1998, the Saskatoon Rebels were patched over to the Hells Angels and the Apollos of Regina became the primary Hells Angels support club there.

The Edmonton chapter of the Rebels folded in 1997, soon after the arrest of secretary-treasurer Scott Jamieson but reopened soon after, however many of its former members joined the Angels. In 1998 the Rebels Saskatoon Chapter were patched over by the Hells Angels. In October 2001, Joey "Crazy Horse" Morin, Vice President acting on behalf of Pete Sorenson (president) for the Edmonton chapter of the Rebels Motorcycle Club, first contacted the Bandidos with the aim of "patching over", this was the only remaining chapter of the Rebels at the time that had not patched over to the Hells Angels. At a party at Kellestine's farm, Morin and the other Rebels were not impressed with Kellestine's eccentric behavior, seeing the Bandido treasurer Luis "Chopper" Raposo get high on various drugs and a "coked out" Muscedere lose his temper and beat up one of his "brothers" over a trivial matter.

In 2004, Joey "Crazy Horse" Morin, a.k.a. Joey Campbell, a former associate of the Edmonton chapter of the Rebels, and Robert Charles Simpson, were gunned down outside an Edmonton strip club. At the time of the murders, the Bandidos website identified Morin as a probationary member and Simpson as a hangaround. Sources close to the investigation speculated at the time that Morin and Simpson were in Edmonton to set up shop, and the murders were committed by a group (Hells Angels) opposed to that happening. To date, no arrests have been made and the file is still officially open and active.

The Rebels were listed as an Outlaw Motorcycle Gang by Criminal Intelligence Service Canada.
