= ACII =

ACII may refer to:

- Affective Computing and Intelligent Interaction
- Assassin's Creed II, a 2009 action-adventure video game
- The Chartered Insurance Institute's Advanced Diploma in Insurance

== See also ==
- Oliver Acii, Ugandan sprinter
- ACIIS, the Automated Criminal Intelligence Information System
- ASCII, the American Standard Code for Information Interchange
