= Market Street Commandos =

California motorcycle club

The Market Street Commandos was an outlaw motorcycle club that, in 1947, along with the Boozefighters and the Pissed Off Bastards of Bloomington, participated in the highly publicized Hollister incident (later immortalized on film as The Wild One). In 1954 the Market Street Commandos merged with the Hells Angels to become their San Francisco chapter.
