= Pissed Off Bastards of Bloomington =

California motorcycle club

- Formation: 1945
- Founder: Norman Briggs
- Founded at: Bloomington, California, U.S.
- Type: Outlaw motorcycle club
- Purpose: Outlaw motorcycle and car club
- Region served: California and Nevada, US
- Website: www.POBOBMC.com

The Pissed Off Bastards of Bloomington (POBOB) is an outlaw motorcycle club that, in 1947, along with the Boozefighters and the Market Street Commandos, participated in the highly publicized Hollister riot, later immortalized in the film The Wild One (1953).

== History ==
The POBOB was among the earliest motorcycle and car clubs in California; they were established a few miles west of San Bernardino, California, in the small town of Bloomington in 1945.

Then on July 4, 1947, in Hollister, California where the American Motorcycle Association (AMA) sanctioned the Gypsy Tour Run, the Boozefighters, POBOB and the Market Street Commandos took over the town for nearly three days. The POBOB members played an integral role in the Hollister riot, on which the movie The Wild One was based, starring Marlon Brando.

Two months later, the same clubs went to Riverside, California for the Labor Day weekend, another AMA-sanctioned event. The same thing happened again as it did in Hollister. Over four thousand people, including bikers from out of town and local residents, took over the town's main street. A Riverside sheriff, Carl Rayburn, blamed a bunch of punk kids for disrupting his town, saying "They're rebels, they're outlaws."

In 1948, the AMA supposedly made a statement that ninety-nine percent of the motorcyclists are good people enjoying a clean sport and it is the one percent that are anti-social barbarians. The term "one percenter" is born.

Three years later the P.O.B.O.B. MC came back as a motorcycle club (minus the car club), in the city of Fontana known as Felony Flats. The club still exists today with a large group of members known as the Pissed Off Bastards of Berdoo, throughout California and Nevada and Utah.

Their colors are red and blue, with red commemorating bloodshed and blue representing loyalty. The back patch consists of a top rocker (p.o.b.o.b.). The center patch features a character named Ace: a skull wearing a bomber hat. The bottom rocker shows the state of origin of the Patchholder. The club motto is PFFP (P.O.B.O.B Forever Forever P.O.B.O.B)

One former Pissed Off Bastards member, Otto Friedli, is credited with founding the Hells Angels in Fontana after breaking from the POBOB over a feud with a rival gang.
