= WBP =

WBP may refer to:

- West Bengal Police, one of the two police forces of the Indian state of West Bengal
- West Brompton station, London, National Rail station code
- Western Block Party, a defunct Canadian federal political party
- White Boy Posse, a Canadian white supremacist neo-Nazi organized crime group
- WBP Glue Line, a glue used for marine plywood fabrication
- Warner Bros. Pictures, an American film production and distribution arm of Warner Bros. Motion Picture Group
