= Warlocks Motorcycle Club (Florida) =

International outlaw motorcycle club

Warlocks MC
- Abbreviation: WMC; Florida Warlocks; Phoenix Warlocks
- Founded: 1967; 59 years ago
- Founder: Tom "Grub" Freeland
- Founded at: Jacksonville Beach, Florida, U.S.
- Type: Outlaw motorcycle club
- Headquarters: Orlando, Florida, U.S.
- Region served: International (55 chapters in 4 countries)
- Website: warlocks-mc.com

The Warlocks Motorcycle Club, also sometimes distinguished as the Phoenix Warlocks or the Florida Warlocks, is an international outlaw motorcycle club that was founded in 1967 in Florida, United States by ex-US naval servicemen serving on the aircraft carrier USS Shangri-La. It is a "One Percenter motorcycle club" with chapters in various parts of the United States, Canada, England, and Germany. Established by Tom "Grub" Freeland, an ex-US Navy veteran in Orlando, Florida, in 1967. The Mother Chapter is still located there. The club's founder, Tom "Grub" Freeland, died in 2019.

== History ==
In February 1967, thirteen sailors aboard the U.S.S. Shangri-La were on an eight month deployment with the Sixth Fleet in the Mediterranean Sea. Among them was the future club's founder, Thomas Freeland, also known as Grub. All of them, being motorcycle enthusiasts, and discussing plans on what to do after returning home, discussed forming a motorcycle club together. One suggested the name Warlocks and one designed the Phoenix logo. They then made plans, that each of the thirteen new brothers would found a chapter in his hometown after retiring from the Navy. With most of the members, the euphoria passed very quickly after their return from service. But one brother, who took this commitment seriously enough to make this dream a reality, was Grub from Lockhart, Florida. The original chapter he founded was on the outskirts of Orlando, where the club's mother chapter remains to this day.

On February 21, 1991, Raymond "Bear" Chaffin, president of the club’s Smyrna Beach, Florida chapter, was shot to death in his garage. Chaffin was in talks to merge interests with the Hells Angels down in Florida, as well as in talks with the Boozefighters about patching over into the Warlocks, which would have made them one of the largest motorcycle clubs in the world at the time. The ATF would later use his funeral as an opportunity for a raid to arrest members of the club after the end of a 13 month long sting operation led by ATF agent Stephen Martin.

== Global Charters ==
The Warlocks have chapters in four countries, most of which are active in the United States. There are fourteen chapters in Florida, seven in South Carolina, five in Virginia, four in West Virginia, three in Georgia, two in Ohio, three in New York, five in New Jersey, One in Connecticut, one in Indiana, two in Minnesota, one in Michigan, two in Canada (one frozen), four in England, and two in Germany and their growth continues. There are also several Nomads who live and work in states that do not have Warlocks chapters.

== Insignia ==
The club's insignia is a blazing Phoenix between a top and bottom rocker, their colors are crimson red, yellow and black. Mottos include "Our Business is None of Your Fucking Business" and "Warlocks forever, forever Warlocks" ("W.F.F.W.").

== Criminal allegations and incidents ==
=== United States ===
The Warlocks are considered by law enforcement to be among the many second-tier, after the "Big Four", outlaw motorcycle gangs. The Warlocks have a rivalry with the Outlaws and the Pagans.

The Warlocks were investigated by the Bureau of Alcohol, Tobacco, Firearms and Explosives (ATF) in 1991, after Stephen Martin, an undercover agent, infiltrated the club. Several members were subsequently arrested and released. It was made clear by all involved outside of law enforcement that none of the illegal activities would have ever transpired without being initiated by Stephen Martin. Again, in 2003 the ATF investigated the Warlocks, and convicted several members of drug and weapon charges once more. Steven Brown known as “Steve-O” was convicted of trafficking 400 grams or more of methamphetamine by a Lexington County jury in South Carolina. He was sentenced to 25 years in prison.

=== Canada ===
Several Warlocks bikers and associates were arrested in the small town of Drayton Valley in Alberta, Canada town in March 2014 on weapons charges.

== See also ==
- Motorcycling
