= Grim Reapers Motorcycle Club (Canada) =

Outlaw motorcycle club in Alberta, Canada

Grim Reapers MC
- Grim Reapers Motorcycle Club, Alberta colours
- Founded: 1967
- Founding location: Alberta, Canada
- Years active: 1967–1997
- Territory: Western Canada
- Criminal activities: drug trafficking, murder, assault, extortion
- Allies: Hells Angels
- Rivals: Kings Crew, Rebels, Outcasts, Warlords, RCMP

The Grim Reapers Motorcycle Club was an outlaw motorcycle club, founded in 1967 in Calgary, Alberta, that was active during the 1960s and 1970s; it grew to become a dominant club in the region during the 1980s and 1990s.

They were apparently independent of a US-based motorcycle club of the same name that was founded in 1965 in Louisville, Kentucky. Along with the Rebels, the Warlords, and King's Crew, they were one of the four dominant outlaw motorcycle clubs operating in Alberta prior to 1997. In 1997, the club became part of the Hells Angels in a patch-over ceremony held in Red Deer, Alberta.

In 1970, 11 members and 2 associates were sentenced to life in prison for the murder of Ronald Hartley, president of the Outcasts Motorcycle Club. After an appeal several members were released and others had their sentences reduced. Two members were eventually convicted and sentenced to life in prison for the murder.

The Grim Reapers were listed as an "Outlaw Motorcycle Gang" by Criminal Intelligence Service Canada. In 1997, primarily because of public outcry due to escalating violence in eastern Canada between the Rock Machine and the Hells Angels' Quebec chapters, the Canadian government passed Bill C-95 which amended the Criminal Code (and other legislation) to give Canadian law enforcement organizations powers similar to those provided to their American counterparts via RICO.

Several former members of the Reapers, later to become members of the Hells Angels' Western Canadian chapters, were eventually successful in their challenge of charges brought against them under the new legislation as a result of events that occurred in relation to their patch-over gathering in Red Deer. In 2005, the bikers in Alberta won a major court victory when a judge ruled that police violated their constitutional rights during a roadside check in 1997.
