= Patrick Champoux =

Canadian gangster and outlaw biker (born 1966)

Patrick Champoux (born 1966), better known as "Big Pat", is a Canadian gangster and outlaw biker.

== St. John's crime boss ==
Champoux arrived in St. John's from Montreal in 2004. The journalist Jerry Langton wrote: "Big Pat kept his intimidating presence large. He'd enter bars and help himself to beer, daring the owners to stop him...According to the Royal Newfoundland Constabulary and a CBC documentary on the situation, he did everything short of renting a billboard to advertise the fact that he was the town's dominant drug dealer". Champoux established himself as the most powerful gangster in St. John's, being involved in a number of assaults and smashing up bars that refused to pay him extortion money.

Together with his girlfriend, Sonia Delisle, Champoux owned and operated Bubbles Gentleman Club on George Street, a strip-club that was notorious for the rowdy elements it attracted. The club was charged with violating the Criminal Code's outlawing of "immoral theatrical performance" after one stripper from Montreal, Marie-Andrée Lauriault, allowed 177 men to penetrate her vagina with a dildo she handed out. One man at Bubbles accused of being a police officer was beaten and thrown out from the second floor, an incident that left him paralyzed. The amount of cocaine being sold in St. John's and Newfoundland in general increased along with a rise in petty crime after Champoux's arrival. Sergeant Marlene Jesso of the Royal Newfoundland Constabulary told the media: "Another big thing in the city right now is home invasions and that's drug dealers ripping off other drug dealers for money and drugs". Champoux eventually returned to Montreal, but left behind another Hells Angel, Patrick "Little Pat" Dickson to manage his operations in St. John's.

Champoux and Dickson recruited two local criminals, John Stanley and Mark Kane, to assist with their operations. The Royal Newfoundland Constabulary set up a secret video camera in Stanley's house where he kept an average of $10, 000-$20, 000 in cash at anytime. Stanley also kept money in safehouses in Portugal Cove, Mount Pearl and in other apartments he rented in St. John's. The Royal Newfoundland Constabulary found in Stanley's apartment a kilogram of cocaine that had been purchased in Montreal two days before.

== Operation Roadrunner ==
As part of Operation Roadrunner, Champoux was videotaped during his visits to St. John's handing over packages of cocaine to Dickson. In September 2007, Dickson was observed by the police picking up cocaine that had arrived via a Cessna airplane that landed at Bell Island airport. The Cessna had left Montreal, flown low for the entire voyage and had its transponder turned off. Upon landing, the pilot threw several boxes off the plane and then took off while Dickson placed the boxes in his mini-van. The pilot stayed so briefly at the Bell island that he never turned off the engine on the Cessna. The police believed that the Champoux gang was importing about $1 million of cocaine into Newfoundland per month and were the largest drug dealers in the province. Champoux, Dickson, Stanley and Kane went through 60 different cell phones over a three-month period in an effort to confuse the police.

On 11 October 2007, the Royal Newfoundland Constabulary arrested 12 people in connection with the Champoux gang and seized 9 kilograms of cocaine. Champoux was in Quebec at the time of the raid. When the police raided his Montreal house, they found Delise and Marc-André Hinse, the former president of the Hells Angels Trois-Rivières chapter who had been a fugitive from justice since 2004. Champoux was arrested in Lu Tuque, Quebec in May 2008. Eric Vecchio, a detective with the Service de police de la Ville de Montréal had gone fishing with his girlfriend and in the small town of Lu Tuque happened to see Champoux at the gas station, where he arrested him. In 2009, Champoux was sentenced to five years in prison.

== Books ==
- Langton, Jerry (2015). Cold War How Organized Crime Works in Canada and Why It's About to Get More Violent. Toronto: HarperColllins. ISBN 978-1-4434-3255-9.
