= Criminal intelligence =

Information gathering to prevent or monitor criminal activity

Criminal intelligence is information compiled, analyzed, and/or disseminated in an effort to anticipate, prevent, or monitor criminal activity.

The United States Army Military Police Corps defines criminal intelligence as information gathered or collated, analyzed, recorded/reported and disseminated by law enforcement agencies concerning types of crime, identified criminals and known or suspected criminal groups.

It is particularly useful to deal with organized crime. Criminal intelligence is developed by using surveillance, informants, interrogation, and research, or it may be just picked up on the "street" by individual police officers.

Some larger law enforcement agencies have a department, division or section specifically designed to gather disparate pieces of information and develop criminal intelligence. One of the most effective ways of applying criminal intelligence is first to record it (store in a computer system), which can be "mined" (searched) for specific information.

== US Army usage ==
Criminal intelligence:

CRIMINT is the result of the collection, analysis, and interpretation of all available information concerning known and potential criminal threats and vulnerabilities of supported organizations. Army law enforcement agencies are the primary liaison representatives of the Army to federal, state, local, and host nation (HN) agencies for exchanging police intelligence. They collect criminal intelligence (CRIMINT) and human intelligence (HUMINT) within the provisions of applicable statutes and regulations. Army law enforcement agencies have the capability to analyze and disseminate collected time-sensitive information concerning a criminal threat against Army interests. The value of such intelligence cannot be overemphasized; it not only serves the purpose of police investigations, it also contributes to the development of countermeasures to safeguard Army personnel, materials, information, and other resources.

== CRIMINT Process ==
The CRIMINT process is effective intelligence results from a series of interrelated activities. The intelligence process is a continuous process of collecting and converting data into intelligence products to be integrated into operations. The process consists of several phases with continuous evaluation and feedback at each phase and at the end of the process. With the minor modification of adding “reporting” to the second phase, the following text outlines the intelligence process as discussed in Army Regulation (AR) 525–13.

- CRIMINT planning and directing.
- CRIMINT collection and reporting.
- CRIMINT processing.
- Analysis and production.
- Dissemination and integration.

== Criminal intelligence analysis ==
Criminal intelligence analysis has been recognized by law enforcement as a useful support tool for over twenty-five years and is successfully used within the international community. International organizations, such as the International Police (INTERPOL), European Police (EUROPOL) and the International Criminal Tribunal for the former Yugoslavia (ICTY), and while there are many definitions of Criminal Intelligence Analysis in use throughout the world, the one definition agreed in June 1992 by an international group of twelve European INTERPOL member countries and subsequently adopted by other countries is as follows:

The identification of and provision of insight into the relationship between crime data and other potentially relevant data with a view to police and judicial practice.

As such, criminal intelligence is a more intense or specific application towards investigations than criminology.

== Criminal investigation analysis software ==
There are several techniques intended for criminal investigation analysis. One of them is link analysis which is dedicated to evaluate relationships between nodes.

== See also ==
- Intelligence Center for Counter-Terrorism and Organized Crime (Spain)
- Australian Criminal Intelligence Commission
- Automated Criminal Intelligence Information System (Canada)
- Police Intelligence (UK)
- Police Intelligence Operations
