= Yellow Jackets Motorcycle Club =

American motorcycle club

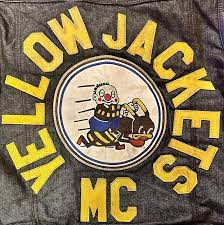

The Yellow Jackets Motorcycle Club, also referred to as YJMC, is an American Motorcycle Club, which in 1947 along with other California motorcycle clubs participated in the highly publicized "Hollister Riot" later immortalized in the film The Wild One. While the true founding date is lost to time for now, they were officially incorporated in 1947 and registered with the American Motorcyclist Association the very same year.

== History ==
The California-based Yellow Jackets Motorcycle Club, are an "Original Motorcycle Club". While the original founding date has been lost to time for now, the club was officially incorporated in 1947 and registered with the American Motorcyclist Association the same year. The Yellow Jackets Motorcycle Club is one of the oldest clubs still in existence in the United States.

They met at a small bar called The Crash Inn in Southern California. The owner of The Crash Inn was an honorary member according to the last surviving member of the club. Many different clubs were represented at The Crash Inn, and they would all laugh, drink, and have a good time together there, of course that was a much different time. The California-based Yellow Jackets were represented at the July 4th, 1947 Hollister, California Gypsy Tour. this became known as The Hollister Riot, depicted in the film The Wild One and often referenced as the birthplace of the American outlaw biker.

The Yellow Jackets MC is an American club, meaning that its membership is spread across the country, with multiple chapters in various cities. Formed for the love of Motorcyclism and racing motorcycles, the Yellow Jackets along with the other "Originals" set the stage for the development of the modern American motorcycle club. From its roots in the California motorcycle culture, the club began to spread eastward, growing its ranks with new members.

== Membership ==
To become a prospect, candidates must have an American or allied motorcycle, 750cc or larger, valid license and insurance and the sponsorship of a full patched member. After a potential member is invited to ride and party with the club, he is deemed a “hang-around”, indicating that the individual is invited to club events and can associate with members. If a hang around is deemed appropriate and finds sponsorship he may be invited to join the club as a prospect. Prospective members wear a "PROSPECT" top rocker and a tab naming them as a prospect. once a member finishes prospecting he is allowed to wear the clubs full patches. Additionally, as the member progresses in the club he is given various patches that denote achievements within the organization.

== Colors ==
Yellow Jackets are identifiable by their patches or "colors". Each set of these patches will consist of all letters making up the name "Yellow Jackets MC" in a circle pattern around a center patch. The patches worn have great significance for each member and are earned through prospecting, or a type of probation.
