= Galloping Goose Motorcycle Club =

Motorcycle club

Galloping Goose MC
- Abbreviation: GG Bunch
- Founded: 1942
- Founder: Dick Hershberg
- Founded at: Los Angeles, California, U.S.
- Type: Outlaw motorcycle club
- Region served: Midwestern USA
- Website: socalggmc.wixsite.com

Galloping Goose Motorcycle Club (GGMC) is an outlaw motorcycle club that began around a motorcycle racing team and friends based in Los Angeles, California in the United States in 1942. The group was informal and not chartered until 1946. Soon after, the organization spread out from southern California, establishing chapters in Illinois, Missouri, Montana, Indiana, Wyoming, Kansas, Mississippi, Louisiana and Florida. The Galloping Goose are considered by law enforcement to be among the many second-tier, after the "Big Four", outlaw motorcycle gangs.

Members of the Galloping Goose MC were at the 1947 Hollister Rally which was the basis for the 1954 film The Wild One. This led to the beginning of the highly visible and structured 1% or outlaw motorcycle clubs, along with the Boozefighters MC when the AMA forbade club members to participate in AMA events unless they took off their patches. Original members of the club had a MC shop in Jacksonville and raced in numerous events including the Daytona race when it was still run on the beach.

The club has a close relationship with El Forastero Motorcycle Club.

An expert on outlaw motorcycle gangs from Missouri State Highway Patrol said the Galloping Goose were expanding into territory formerly controlled by the Pharaohs motorcycle club during the 1980s and 1990s. He described them as a "one percenter club", which created their first support club name "Vieux-Doo Dawgs M.C." This was established in Louisiana dated 1998. Once established it took over another club, the Midwest Drifters, and uses them to run errands and provide cash. He said Galloping Goose rules of behavior sometimes include violent crimes.
