= Automated Criminal Intelligence Information System =

The Automated Criminal Intelligence Information System (ACIIS) is a Canadian on-line computer application established in 1976.

This database is the national intelligence repository for the use of all Criminal Intelligence Service Canada members in Canada. All member agencies cooperate with each other in the collection, collation, evaluation, analysis and dissemination of criminal intelligence by contributing to ACIIS.

== See also ==
- Criminal intelligence
