= Hollister riot =

1947 motorcycle rally

- Eddie Davenport of Tulare, California on a motorcycle, with Gus Deserpa standing at left, outside 526 San Benito Street, Hollister, California, on July 7, 1947. Photo by San Francisco Chronicle's Barney Petersen.
- Date: July 4, 1947–July 6, 1947
- Location: Hollister, California
- Also known as: 1947 Hollister Gypsy Tour
- Participants: 2,000 to 4,000 attendees, including about 750 motorcyclists. Members of the American Motorcyclist Association, Boozefighters, Pissed Off Bastards of Bloomington and other motorcycle clubs

The Hollister riot, also known as the Hollister Invasion, was an event that occurred at the American Motorcyclist Association (AMA)-sanctioned Gypsy Tour motorcycle rally in Hollister, California, from July 3 to 6, 1947.

More motorcyclists than expected flooded the small town to watch the annual rallies, as well as socialize and drink. A few of the motorcyclists caused a commotion in the town.

The incident, known afterward as the Hollister riot, was sensationalized by the press with reports of bikers "taking over the town" and "pandemonium" in Hollister. The strongest dramatization of the event was a photo of a drunken man sitting on a motorcycle, possibly staged by the photographer by surrounding the scene with discarded beer bottles. It was published in Life magazine, and it brought national attention and negative opinion to the event. The Hollister riot helped to give rise to the outlaw biker image.

== Rise of motorcycles after World War II ==
After World War II, many veterans returned to the United States and Canada and struggled to readjust to civilian life. Some found civilian life felt too monotonous after the excitement and danger of wartime. Others sought the close bonds and camaraderie found between men in the military. Thus, motorcycling and motorcycle clubs grew significantly after WWII as many found it provided the adrenaline and community they craved.

== Event ==
Fifth and San Benito

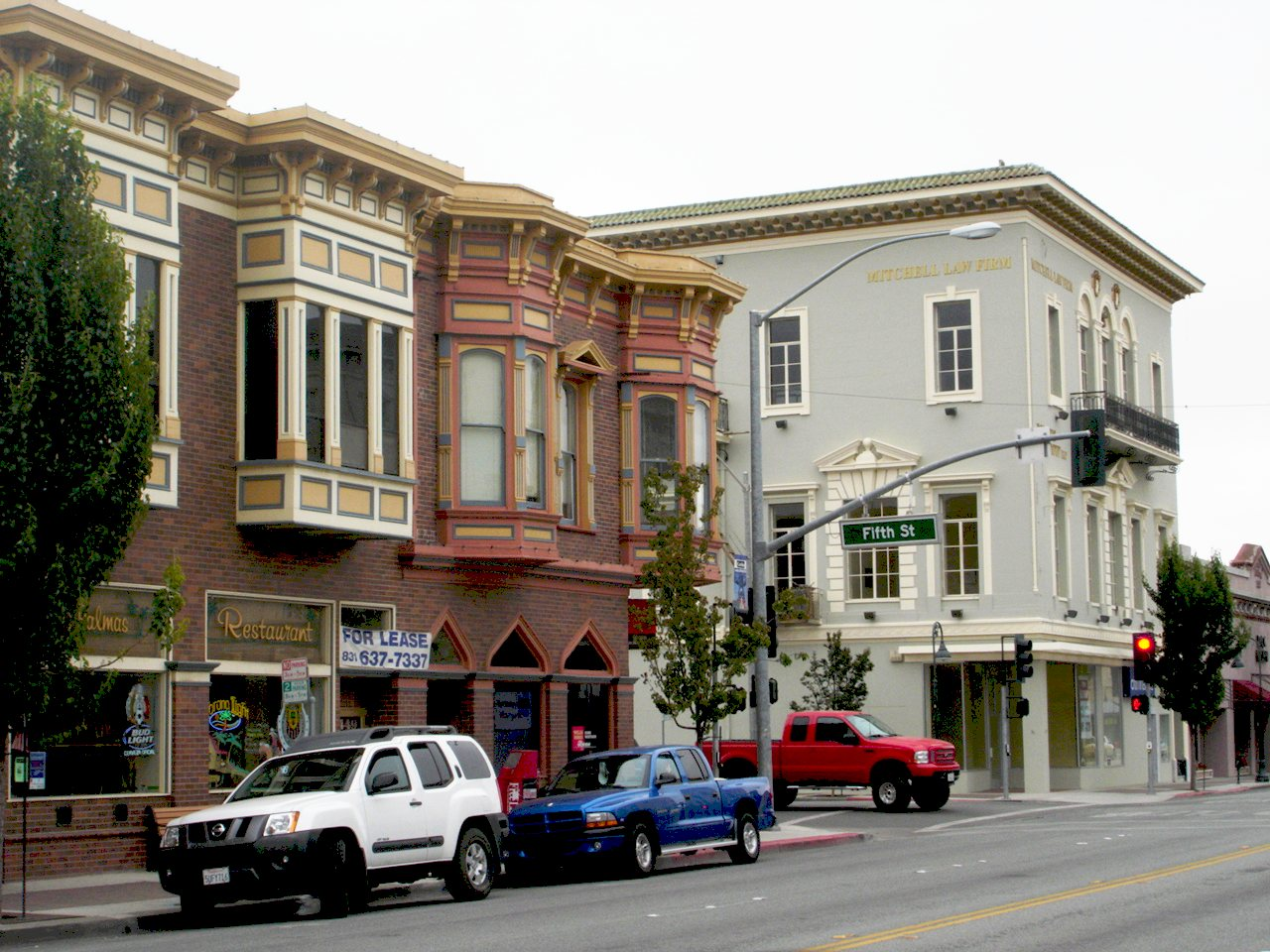
Looking north from the east side of San Benito Street at Fifth Street, in 2007. Many of the arrests took place in front of the building on the left.

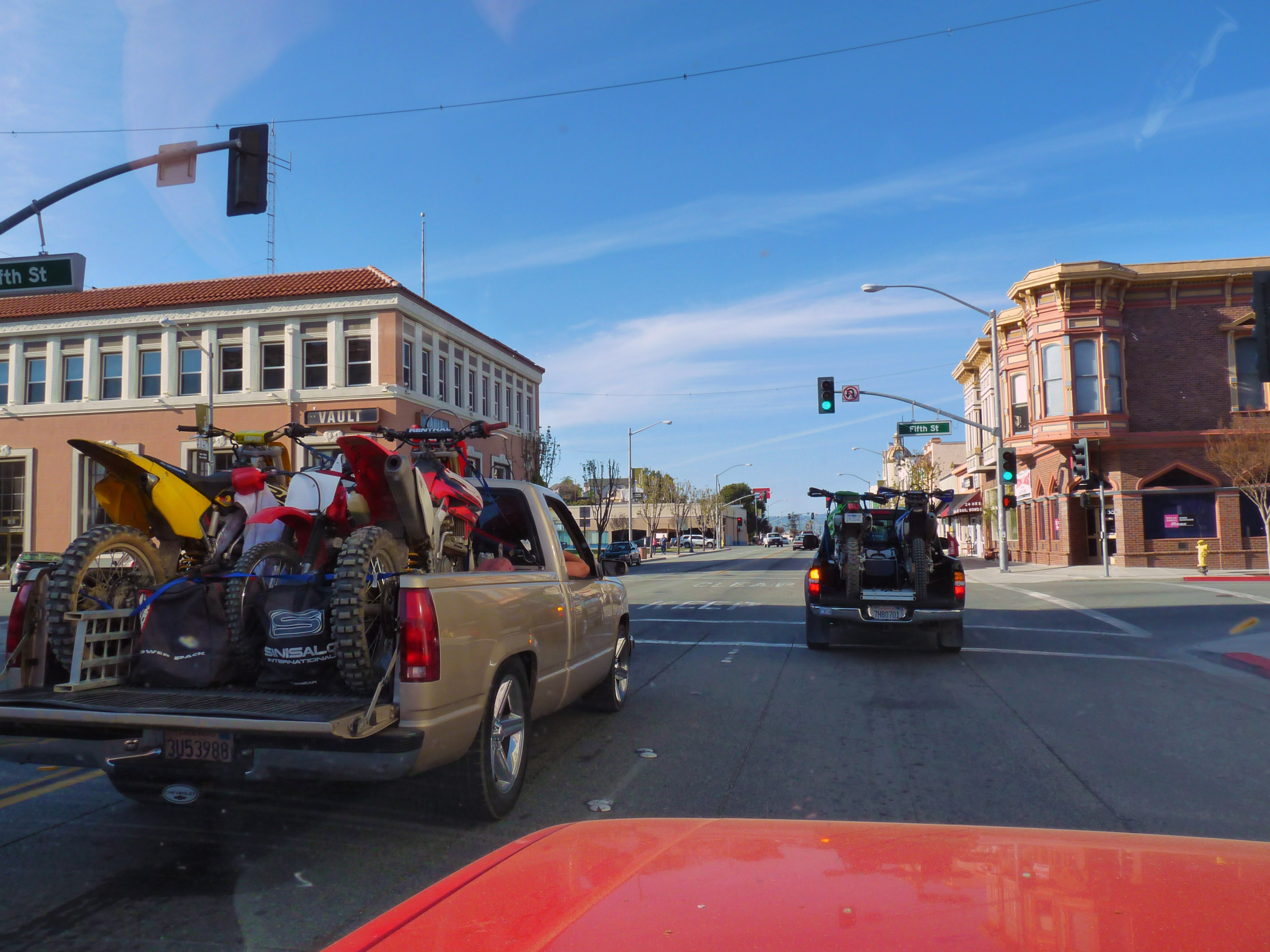
Driving south on San Benito Street toward Fifth Street in 2009. This street was the scene of drag races and motorcycle stunts.

The San Francisco Chronicle reported: "Armed with tear gas guns, the officers herded the cyclists into a block on San Benito Street, between Fifth and Sixth Streets, parked a dance band on a truck and ordered the musicians to play."

Throughout the 1930s, Hollister, California, hosted an annual Fourth of July gypsy tour event. Gypsy tours were American Motorcyclist Association-sanctioned racing events held across America and were considered the best place for motorcyclists to converge. The annual event consisted of motorcycle races, social activities, and partying. In Hollister, the event and the motorcyclists were welcome, especially because Hollister was a very small town with only about 4,500 people; the rally became a major event in its yearly life as well as an important part of the town's economy. Due to World War II, the rally was canceled, but the event organized for 1947 was the revival of the Gypsy Tour in Hollister.

On July 3, 1947, festivities in Hollister began. However, the popularity of motorcycles had grown dramatically, and this surge in popularity led to massive attendance, a major issue. Around 4,000 motorcyclists flooded Hollister, almost doubling the population of the small town. They came from all over California and the United States, even from as far away as Connecticut and Florida. Motorcycle groups in attendance included the 13 Rebels, Pissed Off Bastards of Bloomington, the Boozefighters, the Market Street Commandos, the Top Hatters Motorcycle Club, and the Galloping Goose Motorcycle Club. Approximately ten percent of attendees were women. The town was completely unprepared for the number of people that arrived, since not as many people had participated in the pre-war years.

Initially, the motorcyclists were welcomed into the Hollister bars, as the influx of people led to a boom in business. But soon, drunken motorcyclists were riding their bikes through the small streets of Hollister and consuming large amounts of alcohol. They were fighting, damaging bars, throwing beer bottles out of windows, racing in the streets, and other drunken actions. There was also a severe housing problem. The bikers had to sleep on sidewalks, in parks, in haystacks and on people's lawns. By the evening of July 4, "they were virtually out of control". Some motorcyclists even continued to be rowdy around young women in their 20s or 30s or teenage girls, ages 16-19, walking by.

The small, seven-man police force of Hollister was overwhelmed by the events. The police tried to stop the motorcyclists' activities by threatening to use tear gas and arresting as many drunken men as possible. The bars tried to stop the men from drinking by refusing to sell beer and by voluntarily closing two hours early.

Eyewitnesses were quoted as saying, "It's just one hell of a mess", but that "[the motorcyclists] weren't doing anything bad, just riding up and down whooping and hollering; not really doing any harm at all."

The ruckus continued through July 5 and slowly died out at the end of the weekend as the rallies ended and the motorcyclists left town.

At the end of the Fourth of July weekend and the informal riot, Hollister was littered with thousands of beer bottles and other debris, and there was some minor storefront damage. About 50 people were arrested, most with misdemeanors such as public intoxication, reckless driving, and disturbing the peace. There were around 60 reported injuries, of which three were serious, including a broken leg and skull fracture. Other than having to witness the chaos of the weekend, no Hollister residents suffered any physical harm. A City Council member stated, "Luckily, there appears to be no serious damage. These trick riders did more harm to themselves than the town."

== Media coverage ==
The riot gained national prominence through media coverage.

Shortly after the Fourth of July weekend, two articles were published in the San Francisco Chronicle. With titles "Havoc in Hollister" and "Hollister's Bad Time", they both described the event as "pandemonium" and "terrorism". The Chronicle article did little to cause panic for citizens in the California area as there were other news stories at the same time, including local labor strikes. The initial reporting reached a larger audience a few weeks later, with an article published in the July 21, 1947, issue of Life magazine. The article was published in the photojournalism section of Life, relying heavily on graphic images and explanatory text. This was shown as a single-page article, with a nearly full-page photo above a 115-word insert of text with the headline "Cyclist's Holiday: He and Friends Terrorize Town."

The large photo, taken by Barney Peterson of the San Francisco Chronicle, shows a drunken man, sitting atop a large motorcycle, holding a beer bottle in each hand and surrounded by many other empty, broken bottles. The man was later identified as Eddie Davenport, a member of the Tulare Riders motorcycle club.

The authenticity of the striking photo has been debated, with some sources suggesting the scene was staged. While the photograph was taken by Barney Petersen of the San Francisco Chronicle, the Chronicle did not run it, or any other images, in its initial two articles covering the event. The bearded individual standing in the immediate background of the photograph, Gus Deserpa, has said he is sure that the photograph was staged by Petersen, and gave the following account: "I saw two guys scraping all these bottles together, that had been lying in the street. Then they positioned a motorcycle in the middle of the pile. After a while this drunk guy comes staggering out of the bar, and they got him to sit on the motorcycle, and started to take his picture." Deserpa claims he deliberately tried to sabotage the staging by stepping into the shot, but to no avail.

Barney Peterson's colleague at the Chronicle, photographer Jerry Telfer, said it was implausible that Peterson would have faked the photos. Telfer said, "Barney was not the type to fake a picture. Barney was the kind of fellow who had a very keen sense of ethics, pictorial ethics as well as word ethics."

== Consequences ==
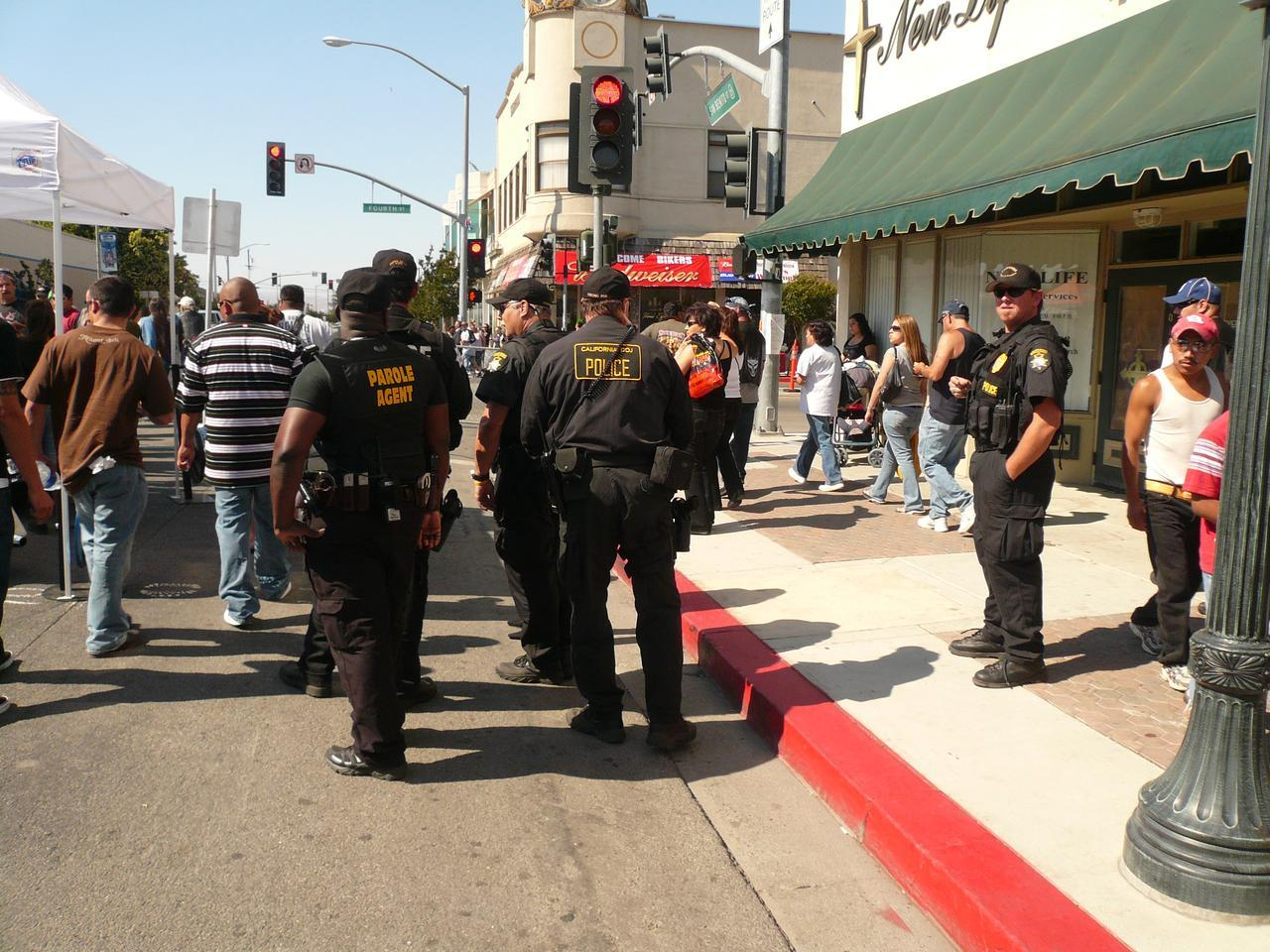
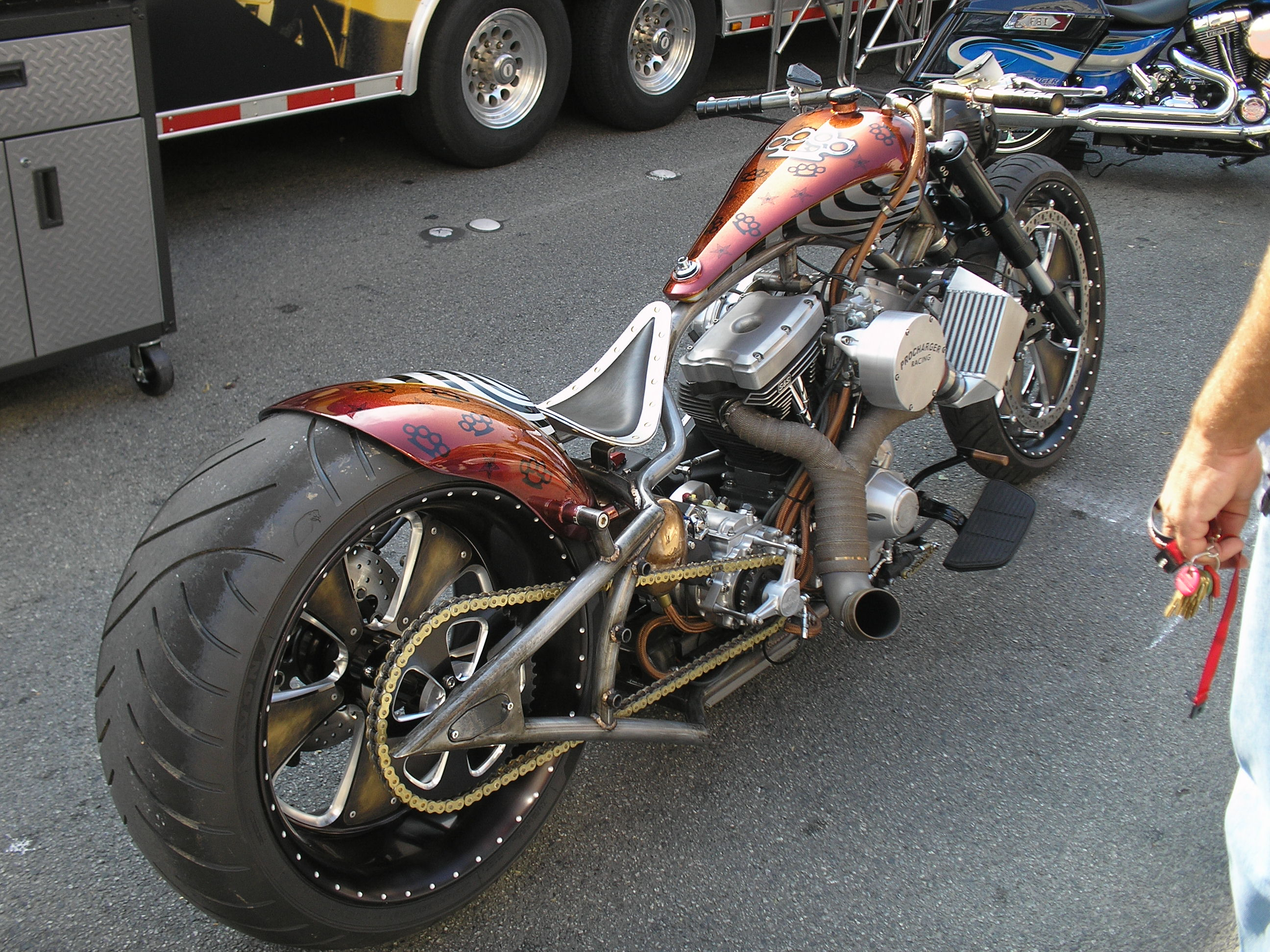
Modern Hollister continued to host motorcycle rallies and commemorate the events of July 1947.

The news of rogue motorcyclists causing havoc in small towns such as Hollister was not comforting to Americans still recovering from World War II and scared of the impending Cold War. The nation started to fear motorcycle "hoodlums" and potential rampages.

The Hollister riot had little effect on the town. The nationwide fear of motorcyclists did not result in many changes in Hollister. Bikers were welcomed back and rallies continued to be held in the years after the riot. In fact, the town held a 1997 50th anniversary rally to commemorate the event.

The one percenter iconography employed by outlaw motorcycle clubs stems from an apocryphal comment ostensibly made in 1960 by William Berry, a former president of the American Motorcyclist Association (AMA), that 99% of motorcyclists were law-abiding citizens, implying the last one percent were outlaws. The alleged AMA comment, supposedly in reference to the Hollister riot of 1947, is denied by the AMA, who claim to have no record of such a statement to the press and that the story is a misquote. (Note: In March 1972 (p.3), Chas Deane, the editor of Motorcycle Mechanics, wrote: Motorcycling is a way of life, almost a religion to some and the next best thing to breathing for others. There is no such thing as a "typical motorcyclist"; on the one hand we're outcasts and "one percenters", while on the other hand we are the "in" people.)

== Adaptations ==
A short story, "Cyclists' Raid" by Frank Rooney, is based on the events of the Hollister riot and was originally published in the January 1951 issue of Harper's Magazine.

The Hollister riot inspired the 1953 film The Wild One, starring Marlon Brando. While the film bears little resemblance to the actual events, it brought the incident into public light and introduced the popular image of motorcyclists as misfits and outlaws.
