= Criminal Intelligence Service Canada =

Canada's national intelligence organization

Criminal Intelligence Service Canada (CISC; French: Service canadien de renseignements criminels) is an inter-agency organization in Canada designed to coordinate and share criminal intelligence amongst member police forces. Established in 1970, the CISC has a central bureau in Ottawa and ten bureaus in each province offering services to over 400 law enforcement agencies in Canada.

The CISC also publishes an annual report on organized crime in Canada.

== Organization ==
There are three levels of membership in the CISC. Level I is for police forces responsible for federal and provincial law enforcement which have their own criminal intelligence unit. Level II is for member agencies that have a specific law enforcement role, e.g., the Canada Border Services Agency and Wildlife Service. Level III is for agencies that have a complementary role to law enforcement or give assistance to law enforcement. The level of membership is mirrored to membership with the Canadian Police Information Centre.

Intelligence units of member agencies supply their provincial bureau of the CISC with raw intelligence data, which is then added to an online database, Automated Criminal Intelligence Information System (ACIIS). The Ottawa Bureau is the custodian of the national database, and manages it in consultation with member agencies. The purpose of the CISC initiative is to not only coordinate information sharing across jurisdictions, but to facilitate investigations into organized and serious crime across Canada.

The central bureau is staffed by Royal Canadian Mounted Police employees along with secondments from the following agencies:

- Canada Border Services Agency
- Canadian Forces Military Police
- Ontario Provincial Police
- Royal Canadian Mounted Police
- Service de police de la Ville de Montréal
- Sûreté du Québec
- Toronto Police Service
- Vancouver Police Department

== Plans ==
The CISC has a strategic plan consisting of four pillars.

The first pillar is criminal intelligence personnel. According to this pillar, the CISC intends to improve national criminal intelligence by directing resources to the cultivation of intelligence expertise and equipment and to attract talent in this field to the CISC through its hiring policies.

Secondly, the CISC aims to provide support to its intelligence personnel through the direction given by the leadership of the organization, by making the necessary technological tools available to intelligence personnel based on the "need to know/right to know" principle, and by facilitating the analysis of intelligence data through training personnel in intelligence analysis methodology and best practices. The second pillar also includes disseminating processed intelligence back to member agencies and measuring the "value added" of criminal intelligence through assessing feedback and determining the satisfaction of members with the service through a performance-measuring tool called the "balance scorecard".

The third pillar is "criminal intelligence technologies", meaning the maintenance of the ACIIS system and data mining technology, and keeping up-to-date as new technologies develop.

The fourth and final pillar is the "criminal intelligence communications plan", which consists of coordinating information flows between member agencies as well as with members and non-member partners and instilling strategic-thinking on a national scale in criminal intelligence workers.

== See also ==
- List of law enforcement agencies in Canada
