= Boozefighters =

International motorcycle club

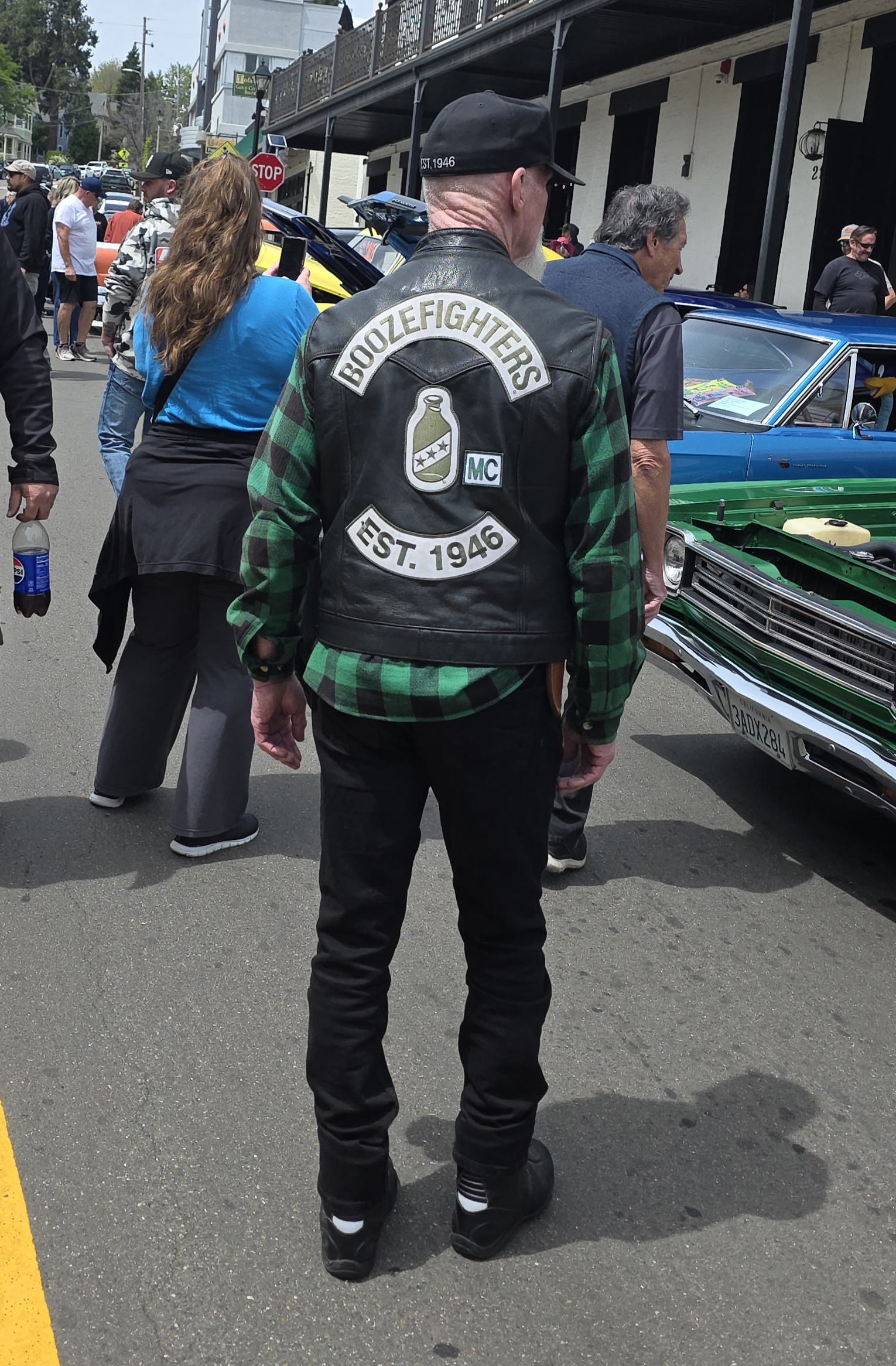
A member of the Boozefighters Motorcycle Club in 2026

The Boozefighters Motorcycle Club (BFMC) motorcycle club was founded in California after the end of World War II.

== Foundation: Wino Willie Forkner ==
Its founder was William Clyde "Wino Willie" Forkner Jr. had served in the military during World War Two and had a difficult time adjusting to civilian life after the war. He had been a member of the 13 Rebels Motorcycle Club for two years prior to the attack on Pearl Harbor. His nickname "Wino Willie" had come about at age 12 because he liked to drink red wine.

During the war, he had risen in the ranks of the Army Air Corps and then fallen again as the result of a drunken incident in a bar. After it ended, he re-joined the 13 Rebels. In 1946, he had his membership stripped from him by the other members after an incident at a quarter-mile race in San Diego where he got bored and drunk. He drove his own motorcycle through a wooden gate onto the racetrack, around the track, and eventually lost control.

Disillusioned, drunk, and angry, one evening he and three other former servicemen were drinking at the All-American Bar in Los Angeles. They decided to form a new motorcycle club themselves, taking the name from a shouted suggestion from a fellow bar patron named Walt Porter. They overheard their conversation to "Call it the Boozefighters." The four recruited another 16 members, all war veterans with one exception, Jim Morrison, a teenager, and applied for American Motorcyclist Association (AMA) membership, with C. B. Clauson, former paratrooper, as the club president. Forkner later reported that the AMA president declined the application stating that "No goddamn way am I giving a name like that to a charter."

The club began to grow, having three chapters (in Los Angeles, San Pedro, and San Francisco), by 1947. Members of all three attended the Hollister riot that year. The L.A. chapter got drunk before it even arrived at Hollister, starting out on the Thursday before the weekend by drinking in the All-American Bar, driving to Santa Barbara, drinking there, driving to San Luis Obispo where they were too drunk to drive on that day and decided to sleep in a bus terminal, driving on the next day to King City, buying more alcohol from a liquor store, and then driving on.

Wino Willie was mistakenly arrested at the riot, for purportedly inciting a riot and a jailbreak of other bikers who had already been arrested, when in fact he was trying to do the opposite and talk the mob out of staging a jailbreak.

When racing, Wino Willie wore the colors of another motorcycle club, the Yellow Jackets, rather than Boozefighters colors.

== Later years ==
The movie The Wild One, which Wino Willie initially consulted on but eventually resigned from over the way that bikers were being portrayed, boosted membership of the club during the 1950s. Club membership then shrank, as members retired or died during the 1960s, only for its numbers to swell again because of the Vietnam War as it was joined once again by ex-servicemen.

By the 21st century it had grown to become an international organization, with chapters in various European countries, Canada, The Philippines, South Korea and Japan. While considered an outlaw club by traditional old school MC standards, and though they helped jumpstart the outlaw MC movement, it is not a 1% by modern day definition as they do not have territory.

== Sources ==
- Barker, Thomas (2014). "Enter the One-Percenters". Biker Gangs and Transnational Organized Crime (2nd ed.). Routledge. ISBN 9781317524113.
- Hayes, Bill (2018). "Yellow Jackets". The One Percenter Encyclopedia: The World of Outlaw Motorcycle Clubs from Abyss Ghosts to Zombies Elite. Motorbooks. ISBN 9780760360538.
- Jeff. "A drinking club with a motorcycle problem". Difford's Guide.
