= List of gangs in Canada =

This article lists the notable gangs, security threat groups, criminal enterprises and related syndicates which participate in organized crime within various parts of Canada. Some of these organizations are based elsewhere (in other countries), but have members, chapters and/or operations set up in Canada.

== Multiracial groups ==
- The 1%ers Syndicate/Cartel, in Winnipeg (multicultural, Indo-Caribbean, Caucasian, Asian, black, native)
- Wolfpack Alliance
- EOA (East of Adelaide) – A conglomerate of street gangs and individuals involved in the narcotics trade based in the east end of London, Ontario. These neighborhood gangs are linked together by London Police Service into a single entity known as EOA due to the fact that they are mostly all connected to the same supplier. The city's largest organized crime group as a whole.
- First Division – London, Ontario based street gang
- K Town bloods(( multiracial including members such as rapper unloaded aka Bullet, Ten toes trey, mr .E known for dealing around kitchener))( web)https://ktown-chronicle-files.base44.app/
- Five Point Generalz
- H-Block – London, Ontario based street gang
- Kipps Lane Crew (KLC) – London, Ontario based street gang. Operates in the North-east of London.
- Ledbury-Banff Crips
- Mongrel Mob – 1 chapter in Montreal
- Ontario Wide Crew (OWC) – Provincial-wide organized group operating out of London, Ontario.
- Red Scorpions (Formerly a member of the Wolfpack Gang Alliance)
- Ugly crew– Peterborough, based street gang involved in money laundering, taxation of other groups in the area involved in the narcotics trade.
- NorthBlock Syndicate– Pickering, Ontario, a criminal organization involved in drug trafficking, credit card and bank fraud, truck hijacking, sale of stolen goods.
- United Nations gang – Primarily Caucasian, Asian, Indo-Canadian, and Persian (member of the Dhak-Dhure-UN Alliance)

== Aboriginal-based ==
- LA300 (Regina)
- Crazy Cree (extinct)
- Crazy Indian Nomads
- Crypts
- Death Do Us Part
- Deuce
- Hustle Crew
- Indian Posse – Canada's largest organized crime group as a whole.
- Kelowna Warriors
- Manitoba Warriors – Winnipeg based street gang.
- Mixed Blood
- Most Organized Brothers (a.k.a. MOB)
- Native Syndicate
- Native Syndicate Killers
- Ring piece mafia (Canada Wide)
- Redd Alert
- Ruthless Posse
- Self Made - (Regina)
- Saskatchewan Warriors – Saskatoon based street gang.
- Terror Squad
- Tribal Brotherz
- West End Boys
- West Side Soldiers
- West Side Outlawz (expanding fast)
- A$AP (relatively unknown)

== Black/African-Canadian ==
- Afrikan Mafia
- All Crips Gang

- Dixon Bloods (Somali Canadians)
- Driftwood Crips
- Eastside Disciples Crips
- Eastside Mafia Crips
- East Side Orton Park Bloods
- Falstaff Crips
- G-Siders
- Galloway Boys
- Gangster Disciples
- Ghetto Boys
- Ghetto Soldiers Crips
- Glendower Crips
- Jamestown (Doomstown) Crips
- Jungle City Goonz
- Jungle Posse
- Lakeshore Crips
- Mad Cowz
- Mother Nature's Mistakes
- Mount Olive Crips
- New Born Crips
- Nigerian mafia
- North Preston's Finest
- North Side Chalkfarm Bloods
- O-Blocc Crips
- Oriole Crescent Crips
- Overbrook Crips
- Pirus
- Project Originals
- Queens Drive Crips
- Rexdale Bloods
- Tandridge Crips
- Tongan Crip Gang
- Trethewey Gangster Crips
- Vaughan Road Bloods
  - M.O.B. Klick
- Vice Lords
- Uzi Crew Crips
- Westside Bloodz
- Young Buck Killas

== Caribbean ==
- Crackdown Posse – A Crip set in Montreal with members of mostly Haitian origin
- Downtown Posse – A Montreal Crip gang in Little Burgundy. Mostly of Jamaican origin.
- Jamaican posse – Has a significant base of operations in the city of Toronto
  - Shower Posse – Operates in the Canadian province of Ontario
- Uptown Posse – A Montreal Blood gang in Cote-des-Neiges. Mostly of Afroamerican and Jamaican origin.

== Eastern Asian, Triads and Tongs ==
- 14K (triad) (Chinese)
- Asian Assassinz (Chinese)
- Bahala Na Gang (Filipino)
- Bamboo Union
- Big Circle Gang (Chinese)
- F.O.B. Killers
- Fresh Off the Boat
- Luen Group
  - Leun Kung Lok
- Shui Fong (Chinese)
- Suey Sing Association (Chinese)
- Sun Yee On (Chinese)
- Tiny Rascal Gang (Cambodian)
- Wo Shing Wo (Chinese)
- Yakuza
- Yellow Triangle Boys

== European-Canadian and Caucasian ==
- 856 gang
- Aryan Nations – Canadian brand of a white supremacist group established in 1974, one of their Canadian leaders, Camey Nerland was sentenced to prison after he pled guilty for killing a native American, seen as a part of the Canadian Brotherhood.
- Aryan Guard – Radical white nationalist organization involved in hate crimes and pipe bombings, and is believed to be active again.
- Aggravated Resistance
- Albanian mafia
- Blood Family Mafia
- Bosnian mafia
- Greek mafia
- Irish Mob
- Jimmy Cournoyer Syndicate – Known as the King of Pot, responsible for creating a multibillion-dollar international narcotics trafficking empire.
- Légion Nationaliste – Radical white power skinhead group
- Marriott crime family – Nova Scotia based crime family, participant in the "Spryfield War"
- Melvin crime family – Nova Scotia based crime family, participant in the "Spryfield War"
- Northern Order – A Neo-Nazi terrorist organisation involved in organized crime
- Romanian mafia
- Russian mafia
- Serbian mafia
- Soldiers of Odin – An anti-immigrant group with 8 chapters in Canada
- Solntsevskaya Bratva
- Black Shirts Gang (BSG)– London, Ontario based Neo-Nazi group
- The Base – International Neo-Nazi white supremacist group
- The Loyal White Knights of the Ku Klux Klan – A branch of the KKK operating in Canada.
- West End Gang
- White Aryan Resistance (WAR) – began recruiting and created chapters in Canada with operation Maple leaf in 1993.
- White Boy Posse – Violent white supremacist gang

== Hispanic-Canadian ==
- 18th Street Gang (Mainly Mexicans, Salvadorans, Hondurans and Guatemalans)
- Batos Locos – Also known as Vatos Locos
- Florencia 13 (Mexican)
- Jalisco New Generation Cartel (Mexican)
- Latin Kings (Puerto Rican, Mexican, and other Latinos)
- Los Zetas (Mexican)
- MS-13 (Primarily Salvadoran, but also Honduran, Guatemalan and Mexican)
- Ñetas (Puerto Rican)
- Norteños (Mexican)
- Nuestra Familia (Mexican)
- Sinaloa Cartel (Mexican)
- Sur 13 (Mexican)

== Indo-Canadian ==
- Bishnoi gang
- Brothers Keepers (gang) – Gang active across Canada, Washington state and Minnesota (a part of the Wolfpack Gang Alliance)
- Dhak-Duhre Crime Groups Coalition
- Dhaliwal Crime Family –Old organized crime group active across Central and Eastern Canada & US with international criminal ties
- Independent Soldiers Gang – Decades old organized crime gang active across Canada (a part of the Wolfpack Gang Alliance)
- Kang Crime Group – Also known as "BIBO gang" or "Blood In, Blood Out gang" (formerly a member of the Wolfpack Alliance)
- Malli-Buttar Crime Groups Coalition
- Punjabi mafia
- The Ruffians gang - UN aligned gang which is made up solely of international students
- Sanghera crime family

== Italian-Canadian ==
- Bonanno crime family – one of the Five Families
- Coluccio crime family
- Commisso 'ndrina
- Cotroni crime family
- Cuntrera-Caruana Mafia clan
- DeMaria crime family
- Figliomeni crime family
- Luppino crime family
- Musitano crime family
- Papalia crime family
- Rizzuto crime family – also known as the Sixth Family.
- Ruso crime family
- Siderno Group
- Tavernese crime family
- Stefanini crime family

== Middle Eastern ==
- Kurdish Pride – London, Ontario

== East Asian ==
- 14K
- Bamboo Union
- Big Circle Boys

== South and Southeast Asian ==
- Pakistani mafia
- Tiny Rascal Gang (Cambodian)

== Outlaw motorcycle clubs ==
- Note: the five largest motorcycle clubs in Canada have chapters listed.
- Bacchus Motorcycle Club (5th)
  - Chapters/Charters (18 total in Canada)
- New Brunswick
  - Albert County (Mother Chapter)
  - York County
  - St. John
  - Charlotte County
- Newfoundland
  - Grand Falls Windsor
  - C.B.S (Conception Bay South)
- Nova Scotia
  - Halifax
  - Colchester
  - Hants County (Frozen)
  - Route 333 (Frozen)
- Ontario
  - Hamilton
  - Chatham
  - Sudbury
  - Halton Hill
  - Muskoka
  - Grey county
  - Haldimand county
  - Woodstock
- Prince Edward Island
  - Kings County
  - Prince County
- Bacchus MC support clubs
  - Mountain Men Rednecks MC
- Black Diamond Riders MC
- Black Hawks Motorcycle Club
- Condemned MC
- Freewheelers MC
- Gladiators MC
- Hells Angels (1st)
  - Chapters/Charters (44 total in Canada)
- Alberta
  - Edmonton
  - Calgary
  - Southland
  - Westridge
  - Hellside
  - Alberta Nomads (Red Deer)
- British Columbia
  - Vancouver
  - White Rock
  - Nanaimo
  - Haney
  - Mission City
  - Hardside
  - Kelowna
  - West Point
  - British Columbia Nomads
- New Brunswick
  - New Brunswick Nomads
- Nova Scotia (Prospective)
  - Musquodoboit Harbour (Frozen)
- Ontario
  - Keswick
  - Oshawa
  - London
  - Kitchener
  - Simcoe County
  - Toronto
  - Toronto North
  - Toronto East
  - Toronto West
  - Woodbridge
  - Niagara
  - Hamilton
  - Windsor
  - Brandford
  - Brooklin
  - Ontario Nomads (Ottawa)
  - Toronto South (former Para-dice Riders, merged with other Toronto chapters)
  - Toronto Downtown (former Last Chance MC, merged with other Toronto chapters)
- Prince Edward Island
  - Charlottetown
- Quebec
  - Montreal (First Chapter in Canada)
  - Montreal South
  - Sherbrooke
  - Quebec City
  - Trois Riviéres
  - Quebec Nomads
  - Laval (Aka. Montreal North, Frozen)
- Manitoba
  - Winnipeg
  - Manitoba Nomads
- Saskatchewan
  - Saskatoon
  - Regina
- Hells Angels support clubs
  - 103 Riders MC
  - Archrivals Motorcycle Club
  - Bad Disciples MC
  - Chain Breakers MC
  - Darksiders MC
  - Devils Army
  - Devils Ghosts
  - Dirty Few Motorcycle Club
  - Family Jammin' MC
  - Gate Keepers Motorcycle Club – 6 chapters in Canada
  - Highlanders MC – 3 chapters in Nova Scotia
  - Horseman Brotherhood
  - Iron Dragons MC
  - Katt Sass MC
  - Longhorns MC
  - Los Desperados MC
  - Minotaures MC
  - Malicious MC
  - Missiles Motorcycle Club
  - Plainsmen Motorcycle Club - Regina, SK
  - Niners MC
  - Red Devils Motorcycle Club – 8 chapters in Canada
  - Redline Motorcycle Club
  - Savage MC
  - Sedition MC
  - Shadow Club MC
  - Stolen Souls Motorcycle Club
  - Syndicate Motorcycle Club
  - Throttle Kings MC
  - Throttle Rockers MC
  - Tribal Motorcycle Club
  - Vikings Motorcycle Club
  - Unforgiven MC
- Iron Order Motorcycle Club – 6 chapters in Canada.
- Kinfolk MC - 5 Chapter in Canada
- Last Chance MC
- Loners Motorcycle Club (4th)
  - Chapters/Charters (16 total in Canada)
- World-wide/National
  - LMC International Nomads chapter
  - LMC Canada Nomads chapter
- Nova Scotia
  - LMC Fredericton chapter
- Ontario
  - LMC Woodbridge chapter (Mother chapter)
  - LMC Amherstburg chapter (Frozen)
  - LMC Richmond Hill chapter
  - LMC Stratford chapter
  - LMC Hamilton chapter
  - LMC Peterborough chapter
  - LMC Vaughan chapter (Frozen)
  - LMC Brockville chapter
  - LMC Toronto chapter
  - LMC Halton Hills chapter
  - LMC Cornwall chapter (Frozen)
  - LMC Windsor chapter (Frozen)
  - LMC London chapter (Frozen)
  - LMC Chatham chapter (Frozen)
  - LMC Lindsay chapter (Frozen)
- Alberta
  - LMC Edmonton chapter
  - LMC Edmonton North chapter (Frozen)
- Quebec
  - LMC Montreal chapter (Frozen)
- Saskatchewan
  - LMC Saskatoon chapter
  - LMC Swift Current chapter
  - LMC Regina chapter (Frozen)
- Loners support clubs
  - Annihilators Motorcycle Club(1997-1999)
  - Dirty Dozen MC
- Los Montoneros – Support/puppet club for the more well-known Bandidos Motorcycle Club
- Mongols Motorcycle Club – 1 chapter in Canada
- Moors Motorcycle Club – 2 chapters in Quebec
- Outlaws Motorcycle Club (2nd)
  - Chapters/Charters (24 total in Canada)
- Nation-Wide
  - Outlaws Nomads Canada
- Alberta
  - Edmonton
  - Calgary
- British Columbia
  - Kelowna
- New Brunswick
  - Fredericton
  - Woodstock
- Newfoundland
  - Bishop Falls
  - Grand Falls Windsor
- Nova Scotia
  - Cape Breton
- Ontario
  - Cornwall
  - Kingston
  - London
  - Ottawa
  - Ottawa South Side
  - Peterborough
  - Sault Ste. Marie
  - Sudbury
  - South Simcoe
  - St. Catherines
  - Trenton
  - Toronto
  - Hastings
  - Toronto East (Toronto South / East merge)
  - Toronto South (Toronto East / South merge)
  - Woodstock (Frozen)
  - Hamilton (Frozen)
- Quebec
  - Montreal (Frozen)
  - Montreal South (Frozen)
  - Danville (Frozen)
- Saskatchewan
  - Midlands
- Outlaws MC support clubs
  - Black Pistons Motorcycle Club – 2 chapters in Canada
  - Dead Eyes MC
  - Filthy 15 Motorcycle Club
- Para-dice Riders Motorcycle Club
- Queensmen Motorcycle Club – 3 chapters in Canada
- Rebels Motorcycle Club – 3 chapters in Canada
- Rock Machine (3rd)
  - Chapters/Charters (21 total in Canada)
- World-wide/Country-wide
  - RMMC International Nomads
  - RMMC Nomads Canada
  - RMMC Militia Nomads chapter
  - RMMC Infantry Nomads chapter
- Alberta
  - Edmonton
  - Calgary
  - Medicine Hat (Death Valley chapter)
  - Lethbridge
- British Columbia
  - Vancouver
- New Brunswick
  - Saint John
  - RMMC 506 chapter (506 Crew)
- Ontario
  - Windsor
  - Kawartha (Vengeance chapter)
  - Huron County (Redemption chapter)
- Quebec
  - Montreal (Original Mother chapter)
  - Sherbrooke (Current Mother chapter)
  - Quebec City
  - Trois-Rivières
  - Dead City chapter (Chapter 13)
- Manitoba
  - Winnipeg (Murder-Peg chapter)
- Saskatchewan
  - Regina (Psycho City chapter)
- Rock Machine MC support clubs
  - The Palmers MC
  - Fearless Bandits MC
  - Hell Hounds MC
  - New Blood MC
  - SS Elite Motorcycle Club
  - Vendettas Motorcycle Club – 6 chapters in Canada
- Salty Souls MC
- Satan's Choice Motorcycle Club (NEW 2017) – 2 chapters in Canada
- Satudarah Motorcycle Club – 1 chapter in Canada
- Sin City Deciples
- Sons of Satan MC – Support/puppet club for the more well-known Pagan's Motorcycle Club
- Vagabonds MC
- Vagos Motorcycle Club – 2 chapters in Canada
- Vagos MC support clubs
  - Loki Warriors MC
- Warlocks Motorcycle Club – 2 chapters in Canada

== Unknown ethnic makeup ==
- FU Crew – London, Ontario based street gang that started a war with the London charter of the Hells Angels in 2012, affiliates of the Outlaws Motorcycle Club.
- Hustle Crew
- Sic Thugz
- Soul Suvivaz
- Southside Kings
- Southside Queens
- Westside Outlaws
- White Oaks Crew – London, Ontario based street gang, operates on the Southwest side of the city

== Defunct organized crime groups ==
=== Black ===
- Eglinton West Crips – Alleged by authorities to have been dismantled in 2020 following Project Sunder, a year-long law enforcement probe.

=== Caribbean ===
- The Gatorz (Defunct)
  - Junior Gatorz (Defunct)

=== Outlaw Motorcycle Clubs ===
- 13th Tribe Motorcycle Club – Absorbed by the Hells Angels in 1984.
- Annihilators Motorcycle Club – An outlaw motorcycle group based in Richmond Hill, Ontario with members including Wayne Kellestine. Merged with the Loners Motorcycle Club in June 1999.
- Bandidos Motorcycle Club – The clubs single Canadian chapter merged with Rock Machine in the year 2001, they would operate in Canada until mid 2007.
- Devil's Disciples Motorcycle Club – Quebec based Club that was allied with Satan's Choice, dissolved after Canada's first biker conflict with the Popeyes Motorcycle Club the event is known as the Satan's Choice-Popeyes War.
- Death Riders MC – Former Hells Angels support club, was involved in the Quebec Biker War, now defunct.
- Demons Keepers Motorcycle Club – a now defunct support club of the Hells Angels, that had chapters in Toronto, Cornwall and Ottawa.
- Diablos Motorcycle Club – an outlaw motorcycle club run by Frank Lenti (Former member of the Loners MC) based in Ontario, dissolved and absorbed during Satan's Choice-Loners War with the Loners Motorcycle Club in 1995.
- Evil Ones MC – Former Hells Angels support club, was involved in the Quebec Biker War, now defunct.
- Foundation Motorcycle Club – A now defunct Ontario-based Hells Angels support club, that was active during the Ontario Biker War, it had chapters in Toronto, Hamilton and Oakville.
- Ghost Riders Motorcycle Club – Alberta based gang, absorbed by the Grim Reapers Motorcycle Club (Canada) in November 1980.
- Gitans MC – A Sherbrooke-based biker gang that patched over to the Hells Angels in 1984.
- Grim Reapers Motorcycle Club (Canada) – An outlaw motorcycle group that had grown to become a dominant club in Western Canada during the 1980s and 1990s. "Patched-over" to the Hells Angels in 1997. Unrelated to the active US-based club of the same name.
- Holocaust Motorcycle Club – Was the club belonging to the infamous Canadian criminal, Wayne "Weiner" Kellestine before it patched over to the Annihilators Motorcycle Club in the 1990s.
- Iron Hawgs Motorcycle Club – Toronto based Motorcycle Club that patched over to the Outlaws Motorcycle Club in 1984.
- Kinfolk MC (Canada) - Part of Kinfolk MC International, has 5 chapter throughout Canada
- Kings Crew Motorcycle Club – one of the dominant motorcycle clubs in Alberta during the 1980s and early 1990s, merged with the Hells Angels in late 1990's.
- Lobos Motorcycle Club – Merged with the Hells Angels in 2001
- Los Bravos – Patched over by the Hells Angels in 2000.
- Rockers Motor Club – Former Hells Angels support club created in 1992, it was involved in the Quebec Biker War, now defunct.
- No-Name Motorcycle Club – Also known as the "Not So Good-Looking Guys Club" was a Hamilton-based club, it was formed by African Canadian's when they were refused entry into the Outlaws MC, disbanded in late 70s when several members faced several charges
- Original Red Devils Motorcycle Club – Formed in Hamilton, Ontario in 1948 making it Canada's oldest Outlaw motorcycle club. Patched over by Bacchus MC in 2014. Unrelated to the Red Devils Motorcycle Club, which also has a presence in Canada.
- Popeyes Motorcycle Club – Notorious Québécois biker gang that eventually became absorbed by the Hells Angels in 1977 becoming its first chapter in Canada.
- Rebels Motorcycle Club (Canada) – Western Canada-based biker gang active from 1968 until 2004 with a majority of their chapters patching over to the Hell's Angels in 1998. Not to be confused with the Australian club of the same name.
- Rockers Motorcycle Club – Former Outlaws support club, based in Montreal, it eventually "Patched-over" to the Outlaws, giving them their second chapter in Montreal.
- Satan's Choice Motorcycle Club – Was once the dominant motorcycle club in Canada, operating out of its stronghold in the province of Ontario during the 1970s and was the second largest motorcycle club in the World behind the Hell's Angels during this period, with a membership of over 400. However, in 1977 their influence began to diminish with some of the club's chapters "patching over" to the Outlaws MC in 1977. The remaining chapters would eventually become members of the Hells Angels along with most of the other major outlaw clubs in Ontario, with the club disbanded in 2000
- The Spartans
- The SS Motorcycle Club – white-supremacist motorcycle gang, former members include Maurice Boucher, Salvatore Cazzetta, and Normand "Biff" Hamel (Hell's Angels).
- The Wild Ones – Gang disbanded around 1978 during the First Biker War.
- Warlords Motorcycle Club – "Patched-over" to Rebels Motorcycle Club (Canada) in 1983 after being defeated in Riverdale by the Rebels MC

=== Multiracial ===
- Dark Circle – Montreal Quebec based criminal organization, it was a participant in the Quebec Biker War.
- Pelletier Clan – Montreal Quebec based street gang, it was a participant in the Quebec Biker War.
- Westmount Crew – London, Ontario based street gang.
- Bono Boyz/Bono Hood – London, Ontario based street gang.

=== South Asian ===
- VVT

=== White ===
- Boyd Gang – Former infamous criminal organization based in Toronto.
- Dömötör-Kolompár criminal organization – Hungarian crime family that ran a human trafficking syndicate, lasting until 2010.
- Dubois Brothers – French-Canadian crime group in Montreal that was active up until the 1980s.
- Heritage Front – Canadian neo-Nazi white supremacist organization founded in 1989 and disbanded around 2005.
- Markham Gang – Historical criminal organization that was active in the middle of the 19th century.
- Shiner (Ottawa) – Historical gangs of Irish immigrants in Ottawa.
- The Stopwatch Gang – Trio of Canadian bank bandits who robbed banks in both Canada and the United States.
- Tri-City Skins – White power skinhead gang from Ontario that disbanded in 2002.

== See also ==
- Gangs in Canada
- Organizations designated as terrorist by Canada
