= Organized crime in London, Ontario =

The city of London, Ontario, Canada was established in 1826, and has since grown into Canada's 11th largest municipality. The city has had a long history of organized crime, with several high-profile incidents occurring there over the years. In 1901, London's first MP, John Carling, attributed the growth of London to three factors: the establishment of regional courts and administration in 1826, the arrival of the military garrison in 1838, and the arrival of the railway in 1853. From its position along the Quebec City–Windsor Corridor, the city has attracted investment in commerce, culture and manufacturing, and attracted criminal enterprises to exploit that growth.

London has seen the establishment of Canadian chapters of the Ku Klux Klan, planned bank robberies, and in modern times, the establishment of a variety of crime syndicates, street gangs, outlaw motorcycle clubs and nationalist groups.

== Overview ==
In the modern era, three major Motorcycle Organizations have chapters and operate businesses in London, Ontario. The Hells Angels, the largest outlaw motorcycle club in Canada, have an estimated 13 full-patch members and 100+ affiliates in the city. The Gate Keepers Motorcycle Club, a Hells Angels support club with chapters in Nova Scotia and Ontario, also have two chapters in London, the Middlesex County chapter and the Forest City chapter which was established in 2021. The Outlaws Motorcycle Club, the longtime rivals of the Hells Angels, had called the city home for years but was forced to shut down their London chapter in 2002. In recent years the Outlaws have been successful in reestablishing a presence in London, reopening the chapter in the early 2010s. A support club, the Filthy 15 MC was created in 2017, to support the Outlaws in London. While membership in the two main clubs, Hells Angels and the Outlaws, remains relatively stable, they oversee rapid growth in support clubs or puppet clubs. These support groups carry out crimes, provide protection and groom new recruits. Organized crime analyst James Dubro notes that members of support clubs are typically younger than their counterparts in the Hells Angels and the Outlaws clubs.

Along with other organizations, they supply a stream of illegal contraband and narcotics to multiple localized street gangs operating throughout the city. Often involved in the drug trade, gang members and affiliates are often suspects in break-ins, vehicle thefts, street rip robberies, stabbings and assaults. Gang members have been linked to several shootings over the past two decades. Despite a lack of news coverage in the 1990s and early 2000s, the street gangs began to gain notoriety in the 2010s with high-profile killings. A turf war broke out in 2012 between the London chapter of the Hells Angels MC and a local Street gang the "FU Crew", who were backed by the London chapter of the Outlaws Motorcycle Club. This resulted in the deaths of several individuals, and the arson of several biker and gang owned businesses and vehicles. When looking at the city's street gangs, Biker and organized crime analyst Yves Lavigne stated,

"These gangs are very dangerous. There are different levels of gangs. If the police are giving you the names of 'the seven', they must be the high rollers. These are the guys with guns and contacts with guys from outside London with access to the drugs," Lavigne said.

Most gangs in the city had managed to remain "under the radar" up until this point. Lavigne would add

No one had any idea about these gangs until this week, except for the people in the neighbourhoods they terrorize.

"The Seven" refers to the 7 largest street gangs monitored by the London Police. EOA (East of Adelaide) is a conglomerate of street gangs and individuals involved in the narcotics trade that are linked together by London Police Service into a single entity known as EOA. It is the city's largest organized crime group as a whole. The "Seven" also include the Kipps Lane Crew(KLC), White Oaks Crew (WOC), H-Block, The Black Shirts (BSG), First Division and Ontario Wide Crew (OWC). A lead investigator for the LPS had this to state:

London's 11 known street gangs aren't necessarily divided along geographic or ethnic lines. Most are multi-ethnic and multicultural. One might have roots in a neighbourhood but members tend to join from all over.

On October 7, 2011, London resident David Arbuckle was shot and killed on the corner of Wellington and Hill streets. It was not known if the victim had any gang associations, but the shooter was linked to the notorious EOA gang. The events in 2011 and conflict in 2012 resulted in the creation of the London Police Services "Gang unit". From the years of 2013 to mid-2015 they made over 400 arrests, laid 270 charges relating to narcotics, seized over 40 weapons and made 375 other criminal charges against members of the city's organized crime. The city has also had previous association with Hamilton-based Musitano crime family. There are also several Neo-Nazi and Nationalist groups in the city such as the Black Shirts Gang (The Black Shirts) and the Canadian Brotherhood(CB). The city's overall hate crime rate was higher (6.4 incidents per 100,000 population) than in Ontario (5.3) and Canada (4.9) in 2018. Between 2014 and 2018, the rate of police-reported hate crime in London increased by 78%, a notably larger increase compared with Ontario (+10%) and Canada (+33%). The city has also seen several notable incidents such as the first bank robbery in Canada to use a motor vehicle and an air plane respectfully, to escape the scene, the Ontario Biker War and the London Conflict.

== Early history ==
=== Bank robbers ===
The city of London, Ontario was home to the first ever bank robbery in Canada where an automobile was used by the robbers to escape from the scene of the crime in December 1920. Another milestone in Canadian history was reached 11 years later, in 1931, when London was home to the first ever bank robbery where a plane was used to evade authorities successfully. To this day, London police still do not know who is responsible for either robbery.

=== Motorcycle clubs ===
For much of its Post-War history, London, Ontario has been referred to as a "biker town". Several motorcycle clubs have operated in London and the surrounding area. While not criminal organizations on paper, they frequently have elements that commit crimes. The Queensman Motorcycle Club was founded in Windsor, Ontario in 1956. The Queensmen had established a chapter in London during the 1970s, and had multiple run-ins with law enforcement lasting until the late 1980s. On 1 July 1977, the Satan's Choice London chapter "patched over" to join the Outlaws. The journalist Jerry Langton described London as "very much an Outlaws town" in the 1980s and 1990s. The centre of the Outlaws in Ontario was Hamilton, as Mario Parente, the president of the Hamilton chapter, was considered to be the toughest Outlaw in Canada; the London chapter, however, was regarded as the second-most important Outlaw chapter in Ontario. London was a "very rich territory for drug sales", which the Outlaws had a monopoly on in London. London was also an important centre in the "meth alley" running along the 401 highway that connected methamphetamine manufacturing in the rural areas of southwestern Ontario to Toronto and to the Midwest.

The Annihilators Motorcycle Club operated in the nearby hamlet of Iona Station, and was frequently referred to as the London Annihilators, due to the fact the club did business and was actively involved in incidents in city during the 1980s and 1990s. In June 1999, the Annihilators would "patch-over" to the Loners Motorcycle Club, a Canadian-based motorcycle club with chapters located in the United States, Europe and Australia. The Loners frequently operated in London, as they owned several businesses in the city. When the London chapter of the Hells Angels was formed in 2001, most of its members came from the Loners during a split. On 12 April 2001, the Angels opened a chapter in London and promptly informed the Loners that they did not have the right to use Ontario on their patch, as the Loners were only a "regional" club.

Timothy Appleby of the Globe and Mail reported in 2004 on the Hells Angels' push into south-western Ontario, during what would come to be known as the Ontario Biker War: "From 1999 to 2002, when the conflict reached a peak, beatings, brawls and shootings became common". Appleby further wrote about the Hells Angels in London: "The Hells Angels nonetheless succeeded in becoming the dominant organized criminal presence in the area, as they have across Canada. Although their formal presence in London dates back only three years, the Hells Angels now have extensive interests in the city's strip clubs, tattoo parlours and half-dozen exotic massage joints (called "rub 'n' tugs" by the locals). They or their associates hold interests in at least two car dealerships. They're deeply involved, police say, in intimidation and extortion. And as in the rest of Ontario, they do a booming trade in cocaine, ecstasy, marijuana and prescription drugs...But for all their wealth, the Hells Angels' hold on the city's underworld is still founded on the threat of mayhem. In contrast to nearby communities such as Kitchener-Waterloo - where the Angels vigorously promote themselves as good citizens - intimidation, beatings and other violence, much of it drug-related, are common...Violent incidents - as many as four a month - go unreported because the victims are too terrified of the Angels to complain, sources say."

The other members of the Loners joined the Bandidos Motorcycle Club on 22 May 2001. The Bandidos also operated several businesses and were involved in several incidents in London, such as their participation during the incident at the 2002 London Motorcycle Show. They were also involved in the infamous Shedden Massacre that occurred in 2006, which resulted in the Bandidos Canada disbanding, and the rebirth of the Rock Machine. Most of the trial took place in London's courthouse.

== Major events ==
=== History of the London Klan ===
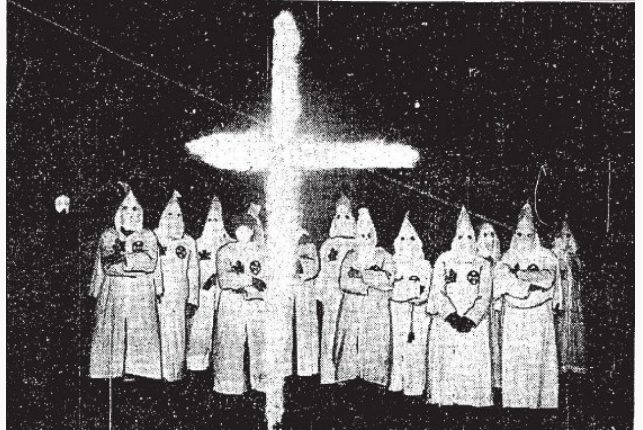
A Klan cross-burning ceremony in London, Ontario, in late 1925

The history of the Ku Klux Klan in London, Ontario began on May 18, 1872. When the former leader of the KKK in South Carolina, J. Rufus Bratton, arrived in London, Ontario under the alias of James Simpson. Bratton had fled America due to a lynching and other crimes that he had committed as a member of the klan in South Carolina, and was at the time on the US federal government's most wanted list for the murder of Jim Williams. He was assured by a fellow southerner, Gabriel Manigault, who had relocated to London, that he would be safe in the city, but that he needed to be watchful of American agents who sometimes entered Canada. Aside from the initial alias he arrived with, few other security precautions were taken.

South Carolina Governor Robert Kingston Scott sent Isaac Bell Cornwell to apprehend him. Cornwell applied to the United States Secret Service Department and received a warrant from President Ulysses Grant and was assisted by Joseph G. Hester of the department. Cornwell traveled across the Canadian border to London. On June 4, 1872, Bratton exited Doidge Park, located on Wellington Street, north of Grosvenor Street. The American agents had disguised themselves as taxi cab drivers. At approximately 4:30 p.m. Bratton approached Cornwell, who he believed to be a cab driver. The two men would begin to fight after a brief conversation. Cornwell was able to partially subdue Bratton while Hester arrived in another taxi to help place him in handcuffs. He was then subdued and forced into a taxi. The entire event was witnessed by an 8-year-old girl watching from across the road. According to authorities "the little girl's description of the altercation lead the police to believe that chloroform had been used to subdue Bratton". The incident was also partially viewed by two others, a Hotel manager named Edwin N. Moore, and Euphemia Dixon, a woman who lived nearby.

On the way to the train station, Bratton convinced Cornwell to read the warrant for his arrest. It was claimed that the warrant was not for Bratton, but for James William Avery. Bratton was brought from London to Yorkville where he was jailed. He was granted a bail of about $12,000 (modern equivalent of $279,064.92), which 13 local men raised. American newspapers and Canadian authorities called the apprehension a kidnapping, and the Canadian government called for Bratton's immediate release and return to Canada, as both the Canadian government and public were enraged at the violation of their national sovereignty. The Canadian Federal Government had brought the issue to the House of Commons on June 11, 1872. The House almost unanimously agreed. Sir John A. Macdonald, Canada's first Prime Minister, sent formal inquiries to the British Parliament in London, England. This resulted in Queen Victoria herself intervening. The Canadian government would also send a complaint to the Office of the British Ambassador in Washington DC, claiming that America had violated international law and had ignored the proper steps needed for extradition. The London Police Service had arrested Issac Cornwall on June 10, 1872, when he was again caught in London. He was placed in the cells at the London Police Station and the preliminary hearing was held on June 13. All who had witnessed the abduction of Bratton testified at the trial. With testimony from Bratton himself, who had been released two days before, the trial began. Cornwall was sentenced to three years in Kingston penitentiary for his role in the kidnapping.

Looking to avoid an international incident, Bratton was sent back to Ontario on June 11, where he was received warmly. Bratton continued his medical practice in London. Most Londoners seeking medical attention chose to overlook his associations with the KKK in favour of his experience as a Civil War surgeon, which brought skills that were highly sought after at the time. There was also a pamphlet released by a local man with shared sympathies, that gave Bratton a positive image and denounced accusations of his involvement with hate groups. He also began secretly making major contributions to the construction of the London chapter, though he would adamantly deny these claims. In 1882, the most notorious incident in the London area would occur when members of the London chapter of the KKK set fire to the Harrison residence on Wellington Road South. The Harrisons were an African-American family that had escaped slavery in Kentucky and Missouri, then fled to Canada in 1854 via the Underground Railroad. They had been dealing with discrimination in London, so they had decided to move to Windsor, Ontario. Two days later the house was burned to the ground. No one was injured in the blaze. The son of the Harrison's, Richard Harrison returned to London in 1934. Harrison had become an acclaimed African-American actor in the United States. Upon his return he made claims that the Ku Klux Klan had burned down his family home as a "going away celebration".

Bratton would return to South Carolina in the 1880s, but left behind an influential impact on the community that would see the rise of the Ku Klux Klan in London, Ontario during the 1890s and 1900s. By the 1920s, the rise of the "Second Klan" in the United States had further spurred on expansion and recruitment in Canada. This saw membership in London reach an all-time high. In 1922, J.H. Hawkins who was one of the original founders of the KKK in Canada, would visit a rally of thousands of members and initiates in London and stated that the Canadian Ku Klux Klan was not lawless, that it abided by the laws of the nation, but that it would promote changing those laws it didn't support or did "not meet the needs of the country". A 1925 photograph of garbed Canadian Klansmen published by the London Advertiser demonstrated that the Klan robes in Canada differed from those in the United States by including a maple leaf opposite the cross insignia.

In April 1925, the London chapter began preparations to form a London "Klan" exceeding 2,000 members. They began recruiting en masse, but this received little media coverage at the time due to the group's secrecy and recruiting tactics. New initiates were recruited at secret meetings that were not reported on. On August 2, 1925, a rally was held with more than 200 members, in which J.H. Hawkins and other high-ranking members of the group gave speeches explaining the group's beliefs and goals. They also recruited several new members. The mayor of London at the time, George Wenige took a firm stance against the emergence of this hate group and openly declared in a statement to the London Free Press on August 3, 1925, that the group was not welcome in London. George Wenige quote:

London needs no Ku Klux Klan or other order that seeks to gain unjust ends by a cowardly parade of masks and mystery. As Mayor of London, I will use all the power of my office to rid the city of the verminous missionaries of an order that seeks to terrify citizens who may differ from these so-called Knights of the Ku Klux Klan in race, colour, religion, or ability to succeed.

On January 21, 1926, the London Free Press reported that for the first time in Canadian history, large numbers of Klansman had attended the funeral of one of their prominent members, Alexander Milliken, who had worked as a watchman for the Canadian Pacific Railway in London. The Ku Klux Klan performed his last rights and buried him in ceremonial uniform. Several ceremonies were performed during the burial.

In 1926, the KKK were associated with the detonation of dynamite at the St. Mary's Roman Catholic Church in Barrie, Ontario. The man who placed the dynamite in the church's furnace room was later caught, and admitted that he did so on orders from the Ku Klux Klan. The Ontario media, politicians, other civic authorities, and religious leaders spoke out against such violence and against the Klan. By the winter of 1926, Klan membership in London and Ontario as a whole was declining. Though they would never regain the numbers in membership they possessed in the 1920s, the Knights of the Ku Klux Klan continued to operate in London and Ontario well into the 2000s, with some holdouts even continuing into the present.

=== Ontario Biker War ===
From the years of 1999 to 2002, the Ontario Biker War unfolded; the majority of conflict took place in London, Ontario. Tensions between three clubs, the Outlaws and Loners Motorcycle Club both had separate incidents with the Hells Angels, which all arose in 1998 when the Hells Angels attempted to gain a foothold in the province.

The conflict would reach a fever pitch in 2002 at the London Motorcycle Show, hosted at the Western Fairgrounds. The event had been sponsored by the Hells Angels for the past two years, and there were 110 members present, including members of their support clubs. An opposing group of 120 assembled at the fair grounds as well, made up of members from the Outlaws Motorcycle Club, who had traveled from all over Canada to support their London brethren, and long-term Hells Angels rival the Bandidos Motorcycle Club from St. Thomas. American members travelled up the 401 Highway from Detroit to support the Outlaws London chapter. Immediate intervention by the London Police Service avoided a major incident. Subsequent police crackdowns would lead to an end to the conflict.

=== London conflict ===
In early 2012, tensions arose between the Hells Angels and the FU Crew, a local street gang, and before long, the groups would clash in London, Ontario. After years of remaining out of the headlines for the most part, the FU Crew began to gain notoriety in the 2010s, when war broke out between them and the London chapter of the Hells Angels. The FU Crew was backed by the London chapter of the Outlaws Motorcycle Club; this was in many ways a continuation of hostilities between the two clubs. It resulted in the deaths of several individuals, and the arson of several biker and gang-owned businesses and vehicles, with some of the bikers fleeing town temporarily.

The dispute first flared up when a tattoo parlor associated with the Outlaws motorcycle club was set ablaze on the morning of January 7, 2012. During this period, the Hells Angels had begun to lean on the FU Crew to operate for them in London. When this was refused, a vehicle belonging to the leader of the street gang (who had connections with the Outlaws) was burned. Tensions continued with two separate fires at a massage parlour and a strip club, and then the shooting on January 11 of two people associated with the Hells Angels. On the same day, a massage parlor in St. Thomas, Ontario was burned down. Two more tattoo parlors were also threatened, and some Hells Angels pulled back to regain their footing. The conflict would eventually deescalate with a presumed peace being declared.

== Events by year ==
=== 1882 ===
In 1882. London members of the Ku Klux Klan were responsible for the burning of an African-American residence on Wellington Street belonging to the Harrison family. The Harrisons had fled slavery in the United States and were facing racism for settling in London, so much so that they had planned to move to Windsor two days before the fire was set.

Note: See more details in Major events section.

=== 1920 ===
On December 1, 1920, there was a robbery at the Merchants Bank, which is now known as the South London Branch of the Bank of Montreal, located on Wortley Road. Two masked gunman entered the bank and began demanding money. J. Lackie, who was working as an assistant accountant for the bank, was injured when he was stuck in the head by one of the robbers with the butt of his pistol. E.M. Dagg, who was acting manager during the time of the robbery, was told to get face down on the ground. The robbers were given around $800 (over $11,000 adjusting for inflation) from the tills, this seemed to satisfy them as they did not ask for the safe containing $40,000 (modern equivalent of over $560,000) in cash and assets to be opened. They exited the bank and for the first time in Canadian history, they entered an automobile that they would use to escape the scene of the crime. They had previously stolen the automobile from a man named Roy Dale. The robbers used the vehicle to escape the crime scene and ditched it on the grounds of the London Asylum located on what is now Highbury Street. No one was ever charged in connection with the robbery as police were not able to gather sufficient evidence or leads on finding the "Wheeled Bandits".

The financial institution would shut its doors on July 31, 1931, partially due to the wartime conditions of the Great Depression, also due to the fact that it was involved in one of the most notorious robberies in the city's history.

=== 1931 ===
On June 27, 1931, London became the site of the first bank robbery in Canadian history to accomplish a getaway with an airplane. The robbery took place on a Saturday afternoon. The target was Toronto Bank's London branch, and required a lot of planning. The robber had contacted the small, local airport in Lambeth, Ontario, to arrange a plane to fly him to Hamilton to "view the horse races." He then took a taxi to an area near the bank, located on the corner of Richmond and John Streets. The bank was about to close for the day, but he was able to gain access when he claimed to be an official from the Canadian Bankers Association (CBA). Once inside the bank, he drew his firearm and forced two clerks and the bank's acting manager into the safe. He packed $2,604 (modern equivalent of over $48,000) in a bag, and locked the employees in the bank's vault; but he did admit a customer to use the bank that was now closed.

After exiting the bank, he made his way down Richmond Street. Cab driver Clifford Bice had been contacted a half an hour earlier by a gentleman who wished to tour the Dunlop Tire Company, located in nearby Lambeth (now part of London). The robber entered the cab and was dropped off close to the airport. After Bice returned to London, he located several coins discarded in the back of his car. He notified the authorities, giving them the first clue that something had happened. By this time, the robber had already boarded the plane and taken off. The pilot he had hired, Al Brown, was a local flying instructor who wanted to make some extra money. Neither Bice nor Brown were accomplices in the robbery, and had no knowledge of their passenger's plans. The robber notified the pilot that he might have made a mistake, and that it might be too busy to land in Hamilton, so the pilot changed course to the Weston Airport near Toronto.

W.C. van Horn was in charge of the operations at the airport, and was attempting to hail a taxi for the robber, who had suddenly disappeared. A Toronto taxi driver claimed to have picked up a mysterious man and given him a ride to Davenport Road. A later report was heard from the owner of a cigar shop, who claimed that a man entered the store, and bragged about robbing a bank in London and escaping via plane, leading to the newspapers referring to him as the "Winged Bandit". Police were unable to find any evidence as to who was behind the robbery, and to this day it remains unsolved.

The financial institution shut its doors for good on July 31, 1931. Along with what was formerly known as the Merchants Bank, which was robbed in 1920, the banks were closed partially due to the wartime conditions of the Great Depression, and also due to the fact that the banks were involved in two of the most notorious robberies in the city's history.

=== 1940 ===
On January 29, 1940, the East London branch of the Dominion Bank on the corner of Dundas and Rectory Street was robbed. On April 11, 1940, a robbery occurred at Anderson's supermarket located at 511 Elizabeth Street. A man entered the store and asked for a carton of cigarettes. After the owner retrieved them, the individual pulled a pistol on her, and demanded the store's money. She screamed as a result, which caused the man to slightly recoil. Seeing an opening, the owner, Mrs. Jane Anderson, and her 12-year-old daughter began to barrage the would-be robber with a tirade of produce from the store, including soda bottles, straw containers, and boxes of cookies. The robber clearly did not want to cause harm to the victims as he quickly fled the scene instead of retaliating. Mrs. Anderson chased him on foot for a little bit until he fled in his vehicle. The Anderson family had immigrated to Canada around the beginning of the Second World War. They had just recently opened the market and were not used to this type of behavior in their native Britain.

According to London authorities this robbery matched a series of robberies carried out by a group in the previous months. The cigarettes that were requested by the robber were the same brand of cigarettes that were stolen by two gunmen that had held up other stores and businesses in London's East end, including the March 4th robbery of Mrs. Reemer's store, located on the corner of York and Rectory. A store belonging to the Ross family, located at 623 Hamilton Road, was also robbed on March 15, 1940.

=== 1977 ===
In 1977, the Outlaws Motorcycle Club began to expand into Canada. They established their first chapters by patching over several chapters of the Satan's Choice, one of which was the young London chapter.

=== 1978 ===
At Wayne Kellestine's 1982 trial for assault, one of the witnesses testified that it was widely known in criminal circles that Kellestine, then President of the Holocaust Motorcycle Club, had murdered 37 year old Giovanni DiFilippo in 1978. DiFilippo was a London, Ontario businessman with assumed associations to organized crime. He was killed while answering his front door. An assassin disguised as a pizza delivery man shot him in the head with a pistol three times. His father-in-law Vito Fortunate was also shot and injured, but survived the incident. A police investigation established that Kellestine had almost certainly been the one who murdered DiFilippo, but there was insufficient evidence to bring charges against him.

=== 1979 ===
In 1979, there was internal strife in Spain due to a referendum in 1978. A separatist movement had begun in 1959 that began resisting the Spanish Government. This event would come to be known as the Basque conflict. The new Spanish constitution of 1978 had overwhelming support in Spain, with 88.5% voting in favour, among a voter turnout of 67.1%. In the three provinces of Basque country, the figures were lower, with 70.2% voting in favour, from a turnout of 44.7%. This was due to the call to abstention by EAJ-PNV and the creation of a coalition of Abertzale left organisations, brought together to advocate for "no" in the referendum, as they felt that the constitution did not meet their demands for independence.

When these demands were not met, they began using violence to change the results. This led to a massive strike sparked by the murder of a member of the Socialist Workers Party. The separatists began to attack political leaders, resulting in the death of German Gonzalez Lopez, who was shot dead on October 27, 1979. Two days later, a man in London, Ontario who went by the alias "Stephan" claimed to represent the Spanish separatists. He delivered a threat to Ignacio Aguirre, who was the Spanish Secretary of State for tourism at the time. He was able to contact Aguirre while he was in Canada for a day long visit. Stephan revealed that the group would begin bombing tourist resorts on the Spanish Mediterranean coast by February 1980, if members were not released from prison. He also stated that the group's target was property of the hotel chains themselves, not necessarily the occupants.

On October 30, 1979, two members of the Queensman Motorcycle Club, Don Walsh and Rebel Russel, were detained by London Police at a TD Canada Trust Bank located in the Westown plaza (now known as Cherryhill Mall). A pedestrian had reported seeing two individuals carrying firearms, and believed a bank robbery was in progress. The bikers did not have firearms on them, and were there just to make deposits at the bank. The chains holding wallets in their pockets were mistaken for pistols. As the London police approached the bank, they tried to do so in a covert manner, but they were noticed by the bikers, who were wondering what was happening outside. The officers then entered the bank and asked them to put their hands above their heads. A search showed that they were not armed. The two Queensmen were released by police. Walsh made the comment: "This is different" in reference to the fact that once police had made their arrests, they did not usually release bikers easily.

=== 1980 ===
On June 24, 1980, five members of the London chapter of the Queensman Motorcycle Club, along with a 15-year-old female juvenile faced charges of rape, after two sisters claimed that they had been gang raped at the group's clubhouse. One of the five members was initially convicted of rape and jailed. He was released on a $75,000 bail. The four other members and the juvenile were charged following the subsequent investigation of the group's headquarters. Due to the age of the people involved, including the accused, much of the evidence was banned from being publicly released. But the members received minor prison sentences and fines as a result of the events. Had this occurred in the modern day, the charges would have been much more stringent.

On July 2, 1980, the clubhouse for the London chapter of the Queensman Motorcycle Club, located at 626 Wonderland Road, was deemed unfit for human habitation by the London-Middlesex Health Unit. The club was given notice that anyone occupying the residence after the given date could receive a fine of $2,000 and up to six months in prison. There were accusations that this was an attempt by police to remove the Queensman from the area. This was dismissed by Inspector Don Andrews. Who stated:

We didn't do it because it was a motorcycle club, we did it because it was unfit for human habitation.

London Police also stated that the club had known about it beforehand, and had removed most items of value, leaving the property with only "junk", "lots of litter, bottles and cans". The two story building marked "No Trespassing" was scattered with images of scantily clad women, liquor bottles and a sign on the bathroom door that said "please don't flush sanitary napkins or dead babies", depicting the group's dark sense of humor. The fenced-in property, complete with dogs (which had been moved by the club already) and iron bars on the windows, was used as a compound by the club. This event caused the club to relocate to a new location in London.

During this period the London chapter of the Queensmen had over twenty "full-patch" members and the police feared tensions with the club and its chapters from the surrounding area. The Queensman Motorcycle Club's mother chapter was located in Windsor, Ontario, but by the 1980s, they had established chapters in London, Chatham and Amherstburg as well.

On July 4, 1980, a group of over 300 bikers gathered for a pig roast barbecue on a six-acre property in Putnam, Ontario, just outside of London. The local authorities monitored the meeting, saying it was a precaution when gatherings of this size involving bikers occur. The bikers claimed that they were just there for a good time and not looking to cause an incident. About 30 or so police officers began handing out tickets to bikers, which the bikers perceived as harassment. Several individuals were ticketed or charged for acts such as traveling with open liquor, possession of marijuana, and license issues. Five others were charged with possessing concealed weapons. A motorcyclist from London was charged for illegal possession of a firearm and wearing headgear that was not government approved for riding.

On July 7, 1980, an act of arson by an unknown party in an attempt to short-circuit the city's bulldozers caused an estimated $3,000 (modern equivalent of over $10,000) in damages to the former Queensmen clubhouse. London firefighters spent a little less than an hour putting out the ensuing inferno. The building was demolished not long after.

=== 1985 ===
In 1985, Brian "Bo" Beaucage, a member of the Satan's Choice Kitchener chapter, visited London, Ontario. Beaucage was known for his violent hatred of the Outlaws. He had travelled to London to pull the sign off of the Outlaws' London clubhouse (which used to formally be a Satan's Choice chapter before "Patching-over" in 1977), causing the Outlaws to shoot him. He was wearing a bulletproof vest and survived.

=== 1987 ===
On 16 January 1987. Beaucage of the Satan's Choice was critically injured during another visit to London. He was shot during an incident by a member of the Outlaws London chapter with a .45 calibre handgun. He took a bullet to the heart, but again survived a shooting.

=== 1989 ===
In February 1989, during the annual London Motorcycle Show, which was hosted at the Western Fairgrounds, the president of the Annihilators Motorcycle Club St. Thomas chapter, Wayne Kellestine became inebriated at the event. Kellestine physically assaulted a police officer and then attempted to flee by hijacking a limousine, leading to a car chase that ended with him crashing the car into the Outlaws clubhouse located on Egerton Street. The incident confirmed Kellestine's reputation as a "heat score" (underworld slang for a criminal who attracts police attention with his antics), which was why he was never invited to join the Outlaws, and why his club would cease to be a support club for the Outlaws in the late 1990s.

=== 1992 ===
On March 12, 1992. As a part of a crackdown on the Outlaws and their support club the Annihilators, London Police, along with members of the Canadian Armed Forces from the Wolseley Barracks(called in for the use of their metal detectors) launched a series of raids dubbed Operation Bandito. Police targeted the Outlaws MC chapter in London, their support club the Annihilators MC which was located in nearby St. Thomas at the time was also raided. Authorities eventually charged 15 members and 3 associates, this included two members of the Outlaws London chapter and several members of the associated St. Thomas-based Annihilators with a total of 66 narcotics and weapons charges. Police had also seized significant amounts of cocaine, marijuana, several restricted firearms and over $52,000(over $110,000 at current rates of inflation) in cash.

Authorities had been aided by Micheal Simmons, he was related to the President of the Outlaws London chapter and had sought out London Police Service to deliver an offer of becoming an informant. The London Police Service was extremely surprised by this but immediately accepted his offer and gave him a list of 12 individuals that they wanted him to gather information on. Simmons began preparing himself to prospect for the Outlaws, he used his influential position as the president's brother to gain trust with the club's members, as they showed him a great amount of respect due to his blood connection.

From 1991 to 1992, he gathered evidence on his brother and other members of club, all while working with an undercover officer. By early 1992 the authorities believe they had the necessary evidence to move against the Outlaws. The raids on March 12, led to the arrests of 18 individuals including Simmons brother who was forced to pay a fine of $25,000 and was sentenced to 10 years in prison. However Simmons identity was not properly protected as the undercover officer was present during the apprehension of the accused, his identity had also been openly revealed by the judge during the case. He would eventually fall out of favour and be removed from the witness protection program in 1994.

=== 1998 ===
On 7 April 1998, Jeffrey LaBrash and Jody Hart, two members of the Outlaws biker gang, were gunned down leaving the Beef Baron strip club on York Street by two men associated with the Hell's Angels. LaBrash was the acting president of the London chapter of the Outlaws and his shooters were brothers Paul and Duane Lewis. A London millionaire businessman, Salvatore Vecchio, paid $30,000 of the $50,000 bail the court had imposed on the Lewis brothers charged with killing LaBrash and Hart. Vecchio lived in a luxury condominium and was one of the few people in London who owned a Ferrari. Besides real estate, Vecchio's fortune rested on loan sharking and a hardcore pornographic web site with ties to both outlaw bikers and the Mafia. Vecchio was an associate of the Musitano Family, and a friend of "Fat Pat" Musitano. Vecchio had known the Lewis brothers, and may have employed them as enforcers with his loan shark business. After the murders of LaBrash and Hart, the Outlaws placed a $50,000 bounty on each of the Lewis brothers. Also in April 1998, on the same day as the funerals for the two Outlaws, T. J. Baxter's Tap & Grill, a popular restaurant in London, was bombed, injuring five and causing an estimated $1,000,000 in damages.

On 15 December 1998, Vecchio, who was widely believed to be linked with the Hells Angels, was murdered and his body found buried in a swamp outside London. Because Vecchio's body was found close to Wayne Kellestine's farm, and similarity with the murder of David "Sparky" O'Neil in 1992, the police believe that Kellestine was involved in Vecchio's murder, and may have been the gunman who killed him. Kellestine was the president of the Annihilators MC St. Thomas chapter, a puppet club for the Outlaws. The attention brought about by these events would result in the Annihilators ceasing to operate as a puppet club for the Outlaws, which increased tensions between their former allies, they became a probationary chapter for the Loners Motorcycle Club and later a full chapter in 1999.

The Lewis brothers were acquitted in 1999 of killing LaBrash and Hart on the grounds of self-defense, claiming that LaBrash had pointed at a gun at them in the Beef Baron parking lot. That gun was not found at the crime scene. The defense claimed that the DJ at the Beef Baron, an Outlaw supporter, had removed the gun from LeBrash's corpse as part of a plot to frame the Lewis brothers. As the DJ had fled back to his native Britain after the killings, he was not available to contradict the defense's theory, which created sufficient doubt in the jury's minds to ensure the acquittal of the Lewis brothers. The significance of the killing of LaBrash and Hart was that for first time, people associated with the Hells Angels had killed within Ontario, showing the Angels were deadly serious about their plans to expand from Quebec into Ontario.

=== 1999 ===
- Ontario Biker War

In 1999, the Ontario Biker War would begin due to the Hells Angels attempts at establishing a foothold in the province by trying to "Patch-over" the Loners Motorcycle Club which had been a major club in the Ontario for decades. On 2 June 1999, the Annihilators Motorcycle Club was "Patched-over" by the Loners. One of the members of the London/Chatham chapter of the Loners, Jimmy Coates, had a brother, John Coates, who was a member of the Hells Angels Sherbrooke chapter. John Coates was 6'7" tall, weighing 300 pounds, while younger brother Jimmy was not as large, but still intimidating. Through his brother, Jimmy Coates opened a secret pipeline for buying drugs from Sherbrooke.

The President of the London/St. Thomas chapter, Wayne Kellestine, was adamantly against having the Loners join the Hells Angels, and when certain members of his chapter, did not agree with him started meeting behind the club's back with the Hells Angels Sherbrooke chapter, Kellestine stripped them of their colours. One Loner was also stuck with a pistol and robbed for making further comments. Together, the Coates brothers worked to encourage a mutiny against Kellestine with the promise of joining the Angels as the reward. On 22 October 1999, an assassination attempt was made against Kellestine as he stopped in his truck for a red light in his hometown of Iona Station. A car drove up alongside, driven by Philippe "Philbilly" Gastonguay of the Angels' Sherbrooke chapter, and a pro-Angel Loner, David "Dirty" McLeish. One of the two men opened fire, spraying Kellestine's truck with bullets. Both men would be arrested and Kellestine would survive unharmed. The two shooters and both Coates brothers were charged with "conspiracy to commit murder". They would plead guilty to "conspiracy to commit bodily harm", and were jailed. When the brothers got out, they would be running the club's Hells Angels London chapter.

The Hells Angels were intent on gaining influence in Southern Ontario especially. In other areas of Ontario, clubs had been quite welcoming of the Angels; but here they faced stiff resistance, their main opposition being their old time rival the Outlaws Motorcycle Club (at the time, the largest motorcycle club in the province). As the club's Quebec chapters planned their expansion Eastwards in late 1999, London was solidly in Outlaws control and had been since the late 1977, but in establishing a chapter here, it would create a vital link between Windsor and Kitchener. The Outlaws London chapter clubhouse was located on Egerton Street East, near the grounds of the Western Fair, was considered a local landmark by the people of the city. Their President, Mario Parente, was an individual who could not be intimidated. By the end of 1999, the Hells Angels Ontario Nomad chapter and the Outlaws began to engage each other in both London and Hamilton, with several brawls and incidents occurring between the clubs. In December, the Montreal-based Jackels Motorcycle Club established a chapter in London to operate as a support club in the city. A Biker Enforcement Unit representative stated:

They used to drive by and taunt each other, For the H.A., their priority is to absorb other gangs and gain territorial control. In order to do that, they either have to befriend or fight their rivals.

=== 2000 ===
- Ontario Biker War

At the same time that the Ontario Biker War was underway, another conflict was occurring in neighboring province of Quebec. The Quebec Biker War began in 1994 and saw the Hells Angels face the Canadian-based Rock Machine for control of the narcotics trade in the province. By 2000, the war had intensified. The Rock Machine began expanding into Ontario with three chapters (Toronto, Kingston and Niagara Falls). Not wanting to fall behind the Hells Angels, it established its first Ontario chapter in Toronto in late 2000. This infuriated the Outlaws, and the Hells Angels sought to gain the upper hand, so they gave a limited time offer to Outlaw motorcycle clubs in Ontario (especially Satan's Choice and Para-dice Riders). There would be no probationary period for Hells Angels club membership, and all members would receive Full-Patch. This resulted in 168 members of the Para-dice Riders, Satan's Choice, Lobos and Last Chance "patching" to the Angels. Overnight, the Hells Angels went from one chapter in Ontario to 13, giving them a massive increase in both manpower and area of operation. Throughout 2000, brawls were common between the two groups across the province, several which occurred in London, with a particularly notable one occurring at the local annual motorcycle show, with multiple injuries on both sides. Shawn "Cheeks" Boshaw, a member of the London Outlaw chapter went over to the Hells Angels together with David "The Hammer" MacDonald of the Outlaws' Hamilton chapter.

- Other events

In late 2000, the street gang Kipps Lane Crew was established in the neighborhood of Kipps Lane and the surrounding area in Northeast London. It would keep itself far away from the ongoing conflict between motorcycle clubs.

=== 2001 ===
- Ontario Biker War

In early 2001, the Hells Angels established a prospective chapter in London, Ontario. They began investing in businesses within the city, this would include strip clubs, tattoo shops and a half-dozen exotic-massage parlors, referred to as "rub 'n' tugs" by many in London. They were also involved in the automotive trade and owned two automotive repair shops, but most specifically in the city's narcotics market. In addition to their own businesses, the Hells Angels allegedly supplied a group of up to 30 street gang members to cook cocaine powder into crack, and peddle it on London street corners, sources claim. A Hells Angels clubhouse was opened at 732 York Street, just up the road from the Outlaws main clubhouse, which had around to eight to ten "full-patch" members. The location seemed to be a deliberate provocation. On 12 April 2001, the Hells Angels promptly informed the Loners that they did not have the right to use "Ontario" on their patch, as the Loners were only a "regional" club. Unable to stand on their own, the Chatham/London Loners joined the Bandidos on 22 May 2001, as probationary members becoming full members on 1 December 2001. The Angels also began aggressively attempting to recruit Outlaws to the London chapter. The London chapter of the Outlaws countered this by putting restrictions and intense pressure on members not to defect, sometimes with the threat of violence. Some Outlaws did switch sides and suffered violent retaliation. More exchanges occurred during this period after three Outlaws in London defected to Hell's Angels. Exchanges saw at least 15 people injured in 2001.

During this period, both Coates brothers and their friends were released from prison. John Coates would become President of the London probationary chapter, and Jimmy would begin prospecting. In June 2001, the Outlaws' Woodstock clubhouse was burnt to the ground in an act of arson. The Hells Angels were suspected to be involved. In August 2001, a member of the Outlaws was pulled over by police en route to the York Street clubhouse of the Hells Angels, and authorities confiscated body armor, various firearms, and a pipe bomb.

In July 2001, three members of the Hells Angels were charged with extortion when they attempted to get a $70,000 payment from a business owner. The three men pled guilty to lesser charges. In December 2001, the Hells Angels patched over a dozen more Outlaws in Ontario. Other Outlaws were faced with an ultimatum: switch sides or retire.

=== 2002 ===
On the night of 7 January 2002, members of the Jackals, a Hells Angels puppet club, showed up outside of the house of Thomas Hughes, the president of the Outlaws' London chapter, on Egerton Street located near the Outlaws clubhouse. The Jackals demanded that Marcus Cornelisse, an Outlaw, come out of Hughes's house to talk to them. Instead, Hughes and Cornelisse came out and opened fire, leading to a shoot-out that saw one Jackal, Eric Davignon, shot in the stomach. Though a number of shots were exchanged by both groups, Davingon was the only person hit, which he would survive. The shoot-out ended with the Jackals fleeing in their car as Hughes and Cornelisse ran after them, shooting wildly into the dark.

Hughes was charged with four counts of attempted murder. He also incurred 23 additional charges relating to firearms, ammunition, this included semi-auto rifles and explosives in his residence. Eventually the attempted-murder charges were dropped as self defense, he was sentenced to only 30 months incarceration.

By now, London City council and London Police Service were under intense pressure by the public to do something about the situation. Then in late January 2002, tensions in the conflict reached their height. Outlaws from locations all over Canada began to travel to London to assist the London chapter, along with some American Bandidos and other rivals of the Angels. The 2002 London Motorcycle Show, organized at London's the Western Fair District, was promoted by the Hells Angels, who had run London's annual motorcycle-trade show for the last two years in a row. It was one of the "top five events of its kind in Canada." This venue would be the target of retaliation by the Outlaws and Bandidos.

=== The 2002 London Motorcycle Show ===
In February, 2002, the expo was on a Saturday and was open to the public. Around mid-afternoon, 120 Outlaws and Bandidos arrived at the Western Fair district in London. On the other side were 110 Hells Angels and their support club, the Jackals. Some of the Outlaws arriving wore body armour. Some brandished large knives on their belts. The Bandidos, who had traveled up the Highway 401 from the US city of Detroit, arrived in a large group. They made a public display of respect for the Outlaws, then positioned themselves with their allies. The Bandidos and the Outlaws found themselves surrounded on three sides by Hells Angels. Surprised spectators fled to safe distances. Before hostilities could begin, a team of over 40 police officers donning full riot gear from the London Police Service intervened and physically separated the two groups, demanding that the Bandidos, especially members of international status to depart. Police Chief Murray Faulkner said:

If the police weren't there, we were in for trouble. Big-time. I was guessing a multiple shooting or stabbing.

Either way, the Western Fair committee barred the Hells Angels who organized the event from future use of the venue. London's then-mayor Anne Marie De Cicco was successful in her attempts to ban the London Motorcycle Show from the city as long as was directed by the Hells Angels. De Cicco banned Pooler's group, 2-4 the Show Productions, from the London Fairgrounds permanently.

=== 2005 ===
On 2 June 2005, Shawn "Cheeks" Boshaw of the Hells Angels' London chapter was arrested in Peterbourgh on charges of narcotics trafficking.

=== 2007 ===
On 15 April 2007, Marcus Cornelisse was questioned by the police about the violation of his bail conditions, leading him to attack and beat two police officers in London strip club.

=== 2009 ===
On February 14, 2009, one of the founders of the Kipps Lane Crew(KLC), Matthew Owen, was stabbed and killed during brawl at an East London residence. Another member and two others were injured. It is not known what started the incident, but a fight erupted and spread into the backyard of the residence, as someone smashed through the patio door. Authorities say several people were involved in the altercation.

=== 2011 ===
On August 25, 2011, a member of the Kipps Lane Crew saw members of an opposing group inside Jack's Bar on Richmond Street. He had been asked to leave the establishment earlier in the day. He fired multiple shots from a 9mm handgun into the business. No one was killed, but an innocent bystander, Ashley Hay, was injured. She spent over a week in the hospital recovering after having a bullet removed from her lung and clavicle. The KLC member was sentenced to 12 years in prison for the incident. In October 2011, a member of the Kipps Lane Crew, Denzel Borden, was sentenced to five years in prison for "possession of a loaded and prohibited firearm", and for the killing of Thi Tran, who was shot outside K's Sports Lounge & Grill. In the fall of 2014, a jury ruled that Borden had acted in self-defense as Tran had been approaching him with a tire iron.

=== 2012 ===
- London Conflict

In early 2012. A conflict erupted between the two groups in London, Ontario. After years of remaining out of the headlines for the most part, the city's street gangs began to gain notoriety in the 2010s when a war broke out between the London chapter of the Hells Angels MC and the FU Crew, a local street gang backed by the London chapter of the Outlaws Motorcycle Club. This resulted in the deaths of several individuals, and the arson of several biker and gang-owned businesses and vehicles, with some of the bikers fleeing town temporarily.

The dispute first flared up when a tattoo parlor associated with the Outlaws motorcycle club was set ablaze on the morning of January 7. During this period, the Hells Angels had begun to lean on the FU Crew to operate for them in London. When this was refused, a vehicle belonging to the leader of the street gang was burned. Hostilities continued with two separate arsons at a massage parlour and a strip club, and then the shooting on January 11 of two people associated with the Hells Angels. On the same day, a massage parlor in St. Thomas, Ontario was burned down. Two more tattoo parlors were also threatened, and some Hells Angels pulled back to regain their footing. The conflict would eventually deescalate with a presumed peace being declared.

- Other events

On August 31, 2012. A member of the Kipps Lane Crew, shot a man believed to be associated with EOA, near Queens and Adelaide Street around 2:30 p.m. The man survived the attack but these events led to a 5-hour standoff on a Kipps Lane property, London Police brought in their tactical response unit(SWAT equivalent), a Police modified APC(armoured personnel carrier) and created a perimeter around the residence. The result was the arrest of four members or affiliates and the confiscation of a "shotgun and almost 1,900 rounds of various types of ammunition, a taser, pepper spray, stolen IDs and a small amount of methamphetamine". Over 16 charges were handed out to the four members of the gang, including 12 firearm related charges.

=== 2014 ===
On February 21, 2014, London Police Services raided a home associated with the EOA Gang and seized 3 kilograms of cocaine (worth $300,000), as well as cutting agents, $60,000 in marijuana, and $24,000 in other assets. In May 2014, a man walking on Kipps Lane was stabbed and robbed. He was sent to hospital with non-lethal injuries. Suspects were ever confirmed. In October 2014, London Police raided a home on Kipps Lane. They arrested two members of the Kipps Lane Crew and seized almost $50,000 in narcotics, including 409.9g of cocaine and 488g of psilocybin. They also found close to $7,000 in cash, along with a minor assortment of various other narcotics.

=== 2015 ===
London Police Service conducted a raid on a member of the Kipps Lane Crew in February 2015. The raid uncovered an illegal firearm (9mm pistol), a bag of marijuana, over $2,000 cash, and some KLC clothing. There was a "T-shirt with a picture of a stick figure pointing a gun at another stick figure bleeding from the head", and a sweatshirt that protests for the release of members who were jailed recently.

On September 6, 2015. A full-patch member of the Gate Keepers MC, Steven Sinclair, was fatally shot outside of a bar on Hamilton Rd. The location was frequently visited by members of the Gate Keepers and Hells Angels. The shooting was committed by a low-level narcotics dealer from Hamilton, Ontario who was hired by an individual whose identity was never discovered, to "leg warmer" (to shoot someone in their legs) Sinclair for $10,000. The man would tell him "There was this guy who ripped me off and disrespected me. I have to show him he can't do that. I cannot be connected with this". The accused waited outside the bar for hours until around 3:00 in the morning, when Sinclair finally exited the building. It all went wrong when Sinclair was mistakenly shot and killed. The deal fell apart and the shooter testified. Hundreds of Hells Angels, Gate Keepers and several other support clubs arrived in London to show their support at Sinclair's funeral.

=== 2020 ===
In July 2020 London Police Service in conjunction with OPP and other law enforcement raided several locations in the province, a former president of the London's "HA" and was previously known as the Teflon biker "because charges against him would not stick", along with other residents of London were arrested and charged with money laundering and this was part of a crackdown on a multi-million dollar illegal gaming racket that was tied to a series of attempted murders, arsons, extortion threats, shootings and assaults. Across southern Ontario 7 were arrested in charge and over 24 million dollars in assets were seized, along with the liquidation of three property development companies with one having built a 7 million dollar home, 8 luxury vehicles and over $175,000 in other illegal contraband.

In mid 2020. A raid was conducted on a London street gang, EOA in 7 locations (6 in London 1 in Brampton) resulting in the arrest of 18 and the seizure of 2.1 kilograms of fentanyl valued at over $720,000, $55,000 in cash and 2 firearms. Making this the largest seizure of fentanyl in the city's history.

== Groups, street gangs and crime syndicates ==
=== Annihilators Motorcycle Club ===
Although the Annihilators clubhouse was for period of time located in Chatham, they were involved in several crimes including murders in the city of London. Their clubhouse would eventually be relocated to St. Thomas and later the nearby Iona Station in the 1990s. The club began to frequently do business in London during this period, and were even referred to as the London Annihilators, as many of the club's members resided in London. This move saw the number of criminal incidents in the city increase. In the mid-1980s, Kellestine became the president of the Annihilators Motorcycle Club in Chatham, when the Holocaust Motorcycle Club "patched-over" to the Richmond Hills-based Annihilators Motorcycle Club. Soon after becoming the Annihilators, they relocated to the town of St. Thomas. In 1991, the club would relocate again to the nearby hamlet of Iona Station. Not long after their St. Thomas clubhouse was raided in 1992, Iona Station is where Kellestine made his residence. He had purchased a $50,000 farm in 1982, and bought the adjoining property in 1987. This acted as the Annihilators new base of operations.

=== Bandidos Motorcycle Club ===
In 2001, the Iona Station-based Loners Motorcycle Club (commonly referred to as the London or St. Thomas Loners, as they operated in both areas and many of the club's members lived in the city of London) patched over to the Canadian branch of the Bandidos. This chapter was redubbed the "London Bandidos" and wore a "London" side rocker displaying the chapters territory., they were involved in the altercation at the 2002 London Motorcycle Show hosted at the Western Fair Complex (part of the Ontario Biker War). They were also involved in the Shedden Massacre in 2006, the trial for which happened in a London court.

=== Boullee Boys ===
Longtime London street gang that has operated on Boullee Street and the surrounding area, they have been involved in several high-profile incidents since the group's creation.

=== Black Shirts Gang (BSG) ===
The Black Shirts are a London, Ontario-based Neo-Nazi gang (presumably named after the nickname given to the Schutzstaffel) that became active in the late 2000s and has been responsible for several high-profile incidents over the years, including multiple hate crimes. The group had multiple members convicted of two separate fatal shootings that occurred in 2011 and a stabbing in 2019. London has some of the highest hate crime rates in Canada.

On June 6, 2021, four members of a Canadian Muslim family were killed when a man purposely targeted them with his vehicle. Involvement of the Black Shirts Gang was alleged by authorities and local citizens; the attack fit the group's ideological nature, and they had been involved in several hate crimes in the past. Nathaniel Veltman was arrested shortly after the incident and charged with four counts of first-degree murder and one count of attempted murder. A link between Veltman and the BSG could not be verified by authorities, but they were able to confirm in March 2022 that he had been accessing white supremacist content via the Dark Web. White supremacist gangs and Neo-Nazi terrorist groups frequently use this method to contact each other and convey information.

CTV news reported that "police also seized several USB flash drives along with two smartphones, a laptop and an external hard drive. They found that the Tor Browser, a web browser used to surf sites on the dark web, was installed on a laptop, as well as desktop shortcuts to launch the browser."

=== EOA (East Of Adelaide) ===
A conglomerate of street gangs and individuals involved in the narcotics trade based in the east end of London, Ontario. These neighborhood gangs are linked together by London Police Service into a single entity known as EOA due to the fact that they are solely all connected to the same supplier. The city's largest organized crime group as a whole.

=== Filthy 15 Motorcycle Club ===
The Filthy 15 MC was created in 2017, to act as a support club for the Outlaws London chapter.

=== First Division ===
Created in 2014, the gang quickly rose to prominence in London earning a spot on "The Seven".

=== FU Crew ===
A London, Ontario-based street gang that started a war with the London charter of the Hells Angels in 2012, affiliates of the Outlaws Motorcycle Club, it has constantly been involved in the city's narcotics trade for the last two decades and was formerly listed as one of "The Seven".

=== Gate Keepers Motorcycle Club ===
The Gate Keepers Motorcycle Club are one of the official support club of the Hells Angels in Canada. The Gate Keepers established their "Middlesex County" Chapter in London in late 2013, and remains active as of 2026. It has been involved in several charity events as well as several incidents.

=== Hells Angels Motorcycle Club ===
The Hells Angels are the largest outlaw motorcycle club in the world and in Canada, with 44 active chapters across the nation as of 2022, Canada possesses the highest number of Hells Angels per capita. The Hells Angels established a probationary chapter in London in early 2001 which, as of 2022, remains active. It has been involved in several charity events and protests against improper treatment of prison inmates as well as several incidents.

=== H-Block ===
Longtime London street gang that operates in a significant area south of Victoria Drive on the North-east side of the city, they have been involved in several high-profile incidents since the group's creation.

=== Outlaws Motorcycle Club ===
The Outlaws are the second largest outlaw motorcycle club in Canada, with 21 active chapters as of 2022, The Outlaws arrived in Canada in 1977 and gained a chapter in London, Ontario after the Satan's Choice "Patched-over" a number of their chapters. It has been involved in several charity events as well as several incidents.

=== Juggalo Gang ===
The Juggalo Gang is a London, Ontario-based street gang, that borrows the name of Insane Clown Posse fans. It shares no connection with the band, The group commonly paints their faces and wield items such as hatchets. According to the London Police Service this group is involved in violent crime and is one of the active street gangs currently being viewed by authorities.

=== Jackels Motorcycle Club ===
A now defunct support club of the Hells Angels that had chapters in London, Ontario and Montreal. Was active in the late 1990s and early 2000s and was a participant in the Ontario Biker War. It was at some point absorbed into the Hells Angels.

=== Kipps Lane Crew ===
The Kipps Lane Crew (KLC) is a street gang founded in London, Ontario, Canada, in 2000. The gang's name originates from the area in which the group operates, Kipps Lane and the surrounding area in Northeast London. The colors of the Kipps Lane Crew are red, although the gang is not associated with the Bloods, the group has been involved in several high-profile incidents and its actions partially contributed towards the creation of the London "Gang Unit".

=== Ku Klux Klan: London chapter ===
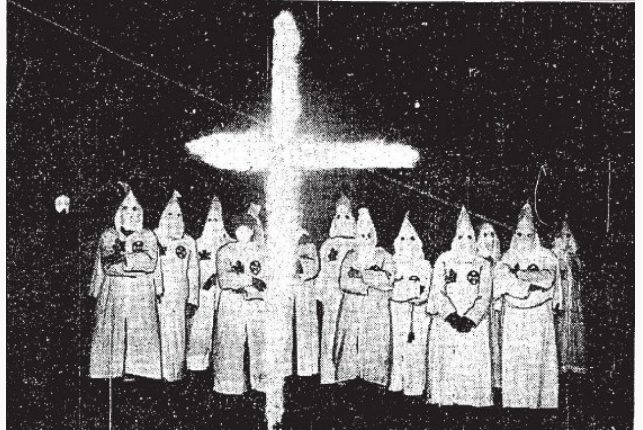
A Klan cross-burning ceremony in London, Ontario, in late 1925

The history of the Ku Klux Klan in London, Ontario began on May 18, 1872. When the former leader of the KKK in South Carolina, J. Rufus Bratton arrived in London, Ontario and remained there until the 1880s. During this period he began secretly making major contributions to the construction of the London chapter. In 1882, the most notorious incident in the London area occurred when London Klansmen set fire to the Harrison residence. The Harrisons were an African-American family that had escaped slavery in Kentucky and Missouri, then fled to Canada in 1854 via the Underground Railroad.

Bratton returned to America in the 1880s, but left behind an influence on the community that would see the rise of the Ku Klux Klan in London, Ontario during the 1890s and 1900s. By the 1920s the rise of the "Second Klan" in the United States had further spurred on expansion and recruitment in Canada, this saw membership in London reach an all-time high. Though they would never regain the numbers in membership they possessed in the 1920s, the Knights of the Ku Klux Klan continued to operate in London and Ontario well into the 2000s, with some holdouts even continuing into the modern day.

=== Loners Motorcycle Club ===
The Loners Motorcycle Club operated a chapter in London, with their clubhouse located in the nearby hamlet of Iona Station. This occurred when the Annihilators Motorcycle Club patched over in 1999. They operated in the area for two years until merging with the Bandidos in late 2001. Several members would also join the Hells Angels in the split that occurred in 2001. When the Hells Angels opened a probationary chapter in London Ontario, in 2001, most of its members consisted of former Loners.

=== Ontario Wide Crew ===
Ontario Wide Crew(OWC) was created in 2013, the gang quickly rose to prominence in London earning a spot on "The Seven".

=== Pond Mills Crew ===
A long time street gang that operates in the neighborhood of Pond Mills and the surrounding area in London's Southside.

=== Satan's Choice ===
At some point in the late 1970s the Satans choice opened a chapter in London, Ontario. The chapter was still very young when it was patched over to the Outlaws Motorcycle Club in 1977, becoming the Outlaws London chapter.

In May 2026, the London Free Press reported that Satan's Choice, which was restarted by Harley Guindon, opened a chapter in London.

=== The Wheeled Bandits ===
A London, Ontario-based group responsible for conducting the first bank robbery in Canadian history using a motor vehicle to flee the scene of the crime. The Wheeled Bandits was the name given to the group by the authorities after they robbed the Merchants Bank using an automobile to escape the police on December 1, 1920.

=== Queensman Motorcycle Club ===
The Queensman Motorcycle Club was formally active in London during the 1970s and 1980s, but at some point the London chapter relocated to the nearby hamlet of Iona Station, where it remains as of 2022. It has several chapters in the surrounding area including Windsor, Chatham and Amherstburg.

=== The WMKrew ===
Little is known about this "Unknown Group" referred to as The Crew. Loosely based yet very sophisticated. Reports of membership as low as 20 but known to be responsible for multiple organized crimes including drug/ gun trafficking, sale of stolen property, fraud, arson, and murder linked to multiple members of the loosely based street gang currently incarcerated for murder in southern Ontario stretching from Windsor to Toronto with most affiliates living in London. Multiple unsolved crimes including gang related shooting are suspected to have been carried out by members. Large quantity drug sales are attributed to this "crew". Members are known for their brutality invoked in the drugtrade.

== See also ==
- Gangs in Canada
- List of gangs in Canada

== Books ==
- Langton, Jerry (2010), Showdown: How the Outlaws, Hells Angels and Cops Fought for Control of the Streets, John Wiley & Sons, ISBN 978-0470678787
- Schneider, Stephen (2009), Iced: The Story of Organized Crime in Canada, John Wiley & Sons, ISBN 978-0470835005
