= Kipps Lane Crew =

Canadian street gang

- Founded: 2000; 26 years ago
- Founding location: London, Ontario, Canada
- Years active: 2000s – present
- Territory: Northeast London
- Ethnicity: Multiracial
- Membership (est.): Estimated 100 members at peak
- Criminal activities: Drug trafficking, murder, assault, extortion, robbery, burglary, grand theft

The Kipps Lane Crew (KLC) is a street gang founded in London, Ontario, Canada, in 2000. The gang's name originates from the area in which the group operates, Kipps Lane and the surrounding area in Northeast London. The colours of the Kipps Lane Crew are red, although the gang is not associated with the Bloods.

== History ==
The Kipps Lane Crew was founded in the 2000s in London, Ontario's Northeast end and was able to keep a low profile during the early years of its existence, although the group began to gain notoriety in the late 2000s. Known by the graffiti tag KLC, the gang grew into one of London's largest and most reckless street gangs during the 2010s. The KLC is one of the eleven street gangs currently being monitored by the London Police Service. The actions of the KLC, and other organized crime groups in the city, led to the creation of the London Gang Unit in 2012. Up until this point, the closest thing to a SGU had been the police force's youth and hate crime unit. Due to its size, activities and notoriety, the gang is among what London authorities call the "Big Seven" referring to the seven largest street gangs in the city. The group is mostly involved in the trade and trafficking of narcotics, but its crimes range from burglary, robbery to assault and murder.

== Notable crimes ==
On February 14, 2009, the alleged leader of the KLC, Matthew Owen, was stabbed and killed during an altercation at an East London residence, and another member and two others were injured. It is not known what started the incident, but a fight erupted and spread into the backyard of the residence, as someone smashed through the patio door. Authorities say several people were involved in the brawl.

In 2011 a member of the Kipps Lane Crew was sentenced to five years in prison for "possession of a loaded and prohibited firearm, and for the killing of Thi Tran". Also in 2011, a member of the Kipps Lane Crew saw members of an opposing group in Jack's Bar on Richmond St. He fired multiple shots from a handgun into the business. No one was killed, but an innocent bystander was shot and injured. The KLC member was sentenced to 12 years in prison for the incident.

In August 2012, a member of the Kipps Lane Crew shot a man near Queens and Adelaide Street. The man survived the attack, but these events led to a 5-hour standoff on a Kipps Lane property. London Police brought in their tactical response unit (SWAT equivalent), a Police modified APC (armoured personnel carrier) and created a perimeter around the residence. The result was the arrest of four members, or affiliates, and the confiscation of a "shotgun and almost 1,900 rounds of various types of ammunition, a taser, pepper spray, stolen IDs and a small amount of methamphetamine". Over 16 charges were handed out to the four individuals.

In May 2014, a man walking on Kipps Lane was stabbed and robbed, and was sent to the hospital with non-lethal injuries. The suspects behind the attack were never confirmed. In October 2014, London Police raided a home on Kipps Lane. They arrested two members and seized almost $50,000 in narcotics, including 409.9 grams of cocaine, 488 grams of psilocybin, 26 grams of marijuana, 3 grams of crystal meth, 315 milligrams of Adderall pills, 2 grams of hash and 1 gram of hash oil. They also found close to $7,000 in cash

London police conducted a raid on a member of the Kipps Lane Crew in February 2015. The raid uncovered an illegal firearm (9mm pistol), a bag of marijuana, over $2,000 in cash, and some KLC swag. "A t-shirt with a picture of a stick figure pointing a gun at another stick figure bleeding from the head", and a sweatshirt that protests for the release of members who were jailed recently.

In June 2016, a stabbing occurred at an apartment complex on Kipps Lane, after which one man was sent to the hospital with serious injuries. The KLC was initially believed to be involved by authorities until the actual suspect, a 61-year-old man, was detained and charged.

On April 7, 2019, London Police heard reports of shots being fired in the Kipps Lane area at 2:55 am. Authorities found no evidence of a shooting at the time, but hours later there was reports of a second series of shots just north of Kipps Lane. Police that arrived on scene noted that they did find evidence of a firearm being discharged as well as evidence of someone being injured. No suspects or weapons were found in connection with the shootings.

In April 2020, London Police conducted raids on multiple properties in the city, including Kipps Lane. Four people were arrested and charged, and 634 grams of cocaine valued at $63,000 was seized, along with one firearm and close to $12,000. Around $500 in other narcotics were found along with a cocaine press and three burner phones. Two individuals faced a combined 13 drug and weapons-related charges, with one receiving 5 weapons charges and the other being charged with "possession of a schedule I substance for the purpose of trafficking." On May 2, 2020, a London residence on Talbot Street was a target of a drive by shooting. No one was injured in the shooting, and on May 4, 2020, an alleged leader of the Kipps Lane Crew and two other members were arrested in connection with the shooting. The 3 members faced 14 charges including "discharging a firearm in a reckless manner, occupying a vehicle with a firearm, failing to stop for police and possession of a restricted or prohibited firearm without a licence", along with 5 other firearms related charges.

In November 2020, a member of the Kipps Lane Crew was arrested. Police seized a pistol, flip knife and more than $50,000 in bills. The member faced 10 counts, including "carrying a concealed weapon, unauthorized possession of a restricted firearm, possessing a firearm knowing the serial number has been tampered with, resisting a police officer, mischief and possessing cocaine".

== See also ==
- Gangs in Canada
  - List of gangs in Canada
  - Organized crime in London, Ontario
