= London Police =

London Police may refer to:

== Current ==
- City of London Police, the police force for the square-mile sized district known as the City of London
- Metropolitan Police, the police force for Greater London, excluding the City of London
- London Police Service, the police force for London, Ontario, Canada

== Historical ==
- Bow Street Runners (1749-1839), called London's first professional police force
- Marine Police Force (1798-1839), said to be England's first police force, merged into the Metropolitan Police Service

== See also ==
- List of law enforcement agencies in the United Kingdom, Crown Dependencies and British Overseas Territories#National forces and agencies
