= Gangs of London =

Gangs of London may refer to:

- Gangs of London (TV series), a 2020 British-American TV series
- Gangs of London (video game), a 2006 game for the Sony PSP

== See also ==
- Gangs in London, real-life criminal activity in the UK capital
- Organized crime in London, Ontario
