= Cournoyer =

Cournoyer is a surname of French Canadian origin, denoting someone who lived at a farm with a walnut tree. Notable people with the surname include:

- Charle Cournoyer (born 1991), Canadian skater
- Chris Cournoyer (born 1970), American politician
- Ève Cournoyer (1969–2012), Canadian singer-songwriter
- Gérard Cournoyer (1912–1973), Canadian politician and lawyer
- Jean Cournoyer (born 1934), Canadian politician
- Jimmy Cournoyer (born 1979), Canadian drug trafficker
- Julie Cournoyer (born 1970/71), Canadian para-cyclist
- Michèle Cournoyer (born 1943), Canadian animator
- Normand Cournoyer (born 1951), Canadian ice hockey player
- Réjean Cournoyer (born 1971), Canadian actor and singer
- René Cournoyer (born 1997), Canadian artistic gymnast
- Yvan Cournoyer (born 1943), Canadian ice hockey player
