= Gangs in Canada =

Gangs in Canada are mostly present in the major urban areas of Canada, although their activities are not confined to large cities.

== Types ==
The most prevalent gangs in Canada include:

- Street gangs
- Outlaw Motorcycle Gangs
- Mafias and Organized crime groups, including Aboriginal-based organized crime, Indian organized crime, and East Asian organized crime
- Drug cartels

According to a 2004 police report, "The Hells Angels remain some of the largest and most powerful motorcycle gangs in the country, with growing influence in British Columbia and Ontario. Its presence has declined in other provinces due to police efforts, internal conflict and increased competition from other crime groups."

The same report stated that Aboriginal street gangs are not as highly organized as other criminal organizations in Canada, but are amongst the most violent. Aboriginal people also constitute a significant portion of prison populations throughout Canada, and the number of First Nation inmates continues to rise at a considerable rate. As of 2005 it is believed over 1000 Aboriginal youths were members of street gangs.

According to the Criminal Intelligence Service Canada (CISC), "The established, well-financed and -connected Hong Kong Triad groups and crime syndicates remain, to our mind, the biggest long-term threat to Canadian law enforcement and society."

In addition to Triad Societies, other Asian criminal groups, such as The Big Circle Gang, have also established national networks based in the major cities of Canada.

== By city ==
=== Calgary ===
Major crime groups in Calgary include first and foremost, Aboriginal street gangs, Middle Eastern/Lebanese organized crime gangs, Punjabi street gangs biker gangs, and Black street gangs. Among others are East Asian (Chinese/Vietnamese) street gangs, Mexican drug cartels, Somali, Ethiopian and Sudanese drug trafficking groups, Afghan Street Gangs and Pakistani street gangs.

Between 2002 and 2009, there was a bloody gang war between two rival East Asian gangs the FK and FOB gangs which resulted in 25 gang related murders. East Asians were not the only group involved in gang violence. There were also White/Italian, (East) Indian, and, in some cases, Black gang members of these gangs. Disputes over the illegal distribution of fentanyl have broken out within the Middle Eastern community (with some being Lebanese). Similar to the Asian street gangs of the early 2000s, these are not therefore from exclusively one ethnicity.

On 1 January 2009, a group of men walked into a Vietnamese restaurant, Bolsa, in the Acadia area of South Calgary, and opened fire, killing three men. One of the men was a non-intended bystander. Two gunmen, Michael Roberto and Nathan Zuccherato, were sentenced in 2011 to 25 years imprisonment for the killings. A third man was charged in the deaths, but pleaded guilty to an accessory. The two gunmen were also involved or responsible for a restaurant shooting in Calgary in 2008.

=== Edmonton ===
Major crime groups in Edmonton have been identified as most being Aboriginal, Black (Central African/Jamaican/Somali), Middle Eastern (Persian/Lebanese), East Asian (Chinese/Vietnamese) and Central/Eastern European across a similar broad social spectrum. With other crime groups involved in Edmonton as well such as Hispanic gangs, biker gangs, Aryan Nation groups, and Punjabi street gangs.

However recently the arrival of Mexican drug traffickers, along with increased activity by outlaw motorcycle gangs, is changing the face of organized crime in Alberta especially in the major cities of Edmonton along with Calgary.

=== Halifax ===
Biker gangs have, at various points, played a major role in Halifax's crime scene, particularly during the 1980s and 1990s. However, there has been a crackdown on biker gang activity throughout Eastern Canada, in the wake of the Quebec Biker War. Most biker gangs are composed of extended families or of close associates, providing little scope for recruitment or promotion from outside. The well-known Bloods and Crips have been part of Halifax's gang environment as well.

=== Hamilton ===
The area in and around Hamilton was once home to organized crime figure Rocco Perri, and Johnny Papalia of the Papalia crime family. Murders of traditional mobsters in 2017 and 2018 indicate that the group is still active. After the September 2018 killing of real estate agent Al Iavarone, police sources told the Toronto Star that the hit was in retaliation for previous actions against the Musitano crime family as part of a "dispute between two Niagara Region groups of mobsters who are both tied to the New York State [Buffalo] mob." A news report stated that "there has been a resurgence of mafia-related crime in the Greater Toronto and Hamilton Area in the last couple of years, leading police to believe there may be a 'power struggle'". On 30 January 2019, Cece Luppino, son of Rocco Luppino of the Luppino crime family, was killed in front of his parents' Hamilton home. Several outlaw motorcycle clubs also call and have called Hamilton home. These include the Hells Angels, Bacchus Motorcycle Club and the Loners Motorcycle Club. The notorious Satan's Choice as well as the Outlaws Motorcycle Club have also operated in Hamilton.

=== Montreal ===
Gangs in Montreal are mostly European (most Italian, French, Irish and Russian) but there are minority gangs which are mostly of Jamaican, Haitian, Hispanic, Lebanese, Asian, Sri Lankan, or Cambodian descent. United smaller street gangs made up of mostly youths are pocketed in different areas of the Montreal area, particularly in Montréal-Nord, St-Michel, Parc-Extension, Ville Saint-Laurent (St-Lo), Côte-des-Neiges, NDG, Rivière-des-Prairies, Saint-François, Laval and St-Léonard neighbourhoods. Montreal Haitian street gangs are the oldest known Haitian street gang in Canada. Forming around 1980 which were called the Bélanger and the Master B. The goal of these first street gangs was to protect the Haitian community against racism from the local population including harassment from the Montreal police. Street gangs introduced break dancing and hip hop culture to Montreal. At the beginning there was no crime related activities from these gangs who had mostly a peaceful mentality in general.

=== Ottawa ===
Major crime groups in Ottawa involve biker gangs, Arab street gangs, and East Asian crime groups. Many other crime groups also exist such as East African street gangs. In Ottawa, by the early 21st-century, drive by shootings were rare and most gang activity involved narcotic distribution.

=== Saskatchewan ===
Adult gangs in the province of Saskatchewan are almost entirely aboriginal based. The largest gang activity is in Regina and Saskatoon. There is also a branches of the Hells Angels, Outlaws Motorcycle Club and Rock Machine in the province. Youth gangs are also almost entirely aboriginal based. Saskatchewan had the highest concentration of gang membership in Canada at 1.34 per 1,000 in 2002. There are possibly 108 street gangs in the Prairie region.

=== Greater Toronto Area ===
Certain neighbourhoods in Toronto have experienced gang and organized crime activity including human trafficking, firearm trafficking, drug trafficking, robbery, and Mafia/mob activity.

A police survey found that most youth gangs in Ontario and the GTA are ethnically African/Caribbean (Somali/Jamaican/Haitian/Ethiopian/Guyanese), Caucasian (Italian/Russian/Portuguese/Albanian/Polish/Greek/Spanish), and South Asian (Indian/Punjabi/Pakistani/Tamil). There are also a number of East Asian and Latino gangs in the area as well as West Asian mainly being (Iranian/Arab).

Although Toronto's murder rate remains low, there has been a recent rise in gun violence in the downtown core. The two most focal incidents were the Boxing Day shooting, a shootout between rival gangs that resulted in the death of 15-year-old bystander Jane Creba on 26 December 2005, on Yonge Street, and a mall food court shooting at the Eaton Centre on 2 June 2012, which left two dead and injured seven others, including a 13-year-old boy. Hassan was considered to be the targeted victim and is considered to be gang-affiliated while others were considered innocent bystanders.

In June 2015, RCMP led police raids across the Greater Toronto Area, named Project OPhoenix, which resulted in the arrest of 19 men, allegedly affiliated with the 'Ndrangheta. Testimony during the trial revealed that the crime group was still very active as recently as 2015, with activities in mortgage and bank fraud as well as cocaine trafficking.

Giuseppe (Pino) Ursino and Romanian-born Cosmin (Chris) Dracea of Toronto faced two counts of cocaine trafficking for the benefit of a criminal organization and one charge of conspiracy to commit an indictable offence. The 2018 trial in Ontario Superior Court in Toronto was the first in Canada to target the 'Ndrangheta as an organized crime group since the Criminal Code was amended in 1997 to include the concept of a criminal organization. Granted, neither of the defendants admitted to having been part of that organization. Both were convicted of conspiracy to smuggle drugs. At the sentencing, the presiding judge had made this comment: "Based on the evidence at trial, Giuseppe Ursino is a high-ranking member of the 'Ndrangheta who orchestrated criminal conduct and then stepped back to lessen his potential implication ... Cosmin Dracea knew he was dealing with members of a criminal organization when he conspired to import cocaine".

After the Ursino/Dracea trial, Tom Andreopoulos, deputy chief federal prosecutor, offered this comment about the organization:

"We're talking about structured organized crime. We're talking about a political entity, almost; a culture of crime that colonizes across the sea from Italy to Canada. This is one of the most sophisticated criminal organizations in the world."

In June 2018, Cosimo Ernesto Commisso, of Vaughan, and an unrelated woman were shot and killed. According to sources contacted by the Toronto Star, "Commisso was related to Cosimo "The Quail" Commisso of Siderno, Italy, considered by police there to be an 'Ndrangheta organized crime boss" of the Siderno Group. On 16 August 2019, Paolo Caputo of Richmond Hill was shot and killed at his restaurant in Toronto. According to the Toronto Star, police sources said that Caputo was a longtime associate of Montreal mob leader Vito Rizzuto, who died in 2013.

During the investigation of the apparent mob hit of Albert Iavarone in September 2018, a Police investigator made this comment about organized crime. "If you look back over the last couple years there has been a number of murders, a number of bombings, a number of arsons throughout the GTA and up to as far as Montreal. It is our belief that there is something going on in the underworld. We are not sure if this particular case factors into that but is something we are alive to".

==== Brampton ====
Known crime groups in Brampton include mainly South Asian and Black gangs but there are a few White, Portuguese, and Filipino gangs in the city.

==== Scarborough ====
There are dozens of tribes of gangs in Scarborough, but the most common ones that are seen are the Afghan street gangs, Tamil street gangs, Chinese street gangs, West Indian (Caribbean) street gangs and Pakistani street gangs.

=== London ===
London, Ontario, for much of its history has been what is referred to as a "biker town"; several motorcycle clubs have operated in London and the surrounding area. The Queensman Motorcycle Club established a chapter in London during the 1970s and had multiple run-ins with law enforcement lasting till the late 1980s. The Annihilators Motorcycle Club operated in the nearby Hamlet of Iona station and was frequently referred to as the London Annihilators due to the fact the club did business and was actively involved in incidents in city during the 1980s and 1990s. In 1999 the Annihilators would "patch-over" to the Loners Motorcycle Club, a Canadian-based motorcycle club with chapters located worldwide. The Loners would also frequently operate in London owning several businesses. When the London chapter of the Hells Angels was formed in 2001, most of its members came from the Loners during a split. The other members of the Loners would join the Bandidos Motorcycle Club in late 2001.

The Bandidos also operated several businesses and were involved in several incidents in London such as their participation during the incident at the 2002 London motorcycle show. They were also involved in the infamous Shedden massacre that occurred in 2006 which resulted in the Bandidos Canada disbanding. Most of the trial took place in London's courthouse. Three major motorcycle organizations currently have chapters and operate businesses in the city. The Hells Angels are the largest outlaw motorcycle club in Canada, having an estimated 13 full-patch members and 100+ affiliates in the city. The Gate Keepers Motorcycle Club, a Hells Angels support club with chapters in Nova Scotia and Ontario, also have a charter in London. The Outlaws Motorcycle Club, the longtime rivals of the Hells Angels, have stepped up efforts in recent years to re-establish a presence in London, reopening their local chapter and establishing a support club, the Filthy 15 MC. The city has also seen several notable incidents such as Ontario Biker War and the London Conflict.

The larger organizations supply a stream of illegal contraband and narcotics to multiple localized street gangs operating throughout the city. Often involved in the drug trade, gang members and affiliates are often suspects in break-ins, vehicle thefts, street rip robberies, stabbings and assaults. Gang members were linked to several shootings over the past two decades. Despite a lack of news coverage in the early 2000s, the street gangs began to gain notoriety in the 2010s when a turf war broke out in 2012 between the London charter of the Hells Angels MC and a local Street gang backed by the London charter of the Outlaws Motorcycle Club, this resulted in the deaths of several individuals, the arson of several biker and gang owned businesses and vehicles, with some of the bikers fleeing town temporarily. When looking at the city's street gangs, Biker and organized crime analyst Yves Lavigne stated,

"These gangs are very dangerous, there are different levels of gangs, If the police are giving you the names of "the seven"(referring to the 7 largest street gangs monitored by the police), they must be the high rollers. These are the guys with guns and contacts with guys from outside London with access to the drugs," Lavigne said.

Most gangs in the city had managed to remain "under the radar" up until this point Lavigne would add:

"No one had any idea about these gangs until this week, except for the people in the neighbourhoods they terrorize".

A lead investigator for the London Police Service had this to state:

"London's 11 known street gangs aren't necessarily divided along geographic or ethnic lines. Most are multi-ethnic and multicultural. One might have roots in a neighbourhood but members tend to join from all over".

These events resulted in the creation of the London Police Service's gang unit. From the years between 2012 and mid-2015, they made over 400 arrests, laid 270 charges relating to narcotics, seized over 40 weapons and made 375 other criminal charges on members of the city's organized crime. The city has also had previous association with Hamilton-based Mafia families, there is also several Neo-Nazi and Nationalist groups in the city with its overall hate crime rate being higher in London (6.4 incidents per 100,000 population) than in Ontario (5.3) and Canada (4.9) in 2018. Between 2014 and 2018, the rate of police-reported hate crime in London increased by 78%, a notably larger increase compared with Ontario (+10%) and nation-wide (+33%). On 21 February 2014, the London Police Service raided a home and seized 3 kilograms of cocaine worth $300,000 as well as cutting agents$, 60,000 in marijuana and $24,000 in other assets.

On 6 September 2015, a Full-Patch member of the Gatekeepers MC, Steven Sinclair, was shot dead outside of a biker owned club house on Hamilton Rd. The shooting was committed by a low-level drug dealer from Hamilton who was hired by a competing organization to "leg warmer" (the act of shooting someone in their legs) Sinclair for $10,000 to fund his drug operation. The man would tell him "There was this guy who ripped me off and disrespected me. I have to show him he can't do that." It would go wrong however when Sinclair was mistakenly shot and killed. The shooter ended up testifying. Hundreds of Hells Angels, Gatekeepers and several other support clubs arrived in London to show their support for Sinclair's funeral. In 2018, The London Police Service reported an overall crime rate of 5,963 incidents per 100,000 population, 45% higher than in Ontario (4,113) and 9% higher than nation-wide (5,488). In September 2018 a member of an East London Street gang was gunned down in the parking lot of Tim Hortons on Dundas street. In May 2019, a nearly 200 strong motorcycle convoy drove through central London, no complaints were issued from the citizens of London but they were monitored by Ontario's biker enforcement unit and the London Police Service.

In July 2020, the London Police Service in conjunction with the Ontario Provincial Police and other law enforcement agencies raided several locations in the province, a former president of the London's "HA" and previously known as the Teflon biker because charges against him would not stick, along with other residents of London were arrested and charged with money laundering; this was part of a crackdown on a multi-million dollar illegal gaming racket that was tied to a series of attempted murders, arsons, extortion threats, shootings and assaults. Across southern Ontario, seven were arrested in charge and over 24 million dollars in assets were seized, along with the liquidation of three property development companies with one having built a 7 million dollar home, eight luxury vehicles and over $175,000 in other illegal contraband. In mid 2020, a raid on a London street gang in seven locations (six in London, one in Brampton) resulted in the arrest of 18 and the seizure of 2.1 kilograms of fentanyl valued at over $720,000, $55,000 in cash and two firearms. Raids on local bikers and street gangs continued. With there being a large raid in March 2021 that resulted in 2 million dollars of narcotics including cocaine, cannabis, hash, psilocybin and MDMA being seized along with 350,000 in cash. In addition, 31 firearms, 81 grenades, two grenade launchers, three explosive projectiles and 22 other prohibited devices were seized. On 28 September 2021, a London Police Service raid resulted in the arrest of four and the seizure of over $265,000 in narcotics. 708 grams of cocaine, 754 grams of fentanyl, 131 grams of crystal methamphetamine, 3,000 grams of the cutting agent phenacetin, firearms were also seized. During the beginning of 2021 there have been over 15 shootings in London, set to outpace the previous year, with the London Police Service calling it an evident surge in gun violence.

==== Brantford ====
Brantford has a heavy presence of biker and street gangs of predominantly White and some Aboriginal origin. Smaller groups of Asian, Hispanic, and Black gangs also play a role in the city's gang violence, but to a lesser extent. Multiple task forces have been deployed in the city to curb the gang violence that has been exploding since the 1970s.

=== Metro Vancouver ===
According to law enforcement agencies, the most significant crime groups in Vancouver are the motorcycle gangs (such as the Hells Angels), East Asian street gangs (mostly Vietnamese drug gangs/Asian-Chinese Triads), and Punjabi street gangs, although others exist (mainly Eastern European, Persian, or Italian Based groups) Other minor crime groups quite often Mexican drug cartels, and Aboriginal street gangs are also seen in the metro area. However, in recent years, "multicultural" street gangs have grown significantly in power and prominence, and have attained much media attention due to their involvement in numerous shootings and slayings throughout the city, including the 2009 Vancouver gang war.

According to the Combined Forces Special Enforcement Unit of British Columbia the ethnicities of people who died from a total of 160 gang related deaths in British Columbia between January 2006 to March 2014 were:

▸ Caucasian/White (74 victims; 46.3%)

▸ South Asian (predominantly Punjabis) (34 victims; 21.3%)

▸ East Asian (most Chinese or Vietnamese) (33 victims; 20.6%)

▸ West Asian (mostly Iranian) (10 victims; 6.3%)

▸ First Nations (6 victims; 3.8%)

▸ Hispanic (3 victims; 1.9%)

▸ African/Caribbean (0 victims; 0%)

==== Abbotsford ====
Known crime groups in Abbotsford involve Punjabi street gangs, various East Asian crime groups, motorcycle gangs, and multicultural street gangs.

However, there has been a gang conflict in the city. The conflict was primarily in the West End part of the city in the Townhill Area. The gang conflict is between two South Asian gangs which involves 40 men in total between the ages of 15 and 25.

The Abbotsford Youth Crime Prevention Project has assessed groups of people deemed to be most vulnerable to becoming part of a gang in the city.

==== Burnaby ====
Criminal gangs in Burnaby are composed of elements of most ethnic groupings within Vancouver.

==== Surrey ====
Major crime groups in the city are the South Asian (predominantly Punjabi) street gangs, South-East Asian (mainly Vietnamese) street gangs, biker gangs. Gangs have operated in Surrey, leading to an increase in the murder rate, although this almost ceased; the police claimed this was because the perpetrators had left the country. Most gangs within the city today battle out in Surrey's Newton community, predominantly (but inexclusively) amongst the South Asian community.

=== Winnipeg ===
Winnipeg's gang activity consists heavily of Aboriginal and black criminals. There is a smaller number of other ethnic groups in the city - namely Europeans and South-East Asians (Filipino/Vietnamese). Winnipeg has been described as the Aboriginal gang capital of Canada.

== See also ==
- List of gangs in Canada
- Crime in Canada
