= Barr Settlement, Nova Scotia =

Community in Nova Scotia, Canada

Barr Settlement
- Location within Nova Scotia
- Coordinates: 45°8′17″N 63°37′41″W
- Country: Canada
- Province: Nova Scotia
- County: Hants County
- Municipality: East Hants Municipality
- Time zone: UTC-4 (AST)
  - Summer (DST): UTC-3 (ADT)
- Canadian Postal Code: B2S
- Area code: 902
- Telephone Exchange: 259, 883
- NTS Map: 011E04
- GNBC Code: CABUT

Barr Settlement is an unincorporated community in the Canadian province of Nova Scotia, located in East Hants Municipality in Hants County. Its name comes from the Barr family who came from Ireland. A land grant in the area was given to John Grant on January 11, 1810.
