= Original Red Devils Motorcycle Club =

Canadian outlaw motorcycle club

- Emblem of the Original Red Devils
- Founded: 1948; 78 years ago
- Founded by: Charles Knapp
- Founding location: Hamilton, Ontario, Canada
- Years active: 1948–2014 (operated 66 years)
- Territory: Ontario (3 chapters)
- Membership (est.): At peak 100+ 30–40 in 2010s
- Allies: Bacchus MC

The Original Red Devils Motorcycle Club was a Canadian outlaw motorcycle club based in Southern Ontario, it was founded in Hamilton in 1948, making it one of Canada's oldest Motorcycle Club. The club originally went by "Red Devils", however to differentiate themselves as the original from the other motorcycle clubs using similar names they added the "Original" onto the front of their name.

== History ==
The Original Red Devils Motorcycle Club was founded in Hamilton Ontario in 1948 making it one of the country's oldest Motorcycle Club, it remained around the Hamilton area for quite a long time until expanding to Chatham-Kent, Ontario in 2001 and Sudbury, Ontario in January 2014. Unlike other motorcycle clubs that have met their tragic end, or are aggressively expanded across the globe, the Red Devils stayed small and managed to remain well respected by other motorcycle clubs in Ontario. The club had a history of being involved in charities as many are. They would end up patching over to long-time ally Bacchus Motorcycle Club in late 2014, with their three chapters Hamilton, Chatham-Kent, and Sudbury joining Bacchus MC. All Bacchus MC and Original Red Devils MC members also sport a brotherhood patch depicting the lasting 1% bond between the two clubs.

Peter Edwards, a veteran Toronto Star crime reporter and author of several books on motorcycle gangs, said.

"The Red Devils have been smart enough to stay out of people's way, stay quiet and not offend other bikers. They don't take in "heat scores" — people who attract the attention of police. They don't act like clowns, chase after other bikers' wives; they don't have big egos. "They're not trying to get rich or rule the world," Edwards said. All of this has led to the Red Devils being "comfortable in their own skin," and have good relationships with other clubs, including the Hells Angels. There is something very Canadian about the Original Red Devils. They're not into the glitz," Edwards said.

The Original Red Devils MC were listed as an Outlaw Motorcycle Gang by Criminal Intelligence Service Canada.

== Criminal allegations and incidents ==
On 9 May 1984, multiple shots were fired into the Red Devils Mother chapter clubhouse. Full-patch member of the Red Devils Michael Carey was killed at age 32. The Devil's then began to reinforce the clubhouse with a cinderblock and rebar wall to defend against any future attacks. In 2000, The Original Red Devils clubhouse in Hamilton was raided by Hamilton Police, the police would blow through the compounds front gate and would use battering rams to break down the doors before tossing concussion grenades inside the clubhouse. The raids resulted in the capture of three illegal firearms, ammunition and narcotics.

On 1 December 2010, police execute search warrants on multiple properties and charge three members of the Original Red Devils Motorcycle Club, along with a woman, of running an unauthorized lottery. The searches also uncovered marijuana, ecstasy, ammunition and cash. On the 19th of November, 2011, Ontario Provincial Police raided the Original Red Devil's clubhouse in Chatham. They had a warrant to search the premises in a belief that an illegal bar was being operated without a proper liquor license, the raid resulted in police seizing 13 40 US fl oz (1,200 ml) bottles of liquor, 120+ beers and $2000 cash. Two arrests were made, with one member charged with possession of a prohibited weapon. The other man was charged with assaulting a police officer during the raid.

On August 9, 2014, Steve Marcotte a 44-year-old longtime member of the Original Red Devil's died in crash between his motorcycle and a tractor. Both vehicles were headed south on Upper Centennial Parkway in Stoney Creek when police say the tractor cut in front and sent Marcotte flying. These events tragically resulted in his death. Marcotte, whose family said "he fulfilled a longtime dream of becoming a full patch member a couple of years ago", was a "super guy" who "worked hard" as a contractor and was a "family guy", Philip said.

Local authorities called it a hit and run, and later found the tractor abandoned in a field nearby. Hamilton Police charged David Bobor, 45, a former member of the Original Red Devils, with driving the tractor and fleeing the scene, knowing Marcotte was dead. According to documents, Bobor lives around the corner from the area the incident occurred. But a man at the home, who identified himself as Bobor's brother, said David Bobor doesn't live there. He remained in jail until his scheduled bail appearance in court on September 9, 2014.

Bobor left the Red Devils in good standing about a decade ago. He and Marcotte knew each other, but it's not clear what they were doing together that night. As far as Philip is concerned, the whole thing is a sad accident that has nothing to do with club business. He and other Red Devils do not plan to attend any of the court case and are only concerned about Marcotte's family, for whom they've raised money, he said.

"They're part of the family," he said. "They're always welcome." After Marcotte's funeral, the club and other bikers rode in procession to the Red Devils' clubhouse.

== See also ==
- List of gangs in Canada
