= Bacchus Motorcycle Club =

Outlaw motorcycle club

Bacchus MC
- Emblem of the Bacchus Motorcycle Club
- Abbreviation: BMC
- Founded: August 1972; 54 years ago
- Founded at: Albert County, New Brunswick, Canada
- Type: Motorcycle Club
- Region served: Atlantic Canada and Ontario
- Members: 200
- Website: bacchuscanada.ca

The Bacchus Motorcycle Club (BMC) is an Outlaw motorcycle club in Canada. Founded during 1972 in Albert County, New Brunswick. Bacchus MC has since increased its influence, expanding to seventeen chapters in five Canadian provinces. It is currently the third largest Canadian established 1% motorcycle club.

== History ==
Founded in Albert County, New Brunswick, in late August 1972, the Bacchus Motorcycle Club is one of the oldest one-percenter motorcycle clubs in Canada. They are named for the Roman name of Dionysus, whose cult was known for bacchanalia.

The Bacchus Club had long been closely allied to many clubs in Toronto. In 1997, the Para-Dice Riders became closely allied to the Hells Angels, which likewise pulled the Bacchus into the Hells Angels sphere of friendly clubs. In 2003, the Hells Angels Halifax chapter was shut down, and Bacchus was able to expand their presence in Atlantic Canada.

Three members of the Bacchus Halifax chapter were convicted in Prince Edward Island on charges of trafficking cocaine, ecstasy, marijuana and other drugs. On 10 January 2010, six members of the East Coast Riders pulled up to the Bacchus clubhouse in Hillsborough, New Brunswick to perform a ceremony where they burned their old biker jackets and put on new biker jackets with the Bacchus patch. Paul Fowler, the president of the Bacchus Halifax chapter told the media: "We are far from organized, and we're not a crime group either.".

On 26 February 2010, in Barr Settlement, a Bacchus member, James "Rustie" Hall along with his wife Ellen, were found murdered in their house. No one has ever been charged in the murders. On 18 July 2010, 16 members of various Bacchus chapters from New Brunswick and Nova Scotia were arrested but never charged in Cape Spear, Newfoundland. The purpose of the visit was to set up a Bacchus chapter in Newfoundland. In January 2011, the Easton Crew based in Grand Falls "patched over" to become the first Bacchus chapter in Newfoundland. The choice of Grands Falls was not an accident as members of the mainland chapters had several friends and relatives in the area. St. John's and Corner Brook are policed by the Royal Newfoundland Constabulary made of native Newfoundlanders who served at same stations for the duration of their careers while Grand Falls is policed by the Royal Canadian Mounted Police detachment made up of officers from all over Canada who served only a few years in Grand Falls. Outlaw bikers in Newfoundland regard the Mounties as the easiest police force to avoid as they are less likely to use illegal tactics such as entrapment compared to the Constabulary. The highways that link Grand Falls to St. John's and Corner Brook allowed Bacchus to have access to those cities while avoiding the Royal Newfoundland Constabulary.

In early 2011, Bacchus set up a chapter in Fredericton.

On 8 November 2014, Bacchus MC patched over their closest ally, the Original Red Devils Motorcycle Club, to create the first Ontario expansion of the club absorbing the Red Devils three Ontario chapters in Hamilton, Chatham-Kent and Sudbury. Bacchus switched the bottom rocker on their jackets from "Ontario" to "Canada," likely to avoid conflict with the Hells Angels who claim the exclusive right to have a province written on their backs. The club manages close relationships with other well-established Canadian motorcycle clubs like Para-dice Riders MC, Vagabonds MC, Highlanders MC, and the Charlottetown Harley Club.

== Insignia ==
The Bacchus Motorcycle Club wears a three-piece patch on their vest with the club's name on the top, the club logo in the centre and the province they represent on the bottom. The Bacchus club colors, black and gold, are reflected in their club motto: "Black and Gold will never fold". Prior to 2014, all Bacchus MC and Original Red Devils Motorcycle Club members also sport a brotherhood patch depicting the lasting 1% bond between the two clubs which was absolved after the patch over.

== Membership and organization ==
Members of the Bacchus MC must own a Harley-Davidson motorcycle. The club's membership is estimated at two hundred, with seventeen chapters located in five provinces, making it as of 2022 the third largest motorcycle club in Canada.

== Chapter list ==
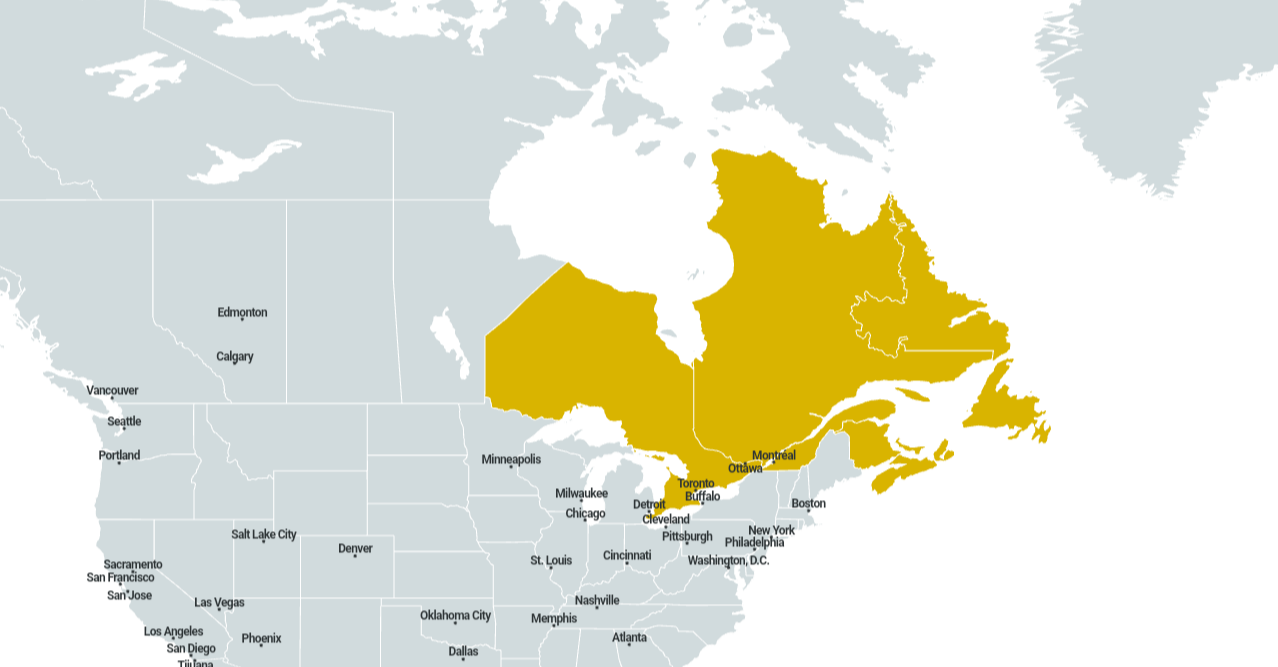
Bacchus Motorcycle Club Map

  - Chapters (17 total in Canada)
- New Brunswick
  - Albert County (Mother chapter)
  - York County
  - Saint John
  - Charlotte County
- Newfoundland
  - Grand Falls Windsor
  - C.B.S (Conception Bay South)
- Nova Scotia
  - Halifax
  - Colchester
  - Hants County (Frozen)
  - Route 333 (Frozen)
- Ontario
  - Hamilton
  - Chatham
  - Woodstock
  - Halton Hills
  - Muskoka
  - Haldimand
  - Grey County
- Prince Edward Island
  - Kings County
  - Prince County
- Bacchus support clubs
  - Valhellions MC

== Criminal allegations and incidents ==
Bacchus MC
- Founded: August 1972; 54 years ago
- Founding location: Albert County, New Brunswick, Canada
- Years active: 1972–present
- Territory: 14 chapters in 5 Canadian provinces
- Membership (est.): 200
- Activities: Individuals have been convicted of the following: Drug trafficking, assault, extortion, and intimidation
- Allies: Hells Angels MC
- Rivals: No rivals

Bacchus member Derreck Dean Huggan was charged with possession of drugs and a restricted weapon after police seized approximately $85,000 worth of crack cocaine, marijuana and hashish, as well as $1,600 in cash and a loaded handgun during a raid on a home in Lunenburg County, Nova Scotia on 14 April 2000.

Police again began surveillance on Huggan after a shop he owned and managed was raided in Charlottetown in May 2006. He was arrested in November 2006 as part of a police operation that involved arrests in Charlottetown and Halifax, Nova Scotia. He was convicted on several counts of conspiracy to traffic cocaine, hashish, ecstasy and hydromorphone, and was sentenced to six-and-a-half years in prison in July 2007.

Bacchus member James Russell "Rustie" Hall and his wife Giovanna "Ellen" Hall were murdered in their Barr Settlement, Nova Scotia home on 26 February 2010. The Royal Canadian Mounted Police (RCMP) stated that the deaths may be linked to organized crime.

Matthew Thomas Foley, president of Bacchus' Saint John, New Brunswick chapter, was convicted of manslaughter over the death of Michael Thomas Schimpf, who was shot and killed near the club house on 14 July 2012. On 18 April 2011, a Bacchus member was arrested in Amherst, Nova Scotia by the Royal Canadian Mounted Police after the police discovered marihuana and cocaine in his car. In October 2011, the police raided the clubhouse of the Bacchus chapter in Saint John on suspicion of operating an illegal bar which were unfounded and everything the house had to be returned to its members. The police called the fire department, which condemned the building for its numerous violations of the fire code. On 14 July 2012 at a farewell party to their old clubhouse, Michael Thomas Schimpf, approached the chapter president, Matthew Foley. A video camera showed that Foley pulled out his hand gun and walked off-screen with Schimpf. Foley returned alone while Schmpif's body was with a bullet though his heart was found later that day. Foley admitted that he killed Schimpf, but stated it was in self-defense after several attempts were made to prevent Schimpf from harassing Foley. Foley made a plea bargain with the Crown where the charges of first-degree murder were dropped in exchange for him pledging guilty to manslaughter. Schimpf was a convicted drug dealer who in the days before the murder had thrown bricks though the window of a tattoo shop owned by Foley. On 29 September 2012, two Bacchus members were accused of beating to death Walter Wheeler at Fredericton's 20/Twenty Club but were not charged as witnesses description of the event showed it was Wheeler who initiated an attack on one of the individuals. Foley was sentenced to ten years in prison and banned from owning firearms for life in August 2012.

Bacchus members Patrick Michael James, Duayne Jamie Howe and David John Pearce were convicted of extortion and intimidation in July 2018, charged stemming from incidents in 2012 when a man attempted to start a chapter of a non-criminal motorcycle club in Nova Scotia. When Bacchus sergeant-at-arms James discovered the victim's plans to start the chapter, club members threatened him until he ceased the endeavor and he and his wife sold their motorcycles. In November 2018, James was sentenced to three years' imprisonment, Howe to two years' and Pearce to eighteen months'. The case also led a Nova Scotia judge to designate the Bacchus Motorcycle Club a criminal organization in Nova Scotia under the Criminal Code, the first time the designation had been used in the province.

In March 2013, Bacchus member David James Bishop was charged with a number of crimes, including trafficking cocaine and steroids, relating to a drug smuggling ring at Central Nova Scotia Correctional Facility. He pleaded guilty in April 2013 and was sentenced to two-and-a-half years in prison.

Bishop was one of four men charged in connection with the beating of a man who was left with permanent brain damage. Police allege the victim was assaulted inside a former motorcycle gang clubhouse in New Glasgow, Nova Scotia before he was driven on to Cape Breton Island and abandoned along the side of Highway 105 at Glendale, Nova Scotia on 6 or 7 June 2016. The club is designated a criminal organization in Nova Scotia under the Criminal Code.

== Books ==
- Langton, Jerry (2015). Cold War – How Organized Crime Works in Canada and Why It's About to Get More Violent. Toronto: HarperColllins. ISBN 978-1-4434-3255-9.

== See also ==
- List of outlaw motorcycle clubs
- Gangs in Canada
