= Red Devils Motorcycle Club =

Outlaw motorcycle supporter club of the Hells Angels MC

Red Devils MC
- Abbreviation: RDMC
- Founded: 2001; 25 years ago
- Founded at: Karlstad, Sweden
- Type: Outlaw motorcycle club
- Purpose: Support club to the Hells Angels
- Region served: Worldwide (chapters in 19 countries)

The Red Devils Motorcycle Club (RDMC) is an international 1% outlaw motorcycle club and the principal support club of the Hells Angels. The club is not to be confused with the now-defunct Original Red Devils Motorcycle Club that was founded in Canada in the late 1940s. This club patched over to the East Coast based Bacchus in 2015.

With chapters in nearly 20 countries, the Red Devils MC is considered the most elite group that works for the Hells Angels, often seen as the most violent faction of their support groups. It is described as a "shock troop", and their work is to protect the Hells Angels from rival gangs, protect the drug and gun trafficking networks and doing the "dirty work" (murders, kidnapings, shootings etc.) for the Hells Angels. Not all factions around the world have been involved in such crimes but they have been involved in numerous disputes with law enforcement and rival one-percenter motorcycle clubs all around the world. The nickname for the Red Devils in the biker scene is the "Death Patrol" due to their extreme violence .

== Formation ==
The Red Devils MC were initially founded in Karlstad, Sweden in 2001. A charter emerged the following year in the United States in Massachusetts. The Red Devils charter would then go on to be established in Belgium in 2003, and later, expand into other countries.

== Criminal allegations and incidents ==
=== Australia ===
A shooting attack on Red Devils MC member Daniel Pegoraro occurred in 2013. Pegoraro sustained injuries but survived the attack. It is speculated that the ambush had to do with an ongoing dispute between the Hells Angels and the Bandidos Motorcycle Club.

The Melbourne chapter Red Devils clubhouse was raided by police in 2015 after a number of bullets were fired at their Clayton South clubhouse. Members of the motorcycle club ended up being charged with liquor licensing breaches and firearms offenses.

=== Canada ===
The Red Devils Motorcycle Club currently has 18 charters in Canada. As part of an investigation into outlaw motorcycle club activities in New Brunswick, Canada, two members of the Red Devils MC - along with two Hells Angels members - were arrested in April 2020 by the Royal Canadian Mounted Police in relation to organized crime, drugs and money laundering.

Matthew Quattrociocchi, a member of the Red Devils MC Hamilton Charter, was charged with assault and possession of a weapon in June 2020 after he had beat a member of the rival Outlaws Motorcycle Club with a baseball bat in broad daylight near a St. Catharines convenience store in the Niagara region. The incident was caught on video via security camera footage.

=== United States ===
Larry 'Ronnie' Capps Jr. - the Cape Fear Charter President of the Red Devils Motorcycle Club in North Carolina was arrested on drug and weapons charges in 2010 following a raid of the charter clubhouse where authorities seized 50 firearms, more than $3,000, and an ounce of cocaine worth about $1,200. Capps was charged with six counts of trafficking cocaine, five counts of manufacturing cocaine, and one count of possession of a weapon of mass destruction for a sawed-off double-barrel shotgun.

In June 2012, nineteen members and Hells Angels associates, some of which were members of the Red Devils Motorcycle Club, were arrested in a law enforcement sting operation for drug and prostitution charges.

Multiple Massachusetts Hells Angels and Red Devils bikers were arrested in March 2013 during raids at their hangouts in Lynn and Byfield on charges of kidnapping, mayhem, and extortion.

On March 19, 2022, Red Devils and Hells Angels bikers were involved in a gun battle with members of the Infamous Ryders and La Familia motorcycle clubs outside the Baymont Ramada hotel in Fayetteville, North Carolina. Three people – William Franklin Davis Sr., Keith Allan Dickey, and Donald Dillenbeck – were shot dead, and another three were wounded by gunfire.
