= Gate Keepers Motorcycle Club =

Canadian outlaw motorcycle club

- Emblem of the Gate Keepers
- Founded: 2013; 13 years ago
- Founding location: Musquodoboit Harbour, Nova Scotia, Canada
- Years active: 2013–present
- Territory: chapters in Ontario
- Membership (est.): 10–20 Ontario; 100+(at peak)
- Criminal activities: Assault
- Allies: Hells Angels; Red Devils Motorcycle Club

The Gate Keepers Motorcycle Club is a Canadian outlaw motorcycle club founded in Musquodoboit Harbour, Nova Scotia, Canada in 2013. It operates as a support club for the Hells Angels in Canada and has chapters in Ontario and formerly in Nova Scotia.

== History ==
The Gate Keepers Mother chapter opened in Musquodoboit Harbour, Nova Scotia in February 2013 and had around 18 to 20 members. It was given a blessing to use red and white as its colors and was sponsored by the London (Ontario) chapter of the Hells Angels. This gave it the recognition of a support club, where members of the Gate Keepers would get a chance at gaining membership into the Hells Angels Motorcycle Club. The second chapter came into existence four months later when Bridgewater, Nova Scotia's Darksiders MC chapter patched over to become Gate Keepers, with nine members. A New Glasgow Gate Keepers chapter started with nine members that April, a chapter in London, Ontario followed later that year. By 2015 they had set chapters in Cape Breton and North Sydney giving them 6 chapters in Nova Scotia.

This rapid expansion alarmed Bacchus Motorcycle Club another Canadian club that has long considered eastern Canada its territory, Bacchus MC had one clubhouse in Nova Scotia at the time and formerly had more, they decided to set up another chapter in Harrietsfield, Nova Scotia. The Gatekeepers countered by opening the Mainland chapter in Halifax, Nova Scotia, Stephen Schneider an associate professor in sociology and criminology at Saint Mary's University stated:

"The relationship between the Bacchus and the Gate Keepers is complicated. While they're both competing to be the dominant biker club in the province, the Bacchus have been aligned with the Hells Angels in the past, and there is no indication of direct conflict between the two clubs."

During this period The Gatekeepers Motorcycle Club would expand in Ontario and open up chapters in Elgin County and Perth County. In 2016 a gathering was held at the Gate Keepers mother chapter clubhouse, some support club members were patched over to hang-arounds for the HAMC, which is a step towards becoming a full-fledged Hells Angel. Police state "there were about 15 given the status of a hang-around. These are people who were Gate Keepers or Darksiders."

In July 2017, the Gate Keepers Pictou County chapter was raided by Nova Scotia Police due to a Liquor Control Act search, this resulted in the arrest of several members of the Gate Keepers MC, the remaining members would transfer to other chapters. In late 2017, the Gate Keepers MC downsized its number of clubhouses, four of its seven clubhouses in Nova Scotia were closed. It is not increased police activity or friction with a rival club, but rather to do with the finances of maintaining and operating the large properties. The members from these chapters would join the three remaining in the province (Eastern Shore, Mainland, South Shore), around this time authorities estimated the group to be over a hundred full-patch members. This was a similar scenario to when the Gate Keepers Cape Breton chapter closed many of their members joined the Pictou County chapter.

In 2018 the Red Devils Motorcycle Club, an International support club of the Hells Angels began to expand out east and established chapters in Moncton, New Brunswick, and in Halifax. With the Halifax chapter of the Red Devils recruiting from the Darksiders Motorcycle Club and the Gate Keepers MC. This is part of a serious push by the Hells Angels to reconsolidate its position in the province through its support clubs.

== Chapter list ==
- Country-wide (14 total)
  - Gate Keepers MC Nomads (Frozen)
- Ontario
  - Middlesex County chapter (London)
  - Forest City chapter (London)
  - Perth County chapter (Stratford)
  - Elgin County chapter
  - Woodstock chapter
- Nova Scotia
  - Eastern Shore chapter (Mother chapter, Musquodoboit Harbour) (Frozen)
  - South Shore chapter (Frozen)
  - Mainland chapter (Frozen)
  - Kings County chapter (Frozen)
  - Pictou County chapter (Frozen)
  - North Sydney chapter (Frozen)
  - Annapolis Royal chapter (Frozen)
  - Cape Breton chapter (Frozen)

== Criminal allegations and incidents ==
On September 6, 2015. A full-patch member of the Gate Keepers MC Middlesex County chapter (London Ontario), Steven Sinclair was fatally shot outside of a bar & grill on Hamilton Road, the establishment was frequented by the Gate Keepers and the Hells Angels. The shooting was committed by a low-level narcotics dealer from Hamilton, Ontario who was hired by an unknown individual to "leg warmer"(the act of shooting someone in their legs) Sinclair for $10,000 to fund his narcotics operation. The man would tell him “There was this guy who ripped me off and disrespected me. I have to show him he can’t do that.” It would all go wrong however when Sinclair was mistakenly shot and killed. With the deal falling apart and the shooter testifying. Hundreds of Hells Angels, Gate Keepers and several other support clubs arrived in London to show their support at Sinclair's funeral.

In 2016, four members of the Gate Keepers Motorcycle Club were charged with the assault of another biker(this occurred after provocation from the individual), they beat him and then removed his cut. He was left in a pickup truck along the side of a highway in Cape Breton. The trial is still ongoing as of 2021.

In July 2017, the Gate Keepers Pictou County chapter was raided by Nova Scotia Police for a Liquor Control Act search, this saw in the arrest of several members of the Gate Keepers MC, the seizure of large amounts of alcohol, and cash.

On July 17, 2021. The Gate Keepers MC along with the Hells Angels and several other motorcycle clubs met with over a thousand other people, they all gathered outside of EMDC Prison in London, Ontario to protest the death of an inmate related to an alleged member of the Hells Angels. Nineteen inmate deaths have occurred in the prison since 2009, this protest saw the biggest turnout so far.
