= Jimmy Cournoyer =

Canadian convicted drug trafficker

- Born: October 1979 (age 46–47); Laval, Quebec, Canada
- Occupation: Drug trafficker and supplier
- Convictions: Drug trafficking and smuggling
- Penalty: 27 years' imprisonment

Jimmy Cournoyer (born October 1979), sometimes called the Pot Playboy or the King of Pot, is a convicted Canadian drug trafficker and prior to being arrested, the biggest supplier of marijuana to New York and the U.S. East Coast. He was known for his lavish lifestyle, which included dating a lingerie model and partying.

Originally from Laval, Quebec, Cournoyer was first arrested in 1998 with a few marijuana plants in his Laval apartment. Over several spells in prison, Cournoyer built up a criminal network that grew into a multibillion-dollar international drug trafficking empire that involved the Hells Angels, the Sinaloa Cartel, Native American smugglers, and the Rizzuto and Bonanno crime families. The DEA got a lead on his organization after information provided by a disgruntled girlfriend led to the arrest of Cournoyer and Bonanno associate John Venizelos in 2012.

In 2012, Cournoyer was arrested as he tried to enter Mexico. In May 2013, Cournoyer pleaded guilty to two charges: money laundering and conspiracies to manufacture and distribute cocaine and marijuana. He was sentenced to 27 years' imprisonment. His friend and former UFC champion Georges St-Pierre wrote a letter asking the judge for clemency. St-Pierre would later apologize to his fans, calling his signing of the letter a 'mistake'.
