= London Police Service =

Canadian law enforcement agency

- Badge of the LPS

- Patch of the LPS
- Motto: Facta Non Verba; Deeds not Words

Agency overview
- Formed: February 1855
- Annual budget: $117.84 million (2021)

Jurisdictional structure
- Operations jurisdiction: London, Ontario, Canada
- Legal jurisdiction: Ontario
- General nature: Local civilian police

Operational structure
- Headquarters: 601 Dundas Street London, Ontario; 42.9887°N 81.2318°W
- Sworn members: 617
- Unsworn members: 227
- Elected officer responsible: Michael Kerzner, Solicitor General
- Agency executive: Thai Truong, Chief of Police
- Divisions: List: Corporate services division; Support services division; Criminal investigation division; Uniformed division

Website
- www.londonpolice.ca

The London Police Service (LPS), or simply London Police, is the municipal law enforcement agency in London, Ontario, Canada.

The LPS enforces federal statutes including the Criminal Code, provincial offences such as the Highway Traffic Act, as well as local municipal by-laws. Policing in Ontario is governed by the Police Services Act, which grants officers province-wide jurisdiction, though services only operate within their mandated geographical area.

== History ==
The London Police Force was established in 1855 and was originally headquartered on Richmond Street, overlooking the Covent Garden Market. At its inception, the force had eight sworn officers.

Constables in London were first authorized to carry firearms in 1878, though this practice was only allowed during night shifts.

The London Police Force was renamed as the London Police Service in 1991, stylistically marking the agency's focus on serving the public.

From 2016 to 2020, the London Police Service hired an additional 51 staff, marking the city of London's rapid population growth, though the service has the fewest number of police officers per capita in Southwestern Ontario.

== Management ==
=== Executive Officers ===
The current Chief of Police and senior executive is Thai Truong. He is supported by two deputy chiefs: Trish McIntyre, in charge of operations, and Paul Bastien, in charge of administration.

=== London Police Services Board ===
The service is governed by a seven-member civilian police board. The current board chair is Dr. Javeed Sukhera, a physician and academic.

== Organization ==
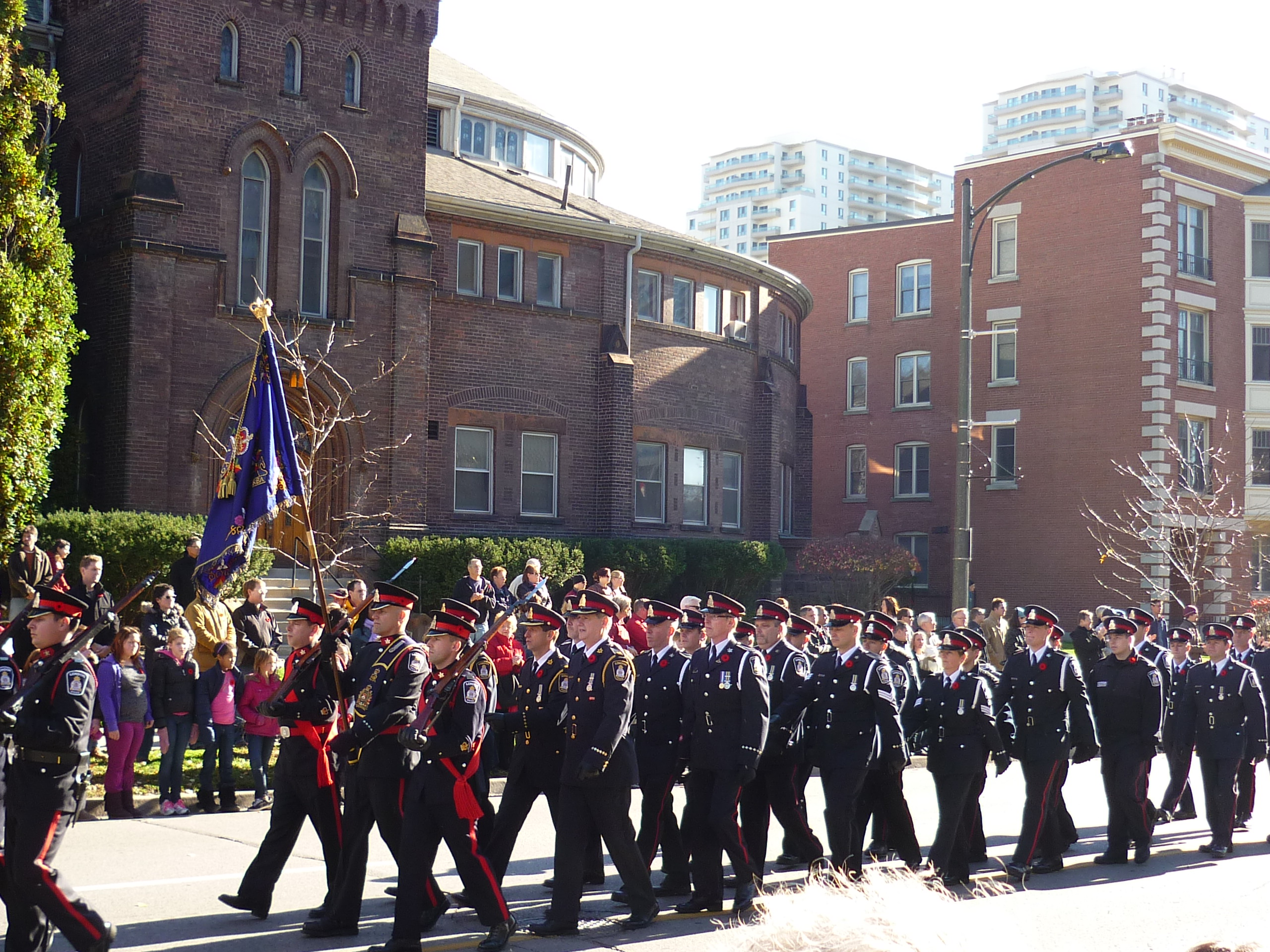
Members of the LPS during the London 2010 Remembrance Day parade

The London Police Service is organized into divisions, branches, sections, and units. These are specialized teams tasked with various goals and help ensure the service operates effectively.

=== Operations ===
==== Uniformed Division ====
- Patrol Operations Branch
  - One Patrol Section
  - Two Patrol Section
  - Three Patrol Section
  - Four Patrol Section
  - Community Foot Patrol Unit
- Patrol Support Branch
  - Operational Support Section
  - Emergency Support Section
  - Community Support Section
  - Community Policing Section

==== Criminal Investigation Division ====
- Support Branch
  - Organized Crime Section
  - Investigative Support Section
- Investigations Branch
  - Forensic Identification Section
    - Explosive Disposal Unit (EDU)
    - Remotely Piloted Aircraft System (RPAS)
  - Sexual Assault/Child Abuse Section
  - General Investigation Section
  - Major Crime Section
  - Guns and Drugs Section

=== Administration ===
==== Support Services Division ====
- Administrative Support Branch
  - Custody, Documents and Property Section
  - Court and Offender Management Section
  - Communications Section
- Information Technology Branch
  - Support Services
  - Infrastructure and Core Application Services
  - Radio Services

==== Corporate Services Division ====
- Human Resources Branch
  - Specialists and Coordinators
  - Recruiting and Training Section
- Corporate Support and Continuous Improvement Branch
- Psychological Services

==== Facilities, Finance and Fleet Division ====
- Facilities Services
- Financial Services
- Fleet Services

== Fleet ==
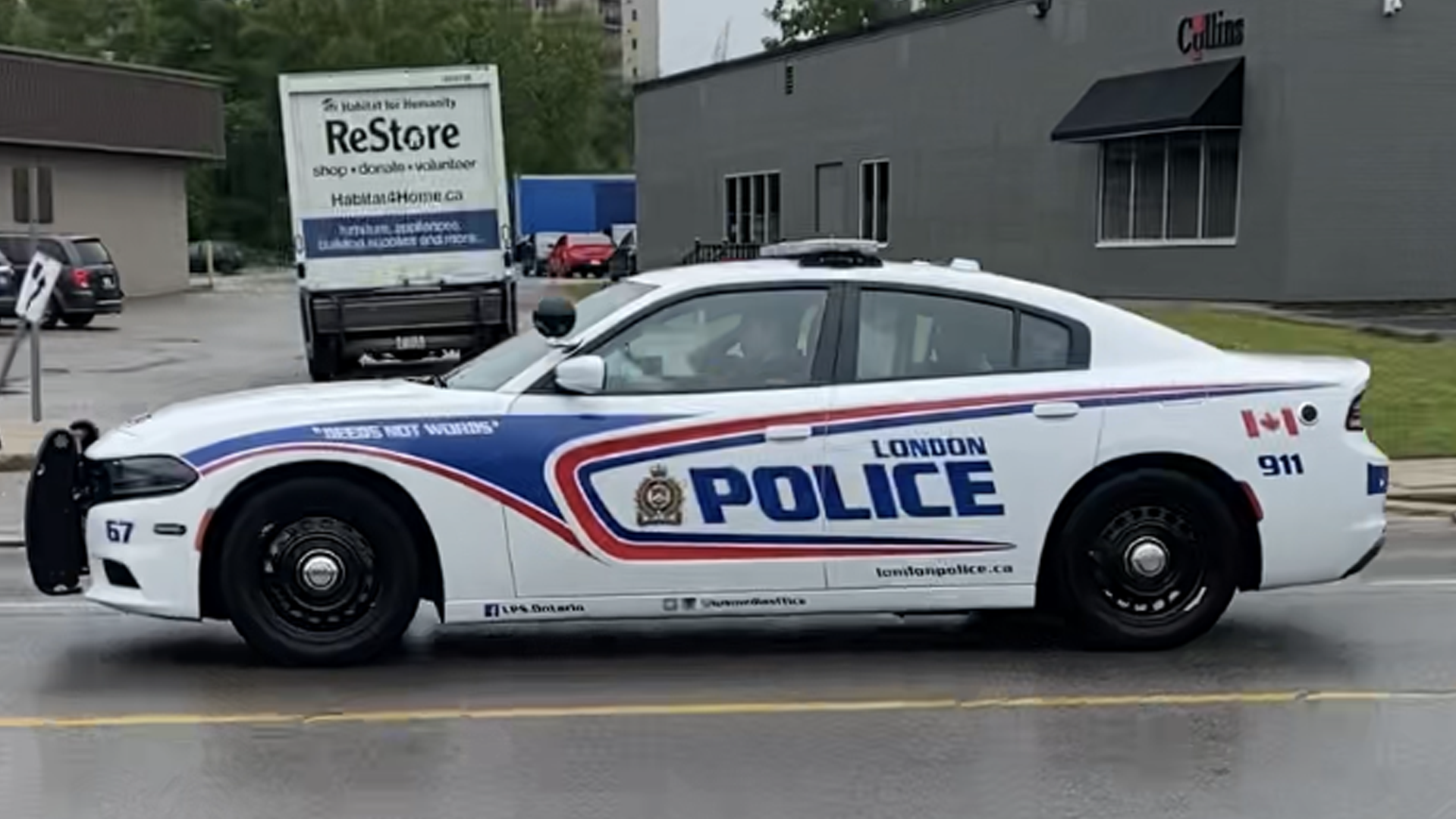
A London Police Dodge Charger Pursuit on Adelaide Street South in July 2021

The London Police Service has a large fleet of vehicles at its disposal, whether for patrol, canine, emergency response, or other police duties. Unlike larger municipalities in Ontario, specifically in the Greater Toronto Area (GTA), London does not have a dedicated police helicopter, although the Ontario Provincial Police employs two such aircraft for search and rescue missions, pursuits and other miscellaneous air operations.

The service primarily operated the Ford Crown Victoria Police Interceptor from 1992 to the late 2010s in both marked and unmarked capacities. The first 21 production Crown Victorias were delivered to the London Police Service in early 1992, and the last Crown Victoria commissioned for use by the LPS was placed on patrol in 2017. While a small number of Crown Victoria sedans are still used by London police, these are bound to retire in the near future. This is because the LPS uses its police cars rigorously and decommissions vehicles once they reach a certain number of kilometers. Replacing the Crown Victoria have primarily been Dodge Chargers, while older SUVs have been replaced either by Ford Police Interceptor Utility or Chevrolet Tahoe PPV cruisers.

In addition to its patrol fleet, the LPS employs various vehicles for special operations. The Marine Unit has a Zodiac Hurricane boat,

The Emergency Response Unit formerly used light armoured vehicles an RG-12 (sold to the Stratford Police Service) and a RG-31 donated by General Dynamics Land Systems for high-risk situations they replaced the 2 ageing vehicles in 2020 with a Terradyne Armored Vehicles Gurkha with plans to buy a second .

The service's Traffic Management Unit also uses a few pickup trucks, including a Chevrolet Silverado and Dodge RAM 1500.

Throughout its history, the LPS has used various paint schemes on its fleet, the most recent being a modern blue and red swoosh-type design on a plain white background, which was introduced in 2012 under former Chief Bradley Duncan.

From 2018 onward, the service has equipped some of its vehicles with the StarChase GPS system, which shoots a compact suction-based tracker towards a pursued vehicle; the goal being to trace the vehicle and minimize pursuits, which can pose a severe danger to motorists and pedestrians.
