= Hells Angels MC criminal allegations and incidents in the United States =

A National Drug Intelligence Center report on the Hells Angels

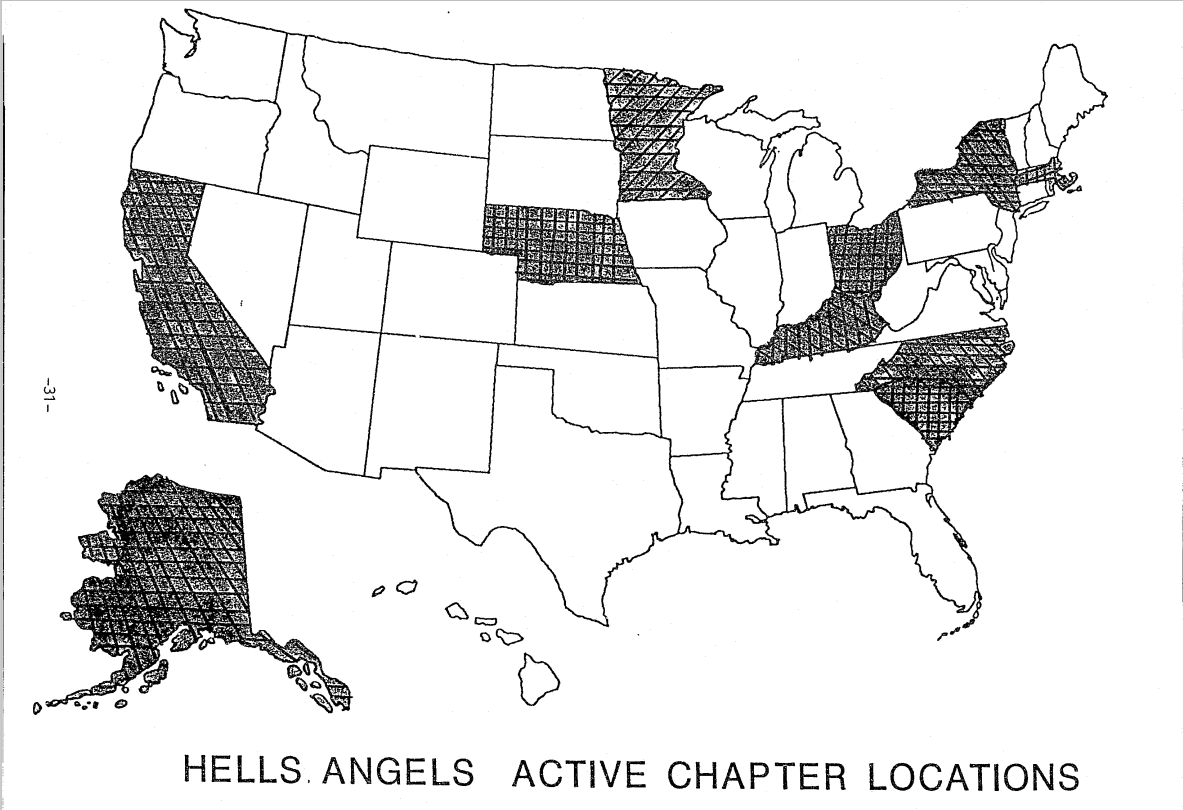
A map showing locations of HAMC chapters in the United States c. 1991

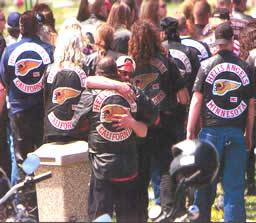
Hells Angels members from various U.S. states at a gathering

The Hells Angels Motorcycle Club (HAMC) is designated an outlaw motorcycle gang by the Department of Justice. Based primarily in the Southwest, the Pacific Northwest, the Great Lakes region, the Mid-Atlantic and New England, there are an estimated 92 Hells Angels chapters in 27 U.S. states, with a membership of over 800. Due to the club's designation as a "known criminal organization" by the State Department and Department of Homeland Security, the United States has a federal policy prohibiting its foreign members from entering the country. The Hells Angels partake in drug trafficking, gunrunning, extortion, money laundering, insurance fraud, kidnapping, robbery, theft, counterfeiting, contraband smuggling, loan sharking, forced prostitution/"pimping " trafficking in stolen goods, motorcycle and motorcycle parts theft, assault, murder, bombings, arson, intimidation and contract killing. The club's role in the narcotics trade involves the production, transportation and distribution of marijuana and methamphetamine, in addition to the transportation and distribution of cocaine, hashish, heroin, LSD, MDMA, PCP and diverted pharmaceuticals. According to the Federal Bureau of Investigation (FBI), the HAMC may earn up to $1 billion in drug sales annually.

The Hells Angels are allied with numerous smaller motorcycle gangs – such as the Devils Diciples, the Diablos, El Forastero, the Galloping Goose, the Hessians, the Iron Horsemen, the Red Devils, the Sons of Silence, and the Warlocks – and have associated in criminal ventures with the Buffalo, Cleveland, Gambino, Genovese, Los Angeles, Patriarca, and San Jose crime families, as well as the Aryan Brotherhood, the Mexican Mafia, and the Nazi Lowriders. Rival motorcycle gangs include the Bandidos, the Breed, the Mongols, the Outlaws, the Pagans, the Sons of Satan, and the Vagos.

== Alaska ==
HAMC chapters were established in Anchorage and Fairbanks in December 1982 following a merger with the Brothers MC. The Brothers were formed in 1967, and established an association with the Hells Angels in California's San Francisco Bay Area by 1977. The club "patched over" to the HAMC during a ceremony in California attended by members of the Brothers' Fairbanks chapter. The Alaskan Hells Angels are involved in methamphetamine trafficking.

=== Operation Cacus ===
Anchorage Hells Angels chapter sergeant-at-arms Anthony "Tony Truth" Tait volunteered to become a paid informant for the Federal Bureau of Investigation (FBI) in 1985, and he provided the government with detailed information on the club's organization and criminal activities – such as drugs and explosives trafficking – for two years. During this period, Tait travelled the country at government expense to meet with various Hells Angels members, and he covertly recorded some of these meetings by wearing a wire. As part of the investigation, the informant and undercover agents purchased approximately $1.6 million of cocaine and methamphetamine from the Hells Angels, in addition to more than twenty pounds of explosives, three automatic weapons and two silencers. The Organized Crime Drug Enforcement Task Force (OCDETF) Operation CACUS culminated with 38 HAMC members in Alaska and four other states being arrested on narcotics, weapons, explosives and conspiracy charges on November 10, 1987. Anchorage chapter president Edward Floyd Hubert and Fairbanks chapter president Dennis E. Pailing were among fourteen people taken into custody during raids by FBI and Bureau of Alcohol, Tobacco, Firearms and Explosives (ATF) agents on homes in Anchorage and a compound in Fairbanks.

Ten Hells Angels from California and Alaska, including Hubert and Pailing, were extradited to Louisville, Kentucky to face charges of conspiring to transport firearms and explosives across state lines in order to kill members of the Outlaws in retaliation for the death of John Cleave Webb, the previous Anchorage Hells Angels president who was fatally shot by two Outlaws outside a saloon in Jefferson County, Kentucky on August 12, 1986. On October 28, 1988, Anchorage chapter members Hubert, Lawrence Russell Hagel and Gerald G. Protzman were convicted of the misdemeanor charge of converting a government intelligence manual for their use, while Pailing and four other Alaskan Angels were acquitted. Other members of the Alaska and California chapters were convicted on state drug and firearm charges either side of the federal trial. The Hells Angels allegedly put a $1 million bounty on Tait's life.

=== Federal racketeering case ===
Four Alaskan Hells Angels – Montgomery David Elliott, Michael Hurn, Dale Leedom and William Spearman – were arrested by ATF agents on federal racketeering and firearms charges during raids at three homes in Anchorage and one in Two Rivers on December 3, 2003. HAMC clubhouses in Anchorage and North Pole were also searched. The charges, filed at the U.S. District Court for the District of Nevada, stemmed from the River Run riot – a conflict between the Hells Angels and the Mongols on April 27, 2002, which left three bikers dead in Laughlin, Nevada – and followed a twenty-month ATF investigation of the club. The operation resulted in the arrests of a total of fifty-eight Hells Angels members and associates by federal, state and local law enforcement agencies in Alaska and four other Western states for narcotics trafficking, firearms violations, possessing stolen explosives and various other crimes. Leedom, the Fairbanks chapter president, was one of six Hells Angels convicted in the case after being extradited to Las Vegas, Nevada to face charges; he pleaded no contest to committing a violent crime in the aid of racketeering in October 2006 and was sentenced to two years in prison on February 13, 2007. Thirty-six others had charges against them dismissed.

=== Violent incidents ===
Hells Angels member James William Leffel was convicted of first-degree assault for stabbing a man named Jens Schurig in the thigh, opening his femoral artery, outside a bar in Anchorage after Schurig allegedly denigrated Leffel's motorcycle.

On August 3, 2017, Michael "Steak Knife" Staton was kidnapped and taken to a duplex in Wasilla where he was tortured, beaten and killed by members of the 1488s – a white supremacist prison gang to which he belonged – after he was accused of stealing drugs and "colors" from Craig "Oakie" King, a Hells Angels member and 1488s associate. King and five 1488s members were arrested on March 27, 2019, and charged with murder, kidnapping and racketeering crimes including drug trafficking. On May 2, 2022, King was convicted of racketeering conspiracy, conspiracy in aid of racketeering, murder in aid of racketeering, kidnapping resulting in death, and kidnapping conspiracy. King and four others were sentenced to life in prison without the possibility of parole in January 2023.

=== Methamphetamine trafficking ===
Hells Angels member Charles Denver "Pup" Phillips and his wife Lois Latrilla Phillips were arrested after an FBI drug task force discovered twelve pounds of methamphetamine and almost $25,000 in cash at their apartment and in a nearby shipping container in Anchorage on August 10, 2018. Investigators also found a ledger listing money and quantities, and a list of names of Hells Angels prospects throughout the state. The couple were convicted of distributing and conspiring to distribute methamphetamine. On October 30, 2019, Charles Phillips was sentenced to eighteen years in federal prison, and his wife was sentenced to five years.

== Arizona ==
The HAMC has approximately a hundred members in Arizona and is classified as a criminal street gang by the Arizona Department of Public Safety (AZDPS). The Arizona Hells Angels produce methamphetamine – independently and in conjunction with Mexican drug cartels – and also distribute the drug at retail level. The HAMC's predecessor in the state, the Dirty Dozen, voted to merge with the Hells Angels in 1996 and officially "patched over" during a meeting in Oakland, California in October 1997. With the merger of the Dirty Dozen, the Hells Angels established six Arizona chapters, in Phoenix, Mesa, Tucson, Cave Creek and Flagstaff, as well as a Nomads chapter.

=== Methamphetamine trafficking ===
In June 2001, Greg "Snake" Surdukan and Chris "Porker" Baucum, president and vice-president of the Hells Angels' nomads chapter in Arizona, were arrested and charged with narcotics trafficking after the Drug Enforcement Administration (DEA) uncovered an international drug network involving the smuggling of methamphetamine into the United States from South Africa. The smuggling ring was allegedly established in November 1999 and involved South African Hells Angels members speed mailing methamphetamine hidden inside stuffed toys to their American counterparts in Flagstaff, from where it was distributed to other U.S. states. On June 17, 2002, Surdukan and Baucum pleaded guilty to drug trafficking; Surdukan was sentenced to fifteen years' imprisonment.

=== Operation Black Biscuit ===
The Bureau of Alcohol, Tobacco, Firearms and Explosives (ATF) initiated an undercover investigation into the Arizona Hells Angels in September 2001 when Rudolph "Rudy" Kramer – a member of the Solo Angeles, a club based in Tijuana, Mexico with a small presence in southern California – agreed to become an informant and infiltrate other motorcycle gangs in exchange for the dismissal of charges against him after he was arrested by ATF agents for weapons violations. The investigation, known as Operation Black Biscuit, resulted in a twenty-one month infiltration of the club by a team of ATF agents, technicians and confidential informants. Kramer made contacts throughout the state as a dealer of methamphetamine and firearms, and he began collaborating with the Hells Angels in narcotics and weapons smuggling after fabricating a story that he was arming the Solo Angeles in Mexico to combat a Mongols chapter there. He sought permission from the HAMC to form a Solo Angeles nomads chapter in Arizona, which the ATF used to make contact with the Hells Angels. Kramer began introducing ATF agents posing as Solo Angeles bikers to Hells Angels leaders statewide after a meeting with Mesa chapter president Robert "Bad Bob" Johnston Jr. in July 2002. The drug-addicted Kramer eventually became a liability to the operation, however, and was returned to prison after the firearm indictment against him was reinstated in September 2002. He was sentenced to five years in prison after pleading guilty, and he later entered protective custody. Information on Kramer's role as an informant soon leaked, and Hells Angels leaders in Arizona also began hearing rumors from southern California that the Solo Angeles were imposters. In an effort to ensure credibility, undercover ATF agent Jay Dobyns told the Hells Angels in June 2003 that he and another Solo Angeles biker would be travelling to Sonora to kill Mongols. The ATF then staged the murder of a Mongols member by photographing and videotaping a law enforcement officer posing as the rival biker laying in a shallow grave, splattered with lamb blood and brains. Dobyns had bloodstained Mongols "colors" mailed to the Hells Angels from Mexico, and provided a videotape and pictures of the staged killing. The ruse proved successful and, according to Dobyns and the ATF, he was subsequently voted in as a member of the Hells Angels' Skull Valley chapter. Sonny Barger and the HAMC have vehemently denied that Dobyns was ever awarded membership.

Operation Black Biscuit was ended prematurely because the ATF believed Robert "Chico" Mora, a senior member of the Hells Angels' Phoenix chapter, was plotting to murder the Solo Angeles. Mora did not know the Solo Angeles were undercover agents, but believed they were a potential rival encroaching on the Hells Angels' territory. He allegedly assembled a group of veteran Hells Angels enforcers to liquidate the Solo Angeles. The operation culminated with a series of synchronized raids carried out across Arizona on July 8, 2003, and the arrests of fifty-two people; sixteen Hells Angels members and associates were indicted on charges including RICO Act violations, murder and drug trafficking. Over 500 illegal weapons, including silencers, pipe bombs, sawed-off shotguns and machine guns, along with ammunition, $50,000 in cash and drugs were also seized. During one of the raids, on a HAMC clubhouse in North Phoenix, club prospect Michael Wayne Coffelt was shot and wounded with a rifle by police officer Laura Beeler. He was subsequently charged with aggravated assault against Beeler, who reported that Coffelt fired first and was cleared of any wrongdoing in the shooting by county prosecutors. The charges against Coffelt were dismissed in November 2004 when judge Michael Wilkinson of the Maricopa County Superior Court ruled that the police violated state search-and-seizure laws during the raid. Investigators determined that Coffelt never fired at Beeler. Operation Black Biscuit was deemed a success by the ATF, but internal government disagreement ultimately led to the sixteen defendants escaping conviction on the key charges of racketeering and murder. Half of the defendants plea bargained to lesser offenses, and five others had federal charges dismissed. The plea agreements resulted in no more than five-year prison sentences. In 2004, Mora was convicted of the federal charge of possessing body armor with intent to sell and sentenced to eighteen months in prison. The conviction was overturned the following year after an appeal. The Skull Valley chapter disbanded as a result of the investigation.

=== Murder of Cynthia Garcia ===
On October 27, 2001, full-patch Hells Angels members Kevin J. Augustiniak and Michael Christopher "Mesa Mike" Kramer, and prospective member Paul Merle Eischeid murdered Cynthia Yvonne Garcia, a forty-four-year-old mother of six who verbally disrespected the club and its members while in an intoxicated state during a party at the Hells Angels' clubhouse in Mesa. After beating Garcia unconscious, the three bikers loaded her into the trunk of a car and drove her into the desert near the Salt River where they stabbed her twenty-seven times and attempted to decapitate her. Garcia's body was discovered on October 31. Kramer contacted ATF agent John Ciccone the following month and, without disclosing his crime, offered to become an informant. After moving to Los Angeles, California and infiltrating the club's San Fernando Valley chapter by posing as an Arizona drug runner, Kramer offered the ATF information on Garcia's killing in exchange for immunity from prosecution. Fourteen months after becoming an informant, he signed a plea agreement to serve five years of probation for the murder. Eischeid fled the country following his indictment for the killing in 2007 and was placed on the U.S. Marshals Service (USMS) 15 Most Wanted Fugitives list. He was apprehended in the San Isidro district of Buenos Aires, Argentina on February 3, 2011, after being tracked by the USMS, Diplomatic Security Service (DSS), and Interpol. Eischeid was extradited to Arizona in July 2018 after exhausting all of his appeals in the Argentine legal system. Augustiniak pleaded guilty to second-degree murder in October 2011 and was sentenced to twenty-three years and six months' imprisonment on March 30, 2012.

=== Conflict with the Mongols ===
Joshua William Harber, a member of the Hells Angels chapter in Ventura, California, was shot in the face outside a bar in Cave Creek on June 8, 2002, and died later that day at John C. Lincoln Medical Center in Phoenix. Harber's unidentified killer fled the scene in a car after the shooting. While Phoenix Police Department detectives investigated several motives for the murder, including the possibility of retaliation by the Mongols for the killing of a Mongol by the Hells Angels at the River Run riot in Laughlin, Nevada on April 27, 2002, the crime has become a cold case.

Cave Creek Hells Angels chapter president Daniel Leroy "Hoover" Seybert was shot to death outside a bar in Phoenix on March 22, 2003. The autopsy report showed that Seybert was shot in the head at close range by a small caliber handgun which was located during the investigation in Seybert's back pocket. The homicide has never been solved and there have been various theories regarding the reason for Seybert's killing. It has been speculated that he was killed by the Mongols, by the Hells Angels as part of an internal conflict, or by the ATF in relation to Operation Black Biscuit. Two days after Seybert's death, a Mongols member was stabbed in the back and wounded at a gas station in Reno, Nevada by a suspected Hells Angels member in a possible revenge attack.

Seven Hells Angels – including the Tucson chapter president, the former Mesa chapter president and other leaders – were arrested in Arizona on various charges on December 3, 2003, following a two-year investigation of the club by the ATF. Five of those were indicted at the U.S. District Court for the District of Nevada on federal racketeering and firearms charges stemming from the River Run riot. The raids in Arizona were carried out as part of a coordinated operation which led to the arrests of at least fifty-five Hells Angels members and associates in five Western states by federal, state and local law enforcement agencies. Two Arizona Angels – Rodney Cox and Calvin Schaefer – were among six HAMC members convicted in the case after being extradited to Las Vegas, Nevada to stand trial. Schaefer was sentenced to four years and three months in a federal prison on January 12, 2007, for committing a violent crime in the aid of racketeering. Cox was sentenced to two years' imprisonment on February 23, 2007, after pleading guilty to the same charge. Charges were dismissed against thirty-six others.

Patrick Michael Eberhardt, treasurer of the Hells Angels' Cave Creek chapter, was shot dead and a club hangaround was wounded when a group of six Hells Angels were fired upon while riding their motorcycles in Phoenix on February 7, 2015. Earlier that day, a group of unidentified bikers had fired shots at members of the Mongols nearby. A Mongols member is one of the two suspects in Eberhardt's unsolved murder.

On August 17, 2016, Hells Angels Mesa chapter member Wayne Whitt opened fire outside a sports bar in Tempe, killing one Mongols member – Richard "AZ Slick" Garcia – and wounding another before fleeing on his motorcycle. The shooting followed a verbal altercation between the rival bikers inside the bar. Three surviving Mongols – Frank Gardea, John Magana and Efren Ontiveros – were arrested, although the Tempe Police Department declined to press charges against Whitt as the shooting was deemed self-defense.

=== Conflict with the Vagos ===
Five Hells Angels and two members of the Desert Road Riders – a club founded in Bullhead City in 1993 that became a HAMC support club in 2002 – were arrested on December 2, 2009, by an AZDPS task force as part of Operation Quiet Riot, a six-month investigation into a turf war involving the Hells Angels, Desert Road Riders and Vagos in Mohave County. On April 11, 2012, four Hells Angels members – Stephen Helland, Dale Hormut, Rudolfo "Rudy" Martinez and Gerald Smith – were acquitted of rioting and assisting in a criminal street gang. Another, George "Joby" Walters, took a plea deal and was sentenced to two-and-a-half years in prison. The charges stemmed from an alleged riot involving the rival clubs at a bar in Bullhead City on June 11, 2009.

Members of the Hells Angels were allegedly involved in a shoot-out with Vagos members in Chino Valley on August 21, 2010; over fifty shots were fired and at least five people were wounded, although no life-threatening injuries were reported. After dozens of law enforcement officers arrived at the scene, twenty-seven people were arrested on charges ranging from attempted murder and aggravated assault to participation in a criminal street gang. Charges against seven Hells Angels members – John Bernard, Kevin Christiansen, Kiley Hill, Robert Kittredge, Michael Koepke, Larry Scott, Jr. and Bruce Schweigert – were dismissed in June 2012 after it transpired that Alfred Acevedo, the only direct witness to the confrontation between the gangs immediately before the shooting, was a Vagos hangaround working as an informant for AZDPS detective John Morris, and who had previously tried to infiltrate the Hells Angels and was rebuked.

=== Other incidents ===
Hells Angels member Nathaniel Barton Sample was convicted in September 2009 of aggravated assault and acting for the benefit of a street gang following an incident at a Scottsdale bar on March 28, 2008, in which he and another man, Jose Cano, attacked an unidentified third man who had accidentally bumped into them. The case marked the first time the HAMC had been labelled a gang in the state of Arizona.

Former Tucson Hells Angels chapter president William Gary "Tramp" Potter, who was expelled from the club due to his methamphetamine use and also because he was suspected of being a government informant, was arrested after deputies from the Pima County Sheriff's Department found the body of Randall Scott Pfeil buried in his yard on July 13, 2010. Pfeil was the subject of a missing persons investigation and had been shot twice in the head. Potter pleaded guilty in April 2012 to second-degree murder and two counts of possession of a deadly weapon by a prohibited possessor. On June 4, 2012, he was sentenced to nineteen years in prison.

Hells Angels Yavapai County chapter treasurer Bruce Schweigert, Sr. was sentenced to eight years in prison on August 12, 2014, after being convicted of threatening and intimidating as a criminal street gang member, assault, disorderly conduct and felony misconduct involving weapons, charges stemming from an August 2013 bar fight in Cottonwood.

== California ==
With over 300 members statewide, the Hells Angels are the most significant motorcycle gang in California in terms of membership and criminal activity. The club has a significant role in the manufacture and distribution of methamphetamine, and in other illegal enterprises. The West Coast faction of the HAMC has also been especially active in the infiltration of legitimate businesses, including motorcycle and automobile services, catering operations, bars, restaurants, and antique stores.

== Colorado ==
The Hells Angels initiated their first chapter in Colorado on June 13, 2001, by amalgamating the Brothers Fast Motorcycle Club, a biker gang founded in Denver in 1963. The HAMC inherited local methamphetamine distribution operations from the Brothers Fast, and expanded into Colorado at a time when the Sons of Silence, historically the state's preeminent motorcycle gang, were severely weakened as a result of a federal investigation. The Hells Angels have three chapters in Colorado.

=== Violent incidents ===
On August 5, 1996, two members of the Hells Angels' San Fernando Valley, California chapter – Donald Dinehart and Larry Lajeunesse – were shot and wounded at the Iron Horse Inn in Steamboat Springs, which was hosting the club's annual rally. Dinehart was airlifted to Denver Health Medical Center and underwent surgery for gunshot wounds to the arm, leg and chest, while Lajeunesse was treated at Routt Memorial Hospital after being shot in the hand. A member of the Ventura, California chapter was suspected of the shooting, which police believed was carried out as a punishment for a breach of club rules. HAMC members reportedly blocked police from entering the motel where the incident took place until after evidence had been removed. Over 200 Hells Angels attended the convention, and several beatings and a stabbing at local bars were also attributed to the bikers. By the end of the four-day rally, 160 police officers from 27 agencies had been drafted into Steamboat Springs to assist the 24 officers on duty in the town.

A group of Hells Angels were allegedly involved in a bar fight with other patrons at the Black Nugget Saloon in Carbondale on November 19, 2005. The bikers were reportedly attending a benefit concert featuring several area punk rock bands to raise money to pay the legal fees of a prospective club member when they were provoked by a group of locals, resulting in a brawl. Kevin Hilgeford suffered a broken jaw and two broken ribs, while Kurt Trede, another patron purported to have been injured in the melee, left the bar before an ambulance arrived. Both men declined to press charges. Hilgeford denied being the instigator of the violence and claimed he was the victim of "a jumping".

John Lockhart, a prospective member of the Hells Angels' LaSalle-based Colorado nomads chapter, was charged on June 19, 2017, with two counts of attempted first-degree murder, two counts of vehicular eluding and illegal discharge of a firearm after a series of incidents in Weld County in which a gun was fired at two vehicles, including a police car. In the early hours of June 11, Lockhart shot from his Harley-Davidson motorcycle through the rear window of a sport utility vehicle driven by Faustino Garcia in a road rage incident in Greeley, before also firing at and hitting a pursuing police cruiser near Colorado State Highway 60 in Milliken. He was identified by investigators via surveillance video after being observed speeding in Greeley on June 13. On March 22, 2019, Lockhart was convicted of vehicular eluding, and acquitted of attempted first-degree murder and illegal discharge of a firearm. A mistrial was initially declared on the charge of attempted first-degree murder of a peace officer, although he was subsequently convicted on June 26 in a retrial. On July 30, Lockhart was sentenced to 32 years' imprisonment for attempted murder, to run consecutively with a three-year sentence for the vehicular eluding conviction.

Members of the Hells Angels and the Mongols engaged in a gun battle that started in the parking lot of the Jake's Roadhouse bar and restaurant in Arvada on July 11, 2020, leaving Hells Angels member William "Kelly" Henderson dead from a gunshot wound, and three others injured. Dozens of shots were fired over a four-block area, and the suspects fled the scene before police arrived. Among the wounded was Ryan McPhearson, a member of a band playing in the bar that night who was hospitalized in critical condition with a brain injury after he was hit in the back of the head by an unknown assailant as he attempted to assist an injured man.

=== Lawsuits against the police ===
The Hells Angels' Denver chapter clubhouse, located in the city's Highlands neighborhood, was raided by the Denver Police Department (DPD) on July 31, 2001, and three club members were arrested. One was convicted of disobeying a lawful order, while charges were dismissed against the other two. In July 2002, eleven plaintiffs – ten HAMC members and the owner of the building housing the club's headquarters – filed a federal lawsuit as a result of the warrantless search, alleging that police acted illegally and violated their constitutional rights. The Denver City Council approved a $50,000 settlement in September 2003 with eighteen claimants – the original eleven petitioners in addition to seven other Hells Angels who were detained at a motorcycle swap meet in early 2003. Denver police chief Gerry Whitman also wrote the club a letter of apology.

Hells Angels members Shiloh Frazier and Todd Zahn were arrested for possession of handguns after eight club members were pulled over by police for allegedly speeding while riding their motorcycles in Denver on September 2, 2005. Zahn pleaded guilty to possession of weapon by a previous offender, and charges against Frazier were dismissed. According to a federal lawsuit filed by the group in the U.S. District Court for the District of Colorado on August 31, 2007, alleging an unconstitutional traffic stop and search without probable cause, the bikers were held at gunpoint and handcuffed, while dozens of police officers, including a SWAT team, and a police helicopter arrived at the scene after the officer who made the traffic stop called for reinforcements. On January 24, 2008, the police departments of Denver and adjacent Mountain View settled the lawsuit with a $14,000 payment, with Denver Manager of Safety Al LaCabe and Mountain View police chief Eric Gomez also signing apologies.

HAMC member Anthony Mills filed a federal lawsuit in April 2020 against city of Greeley, the town of LaSalle and the Weld County Sheriff's Office, as well as individual officers from those jurisdictions and from the Kersey and Garden City police departments in response to an April 8, 2018 incident in which LaSalle police officer David Miller joked about shooting Mills in order to get "paid vacation" after he had pulled him over for speeding. In September 2020, five police agencies paid $25,000 to Mills to settle the lawsuit. Miller issued an apology to Mills as part of the settlement, and resigned from the police department.

Denver Hells Angels chapter member Dustin "Dusty" Ullerich filed a federal lawsuit on November 3, 2021, against Jefferson County, the cities of Golden, Aurora and Arvada, and sixteen individual police officers from four departments over injuries he suffered when police executed a no-knock warrant at his home in Golden on November 7, 2019, as part of an operation targeting fourteen bikers in an organized crime case. Ullerich was hospitalized and placed in a medically induced coma after being hit by a projectile when Jefferson County Sheriff's Office deputy Anthony Brown discharged a short-barreled shotgun loaded with lock-breaking ammunition. Brown was cleared of wrongdoing in 2020.

=== Organized crime ===
Twelve people were taken into custody after Bureau of Alcohol, Tobacco, Firearms and Explosives (ATF) agents and police SWAT teams raided nineteen locations in the Denver metropolitan area, Colorado Springs and Weld County, including the Denver Hells Angels chapter clubhouse, two tattoo shops and an automobile business, on November 7, 2019. Dozens of firearms, methamphetamine, cocaine, cash and passports were seized in the raids. Thirteen Hells Angels members and a fourteenth man affiliated with the Destroyers motorcycle gang were ultimately indicted on charges of assault, kidnapping, robbery, motor vehicle theft and chop shop activity in relation to a Denver-based organized crime ring. The five-month investigation into the ring involved eleven state and federal law enforcement agencies, and began in July 2019 after former HAMC member Joshua O'Bryan began offering investigators details on the Denver chapter's alleged involvement with interstate drug trafficking, gunrunning, prostitution and money laundering. O'Bryan allegedly survived an ambush by a group of Hells Angels at a stashhouse in Erie on June 28, 2019, after he was expelled from the club due to suspicions he was cooperating with law enforcement, which emerged when he was arrested on firearms charges following a police raid on his motorcycle shop in Lakewood. In another alleged incident, on July 12, 2019, O'Bryan was beaten and kidnapped before having his club tattoos covered up at a Hells Angels-owned tattoo parlor in Englewood.

One defendant in the case, William "Kelly" Henderson, was killed in a shootout with a rival motorcycle gang on July 11, 2020, before he could stand trial. William "Curly" Whitney received a two-year deferred sentence after pleading guilty to possessing an explosive. Charges were dismissed against Michael Dire.

== Connecticut ==
The first Hells Angels chapter in Connecticut was founded following a "patch over" of the Grateful Dead Motorcycle Club in Bridgeport in 1975. Two other chapters in the state, in Hartford and Middletown, were subsequently established. The Connecticut Hells Angels have been recruited as enforcers and contract killers for Mafia crime families.

=== Violent incidents ===
On February 7, 1975, Bridgeport Police Department patrol officer John McGee issued a member of the Hells Angels' Bridgeport chapter with a citation for speeding on his motorcycle. While driving home at the end of his shift that evening, McGee observed a stalled vehicle and stopped to assist the occupants when he was attacked by three men and beaten with a baseball bat. He suffered major head injuries and was hospitalized in critical condition. A Hells Angels member was convicted of the assault and sentenced to a year in prison, while two others had charges against them dismissed.

Police raided the Bridgeport Hells Angels chapter clubhouse on May 7, 1975, and arrested five members – John J. Miller, Frank Passalaqua, Robert L. Redmond, Nicholas Romano Jr. and Joseph "Crazy Joe" Whelan – on charges of first-degree manslaughter in connection with the death of José Sosa, whom police determined was pulled from his automobile and beaten to death after being involved in a near collision with a vehicle operated by one of the bikers in the early hours of May 2, 1975. Sosa died of multiple head and internal injuries, and his body was found in the back of his parked car by three passing youths the following afternoon. Three other Hells Angels – Jack Forbes, Russell J. Kutzer and Carlos Pini – were later apprehended on the same charges.

Bridgeport Hells Angels members Frank D'Amato and Salvatore Saffioti were killed and another, Donald "Big Red" Meredith, was left wounded in critical condition when they were shot with a .44 Magnum carbine by Donald E. Krosky after they forced their way into a hotel and bar in Sandy Hook, Newtown on July 31, 1975. The three Hells Angels, armed with knives, had been contracted by the building's owner Charles Framularo to evict Krosky, who rented and managed the premises. Krosky, who was associated with the rival Huns Motorcycle Club, was charged with two counts of murder and one count of assault with intent to murder on November 10, 1975; he was freed on a $100,000 bail bond. After receiving several anonymous death threats, Krosky was shot dead with a shotgun when another vehicle pulled up alongside his car while he was stopped at a traffic light in Trumbull on July 20, 1976. A woman passenger, Jean Ann McDaid, was also hospitalized. No one has ever been arrested for Krosky's murder, although police believe the gunman was Meredith.

Frank Passalaqua was one of four white inmates investigated over the homicide of Alfred Chisholm, a black inmate who was strangled to death at Northern Correctional Institution on November 10, 1977.

Bridgeport Hells Angels chapter president Daniel Eugene "Diamond Dan" Bifield, along with Susan Corin Bouton, was arrested by local police officers in Milford on October 3, 1979, after being observed with a 12-gauge pump-action shotgun in his vehicle. A .45 caliber semi-automatic handgun was also found in Bouton's possession. Bifield was on probation for a 1975 assault on a policeman at the time. He was convicted of possession of a shotgun by a convicted felon in October 1980 and was sentenced to two years in prison on November 20, 1980.

Joseph Whelan fatally stabbed bar patron John Matulionis after a verbal altercation in a Bridgeport barroom on February 24, 1980. He was sentenced to twenty-five-years-to-life in prison for the murder.

Hells Angels sergeant-at-arms Daniel "Dan" Klimas shot and killed Todd Festa, a rejected club prospect and state police informant, in Wallingford on January 7, 1998. Klimas pleaded guilty to murder and possession of a pistol without a permit, and was sentenced to twenty-eight years in prison on March 3, 2000.

Hells Angels associate Howard Hammer was contracted by loanshark James Broderick III to collect a $1,500 loan from a delinquent debtor in late December 2015. When the individual failed to pay the debt and falsely claimed to be the acting president of the New York Hells Angels chapter, he was stabbed eight times, beaten with a hammer and blinded in one eye in a New Milford hotel room on January 25, 2016. Broderick and Hammer were arrested on May 27, 2016. Hammer refused to identify those involved in the assault, although an investigation revealed that members of the Hells Angels' Bridgeport chapter had attacked the victim in connection with the extortion scheme. Hammer pleaded guilty to conspiracy to participate in the collection and attempted collection of an extension of credit by extortionate means on December 2, 2016, and was sentenced to two-and-a-half years' imprisonment on June 1, 2017. Broderick pleaded guilty to the same charge on December 7, 2016, and was sentenced to two years' on June 29, 2017.

=== Racketeering ===
Daniel Bifield and two Bridgeport Hells Angels associates, including Daniel's father Richard Bifield, were convicted of conspiring to make and collect extortionate loans, and Hobbs Act violations on August 4, 1981, for their involvement in a loansharking operation headed by Francis "Fat Franny" Curcio, a made member of the Genovese crime family. As an inmate awaiting sentencing, Daniel Bifield and three others escaped from the Bridgeport Correctional Center on September 23, 1981. He became the subject of an international manhunt by the Federal Bureau of Investigation (FBI) and, at one point, a body found in the East River in New York City was incorrectly identified as that of Bifield. After spending several weeks in the United States, he fled to the Bahamas. Successfully managing to elude his pursuers, Bifield finally returned to the U.S. in late January 1982 and went to Denver, Colorado, where he was eventually apprehended by United States Marshals Service (USMS) and FBI agents on February 5, 1982. Bifield was sentenced two weeks after his capture to two consecutive twenty-year prison sentences on the extortion charge. He was then found guilty on June 10, 1982, of escape from the custody of the United States Attorney General, and was sentenced to an additional five years' imprisonment to be served consecutively.

Thirty-seven members and associates of the Bridgeport Hells Angels were arrested on racketeering and drug trafficking charges on May 2, 1985, in connection with a three-year FBI investigation of the club known as Operation Roughrider. The arrests took place in three cities across Connecticut. Among those indicted was an officer of the Bridgeport PD, Joseph Seamons. Two law enforcement officers were injured during the raids; state trooper Angel Gonzalez was wounded when a suspect fired at him through the door of a house in Stratford, and a Drug Enforcement Administration (DEA) official suffered a broken toe while using a sledgehammer to break through an armored clubhouse door in Bridgeport. An undercover FBI agent, Kevin P. Bonner, infiltrated the club for over two years and made drug deals with various chapters during the investigation. The operation involved around a thousand law enforcement personnel, and resulted in the arrests of a total of 133 Hells Angels members and associates during approximately fifty coordinated raids carried out in eleven states. The raids also led to the seizure of $2.6 million worth of cocaine, marijuana, methamphetamine, hashish, PCP and LSD, as well as weapons including Uzi submachine guns and rocket launchers. Thirty-five of those charged were convicted – including Roger "Bear" Mariani, Robert "Red Dog" Redmann and Joseph Whelan, who were each sentenced to fifteen years in prison. One Hells Angel, Robert Banning, became a cooperating witness. In 1986, detective Nicholas Barone of the Connecticut State Police received intelligence indicating that he and H. James Pickerstein, Chief Assistant U.S. Attorney for the District of Connecticut, were to be physically harmed by the HAMC in retaliation for their efforts in the investigation and subsequent prosecutions. These attempts at violence were to be funded by the Hells Angels' Oakland, California chapter. As a result, Barone was subject to intense security for an extended period of time.

=== Gang wars ===
Roger Mariani, a senior member of the Hells Angels in Connecticut, was shot and killed while riding his motorcycle on the Connecticut Turnpike in West Haven on April 2, 2006. The shooting happened after a group of over twenty motorcyclists was involved in an altercation with four men travelling in a sport utility vehicle. Another Hells Angels member, Paul Carrol, was also wounded when shots were fired from the car. Within hours of Mariani's killing, two Hells Angels – Trevor Delaware and Jeffrey Richard – were arrested near the home of an Outlaws member in Enfield, in possession of weapons including knives and a loaded gun as well as pages from a classified state police manual that lists identities and addresses of gang members. The pair were charged with weapons possession and theft of a license plate.

The Hells Angels are considered suspects in the murder of Joseph "HoJo" Ferraiolo, the president of the Outlaws' Waterbury chapter, who died from multiple gunshot wounds after being ambushed outside a tattoo parlor he owned in Hamden on February 9, 2010. No one has ever been arrested in the case, which police consider an open investigation.

== Illinois ==
The Hells Angels were suspected by federal authorities of supplying methamphetamine to two Chicago area biker gangs, the Hell's Henchmen and the Invaders. The Hell's Henchmen, one of the oldest and largest motorcycle gangs in the area, had chapters in Chicago, Calument City, Rockford and South Bend, Indiana, while the Invaders were founded in Gary, Indiana. In the late 1980s, rumors began to circulate that the Hells Angels were planning to absorb the Hell's Henchmen.

The Hell's Henchmen traditionally coexisted with the Outlaws, the dominant motorcycle gang in the Midwest, with little violence as the Henchmen showed no ambition to challenge the Outlaws. The Outlaws attempted to coerce the Hell's Henchmen into "patching over", however, after the Henchmen carried out a forced merger of the Devil's Ushers gang on the West Side of Chicago, an amalgamation the Outlaws considered a threat to their power. The Hell's Henchmen resisted the pressure from the Outlaws and agreed to "prospect" for the Hells Angels instead after holding a meeting with Minneapolis, Minnesota chapter president Patrick "Pat" Matter in Indiana in August 1993. The Minneapolis chapter of the Hells Angels, which was the closest Hells Angels chapter to Chicago, sponsored the Hell's Henchmen, and Matter orchestrated the club's expansion into Illinois and Indiana.

The Hells Angels decided to amalgamate the Hell's Henchmen in order to gain a foothold in the large and lucrative drug trade in the Chicago area. Targeting the methamphetamine market in city's White neighborhoods and suburbs, the Hells Angels avoided any conflict with Chicago's Black and Hispanic drug gangs but became the primary competition of the Outlaws. When Outlaws leaders learned in late 1993 that the Hells Angels were attempting to gain a presence in the Chicago area, the Outlaws began carrying out a series of violent attacks on the Hell's Henchmen and the Invaders in an attempt to discourage them from joining the Hells Angels and to prevent the Hells Angels from infiltrating their territory. In order to protect their criminal rackets from the Hells Angels, the Outlaws favored bombings, as well as the use of assault rifles.

Four leading members of the Hells Angels in northern Illinois were arrested and charged with numerous crimes including violating the Racketeer Influenced and Corrupt Organizations (RICO) Act in 2005, following a four-year federal investigation into the club. At least three were convicted; Melvin "Road" Chancey (president of the Chicago chapter from 1997 to 1999) was sentenced to nine years in prison, David G. "Pulley" Ohlendorf (president of the Spring Valley chapter from 2003) was sentenced to four years in prison and Richard A. Abrams (a former president of both the Rockford and Spring Valley chapters) was sentenced to three years in prison during trials in June and July 2006. Their group carried out the June 25, 1994 shooting of a rival club president in Cook County, threatened to bomb a rival gang's clubhouse in Kankakee in March 1995, and planned two murders in Peoria and Joliet, crimes they committed to protect sales of cocaine and methamphetamine with a street value of $624,000 from 1993 through 2002.

== Indiana ==
In 2016, law enforcement received public backlash for heavily patrolling the area where the HAMC was holding a charity for educational programs for children with special needs. Citizens took issue with authorities summoning the Chicago area's SWAT team and helicopter unit for the relatively small bike night, which attracted about eighty motorcycles to the small bar where the event was hosted. One HAMC member summed up the public's feelings in an interview:

"As far as what we view as the excessive law enforcement build-up that's always present at our events, they've made it clear to us that they don't want motorcycle clubs in Porter County ... We do understand the need for law enforcement in our society, however what happened Thursday night was a waste of their talents and a waste of our tax dollars."

The Angel then once again reaffirmed that the main purpose of his club was for men to ride motorcycles together and that this was a purely charitable event. He then spoke about how his chapter is working to support the communities that support his club.

== Kentucky ==
In October 1988, Ralph "Sonny" Barger, the Hells Angels' Oakland (California) chapter president and reputed national leader, and Michael Vincent "Irish" O'Farrell, the former Oakland president, were convicted of plotting to carry out bomb attacks in Louisville and elsewhere against members of the Outlaws. Three other club members were also found guilty on lesser charges, while five others were acquitted. The government contended the Hells Angels planned the attacks in revenge for the murder of John Cleve Webb, a member of Hells Angels' Anchorage (Alaska) chapter, who was shot outside a Jefferson County bar on August 12, 1986. A Louisville Outlaws member later pleaded guilty to reckless homicide in Webb's death.

== Maryland ==
Pagans member Christopher J. Brennan shot and wounded three Hells Angels at a bar in Deale on May 30, 2002, when he fired shots from a van with a .32 caliber pistol. Brennan pleaded guilty to reckless endangerment and was sentenced to ninety days in jail in November 2002 after prosecutors dropped additional other charges, which included attempted first-degree and second-degree murder, due to "a distinct lack of witness cooperation".

Three members of the North Beach Hells Angels chapter – chapter president John Anthony Beal, vice-president Lewis James Hall and Cornelius Wood Alexander, as well as Hall's wife Traecy Eugenia Hall – were indicted on federal drug and firearm charges, and were arrested by the ATF during a series of simultaneous raids on July 24, 2003. Federal agents uncovered seventeen firearms, over 270 rounds of ammunition, a bulletproof vest and methamphetamine during the raids. According to affidavits filed in federal court, two undercover ATF agents who had infiltrated the Warlocks witnessed Beal sell cocaine to two Warlocks members at the Hells Angels' clubhouse on May 3, 2003. The arrests followed a nationwide investigation into the Hells Angels which also resulted in operations against the club in five other east coast states.

== Massachusetts ==
The HAMC has established chapters in Lowell, Lynn, Salem, Cape Cod (headquartered in Buzzards Bay) and Berkshire County (headquartered in Lee). The "Bad Company" chapter in Lowell, founded in 1966, was the club's first branch on the East Coast. The Hells Angels are the most significant motorcycle gang involved in drug trafficking in Massachusetts, and have also collaborated with the Boston faction of the Patriarca crime family in loansharking and narcotics distribution.

== Minnesota ==
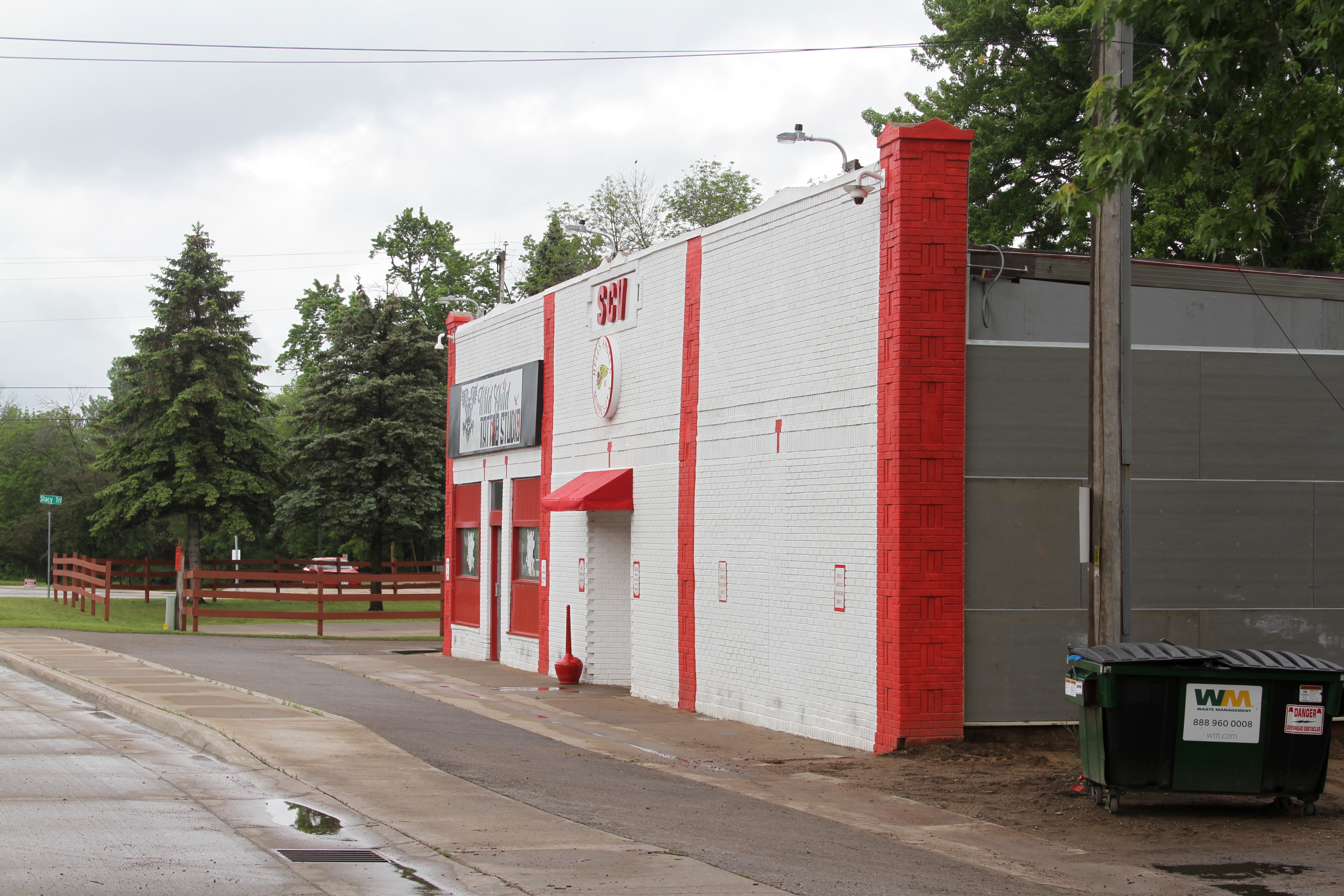
The clubhouse of the Hells Angels' St. Croix Valley chapter in Stacy

The Minneapolis charter of the Hells Angels was founded on September 18, 1982 when the Grim Reapers' Minneapolis chapter "patched over" to form the first Hells Angels club in Minnesota, with Patrick Joseph "Pat" Matter as founding president.

On March 27, 1986, Minneapolis chapter president Pat Matter was arrested at his home in Robbinsdale by agents of the Bureau of Alcohol, Tobacco, Firearms and Explosives (ATF), the Minnesota Bureau of Criminal Apprehension (BCA), and the Robbinsdale and Minneapolis police departments after being indicted for illegal possession of a firearm, as part of Operation One Percenter, a nationwide federal investigation into motorcycle gangs headed by the ATF. Operation One Percenter resulted in the arrests of 53 members of 18 different biker gangs on various weapons and narcotics charges, during a series of raids in 18 U.S. states, and the seizure of 10 sawed-off shotguns, 10 machine guns, 63 rifles, 100 handguns, 4,500 rounds of ammunition, six silencers, a bomb, four hand grenades, five pounds of dynamite, 15 stolen vehicles, a stolen computer and a drug lab, as well as large quantities of cocaine, marijuana and PCP. On May 15, 1986, Matter pleaded guilty to possession of a firearm by a convicted felon as part of a plea agreement under which he would be sentenced to no more than two years in prison.

Following an attempted car bomb assassination of Matter by the Outlaws in December 1993, the Hells Angels retaliated by bombing an Outlaws-owned tattoo parlor in Milwaukee. On October 12, 1994, a tattoo parlor in suburban Milwaukee owned by Outlaws member Peter "Debris" Gross was bombed. The bombing was allegedly carried out by Hells Angels "prospect" Charles "Peewee" Goldsmith on the orders of Matter.

== Missouri ==
On April 27, 2022, in Springfield, Missouri, two men in a white Chevrolet Camaro came to the clubhouse and opened fire on Hells Angels members standing outside. One man was shot. Local police executed a search warrant of the clubhouse, recovering video recordings related to the shooting. The shooting victim told police, "You need to catch who did this before the Angels do, because they're going to kill them."

== Nebraska ==
The first Hells Angels chapter in the United States outside of California was established in Omaha in 1966. The Hells Angels are involved in retail-level methamphetamine distribution in Nebraska.

=== Violent incidents ===
Eleven people were arrested when police visited a party involving Hells Angels members in Omaha on September 14, 1967, after a complaint by Adolph A. Carl, the owner of the house where the party was being held. Nine of the eleven were convicted of disorderly conduct and fined $25 each.

A group of ten Hells Angels were involved in a brawl with police who attempted to eject them from a bar in Omaha on August 12, 1969. Hells Angels member Francis "Frank" Bayless was convicted of assault with intent to inflict great bodily injury after he attacked a police officer with a can opener. He was sentenced to a term of one-to-three years in prison.

Hells Angels member Louis Lundholm was charged with beating a man with a baseball bat and pushing a man in a wheelchair down a flight of stairs after an incident at a party in Omaha in November 1971.

The North Omaha home of Nebraska State Liquor Commission inspector John Duprey was bombed on April 7, 1972. The Bureau of Alcohol, Tobacco, Firearms and Explosives (ATF) discovered that the bomber used dynamite with a four-inch fuse. In August 1972, federal agents raided the home of Hells Angels member Roger Levell in East Omaha on suspicion of his connection to the explosion. While weapons and drugs were found, no related explosives were reported.

Two bodies discovered west of the Elkhorn River in southwestern Douglas County in April 1973 were suspected to be those of Omaha Hells Angels members Louis Lundholm and John Peterson. One had been shot in the head and the other's skull had been fractured with a blunt instrument.

Hells Angel Leslie Fitzgerald was shot and killed during a fight involving two couples outside a Hells Angels party in North Omaha on July 12, 1980. Fitzgerald's killer was acquitted of second-degree murder by reason of self-defense.

Jay Witt was sentenced to thirty-to-forty years in prison after pleading guilty to charges of manslaughter, use of a weapon and possession of a weapon by a prohibited person in connection with the death of Hells Angels member William "Willy" John Furlong, who died after being shot three times at the Omaha chapter's clubhouse on July 14, 2013. Witt died at the Nebraska State Penitentiary on September 25, 2019, aged fifty-three.

=== Murders ===
Hells Angels member Orval Hinz, along with Ronald Eugene Kirby and Robert Walker, was charged with first-degree murder after Gilbert Arthur Batten, Jr. was shot in the head and killed at a house in Omaha on September 20, 1968. Kirby – who was in a dispute with Batten's acquaintance James Lynch over a woman named Judy Dunbar – testified that Hinz and Walker accompanied him as he went to Lynch's home armed with a .22 caliber survival rifle, and that Batten was killed when the rifle accidentally fired as the trio assaulted Batten and Lynch. Kirby was convicted of Batten's murder and sentenced to life imprisonment.

Hells Angels member Thomas Edward "Red" Nesbitt killed Mary Kay Harmer at a drug party at his Omaha home during the early morning hours of November 30, 1975. With the help of Nesbitt's friend and neighbor Wayne Bieber, Harmer's body was dumped in a manhole in Carter Lake, Iowa after being stored in Bieber's garage for approximately thirty-six hours. Authorities theorize that Harmer was lured to Nesbitt's home by two women seeking a sexual partner for two Hells Angels, and that she was murdered when she resisted their advances. Her remains were discovered by an engineering crew in April 1984. Forensic experts were unable to determine the cause of death. Nesbitt was arrested for Harmer's murder as well as for conspiracy to manufacture methamphetamine by Drug Enforcement Administration (DEA) agents while living under an alias in New Carlisle, Indiana on October 26, 1984. His Brazilian girlfriend Anna DaSilva was also arrested on drug charges. Nesbitt was convicted of murder in the first degree on March 7, 1986, and sentenced to a term of life imprisonment.

=== Drug trafficking ===
The Bureau of Narcotics and Dangerous Drugs (BNDD) set up a front operation dealing in narcotics, gambling and pornography in Omaha after infiltrating the Minneapolis, Minnesota chapter of the Hells Angels via identical means beginning in December 1969. On April 21, 1970, Minneapolis Hells Angels member Steven Paul Liley obtained heroin from Roger Curtis Levell and Dale Ray "Corky" Haley – vice-president and secretary-treasurer of the Omaha Hells Angels chapter, respectively – in Omaha. The drugs had been furnished by Minneapolis chapter vice-president Roger Lee Sheehan, who purchased them from the Oakland, California chapter. One ounce of the heroin was sold by Liley in an Omaha motel to special agent Jack Walsh, who was posing as a bookie. Haley and Levell sold two ounces of heroin, and Omaha chapter president Gerald Franklin Smith sold methamphetamine, to special agent James McDowell on September 15, 1970. McDowell and Thomas Liley – a government informant and the brother of Steven Liley – made another drug deal with Haley, Levell and Smith on October 14, 1970, purchasing three ounces of heroin along with methamphetamine. Haley, Levell and Smith were arrested on October 15, 1970, as part of a federal operation which also resulted in arrests of other Hells Angels in Minneapolis and San Francisco, California. Haley was convicted of conspiring to sell narcotics, while Smith was convicted on four counts of unlawfully possessing and selling narcotics, and one count of conspiracy. Levell failed to appear for trial in February 1971.

Ten members and associates of the Omaha Hells Angels, including chapter president Walter "Larry" Phillips and treasurer Lamont D. Kress, were indicted on February 18, 1981, for their role in a conspiracy that used intimidation, assault, torture and murder to establish a monopoly of the methamphetamine trade in the Omaha area. The drug, manufactured in clandestine labs throughout the United States and obtained from other Hells Angels chapters in multipound quantities, was delivered to Omaha in motorcycles and motorcycle parts, cars and vans. The conspiracy began in December 1972 and is suspected in the unsolved murder of Joseph Sackett, who was found dead in a field after being shot execution-style in August 1979. An eighteen-month investigation culminated in a series of raids on ten locations in Omaha, one in Council Bluffs, Iowa and another in Santa Rosa, California on February 28 in which around eighty officers from federal, state, county and municipal law enforcement agencies made six arrests and recovered a cache of rifles, shotguns and automatic weapons, as well as narcotics ranging from marijuana to cocaine. Four Hells Angels – Gary D. Apker, James "Jim Bob" Cronin, Calvin Davenport and Raymond "Buzzard" Gearhart – and Janice Fitzgerald, the widow of slain Hells Angels member Leslie Fitzgerald, were convicted of felony firearms violations and drug possession on November 30, 1981.

The Omaha Police Department (OPD) initiated a three-year undercover investigation targeting a cocaine distribution network in the Omaha metropolitan area. The Federal Bureau of Investigation (FBI) became involved in the investigation, called Operation Zookeeper, in July 1982. A federal grand jury indicted forty-three individuals, many of them Hells Angels, in 1983. By the end of the year, fifteen members of the drug ring had pled guilty, and many of the others were later convicted.

Arrests were made during a series of coordinated raids carried out in Omaha on May 2, 1985, as part of Operation Roughrider, an FBI investigation of the Hells Angels that commenced three years prior. An undercover FBI agent, Kevin P. Bonner, infiltrated the club for twenty-six months and made drug transactions with numerous chapters as part of the investigation, which resulted in the indictments of a total of 133 Hells Angels members and associates in eleven states on narcotics trafficking and racketeering charges. The raids, involving approximately a thousand law enforcement personnel, also led to the seizure of cocaine, marijuana, methamphetamine, hashish, PCP and LSD valued at $2 million, as well as weapons including submachine guns and anti-tank weaponry.

Fifteen Hells Angels members and associates were arrested in the Omaha area on October 17, 1990, after being indicted on charges including interstate and foreign travel in support of racketeering enterprises, money laundering, manufacturing and distribution of a controlled substance, and felony possession of a firearm. The arrests, which came during a series of simultaneous raids on fourteen locations including the club's Omaha headquarters, were the culmination of a two-year investigation. The raids also resulted in confiscation of rifles, a .22 caliber automatic pistol, $800,000 worth of drugs, $200,000 in cash as well as Hells Angels paraphernalia. Hells Angels members Dale Ray Haley and Lamont Kress, the club's former East Coast regional treasurer, along with associates Timothy S. Egan, Mary Lee and Rodney Rumsey were convicted on May 15, 1992, of drug trafficking, money laundering and illegal weapons possession. Haley was sentenced to twenty years' imprisonment, Kress, Egan and Rumsey were sentenced to fifteen years and eight months', and Lee was sentenced to twelve years and three months'. Five others negotiated plea bargains, and another was acquitted.

== Nevada ==
The River Run Riot occurred on April 27, 2002, at the Harrah's Casino & Hotel in Laughlin, Nevada. Members of the Hells Angels and the Mongols motorcycle clubs fought each other on the casino floor. As a result, Mongol Anthony Barrera, 43, was stabbed to death, and two Hells Angels, Jeramie Bell, 27, and Robert Tumelty, 50, were shot to death. On February 23, 2007, Hells Angels members James Hannigan and Rodney Cox were sentenced to two years in prison. Cox and Hannigan were captured on videotape confronting Mongols members inside the casino. A Hells Angel member can be clearly seen on the casino security videotape performing a front kick on a Mongol biker member, causing the ensuing melee.

However, prior to this altercation, several incidents of harassment and provocation were noted in the Clark County, Nevada Grand Jury hearings as having been perpetrated upon The Hells Angels. Members of the Mongols accosted a vendor's table selling Hells Angels trademarked items, had surrounded a Hells Angel and demanded he remove club clothing. In addition, nine witnesses claimed the fight began when a Mongol kicked a member of the Hells Angels. Regardless of which minor physical incident can be said to have "caused the melee", it is clear that The Hells Angels had come to confront the Mongols concerning their actions.

Attorneys for the Hells Angels claimed that the Hells Angels were defending themselves from an attack initiated by the Mongols.

Charges were dismissed against 36 other Hells Angels originally named in the indictment.

== New Hampshire ==
Eleven members of the Hells Angels' Lowell, Massachusetts chapter were arrested on narcotics-related charges during a raid by twenty-six federal, state and local law enforcement officers on a dwelling in Nashua on September 9, 1969. A cache of heroin was also seized. Chapter president Donald James "Skeets" Picard was convicted on two counts of heroin trafficking and sentenced to two concurrent twenty-year prison sentences.

On June 12, 1972, Hells Angels members Robert Gardner and Kevin Gilroy were shot while riding their motorcycles on Interstate 93 in Londonderry by Dean Dayutis, a member of the Devil's Disciples Motorcycle Club who fired at the pair from a moving vehicle. Gardner was wounded and Gilroy was killed. Dayutis was arrested in Key West, Florida on November 2, 1982, and was repatriated to New Hampshire to face trial for Gilroy's killing in May 1983 after a five-month extradition process. He was convicted of second-degree murder later that year and sentenced to eighteen-to-forty years of imprisonment.

The Hells Angels formed their first chapter in New Hampshire when members from Massachusetts and Maine established a branch in Manchester in March 2000.

An innocent bystander was wounded with a shotgun during a fight involving the Hells Angels, Outlaws, and Milford and Company Motorcycle Club outside a restaurant in Manchester on April 16, 2010.

Hells Angels member James Cunningham was among four men arrested in June 2017 on federal drug trafficking charges following an investigation that spanned several years. Cunningham sold methamphetamine to an individual who was cooperating with the Federal Bureau of Investigation (FBI) on four separate occasions in Manchester and Merrimack between May 23 and November 20, 2013. He pleaded guilty to methamphetamine trafficking, and was sentenced to three years and three months in prison on May 10, 2018.

== New Jersey ==
During their war against the Breed in the 1970s, the Hells Angels carried out a grenade attack on the home of the Breed's national president in Plainfield.

In 1983, two members of the Binghamton, New York Hells Angels chapter were charged with assault and attempted murder after a shootout with the New Jersey State Police (NJSP) in Hope Township.

The Hells Angels established a presence in New Jersey in 2002 with the founding of a prospect chapter in Newark, which was sponsored by the HAMC chapters in New Rochelle, New York and New York City. The Newark chapter was formed following a treaty between the Hells Angels and the Pagans in February 2002. The New Jersey faction is small, but is backed by the New York City chapter – one of the club's largest.

Three Hells Angels were beaten by a group of Pagans members and associates outside a bar in Woodland Township on January 1, 2005. One Hells Angel, Vincent "Honcho" Heinrich, was airlifted to Cooper University Hospital with head injuries after being struck with a wooden board. No arrests were made. The incident, which occurred during a time when the Hells Angels were actively recruiting from the Pagans stronghold of South Jersey, allegedly prompted the Hells Angels' East Coast leader John "The Baptist" LoFranco to declare war on the Pagans.

Four Hells Angels members – Rocco P. Gullatta, Kerry K. Kester, Justin D. Morris and Joshua R. Woods – were indicted on charges of unlawful possession of weapons, possession of a prohibited weapon, certain persons not to possess a weapon, and unlawful possession of a controlled dangerous substance after law enforcement officials observed them loading large knives, machetes and other weapons into the trunk of a Chevrolet Malibu in a restaurant parking lot in Clinton Township on August 22, 2015.

== New York ==
The Hells Angels founded their first chapters in New York state on December 5, 1969 by "patching over" the Aliens motorcycle gang of New York City and the Hackers biker gang in Rochester. In 1975, another chapter was established in Binghamton. With additional chapters in New Rochelle and Troy, the Hells Angels have a presence in the Hudson Valley, as well as in Suffolk County on Long Island. The New York City charter is among the club's largest, and, along with the Cleveland chapter in Ohio, is responsible for coordinating all Hells Angels activities in the Eastern United States as well as those of chapters in Canada and Europe.

== North Carolina ==
The Omaha, Nebraska chapter of the Hells Angels granted a charter to the Storm Troopers biker gang of Durham, which became North Carolina's first Hells Angels chapter on July 24, 1973. This was then followed by the "patch over" of the Tar Hell Stompers to form the Charlotte chapter, which was chartered on October 19, 1978. The Original Jokers in Winston-Salem joined the Hells Angels in 1979, after the "patch over" of the Tribulators from Charleston, South Carolina.

The Charlotte chapter was formed by Michael Franklin "Thunder" Finazzo – a member of the Omaha chapter and one of the Hells Angels' elite "Filthy Few" – and others. Charlotte was home to numerous motorcycle gangs at the time, including the Outlaws, but under Finazzo's leadership, the Hells Angels were able to take control of much of the city's criminal rackets, and operated drug, prostitution and motorcycle theft rings throughout the state.

During the Hells Angels' international rally held at a private campground on Kerr Lake on July 4, 1981, journalists covering the event for The Charlotte Observer were assaulted by Hells Angels members. Staff reporters Robin Clark and Tex O'Neill were punched and photographer Mark Sluder was forced to turn over his film at knifepoint. The attack was stopped when O'Neill alerted FBI agents who were also observing the rally.

Michael Finazzo and his lieutenant Tyler Duris "Yank" Frndak were found shot dead and stuffed in the trunk of an Oldsmobile 88 in Randolph County on September 26, 1981. At the time, Finazzo was considered by police to be among the ten most powerful members of the club. Although the murders remain unsolved, police believe that the killings were related to a feud with the Outlaws or a power struggle within the Hells Angels. Club members from across the United States, as well as Canada, Denmark, England and the Netherlands, attended the burials of both men, which took place in Marshville on October 1, 1981.

Finazzo's successor as chapter president, Fred Martin Scarnechia, and another Hells Angel, Thomas Lee Campbell, pistol-whipped undercover DEA agent John Landrum amidst a scuffle during a drug deal sting operation, in which Scarnechia was also stabbed, at Scarnechia's home in Fort Mill, South Carolina on July 27, 1982. Authorities then obtained warrants to search a storage unit in nearby Rock Hill, South Carolina, where they uncovered a booby-trapped stockpile of weapons consisting of C-4 explosive, grenades, ammunition and two fully-automatic submachine guns equipped with silencers. The ATF was called in to investigate the seizure, and an explosive ordnance disposal unit from the Fort Jackson Army base was required to disarm the trap. Scarnechia and Campbell were sentenced to five years in prison for assaulting the federal agent on January 6, 1983.

The Charlotte chapter was at one point the Hells Angels' largest on the east coast, with approximately a dozen members and numerous associates, but was disbanded after its position became precarious following the murders of Finazzo and Frndak, and the imprisonment of Scarnechia. The chapter clubhouse, known as "the Bunker", was burned down in a suspected arson attack on August 12, 1985. Investigators believe that the Hells Angels themselves destroyed the property before their departure.

== Ohio ==
The Hells Angels have established a presence in Northeast Ohio, with chapters in Akron, Cleveland, Lake County and Portage County. The first HAMC chapter in Ohio was chartered on December 16, 1967 when two clubs – the Gooses Motorcycle Club, founded in 1960, and the Animals Motorcycle Club – merged to form the Cleveland faction, known as the "Dirty 30". The Cleveland chapter is influential in the club's national organization and is reputed to be the location of the national treasury. The Cleveland and New York City chapters also govern all Hells Angels activities in the Eastern United States as well as those of chapters in Canada and Europe. The Hells Angels are active in gunrunning, extortion, trafficking in stolen property and methamphetamine distribution in the Cleveland and Akron areas, and have been involved in contract killings and drug trafficking with the Cleveland crime family.

The New York chapter of the Hells Angels was involved in a large-scale brawl with the Breed, in which knives, chains and clubs were brandished, at a motorcycle trade show in Cleveland on March 6, 1971. The violence led to the deaths of five bikers; Breed members Bruce Emerick, Andrew Demeter, Amelio Gardull and Thomas A. Terry, and Hells Angels member Jeffrey "Groover" Coffey. Twenty-three people were also injured, including three police officers. Eighty-four people were arrested at the scene. On March 9, forty-seven Breed members and ten Hells Angels were each charged with five counts of first-degree murder. The feud between the two clubs reportedly began two years earlier after a fight in Philadelphia, Pennsylvania, and continued during the following two decades.

Cleveland Hells Angels chapter vice president John Zanos was among 23 members, former members and associates of the Hells Angels, the Outlaws and the Pagans arrested on drug and firearm charges in January 1986 after a year-long federal drug investigation. Zanos allegedly threatened a cooperating witness who was wearing a tape recorder and transmitter by grabbing the woman and threatening to decapitate her if she continued to ask questions.

On February 27, 1988, David Hartlaub was murdered in his van at a bank parking lot near the Musicland record store that he managed as he was dropping off the nightly deposit. The deposit bag contained about $4000 in cash and was not taken. Three members of the Hells Angels motorcycle gang; Steven Wayne Yee, Mark Verdi, and John Ray Bonds were carrying out a hit. The Cleveland Hells Angels were planning to retaliate against a Sandusky Outlaw gang member for the Joliet, IL shooting of a Hells Angels member the previous year, at which Bonds had been present. The Outlaw member drove a van almost identical to Hartlaub's. The trio mistook Hartlaub's van for their and shot and killed him by mistake. Both the gun and the van's carpet were spattered with blood, allowing police to use DNA evidence, and discovered that John Ray Bonds was the shooter who had hid inside Hartlaub's van and was waiting to kill him. He shot him with a MAC-11 9-mm semi-automatic pistol fitted with a homemade silencer. Bonds's DNA profile analyzed by the FBI matched the bloodstains found in Yee's car and based on this they were able to use it as key evidence. This was one of the first cases of DNA being used for criminal conviction. The trial and legal wrangling lasted nearly two years and ended in long prison terms for all three Hells Angels members, who remain in prison on sentences up to life. Mark Verdi was released in 2019.

== Oregon ==
Police have stated that the Hells Angels have avoided Oregon since 1967, when the state was ceded to the Gypsy Jokers to quell a San Francisco, California-area drug war between the clubs.

Hells Angels prospect Robert "Bugeye Bob" McClure was convicted of quadruple murder and sentenced to four consecutive life terms in July 1994 for the shootings of Margo Compton, her six-year-old twin daughters, Sylvia and Sandra, and Gary Seslar, the son of her boyfriend, in Gaston on August 7, 1977. McClure's alleged accomplice in the killings, Hells Angels hangaround Benjamin "Psycho" Silva, was never charged in the case; prosecutors felt it wasn't worth the expense and effort as he was already on death row for the 1981 kidnapping, rape, torture and murder of two college students in Lassen County, California. Odis "Buck" Garrett, the Hells Angels Vallejo, California chapter president, ordered the killings of Compton and her daughters in retaliation for her testimony against several Hells Angels in a 1976 San Francisco prostitution trial. Garrett, a one-time millionaire methamphetamine dealer already serving a life term in California on a narcotics conviction, was found guilty on four counts of murder and sentenced to four consecutive life sentences in prison in July 1995. Garrett died in prison aged seventy-four on February 12, 2017.

== Pennsylvania ==
An alliance between the Pagans and the Philadelphia crime family has historically prevented the Hells Angels from establishing a presence in the Philadelphia area. In March 2002, a South Philadelphia tattoo parlor owned by a Pagans member who had been involved in a brawl with the Hells Angels on Long Island, New York the previous month was firebombed in what authorities suspect was a retaliatory attack by the Angels. In November 2002, a Hells Angels member was stabbed numerous times during a fight between the rival clubs in Northeast Philadelphia. The unattended clubhouse of the Sons of Satan, a Pagans support club, was destroyed by a pipe bomb explosion in Rapho Township on December 13, 2002. The case has yet to be officially solved, although authorities believe it to be the work of the Hells Angels.

A Hells Angels chapter was formed in West Philadelphia in 2004 after four high-ranking Pagans members – Mark "Slow Poke" Mangano, Anthony "Mint-Condition" Mengine, Thomas "Thinker" Wood and James "Slim Jim" Wysong – defected to the Angels the year before. On January 1, 2005, Hells Angels member Vincent "Honcho" Heinrich was airlifted to Cooper University Hospital after being assaulted by a group of Pagans outside a bar in Woodland Township, New Jersey, allegedly prompting the Angels' New York-based East Coast leader John "The Baptist" Lo Franco to declare war on the Philadelphia Pagans chapter. Wood, the vice president of the Philadelphia Hells Angels chapter, was shot dead while driving his GMC pickup truck on the Schuylkill Expressway after he and fellow Hells Angels member Byron "B&E" Evans departed a go-go bar in the early hours of January 15, 2005. Two men in a Chevrolet Suburban began firing at Evans, who was riding his Harley-Davidson motorcycle, and Wood swerved in an attempt to shield Evans when he was fatally shot in the head. Pagans members Robert "Go Fast" Gray and Steven "Gorilla" Mondevergine were questioned by police in relation to the murder, which has gone unsolved. On October 31, 2005, Pagans members allegedly stole a sign standing in front of the Hells Angels' clubhouse, resulting in an exchange of gunfire. The Philadelphia Hells Angels chapter, consisting of twelve members and approximately five prospects, was disbanded during a meeting in New York on November 18, 2005. Law enforcement believe the demise of the chapter was a result of poor leadership by LoFranco, who ordered the outmatched Hells Angels to carry out a war against the better-established Pagans.

== Rhode Island ==
The Hells Angels' Rhode Island chapter was formed in Providence on September 5, 1992. The Hells Angels have established a working relationship with the Providence faction of the Patriarca crime family, acting as enforcers for the Mafia.

Christian A. Rufino, a member of the New Rochelle, New York ("New Roc City") chapter of the Hells Angels, was sentenced to fifteen years in prison after being convicted on a federal firearms charge in April 2012. He was found to be in possession of cocaine, a loaded handgun and additional ammunition after a traffic stop in Cranston in December 2009.

Hells Angels member Douglas Leedham was sentenced to seven years in prison in July 2019 after pleading guilty to trafficking methamphetamine and cocaine, and being a felon in possession of a firearm. He was arrested in February that year when a court-authorized search of his North Providence home uncovered thirty-nine grams of methamphetamine, nineteen grams of cocaine, two handguns, a 12-gauge shotgun, body armor, dozens of knives and hatchets, brass knuckles, more than $6,000 in cash and material used in the packaging and distribution of drugs.

== South Carolina ==
The Hells Angels' first chapter in the Southern States was established in Charleston on February 7, 1976.

Artie Ray Cherry, a founding member of the Charleston chapter and a Special Forces veteran of the Vietnam War, died from a gunshot wound to the head after being shot during a bar brawl in Rock Hill in the early hours of January 7, 1982. Three other men were also injured during the melee, and Mack McClendon Teal – a man believed by police to have had a long association with gangs and nightclubs in the area – was charged with Cherry's murder. Cherry was killed in an apparent attempt to take over a bar from Teal. At the time of his death, Cherry was wanted by police for the murder of Carl Billingham, who died five days after being stabbed in the groin during a fight with four men at a nightclub in Charleston County in October 1979.

Fred Martin Scarnechia, the president of the Hells Angels' Charlotte, North Carolina chapter, and another club member, Thomas Lee Campbell, pistol-whipped and broke the nose of undercover DEA agent John Landrum when a sting operation drug deal went awry at Scarnechia's home in Fort Mill on July 27, 1982. Scarnechia was also stabbed during the skirmish. Authorities then obtained warrants to search a storage unit in nearby Rock Hill, where they uncovered a booby-trapped stockpile of weapons consisting of C-4 explosive, grenades, ammunition and two fully-automatic submachine guns equipped with silencers. The ATF was called in to investigate the seizure, and an Army explosive ordnance disposal unit from Fort Jackson was required to disarm the trap. On January 6, 1983, Scarnechia and Campbell were sentenced to five years in prison for assaulting Landrum.

Sixteen members and associates of the Hells Angels' South Carolina Nomads chapter, which operated from clubhouses in Lexington and Rock Hill, were convicted of crimes related to the RICO Act following a two-year cooperative investigation by the FBI, ATF, South Carolina Law Enforcement Division (SLED) and four local police departments. The investigation revealed that the group engaged in drug dealing, money laundering, firearms trafficking, violent crimes, attempted armed robbery, arson, and other offenses. In excess of one hundred guns (including fully automatic machine guns, silencers, assault rifles with high-capacity magazines, pistols, and sawed-off shotguns) were trafficked by the group and recovered during the execution of search warrants, and members of the organization also supplied methamphetamine, cocaine, bath salts and prescription pain pills. The Hells Angels' leadership coordinated the criminal activity and received kickbacks from proceeds generated by members and associates of the chapter. During the investigation, the chapter's leadership transitioned from long-time Hells Angels member "Diamond" Dan Bifield to recent inductee Mark "Lightning" Baker after Bifield was voted out as president. Law enforcement began the operation when Bifield made a drug deal with an informant in 2011 and arrested twenty people — sixteen men and four women — in a series of raids in June 2012. The last of the sixteen convicted were sentenced in June 2013; the group was sentenced to more than 100 years imprisonment collectively.

== Virginia ==
Four New York metropolitan area Hells Angels members and one prospect were convicted of ambushing and wounding two southern Virginia-based Pagans members at a motel near Greenville on September 10, 2018. The attack happened as the rival gangs happened to be staying at the same motel while passing through the area, and led to one Pagan being shot and the other beaten with a hammer. Dominick J. Eadicicco and club prospect Anthony Milan pleaded guilty to malicious wounding by a mob and use of a firearm in the commission of a felony and were sentenced to eight years in prison, while Nathaniel A. Villaman, Joseph Anthony Paturzo and Richard E. West all pleaded guilty to malicious wounding by a mob and were given four year sentences during the trials held in Staunton in January and February 2019.

== Washington ==
The Hells Angels established their presence in the Pacific Northwest when the club's San Fernando Valley charter sponsored a "prospect chapter" in Spokane in the summer of 1993. The Hells Angels Washington state Nomads chapter was officially founded on July 16, 1994. In 2016 a Chapter was also established in Seattle.

In 2001, Hells Angels Rodney Lee Rollness, a former Hells Angel, and Joshua Binder murdered Michael "Santa" Walsh, who had allegedly falsely claimed to be a member of the Hells Angels. Paul Foster, hoping to join the Hells Angels, aided in the murder by luring Walsh to a party at his house and helping cover up the crime. West Coast leader Richard "Smilin' Rick" Fabel, along with Rollness and Binder, were also convicted of various racketeering offenses.

== See also ==
- Bandidos MC criminal allegations and incidents in the United States

== Sources ==
=== Books ===
- Caine, Alex (2012). Charlie and the Angels: The Outlaws, the Hells Angels and the Sixty Years War. Toronto: Random House Canada. ISBN 9780307358950.
- Christie, George (2016). Exile on Front Street: My Life as a Hells Angel. New York City: Thomas Dunne Books. ISBN 9780283072666.
- Langton, Jerry Fallen Angel: The Unlikely Rise of Walter Stadnick and the Canadian Hells Angels Toronto: John Wiley & Sons, 2006, ISBN 9781443427258.
- Langton, Jerry Showdown: How the Outlaws, Hells Angels and Cops Fought for Control of the Streets, Toronto: John Wiley & Sons, 2010, ISBN 047067878X.
- Schnedier, Stephen Iced: The Story of Organized Crime in Canada, Toronto: John Wiley & Sons, 2009, ISBN 0470835001
- Sher, Julian & Marsden, William The Road To Hell How the Biker Gangs Are Conquering Canada, Toronto: Alfred Knopf, 2003, ISBN 0-676-97598-4
- Veno, Arthur (2007), The Mammoth Book of Bikers, Avalon Publishing Group, ISBN 9780786720460

=== Reports ===
- Ohio OC Consulting Committee (1986). 1986 Report of the Organized Crime Consulting Committee (PDF) (Report). Attorney General of Ohio. Archived from the original (PDF) on June 30, 2022 – via National Criminal Justice Reference Service.
- Richardson, A. (May 1991). Outlaw Motorcycle Gangs – USA Overview (PDF) (Report). State of California Department of Justice, Bureau of Organized Crime and Criminal Intelligence. Archived from the original (PDF) on May 26, 2023 – via United States Department of Justice.
