= Grondalski family murders =

1986 family murder by the Hells Angels in California, United States

- Date: 5 October 1986
- Location: Mendocino County, California, U.S.
- Type: Mass murder
- Motive: Retaliation for leaving Hells Angels "in bad standing" and not covering up gang tattoos
- Perpetrator: Hells Angels
- Deaths: 4
- Convicted: Gerry "Butch" Lester, Charles "Chuck" Diaz

The Grondalski family murders by the Hells Angels occurred on October 5, 1986, in Mendocino County, California, in the United States.

== Background ==
William "Billy" Grondalski was a worker at an oil refinery in Martinez and a "wrencher" (slang for a mechanic). He married Patricia "Patty" Kast, a receptionist at a beauty salon who had a teenage son, Jeremy, from a previous marriage. Together, the couple had a daughter, Dallas, born in 1981. In 1982, Billy Grondalski joined the Vallejo chapter of the Hells Angels. The working class Grondalski seems to have joined the Hells Angels out of the belief that it would make him into a wealthy man. Instead, Grondalski engaged in substance abuse as he drank heavily and became addicted to methamphetamine. Grondalski had a tattoo of the Hells Angels death's head logo on his arm. A number of Hells Angels frequently visited the Grondalski household and knew the Grondalski children well, most notably Charles "Chuck" Diaz. Debroah "Debbie" Kast, the sister of Patty, recalled about Dallas: "She was just a smart little girl for her age." In 1985, Patty Grondalski filed for divorce under the grounds that her husband spent more time with the Hells Angels than with her.

In April 1986, a Hells Angel from the Oakland chapter, Terry Dalton, was expelled for stealing, and Sonny Barger, the Angels leader, forbade the Angels from having any social contact with him. On May 14, 1986, Barger issued a photograph of Dalton to Hells Angel chapters saying that Dalton had been expelled and some of the chapters, especially the Vallejo chapter, were "fucking up" by continuing to talk to Dalton. In July 1986, Barger summoned the entire Vallejo chapter to the clubhouse of his Oakland chapter where the Vallejo chapter president, Derrick Kualapi, and several others were beaten for continuing to talk to Dalton. Grondalski seems to have been horrified about the beatings he witnessed. Grondalski had maintained ties with Dalton and was selling drugs on the territories of other Angels, which led him to fear that he likewise might be beaten or worse. After the witnessing the beatings, Billy Grondalski told his estranged wife that he wished to leave the Angels, which led to a reconciliation. Billy told his estranged wife while she was visiting her father in the hospital "I'm out of the club", which led her to say "I'm so glad". Grondalski showed her a new tattoo he added under his Hells Angels death's head tattoo reading "84 In 86 Out". On August 21, 1986, Barger appointed Gerry "Butch" Lester as the new president of the Vallejo chapter. On September 27, 1986, Lester reported to Barger: "Billy has, uh, since become the, uh, in bad standing. Tattoos need to be covered, and notify Vallejo if anybody sees him. We wanna talk to him, and that's it basically". The fact that Grondalski had not covered his Hells Angels tattoos up after leaving was a source of much rage in the Hells Angels. Patty told her sister Debbie that she was afraid for her life as she told her "It's not over. It's not".

The Grondalski family lived like fugitives, and moved to a new house in Fort Bragg on October 1, 1986. Most notably, Billy and Patty only moved their furniture at night. Debbie Kast, the sister of Patty, noted that Billy "seemed nervous" the last time she saw him on October 4, 1986, during a visit to her house. Later that evening, Billy received a phone call and suddenly said: "Come on, we're getting out of here!" On the same day, the Hells Angels were holding a run in Sonoma County where two Hells Angels, Gerry "Butch" Lester and Charles "Chuck" Diaz, borrowed a truck from another Angel, Michael "Little Mike" Tankersley. Lester and Diaz stated that they needed a vehicle to go to Fort Bragg as Grondalski had been found. Tankersley was a man with a long criminal record for assault. Another Hells Angel present at the run was Charlie Haas, who just returned from Germany where he had served eight years in prison for stabbing a man to death. The Hells Angels were angry at Grondalski for still wearing his Hells Angels tattoos despite having left the club "in bad standing".

== The massacre ==
At 10:23 am on October 5, 1986, Billy purchased some fishing gear and light bulbs from a Payless store and then returned home. The purchased products were found in his car by the police. Lester and Diaz arrived at Grondalski house shortly after he returned home. Lester pointed a .45 pistol at Billy and claimed that the gun accidentally went off. Billy took a bullet straight though the head, killing him instantly in his kitchen.

Lester and Diaz then decided to kill the entire family to silence any witnesses. Patty screamed and raised her arms. A bullet went through her arm and into her chest. As she attempted to flee bleeding into the hallway, she was shot down and killed. Jeremy raced to protect his five-year-old half-sister, Dallas, and was likewise shot down. As Dallas Grondalski held on to her favorite toy, a Matchbox car, and screamed, Diaz pulled out a knife and stabbed her. He grabbed Dallas by her ponytail and stabbed her in the ear, her cheek, her neck and finally severed her spinal cord. As Dallas was still alive, Lester complained "this is taking too long" and shot her dead. Diaz and Lester cut off Billy's Hells Angels tattoos.

Afterwards, Lester and Diaz returned the truck to Tankersley and causally told him that they had just killed the entire family. Tankersley along with Lester's wife, Sammie Lester, used a blowtorch to melt down the guns used in the murders. Sammie Lester and Tankersley were ordered to burn down the Grondalski house, but could not bear to see the sight of the murdered family and aborted their mission. Lester went to the RV of another Hells Angel associate, Dick Roach. Roach's wife, Mary Anne, was a woman whom it was said was "so tough she'd be a Hells Angel if she had a dick". Lester soaked his hands and arms in coffee brewed by Mary Anne Roach to remove gunpowder residue. Mary Anne assisted with the clean-up by asking a Hells Angels associate who ran a port-a-potty business to flush the severed skin that had Billy Grondalski's Hells Angels tattoos. Mary Anne Roach burned the skin in a barrel and then had the ashes flushed out. Another Hells Angels, Charles Haas, who just been released from a prison in Germany, was sent to Fort Bragg to burn down the Grondalski house. Haas soaked the house in gasoline and set a fire with a gasoline-soaked rag and a set of matches. The fire incinerated the corpse of Billy and Patty, but the corpses of Jeremy and Dallas largely escaped the fire.

== The investigation ==
On October 6, 1986, Detective Sergeant Philp Pintane of the Mendocino County police department received a phone call that a house in Fort Bragg had been burned down and the family inside had been the victims of homicide. Pintane told the Canadian journalists Julian Sher and William Marsden in 2005: "It's the case that will never go away. You can't help thinking of Dallas". Debbie Kast told the police that she had no doubt that it was the Angels who killed her sister. Because the house had been burned done on Monday, October 6, 1986, the police long assumed that the murders had taken place that day and all of the Hells Angels had alibis for where they were that day. A neighbor told the police that she had seen Patty Grondalski washing dishes in her kitchen on the evening of October 5, 1986. Haas had a burn scar on his hand, but he claimed it was because of an accident.

Pintane, who took charge of the case in 1988, interviewed witnesses, but failed to find any leads. In 1993, Haas was convicted of drug possession with the intention to sell in Arizona. Facing 30 years in prison, Haas had his sister contact the Mendocino police to say he had some information about "a murder", which he was willing to trade for a reduced sentence. Pintane went to Arizona to meet Haas, whom he described as an unruly giant of a man. For the first hour, Haas revealed nothing of value about the Grondalski murders while he kept demanding a shorter prison sentence. When Pintane told him that he would be returning to California as he provided no information of value, Haas mockingly told him: "You do know these murders happened on a Sunday, don't you? You didn't know, did you? How could you not know? With a pathologist and all that, you couldn't tell?" Intrigued, Pintane spoke with Susan Massini, the district attorney of Mendocino county, who agreed that if Haas turned state's evidence, she would press the Arizona authorities to reduce his sentence. In June 1994, a deal was struck and Pintane returned to Arizona to record Haas's statement.

Pintane told Sher and Marsden: "We had no evidence at that time that the murder had occurred on Sunday other than his statement." Pintane started to review the evidence and re-interviewed various witnesses. Pintane learned that Lester and Diaz had borrowed a truck on October 5, 1986, to go to Fort Bragg, which was tentative evidence in support of Haas's statement. Pintane further noted that Dallas Grondalski did not show up for school on Monday, October 6, 1986, with no explanation provided by her parents to the school. He also noted that the fishing gear and the boxes of light bulbs that Billy Grondalski had purchased on the morning of Sunday, October 5, 1986, was found still in the back of his car on the next day, which he suggested he never had a chance to take the fishing gear and lightbulbs into his house, which supported the date of October 5, 1986 as the time of the murders. Finally, he noted that on Sunday two phone calls from made from the Grondalski house to a Hells Angel leader, which seemed odd given that Billy had moved to Fort Bragg to escape the Angels, which led Pintane to deduce that it must had been the killers that made the calls.

Pinate interviewed the neighbor who said she saw Patty washing dishes on Sunday evening, who admitted that her memory had failed her, and she had not seen Patty that day at all. In May 1995, Pintane arrested Lester and Diaz on charges of first-degree murder. On 8 May 1995, David Eyster, the county's supervising deputy district attorney told the media: 'It would be fair to say members of the Hell's Angels have been less than candid and cooperative with us. They are relying on their code of silence and have certainly not been of full assistance."

== Trials ==
Fritz Clapp, a lawyer for the Hells Angels, intervened in the case to ask that the name of the Hells Angels not be mentioned under the grounds that killing a five-year old girl was damaging to their reputations. The judge dismissed his motion. The state of California had as its star witness, Haas, a man who been convicted of murder in Germany, whom Pintane admitted was an unsavory and unlikable witness. At a preliminary hearing in late 1995, the judge ruled there was enough evidence to bring Lester to trial, but not Diaz. Massini told Sher and Marsden: "We had to put it back together".

Tankersley, the witness who might corroborate Haas's testimony, was missing. Tankersley had been expelled from the Angels and fled in terror of his life back to his native Arkansas. Through the phone records of Tankersley's girlfriend, Pintane tracked him down to the small town in rural Arkansas where he had fled to. Tankersley attempted to resist arrest by the county sheriff and two of his deputies, and ended up being shot. Tankersley who believed that the sheriff and his deputies were Hells Angels in disguise cried hysterically and begged for his life, and was much relieved that he discovered the men who had shot him were not Hells Angels. Pintane flew out to Arkansas to press Tankersley to turn state's evidence. Tankersley at first followed the outlaw biker code and refused to testify against his biker "brothers" despite the fact he was no longer a Hells Angel. Pintane then revealed to him that the lawyers for the Hells Angels were accusing him of killing the Grondalski family, which shocked Tankersley to such an extent that he agreed to turn's state's evidence.

With the evidence provided by Tankersley, Massini was able to indict Diaz for first-degree murder. In July 1996, a judge dismissed Massini's motion to try both men together for the murders of the family, and insisted on separate trials. The first to be tried was Lester, who had a strong legal team paid for by the Hells Angels headed by Norman Vroman while an inexperienced junior assistant DA represented the DA's office. The case ended with a hung jury in April 1997 with eight jurors voting to convict and four to acquit. After the mistrial, Pintane confronted Massini in her office and told her: "We need to have another trial. Susan, you have to do this". Massini at first was willing to accept the mistrial, but finally decided to prosecute Lester herself after Pintane had shown her photographs of Dallas's corpse. Massini stated that the principle problem with the first trial was several jurors could not believe that the Hells Angels would kill a man for not removing his Hells Angel tattoos, which seemed a trivial and trite motive for such a serious crime. Massini told Sher and Marsden: "When you think of it, to an average person that's just the dumbest thing they ever heard of. For the Hells Angels, it was a real thing. Someone wearing a tattoo they're not supposed to is a real problem. You can get killed over it'.

At the second trial for Lester, which began later in May 1997, Massini made much about the way that Hells Angels had frequently burned off or ripped off the tattoos of former members who had refused to remove them. Massini noted that one juror, an young woman wore T-shirts with Harley-Davidson motorcycles, which she thought indicated sympathy for the Hells Angels. The second trial again ended with a hung jury with only the young woman with the Harley-Davidson T-shirts voting to acquit while the other eleven jurors voted to convict. At the third trial for Lester in October and November 1997 ended with him being convicted of first-degree murder and sentenced to life imprisonment. Lester laughed as the verdict was announced as he seemed to find the prospect of life imprisonment very amusing. When Lester was sentenced to life imprisonment, the courtroom broke out in applause.

In November 1998, Vroman, the lawyer for Lester and Diaz, was elected district attorney of Mendocinco. Vroman had often spoke of his belief of the innocence of Diaz and Lester, which he portrayed as an act of persecution. The trial for Diaz was set to begin in January 1999. Believing that Vroman was drop the charges, Massini asked the judge to stay the charges for Diaz on her last day in office in January 1999. Massini stated: "It was a horrible day. It was my last day in office in a job I loved. Diaz was there looking at me. It was horrible". Pintane took up a legal loophole under a California law under which a state prosecutor is allowed to take over a case if there is a perceived conflict of interest between the county district attorney and the accused. At Pintane's request, Michael O'Reilly, the assistant district attorney of California, launched a review for the state of California to take over the Diaz case. O'Reilly argued that since Vroman had been the lawyer for Diaz, there was a perceived conflict of interest and his motion for the state to take over the case was granted. In early 2000, O'Reilly had a grand jury indict Diaz for first-degree murder. Various legal troubles ensured as three successive judges for the case were disqualified or stepped aside for sundry reasons.

The case finally began on March 4, 2004. Charged alongside Diaz were Mary Anne Roach on charges of obstruction of justice and threatening witnesses; Sammie Lester for the obstruction of justice; and Robert Huffman for providing the van used in the arson. The defense filed for a mistrial on the first day of the trial because relatives of Patty Grondalski had shown up in court wearing T-shirts reading "Justice for Dallas". The defense lawyers fought hard to keep the name of the Hells Angels being mentioned in the trial, leading O'Reilly to tell the jury at one point: "There's this rotten, idiotic, stupid ethic of the Hells Angels that permeate everything about this case". Anthony Tait, an informer for the FBI, testified for the prosecution that Grondalski had left the Hells Angels in 1986 "in bad standing" and the other Angels were angry he had not removed his tattoos. Tim McKinley, a retired FBI agent, testified as an expert witness, that the Hells Angels cannot stand the thought of someone not a member of their club wearing one of their tattoos and will use extreme violence in such cases. O'Reilly told the jury: "It was the HA culture that really was the driving force behind these murders. The Vallejo chapter was in danger of having their charter pulled because they were not able to take care of HA business. They had to show the rest of the club that they could discipline their members". The defense lawyers argued that Diaz was a kind, loving man who would never murder a child.

Towards the end of the trial, O'Reilly showed the jury photographs of Dallas's corpse, which shocked the courtroom into silence. Yvonne Pintane, the wife of Phil Pintane, had often been angry with her husband for the amount of time he devoted to the case. She was in the courtroom that day and as she looked at the photograph of the corpse of Dallas Grondalski: "All those years that I missed with Phil, it was made up for right then and there. The whole thing was worth it now". On May 5, 2004, the jury announced its verdict that Diaz was guilty of four counts of first degree murder. Diaz was furious at the verdict and screamed abuse at the jury.

Pintane told Sher and Marsden that he was well pleased that not only were Diaz and Lester brought to justice, but that the case had exposed the Hells Angels as a criminal organization that posed as a motorcycle club. Pintane stated: "Their whole organization was on trial because that's why a five year old and her family were murdered. This never would have happened if they didn't have these stupid club rules that make them so frickin' macho. It happened because of the Hells Angels. It's their job to get into trouble. It's their job to deal drugs. It's their job to kill people". The American scholar Jennifer Hedgecock described the Grondalski murders as a crime that made sense only in the world of outlaw bikers as she noted that the idea of murdering someone merely over the tattoos they were wearing "makes no sense" to anyone who was not an outlaw biker, and the murder of a five-year-old girl "makes less sense".

== See also ==
- Careaga family murders
