= Bandidos MC criminal allegations and incidents in the United States =

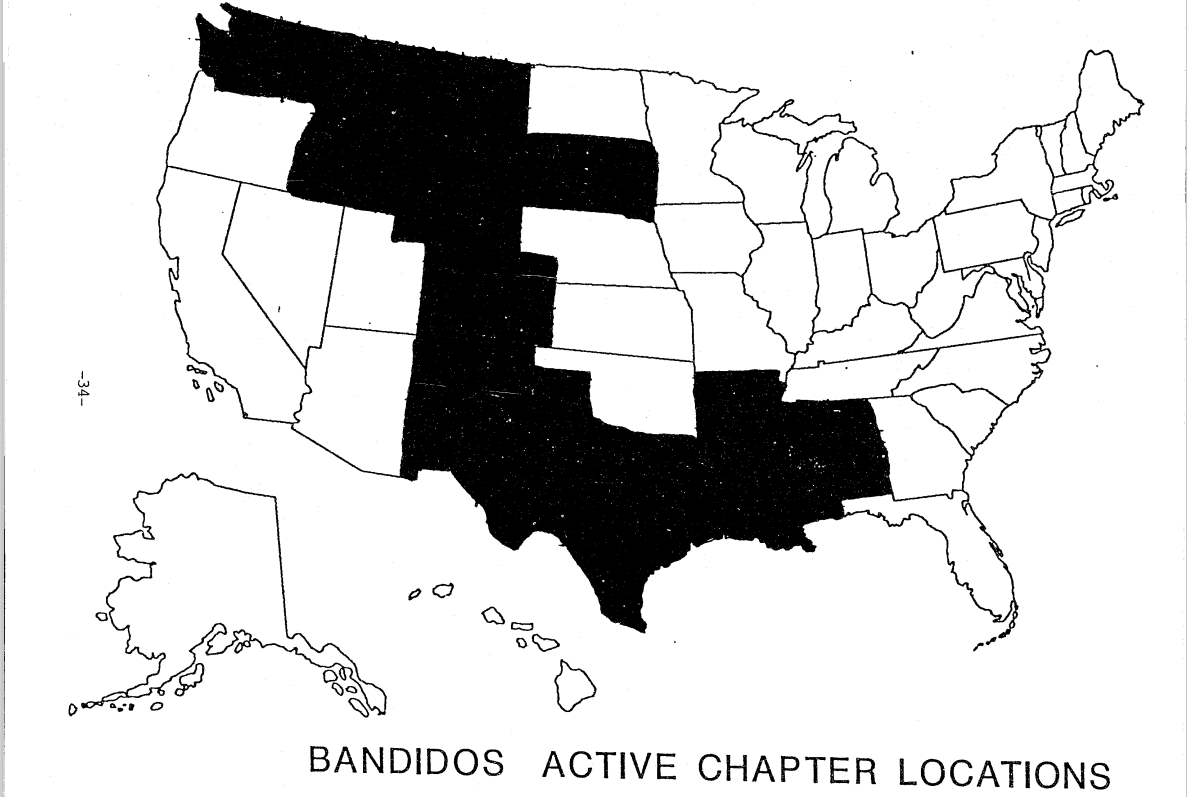
A map showing locations of Bandidos chapters in the United States circa 1999.

The Bandidos Motorcycle Club has been designated an outlaw motorcycle gang by the U.S. Department of Justice. The club is involved in drug trafficking, weapons trafficking, prostitution, money laundering, explosives violations, motorcycle and motorcycle-parts theft, intimidation, insurance fraud, kidnapping, robbery, theft, stolen property, counterfeiting, contraband smuggling, murder, bombings, extortion, arson and assault. The Bandidos partake in transporting and distributing cocaine and marijuana, and the production, transportation and distribution of methamphetamine. Active primarily in the Northwestern, Southeastern, Southwestern and the West Central regions, there are an estimated 800 to 1,000 Bandidos members and 93 chapters in 16 U.S. states.

Club membership is predominantly white and Hispanic. The Bandidos are supplied with drugs by Los Zetas, and have also associated with the Outlaws in criminal ventures. The Bandidos' rivals include the Cossacks, the Hells Angels, the Mongols the Kinfolk, and the Vagos.

== Arkansas ==
Twenty-two members and associates of the Bandidos were arrested in Little Rock on February 22, 1985, as part of a nationwide law enforcement operation against the club. Five of those arrested were charged under the Continuing Criminal Enterprise Statute, the first time the law had been used in Arkansas. An investigation into the Bandidos' involvement in drug trafficking began sixteen months earlier and involved the Federal Bureau of Investigation (FBI), Drug Enforcement Administration (DEA) and Bureau of Alcohol, Tobacco, Firearms and Explosives (ATF). A court-authorized wiretap was used at the Bandidos' Little Rock chapter clubhouse as part of the investigation.

Four Bandidos members from Texas – Isidro Savala Zerrata Jr., David Thomas Wood, Keith Allen Miller and Thomas Fisher Goodnight – were stabbed by Massachusetts Hells Angels members after an altercation broke out between the groups in a parking lot in Eureka Springs on July 29, 2007. Two of the Bandidos members were critically injured. In March 2009, Hells Angels members Jason David Gallo, Eric Claudio Franco, Robert Thomas Reynolds and Derek Jeffrey Roy were each sentenced to five year suspended prison sentences and fined $4,000 after pleading guilty to second-degree battery. Plea agreements were also reached for two other Hells Angels, Christopher Michael Sweeney and Manny R. Monteiro, who were unable to attend the hearing; Sweeney was in prison in New York on federal weapons charges, while Monteiro had been deported to Portugal.

== Colorado ==
Bandidos chapters have been established in Denver, Pueblo and Grand Junction. The Bandidos and their support clubs in Colorado are involved in producing and distributing methamphetamine at wholesale and retail levels, in addition to smuggling, transporting and distributing cocaine and marijuana.

Eight Bandidos members and associates in Colorado were indicted on September 13, 2011, on charges of trafficking methamphetamine and cocaine. Five of those – Keith P. Allison, Ronald C. Tenorio, Edward R. Goll, Adan C. Chavez and Tommy Freyta – were arrested during a series of raids in Denver, Golden, Rio Grande County and Thornton on September 27, 2011. A sixth man, Joseph P. Windsor, was already in custody, while another two remained at large. The indictments were related to a law enforcement operation against the Bandidos which resulted in drugs and firearms charges against a total of thirty-nine club members and associates in Colorado and Texas.

Three high-ranking Bandidos members were among eight people indicted by a Colorado grand jury in January 2015, accused of operating a drug trafficking ring in the Denver metropolitan area. The indictments followed Operation Tick and Flea Collar, an investigation that began in September 2014 and also led to the seizure of two-and-a-half pounds of methamphetamine. National sergeant-at-arms Philip Duran, Denver "Westside" chapter president Lorenzo Sojo, and the chapter sergeant-at-arms Michael Mensen pleaded guilty to violating the Colorado Organized Crime Control Act and felony drug charges. In November 2016, Sojo was sentenced to twenty years' imprisonment and Mensen to twenty-four years', but Duran escaped from custody on October 28, 2016, before his sentencing.

== Louisiana ==
The Bandidos have a strong presence in Louisiana. The club's Louisiana faction, which relies on Mexican drug cartels as its primary source of narcotics supply, distributes methamphetamine and, to a lesser extent, cocaine and marijuana, in the state. The Louisiana Bandidos have also been involved in stealing Harley-Davidson motorcycles and shipping them to various locations overseas.

Jimmy R. Graves, a member of the Bandidos' Dallas, Texas chapter, was sentenced to life in prison after pleading guilty in July 1972 to the March 9, 1972 contract killing of National Guard sergeant Charles Edwin Overfield, who was shot dead on Interstate 20 near the Texas state line. Overfield was a witness against Robert Powell, a Bandidos associate charged with the attempted burglary of a Louisiana National Guard armory. Powell was sentenced to thirty years in a state penitentiary for attempted aggravated burglary and bribery of a witness in the trial.

David Wall, identified by law enforcement as the president of the Bandidos in the Shreveport–Bossier City metropolitan area, was shot and killed with a shotgun outside a Bossier City lounge on September 5, 1974. A former club member was indicted in Wall's death but was never brought to trial because the only witness to the killing became a fugitive rather than testify.

In December 1979, Bandidos member William S. "Wheeler" Light was convicted of second-degree murder for the July 21, 1979 killing of off-duty police officer Ronald Euell "Ron" Dean, who was shot in the head at point-blank range through a car window outside a bar in Shreveport. Light was sentenced to life in prison.

Shreveport Bandidos members Lloyd Dale Randolph and James R. Shoemake were shot to death with a 9 mm caliber pistol by Dennis Baker as they beat him with an ax handle at his trailer home in Stonewall on June 1, 1986. Investigators ruled that the killings were self-defense. Randolph and Shoemake, a former Shreveport chapter president, went to Baker's home armed with two handguns and an ax handle to confront him after a dispute concerning the title to a motor vehicle.

The Vernon Parish Sheriff's Office began investigating an influx of motorcycle gang members and a subsequent turf war between the Bandidos and the Mongols in 2018. A joint investigation into the Bandidos and Los Solitarios motorcycle clubs by Fort Polk officials, and state and local law enforcement agencies, which followed an assault on members of the Mongols at a business in Vernon Parish on September 11, 2021, resulted in the arrests of James Larry Birdsong, Christopher William Moore and James Allen Snyder Jr. on various charges on October 7, 2021.

== Montana ==
The Missoula Bandidos chapter has allegedly been involved in an interstate drug distribution pipeline with the club's chapters in Gillette, Wyoming, Rapid City, South Dakota, and Denver, Colorado.

Bandidos member Joe Cancellare was imprisoned for his role in two assaults involving shotguns in Missoula in 1994.

Eleven Bandidos were arrested on May 27, 2003, after kidnapping and robbing Scott Spencer, a member of the rival Kinsmen Motorcycle Club, of his colors at gunpoint in Great Falls. A three-hour standoff ensued when an employee at Spencer's motorcycle repair shop alerted police.

Nine members of the Bandidos' Missoula chapter were among twenty-six club members and associates indicted on a variety of charges at the U.S. District Court for the Western District of Washington in Seattle, Washington on June 10, 2005, following a two-year investigation by the Bureau of Alcohol, Tobacco, Firearms and Explosives (ATF). Bikers were arrested during a series of raids in three Northwestern states, which resulted in the seizure of narcotics, firearms, U.S. currency, evidence of trafficking in stolen motorcycles and seventy marijuana plants. Missoula chapter president Bernard Russell Ortman was apprehended in Lubbock, Texas. Several Missoula Bandidos were charged with the kidnapping of an individual that took place in May 2003. In April 2006, Ortman and another chapter member, Dale Granmo, pleaded guilty to conspiracy to kidnap.

== New Mexico ==
The Bandidos are the most significant motorcycle gang involved in drug trafficking in New Mexico. The club maintains chapters in Albuquerque, Alamogordo, Las Cruces, Silver City and Roswell, and is also responsible for contract killing, extortion, welfare and bank fraud, and arson. The Bandidos have between 50 and 60 members in the state, with 25 or 30 of those based in Albuquerque.

Bandidos national president Jeffrey Fay Pike decided in 2011 to split the Bandidos' Western Hemisphere chapters from the club's international chapters in Europe and Australia, a move opposed by a faction in New Mexico and West Texas led by El Paso, Texas chapter president Ernest "Ernie" Morgas. During a meeting of around seventy club members in Roswell in March 2011, Pike loyalists ambushed Morgas' supporters. After being beaten with weapons and interrogated at gunpoint, Morgas and fifteen other members of the El Paso chapter were expelled from the club.

A turf war between the Bandidos and the Vagos emerged when the Vagos expanded into New Mexico from California. The first incident between the clubs involved an exchange of gunfire in April 2013, although no injuries were reported. On August 4, 2013, Bandidos sergeant-at-arms Japheth Seaman was fatally shot in the head during a gunfight at a fundraiser in North Valley. The violence erupted after Malichi Seaman, another Bandido and brother of Japheth Seaman, struck a man in the face with a collapsible baton. 72 shell casings were recovered from the crime scene by police. Malichi Seaman was charged with aggravated battery with a deadly weapon. Charges against Seaman were dropped due to a lack of evidence, in March 2015.

On March 28, 2015, members of the Wheels of Soul were holding a fundraising event at an Applebee's restaurant in northeast Albuquerque when Bandidos bikers arrived, prompting a fight between the clubs which spilled out into the restaurant's parking lot, where a Wheels of Soul member shot in the leg and wounded. No arrests were made following the incident, with police citing a lack of cooperation from witnesses.

Amidst a turf war between the clubs, Vagos member David Andrew Cordova and his son David Ray Cordova fired more than twenty rounds of ammunition at the home of a Bandidos member from a pickup truck in Santa Fe on July 29, 2017. The elder Cordova suffered a gunshot wound during the drive-by shooting.

Bandidos sergeant-at-arms Thomas "Mañana" Giles and club hangaround Michael John Vickery were arrested by the Federal Bureau of Investigation (FBI) in Albuquerque on October 19, 2017, during a raid in which more than twenty vehicles and trailers were seized. The arrests came as part of an investigation into the trafficking of methamphetamine, stolen firearms and stolen vehicles. Giles and Vickery allegedly sold heroin and methamphetamine to a confidential informant on four occasions between September 8 and September 29, 2017.

At least five instances of violence between the Bandidos and Mongols have taken place since the Mongols founded their first chapter in Albuquerque in 2019, resulting in two killings. On January 26, 2020, Bandidos "prospect" Patrick Alvarado was arrested in possession of a handgun shortly after Philip Quintel, who was "associated with" the Mongols according to prosecutors, was shot to death outside the KiMo Theatre in downtown Albuquerque. Alvarado was subsequently made a full member of the Bandidos. Although the investigation into the killing went dormant for over a year, Alvarado was charged with the murder of Quintel on February 9, 2023.

On May 26, 2023, three people were killed and five injured as a result of a shootout involving members of the Bandidos and the Waterdogs biker gang at the 41st annual Red River Memorial Day Motorcycle Rally in Red River. Between 400 and 500 Bandidos had traveled from Texas to attend the event. Two of those killed, Damian Breaux and Anthony Silva, were Bandidos, while the third victim, Randy Sanchez, was a member of the Waterdogs. The incident stemmed from an earlier altercation between the clubs in Albuquerque.

== Oklahoma ==
The Bandidos' first chapter in Oklahoma was established in Tulsa in May 1997, with Edward Winterhalder appointed as its founding president. The club also has a presence in Oklahoma City, Lawton, Shawnee, Elk City, Poteau and Bartlesville, and is involved in gunrunning, retail-level drug distribution and human trafficking, often in conjunction with Mexican drug cartels.

Fifteen people were arrested and charged with misdemeanor obstructing justice after members of the Bandidos and the Mongols were involved in a brawl in Shawnee on December 20, 2009. The fifteen Bandidos members, their wives and girlfriends sued the city and police of Shawnee in November 2010, alleging more than a dozen state law and constitutional rights violations.

== Texas ==
The Texas Department of Public Safety (DPS) classifies the Bandidos as a criminal street gang. As of 2008, Texas DPS estimated there were 672 club members in the state.

=== Early incidents ===
On December 22, 1972, Bandidos members Donald Eugene "Mother" Chambers, Jesse Fain "Injun" Deal and "Crazy" Ray Vincente abducted drug dealer brothers Marley Leon Tarver and Preston LeRay Tarver in El Paso and drove them into the desert north of the city. There, the two dealers were forced to dig their own graves, after which the bikers shot them with a shotgun and set fire to their bodies. Earlier that day, the brothers had sold baking soda to the Bandidos, claiming it was amphetamine. Chambers, Deal and Vincente were convicted of the murders, with testimony given by Robert Munnerlyn, a club prospect and police informant who was an eyewitness to the event. The trio received life sentences. Chambers, the Bandidos' founder and national president, was paroled in 1983 and retired from the club.

Bandidos members Gary Elsworth Lichtenwalter and Glen Alan Wilhelm assaulted Harris County Sheriff's Office deputy Rodney Scott Morgan at a bar in Houston on February 26, 1974. Wilhelm attempted to stab Morgan; the attack was stopped when Houston Police Department officer F. G. Todd drew his pistol. Morgan and Todd were working undercover, investigating a Bandidos member. Lichtenwalter was convicted of aggravated assault and sentenced to five years in prison.

Two seventeen-year-old girls were abducted at gunpoint from a San Antonio nightclub by three Bandidos members and taken to a motel room where two of the men beat and raped them on December 9, 1976. When police and motel security were called to investigate noise coming from the room, both men fled through a window. Charles Edward Tamminen, the Bandidos' national sergeant-at-arms, was apprehended as he fled. He was convicted of aggravated rape on March 14, 1981, and was given a ninety-nine-year prison sentence.

Steven Daniel "Trapper John" Vance, a member of the Ghost Riders Motorcycle Club, was shot and wounded with a shotgun in Dallas on July 9, 1977. A police report filed on the incident indicates that he told investigating officers that he had been shot by Bandidos. The Ghost Riders were initially formed as a Bandidos support club before drifting beyond the Bandidos' control and forming an alliance with the Banshees MC. On January 26, 1979, Vance pleaded guilty to the shotgun wounding of Bandidos member "Big" Jim Bagent and was sentenced to ten years' probation. He was also charged with another two shootings of Bandidos members; the wounding of Ronald Kim Tobin and his nephew Lloyd Tobin, and the killing of Johnny Ray Lightsey. Prosecutors did not ask for his indictments on those charges, however.

Members of the Bandidos were involved in a brawl with patrons of a chili cook-off in Grand Prairie in April 1978 after a young woman claimed she was raped by a Bandidos member. Seven people were hospitalized, some with stab wounds, and eight Bandidos members were arrested on charges ranging from rape to misdemeanor assault. Two were convicted; Ronald Kim Tobin was sentenced to eighteen years' imprisonment for rape, and "Weird" Larry Dale Sparks was sentenced to seven years' for stabbing. Tobin's sentence was overturned by judge Howard Fender in March 1979.

On August 27, 1978, Johnny Ray Lightsey, president of the Bandidos' Fort Worth chapter, was shot six times with a .38 caliber pistol as he waited at a traffic light on his motorcycle and died a short time later at a hospital. Later that day, two Banshees members were each shot twice with a high caliber weapon while riding their motorcycles on Interstate 45 north of Madisonville. Rodney Lee died of his wounds and James Harvey Cleveland was left in a critical condition. Before he died, Lee identified his attackers as three men in a tan Lincoln Continental and claimed that Bandidos had shot him. Aside from the Banshees, Fort Worth police who had allegedly threatened to kill Lightsey on a number of occasions, were also suspects in his murder. An enquiry carried out by a Tarrant County grand jury exonerated police and the district attorney's office in his murder. Ghost Riders member Steve "Trapper John" Vance was later charged with Lightsey's murder but was not indicted by a grand jury.

=== Shootings of James W. Kerr Jr. and John H. Wood Jr. ===
Bandidos members were implicated in the San Antonio shootings of Assistant U.S. Attorney James W. Kerr Jr., who survived an assassination attempt when nineteen shots were fired into his car on November 21, 1978, and U.S. district court judge John H. Wood Jr., who was killed with a shot from a high-powered rifle on May 29, 1979. Kerr identified three Bandidos as his possible assailants in a police line-up, while over a hundred club members were subpoenaed to appear before a federal grand jury in the Wood case. Rudolph James "Shakey" Malo, a Bandidos chapter president, was accused of pulling a .357 Magnum pistol on federal agents who raided his apartment on February 10, 1979, as part of the investigation.

The Bandidos were vindicated of Wood's murder when drug lord Jamiel Chagra pleaded guilty to hiring contract killer Charles Harrelson to assassinate the judge. Bandidos members were named by Chagra as the men he contracted to kill Kerr, although no one has ever been tried in that shooting.

=== Child pornography ===
In 2025, Bandidos member Andrew Moore was arrested on child pornography charges by Lamesa police.

=== Violent incidents ===
Two Bandidos – Thomas Lloyd "Hammer" Gerry and Jay Lane Roberts – were charged with the murder of fellow club member "Fat" Jan Colvin, who was found dead in a vacant lot in Irving in November 1978. Roberts was found guilty and sentenced to fifty-five years in prison. Additionally, Gerry and Roberts were among the suspects in the James Kerr shooting.

Bobby Joe Holt, president of the Galveston chapter of the Bandidos, was shot and killed on January 15, 1983. A companion, William Edward Gwaltney, suffered two shotgun wounds to the stomach and legs.

Bandidos member Steve "Panhead" Jonas was killed by a shotgun wound to the neck in a nightclub parking lot in San Antonio on July 17, 1983. Three days later, club members from across the country formed a funeral procession more than a mile in length on Interstate 10.

Antonio "Tony" Marquez, vice-president and sergeant-at-arms of the Bandidos' Kerrville chapter, was involved in an altercation with an unidentified man who arrived at the Bandidos' clubhouse armed with a knife on February 24, 2007. After disarming the individual, whom police were unable to trace, Marquez fired several shots from a pistol at the fleeing man. Marquez was convicted of attempted murder and sentenced to twenty-five years in prison in October 2008.

Bandidos member Benito "Chamuco" Lopez III was arrested on October 4, 2019, after authorities identified him as the caretaker of a stash house for illegal aliens in Los Ebanos. Lopez pleaded guilty to his role in a conspiracy to transport undocumented aliens on February 3, 2020, and was sentenced to six years and eight months in prison on February 2, 2021.

In April 2023, three Bandidos members were shot and killed in several locations along I-45 while traveling to a funeral in Oklahoma City. The funeral was the result of a deadly conflict that had occurred there earlier that month with the rival gang Homietos. The shootings were alleged by authorities to be a retaliatory attack stemming from a number of recent violent incidents between the two gangs.

=== Gang wars ===
==== Banshees ====
Bandidos member John Keith Bachelor was shot dead during a confrontation with members of the Banshees Motorcycle Club that also left four people hospitalized in Porter on April 30, 1983. The fight began after Bandidos ordered Banshees to remove their colors. Bandidos national president Ronald Jerome "Ronnie" Hodge ordered retaliation against the Banshees at a meeting of national officers in Houston on May 5, 1983, and club members subsequently organized plans to carry out bombings against their rivals. A team consisting of Joe Edward "Little Joe" Benavides, Crandle Phillip Lamonte Presnel, John Randal Hanson and Dale Lynn Brewer – president of the Cloverleaf chapter – planted bombs on a van and a home belonging to Banshees members, which detonated on July 5, 1983, causing property damage but no deaths or injuries. Twenty-three Bandidos were indicted on March 31, 1988, for their participation in the conspiracy, and on December 7, 1988, nine national officers and six local chapter officers of the Bandidos were found guilty of explosives violations. Hanson, Adams Otis Fisher and Raymond Douglas Shirley, president of the Longview chapter, served as government witnesses.

==== Cossacks ====
Jack Lewis, president of the Abilene chapter of the Bandidos, was charged with the November 2, 2013 stabbing of Timothy Shayne Satterwhite, a member of the Cossacks. Lewis was acquitted of aggravated assault with a deadly weapon in December 2015 after another Bandidos member, Wesley Mason, testified he had in fact stabbed Satterwhite and another Cossacks member in self-defense.

Around twenty Bandidos members ambushed members of three rival clubs – the Cossacks, Ghost Riders and Wino's Crew – at a bar in Fort Worth on December 12, 2014, resulting in Ghost Riders member Geoffrey Brady being shot dead and two others suffering injuries. The attack took place during a dispute concerning the Bandidos' taxing of smaller clubs for the right to wear a state bottom rocker. Bandidos members Howard Wayne "Drifter" Baker, Nicholas "Zombie" Povendo and Robert "Dobber" Stover were arrested in connection with the shooting. In June 2017, Baker was sentenced to forty-five years in prison after being convicted of engaging in organized crime and directing the activities of a street gang. The cases against Povendo and Stover were dismissed in August 2015 and October 2018, respectively.

Approximately ten Cossacks forced a Bandidos member off Interstate 35 at Lorena on March 22, 2015, and beat him with chains, batons and metal pipes before stealing his motorcycle. Later that day, Bandidos confronted a Cossack in Mingus and demanded that he remove the bottom rocker from his colors. When he refused, he was beaten with a hammer.

On May 17, 2015, the Bandidos were involved in a gun battle at a Twin Peaks restaurant parking lot in Waco that killed nine people and wounded eighteen. Among the dead was a member of the Bandidos and members of the Cossacks. As of January 2016, the incident remains under investigation, and it remains unclear who fired shots. There was heavy law enforcement present at the scene before any violence erupted, which leads to the belief that it might have been a set-up. Local bikers from many motorcycle clubs (amongst them many veterans and church bike groups) were present to attend a quarterly meeting of the Confederation of Clubs (COC) which had been established over twenty-five years earlier. Twin Peaks corporate executives later revoked the franchise permit in Waco (which also included a sister location in Killeen which was part of the same Twin Peaks franchise). As a result of the Twin Peaks brawl, three high-ranking members of the Bandidos MC (national vice-president John Portillo, national president Jeffrey Ray Pike, and sergeant-at-arms Justin Cole Forster), were taken into custody by the FBI between late December 2015 and January 2016. On May 17, 2018, Portillo and Pike were both convicted on a thirteen-count indictment of a range of charges, including racketeering, conspiracy, murder, extortion and drug dealing. On September 24, 2018, Portillo was sentenced to two consecutive life terms plus twenty years in prison without the possibility of parole. On September 26, Pike was sentenced to life in prison plus ten years without parole.

==== Los Traviesos ====
Three members of the Bandidos' El Paso chapter – president Juan Martinez, secretary Thomas Decarlo and sergeant-at-arms James Heredia – were charged with engaging in organized criminal activity-aggravated robbery after being accused of attacking and attempting to steal the colors of members of Los Traviesos Motorcycle Club in East El Paso on August 3, 2016. A man was injured after being hit on the head with a baseball bat and an extendable baton. Martinez died on August 3, 2017, after being shot in a fight with another motorcycle gang. The case against Decarlo ended in a mistrial in November 2017. In June 2021, charges against Decarlo, Heredia and Robert Farrell Grant III, sergeant-at-arms of the Bandidos support club Brass Knuckles MC, were dismissed by the El Paso County District Attorney's Office.

==== Kinfolk ====
Javier Gonzalez, vice-president of the Kinfolk's El Paso chapter, was sentenced to fifty-six years in prison in January 2019 after he was convicted of murdering Bandidos El Paso chapter president Juan "Compa" Martinez Jr., who was shot seven times on July 30, 2017, and died on August 3. Bandidos members Ballardo Salcido and Daniel Villalobos, and Organized Chaos MC (a Bandidos support club) vice-president Juan Miguel Vega-Rivera were also shot in what began as a bar brawl between the two groups. The Kinfolk were established in 2016 by former Bandidos members critical of the leadership of the club.

A Bandidos member suffered gunshot wounds to the leg and arm after members of the Bandidos and Kinfolk exchanged gunfire at a Lubbock bar on November 12, 2020. Bandidos member Alfredo Paez, and Kinfolk members Danny Lee Gollihugh and Michael Roberts were indicted on January 5, 2021, on charges of engaging in organized criminal activity. Lubbock Kinfolk chapter president Gollihugh pleaded guilty in July 2021 to possession of an unregistered NFA firearm, and was sentenced on November 4 to seven years in federal prison.

==== Mongols ====
The Bandidos and the Mongols were involved in a shootout that left one person – Alex Canales Villarreal – dead and three wounded at a bar in Midland on February 16, 2020.

==== Brothers East (B*EAST) ====
A February 2025 video in which the U.S. Department of Justice announces the indictments of 14 members and associates of the Bandidos Motorcycle Club

A 2025 federal indictment in the United States District Court for the Southern District of Texas accuses the Bandidos national leadership of issuing a "smash on site" order against Houston-based Brothers East (B*EAST) in 2019, beginning a war that has resulted in "gunfire exchanged on public roadways and in public establishments with innocent civilians present." The indictment accuses 14 members of the Bandidos (and the Mascareros support club) of crimes including murder and assault in aid of a racketeering enterprise, as well as drug and firearms related charges.

=== Drug trafficking ===
Numerous Bandidos members, including national secretary-treasurer William Jerry "Frio" Pruitt, were arrested on narcotics and weapons charges in Corpus Christi, Dallas, and Houston during a nationwide law enforcement operation against the club on February 22, 1985. Twelve arrests were reported in the Houston–Corpus Christi area, where the club's "mother chapter" is based. The operation, coordinated by the Justice Department and involving the Federal Bureau of Investigation (FBI), Drug Enforcement Administration (DEA) and Bureau of Alcohol, Tobacco, Firearms and Explosives (ATF), was at the time the largest ever conducted against a motorcycle gang and led to a total of eighty-two arrests in nine states. An investigation into the Bandidos' involvement in methamphetamine and PCP trafficking had commenced sixteen months prior.

Beginning in 1989, members of the Bandidos' San Antonio chapter were contracted by Daniel Nieto, a major distributor of marijuana between San Antonio and Saginaw, Michigan, in collecting payments from a number of customers in Michigan. On September 2, 1991, Bandidos members Ernest "Neto" Cortinas, Eric Wayne Green and Edward Salas carried out a drive-by shooting on the home of Forest Zudell, a delinquent debtor, in Mount Morris Township, Michigan, resulting in the death of a fourteen-year-old boy. The Zudell family were under the protection of the Outlaws and in order to prevent retaliation, the Bandidos obtained $25,000 from Nieto to pay the Outlaws in compensation. Nieto and several co-conspirators were arrested in May 1992, and Nieto and others plea bargained for reduced sentences in return for information and testimony against other members of the organization. He testified that the Bandidos eventually took over his business and that he acquiesced in the takeover as he feared for his life and the lives of his family. Cortinas and Green were among twenty-eight people indicted in January 1995 on charges of conspiracy with intent to distribute marijuana; all were found guilty.

Bandidos national sergeant-at-arms Thomas Lloyd "Hammer" Gerry began trafficking in drugs as early as 1989 and was imprisoned in the Texas Department of Criminal Justice from 1990 until he was paroled on January 5, 2005. Retired from the club, he again began dealing methamphetamine in 2007 and headed an organization with links to the Aryan Brotherhood and La Familia Michoacana which operated from Fort Worth until August 20, 2009, when nineteen members were indicted and arrested by the DEA. The drug ring is believed to have generated approximately $5 million. Gerry was sentenced to thirty years in prison and died on October 15, 2010, aged sixty-two.

Five Bandidos members – national president Charles Craig "Jaws" Johnston, national secretary-treasurer Terry Larque, San Antonio chapter president Ernest Cortinas, San Antonio chapter vice-president Richard Benavides and former international president James Lang – were convicted of conspiring to manufacture and distribute methamphetamine. In November 1998, Johnston, Larque, Benavides and Lang were sentenced to ten years' imprisonment, while Cortinas was sentenced to five years' because he urged his accomplices to accept a plea deal. The case began after the DEA raided a meth lab in Bexar County in October 1994, and expelled former Bandidos national officer Jay Lane Roberts assisted federal agents in linking the lab to the Bandidos. Roberts subsequently entered the Witness Protection Program. Johnston died at the age of seventy-two on January 27, 2020.

Houston police discovered approximately 660 grams of methamphetamine during a search of the home of Bandidos member David Gregory Smith on October 4, 2000. The search followed an eleven-month law enforcement investigation into the club. Smith was convicted of possession with intent to deliver the drugs, and was sentenced to thirty-seven years in prison in April 2002.

On September 26, 2011, three members of the Bandidos' San Antonio chapter – sergeant-at-arms Gerardo "Junior Ray" Gomez Jr, Jason Earl "Sarge" Morris and Angel Cevallos – were arrested by FBI agents and local authorities, and charged with possession with intent to distribute more than 500 grams of cocaine. The trio had previously engaged in a narcotics transaction with undercover agents. The following day, twenty-seven club members and associates were arrested in Dallas on charges of conspiracy to possess and to distribute heroin, methamphetamine and cocaine. One of those arrested was also charged with possession of a machine gun. Six others were arrested in Colorado and charged for trafficking methamphetamine and cocaine the same day. Another was arrested in San Francisco, California, while two remain at large. The Dallas charges followed of a multi-year investigation into the illicit distribution of drugs and firearms by the Bandidos MC and its affiliated support clubs. The operation involved the participation of the FBI, DEA, ATF, DPS and several local police departments.

=== Operation One Percenter ===
On March 27, 1986, several members of the Bandidos from southwest Texas were arrested as part of Operation One Percenter, a nationwide investigation into motorcycle gangs by the Bureau of Alcohol, Tobacco, Firearms and Explosives (ATF), charged with the arson of a tool company in Amarillo. Operation One Percenter resulted in the arrests of 53 members of 18 different biker gangs on various weapons and narcotics charges, during a series of raids in 18 U.S. states, and the seizure of 10 sawed-off shotguns, 10 machine guns, 63 rifles, 100 handguns, 4,500 rounds of ammunition, six silencers, a bomb, four hand grenades, five pounds of dynamite, 15 stolen vehicles, a stolen computer and a drug lab, as well as large quantities of cocaine, marijuana and PCP.

=== Murders ===
==== Roberto Lara ====
Frederick "Fast Fred" Cortez and Richard Steven "Scarface" Merla, two members of the Bandidos' Southwest San Antonio chapter, shot and killed Roberto Lara after luring him to a secluded area in Atascosa County in January 2002. Lara was murdered in retaliation after he killed Javier Negrete, another member of Cortez's and Merla's chapter, in a drive-by shooting in San Antonio on October 20, 2001. Cortez, a prospect at the time, was present during Negrete's murder and returned fire at Lara's vehicle. He was subsequently made a full-patch member. Merla was serving a forty-year prison sentence for the murder of boxer Robert Quiroga when he testified that he and Cortez killed Lara on the orders of Bandidos national vice-president John Xavier Portillo. In October 2016, Cortez pleaded guilty to murder in aid of racketeering; he was sentenced to thirteen years' imprisonment on October 2, 2018. Merla was sentenced to forty years' to run concurrently with his sentence for killing Quiroga. Portillo was sentenced to two consecutive life terms plus twenty years' on September 24, 2018, after being convicted on racketeering charges.

==== Robert Quiroga ====
Bandidos member Richard Merla was arrested in 2006 and pleaded no contest in 2007 to murdering Robert Quiroga, International Boxing Federation super flyweight champion between 1990 and 1993, on August 16, 2004. A dispute had arisen between Merla and Quiroga concerning a Scarface poster that Merla had illegally obtained from one of Quiroga's friends, and Merla stabbed Quiroga to death later that night. A passer-by on Interstate 10 found Quiroga lying next to his car, having been stabbed multiple times, and flagged down a police car. Merla was sentenced to forty years in prison. "I don't regret it. I don't have no remorse. I don't feel sorry for him and his family. I don't and I mean that" Merla admits. In regards to the murder of Robert Quiroga (who had celebrity status as an IBF champion around the San Antonio area where the local Bandidos chapter president John Portillo was one of his biggest fans), the Bandidos Motorcycle Club denounced any involvement in the crime, stating that Merla's actions were his own and not those of the club. Merla was expelled from the Bandidos due to his actions.

==== Anthony Benesh ====
In March 2006 police in Austin announced that the Bandidos were the prime suspects in the March 18, 2006, slaying of a forty-four-year-old local motorcyclist named Anthony Benesh. Benesh, who had been attempting to establish an Austin chapter of the Hells Angels, was shot in the head by an unseen sniper, as he was leaving a North Austin restaurant with his girlfriend and two children. Police said that Benesh was flanked by other people and the shooter used only one bullet, fired at a distance from a high-powered rifle. The murder occurred on the same weekend as the annual Bandidos MC "Birthday Party" in Southeast Texas, marking the 40th anniversary of the club's 1966 founding. According to police, in the days before his murder, Benesh had been receiving telephone calls from Bandidos telling him to stop wearing a vest that displayed Hells Angels patches.

On March 7, 2017, federal authorities announced that four members of the Bandidos gang had been arrested and charged with Benesh's murder.

== Washington ==
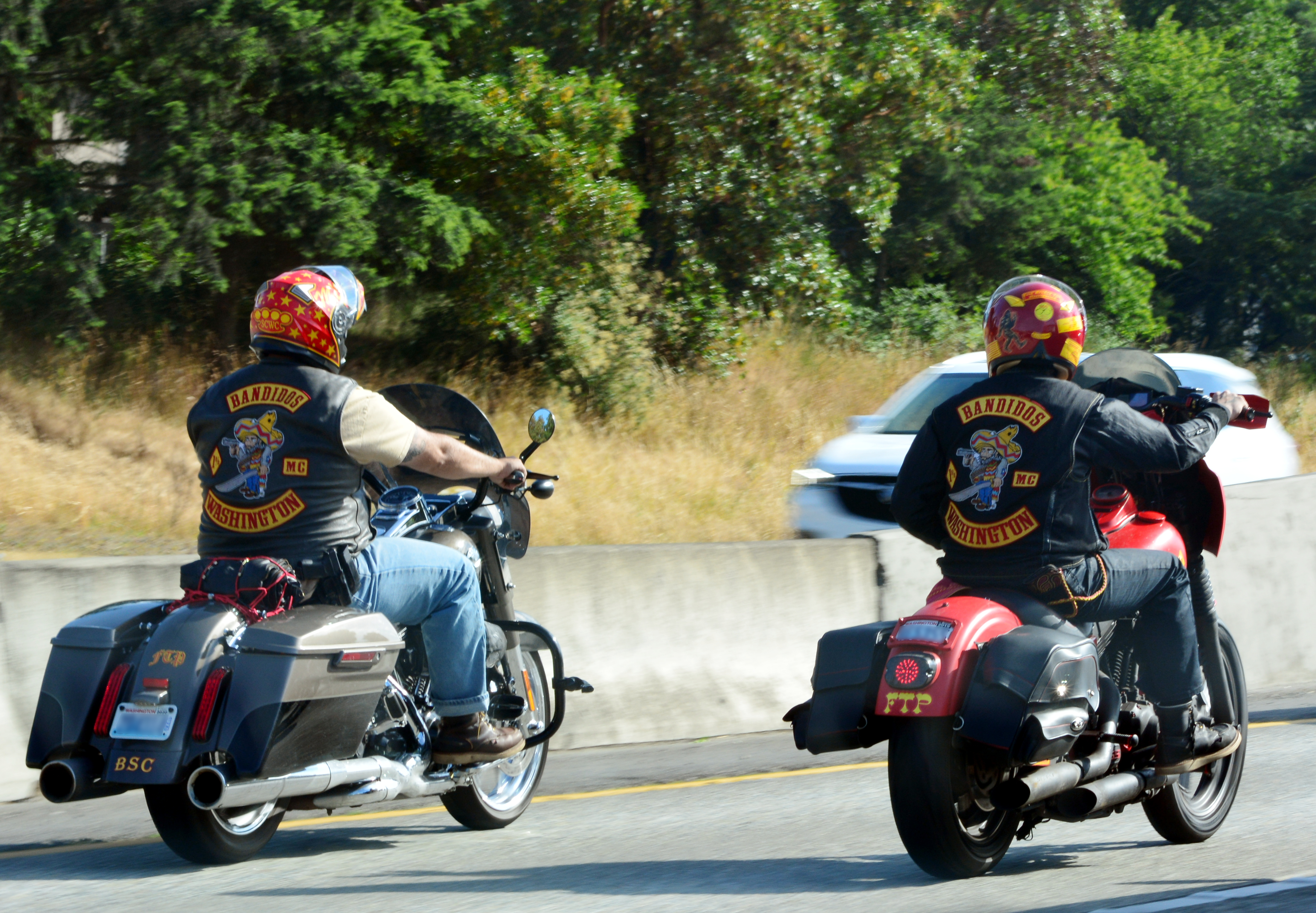
Two Bandidos headed south on Interstate 5 in Washington

There are fourteen Bandidos chapters in Washington. The club is involved in methamphetamine distribution and violent crime in the state.

As part of a nationwide law enforcement operation against the club, thirteen Bandidos members were arrested in Washington on drugs and weapons charges on February 22, 1985, eleven in Bellingham and two in Everett and Puyallup. Those arrested included club officers Jack Edward Sekora, George Irving Sherman and John Jerome Francis. The arrests followed a sixteen-month investigation of the Bandidos MC that involved the Federal Bureau of Investigation (FBI), Drug Enforcement Administration (DEA) and Bureau of Alcohol, Tobacco, Firearms and Explosives (ATF).

Bandidos sergeant-at-arms Frederick Entzel was killed another member, Dale Chandler, was wounded after Bandidos and members of the Iron Horsemen exchanged gunfire due to a drug dispute at a motorcycle rally near Zillah on June 18, 2000. Iron Horsemen member Darren Patrick Lumsden was also shot and left in critical condition. Chandler was charged with first-degree assault on Lumsden.

Thirty-two members and associates of the Bandidos' Bellingham and Missoula, Montana chapters were indicted in the U.S. District Court in Seattle on June 10, 2005, charged with conspiracy to commit murder, witness tampering, violent crime in aid of racketeering, and drug and weapons offenses. Several weapons, including firearms and knives, methamphetamine, marijuana, stolen motorcycles and motor vehicle parts, and over $25,000 in cash were seized during subsequent raids and arrests, which resulted from a two-year investigation into a variety of criminal activity by the club. Eighteen of those charged pleaded guilty, including international president George Wegers, Bellingham chapter president Glenn Merrit and Missoula chapter president Bernard Ortman. In October 2006, Wegers reached an unusual plea agreement through representation by his attorney Jeffrey A. Lustick, under which he received twenty-two months' credit for time served and three years on supervised release. Despite this being a felony conviction, the plea agreement accepted by judge John C. Coughenour allowed Wegers to continue to participate in Bandidos events, associate with known felons, and travel worldwide with court permission. No RICO forfeitures were imposed by the court. Merritt received the longest prison term of those who pleaded guilty when he was sentenced to four years' for drug possession and trafficking in stolen property in November 2006. The others received sentences ranging from probation to thirty months in prison.

FBI and local police investigators announced in January 2020 their belief that Bandidos members and associates were involved in the January 27, 2017 murders of a family of four in Seabeck. Christale Careaga and her children Jonathon Higgins and Hunter Schaap were found shot dead in their burning home while Johnny Careaga was found shot and burned to death in a truck on a rural tree farm in Mason County two days later. Bandidos associate Danie Jay Kelly Jr. was previously named as a person of interest in the case. On Monday, June 5, 2022, Kelly, Robert Watson, and Johnny Wilson were arrested for the quadruple murder.

== See also ==
- Hells Angels MC criminal allegations and incidents in the United States
