= Solo Angeles =

Outlaw motorcycle club in Mexico

Solo Angeles CM
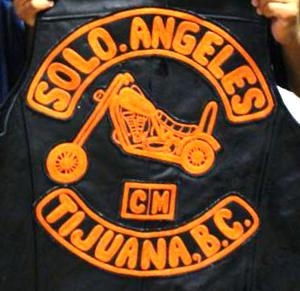
- Founded: 1959
- Founded at: Tijuana, Mexico
- Type: NON OUTLAW ONLY SOCIAL
- Region served: Mexico
- Website: www.soloangelescm.com

The Solo Angeles Club de Motociclistas (English: Solo Angels Motorcycle Club) are an outlaw motorcycle club that was formed in Tijuana, Mexico in 1959. The club's insignia is simply a chopper-style motorcycle. The club does an annual charity run where they deliver toys to poor children in Tijuana.

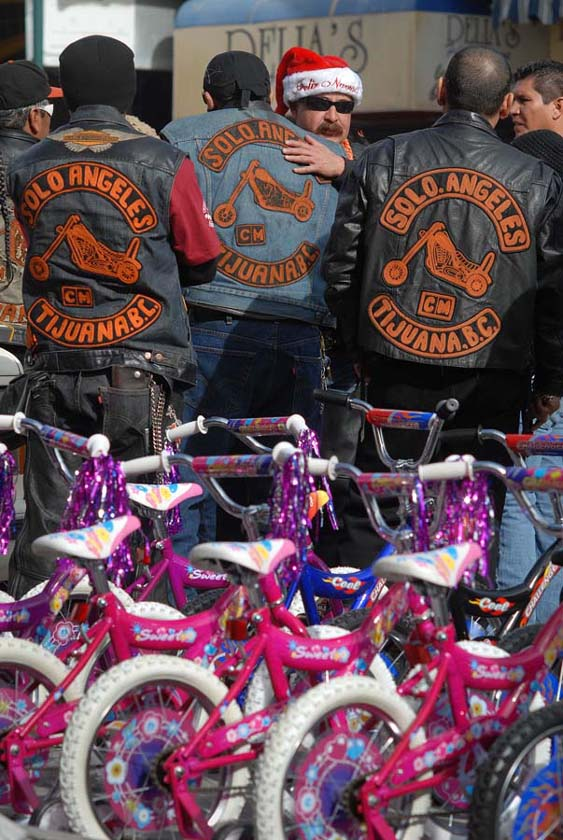
Razatoy – The Solo Angeles Tijuana toy run
