= Sons of Satan Motorcycle Club =

Outlaw motorcycle club affiliated with the Pagans MC

Sons of Satan Motorcycle Club, known locally as The Sons, is a one percenter outlaw motorcycle club and brother club for the Pagan's Motorcycle Club. It was founded in 1949 and incorporated in 1954 in Lancaster, Pennsylvania by returning World War II veterans. The club was eventually taken over by its namesake, John 'Satan' Marron, who later became the National President of the Pagan's Motorcycle Club. Marron is thought to be the one that converted The Sons from a fairly friendly, family-oriented club into a violent outlaw motorcycle gang.

== History ==
The Sons of Satan were originally the dominant motorcycle club in Central Pennsylvania, with over 100 members from Lancaster County and surrounding areas. During the 1960s, The Pagans began moving north into Central Pennsylvania which sparked a brief conflict between the two clubs. The conflict was resolved when Sons of Satan President John Marron and Pagans' President Fred 'Dutch' Burhans formally met and became close friends. Marron and a few select Sons members soon moved over to the Pagans while the remaining Sons were allowed to continue their club under Pagan oversight. Marron was later imprisoned after being convicted of maiming and homicide charges in the mid-1970s. Sons members wear a diamond shaped patch with the letter "P", as opposed to the traditional "1%" diamond patch. This is to signify their allegiance to the Pagans whilst retaining their outlaw status among the biker community. On December 13, 2002, the Sons of Satan clubhouse was destroyed by a pipe bomb explosion while the building was unattended. Although authorities believe it to be the work of rival motorcycle gang, the Hells Angels, the case has yet to be officially solved. After the local zoning commission attempted multiple times to deny and delay issuing permits, the clubhouse was eventually rebuilt.
