= Careaga family murders =

2017 family murder in Washington, United States

- Location: Kitsap County, Washington, US
- Date: January 27, 2017- January 29, 2017 (Pacific Time Zone)
- Target: John Derek "Johnny" Careaga
- Attack type: First-degree murder, home invasion, arson
- Weapon: Firearm
- Victims: John Derek Careaga; Christale Lynn Careaga; Johnathon Felipe Higgins; Hunter Evan Schaap
- Motive: Financial dispute over narcotics
- Convicted: Danie Kelly, Robert Watson & Johnny Watson

The Careaga family murders refers to the quadruple homicide of a Washington stepfamily that occurred in January 2017.

== Careaga family ==
The Careaga family consisted of 43-year-old John Derek "Johnny" Careaga, 37-year-old Christale Lynn Careaga, 16-year-old Johnathon Felipe Higgins and 16-year-old Hunter Evan Schaap who all resided together at a home in Kitsap County, Washington. John and Christale had gotten married in 2009 – with the two teenagers coming from prior relationships the parents had been involved in.

The Careagas were the owners of Christale's Java Hut & Juanitos Taco Shop, a thriving Mexican restaurant in Bremerton, Washington.

== Murders ==
On January 27, 2017, Christale Careaga, Hunter Schaap and Johnathon Higgins were all shot and killed within their home before the residence was set ablaze. Exactly two days later, the charred corpse of Johnny Careaga was uncovered in his light-duty truck off a remote road at a forest plantation in Mason County where he had been gunned down and torched.

On the night of the murders, Christale Careaga reportedly had some friends over at the residence. Meanwhile, Johnny Careaga received a phone call while at the house and went out to meet someone, telling the family that he would return home shortly. Johnny later returned to the premises, but did not enter the house. One of the guests at the Careaga residence went to the garage to check up on him, only to hear three men talking in loud voices.

As the killings were taking place, police in Bremerton, Washington received a phone call from Hunter Schaap who informed 9-1-1 emergency dispatchers that he and his family had been shot and begging them to hurry over to the house. The phone line subsequently went dead and Hunter was smothered with a pillow before being fatally shot in his head. When responders later arrived at the Careaga home, they found the residential premises burning down in flames with the bodies of Christale, Hunter and Johnathon – all lifeless.

A few days later on January 29, Johnny Careaga was discovered dead within his burnt-out Ford F150 pickup truck on an abandoned remote tree farm in Mason County, Belfair, Washington. A property caretaker of the farm told investigators that Johnny had been on the land lot earlier that day, only without his truck.

According to the Kitsap County Fire Marshal's Office, firelog (likely soaked with some type of fire accelerant) had been placed on the beds at opposite ends of the home after Christale, Hunter, and Johnathon had all died. Large rocks were then thrown through the house windows to fuel the flames.

When investigators examined the crime scene, they uncovered over $50,000 in cash stowed within a strongbox along with a money bag in the master bedroom containing $7,000.

== Motive and perpetrators ==
The quadruple homicide of the family-of-four is said to have been the result of a dispute between Johnny Careaga and the perpetrators over illicit drug sales as he was the apparent target of the attack. According to law enforcement investigative efforts, Johnny would regularly bring back a kilogram of cocaine from California every few months to sell for profit in Kitsap County, Washington.

Detectives from the Kitsap County Sheriff's Office, in conjunction with FBI special agents, have come to the conclusion that members and associates of the Bandidos Motorcycle Club had been involved in the slaying of the Careaga family. The Bandidos MC are a self-proclaimed "one-percenter" outlaw motorcycle club with a global presence who have had a longstanding history of involvement in organized crime as well as other unlawful activities including drug trafficking and murder. Some of the customers who bought cocaine from Johnny Careaga were members of the Bandidos MC.

One of Johnny Careaga's close friends started selling the cocaine he transported from California to Robert "Bobby" Watson III, a "fully-patched" (official) member of the Bandidos MC Bremerton chapter. It is unknown whether Watson had purchased the cocaine for his own personal use or to resell and profit off of. The friend of Johnny's eventually decided to put a stop to selling, placing Johnny into direct communication with Bobby Watson III as a subsequent result. When Johnny would end up taking his routine trip down to California after this incident, Watson would follow closely behind him – ultimately causing an intense verbal argument between both men.

=== Robert James Watson III ===
Bandidos MC Bellingham chapter Vice President Robert J. "Bobby" Watson III has been described as the alleged mastermind behind the slayings. When asked by fellow club members about his involvement in the Careaga family murders, Bobby Watson would reply with different and inconsistent responses. The President of the Bandidos Bellingham chapter condemned the crime and cooperated with law enforcement investigators expressing his disapproval towards any club member who would kill women and/or children.

=== Johnny James Watson ===
Bremerton resident Johnny J. Watson is the younger brother of Bobby Watson. Unlike his brother Bobby, however, Johnny Watson is not affiliated with the Bandidos Motorcycle Club.

=== Danie Jay Kelly Jr. ===
Danie J. Kelly was a "hang-around" associate of the Bandidos Motorcycle Club whose prospective membership was sponsored by Robert "Bobby" Watson III. He was seen in police surveillance footage wearing Bandidos MC supporter apparel. Kelly had once also had a close relationship with Johnny Careaga, even going so far as to serve as the best man at his first wedding. The two would later have a falling out, however, after Johnny accused Danie of stealing from him.

== Apprehension and trial ==
In response to the Careaga family murders, investigators assembled a task force to look into the quadruple homicide.

Each of the three perpetrators, whose identities were not initially publicized, were booked into the Kitsap County Jail. The arrestees were incarcerated on 16 different felony charges per person – among those being aggravated murder, arson and burglary. Danie Kelly, Robert Watson, and Johnny Watson all pled not guilty to alleged felony charges. A judge ordered that the trio were to be held without bail and were not to possess firearms, alcohol or drugs unless otherwise prescribed. Furthermore, the three assailants were forbidden to have any contact with one another – as also required by said judge. In April 2024, the men were found guilty of 30 charges, including first-degree murder, premeditated murder, and arson and on May 7, 2024, they were sentenced to life without parole.

== See also ==
- Bandidos MC criminal allegations and incidents
- Disappearance of Amy Billig
- Wonderland murders
- Farmville murders
