= Danny Wolfe =

Canadian gangster (1976–2010)

- Born: Daniel Richard Wolfe; June 24, 1976; Regina, Saskatchewan, Canada
- Died: January 4, 2010 (aged 33); Prince Albert, Saskatchewan, Canada
- Cause of death: Stabbing
- Known for: Co-founding Indian Posse gang
- Convictions: Murder, attempted murder
- Penalty: Life imprisonment

Details
- Victims: 2 killed; 3 others injured

Daniel Richard Wolfe (24 June 1976 – 4 January 2010) was a Canadian gangster who along with his brother Richard co-founded the Indian Posse street gang in 1988. Wolfe remained one of the leaders of the gang until his murder in 2010.

== Youth ==
Wolfe was born three months premature at the General Hospital in Regina, Saskatchewan, the son of Richard Wolfe Senior and Susan Creely. Both of his parents were Cree. His Cree name was Come Up Shouting At The Earth. In 1979, his parents moved to the North End of Winnipeg, where he grew up. Both of his parents were alcoholics, and Danny along with his older brother Richard Wolfe Jr. were essentially left to raise themselves. Creely drank during her pregnancy and Danny suffered from fetal alcohol spectrum disorder as his brain had been damaged in the womb by the alcohol in his mother's blood. Richard Wolfe Sr. abandoned his family, and the Wolfe brothers were left in the care of their mother. Creely attended a residential school from the age of 6 onward and was raped by her teacher, causing her to engage in heavy drinking from the age of 12 onward. In an interview, Creely defined her mothering as: "I just went to the party and got drunk. I didn't give a shit. I did that because I didn't have any love in my heart and I didn't have parenting skills. I lost that in the residential schools".

The Wolfe brothers were brought up amid "the howling chaos of the North End" where prostitution, drinking, drug use and violence on the streets were the norm. Carolyn Loeoppky, the principle at the Pinkham School in the 1980s, where Wolfe was educated, described the Wolfe brothers as quiet children who kept to themselves and rarely spoke in the classrooms, but possessed fierce passions under their quiet surfaces. Loeppky recalled: "They were enigmatic. They were hard to figure out, hard to reach, and suspicious about the purposes of others". Loepply stated she knew that Danny Wolfe was destined for an unhappy life as he was a small, undernourished boy with an unhealthy pale look. She added: "Behind that very quiet façade you thought there were all kinds of things going on in that boy's mind". The Wolfe brothers were frequently in trouble with their teachers, and Danny often accused his teachers of being racist, saying that they were biased against him for being Cree. When the Pinkham School held a fundraiser, sending out the children to sell chocolates, the Wolfe brothers along with all of the other First Nations children were excluded by the teachers under the grounds that they would steal the money. The Wolfe brothers along some of the other First Nations children raided the Pinkham school in the evening, and in an act of revenge trashed the school.

Susan Creely lived on welfare, and spent her welfare cheques on alcohol. To get away from the constant parties at their mother's apartment, the Wolfe brothers stayed out late. As the Wolfe brothers were usually hungry as their mother spent so much of her income on alcohol that she lacked the means to buy food, the Wolfe brothers raided the garbage bin at a local Kentucky Fried Chicken, looking for scraps of uneaten food. In the summertime, the Wolfe brothers raided the gardens kept by the Portuguese immigrants, stealing carrots and tomatoes. The Wolfe brothers soon moved on to smashing the windows of cars and taking any money they found to buy food. Danny Wolfe was known as an adventuresome boy who had no sense of fear. At the age of 8, he stole away on a freight train and ended up in northern Ontario before he was discovered. By the age of 10, Danny Wolfe was already an accomplished shop-lifter and stolen his first automobile. At the age of 12, Danny along his brother and some of their friends stole a van and drove out to Regina. Journalist Joe Friesen wrote about the Wolfe brothers: "By the time they were about ten or eleven years old, Danny and Richard were quite accustomed to raising themselves. They had no regard for conventional rules or morality. They saw themselves as survivors and were prepared to do whatever it took to make it". The Wolfe brothers were often placed "in care" and to escape the abuse ran away to live on the streets. In the spring of 1988, Danny saw his father living as a homeless man on the streets of Winnipeg. Danny had not seen his father for several years, and was heartbroken when his father said "hi" to him and then kept walking down the streets as his son did not matter to him.

== Indian Posse ==
In the summer of 1988, the Wolfe brothers founded the Indian Posse gang in the basement of the house that Susan Creely was renting on Beverley Street. Richard Wolfe Jr. described his brother as "a mischievous little guy" who was the first one in the Indian Posse to take up smoking cigarettes, the first one to drink alcohol, and the first one to smoke marijuana. The Wolfe brothers were part of a gang of thieves who called themselves Scammers Inc, but resenting the way that the older boys took the majority of the profits for themselves, the Wolfe brothers founded a new gang called the Indian Posse in August 1988. Both of the Wolfe brothers were greatly influenced by Afro-American gangsta rap, and the name Indian Posse was inspired by the rap songs they loved. The term Indian was often used in a derogatory sense in Manitoba and copying the way that rappers had used the term "nigga" in an attempt to turn a derogatory word into an affirmative one, the name Indian was chosen as the part of the gang's title. Much of the gang's symbolism and rules such as the choice of red bandannas as a sort of uniform were designed by Danny's friend Lynn. The most important rules were that the Indian Posse was only open to Indians and Metis with all other ethnicities excluded while in a nod to Cree traditions the gang was governed by a "circle" (council) of 5-10 people who made decisions by consensus. The structure of the Indian Posse with its three levels of membership, "hang-arounds", "strikers" and "full" members whose status were identified by their tattoos was copied from outlaw biker gangs.

The Wolfe brothers moved from breaking into automobiles into breaking into houses. Danny served as an apprentice thief to his older brother Richard. Danny's first criminal conviction was on 18 January 1989 at the age of 12 for a break and enter into a house. He was sentenced to a year in open custody. In 1990, the police raided Susan Creely's house and found numerous stolen stereo systems and televisions in the basement. Later that year, the Wolfe brothers started to sell drugs and worked as pimps as they forced their teenage classmates into prostitution. The Indian Posse catered to the most depraved sexual tastes and forced girls as young as 10 and 11 to work as child prostitutes despite the gang's rules which forbade pimping child prostitutes. In 1991, Danny started to date Crystal Simard, a 14-year old who already had a daughter. Collen Simard, Crystal's cousin recalled: "They were a sweet couple. Inseparable. They'd be just sitting there, their thin builds with matching long black hair and matching black clothes. Walking down the street you couldn't tell which was which". Collen Simard recalled Danny as a "sweet" young man who was always gentle towards Crystal and her daughter and was generous in supplying her with stolen jewelry as gifts. Simard described Wolfe as a "twisted Robin Hood" who stole from middle class white people to give to poor First Nations people. Another girlfriend recalled that Danny was a young man with "beautiful dark soul eyes" who would quietly break into her basement apartment to have sex with her without awakening her grandmother. She recalled that he was never violent and was always generous in supplying her with cash and stolen jewelry. The journalist Carleigh Baker noted the contrast between "...the gentle and loving young man raved about by his former girlfriends and the hardened thug running a prostitution ring of girls as young as 10. Richard and Danny's posturing on this topic – shame, remorse, and occasionally outright denial – doesn't change the fact that it made them a lot of money."

By the beginning of 1992, the brothers Wolfe had sufficient income to rent a house with a monthly rent of $866. Richard was considered to be the diplomat while Danny was considered to be the warrior. Though easygoing, Danny was known for his ungovernable rage. During his frequent stays at the Manitoba Youth Centre, Wolfe sold drugs and made allies. A pastor at the Youth Centre stated: "Danny was very impressionable. He didn't have the smarts Richard had". Danny served as the principle enforcer for the Indian Posse and was involved in 14 shootings between 1990 and 1994. Danny disliked drive-by shootings, which he considered to be cowardly, and much preferred walk-by shootings, which involved more risk and hence more courage. Danny had an obsession with his underworld reputation and always wanted to be seen as someone without fear. The precise number of people Danny killed remains unknown as his rivals followed the underworld code of never incriminating another criminal to the police and younger members of the Indian Posse usually confessed to the shootings that Danny committed to spare him prison time. The most notable of Wolfe's shootings were a shoot-out on the streets in 1993 with a rival gang called the Crips (no relation to the Los Angeles gang), which ended with Danny ambushing a van carrying some Crips and emptying his handgun while standing in the open, blasting away while showing no fear about the bullets flying around him.

Wolfe found himself frustrated at the lowly status of the Indian Posse in the underworld as the street drug dealers who took on the most risky and least profitable end of drug dealing, but the principle suppliers of drugs in Manitoba were the Asian crime syndicates and outlaw biker gangs who offloaded the responsibility and the risks of street dealing onto the Indian Posse. Wolfe lacked the international connections to have foreign drug suppliers sell to his gang directly, and instead had to purchase drugs from the Asian gangs or the biker gangs who inflated the prices and took none of the risks the Indian Posse had to take. Much to the dismay of the Wolfe brothers, the Indian Posse served as subcontractors to the outlaw biker gangs in Winnipeg such as los Bravos and the Spartans. Though the Hells Angels did not establish a chapter in Manitoba until December 2000, the Hells Angels national president Walter Stadnick was very active in Winnipeg from 1990 onward, playing off the los Bravos and the Spartans against each other, and selling both gangs drugs. Richard Wolfe later stated "Danny always hated bikers". Most Canadian outlaw biker gangs are virulently racist and have a whites-only admission policies, and Danny never disguised his disgust and dislike of the outlaw biker gangs, though it did not stop him from doing business with them if the need arouse or copying their tactics. Wolfe especially hated the openly racist Hells Angels who have a strict whites only admission policy; use Nazi symbols such as swastikas and the SS lightning bolt runes as their own; and who always treated the Indian Posse in a contemptuous manner. The archenemies of the Indian Posse was a Hells Angels-backed aboriginal gang, the Manitoba Warriors, whom the Indian Posse started to feud with in 1994. The Hells Angels courted both the Manitoba Warriors and the Indian Posse to serve as a puppet gang, and came to prefer the former over the latter as the Warriors proved more docile.

In July 1994, Danny escaped from the Manitoba Youth Centre, which led to his conviction for escaping lawful custody. Danny was sent to the Headingley Correctional Centre, which marked his first time in an adult prison. Though short and small, Danny was known as a ferocious fighter, and was frequently involved in prison brawls. Richard who was also serving a sentence at Headingley stated: "I saved a lot of foes from being killed at the hands of D-Boy [Danny]. We fucked up a lot of people". In December 1994, Danny was released from Headingley and resumed his criminal career on the streets. Both the Wolfe brothers adopted the fashion styles of gangsters in Los Angeles wearing baseball caps, checked jackets and Nike shoes.

== Leader ==
On 14 May 1995, Richard Wolfe impulsively shot a Polish immigrant and pizza deliveryman, Maciej Slawik, with his shotgun. The owner of Jumbo Pizza owed a drug debt to Richard and he decided to kill a Jumbo Pizza deliveryman to send a message to the owner. Danny was notably angry with his brother as he told him: "You fucking guy! You should've got somebody else to do that. We don't have to do that stuff no more". Danny threatened to kill several witnesses if they testified against his brother. In May 1995, Danny was charged with obstruction of justice and using a fireman in the commission of a crime as he threatened to kill a young couple if they testified against his brother. During his time in the Remand Centre, Danny led an extortion ring in the jail where he forced the other prisoners to pay him protection money or be beaten. Richard was convicted of attempted murder and sentenced to 19 years in prison. With Richard imprisoned, Danny became the sole leader of the gang.

As Danny was unable to make bail while awaiting trial, on 20 September 1995 he was sent to Stony Mountain penitentiary. A prison psychologist who interviewed him wrote: "He states that when he enters the Stony Mountain population, he will go and talk to other members of the gang and find out what they are doing (i.e. selling drugs, taking programs, etc). He states he will then do what he thinks is good for him and he does not care if the other members want to follow him or not". Wolfe only identified himself as being a "striker" in the gang, but his claims to have authority over other members led the prison authorities to doubt that he was just a mere "striker". After his conviction on the obstruction of justice charges, Wolfe remained at Stony Mountain. A prison psychologist, Richard Howes, who interviewed Wolfe on 6 October 1996 wrote that Wolfe "does seem to genuinely believe something healthy and enlightening can emerge from the gang. One might skeptically and perhaps realistically conclude that he is simply deluding himself if he believes this, but I was left with the sense that he is not committed to the gang simply because he prefers criminal associates". Wolfe told Howes "when it first started it was all crime", but he insisted that the Indian Posse was a social movement that promoted the spiritual well-being of First Nations peoples. Wolfe listed the encounter with his father in 1988, which was the last time that he saw him, as the moment that inspired him to found the Indian Posse. Wolfe stated that his father, homeless and drunk while wandering about looking for some discarded hairspray cans to drink from and begging for money, represented everything that he intended to reject. Wolfe stated "we had nothing" and the Indian Posse gave "a sense of strength in Aboriginal unity". The psychological tests done on Wolfe showed that he had above-average intelligence and had anti-social personality disorder. Wolfe was not classified as a psychopath, but it was stated that his substance abuse; long criminal record; comfort with criminality; unstable lifestyle and attention deficit disorder were all personality traits likely to ensure that he would reoffend if released.

In September 1997, Wolfe was released on parole. On 7 October 1997, four men robbed a drug house and during the police investigation, Wolfe was discovered on the front porch of a house nearby talking to several Indian Posse members while wearing Indian Posse colours. As Wolfe was violating his parole conditions by associating with gang members, he was sent back to prison. In April 1998, Wolfe was recorded making a phone call arranging to have drugs smuggled into Stony Mountain. On 22 April 1998, a team of Royal Canadian Mounted Police officers observed a man throw a baseball over the prison walls, which was picked up by Wolfe, but a subsequent searched failed to discover any drugs on him.

Sandra Woytowich, a prison official wrote that Wolfe was "a very pleasant and likeable young man" who was resourceful and intelligent, but committed to a criminal lifestyle. Wolfe who dropped out of school in grade 6 attended a prison program intended to allow him to finish high school. A First Nations elder who worked as a prison counsellor described Wolfe as a friendly prisoner who was very interested in Cree traditions and who gave the impression that he wanted to say something, but was unable to do so, owing to the presence of other Indian Posse members who were always around him. During his time in prison, Wolfe discovered poetry for the first time in his life. On 28 May 1998, Wolfe was released from prison and moved in with his mother who was now living on the Okanese reserve in Saskatchewan. Despite his promises to his parole officer to abandon criminality as a lifestyle, Wolfe had a tattoo with the words Indian Posse written across his back, which he showed he was now a "full" member. Wolfe did not find a job during his time in Saskatchewan and officially lived on welfare. He bragged constantly to anyone who would listen about the number of women he slept with while indulging himself in alcohol, ecstasy and marijuana abuse.

Wolfe's real job in Saskatchewan was to expand the gang by recruiting new members and Saskatchewan-whose population is 10% First Nations-was considered to be an idea place to expand into. The Indian Posse had about 1,000 members in Manitoba by the summer of 1998, and the ruling "circle" wanted a similar number of members in Saskatchewan. In July 1998, Wolfe went on a tour of reserves in northern Saskatchewan, especially in the Prince Albert area, recruiting for the Indian Posse. The Indian Posse preferred to sell drugs in remote reserves in northern Saskatchewan and Manitoba owing to the higher prices in those northern climates. A gram of cocaine that went for $100 in Winnipeg would sell for $1,000 on a remote northern reserve; while a gram of marijuana that sold for $10 in Winnipeg would sell for $70 on a northern reserve. Wolfe's tour was very successful as the unemployment rate was 80% on the northern reserves, and his image of assertive, macho masculinity coupled with the promise of great wealth tied to a Red Power message proved highly appealing. Glen Ross, the chief of the Opaskwayak Cree Nation in northern Manitoba, who tried to stop young men on his reserve from joining the Indian Posse commented: "There's pride in the outlaw, pride in fighting what they see as the government, the enemy". In a letter to Richard in August 1998, Wolfe wrote: "I made sure that our presence was there in Regina. We terrorized that place. Every bar we went to we got into some fights. But after a while they knew who we were".

During the summer of 1998, Wolfe met members of the American Indian Movement, and in his letters to Richard expressed the hope that the Indian Posse might become a social movement instead of a criminal organization. On 11 August 1998, Wolfe shoplifted some lug nuts from a Canadian Tire store in Regina and attacked a security guard with a tire iron when he tried to stop him. As a result, Wolfe was charged with armed robbery, assault with a deadly weapon and theft under $5,000. Wolfe served a short prison sentence and by September 1998 was a free man in Winnipeg. Wolfe resumed his career as a thief, and he always took along with him a loaded gun on his robberies. One former Indian Posse member recalled: "He loved his guns. There were several houses he shot up".

The Hells Angels had no chapters in Manitoba at the time, but were active in selling drugs in the Prairie provinces. Wolfe arranged to buy some cocaine from the Hells Angels, but decided to rob them instead. He put on his Indian Posse red bandanas and along with four other Indian Posse members stormed into the meeting with his guns drawn. Wolfe stole several thousand dollars, which led for the Angels to shoot up the houses of Indian Posse members in revenge. One former Indian Posse member recalled: "When things had to be done, he would walk into houses, break down doors, stick guns to people's heads. If you needed a vehicle, he'll go steal a vehicle or if we're down [short of money] he'll go make it up by doing a robbery or break and enter. If somebody got caught doing a deal and got caught with the product, Danny would repay those debts himself".

Despite the robbery, the Hells Angels approached Wolfe with the offer that the Angels would serve as wholesalers, selling the Indian Posse drugs that they would in turn would sell on the streets. Wolfe rejected the offer, saying the Indian Posse should be treated as equals to the Hells Angels, not subordinates. In a phone call that was recorded by prison officials in 2003, Wolfe was heard to say: "We just told them [the Hells Angels], 'Hey man, we won't fucking stand in front, we won't stand behind you'. We're going to stand side by side if we do this...They wanted control. We just said 'No'. And ever since then, we had to back them off."

In October 1998, Wolfe met at a bar a 19-year-old woman known as "Lisa" who recalled about him: "He had the long hair, the tattoos, the attitude". Lisa recalled of her four months courtship with Wolfe that the couple slept all day and stayed up all night while consuming massive amounts of alcohol and marijuana. Lisa stated of him: "He was the most amazing person I ever met in my life. He had a wicked sense of humour." In December 1998, Lisa discovered she was pregnant with his child, and when she went to tell him the news she learned he had just been arrested for armed robbery. Wolfe and some of his Indian Posse associates had kicked their way into a house and at gunpoint tied up the owners while ransacking the property. Wolfe tortured both the husband and wife to force them to reveal where they had hidden their cocaine. He was arrested leaving the property with a TV in his arms. On 16 March 1999, in a plea bargain with the Crown he admitted his guilt in exchange for a lesser prison sentence. Wolfe was sentenced to seven years in prison.

== Return to prison ==
The prospect of fatherhood seemed to make Wolfe a more responsible man and prison officials held out the hope that he would renounce his criminal lifestyle. In a letter to Lisa in April 1999, Wolfe wrote: "You know who I am and what I'm about, but that stuff has nothing to do with our relationship. It's something I can't change". In the summer of 1999, Wolfe became a father. Despite his promises to reform, Wolfe was active in smuggling drugs into Stony Mountain, selling cocaine, steroids, heroin, marijuana, and amphetamines. In August 1999, Wolfe was identified as a member of the Indian Posse's ruling "circle" for the first time. On 12 September 1999, he ordered the beating of another prisoner that resulted in the man going to the hospital to be treated for his injuries. As a punishment for all the trouble he was causing in Stony Mountain, he was placed in solitary confinement for months, where he obsessively wrote letters to Lisa and to his brother. In his letters to Richard, he sounded disenchanted with the Indian Posse, which he complained was divided by feuds and intrigue. Wolfe stated sharply that recruiting young people from broken homes imposed liabilities as wrote in his usual vulgar fashion that the principle problem with the gang was "too many fucked up people recruiting fucked up people". On 16 February 2000, Wolfe was transferred to the Saskatchewan Penitentiary as he was considered to be a trouble-maker at Stony Mountain. In a letter to Lisa, he wrote: "It's cold in these cells, like someone died in them. The House of Misery is what we call this place. There's someone getting it [stabbed or beaten] here everyday. Can't even shower without the pigs [guards] watching". Wolfe complained the prison was full of mice that crawled over him while he tried to sleep. In a letter to Lisa, he promised her: "I'm going to give our son something that I never had when I was small. A dad. I know how it is without a dad and it wasn't good". In another letter, he wrote "they say girls like bad guys more than good guys but I can say I'm the bad guy". In a letter to Richard, he wrote he had two girlfriends on the side and "I just hope my son's mom doesn't find out".

Wolfe was an ardent fan of the rapper Tupac Shakur, whose music he adored, and Shakur's Black Power rapping inspired Wolfe to try his hand at Red Power rapping. Like many other Red Power activists, Wolfe was greatly influenced by Black Power ideologies, which he mostly picked up via the rap songs that he loved. Wolfe detested Canada where he described in letters to Richard as an oppressive state and he made a point of always placing his stamps on his letters upside down to show his contempt for Canada. Alongside his contempt for Canada was a strong anti-white racism as he often wrote that he hated all white people. In one of his letters to his brother, Wolfe wrote: "I always put a stamp upside down. It's like, Canada Who? Canada Where? Fuck Canada! We were here first. Fuck their society. I say fuck the white people". Wolfe routinely used racial slurs in his letters to his brother as he asked Richard in one letter about prisons in eastern Canada "are there a lot of honkeys over that way or a lot of niggers?" In Wolfe's ideology, Canada was an illegal "settler colonist" state that occupied land that rightfully belonged to the First Nations peoples, and as such Canadian society itself was criminal to its very core while he was not bound by any of the laws of Canada. Wolfe did not see himself as a criminal, but rather as a heroic "street soldier" who was nobly resisting the criminal "settler colonist" Canadian state. The concept of the "street soldier" was central to Wolfe's ideology as he saw the world as a cruel, merciless place dominated by a Darwinian struggle for survival, and that Canadian society was so systematically racist that First Nations peoples needed "street soldiers" such as the Indian Posse to defend themselves.

In one of his poems written about a white man, Jeff Giles, killed while resisting an Indian Posse robbery in early 2000, Wolfe wrote: "Because I cause destruction To Your Society/With no sympathy/Fuck your public heroes/Giles who?/pump on his chest/As I sit here and laugh with mad with joy/He never knew the meaning of an AR". In another of his poems, Wolfe wrote: "Stop taking our rights/Stop taking our land/Stop taking our humanity/Stop taking our lives/Civilization is isolation/No tradition in urban cities/We trying to make it work/Hurt is all we feel and see/Pain is all we have". In the spring of 2000, Wolfe became the chairman of the Native Brotherhood Organization, which allowed him an important role in the prison life. Wolfe tried to resume his schooling with the aim of obtaining his high school diploma. He had an intense hatred of the Manitoba Warriors and when he learned that one of his cousins had joined the Warriors he wrote to Richard: "He went with the Warriors, so fuck him. Treat him like a bitch now". In May 2000, he was present when a Manitoba Warrior was stabbed, an action that he either committed himself or ordered, but he was not charged when the victim refused to testify against him.

In January 2001, Wolfe was returned to Stony Mountain, only to be expelled on 15 March 2001 as he became involved in a number of violent incidents with imprisoned members of the Manitoba Warriors, most notably a brawl in the prison washroom. Wolfe was angry about being returned to Saskatchewan Penitentiary as it meant no more visits with his son. Upon his return to Prince Albert, Wolfe became obsessed with The Sopranos TV show while showing an interest in First Nations spirituality. Wolfe also became interested in history and his cell was decorated with photographs of 19th century native leaders such as Big Bear, Crazy Horse, and Sitting Bull. Wolfe became very much interested in the Battle of Little Bighorn, where in 1876 a force of Lakota, under the leadership of Crazy Horse, annihilated the 7th Cavalry Regiment of United States Army cavalry, under the command of General George Armstrong Custer, as an example of First Nations resistance to white settlement. The Battle of Cut Knife in 1885 where a force of Cree warriors, under the command Poundmaker, defeated the Canadian militia and the North-West Mounted Police, under the command of Sir William Otter, which might have been a more apt battle for Wolfe, did not inspire the same level of interest in him because no Hollywood films had been made about that battle, unlike the Battle of Little Bighorn. Wolfe started to attend sweat lodges and expressed the wish to learn Cree. He expressed much anger when he learned that a First Nations elder who visited the prison to serve as a counsellor was instead receiving fellatio from the prisoners, leading Wolfe to complain "they're supposed to be helping us, not getting us to suck them off". Wolfe, committed to the image of being a "strong" warrior type, always denied that he was sexually abused as he insisted he was too strong to be abused. However, in one of his poems he wrote in prison he declared: "All I ask for is help/But no-one is there/For I have been abused/In all kinds of ways/I cry and hide my emotions/From everyone and everywhere/They beat me, they raped me/Burned me/That is only some of the things/They did to torture me".

In July 2001, Wolfe was the prime suspect behind the beating and stabbing of a prisoner who crossed the Indian Posse, but he was not charged. In 2001, Creeley stopped her substance abuse and drinking and started to work as a counsellor to troubled First Nations youth. She started to press for her sons to reform. Upon learning that he was going to be transferred to Renous prison in New Brunswick which had few Indian Posse members in a bid to curb his trouble-making, Wolfe tried to escape. In October 2001, Wolfe was transferred to the Atlantic Institution in Renous. As Wolfe, along with two others, were the only Indian Posse prisoners at the Atlantic Institution, he was frequently beaten up by the more numerous Manitoba Warriors imprisoned at the same institution. A Manitoba Warrior smashed Wolfe's head into the cement wall so violently that he had to be hospitalized. For his own protection, Wolfe was placed in segregation for six months. In April 2002, Wolfe was transferred to the Donnacona Institution outside of Quebec City. In 2003, he was moved to the Cowansville Institution. Wolfe received a letter from a woman who complained about the "pretty disgusting" way that the Indian Posse treated women who went on to tell him "you guys were great. These new guys are jerks...The seniors need to step in, show these new young guys the proper way of things!". From his cell, Wolfe ordered the murder of another Indian Posse member, Gene Malcom, who was shot in the head on 26 September 2003, but survived.

Despite his dislike of white people, at Cowansville, Wolfe became a protégé of Gerald Matticks, the leader of the West End Gang of Montreal. Matticks came from an Irish family in Montreal and had grown up in extreme poverty. As a man who came from a "minority within a minority" as Montreal has a French-Canadian majority while its substantial English-speaking minority is of mostly British extraction, Matticks had a similar sense of exclusion felt by Wolfe. Matticks is illiterate and Wolfe read and wrote letters for him. Wolfe wrote in a letter to his brother about Matticks: "running the fucking shit yet he couldn't read or write". Wolfe described Matticks as the most intelligent and ablest gangster he ever met. Matticks served as a surrogate father to Wolfe who recounted to him tales of how the West End Gang had fought off the Mafia to take control of the Port of Montreal. Under the influence of Matticks, Wolfe became a calmer man. From October 2003 to July 2004, there were no incidents involving Wolfe at prison, and in the spring of 2004 a prison official wrote about the "wholly different picture" of Wolfe who had become a model inmate. On 14 July 2004, Wolfe was released on parole due to good behavior. At the time of his release, Wolfe had $209 on his person and no drivers' license (he always failed his driving tests), no health card and no Indian status card.

Wolfe worked briefly as a part-time general labourer at Silverado Demolition in Regina, but resigned when a time conflict emerged with a course he was taking. Wolfe's parole officer, James Squire, wrote: "Daniel's overall attitude to the criminal justice system and conventional institutions was adversarial to say the least. He openly admits to having had an "Us versus Them" attitude towards the police and other such authority figures and generally saw society as being dominated by white systems governed by white rules that made the white richer and the Indian suffer...Daniel readily admits to feeling that he had no legitimate ways of making a living, so crime became a full time job as a means to attain food, clothing and a place to stay". Squire believed that a course Wolfe had taken in Cree religion in prison had helped him, and learning the "old ways" had made Wolfe into a better man. In October 2004, Wolfe moved in with his mother at the Okanese reserve. Creely as a reformed woman was determined to put a stop to Wolfe's substance abuse and wanted him to abide by his parole conditions. At Okanese, Wolfe worked as a rancher and his new parole officer, Sandra Lavalley, described him as a changed man who wanted to be a good father to his son. After a New Year's Party on 1 January 2005, Wolfe started to engage in substance abuse again to such an extent that his mother reported him to Lavalley. On 25 January 2005, Creely and Lavalley confronted Wolfe about his substance abuse and warned him that he would go back to prison if he did not seek help. Wolfe broke into in one of his usual rages and stated that he did not want to be treated like a child. Finally, Wolfe admitted that he had resumed his substance abuse, and promised to stop in exchange for not being sent back to prison. On 9 June 2005, Lavalley confronted Wolfe with evidence that he had broken his promise and started substance abuse again, along with evidence that he was having sex with a 15-year-old girl. Lavalley informed him that he would be going back to prison for his parole violations. Wolfe started that he needed to pack his possessions before returning to prison, but instead fled. After spending two weeks in hiding, Wolfe returned to Winnipeg. He did not seek to maintain contact with his 15 year old girlfriend, Shenoa, who was three months' pregnant with his child.

In his letters to his brother, Wolfe described Winnipeg as far worse than the city he had known as a child writing "it's crazy" as prostitution and drug abuse were more rampant than it had been in the 1980s-1990s. Wolfe was approached by Michael Sandham, the president of the Winnipeg chapter of the Bandidos with an offer to have the Indian Posse join the Bandidos, an offer that Wolfe rejected out of hand, not the least was because he did not want to be an outlaw biker and certainly not subordinate to Sandham. Wolfe resumed working as a drug dealer, but was brought down when his business partner was arrested, which led the police to him. In September 2005, Wolfe was sent back to Stony Mountain prison. The Indian Posse faction at Stony Mountain was riddled with intrigue and feuds. On 13 April 2004, one of the leaders held at Stony Mountain, Brad Maytwayashing, had been beaten up and expelled from the gang, an action that Wolfe had approved of. One of the Indian Posse leaders who had beaten Maywayashing was Sheldon McKay, a member of the ruling circle (council). As a teenager, McKay had killed his girlfriend's mother by slashing her throat and leaving her to bleed to death. In another incident shortly after his release from prison in 1999 McKay had beaten to death Adrian Bruyere, a member of a rival gang, the Nine-O's, by kicking in his head. Detective James Jewell of the Winnipeg police who had arrested McKay for Bruyere's murder called him the "personification of evil". McKay was an intriguer who sought total control of the Indian Posse and planned to eliminate the other leaders. Travis Personius, an Indian Posse member who served as McKay's bodyguard in prison recalled that McKay would strike his followers with his fists to show his power as he knew that they would never dare to strike back, saying of him: "He was an asshole". Kim, a First Nations woman who worked as a prison counsellor, described Wolfe as a much better behaved inmate than the usual Indian Posse prisoner, saying: "he was a very compassionate guy". Kim stated that despite their superficial friendship that there was much tension between McKay and Wolfe as McKay was jealous of Wolfe's popularity.

== The McKay murder ==
In April 2006, an inmate smuggled in a stash of painkillers, which McKay seized for himself, and then gave to another inmate when a search was ordered of his cell. Wolfe was able to obtain the pills and used all of them for himself, an act which greatly angered McKay. Wolfe contacted an Indian Posse member serving a life sentence at Stony Mountain to say it was necessary to have McKay killed before McKay had him killed. One Indian Posse member stated he was shocked by the way that Wolfe went in an instant from being warm and friendly to being cold and calculating as he stated: "Even though he's the nicest guy, he's fucking sinister. Even if you're his best friend he'll kill you". Wolfe along with a fellow Indian Posse founder Ray Armstrong went to see another Indian Posse leader, Jeffrey Bruyere, who was making a shiv (a homemade knife) and who agreed to join their plot. On the evening of 3 May 2006 while McKay was watching TV in his prison cell, a delegation of Indian Posse leaders consisting of Wolfe, Armstrong, Bruyere, Adrien Young and Raymond Chartrand entered the cell.

Wolfe asked McKay "What's up? So you think you're the man?" As McKay rose to confront them, Wolfe threw the first punch while Chartrand grabbed him from behind. After beating McKay up, Wolfe announced "this guy's not leaving this cell". He placed a white cloth around McKay's neck, and each took turns strangling McKay to death to ensure all were equally culpable. Personius observed that when Wolfe left the cell, he was holding the murder weapon as far as possible from himself. Wolfe and the others spent the rest of the night destroying any evidence that might incriminate them.

The next day the guards discovered McKay's corpse rotting in his cell, and ordered a lockdown. McKay's girlfriend had arrived at Stony Mountain for a conjugal visit and while she was undressing in the conjugal visit room, a guard went to McKay's cell to wake him up. As McKay remained in the bed, the guard was heard to shout "what the fuck, you dead or something?" As McKay remained still, the guard walked into the cell and was struck by the smell of the decomposing corpse. The Royal Canadian Mounted Police interviewed all of the prisoners, but was unable to obtain sufficient evidence to charge Wolfe, though he remained the prime suspect. Wolfe did not speak of the murder to anyone other than a brief comment to an undercover policeman that "the fucker deserved it" as he accused McKay of being power-hungry and stated he was "plotting against brothers, doing greasy things behind other people's backs and spending money from the kitty". The lockdown ended in July 2006 and Wolfe was released from prison in November 2006. Besides for traditional archenemies such as the Manitoba Warriors and the Native Syndicate, the Indian Posse was being challenged by two new Afro-Canadian gangs, the African Mafia and the Mad Cowz, which led Wolfe to argue that the Indian Posse needed a massive recruitment drive. After his release, Wolfe moved to Saskatchewan to recruit more members.

== Murder spree ==
Wolfe settled on the Okanese reserve in Saskatchewan which he used as a base to set up several new Indian Posse chapters on various reserves in the spring and summer of 2007. He lived in the basement of the house of his cousin Tatiana in a room decorated with pictures of rappers such as Dr. Dre and 50 Cent along with photographs of Indian Posse members arranged in the shape of the Indian Posse logo. In May 2007, he was arrested for marijuana possession and the use of a false ID. By the summer of 2007 Wolfe had recruited 400 new members into the Indian Posse. Despite his work as a recruiter for the Indian Posse, Wolfe with apparently no sense of irony, worked as an anti-gang counsellor at local high schools, where in exchange for a fee, he denounced his own gang. Because of an increase in crime on the Opaskwayak Cree reserve, the band elders asked for the Royal Canadian Mounted Police to build a new station on the reserve. While under construction, Wolfe had the station burned down twice. One of the arsonists, a Cree teenager known only as James due to a court order, later testified that Wolfe had told him not to worry about facing charges as he was underage and the police would forget about the arson within five years. Wolfe talked about sending James to Europe to buy heroin as he maintained that he had connections with the Triads (Chinese organized crime) who were willing to sell to the Indian Posse. By 2007, Wolfe was a tricenarian, which made him an old man by Indian Posse standards, and his leadership was being challenged by younger men, which made upholding his underworld reputation as the most dangerous Indian Posse member all the more important for him. In one of his letters, Wolfe complained that he was now the oldest member in the Indian Posse, but insisted: "I can still rock'n'roll like an young guy! Haha! Still pick up the honeys like crazy". One night in mid-September 2007, Wolfe, under the influence of alcohol, fired off a .22 rifle into the darkness from the front deck, leading to his neighbour, Ernest Tuckanow, to call the File Hills tribal police to say that he saw Wolfe blasting away at a tree, which had woken him up. Wolfe did not pick up the shell castings from his shooting exercise, which were later discovered by the Mounties.

On 20 September 2007, Danny Wolfe was involved in a verbal dispute in a bar in Fort Qu'Appelle with Bernard Percy Pascal, a member of the rival Native Syndicate. Wolfe was drinking at the Trapper's Bar when Pascal noticed that he had Indian Posse tattoos on his arm and went up to confront him, telling him that Fort Qu'Appelle belonged to the Native Syndicate and that he should leave. Wolfe took off one of his socks, placed a pool ball in it and used it as a weapon. Through Pascal had retreated, Wolfe's ego had been damaged by the insults he had taken in public, and he was full of desire for revenge. Wolfe had written down the license plate of Pascal's blue pick-up truck as he drove away. The bartender heard Wolfe say to someone on his cell phone: "They don't know what's coming for them". Wolfe went to his cousin's house where he borrowed her van and a gun. He called for his friend Gerrard Granbois and "James" to join him. After two hours cruising around Fort Qu'Appelle, he found Pascal's truck parked outside of the house at 302 Pasqua Avenue and parked the van a short distance away. The house at 302 Pasaqua Avenue belonged to a couple, Christina Cook and Marvin Arnault. Cook, known to everyone as "Granny", was a 63-year old First Nations woman who liked to take in troubled youth into her house as a way to prevent them from living on the street. A group of young people who were friends of her grandson were staying at her house that night, and one of them was Pascal. After getting out of the van, Wolfe used his red bandanna as a face mask and along with James headed towards Pascal's house. Wolfe broke into Pascal's house and started shooting everybody he saw.

Wolfe kicked in the door and shot Jesse Obey who was sitting on a couch. The bullet went through Obey's head and knocked out half of his teeth. Wofle then killed Michael Itittakoose who had come out from the bedroom to see what the noise was all about. Another present, Cordell Keepness, recalled: "I got shot in my right forearm and my left hand and my side. I just felt my arms getting hit. I just fell after that. I just fell on the bed and then rolled over and fell on the ground". The owner of the house, Christina Cook, picked up the telephone and someone was heard to shout: "Shoot the old lady, she's calling the cops!" As Wolfe aimed his rifle at her, Cook's husband, Marvin Arnault threw himself into the line of the fire to save his wife. As Arnault lay bleeding atop of his wife, he told her "I love you, eh, Chris?" Cook asked him "are you hurt, Marvin?' He answered by saying "I think so" and then died of blood loss.

At that point, Wolfe noticed Pascal, the man he had come to kill and lost interest in Cook. Wolfe shot Pascal three times, putting bullets though his shin, chest and testicles. Pascal recalled: "It hurt, I remember those two. And then the third one, it hit me in the balls. That's when I dropped down". As Pascal curled up in a ball, Wolfe continued to shoot him. Pascal recalled being in pain and seeing blood everywhere before he passed out. Wolfe put 9 bullets into Pascal's body. After running out of ammunition, Wolfe turned towards Cook and told her: "That'll teach 'em to mess with the IP". As he walked back to the van, Wolfe cursed "James" for freezing up and told him "I should just bury you". After getting into Granbois's van, Wolfe told him to drive away and causally said "we shot some people". Along the way, Wolfe had the van stop at a beer store to pick up some alcohol for him to drink when he got home. After arriving home, he burned his clothes and took a shower to wash away the gunpower residue. Wolfe killed Michael Itittakoose and Marvin Arnault while wounding Pascal, Jesse Obey and Cordell Keepness. Friesen describe Wolfe's shooting rampage as motivated by his ego as he could not stand any personal slights, real or imagined, and after Pascal insulted him in the bar felt that only swift and blinding violence could avenge the blow to his ego. Friesen wrote: "Danny couldn't allow himself to be disrespected in public; he had to respond with overwhelming force; that's what was expected of him. He had spent most of his adult life obsessed with reputation and status, and his world revolved around ego and pride. He had other options, of course, he could have walked away or he could have issued a beating. He chose the wrong path".

== Investigation ==
Constable Jan Lussier along with his wife, Constable Jill Lussier, of the Royal Canadian Mounted Police (RCMP) responded to reports of a shooting at 302 Pasqua Avenue at about 10:15 pm on 20 September 2007. The Lussiers found a scene of chaos with the house full of dead and wounded men, the walls and floors covered with blood, and women crying hysterically that their men were lost. Jan Lussier stated: "It was a pretty chaotic scene. Our number one thing was the safety of everyone involved. We only had one officer outside maintaining a perimeter for us. Our goal was to get as many people out of and away from the house as quick as possible". The witnesses were in such a state of shock that their speech was almost incoherent with the witnesses saying "some guy" had kicked his way in and started to shoot everyone. Corporal Robin Zentner of the RCMP's Major Crimes Unit in Regina arrived at about 2:00 am to take charge of the investigation. Zentner stated: "At the time we had no idea that Danny Wolfe was responsible. All we knew was that masked men came into the house and started shooting. They made references to the Indian Posse and ran out the door". The break for the detectives was the reference by the witnesses to the incident at the Trapper's Bar earlier that night. Constable Donna Zawislak looked over the security camera footage at the Trapper's Bar and recognized Wolfe as the man whom Pascal had the fight with. The RCMP quickly established that Wolfe was living on the Okanese reserve nearby. On 28 September 2007, Wolfe was arrested as his mother was driving him out to Regina. Wolfe gave the SIM cards from his two cell phones to his mother and told her to destroy them as he did not want the police to know whom he had been calling and texting. Wolfe was arrested for violating his parole by not meeting his parole officer.

The RCMP searched the house of Wolfe's cousin, Tatiana Buffalocalf, where Wolfe was living. The RCMP failed to find the murder weapon, but found shell castings near the front deck that matched those of the murder weapon. In November 2007, the RCMP arrested Granbois. Granbois agreed to turn Crown's evidence and testify against Wolfe in exchange for immunity. The RCMP found the van of Tatiana Buffalocalf abandoned on a remote rural road and in the van were found two shell castings that matched those found at the murder scene and at Buffalocalf's house. From his prison cell, Wolfe felt that the teenager "James" would be not tried as an adult, but he was still concerned about the possibility that "James" would turn Crown's evidence, which led him to order his beating to ensure his silence. Wolfe expressed concern that he might not see his children again, which was the closest he ever came to expressing remorse for his murder rampage. The Indian Posse had beaten "James" up and warned him to "stay solid" (underworld slang for someone who can be trusted not to talk to the police). On 11 January 2008, Wolfe was charged with two counts of first degree murder and three counts of attempted murder. Wolfe broke down in tears to his mother as he attempted to tell her the news. At 2:30 pm, the charges were read to him and he was taken to the RCMP's Reginia jail. Staff Sergeant Maureen Wilkie of the Royal Canadian Mounted Police had prepared a "sting" operation against Wolfe with a RCMP officer, Don Perron, to serve as Wolfe's cellmate with the cover story being he was an outlaw biker arrested for gun-running.

== Confessions ==
At 10:15 am on 12 January 2008, the fire alarm at the RCMP office was activated to provide an excuse to pull all the prisoners out of the station. Wolfe was placed in the same car as Granbois. Unaware that the car was bugged, Wolfe was recorded saying to Granbois: "Stick to the same story. We were just in town to pick up beer and then went back to the reserve. Just stick to your fucking story, that's all you're to do, man". From the car, Wolfe saw Perron arrive at the station in handcuffs while the constables pulled AK-47 assault rifles from the trunk of Perron's car. Wolfe was taken back in to the station to be interrogated by the Cree Mountie Sergeant Chuck LeRat. Shortly after the interrogation began, LeRat stated he had to take a phone call and left the room with his laptop on the desk. As LeRat watched from behind the mirror window, Wolfe got up to look at the laptop and clicked on a video of Granbois being interrogated, which surprised him.

LeRat then returned to the room and told Wolfe that the Crown had an overwhelming case against him. LeRat played the video of Granbois confessing. LeRat told Wolfe: "I guess you're thinking Gerrard ratted you out...It's what happens. When the ship starts sinking, people jump off. It's self preservation". LeRat used the Reid technique in an attempt to have Wolfe confess. When Wolfe commented that he was destined to die in prison, LeRat asked him "why?" and received the reply "because that's just the way it is, man". LeRat asked Wolfe when he started drinking and was told that he started drinking at about age 9 or 10. Wolfe stated that he dropped out of school in grade 6, but he was fully literate and "I just don't have the grades to pass". LeRat commented that he had only a grade 12 education, but he had "street sense". In an attempt to bond with Wolfe, LaRat told him that the people with university degrees looked down with utter contempt on everyone who lacked a university degree, but that: "Street sense is more valuable than any education... University can't teach you that". LeRat's attempt to appeal to Wolfe's resentment of the university-educated elitists who despised him as an uneducated person worked and Wolfe agreed "yeah, I can read people quick". As LeRat built on his rapport with Wolfe, he asked him if he was "impulsive" and committed acts without thinking though the consequences. LeRat asked him: "The only thing that's left is your intent. I don't pass judgement. If it was just a matter of you going there to settle a score and not take anyone's life, then clarify that for Chrissakes! I'm not here to put words in your mouth, but you're the only one who knows". Wolfe fell silent and refused to speak, though LeRat sensed that he wanted to say something. LeRat told him: "As your mum said, now you've got to start doing good. And you can do it. It's your decision". As Wolfe remained silent, LeRat told him "you've got a hard shell there, Danny, but there's a lot of good inside of you". LeRat later said of Wolfe: "He was bad, but he wasn't rotten to the core". However, Wolfe refused to confess and said it was 4:00 am, and that he was tired. LeRat showed him the photographs of "James", who had been beaten bloody by the Indian Posse and asked him if he was proud to have unleashed such violence on a 15-year-old boy. LeRat then reminded Wolfe that of the 12 founding members of the Indian Posse in 1988, only 3 were still alive in 2008 with the rest all murdered. LeRat told him: "You're not a stupid man. You're a very intelligent individual. As you said before, you may not have the education to show for it, but it's all there". LeRat then told Wolfe that his prized underworld reputation was no more and that. "Danny, maybe it's time to retire". All that Wolfe said in response was "it's true".

LeRat offered Wolfe a bowl of soup and Wolfe said of his youth: "I did all my schooling inside, trying to figure out who I was, where I came from". LeRat then changed his avenue of attack, and commented that as a First Nations person he preferred wild meat from the animals he hunted and trapped over meat from the grocery stores and restaurants. LeRat told Wolfe: "I still trap beaver and muskrats and I've done that since I was twelve years old". Wolfe told LeRat that he wished he had a childhood like his with a loving family who had brought him up in Cree traditions. LeRat told Wolfe that he was a fool to use a 15-year-old boy like "James" in the massacre and reminded him of the beating that "James" had suffered. Out of guilt, Wolfe got up of his chair and laid down on the floor. As LeRat continued to urge him to confess, Wolfe said "what am I gonna do?" Wolfe came close to confessing as he said: "But like you say, I'm done, man. It doesn't matter what I say or do now". Though Wolfe came close to confessing, he never did and the questioning ended at 8 am.

Upon being returned to his cell, Wolfe spoke with Perron whom he had seen earlier. As outlaw bikers are the elite in the Canadian underworld, Wolfe seemed anxious for Perron's approval. Wolfe told him when Perron asked about his tattoos: "It's my life. Used to do drive-bys in the 'Peg...shot people...I'm one of the founding members of the IP". Wolfe boasted to Perron that the Indian Posse had 3,000 members, making it easily the largest street gang in Canada. Wolfe said of his interrogation: "I ain't gonna come home, man. This is it". Wolfe stated he worked with the Rock Machine in the past, but he expressed considerable rage at outlaw bikers as he said: "We're a different kind of cultural community. I know all the bros involved in two-wheelers [motorcycles] and I keep trying to tell them, the two-wheelers, whether they're Big Red [the Hells Angels] or Bandidos or whatever. I told them, 'you learn, we're in Canada, man. This is fucking Indian country'. This is who we are. We'll always be here...And this is what I'm trying to get across. Anytime we go to them, they want to control. They want to take our shit, you know?" Wolfe complained that outlaw bikers wanted to exploit First Nations gangs like the Indian Posse, and he disliked bikers for that reason. Wolfe then changed topics and spoke of a dream he had where a wolf had growled at him. Wolfe took his dream as a warning from the mooshums (spirits) that he had to change his life now or die in the near future. He expressed regret that he ignored the warning from the mooshums as he had done a terrible thing. Wolfe expressed much fury at Granbois for turning Crown's evidence, and then told Perron: "I had a .22 [rifle] with a twenty-five shot [clip]...I got rid of it, but still they won't need it...They got this guy talking. That's it, man".

Wolfe told Perron that he was resigned to being convicted and spending the rest of his life in prison. Wolfe went on to say: "Keep me in remand, I'm gonna fucking terrorize the streets from inside too. I'll create monsters and send them out. That's what I'm gonna do. I created how many monsters already? Monsters! Send 'em out to kill people and come back with a life bit". Wolfe then went on to confess to the McKay murder and described how they had strangled McKay to death in 2006. Wolfe described LeRat as an effective interrogator who had nearly broken him into confessing. Wolfe then gave his account of his shooting spree as he stated he feared that the incident at the Trapper's Bar would damage his underworld reputation and that the only possible solution in his viewpoint was his murder rampage. After expressing the wish to kill Granbois again, Wolfe spoke about Cree ceremonies. Wolfe told Perron that he believed in ghosts and mooshums, saying: "It's wild, man. It's like a vision. You either have visions or the mooshum will work through the old guy and he'll get the answers...I haven't seen a mooshum. I only felt, like in my heart...I can tell when there's a ghost around or something". Wolfe stated he lied to the mooshums in his prayers who had taken their revenge on him by having him charged with first-degree murder. Wolfe then changed the subject back to his wish to kill Granbois again, saying: "We kill. We don't give a fuck, man." Wolfe continued his rant against Granbois and told Perron: "They [the police] had fucking nothing, man. No prints, no guns. Got rid of that. Nothing. No hair. No spit". With the confession that Perron had elicited and which was recorded, the Crown had a very strong case against Wolfe.

== Escape ==
Wolfe's lawyer, Estes Fonkalsrud, described Wolfe as a quiet and calm client who was resigned to his fate. Fonkalsrud stated the "sting" operation had doomed Wolfe and that without the confession, the Crown would have probably made a plea bargain where Wolfe would take a guilty plea to second degree murder in exchange for a lesser prison term. Wolfe was placed in the Regina Correctional Centre and shared his range with his younger half-brother Preston Buffalocalf and several members of the Native Syndicate Killers, a puppet gang of the Indian Posse.

Wolfe started planning his escape as soon as he arrived at the centre. The Regina Correctional Centre was an old jail built in 1915 and last modernized in 1960, and the crumbling jail, that the federal government had not bothered to maintain, provided several avenues of escape. There was a blind spot for the security cameras and Wolfe had been able to use his nail clipper as a crude screwdriver to remove the grille, which covered the heating radiator, in the blind spot. In May 2008, a contractor doing repairs to the jail neglected to lock the door to a maintenance tunnel, an oversight that Wolfe was quick to take advantage of. Joining Wolfe in the plot were several other prisoners from the Unit3A range. The prisoners used a shower rod to break the chain on a door that the tunnel led to, which in turn led to another door, but this one had a stronger and newer chain that the shower rod could not break. However, Wolfe took several tools from the tunnel left by the contractor and used them to start digging a hole though the crumbling wall behind the heating radiator. The principle problem for Wolfe was a metal sheet placed inside the wall, which he had to use a drill bit to punch a hole though, a progress that took several months. Wolfe attached a blade that had been smuggled in to a broom handle to speed up the progress of punching a hole. On 26 June 2008, a prison guard received an email saying that a popular rumour was that Wolfe would be breaking out of jail "like in the movies", which was passed on to a supervisor, who ignored it. On 3 July 2008, the Regina police warned the jail staff that Wolfe was planning to break out, which led to the jail being placed on lockdown for the rest of July and the first half of August. Wolfe worked out vigorously to prepare himself for the escape.

Wolfe broke out from the Regina Correctional Centre on 24 August 2008 and was arrested three weeks later in Winnipeg. At 8:30 pm on 24 August, Wolfe told Preston Buffalocalf that this was the night to break out. Using their tools, the Wolfe brothers smashed a hole though the wall of the jail later that night. Wolfe used a blanket to cover himself as he crawled under the barbed wire fence. Wolfe reached the top of the wall and jumped down 15 feet to the ground. Wolfe climbed over two more fences to reach freedom. Joined by his half-brother Preston and Cody Keenatch and Ken Iron, Wolfe walked across the fields to a railroad, which the group used to walk down to Regina. At 8:50 pm, the Regina police called the correctional centre to say that an informer had just told them that Wolfe had escaped. It was only at 10:08 pm that the jail confirmed that Wolfe had indeed escaped. The first of the group who escaped to be arrested was Ken Iron, who was apprehended at a hockey arena at 11:15 pm by a policeman who recognized him. Friesen noted that Wolfe had executed one of the "most spectacular prison breaks in Canadian history" as he escaped from a maximum security wing. However, Friesen noted there is a strong possibility that Wolfe's escape had been made possible by corruption as he made thousands of dollars selling drugs within the jail to the other inmates; several guards at the Regina Correctional Centre had been convicted of corruption for allowing the drugs in; and the jail staff seemed suspiciously indifferent to reports from the police that a break-out was being planned in the summer of 2008. At 3 am, Wolfe and his followers reached Regina, bloody from the cuts caused by the barbed wire. To provide themselves with a vehicle, the group stole a car they found parked on the street. The group drove out to the Okanese reserve to see Wolfe's cousin Tatiana Buffalocalf to pick up sleeping bags. Wolfe drove out to an area called the Big Bush, where he slept.

The RCMP was so embarrassed by Wolfe's escape that initially the public was not informed. Sergeant Brent Ross of the Mounties was assigned to recapture Wolfe. Over the protests of the Saskatchewan government, Ross had a press release informing the Canadian people that six prisoners, all charged with murder, had escaped from the Regina Correctional Centre. The manhunt for Danny Wolfe across the Prairies, who was described by the police as highly dangerous, attracted much media attention. The news of the escape caused panic on the Okanese reserve as it was feared that Wolfe would kill the people who had agreed to testify for the Crown against him. Wolfe had planned to live in the wild, hunting the local animals for food, but the lack of guns doomed his plans. Wolfe and his party were picked up from the Big Bush several days later by an Indian Posse member who drove them to Brandon. During his three weeks of freedom, Wolfe returned to Winnipeg, where he engaged in much womanizing and substance abuse. The escape made Wolfe into an instant folk hero who was celebrated throughout Canada as the man who defied the Crown by breaking out from jail. The leaders of the Indian Posse in Winnipeg were unhappy to see Wolfe return to that city as he usurped their authority and would have preferred that he had not escaped.

Wolfe stayed at the apartment of a friend, and raised $3,000 by robbing a bank. Later that night, Wolfe attended a party where he was celebrated as Canada's most wanted man and was surrounded by dozens of adoring young women. Preston Buffalocalf recalled of his time on the run: "The best part? The girls, man, the girls. There were lots, coming and going. They took advantage of us". Women were obsessed with Wolfe who was seen as an extremely sexy "bad boy", and women pursued him just as ardently as the police. To taunt the police, Wolfe posted on his Facebook account: "What's up? I'm out!". Ross complained about the glorification of Wolfe as a sex symbol as he stated that Wolfe was a vicious criminal with "no conscience". In order to collect a reward an anonymous caller gave his location away to the police. The first major tip occurred on 10 September 2008 when someone reported to the police the apartment where Preston was staying at. As the police entered the building, Preston called Danny to warn him. Danny removed the SIM card from his cellphone and smashed it to prevent the police from tracing his location. On 16 September 2008, Wolfe was followed by the police and arrested in the automobile of Daniella Bevacqua at the intersection of Flora and Salter Streets in Winnipeg. Wolfe was returned to the Regina Correctional Centre. In jail, Wolfe met his father for the first time since 1988. Richard Wolfe Senior had spent a day drinking hairspray and then had stabbed another homeless man to death with a screwdriver. He was convicted of manslaughter, which was his fifty-fifth conviction. In jail, Wolfe was unhappy with the way that the Indian Posse had been portrayed in 2004 film Stryker and contacted the media to tell as he saw it the true story of the Indian Posse.

== Trial ==
On 20 October 2009, Wolfe went on trial for murder and attempted murder in Regina. Fonkalsrud began the trial by saying he was withdrawing from the case as he could no longer work with his client. Justice Eugene Scheibel stated that Wolfe could not fire his lawyer 15 minutes before his trial started as it would impose a delay while Wolfe sought a new lawyer, and ordered Fonkalsrud to remain as Wolfe's lawyer. During the trial, Wolfe remained calm and cool in the courtroom, rarely showing emotions.

The first witness called by the Crown was Constable Jan Lussier who described the crime scene he found. A ballistics expert testified that the shell casings found at the crime scene matched the shell casings found at Buffalocalf's house. Christina Cook testified she saw Wolfe murder her husband who took a bullet to save her life when Wolfe aimed his rifle at her. Despite the fact that Wolfe had shot him 9 times and shot off one of his testicles, Pascal refused to testify for the Crown as he followed the underworld code to never incriminate another criminal. Granbois testified for the Crown that he was the getaway driver and saw Wolfe enter the house at 302 Pasqua Avenue with a .22 rifle. Perron appeared as the star witness to testify that Wolfe had made a jailhouse confession, which was supported by the audio tapes. Wolfe felt that Fonkalsrud was an incompetent lawyer and he lashed out at him, saying he would be better off defending himself. Against the advice of his lawyer, Wolfe took the stand and testified in his own defense. Wolfe was a poor witness who made a terrible impression on the jury by calling the murder allegations against him a "bunch of fucking bullshit lies" without providing any reason for that assertion.

On 28 October 2009, the final submissions were made. Fonkalsrud argued that Granbois had committed perjury in exchange for immunity and Perron had tricked Wolfe into making a false confession by posing as an outlaw biker as Wolfe tried too hard to impress him. The Crown Attorney, Alister Johnston, noted that Wolfe had confessed to Perron; that the shell casings found at Buffalocalf's house were fired from the same gun used to commit the murders; and that the video footage at the Trapper's Bar showed the dispute between Pascal and Wolfe. On 18 November 2009, Danny Wolfe was convicted of two counts of murder and three counts of attempted murder, being sentenced to life imprisonment with a chance to apply for parole after 25 years. Justice Scheibel stated that Wolfe had shown "a callous disregard for human life. There are no mitigating circumstances in this vicious, gang-related home invasion". The family members of the victims mocked Wolfe's self-proclaimed mission to be defending First Nations peoples as they noted all of the people that Wolfe shot on the night of 20 September 2007 were First Nations people. Joyce Poitras, the mother of Michael Itittakose, whom she referred by his Cree name Hoto Wakiya Hokshila, called her son a "good man" while calling Wolfe "a hardcore gang member with no compassion for life or the human race".

== Murder ==
Wolfe was sent to the "House of Misery" as he called the Saskatchewan Penitentiary to serve his life sentence. Wolfe was anxious to see his girlfriend Shenoa, as he found the prospect of life without sex to be profoundly depressing, which provided him with a motive for good behaviour, as conjugal visits are at the discretion of the prison officials who can grant or deny them as they wish. However, Wolfe wanted to remain within the Indian Posse and the Indian Posse faction at the Saskatchewan Penitentiary was ridden with intrigue and jealousy while a rift had occurred between the Indian Posse and the Native Syndicate Killers. In a New Year's call to his mother on 3 January 2010 Wolfe stated "everything is going crazy".

While serving his life sentence in the Saskatchewan Penitentiary, Danny Wolfe was murdered by another prisoner on 4 January 2010. At about noon on 4 January 2010, Wolfe was in the common area when several other Indian Posse prisoners were attacked by inmates from the Native Syndicate Killers gang. Wolfe was not the target and was only stabbed by Jacob Worm of the Native Syndicate Killers with his "shiv" (homemade knife) when he tried to come to the aid of the Indian Posse member Cheyenne Nelson whom Worm was stabbing. Worm stabbed Wolfe twice in the chest. The second stab had severed Wolfe's right coronary artery, causing massive internal bleeding that killed him within minutes of him being stabbed. The murder of Wolfe made the national news. Wolfe was buried at the Okanese Reserve. The Cree former Saskatoon policeman-turned-author Ernie Louttit criticised efforts to make a "folk hero out of Danny Wolfe", saying he and his brother grew up in "tragic" conditions, but that "it just seemed like they were bound and determined to live fast and die hard, which ultimately they did."

== Books ==
- Auger, Michel; Edwards, Peter (2012). The Encyclopedia of Canadian Organized Crime: From Captain Kidd to Mom Boucher. Toronto: McClelland & Stewart. ISBN 978-0771030499.
- Friesen, Joe (2016). The Ballad of Danny Wolfe Life of a Modern Outlaw. Toronto: McClelland & Stewart. ISBN 9780771030314.
