= White Boy Posse =

Canadian neo-Nazi criminal organization

- The group uses the Reichskriegsflagge of Nazi Germany, as shown in photos.
- Founded: 2003
- Founder: Sean "Fat Mike" Jackson
- Founding location: Edmonton, Alberta, Canada
- Territory: Western Canada
- Ethnicity: White Canadian
- Membership: unknown
- Activities: Drug trafficking, assault, and murder
- Allies: Hells Angels MC; Syndicate Motorcycle Club
- Rivals: Bandidos MC; Manitoba Warriors; Crazy Dragons Killers; Indian Posse; Redd Alert; Independent Soldiers
- Notable members: Joshua Petrin

White Boy Posse (WBP), sometimes spelled as the Whiteboy Posse, is a Canadian White supremacist neo-Nazi organized crime group founded in 2003 in Edmonton, Alberta, Canada, the organization is primarily active in Western Canada.

== Formation and history ==
The White Boy Posse was founded in the year 2003 by Sean "Fat Mike" Jackson, a close associate of the Hells Angels Motorcycle Club.

Members are known to come from impoverished backgrounds, experiencing violence and abuse on a regular basis. Racist attitudes tend to initially be learned at home and later manipulated by gang leaders.

The gang first received media attention in Edmonton in 2004 after five White Boy Posse members were kidnapped and assaulted by rival gang the Crazy Dragon Killers.

Since its initial formation, the gang has since spread and currently operating in Alberta, Saskatchewan and the Northwest Territories.

== Structure and organization ==
The White Boy Posse is a criminal enterprise that conducts cross-border business with a broad spectrum of other gangs and organized crime groups. The group is primarily active in Northern Alberta, but had reach as far as Yellowknife. Groups like the White Boy Posse are employed by larger criminal organizations to carry out crimes that would risk drawing police attention.

Fully initiated members, referred to as "fully-patched", sport tattoos of the gang. WBP members also tend to exhibit tattoos of typical Nazi symbolism clichés including the Hakenkreuz, the reichsadler, and other related national socialist motifs reminiscent of the Third Reich. However, they appear to have no links to any of the country's white power skinhead gangs, despite their neo-Nazi ideological stance. Nevertheless, the WBP is widely considered by Canadian law enforcement to be bent on racial supremacism.

== Notable crimes ==
=== Death of Martin William Kent ===
In 2007, Martin William Kent, who belonged to the White Boy Posse, was run over and killed while trying to prevent fellow WBP member William Roy King from stealing his car. King later pleaded guilty to criminal negligence causing death and was sentenced to 3.5 years in prison.

=== Killing of Mitchell Chambers ===
In December 2008, 23-year-old Mitchell Chambers was shot and killed in his pickup truck while waiting to take a woman to a movie. The shooter was later identified as Joshua Petrin, a high-ranking member of the White Boy Posse. Investigators allege that Chambers had been shot over the romantic relationship he had with the woman, a former girlfriend of Petrin's. In 2017, Petrin pleaded guilty to manslaughter and was sentenced to 10 years in prison.

=== Lorry Santos homicide ===
In September 2012, Lorry Ann Santos, a 34-year-old mother of four, was fatally gunned down after answering a knock on the door to her home. Her killing had apparently been intended for T.J. Cromartie, a former White Boy Posse member who left the gang in 2012. Cromartie served as a trusted lieutenant and cocaine-trafficking associate of Joshua Petrin, operating in Edmonton and Lloydminster, Alberta. In the summer of 2012, Cromartie fled the gang, taking cash and a firearm, which prompted Petrin to place a bounty or reward on his life. Instead, an error had led the gunman, later identified as Randy O'Hagan, to the wrong address, where Santos resided instead of T.J. Cromartie.

Lorry Santos' killer was identified as Randy O'Hagan. Also charged with murder were Joshua Petrin and Kyle Halbauer. Halbauer pleaded guilty to first degree murder, while O'Hagan and Petrin were convicted at trial. All three men were sentenced to life in prison without the possibility of parole for 25 years.

=== Bob Roth decapitation ===
In October 2012, the headless corpse of Robert John "Bob" Roth Sr. was discovered by Edmonton police located inside a garbage bag in a back alley near 132nd Avenue and 72nd Street in the Balwin neighbourhood.

Roth was murdered by Randy O'Hagan and Nikolas Jon Nowytzkyj, two White Boy Posse members. In 2015, O'Hagan pleaded guilty to second degree murder and was sentenced to life in prison without the possibility of parole for 11 years. Nowytzkyj pleaded guilty to manslaughter and was sentenced to 20 years in prison.

=== Shooting of Bryan Gower ===
Sometime prior to or during 2012, alleged drug dealer Bryan Gower had apparently been stealing drugs and money from other associates of the White Boy Posse. In response, high-ranking WBP member Joshua Petrin ordered him killed. Two White Boy Posse hitmen, Kyle Halbauer and Randy O'Hagan, were then sent to meet with Gower where he would be lured to his death. Once Gower had shown up to what was supposed to be a drug exchange at a rural intersection north of Lloydminster, he was immediately gunned down.

The shooter, Kyle Darren Halbauer, was arrested in December of the same year. Halbauer pleaded guilty to second degree murder and was sentenced to life in prison without the possibility of parole for 13 years. In 2016, Petrin was found guilty of manslaughter for ordering Gower's death and sentenced to 10 years in prison.

== Law enforcement action ==
=== Operation Goliath ===
Starting in late 2006, members of the Edmonton Police Service and the Organized Crime Unit of the Royal Canadian Mounted Police conducted an undercover 15-month operation that targeted the White Boy Posse.

Dubbed Project Goliath, this law enforcement sting resulted in the arrest of 14 members of the White Boy Posse. 28 firearms, $500,000 in cocaine, over $300,000 in cash, 3,000 ecstasy pills, and several stolen items were also seized by the RCMP.

Project Goliath consisted of RCMP officers from Leduc, Lloydminster, Fort McMurray, Yellowknife and Whitecourt in the investigation, implying that the White Boy Posse had been active in said areas.

=== ALERT ===
Following the three killings that occurred in 2012, an 8-week investigation by Alberta Law Enforcement Response Teams (ALERT) was initiated. It led to the arrest of three White Boy Posse Members, one of which was Joshua Petrin.

== See also ==
Other Canadian neo-Nazi organizations:

- Aryan Guard
- Heritage Front (defunct)
- Nationalist Party of Canada
- Tri-City Skins (defunct)
- Canadian Nazi Party (defunct)

Other organized crime groups in Canada:

- Manitoba Warriors
- Dixon Bloods
- Indian Posse
