= Redd Alert =

Indigenous Canadian organized crime group

- Founded: 1999
- Founding location: Edmonton Institution
- Years active: 1999-present
- Territory: Western Canada
- Ethnicity: Indigenous Canadians
- Activities: Drug trafficking, assault, home invasion, murder, contract killing, robbery and prostitution
- Allies: Native Syndicate; Brothers Keepers; Hells Angels; Independent Soldiers
- Rivals: ASAP; Red Scorpions; United Nations (gang); Kang crime family (BIBO gang); White Boy Posse

Redd Alert (RA) are an indigenous Canadian criminal gang which operates as both a prison gang and a street gang.

== History ==
Redd Alert was established in 1999 by Robert Lee Wagner along with other First Nations inmates of Cree, Anishinaabe, and Métis origin as an alternative to joining two of the other Aboriginal gangs within the Alberta prison system: the Indian Posse and the Manitoba Warriors. Details on their origin are unclear but some reports say they originated as an offshoot of the Edmonton Northside Boys.

== Structure ==
Redd Alert is composed mainly of Indigenous youth, many of whom come from rough, displaced backgrounds such as dysfunctional households and juvenile detention. Redd Alert maintain an alliance with the Hells Angels Motorcycle Club, for whom they reportedly sell drugs. Redd Alert are also affiliated with the Independent Soldiers and Brothers Keepers (gang), two organized crime gangs active across Canada's Western provinces and internationally.
