= Indian Posse =

Aboriginal Canadian gang

- Founded: 1988; 38 years ago
- Founding location: Winnipeg, Manitoba, Canada
- Years active: 1988–present
- Territory: Canada, United States
- Ethnicity: Aboriginal Canadian
- Activities: Drug trafficking, auto theft, witness intimidation, assault, cigarette smuggling, witness tampering, gambling, weapons trafficking, prostitution, extortion, armed robbery, contract killing, blackmailing, kidnapping, human trafficking, money laundering, arson and murder
- Allies: West End Gang Some factions of Redd Alert in British Columbia and Northern Territories
- Rivals: Hells Angels MC; Manitoba Warriors; Redd Alert; White Boy Posse

The Indian Posse (IP) is an Aboriginal street gang active in Western Canada based in Winnipeg, Manitoba. It is one of the largest street gangs in Canada.

Criminal Intelligence Service Canada (CISC) has designated the IP as being a member of indigenous-based organized crime (IBOC). CISC asserts that the Indian Posse, in addition to engaging in marijuana cultivation, auto theft, illegal firearms activities, gambling, and drug trafficking, also supports and facilitates criminal activities for the Hells Angels motorcycle gang and Asian-based networks.

== The Wolfe brothers ==
The gang was founded in the summer of 1988 in Winnipeg as a street gang by the Wolfe brothers, Danny and Richard. Richard Daniel Wolfe was born in 1975 and Daniel Richard Wolfe was born in 1976. The Wolfe brothers were Cree, but spoke English as their first language though Danny Wolfe as an adult expressed the wish to learn the Cree language. Danny Wolfe was born premature and suffered from fetal alcohol syndrome as his mother drank during her pregnancy. Throughout his life, Danny Wolfe displayed poor self-control, anger issues and a tendency towards aggression, which are typical of those born with fetal alcohol syndrome. The father of the Wolfe brothers, Richard Wolfe Sr, was an alcoholic while their mother, Susan Creeley, was a drug addict and an alcoholic who by her own admission failed dismally at being a mother. As a father, Richard Wolfe Sr, was only irregularly involved in raising his sons, and was last seen by them in 1988. Richard Wolfe Sr. ended up living on the streets. Creeley's father was the chief of the Okanese First Nation reservation in Saskatchewan and he was a highly respected World War II veteran. But his life fell apart due to his alcoholism, and he regularly beat his wife and children. Creeley attended a residential school from the age of 6 onward and was raped by her teacher, causing her to engage in heavy drinking from the age of 12 onward. In an interview, Creeley defined her mothering as: "I just went to the party and got drunk. I didn't give a shit. I did that because I didn't have any love in my heart and I didn't have parenting skills. I lost that in the residential schools". In sentencing Richard Wolfe Jr. in 2010 following his convictions for rape and assault, the judge stated: "He was raised in an environment where substance abuse and domestic violence was prevalent. Richard was repeatedly exposed to violence which occurred during his parents' house parties. He was sexually abused at the age of seven, once by a stranger and twice by a neighbour. The episodes of sexual abuse left Richard confused, ashamed and full of hate".

Creeley lived on welfare, but spent so much money on alcohol and drugs that her sons were usually hungry. To feed themselves, the Wolfe brothers started stealing, smashing the windows of cars to steal whatever money happened to be in the car in order to buy food, leading to frequent arrests. By the age of 10, Danny Wolfe was already an accomplished shop-lifter and stole his first automobile. The Wolfe brothers grew up in the "howling chaos of the North End" of Winnipeg where the people live in a Third World level of poverty and where arson, shootings, heavy drinking on the streets, prostitution and drug abuse were daily occurrences. The journalist Jon Friesen wrote about the Wolfe brothers: "By the time they were about ten or eleven years old, Danny and Richard were quite accustomed to raising themselves. They had no regard for conventional rules or morality. They saw themselves as survivors and were prepared to do whatever it took to make it". Creeley, who stopped her substance abuse and drinking in 2001, believes that if she had been a better mother, her sons might have chosen a different path, and now works as a youth counselor, trying to save troubled First Nations young people from the fate of her sons.

The Wolfe brothers were greatly influenced by American gangsta rap, which was their favorite genre of music, and much of the style of the gang owned considerably more to Afro-American gangsta rappers than to First Nations culture. The word Indian was often used in a pejorative sense in Manitoba, and the Wolfe brothers picked the name Indian Posse as an attempt to cancel out the negative sense of the word Indian, just in the same way that some Afro-Americans call themselves "niggas" in an attempt to turn a derogatory word into an affirmative one. The symbol of the gang was and still is a red bandanna. The red bandanna is a symbol of the group's Red Power politics, symbolizes blood and passion, and because the gang believes that red is the color of power. The group was only open to indigenous people and was led by a "circle" (council) of ten. The Indian Posse does not and never did have a single traditional crime boss. Officially, all decisions had to reached unanimously by the circle in a nod to the traditional collective leadership of the Cree whose ruling "circles" required unanimity, but in reality the Wolfe brothers dominated the circle. A sense of First Nations identity outweighed any of the traditional divisions and Cree, Ojibwa and Métis were all well represented in the Indian Posse. Within a year of its founding, the gang had hundreds of members and primarily engaged in theft. Initially the gang had both male and female members, but in 1990 the rules were changed to make the gang into an all-male group, ostensibly to protect the female members from violence . The cardinal rules of the Indian Posses are that its members were forbidden to take "hard drugs" such as cocaine and heroin; are never to speak to outsiders about the gang's activities: and that new members had to endure "minutes of pain" where they be beaten by other members for at least five minutes to test their toughness while those wishing to leave had also endure the "minutes of pain", but only for much longer. All members of the Indian Posse were required to serve a prison term, which created the perverse initiative for the Indian Posse members to commit crimes with the idea of being arrested and convicted. The requirement to serve a prison sentence was imposed partly as a test to weed out those who might be inclined to turn Crown's evidence and partly as a means for indoctrination as the Indian Posse has a strong presence in prisons in western Canada.

The Indian Posse was divided into levels modelled after those of the outlaw biker gangs. An Indian Posse applicant would be asked to commit a crime, usually a robbery or moving drugs, and provided the mission was accomplished successfully would be allowed to wear the "G-money" tattoo, which consisted of a G intersected with a dollar sign, which gave them the status of a "prospect". Provided that a member continued to complete missions successfully, they would be promoted up to the rank of "striker", the second level in the Indian Posse. The highest level was that of a "full patch" member who would be allowed to wear a tattoo of a shied on the neck, a tattoo of arms bars on the forearms, and by a tattoo reading Indian Posse on the back. The "full patch" back tattoo was only allowed for those members who served time in a federal prison. Membership of the Indian Posse was to be for life, and the penalty for leaving the gang was death. The gang grew rapidly. One early member recalled that in 1988-1989: "Within a year the numbers climbed into the hundreds. I have no idea why that happened. I thought we were just a bunch o kinds hanging out together. But all of a sudden there were members everywhere". One female founding member, known as "Lynn" stated: "Once in a while we would have the silver spoon kids come and hang with us, but they wouldn't last. They had everything: meals, parents who cared they went to school, clothes, chores. I never had that. Danny never had that. We were just running all the time at all hours". For most members of the Indian Posse, the gang provided a surrogate family in place of their own dysfunctional families.

Richard Wolfe started carrying a handgun to school at the age of 13, and after his gun was discovered by a teacher, resulted in his first criminal conviction on 2 February 1989. By 1990, the Indian Posse moved into automobile theft and armed robbery. By 1991, the teenage Wolfe brothers had moved into drug dealing and prostitution and by 1992 had rented a house for $866 rent per month. In 1991, the Indian Posse had established an open air drug market outside of the Merchant's Hotel, known locally as "the Merch", on Selkirk Avenue in the North End of Winnipeg. The drug market outside of "the Merch" became one of the largest emporiums for buying drugs in Winnipeg. The Lord Selkirk Park Housing Development, whose inhabitants were almost entirely First Nations or Métis people, had become the stronghold of the Indian Posse, whose members sold cocaine, LSD, heroin, and marijuana. The Third World poverty of the North End of Winnipeg made joining the gang attractive to many young people. Richard Wolfe was considered to be the "diplomat" who was calm and able to think in the long term while Danny Wolfe was the "warrior" who was a hot-head who thought only in the short term. On 1 June 1993, the Indian Posse was mentioned for the first time by the Winnipeg Free Press, who described the Indian Posse as the gang that caused much crime in the North End.

== Expansion ==
On the night of 9 February 1994, a rival gang called the Overlords fired a shotgun at an Indian Posse house, leading to a drive-by shooting in retaliation a few hours later that left a woman wounded. As the first drive-by shooting in Winnipeg the incident attracted much media attention. Drive-by shootings are the favorite means of the Indian Posse to eliminate rivals, which in turn reflects the influence of black street gangs in Los Angeles, whom the Indian Posse model themselves after. The clothing style of the Indian Posse was a carbon-copy of Afro-American street gangs as the Indian Posse's preferred dress were and are baggy jeans, baseball hats, and track suits. The hand gestures which carry symbolic meanings used by the Indian Posse are copies of those used by black street gangs in Los Angeles. Danny Wolfe's favorite rapper was Tupac Shakur and the CDs of his music were one of his treasured possessions. Monster: The Autobiography of an L.A. Gang Member, the 1993 autobiography of Sanyika Shakur, a member of the Los Angeles gang, the Crips, has been described by the police as the "bible" of the Indian Posse, being virtually the only book that Indian Posse members all read, and which is constantly found whenever they raid the homes of Indian Posse members.

In September 1994, the Winnipeg police announced that they were targeting the Indian Posse, whom they blamed for much of the crime in the North End. In response, Richard Wolfe gave an interview with the journalist Paul Wiecek of the Winnipeg Free Press which gave the gang a high profile in Winnipeg and beyond. Richard Wolfe claimed the Indian Posse was a Red Power group committed to defending First Nations people from a racist society. The Indian Posse uses slogans such as "Red Till Dead" and "Fuck Canada, this land is our people". In 1994, the Indian Posse had made contracts with criminal elements in reservations in North Dakota and South Dakota in an attempt to set up a cross-border smuggling network. The Wolfe brothers also frequently visited British Columbia to set up a drug-smuggling network with the Vancouver underworld. Despite their claim to be protecting First Nations people, the IP engaged in sexual slavery, forcing girls as young as 10 to work as prostitutes.

By 1994, at the age of 19, Richard Wolfe was making between $15,000 to $30,000 a week, giving him an annual income of about $1 million Canadian dollars. However, the Wolfe brothers, like other Indian Posse members, were better at spending money than earning it. Sergeant Mike MacKinnon of Winnipeg police department stated: "There's no discipline to save cash and accrue assets. No education to rely on for cash management. You might pull them over and they'll have $10,000 or $15,000 on them, but at the end of the day that's money already spent... We haven't seen anyone moving up into buying large condos or anything like that. They still live in the neighborhoods they always lived in". MacKinnon dismissed the claim that the Indian Posse is defending and protecting First Nations people, saying: "If you look at the victims of their homicides, the girls they force into prostitution and the people they sell drugs to, they're victimizing their own people. There is nothing cultural about the Indian Posse. The only cultural thing is a gang subculture." Most of the Indian Posse members come from broken homes, which was a disadvantage as Richard Wolfe conceded in a 2011 interview: "The smart guy can be a tough guy when the time comes, but not vice versa. The smart guys usually stay out of gangs, though." In a letter to his brother in 2000, Danny Wolfe put it more earthly that the Indian Posse's principal problem was "too many fucked-up people recruiting fucked-up people."

On 14 May 1995, Richard Wolfe shot a pizza delivery man, Maciej Slawik, and was convicted of attempted murder on 31 May 1996. The owner of the pizzeria Jumbo Pizza owed the Wolfe brothers $60,000 in a drug debt and Richard Wolfe expected the money in cash in the pizza box when he ordered a pizza. To send a message to the pizzeria's owner, he impulsively decided to kill the pizza delivery man, saying in 2011: "I lost my cool. There were lots of people mad at me for that". The fact that Slawik was a Polish immigrant who had nothing to do with crime was not relevant to Wolfe who blasted him with a shotgun. The journalist Jon Friensen used the Slawik shooting incident as typical of the Indian Posse's reckless style as he noted that most gang bosses assign such work to their subordinates, instead of attempting to kill people themselves in public. After Richard Wolfe was charged with attempted murder, Danny Wolfe threatened to kill two witnesses if they testified against his brother, leading for him to be convicted of obstructing justice and uttering death threats in September 1995.

== Alpha gang ==
The Indian Posse's first chapter in Saskatchewan was mentioned in the press in March 1996. The gang made a major push into Saskatchewan, a province that is 10% First Nations whose First Nations population tended to be young and poor. The Indian Posse was especially in reserves in Saskatchewan and Manitoba where only 50% of the people living on the reserves have graduated from high school and where the unemployment rate is 80%. Richard Wolfe described the Indian Posse as enforcing a rule that required its leaders to turn over 30% of their profits to the ruling "circle" in the early 1990s, but another Indian Posse member known only as "Angus" due to a court order stated in the late 1990s he had to turn only 10% of his profits to the ruling "circle". "Angus" was a "full patch" member who ran his drug network into the reserves in northern Manitoba, most of which were so remote as to reached only by air plane as there are no roads linking them to the rest of Manitoba. "Angus" purchased cheap stereo systems from China to smuggle drugs via air planes to the northern reserves. "Angus" stated that a gram of cocaine that would sell for $100 in Winnipeg would sell for a $1, 000 on the northern reserves while a gram of marijuana that would sell for $10 in Winnipeg would sell for $70 on a northern reserve. "Angus" stated that he made $10, 000 per week in drug sales and his biggest cost was in bribing the band police forces.

On 25 April 1996, a riot broke out at Headingley Correctional Institution between the imprisoned Indian Posse members versus the imprisoned members of the rival Manitoba Warriors, which brought the gang national attention for the first time. Headingley was dominated by the imprisoned members of the Indian Posse who were allowed by the guards to beat prisoners; gather in the basement; and have sex with each other and the other inmates in the prison yard. In the prison chapel, the Indian Posse members would gather to smoke marijuana, which they called "the burning of the sweet grass". As a way of dominating the prison, new prisoners were branded with the initials IP with unsterilized heated paper clips by the Indian Posse members, regardless if they wanted the initials or not. One prisoner told a news crew after the riot: "If you are not a Posse member when you go into Headingley, you soon will be". The imprisoned members of the Manitoba Warriors decided to fight back and on the morning of 25 April 1996 gathered together, armed themselves with makeshift weapons from the prison kitchen and workshop, and went on a rampage, attacking the Indian Posse members. The guards lost control of the prison as the rival members of the Indian Posse and Manitoba Warriors fought each other with whatever makeshift weapons they could get their hands on. During the riot, sex offenders and informers were targeted for brutal beatings and castrations. One guard, Earl Deobald, was found with "his scalp hanging off" after his head was smashed in with a fire extinguisher. The riot, which put Headingley into a 18-hour lockdown, caused $8 million in damage while leaving eight guards seriously injured, four of whom had their fingers chopped off after taken prisoner.

Much of the rivalry between the Indian Posse and the Manitoba Warriors concerns their attitude towards the Hells Angels. The Warriors have long purchased their drugs from the Hells Angels while the Indian Posse takes a more anti-Angel position. The journalist Jerry Langton noted that as the Manitoba Warriors lacked "a cohesive conduit to large quantities of high-profit drugs like cocaine and meth, the Warriors remained small-time-out of prison, at least". Richard Wolfe stated about his brother's attitude towards outlaw bikers: "Danny always hated bikers". By 1996, the Indian Posse had expanded into Saskatchewan, mostly because of the practice of the federal government of sending convicted Indian Posse members to prisons in Saskatchewan. In contrast to the Indian Posse, which began as a street gang, through it has been active in prisons since the 1990s, the Manitoba Warriors were founded as a prison gang in 1993, and which has since become active on the streets. The Manitoba Warriors and the spin-off group, the Alberta Warriors, reflecting their origins in the prisons tended to be more organized than the Indian Posse and to have stronger ties to other organized crime groups such as the Hell Angels. The rival Redd Alert gang were founded in Alberta's prisons by First Nations prisoners who did not want to be forced to join either the Indian Posse or the Warriors.

As the feud between the Warriors and the Posse caused a spiraling murder rate among First Nations young men in western Canada, Ovide Mercredi, the National Chief of the Assembly of First Nations, in October 1996 attempted to arrange a ceasefire, meeting imprisoned leaders of both gangs at the Headingley prison. In a press statement, Mercredit stated he "was convinced the young aboriginal men representing these gangs were true leaders in their community". Mercredi stated he found members of both gangs to be "unexpectedly spiritual and fully fluent in aboriginal culture". Phil Fontaine, the Grand Chief of the Assembly of Manitoba Chiefs, likewise attempted to mediate a truce in January 1997 between the two gangs. David Cassel, the police chief of Winnipeg from 1996 to 1999, stated he was under intense pressure from the city council to crush the Indian Posse once and for all, but that this task was impossible as the Indian Posse was the product of decades of poverty, racism, sexual abuse, and dysfunctional families that could not be mended swiftly in the way that the city council believed that it could be. Cassels stated: "The police are left with the destruction and asked to clean up the pieces". Cassels noted that within the First Nations community of Winnipeg: "The police as an institution were not highly regarded". Cassels sought to build a relationships with the First Nations community as he argued that the current policy of simply arresting Indian Posse members was not working, much to the discomfort of much of the Winnipeg police. Cassels, who had previously served as the police chief of Edmonton, described the gang violence in Winnipeg as "horrific" as he noted that the primary weapons in the gang struggles were knives and fists, making for especially bloody killings. Cassel gave the example of an young whose head was stomped into a bloody mess after he was seen walking the house of a rival gang at 4 am. Cassels sought to reassure the public as he noted almost all of the murders in Winnipeg happened in the Indian Posse's stronghold in the North End that was bordered by the Young, Furby, Langside and Spence streets. Cassels described Winnipeg as being in a crisis as the number of gang members surged from 1, 000 to 1, 500, giving Winnipeg the dubious distinction of the Canadian city with the most gang member per capital. Cassels sought to combat the gang problem by pressuring the businesses to hire young First Nations people as he stated the abnormally high unemployment rate in the First Nations community was causing the growth of the gangs.

In late 1996 in an attempt to the Indian Posse influence in and around the Lord Selkirk Park Housing Development-known locally as "little Chicago"-Cassels appointed Constable Daniel Atwell to live in and patrol the area in an attempt to build trust. Atwell described his assignment of essentially operating a one-man police station in "little Chicago" as "scary as hell". Atwell closed down a number of Indian Posse "crack houses", but the gang was as adept at opening new ones as he soon he closed one down. Atwell devised a number of other strategies such as sending in the health inspector or the building inspector to shut down "crack houses" or sitting in a lawn chair in front of a "crack house" all day long to drive away customers. More successful was Atwell's efforts at building trust in a community that had long felt ignored by the police as he soon discovered that many people disliked the Indian Posse as violent bullies. In one especially tense confrontation, Atwell ordered three Indian Posse members out of a restaurant whose owner they were attempting to extort money from, leading to Atwell to draw his gun and force into the mouth of their leader, who finally backed down and left in disgrace. Atwell described the Indian Posse as a poorly organized gang made of a number of cells whose relationships with each other were often antagonistic. Atwell stated the Indian Posse was more of a brand than a gang. Atwell described the Indian Posse as the antithesis of tightly organized and disciplined biker gangs such as the Hells Angels. Atwell stated: "There were so many factions of the Indian Posse. There might have been 500 members, but in 250 groups. I'm exaggerating, but it was something like that....Because they carried the Indian Posse name, they caused fear".

Atwell stated the most disgusting aspect of the Indian Posse was the reliance upon child prostitution as he stated that a typical Indian Posse cell would have between 30 and 50 girls working as prostitutes with the majority being between the ages of 9–16. Atwell stated the Indian Posse child prostitutes were drug addicts who charged the lowest rate for sex in all of Winnipeg, but the younger the girl, the higher the rate, hence the use of very young girls for sex work. Atwell described one Indian Posse pimp who typically would enter the house of a pubescent girl living with her grandmother, thrown a bag of condoms and then announce to "get their asses out on the street" as Atwell phased it, meaning they were now working for him. Atwell stated that he asked to leave the Lord Selkirk district after discovering a six-year-old girl had been forced into prostitution as he stated the level of depravity he had witnessed had become too much for his soul to bear. Atwell stated that the usual excuses put forward for the Indian Posse such as drug addiction, dysfunctional families, and poverty were not true as he maintained that the Indian Posse members were just amoral, evil people. Atwell stated: "The Roberts of the world, these are mean, mean people. That doesn't reform, in my view. The adults had already made their beds. I knew there was no fixing them. I think the place to break the cycle was with the children. Give them goals, give them dreams, let them see that their potential was. There potential was not their uncle. It was to be Wayne Gretzky, to be a leader in their community. That's what I wanted to happen". Cassels was forced to resign as police chief in 1999 following an illegal strike by the police union, and his resignation, the community project he championed came to an end.

While serving a prison sentence in 2003 and 2004, Danny Wolfe befriended Gerry Matticks, the imprisoned boss of the Irish-Canadian West End Gang of Montreal. As Matticks is illiterate, Wolfe read and wrote letters for him. As the West End Gang control the port of Montreal, where most of the illegal drugs in Canada are imported, the alliance with the West End Gang became a profitable one for the Indian Posse. The Hells Angels approached Wolfe with an offer while he was in prison to become the exclusive wholesalers to the IP, selling them drugs while the IP would continue to serve as street dealers. Wolfe rejected the offer, saying the Indian Posse should be treated as equal to the Angels, not subordinates. In a phone call that was recorded by prison officials, Wolfe was heard to say: "We just told them [the Hells Angels], 'Hey man, we won't fucking stand in front, we won't stand behind you'. We're going to stand side by side if we do this... They wanted control. We just said 'No'. And ever since then, we had to back them off". The Indian Posse has since emerged as one of the Hells Angels' major rivals in western Canada.

In the summer of 2002, there had been a number of violent incidents at Stoney Mountain Penitentiary between the imprisoned members of the Hells Angels' puppet gang, the Zig Zag Crew, and the Indian Posse. A Zig Zag Crew member threw an Indian Posse member down a flight of stairs, leading to an Indian Posse member to stab and seriously wound a Zig Zag Crew member. In September 2002, the Indian Posse tried to assassinate Maurice Boucher of the Hells Angels by firing a bazooka at his prison cell. The journalists William Marsden and Julian Sher wrote that the Indian Posse had the "prison network and the bravado" to try to assassinate Boucher. The Indian Posse has a violent rivalry with the white supremacist gang, the White Boy Posse, which serves as a puppet gang for the Hells Angels in Alberta. In 2004, the Indian Posse were brought to further national attention by the documentary Stryker which chronicled a 13-year First Nations boy in Winnipeg working as an arsonist for the Indian Posse.

The Indian Posse has created a female auxiliary, the Indian Posse Girls, which has taken control of the prostitution rackets in Edmonton and Hobbema. The Indian Posse Girls, which dominate the prostitution rackets in Edmonton have been described as Canada's "first all-female gang". The Canadian criminologist Mark Totten wrote that many of the teenagers who work for the Indian Posse are sometimes pressured into joining, giving the case of a 12-year girl named Susan whose father was Cree while her mother was white. The exterior of the house where Susan lived in was spry-painted in red paint with insulting statements such as "Skank lives here" and "Susan is a slut!". Totten interviewed her, and Susan stated in her interview that she started selling drugs for the Indian Posse following the spray-painting of her mother's house, saying she had been given an ultimatum to either start selling drugs or be gang-raped. Totten interviewed another former Indian Posse member, a 24-year-old man named Charlie who at the time of the interview was homeless and dying of AIDS, which he contracted via the shared use of needles to inject drugs while he was in prison. In his interview, Charlie stated that he was placed "in care" while he was 10, which caused him to try to escape numerous times. When he was 11 years old, he finally escaped and ended up living homeless in Winnipeg. To support himself, Charlie started to steal and after his release from one of his prison terms, he joined the Indian Posse when he met several gang members whom he had known while he was in prison. Charlie stated that he wanted to sell cocaine and methamphetamine for the Indian Posse because it would allow him to make enough income to afford an apartment. Charlie endured the "minutes of pain", which allowed him to enter the gang; when he asked about going to hospital given his injuries caused by the beating, he was told to snort cocaine instead to deal with the pain. Totten wrote that "lost" young men such as Charlie were very typical of the Indian Posse members.

The fissiparous structure of the Indian Posse with the gang being in more ways more of a brand that united otherwise disparate cells made the Indian Posse especially prone to factionalism and in-fighting. One Indian Posse member stated: "It's not an organized crew at all". On 26 September 2003, an Indian Posse gang member, Gene Malcom, was shot in the back by a fellow Indian Posse member in a dispute over the profits from drug sales. Malcom's shooting, which had been ordered by Danny Wolfe, led to a faction of the Indian Posse, Clarence "Shrimpy" Williams to leave the gang to found a new gang called the Cash Money Brothers. Williams was the most successful Indian Posse drug dealer and his unwillingness to share the profits led to him and his followers leaving. One Indian Posse member stated: "It was all about money. Shrimpy was the making the most money and whoever was making the most money at that time had to give their 10 percent, give back to the kitty, back to the bank". The leader of the anti-Williams faction, Brad Maytwayashing, was jealous that Williams made $50, 000 per week in drug sales and demanded a larger cut of the profits than what Williams was prepared to give. On 4 October 2003, a group of Indian Posse members from Edmonton arrived in Winnipeg with the intention of killing Williams. The Winnipeg police arrested them on their way to kill Williams with two sawed-off shotguns in their possession. Maytwayashing in turn became unpopular within the Indian Posse and on 13 April 2004 was badly beaten at the Remand Centre in Winnipeg in an assault led by another Indian Posse member Raymond Armstrong. Armstrong reached out to shake Maywayashing's hand and then punched him in the face, joined by several other Indian Posse members who beat him with broom handles fashioned into sticks.

In 2005, the Criminal Intelligence Service Canada reported that the Indian Posse had moved into Edmonton and Fort McMurray, where it was active selling drugs. The same report stated the Indian Posse was also active in the Grande Prairie and Peace River Country regions of Alberta. The Indian Posse is very active in Yellowknife. In May 2006, an Indian Posse leader, Sheldon McKay, was strangled to death in his prison cell at the Stony Mountain prison by four other members led by Danny Wolfe. Residents of the Samson Cree Nation reservation in Alberta blamed the Indian Posse for a drive-by shooting in April 2008 that left an innocent by-stander, the toddler Asia Saddleback, wounded when she was hit by a stray bullet. A gang member, Christopher Crane, shot up the Saddleback house because he believed it was the home of a rival gang member. In 2008, Sidney Letandre, one of the Indian Posse's leaders attempted to leave the gang as he was a father and did not want to go to prison again. An Indian Posse member, Justin Meeches, knocked on Letandre's door and as he went to answer the door, Meeches opened fire with a rifle. Letandre was left a paraplegic as a result of his spinal injuries. Letandre said of the attack: "I’d seen quite a few people walk away and nobody cared because they didn’t mean anything. But they didn’t want me to leave and wanted to make an example out of me. I told them I had spent half my life with them, now I wanted to spend the next half of my life with my family". Leandrew who turned Crown's evidence after the attack said of his time in the Indian Posse: "“I was always drunk, always high. That’s the only way I could function with these guys".

In 2010, the Royal Canadian Mounted Police (RCMP) reported that the Indian Posse had moved into northern Ontario, the rural areas in the interior of British Columbia and the Far North of Canada. In May 2014, two Indian Posse members, Warner Flett and Michael Guimond, were convicted of manslaughter for beating to death Paris Bruce, a member of the rival MOB Squad on 4 September 2012. Bruce had attempting to persuade drug dealers working for the Indian Posse to instead starting working for the MOB Squad, which led to him being beaten to death. In 2017, an IP member in Saskatoon, Kyle Landon Neapetung, was convicted of torturing with a blowtorch another man, Brenden Peters, for five days in March 2016. In 2018, an IP member, Elwood Terry Poorman, was charged with a murder in Port Coquitlam, suggesting that the Indian Posse had reached the Lower Mainland of British Columbia. In 2019, Max Waddell of the Winnipeg Police Service blamed gang violence for the high murder in Winnipeg, saying that rivalries between First Nations gangs such as the Indian Posse, the Native Syndicate, and the Manitoba Warriors along with black gangs as the Mad Cowz were a major issue.

Brad Peequaquat, a member of the Saskatchewan's Yellow Quill First Nation, was recruited into an Indian Posse chapter with his brother Sherman, remembering: "They seemed to be young guys just like us. I just thought it'd be fun. We all joined.... They promised us this fast, easy life, but it wasn't. They were living off of us, and we were getting sick of everything." Sherman Peequaquat recalled that joining the IP: "The violence escalated, the stabbings and everything." Brad Peequaquat turned against the Indian Posse, which he stated led him nowhere as he spent his days living in fear as he never knew when he could be attacked. On 18 August 2019, an Indian Posse gangster, Craig Don Gladue, shot and killed in public a member of the rival Terror Squad in the parking lot of a McDonald's in Saskatoon. The Crown Attorney who prosecuted Gladue said of the killing: "It’s just the fact that they’re rival gangs that recognized ‘you’re wearing red, I’m wearing black, therefore I don’t like you,’ and just an immediate combative position and response to that visual of ‘you’re wearing a different colour than me, we have a problem now."

== The end of the Wolfe brothers ==
On 20 September 2007, Danny Wolfe was involved in a verbal dispute in a bar in Fort Qu'Appelle with Bernard Percy Pascal, a member of the rival Native Syndicate. Later the same night, Wolfe broke into Pascal's house and started shooting everybody he saw. He killed Michael Itittakoose and Marvin Arnault while wounding Pascal, Jesse Obey and Cordell Keepness. Friesen describe Wolfe's shooting rampage as motivated by his ego as he could not stand any personal slights, real or imagined, and after Pascal insulted him in the bar felt that only swift and blinding violence could avenge the blow to his ego.

While in jail awaiting his trial, Wolfe broke out from the Regina Correctional Centre on 24 August 2008 and was arrested three weeks later in Winnipeg. The manhunt for Danny Wolfe across the Prairies, who was described by the police as highly dangerous, attracted much media attention. During his three weeks of freedom, Wolfe returned to Winnipeg, where he engaged in much womanizing and substance abuse until in order to collect a reward an anonymous caller gave his location away to the police. In November 2009, Danny Wolfe was convicted of two counts of murder and three counts of attempted murder, being sentenced to 25 years in imprisonment.

Both the Wolfe brothers died in prison. While serving his life sentence in the Saskatchewan Penitentiary, Danny Wolfe was murdered by another prisoner on 4 January 2010. Richard Wolfe was convicted of attempting to murder a pizza delivery man in 1996, but was released on parole in 2010. Wolfe vowed to "go straight", but in 2013, he broke up with his girlfriend and started to abuse alcohol and drugs again. In November 2013, to prevent him from returning to prison, a couple gave him a home in their basement and attempted to help him turn his life around. On the night of 6 April 2014, Wolfe raped the woman and then attacked the man with a baseball bat after the man heard his wife screaming. In March 2015, he pleaded guilty to one count of rape and one count of assault with a deadly weapon. Owing to the dangers of attacks from rival gang members and for being a rapist, Wolfe was held in solitary confinement, causing him to suffer from severe depression, which contributed to his death from a heart-attack at the age of 40 on 27 May 2016.

== Books and articles ==
- Auger, Michel; Edwards, Peter (2012). The Encyclopedia of Canadian Organized Crime: From Captain Kidd to Mom Boucher. Toronto: McClelland & Stewart. ISBN 978-0771030499.
- Friesen, Joe (2016). The Ballad of Danny Wolfe: Life of a Modern Outlaw. Toronto: McClelland & Stewart. ISBN 9780771030314.
- Langton, Jerry (2010). Showdown: How the Outlaws, Hells Angels and Cops Fought for Control of the Streets. Toronto: John Wiley & Sons. ISBN 978-0470678787.
- Langton, Jerry (2015). Cold War: How Organized Crime Works in Canada and Why It's About to Get More Violent. Toronto: HarperColllins. ISBN 978-1-4434-3255-9.
- Sher, Julian; Marsden, William (2003). The Road To Hell: How the Biker Gangs Are Conquering Canada. Toronto: Alfred Knopf. ISBN 0-676-97598-4.
- Totten, Mark (2012). Nasty, Brutish, and Short: The Lives of Gang Members in Canada. Toronto: James Lorimer Publishers. ISBN 9781459400399.
