= Richard Wolfe =

Canadian gangster

- Born: Richard Daniel Wolfe Jr. Regina, Saskatchewan, Canada
- Died: May 27, 2016 (aged 40); Prince Albert, Saskatchewan, Canada
- Known for: Co-founding Indian Posse
- Convictions: Attempted murder, sexual assault, aggravated assault
- Penalty: 19 years in prison

Richard Daniel Wolfe (1975 – 27 May 2016) was a Canadian gangster who co-founded the Indian Posse gang along with his younger brother Danny Wolfe in 1988, which he later left in 1997. Convicted of attempted murder in 1995, he was released on parole in 2010. On parole in 2014, he sexually assaulted a woman and beat a man with a baseball bat. He died in prison.

== Youth ==
Wolfe was born on the Okanese First Nation in Saskatchewan, the son of Richard Wolfe Senior and Susan Creely. Both of his parents were Cree. In 1979, his parents moved to the North End, Winnipeg, where he grew up. His father abandoned his family while his mother was an alcoholic. In sentencing Richard Wolfe Jr. in 2015 following his convictions for sexual assault and assault, the judge stated: "He was raised in an environment where substance abuse and domestic violence was prevalent. Richard was repeatedly exposed to violence which occurred during his parents' house parties. He was sexually abused at the age of seven, once by a stranger and twice by a neighbor. The episodes of sexual abuse left Richard confused, ashamed and full of hate".

Along with his younger brother Danny, Richard scavenged for food from a garbage bin of a local Kentucky Fried Chicken as their mother spent her welfare cheques on alcohol, and scavenging for food was the only way the Wolfe brothers fed themselves. The Wolfe brothers raided the gardens kept by Portuguese immigrants to steal their tomatoes and carrots in the summertime and soon moved on to breaking into cars to steal any valuables that might be inside to raise money for food. Starting at the age of 9, Richard took to wearing a red bandana, which later became the symbol of the Indian Posse. For a class assignment about his future ambitions, he wrote "Richard-Wealthy and Powerful". Richard was placed "in care" at foster homes a number of times, and to escape the abuse always ran away. The journalist Jon Friesen wrote about the Wolfe brothers: "By the time they were about ten or eleven years old, Danny and Richard were quite accustomed to raising themselves. They had no regard for conventional rules or morality. They saw themselves as survivors and were prepared to do whatever it took to make it".

== Indian Posse ==
In the summer of 1988, Creely rented a house on Beverley Avenue in Winnipeg. Moving in with her were the two Wolfe brothers and their younger half-brother, Preston Buffalocalf. The Wolfe brothers lived in the basement of the house, and the Indian Posse still speaks of "the basement" to refer to the gang's origins. The Wolfe brothers belonged to a youth gang who called themselves Scammers Inc. In August 1988, the Wolfe brothers along with five other members of Scammers Inc decided to break away to found their own gang, which they named the Indian Posse. Richard said of the gang he founded: "We just wanted to make sure we stuck with each other and watched other's backs". One of the rules that Richard developed for his gang was that membership was for life, and that the penalty for leaving the Indian Posse would be death.

Richard's primary role in the Indian Posse at first was as a thief who specialized in stealing car stereos. Wolfe would brazenly break into garages, use a screwdriver to smash in one of the car windows, and then use the same screwdriver to remove the stereos. He sold the stolen stereos for $100 per system to the Triads in Winnipeg's Chinatown. Richard Wolfe started carrying a handgun to school at the age of 13, and after his gun was discovered by a teacher, resulted in his first criminal conviction on 2 February 1989.

By 1989, Richard moved on to breaking into houses. Richard would spend hours bicycling or walking around Winnipeg looking for a house that appeared unoccupied and then break in, looking for jewelry, electronics, CDs and cash to steal. Richard stated in an interview: "We didn't think about the people we were stealing from as being victimized or traumatized. There was none of that. I wanted what they had". By 1990, Wolfe was firmly committed to being a gangster. Under his leadership, the Indian Posse started to specialize in stealing cars and robbing gas stations in the North End at gunpoint. By 1992, the Wolfe brothers had rented a house for $866 per month and was selling drugs. The Wolfe brothers purchased drugs from native gangs in South Dakota or more commonly drove out to Vancouver to purchase cocaine from the Triads. The brothers Wolfe resented the position of the Indian Posse as street dealers who had to buy drugs from either Winnipeg's outlaw biker gangs, the Spartans or los Bravos or the Asian crime syndicates, usually the Triads, as street dealing was the least profitable and most dangerous position to be in the drug business. However, the lack of international connections left the Indian Posse no choice, but to purchase drugs from the gangs that did have the international connections.

To make his appointments on time with his probation officer, Richard would steal automobiles and would leave the stolen vehicle in the parking lot while he rushed to see his probation officer to assure him that he was not breaking any laws. The area around the Lord Selkirk Park Housing Development, known locally as "Little Chicago", was the primary area for Richard and other Indian Posse dealers to sell marijuana, LSD and cocaine. He usually used children from the Lord Selkirk Park Housing Development as his drug couriers. The principal area for drug sales was around the Merchant's Hotel, known locally as "the Merch", where the Indian Posse set up an open air drug market in 1991. An youth pastor at the Manitoba Youth Remand Centre who knew both Wolfe brothers stated that in the early 1990s Richard was the leader of the gang while Danny was his lackey. The pastor stated: "Richard always had that ability to be honest. Danny was very impressionable. He didn't have the smarts that Richard had". Danny served as his brother's enforcer, being involved in 14 shootings between 1990 and 1994. Friesen describing Danny as "Richard's loyal lieutenant and enforcer". Richard was involved in robbing armed cars and ATM machines, but those robberies were set up by one of Winnipeg's two outlaw biker gangs, the Spartans or los Bravos, who took the bulk of the profits with the Indian Posse serving as the flunkies for the bikers. The main sources of income for the Indian Posse in the 1990s were prostitution and selling drugs with robberies being a sideline activity.

The Wolfe brothers liked to dress in the style of the Afro-American gangs of Los Angeles who along with the West Coast gangsta rappers he idolized, wearing Nike shoes, baseball caps, and red jackets. Richard liked to show off his wallet full of hundreds of dollars to illustrate that he was now economically better off. Richard was often robbed by the corrupt Winnipeg police with policemen seizing about 40% of his cash. Wolfe stated in an interview that he be stopped by a policeman and: "They'd ask, 'how much you holding? I'd say '$1, 200'. They'd grab half and say, 'it looks more like $600'". Both the Wolfe brothers hated the Winnipeg police along with the Royal Canadian Mounted Police (Manitoba does not have its own provincial police). Richard stated he was twice taken "on a starlight tour" under which the police would arrest him in the dead of winter at night, take him to a remote rural area and tell him that he had to walk back to Winnipeg. After being taken on a "starlight tour" for a second time, which forced him to walk five miles at night in the wintertime, Richard planned to murder a policeman in revenge. Joined by his bloodthirsty younger brother who was always enthusiastic about violence and another Indian Posse member, Richard went out to hunt for a policeman to kill. Richard found a policeman in his cruiser and as he approached the officer, he recalled: "I was creeping along on the ground when I turned around to check on my brother and he's gesturing at the other guy, saying basically 'what about him?' My brother didn't really trust him". Richard abandoned the murder attempt as he decided that the man could not trusted to not turn Crown's evidence as he stated: "I'm glad I didn't do. My anger was getting the better of me". Unlike his womanizing younger brother, Richard had a stable long-term relationship with his girlfriend Colleen who passed his "beer test". Richard would invite girls to parties, saying they could bring just themselves or bring themselves along with beer. The girls who arrived without beer were considered by Richard to be snooty and self-centered. Colleen brought a case of 24 bottles of beer, which made her into Richard's girl. Detective James Jewell of the Winnipeg police said: "They had almost a Bonnie-and-Clyde reputation. Not a lot of women were trusted in the gang, but Colleen was Richard's right-hand girl. She participated in a lot of the crimes, which was unusual".

Richard would meet with the leaders of other gangs to negotiate agreements to push up the prices of drugs. Richard recalled in an interview: "We'd say to them, we know you're selling over here. How much for? They'd say $15. We'd say, okay, we're going to go over here and do the same fucking thing. That way we're on the same page...As long as everybody was making money, everyone was happy". Richard's cool temperament and his ability to "talk to the room" as he phrased it marked him out as an excellent diplomat who was able to handle relations with the other gangs, unlike his wilder younger brother Danny who was known for ungovernable rages and a tendency to act in a rash, violent way. Friesen wrote: "That kind of diplomacy in a sixteen-year-old is remarkable and it was one of Richard's strengths". Wolfe's favorite weapon was his AK-47 assault rifle, which he loved to fire during trips out to the countryside. In 1993, the Wolfe brothers were involved in a shoot-out with a rival gang, the Crips (no connection to the gang of the same name in Los Angeles), leading for Richard to take cover behind a tree while the more aggressive Danny stayed in the open while returning fire. Richard recalled: "I screamed 'take cover!' and he wouldn't take cover. Danny's just standing up, letting 'em go. Pow! Pow! Pow! The Crips fled when Richard pulled out a shotgun, but Danny was angry when he learned that shotgun was jammed. Danny berated his brother for not keeping his shotgun in working order. One day in 1993 when he was firing off his AK-47 at targets at a farm outside of Winnipeg, Richard asked Danny if he was would kill him for the sake of the Indian Posse. Richard recalled Danny's response: "Danny looked me right in the eyes and said, 'Yes I would. For the family'. We made this family and no matter what happened we would do what was right". In the Indian Posse, "taking a van ride" was a euphemism for an execution. Once, a group of Indian Posse gangsters arrived at Richard's house to tell him to board a van, leading Richard to calmly say "I'll get my coat, let's do this", leading him to be congratulated for his willingness to obey orders despite the apparent prospect of his demise.

In October 1993, the Indian Posse had its major gang war with another gang, the War Party. Richard made a ruse of an offer of surrender as he recalled in an interview: "We told him [the leader of the War Party] we wanted to sit down and make a deal with him, talk to him. We showed him two pounds of weed. We told him we're got more of this for you and your crew, but we need to talk about it. Come for a ride, He bit on the bait, sure enough". On Halloween 1993, the leaders of the War Party drove out to meet the Indian Posse leaders in a forest where they were ambushed and ordered to dig their own graves. Richard had seen how effective this tactic was from his experiences with the outlaw biker gangs, and as the leaders of the War Party begged for their lives as they went digging into the earth, Richard told them he would spare their lives in exchange for them joining the Indian Posse. As the leaders of the War Party stared at their own graves, they capitulated. Along with Danny, Richard rented an apartment on Redwood Avenue and set up a clubhouse on Pritchard Avenue. The Indian Posse came into conflict with another gang, the North End Brotherhood, over drug sales at the Merchant's Hotel, leading for Richard to tell them: "We make good money here. Either you guys go with us or we can go to war". The North End Brotherhood folded and joined the Indian Posse. On 9 February 1994, a member of a rival gang, the Overlords, shot at the house of an Indian Posse member, leading to a drive-by shooting in revenge later that night. The outbreak of gang violence with drive-by shootings led for the media to give more attention to the Indian Posse. In early 1994, Richard was convicted of drug charges and sent to Headingley Correctional Centre, where his main task to smuggle in drugs to sell to the other inmates.

In September 1994, Richard gave a jailhouse interview with the journalist Paul Wiecek of the Winnipeg Free Press. Richard read out to Wiecek a poem he had written that read: "Our color is red and it's here to stay, some of us have something to prove and some of us already have/But all in all we are the Indian Posse and together we stand tall/We are a breed that has seen it all and had its better days, but in the end we will learn our true native ways/We don't mean to disrespect our elders, but we want to stand proud like they did in our hearts/We are warriors and in ourselves we will survive the war path/In the days of old, our people used to fight and kill each other and as they did we will if there is no other way/We hold our heads high because we are not scared to die for one another, for we will join the Great Spirit in the sky/Call us what you will, but it is your racist blood we will spill/Brothers Forever Indian Posse". The interview caused a media sensation with Richard's threat of the Indian Posse mobilizing the First Nations underclass of Winnipeg into a revolutionary force against Canada being highlighted along with the line from his poem "it is your racist blood we will spill". For bringing unwanted attention onto the Indian Posse, Richard was beaten by his fellow Indian Posse gangsters.

In November 1994, Richard was released from Headingley and was placed in charge of the Indian Posse's prostitution racket. Richard argued that he was a kind pimp who allowed his prostitutes to keep 40% of their earnings instead of the normal 25%, and stated about his work as a pimp: "I treated them with respect. I didn't look down on them or anything". Richard admits that the Indian Posse forced girls as young as 10 and 11 to work as prostitutes, but insisted that he was appalled by the child prostitution even though he did nothing to stop it. Despite his position as the pimp-in-chief, he insisted that it was not his fault that his gang catered to the most depraved of sexual tastes. Wolfe stated in an interview: "I remember seeing little girls, one ten years old, working around Little Chicago, and I was shocked." The policeman James Jewell stated: "I always thought Richard was one of the most dangerous guys on the street...He was a force to be reckoned with".

== Slawik murder attempt ==
In April 1995, the police raided the house on Stella Avenue that the Wolfe brothers rented, looking for a 13-year-old boy who had run away. Richard was arrested as he tried to walk out the front door with his girlfriend Colleen while Danny was arrested in the living room. Found in the living room were 11 bundles of marijuana on the coffee table, leading to a policeman to ask: "Well, Richard, whose drugs are they?" The drugs belonged to Danny who had been sorting the marijuana into bags when the police arrived, but Richard felt he owned his brother a debt as Danny had confessed to the possession of stolen goods that actually belonged to Richard to spare him a prison term in 1993. Richard recalled that his girlfriend Colleen wanted him to blame Danny to keep him out of prison while "I looked at Danny and he wasn't saying nothing". Richard decided to take the fall for his brother and confessed to the police that the marijuana was his as he raised out his hands to be handcuffed. As Richard was marched out, Colleen became hysterical and screamed at the officers "They're mine! I'll take the charge!" Richard was able to make bail and was released again. The possibility that Richard might go to prison for a number of years as he had several prior drug convictions weakened his hold on the Indian Posse, and led him to decide on a dramatic gesture meant to underscore his authority.

Spencer LaPorte, an Indian Posse member, died of a drug overdose in November 1994, and Richard had inherited the US$60,000 drug debt owed to LaPorte by the owner of Jumbo Pizza. Like all gangsters, Richard was obsessed with his underworld reputation—a failure to force a debtor to pay would lead to other debtors defaulting. Conseuently Richard was willing to engage in extreme violence against a defaulting debtor to uphold his reputation, and by May 1995 he was notably annoyed with the owner of Jumbo Pizza who kept promising to pay the $60,000 without doing so. At 11:48 pm on 14 May 1995, Richard had his girlfriend Collen make a phone call to Jumbo Pizza in the name of LePorte, which was his way of saying that he expected the $60,000 that was owing to him to be delivered with the pizza. The call was placed from the apartment of a couple known as Christa and Darryl; it was common in the North End for people to not pay their phone bills and lose their phone services, then making their phone calls from friends' homes.

The pizza was to be delivered to an address on Pritchard Avenue near the Lord Selkirk Park Housing Development that Wolfe had selected as a good place for an ambush as the streets were dimly lit. Wolfe had expected the owner of Jumbo Pizza to make the delivery, but it was delivered by Maciej Slawik, a Polish immigrant uninvolved with crime who had been working at Jumbo Pizza for only two weeks. However, Wolfe decided that killing the deliveryman would send a message to his debtor. As Slawik was getting out of his car with the two pizzas, Wolfe stormed out of the shadows, wearing a black balaclava and told Slawik "give us your fucking money!" Before Slawik could do anything, Richard opened fire with his shotgun. The first shot missed, but Slawik was determined not to lose his car, and threw a soft drink can at Richard. The second shot fired by Wolfe hit Slawik and tore open a huge hole in his chest. Slawik attempted to walk for help, but soon collapsed due to blood loss. A teenage Indian Posse member stole Slawik's car along with the two boxes of pizza. Richard threw away his shotgun, ran down a dark alley and walked over to his apartment in The Micheal building on Redwood Avenue. Richard had expected to find $60,000 in cash in one of the pizza boxes and was surprised to find nothing. Richard was joined by Colleen, Darryl, Christa, Danny and the teenage thief. Speaking in a menacing tone, Richard told Darryl and Christa "you guys both know what to do when they show up?" Richard told Danny: "I fucked up. I have to bounce". Richard admitted that he lost the butt of his shotgun and was uncertain if his fingerprints were on it. Danny told Richard: "You fucking guy! You should've got somebody else to do that. We don't have to do that stuff no more". Richard burned his clothing and took a bath to wash away the gunpower residue. Richard was highly stressed that night as he expected to be arrested at any moment and paced his apartment obsessively as he brooded over any mistakes that he might had made that would incriminate him. Richard told Danny: "If I don't see you again, keep your head up and be strong". Richard also told Danny that he distrusted Darryl and Christa, whom he called a "shady" couple whom he believed would turn Crown's evidence, leading to Danny to ask why he used their phone to order the pizza . Detective James Jewell of the Winnipeg police was assigned to the case at 4:00 am on the same night. Because the order had been placed from the apartment of Christa and Darryl, the police went there first. The couple quickly named Richard Wolfe as the man who placed the call, and a warrant was issued for his arrest at about 6:30 am. Jewell searched the Micheal, but both of the Wolfe brothers had already fled. Jewell suspected that Richard had gone to the house of his girlfriend; he was found and arrested there. Under interrogation, Collen named Richard as the man who had shot Slawik. Jewell told Colleen that her boyfriend had been charged with attempted murder, telling her "that's no joke. That's about as serious as it gets". Jewell told Colleen that the teenager who served as the get-away driver had been charged with attempted murder, leading her to blurt out "attempted murder? He didn't do it!" Colleen told Jewell: "I don't want him going to jail. I'll take the rap for him. I'll take the charge". Jewell told her: "Look, Colleen, we just want the truth." Colleen confessed: "Okay, I made the call, but I wasn't there for it". Richard said nothing during his interrogation, but as he was being taken to his jail cell, he said that the shooting had been an accident. Richard felt confident that he would be acquitted as it was unlikely that Slawik could identify him, the police had not found the murder weapon, and he had burned the clothing he was wearing. The only evidence that linked him to the crime was the evidence of Darryl and Christa, who had named him as the instigator of the call to Jumbo Pizza. The next day, Richard called Danny to tell him that Darryl and Christa had turned crown's evidence and that he should change their minds about testifying against him. Danny went to see the couple and warned them that he would kill them if they testified against his brother.

Richard was denied bail and held at the Remand Centre. On 23 July 1995, a 13-year-old associated with the Indian Posse, Joseph "Beeper" Spence, was killed by members of the Nine-Deuces gang merely for being friends with the Indian Posse. Wolfe felt much guilt about Spence's murder, saying in a 2016 interview: "Beeper wasn't down with the IP. He just wanted to fit in. Just saying Indian Posse ended up getting him blasted in the back with a 12-gauge [shotgun]. It was really a turning point. That was when I actually started thinking about leaving the gang a lot". At his trial in 1996, he was found guilty of attempted murder and was sentenced to 19 years in prison. Despite the threats of Danny, both Darryl and Christa testified that Richard had Colleen make the pizza order from their apartment and had told them later the same night that he had shot Slawik. The attempted murder ruined Richard's underworld reputation as he had personally committed a crime that a crime boss would normally assign to subordinates. Furthermore, Richard had expected Slawik to have $60,000 on his person, but had shot him without even giving him a chance to hand over the expected money, which added to his reputation for being a man who acted rashly. None of Richard's family was present at his trial. His mother was drinking so heavily that she was not even aware that her son was on trial for attempted murder, and first learned of his conviction five years later in 2001; his father was in Prince Albert living on the streets; and Danny was in prison following his conviction for obstruction of justice for threatening to kill Darryl and Christa.

== In prison ==
Wolfe was first sent to Stony Mountain Institution to serve his sentence, and then at the beginning of 1997 was sent to Edmonton Institution. He felt uncomfortable as he was placed in handcuffs in a bus seat surrounded by plastic walls to keep him from having contact with the other prisoners. During the long bus ride, he was held in this manner for the entire trip, which underscored to him that he now had less rights than the people who were not violent criminals like himself. Wolfe found Edmonton Institution to be far more harsher prison than Stony Mountain along with being a more violent prison where the prisoners constantly killing each other via the "shanks" (homemade knives) that they fashioned out of whatever metal they could find. Even the other Indian Posse prisoners made it clear to Wolfe that they disapproved of him for his 1994 interview with the Winnipeg Free Press which made the Indian Posse infamous throughout western Canada, and hence drew more police attention. In addition, some prisoners confused Richard Wolfe Jr. with Richard Wolfe Sr. who had two convictions for rape. In Canadian prisons, inmates who commit sexual assault are considered to be the lowest of the low, and are hated by the other prisoners. Wolfe had to assure the Indian Posse inmates that the newspaper stories about a Richard Wolfe who had been convicted of rape twice were about his father, not him.

Wolfe tried to hide his disenchantment with his gang, saying: "I had to try and hide it. Especially making decisions on things that were happening in prison. I couldn't show any weakness because then red flags would go up on me....I wanted out. That Beeper thing was laying heavy on my head". Wolfe met with three other members of the ruling "circle" (council) where he asked for permission to leave the Indian Posse, saying the gang was becoming too violent. The three members of the "circle" were unhappy with his decision as they noted that Wolfe's own rules stated that Indian Posse membership was for life and that any members who attempted to leave would be killed. As the trio discussed the fate of Wolfe outside of his cell, he read books on First Nations history and culture while anxiously keeping his eyes on the three men who held his life in balance. The three returned to tell Wolfe that he had to submit to a beating to punish him for leaving the gang, but that he would not be killed. Shortly afterwards, a friend of Wolfe told him that a jailhouse contract had been placed on his life by the ruling "circle" who were determined to uphold the rules that the Wolfe brothers had devised themselves. Wolfe told his friend: "I said, 'alright. Step aside brother. If it is going down, then it's going down. I ain't going anywhere'". Wolfe lived in fear, keeping two "shanks" (homemade knives) on his person at all time, refused to go into the exercise area and always ate his meals with his back to the wall. He said: "I wasn't going to make it easy for them".

Wolfe received a photograph of the North End along with the message of "You must be homesick. Here's a picture of the North End". Thinking that the man who gave him the photograph was a friend, Wolfe played cards with him one evening. Wolfe briefly departed his cell to the use the washroom and when he returned he found his friend had taken his place with his back to the wall, forcing Wolfe to sit with his back to the doorway. As Wolfe resumed the card game, an Indian Posse member rushed in to strangle him from behind while the cardplayer began to punch him in the face and chest, saying it was time to die for leaving the Indian Posse. As Wolfe struggled to reach his "shanks", another inmate closed the door and put a blanket over the glass wall that severed his cell from the hallway. The fury of the blows to his face forced him to his knees and then one of the attackers pulled out a "shank". Despite his screams, the man plunged the "shank" into Wolfe's body five times, into his side, in the back, in the arm and in the chest. Wolfe collapsed into a pool of his blood when the attack was abandoned when one of the guards entered the cell when he noticed that a blanket had placed over the glass wall via a security camera, leading him to suspect that something illegal was happening. Though Wolfe was a "spluttering, bloodied mess", none of the knife blows had stuck any vital organs.

As Wolfe was recovering in the prison hospital, one of the co-founders of the Indian Posse, a man known only as Lawrence, approached him by his bedside to seek assurances that Wolfe would follow the underworld code and never turn Crown's evidence. Lawrence told Wolfe that he heard rumors that Wolfe would testify against the men who tried to kill him Lawrence added that he knew Wolfe was a "solid dude" who must not testify for the Crown against the men who tried to kill him. Knowing that the room was probably bugged, Lawrence made up the pretense that the attack was the work of white prisoners, and Wolfe played along, saying it was a racial attack that the Indian Posse was not involved in. Much against his will, Wolfe was placed in the segregation unit for his own protection. Wolfe received a message that the jailhouse contract would be cancelled and he could rejoin the Indian Posse if he murdered another prisoner, an offer he refused. In late 1997, Wolfe was sent to the Drumheller Institution, which had no Indian Posse members serving their sentences at the time, for his own safety. However, the Drumheller prison had a chapter of the Aryan Brotherhood who were keen to kill such a well known First Nations prisoner. Wolfe continued to live in fear, always on the watch-out for a potential killer everyday, which proved to be extremely stressful for him. He received a letter from a friend in Winnipeg who warned him that the Indian Posse was sending a killer to the Drumheller prison to kill him, which led for Wolfe to be especially fearful whenever a bus full of new inmates arrived.

Knowing of his gang's modus operandi, Wolfe decided that his killer would be an young Indian Posse gangster who was anxious for promotion and he would be transferred from Stony Mountain to Drumheller. When a young man from Stony Mountain arrived at Drumheller, Wolfe decided that he must had been the assassin sent to kill him. In an interview, Wolfe stated: "I think it was probably three days just waiting, deciding what to do. then I thought, you know what, I'm not going to wait any longer 'cause he might get me. So I went to get him". Wolfe went into the man's cell while he was asleep and attacked him in his bed with his shank, stabbing him repeatedly in the chest. The guards saved the young man's life, and Wolfe was convicted of attempted murder again, receiving an extra two years to his 19 year old sentence. It turned out that the man whom Wolfe had almost killed was not an Indian Posse member nor was he an assassin. Danny in a letter offered to himself transferred over to Drumheller to protect his older brother, but Richard declined as he believed that Danny would kill him as his loyalty to the Indian Posse outweighed his loyalty to his brother. Despite Danny's statement in a letter that "get over it, man, you're fucking paranoid", Richard continued to fear his younger brother would kill him. For his protection, Wolfe was moved to a prison in Ontario in 1999, where Indian Posse prisoners were rare. Reflecting his hatred of Canada, Wolfe hung a Canadian flag upside down in his cell, had a tattoo of the maple leaf upside down inked onto his arm, and always mailed his letters with his stamps upside down. In Ontario, Wolfe became an ally of the Mafia, associating with imprisoned Mafiosi who taught him Italian cooking and placed him under their "protection" (meaning that anyone who killed Wolfe would be in turn killed by the Mafia). Wolfe was respected by the Mafiosi for founding the Indian Posse, which had become the largest street gang in Canada, and he was allowed to live in the Mafia wing of the prison.

== Sexual assault ==
In January 2010, Wolfe learned that Danny had been killed in prison. He had last seen Danny in 1996, and his request to attend his funeral was denied. Richard Wolfe was released on parole in 2010. Wolfe vowed to "go straight", but in 2013 his girlfriend found out he abused her daughters and kicked him out which led to the abuse alcohol and drugs again. The catalyst for his downward spiral was being kicked out, broken up with and being called on his abuse, which led him back into substance abuse. In November 2013, to prevent him from returning to prison, a couple gave him a home in their basement and attempted to help him turn his life around. On the night of 6 April 2014, Wolfe sexually assaulted the woman and then attacked the man with a baseball bat after the man heard his girlfriend screaming. The woman was asleep and woke up to find that Wolfe was holding down while sexually assaulting her. As her boyfriend raced to protect her, Wolfe beat him with a baseball bat so viciously that he suffered brain damage and has difficulty walking. The woman he assaulted stated in court: "I'm scared to trust anyone and everyone." For this violation of his parole, Wolfe was sent back to prison where he died in 2016.

On 9 March 2015, he pleaded guilty to one count of sexual assault and one count of assault with a deadly weapon. Owing to the dangers of attacks from rival gang members and for committing sexual assault, Wolfe was held in solitary confinement, causing him to suffer from severe depression, which contributed to his death from a heart-attack at the age of 40 on 27 May 2016. Wolfe asked a number of times to be taken out of solitary confinement, saying that being alone in his cell nearly all the time for months on end was deeply depressing. The journalist Paul Wiecek whose interview with Wolfe in 1994 made him famous wrote in 2016 against the glorification of Wolfe as a hero. Wiecek wrote:

the Wolfe legend only continues to grow as authors, journalists, filmmakers and academics continue to try to attach some broader sociological — even anthropological — significance to the Wolfes and the Indian Posse. In that world, these young gentlemen weren't in a gang but rather in a "surrogate family." Their drug trafficking was simply the manifestation of generations of resentment towards a country that had marginalized their people. And the pimping? Residential schools, I guess. It is the worst kind of historical revisionism. It is an insult to aboriginal people everywhere. But it is also exactly the kind of stuff that sounds good over a chilled glass of Chardonnay in a café with your fellow intellectuals. Listen, I was there at the time — Richard Wolfe was no Malcolm X and the Indian Posse weren't the Black Panthers...Wolfe and his brother were smarter than those idiots, but the idea of the Wolfes as either a fulsome expression of the alienation of indigenous peoples and/or criminal masterminds is an intellectual dishonesty of the highest order. The Wolfes were just thugs, and not particularly sophisticated ones at that.

== Books ==
- Auger, Michel; Edwards, Peter (2012). The Encyclopedia of Canadian Organized Crime: From Captain Kidd to Mom Boucher. Toronto: McClelland & Stewart. ISBN 978-0771030499.
- Friesen, Joe (2016). The Ballad of Danny Wolfe Life of a Modern Outlaw. Toronto: McClelland & Stewart. ISBN 9780771030314.
