= Indigenous-based organized crime =

Gangs with significant indigenous Canadian membership

Indigenous-based organized crime (IBOC), formerly known as Aboriginal-based organized crime (ABOC), is a term used to refer to Canadian criminal organizations which have a significant percentage of indigenous members. These organizations are primarily found in the prairie provinces, which tend to have areas with high concentrations of people of indigenous descent. IBOC is an important national monitored issue, as defined by Criminal Intelligence Service Canada.

== Criminal activities ==
There is confusion about how to properly intervene in preventing the growth of these gangs. One approach in Winnipeg recommended an all-indigenous school board in the face of increased gang involvement by indigenous youth. These schools are viewed as a means of increasing respect for traditional indigenous values while allowing youth to avoid involvement in gangs. There is caution toward such strategies due to the fear that these schools, purely as an anti-crime initiative, will lead to ghettoization. The thought of creating an indigenous school system struck some as reeking of segregation. Similar initiatives have been discussed in Saskatchewan, leading to a recommendation by the Federation of Saskatchewan Indian Nations in late 2009.

== Indigenous street gangs ==
Indigenous gangs, as the Criminal Intelligence Service Canada classifies them, have surpassed outlaw motorcycle gangs and Italian organized crime syndicates as the largest single group held in federal prisons, with 1,936 members serving federal sentences. Examples include:

- Alberta Warriors
- Indian Mafia
- Indian Posse
- Kelowna Warriors
- Manitoba Warriors
- Most Organized Brothers
- Native Syndicate
- Native Syndicate Killers
- Redd Alert
- Saskatchewan Warriors
- Terror Squad
- Terror Squad Killers

== See also ==
- Indigenous Canadians and crime
