= Saskatchewan Penitentiary =

Prison in Canada

- Interactive map of Saskatchewan Penitentiary
- Location: Prince Albert No. 461, Saskatchewan, Canada; 53°11′51″N 105°48′54″W
- Status: Operational
- Security class: Medium to maximum
- Opened: May 15, 1911
- Managed by: Correctional Service of Canada
- Website: csc-scc.gc.ca/institutions/001002-4012-eng.shtml

Saskatchewan Penitentiary is a Medium Security Facility with Maximum Security areas. It is located on a walled 20-acre (81,000 m^{2}) parcel of land in the Rural Municipality of Prince Albert No. 461, one kilometre west of Prince Albert, Saskatchewan, Canada. It opened in 1911 built on the site of a former residential school run by the Anglican Church of Canada.

== Units ==
Within the facility there are six operational units: Special Handling, Intake Assessment, Segregation, Mental Health Living, and Programs. A Special Handling Unit closed down in 1997, and the vacated space became integrated into a long-planned maximum security unit. Currently, however, it contains an Intake Assessment Unit as well as a Segregation Unit. There is a pilot project with a partnership of Aboriginal Elders to stop the segregation of Aboriginal inmates where practical and desirable.

There is also a Mental Health Unit with 25 beds. This unit provides psychiatric and counseling services to inmates with mental health concerns. A vocational concrete shop has been established for mentally ill and low functioning prisoners to help gain employment and social skills.

== Programs ==
There are a wide range of programs offered to the inmates to effectively manage their sentences. The Riverbend Institution and the Prince Albert Grand Council (PAGC), a Section 81 Healing Lodge, are located close to the facility. Other programs are listed as community services and include: Escorted Escorted Temporary Absence (ETA), Work Release, and Unescorted Temporary Absence (UTA).

Since the number of Aboriginal people is high in this facility there are many Aboriginal-directed programs. Two other divisions with inmate services are the CORCAN, and the Management Services, which both provide job training and employment opportunities (on-site employment and Community Releases).

== Inmate population ==
On April 6, 2004, the facility had a rated capacity of 573. This is a list of offenders by year:

- 2000: 499
- 2001: 527
- 2002: 544
- 2003: 518
- 2004: 541
- 2007: 600

== Riverbend Institution ==
Riverbend Institution is a minimum security facility that houses conditionally released offenders who have residency requirements. The institution is made up of twenty self-contained units, as well as two rooms to address the needs of handicapped offenders. This institution provides many work placement opportunities including maintenance, shops, and the CORCAN farming operation. It opened in 1962, and has a rated capacity of 162, but only housed 92 in 2004.

Riverbend Institution is located one kilometre west of Prince Albert on 0.081 square kilometres of land. This is a multi-purpose operation including pasture, forage, and gardening. The facility offers several additional services including Admission & Discharge, Health Care, Finance, Sentence Administration, and Personnel. These services are shared between Riverbend Institution and the penitentiary.

Occupants in each year:

- 2004: 92
- 2003: 115
- 2002: 86
- 2001: 115
- 2000: 114

== Major incidents ==
- In March 1991, three inmates took two staff members and one inmate hostage (Gordon Matthews) for over twenty-two hours. The incident ended when members of the Emergency Response Team shot and killed two of the three hostage takers.
- On January 4, 2010, one inmate was killed and two more were injured when a fight broke out in the maximum security area of the prison. The murdered victim was Danny Wolfe, co-founder of the Indian Posse.
- On March 9, 2010, an inmate in the maximum security unit was killed in the Saskatchewan Penitentiary (Prince Albert). The victim, who was being charged with aggravated sexual assault, had only served 5 days of his sentence before being beaten to death. One inmate was charged with second degree murder.
- On October 8, 2010, nearly 30 inmates brawled, leaving one man dead (as a result of his injuries). He was serving a sentence for dangerous operation of a motor vehicle causing death and failing to comply with a probation order. The fight took place in a medium-security unit.

=== 2016 riot ===
On December 14, 2016, a riot by over 100 inmates in the medium-security wing led to the murder (by stabbing) of 43-year-old Jason Leonard Bird, the assault of three other inmates, the hospitalization of 8 inmates, and caused 3.5 million dollars physical damage to the facility.

The RCMP conducted an 18-month investigation which led to the arrest and charge of 5 men with second-degree murder and attempted murder. A total of 16 men, identified as among the 21 initiators, were moved to a maximum-security prison. A 2018 report by the Correctional Services Canada's (CSC) National Board of Investigation found that issues relating to prison management, negotiations over food service work, and "the presence of an influential inmate personality who had a history of inciting other inmates to act out" had contributed to the riot.

While the 2018 CSC report was being prepared, Canada's correctional investigator Ivan Zinger, insisted that an internal review by the CSC was insufficient. Zinger's 2017 annual report suggested the riot had been born of unresolved demands by prisoners, small food portion sizes and poor food quality, as well as cramped conditions and over-crowding. He noted that the some sections of the prison failed to meet international human rights standards. Zinger's 2018 annual report featured a special section on the 2016 riot, concluded that the CSC's internal report "lacked transparency and credibility." Zinger insisted that the CSC report was superficial (interviewing only one inmate) and self-serving for failing to adequately address the issue of food, or to investigate the role of gangs in the riot.
