= Headingley Correctional Institution =

Prison in Manitoba, Canada

Headingley Correctional Centre
- Location within Manitoba
- Location: 6030 Portage Ave, Headingley, Manitoba R4H 1E8; 49°52′15″N 97°26′15″W
- Security class: minimum, medium and maximum
- Capacity: 549 adult males
- Opened: 1931
- Former name: Headingley Correctional Institution
- Managed by: Manitoba Corrections

The Headingley Correctional Centre (formerly Headingley Correctional Institution and Headingley Gaol) is a provincial prison in the Rural Municipality of Headingley, Manitoba. Administered by Manitoba Corrections, it has minimum, medium, and maximum security facilities for a rated population of 549 adult males.

== History ==
Headingley Gaol was opened in October 1930, with 48 staff and 270 inmates who had been moved from other institutions. At first holding both males and females, Headingley became a males-only facility in 1931, when females were sent to Portage la Prairie.

Capital punishment, via hangings, were carried out at Headingley from 1932 to 1952, wherein a total of 25 hangings were carried out, including the execution of two axe murderers in May 1934.

=== Riots ===
Throughout the 1930s, there were 4 minor inmate revolts, and one in each of the 1940s, 1950s, and 1960s. Disturbances also occurred in 1971 and 1983.

The most serious of all the riots to have taken place at Headingley broke out at 11:00 pm on 25 April 1996 and continued for 24 hours. The riot broke out as members of the rival Manitoba Warriors and Indian Posse gangs fought each other. A group of inmates controlled the prison over the course of two days. Eventually, 321 prisoners surrendered after rampaging, setting fires, and brutally attacking guards and inmates. While no one was killed, 8 guards and several prisoners were injured, some seriously, and were taken to Grace Hospital in Winnipeg; one prisoner lost fingers and another was almost castrated. The facility itself was extensively damaged, requiring months of repairs before inmates were returned; damage to the prison was estimated at $3.5 million, with renovations adding up to more than $10 million.

All of the inmates were moved to Stony Mountain Penitentiary, Brandon Correctional Institute, or the Winnipeg Remand Centre. Subsequent police reports suggested that the riot seemed to target inmates who were either informants or segregated because of sex crimes.

== Notable inmates ==
- Ole Thestrup — A Danish actor imprisoned in 1988 after he caused a disruption on board a British Airways flight from London to Los Angeles which was forced to make an emergency landing in Winnipeg.
- Peter Nygard — Clothing designer, entrepreneur and accused sex trafficker. Is currently jailed at Headingley while awaiting extradition to the United States to face sex trafficking charges.
