= Manitoba Warriors =

Indigenous street gang in Winnipeg, Canada

- Founded: 1993; 33 years ago
- Founding location: Stony Mountain Institution, Manitoba, Canada
- Years active: 1993–present
- Territory: Winnipeg
- Ethnicity: Indigenous Canadian
- Membership (est.): approximately 300-450
- Activities: Drug trafficking, weapon trafficking, prostitution, murder
- Allies: Hells Angels MC
- Rivals: Indian Posse

The Manitoba Warriors (MW) are an indigenous street gang based in Winnipeg, Manitoba, Canada. Predominantly based in the Central and North End neighbourhoods of the city, the gang is an exclusively indigenous Canadian organization that was established on the Lake Manitoba First Nation in 1993 to rival the Indian Posse gang.

Criminal Intelligence Service Canada (CISC) has designated the Manitoba Warriors as being a faction of indigenous-based organized crime (IBOC). CISC asserts that the gang, in addition to engaging in marijuana cultivation, auto theft, illegal firearms activities, gambling, and drug trafficking, also supports and facilitates criminal activities for the Hells Angels motorcycle gang and Asian-based networks.

== History ==
=== Origins ===
The Manitoba Warriors were formed as a prison gang in 1992, originating as an exclusively Aboriginal criminal organization at the Stony Mountain Institution. The gang was founded by William Pangman who served as the national president alongside Izzy Vermette who served as the national treasurer and Ervin Chartrand who served as the vice president. The name was taken from a minor league hockey team, the Pine Creek Warriors, as many of its members came from the Pine Creek reserve.

They created the MW to protect Native and Metis inmates and to rival traditional prison gangs. As incarcerated members were released, they recruited disenfranchised, young Aboriginals from their neighbourhoods. Unlike other Aboriginal gangs, they chose a structure similar to that found in outlaw biker culture. Each member holds a specific ranking, similar to the ranks found in outlaw biker clubs. However, according to former president Brian Contois, the Warriors were founded on a code of ethics aimed at bringing some level of morality, pride, and dignity to a way of life that would otherwise be unobtainable to these youth. This gang lifestyle promised them employment, money and brotherhood. By creating this place to find their identity there was a boom of recruitment, which might explain the variations in the MW's actual size. There are 300 active members listed in the City of Winnipeg's gang unit database and a further 140 inactive. The Manitoba Warriors are typically located in the central and northern suburbs of Winnipeg. Other organizations that have adopted the "Warriors" banner such as the Alberta and Saskatchewan Warriors, helped spread the gang's influence to other cities. However, their turf is not exclusive to these areas, and the Warriors also have a substantial prison network.

Chartrand who later left the gang stated the Manitoba Warriors were locked into struggles with "pretty much every gang in the city" in the early 1990s. Ultimately, the need for allies led to the Warriors to absorb the Overlords gang into their ranks and to form an alliance with los Bravos biker gang. The Overlords had been feuding with the Indian Posse, and the Manitoba Warriors inherited the feud when the Overlords joined their gang. The Manitoba Warriors purchased their drugs from los Bravos biker gang led by Ernie Dew. When Dew and the rest of los Bravos gang joined the Hells Angels in December 2000, the same relationship continued with the Angels as the senior partner and the Warriors as the junior partners.

The Manitoba Warriors began rejecting the structure of similar rival gangs and instead their organization is structured similar to outlaw motorcycle clubs. Senior members' ranks are indicated by tattoos and titles including a president, vice-president and sergeant-at-arms. Prospective members are apprentices before they become a fully fledged members, analogous to the process of "striking" in biker gangs. After the police operation Northern Snow the Warriors changed from classic biker culture and formed three distinct cells the Ruthless Warriors, Central Warriors. The strategy behind this was that if one of the cells is compromised by a police interdiction it would not affect the other cells. A short time later they scrapped the three-cell strategy and returned to a single cohesive organization, because rival organizations were expanding too quickly for the three separate cells. The Warriors reinstated leadership titles and a new "council" of high-ranking members was created to make decisions and pass down orders to other members in a way that protected the council from direct involvement in crime.

=== Expansion ===
Throughout the years there has been a violent rivalry between the Indian Posse and the Manitoba Warriors. The Manitoba Warriors met their first rivals in the form of the Indian Posse. On April 25, 1996, the Manitoba Warriors and the Indian Posse members got into an altercation at the Headingley Correctional Institution, causing a riot. The riot lasted 8 hours and caused approximately seven million dollars in damages. Eight guards and 31 inmates were injured in the riot. The Headingly riot made the reputation of the Manitoba Warriors, and led to a flood of new recruits in Winnipeg. The journalist Jerry Langton noted that as the Warriors lacked "a cohesive conduit to large quantities of high-profit drugs like cocaine and meth, the Warriors remained small-time-out of prison, at least".

In June 1996, a member of the Manitoba Warriors, James Delomre, sold to a member of los Bravos biker gang, Robert Sanderson, the right to have an 18-year old woman work as a prostitute for him. She later turned Crown's evidence and testified that Sanderson along with Robert Tew called a Manitoba Warriors drug house a "booze can" and referred to a drug dealer Russell Krowetz-who was living there-as the "big goof". She also testified that Sanderson, Tew and Roger Sanderson (no relation to Robert Sanderson) had armed themselves and went to the drug house to rob and kill Krowetz.

On 6 August 1996, three drug dealers known to be working for the Hells Angels were killed at a drug house owned by the Manitoba Warriors. At a house on Semple Avenue in the West Kildonan neighborhood of Winnipeg, a German immigrant, Mattias Zurstegge, discovered his son, Stefen Heinz Zurstegge, bleeding badly. Stefan Zurstegge had been shot twice, stabbed 34 times and had his left eye ripped out from the socket. Zurstegge then discovered Jason Joseph Gross in the laundry room with his face bashed into a bloody pulp. Both the younger Zurstegge and Gross were barely alive. In the basement was found the corpse of Thomas Russell Krowetz who had been shot in the chest, right thigh, and buttocks; stabbed 36 times; and his face had been bashed in with a baseball bat. Krowetz, an "unnaturally" large man owing to his steroid abuse who weighed 250 pounds, was found curled up in a fetal position as he been tortured for several hours before his death. Both Gross and the younger Zurstegge died on the ambulance that was taking them to the hospital due to blood loss. Krowetz was not a member of the Hells Angels, but was known to be a close associate of the Hells Angels Montreal chapter, from whom he purchased drugs. Tew and both Sandersons were convicted of first-degree murder in 1997 on the basis of the clothing and baseball caps stained with the blood of the victims found in Sanderson's car along with the testimony of the victim of the prostitution scheme. Roger Sanderson was acquitted on an appeal in 2005. In 2023, the conviction of Robert Sanderson was referred to an appeal court after the federal justice minister David Lametti declared it was a "likely miscarriage of justice".

A few weeks after the murder of Krowetz, the Manitoba Warriors murdered a drug dealer, John Henry Bear. Like Krowetz, Bear purchased from his drugs from the Hells Angels. Three men wearing blue bandannas (the color of the Manitoba Warriors) stormed into a rooming house and demanded to see Bear. After finding him hiding in a closet, he was pulled out and executed with a handgun for selling his drugs below the prices set by the Manitoba Warriors. A number of First Nations leaders such as Elijah Harper and Ovide Mercredi negotiated a truce between the Manitoba Warriors and the Indian Posse in March 1997. The truce nearly broke down when 8 Manitoba Warriors beat to death with baseball bats an 18-year-old Indian Posse member, Terry Acoby. The truce held however, and both the Indian Posse and Manitoba Warriors continued to recruit First Nations youth to work as drug dealers; expanded into northern Ontario; and formed alliances with los Bravos and the Hells Angels.

In 1996, a dispute broke at the Waterhen reserve with the band chief, Harvey Nepinak, being accused of embezzlement. Nepinak refused to open the band council's financial records and instead used the band council funds to move himself and his supporters to a hotel in Dauphin. The federal government refused to intervene under the grounds that the dispute was an internal affair of the Waterhen reserve. The anti-Nepinak faction hired the Manitoba Warriors to serve as alternative police force on the Waterhen reserve to counter the reserve's police force that was loyal to Nepinak. The Criminal Intelligence Service of Canada used the Waterhen reserve dispute as an example of how the government had lost all respect in First Nations communities to such an extent that it was considered acceptable to have a criminal organization serve as an unofficial police force on a reserve. In October 1996, Ovide Mercredi, the national chief of the Assembly of First Nations, met with the leaders of both the Manitoba Warriors and the Indian Posse. Afterwards, Mercredi stated he "was convinced the young aboriginal men representing these gangs were the true leaders in their community". Don Lett of the Winnipeg Free Press wrote: "Mercredi said he found he found the gang members unexpectedly spiritual and fully engaged in aboriginal culture and prayers. Sessions in jail usually opened with a prayer and with the burning of the sweet grass. The gang members claimed they had banded together to create a sense of brotherhood or collective security against a world many of them felt had excluded from basic opportunities to learn and work". Mercredi later apologized for his remarks as he stated that gangs such as the Indian Posse and the Manitoba Warriors were "disastrous" for First Nations communities.

There have been three major operations against the Manitoba Warriors starting with Operation Northern Snow in 1998. The police then launched Project Octopus after finding out that the Warriors were exploiting Government funding for a homelessness initiative called Paa Pii Wak. The journalist Jerry Langton wrote "the Warriors had a brutal reputation". A number of Manitoba Warriors were accused of the extremely vicious gang rape and murder of the 16-year old Brigitte Grenier at an outdoor rock concert. Two Warriors, Kyle Unger and Timothy Houlahan, were charged with the rape and murder of Grenier, but were acquitted. Another well known case concerned a Manitoba Warrior, Bernard Cook, who tried to leave the gang after experiencing a spiritual awakening, which led to his torture and murder.

   The Manitoba Warriors have had a long-time rivalry with, both, The Indian Posse & Native Syndicate since the early-to-mid 1990s but during the 2000s, new gangs began to emerge like rival Bloods sets & the afro-canadian-based gang, The Madcowz, were pushing for their piece of the drug trade which led to several skirmishes in the Winnipeg's North-End and West Central neighborhoods. The Manitoba Warriors and The Most Organized Brothers (MOB) were once affiliated with each other but due to an unspecified "blow out", the alliance fell apart which led to tension of bad blood between both gangs.

== Investigations and prosecutions ==
=== Operation Northern Snow ===
In 1998, the Winnipeg police were given the authority to begin a long investigation called Operation Northern Snow to counter the gang's drug trafficking. Thirty-five gang members were arrested and charged under new federal anti-gang legislation and held in a maximum security court house without the option for bail. Some members spent 20 months in jail waiting for trial and for 10 of those months they were being transported back and forth to the court house to plead their innocence. The case fell apart because of the length of time it took the Crown to begin the case. Some of the accused were released after their time imprisoned awaiting trial. Others faced an additional 18 months, and 22 of the accused accepted plea bargains. The Manitoba Warriors' growth was slowed by Operation Northern Snow with the accused all making plea bargains with the Crown. Much of the testimony presented the Warriors as sordid and cruel. It emerged during the Northern Snow trial that one Warrior, Steven Darren Traverse, forced a drug dealer to knee on all fours and made him "bark like a dog" while using a knife to carve designs into his back. The ordeal ended with Traverse plunging the knife into the man's back while kicking him in the face with his steel-toed boots for "not barking loud enough". Langton wrote that the Northern Snow trial "...deal a crippling blow to the Manitoba Warriors and news of the accused's poverty and poor decision making led to a severe loss of credibility on the streets". For a time, los Bravos biker gang refused to do business with the Manitoba Warriors, cutting them off from their most important source of illegal drugs.

The Manitoba Warriors have been known to work with and align themselves with other criminal organizations. Saskatchewan Warriors, Alberta Warriors, CENTRAL, Loyalty Honour Silence and MOB Squad are some of their more well known affiliations. The Manitoba Warriors created the Warriors banner that was adopted to create new criminal organizations. Criminal Organizations like the Alberta Warriors and Saskatchewan Warriors originally adopted this banner under the Manitoba Warriors and have since separated and expanded. Saskatchewan Warriors originally worked for the MW but have become a separate affiliated criminal organization. The SW is also an Aboriginal street gang that are active mainly in the Regina, Saskatoon and Prince Albert areas of Saskatchewan. Although MW and SW are in separate cities with similar street codes the AW SW gangs, they have been known to work together from time to time.

One of the Warriors most recent setbacks was a raid, labeled Project Falling Star, resulting in the arrest of 57 members and associates. As the Warriors expanded out of prison into Winnipeg and the surrounding area they also expanded their prison network. Their main territories are in the Central and North End neighborhoods of Winnipeg.

=== Project Octopus ===
In 2008, the police were again involved in an investigation into the Manitoba Warriors, who were becoming a notorious street gang. The RCMP alerted the Winnipeg Police that the Manitoba Warriors were exploiting government funding for a "homeless" initiative called Paa Pii Wak. The investigation was launched in December 2008 and it did not take long for it to become clear that the Manitoba Warriors were using Paa Pii Wak to further their criminal activities.

The police started an investigation and soon discovered that Paa Pii Wak half-way house had been taken over by the Manitoba Warriors. Much of the staff of Paa Pii Wak were members of the Warriors, who used their positions to recruit new members from the youth seeking help at Paa Pii Wak. The Winnipeg Police discovered that Paa Pii Wak had 1200 beds and was supposed to accept all, but that the staff usually turned away homeless people, even in the depths of winter. One policeman, Wes Law, told the Winnipeg Free Press: "It was like, sorry, unless you're a friend of the Manitoba Warriors, you're not staying here. If you're just some cold homeless guy, beat it. This was a multimillion-dollar corporation, over the course of its lifespan, being run by the Manitoba Warriors. The Manitoba Warriors were using Paa Pii Wak to further their criminal enterprise".

Alcohol was banned from Paa Pii Wak, but the police discovered numerous drinking parties at Paa Pii Wak along with cocaine deals. James Jewell of the Winnipeg police stated: "When you have a situation when you're empowering gang members or gang-member associates to conduct supervision of people released from our courts, clearly that's a flawed concept. Evidence of drinking on site, we also found what we believe are cocaine dial-a-dealers attending to the premises and things of that nature". Paa Pii Wak was cut off from its government funding as a result, which led to accusations of racism being made against the Winnipeg police.

The investigation showed that the Warriors exploited Paa Pii Wak in a few different ways. They used the organization to give active gang members and associates a legitimate source of income. It also gave gang members the ability to supervise gang members on court ordered release and gave the MW a way to extract active gang members from the centre. It also gave the Manitoba Warriors the ability to amend court orders rendering them ineffective. It was also known that the "staff" permitted the use of alcohol and drugs in the shelter. This was a real blow for the Homeless community because the Paa Pii Wak facilities that were supposed to help them were being used by a criminal organization.

== Books ==
- Auger, Michel; Edwards, Peter (2012). The Encyclopedia of Canadian Organized Crime: From Captain Kidd to Mom Boucher. Toronto: McClelland & Stewart. ISBN 978-0771030499.
- Friesen, Joe (2016). The Ballad of Danny Wolfe Life of a Modern Outlaw. Toronto: McClelland & Stewart. ISBN 9780771030314.
- Langton, Jerry (2015). Cold War How Organized Crime Works in Canada and Why It's About to Get More Violent. Toronto: HarperColllins. ISBN 978-1-4434-3255-9.
