= Barzan Tilli-Choli =

Iraqi gangster (born 1982)

Barzan Tilli-Choli (born 1982) is an Iraqi criminal gang participant who served as the leader of the United Nations gang in 2008–2009. He is originally from Zakho, Kurdistan, Iraq.

== Early career ==
Tilli-Choli was born into a Kurdish family in Iraqi Kurdistan and arrived in Canada as a refugee at the age of 17 in 1999. He was never granted Canadian citizenship and only held permanent resident status, placing him in a legal category that made it easier for the government to deport him back to Iraq. After his arrival in Canada, Tilli-Choli joined the United Nations gang led by Clayton Roueche.

In 2017, a former UN gang member who turned Crown's evidence known as D. due to a court order testified at the murder trial of UN gang member Cory Vallee. Vallee was charged with the murder of Red Scorpion Keven LeClair in 2009. In his testimony, D. stated: "At the time of Clay’s arrest there was a specific group — an assassin or shooter group — put together...There are the blunt instruments you can count on going to a bar and beating someone up or going to their house and threatening them. However if it was going to be a more precision kind of strike where they were going to kill someone or do a shooting of some kind, there would be the surgeon’s tool or sharper instruments if you will." Among the "blunt instruments" were the "Iraqi group" that consisted of Tilli-Choli, Duane Meyer, Ion Croitoru, and Trevor "Fingers" Gilbert. D. testified that the "surgical tool people" were used for "violent acts that required considerably more planning. Generally it was members of the FOB Killers or the FK group in Calgary".

== The murder of Jonathan Barber ==
Tilli-Choli had a well-known feud with the Bacon brothers of the Red Scorpions gang. Jonathan Barber was a young man working as installer of audio systems in automobiles whose cropped hairstyle made him bear a vague resemblance to Jonathan Bacon, one of the three Bacon brothers, who also had a cropped hairstyle. Barber was hired by Bacon to install a new audio system in his Porsche Cayenne SUV. On May 9, 2008, Barber was driving Bacon's Porsche from the Bacon home in Abbotsford to the firm's shop in Vancouver along the Kingsway highway when it was shot up by a group of U.N members consisting of Tilli-Choli, Dan Russell, Dilun Heng, Yong Lee, Karwan Saed and professional wrestler Ion Croitoru, out of the mistaken belief that he was Bacon. Barber's girlfriend, Vicky King, who was driving his car behind the SUV, was also injured, but she survived while Barber was killed.

A member of the UN gang who later turned Crown's evidence known only as C. due to a court order testified in 2017 that Tilli-Choli used his AK-47 assault rifle to shoot up the cars driven by King and Barber. C. testified on 8 May 2017: "Barzan starts lowering the rear window, the rear driver's side window...He starts aiming his weapon at the vehicles and he's starts firing at the Cherokee...Barzan was able to see into the window and said 'holy shit it's a girl!'. He stopped firing". Leaving King wounded in her car, Tilli-Choli then started shooting at the Porsche driven by Barber, pumping between 6-10 shots into his vehicle and killing him.

== Gang boss ==
Described by the journalist Jerry Langton as the most "notorious" member of the UN gang, Tilli-Choli became the leader of the United Nations gang after its first leader and founder Clayton Roueche was arrested in Texas on 19 May 2008. Tilli-Choli was known for the "human safaris" as he would spend hours cruising the Lower Mainland in his automobile looking for the Bacon brothers and other members of the Red Scorpions gang. In January 2009, Tilli-Choli was with Billy Ly of the Fresh Off the Boat Killers gang of Calgary, waiting outside of the GM Place where a Lil Wayne concert was being held, hoping to kill the Bacon brothers who were attending the concert. Ly was overheard on videotape telling Tilli-Choli to "unload the whole thing" (i.e. fire the entire round of his AK-47) if he saw the Bacon brothers. The police arrested both Tilli-Choli and Ly before the attempt could be made.

Nicola Cotrell, a British stripper living in Surrey who was Tilli-Choli's girlfriend, was involved in one of his murder attempts. During her trial in 2013, it emerged that Tilli-Choli was physically abusive towards her, frequently beating her. A policeman once found Tilli-Choli kicking Cotrell who was on the ground in a fetal position. Tilli-Choli was convicted of assault and ordered by the Crown not to contact Cotrell. Despite the order, Cotrell soon moved back in with Tilli-Choli.

On 13 February 2009, Cotrell texted Tilli-Choli: "I’m in love with you, I’ll do what you asked earlier. I want to spend tonight with you so I can wake up with my love on Valentines". On the night of 15 February 2009, she texted him after seeing Tyler Willock of the Red Scorpions at the T-Barz strip club. At about 11: 30 pm on February 15, she texted him "that guy" (Willock) was at the T-Barz strip club. Tilli-Choli texted back: "OK, who is he with?" Cotrell replied: "Losers. Five guys and some girls". Tilli-Choli in turn texted: "Ok, I'll be there in 10 minutes". Willock together with his friend Fraser Sunderland and a woman who remains unidentified had just gotten into a Power Rover automobile in the T-Barz parking lot when a group in a SUV led by Tilli-Choli pulled up beside them and opened fire, causing Sunderland to speed away. The SUV followed the Power Rover and Tilli-Choli continued to shoot at them, causing Sunderland to take a bullet in his left shoulder. Sunderland was badly wounded while Willock survived unhurt.

In March 2009, the police arrested and charged in connection with the Willock-Sunderland shooting Tilli-Choli, Aram Ali, Nicola Cotrell and Sarah Trebble who was the girlfriend of the Hells Angel Larry Amero. Tilli-Choli, Cotrell and Ali were charged with attempted murder while Trebble was charged with being an accessory to the crime as the police claimed she was in the SUV while the other three opened fire. All were released on bail even through there was already an outstanding deportation order on Tilli-Choli to send him back to Iraq. Shortly afterwards, Tilli-Choli was arrested alongside Daniel Russell, Karwan Saed, Soroush Ansari, Dilun Heng, Yong Sung, Aram Ali and Ion Croitoru on charges of plotting the murder of the Bacon brothers. Found inside of Tilli-Choli's iPhone were numerous photographs of the Bacon brothers. On 8 July 2013, Tilli-Choli made a plea bargain with the Crown where he pledged guilty to charges of conspiracy to murder the Bacon brothers in exchange for the Crown dropping the charges of first-degree murder he was facing in connection with the murder of Barber and the attempted murder of Sunderland.

On 27 January 2011 Trebbe, who worked as a realtor in the Lower Mainland, was acquitted of the firearms charges. On 13 December 2013, Cotrell was acquitted of the attempted murder charges relating to the Willock-Sunderland incident, but was convicted of assault. Cotrell apologized for her actions on the day of her sentencing, saying amid her tears: "I stand here in front of you, the honourable judge, and the court to acknowledge and accept consequences of my thoughtless actions in which I’ve caused harm, fear and pain to others. I only hope the people affected by this will be able to some day forgive me". Cotrell had moved to Edmonton, where she worked as a personal trainer and in a tattoo shop, and had ceased her gangland ties. The tattoo reading "Barzan" on the back of her neck had been replaced with a tattoo of a butterfly. In December 2015, Ali, described by the judge at his trial as "a mercenary for hire who was prepared to shoot a person for money and put other people at very serious risk", was convicted of aggravated assault.

== Deportation ==
On 19 January 2017, Tilli-Choli was deported back to his native Iraq after finishing his prison sentence for his conspiracy to commit murder conviction.

== Books ==
- Langton, Jerry (2010). Showdown: How the Outlaws, Hells Angels and Cops Fought for Control of the Streets. Toronto: John Wiley & Sons. ISBN 978-0470678787.
- Langton, Jerry (2013). The Notorious Bacon Brothers : inside gang warfare on Vancouver streets. Etobicoke, Ont.: J. Wiley and Sons Canada. ISBN 978-1118388679.
