= United Nations (gang) =

Criminal gang who started in the Vancouver, British Columbia

- Founding location: Abbotsford, BC/ Chilliwack, BC
- Years active: 1997–present
- Territory: Canada; United States
- Ethnicity: Various
- Leaders: Clayton Roueche, Barzan Tilli-Choli, Douglas Vanalstine, Conor D'Monte
- Criminal activities: Arms trafficking, drug trafficking, extortion, illegal immigration, money laundering, murder, passport fraud, prostitution, robbery, bribery, theft, assault, motor vehicle theft,
- Allies: Triads of Vancouver; Dhak group of British Columbia; Duhre group of British Columbia; Fob-killers of Alberta; Crazy Dragon Killaz of Alberta; Kang crime family (BIBO gang); Big Circle Gang of British Columbia; Mo dumplings gang of British Columbia; Sinaloa Cartel; Hells Angels MC
- Rivals: Wolfpack Alliance; Red Scorpions; Brothers Keepers

The United Nations (UN) is a criminal gang that originated in the area of Vancouver, British Columbia.

== History ==
=== Formation ===
The UN gang was formed in Abbotsford in 1997 by a group of high-school friends from around the Fraser Valley. The founder of the gang was Clayton Roueche, a white Canadian who grew up surrounded by Vietnamese-Canadians and Lao-Canadians. Roueche came to develop an Asian fetish as he was described as spending much of his time in Abbotsford's Vietnamtown where he loved: "the fortunetellers he'd find there, grainy bootlegged kung-fu movies and Vietnamese girls". A Korean-Canadian said of him: "Clay was never white. Maybe he was born white, but his soul was never White." After graduating from high school in 1993, Roueche worked in a variety of sales jobs and opened a restaurant which soon failed.

James Coulter, the best friend of Roueche recalled: "It started slowly. I started using E-ecstasy-just to stay awake and stay balanced because when you take ecstasy and you drink, it sort of counterbalances, you don't get high from ecstasy and you don't get drunk from drinking. But as soon as the ecstasy wears off, you are super, super drunk. Then I just started using crack, just for an extra high. Maybe it was take the stress away, I don't know." Coulter had moved to Abbotsford in 1996, was working in a warehouse and spent most of his free time in nightclubs and raves. Coulter stated: "I started hanging out with kids with nice cars. And you know, they would go to the gym in the day, and that really conflicted with my warehouse hours. And they had a couple of jobs here or there for me, and they would say, 'Hey do you want to learn how to grow marijuana?' Do a week of work, and you'll get a couple of grand". Coulter started to work as a petty drug dealer and in January 1997 he first met Roueche in a rave in Chilliwack. Roueche had connections with various Asian organized crime figures in Vancouver via the family of his Lao-Canadian girlfriend, and sold drugs at prices considerably lower than those allowed by the Hells Angels, which made him popular with Coulter and his associates. Coulter and Roueche started selling drugs together to pay for their drug habits.

Roueche began to work for a Vietnamese organized crime figure known as Vu. What began as a loose-knit group of Abbotsford thugs linked to Asian organized crime grew quickly over the years. They began a profitable drug-running enterprise involving helicopters flying across the US-Canada border trading much sought after British Columbian cannabis for cocaine to be sold in Canada. The United Nations gang was founded on 25 May 1997. Roueche discovered that the Kootenays region was where most of the marijuana in British Columbia was grown and starting in 1997 began to export marijuana to the United States. The B.C Bud strain of marijuana is very popular in the United States, becoming the United Nations gang's principal source of revenue. The journalist Jerry Langton wrote about the B.C. Bud strain: "It was so prized, so valued, that in some places, it was actually bartered kilo-for-kilo with cocaine, a feat unimaginable with any other strain of marijuana". In 2005, it was estimated that there were 22,000 marijuana grow-ops in British Columbia An article in Forbes magazine estimated in the same year that the total harvested marijuana crop in British Columbia was worth US$7 billion, making the then illegal marijuana industry into one of British Columbia's major industries. Besides the United States, the major markets for the B.C. Bud strain are Australia and Japan. The demand abroad for B.C. Bud and the other superior strains was such that the vast majority of the best marijuana in British Columbia was exported with the inferior strains being sold locally. With his new wealth, Roueche married his Lao-Canadian girlfriend and purchased an expensive house. The name United Nations was coined at a party hosted by Roueche in Richmond when somebody commented upon the racially diverse crowd by saying: "What the fuck is this, a United Nations meeting?" The name, United Nations (UN), alludes to the various ethnic origins of the members. The gang consists primarily of Canadians of European, East Asian, First Nations, and Persian background.

=== Growth ===
The dominant organized crime group in British Columbia as in much of the rest of Canada are the Hells Angels, who only accept whites, and as such the United Nations gang attracted non-white members, usually second-generation Vietnamese-Canadians and Lao-Canadians. In 2000, the United Nations gang were involved in a notably bloody brawl with the Hells Angels at the Animals nightclub in Abbotsford, which gave the gang stature in the underworld after beating up the Angels. A group of white Hells Angels supporters wearing "Support 81" T-shirts arrived and began to bully the Asian patrons of the club, several of whom were members of the UN gang. Coulter recalled: "I remember back in the day, everyone and their dog used to be afraid of anyone who had a Hells Angels support shirt, and you would tread lightly, you would tiptoe around these people, and we were just a bunch of kids and thought, you don't have to be afraid of these people. Right? You don't want to be bullied around. Numbers rule. We had a lot of numbers". As the Hells Angels supporters left following a call to the police, they warned the UN members that they were "dead" as they promised to return to the Animals nightclub the next weekend.

The next weekend, the Hells Angels supporters together with a number of actual Hells Angels arrived at the Animals nightclub. Coulter remembered: "I'll never forget. There was the big fight inside. It lasted maybe five minutes. Then everyone started running outside. I remember I came out the front doors and there were probably about five or six different fights happening out on the street and I seen an Abbotsford police officer pull up and he gets out of his car and he's on his walkie-talkie and he's like, 'There's H.A! There are fights everywhere!" It as like he had never seen anything like this before. Nor had I. That was one of the bigger fights I had ever been in". A group of 70 United Nations members fought and expelled 30 Hells Angels from the Animals nightclub, which was perceived as "theirs".

Roueche borrowed much from Asian culture for his gang. Roueche took aspects of bushido ("the way of the warrior"), the fierce code of the Japanese samurai, as the basis of the gang's philosophy, using the motto "Honor, loyalty, respect". All the members of the gang are expected to have the phrase "honor, loyalty, respect" tattooed on themselves in Chinese characters and their uniforms were hoodies covered with images of tigers and Asian dragons together with the phrase "honor, loyalty, respect" in Chinese characters. Coulter stated in an interview: "I liked honor, loyalty and respect. I thought those were good virtues. You honor your family, you respect others-you treat others the way you wanted to be treated". Roueche was obsessed with "eastern mysticism", and incorporated rituals based upon eastern mysticism into his gang's ideology. Members were expected to learn mixed martial arts, especially Thai kickboxing and Japanese jujitsu. Initiation ceremonies were based on those of the Chinese triads under which new members would walk under "The Mountain of Knives" as an archway of swords were named to swear eternal loyalty to the "36 Oaths" of the gang and drinking a bowl of rooster's blood. A senior member was a dai lo (Cantonese for "big brother") who would supervise the other members who were given much freedom to operate as they pleased. The gang initially avoided the rigidly hierarchical and authoritarian structure of traditional organized crime groups like the Mafia and outlaw biker clubs such as the Hells Angels.

The members of the UN gang like other gangsters in the Lower Mainland tended to come from middle-class families with loving parents, which was not the norm with the rest of Canada where the gangsters tended to come from working-class families and broken homes. Coulter was somewhat unusual in the UN gang in coming from an impoverished, broken home where both his parents were heroin addicts and bank robbers. Coulter served as the gang's enforcer or "mediator" as he called it. Coulter used steroids and working out at local gym to bulk up to 220 pounds to improve his ability to beat up other people. Coulter described the gang: "You go to a club with 20, 30, 40 guys, and as soon as you get there, you give hugs to everyone. It is like a family, right? And that is something I never had. I never had a family. So that was my family".

The UN gang pioneered an alternative sense of style and recognition that became prominent in Vancouver, BC up until the end of the early 2010s. Many UN members would "cloak" themselves by wearing high-end, expensive, and luxury brands based on California surf-trends, biker brands, and accessories that would not typically be assumed as what a gangster would wear. Many youth imitated this style before the end of around 2012. Common items included murses, high-end active wear, designer jeans, baseball caps, sandals and name brand belts. This has become a well-known sense of gangster appearance in BC due to the United Nations. Roueche stated that on the streets "recognition is power," and sought to promote the UN gang fashion style as a statement of the gang's power.

Starting in 2001, the UN gang started what the media called "dial-a-dope" lines. Low-level UN gang members would visit clubs and bars handing out cards with a name and a telephone numbers for prepaid cell phones, which were changed on an average of 3–4 weeks. Those who called the numbers would be answered by an associate who took the order for drugs and had the drugs delivered to the customer who paid cash when the deliverymen arrived. The "dial-a-dope lines" were very effective and had been widely copied by 2003. The deliverymen was usually the only ones exposed to be robbed by rival drug dealers or being arrested by the police. Langton noted that the "fanatic loyalty" Roueche promoted in his gang led for very few deliverymen to turn Crown's evidence and testify against his employers if they were arrested. Initially, the UN gang smuggled marijuana into the United States via trucks, but after the 9/11 terrorist attacks of 2001 led to American border security being increased, the UN gang switched over to helicopters to fly over the undefended 49th parallel. Unlike drugs such as cocaine and methamphetamine, where even small quantities can be sold for a premium price, marijuana needed to be smuggled in bulk to make it profitable. The UN gang formed ties with American organized crime groups and become one of the main sources of marijuana in Los Angeles and Chicago.

On the night of 22 December 2002, members of the UN gang led by James Thiphavong were involved in a bloody brawl with members of the Red Scorpions gang led by Anton Hooites-Meursing on the floor of Abbotsford's famous Luxor nightclub (formerly the Animals nightclub), with both sides using broken beer bottles as weapons. After being expelled from the Luxor, the fight continued out in the parking lot of the Luxor, leading to Hooites-Meursing to pull out a knife and stab BonLeuth Thiphavong and his brother Souskavath Thiphavong. BonLeuth Thiphavong later died of his wounds at the hospital. In January 2003, the UN gang killed the Red Scorpion Edward "Skeeter" Russell in revenge for Thiphavong's death. An audio tape of an UN gang member, Gupreet "Bobby" Rehal emerged with Rehal laughing about Russell's murder, which led the Red Scorpions to conclude that he was Russell's killer. Hooites-Meursing was ordered to kill Rehal. On 13 March 2003, Hooites-Meursing and several other Red Scorpions went to Rehal house at Saturnia Crescent in Abbotsford. One Red Scorpion knocked on the door of Rehal's parents' house and when the 19 year-old Rehal opened the door, he was shot in the face. Hooties-Meursing then picked up the gunman in his car. The gunman cannot be named as he was underage at the time of the killing. Rehal died of his massive head wound, which caused severe brain damage, the next day at the Royal Columbian Hospital.

In 2003, one of the most well-known members of the UN gang, Jing Bon Chan, was arrested for attempted murder. Chan had heard rumors that his long-time girlfriend, Christina Hyun Oh Yoon, was being unfaithful. On 2 August 2003, Chan received a call on his cellphone saying that Yoon had just admitted Winston Thieu Anh Bui to her posh third floor apartment at 6331 Buswell Street in Richmond. In fury, Chan drove to Yoon's apartment, and having a key to her apartment entered it to find Thieu and Yoon having sex. Chan pulled out a knife and stabbed Thieu several times. In panic, Thieu ran out to the balcony nude and bleeding, where he tried to walk over to the balcony of another apartment. Instead, he fell three stories down to the parking lot. Thieu's fall caused him to suffer a coma, which he is unlikely to ever come out of. Chan was charged with attempted murder and the possession of a concealed weapon. Chan is believed to be the deputy leader of the UN.

=== Smuggling ===
The B.C. Bud strain commands a premium price in the United States, where it is one of the most popular and most desired strains of marijuana. Smuggling marijuana into the United States via a variety of methods proved to very profitable for the UN gang. The main method of smuggling was flying in the marijuana at night via airplane and especially helicopters. Roueche and the UN gang were considered by American law enforcement to be the biggest smugglers of marijuana into the United States. The UN gang smuggled into the United States about 20 tons of marijuana per annum, usually by helicopter, making an annual profit of about $120 million U.S. dollars. Another method of marijuana smuggling was via airplanes. A Cessna airplane can carry about 300 pounds of marijuana, fly low to avoid American radar, land in the United States where the marijuana can be unloaded in a matter of minutes, and be back in Canada within minutes. However, helicopters were preferred for smuggling as planes require a landing field while a helicopter can land almost anywhere.

In March 2005, agents of the U.S. Immigration and Customs Enforcement (ICE) secretly attached a GPS transmitter and an ignition kill switch to a pickup truck being used to smuggle marijuana across the border. In June 2005, ICE agents waited for the truck to come the border and then activated the kill switch. Arrested were two Canadian UN gang members, Brian Fews and Trevor Schoutens. Roueche asked Ken Davis, the chief American agent for the UN gang, to pay the bail for Fews and Schoutens. On 12 August 2005, another UN gang member, Alexander Swanson, was arrested in Blaine, Washington State with several bags full of marijuana.

In September 2005, two UN gang members were arrested in Puyallup, Washington state with 1,000 pounds of marijuana in 23 bags. The two men charged were two brothers from Calgary, Zachary and Braydon Miraback. Zachary Miraback refused to give his name to the ICE agents and had no personal identification, which to him being charged with crossing the border with no proper identification. On 1 December 2005, a floatplane landed in Soap Lake in Washington state. The ICE found inside the plane 325 pounds of marijuana and arrested an UN gang member, Greg Fielding. On 14 March 2006, another floatplane landed in Omak lake in Washington state. The Colville Indian Reservation tribal police found inside the plane 314 pounds of marijuana and 2400 ecstasy pills. The tribal police arrested an UN gang member, Keven Haughton. The sheriff of Okanogan County, Frank Rogers, complained to the American media that too many Canadians were being arrested in his county for smuggling, saying: "We're running ourselves ragged. It's like an epidemic up here. We're running from call to call". On 23 March 2006, two Canadian women, Sharmila Kumar and Shialen Varma, both of Vancouver, were arrested near Omak lake with several hockey bags of marijuana in their SUV. Both women were believed to be working for the UN gang. Rogers told the media after the latest arrests: "It's almost like this is nothing to us. It's happening so much, it's ridiculous. They come anyway they can. It's well orchestrated and they plan this well in advance. It's a daily event". In 2006, an American woman, Jane Gerth, while driving on Highway 17, which is almost on the Canadian-American border, discovered along the highway a bag full of $507,270 U.S. dollars, which was meant to picked up as a payment for a drug shipment. The vast majority of those who smuggled marijuana into the United States were not arrested.

In early 2006, Davis-who turned informer for the U.S. government-visited Roueche, who told him to take some cash totaling $500,000 US dollars to California to buy 25 kilograms of cocaine to be smuggled into Canada. Roueche also told Davis to make contact with street level drug dealers in San Jose, California who were interested in selling B.C. Bud. Finally, Roueche mentioned that he wanted Davis to recruit American truck drivers to smuggle B.C. Bud and ecstasy pills into Texas, saying he had a client in the Lone Star State who wanted to buy from the UN gang. Davis started to drive from Seattle down to Los Angeles, making two trips. In the first trip, Davis took $109,555 U.S. dollars in cash to Los Angeles and the second trip $118,980. Roueche expressed much anger about how long Davis was taking to make the drive down to Los Angeles and warned him that he would send someone down from Vancouver to beat him up if he was not swifter on his third trip.

One of the helicopter pilots working for the UN gang was Dustin "Princess" Haugen. A joint Canadian-American police investigation known as Project Frozen Timbers was launched against the UN gang. On the night of 9 May 2006 as part of Project Frozen Timbers, Haugen was observed flying in a helicopter with another UN gang member, Daryl Desjardins across the border. Upon landing in Washington state, Haugen and Desjardins handed over five hockey bags to three men waiting for them in a pick-up truck. The truck was stopped by agents from the ICE. Found by the ICE agents inside the hockey bags were 300 pounds of B.C. Bud marijuana.

On 25 September 2006, ICE agents watched an airplane land at Tieton State Airport outside of Rimrock, Washington State and arrested the men present. Two UN gang members, Nicholas Kocoski and Joshua Hildebrandt, were arrested. Found with Kocoski was a handheld GPS device that shown that the flight had begun in Chilliwack, British Columbia; that Rimrock was just a stopping point along the way; and the ultimate destination was a remote airfield in Montana. The history of Kocoski's GPS device showed that he had taken this route hundreds of times before his arrest. The UN gang also smuggled drugs into Canada. On 27 September 2006, an UN gang member, Daniel Leclerc, was arrested at the Yreka Rohrer Field airport in Montague, California on his way back to Chilliwack. Found with Leclerc were 315 pounds of cocaine.

=== Alliance with the Sinaloa Cartel ===
A Lebanese-Canadian UN gangster, Ahmed "Lou" Kaawach-whom Roueche described as "wannable ladies man" and as an atrociously bad "gangsta" rapper whose attempts at rapping were unintentionally comical-enjoyed flaunting his vast wealth. For an instance, Kaawach owned a red Cadillac EXT pick-up truck fitted with six televisions in the back and doors that opened vertically. Kaawach owned an automobile customization business, but his real job was serving as the UN gang's liaison with Mexican cartels. Kaawach was deported back to his native Lebanon following his conviction on weapons charges. As Kaawach could not return to Canada, Roueche sent him to live in Guadalajara, where he served as his liaison with the Sinaloa Cartel, working out deals to exchange the prized B.C. Bud for cocaine. As the Sinaloa Cartel is one of the most powerful criminal organizations in Mexico, controlling much of the state of Sinola, the alliance with the Sinaloa cartel proved to be highly profitable for the UN gang.

Kaawach's principle contact in Canada was another UN gang member, the Guatemalan-Canadian Elliot "Taco" Castañeda, who worked as a realtor in Vancouver. Castañeda owned three houses in the Lower Mainland, each of which were valued at $1.1 million plus a BMW automobile, an expenditure that vastly exceeded his sales commissions as a realtor. On 12 July 2008, as Castañeda and Kaawach were eating tacos at the open-air Tacos de Barbacoa El Cuellos restaurant on Calle Pedro Buzeta in Guadalajara, a mini-van pulled up outside the restaurant followed up by a group of men jumping out and opening fire with automatic rifles on the duo. Both Castañeda and Kaawach were killed in the hail of bullets. The murders remain unsolved.

Under the impact of gang wars, greater discipline was needed and Roueche admitted in an interview that he ordered the beatings and the torture of gang members who disobeyed his orders, through he also claimed not to enjoy it. As a new criminal organization, the group fought a number of turf wars against other gangs, most notably the Red Scorpions. They also led a turf war against the Independent Soldiers gang, as it sought to establish itself.

=== Alliance with the Fresh Off the Boat Killers ===
Roueche forged a close alliance with the Fresh Off the Boat Killers, a Calgary gang made up of Chinese-Canadians, Korean-Canadians and Vietnamese-Canadians. The Fresh Off the Boat Killers are the rivals of another gang called Fresh Off the Boat. Starting in 2006, Roueche often met Troy Tran, Billy Ly and Mark Kim of the FOB Killers. Detective Andrew Wooding of the Abbotsford police stated: “It became clear from our surveillance that these guys were actually working with Roueche and taking direction from Roueche. At the time, we believed the FK were adopted by the UN and they were benefiting by getting better access to cocaine through the UN supply lines and the UN were bringing that sort of oversight and organization and the threat of a larger group that are looking after you." Roueche called Tran and Ly the "C-town guys" in a phone call that the police recorded, going on to say: "The C-town guys, they're fucking anywhere, anytime. Boom, boom, boom"."

=== Alliance with the Hells Angels ===
After establishing themselves against the Hells Angels, the two gangs reached a modus vivendi in 2005. In 2004, the police informer Michael Plante recorded the Hells Angel Johnny Punko saying that another Hells Angel, Gino Zumpano, "took a walk" with Roueche. Plante reported that his understanding was that Punko was saying a meeting had taken place. One of its biggest rivals was the Hells Angels but recently the two groups have been working together as some of the UN's high-ranking members became Hells Angels and also shown by the arrest of Omid Bayani, a mid-level member of the Hells Angels, who was arrested as part of an investigation looking at criminal actions of the Hells Angels. After Roueche's arrest in the United States in 2008, leadership was assumed by Barzan Tilli-Choli.

Typical of the gang's members was Omid Bayani, who was born in Iran as a member of the Baha'i faith. The Baha'i face savage persecution by the government of the Islamic Republic of Iran, which views them as apostates from Islam. Bayani's father was killed in Iran, causing the family to flee via Turkey to Canada, where Bayani arrived in at the age of 16. At the age of five, Baynai witnessed his father being lynched by a mob, who carved the word "Baha'i" into his chest before killing him. After arriving in Canada, Bayani grew up in Red Deer, Alberta. Through the Baha'i are pacifists who are opposed to violence even in self-defense, Bayani turned to robbing convenience stores for cigarettes and cash as a teenager. An unhappy ex-girlfriend reported him to the police, leading to Bayani being arrested, convicted, and sentenced to five years in prison. His lawyer argued that his crimes were due to his troubled youth, but the judge felt the violence of his robberies warranted five years in prison. Bayani was known to be a violent prisoner at the medium security Bowden Institution who attacked other prisoners with a club that had the words "goof beater" written on it. Bayani was transferred to the maximum security Kent Institution in Abbotsford, where a report declared about him: "While incarcerated he has on a number of occasions tried to provoke staff members into fights with him. It was noted that Bayani's actions during one of his offences caused a female victim to suffer serious psychological trauma. It appears that Bayani does not have a full understanding of this".

Through Bayani was ordered deported to Iran upon his release, he instead stayed in the Lower Mainland and joined the United Nations gang. Bayani was part of a Canada-wide drug smuggling network, selling 600 pounds of GHB, the so-called "date rape" drug, to a fellow Iranian, Mehrdad "Juicy" Bahman, of the Hell Angels downtown Toronto chapter, for him to sell in the greater Toronto area. The informer Steven Gault, who served as the treasurer of the Angels' Oshawa chapter told the police about the business relationship between Bahman and Bayani, leading to the police to seize the GHB that Bahman had stored in his garage. The seizure put Bahman into a $100,000 debt to the UN gang and the Haney chapter of the Hell Angels, forcing other members of the Toronto chapter to step in to help him pay off the debt that he could not manage on his own. The information provided by Gault led to the arrest of Bayani in 2007. Upon his arrest in Abbotsford on 4 April 2007, Bayani was found to be with a "full patch" Hells Angel, Vincenzo Sansalone, of the Haney chapter in his car. The police found in Bayani's car a loaded .38 handgun, a hunting knife, part of the leg of a wooden chair to use as a club, a machete, and 600 liters of GHB. Inspector Gary Shinkaruk of the RCMP stated: "Mr. Bayani, although he is an UN gang member, was known to work and associate criminally with other gangs. The fact that he is charged jointly with a member of the Hells Angels is not a surprise to us and it is really indicative of the networking and the relationships that now exist in the Lower Mainland and throughout Canada where these criminal organizations are working cooperatively with each other". Bayani together with Sansalone were convicted of trafficking in GHB in July 2011.

At the trial of Bahman in Toronto, Bayani attended the trial, watching from the public benches. One of the accused alongside Bahman, Lorne Edgar Campbell, described Bayani as "solid" (biker slang for someone dependable and trustworthy), saying "I liked his style". Bayani disappeared in September 2011 and has not been seen since. On 20 December 2011, Bayani was sentenced in absentia to seven years in prison. Bayani is believed to have fled Canada for Mexico.

The journalist Jerry Langton wrote that the United Nations gang "which had actually been incorporated in opposition to the Hells Angels-were now working for them". The United Nations gang soon into conflict with the Independent Soldiers gang. The conflict with the Independent Soldiers led to the alliance with the Hells Angels. The professional wrestler Ion Croitoru tried to join the Hells Angels' Vancouver chapter, and was instead directed to join the United Nations gang instead. On 24 February 2007, a double shooting occurred in Vancouver with two UN gang members being wounded. Both Roueche and Jing Bon Chan arrived at the shooting scene and the police believed that Roueche and Chan were "...were there to 'interview the victims' in order to determine the gang's response to the shooting".

On May 8, 2008, former Hells Angels head hunter and UN gang member Duane Harvey Meyer, 41, and nicknamed D.W., was killed, with the funeral held on May 15, 2008. Full members of the Hells Angels and UN gang members were at the funeral, with news stations and police agencies on hand to videotape all visitors. Whenever a United Nations member dies, he gets a special tombstone featuring the letters "UN" across it.

=== Arrests ===
Before a number of its leaders were arrested, the police estimated the gang had 50-100 core members in the Lower Mainland area of BC. The alleged leader of the United Nations Gang is Clayton Roueche. Roueche grew up in Chilliwack, BC. He later moved out to Abbotsford, BC and then on to Vancouver. Roueche had an obsession with martial arts and became involved in the drug scene at an early age.

As part of an American investigation into drug trafficking on a stopover in Texas on a flight from Mexico City on May 17, 2008, Roueche was arrested for conspiring to possess cocaine, conspiring to export cocaine, conspiring to import marijuana, and conspiring to launder money and was subsequently deported to the United States. Roueche faced up to a maximum of 220 years in prison, but he was sentenced to 30 years and $8 million in fines. He was flown to Seattle to answer to the charges. Other members arrested as part of the international investigation were UN members Kris Neri, Daryl Johnson, and Douglas Vanalstine.

Jong Ca John Lee is believed to have supplied the gang with guns. On June 9, 2007, the Vancouver Police Department (VPD) was called to his residence due to an unanswered 911 call. Lee answered the door, and the police saw what looked like firearms inside the apartment. A subsequent search revealed a dozen guns (some loaded, and some with defaced serial numbers), including automatic and semi-automatic rifles, and almost two dozen magazines of ammunition. Lee, who had no criminal record, pleaded guilty in September 2007 to all 10 charges. Lee also pleaded guilty to possession of 3.5 kilograms of cocaine for the purposes of trafficking, 900 grams of marijuana, a Panther stun gun, a silencer, and three stolen Canadian passports obtained through a home invasion. He was sentenced to five years each on two of the weapons charges and two years on each of the other charges, to be served concurrently.

The former de facto leader of the United Nations gang was Barzan Tilli-Choli, an Iraqi immigrant responsible for a myriad of crimes, none more infamous than his conspiracy to murder the notorious Bacon brothers (the Bacon brothers are believed to be high-ranking members of the rival Red Scorpions Gang). Tilli-Choli's elaborate plot to murder the Bacon brothers manifested in his arrest in April 2009, along with Dilun Hung, Aram Ali, Ion Croitoru, Daniel Russell, and realtor Soroush Ansari.

2004 saw the arrest at a Calgary hotel of drug and chemical importer Paul Vincent. Known for his unmatched ability to circumnavigate border security, Vincent was in possession of a vehicle-mounted Bren machine gun, a number of barrels of banned chemicals and $585,000 in cash. In a lengthy trial, the prosecution sought a 21-year sentence. The trial was brought to close with a dismissal due to an evidence-seizure technicality.

== Involvement in 2009 Vancouver gang violence ==
In 2008–2009, a violent gang war was brewing in the Lower Mainland area of B.C., with the UN gang believed to be playing a major role in it as the UN gang fought the Red Scorpions led by the Bacon Brothers. The Hells Angels through their proxy of the Independent Soldiers sought to play off both sides, selling both the UN gang and the Red Scorpions guns and ammunition. Despite the name of 2009 gang war, the conflict actually started a year earlier in January 2008 when the Red Scorpions made a murder attempt against Roueche. In response, Roueche placed bounties on the lives of the Bacon brothers with the bounty for killing Jamie Bacon being $300,000. Sometime in either late 2007 or early 2008, Roueche imported several Fresh Off the Boat Killers from Calary, most notably Billy Ly and Troy Tran, to assist with killing the Bacon brothers. On 8 May 2008, Duane Harvey Meyer, an important UN leader was killed in a drive-by shooting on the front lawn of his house on Kipling street in Abbotsford. A Ford F-350 truck and a Mercedes-Benze M-Class SUV drove by his house at about 10:30 pm to shoot Meyer who was walking on his front lawn. Meyer was able to crawl to his front porch and then died of blood loss. At Meyer's funeral, a gang of UN gangsters led by Roueche and Jing Bon Chan attended the ceremony while all dressed in their garish hoodies that were half white and black.

Jonathan Barber was a young man whose hairstyle made him bear a vague resemblance to Jonathan Bacon, one of the three Bacon brothers warring against the United Nations gang. Barber worked as an installer of audio systems in automobiles, and had hired by Bacon to install a new audio system in his car. On May 9, 2008, Barber was driving Bacon's Porsche Cayenne SUV from the Bacon household in Abbotsford to his shop in Vancouver along the Kingsway highway when his vehicle was shot up by gunmen in another car. The police have stated that there was a group of UN members consisting of the professional wrestler Ion Croitoru, Barzan Tilli-Choli and several others who were also driving along the Kingsway who gunned down Barber out of the mistaken belief that he was Bacon. Barber's girlfriend, Vicky King, who was driving his car behind the SUV, was also injured, but she survived while Barber was killed. Tran later testified that he was one of the gunmen in Tilli-Choli's car and he thought Barber was Bacon because "all white guys" looked the same to him.

On 3 February 2009, Raphael Baldini of the Red Scorpions was shot dead while talking on his cell phone in a friend's SUV. Badini's last words as a group of men in another SUV opened fire on him was "oh my God!" On 6 February 2009, the mixed martial arts fighter and Red Scorpion Kevin LeClair was shot and killed in the parking lot of the Marketplace IGA grocery store at the Thunderbird Centre mall. The police believe that both murders were the work of the UN gang. On 12 February 2009, Nicole Marie Alemy was shot and killed inside her white Cadillac CTS coupe automobile. Alemy was the wife of the UN gang member, Koshan Alemy, and it is believed she was targeted intentionally as a way to bring grief to her husband. The windows of Nicole Alemy's Cadillac were clear and she was only with her four-year-old son when she was shot down. On the evening of 15 February 2009, Tyler Willock of the Red Scorpions were riding with his friend Fraser Sunderland and a woman who remains unidentified in a Power Rover automobile when a group in a SUV opened fire and gave chase. Sunderland was badly wounded and bled to death while Willock survived.

On 4 March 2009, Sunil Mall of Abbotsford was found murdered in his automobile. Mall had been an UN gang member, but went over to the Red Scorpions after Roueche was arrested in the United States. On 31 March 2009, Ryan "Whitey" Richards and Sean "Smurf" Murphy of the Red Scorpions were murdered. Murphy was found murdered inside his automobile while Richards's body was found behind the Yellow Barn Country Produce market later the same day.

In March 2009, the police arrested and charged in connection with the Willock-Sunderland shooting the UN gang boss Barzan Tilli-Choli, Aram Ali, Nicola Cotrelll and Sarah Trebble who was the girlfriend of the Hells Angel Larry Amero. Tilli-Choli, Cotrell and Ali were charged with first-degree murder while Trebble was charged with being an accessory to the crime as the police claimed she was in the SUV while the other three opened fire. All were released on bail even through there was already an outstanding deportation order on Tilli-Choli to send him back to Iraq. Tilli-Choli was replaced as gang boss by Douglas Vanalstine. On 26 November 2009, Vanalstine was charged alongside Daryl Johnson and Nicholas Wester for various drug charges. In 2013, Tilli-Choli pleaded guilty to conspiracy to commit murder in a plea bargain with the Crown and on 18 January 2017 was deported to the Kurdistan region of Iraq. The gang was badly hurt in the early 2010s by the arrests and convictions of its leading members such as Barzan Tilli-Choli, Daryl Johnson, Jong Ca, John Lee and Douglas Vanalstine.

In 2017, a former UN gang member who turned Crown's evidence known as D. due to a court order testified at the murder trial of UN gang member Cory Vallee. Vallee was charged with LeClair's murder in 2009. In his testimony, D. stated: "At the time of Clay's arrest there was a specific group — an assassin or shooter group — put together...There are the blunt instruments you can count on going to a bar and beating someone up or going to their house and threatening them. However if it was going to be a more precision kind of strike where they were going to kill someone or do a shooting of some kind, there would be the surgeon's tool or sharper instruments if you will." Among the "blunt instruments" were the "Iraqi group" that consisted of Barzan Tilli-Choli, Duane Meyer, Ion Croitoru, and Trevor "Fingers" Gilbert. D. testified that the "surgical tool people" were used for "violent acts that required considerably more planning. Generally it was members of the FOB Killers or the FK group in Calgary". D. stated that: "Roueche was the glue that kept the group together. He was very active in organizing dinners and bringing people out. If we were going to a nightclub or having a New Year's Eve party, he would make sure everyone would come and spend time together and do business together." In June 2018, Valle was convicted of murdering LeClair.

== Conflict with the Wolfpack Alliance ==
The United Nations gang came to be involved in a violent feud with the Wolfpack Alliance led by Larry Amero and Rabih "Robby" Alkhalil of the Alkhalil family, who both lived in Montreal. In 2011, five members of the UN gang were murdered while in Mexico, which is believed to have been an attempt to cut the UN gang off from their Mexican suppliers. On 15 January 2012, Salih "Sal" Abdulaziz Sahbaz, an UN member from Surrey, was murdered in Sinaloa, Mexico with some $20,000 U.S. dollars found in his wallet. On 16 January 2012, Thomas Gisby of the United Nations narrowly escaped an assassination attempt via bomb at his house in Whistler. Gisby fled to Mexico to escape the Wolfpack Alliance. On 28 April 2012, Gisby was shot dead shortly after 9am while waiting in a line at a Starbucks in Nuevo Vallarta. Gisby was shot twice from behind with a .44 Magnum handgun, which is a type of gun rarely used to commit murders in Mexico where the weapons of choice are 9mm handguns, .38 handguns or AK-47 assault rifles. A member of the Wolfpack calling himself Sossa texted Alkhalil at 10:16 am that day claiming to have killed Gisby, which led Alkhalil to text back "lol". Alkhalil was proud of the murder, though he noted that someone from the UN gang was currently looking to kill him in Montreal at present, causing him to keep a low profile. On 25 June 2012, Randy Naicker, the leader of the Independent Soldiers and a Wolfpack member, was murdered by the UN gang in Port Moody.

At approximately 1:30 am on May 28, 2023, Amarpreet Samra (a.k.a. "Chucky") was shot dead in South Vancouver as he exited a wedding reception at Fraserview Banquet Hall. He and his brother Ravinder Samra were both in attendance and both aligned with the United Nations gang. In August 2022, both brothers had been listed by the Combined Forces Special Enforcement Unit British Columbia as one of 11 criminals who could post a threat to public safety due to links with extreme levels of gang violence. The Samra brothers had been linked with a number of killings and shootings in British Columbia by law enforcement. Investigators believe the shooting was targeted and related to ongoing gang conflict.

== Structure ==
=== Hierarchy ===
After expanding to other parts of Canada, the criminal organization became more structured. It adopted a hierarchy system using military ranks. Each province in the country is attributed a Commander who chooses different Generals for each city. This method of work enabled the high-ranked members of the organization to stay more discreet and safe from police arrests as their identities stay unknown. According to a 2016 presentation by Sgt. Doug Spencer of the RCMP & The Odd Squad Productions, the gang currently has no hierarchy. A large percentage of the original members are either in prison, dead, deported, or have disappeared. Some members still continue to exist, however only living off the name UN.

== Books and articles ==
- Edwards, Peter (2013). Unrepentant The Strange and (Sometimes) Terrible Life of Lorne Campbell, Satan's Choice and Hells Angels Biker. Toronto: Vintage Canada. ISBN 9780307362575.
- Edwards, Peter; Nájera, Luis (2021). The Wolfpack The Millennial Mobsters Who Brought Chaos and the Cartels to the Canadian Underworld. Toronto: Random House of Canada. ISBN 9780735275409.
- Langton, Jerry (2010). Showdown: How the Outlaws, Hells Angels and Cops Fought for Control of the Streets. Toronto: John Wiley & Sons. ISBN 978-0470678787.
- Langton, Jerry (2013). The Notorious Bacon Brothers Inside Gang Warfare on Vancouver Streets. Toronto: John Wiley and Sons. ISBN 9781118404577.
- Totten, Mark (2012). Nasty, Brutish, and Short The Lives of Gang Members in Canada. Toronto: James Lorimer Publishers. ISBN 9781459400399.
