= Bacon brothers =

Gangster trio

Bacon family
- Years active: 2000-present
- Territory: Vancouver
- Ethnicity: White Canadians
- Membership: 3 members
- Activities: drug trafficking, arms trafficking
- Allies: Red Scorpions
- Rivals: United Nations

The Bacon brothers, Jonathan, Jarrod, and Jamie Bacon, are a trio of gangsters from Abbotsford, British Columbia, who are suspected of multiple firearms and drug trafficking charges and implicated in a rash of homicides that took place in the Fraser Valley and Greater Vancouver area. Jonathan, the oldest brother, was murdered in Kelowna on August 14, 2011.

== Rise to power ==
The Bacon family originated from Edmonton. David Bacon was a special education teacher who moved to Abbotsford after being hired by the Abbotsford School District while his wife Susan worked as a property manager for the Prospera Credit Union. The Bacon family was comfortably middle-class. The three Bacon brothers were Jonathan David (born January 31, 1981), Jarrod Wayne (born March 14, 1983), and James Kyle "Jamie" (born August 1, 1985).

Jonathan Bacon attended W. J. Mouat Secondary School and excelled at wrestling. One woman who knew the Bacon brothers who has asked to be identified only as "Elizabeth" suspected that Jonathan was working as a drug dealer, saying "When you see a kid start to have money all of a sudden, you immediately figure it's drugs". "Stephanie" described Jonathan as a popular student who loved wrestling and who became colder as he became to associate with a group of older men, saying of his new friends: "They were older, some of them in their 20s, They all had cars and expensive stuff like jewelry and watches. When Jonathan started to hang out with them, he started acting like them, talking like them, dressing like them". Another woman who went to school with Jonathan who asked to be identified only as "Amy" stated that the Bacon family was considered to be mostly "normal", but the two younger Bacon brothers were viewed as "bad news". "Amy" described Jonathan as becoming more distant as he aged, saying: "It's not like he became mean and nasty, or like a bully, or anything. It's just that he became less friendly, more of a tough guy". "Amy" also stated that Jonathan's new friends, including the non-Asians, all had tattoos in "Chinese writing" (members of the United Nations gang are required to have the phrase "Honour, Loyalty, Respect" in Chinese characters tattooed on themselves). Jonathan graduated from Mouat in 1999 and did not go to college. In 2000, he was arrested and convicted of drug possession and again in 2001 for the possession of stolen goods. In 2001, David and Susan Bacon purchased an expensive house at 35475 Strathcona Court with seven bedrooms that sparked much discussion in the community about a how teacher and a property manager could afford their new home.

Jarrod and Jamie Bacon both attended Yale Secondary School. In 2002, Jarrod took up wrestling and in 2003 won the provincial high school wrestling championship. Jamie likewise followed his brothers in embracing wrestling and in his final year of high school won a provincial gold medal in wrestling. One woman who knew Jarrod who has asked to be identified only as "Andrea" stated: "He was a tough guy, pushing his weight around. While Jonathan could be quite charming at times, Jarrod was more like a thug. My little brother and all his friends would avoid him at all costs. They were scared of him." Andrea said of Jamie: "He was a jerk. I never liked him. At his age, lots of guys can be immature, but Jamie was like mean; like over the top, like he seemed to enjoy pissing other people off". Another woman known as "Christine" stated about Jarrod: "I couldn't believe it when I heard he was a teacher's son. He was disruptive in class and seemed not to care at all about his work". Christine said of Jamie: "He always had new fancy things, like clothes and jewelry, and he had a car when he was very young-a big car, an expensive one...I just assumed it was drugs"

On May 15, 2001, Jamie was arrested for assault at the age of 15, an incident that is little known owing to a court ban. Journalist Jerry Langton wrote that the Bacon brothers were typical of the gangsters in the Lower Mainland who usually came from middle-class families with loving parents. Langton wrote that Bacon brothers "...didn't come from poverty or an abusive or broken homes. In fact, they came from exactly the opposite upbringing that many social critics say incubates crime. The Bacon brothers lived in middle-class affluence in a nice house with their supportive parents. They went to good schools at which they excelled athletically and were popular socially. They were just some guys who thought they could get rich selling drugs".

A man who asked only to be identified as Nelson who moved from Toronto to Abbotsford lived on Strathcona Court and knew the Bacon family. Nelson described the Bacon brothers as being in their 20s, but still living with their parents. Nelson said that the Bacon brothers made everyone in the neighborhood "nervous" and that: "Nobody wanted to run into them because they were obnoxious and rude. It started with the old man. He was not just rude, but aggressively so. I have no idea how he had a job as a teacher". Nelson called Jonathan the most relatively reasonable of the three Bacon brothers while Jarrod "tried to look like a gangster in dark suits and expensive sunglasses. He looked like he had more money than taste". Nelson called Jamie the worse of the three brothers, saying: "He was the size of a moose and seemed about half as smart. While the other two had macho swagger, Jamie looked like a psycho". Nelson stated that the Bacon brothers dominated the neighborhood, parking their expensive luxury cars whatever they pleased and holding loud parties well into the night. When Langton asked Nelson about the origins of their Bacon brothers' wealth, he stated: "They sold drugs, of course". The Royal Canadian Mounted Police (RCMP) believed the Bacon brothers were working with the United Nations gang. The Bacon brothers worked with rather than for the United Nations gang as the brothers held in contempt Clayton Roueche and what Langton called his "juvenile, faux-Asian, semi-religious rituals". In 2004, Jarrod was charged with attempted murder after a man was shot at the Fraser Valley Inn. The charges were dropped when the victim of the shooting refused to testify against Bacon in court.

== Arrest of Jonathan Bacon ==
In 2005, Jonathan moved out of his parents' house and rented a house at Winfield Drive with his girlfriend, Rayleene Burton. The neighbors of Bacon described "expensive-looking" automobiles constantly being parked in his driveway and on the street as various "tough-looking guys" were always coming and going into the house. The police arrested and charged Jonathan with leading a break-in into a marijuana grow-op, but the unwillingness of the witnesses to testify against him led to Jonathan only being convicted of possession of stolen goods. Jonathan also starting taking helicopter lessons from Dustin "Princess" Haugen, a helicopter pilot known to work as a drug smuggler for the United Nations gangs, flying drugs over the American border. In March 2005, Haugen was involved in a helicopter crash that killed his girlfriend, Christina Alexander. Haugen claimed that he was taking Alexander on a "sightseeing trip" at night. Bacon ceased his helicopter lessons after the crash.

The Abbotsford police put Jonathan Bacon under surveillance, and on the afternoon of August 4, 2005, Constable John Forster was informed by the surveillance team that Bacon was sitting in the car of Godwin Cheng, a known drug dealer, in front of his house. Forster ordered the policemen present to arrest both Bacon and Cheng, and after arresting the two men, the police found 8 ounces of marijuana, 15 ecstasy pills, 92 hits of methamphetamine, and $2,600 in cash in Cheng's car. Upon seeing Bacon's arrest, Burton fled from the house in her SUV and after she was arrested only blocks away from Bacon's house, the police found $88,000 in cash inside her SUV.

After being granted a search warrant, the Abbotsford police found in Bacon's house four handguns, two semi-automatic and two automatic, plus a police scanner and a genuine police constable's uniform. Bacon was dressing up as a policeman, apparently to assist with robbing other drug dealers. On October 25, 2005, Jamie Bacon and Denis Karbovanec of the Red Scorpions were arrested for uttering death threats and pointing weapons after becoming involved in a verbal altercation on Sandy Hill Road.

== Association with the Red Scorpions ==
On September 21, 2006, a drive-by shooting at Strathcona Court left Jonathan Bacon wounded on the driveway as he took multiple gunshot wounds. As Jonathan recovered from the shooting, many of his duties fell upon Jamie, whom Langton called "the monstrous, childish, monosyllabic body-builder and wrestler". On December 7, 2006, at the Castle Fun Park in Abbotsford, Jamie was attending a meeting when a passer-by happened to notice one of the men attending the meeting was carrying a gun and called the police. Arrested alongside Jamie were Randy Naicker and Barry Espadilla of the Independent Soldiers and Dennis Karbovanec and Anton Hooites-Meursing of the Red Scorpions.

In 2006, the brothers partnered with the Red Scorpions gang to help them compete with the United Nations gang. The authorities believed that the brothers took leadership control of the Red Scorpions shortly thereafter. It is believed that the Bacon brothers' take-over of the Red Scorpions was orchestrated by the Hells Angels to reduce the Red Scorpions down to a Hells Angels puppet gang. Clayton Roueche, the boss of the United Nations gang was dismissive of the Bacon brothers, saying: "To me they were just little errand boys."

On February 21, 2007, the Bacon brothers left Abbotsford to move to their new home, a luxurious rental house at 15830 106th Avenue in Surrey. Unlike Abbotsford which has its own police force, Surrey hired out its policing to the RCMP. The Mountie detachment for Surrey was much smaller than the Abbotsford police force, and most of its members are not from British Columbia. There was perception in the Lower Mainland underworld in the early 21st century that Surrey was an easier place to operate in as the RCMP detachment for Surrey is more "transient" as most of its members rotate around various posts in Canada and hence lack local roots.

On April 13, 2007, as Jamie Bacon was in the process of parking his car in the drive-way of his house, his Corvette automobile was shot up by two gunmen who put bullets into the vehicle. Jamie jumped out of the car, pulled out a Glock handgun and fired four shots at the would-be assassins who were now running away. Jamie was slightly wounded by the attack as he was wearing a bulletproof vest. As he was being driven to the hospital to treat the slight gash on his head, Jamie told constable Byron Donovan of the RCMP who was riding with him that the shooting was "part of the lifestyle". Jamie told constable Donovan that he always wore a bulletproof vest whenever he went out as part of his "lifestyle". Jamie also stated he was wearing a "level 3" bulletproof vest which he stated were the best quality bulletproof vests, which he had learned from watching a TV documentary.

== Lower Mainland gang war ==
The Lower Mainland was gripped by a gang war from 2007 to 2009 as the Red Scorpions fought the United Nations gang while the Hells Angels and their puppet gang, the Independent Soldiers, sought to play off both sides, supplying guns to both the rival gangs, which greatly increased the violence. Allied with the United Nations gang against the Red Scorpions was the Dhak-Duhre gang. The gang war increased the dependence of both the Red Scorpions and United Nations gang on the Hells Angels, cementing their control of the Lower Mainland underworld. The police response to the gang war was greatly hindered by the perception that the police forces in the Lower Mainland were grossly inept, which made people unwilling to come forward with information, which was the legacy of the Pickton case. Pickton was finally arrested in 2002, but the way that the police had ignored the evidence that Pickton was a serial killer gave police forces in the Lower Mainland a reputation for being extremely incompetent and callous, which made ordinary people unwilling to risk their lives to come forward with information during the gang war. Throughout the gang war, the police forces in the Lower Mainland consistently appealed to the public for more information about the gangsters as it was openly admitted that the police were operating in an information vacuum.

In 2007, Edward "Eddie" Narong, one of the founding members of the Red Scorpions, broke away to found his own gang along with Corey Jason Lal. Corey Lal refused a demand from Jamie Bacon to pay him a $100,000 "tax" for the right to sell drugs in Surrey. Justice Kathleen Ker stated in 2020 that Bacon wanted Lal killed because of his ego, saying: "he didn't want to look weak. In their world, Corey Lal had to die". Ker stated that Jamie was the leader of "diabolical plot" to have Lal killed. Jamie Bacon met with Corey Lai at a McDonald's restaurant to threaten his life, warning he would be killed if did not pay the "tax" he wanted.

On October 19, 2007, the Surrey Six massacre made the gang war in Vancouver front-page news. On that day, six people were shot dead inside Unit 1505 at the Balmoral Tower in Surrey. The dead included four gangsters, namely Edward "Eddie" Narong, aged 22; Michael Justin Lal, aged 26; his brother Corey Jason Lal, aged 22; and Ryan Bartolomeo, aged 19. The Lal brothers had been in a dispute about how much "taxes" they owed the Red Scorpions for the right to sell drugs in Surrey and had broken away to found their own gang. The newly founded Lal gang had been "exterminated" in its entirety with the Surrey Six massacre. Two innocent by-standers, Chris Mohan, who lived across from Unit 1505, and Edward Schellenberg, a gas installation man, were also killed as inconvenient witnesses to the massacre in Unit 1505. Jamie Bacon was not present at the massacre, but Justice Ker stated he was the "chief architect" of the massacre. Ker stated that Bacon was driven by his ego to order the massacre, saying: "In the twisted logic and perverse code of the criminal point of view, there is a zero tolerance policy for displays of disrespect and defiance. Such conduct must be quickly deterred. Death is often the punishment meted out for such behavior".

Staff Sergeant Derek Brassington of the Surrey RCMP was assigned to lead the investigation into the Surrey Six massacre. Brassington was a career Mountie married to a fellow Mountie, who was known as a "cop's cop". Brassington was assigned to the Surrey Six case as reportedly the best detective in British Columbia. Evidence released after the convictions of the police detectives in charge of the Surrey Six case in 2019 showed that instead of pursuing the killers behind the Surrey Six massacre, the Mountie detectives in charge of the case spent a disproportionate amount of their time in drunken debauchery. The elite police team spent much of their time being intoxicated at various bars and strip clubs while making sexual advances on female witnesses, which nearly ruined the case against Jamie Bacon. Two of the officers convicted claimed that their job stress made them incapable of rational thinking and the riotous bacchanalian excess that the squad engaged in was a result of their stress-induced mindlessness. Brassington's superior, Inspector David Attew of the RCMP, tried very hard to seduce the girlfriend of one of the witnesses for the Crown, which nearly caused the man to break off his agreement to testify against Jamie Bacon. The detectives in charge of the Surrey Six case all faced charges of fraud for billing the Crown for overtime pay while they instead drinking in various bars and strip clubs. Langton wrote about the Surrey Six massacre: "The killers had more chutzpah and ego than they had any technical knowledge of how best to go about assassination. They let behind a huge mess of DNA and other evidence. But real investigations are not at all like the magic they show on TV and in movies. To build a compelling case from even the sloppiest murder scene takes lots of hours of hard work and no small amount of luck".

The Fiji-born Eileen Mohan, the mother of Chris Mohan, became an eloquent spokeswoman for the cause of law and order, demanding that the police take action to bring the killers of her son to justice. By this point, the Bacon brothers had become major celebrities in the Lower Mainland as the brothers courted attention by wearing expensive clothing, driving expensive cars, and always having attractive girlfriends in town. In the same way that Maurice Boucher became a folk hero in Montreal during the Quebec biker war, the Bacon brothers became folk heroes in the Lower Mainland, being mobbed by adoring fans in their public outings. The Bacon brothers were widely idolized and admired throughout the Lower Mainland for their apparent ability to outwit both rival gangster and the Crown. Many young men in the Lower Mainland started to copy the short, cropped hairstyle favored by the Bacon brothers, who were seen as the zenith of "cool". The American journalist Jesse Hyde wrote the media in the Lower Mainland "loved" the Bacon brothers, always obsessively following their latest move. Starting in February 2008, Eileen Mohan spoke at various rallies in Vancouver demanding that the media stop glamourizing the Bacon brothers as noble folk heroes, and that the police start taking more pro-active approach.

In early 2008, Clayton Roueche recruited two members of Calgary's Fresh Off the Boat Killers gang, namely Billy Ly and Troy Tran, to come to the Lower Mainland to kill the Bacon brothers. On May 9, 2008, an young man named Jonathan Barber who happened to vaguely resemble Jonathan Bacon because his hairstyle was an imitation of the Bacon brother hairstyle was driving Jonathan Bacon's black Porsche Cayenne SUV down the Kingsway highway from Abbotsford to Vancouver. Barber worked as the installer of the stereo equipment into automobiles, and he had been hired by Bacon to install a new audio system into his Cayenne. A car carrying a group of UN members led by professional wrestler Ion Croitoru and Barzan Tilli-Choli also going down the Kingsway happened to see the Cayenne driven by Barber and noticing from the distance that the driver looked like Jonathan Bacon, opened fire on the Cayenne, killing Jonathan Barber instantly. Tilli-Choli became the leader of the United Nations gang after Clayton Roueche was arrested in Texas on May 19, 2008. Tilli-Choli, who became the most tenacious opponent of the Bacon brothers, was known for the "human safaris" as he would spend hours cruising the Lower Mainland in his automobile looking for the Bacon brothers and other members of the Red Scorpions gang. On May 31, 2008, the police issued a statement warning anyone who was associating with Jonathan Bacon was putting their lives at risk. On July 16, 2008, the charges against Jonathan Bacon, Godwin Cheng, and Rayleene Burton for the possession of illegal weapons and drugs was dismissed when the judge ruled that the police lacked a warrant to search Cheng's car in 2005 and the arrest of Burton was also illegal because she only fled because of the arrests of Bacon and Cheng.

On October 23, 2008, Dennis Karbovanec was stopped by the police who found he was wearing a bulletproof vest and had a loaded handgun with a silencer in a hidden compartment in his Yukon Denali automobile. The police also noted that Jonathan Bacon was driving right behind Karbovanec in his Mercedes-Benz when they pulled Karbovanec over. The police believed that Karbovanec was just a pawn negotiated with the Bacon brothers, and worked out a deal where the Crown would drop all, but one of the 11 weapons charges Karbovanec was facing in exchange for the brothers handing over Karbovanec's weapons cache. Jonathan Bacon handed over to Abbotsford police detective Lyle Simpson on behalf of Karbovanec 7 handguns, 2 shotguns, a hand grenade, an Uzi submachine gun, a rifle, and 114 sticks of dynamite. In return, the Crown dropped 10 of the 11 charges and released Karbovanec on $15,000 bail. When the deal the Crown made with the Bacon brothers became public knowledge, it led a firestorm of criticism in the media and on social media as the Crown was accused of being far too lenient with the Bacon brothers. Adding to the criticism were photographs that the Bacon brothers posted on social media showing themselves enjoying lavish vacations in Mexico.

One of the leaders of the UN gang, Conor D’Monte, discussed plans in late 2008 to have a helicopter drop a bomb on the Bacon brothers home. The plan that was abandoned according one of those involved who later turned Crown's evidence as "too difficult logistically. You never know how big the bomb could be. You could damage or kill the neighbours". Another means considered by D'Monte was buying a military rocket launcher to "use it to pierce one of the Bacons’ armoured vehicle", a plan that was also abandoned when it proved impossible to buy a contraband rocket launcher. In January 2009, Tilli-Choli was with Billy Ly of the Fresh Off the Boat Killers gang of Calgary, waiting outside of the GM Place where a Lil Wayne concert was being held, hoping to kill the Bacon brothers who were attending the concert. Ly was overheard on videotape telling Tilli-Choli to "unload the whole thing" (i.e. fire the entire round of his AK-47) if he saw the Bacon brothers. The police arrested both Tilli-Choli and Ly before the attempt could be made. On January 16, 2009, the Abbotsford police answered a call that three men was seen carrying guns at the Sevenoaks Shopping Center. The three men turned out to be the Bacon brothers; no guns were found on them, though Jonathan was wearing a bulletproof vest. On January 20, 2009, at about 3:50 pm, Jamie Bacon was driving in his Mercedes-Benz SL55 automobile on the South Fraser Way and had stopped at a red light when a SUV pulled alongside him and a group of men opened fire. Six bullets were pumped in Jamie's Mercedes-Benz, which led him to run the red light and he drove manically down the South Fraser Way at high speed, being chased by his would-be assassins. Bacon ended up crashing his automobile into a Keg restaurant after his car hit a median.

After learning that Jonathan Bacon had moved into a condo at 651 Nootka Way in Port Moody, on February 3, 2009, the Port Moody police warned in a public statement that to associate with any of the three Bacon brothers was to put one's life in danger. Langton wrote: "Not surprisingly, the Port Moody warning didn't work. If anything, it only made the gangsta-wannabe kids in the Lower Mainland admire the Bacon Brothers even more. The boys had proved they were not just untouchable by law enforcement, but also by their enemies....Their lives were like the twisted fantasies of a bored 12-year old. The warning only put an official stamp on it". Later on the same day of the Port Moody warning, an associate of the brothers, Raphael Baldini was gunned down in Surrey. People in the Lower Mainland flooded social media sites with praise and tributes for Baldini. On February 6, 2009, a Bacon brother associate, Kevin LeClair, was shot in the front of the Marketplace IGA grocery and died the next day. On February 16, 2009, Nicole Marie Alemy, the wife of a UN gang member, Koshan Alemy, was gunned down in her car. As she was driving only with her 4-year-old son and the windows of her Cadillac CTS coupe were clear, it is believed that this was not a case of mistaken identity, but rather that her killers had targeted her intentionally as a way to bring grief to her husband. The murder of Alemy finally changed public opinion in the Lower Mainland and people began to supply information about the underworld. For the first time, the police phonelines for tips was overwhelmed as thousands of people called in to supply potential information about the Alemy murder. Mountie Corporal Dale Carr told the media: "We're starting to see a bit of a groundswell, if you, of people just saying, 'enough is enough, we're fed up, we're going to give a call'". Two of the callers identified themselves as long-time members of the Red Scorpions who both stated that they were disgusted by the cold-blooded execution of a mother in front of her 4-year-old son, and the information they supplied proved to be very useful to the police. On February 22, 2009, an anti-gang rally was held in Surrey's Central City Plaza, where the lead speaker was Eileen Mohan who demanded once again that the police take action to arrest those responsible for the Surrey Six massacre.

== Arrests of Jamie and Jarrod Bacon ==
On January 19, 2009, the police Combined Forces Special Enforcement Unit was contacted by a man known as G.L. due to a court order who wanted to work as an informer, provided the Crown was willing to pay him for his services and information. The Crown was desperate for any information that might convict the Bacon brothers and agreed to G.L's offer. G.L had served a prison sentence in California for smuggling cocaine from Mexico, and upon his return to Canada contacted Wayne Scott, whose daughter Carly was the girlfriend of Jarrod Bacon and the mother of his child. G.L's connections with organized crime circles in the United States and Mexico together with him serving a prison sentence in California made his offer to import $3 million worth of cocaine seemed credible to Wayne Scott.

Through Wayne Scott, the informer G.L. first met Jarrod Bacon in February 2009, where he spoke about importing 100 kilograms of cocaine from Mexico, which he would then sell to Bacon. Jarrod Bacon stated he had a financial backer in the form of very wealthy Indo-Canadian berry farmer who was willing to lend him $3 million in cash to pay for the cocaine. Wayne Scott and G.L. seemed to have a low opinion of Jarrod's backer, whom they always called a "fucking Hindu". G.L. went to work for a diamond mine in northern British Columbia for the next two months, but stayed in contact with Bacon via his cell phone.

On April 1, 2009, Dennis Karbovanec of the Red Scorpions confessed to the police his role in the Surrey Six massacre. On April 3, 2009, Karbovanec was arrested on charges of first-degree murder for his role in the Surrey Six massacre on the basis of his confession. Karbovanec confessed to killing Ryan Bartolomeo, Michael Lai and Christopher Mohan. Karbovanec in an interview with journalist Kim Bolan of the Vancouver Sun stated that hearing Eileen Mohan speak on television had persuaded him to come forward and confess. One of the neighbors of the Bacon family told Langton in an interview that the arrest of Jamie Bacon on April 3, 2009, at his parents' Strathcona Court house: "It was like a movie, a war movie. The cops looked like soldiers, all dressed in black with body armor and heavy weapons." Jamie did not resist arrest and was led into a police cruiser wearing his Red Scorpions hoodie and track pants. Rob Gordon, a criminologist at Simon Fraser University was not impressed with the arrest, saying: "There is a colossal drug industry operating behind these kinds of individuals who, to my mind, are actually fairly low down on the pecking order". However, Langton argued that the arrest of Jamie was a turning point in the gang war as: "Many Lower Mainland youth idolized the gangsters, especially the Bacon brothers. Until the Surrey Six arrest, they appeared untouchable. Until that point, they were like the mythical gangsters of movies and popular music. They lived above the law, drove fancy cars and had the prettiest girls. They made millions selling drugs and they got away with murder". Langton wrote that the arrest of Jamie Bacon put a dent into their image. On April 4, 2009, Matthew Johnson, Cody Ray Haevischer and Jamie Bacon of the Red Scorpions were all charged with first-degree murder on the basis of Karbovanec's statement.

In June 2009, it emerged that the delivery people of Canada Post had been refusing to deliver the mail on Strathcona Court since April 2009 out of the fear of their lives, saying it was too dangerous, much to vexation of the other people living on Strathcona Court who complained that their mail was not being delivered. The delivery woman for Strathcona Court stated she saw Jamie Bacon being arrested on April 3, 2009 and was very "traumatized" by what she saw. Ken Mooney, the president of the Abbotsford local of the Canadian Union of Postal Workers, told the media: "This is the first time I have ever encountered this. Our employees are afraid to deliver there."

Between June–December 2009, Brassington had a torrid affair with the former girlfriend of Jamie Bacon, a woman known as "Jane Doe 1" due to a court order who agreed to testify for the Crown against Jamie Bacon. It was revealed after his guilty plea in 2019 that Brassington had billed the Crown for overtime pay while he was in fact drinking and having sex with "Jane Doe 1" in various luxury hotels in Calgary, Montreal, Toronto, Victoria, Halifax, and Vancouver between June–December 2009. The police misconduct later almost ruined the case against Jamie Bacon as his lawyers argued that much of testimony against him was perjury as the detectives were sleeping with the witnesses against him. The statements from two of the detectives who sought to explain their heavy drinking on the job as due to being allegedly incapable of rational thought left the evidence gathered by the first investigation wide open to attack from Jamie Bacon's lawyers. As a result, the police were forced to essentially restart the entire investigation anew, costing the Crown thousands of dollars and wasting countless hours of police time.

Upon G.L's return to the Lower Mainland, he was contacted by Wayne Scott on May 2, 2009, about the cocaine deal, saying that Jarrod wanted a sample of the cocaine before committing the money. G.L then signed a contract with the police to become an agent source informer, giving him immunity in exchange for a promise to testify at any trial. Jarrod was arrested in May 2009 on weapons charges, but released on bail. While wearing a wire, G.L recorded Jarrod speaking frankly about his desire to import cocaine from Mexico while G.L. tried to have Jarrod visit the warehouse that he rented in Vancouver. Jarrod was clearly unwilling to visit the warehouse despite G.L's best efforts out of fear of violating his bail conditions might send him to jail. Jarrod's backer seems to have abandoned the deal as Jarrod was recorded demanding starting in the summer that G.L. provide him with the cocaine on credit with a promise to pay him back later. At a meeting at the Scott household on August 2, 2009, Jarrod used an erasable marker board to write messages with G.L., but he sometimes spoke instead.

At another meeting at Scott's house on August 13, 2009, Jarrod spoke about the financing of the drug deal with G.L., who unknown to him recorded it on the wire he was wearing. At one point, Jarrod complained about having to pay upfront before the cocaine arrived, leading G.L. to speak about the financial details. Jarrod interrupted and told him: "We're not interested in how you do this because the more you tell me, the more I get worried that this is a set-up". In another conversation with G.L., Wayne Scott complained that his daughter Carly wanted all of the commission to go to herself, instead of him. On August 26, 2009, G.L phoned Scott to tell him that he had 72 kilograms of cocaine in his warehouse and charged that Jarrod was being cheap in demanding that G.L. give him $300,000 worth of cocaine with a promise to pay later. In response, Scott told G.L. that Jarrod would have the money. Jarrod was driven by his parents to Scott's house, but the drug deal did not go through. G.L. was angry when learned that Jarrod would pick up the cocaine at 10 pm, leading him to say to Scott on his cellphone: "You know what ten o'clock means to me? Pitch black and guns." Scott had to promised G.L. that Jarrod was not planning to rob him, despite his fears. Wayne Scott drove on past the warehouse when he saw cars that he felt might be police cars parked outside while Jarrod turned out not to have the money as he had promised. Jarrod later claimed he had no intention of paying for the cocaine, but rather he was planning to steal the cocaine. The deal seemed to collapsed on August 27, 2009, as G.L. had his last phone conversation with Wayne Scott that day as it appeared that Jarrod believed that G.L. might be an informer while it was apparent that Jarrod did not have the money that he promised to pay G.L.

On September 11, 2009, Jamie Bacon sued the Crown and warden Debbie Hawboldt of the Surrey Pretrial Services Centre, claiming that being held in solitary confinement was a form of torture. In the same lawsuit, Bacon also charged that cell 210 of the Surrey jail that he had lived in was full of "blood, feces and mucus" and his bed was a "vinyl-covered foam mat". Bacon charged that cell 227 was a considerable improvement as it had a shower, a television, and a microwave, but he complained that "mentally ill" prisoners had damaged the latter two. In 2010, a court ruled in favour of Bacon and ordered the Crown to pay him damages. On November 26, 2009, Jarrod Bacon and Wayne Scott were both arrested and charged with conspiracy to import cocaine based on what G.L. had recorded; Carly Scott was not charged. In a rare move, the Crown appealed the dismissal of the charges against Jonathan Bacon for the 2005 arrest, which Justice Donald Gardner had ruled was illegal because of the lack of a search warrant. The British Columbia Court of Appeal in an even rarer move upheld the Crown's appeal and reinstated the charges against Bacon, Cheng, and Burton.

== Murder of Jonathan Bacon ==
Jonathan Bacon together with Larry Amero of the Hells Angels and James Riach and Randy Naicker of the Independent Soldiers formed a group called the Wolfpack Alliance in 2010. The police had their first inkling of the existence of the group when Jonathan was frequently seen cruising Burrard Inlet with Amero on the latter's speed-boat named Steroids & Silicone. Langton wrote that the Castle Fun Park meeting of 2006 was "a recruiting meeting, with the Independent Soldiers (acting, as they always did, as the Hells Angels' proxy) luring the Bacon Brothers away from the increasingly independent and unreliable UN to the more docile and malleable Red Scorpions". The senior partner in the Wolfpack was Amero. The Hells Angels allowed their members to have "side operations" provided that the rest of the chapter is informed and allowed a cut of the profits. Other members of the Wolfpack Alliance were the Alkhalil family of Montreal and Ottawa; Johnny Raposo and Martino Caputo of Toronto; Shane Maloney of the Montreal's West End Gang; and Nick Nero, a drug smuggler from Niagara Falls. The journalists Peter Edwards and Luis Nájera wrote that the Wolfpack Alliance were "...a loosely allied and multi-ethnic group of mostly Millennial-aged gangsters who operated across the country".

A gangster who turned against gangster lifestyle was Gurmit Singh Dhak, the co-boss of the Dhak-Duhre gang. The Dhak-Duhre group was allied with the United Nations gang. After being shot and wounded in a restaurant, Dhak contacted the Odd Squad (youth engagement unit) of the RCMP about making an anti-gang video for high school students. In a video made in June 2010, Dhak stated the swaggering, macho aggression of the gangsters hid a deep insecurity as he stated that to live the life of a gangster was to live in fear, never knowing when someone would try to kill him and never knowing who to trust. Dhak stated: "...if I could turn back time, I would never do it again. Every day I've got to look over my shoulder; I've got to worry about my family, I've got to worry about, like, if I jump out of my car, am I going to get shot? Or, you know, I could be walking in the mall and walking out and getting shot. I don't know...Oh, I want to get out. But it's too late now to get out. I have too many enemies". On October 16, 2010, Dhak's prescience about his imminent demise was proved correct when he was murdered with his corpse being found in his BMW automobile in the parking lot of the Metrotown Mall in Burnaby. The cause of Dhak's death was being shot in the face. Sukhveer "Sukh" Dhak, the younger brother of Gurmit, believed that the Wolfpack gang and that Amero, Riach, and Jonathan Bacon in particular were the ones responsible for his brother's murder. Dhak vowed to avenge his brother's murder. The police believe that the Wolfpack group was indeed responsible for the murder of Gurmit Dhak, but have stated there was insufficient evidence to lay charges given that the killer of Dhak has never been identified.

The younger Dhak had hired a team of four hitmen to hunt down the Wolfpack and stayed in touch with them via encrypted text messages on his cellphone. The hit-team placed GPS tracking devices on bottoms of automobiles belonging to the Wolfpack as a way to track then down. On August 13, 2011, Dhak received word via an encrypted text that GPS tracking showed that all the leaders of the Wolfpack were staying at the Delta Grand Hotel in Kelowna. In response, Dhak sent out a hit-team consisting of Jason McBride and Michael Jones from Vancouver, to be joined by Jujhar Khun-Khun and Manjinder "Manny" Hairan who travelled separately. Dhak wanted to see the Wolfpack wiped out, sending texts to the four hitmen, saying this was a chance to finally avenge his brother. McBride, who once had been given a gift of golden balls with Chinese characters worth $6,000 on them by Gurmit, was especially keen on avenging his friend. McBride had attended Gurmit's funeral in October 2010 and had been pressing "Sukh" Dhak for revenge ever since the funeral.

On August 14, 2011, Jonathan was murdered via gunfire outside the Delta Grand Hotel in Kelowna, BC. At about 2:45 pm on August 14, 2011, a white Porsche Cayenne carrying six people was leaving the parking lot of the Delta Grand Hotel, when a group of four masked gunmen carrying AK-47 assault rifles opened fire. The gunmen fired at least 30 shots into the Cayenne, killing Bacon, wounding Amero, and leaving a 21-year waitress, Leah Hadden-Watts, a quadriplegic as she took a bullet straight through her neck, severing her spinal cord. Lyndsey Black, another woman in the Cayenne took bullets through both her thighs. Bacon took bullets to his left lung, stomach, spleen, left kidney, bowel, and bladder causing him to be spasmatic as he fell out of the Cayenne, bleeding badly while having lost complete control of his bowels and bladder. Bacon died a few minutes later of massive blood loss despite the attempts to save his life via CPR. Larry Amero, a full-patch member of the Hells Angels, was also critically injured in the attack. Riarch was also in the Cayanne and fled from the scene, bleeding and in panic. Riarch ended up going to the Philippines, under the grounds that Canada was too dangerous for him. The attack proved to be a major setback for Wolf Pack with one of its members killed, another in a hospital and a third seen widely as a coward as the parking lot's security cameras showed Riarch fleeing from the Cayenne. After the attack, McBride sent an encrypted text to one of his associates, Amir "Moonbat" Eghtesad: "Hahaha ya bro there's gonna be crazy heat and I'm gonna chill at home till I get to dot [Toronto] on Fri".

On January 17, 2012, Sandip "Dippy" Duhre, the co-boss of the Dhak-Duhre group was shot dead while leaving a Vancouver hotel in a revenge attack for the Delta Grand Hotel incident. Naicker was shot dead outside of a Starbucks café in Port Moody on June 25, 2012. On November 19, 2012, Sukhveer "Sukh" Dhak and his bodyguard Thomas Mantel were murdered. Manjinder Hairan, one of the gunmen who killed Bacon was in turn was killed on January 14, 2013, in Surrey. Dean Michael Wiwchar was charged with killing Duhre with the Crown alleging he was a hitman for the Wolfpack. In 2018, Riach was convicted of drug trafficking in the Philippines and sentenced to life imprisonment.

Jason McBride, Jujhar Khun-Khun, and Michael Kerry Hunter Jones were charged with the shooting. On May 1, 2018, McBride in a plea bargain with the Crown pleaded guilty to second-degree murder for the Delta Grand Hotel attack while Khun-Khun and Jones also made plea bargains, pleading guilty to conspiracy to commit murders. In their agreed statement of facts as part of their plea bargains, Khun-Khun, Jones, and McBride stated that Sukhveer Dhak hired them to kill the Wolfpack as revenge for the murder of Gurmit Dhak. Superintendent Pat Fogarty of the Combined Forces Special Enforcement Unit stated that the oldest Bacon's death and the incarceration of the other two brothers will create such turmoil among the leadership of the gang that the popularity and influence of the Red Scorpions will decrease within the British Columbia gang world.

== The Trial of Jarrod Bacon ==
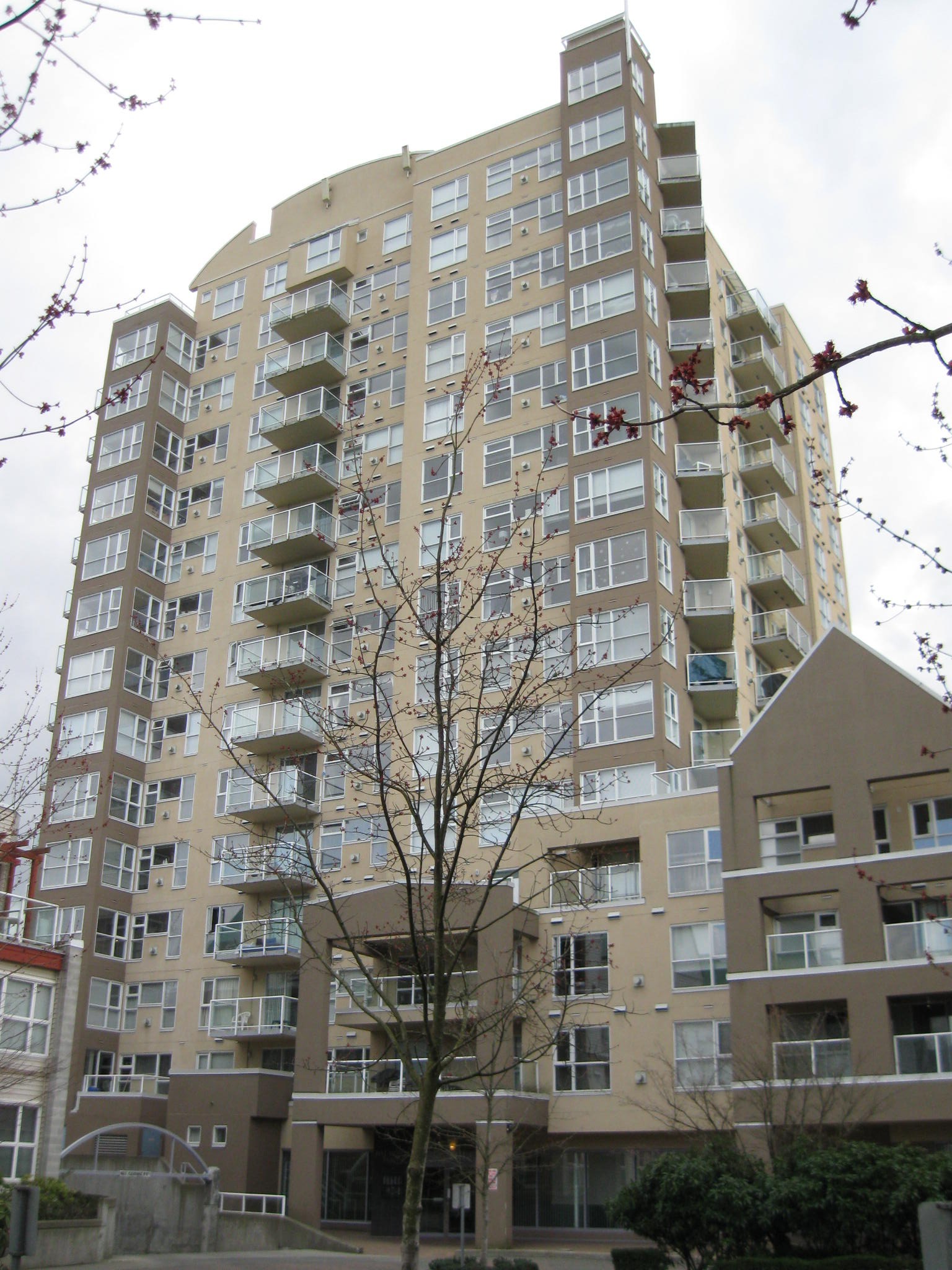
The Balmoral Tower Highrise building

In November 2010, David and Susan Bacon put their house at 35475 Strathcona Court on the real estate market with a listed price of $579,700. Randy Dyck, the realtor in charge of selling the property advertised the house as the "infamous Bacon house". Eileen Mohan stated about the real estate ad promoting the "infamous Bacon house" that: "It is almost like they are suggesting the Bacons are the celebrities of the day. I think it is very inappropriate." In December 2010, the Bacon family sold their house at 35475 Strathcona Court and moved to a new, unknown location.

During his trial in 2011–2012 on the charges to import cocaine, Jarrod spoke frequently to the media, saying it was outrageous that the police had charged his girlfriend's father, Wayne Scott, alongside him, saying: "I feel bad for Wayne. He is a victim in this". Jarrod came across as an angry young man in his interviews as he demanded that various newspapers be shut down for printing what he called "lies" about himself and his family. Journalist Kim Bolan, the crime correspondent of The Vancouver Sun newspaper, wrote about Jarrod's demand that newspapers lose their "licenses" that one does not need a "license" to operate a newspaper in Canada, which she used as evidence that Jarrod has a very poor understanding of how the media works. Bolan also wrote that: "Bacon doesn’t seem to get that covering court cases is legal and legitimate and that things said in court are covered by privilege, which extends to allegations against others not charged." Bolan wrote that Jarrod came across as arrogant on the stand as he openly admitted that he never abided by his bail conditions because he "thought they were a joke." Bacon testified on January 10, 2012 that he never intended to abide by his bail conditions, saying: "“I was in the hole for 41 days and I wanted to get out, so I lied".

Jarrod admitted that he was a gangster, calling himself a "professional street fighter", but vehemently denied media reports that his parents were involved in his gangster activities. Jarrod testified at his trial that he was not going to buy the cocaine from G.L, but rather he was planning to steal it. The penalty for a conviction for conspiracy to commit theft is a lesser one compared to the penalty for a conviction for a conspiracy to traffic in narcotics. Jarrod's statements on the stand that neither Carly Scott nor Wayne Scott were aware of his robbery plans left both exposed to the claims of the prosecution that they were indeed attempting to broker a cocaine deal.

Jarrod was furious when a wire recording of Wayne Scott telling G.L. that the parents of the Bacon brothers were involved in their sons' activities was introduced as evidence. On October 18, 2011, a wire-tape of a conversation that G.L held with Wayne Scott on August 27, 2009 was played in court as evidence where Scott stated that both David and Susan Bacon were deeply involved in organized crime and were taking part in the meetings for the cocaine deal. The Crown Attorney who prosecuted Jarrod at his trial in 2011–2012, Peter LaPrairie, stated to him on January 11, 2012: "“I am going to suggest to you that both your father and your mother knew exactly what was going on because they were present the night before when you and Wayne sat at their dining room table and wrote out the instructions on the green board". As he usually did when it was suggested that his parents were involved in crime, Jarrod exploded in fury, shouting with much rage: "That is completely false. If they thought I was doing anything wrong they would have pulled my bail and sent me back to jail. They were shocked and in tears when I got arrested for this."

Bolan wrote that Jarrod's claims that he was not a drug dealer were doubtful in her opinion as she noted that Jarrod testified that he was planning to steal $3 million worth of cocaine from G.L, but he claimed not to have any idea about what he was going to do with the cocaine once he had stolen it. Bolan wrote that in her view that Jarrod's testimony was damaging to himself as he openly admitted that he had lied to get what he desired; bragged incessantly about the number of people he had beaten up; frequently exploded in rage on the stand; and arrogantly refused to answer questions from the Crown Attorney, Peter LaPrairie, giving the impression of a man who felt that he was above the law. When LaPraire asked Bacon about a meeting he planned to have with someone named Gino, Bacon refused to say who Gino was, and instead took a sneering tone as he stated that "Gino is a common European name".

Jarrod Bacon testified that his drug addiction drove him to crime, saying that he was paranoid and desperate for money since he was a high school student owing to his heavy use of cocaine, OxyContin and steroids. Jarrod was found guilty on February 2, 2012, of several charges relating to cocaine trafficking. Wayne Scott who had no previous criminal convictions was also convicted in the same trial. On May 4, 2012, Jarrod was sentenced to 12 years in prison for conspiracy to traffic cocaine with Justice Austion Cullen ruling that the fact that Jarrod had never held a job, his long criminal history and "the circumstances of his life and experience to this point do not permit much optimism for his rehabilitation or inclination towards a law-abiding life". The sentence was then reduced to seven years and two months after time served was taken into consideration.

In September 2009, the Integrated Gang Task Force reported that eight associates were murdered since the public warning by the police that those associated with Jon, Jarrod, and Jamie avoid the trio or be potentially killed by rival criminals.

== The Trial of Jamie Bacon ==
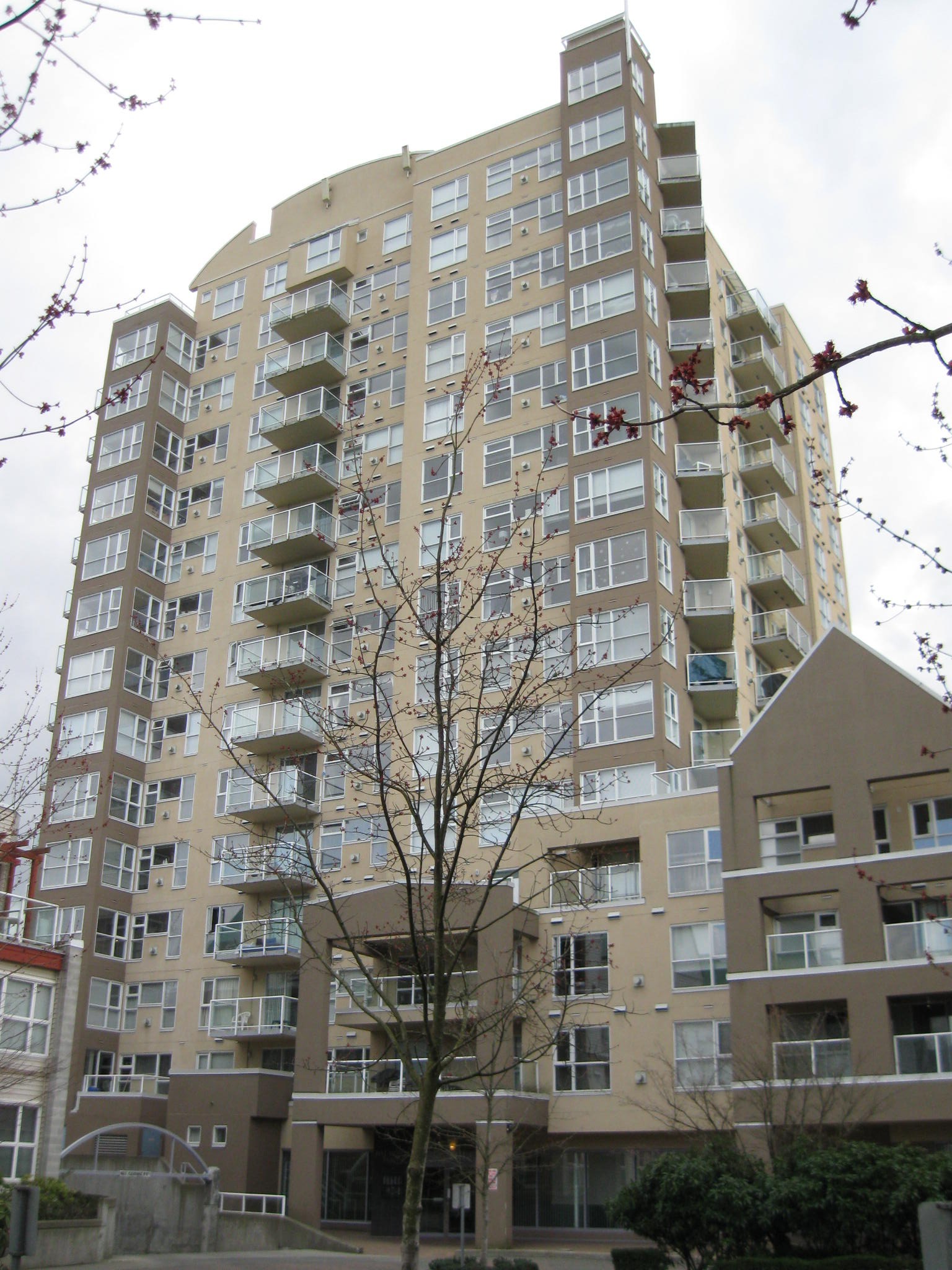
The Balmoral Tower Highrise building

On April 3, 2009, Jamie was arrested by the RCMP Emergency response team for his role in the October 19, 2007, shootings of the 'Surrey Six' which included two innocent victims: Chris Mohan and Ed Schellenberg at the Balmoral Tower Highrise building in Surrey, British Columbia, Canada. This development occurred after an associate of the Bacon brothers, Dennis Karbovanec, pleaded guilty to his role in the shootings.

While awaiting trial, Jamie and his co-accused were being held in isolation. B.C. Corrections Service said this measure was for their own protection because other rivals are also in custody awaiting several trials. In what legal observers said was an unusual request, Jamie appealed to the Supreme Court of British Columbia to end his solitary confinement as a violation of his rights under the Canadian Charter of Rights and Freedoms. The Court found that Jamie was subjected to cruel and unusual treatment while in custody, contrary to section 12 of the Canadian Charter of Rights and Freedoms and that he was subjected to such treatment for the purpose of furthering the police investigation. His conditions of confinement were also found to constitute a deprivation of liberty and security of person that was not in accordance with the principles of fundamental justice, contrary to section 7 of the Charter. During the course of the hearing, the court learned that Jamie's privileged telephone calls with his counsel were unlawfully recorded. This matter remains before the Court. Jamie was released into the general prison population and the restrictions on his visits and telephone communications were removed.

In May 2010, Jamie was convicted of all 11 charges related to the April 2007 discovery of a gun cache but Jarrod was acquitted.

The trial for Jamie Bacon in connection with the Surrey Six case was delayed when it was revealed that Staff Sergeant Derek Brassington of the Surrey RCMP, who led the investigation into the Surrey Six case, had an affair with a key witness for the Crown, a model and a former girlfriend of Jamie Bacon. The woman is only known as "Jane Doe 1" due to a court order. "Jane Doe 1" was willing to testify that Jamie Bacon, who was her boyfriend at the time of the Surrey Six massacre, was involved in the massacre, which caused her to receive death threats. The affair became public when "Jane Doe 1" became pregnant with Brassington's child, and became angry that Brassington refused to leave his wife for her. The lawyers for Bacon sought to have the case dismissed, alleging perjury by the woman in question. Brassington was charged with obstruction of justice for his initial attempts to deny the affair to internal affairs detectives as were his superior, Inspector David Attew together with Constable Paul Johnson and Constable Danny Michaud, all of whom knew of the affair. The lawyers for Brassington claimed that his "inappropriate relationship" with a key witness was due to job stress, but that he did not counsel her to commit perjury against Bacon as the defense lawyers were claiming. However, the judges excluded the "Jane Doe 1" as a witness from the trial against Jamie, ruling that her relationship with Brassington meant there was a possibility of perjury, but refused to dismiss the charges as there was other evidence against Jamie besides for the statements of "Jane Doe 1".

Justice Kathleen Ker who was overseeing the case ordered a stay in 2017 because of the police misconduct "contravened fundamental notions of justice and undermined the integrity of the justice system to the degree [the judge] could not permit the case to be tried." On December 1, 2017, Ker ordered a stay on the proceedings against Bacon because the way that Brassington and the other detectives handed the case. Ker stated she had serious concerns about "...the manner in which the police handled aspects of privileged and confidential information". The Crown appealed, and the appeals court ruled that the case could continue.

In 2019, Brassington, Attew, and Michaud were all found guilty of various charges of misconduct for their handling of the Surrey Six case. On January 19, 2019, the disgraced Brassington made a plea bargain with the Crown, where he made guilty pleas to charges of breach of trust and compromising the integrity and safety of a witness in exchange for a lesser sentence. At his sentencing, Brassington cried hysterically in the courtroom as he admitted that his affair with "Jane Doe 1" had ruined his career, led to his marriage ending in divorce and the estrangement of his children, saying: "As a dad I shouldn't have done this. As a father I shouldn't have done this. As a cop I shouldn't have done this". Brassington stated about "Jane Doe" that: "I treated her like a girlfriend. I didn't mean to fall in love with her". Journalist Rhianna Schunk attended the sentencing and described Brassington as a broken man who between his sobs seemed to have much self-pity for himself as he sought to portray himself as a victim, claiming that the affair was caused by work-related stress. Brassington maintained amid his sobs and tears that his job stress was such that he had no choice but to engage in an affair with an attractive vicenarian model despite his best intentions. The Crown dropped the charges against Johnson on March 5, 2019 because he was dying of Hodgkin lymphoma.

With "Jane Doe 1" excluded as a witness, the Crown's case against Jamie Bacon was weak. On July 8, 2020, the Crown made a plea bargain where the first-degree murder charges against Bacon were dropped in exchange for him pleading guilty to counselling murder. Eileen Mohan called the plea bargain "a sweetheart deal" for Bacon who received a relatively light sentence for ordering the Surrey Six massacre. At Bacon's sentencing hearing on September 10, 2020, Justice Kathleen Ker sentenced Bacon to 18 years. Mohan's appeals to Ker to overturn the joint submission by the Crown and the defense counsel and impose a life sentence on Bacon were ignored. Ker stated that the "egregious misconduct" of the Mounties investigating the case with Brassington sleeping with a key witness meant she could not impose a life sentence on Bacon. Ker stated that because of the "egregious misconduct" of Brassington and the rest of the detectives that 18 years in prison with credit for time served in jail was the most severe sentence she could impose on Bacon. Mohan was profoundly disappointed with Bacon's sentence, which she felt was far too lenient, saying: "Mr. Bacon gets to return home to his mother's arms. Today we celebrated his life...his rights...instead of celebrating Christopher. I don't know what tomorrow brings...but today is really, really difficult to accept. I want to respect the process, but I think the process is not respecting us in return."

== Current status ==
- Jamie Bacon, pleaded guilty to conspiracy for Surrey Six murders in September 2020; serving five years and seven months after factoring nearly 12 years in pre-trial detention. He was released in April 2026.
- Jarrod Bacon, parole revoked, returned to prison in September 2017; paroled in August 2020.
- Jonathan Bacon, the oldest of the trio, murdered in Kelowna in 2011.

In 2005, an attempted murder charge against Jarrod was stayed after the victim refused to testify at trial. In 2005, the police seized more than 700 marijuana plants and various pieces of pot-growing equipment and charged Jarrod and a friend with possession for the purpose of trafficking.

Jamie pleaded guilty to robbery in 2007 in connection with a 2005 home invasion where a man was confined in his Abbotsford home and robbed of marijuana plants and growing-operation equipment. He was sentenced to time served. Jarrod Bacon has frequently violated his parole conditions by being involved in a bar fight in 2017 and substance abuse after failing a cocaine test in 2018. On December 15, 2020, Bacon's parole officer visited him and Bacon stated that he could not answer the door because he was naked. However, a policeman went into the backyard and looked through the window. Véronique Buisson of the National Parole Board wrote in her judgement on March 17, 2021, that the policeman "saw you through a window of the back of the apartment. He reported that you were fully dressed, that you were going quickly between two rooms and that you retrieved a cellphone from under couch cushions...[the policeman] saw you sliding your finger across the screen of the phone numerous times and clicking after each swipe, suggesting that you were deleting information. You then passed the phone to your partner who hid it in her bosom." Buisson noted that she found his behavior highly suspicious and believed that he may very well had returned to selling drugs, but she decided not to revoke his parole. Buisson wrote "File information reveals that you are identified as a member of the Red Scorpions and the Bacon Brothers organization, which is very influential in Western Canada, and has links with a notorious criminal organization", an apparent reference to the Hells Angels, which are often described by the parole board as "a notorious criminal organization".

On April 23, 2022, an audio-tape from Jamie Bacon was released to the media. On the tape, Bacon condemned the Wolfpack Alliance together with the Indo-Canadian Brothers Keepers gang in racist and homophobic language. Bacon attacked the Hells Angels, saying: "These guys are all goofs. They all play all sides of the game. Almost every biker is working with the police. OK. I’ve seen it bro...They think that they’re gods, and they are little goofs that need to be locked up in the (Secure Housing Unit) and die with their teeth and hair falling out." Langton wrote "Although it may sound childish and comical, the word 'goof' is considered perhaps the worst insult" in the Canadian underworld, further noting that: "At least two murders in Kingston [prison] alone since the '80s were reported to be the result of someone calling someone else the G-word". Bacon did not express remorse for his crimes, but declared his willingness to testify for the Crown as a way to be released from prison early.

== Publications ==
- Edwards, Peter; Nájera, Luis (2021). The Wolfpack The Millennial Mobsters Who Brought Chaos and the Cartels to the Canadian Underworld. Toronto: Random House of Canada. ISBN 9780735275409.
- Langton, Jerry (2010). Showdown: How the Outlaws, Hells Angels and Cops Fought for Control of the Streets. Toronto: John Wiley & Sons. ISBN 978-0470678787.
- Langton, Jerry (2013). The Notorious Bacon Brothers: Inside gang warfare on Vancouver streets. Etobicoke, Ont.: J. Wiley and Sons Canada. ISBN 978-1118388679.
