= Ion Croitoru =

Canadian professional wrestler (1963-2017)

Personal information
- Born: Ion William Croitoru; December 7, 1963 Hamilton, Ontario, Canada
- Died: February 21, 2017 (aged 53) Toronto, Ontario, Canada
- Children: 3

Professional wrestling career
- Ring name(s): Bruiser Bedlam; Johnny K-9; K-9 Dog Of War; Taras Bulba; Orhan Turgedan, The Terrible Turk; The Mysterian
- Billed height: 6 ft 0 in (1.83 m)
- Billed weight: 300 lb (140 kg)
- Billed from: Hamilton, Ontario; Romania (WWF)
- Trained by: Nick DeCarlo; Vic Rosettani
- Debut: 1984
- Retired: 1998

Ion William Croitoru (December 7, 1963 – February 21, 2017) was a Canadian professional wrestler and outlaw biker, known to wrestling fans by his ring names Johnny K-9, Taras Bulba and Bruiser Bedlam. Croitoru worked in several Canadian wrestling promotions, including Stampede Wrestling, and later wrestled for New Japan Pro-Wrestling, Smoky Mountain Wrestling (SMW) and the World Wrestling Federation (WWF, now WWE). He wrestled as a jobber in the WWF but was booked to win titles in several other promotions.

Croitoru was notorious for his long history of legal problems. As a member of the Satan's Choice Motorcycle Club (SCMC), an outlaw biker gang, he was convicted of assault, trafficking cocaine and bombing a police station. In 2005, Croitoru was arrested for the murder of lawyer Lynn Gilbank and her husband Fred; the charges were eventually dropped due to insufficient evidence. Croitoru was then arrested in May 2009 for conspiracy to murder the Bacon Brothers, resulting in the killing of Jonathan Barber. He pleaded guilty in July 2013 to conspiracy in exchange for a stay of proceedings on the murder charge.

Croitoru was the focus of a third season episode of the Vice TV documentary series Dark Side of the Ring.

== Early life ==
Ion William Croitoru was born to Romanian parents in Hamilton, Ontario, Canada. He grew up in the working class district of East Hamilton and as a teenager exercised at a local gym known as Bad Boy's. Before entering professional wrestling, Croitoru claimed that he played junior hockey for the Kitchener Rangers in the Ontario Hockey League. According to the journalist Paul Legall of The Hamilton Spectator, Croitoru only played very briefly for the Rangers, going on to write: "But a coach-who didn't like his bruising style-bounced him and squelched any dreams he had of professional hockey." However, no record of Croitoru's time with the Rangers can be found. He was an accomplished weightlifter and once bench pressed 625 pounds.

== Professional wrestling career ==
=== Early career (1984–1994) ===
Sometime in the early 1980s, Croitoru, then working a bouncer in a Hamilton bar, was recruited into professional wrestling after being observed by a patron who happened to be a wrestler. He trained with Nick DeCarlo and Victor Rosettani Sr. before debuting in Stampede Wrestling in 1984. Bruce Hart gave Croitoru the ring name Orhan Turgedan, the Terrible Turk, a name he only wrestled under for a short time after leaving the promotion. Croitoru continued to wrestle in independent promotions across Canada, such as Grand Prix Wrestling in the Maritimes and Superstars of Wrestling in Windsor, Ontario.

In 1985, Croitoru entered the United States wrestling scene and joined the American Wrestling Association (AWA), where he received a push and was given a reign as AWA Southern Heavyweight champion. He defeated Jerry Lawler to win the belt on August 16, but dropped it back to Lawler in a rematch on September 6. The following month, Croitoru joined the World Wrestling Federation (WWF, now WWE) as Johnny K-9, where he competed until 1989. Croitoru claimed that he decided on this name while being arrested after a fight; he saw "K-9" written on a paddywagon and decided on the ring name.

Croitoru's signature moves were the Stomach Claw and the Flying Headbutt. Standing six feet tall, shaved completely bald and sporting a Fu Manchu moustache, he was typecast as a heel who excelled in generating heat (fan anger) by his exploits in the ring. Croitoru usually showed up in the ring wearing black tights and a collar around his neck, and proceeded to generate heat from the audiences before his matches started. One television commentator stated that Croitoru's fighting style was "like an animal or a dog." Canadian journalist Adrian Humphreys called him a "hugely entertaining and dirty fighter" whose antics made him natural as a heel. Croitoru liked his "bad boy" image, once telling a reporter he was the "baddest of the bad," going on to say, "You can print that. I want everyone to know."

Croitoru worked as a jobber to the stars, putting over such wrestlers as Pedro Morales, Tito Santana and Paul Orndorff. He wrestled in many tag team matches and formed a short-lived team with Barry O in 1986, but his biggest match in the WWF was a televised bout against Hulk Hogan.

In his hometown of Hamilton, Croitoru was considered a celebrity and was generally known as "Johnny K-9." Croitoru himself usually used that name when signing documents, and was even able to open up a bank account under the moniker. However, he was only a jobber, which journalist Jerry Langton noted was "a hard way to make a living, even by Hamilton standards."

Hamilton was once known as "Steeltown," being a largely working-class city made up of immigrants from the British Isles, Italy and Eastern Europe, who were attracted by the high wages offered in the steel industry. At its height of its prosperity, three-quarters of all the steel produced in Canada came from Hamilton. With the decline of the steel industry, however, Hamilton went into a steep economic downturn, becoming a Canadian version of American Rust Belt cities. This decline ensured that anyone from Hamilton who was successful at anything, even as a wresting jobber, was bound to become well-known. The mere fact that Croitoru had wrestled Hulk Hogan made him famous, all the more so as many of the blue-collar citizens of Hamilton were fans of professional wrestling. Langton wrote that at the height of his fame, Croitoru "...could barely walk a block in downtown Hamilton without someone offering to buy him a beer."

After leaving the WWF, Croitoru wrestled on a tour of Japan for New Japan Pro-Wrestling; he later returned to Japan to compete for Frontier Martial-Arts Wrestling and Wrestle Association R. In the late 1980s, Croitoru also worked as a promoter along with Mike Kelly and Bob Clarke, operating the short-lived Canadian International Championship Wrestling in Hamilton. During his wrestling career, Croitoru's persona changed from that of Middle Eastern or Eastern European heels such as the Terrible Turk and Taras Bulba to working class babyfaces such as Bruiser Bedlam.

In 1989, Croitoru was convicted of drug possession. At trial he stated that the lengthy road trips required by his wrestling career had led him to abuse cocaine to ease the tedium of his existence. Croitoru also admitted to his weakness for the "fast life," saying he liked expensive cars and staying out late at nightclubs. In 1993, Croitoru opened up a gym called Bad Boy's in Burlington, named after the gym he had patronized in his youth. In September 1993, Croitoru was convicted of forgery, being fined CA$500 and placed on probation.

=== Smoky Mountain Wrestling (1994) ===
Croitoru joined Smoky Mountain Wrestling (SMW) in 1994, where he was given the ring name Bruiser Bedlam. According to the storyline, he was brought in by manager Jim Cornette to help settle Cornette's feud with Bob Armstrong.

Cornette later explained his reasons for the Bruiser Bedlam moniker as: "He was 6’0" tall, 270 lbs (billed at 300), built like a fireplug, bald-headed, barrel-chested with tattoos and a legitimate 600 lbs bench presser with a mean look. I was always looking for heels to take back to Smoky Mountain, and Johnny K-9 was not a name that thrilled me. I was a big Dick the Bruiser fan when I was a kid, and this guy had the big bruiser, Brock Lesnar type look to him. Bruiser Bedlam Wrestling was the clip compilation show Bruiser's WWA ended on in the early ’80s. And Bedlam was a famous mental institution in England in the olden days (the word bedlam now signifies chaos, mayhem, and confusion), so Bruiser Bedlam became his new name." Cornette stated that Croitoru never moved to Tennessee during his time in SMW, and instead drove down from Hamilton every weekend for his matches.

Croitoru and Cornette combined for a victory in a two-on-one handicap match over Armstrong at SMW's Blue Grass Brawl II show on April 1, 1994. As the year continued, Croitoru wrestled many tag team and six-man matches while teaming with Cornette. One observer, Edward Pardue, recalled: "A 'newcomer' debuted in SMW in the spring of 1994 named Bruiser Bedlam. Looking at this man on television, I got the impression he wasn't one to be trifled with. Jim Cornette had found the man to beat Bob Armstrong and beat him he did. Johnny 'Bruiser Bedlam' K-9 even got a pinfall victory over Randy Savage. There was no stopping Bruiser Bedlam in SMW...he left in pursuit of other territories to conquer. All I know is, if I ever had to fight Tyson in a street fight, that is one guy I would want to back me up!"

Cornette later stated that he was aware that Croitoru was involved in crime during his time in SMW, but maintained that he was only a petty criminal who liked to exaggerate his importance in the underworld. Cornette declared: "That was some people telling him-and I'm not trying to excuse this guy's crimes-but people were telling him, ‘You take this suitcase, and you take it to these people at this place and get the money they give you and bring it back.’ He was the guy nobody was going to fuck with on either side of that transaction. It wasn't like he was the kingpin from Colombia, El Guapo [translated as ‘The Handsome One’]. So he went to prison, and he was always in prison for conspiracy, and unfortunately, a lot has been heavily overstated because he was with these people and did what they told him to do. But I'd be greatly surprised if he ever killed anybody."

Croitoru was booked for one title reign with the SMW Beat the Champ Television Championship during his stint in SMW. The kayfabe rules behind the title state that any wrestler winning five consecutive matches as champion would win $5,000 but be forced to vacate the title. Croitoru won a match against Mike Furnas on April 4 to win the title, and he defended it over the following month. He won his fifth match on May 2 with a victory over Anthony Michaels, and the storyline saw him forced to give up the title. On May 20, Croitoru defeated Randy Savage with help from Dory Funk Jr. He went on to feud with Tracy Smothers, and the two wrestled in a lengthy series of matches, including several Coalminer's glove matches, in which a glove is available for the wrestlers to use as a weapon. Later that in 1994, Croitoru wrestled several matches against Tony Anthony. The series consisted of several steel cage matches in which Croitoru put Anthony over, as well as tag team matches where Croitoru teamed with Cornette and Anthony teamed with Ron Wright.

=== Late career (1994–1998, 2013) ===
In 1994, Croitoru also began wrestling in Midwest Territorial Wrestling, an independent promotion based in Michigan. He continued using the ring name Taras Bulba and proclaimed himself "King of chain matches." Croitoru competed in a tournament to determine the promotion's first heavyweight champion, but Al Snow defeated him in the final round. He was pushed for a run with the belt, however, defeating Mickey Doyle on January 21, 1995, to win the vacant title. He held the championship for almost four months before dropping it to Marty Jannetty.

As Johnny K-9, Croitoru returned to the WWF, where he defeated Gary Scott in a dark match on January 23, 1995. Cornette had booked the match in the hope that Croitoru might be able to return to the WWF, but the company was not interested. Croitoru then competed briefly in Cleveland All Pro Wrestling, where he wrestled against Cactus Jack in a booked loss on March 23. He also wrestled in Border City Wrestling (BCW) and was pushed to win the BCW Can-Am Heavyweight Championship by defeating Scott D'Amore on May 21, 1995. He held the title for a little over a month before dropping it back to D'Amore.

Once again using the ring name Bruiser Bedlam, Croitoru wrestled for Insane Championship Wrestling for a short time in 1996. While there, he competed in a barbed wire baseball bat match against Ian Rotten; Croitoru was booked for the victory in the match. He also wrestled New Jack at Insane Championship's Holiday Hell supercard in a match that ended in a double countout. He wrestled on World Championship Wrestling's first annual Ilio DiPaolo tribute show, teaming with Cowboy Danny Johnson in a loss to Tony Parisi and Dominic DeNucci. In the late 1990s, Croitoru wrestled in Cambridge, Ontario-based International Championship Wrestling. He feuded with Greg Valentine, and the two wrestled in a series of matches. Croitoru won the ICW Heavyweight Championship from Valentine and used heel tactics such as brass knuckles to defend the belt.

In the 2000s, Croitoru trained several wrestlers, including Pure Wrestling Association's Eddie Osbourne and Melissa Maughn. Croitoru wrestled his final match on June 6, 2013, where he defeated Panama Wasp at Thrash Wrestling in Lumby, British Columbia.

== Criminal career ==
=== Satan's Choice Motorcycle Club ===
Croitoru was notorious for his legal history. After his income dwindled following his departure from the WWF in 1991, Croitoru wrestled in what were described as "down-market" leagues. He had been selling illegal steroids for a number of years, and through another steroid dealer known to the media only as "Jimmy Rich" (a court-ordered pseudonym, as "Jimmy Rich" is now living in witness protection after turning Crown's evidence), he came into contact with the Satan's Choice Motorcycle Club (SCMC), an outlaw motorcycle club.

After joining SCMC's Toronto chapter, Croitoru was allowed to found a new chapter in Hamilton, with himself as the chapter president, in 1995. Croitoru had gained the approval of SCMC national president Bernie Guindon to have his club return to Hamilton for the third time; the first SCMC Hamilton chapter had "patched over" to join the Outlaws in 1977, while the second SCMC Hamilton chapter had disbanded itself following the murders of two of its members by the Outlaws in August 1985.

Croitoru's notoriety as a wrestler in Hamilton allowed him to attract many recruits for his chapter. The clubhouse for the Hamilton chapter was located in a former convenience store at 269 Lottridge Street, about six blocks away from the Outlaws clubhouse at 402 Birch Avenue. The Outlaws Hamilton chapter had been an SCMC chapter until 1977, so the choice of location was considered to be a provocation. The decision to open a third SCMC chapter in Hamilton was regarded as an insult to Mario Parente, the president of the Outlaws' Hamilton chapter. One policeman stated: "Oh, they hated Parente. And they knew it would piss him off to have another club in what he considered to be his town." The pool table for the SCMC Hamilton clubhouse was donated by Pasquale "Fat Pat" Musitano, the boss of the Musitano crime family.

Detective Sergeant Len Isnor, the head of the Ontario Provincial Police's (OPP) Anti-Biker Enforcement Unit, was not impressed with Croitoru, saying: "After a while, you can tell who's cut out for the life and who isn't. I could tell right away that he wouldn't make it. Some of the guys would talk to you. If there was a guy who was really into bikes, you could talk bikes, but K-9 [Croitoru] would talk about anything, especially himself – he was just stupid that way." Croitoru was especially close to Michel Dubé, the president of SCMC Sudbury chapter, who was considered by Isnor to be the most dangerous outlaw biker in Ontario. Isnor recalled that he once talked to a biker and convicted murderer who was terrified of Dubé.

Both Croitoru and Dubé purchased the cocaine that their chapters sold from the Hells Angels' "mother chapter" in Montreal. Guindon had ruled that SCMC members were free to do business with the Angels. Richard "Rick" Vallée of the Angels' Nomad chapter sold the majority of the drugs purchased by SCMC's Hamilton and Sudbury chapters, which being new chapters did not have the same established drug-dealing connections that the older SCMC chapters had.

Lorne Edgar Campbell, a long-time member of SCMC, described Croitoru as being of limited intelligence but also being a fierce competitor would not accept any defeats, which Campbell found highly ironic given his previous work as a wrestling jobber. After the two men met at a party hosted by Dubé, Campbell defeated Croitoru several times in Indian leg-wrestling. Croitoru spent the rest of the party pestering Campbell to explain how he won, leading him to recall: "He wouldn't leave me alone. That night, he was like a dog following me around." Campbell finally explained: "As soon as you hook, you roll." At point, Croitoru had a rematch and won, leading Campbell to state: "When I showed him, he almost broke my back."

Croitoru was arrested for smuggling cocaine and served ten months in prison. Soon after, he was convicted of assault and was given a sentence of seven months.

In late 1996, during a visit to Sudbury to see Dubé, Croitoru and several other SCMC members attempted to enter the Solid Gold strip club, where he was informed in the parking lot that the club had a policy of refusing entrance to those wearing gang colors. Croitoru shouted, "We wear our colors wherever the fuck we want!" which inspired Dubé to shout "fuck yeah!" in agreement; the assembled SCMC bikers then attempted to enter the club wearing jackets with their SCMC patches, where the bouncers promptly refused them all entrance. When the bikers persisted with demanding entry, police were called. As the night progressed, Dubé brooded obsessively over the SCMC's humiliation at the Solid Gold. When he stated he would do anything to get revenge against the club's owners, Croitoru told him he knew someone in the Hamilton chapter who knew how to build bombs. Journalist Jerry Langton described Croitoru as an essentially weak character who was always too anxious to please those he considered friends, such as Dubé.

Croitoru enlisted Jure "Jerry" Juretta, a member of the SCMC Hamilton chapter and former soldier in the Canadian Army, to build a bomb. Croitoru and Juretta then handed the bomb to Dubé and vice president Brian Davies of the Sudbury chapter in a Tim Horton's coffee shop in South Sudbury. For unknown reasons, Dubé decided to bomb the local police station instead. The bombing, which took place on December 15, 1996, caused $133,000 in damages to both the police station and a nearby bank and injured a police officer. Croitoru seemed surprised that Dubé had decided to bomb the police station, shouting on his phone (which unknown to him had been tapped by the police): "What do you mean the police station? It was supposed to be the Solid Gold!" Croitoru, Dubé and Juretta were arrested and charged, but the trial did not begin until almost two years later.

Kenneth Murdock, a hitman, has claimed he was hired by the Musitano family to kill Croitoru but instead chose to spare his life. Murdock was given a list of four men to kill by his employers, Pasquale "Fat Pat" Musitano and his younger brother Angelo "Ang" Musitano. Murdock was to kill Johnny "the Enforcer" Papalia, the boss of the Papalia Mafia family; Carmen Barillaro, the right-hand man to Papalia; Mario Parente, the president of the Outlaws' Hamilton chapter, and finally Croitoru. The Musitano brothers wanted Croitoru killed because of his connections with the Hells Angels as they feared that he might allow the Angels to establish more influence in Hamilton at their expense. At the time, the Hells Angels had no chapters in Ontario, though their national president Walter Stadnick lived in Hamilton. Additionally, Croitoru had started to work for the rival Luppino family, which "Fat Pat" Musitano regarded as a betrayal. Murdock assassinated Papalia on May 31, 1997, and on killed Barillaro on July 23, 1997. On August 20, 1997, Murdock knocked on the door of Croitoru's house to tell him: "John, I've been sent here to kill you. But I'm not going to do it". Croitoru was left speechless for a moment before thanking Murdock. Unknown to the Musitano brothers, Murdock was a friend of Croitoru and could not bring himself to kill him. Shortly afterwards, Murdock was arrested on unrelated charges of extortion for the Musitano family, and while in police custody, the detectives played audio tapes of the Musitano brothers mocking and laughing at him, which inspired him to turn Crown's evidence and testify against his former employers.

While Croitoru was awaiting trial for the bombing, the Hamilton branch of Satan's Choice was shut down after an informant gave the police information about the gang's involvement with drug dealing and extortion. On April 16, 1998, the police raided the Satan's Choice Hamilton clubhouse. The gang's clubhouse was confiscated and the club's national leadership decided to disband the Hamilton chapter. Croitoru's attempt to transfer over to the Toronto chapter was rejected as it was felt that he was a loose cannon who was a liability for Satan's Choice. Croitoru got in a fight in Hamilton with another former Satan's Choice member, "Jimmy Rich", on January 13, 1998. A police officer saw Croitoru punch Rich in the face and arrested Croitoru for assault. In addition to the assault charge, Croitoru was charged with extortion from an unrelated incident as well as carrying a concealed weapon and breaking the conditions of his release following the police station bombing.

In September 1998, Croitoru was brought to trial for his role in the bombing. He was convicted and sentenced to 33 months in prison. Croitoru pleaded guilty to his role in having the bomb built. Besides for his role in the bombing, Croitoru was also convicted of illegally selling steroids, largely on the basis of the testimony of his former friend "Jimmy Rich". Dubé, who was facing two counts of murder plus charges relating to the bombing, hanged himself in jail on September 22, 1998. Isnor explained Dubé's suicide as: "Johnny K-9 was the only friend he had left in the world, and he knew that we had him, and he was going away forever."

=== The Gravelle family ===
The police maintained that Croitoru worked as an enforcer and a debt collector for the Gravelle family of Hamilton after he was expelled from Satan's Choice. Croitoru maintained that he rarely had to strike anyone as a debt collector because he was sufficiently intimidating to make people pay up. A couple named Smith who stated that they worked as drug smugglers for Denis and Paul Gravelle describe Croitoru as a regular visitor to Paul's house. According to Bill Smith, when one of the "runners" for the Gravelle family "mouthed off" to Paul Gravelle, Croitoru beat him bloody in the basement of Paul Gravelle's house. Smith stated he saw pieces of the runner's face "smeared all over the wall" and there was blood everywhere as Croitoru had broken his nose, jaw and orbital bone.

The Gravelle family were French-Canadians from northern Ontario, and Paul Gravelle in a 2005 interview stated when he moved to Hamilton, the only words in English he knew were: "Stick 'em up!" The Gravelle family were generally considered to be lesser players in the Hamilton crime scene, being only a fourth family behind the three main Mafia families in Hamilton, namely the Luppino, Musitano and Papalia families. Unlike the three Mafia families, the Gravelle family specialized in selling hashish. In 1992, the Gravelle brothers were arrested in connection with a shipment of 450 kilograms of hashish in Florida worth $14 million, for which André Gravelle served four years in prison while Paul Gravelle served two years.

After both Smiths were arrested at Toronto's Pearson Airport on February 11, 1998, with some $500,000 worth of hash in their bags while returning from Ocho Rios, they hired Lynn Gilbank as their lawyer. Gilbank felt that the Smiths were mere pawns and was outraged that members of the Gravelle family had been arrested many times, but had never done any serious prison time as they always shifted the blame onto their subordinates. Bill Smith stated that Lynn Gilbank had "a real hard-on for these people and she definitely was gonna step on some toes". Danny Gravelle was arrested with 314 kilograms of hashish in the tubing of his boat trailer while Denis Gravelle was arrested returning from Manitoulin island to Hamilton with some $20,000 worth of hashish. After Denis Gravelle was arrested, his lawyer approached Smith to tell him: "You're the one who ratted out Denis". Gilbank arranged for both Bill and Angie Smith to go into the witness protection later that day. At about 5:30 am on November 16, 1998, someone broke into Gilbank's home in Ancaster and executed her and her husband Fred with a shotgun.

=== Murder charges ===
Croitoru's most famous encounter with the law occurred on January 6, 2005, when he was charged with the Gilbank murders. Police suspected that the murders were in response to Lynn Gilbank's assistance in getting William and Angie Smith into a witness protection program after William Smith gave the police information about the Gravelle crime family. Croitoru, who had several contacts within the Gravelle family (including a contract to kill police inspector Rick Wills, who was investigating the Gravelles), was a suspect in the investigation and had his phones tapped during the investigation. While awaiting his murder trial, he ran a home renovation business until he was unable to secure a bank loan to cover business expenses. After closing the business he supported himself by working as a used car salesman. The police tried to trick Pat Musitano into naming Croitoru as the killer by starting a rumor that Paul Gravelle was accusing Musitano of being behind the murder of the Gilbanks, a ploy that did not work.

After an investigation that lasted six years and cost $6 million, police laid charges against Croitoru and Andre Gravelle. Croitoru was charged with two counts of first degree murder and two counts of conspiracy to commit murder. After spending seven months in prison, Croitoru was released on $100,000 bail. He was arrested on December 2, 2005, for violating his bail terms, and police filed another extortion charge against him.

Evidence against Croitoru and Gravelle was presented over the course of eight weeks in 2006, but the judge stated that the case against the two accused was not strong. A key witness for the Crown was a British immigrant and a professional lip-reader who had been paid $20,000 to decipher what Croitoru was saying in a videotape of him talking in a restaurant. During the trial, it was revealed that before she came to Canada, she had been convicted of perjury in her native Britain. Furthermore, it was revealed that she had overstated her abilities as a test showed that she was only able to decipher 55% of the words being spoken by people right in front of her. As a result, the judge in the trial excluded her as a witness and ordered the jury to disregard her testimony. Without the transcript provided by the lip reader of what Croitoru was alleged to be saying, the Crown's case was fatally weakened.

Ontario Attorney General Michael Bryant withdrew the charges on June 12, 2006. Following this action by the attorney general, both Croitoru and Andre Gravelle announced plans to file lawsuits against people involved with the prosecution. Gravelle sued for $25 million, and Croitoru sought $15 million for wrongful imprisonment and malicious prosecution. Hamilton Police Services was ordered to pay Gravelle $10,000 for court costs. In June 2006, Croitoru also pleaded guilty to the charges of extortion and violating the terms of his bail. As a result, he was forced to forfeit $10,000 of the bail money.

The children of the Gilbanks went on the W5 television show on March 10, 2007, to claim that there was serious police corruption that compromised the case against Gravelle and Croitoru. On the same show, the Hamilton police chief Brian Mullen was interviewed and denied that his force was corrupt. Bryant appeared on the same show to call the claims of the Gilbank children "false, baseless, scurrilous and potentially libelous and defamatory". Croitoru was asked to appear on the show, but he declined. Instead, Croitoru sent an email to the producers of W5 reading:

"I am suing for what happened to me so I cannot provide an interview for your program. I do want to say that what happened to me was very wrong. I did not have anything to do with the murder of Mr. and Mrs. Gilbank and do not know who did. It is wrong that after six years of investigation-they watched everything I did and wiretapped all my calls-after six years of investigating me, the police did not find any evidence I committed this crime-everything showed that I'm innocent, but they charged me with two murders I did not commit-I sat in jail for months when there was no case, no evidence that I was guilty. What happened to me was not right, it should not happen to anyone".

The case ruined the career of Inspector Rick Wills of the Hamilton police, who had once dined with Charles, the Prince of Wales during a royal visit to Canada as the outstanding representative of the Hamilton police. The police allege that André Gravelle had hired Croitoru to kill Wills, but Langton wrote that Wills had met with Gravelle and "...after talking with André, things cooled down". Wills promptly retired in August 2008 under a cloud of suspicion, but was ended up being charged in February 2009 for corruption for his actions during the Gravelle-Croitoru case as an investigation was opened into his handling of the case. Additionally, Wills was charged with stealing some $57,000 from the police evidence room. In 2010, Wills was found guilty of theft and was sentenced in 2011 to two years of house arrest. The eldest of the Gravelle brothers, Paul, had retired to Mexico. Gravelle told the media: "I've just gone out of it altogether now. I've retired. It's no secret, yes, I was a drug importer. Mostly hash oil and marijuana." When asked if he ordered Croitoru to kill the Gilbanks, Gravelle said: "No. That's not true. Our family is not killers...That's beyond us to do a thing like that. That's a despicable act. That's a cowardly act".

=== Life in Vancouver ===
Croitoru lived in Vancouver, British Columbia, with his common-law wife Tracy Edwards from 2007 onward. He most recently worked as a bodyguard for Lion's Gate Entertainment, providing protection for entertainers such as Jack Nicholson and Cyndi Lauper. He also had a brief acting career appearing in a movie titled Oklahoma Smugglers, in which he portrayed a wrestler, and in such television shows as Reaper.

Croitoru told the media that he loved Vancouver, saying: "It's beautiful out here, oh my God; the ocean, the mountains. Hamilton makes me puke now when I think about it; all those years wasted sitting there in that garbage, you know what I mean?" About his new profession as a bodyguard, he stated: "I love it! I dress up nice, eat the best food, just hang around and make sure nobody screws with these people". Croitoru stated that he was writing his autobiography, saying: "This will be a bestseller. I've been on every extreme in the world-the bikers, I was a wrestler, Major Junior A hockey player for the Kitchener Rangers-I've done a lot of things people can only dream about". Afterwards, Croitoru was reported to be looking for a ghostwriter to complete his autobiography.

Although he moved to Vancouver to get away from his underworld associates, he proved unable to resist the allure of the gangster subculture, and soon fell in with the United Nations gang active in the Fraser river valley. Police sources told the author Jerry Langton that Croitoru tried to join the Hells Angels' Vancouver chapter, but they directed him to the United Nations gang.

=== United Nations gang ===
In 2008-2009, there was a gang war for the control of the drug trade in the Lower Mainland of British Columbia. Clayton Roueche, the leader of the United Nations gang, had heard of Croitoru and recruited him. The police had tapped the phones of both Roueche and Croitoru, and often overheard them discussing cocaine deals. During his time on the Lower Mainland, Croitoru continued to use his Johnny K-9 pseudonym as his name.

Jonathan Barber was a young man who vaguely resembled Jonathan Bacon, one of the three Bacon brothers warring against the United Nations gang. On May 9, 2008, Barber—whose job was to install audio systems inside automobiles—was driving a Porsche Cayenne SUV owned by Bacon from Bacon's house in Abbotsford to his shop in Vancouver along the Kingsway highway when his vehicle was ambushed and shot up. The police allege that there was a group of United Nations members consisting of Croitoru, Dan Russell, Dilun Heng, Yong Lee, Barzan Tilli-Choli, and Karwan Saed who were also driving down the Kingsway and opened fire on Barber in the mistaken belief that he was Bacon. Barber's girlfriend, Vicky King, who was driving his car behind the SUV, was also injured, but she survived while he was killed.

On May 15, 2009, Croitoru was arrested, along with seven other members of the United Nations gang. They were charged with conspiracy to commit murder for allegedly plotting to kill the Bacon Brothers and other members of the Red Scorpions gang. Charged alongside Croitoru on charges of conspiracy to commit murder were United Nations leader Barzan Tilli-Choli (aged 26), Daniel Russell (aged 27), Karwan Saed (aged 32), Soroush Ansari (aged 28) Dilun Heng (aged 25), Young Sung (aged 27), and Aram Ali (aged 23); Croitoru at the age of 45 stood out in the group. On January 24, 2011, Croitoru was charged with first degree murder in connection with the execution of Jonathan Barber and the attempted murder of Barber's girlfriend Vicky King, then 17, in Burnaby on May 9, 2008. In July 2013, he pleaded guilty to conspiracy to commit murder, and the murder charges were stayed. He was sentenced to 13 years in prison, which was reduced to four years and eight months after factoring in time served.

=== Final years ===
In January 2015, he applied for parole, stating that he had agreed to help with the murders to impress members of the United Nations gang, but that he did not intend to kill anyone. The application was denied. The parole board in its report stated that he was "a man that engaged in a criminal lifestyle for over 20 years" with a "long history of negative associates and organized criminal activity that included violence was extremely concerning." The report concluded: "You appear comfortable using violence." On September 1, 2016, Croitoru was released to live in a halfway house in Toronto and was ordered not to have any contact with gangsters or criminals. Another parole condition was that he was not to enter Hamilton under any circumstances.

Croitoru lived at the Keele Community Correctional Centre in Toronto, which was the only halfway house in Canada that was willing to accept him. In his last years, Croitoru learned that the original spelling of his surname in Romania was Kroitoru, and started to use that spelling. Despite the withdrawal of the murder charges in 2006, the police saw Croitoru as the prime suspect in the murder of the Gilbanks, and continued to investigate him, much to his vexation. One outlaw biker who asked not to be named stated: "He just became a nobody. Lost all of his fame. Lost all of his clout...Nobody wants to end up in the Keele Centre. The type of guys who go there are guys who can't go anywhere else...He had seen his better days."

== Death ==
Croitoru died on February 21, 2017, at a federal halfway house in Toronto at the age of 53. Besides his widow, he left behind three children. His widow, Tracy, maintained that he was not a killer, saying the murder accusations had "ruined our life".

One of his underworld associates who asked not to be named told Humphreys in 2017: "Wow that's really too bad. I didn't like the guy, but damn. He definitely was notorious. Johnny was not the most pleasant person but he fought for his beliefs. Had a passion for riding and the biker lifestyle. He was a bulldozer." Just days after his death, Jim Cornette and Brian Last discussed Croitoru on The Jim Cornette Experience podcast. Last stated: "Despite blowing up the police station and allegedly murdering people, he was very nice to me!" Cornette stated: "He was two different people. There was no happier guy in the locker room. A smile on his face every time you saw him and totally dedicated to the wrestling business." Last's comments were said sarcastically about people eulogizing him fondly and Cornette's comments were based on his friendship with Croitoru while also noting that he had difficulty reconciling Croitoru's double life.

== Championships and accomplishments ==
- American Wrestling Association
  - AWA Southern Heavyweight Championship (1 time)
- Border City Wrestling
  - BCW Can-Am Heavyweight Championship (1 time)
- International Championship Wrestling (Cambridge, Ontario)
  - ICW Heavyweight Championship (1 time)
- Midwest Territorial Wrestling
  - MTW Heavyweight Championship (1 time)
- Smoky Mountain Wrestling
  - SMW Beat the Champ Television Championship (1 time)

== Books ==
- Edwards, Peter (2013). Unrepentant The Strange and (Sometimes) Terrible Life of Lorne Campbell, Satan's Choice and Hells Angels Biker. Toronto: Vintage Canada. ISBN 9780307362575.
- Kayser, Tracy (2021). Johnny K9: My life with the pro wrestler turned serious gangster. Chicago, Illinois: Crime Book Services. ISBN 979-8-483-94131-6.
- Legall, Paul (January 11, 2005). "Croitoru revelled in 'bad guy' image". The Hamilton Spectator. pp. B1–B2.
- Langton, Jerry (2010). Showdown: How the Outlaws, Hells Angels and Cops Fought for Control of the Streets. Toronto: John Wiley & Sons. ISBN 978-0-470-67878-7.
- Langton, Jerry (2015). Cold War How Organized Crime Works in Canada and Why It's About to Get More Violent. Toronto: HarperColllins. ISBN 978-1-4434-3255-9.
- Langton, Jerry (2013). The Notorious Bacon Brothers Inside Gang Warfare on Vancouver Streets. Toronto: John Wiley & Sons. ISBN 978-1-118-40459-1.
