= Clayton Roueche =

Canadian crime boss (born 1975)

Clayton Franklin Roueche
- Born: 31 May 1975 (age 51); Chilliwack, British Columbia, Canada
- Other name: "Clay"
- Years active: 1994–
- Known for: Leader of the United Nations gang
- Successor: Barzan Tilli-Choli
- Allegiance: United Nations gang
- Conviction: Conspiracy to traffic in narcotics (2009)
- Penalty: 30 years' imprisonment

Clayton "Clay" Franklin Roueche (born May 31, 1975) is a Canadian gangster best known for founding the United Nations gang of Vancouver.

== Early life ==
Roueche was born into an upper-middle-class family in Chilliwack. His family owned a scrapyard and recycling business that made a profit of $1 million per annum. Roueche grew up surrounded by Vietnamese Canadians and Laotian Canadians. He came to develop an Asian fetish as he was described as spending much of his time in Abbotsford's Vietnamtown where he loved: "...the fortunetellers he'd find there, grainy bootlegged kung-fu movies and Vietnamese girls". A Korean Canadian said of him: "Clay was never white. Maybe he was born white, but his soul was never white." Roueche loved karate and his childhood hero was Bruce Lee. Roueche's sister, Sherry, stated: "Clay was a popular guy growing up. But he didn't have any big plans to, like, take over the world or anything."

As a high school student, Roueche frequently used drugs. He was described as a rambunctious and adventuresome youth who loved camping by the Fraser River and underage drinking in local bars, which he entered with false identity cards. Roueche did not wish to follow his father into the scrap business as his father recalled: "If we went out to eat after work, he'd sometimes refuse to get out of the car, because he wouldn't go into a restaurant looking dirty". After Roueche graduated from high school in 1993, he chose not to go to university, and instead worked at a variety of sales jobs in the Fraser river valley. He was first arrested in 1994 after he was seen visiting the home of a drug dealer, but was not charged. Roueche opened up a restaurant, which failed. In 1997, Roueche met James Coulter, who became his best friend. Roueche had connections through his Lao Canadian girlfriend with various Asian organized crime figures in Vancouver, and soon began to sell drugs to Coutler and his friends.

Roueche began to work for a Vietnamese organized crime figure known as Vu. Roueche came to see Vu as a surrogate father, saying in 2013: "He was the type of guy who did what he said he'd do, and I respected that. He wasn't a paper tiger." Roueche saw Vu as his dai lo (Cantonese for "big brother"). Vu introduced Roueche to Buddhism. Roueche came to be fascinated by the Japanese concept of kaizen (continual improvement), and under the influence of Buddhism believed he was a reincarnated samurai. Roueche began to sell drugs for Vu, which made him a profit of about $1,000 per day. Roueche was typical of the gangsters in the Lower Mainland in coming from a middle-class family with loving parents, which was not the norm in the rest of Canada where the gangsters tended to come from working-class families and broken homes.

== Drug dealer ==
The organized crime scene in the Lower Mainland was dominated by the Hells Angels, who had a whites only admission policy, and engaged in monopolistic practices that led to high prices for illegal drugs. Roueche and Coulter founded a multi-cultural gang in opposition to the Hells Angels. The United Nations gang was founded on May 25, 1997. The name United Nations was coined at a party hosted by Roueche in Richmond when somebody commented upon the racially diverse crowd by saying: "What the fuck is this, a United Nations meeting?" Roueche was greatly influenced by Eastern mysticism and chose as the slogan for his gang "Honor, Loyalty, Respect", which all members were expected to have tattooed on their bodies, usually in Chinese characters. Likewise, he expected members to wear hoodies covered with Asian imagery such as tigers and Chinese dragons; to learn and practice mixed martial arts; and to engage in rituals he devised based upon Shinto and Buddhist rituals he had read about.

Roueche discovered that the Kootenays region was where most of the marijuana in British Columbia was grown and starting in 1997 began to export marijuana to the United States. The B.C. Bud was very popular in the United States, becoming the United Nations gang's principal source of revenue. Roueche made an offer to the best growers of marijuana in the Kootenays, offering to pay generously even if the crop was seized by the police or ruined by an early frost, provided the growers sold exclusive to him. Roueche came to be the most successful and wealthiest marijuana dealer in British Columbia. Roueche opened up grow-ops all over Abbotsford to grow marijuana. Roueche stated: "The weed business touched everyone in Abbotsford. We'd get schoolteachers, old ladies, college kids. I was allergic to the shit—my face would blow up like fucking Garfield—so I couldn't really be around it much. But I'd come around every once in a while just to check in." In turn, Roueche used his profits to purchase cocaine from Mexico to smuggle into Canada. A Lebanese UN gang member, Ahmed "Lou" Kaawach, whom Roueche described as "wannabe ladies man" and a terrible rapper, was deported back to Lebanon, where Roueche visited him several times. As Kaawach could not return to Canada, Roueche send him to live in Guadalajara, where he served as his liaison with the Sinaloa Cartel, working out deals to exchange the prized B.C. Bud for cocaine. Kaawach was murdered in Guadalajara alongside another UN gang member, the Guatemalan-born Elliot "Taco" Castañeda on 12 July 2008.

Roueche became the principal player in smuggling marijuana into the United States, smuggling about 20 tons of marijuana per annum usually by helicopter, making a profit of about $120 million U.S. dollars. Peter Ostrovsky of the ICE stated: "In 1997, a big B.C. Bud load was 15 pounds, then it went to a hundred pounds But once they started flying it across in helicopters, it jumped to multihundred-pound loads. They were flying million-, million-and-a-half-dollar loads. The goal became to move as much weight across the border as possible. There were other groups that did helicopters too, but nobody did it to the extent Roueche did." The journalist Ian Mulgrew stated: "There's no doubt Clay Roueche changed Vancouver. Before, it was this hippie-dippie place. But the level of violence and the way people started to look at drugs and policing changed. He ushered in a new era...Clay was a product of his time. You've got to understand, California growers had the same level of sophistication, but no one was doing it on the same scale as B.C. When he was coming up, the weed business was bigger than agriculture, bigger than mining. He rode the crest of that." Roueche avoided the rigid hierarchy of the Mafia, instead having a more informal approach, saying "It's not like all these people they say who were in the UN worked for me. They might have worked with me, but that's different." Roueche normally woke at about 5 pm, and spent his nights visiting various nightclubs and strip clubs all over the Lower Mainland.

In 1998, Roueche moved into a house in Abbotsford with his girlfriend. His neighbor, Richard Shatto, noted that Roueche was the only non-Asian living in the house and that he just "floated in and out" as he did not consistently live in the house. Shatto described the Roueche household as one of constant hedonism as Roueche and his girlfriend engaged in riotous bacchanalian excess at their parties. Shatto complained the debauchery at his neighbor's house as drinking, drug use and sex in the backyard were regular nocturnal occurrences at the Roueche household. Shatto called Roueche an unpleasant neighbor owing to the loud music that was played well into the night. Shatto described people continually going in to and coming out of the house and that: "They wore black and white with white bandannas. When they going out to a club or a party, they always wore black or white fedoras". Roueche once had a trailer parked in the front lawn and at 1 am ended a party by shouting "Let's go!" Roueche and all of his guests then lined up single file to start taking items out of the trailer, which led Shatto to call the police as he stated: "If you come right now, you can catch them in the act". The police never responded to this call nor any of the others that Shatto made about Roueche. In 2001, Roueche sold the house to leave Abbotsford.

== Gang boss ==
Roueche was the object of an assassination attempt, being shot at while eating at a restaurant. Roueche believed he survived because of the Buddhist prayer beads he had with him at the time, inspiring him to convert to Buddhism. Roueche crafted for himself a philosophy based upon the various Asian martial arts films he had seen. Roueche stated: "I wanted to be the biggest drug dealer in Canada. I wanted to make history." On trips to Hong Kong and Vietnam, Roueche visited ancient temples and Buddhist monasteries, looking for inspiration. With his new wealth, Roueche married his long-time Lao-Canadian common-law wife in 2001 and purchased an expensive house. Roueche opened up a new restaurant called the Millennium Cafe and purchased real estate all over the Fraser river valley. Roueche stated: "I was in this for the long haul. I didn't want to be one of those guys who makes a bunch of money and blows through it all in a couple of years." Roueche came to be a surrogate father for his gang, recalling: "I had girls I didn't know calling me because their fucking boyfriends were abusive, all that kind of shit. I had to deal with it, and it would get under my skin. It was fucking exhausting." Roueche purchased a gym, which he turned into a training center for aspirating mixed martial arts (MMA) fighters and frequently attended MMA fights in the Vancouver area. He not only watched MMA fights, but Roueche also worked as an amateur MMA fighter himself. Roueche was described by the American journalist Jesse Hyde as a muscular man with his body covered with elaborate Asian-themed tattoos who somewhat incongruously wore glasses.

Roueche adopted his wife's daughter by a previous marriage and fathered two more daughters. Fatherhood led Roueche to tone down his hedonist lifestyle as he spent his weekends with his family. Roueche's marriage came to be a strained one as his wife flew into rages over various issues. Roueche came to be involved in a feud with the Bacon brothers for the control of the drug trade. Roueche had little respect for the brothers, saying: "To me they were just little errand boys." Roueche was forced to tighten discipline, admitting that he ordered the beatings of errant members, through he claimed not to enjoy it. In 2004, a police informer Michael Plante while wearing a wire recorded a Hells Angel, Johnny Punko, saying that another Hells Angel, Gino Zumpano, the president of the Angels East End Vancouver chapter, "took a walk" with Roueche, which Plante understood to mean that an important meeting had taken place. Plante also recorded Punko as saying that Roueche had hired David Giles, a "full patch" member of the Angels East End chapter, to work as a debt collector by beating up two drug dealers who were in arrears to him.

In late 2005, Roueche spoke with a police informer, Ken Davis, about his plans to have Davis take US$500,000 to California to buy 25 kilograms of cocaine to smuggle into Canada. Roueche also spoke about his wish to have Davis recruit some street level drug dealers in San Jose to work for the UN gang. Roueche further wanted Davis to recruit American truck drivers to sell ecstasy and B.C. Bud marijuana in Texas, saying he found some clients in the Lone Star State. Finally, he spoke about a new method of smuggling drugs into the United States, saying he envisioned "something a little different, a little cool" that was "flatter" and "deeper", by which he apparently meant a digging a tunnel under the border. In early 2006, Davis took two trips to Los Angeles, bringing US$109,555 in the first trip and the US$118,980 in the second trip. Roueche was unhappy with Davis, saying he was taking too long to go to Los Angeles and that if he did not move faster on his next trip, he would send down some thugs to Seattle to beat Davis up.

Starting in 2006, Roueche often met Troy Tran, Billy Ly and Mark Kim of the Fresh Off The Boat Killers gang of Calgary. Detective Andrew Wooding of the Abbotsford police stated: "It became clear from our surveillance that these guys were actually working with Roueche and taking direction from Roueche. At the time, we believed the FK were adopted by the UN and they were benefiting by getting better access to cocaine through the UN supply lines and the UN were bringing that sort of oversight and organization and the threat of a larger group that are looking after you." When Kim was murdered in 2007, Roueche attended his funeral in Calgary."

In 2007, Roueche's wife filed for divorce. In October 2007, Roueche was convicted of assault after he beat another man at a party. Sometime in late 2007 or early 2008, Roueche recruited Ly and Tran of the Fresh Off the Boat Killers to come to the Lower Mainland to kill the Bacon brothers. Roueche called Tran and Ly the "C-town guys" in a phone call that the police recorded, going on to say: "The C-town guys, they're fucking anywhere, anytime. Boom, boom, boom"."

Police wiretaps of Roueche's phone calls in 2007 and 2008 showed he lived by a set of rules, saying in a phone call that UN gang members must never have sex with another gang member's wife; must never eat "dog, cat or snake"; must never "let anyone touch your head"; and must never walk under a clothesline as he stated "All those things take away the power". The police in the United States started an investigation of Roueche code-named Project Frozen Timber. Police wire-tapes showed that Roueche was notably unwilling to travel to the United States as he stated in a wire-tapped phone call to a friend, Pam Lee, that: "I'll never come back. I wouldn't even get down there; they'd throw me in jail". Roueche's passport showed that he frequently visited Vietnam, Japan, the Netherlands, the United Arab Emirates, Mexico, Lebanon, Thailand, Macao and Hong Kong, but most notably he never visited the United States.

== Arrest and conviction ==
In May 2008, Roueche went to Mexico to attend a wedding. On May 19, 2008, Roeche landed in Mexico and was refused admission, causing him to take the next flight to Vancouver. At the request of the American authorities, the flight was diverted to Dallas, where the U.S. Customs arrested Roueche upon landing. Roueche was charged with conspiracy to import cocaine and marijuana into the United States and was denied bail. After his arrest, Roueche was replaced as UN gang leader by an Iraqi immigrant, Barzan Tilli-Choli. The RCMP performed a search of Roueche's house and found what they called "a kit for kidnapping or murder" that comprised handcuffs, masks, night-vision goggles, bulletproof vests and a handgun. In what was described as a "bold move" designed to discredit the claims of the prosecution that he was a millionaire, Roueche claimed to be unable to afford an attorney and asked for a public defender to represent him.

In April 2009, Roueche pled guilty to the charges. On December 15, 2009, Roueche was sentenced in Seattle to 30 years in prison. According to the Bureau of Prisons inmate locater, "Clay Roueche" is currently serving his sentence at FCI Edgefield in Edgefield, South Carolina, and is due to be released on November 25, 2027. In May 2010, Roueche attracted media attention when it was learned that he was using his Facebook profile to sell his artwork as he took to painting Asian-themed paintings in his prison cell, which he sold for a premium on the internet. Roueche has made further attempts at getting his sentence reduced or to be released early.

== Books ==
- Langton, Jerry (2010). Showdown: How the Outlaws, Hells Angels and Cops Fought for Control of the Streets. Toronto: John Wiley & Sons. ISBN 978-0470678787.
- Langton, Jerry (2013). The Notorious Bacon Brothers Inside Gang Warfare on Vancouver Streets. Toronto: John Wiley and Sons. ISBN 9781118404577.
