= Gurmit Singh Dhak =

Canadian gangster (1978-2010)

- Born: 8 September 1978; Vancouver, British Columbia, Canada
- Died: 16 October 2010 (aged 32); Burnaby, British Columbia, Canada
- Cause of death: Gunshot wounds
- Occupation: Crime boss
- Allegiance: Dhak-Duhre group

Gurmit Singh Dhak (8 September 1978 – 16 October 2010) was a Canadian gangster who served as the co-boss of the Dhak-Duhre group in Vancouver.

== Gangster ==
Dhak was born in and grew up on the West Side Dunbar area of Vancouver. His parents were Indian immigrants from the Punjab who ran a laundromat. Dhak had become a gangster in grade 8 when he had been greatly impressed by Raymond "Ray" Man Yen Chan of the Lotus gang. Chan owned a red Porsche Carrera and recruited Dhak to work for him as a drug dealer, promising that he would have his choice of girlfriends and a luxury sports car like his own if he worked for him. Dhak proved to be a successful drug dealer and by the time he was in high school, he owned the luxury automobile of his dreams and made enough money to buy his parents a house in Surrey. Dhak also found that as Chan promised him that being a gangster had him very attractive to women. Constable Douglas Spencer of the Vancouver Police Department described Dhak: "He was never disrespectful. He would shoot the breeze...You couldn't imagine that he was a stone-cold killer. Huge drug dealer". Spencer told Kim Bolan, the crime correspondent of The Vancouver Sun newspaper: "His attitude was make money, not war. He was old school. He was well-respected. He didn’t cross people. He just wanted to make money. He was an anomaly, really. None of them are like that now."

In February 1999, Dhak assisted with helping one of his associates kill a 19-year-old rival, Doan Minh Vu. Dhak lowered his window of the car to allow the shooter to open fire. Kenny Cuong Manh Nguyen, the man who killed Vu outside of Madison’s nightclub in Vancouver was convicted of second-degree murder. As part of the investigation of the incident, the police found that Dhak had in his possession a gun that had been used in a gang-related shooting in December 1998. In April 2003, Dhak was convicted in a plea bargain of manslaughter for Vu's killing and was sentenced to 7 years in prison.

In May 2003, Chan was murdered, being found shot dead in an industrial park in Richmond. Chan's murder came as a great shock to Dhak and brought home to him the dangers of the gangster lifestyle. While in prison, Dhak contacted Spencer who remembered: "He told me to go talk to his little brother. He tried to get his brother out of it. He said, 'I'm in too far. I have too enemies'". Dhak was released on parole in 2004. After his release, Spencer met him to warn that a hit squad from Mara Salvatrucha had arrived in Vancouver with the aim of killing him. Dhak told Spencer: "I know. Thanks for telling me, Doug. They've been here for two weeks".

In 2005, Dhak's Lexus SUV was shot up in front of the Uranus Lounge strip-club on East Broadway in Vancouver. Dhak refused to answer any questions about the shooting and was arrested after he threatened to kill one of the investigating officers. On 8 September 2007, while celebrating a birthday party at the posh Quattro on Fourth restaurant in Kitsilano, two masked gunmen marched up to the window and opened fire at the table where Dhak was sitting. Both Dhak and his 21-year-old girlfriend were wounded in the shooting and had to be taken to the hospital. As usual, Dhak refused to answer any questions from the police about the shooting in Kitsilano. Dhak allied himself with the Duhre brothers to form the Dhak-Duhre organization. The three Duhre brothers were Sandip "Dip" Singh Duhre, Balraj Singh Duhre and Paul Singh Duhre. The Duhre brothers had once been part of the Punjabi mafia and worked for Bindy Johal in the 1990s.

== Turn against gangsterism ==
In his last year of his life, Dhak turned against the gangster lifestyle. Dhak contacted the Odd Squad (the youth engagement unit) of the Royal Canadian Mounted Police about making an anti-gang video for high school students. In a video made in June 2010, Dhak stated the swaggering, macho aggression of the gangsters hid a deep insecurity as he stated that to live the life of a gangster was to live in fear, never knowing when someone would try to kill him and never knowing who to trust. Dhak stated: "...if I could turn back time, I would never do it again. Every day I've got to look over my shoulder; I've got to worry about my family, I've got to worry about, like, if I jump out of my car, am I going to get shot? Or, you know, I could be walking in the mall and walking out and getting shot. I don't know...Oh, I want to get out. But it's too late now to get out. I have too many enemies". Dhak stated: "Deep down inside you are scared. You have got to think every day when you wake up in the morning, 'is this going to be my last day that I am living?'" Dhak ended the video by pleading for high school students not to join gangs, warning that no-one would want to live his lifestyle.

== Murder ==
On 16 October 2010, Dhak's prescience about his imminent demise was proved correct when he was murdered with his corpse being found in his BMW automobile in the parking lot of the Metrotown Mall in Burnaby. The cause of Dhak's death was being shot in the face. Bolan wrote in 2018: "Dhak’s execution was the flashpoint for a near decade-long war that has raged across the province and left many dead and wounded in its wake. Few of those behind the violence have been held to account."

Suhhveer "Sukh" Dhak, the younger brother of Gurmit, believed that the Wolfpack Alliance gang and that two Wolfpack leaders Larry Amero and Jonathan Bacon in particular were the ones responsible for his brother's murder. At about 2:45 pm on 14 August 2011, a white Porsche Cayenne carrying six people was leaving the parking lot of the Delta Grand Hotel in Kelowna, when a group of four masked gunmen carrying AK-47 assault rifles opened fire. The gunmen fired at least 30 shots into the Cayenne, killing Jonathan Bacon, wounding Amero, and leaving a 21-year waitress, Leah Hadden-Watts, a quadriplegic as she took a bullet straight through her neck, severing her spinal cord. On 19 November 2012, Suhhveer "Sukh" Dhak and his bodyguard Thomas Mantel were murdered in Vancouver. Since 29 June 2021, Amero and another Wolfpack leader Rabih "Robby" Alkhalil have been on trial in Vancouver for the murders of Sandip Duhre and Suhhveer Dhak with the Crown alleging the two hired the hitman Dean Michael Wiwchar to kill Dhak and Duhre.

== Books ==
- Edwards, Peter; Nájera, Luis (2021). The Wolfpack The Millennial Mobsters Who Brought Chaos and the Cartels to the Canadian Underworl. Toronto: Random House of Canada. ISBN 9780735275409.
- Langton, Jerry (2013). The Notorious Bacon Brothers : inside gang warfare on Vancouver streets. Etobicoke, Ont.: J. Wiley and Sons Canada. ISBN 978-1118388679.
