= Alkhalil family =

Canadian family

- Years active: 1990 - present
- Territory: Surrey, British Columbia, Canada
- Ethnicity: Palestinians
- Membership: 30 members
- Criminal activities: drug trafficking
- Allies: Independent Soldiers
- Rivals: Hell Angels, Punjabi mafia

The Alkhalil family (also spelled as al-Khalil) is a Palestinian Canadian family of gangsters.

== Origins ==
The Alkhalil family were Palestinians from the Palestine who fled to Lebanon during the First Arab–Israeli War of 1948 and 1949. The First Arab–Israeli War is known as al-Nakba ("the catastrophe") to the Palestinians. The family moved from their refugee camp in Lebanon to Saudi Arabia in search of work, but in common with all Palestinian refugees were denied the right to be Saudi citizens, even if born in Saudi Arabia, which made the Alkhalil family stateless. It is the position of the Kingdom of Saudi Arabia that all Palestinians, even those born within its borders, are citizens of a yet to be created Palestinian state. The five Alkhalil brothers, who were all born in Saudi Arabia, were Nabil (1976–2018), Khalil (1981–2001), Hisham "Terry" (born 1982), Mahmoud (1984–2003) and Rabih "Robby" (born 8 May 1987).

On 12 December 1990, the Alkhalil family immigrated to Canada as refugees with their refugee application saying they wanted "to escape the Gulf War and the lack of educational resources available to their children" in Saudi Arabia. The family settled in Surrey, British Columbia. A long-standing feud with the three Duhre brothers started at the beginning of the century. In May 2000, Nabil Alkhalil stabbed a Duhre gang member in Holly Park in Surrey. The three Duhre brothers were Sandip "Dip" Duhre, Balraj Duhre and Paul Duhre. The Duhre brothers had once been part of the Punjabi mafia and worked alongside Bindy Johal in the 1990s.

== Family members ==
=== Khalil ===
The first Alkhalil brother to be murdered was the 19 year-old Khalil, who was found dead on 18 January 2001 with six bullets in his body at the entranceway to a Surrey apartment. Khalil Alkhalil had, by the age of 19, already amassed convictions for willful obstruction of a peace officer, possession of a dangerous weapon, assault, uttering death threats and assaulting a peace officer. Martin Naud, the 20 year-old automobile mechanic's apprentice and a drug dealer who killed Khalil was shot in the hand by Khalil, and despite his claims of self-defense was charged with second-degree murder. Naud stated that Khalil was attempting to rob him of the drugs he had with him that were worth about $200.

On 3 February 2001, when Naud posted bail, about 30 members of the Alkhalil family arrived in the courtroom in New Westminster to threaten and bully the Naud family. One of the Alkhalil womenfolk told a female friend of Naud: "You scared, bitch? You better be!" When Naud was granted bail, the Alkhalil family screamed abuse at the Crown Attorney and the judge. As Naud and company left the courtroom, the Alkhalil family started to chant in Arabic "Khalil's not dead!" and "One Alkhalil is dead, but there are still hundreds of Alkhalils and you'll have to face us!" While attempting to leave the courtroom, Philip Rankin, the lawyer for Naud, was punched in the face by Mahmoud Alkhalil, causing him to suffer a broken tooth.

In the months that followed, the Naud family were the victims of a campaign of harassment with shots being fired into their house, a machete being left on their front lawn, and leaflets appearing in their neighborhood calling Naud a murderer. Naud's mother left British Columbia to escape the harassment. Rankin was also the victim of harassment, being beaten-up several times by Mahmoud Alkhalil. At Naud's trial, he testified that Khalil Alkhalil had tried to rob him and in the ensuring struggle he was able to wrestle his gun away from him, which he then used to kill him. On 7 November 2002, Naud was acquitted with the jury ruling he acted in self-defense. On 11 April 2003, Raymond Naud, the father of Martin, was shot and wounded inside his own house. On 5 July 2004, Martin Naud was murdered in Kelowna by an unknown gunman who executed him as he was getting out of his automobile.

Naud was working as a drug dealer for the Dhak-Duhre group, and the killing of Khalil started a feud. Superintendent Mike Porteous of the Vancouver Police Department stated in 2018: "It started as a dispute over drug trafficking lines in Surrey way back in the day. But it became much more personal with the murder of Khalil. They've been involved in a conflict with the Duhre guys for a good 20 years and it kind of ebbed and flowed relative to different murders and struggles over drug territory". In July 2002, Nabil Alkhalil was found with a handgun in his possession, which caused his parole to be revoked. Parole documents from 2002 stated: "Alkhalil told police that he thought his life was in danger. He said he believes that the Duhre brothers have a contract on his head. The Duhre brothers were involved in the incident that resulted in the death of one of (Nabil) Alkhalil's brothers. Alkhalil retaliated at the time by beating up one of the Duhres. There has been bad blood since. The Duhre brothers are considered by police to be violent as are Alkhalil and his brother Mahmoud".

=== Mahmoud ===
Mahmoud Alkhalil was a member of the Independent Soldiers street gang. On 16 August 2003, he was shot during a shoot-out with the Hells Angels on the dance floor of the Loft Six nightclub in Gastown. Mahmoud was able to make his way out of Loft Six to his automobile, drove a few blocks, and died of massive blood loss caused by his wounds a few minutes later. Mahmoud was 19 years old at the time of his murder. Sandip "Dip" Duhre was present in Loft Six at the time of the shoot-out. Despite the fact that it was the Hells Angels who killed Mahmound, the Alkhalil family blamed Duhre for his murder.

=== Nabil ===
Nabil Alkhalil relocated to Ottawa, where he remained active in organised crime. On 1 May 2005, he was involved in a lengthy high-speed chase down the highway and roads of eastern Ontario as he attempted to elude the police in his white Cadillac Deville automobile, running his car at speeds of more than 210 kilometers per hour over 32 kilometers. When Alkhalil was finally arrested outside of Cornwall after having abandoned his car, he was found to be carrying a duffle bag with 11 kilograms of cocaine in it. At his trial, Justice Hugh McLean noted that Alkhalil was already under a deportation order to send him back to Saudi Arabia owing to his lengthy criminal record, but instead sentenced him to prison for possession of narcotics with the intention of trafficking, dangerous driving and failing to stop for the police.

He remained in Canada despite the deportation order following his release from prison. Alkhalil visited the Lebanese embassy in Ottawa several times in an unsuccessful attempt to have a Lebanese passport issued in his name. In November 2010, Alkhalil disappeared from Canada following warnings that rival gangsters wanted him dead. His parents, Hossein Alkhalil and Soumayya Azzam, lost the $170,000 in bail they posted for Nabil.

In 2013, Nabil Alkhalil went to Mexico on a forged Canadian passport. He worked at a used car dealership in Ciudad López Mateos while continuing to be active in organised crime. Nabil Alkhalil is believed to have served as the Alkhalil family's liaison with the Sinaloa Cartel. On 6 November 2013, Alkhalil phoned his mother in Surrey to say he was "somewhere in the Middle East". In 2015, he was arrested in Colombia when the airport officials at the Bogotá airport discovered he had arrived with a forged Canadian passport. He was sent to Panama City and again vanished. On 24 August 2018, Nabil was involved in a money dispute with a wealthy Ciudad López Mateos businessman, Javier Armando Nuñez, which entailed much shouting on both sides and which ended Alkhalil being shot dead with a 9mm handgun. The State of Mexico state police charged Nuñez's bodyguard, José Mario Venegas González, with the murder. Hossein Alkhalil and Soumayya Azzam have argued in newspaper interviews that Venegas was the "fall guy" and the real killer was Armando as no gunpower residue was found on Venegas's hands after his arrest while the police never inspected Armando's hands for gunpower residue.

=== Hisham ===
On 30 January 2014, Hisham "Terry" Alkhalil was arrested in Ottawa and charged with conspiracy to traffic in cocaine. As part of the Project Anarchy raids, the police seized 54 pounds of cocaine with a street value of $12 million. The Ottawa police also seized Hisham's lavish house on Rossland Avenue worth $1.1 million as the proceeds of crime. On 14 January 2016, the Ottawa police seized the Abu Abed Café owned by Hisham as the proceeds of crime. Mike Laviolette of the Ottawa police who worked on the Project Anarchy case said of the family: "They were very active, not just on a local and national level, but an international level as well which demonstrated their ability to just be as mobile as they wanted to be...It was the propensity for violence — the potential for them being violent, or people who wanted them dead being violent, in our city. We disrupted them enough that we were able to prevent any type of large-scale violence within our city." In 2018, the Project Anarchy charges against Hisham were stayed when a judge ruled that the Crown had taken too long to bring the case to trial.

=== Rabih ===
Rabih "Robby" Alkhalil relocated to Montreal, where he rented an expensive penthouse condominium at 555 René Lévesque Boulevard West with a stunning view of the St. Lawrence river. Alkhalil was the leader of the Wolfpack Alliance alongside Larry Amero. Montreal is regarded as the most important city in the Canadian underworld as it is a major port city with ocean access, well connected via highways to other cities, and is only 332 miles from New York City, the biggest and richest drug market in North America. Ever since the Prohibition era, there has been a well developed smuggling route running south from Montreal to New York. Both Alkhalil and Amero were interested in seizing control of the Montreal underworld as a stepping stone to entering the New York drug market. Alkhalil employed a hitman, Dean Michael Wiwchar, whom he called "my best hitter". Together with the other members of the Wolfpack Alliance, Alkhalil used encrypted texts on the Pretty Good Privacy system to communicate, and like the other Wolfpack members, he often frankly wrote about murders. The Wolfpack worked as distributors of cocaine from the Sinaloa Cartel of Mexico, whose leader was Joaquín Guzmán, better known by his moniker El Chapo ("the shorty"). A key member of the Wolfpack was Shane Kenneth Maloney of the West End Gang which controls the Port of Montreal.

Alkhalil opened an haute couture shop in Old Montreal and shared his condo with Larry Amero of the Hells Angels White Rock chapter. The Canadian journalist Peter Edwards and the Mexican journalist Luis Nájera wrote Amero and Alkhalil "...tightened up their own connections with Mexican cocaine suppliers" during their time in Montreal. Edwards and Nájera wrote that Alkhalil and Amero were in charge of a smuggling operation to bring in cocaine from via secret compartments in trucks from the United States. The Wolfpack Alliance were reported to have smuggled in about 400 kilograms of cocaine per month.

On 17 January 2012, Sandip "Dippy" Duhre, the co-boss of the Dhak-Duhre group, was shot dead while leaving the Sheraton Wall Centre in Vancouver. Dean Michael Wiwchar was charged with killing Duhre with the Crown alleging he was a hitman for the Wolfpack. Together with his fellow Wolfpack members Nick Nero, Martino "Lil Guy" Caputo, and Johnny Raposo, Alkhalil was involved in the spring of 2012 in a deal to bring in 200 kilograms of cocaine worth $5 million from Mexico into Canada via Chicago with the profits to be split equally between the four men. Alkhalil, Nero and Caputo decided to kill Raposo to take his share of the profits for themselves. On 28 April 2012, Nero texted Alkhalil: "We split the load 3 ways. Me u [you] lil guy [Caputo]. The only thing is once we pick them up, we have to get him [Raposo] he is the biggest rat in the world. I told him don't tell anyone I'm doing this for you but the retard can't help his bigmouth".

On 5 May 2012, Alkhalil texted his fellow Wolfpack member Nick Nero: "I'm free now. Barried [buried] 2 guys up north lol. What a week". On 17 May 2012, Alkhalil responded to a text from Nero that questioned the quality of his cocaine by writing: "Ur [your] guys keep accusing my end of stealing and lying. I don't like it. I would never steal. Not even 100 dollars, and my workers know I'd kill their families for doing the same". On 21 May 2012, Alkhalil ordered Wiwchar via a text to kill Raposo with a promise to pay him $100,000 in cash. In response, Wiwchar texted Alkhalil later on the afternoon of the same day: "Ice cream boy [Raposo] is getting it[.] k. ya I'm flying there anyway so ill [I'll] bang that one off for ya np [no problem][.] u [you] can have the gat [gun] brought to me in dot [Toronto]? And the pic? Also can u make sure it is a 45 and or 40 cal [calibre]? And I will get the ride[.] College Street is heatey [hot, i.e. difficult to operate on] but if I get em [them] inside the shop its ok no noise why are we killing ice cream people? LOL!" Raposo was fond of ice cream, and was usually referred to in the Wolfpack texts as "ice cream boy".

On 23 May 2012, Nero was arrested in St. Catharines, Ontario on charges of trafficking in cocaine and the police seized $1,155,000 in cash from his Toronto condo. The police also arrested Nero's fiancée Tawnya Del Ben Fletcher at her Niagara-on-the-Lake condo. Nero left the password "sharp0" and email address "Cervezafrya@encryptroid.com" for the Pretty Good Privacy network on a yellow sticky note on the kitchen countertop in his Niagara-on-the-Lake condo, which allowed the police to decrypt all of the texts relating to the coming Raposo murder.

In one text to Alkhalil on 29 May 2012, Wiwchar wrote about his desire to have his girlfriend work as a hitwoman, writing: "I like gangster girls who kill[.] that's just what I need[.] I could train her to work with me[.] we could be a team[.] thjink [think] how usefull [useful] a hot girl who dumps people could be[.]why is she a scumbag? She is a snake chick, eh?" Alkhalil texted back: "She goes after guys who r [are] loaded beyonf [beyond] anything u [you] or I have see and uses them to her advantage. I stay away from her. Lol. She owes me 400k. She might bang u and convince u to dump me." On 30 May 2012, Alkhalil texted Amero: "They [the police] got 10 cars tailing Zelda [Wiwchar] in dot [Toronto]. Something is up". Amero replied: "Not good wonder why". Amero advised Alkhalil to cancel the murder, but Alkhalil refused.

On 18 June 2012, Wiwchar killed Raposo at the Sicilian Sidewalk Café in Little Italy while watching a Euro Cup soccer match. Wiwchar walked into the Sicilian Sidewalk Café disguised as a construction worker and wearing a dust mask and a blonde wig. While the football fan Raposo closely followed the Ireland vs. Italy football match on the café's television, Wiwchar walked up to him and shot him in the head and neck from behind. After the murder, Alkhalil texted Wiwchar later the same day: "Time we put u [you] in sniper school I think. this seems too easy for u". On 21 June 2012, Wiwchar was arrested in Toronto. When told by a police constable that he was under arrest for first-degree murder, Wiwchar asked "which one?" Alkhalil was thrown into panic by Wiwchar's arrest and texted Amero on the same day: "Zelda [Wiwchar] first degree murder I wonder if I fucked". Amero texted back: "If he rat yup".

On 8 August 2012, Alkhalil's condo was raided by the Sûreté du Québec and the Service de police de la Ville de Montréal with warrants for the arrest of both Alkhalil and Amero who had both already fled. On 1 November 2012 as part of Project Loquace, Alkhalil was charged in absentia in Montreal with drug trafficking. On 19 November 2012, Suhhveer "Sukh" Dhak, the boss of the Dhak-Duhre gang and his bodyguard Thomas Mantel, were murdered in Vancouver. On 23 February 2013, Alkhalil was arrested in Greece where he had been living under a forged French passport and working as an haute couture designer. Alkhalil was extradited from Greece to Canada in February 2015 to face the murder charges for the Raposo slaying.

The trial for the Raposo murder began in April 2017 in Toronto and the centerpiece of the Crown's case presented by the Crown Attorney Maurice Gillezeau were the 41,420 texts made by the accused over a three-month period in 2012. Alkhalil pleaded not guilty, but chose not to testify in his own defence as he did not wish to face difficult questions from Gillezeau about his texts. The defense lawyers claimed that the accused were overtly fond of gangster films with the defense maintaining that the incriminating texts were merely fantasy role-playing and not plans to murder Raposo. On 11 May 2017, Alkhalil, Nero, Caputo and Wiwchar were all convicted of first-degree murder for the murder of Raposo, and sentenced to life in prison, with the jury ruling that the Crown had presented overwhelming evidence that Alkhalil, Nero and Caputo had hired Wiwchar to kill Raposo. Alkhalil was placed in segregation in January 2019 when prison guards found in his cell various forbidden items such as a cell phone and steroids.

When Alkhalil arrived in Montreal on 25 April 2019 to face the Project Locquace charges, he was held in maximum security wing of the Montreal jail under the grounds that he was a "high flight risk". Alkhalil sued against these conditions and in March 2020, Justice Michel Pennou sided with the Crown, ruling "Alkhalil is associated with high level organized crime; he represents a significant flight risk; his security could be compromised because of possible antagonisms". On 21 August 2020, Alkhalil was found guilty in Montreal on the Project Loquace charges of conspiracy to import cocaine, conspiracy to traffic in cocaine and trafficking in cocaine. The Crown Attorney Tian Meng called Alkhalil a major drug trafficker. On 31 August 2020, Justice Anne-Marie Jacques accepted Meng's submission to the court and sentenced Alkhalil to 8 years in prison.

Starting on 29 June 2021, Amero and Alkhalil were on trial in Vancouver for the 2012 murders of the rival gangsters Sandip Duhre and Suhhveer Dhak with the Crown presenting the thesis that Alkhalil and Amero hired Wiwchar to kill Duhre. On 21 July 2022, Alkhalil escaped from the North Fraser Pretrial Center jail. Much controversy arose when the Royal Canadian Mounted Police (RCMP) released photographs to the media that the police claimed to be of the two men who helped Alkhali escape, but who turned not to be the men in question. The photographs that the police released of the men purported to be Alkhalil's accomplices were just random photographs available for purchase off the Internet, which a police spokeswomen, Deanna Law, sheepishly admitted in a press conference were not definitely from the security cameras at the North Fraser Pretrial Center as the RCMP had first claimed. One police source who asked to remain anonymous told Kim Bolan, the crime correspondent of The Vancouver Sun: "If they don't find him in the first 48 hours, he's gone." The staff of North Fraser Pretrial Center only noticed that Alkhalil had escaped 20 minutes later and the police were not called until 42 minutes after the escape. The escape occurred at 6: 48 pm and it was only at 10: 19 pm that the public was informed. One RCMP officer who asked not to be named told Bolan: "I think there was some failures in the response. They were slow at the switch to disseminate information, slow at the switch to co-ordinate a response." On 12 August 2022, Alkhalil was charged with "forcible prison break with intent to free himself" and escaping "lawful custody".

Kash Heed, a former policeman who served as the Solicitor General of British Columbia in 2009–2010, stated about the Alkhalil escape: "I have never in my 32 years in policing, and my time since policing, seen such an inept investigation on a suspected murderer that has escaped from one of our secure institutions. I visited that institution, you just have to look at the incredible surveillance system that they have there, the quality of that system, and how could you not have images of individuals that assisted in that escape not available to the public. But you have photos taken off the internet, that are not even them, that you publish as accomplices to the escape? For you to get into the facility or anywhere near where some of the prisoners would be, especially some of these high risk prisoners, you will have gone through several surveillance systems or you ought to have gone through several surveillance systems, which would have captured your image. Alkhalil obviously had a well-planned escape plan, and who knows where he is right now, whether he is sitting low and waiting for things to calm down, or he's already made his way to another country. Will we ever know? I'm not sure. But do we have confidence that the investigation will lead us or give us the answers? No, I don't have the confidence in it." Heed told the journalist Bob Mackin that the RCMP had shown an abysmal level of incompetence in allowing Alkhalil to escape from a maximum security wing of a jail; in not even being capable of releasing the correct photographs of Alkhalil's two accomplices; and being incapable of recapturing Alkhalil. For all these reasons he demanded a public inquiry to assess who was responsible for these failures.

Laviolette said that the escape was "well planned" and that: "So my expectation is that he was out of the country as quick as he was out of the jail. He's already demonstrated that you can go to Europe, you can go to South America, you can go wherever the hell you want because money is no object". When asked by Bolan if he was surprised by the escape, Laviolette replied: "Yes, because I would have expected them to keep him locked down much tighter considering who he was and what he's capable of. And he's already fled before. But at the same time, I kind of laughed and I thought, 'Of course he did. If anybody's going to do that, it's going to be him. He'll be able to pull it off.' And sure enough, he did." A senior RCMP officer speaking of the condition of anonymity said that Alkhalil had "probably" left Canada within an hour of his escape and it is likely that he will never be recaptured.

On 29 August 2022, Amero was convicted of two counts of conspiracy to commit murder in connection with the slayings of Duhre and Dhak while Alkhalil was convicted in absentia of the one count of first-degree murder for the killing of Duhre and another count of conspiracy to commit murder with regard to the killing of Dhak. On 18 October 2022, the RCMP declared Alkhalil to be Canada's most wanted man and offered a $250,000 reward for information about his current whereabouts. On 7 September 2025, it was reported that Alkhalil had been arrested in Qatar. The lawyer Richard Kurland described Qatar has a "haven" for criminals on the run from justice. Canada has no extradition treaty with Qatar, making it highly unlikely that Alkhalil will being returned to Canada in the foreseeable future. In a subsequent press conference, Corporal Sarbjit Sangha of the RCMP stated "at this point Rabih Alkhalil remains at large" and denied reports he had been arrested in Qatar. However, three men, namely Edward Ayoub, John Potvin, and Ryan van Gool, were charged with conspiracy to commit prison breach and prison breach for allegedly assisting Alkhalil escape from the jail in 2022. Ayoub and van Gool were arrested while Potvin remained at large.

Sergeant Tammy Lobb stated in a press conference: "In March of 2024, while conducting the Alkhalil investigation, police uncovered information that has now led to additional charges against Ryan van Gool and two men for allegedly conspiring to murder an individual in Kamloops". Charged with conspiracy to commit murder were van Gool along with Bryce Telford and Scott Telford. In an article, Bolan insisted that police sources had informed her that Alkhalil was indeed arrested in Qatar, but owing to the lack of a Qatari-Canadian extradition treaty, Canada was engaged in difficult talks with the Qataris for his return and the RCMP was staying silent on the matter for the moment. On 19 September 2025, Potvin was arrested in Spain on an Interpol red notice issued by Canada. On 25 September 2025, Sangha announced in a press conference that Alkhalil had been arrested in Qatar and Canada was engaged in talks for his return.

== Books ==
- Edwards, Peter; Nájera, Luis (2021). The Wolfpack The Millennial Mobsters Who Brought Chaos and the Cartels to the Canadian Underworld. Toronto: Random House of Canada. ISBN 9780735275409.
- Langton, Jerry (2013). The Notorious Bacon Brothers : inside gang warfare on Vancouver streets. Etobicoke, Ont.: J. Wiley and Sons Canada. ISBN 978-1118388679.
