= Wolfpack Alliance =

Canadian organized crime group

- Founded: 2010; 16 years ago
- Founders: Larry Amero; Jonathan Bacon; James Riach; Randy Naicker
- Founding location: Vancouver, British Columbia, Canada
- Years active: 2010–present
- Territory: Lower Mainland, Southern Ontario, and Montreal
- Ethnicity: European Canadian, Palestinian Canadian, Iranian Canadian and Indo-Canadian
- Activities: Drug trafficking, money laundering, murder, murder for hire
- Allies: Alkhalil family Hells Angels MC; Rizzuto family Independent Soldiers; West End Gang; Red Scorpions; Sinaloa Cartel
- Rivals: Dhak Crime Group; Duhre Crime Group; Siderno Group; United Nations
- Notable members: Martino Caputo; Nick Nero; Johnny Raposo; Dean Michael Wiwchar; Darren Smith]]

The Wolfpack Alliance is a Canadian organized crime group. The Canadian journalist Peter Edwards and the Mexican journalist Luis Horacio Nájera wrote that the Wolfpack Alliance were "...a loosely allied and multi-ethnic group of mostly Millennial-aged gangsters who operated across the country". The police described the Wolfpack as not a single group, but rather a consortium that united several organized crime groups together.

== History ==
=== Origins ===
The Wolfpack Alliance was founded in 2010 in the Lower Mainland of British Columbia by the Hells Angels member Larry Amero as a "side project". Hells Angels are allowed to create "side projects", as long as the other members of the relevant chapter are aware of the project and allowed to participate if they so desire. The other leaders of the Wolfpack Alliance were Jonathan Bacon of the Red Scorpions and Randy Naicker and James Riach of the Independent Soldiers. The first public evidence of the existence of the group was that Bacon was often seen with Amero on the latter's speedboat, Steroids & Silicone. The Wolfpack worked as distributors of cocaine from the Sinaloa Cartel of Mexico, whose leader was Joaquín Guzmán, better known by his moniker El Chapo ("the shorty").

=== Expansion ===
The Wolfpack soon took in other members, most notably the Alkhalil family; Johnny Raposo of Toronto; Martino "Lil Guy" Caputo of Niagara-on-the-Lake; Shane Maloney of Montreal's West End Gang; and Nick Nero, a drug smuggler from Niagara Falls. The oldest of the Alkhalil brothers, Nabil Alkhalil, fled Canada in 2010, and settled in Ciudad López Mateos while continuing to be active in organised crime. Nabil Alkhalil served as the liaison with the Sinaloa Cartel. Rabih "Robby" Alkhalil, the youngest of the Alkhalil brothers, lived in Montreal, where he owned an expensive penthouse condominium at 555 René Lévesque Boulevard West, with a view of the St. Lawrence river that made his condo one of the most expensive in Old Montreal. Caputo, who officially worked as a property developer in the "Golden Horseshoe" area, served as the Rizzuto family's agent for the greater Toronto area.

The Wolfpack leaders used encrypted texts on the Pretty Good Privacy system to communicate, and wrote frankly about plans to commit murders. Caputo had no criminal record and was one of Toronto's most successful businessmen, who owned and operated the well regarded Savourie restaurant from 1996 to 2004. Sergeant Brenda Winpenny of the Combined Forces Special Enforcement Unit – BC (CFSEU-BC) told the journalist Rattan Mall in 2017: “We’ve publicly confirmed in the past that the Wolfpack has a presence not only across Canada but internationally. They have had a presence in other provinces, like Ontario, for at least a couple years... and several gang members who have ties to the Wolfpack, like Hells Angel Larry Amero, have been back east for several years – albeit Larry’s in jail but he has spent a lot of time between here and Ontario and Quebec".

Peter Edwards, the crime correspondent of The Toronto Star, described the Wolfpack leaders as: "“They grew up as kids craving attention, who wanted to be rock stars, but didn’t really have any skills. They displayed an overwhelming sense of entitlement. Through their drug associations, they became more interesting to girls who are out of their league." Edwards stated the group expanded via the internet, saying: "They're bonded by the internet, not by geography. Some are in Vancouver, some are in Montreal, some are in Toronto and it doesn’t really matter – they can move around. You could say, ‘that group is from Woodbridge, those groups from Simcoe Street and Oshawa. With the Wolfpack, there isn’t a place, there’s just a shared feeling or need for the internet."

Luis Nájera, the former crime correspondent of La Reforma newspaper of Ciudad Juárez stated about the Wolfpack: "Technology, the internet, changes a lot of dynamics of power, relationships, contacts and businesses, both legal and illegal…the internet became a platform where they don’t necessarily need to be physically together always. Do you remember in the old days or in the movies where the Mafiosos got together in a dark place, or ugly warehouse, and they sit and discuss business? Those times are pretty much over now.""

=== The Vancouver operation and the gang war ===
On 16 October 2010, Gurmit Singh Dhak, the co-boss of the Dhak-Duhre gang was murdered. Dhak was shot in the face in his vehicle at the parking lot of the Metrotown Mall in Burnaby. Kim Bolan, the crime correspondent of The Vancouver Sun newspaper, wrote in 2018: "Dhak’s execution was the flashpoint for a near decade-long war that has raged across the province and left many dead and wounded in its wake. Few of those behind the violence have been held to account."

Suhhveer "Sukh" Dhak, the younger brother of Gurmit, believed that the Wolfpack Alliance were the ones responsible for his brother's murder, and vowed to avenge him. Dhak had hired a team of four hitmen to hunt down the Wolfpack and stayed in touch with them via encrypted text messages on his cellphone. The hit-team placed GPS tracking devices on bottoms of vehicles belonging to the Wolfpack as a way to track them down.

On 14 August 2011, Jonathan Bacon was murdered via gunfire outside the Delta Grand Hotel in Kelowna. At about 2:45 pm on 14 August 2011, a white Porsche Cayenne carrying six people was leaving the parking lot of the Delta Grand Hotel, when a group of four masked gunmen carrying AK-47 assault rifles opened fire. The gunmen fired at least 30 shots into the Cayenne, killing Bacon, wounding Amero, and leaving a 21-year waitress, Leah Hadden-Watts, a quadriplegic, as she took a bullet straight through her neck, severing her spinal cord.

After the Kelowna incident, Amero relocated to Montreal, where he lived as a guest in Alkhalil's condo. Edwards and Nájera wrote that Amero and Alkhalil "...tightened up their own connections with Mexican cocaine suppliers" during their time in Montreal. A key member of the Wolfpack proved to be Shane Kenneth "Wheels" Maloney of the West End Gang. Alkhalil in texts to Nero described Maloney as providing the chemists, who tested the purity of cocaine that was being brought into Montreal.

The West End Gang controls the Port of Montreal, which enabled drug smuggling on a massive scale. Maloney was known as "Wheels", due to his use of a wheelchair, as he is a paraplegic owing to a vehicle incident. He was considered one of the most important Wolfpack leaders. In 2012, Maloney was charged with smuggling on behalf of both the West End Gang and the Wolfpack, and was convicted in 2017. The Wolfpack Alliance were reported to have smuggled in about 400 kilograms of cocaine per month into Montreal.

The United Nations gang aligned itself with the Dhak-Duhre group against the Wolfpack. On 16 January 2012, a United Nations gang member, Salih "Sal" Abdulaziz Sahbaz of Surrey, was murdered in Mexico. His corpse was not looted and he had some US$20,000 in his wallet. On 17 January 2012, Sandip "Dippy" Duhre, the co-boss of the Dhak-Duhre group, was shot dead while leaving a Vancouver hotel in a revenge attack for the Delta Grand Hotel incident. On 18 January 2012, a United Nations gang leader, Thomas Gisby, was almost killed in a bombing of his mobile home in Whistler. Gisby fled to Mexico after the murder attempt.

On 28 April 2012, Gisby was murdered at a Starbucks In Nuevo Vallarta at about 9 am. The killers of Gisby used a .44 Magnum handgun, a rare weapon in Mexico, where the standard weapons used in murders are AK-47 assault rifles, 9 mm handguns or .38 pistols. A Wolfpack member who called himself Sossa texted Alkhalil at 10:16 am the same day from Mexico to claim credit for Gisby's murder, and exaggerated the details such as claiming to have used 50 calibre gun.

Naicker was shot dead outside of a Starbucks café in Port Moody on 25 June 2012. On 19 November 2012, Suhhveer "Sukh" Dhak and his bodyguard Thomas Mantel were murdered. Between 2010-2013, there were 20 murders in the Lower Mainland, related to the gang war started by the murder of Gurmit Singh Dhak.

A member of the Dhak-Duhre group, Manjot Singh Dhillon, took to posting images of dead wolves on his Facebook profile starting in early January 2013, as a public way of indicating he was planning to strike at the Wolfpack. At about 9:30 pm on 13 January 2013, Dhillon was found almost dead by the side of Colebrook Road in Surrey, with several bullet wounds. He died later that night of his wounds at the hospital. On 14 January 2013, Manjinder "Manny" Singh Hairan, one of the gunmen who had killed Jonathan Bacon in 2011, was shot dead in Surrey.

On 28 January 2013, Jaskaran Singh Sandhu of the Dhak-Duhre group, was murdered in Surrey. In February, Amritpal "Paul" Saran of the Dhak-Duhre group was murdered in Surrey. On 24 April 2013, Craig Widdifield was murdered outside of a gym at the Morgan Crossing shopping mall in Surrey. Widdifield was not a member of the Wolfpack, but killed only for being a friend of Amero.

=== The Montreal operation ===
The Montreal wing of the Wolfpack operated a smuggling ring, bringing cocaine via secret compartments in trucks into and from the United States. Montreal is regarded as the most important city in the Canadian underworld, as it is a major port city with ocean access, well connected via highways to other cities, and is only 332 miles from New York City, the biggest and richest drug market in North America. Edwards and Nájera wrote that Montreal was the "epicenter" of Canadian organized crime, as whatever faction that dominates Montreal dominates the national organized crime scene, as the organized crime scene in Vancouver was "fractured". Toronto was dominated by 7 'Ndrangheta families who had a "limited" range outside of the Toronto area, and the Mafia families of Hamilton were "largely a local phenomenon".

Edwards and Nájera wrote that the leaders of the Montreal Mafia dealt directly with the "Five Families" of New York, while the Canadian Hells Angels whose headquarters are in Montreal were Canada's most powerful criminal syndicate, with chapters or puppet gangs in every province. Both Amero and Alkhalil lived in Montreal not so much because of their interest in seizing control of the drug market in Montreal, but rather because they wanted to use Montreal as a stepping stone to enter the New York drug market. The two men in charge who answered to Amero and Alkhail, were Frédéric Lavoie and Timoleaon Psiharis. Psharis and Lavoie bribed truck drivers who were employed by bonded trucking companies to smuggle cocaine. The Wolfpack in Montreal smuggled about 400 kilograms of cocaine per month.

On 8 August 2012, Alkhalil's condo was raided by the Sûreté du Québec and the Service de police de la Ville de Montréal with warrants for the arrest of both Alkhalil and Amero, who had both already fled. Found inside of Alkhalil's condo was a group photograph of the Wolfpack leaders taken in front of Parliament Hill in Ottawa. The fact that Amero, Alkhalil, and Shane "Wheels" Maloney of the West End Gang were in the center, indicated that they were the leaders of the group, as it is the normal custom in the Canadian underworld for leaders of the gang to be placed in the center of a group photograph.

More trouble for the Wolfpack occurred on August 11, 2012 when a Montreal Wolfpack drug courier Ricardo Ruffolo was murdered when answering his door. On September 26, 2012, Lavoie called a meeting in a downtown Montreal bar with Mihale Leventis and another man who remains unidentified, who was working as a police informer. The meeting discussed plans to import cocaine from Mexico and Peru.

=== The Niagara operation ===
The most troublesome member of the Wolfpack to the other members of the group proved to be Nicola "Nick" Nero of Niagara Falls, who was described by a high school classmate as "dumb as a bag of hair". After his release on parole, Nero became closely associated with Martino Caputo of Toronto, who worked for the Rizzuto family of Montreal.

The police suspected that Nero did not intend to abide by his parole conditions, as he violated his bail conditions. The police started an investigation of Nero dubbed Project Ink. In February 2012, the police seized 110 kilograms of cocaine worth $30 million from a warehouse in St. Catharines, which the police knew belonged to Nero. Nero had become one of the most important cocaine smugglers in Canada, bringing in an average of 400 kilograms of cocaine per week into the Niagara Peninsula via boats and trucks.

In one of his texts, Nero wrote to the car dealer-turned-drug dealer Alfonso "Al" Inclima, on 2 May 2012, that the Air Canada airline was deeply corrupt and it was possible for the Wolfpack to smuggle a shipment of cocaine worth CA$750,000 via Air Canada per week into Toronto. When Inclima indicated that it was possible to smuggle cocaine into Argentina, Nero exploded in rage at him, texting him: "Bro!!! U [you] are suppose to resolve things and get answers and confirm dates. I'm more confused now!!!!!"

Later the same day, Nero texted Inclima : "Do they have british airways[?] We get 4000 pds [pounds] in uk [United Kingdom] per". The profit from selling cocaine in the United Kingdom was US$64,000 per kilogram, which was double the profits from selling cocaine in Toronto, which made Nero very keen on his British expansion plans. Nero also wanted to smuggle cocaine into Shanghai and asked Inclima to find some corrupt aircrews flying to Shanghai who were willing to work for him. Nero was also texting his friend, Mohammed Reza Amin Torabi of Vancouver, a bodybuilder who twice won the Mr. Canada, about bringing in a shipment of cocaine via the Port of Vancouver, with 25% of the profits to go to Torabi.

=== The Raposo murder ===
In the spring of 2012, a love triangle led to a murder. Caputo and Raposo, who were supposed best friends, were both having an affair with the same women who worked as a waitress in a Toronto restaurant, whom Edwards and Nájera noted "...was not to be confused with either the mother of Raposo's son or Caputo's moneyed girlfriend". Caputo used Nero as his instrument for disposing of his romantic rival Raposo. Caputo in his texts to Nero expressed much hatred of Raposo, as he made numerous disparaging remarks about him from April 2012 onward and promoted the thesis that Raposo was an informer.

Raposo, Nero, Alkhalil and Caputo were planning to bring in a shipment of cocaine from Mexico via Chicago that was worth $5 million, with the profits to be split equally four ways. The last three decided to kill Raposo to take his share of the profits for themselves. To assist with the planned murder, on 18 May 2012 Caputo texted to Nero pictures of Raposo together with his address and that of the Sicilian Sidewalk Café, which was Raposo's favorite coffee shop, saying he should pass this information along to Alkhalil's hitman. At the same time, Caputo had attended the baptism of Raposo's son by his common-law wife Monika, and told him numerous times "I love you, bro!". Nero requested that Caputo send pictures of Raposo's son from the baptism to the hitman.

On 21 May 2012, Alkhalil offered his favorite hitman, Dean Michael Wiwchar, $100,000 in cash for killing Raposo. Wiwchar who never met Raposo and did not know nor cared why Alkhalil wanted Raposo dead, promptly accepted the offer. Wiwchar texted Alkhalil back on the same afternoon: "Ice cream boy [Raposo] is getting it".

On 23 May 2012, Nero was arrested at the St. Catharines half-way house without incident, as the supposed "tough guy" Nero offered no resistance. The same day that Nero was arrested, his fiancée Tawnya Del Ben Fletcher was arrested in Niagara-on-the-Lake and charged with narcotic possession for the purpose of trafficking; conspiracy to import narcotics; conspiracy to traffic in narcotics; conspiracy to possess narcotics for the purpose of trafficking; and counselling to commit obstruction of justice. As Nero's parole conditions had forbidden him to own a cellphone, he left his cellphone at Fletcher's condo. At the time of her arrest, she owned two condos, one in Niagara-on-the-Lake and another condo in Yorkville; two luxury sports automobiles; was wearing a $750,000 engagement ring; and had $1 million in cash in the Yorkville condo.

Nero could not remember his email address and passport to the Pretty Good Privacy network, so he wrote his email address "Cervezafrya@encryptroid.com" and his password "sharp0" on a yellow sticky note, which was found by the police right next to his cell phone on the kitchen countertop in Fletcher's Niagara-on-the-Lake condo, following his arrest on 23 May 2012. Nero also wrote down his password and email address, which was found on another sticky pad note placed next to his laptop computer.

The columnist Christie Blatchford noted: "Among the things they [the police] saw and photographed was a sticky note with Nero’s email and password, which later let them bypass the data encryption program called PGP. The initials stand for Pretty Good Privacy; alas, when the user thoughtfully provides his secret password on a sticky, it’s easily defeated." The Sinaloa Cartel had long had doubts about the competence of the Wolfpack, especially Nero, and decided after his arrest to move into Canada themselves.

On 24 May 2012, Wiwchar flew to Toronto and began to hunt Raposo, using the information provided by Caputo to learn about the Bloor West Village neighborhood that Raposo lived in, as Wiwchar needed to know where to find Raposo and the best escape route after killing him. Raposo was aware that Alkhalil and Amero had become inexplicably distant towards him, and told his common-law wife Monika that was planning to visit Montreal soon to see the Wolfpack leaders, to resolve whatever the issues there might be. On 18 June 2012, Wiwchar shot Raposo at the Sicilian Sidewalk Café on Toronto's College Street. Wiwchar walked into the Sicilian Sidewalk Café dressed as a construction worker while wearing a dust mask and a wig.

As the ardent football fan Raposo intensely followed the Ireland vs. Italy Euro Cup football match being aired live on the café's television, Wiwchar walked up to him and shot him four times in the head and once in the neck from behind. The same day, Alkhalil texted Wiwchar: "Time we put u [you] in sniper school I think. this seems too easy for u". Wiwchar texted back: "LOL! I had the whole construction uniform on mullet helment [helmet] dusk mask orange side road shirt and rocker shades lol I sat down and orderd a corona". Caputo visited Raposo's widow Monika on the evening of that day to express his sympathy, while claiming that he was full of sorrow over the murder of his "best friend" Raposo.

On 21 June 2012, Wiwchar was arrested in Toronto. When told by a police constable that he was under arrest for first-degree murder, Wiwchar asked "Which one?". Alkhalil was thrown into panic by Wiwchar's arrest, and texted Amero the same day "Zelda [Wiwchar] first degree murder I wonder if I fucked". Amero texted back: "If he rat yup". The cocaine shipment worth $5 million arrived in a Toronto junkyard, but was stolen by an unknown person before Caputo and Alkhalil received it.

The Sinaloa Cartel were furious with the theft of the cocaine, which the Wolfpack had received on consignment, and threatened to send up killers from Mexico to torture and murder all of the Wolfpack for their incompetence in losing $5 million in cocaine. Caputo fled Canada to Germany, where he was arrested in Cologne on 16 February 2013 while attempting to go to Poland with a forged Italian passport. Alkhalil fled to Greece, and was arrested in Athens on 23 February 2013 while living on a forged French passport. Both Caputo and Alkhalil were returned to Canada following extradition requests to face charges of first-degree murder in connection with Raposo's slaying.

=== Project Loquace ===
On November 1, 2012, the Sûreté du Québec and the Service de police de la Ville de Montréal as part of Project Loquace arrested 103 members of the Wolfpack in Montreal on the basis of a wire worn by the informer. Psiharis fled to his native Greece. On 20 November 2012, the burned corpse of Psiharis was found in the Greek countryside. Psiharis had been tortured by his killers and his face was burned off with acid, before he was killed with a bullet through his head. The murder of Psiharis remains unsolved.

Lavoie escaped to Colombia on a forged Bahamian passport. In Colombia, Lavoie joined forces with a Canadian mixed martial arts fighter and gangster, Steven Skinner, in a drug smuggling ring. On the morning of May 11, 2014, the dismembered body of Lavoie was discovered on a bridge along La Vereda Pan de Azucar (Sugar Bread Footpath) in the countryside outside of Sabaneta. The killers of Lavoie had chopped him into four pieces while he was still alive. The four pieces of Lavoie were placed in plastic bags and left on the bridge as a warning. Lavoie's murder remains unsolved. It is believed that both Psiharis and Lavoie were killed to punish them for recruiting a police informer into the Wolfpack. The extreme sadism shown by the killers of Psiharis and Lavoie is typical of the Sinaloa Cartel's killers, and the police believe that both murders may have very well been the work of the Sinaloa Cartel.

=== The downfall of the Wolfpack ===
The Wolfpack were used by Guzmán and the Sinaloa Cartel to establish a drug distribution network in Canada, which allowed them to ultimately by-pass the Wolfpack, as the Sinaloa cartel took over the networks that the Wolfpack had established. By early 2014, the Sinaloa Cartel had cut out the middlemen in the form of the Wolfpack and started to distribute cocaine themselves in Canada, rending the Wolfpack irrelevant. The Sinaloa Cartel came to prefer operating in Canada, owing to its weak justice system with regard to financial crimes, which made Canada an ideal place for money laundering. In addition, it is extremely easy for members of the Sinaloa Cartel to obtain Canadian passports both legally and illegally. Edwards and Nájera wrote: "The Wolfpack helped to usher the cartels into Canada and both profited and suffered for their greed and ambition. Through their actions, a dark corner was rounded and there could be no turning back".

In January 2014, Riarch was arrested in the Philippines on charges of smuggling drugs into the Philippines from Mexico. On September 9, 2014, Nero was convicted of drug trafficking, gangsterism and living off the proceeds of crime. Mohamed Reza Amin Torabi, the former Mr. Canada bodybuilder and Wolfpack drug smuggler made a plea bargain with the Crown in 2015, where in exchange for a guilty plea, he was sentenced to 7 years in prison.

Despite the way that Sinaloa Cartel had pushed the Wolfpack aside, the group still retained a vestigial existence on the margins of Canadian organized crime. An Independent Soldier and Wolfpack member, Sukhvir Singh Deo, moved from Surrey to Toronto. In March 2014, Deo was arrested on charges of smuggling cocaine, but was released after he posted bail. After his release, Deo went into hiding. On 23 May 2016, Deo made the international news when he attended a Toronto Raptors basketball game at the Rogers Center, and abused the referees for supposedly favoring the visiting Cleveland Cavaliers team so violently that he was expelled from the building.

Deo's abuse of the referees led to several YouTube videos being made about him as an example of an obnoxious Toronto Raptors fan. On 7 June 2016, Deo was murdered in Toronto by two killers disguised as construction workers. Deo had parked his vehicle in the alley known locally as Cowbell Lane at the corner of Yonge Street and Eglinton Avenue, and seemed to be waiting for someone. Two hitmen dressed as construction workers walked down Cowbell Lane and shot Deo 14 times. Deo's murder made newspaper headlines in his native India, with The Times of India running a frontpage story entitled "A gangster and a NBA fan". Authors Edwards and Nájera described Deo's murder as typical of the Wolfpack, who had an obsession with attracting attention to themselves.

The Wolfpack became involved in a gang war in Toronto in 2016-2018 with the Siderno Group. One of the mid-ranking Wolfpack leaders, Tassos Leventis, moved from Montreal to Toronto, where in June 2016 he very publicly challenged and insulted the Commisso brothers, who lead the Commisso 'ndrina in a Toronto restaurant. The incident ended with an angry Leventis picking up and throwing a chair at the Commisso brothers. On 16 August 2016, John Ignagni of the Commisso 'ndria was murdered in Toronto. Ignagni was a friend of the Commissos, was a member of the Vagabonds outbiker gang, and had been a member of the Wolfpack until the summer of 2016, when he fell out after not paying a drug debt.

Like other Wolfpack leaders, Leventis often used WhatsApp and Telegram to communicate, part of a tendency towards a democratisation of Canadian organized crime, as younger, more technologically savvy criminals used messaging services to communicate with their leaders. Leventis was active in Mexico, where he had been imprisonesd for six months in 2009 on charges of narcotics trafficking. On 30 January 2017, Leventis was shot on George Street in Toronto and was able to make his way to his condo, where he bled to death. On 29 June 2018, Cosimo "Coco" Commisso, not to be confused with his cousin Cosimo "The Quail" Commisso, was murdered in Woodbridge, along with his mistress Chantelle Almedia, who had the misfortune of being in his car when the killer struck.

Peter Edwards, the crime correspondent of The Toronto Star, stated in 2017: "On one side are the aggressive young computer-friendly newcomers from B.C. and Quebec allied to a gang called The Wolfpack Alliance. On the other side are the old guard — the GTA [Greater Toronto Area] arm of the traditional ’Ndrangheta family of Cosimo "The Quail" Commisso of Siderno, Italy." Lindsey Houghton of CFSEU-BC stated: "We’ve seen and heard the name Wolfpack over the last year [2016]. We’ve heard their name come up in places like Kamloops and Surrey. So they are still very active and groups like the Red Scorpions and Independent Soldiers – these groups are still active and prominent in that world.”

On 11 May 2017, Wiwchar, Caputo, Alkhalil and Nero were all found guilty of first-degree murder in Toronto in connection with Raposo's murder in 2012. The accused were all sentenced to life imprisonment with no chance of parole for the next 25 years. As the guilty verdicts were announced, Wiwchar "smirked" in the courtroom, as he seemed to take a perverse pride in being found guilty of first-degree murder. Nero looked stunned. Alkhalil showed no emotion. Caputo kept shaking his head and looking at his family. Nero was attacked in prison by another prisoner, who tried to kill him with a home-made knife. The attempt failed, but one of Nero's eyeballs was ripped out from the socket, leaving him blind in one eye.

It is believed that the murder attempt was to punish him for leaving his email address and passport to the Pretty Good Privacy network, out in plain view in Fletcher's condo. On February 28, 2018, Riarch was convicted in the Philippines of drug trafficking, and was sentenced to life imprisonment. The Sinaloa Cartel is believed to have placed a contract on the lives of Caputo and the other Wolfpack leaders for losing $5 million in cocaine in 2012, an incident that has not been forgiven or forgotten. As Caputo is serving a life sentence for his role in Raposo's murder, on 18 August 2019, his younger brother Paolo Caputo, who had no known Mafia associations beyond his relationship with his brother, was murdered. The police believed that the Sinaloa Cartel had Paolo Caputo killed, as a surrogate for killing his brother.

Since 29 June 2021, Amero and Alkhalil were on trial in Vancouver for the 2012 murders of the rival gangsters Sandip Duhre and Suhhveer Dhak, with the Crown presenting the thesis that Alkhalil and Amero hired Wiwchar to kill Duhre. On 21 July 2022, Alkhalil escaped from the North Fraser Pretrial Center jail, and is now a free man. On August 29, 2022, Amero was convicted of two counts of conspiracy to commit murder, in connection with the slayings of Duhre and Dhak.

=== Continued operations ===
As of 2023, the organization is still recognized by law enforcement as being actively involved in organized crime. Staff Sgt. Lindsey Houghton of the Combined Forces Special Enforcement Unit of British Columbia acknowledged in June 2023 that "Wolfpack has had significant controlling influence over the Downtown Eastside drug trade for several years" and that street-level drug traffickers operating in the neighborhood are "aligned" with the Wolfpack Alliance.

== Books ==
- Edwards, Peter; Nájera, Luis (2021). The Wolfpack The Millennial Mobsters Who Brought Chaos and the Cartels to the Canadian Underworld. Toronto: Random House of Canada. ISBN 9780735275409.
- Langton, Jerry (2013). The Notorious Bacon Brothers : Inside gang warfare on Vancouver streets. Etobicoke, ON: J. Wiley and Sons Canada. ISBN 978-1118388679.
