= Johnny Raposo =

Canadian gangster (1977-2012)

João "Johnny" Raposo (1977 – 18 June 2012) was a Canadian gangster and one of the leaders of the Wolfpack Alliance.

== The McCormick Boys ==
Raposo was born in Toronto, the son of Portuguese immigrants. Raposo's father abandoned him when he was young and he was raised by his single mother, whom he was very close to. Raposo grew up in the Little Portugal neighborhood on College Street. Raposo had the reputation as a pugnacious character as one who knew him recalled: "Johnny was nuts. He could fight. He was like a boxer fighter. He was a tough guy. He could drop a six two, 250-pound man, no problem. Johnny had heart, a big heart. He was treacherous and fearless". As a teenager, Raposo was the leader of the McCormick Boys street gang who sold drugs for the Mafia. The McCormick Boys gang were so-called because their favourite meeting spot was McCormick Park in downtown Toronto. A police officer recalled: "Raposo was the head dude, he was the moneyman. You could talk with him but he was shady – smart and crafty, very good at dodging surveillance. And when you talked to him it was all 'Yes, sir; No, sir.'" Starting in 1997, Raposo was often arrested by the police.

== Melo protégé ==
Raposo considered joining the Loners Motorcycle Club in the 1990s, but did not go through with his plans. Raposo was charged at various times with aggravated assault, possession of stolen goods and failure to comply with a court orders, but the Crown always withdrew the charges. Raposo idolized the boxer-gangster Eddie Melo, who served as the Toronto agent for the Cotroni family. Raposo became a protégé of Melo, and took to modelling himself after him to the extent that he was known as "Little Eddie" or "the Clone". Melo when introducing Raposo to his second wife Rhonda Sullivan said of him: "Don't like the good looks fool you. The kid is treacherous". A friend of the Melo family stated: "He [Melo] absolutely respected Johnny. He absolutely loved Johnny. He spent everday with Johnny. Every single day. They had a love. I don't think there was anyone Eddie trusted more than Johnny and could depend on more. "Johnny was the most loyal person ever. Ever. He was just the most loyal...He had heart and he never gave up". Under Melo's influence, Raposo started to import cocaine from Mexico and soon became one of Toronto's most successful drug dealers. Unlike many other cocaine dealers, Raposo refused to use cocaine himself and detested marijuana. Raposo's two principle drugs of choice were alcohol and coffee as the friend recalled: "Jonny was a hustler-bustler no-sleeper talker. Johnny was like the Energizer Bunny".

On 6 April 2001, Melo was murdered in Mississauga by Charles Gagné, a hitman from Montreal working for the 'Ndrangheta. Raposo was greatly depressed by Melo's murder, and took it upon himself to help raise Eduardo Melo Jr., the four-year-old son of Melo. Raposo came to be the most powerful gangster in the Little Portugal neighborhood on College Street as a friend stated: "John ran College Street." Raposo worked closely with Giuseppe "Pino" Ursino, the boss of a local 'Ndrangheta clan who called him "Johnny Pork Chop" or "Johnny Portuguese". Like Melo, Raposo often worked as an enforcer for the Mafia and 'Ndrangheta. Raposo invested his money from his gangster lifestyle into tow trucks and construction. His neighbor Roberta Menga described him as "a guy who said hi to everybody. He was happy all the time. I've never seen him drunk, or on drugs."

== The Wolfpack ==
Raposo was also close to Martino Caputo, the Toronto agent of Montreal's Rizzuto family. The two usually celebrated their holidays together and Caputo celebrated the New Year 2012 by frequently hugging Raposo and saying: "I love you bro". Through Caputo, Raposo joined the Wolfpack Alliance. Raposo lived in a house in Toronto with common-law wife, who was the mother of his son, and who was pregnant with his second child in the spring of 2012. Raposo moved to the Bloor West Village neighborhood, where he had built an expensive house for himself full of luxuries such as heated floors and a heated driveway to avoid shoveling snow in the wintertime. Raposo also had a house built for his mother on Crawford Street. Raposo was one of Toronto's top cocaine distributors.

Through Caputo, Raposo joined the Wolfpack Alliance. However, he was described as the "odd man out" in the Wolfpack as he was never close to the co-bosses of the Wolfpack, Robby Alkhalil and Larry Amero. Indeed, Alkhalil had never met Raposo in person and communicated with him via phone cells and texts. Raposo disliked Caputo's protégé, Nick Nero, whom he regarded as overbearing, insecure, and of very low intelligence. He often charged that Nero seemed jealous of his friendship with Caputo and was always seeking to drive a wedge between them. In 2011, Raposo beat up a man following a dispute over a gin rummy game in a gambling den in Mississauga and was due to face charges for the incident in 2012.

== Murder ==
Caputo was dating Tamara Fletcher, the identical twin sister of Tawnya Fletcher (Nero's fiancée). Raposo lived with his common-law wife, Monika. However, both Caputo and Raposo had a mistress on the side, who happened to be the same woman. The Canadian journalist Peter Edwards and the Mexican journalist Luis Nájera wrote the waitress whom both Caputo and Raposo were dating "...was not to be confused with either the mother of Raposo's son or Caputo's moneyed girlfriend". One knew both men very well who did not wish to be identified stated: "He [Caputo] was pretending to be Johnny's friend. He was a conniver. A real conniver... He was a weasel. Who goes and fucks your girlfriend behind your back?" Caputo became jealous of Raposo, and as he wanted the affections of his mistress all to himself, decided that Raposo had to be killed. Caputo used Nero as his instrument for disposing of his romantic rival Raposo. Caputo in his texts to Nero expressed much hatred of Raposo as made numerous disparaging remarks about him from April 2012 onward and promoted the thesis that Raposo was an informer.

Raposo, Nero, Alkhalil and Caputo had an agreement with the Sinaloa Cartel to bring into Toronto a shipment of cocaine from Mexico via Chicago worth $5 million. It had been agreed that the profits from the sale of the cocaine were to be split equally four ways. Prompted by Nero, it was decided to have Raposo killed to take his share of the profits for themselves. Twice. On 28 April 2012, Nero texted Alkhalil: "We split the load 3 ways. Me u [you] lil guy [Caputo]. The only thing is once we pick them up, we have to get him [Raposo] he is the biggest rat in the world. I told him don’t tell anyone I’m doing this for you but the retard can’t help his bigmouth". To assist with the planned murder, on 18 May 2012 Caputo texted to Nero pictures of Raposo together with his address and that of the Sicilian Sidewalk Café (which was Raposo's favourite coffee shop), saying he should pass this information along to Alkhalil's hitman. At the same time, Caputo had attended the baptism of Raposo's son by his common-law wife Monika and told him numerous times "I love you, bro!".

On 21 May 2012, Alkhalil offered his favourite hitman, Dean Michael Wiwchar, $100,000 in cash for killing Raposo. On the afternoon of 18 June 2012, Raposo was at the Sicilian Sidewalk Café in Little Italy, watching the Ireland vs. Italy Euro Cup soccer match being aired live on the café's television. Wiwchar, who was dressed as a construction worker, walked up from behind Raposo and shot him four times in the head and once in the neck.

Raposo had buried a stash of $500,000 in cash, which was stolen by one of his friends as soon as he heard of the murder. The shipment of cocaine from Chicago arrived in a Toronto junkyard, but was stolen by an unknown person before the Wolfpack could claim it. The Sinaloa Cartel was furious with the loss of a shipment of cocaine worth $5 million, and threatened to send up some hitmen from Mexico to torture and murder the Wolfpack leaders for their incompetence in losing the cocaine shipment. It emerged after Raposo's murder that his friend, Alfredo "Fat Freddy" Patriarca, had tipped off Raposo's killers about when he would be present at the Sicilian Sideway Café. Patriarca was murdered on 20 January 2016, possibly in revenge for his role in Raposo's murder. On 11 May 2017, Alkhalil, Nero, Caputo and Wiwchar were all convicted of Raposo's murder.

== Books ==
- Edwards, Peter; Nájera, Luis (2021). The Wolfpack The Millennial Mobsters Who Brought Chaos and the Cartels to the Canadian Underworld. Toronto: Random House of Canada. ISBN 9780735275409.
