= Shane Kenneth Maloney =

Canadian criminal and gang leader

Shane Kenneth Maloney (born 1977) is a Canadian criminal and the reputed leader of the West End Gang.

== West End Gang ==
Maloney was born in Montreal, where he is alleged to be the illegitimate son of Frank Ryan by his mistress, Sandra Maloney. In 1989, his mother moved to the Lower Mainland of British Columbia, where he grew up. In 2019, he told the National Parole Board: "I started selling weed when I was a kid at my mother's house...I wanted to go back to Montreal and my mom wasn't having it, so I was trying to be difficult". Maloney described his mother as a heavy drinker who was verbally abusive. When he was 15, his mother grew tired him of selling marijuana out of her house, and called the police, leading to his first criminal conviction. At the age of 16, he was expelled from high school and he returned to his hometown of Montreal.

In 1997, he was disabled in an accident and has used wheelchair since. His nickname of "Wheels" relates to his status as a man who uses a wheelchair. Maloney described himself as being depressed and full of rage at the world as a result of being paralyzed. Maloney used the insurance payments relating to his accident to invest in condos and in a fertilizer manufacturing company, both of which paid off handsomely. Maloney purchased luxury condos on Nuns' Island and in the West End of Vancouver along with a farm in North Glengarry. Maloney served as a promoter for Montreal nightclubs, which led him to start selling drugs. In 2001, Gerald Matticks, the boss of the West End Gang, was convicted of trafficking in narcotics. Maloney has been described in media reports as being the new boss of the West End Gang.

Maloney started to collect guns after obtaining a firearms permit in 2006. Maloney purchased 90 guns legally which included AR-15 semi-automatic rifles and handguns plus a number of illegal guns. He told the parole board: "I started collecting guns, legally and illegally. I enjoyed the engineering aspects of firearms. It's kind of fascinating to me why they work". Maloney denies being a member of the West End Gang and claims to be the victim of anti-Irish prejudice as he denies that the West End Gang even exists. In 2019, Maloney told the Parole Board: "I just happen to be Irish...I don't view myself as that [a West End Gang member]. I think it's more of a police name".

== The Wolfpack ==
Maloney became one of the leaders of the Wolfpack Alliance. As the West End Gang controls the port of Montreal, he was one of the most powerful leaders in the Wolfpack. The Wolfpack Alliance imported cocaine from Mexico with the primary supplier being the Sinaloa Cartel. On 9 January 2011, Maloney was at the Blue Parrot Bar in Playa del Carmen socializing with a number of Hells Angels and two policeman from the Service de police de la Ville de Montréal on vacation in Mexico. Maloney appeared to be attending a Hells Angels convention as there were numerous Hells Angels from Canada, the United States, Australia and Europe all attending the same party at the Blue Parrot. Another two policemen from the Service de police de la Ville de Montréal were upset about the number of off-duty policemen going into a VIP tent set up on the beach besides the Blue Parrot to socialize with the Hells Angels. One of the policemen used his phone to photograph the other policemen associating with the Hells Angels until one of the Angels, Marc-André Lachance of the Montreal chapter, noticed him. Lachance beat up the policeman, dragged him into the tent where the policeman was confronted by Maloney in his wheelchair who demanded to know why he was taking photographs. Throughout the night, Maloney served as the interrogator while the Angels tortured the policeman. The policeman later recalled when he looked into the mirror he could not recognize his own face as: "I did not recognize myself anymore. My eye was closed and I felt a liquid flow. I thought my eye was punctured. I said it to Lachance, but he told me he did not not care, threatening to bust the other eye with a pencil". At about 5: 30 am, the officer finally admitted to being a policeman. The officer later testified: "Maloney told me, pointing at Lachance, that if something were to happen to him, my family and I would be held responsible". The officer was beaten so badly that he had to spend five hours in a hospital.

Maloney was often mentioned in the texts sent by Rabih Alkhalil to Nick Nero concerning the cocaine that was being imported into Canada. Maloney was placed center in a group photograph taken of the Wolfpack leaders in front of Parliament Hill in Ottawa standing between Larry Amero of the Hells Angels and Alkhalil, which showed that he was one of the leaders of the Wolfpack as it is the custom in the Canadian underworld that leaders of gangs always stand in the center in group photographs. On 26 September 2012, one of Maloney's deputies, Mihale Leventis, was observed by the police sitting in a Montreal bar along with Frédéric Lavoie of the Wolfpack and another man where the discussion concerned plans to buy cocaine in Colombia and sell it in Greece and Canada and with gossip about internal developments in the Rizzuto family and the Hells Angels. Maloney was considered to be a gangster by Canada Revenue Agency who charged that he owed $3.3 million in unpaid taxes on his illegal income.

On 1 November 2012, Maloney was arrested as part of Project Loquace on charges of trafficking in cocaine, gangsterism, possession of illegal weapons, possession of illegal explosives, and assault causing bodily harm in connection with the Blue Parrot torture session in Mexico. Found inside of Maloney's condo on Nuns' Islands were $1.5 million in cash along with evidence that he ordered the armed robbery of a blasting company in Sainte-Sophie in August 2011 to steal dynamite. Also found inside of Maloney's condo were hundreds of guns, 1, 475 sticks of dynamite, two pounds of C-4 explosives and remote controls for setting off the C-4.

== In prison and on parole ==
In December 2013, in a plea bargain with the Crown, Maloney pleaded guilty to the assault charges in exchange for a lesser prison sentence. At the same time, Maloney sued the Crown, alleging that he had been held in "cruel and unusual" conditions at the Rivière-des-Prairies prison. Amongst the "cruel and unusual" conditions that Maloney complained about was that in his wing of the prison the TV was slightly smaller than the TVs in the other wings of the prison. On 22 April 2015, the head of the prison health sector wrote that Maloney had "expressed incoherent thoughts bordering on paranoia" as he insisted the other inmates and the prison guards were plotting against him. On 2 June 2015, Maloney was moved into another wing of the prison with the larger TV set that he craved at his request, but soon was involved in quarrels with the other prisoners. On 11 June 2015, the other prisoners asked that Maloney be moved out of their wing owing to his abrasive, unpleasant personality.

On 15 April 2016, Justice James Brunton of the Quebec Superior Count ruled in regard to Maloney's lawsuit: "Wheelchair-bound inmates are always detained in the health sector for security reasons. A wheelchair consists of many many metal parts which could be converted into weapons". Bruton ruled the prison staff had been very respectful of Maloney despite his "crude complaints and inappropriate language". Bruton ruled that Maloney being denied conjugal visits with his wife was not a violation of his human rights as the prison staff had informed him that he must cease expressing his "abrasive attitude" to the prison guards if he wanted to have sex with his wife. Bruton ruled that Maloney was in part a victim of being held in the hospital wing where many of the inmates suffered from "psychological" disorders that had a negative impact on his mental health. In 2016, Maloney was sued by the family of Richard ‘Acid’ Adams, a Mohawk marijuana smuggler on the Akwesasne reserve who vanished on 5 July 2009 and has not been seen or heard from since. Adams worked for Maloney and the Adams family believes he had something to do with his disappearance in 2009.

On 15 February 2017, Maloney was found guilty of the gangsterism, cocaine, weapons and explosives' charges as he pleaded guilty to all counts in a plea bargain. He was sentenced to five years in prison with his sentence to be served at the Collins Bay Institution. In December 2019, he was granted day parole. Maloney's claim to the National Parole Board that he had purchased the weapons and explosives to keep them out of the hands of criminals was dismissed as "stretches the bounds of credibility". Maloney stated he did not plan to return to Quebec and wanted to live in Ontario. He told the Parole Board that he had taken a business course in prison and wanted to work as an accountant. On 20 November 2020, he was granted full parole and settled in British Columbia.

In early 2021, his parole officer noted that Maloney appeared to have been beaten up. Maloney claimed to have been robbed, but the parole officer could not find evidence to support that claim. In April 2021, Maloney missed a meeting with his parole officer and his claims to have been struck in traffic were not considered to be believable. In 2022, the Parole Board noted: “In September 2021, your parole officer noted your level of paranoia was escalating. You also filed an unusual police complaint indicating a neighbour was spying on you and acting as an agent for the police: you stated he was jamming your cable, internet and phone.” It turned that Maloney had not paid his cable, phone and internet bills, and had been cut off from those services. Maloney refused to explain to his parole officer who was an individual known as “Honda Prelude Gas Kid” was that he was always texting and wheeled himself out of the meeting in anger. Maloney's parole was revoked and he was arrested on 28 October 2021.

In 2022, Maloney was again released on parole. On 12 September 2022, his parole was revoked and a warrant was issued for his arrest for being "unlawfully at large" on 16 September 2022. Maloney is at present a wanted man and has vanished.

== Books ==
- Edwards, Peter; Nájera, Luis (2021). The Wolfpack The Millennial Mobsters Who Brought Chaos and the Cartels to the Canadian Underworld. Toronto: Random House of Canada. ISBN 9780735275409.
