= Martino Caputo =

Italian-Canadian gangster

Martino Caputo (Italian pronunciation: [marˈtiːno kaˈpuːto]; born 1973) is an Italian-Canadian gangster who was the Toronto agent of the Rizzuto family of Montreal. Caputo is currently serving a life sentence for the 2012 murder of Johnny Raposo.

== Gangster ==
Caputo's family is from Capistrano, Calabria, Italy and is the son of Antonio Caputo and Vincenza Carnovale. Cauputo grew up in the Toronto area and settled in Niagara-on-the-Lake. Caputo had no criminal record prior to 2014 and was one of Toronto's most successful businessmen, who owned and operated the well regarded Savourie restaurant in Forest Hill from 1996 to 2004. Many regarded Caputo as a kindly and successful restaurateur who donated generously to charity. By contrast, the Crown Attorney at Caputo's 2014 trial, Kenneth Walsh, called Caputo "a high-level drug partner in a sophisticated criminal organization with the potential to make millions of dollars. There are clearly two sides to Mr. Caputo. One was a very upstanding citizen - benevolent, generous and kind. His supporters don’t know about the second side of Mr. Caputo."

Caputo served as the Toronto agent of Montreal's Rizzuto family and was described by the journalists Peter Edwards and Luis Nájera as "among the crėme de la crėme of the greater Toronto area Mafia world". When Vito Rizzuto visited Toronto in the early 2000s, he was always the guest of honor at Caputo's restaurant. When the Musitano brothers were convicted in 2000 in a plea bargain for conspiracy to commit murder with regard to the murder of Carmen Barillaro in 1997, Caputo was supposed to financially support the wife and children of Pasquale "Fat Pat" Musitano while he was in prison. Musitano hated Caputo for not fulfilling his promise to support his family, but Caputo was so close to Rizzuto that he did not dare act on his anger.

In 2001, Caputo was arrested as part of a police investigation into what was described by the journalists Jodee Brown and Ron Wadden as "a Mafia-led illegal gambling ring that yielded more than $200 million in sports bets through Internet links, store-front businesses and high-tech gadgets". On 9 November 2002, the Crown dropped the charges against Caputo as a part of a plea bargain where the leader of the gambling ring, Dario Zanetti, pledged guilty to bookmaking and paid a $300,000 fine. Caputo was close to Pietro Scarcella and upon his recommendation started to work with Nick Nero, a criminal whom Scarcella had met while he was in prison when Nero was released on parole in November 2009. Caputo started to date Tamara Fletcher, the identical twin sister of Tawnya Bel Fletcher, the fiancée of Nero. Caputo was very close to the Toronto gangster Johnny Raposo. In January 2011, Caputo attended the baptism of Raposo's son and told him repeatedly "I love you, bro".

On 11 February 2011, Caputo attended the 50th wedding anniversary party for a senior leader of the Cuntrera-Caruana clan in Vaughan. The party astonished the policemen watching it as it was attended by the senior leaders of both the Calabrian 'Ndrangheta and the Sicilian Mafia despite the bloody gang war raging in Montreal at the time. The police were especially surprised to see Salvatore Calautti, the 'Ndrangheta hitman who was generally believed to have killed Nicolo Rizzuto in 2010 attend the party. The conclusion of the police was that despite the gang war in Montreal that in Toronto the Mafia and 'Ndrangheta factions were determined to work together. Caputo became one of the senior leaders of the Wolfpack Alliance. Edwards and Nájera wrote that Caputo "might be close to the Rizzutos, but he was not about become a martyr for them, especially when the alternative was getting richer through the cocaine trade out of Mexico. If he could enjoy the company of the Rizzuto clan's avowed enemies, he could stomach working with the Wolfpack Alliance-even its bumbling Niagara coke smuggler, Nick Nero". The Wolfpack in turn wanted Caputo to join because of "his impressive connections to the Rizzuto organization in Montreal".

Like the other members of the Wolfpack, Caputo was obsessive in communicating via encrypted texts on the Pretty Good Privacy network. The Wolfpack alliance imported cocaine from the Sinaloa Cartel, whose leader Joaquín "El Chapo" Guzmán was described in their texts as "lil old guy". In his texts, Nero described Caputo as one of the most important cocaine distributors in Canada, writing that he was at the apex of a drug dealing network spreading across the country. In his texts to Caputo, Nero denounced his own agent in Mexico, Alonso Inclima, as he wrote: "Bro what should I do here. I can't believe that fat guy [Inclima]. He thinks he's with the mexis [Sinaloa Cartel]".

=== The Raposo murder ===
In the spring of 2012, a rift developed between Raposo and Caputo. The two men who were supposed best friends, were both having an affair with the same women who worked as a waitress in a Toronto restaurant, whom Edwards and Nájera noted "...was not to be confused with either the mother of Raposo's son or Caputo's moneyed girlfriend". One knew both men very well who did not wish to be identified stated: "He [Caputo] was pretending to be Johnny's friend. He was a conniver. A real conniver...He was a weasel. Who goes and fucks your girlfriend behind your back?" Caputo decided to eliminate his romantic rival and used Nero as a tool, promoting the thesis that Raposo was a police informer. At the same time, a shipment of cocaine worth $5 million from Mexico was supposed to arrive via Chicago in Toronto soon with the profits to be split four ways between Caputo, Nero, Raposo and Robbie Alkhalil. In one text, Caputo assured Nero that the cocaine was not being diluted and there was more than enough time to test the purity of the cocaine, which was a major concern for Nero who lacked the necessary knowledge to test the quality of the cocaine he was buying. Nero admitted in one of his texts to Caputo that he did not know how to test the purity of the cocaine and asked him for his help in teaching him. Nero tended to look up to Caputo as a mentor and to follow his lead. Caputo in his texts to Nero boasted at great length about his sex life and expressed much hatred of Raposo. Caputo also complained to Nero about having to attend Mafia weddings, which he found to be boring.

On 28 April 2012, Nero texted Alkhalil: "We split the load 3 ways. Me u [you] lil guy [Caputo]. The only thing is once we pick them up, we have to get him [Raposo] he is the biggest rat in the world. I told him don’t tell anyone I’m doing this for you but the retard can’t help his bigmouth". It was decided to have Raposo murdered so that Nero, Caputo and Alkhalil could take his share of the profits of the cocaine shipment. On 9 May 2012, Nero reminded Caputo that he needed to text a photograph of Raposo and his address to the hitman who was to kill Raposo. On the same day, Nero reported to Caputo that he was going to have another shipment of cocaine from Mexico smuggled in a private airplane as he wrote: "I'm sending the jet bello, what a mess!!!!! We will kill it!" On 18 May 2012, Caputo texted to Nero the address of the Sicilian Sideway Café, which he described as Raposo's favorite café and the address of Raposo's mother on Crawford Street, writing that he wanted this information sent to the hitman.

On 21 May 2012, Alkhalil offered his favorite hitman, Dean Michael Wiwchar, $100,000 in cash for killing Raposo. When Wiwchar arrived in Toronto from Vancouver on 24 May 2012, he was met by Caputo who gave him Raposo's address and a list of his favorite places such as the Sicilian Sideway Café. Raposo's friend, Alfredo "Fat Freddy" Patriarca, told Caputo that Raposo was going to watch the Ireland vs. Italy Euro Cup football match at the Sicilian Sideway Café on 18 June. On the afternoon of 18 June 2012, Wiwchar shot and killed Raposo at the Sicilian Sidewalk Café in Little Italy. Later on the same day, Caputo arrived at Raposo's house to offer his sympathy to his common-law wife, Monika, and told Raposo's surrogate son, Eduardo Melo Jr. (the son of the boxer Eddie Melo): "Buddy, that's why you've got to stay in school".

The cocaine shipment worth $5 million arrived in a Toronto junkyard, but was stolen by an unknown person before Caputo and Alkhalil received it. The Sinaloa Cartel were furious with the theft of the cocaine, which the Wolfpack had received on consignment, and threatened to send up killers from Mexico to torture and murder all of the Wolfpack for their incompetence in losing $5 million worth of cocaine. The Sinaloa Cartel was especially angry at Caputo, who was supposed to send someone to pick up the cocaine. Caputo fled Canada in the summer of 2012. A warrant for Caputo's arrest was issued in November 2012 as part of Operation Ink 2, an investigation of Nero's drug smuggling network. On 16 February 2013, he was arrested in Cologne while boarding a bus to Poland. The police reported that Caputo was travelling on a forged Italian passport while his lawyer, Greg Lafontaine, insisted that the passport was genuine, saying that Capoto was a dual citizen of Italy and Canada. Caputo was extradited from Germany on 11 April 2013. Caputo did not contest his extradition.

== Convictions ==
On 9 September 2014, Caputo was found guilty of conspiracy to traffic in cocaine, and conspiracy to import cocaine for the benefit of a criminal organization. At his sentencing hearing on 18 October 2014, 43 of Toronto's most successful businessmen submitted letters in favour of a light sentence for Caputo, who was described as an honest businessman who just happened to have some unsavory such as Nero. Caputo was sentenced to 12 years in prison.

On 12 May 2016, Caputo was charged in Montreal with conspiracy to traffic in narcotics as part of Project Clemenza, a police operation against the Rizzuto family. The indictment named Caputo as one of the Rizzuto family leaders alleged to have trafficked in cocaine between 18 February 2011 – 21 December 2011. On 20 March 2017, the Project Clemenza charges against Caputo were stayed after allegations emerged that some of the Crown's evidence such as interpreted cell phone calls had been gathered illegally without warrant by the Royal Canadian Mounted Police.

The trial for Raposo's murder began on 5 April 2017 in Toronto. On 11 May 2017, Caputo was found guilty of first-degree murder. On 12 May 2017, Caputo launched an appeal of the verdict, arguing the four-year delay between his extradition from Germany in 2013 and his conviction in 2017 violated his right to a speedy right under the Charter of Rights and Freedoms. In sentencing Caputo and the others on 27 June 2017, Justice Robert Clark stated: "This conspiracy was motivated by sheer, unbridled and rapacious greed". Clark also rejected the appeal of the verdict. Caputo is currently serving a life sentence for first-degree murder with no chance of parole for 25 years.

== In prison ==
In April 2023, Caputo was ordered to pay $3,748 in monthly child support, spousal support and nanny costs as he serves out his life prison term after he married and artificially impregnated Robyn Amy Louise Hohmeier while serving his sentence at Collins Bay Institution in Kingston. She became pregnant with his child in December 2021, with medical assistance, and after Caputo ended the relationship in February 2022, they entered a court battle where she argued that he made an annual income of $243,531 through real estate investments and sports gambling, even while behind bars. Caputo countered through his lawyer that he makes an annual income of about $50,000 through what he called legal sports betting and a $6.90 a day job as secretary of the Inmate Committee and a prison position called "grocery rep".

On September 3, 2019, Caputo provided his sperm to Hohmeier through a process facilitated by the Chief of Health Services at Collins Bay and she then drove to Toronto to deliver the sperm to a fertility clinic. She also claimed that the two dated between 2009 and 2012 and that she grew closer to him despite his incarceration. Hohmeier claimed that between 2016 and early 2022, when they separated, she travelled regularly to Kingston to visit Caputo, spoke to him on the phone three times a day for extended periods, and had weekly video visits with him. The couple had been married on August 28, 2018, during the second year of his prison term.

== Books ==
- Edwards, Peter; Nájera, Luis (2021). The Wolfpack The Millennial Mobsters Who Brought Chaos and the Cartels to the Canadian Underworld. Toronto: Random House of Canada. ISBN 9780735275409.
