= Dean Michael Wiwchar =

Canadian hitman

Dean Michael Wiwchar (born 1986) is a Canadian hitman currently serving a life sentence for murdering Johnny Raposo in 2012.

== Entry into crime ==
Wiwchar was born in Stouffville into a middle-class family. As a teenager, he was a troublesome student in his high school and a leader of a gang. Wiwchar was often suspended from high school for his violence. In the fall of 2004, Wiwchar went on a series of violent robberies in York Region, robbing and beating people in fast food restaurants, in their homes and in their automobiles. While robbing first a McDonald's and then a Harvey's restaurants, Wiwchar wore a mask and engaged in gratuitous sadism as he beat the restaurant employees with a baseball bat even after he was handed the money in the cash registers. The next day, Wiwchar broke into a house and attacked the homeowner with a knife, and mutilated his face by cutting a giant gash from his ear to his lips. In another incident in a pool hall in Markham, Wiwchar used his knife to stab a man.

In August 2005, Wiwchar was convicted of armed robbery, aggravated assault and assault causing bodily harm. Wiwchar was sentenced to five years in prison on the account of his age as the judge hoped that he was open to rehabilitation, and Wiwchar served his sentence at the Kent and Matsqui prisons in British Columbia. It remains unclear why Wiwchar was sent to British Columbia as normally Canadian prisoners served their sentences in their home provinces. Wiwchar was a violent prisoner who was convicted three times between 2005 and 2009 for assaulting the prison guards. In 2009, when Wiwchar applied for parole, the National Parole Board expressed its concern about Wiwchar's "propensity for violence", his lack of remorse for his crimes and his "unresolved anger issues, impulsivity, thrill-seeking and aggressiveness issues". His parole officer wrote: "For such an young man to have incurred your criminal record and to have been assessed as a maximum security inmate is of concern". The Parole Board noted that while in prison there were "10 instances where you have been in possession of a weapon and at least five instances of assault".

Despite these concerns, Wiwchar was released on parole on 23 April 2009 and ordered to live in a half-way house. In May 2009, Wiwchar was involved in a traffic incident in Maple Ridge while driving drunk and high on marihuana. The automobile that Wiwchar was driving was leased by a man who was wanted for other crimes and found inside the vehicle was a considerable quantity of marihuana and a loaded gun. He broke his leg as a result of the traffic incident and Wiwchar has thereafter walked with a pronounced limp.

Wiwchar's parole was revoked as a result of the Maple Ridge traffic incident and he continued to be a violent prisoner. The fact that there was no discernible motive for his frequent violence against other prisoners and the prison staff other than his sadism gave him the reputation as a terrifying character. Wiwchar used his walker intended to assist with his broken leg as a weapon to assault both other prisoners and the prison staff. During his time in prison, Wiwchar trashed his prison cell and then flooded it by smashing the pipes and was convicted of assaulting a prison guard. Wiwchar was again released on parole in October 2010 despite the statement from the National Parole Board that declared: "You have beaten your victims with a baseball bat, used knives, your fists or improvised by using your walker as a weapon. You remain an untreated violent offender and are assessed as posing a high risk for future violence. You have demonstrated a lack of respect for those in authority, the courts and the criminal justice system". During his five years in prison between 2005 and 2010, Wiwchar was convicted 7 times of assault. As a result, Wiwchar was ordered to provide a DNA sample and was placed under a lifetime weapons ban.

== Wolfpack Hitman ==
Upon his release on parole in 2010, Wiwchar went to work as a hitman for the Alkhalil family and through them the Wolfpack Alliance. Wiwchar usually worked for Robby Alkhalil, who called him "my best hitter". Wiwchar lived in an expensive house at 13380-108th Avenue in Surrey. Wiwchar had no formal job, but the police found inside of his house after his arrest three wigs, two false moustaches, two false beards, two bags of hair, two tins of modelling wax, one tin of gum to fasten false noses to his face and numerous latex face masks. He also owned liquid latex for distorting his face. In an ottoman in his living room, Wiwchar hid a bulletproof vest, handcuffs, 7 handguns, an Uzi submachine gun, two other assault rifles, two shotguns and plus enough ammunition to sustain a lengthy shoot-out. The handguns that Wiwchar owned were a Smith & Wesson, a Ruger, a Colt, a SIG Sauer, a Heckler & Koch, a Taurus and a Norinco. Wiwchar also kept two handguns and a pair of latex gloves in his car in case he needed to kill someone in a hurry. He regarded the lifetime weapons ban placed on him as a joke that he had no intention of ever abiding by. Like other members of the Wolfpack, Wiwchar communicated obsessively via encrypted texts on the Pretty Good Privacy network, where they often wrote frankly about their plans to commit crimes such as murder. As Wiwchar was fond of video games, his Wolfpack codenames were Zelda and WrathOfTitans.

On 17 January 2012, the gangster Sandip "Dip" Duhre was shot dead in the lobby of the Sheraton Wall Centre in downtown Vancouver. The gunman who killed Duhre walked with a pronounced limp.

== The Raposo murder ==
On the afternoon of 21 May 2012, Robby Alkhalil in Montreal texted Wiwchar and offered him $100,000 in cash in exchange for killing another Wolfpack leader, Johnny Raposo, in Toronto. Wiwchar texted Alkhalil back on the same afternoon: "Ice cream boy [Raposo] is getting it[.] k. ya I'm flying there anyway so ill [I'll] bang that one off for ya np [no problem][.] u [you] can have the gat [gun] brought to me in dot [Toronto]? And the pic? Also can u make sure it is a 45 and or 40 cal [caliber gun]? And I will get the ride[.] College Street is heatey [hot, i.e. difficult to operate on] but if I get em [them] inside the shop its ok no noise why are we killing ice cream people? LOL!" Raposo was fond of galateria and his Wolfpack codename was "ice cream boy". Wiwchar knew of Raposo, but he had never met him. Wiwchar did not know nor care why Alkhalil wanted Raposo dead, and was only interested in the money. Alkhalil had likewise had never met Raposo, and had only decided to kill him in response to persistent nagging from another Wolfpack member, Nick Nero, who was convinced that Raposo was a police informer. Wiwchar decided to fly to Toronto and felt that he could not get his guns past the airport security, hence his request to Alkhalil to provide him with a gun in Toronto.

On 24 May 2012, Wiwchar flew to Toronto and stayed at the Fairmount Royal Hotel under his own name. After touring Toronto to see if the police were watching him, he returned to Vancouver on the same day. On 27 May 2012, he flew back to Toronto, again stayed at the Fairmount Royal Hotel, and met with Martino Caputo, the Toronto agent of the Rizzuto family and a senior Wolfpack leader. Using information supplied by Caputo, Wiwchar began to hunt Raposo in his home neighborhood of Bloor West Village. Wiwchar needed to know both Raposo's favorite places and to plan the best escape route after killing him. Wiwchar learned from Caputo that Raposo lived in his house on Willard Avenue with his pregnant common-law wife Monika and their infant son, Johnny Raposo Jr. Wiwchar also learned from Caputo that Raposo's favorite place to spend his afternoons was the Sicilian Sidewalk Café on College Street. Wiwchar was the prime suspect in Duhre's murder and the Toronto police put Wiwchar under surveillance. Wiwchar noticed he was being followed and complained in his texts to Alkhalil about being under police surveillance. During his trips to Toronto, Wiwchar used his automobile rented by Alkhalil.

Wiwchar kept meticulous notes about Raposo, listing his automobile as a BMW sedan, all of his favorite restaurants, his address and even the home address of his mother on Crawford Street. He also drew up a map of Bloor Village West neighborhood that included the best escape routes as Wiwchar worked out how much time it would take to drive down each street after he killed Raposo. On 28 May, Wiwchar checked out of the Fairmount Royal Hotel and checked in at the Four Points by Sheraton hotel as he kept complaining to Alkhalil that the police were following him. In one text to Alkhalil on 29 May 2012, Wiwchar wrote about his desire to have his girlfriend work as a hitwoman, writing: "I like gangster girls who kill[.] that's just what I need[.] I could train her to work with me[.] we could be a team[.] thjink [think] how usefull [useful] a hot girl who dumps people could be[.]why is she a scumbag? She is a snake chick, eh?" Alkhalil texted back: "She goes after guys who r [are] loaded beyonf [beyond] anything u [you] or I have see and uses them to her advantage. I stay away from her. Lol. She owes me 400k. She might bang u and convince u to dump me." On 30 May 2012, Alkhalil texted the Hells Angel Larry Amero: "They [the police] got 10 cars tailing Zelda [Wiwchar] in dot [Toronto]. Something is up". Amero replied: "Not good wonder why". Amero advised Alkhalil to cancel the murder, but Alkhalil refused. Wiwchar flew back to Vancouver on 29 May, saying that the police surveillance was making it too difficult to kill Raposo.

On 9 June 2012, Wiwchar started to text someone who used the internet pseudonym of Princess97 about taking a train to Toronto as he complained that the cameras at the airport were making it too difficult for him to fly to Toronto. Wiwchar did not want to use his laptop to look up on the internet train timetables and wanted "Princess97" to perform that task for him, leading to Princess97 to text him "ur [you are] nuts". Wiwchar texted back: "No I'm not. I'm carfull [careful], dude I was just being followed by a ten car or more surveillance team, of coure [course] they r [are] watching me here. I need to go clap this good and I can't even do it. It's driving me insane LOL!". Later the same day, Wiwchar texted Alkhalil "Sick of this shit. I'm gunna [going to] get a new zapper today for the job and leaves [leave] these ones here and ill [I'll] stay dark and do a few out there before I sow [show] my face again". Wiwchar started to text someone who called themselves Achilles (who may or not have been the same person as Princess97) who advised Wiwchar not to kill Raposo, writing "best to get by be broke than in jail". Wiwchar texted back: "I have to get paid though bro". In his texts, Wiwchar often used the word "goof" as a term of abuse. The journalist Jerry Langton wrote "Although it may sound childish and comical, the word 'goof' is considered perhaps the worse insult" in the Canadian underworld, further noting that: "At least two murders in Kingston [prison] alone since the '80s were reported to be the result of someone calling someone else the G-word". On 11 June 2012, Wiwchar was again advised via text by someone who called themselves "Snootsey" not to kill Raposo, leading Wiwchar to text back: "Contract killing that's my business". On 14 June 2012, Wiwchar flew out to Toronto and checked into the Four Points by Sheraton Hotel under the alias "Michael Frieson".

On 18 June 2012, Wiwchar entered the Sicilian Sidewalk Café in Little Italy dressed as a construction worker while wearing a dust mask and a wig. As Raposo watched the Ireland vs. Italy Euro Cup soccer match being aired on the café's television, Wiwchar shot him four times in the head and once in the neck from behind. Later on the same afternoon, Alkhalil texted Wiwchar: "Time we put u [you] in sniper school I think. this seems too easy for u". Wiwchar texted back: "LOL! I had the whole construction uniform on mullet helment [helmet] dusk mask orange side road shirt and rocker shades lol I sat down and orderd [ordered] a corona".

Wiwchar decided to stay in Toronto for a few more days and visited his grandmother in Stouffville. On Thursday, 21 June 2012, Wiwchar was arrested in Toronto. At the time of his arrest, the police found $5,100 in cash in Wiwchar's wallet and another $40,000 in cash in his luggage. When a police constable told Wiwchar that he was under arrest for first-degree murder, Wiwchar asked: "which one?" On 22 June 2012, Wiwchar's lawyer asked for bail, saying: "It's not like he's some anonymous hitman flown in from BC. He comes from a good Stouffville family with firm roots". Wiwchar, a lean man with cropped hair who stands 6'3 was described as looking more like a university team basketball player than a hitman. The police found inside of the house of Wiwchar's parents in Stouffville the uniform of a construction worker, a hardhat, and $60,000 in cash. On 16 September 2014, Wichchar sued the Crown over the seizure of the gun cache from his house at 13380-108th Avenue, alleging that his rights under the Charter of rights and freedoms had been violated.

== Trial and conviction ==
In 2015, Wiwchar was convicted of the illegal ownership of his gun cache. After being convicted on 3 June 2015, Wiwchar kept smiling in the courtroom. Justice Gregory Bowden noted that Wiwchar's fingerprints were not found on any of the guns, but his fingerprints were found on a London Drugs bag in which the guns were wrapped in, leading him to conclude: "It is reasonable to infer that either Mr. Wiwchar himself placed the London Drugs bag in the ottoman or he was present in suite 1209 when Ley placed it there. In either scenario, it is reasonable to infer that Mr. Wiwchar would have then become aware of the guns in the ottoman".

On 5 April 2017, Wiwchar went on trial for the Raposo murder. On 11 May 2017, Wiwchar was found guilty of first-degree murder and sentenced to life in prison; he "smirked" in the courtroom as the verdict was announced as he seemed to take a perverse pride in being convicted of first-degree murder. Johnny Raposo was a popular gangster and Wiwchar was stabbed by another prisoner shortly after starting his sentence by a friend of Raposo's.

In January 2018, Wiwchar was charged with the murder of Duhre. Wiwchar went on trial in June 2021 alongside Rabih "Robby" Alkhalil and Larry Amero. On 9 March 2022, Wiwchar's trial was severed from those of Alkhalil and Amero.

On October 30, 2025, Wiwchar entered a guilty plea to two counts of conspiracy to commit murder – one for the Duhre slaying on Jan. 17, 2012 and a second for plotting to kill Sukhveer Dhak months later, and was sentenced to 20 years in prison. On December 7, Wiwchar attempted to escape from an exercise yard at the high tech Surrey Pretrial Centre.

The Canadian sociologist James H. Creechan described Wiwchar as typical of the Wolfpack, whose leaders he described as a group of bumbling, grotesquely incompetent men, whom he dubbed as a gang of "wannabe big-time gangsters" who were "involved in something far beyond their level of competence". Creechan wrote: "...the Vancouver hitman, Dean Michael Wiwchar, was being tailed weeks in advance, and yet police wiretaps and his intercepted SMS messages describe how he forged ahead even though he believed he was being watched. His text messages border on paranoid rants about being followed by ten agents, but also reflect a false confidence that he could outwit those who were on his tail. He elaborated complicated travel arrangements to evade the police before executing Raposo, but then he was arrested almost immediately and easily when those same messages indicated that he planned to visit his family home in a Toronto suburb".

== Books ==
- Edwards, Peter; Nájera, Luis (2021). The Wolfpack The Millennial Mobsters Who Brought Chaos and the Cartels to the Canadian Underworld. Toronto: Random House of Canada. ISBN 9780735275409.
- Langton, Jerry (2010). Showdown: How the Outlaws, Hells Angels and Cops Fought for Control of the Streets. Toronto: John Wiley & Sons. ISBN 978-0470678787.
