= Larry Amero =

Canadian outlaw biker and gangster

- Born: Lawrence Ronald Amero; 1977 (age 48–49); Langley, British Columbia, Canada
- Occupations: Outlaw biker; crime boss
- Years active: 2002–
- Known for: Leader of the Wolfpack Alliance
- Allegiance: Hells Angels MC (2005–); Wolfpack Alliance (2010–)
- Convictions: Possession of narcotics for the purpose of trafficking (2002); Conspiracy to commit murder (2022)

Lawrence Ronald Amero (born 1977) is a Canadian outlaw biker and gangster affiliated with the Hells Angels and the Wolfpack Alliance.

== Hells Angels ==
Amero was born and grew up in Langley, British Columbia. He is of Portuguese descent. Amero's father worked as a longshoreman for the Port of Vancouver. At the Port of Vancouver, the British Columbia Maritime Employers' Association does not hire its workers, who are instead hired by the International Longshore and Warehouse Union, with the Employers' Association being merely responsible for training and paying the wages of those workers selected by the union. The International Longshore & Warehouse workers union only hires workers who have been sponsored by a current worker, and in this way Amero was sponsored by his father to work as a longshoreman. As a teenager, he was bullied, which led him to become as journalist Jerry Langton described him "a steroid-fueled behemoth" as an adult. Amero's arms have been massively bulked up, causing him to have an ape-like gait as his arms cannot fall naturally by his side. Amero joined the White Rock chapter of the Hells Angels as a "hang-around" (the lowest level in an outlaw biker club) in 2002 and became a "full patch" member (the highest level in outlaw biker club) in 2005. In December 2002, Amero was found guilty of the possession of narcotics for the purpose of trafficking.

After becoming a "full patch" member, Amero was described as being one of the most powerful members of the White Rock chapter. He has a long record of being arrested, although not convicted on charges of drug trafficking and manufacturing. Amero continued to work as a longshoreman with the Port of Vancouver, despite his membership with the Hells Angels. The Port of Vancouver is controlled by the Hells Angels, who use the port as a conduit for drug smuggling. The port is used to smuggle cocaine, methamphetamine, and heroin into Canada while also being used to smuggle cocaine and methamphetamine into Australia, New Zealand, and Southeast Asia. Superintendent Mike Porteous of the Vancouver police stated in 2014: "Vancouver is an international hub for distribution to Southeast Asia and other countries across the water, where as you know the prices are significantly higher". Andy Smith, the president of the British Columbia Maritime Employers' Association, stated in May 2015 about the employment of Hells Angels at the port: "Yes, we are aware of who they are. They make no secret of it". Besides Amero, other Hells Angels working at the port included Vince Brienza, Norm Krogstad, John Bryce, and Gino Zumpano.

A report by Transport Canada in April 2017 stated that Port of Vancouver is corrupt as the reported concluded: "To facilitate their smuggling activities, OCGs [organized crime groups] are involved in the corruption of port workers, and have embedded members and associates within port facilities by way of legitimate employment... That it is certain that organized crime groups and transnational criminal organizations will continue to exploit vulnerabilities at B.C.’s marine ports to facilitate smuggling both into and out of Canada (emphasis in the original)". Peter Edwards, the crime correspondent of The Toronto Star newspaper, singled out Amero as one of the more notable Hells Angels working at the Port of Vancouver.

Although Amero was a card-carrying member of local 502 of the International Longshore & Warehouse workers union, he was more seen aboard his speedboat Steroids & Silicone than working the docks. Amero seemed to regard his employment as a longshoreman as a part-time job. Canadian journalist Peter Edwards and the Mexican journalist Luis Nájera wrote that Amero "...had the puffed-up muscles of a bodybuilder and carried himself with the casual chic of a Hollywood producer". Amero enjoyed seeking attention by wearing expensive clothing, watches and jewelry. There was a feeling within the White Rock chapter that Amero was too flashy and flamboyant as he attracted too much attention with his ostentatious displays of wealth. Amero owns a house worth $1.13 million Canadian dollars in Surrey and leased three automobiles with his girlfriend, Sarah Trebbe.

Amero's interests were not limited to the Lower Mainland as he frequently travelled across Canada. Amero was the leader of the younger faction of the Hells Angels who were more open to working with other groups. On March 3, 2009, Amero's girlfriend, Sarah Trebble, was charged with being in an automobile where she knew there was a weapon concerning a shooting incident in a strip club parking lot on February 15, 2009. The others in the vehicle were Barzan Tilli-Choli, Aram Ali, and Nicola Cotrell who were charged with the attempted murder of Tyler Willock of the Red Scorpions. Trebbe who works as a realtor in the Lower Mainland was acquitted of the firearms charges on January 27, 2011.

Brad Stephen, a retired officer with the Vancouver police department and an outlaw biker specialist, stated in 2017: "Amero is a formidable member within the Hells Angels and within the underworld in general. He has managed to create alliances with different crime groups and been extremely successful and has made a lot of money in the drug trafficking business."

== The Wolfpack ==
Amero together with Jonathan Bacon of the Red Scorpions along with Randy Naicker and James Riach of the Independent Soldiers were the leaders of the Wolfpack Alliance. Edwards and Nájera wrote that the Wolfpack Alliance was "...a loosely allied and multi-ethnic group of mostly Millennial-aged gangsters who operated across the country". Amero was especially close to Bacon, whom he described as his best friend. Bacon was often seen cruising Burrard Inlet with Amero on the latter's speedboat, Steroids & Silicone. The Wolfpack Alliance, which Amero was the leader of, was a "side project" for him, which are allowed for Hells Angels provided that other members of the chapter are aware of the project and are given a chance to participate. In 2012, Amero left the White Rock chapter to found a new chapter in Langley which he called the West Point chapter, a name that he picked only because it sounded "cool" and had no actual meaning. Amero in common with the other members of the Wolfpack used encrypted texts on the Pretty Good Privacy system to communicate. The Wolfpack worked as distributors of cocaine from the Sinaloa Cartel of Mexico, whose leader was Joaquín Guzmán, better known by his moniker El Chapo ("the shorty").

On October 16, 2010, Gurmit Singh Dhak, the co-boss of the Dhak-Duhre organization, was killed. His younger brother, Sukhveer "Sukh" Dhak, blamed Amero for his brother's murder and vowed revenge. Dhak hired four hitmen, namely Jason Thomas McBride, Jujhar Khun-Khun, Manjinder Hairan, and Michael Jones to wipe out the Wolfpack. On the weekend of August 13–14, 2011, Amero called a summit of the Wolfpack at the Delta Grand Okanagan Resort & Conference Center in Kelowna that was attended by Jonathan Bacon and James Riach. On August 14, 2011, Riach, Amero, and Bacon had brunch at the Delta Grand's restaurant. After brunch, Amero ordered a valet to bring his Porsche to the parking lot. At about 2:45 pm on August 14, 2011, the leaders of the Wolfpack were abroad Amero's white Porsche Cayenne SUV and were leaving the parking lot of the Delta Grand Okanagan Resort when their vehicle was ambushed and shot up by four masked men firing AK-47 assault rifles. Bacon was killed while Amero was wounded. Amero took bullets through his arm and wrist.

Following the Kelowna incident, Amero relocated to Montreal later in August 2011, where he lived as a guest in a luxury condo overlooking the St. Lawrence River with Rabih "Robby" Alkhalil of the Alkhalil family. Montreal is regarded as the most important city in the Canadian underworld as it is a major port city with ocean access, well connected via highways to other cities, and is only 332 miles from New York City, the biggest and richest drug market in North America. Ever since the Prohibition era, there has been a well developed smuggling route running south from Montreal to New York. Amero wanted control of the Montreal underworld as a prelude to entering the New York drug market. Amero lived in Montreal, but visited British Columbia frequently. Amero opened up a luxury car dealership in Montreal while Alkhalil established an haute couture shop in Old Montreal. Amero took to wearing a hoodie reading "Free Quebec", a reference to the Hells Angels arrested in Operation SharQC in April 2009. Despite his choice of attire, he was not especially close to the Hells Angels of the Montreal chapter.

Amero personified the embourgeoisement of the Canadian outlaw bikers as he was the complete antithesis of older outlaw bikers such as Howard Doyle "Pigpen" Berry of Satan's Choice, who was infamous in the 1960s and 1970s for being very filthy and for his disgusting antics such as his obsessive coprophagia. Edwards and Nájera wrote: "Alkhalil and Amero shared a Montreal kitchen that would have done Martha Stewart proud, with its gleaming cherrywood shelving, granite countertops, stainless steel appliances and river view. They kept some of their high-end watches in a cherrywood case. Amero's jeans and Hells Angels vest were perfectly clean and hung neatly on plastic hangers, alongside his Free Quebec gang hoodie and White Rock T-shirts". Amero preferred to drive his luxury Porsche SUV than ride his Harley-Davidson motorcycle as a way of flaunting his wealth. Such embourgeoisement was typical of the Canadian Hells Angels. The Canadian criminologist Steven Schneider noted in 2009 that the popular stereotype of the Canadian Hells Angels as shaggy, disreputable types with long hair and long beards living on the margins of Canadian society is not true and has not been for some time. Schneider described the typical Canadian Hells Angels in the 21st century as well dressed, well trimmed, clean-cut businessmen who drive luxury cars and live in affluent neighborhoods, stating the club now aims to project a 'respectable' image.

Edwards and Nájera wrote Amero and Alkhalil "...tightened up their own connections with Mexican cocaine suppliers" during their time in Montreal. Edwards and Nájera described Alkhalil and Amero as being in charge of a smuggling operation to bring in cocaine from via secret compartments in trucks into the United States. The two principle subordinates of Alkhalil and Amero were Frédéric Lavoie and Timoleaon Psiharis, who bribed truck drivers who worked for bonded trucking companies to smuggle cocaine. The Wolfpack in Montreal were said to have brought in about 400 kilograms of cocaine per month. In a text to Alkhalil, Amero wrote if he "was healed, we would have already drilled back, done this properly" with regard for revenge for the Kelowna attack. On January 17, 2012, Sandip "Dip" Duhre, the co-boss of the Dhak-Duhre group, was murdered at the Sheraton Wall Centre in Vancouver. After Duhre's murder, Alkhalil texted Amero "dips dead” and "Chk the van news this week lol we put this city upside down."

One of the members of the Wolfpack, Nick Nero of Niagara Falls, could not remember his email address and passport to the Pretty Good Privacy network, so he wrote down his email address "Cervezafrya@encryptroid.com" and his password "sharp0" on a yellow sticky note, which was found by the police right next to his cell phone on his kitchen countertop in his girlfriend's Niagara-on-the-Lake condo following Nero's arrest on May 23, 2012. The police were able to decrypt all of the texts sent by the Wolfpack in 2011 and 2012 due to the password unintentionally provided by Nero, including those sent by Amero. In July 2012, Amero was involved in a traffic incident in Montreal and was charged with drunk driving and leaving the scene of an accident. On August 8, 2012, Alkhalil's condo was raided by the Sûreté du Québec and the Service de police de la Ville de Montréal with warrants for the arrest of both Alkhalil and Amero, who had both already fled. Found inside of Alkhalil's condo was a group photograph of the Wolfpack leaders taken in front of Parliament Hill in Ottawa. The fact that Amero, Alkhalil, and Shane "Wheels" Maloney of the West End Gang were in the center indicated that they were the leaders of the group as it is the normal custom in the Canadian underworld for leaders of the gang to be placed in the center of a group photograph.

More trouble for the Wolfpack occurred on August 11, 2012, when a Montreal Wolfpack drug courier, Ricardo Ruffolo, was murdered when answering his door. On September 26, 2012, Lavoie called a meeting in a downtown Montreal bar along with Mihale Leventis and another man who remain unidentified who was working as a police informer. The meeting discussed such matters such as plans to import cocaine from Mexico and Peru.

=== Project Loquace ===
On November 1, 2012, the Sûreté du Québec and the Service de police de la Ville de Montréal as part of Project Loquace arrested 103 members of the Wolfpack in Montreal on the basis of the information obtained via the wire worn by the informer, although Alkhalil escaped arrest and fled to Greece. Amero was one of those arrested as part of Project Loquace on November 1, 2012. He was denied bail and held in a jail in Montreal.

Psiharis escaped to Greece, where his badly maimed and burned corpse was discovered in the Greek countryside on November 20, 2012. Psiharis had been tortured and his face burned off with acid before he was finally killed. His murder remains unsolved. Lavoie fled to Colombia with a forged Bahamian passport, where he worked with a Canadian mixed martial arts fighter and gangster, Steven Skinner, in a drug smuggling ring. On May 11, 2014, the dismembered body of Lavoie was found on a bridge along a footpath named La Vereda Pan de Azucar (Sugar Bread Footpath) outside of Sabaneta. Lavoie had been chopped into four pieces while still alive. The four pieces of what had once been Lavoie had been placed in plastic bags and left on the bridge as a warning. Lavoie's murder likewise remains unsolved. It is believed that both Psiharis and Lavoie were killed to punish them for recruiting a police informer into the Wolfpack. The police have expressed much regret about the murders of Psiharis and Lavoie, believing if those either of those two men had been arrested, it might have been possible to pressure them into turning Crown's evidence, which would have strengthened their case against Amero and the other Wolfpack leaders.

In May 2015, it was revealed that in order to join local 502 of the International Longshore & Warehouse workers union at the Port of Vancouver, an applicant requires a sponsor already working on the waterfront and that Amero from his jail cell in Montreal had been sponsoring other Hells Angels to join local 502. In 2014, Amero sponsored another Hells Angel, Ryan Sept, to work for the Port of Vancouver. Criminologist Rob Gordon of Simon Fraser University told Kim Bolan, the crime correspondent of The Vancouver Sun: "From the union perspective, I'm sure you would find there is a great deal of cronyism going on — that these jobs pass from one hand to another. And as they do so, individuals who are possibly involved in organized crime are passing the jobs on to their buddies, either directly or indirectly." In July 2015, Lindsey Houghton of the Combined Forces Special Enforcement Unit – BC (CFSEU-BC) told journalist Rattan Mall of the Indo-Canadian Voice about the possibility of Amero being granted bail from the Montreal jail he was being held in: “While it’s just one guy [Amero], this could result in a number of different things happening. He’s probably one of the most high profile Hells Angels members in British Columbia in terms of his criminal profile." The charges relating to cocaine smuggling against Amero were dropped on August 31, 2017, when his lawyers persuaded the judge that the Crown had taken too long to bring the case to court.

== Arrest, trial and conviction ==
After being released from jail in Montreal, Amero settled in Ottawa. On January 25, 2018, Amero was arrested in Ottawa and charged with the murders of Sandip Duhre and Sukhveer "Sukh" Dhak. Starting on June 29, 2021, Amero was on trial in Vancouver for the murders of Duhre and Dhak. On August 29, 2022, Amero was convicted of two counts of conspiracy to commit murder in connection to the slayings of Duhre and Dhak. Amero's co-accused Rabih "Robby" Alkhalil was convicted of both conspiracy and first-degree murder in Duhre's death, and was found guilty of plotting to murder Dhak. However, Rabih Alkhali escaped from the North Fraser pre-trial centre before his conviction, but was arrested in Qatar.

== Books ==
- Edwards, Peter; Nájera, Luis (2021). The Wolfpack The Millennial Mobsters Who Brought Chaos and the Cartels to the Canadian Underworld. Toronto: Random House of Canada. ISBN 9780735275409.
- Langton, Jerry (2013). The Notorious Bacon Brothers : inside gang warfare on Vancouver streets. Etobicoke, Ont.: J. Wiley and Sons Canada. ISBN 978-1118388679.
- Schneider, Stephen (2009). Iced: The Story of Organized Crime in Canada (2nd ed.). Toronto: John Wiley & Sons. ISBN 978-0470835005.
