= Nick Nero =

Canadian gangster

- Born: Nicola Nero; 1977 (age 48–49); Niagara Falls, Ontario, Canada
- Occupation: Gangster
- Years active: 2003–2012
- Allegiance: Hells Angels MC (2003–07); Wolfpack Alliance (2010–12)
- Convictions: Robbery of goods over $5,000 (2007); Possession of narcotics for the purpose of trafficking (2007); Possession of narcotics for the purpose of trafficking (2014); Gangsterism (2014); First degree murder (2017)
- Penalty: Life imprisonment

Nicola "Nick" Nero (Italian pronunciation: [niˈkɔːla ˈneːro]; born 1977) is a Canadian criminal gang participant currently serving a life sentence for murder. Nero served as one of the leaders of the Wolfpack Alliance and was briefly one of Canada's largest cocaine smugglers.

== Entry into crime ==
Nero was born in Niagara Falls, Ontario into an Italian-Canadian family. Nero was described by one high school classmate as "dumb as a bag of hair", but very ambitious and full of rage. Nero took to bodybuilding and steroid abuse as a teenager as it was his ambition to become a professional wrestler, whose ring-name was to be "Iron Man". Nero's steroid abuse caused him to have massive muscles and a raspy voice while excessive use of a tanning salon caused his skin to take a peculiar orange tinge. At the age of 18, he spent $3,500 to study professional wrestling at a warehouse in Hamilton.

Nero told the reporter Wade Hemsworth of The Hamilton Spectator that he could bench-press 600 pounds and spoke of his desire to be Canada's greatest professional wrestler. Hemsworth wrote: "He's 5 foot 8, weights 278 pounds and has a chest big enough that you can rest a dinner plate on". He told Hemsworth: "I like bodybuilding, but it was kind of boring. You just go into shows. I want to be an athlete, not just a guy who works out". In 2003, Nero placed 7th in the super-heavyweight division of the Canadian Bodybuilder Federation's championships.

On the night of 11 December 2003, Nero took part in a robbery in Toronto where $3 million in cash were taken from an armored car. The driver of the armored car, Joseph Bruni, was involved in the robbery and opened the back door of the armored car, which allowed Nero and Michele "Mike" Stante to take the bags of cash. Nero was convicted of theft, but his share of the robbery, namely $1 million, was never recovered. Nero used his robbery proceeds to enter the cocaine smuggling business in partnership with a Hells Angel, Zavisa "Zav" Drecic.

In 2007, Nero was arrested while living on bail after the Hells Angel-turned-police informer, David Atwell, recorded Drecic buying GHB, the so-called "date rape" drug while Atwell recorded Nero buying cocaine from him. Nero was convicted in 2007 of trafficking in 9 kilograms of cocaine, 2 kilograms of hashish, 340 oxycodone pills, 200 Viagra pills and 468 liter of GHB on the basis of what Atwell's wire recorded Nero buying from him in 2005 and 2006. The fact that Nero refused the Crown's offers of a plea bargain where he would testify against his Hells Angels associates improved his reputation in the underworld as someone who could be trusted not to turn informer.

After his convictions for drug trafficking and robbery in May 2007, Nero met in prison a Mafiosi, Pietro Scarcella, and went into business with him. Scarcella had been nearly killed by another prisoner who stabbed him half dozen times with a homemade knife in an attempted "jailhouse hit" in April 2007 and he was afraid for his life. Nero, a tall man with bulging muscles served as his bodyguard. Scarcella when he applied for parole in 2007 and 2007 asked to be placed in the Niagara area, which would place him close to Nero.

In 2009, Nero appealed for parole, telling the parole board amid his tears that he was deeply sorry for his crimes as stated: "My life has been destroyed with this, this product [cocaine]. I don't even know how to describe it. This destroyed my family... I chose to profit from something that destroyed my family... I want to pay my debt to society. I want to do my time. I want to go out and I want to raise my family well...Cocaine destroyed my family. There is no need to destroy other families." The parole board agreed to his release, but did not grant him full parole as he wanted as he still refused to return the $1 million stolen in 2003. Nero's parole conditions stated he was not to own a cellphone or a pager; provide his parole officer with a monthly statement of his income and debts; not to associate with anyone with a criminal record; and "refrain from the purchase, possession or consumption of medicines without a prescription". The Canadian journalist Peter Edwards and the Mexican journalist Luis Nájera wrote that Nero immediately went about violating all of his parole conditions after his release on 3 November 2009. A lien was imposed on Nero ordering him to repay the $1 million he had stolen, which he avoided by refusing to take legitimate employment.

== The Wolfpack ==
After his release on day parole in November 2009, Nero started to work with one of Scarcella's associates, Martino Caputo, the Toronto agent for the Rizzuto family of Montreal. Nero's request to join the Mafia was refused under the grounds that he was a "heat score" (slang for a criminal who attracts police attention), but Caputo went into business with him. Edwards and Nájera wrote that Caputo was among the "crėme de la crėme" of Mafiosi in Toronto who had greater authority to act as the Rizzuto family in Montreal was plunged into bloody in-fighting. Caputo joined the Wolfpack because he wanted to buy cocaine from the Sinaloa Cartel directly.

Nero was in charge of smuggling cocaine into the Niagara Peninsula from Buffalo, New York as part of the Wolfpack Alliance. Rabih "Robby" Alkhalil of Montreal recruited Nero into the Wolfpack despite viewing him as being of low intelligence as he felt Nero's connections with the Hells Angels would be useful. The Wolfpack leaders used encrypted texts on the Pretty Good Privacy system to communicate, and wrote frankly about plans to commit crimes. Nero made an average profit of CA$1 million in cash for every 30 kilograms of cocaine he sold, which made him a wealthy man, although he always felt he was not making enough money. His steroid abuse made his moods very volatile and his paranoia and rage issues made him a difficult member of the Wolfpack. Nero had become of the most important cocaine smugglers in Canada, bringing in an average of 400 kilograms of cocaine per week into the Niagara Peninsula via boats and trucks. Despite his profits, Nero still refused to repay the $1 million lien, claiming poverty under the grounds that he was unemployed.

In 2011, Nero had met Tawnya Del Ben Fletcher, a young woman from a wealthy family at a gym in Niagara Falls and started to date her. Fletcher's father owned a popular hotel. In October 2011, Nero became engaged to Fletcher, a much younger woman at the age of 27 with an MBA who turned down admission to a medical school in Australia to live with him. Besides for her MBA, Fletcher was awarded in 2006 an honours Bachelor of Science degree from McGill University. To impress her, Nero traded in his Ferrari F340 for a Ferrari F458 automobile worth $450,000, and later purchased a third car, a Lamborghini Aventador. At the same time, Caputo started to date Tamara Fletcher, the identical twin sister of Tawnya.

Nero lived in a St. Catharines half-way house from Sunday to Thursday and a place of his choosing on Fridays and Saturdays per his parole conditions. While out on his weekend passes Nero lived in a condo in Niagara-on-the-Lake owned by Fletcher, but lied to the parole board by bribing a former girlfriend to say he was living with her in Toronto while he was out on his weekend passes. Nero never admitted his relationship with Fletcher to the parole board, which reflected his tendency to hide as much as possible about what he was doing from the parole board. Fletcher had purchased the lakefront condo in Niagara-on-the-Lake from Caputo's brother, Antonio, in 2011 at a price significantly lower than the market price. Although he did not live in Toronto during his weekend passes as he claimed, Nero frequently visited Toronto in the company of Caputo, where the two men were often seen in the Little Italy neighborhood on College Street.

Nero attracted attention at the half-way house he lived in during 2011–2012 by driving either his Ferrari or Maserati automobiles. As Nero had no job, his choice of transportation was considered very suspicious by the police. Several of the other residents of the half-way house-who were jealous of Nero's way of flaunting his wealth-reported him to the police, saying he was living well beyond the means of an unemployed man. The police took an interest in the way that Nero who lived on welfare drove about his bright red Ferrari F430 automobile, leading one policeman to say of Nero: "It just screamed stupidity. You can't fix stupid". Another policeman noted that Nero modelled himself after the Jimmy "the Gent" Conway character played by Robert De Niro in the 1990 film Goodfellas, saying: "He thinks he's Robert De Niro in the movies". Nero had plans to expand his cocaine distribution business into Europe, developing a network of contacts in Germany and Greece with the aim of becoming Europe's top cocaine distributor. Nero's neighbors in the Niagara-on-the-Lake condo described him as an unfriendly and unpleasant man. The neighbors reported that both Fletcher and Nero "kept to themselves".

The police suspected that Nero did not intend to abide by his parole conditions as he violated his bail conditions. The police started an investigation of Nero dubbed Project Ink. In February 2012, the police seized 110 kilograms of cocaine worth $30 million from a warehouse in St. Catharines, which the police knew belonged to Nero. The police wiretaps of Fletcher's condo that she shared with Nero revealed that Fletcher was the more intelligent of the couple as she tried hard to assist her fiancée with becoming a successful gangster, using her business acumen. The police wiretaps showed that Nero's intelligence level constantly exasperated her. On the evening of 24 April 2012, she was recorded by the police wiretap shouting at her fiancée: "You just waste so much frickin' time and money you know". Nero stated he needed time to discuss matters with the Sinaloa Cartel more, which led her to say "why?" In response Nero stated "I don't understand what's going on". When she suggested that internal theft of cocaine that was so troubling him might be reduced by paying his workers more as she noted that his workers had an annual income of only $30,000—which made stealing his cocaine very tempting—Nero vetoed that suggestion under the grounds it would mean less money for himself. Despite her later claims to only play a passive role in the Wolfpack, the police bugs inside their condo recorded Fletcher and Nero engaged in frequent conversations about how to discover internal theft in the smuggling ring as both were convinced that someone was stealing the cocaine on its way up from Mexico.

At one point, a police bug recorded Fletcher telling Nero: "I don't know how normal people afford life". Nero agreed with her as he expressed his utter contempt for people who lived honestly as "deadbeats" and told Fletcher that she was lucky to be engaged to a gangster who lived dishonestly and committed the "extra special" crimes that allowed her to live the lavish lifestyle that he told her that she deserved. Fletcher agreed with that statement and then started to talk about having children, which she clearly wanted. Fletcher only half-joking stated that any child that Nero might father by her would be a moronic "devil child". In March 2012, Caputo ordered Nero to stop driving his Ferrari and Maserati, saying he was attracting too much attention, forcing Nero to reluctantly drive a 2001 Yukon Denali SUV. Nero, who was very status-conscious, was deeply humiliated by the order, as the police wiretaps recorded Nero cursing his Yukon Denali as a vehicle unworthy of him and expressing the desire to show off by driving either his Ferrari or Maserati again.

One of Nero's Wolfpack associates was a Croat immigrant, Nebojsa Dronjak, the director of a luxury automobile dealership in Port Robinson turned cocaine dealer. Nero was a frequent customer at Dronjak's dealership and joined the Wolfpack after Nero boasted to him about the profits to be made via smuggling cocaine. The friendship between Dronjak and Nero proved to be facile. Dronjak took to taunting Nero via his texts, at one point telling him that a group of Mafia leaders had met in Montreal to discuss him, which clearly aggravated Nero. In one text, Dronjak wrote: "What's the sitdown in mtl [Montreal]? I hear it ruled against you wtf is this Mafia movies now lol!". In response, Nero wrote: "WHAT???" Dronjak replied: "I dunno [don't know] story in the falls [Niagara Falls] that there was a sitdown in mtl little guy [Caputo] went and that it was ruled against you bro???"" Nero was thrown into a state of hysteria by Dronjak's claims, all the more so as Dronjak's story suggested that his mentor Caputo had turned against him, and only finally calmed down when he learned that Dronjak was just teasing him. Despite his claims of friendship, Dronjak seemed to take a sadistic pleasure in telling Nero's misinformation designed to work him up into fear and rage.

In response, Nero texted back to Dronjak: "No [I] wasn't invited. Who ever is talking about me better shut up or I will fucking smash them in the face. Loosers [Losers]!" Nero seemed to think that he was the victim of a plot by drug addict drug dealers. As Dronjak continued to tease him about the supposed Montreal meeting, Nero finally snapped as he texted: "We all responcble [responsible] for our own losses. Real men come forward and say yes I'm responcble [responsible]. They are goofs they own the balance. Simple. They can go to all the sits down they want. I will smash them all I don't care. They doing to so it gets back to coppers. I don't care who they lie to and make themselves look like victims. They know they are wrong. I sat with them. I told them they are responble [responsible] for 27. I will give them work to work it off. They said ok. Now they run for help. I don't care why they cry too [to] wrong is wrong who ever condones this is a goof too! I'm not scared of these junkie goofs. They not like us bro. We are real. U [you] said don't worry bro let' make it back. We are there for eachother [each other]. A real man. They are goofs". The word "goof" is considered to be the worse insult in the Canadian underworld and Nero's use of the word "goof" was meant to disparage his supposed enemies. Edwards and Najera wrote: "There is no bigger insult in the underworld than calling someone a goof. It's a prison term for informers, child molesters and anyone else on the absolute bottom tier of their sharply stratified hierarchy".

Despite his work as a cocaine smuggler, Nero admitted to Fletcher that he did not know how to test the purity of the cocaine he was buying from the Sinaloa Cartel and thus had no idea if he was being cheated. Nero imported cocaine from Mexico that was supposed to be 98% pure, for which he paid a premium price. Nero also told Fletcher he was too afraid to admit to the other Wolfpack members his ignorance of chemistry out of the fear of appearing stupid. The cocaine testers send down to Mexico by Amero and Alkhalil reported that the cocaine that Nero was buying that was supposed to 98% pure was in fact only 38% pure. Nero was recorded telling Fletcher he was very confused about why he had to pay 15% charge on wiring money to Mexico and a 16% charge on receiving money from Mexico, admitting he did not understand, which worked him up to a state of steroid-induced rage as usually happened when he was faced with a situation that was beyond his understanding. Nero had plans to import $2 billion worth of cocaine into Canada per year as he told Fletcher that he wanted to be the biggest cocaine dealer in Canada. Nero constantly accused other members of the Wolfpack and the Sinaloa Cartel of cheating him, making accusations of diluting the cocaine he was buying, which vexed his business partners to no end, all the more so as Nero had no proof for his accusations. Alkhalil accused Nero of gratuitously straining relations with the Sinaloa Cartel and only seemed to tolerate him because he was one of the top drug smugglers in the Niagara Peninsula.

In one of his texts, Nero wrote to the car dealer-turned-drug dealer Alfonso "Al" Inclima on 2 May 2012 that the Air Canada airline was deeply corrupt and it was possible for the Wolfpack to smuggle a shipment of cocaine worth CA$750,000 via Air Canada per week into Toronto. On the same day, Nero received forty-five kilograms of cocaine from Mexico and discovered much to his surprise that 13 kilograms of the shipment were in baking soda and white flour with a minuscule amount of cocaine mixed in. Nero discovered that the Sinaloa Cartel often shipped white bricks designed to look like cocaine as a way to test the competence of the smugglers and much to his fury learned that Sinaloa Cartel would not refund him for the 13 kilograms he paid for that were in fact baking soda. When Inclima indicated that it was possible to smuggle cocaine into Argentina, Nero exploded in rage at him, texting him: "Bro!!! U [you] are suppose to resolve things and get answers and confirm dates. I'm more confused now!!!!!" When Inclima failed to respond, Nero texted him: "What the fuck is the answer bro? Now! What the fuck are you doing there!!! I am still owed pieces. When am I getting them?"

Later on the same day, Nero–after having calmed down–texted Inclima : "Do they have british airways[?] We get 4000 pds [pounds] in uk [United Kingdom] per". The profit from selling cocaine in the United Kingdom were US$64,000 per kilogram, which were double the profits from selling cocaine in Toronto, which made Nero very keen on his British expansion plans. Inclima texted back: "U [you] can move in UK". Inclima reported that some of the crews of British Airways were corrupt and were willing to smuggle cocaine on flights from Toronto to London for Nero while the Sinaloa Cartel had given Nero permission to sell in Great Britain. Nero also wanted to smuggle cocaine into Shanghai and asked Inclima to find some corrupt aircrews flying to Shanghai who were willing to work for him. Nero was in contact via texting with someone who called themselves "Brazil lover" to smuggle cocaine into Rio de Janeiro. However, "Brazil lover" warned him that it would difficult to smuggle cocaine into Rio de Janeiro because of the extra security measures due to the 2016 Summer Olympics, which "Brazil lover" stated had also been the case with Vancouver before and during the 2010 Winter Olympics. Nero was also texting his friend, Mohammed Reza Amin Torabi of Vancouver, a bodybuilder who won the Mr. Canada title twice, about bringing in a shipment of cocaine from Peru via the Port of Vancouver, with 25% of the profits to go to Torabi.

Nero via his texts attacked Inclima for taking his time for having to learn while on the job how to test the purity of the cocaine. Nero planned to sell the more impure cocaine he imported in Toronto, as he stated that most Torontonian drug dealers were lax about testing the cocaine he sold them while he insisted that only the purest cocaine go to Montreal as drug dealers there always tested the quality of the cocaine before buying it. Finally, Nero texted Caputo to ask him to teach how to test the purity of cocaine he was buying. Notably, Nero tended to be submissive in his texts to the Hells Angel Larry Amero and Shane "Wheels" Maloney, the boss of the West End Gang as the Hells Angels control the port of Vancouver while the West End Gang controls the port of Montreal. After Inclima just arrived back from Mexico, Nero immediately ordered him to return to test the cocaine using the knowledge that he acquired from Caputo, leading for Inclima to refuse under the grounds that accusing the Sinaloa Cartel to their faces of fraud was very dangerous, and the authorities would be suspicious if he made too many trips to Mexico over the course of the spring.

Nero had low opinion of Inclima and was recorded by a police bug telling Fletcher: "Al's a fuckin idiot too though. He's just not that cut out for this, he's stupid. He doesn't get anything". Nero told Fletcher that he was going to dispose of Inclima and appoint a new agent for dealing with the Sinaloa Cartel. Fletcher objected to his plans not on moral grounds, but rather on the grounds that would be difficult to find someone with the necessary knowledge of Spanish who could be trusted and was willing to go to Mexico to negotiate with the Sinaloa Cartel. Nero ignored her objections and insisted that Inclima had failed him and needed to go, saying: "He can't go there and speak on my behalf. He's fuckin' retard. I'm more confused now than before he got there". Fletcher told Nero he should trying to speak with his Sinola Cartel contact "Carnalito" directly on the phone, advice that he took. Carnalito sent Nero a text in Spanish, which he had Fletcher translate for him, but he still failed to understand the text. Much to his vexation, Fletcher kept calling him "Piggy" despite his clear dislike of that nickname. By 9 May 2012, Nero was boasting to Alkhalil in his texts he was at the northern end of a vast smuggling nexus running north from Tijuana into Los Angeles and on to Buffalo. Nero also claimed in his texts to have purchased the services of the crew of an Air Canada passenger jet to smuggle cocaine from Mexico into Toronto.

== The Raposo murder ==
In the spring of 2012, a love triangle led to a murder. Caputo together with Johnny Raposo, who were supposed best friends, were both having an affair with the same woman who worked as a waitress in a Toronto restaurant, whom Edwards and Nájera noted "...was not to be confused with either the mother of Raposo's son or Caputo's moneyed girlfriend". One who knew both men very well and did not wish to be identified stated: "He [Caputo] was pretending to be Johnny's friend. He was a conniver. A real conniver... He was a weasel. Who goes and fucks your girlfriend behind your back?" Caputo became jealous of Raposo, and as he wanted the affections of his mistress all to himself, decided that Raposo had to be killed. Caputo used Nero as his instrument for disposing of his romantic rival Raposo. Caputo in his texts to Nero expressed much hatred of Raposo as well as made numerous disparaging remarks about him from April 2012 onward and promoted the thesis that Raposo was an informer. Besides for bragging about his love life, Caputo argued to Nero that because Raposo disliked texting via the Pretty Good Privacy network, and instead preferred to use the telephone that proved he must be an informer.

The Italian-Canadian Nero, who very much wanted to join the Mafia, regarded the Mafiosi Caputo as his mentor and tended to follow his lead. Nero always regarded Caputo as the best man to sponsor him to join the Wolfpack elite. Nero constantly needed encouragement and support from Caputo and on 28 April 2012 texted him: "I could really use a hug from u [you] rite [right] now". Nero complained to Caputo about having to pay a "work tax" to the Musitano brothers of Hamilton, charging that the Musitanos took it as their right to have a share of his profits because he operated in Niagara peninsula without ever doing anything on his behalf. Nero asked Caputo to speak with the Musitano brothers to reduce their "work tax"; unknown to him, "Fat Pat" Musitano was still angry with Caputo for not financially supporting his wife and children while he was in prison. Nero became convinced that Raposo was an informer and starting on 28 April 2012 started to send texts to Alkhalil demanding that Raposo be murdered.

On 28 April, Nero texted Alkhalil: "We split the load 3 ways. Me u [you] lil guy [Caputo]. The only thing is once we pick them up, we have to get him [Raposo] he is the biggest rat in the world. I told him don't tell anyone I'm doing this for you but the retard can't help his bigmouth". Nero believed that a hostile audit of him by the Canada Revenue Agency started that spring was due to Raposo informing on him. The possibility that the audit might have been caused by the fact that he lived on welfare while driving about two luxury Italian sports automobiles seemed never to have occurred to Nero. On 15 May 2012, Nero texted Alkhalil: "Remember he [Raposo] ratted me and lil guy [Caputo] out. That's why he is getting it". Nero had only met Raposo a few times, but was consumed with hatred for him, obsessively sending Alkhalil texts from April 2012 onward demanding that Raposo be killed. Raposo disliked Nero, as he regarded him as an overbearing man full of braggadocio, telling a friend: "He's thinks I'm stupid". In a text to Caputo, Nero wrote: "We're exterminators. We kill surrichii lol" (surrichii is a Sicilian Italian slang term for informers).

Raposo, Nero, Alkhalil and Caputo were planning to bring in a shipment of cocaine from Mexico via Chicago that was worth $5 million with the profits to be split equally four ways. The last three decided to kill Raposo to take his share of the profits for themselves. To assist with the planned murder, on 18 May 2012 Caputo texted to Nero pictures of Raposo together with his address and that of the Sicilian Sidewalk Café (which was Raposo's favorite coffee shop), saying he should pass this information along to Alkhalil's hitman. At the same time, Caputo had attended the baptism of Raposo's son by his common-law wife Monika and told him numerous times "I love you, bro!". Nero requested that Caputo send pictures of Raposo's son from the baptism to the hitman. On 15 May 2012 Alkhalil texted Nero about who he wanted killed, leading the latter to reply that he wanted Raposo and two other men killed. The other two men Nero wanted killed he referred to as "Polish" and "DC". However, Nero's principal concern was having to drive a 2001 Yukon Denali instead of his luxury sports cars as the police wiretaps recorded him frequently cursing his transportation with a typical rant by Nero reading: "Fuck. What's this world coming to? I'm driving a fuckin' 2001 Denali!" The police wiretaps showed that Nero very much wanted to show off his wealth by driving his Ferrari F458 or Maserati GranTurismo automobiles.

On 17 May 2012, Nero sent Alkhalil a text that accused him without evidence of diluting the cocaine he was buying from Montreal. Alkhalil responded the same day by text, where he wrote: "Ur [you're] guys keep accusing my end of stealing and lying. I don't like it. I would never steal. Not even 100 dollars, and my workers know I'd kill their families for doing the same". Alkhalil hinted that if Nero kept making these accusations he would have him killed. On 21 May 2012, Alkhalil offered his favorite hitman, Dean Michael Wiwchar, $100,000 in cash for killing Raposo. Wiwchar who never met Raposo and did not know nor cared why Alkhalil wanted Raposo dead promptly accepted the offer. Wiwchar texted Alkhalil back on the same afternoon: "Ice cream boy [Raposo] is getting it[.] k. ya I'm flying there anyway so ill [I'll] bang that one off for ya np [no problem][.] u [you] can have the gat [gun] brought to me in dot [Toronto]? And the pic? Also can u make sure it is a 45 and or 40 cal [caliber gun]? And I will get the ride[.] College Street is heatey [hot, i.e. difficult to operate on] but if I get em [them] inside the shop its ok no noise why are we killing ice cream people? LOL!"

On 23 May 2012, Nero was arrested at the St. Catharines half-way house without incident as the supposed "tough guy" Nero offered no resistance. The same day that Nero was arrested, Fletcher was also arrested in Niagara-on-the-Lake and charged with narcotic possession for the purpose of trafficking; conspiracy to import narcotics; conspiracy to traffic in narcotics; conspiracy to possess narcotics for the purpose of trafficking; and counselling to commit obstruction of justice. As Nero's parole conditions had forbidden him to own a cellphone, he left his cellphone at Fletcher's condo. At the time of her arrest, she owned two condos, one in Niagara-on-the-Lake and another condo in Yorkville; two luxury sports automobiles; was wearing a $750,000 engagement ring; and had $1 million in cash in the Yorkville condo. At the time of his arrest, Staff Sergeant Joe Maggiolo of the Niagara Regional Police stated about Nero: "He's the mastermind behind the whole operation" Much to Nero's intense fury, the police seized his Lamborghini, Ferrari and Maserati as the proceeds of crime and auctioned off all three automobiles to help pay off his $1 million lien. The status-conscious Nero cried uncontrollably for hours when he learned that he had lost forever his three prized Italian sports cars.

Nero could not remember his email address and passport to the Pretty Good Privacy network, so he wrote his email address "Cervezafrya@encryptroid.com" and his password "sharp0" on a yellow sticky note, which was found by the police right next to his cell phone on the kitchen countertop in Fletcher's Niagara-on-the-Lake condo following his arrest on 23 May 2012. Nero also wrote down his password and email address which was found on another sticky pad note placed next to his laptop computer. The columnist Christie Blatchford noted: "Among the things they [the police] saw and photographed was a sticky note with Nero's email and password, which later let them bypass the data encryption program called PGP. The initials stand for Pretty Good Privacy; alas, when the user thoughtfully provides his secret password on a sticky, it's easily defeated." The Sinaloa Cartel had long had doubts about the competence of the Wolfpack, especially Nero, and decided after his arrest to move into Canada themselves.

On 18 June 2012, Wiwchar entered the Sicilian Sidewalk Café in Little Italy dressed as a construction worker while wearing a dust mask and a wig. As Raposo watched the Ireland vs. Italy Euro Cup soccer match being aired on the café's television, Wiwchar shot him four times in the head and once in the neck from behind. On the same day, Alkhalil texted Wiwchar: "Time we put u [you] in sniper school I think. this seems too easy for u". On 20 February 2013, Nero was charged with first-degree murder in connection with Raposo's slaying.

== Convictions ==
On September 9, 2014, Nero was convicted of drug trafficking, gangsterism and living off the proceeds of crime. Justice John McMahon in sentencing him stated "Mr. Nero made a mockery of our parole system" as he noted that Nero was on parole while he was a Wolfpack member who was importing millions of dollars' worth of cocaine. On 22 September 2014, Fletcher was convicted of drug trafficking and sentenced to two years in prison. In April 2015, Fletcher was granted full parole, as the National Parole Board declared: "You are reported to have been a member of the conspiracy for three months and intercepts indicate you had done mathematical calculations for the drugs and finances of the operation, typed emails and cautioned your fiancée on how not to get caught and that he was getting to be too high a profile... You claim you now understand how you became trapped by the lure of an exciting lifestyle with a 'bad boy' who spoiled you with extravagant gifts, exotic vehicles and high-end properties. You admitted to the Board you turned a blind eye and knew you should have left the relationship, but felt trapped". Because of Fletcher's self-confessed weakness for "bad boys", the Parole Board imposed the condition that she provide them with the names of all the men she might have a "sexual or non-sexual relationship with" while on parole. Mohamed Reza Amin Torabi, the former Mr. Canada bodybuilder and Wolfpack drug smuggler made a plea bargain with the Crown in 2015 where in exchange for a guilty plea he was sentenced to 7 years in prison.

On 5 April 2017, Nero together with Wiwchar, Alkhalil and Caputo went on trial in Toronto for Raposo's murder." At the trial, Nero was defended by Alan Gold, one of Canada's most expensive lawyers. Nero did not testify in his defense. Gold argued that his client was a man too fond of gangster films and together with the other accused were engaged in fantasy role-playing, arguing that the 41,420 texts sent by the accused over a three month period in 2012 were not plans to murder Raposo, but instead merely role-playing. The defense lawyers argued the man responsible for the Raposo murder was a Wolfpack leader, Frédéric Lavoie of Montreal, who had been dismembered into four pieces while still alive in Columbia in 2014 and thus was conveniently unable to defend his reputation. The Crown Attorney Maurice Gillezeau by contrast argued the texts were evidence of a murder plot, noting that Alkhalil was thrown into a state of panic when Wiwchar was arrested on 21 June 2012, which did not support the fantasy role-playing defense. Edwards and Nájera wrote the Crown's evidence in the form of the 41,420 texts sent between April–June 2012 was overwhelming and the texting about murders showed the ultimate ineptitude of the Wolfpack, writing: "It's impossible to imagine old-time Mafioso communicating like this. Even outlaw bikers, with their reputation for wildness, avoid such insane sloppiness. Verbalizing something like that is bad enough, but to text it and commit it to the boundless memory of the Internet?"

On 11 May 2017, Wiwchar, Caputo, Alkhalil and Nero were all found guilty of first-degree murder in Toronto in connection with Raposo's murder in 2012. The accused were all sentenced to life imprisonment with no chance of parole for the next 25 years. As the guilty verdicts were announced, Wiwchar "smirked" in the courtroom as he seemed to take a perverse pride in being found guilty of first-degree murder; Nero looked stunned; Alkhalil showed no emotion; and Caputo kept shaking his head and looking at his family. Justice Robert Clark in sentencing Nero called him an “incorrigible criminal". As Nero was responsible for a murder committed while he was on parole, it is most unlikely that Nero will ever be granted parole again. Nero was attacked in prison by another prisoner who tried to kill him with a home-made knife. The attempt failed, but the one of Nero's eyeballs was ripped out from the socket, leaving him blind in one eye. It is believed that the murder attempt was to punish him for leaving his email address and passport to the Pretty Good Privacy network out in plain view in Fletcher's condo.

== Books ==
- Edwards, Peter; Nájera, Luis (2021). The Wolfpack: The Millennial Mobsters Who Brought Chaos and the Cartels to the Canadian Underworld. Toronto: Random House of Canada. ISBN 9780735275409.
