= Kim Bolan =

Canadian journalist

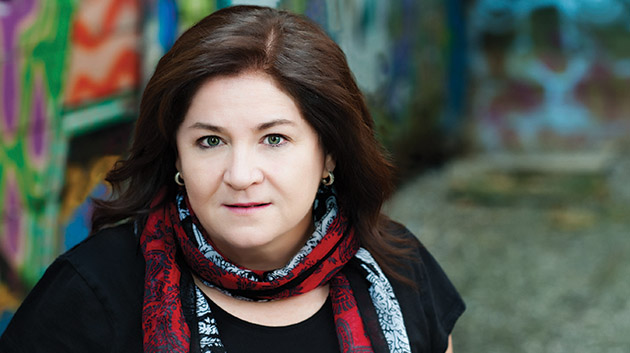

Kim Rosemary Bolan (born 1959) is a Canadian journalist who has been a reporter at the Vancouver Sun since her journalism career began in 1984. She has reported on minority, women's, education, and social services issues; wars in El Salvador, Guatemala and Afghanistan; Sikh extremism, and the bombing and trials related to Air India Flight 182. CBC Radio has also featured her work. On May 4, 2017, while covering a murder trial of a former leader of the UN Gang, Bolan learned that she had been the subject of a murder plot, which she reported on in an article published on May 24, 2017, in the Vancouver Sun.

== Early career ==
Bolan grew up in Courtenay on Vancouver Island. She was a writer in high school, contributing to the Comox District Free Press and she sent stories on the bus to Victoria to be published in the daily Times Colonist newspaper. While attending the University of Victoria she worked as sports editor of The Oak Bay Star.

Bolan then graduated with a Master's degree in journalism from the University of Western Ontario in the 1980s.

== Awards and honours ==
Bolan has won or "been shortlisted for" 15 awards.

Bolan won the Courage in Journalism Award presented by the International Women's Media Foundation in 1999.

In 2000, the Canadian Committee for World Press Freedom (the National Press Club of Canada) presented its 1st Press Freedom Award (1999) to Bolan for continuing her investigations after she was "...threatened with violence and placed under police protection during her investigative reporting on the Air India bombing." Secretary of State David Kilgour presented the award and concluded by saying "Today, in recognition of her strength of character, professionalism and courage to continue in her role as a leading journalist in the face of threats and other forms of extreme intimidation, the National Press Club of Canada is pleased to award the Press Freedom Award to Kim Bolan of the Vancouver Sun."

In 2001, the British Columbia Civil Liberties Association awarded her with the Reg Robson award for her "fearless commitment to freedom of expression". The award is given to honour people who have demonstrated a substantial and long-lasting contribution to civil liberties issues in British Columbia and Canada.

In 2006 PEN Canada presented her with the Paul Kidd Courage Prize.

Reporting on her speech at the Fraser Institute in 2007, The Times of India reported that Bolan still received death threats over her coverage of the 1985 Air India bombing.

== "Political storm" of 2007 ==
In February 2007, Canadian Prime Minister Stephen Harper caused "a political storm" by trying to read part of a Bolan article into the record of the House of Commons of Canada. He was suggesting his Liberal opponents were refusing to extend anti-terrorism measures in order to protect the father-in-law of a Member of Parliament.

== Books ==
Kim Bolan's first book, "Loss of Faith: How the Air-India Bombers Got Away With Murder", was published in 2005.
