= Independent Soldiers =

Criminal street gang based in Vancouver, British Columbia, Canada

- Founded: Early 1990s
- Founders: Manjinder (Robbie) Singh Kandola X; Gerpal (Paul) Singh Dosanjh † & Sukhvinder Singh (Bicky) Dosanjh ‽; Manjit Singh "Mike" Adiwal & Parminder Singh "Peter” Adiwal; Donald Bryce "Donnie" Lyons X
- Founding location: Vancouver, British Columbia
- Years active: Early 1990s - Present
- Territory: Across British Columbia, Alberta, Saskatchewan, Manitoba and Ontario Cities
- Ethnicity: Predominantly Indo-Canadian and various other ethnicities
- Criminal activities: Assassination, Drug trafficking, money laundering, murder, weapon trafficking, illegal gambling, robbery, chop shop, assault, loan sharking, racketeering, extortion, contract killing and kidnapping
- Allies: Brothers Keepers; Hells Angels; Mexican Mafia; Musitano crime family; Punjabi mafia; Redd Alert; Rizzuto crime family; Sinaloa Cartel
- Rivals: Buttar Crime Group; Commisso 'ndrina; Dhak crime group; Duhre crime group; FOB Killers gang(FK gang); Game Tight Soldiers gang; Kang Crime Group(BIBO gang); Luppino crime family; Red Scorpions(2017–present); Renegades Motorcycle Club(Canada); Bloods-affiliated Somalian street gangs; United Nations (gang); White Boy Posse; 856 gang

The Independent Soldiers (otherwise known as the IS gang) is an organized crime group based in British Columbia, Canada that is engaged in organized crime across the nation and in Canadian prisons.

== Origins ==
The Independent Soldiers are a gang, that was said to have been formed by a group of Indo-Canadians from South Vancouver and Metro Vancouver municipalities. ". They had come together during the 1990s under the name "Sunset Boys". The Sunset Boys were a group of mostly Indo-Canadians whose favorite meeting was the Sunset Community Centre and Sunset Park. One of the founding members of the Sunset Boys who later became the leader of the Independent Soldiers was Randy Naicker.

The gang were initially petty criminals, but started to work for the Punjabi mafia in the 1990s as street level drug dealers. As the group chose to assert its independence after the murder of Bindy Johal in 1998, the name Independent Soldiers was chosen as a way to emphasise their independence from the Punjabi mafia. Like most gangs in the Lower Mainland, the members of the Independent Soldiers came mostly from middle-class families, which was not the norm with the rest of Canada. The colors of the Independent Soldiers are red and black. Members of the gang wear red and black clothing in public together the initials I.S. stamped on their jackets and baseball hats. Naicker founded the Independent Soldier clothing brand in 2004. Naicker, an Indo-Fijian immigrant, always insisted that the Independent Soldiers were just a clothing line he had started and that he had nothing to do with crime.

== Rise to prominence ==
The Canadian scholar Mark Totten wrote the Independent Soldiers gang were typical of the gangs in the Lower Mainland which started out as an ethnocentric gang and became more diverse with the passage of time. Totten wrote the Independent Soldiers were mostly a single-generational gang, were not especially territorial and did not have the elaborate rituals that other gangs had. Totten wrote the Independent Soldiers were a mid-level gang in the Lower Mainland, and together with the Red Scorpions and the United Nations gangs are one of the largest gangs in the Vancouver area. Totten noted the Independent Soldiers were an unstable gang with a "fluid" membership and frequent leadership changes. The gang is organized in cells and primarily sells cocaine.

By the early 2000s, the favorite meeting place for the leaders of the Independent Soldiers were the Loft Six nightclub in Gastown. On 16 August 2003, the Independent Soldiers in the Loft Six nightclub were involved in a shoot-out with the Hells Angels on the dance floor sparked by the presence of John "JJ" Johnson, a man associated with the Hells Angels who had beaten up an Independent Soldier earlier that year. One witness recalled: "A fight broke out, and all of the sudden bullets started flying. We just ran. We were right in the line of fire. We couldn't see anybody; we didn't know who was shooting, and people began crawling over top of each other to get out of the way". When the shoot-out was over, 3 people had been killed and 8 were wounded. Johnson was killed alongside Mahmoud Alkhalil of the Independent Soldiers and Jon Popovich, the DJ at the club who was killed in the crossfire. The Independent Soldier Gerpal Singh "Paul" Dosanjh, the first cousin to the Dosanjh brothers, was shot in the head, but survived his wound, albeit with serious brain damage. Dosanjh was murdered in March 2004 while eating at the Gourmet Castle Restaurant in Vancouver.

== Hells Angels puppet gang ==
After the Loft Six incident, many of the original members of the gang ended leaving the gang as it was felt to be too dangerous. The new members who joined the gang were much willing to work for the Hells Angels and the journalist Jerry Langton wrote "...the Independent Soldiers steadily became less and less independent". At the same time, the Independent Soldiers became more multi-ethnic with the influx of new members. The Independent Soldiers were reduced down to being a puppet gang for the Hells Angels. Randy Naicker was one of the pro-Angel leaders of the Independent Soldiers and emerged as a major force within the gang by 2005.

When a puppet gang for the Hells Angels in Prince George known as "the Crew" were broken up by police arrests, the Hells Angels had the Independent Soldiers establish a chapter in Prince George as the replacement puppet gang for "the Crew". The Prince George chapter of the IS were made up of mostly white or First Nations people. The Independent Soldier chapter in Prince George came to dominate the drug trade in that city alongside the Renegades who were also "Hells Angels flunkies", which led to a rivalry with the Game Tight Soldiers. The Game Tight Soldiers disbanded with some joining the Renegades with the rest moving to Winnipeg to join the Rock Machine. The first leader of the gang, Sukhvinder Singh Dosanjh, was killed in an automobile accident in 2005. By 2005, the IS were operating across British Columbia and Alberta.

In January 2005, Randy Naicker along with Harpreet Narwal, Roman Narwal and Sarpreet Johal were charged with the kidnapping and beating of the Lower Mainland businessman Harpreet Singh after he refused to pay extortion money to the Independent Soldiers. On 7 December 2006, Naicker together with Independent Soldier Barry Espadilla were arrested attending a gang meeting at the Castle Fun Park in Abbotsford after a passer-by noticed one of the men had a handgun on him. Also arrested at the Castle Fun Park meeting that evening were Jamie Bacon along with Anton Hooites-Meursing, Justin Prince, Dennis Karbovanec, and Jeff Harvey of the Red Scorpions. The Castle Fun Park meeting was a part of a take-over of the Red Scorpions by the Hells Angels with Bacon acting as their proxy. Langton wrote the Independent Soldiers were "...a gang that had once been all Indian Canadian, but had since become just another Hells Angel puppet club". Both Naicker and Espadilla were representing the Angels at the Castle Fun Park meeting.

== Gang war ==
On 9 August 2007, the Fortune Happiness Restaurant in the Mount Pleasant neighborhood of Vancouver was the scene of a shooting. Two masked gunmen stormed into the Fortune Happiness and opened fire on a group eating at a table. Two men were killed while six were wounded. The well known gangster Hung Van "Sonny" Bui took six bullets in his chest, but survived his wounds. The attack is believed to have been the work of the Independent Soldiers. As the Hells Angels took control the Independent Soldiers, two members, namely Michael Justin Lal and his brother Corey Jason Lal, both left the Independent Soldiers to found their own gang, the Lal crew. The Lal crew were wiped out in the Surrey Six massacre of October 2007.

On 15 April 2008, Joseph "J Money" Krantz, the owner and manager of World Extreme Fighting Club, was arrested by the police. Found inside of his home were 4.5 ounces of cocaine, 2 ounces of heroin, 8.7 ounces of crack, a .380 handgun, a 9mm handgun plus clothing and paraphernalia bearing the logos of the Independent Soldiers and the Hells Angels. It was later confirmed that Krantz was a member of the Independent Soldiers and that his World Extreme Fighting Club was popular with the Independent Soldiers. On 20 October 2008, Krantz was locking the doors of his Extreme Fighting Club in Abbotsford at about 9 pm when he was shot dead. It is believed he was killed out of the fear that he might make a plea bargain with the Crown for a reduced sentence in exchange for testifying against his suppliers. During the ensuring gang war for control of the drug trade in the Lower Mainland, the Independent Soldiers served as proxies for the Hells Angels.

On 6 August 2008, a shooting took place on Upland street in Prince George with a man, known as W.B. due to a court order, being seriously injured. Arrested and charged for the shooting were three Independent Soldiers, namely Jesse Bird, Eric West and Fabian Charlie while another three Independent Soldiers were arrested, but not charged. The fact that the three were who not charged were all white while the three who were charged were all First Nations people became the object of some dispute in the Prince George media. Two of the witnesses to the shooting, Garret McComb and his girlfriend, Brittany Giese, were found murdered inside their house on 7 October 2008, being shot several times. In October 2009, Justice Karen Walker dismissed the charges against West, Bird and Charlie after W.B. refused to testify while she found that the Crown's sole remaining witness to be unreliable.

The leader of the Independent Soldiers, Parminder Singh "Peter" Adiwal was shot several times and badly wounded in an attack by a member of the Red Scorpions gang in April 2009 that left him a paraplegic. In April 2009, Naicker became the new leader of the Independent Soldiers. While in jail following his arrest at the Castle Fun Park meeting, he had a member of the United Nations gang beaten in his cell block. Following his conviction for the assault and kidnapping of Harpreet "Happy" Singh in 2005, Naicker was sentenced to a prison term. Naicker admitted while applying for parole that he was the man behind the Independent Soldiers clothing brand, but he denied being a gangster, saying that his business had been "ruined" when Independent Soldiers gangsters starting wearing his branded clothing without his permission. Naicker was able to make day parole, but the parole board did not accept his claim his claim to be an innocent businessman who was only guilty of only making clothing popular with gangsters, denying him full parole. While Naicker was living at a half-way house in Vancouver as part of his day parole, two armed men burst into the house on 29 September 2009 and stated that they were looking for Naicker who just left accordingly to the sign-out book for a local convenience store. The clerk had mistaken Naicker for Raj Soomel. The two gunmen raced over to the convenience store and shot Soomel dead out of the belief that he was Naicker.

Ken Yaretz was a drug dealer in Kamloops who during a police stop in August 2008 had been found inside of the car of Jayme Russell, the president of the Kamloops chapter of the Independent Soldiers. Yaretz together with his best friend Damien Marks had just moved into a new basement apartment when both men went missing on 17 April 2009. In May 2009, the corpses of Marks and Yaretz were found buried on grounds of the house at Knouff Lake owned by Roy Fraser. It was stated by locals that it was "common knowledge" that Fraser was a drug dealer whose remote house had a marijuana grow-opt owned by the Hells Angels. Fraser was charged with murder, but fled while on bail. On 14 December 2013, Fraser was convicted of one count of first degree murder in regard to Yaretz's death and one count of second degree murder in regard to Marks's death.

Brittney Irving of Kelowna was a 24-year old healthcare professional who was addicted to Oxycontin. To pay for her addiction, she worked as a marijuana dealer for both the local chapters of the Independent Soldiers and the Hells Angels. On 6 April 2010, she went to meet an Independent Soldier drug dealer, Joelon "Joey" Verma and vanished. Her corpse was discovered by the police on 25 May 2010. During the police investigation of Irving's murder, Verma rammed a gun into the belly of another man, Mike Roberts, and told him: "You have to take the fall for this [Irving murder]...If you don't I have no choice but to kill you, your wife, your children and your grandchildren. I'm sorry, that's just how we do business." Verma was charged with her murder. On 17 October 2013, Verma was convicted of Irving's murder and was sentenced to 25 years in prison with no chance of parole. Verma broke down hysterically in tears as the guilty verdict was announced in the courtroom.

After Russell was arrested, the new president of the Independent Soldier Kamloops chapter was Jeffery Oldford. Oldford had been convicted of theft in April 2010 while also facing charges of sexual assault laid in December 2010 and another for trafficking in April 2011. On 5 August 2011, a group of men armed with guns and baseball bats broke into the house of a small-time drug dealer Steve Bodie. Bodie was robbed and beaten bloody with the bones in his chest, hands and fingers all being broken. Bodie was dumped by a highway in the Rocky Mountains and finally had one of his hands run over by a truck. After Bodie went to a farmhouse to report the attack, the police entered Bodie's house and found two Independent Soldiers looking for drugs. The police charged Oldford together with Adam Colligen, Brett Haynes, Greg Brotzel and David Byford of the Independent Soldiers' Kamloops chapter.

== The Wolfpack Alliance ==
In 2010, Naicker together with another Independent Soldier, James Riarch, became a founding member of the Wolfpack Alliance alongside Larry Amero of the Hells Angels and Jonathan Bacon of the Red Scorpions. On 16 October 2010, Gurmit Singh Dhak, the co-boss of the Dhak-Duhre group was murdered with his corpse being found in his BMW automobile in the parking lot of the Metrotown Mall in Burnaby. The cause of Dhak's death was being shot in the face. Kim Bolan, the crime correspondent of The Vancouver Sun newspaper wrote in 2018: "Dhak's execution was the flashpoint for a near decade-long war that has raged across the province and left many dead and wounded in its wake. Few of those behind the violence have been held to account."

Suhhveer "Sukh" Dhak, the younger brother of Gurmit, believed that the Wolfpack gang and that Amero and Bacon in particular were the ones responsible for his brother's murder. Amero had called a summit of the Wolfpack leaders at the Grand Delta Okanagan Resort and Hotel in Kelowna for the weekend of 13–14 August 2011 that was attended by Bacon and Riarch. Amero, Bacon and Riach had a brunch at the Grand Delta on 14 August and had decided to leave via Amero's Porsche. Amero was driving with Bacon besides him in the passenger seat and Riach in a rear seat together with two women Leach Hadden-Watts and Lyndsey Black. At about 2: 45 pm on 14 August 2011, Amero's Porsche Cayenne was leaving the parking lot of the Delta Grand Hotel, when a group of four masked gunmen opened fire with AK-47 assault rifles. The gunmen fired at least 30 shots into the Cayenne, killing Bacon, wounding Amero, and leaving a 21-year waitress, Leah Hadden-Watts, a quadriplegic as she took a bullet straight through her neck, severing her spinal cord. Black took two bullets through both her thighs, but unlike Hadden-Watts, she was able to walk again. Riarch fled from the scene, bleeding and in panic. Riarch ended up going to the Philippines under the grounds that Canada was too dangerous for him. Despite fleeing Canada, Riarch was promoted up from the Independent Soldiers to join the Hells Angels.

On 17 January 2012, Sandip "Dip" Duhre, the co-boss of the Dhak-Duhre group was shot dead while leaving a Vancouver hotel in a revenge attack for the Delta Grand Hotel incident. Two hitmen from the Dhak-Duhre organization were able to enter the underground parking lot of the apartment complex that Naicker lived via an access fob and placed a GPS tracking device on the bottom of Naicker's car. On 25 June 2012, Naicker was shot dead outside of a Starbucks in Port Moody. His killers were from the rival Dhak-Duhre group who following him via the GPS device and were waiting for a moment to get a clear shot at him. As Naicker left the Starbucks, the killers who were waiting outside shot him dead and then jumped into a SUV parked outside of the Starbucks to flee the scene. On 19 November 2012, Suhhveer "Sukh" Dhak and his bodyguard Thomas Mantel were murdered in Vancouver.

In January 2014, Riarch was arrested in the Philippines on charges of smuggling drugs into the Philippines from Mexico. An Independent Soldier and Wolfpack member, Sukhvir Singh Deo moved to Toronto to escape the hitmen of the Dhak-Duhre group, but remained active in smuggling cocaine, causing tensions with the Musitano family of Hamilton, who saw him as an intruding on their own territory. In March 2014, Deo was arrested for smuggling cocaine, but was able to post bail. After posting bail, Deo went into hiding. On 23 May 2016, Deo made the news when he was attended a Toronto Raptors basketball game and started to abuse the referees for supposedly favoring the Cleveland Cavaliers so violently that he was ejected from the Rogers Center. Deo's abuse of the referees led to several YouTube videos being made about him as an example of an obnoxious Toronto Raptors fan. On 7 June 2016, Deo was murdered in Toronto by two killers disguised as construction workers. Deo had parked his automobile in the alley known locally as Cowbell Lane at the corner of Yonge Street and Eglinton Avenue and seemed to be waiting for someone. Two men dressed as construction workers appeared to be deep in conversation as they walked down Cowbell Lane and then suddenly opened fire on Deo, putting 14 bullets into him. It is believed that the YouTube videos and news clips had drawn the attention of Deo's enemies. It remains unclear if his murder was work of the Musitano family or the Dhak-Duhre group. Deo's murder made the headlines of newspapers in his native India with The Times of India for example making his murder frontpage news under the headline "A Gangster and a NBA Fan".

In 2018, Riach was convicted of drug trafficking in the Philippines and sentenced to life imprisonment. Since 29 June 2021, Amerco and another Wolfpack leader Rabih "Robby" Alkhalil have been on trial in Vancouver for the murders of Sandip Duhre and Suhhveer Dhak with the Crown alleging the two hired the hitman Dean Michael Wiwchar to kill Dhak and Duhre. On 11 May 2017, Alkhalil and Wiwchar were both convicted of first-degree murder for the 2012 murder of Toronto gangster Johnny Raposo. In July 2022, Alkhalil escaped from the North Fraser Pretrial Center jail and is now a free man.

== Timeline of noteworthy events ==
- December 2007 - In Prince George, the leader of the local chapter of the Independent Soldiers was arrested on suspicion of murder following a gang-related shooting in that city.
- August 2011 - An Independent Soldier member in James Riach was in a vehicle with known Hells Angels and Red Scorpion gang members that had been targeted by rival gangs in a brazen, broad daylight shooting outside the Delta Grand Okanagan Resort hotel in Kelowna.
- 2013 to present - There have been multiple arrests and seizing of property by police of alleged IS members from the Okanagan region of BC and Alberta.

== See also ==
- 2009 Vancouver gang war

== Books ==
- Edwards, Peter; Nájera, Luis (2021). The Wolfpack The Millennial Mobsters Who Brought Chaos and the Cartels to the Canadian Underworl. Toronto: Random House of Canada. ISBN 9780735275409.
- Langton, Jerry (2013). The Notorious Bacon Brothers : inside gang warfare on Vancouver streets. Etobicoke, Ont.: J. Wiley and Sons Canada. ISBN 978-1118388679.
- Totten, Mark (2012). Nasty, Brutish, and Short The Lives of Gang Members in Canada. Toronto: James Lorimer Publishers. ISBN 9781459400399.
