= Anton Hooites-Meursing =

Canadian gangster and criminal

Anton Brad Kornelius Hooites-Meursing (born 1971) is a Canadian former gangster who was a senior member of the Red Scorpions gang of Vancouver before turning Crown's evidence.

== "Throw-away kid" ==
Hooites-Meursing was born in Calgary to a Canadian father and an Australian mother. At a very young age, his family moved to Australia and then when he was 8 years old relocated to the United States. Hooites-Meursing described his mother as a mentally ill woman who frequently beat him while his father was a violent, angry man who likewise beat his children. Hooites-Meursing spent the rest of his youth in Los Angeles. His parents divorced and Hooites-Meursing was assigned to the custody of his mother. When was 11 years old, he came home from school to find that his mother had abandoned him as she left him a note saying that she did not want to see him ever again and he was now on his own. Hooites-Meursing was placed "in care" at a foster home. As a "throw-away kid", Hooites-Meursing found himself growing alone.

Hooites-Meursing lived in Compton, a mostly black city where as a white youth Hooites-Meursing claims to have been the victim of racial abuse from the black majority. He dropped out of school in grade 9 and joined a mostly Hispanic gang. Hooites-Meursing told the journalist Jerry Langton in an interview: "I had no love or anything close at home, but rather was hated by my family and my dad especially. So it was, as I look back, a natural seeking out of acceptance and love which was mine to be had by joining a Mexican gang". At the age of 17, Hooites-Meursing returned home to find his apartment looted and his best friend/roommate murdered. As a teenager, Hooites-Meursing was frequently arrested and he recalled that his teenage years were "a decade of gladiator school in the Los Angeles county jail system, which for anybody that is white is a total nightmare".

== The Red Scorpions ==
At the age of 29, Hooites-Meursing was deported to Canada on 7 December 2000. Hooites-Meursing had left Canada at a very young age and he barely knew the country. He initially lived homeless on the Downtown Eastside of Vancouver, an area notorious as one of the worse neighborhoods in Canada. Hooites-Meursing was able to find employment at the British Columbia Automobile Association and at a Home Depot store. He rented an apartment in New Westminster and despite being deported, would illegally visit his girlfriend in Los Angeles. Once his girlfriend left him for another man, he became depressed and suicidal. Hooites-Meursing stated to engage in substance abuse to combat his depression, which caused him financial problems as he spent most of his income on drugs. To pay for his drug habits, Hooites-Meursing re-entered the gangster lifestyle. Hooites-Meursing used his connections with Los Angeles gangs to broker deals under which cocaine, guns and ammunition were smuggled into Canada in exchange for marihuana, especially the B.C. Bud strain, were smuggled into the United States. Langton wrote that the highly prized super-potent B.C. Bud strain of marihuana "was like gold in the United States", and that American gangsters were keen to have a reliable source of the B.C. Bud marihuana in Canada, which made Hooites-Meursing into an important conduit between the underworlds of Vancouver and Los Angeles. Through his connections with the Los Angeles Chicano gangs he once belonged to, Hooites-Meursing opened a smuggling pipeline under which cocaine was smuggled from Mexico to Canada via the United States.

Attracted by the wealth of the underworld, Hooites-Meursing became a drug dealer himself. He embraced the standard look and accessories of a Lower Mainland gangster, namely he drove expensive automobiles; dressed in a loud, fleshly style; had his entire body covered with tattoos, and carried around a gun at all times. Hooites-Meursing also started smuggling cocaine into Australia via customized compartments in his briefcases. Cocaine is sold for much higher prices in Australia than in North America and his Australian trips were highly profitable. Like many gangsters, Hooites-Meursing engaged in steroid abuse to bulk up his muscles and he became violent as a result of his excessive steroid abuse. His specialty was in robbing rival gangsters whom he would overpower with his huge muscles and street-fighting skills learned in Los Angeles to take their drugs, guns and watches. Besides for steroids, Hooites-Meursing became addicted to the Oxycontin pain killer drug smuggled in from the United States. Hooites-Meursing's nicknames were Compton and Blanco (Spanish for "Whitey", which was the nickname Hooites-Meursing was known by in Los Angeles). Dustin Riske, a man who knew Hooites-Meursing-described him as a" dangerous – a loose cannon who carried a gun with him everywhere he went and was known to shoot it off in the streets".

Hooites-Meursing joined the Red Scorpions gang and became one of their most important members owing to his connections with Los Angeles gangs, which allowed him to smuggle guns and ammunition into Canada on a massive scale. Hooites-Meursing stood out in the Red Scorpions as he came from a dysfunctional family. Most of the Red Scorpions like other gangsters in the Lower Mainland tended to come from middle-class families with loving parents. Gangsters in the Lower Mainland usually come from functional middle-class families, which was not the norm in the rest of Canada where the gangsters tended to come from working class families and broken homes. Hooites-Meursing was asked to kill a street level drug dealer, Randy McLeod, who was competing with the Red Scorpions. On 13 June 2001, Hooites-Meursing overpowered McLeod in the parking lot of a Canadian Tire store in Surrey and threw him into a van. Hooites-Meursing then drove to McLeod's house, which he proceeded to loot, stealing $10,000 in cash along with McLeod's cocaine and heroin. Angry that McLeod did not have more money and drugs in his house, Hooites-Meursing went back into the van and proceeded to beat McLeod, punching and kicking him in the face. The van was driven to the U.S-Canadian border, where Hooites-Meursing strangled MeLeod to death. McLeod's decomposing corpse was found eleven days in a forest just north of the 49th parallel with a black nylon strap still around his neck. Rus On 22 December 2002, Hooites-Meursing was involved in a notably bloody brawl fought with broken beer bottles on the floor of the Luxor nightclub in Abbotsford against members of the rival United Nations (UN) gang. After being expelled from the Luxor, the brawl continued in the parking lot and ended with Hooites-Meursing using his knife to stab two UN gang members, BonLeuth Thiphavong and his younger brother Souskavath Thiphavong. Souskavath Thiphavong died of his wounds later that night. In January 2003, the UN gang shot and killed the Red Scorpion Edward "Skeeter" Russell in revenge. When a tape emerged of an UN gang member, Gupreet "Bobby" Rehal, laughing about the killing of Russell and stating he arranged for the murder, the Red Scorpions decided that he must had been Russell's shooter. On 13 March 2003, Hooites-Meursing drove a gunman who cannot be named because he was underage at the time, who knocked on the door of the middle-class Rehal house in Abbotsford and shot the 19-year-old Rehal in the face at close range when he opened the door. Rehal died of a massive head trauma from multiple shots to the chest and head, the next morning at the Royal Columbian Hospital.

One of the Red Scorpion leaders, John Lahn, felt that Hooites-Meursing was too violent and unpredictable owing to his steroid abuse. At a party in Victoria, someone told a joke at Hooites-Meursing's expense, causing everyone to laugh at him. Enraged, Hooites-Meursing assaulted the man and forced a gun into his mouth before he was persuaded to put it away. Lahn decided to fire Hooites-Meursing over the incident and at a meeting on 21 October 2003 in the parking lot of a strip mall in Burnaby informed Hooites-Meursing that he was now out of the gang. A fight broke out, which ended with Hooites-Meursing shooting and killing Lahn. Hooites-Meursing was charged with murder, but he claimed self-defense. On 2 November 2006, Justice Mary Humphries dismissed the murder charges against Hooites-Meuring for Lahn's death.

On 7 December 2006, Hooites-Meursing was present at a gangland meeting in the Castle Fun Park in Abbotsford where he engaged in discussions with Randy Naicker and Barry Espadilla of the Independent Soldiers along with Jamie Bacon of the Bacon brothers. The meeting was broken up when a passer-by noticed that one of the men had a gun and called the police who arrested all of the assembled men. During the gang war in Vancouver in 2008 and 2009 fought between the Red Scorpions and the United Nations gang for the control of the cocaine trade, Kim Bolan, the crime correspondent of The Vancouver Sun newspaper, maintained a blog about crimes in the Lower Mainland. Rival gangsters posted insults against each other in the comments section of Bolan's blog and made coded references to the crimes they had committed. A prolific contributor of comments to Bolan's blog was Hooites-Meursing who ended up revealing much about his criminal activities in his various comments. Once Bolan discovered the identity behind Hooites-Meursing account, she engaged in an email correspondence where he wrote frankly about the Vancouver underworld and revealed that he was co-operating with the police as he decided to turn Crown's evidence as he wished to leave the underworld. Bolan described Hooites-Meursing as an "admitted killer", but wrote that he was an invaluable source for her stories as he knew much about the workings of the underworld.

== Turning Crown's evidence ==
In April 2010, Hooites-Meursing in an email told Bolan that he made a plea bargain with the Crown in exchange for a lesser sentence. When Bolan asked for permission to use his emails as the basis of a story, he wrote back: "Yeah, I'm at peace with all of this. You can use anything I've told you over the last ten months". Bolan published a scoop, a two-paper feature in The Vancouver Sun, covering Hooites-Meursing's life story and his plea bargain that was based on the 65,000 total words in his various emails in 2009 and 2010.

On 13 April 2010, Hooites-Meursing pleaded guilty to two counts of first-degree murder and was sentenced to 25 years in prison. As part of his plea bargain with the Crown, he did not receive a life sentence as would normally be the case with two convictions for first-degree murder and he agreed to testify against those responsible for the Surrey Six massacre of 2007. Eileen Mohan, whose son Chris was executed as an inconvenient witness to the massacre, stated: "It takes a lot of courage for someone to come out and admit his guilt and be accountable". Hooites-Meursing pleaded guilty to the murders of Rehal and McLeod in exchange for the Crown dropping the charges against him for the other killings he committed. Corporal Dale Carr of the Royal Canadian Mounted Police stated: "Knowing full well the jeopardy he was facing was with life in prison, Hooites-Meursing came forward to investigators on his own. The information he provided resulted in charges being laid; he has now answered guilty to those charges. These murders have direct links to drugs, gangs and organized crime".

== Books ==
- Richardson, Chris; Smith Fullerton, Romayne (2016). "The People's Servant: Vancouver Sun Crime Reporter Kim Bolan's Breakthrough Blogging". In Chris Richardson & Romayne Smith Fullerton (ed.). Covering Canadian Crime What Journalists Should Know and the Public Should Question. Toronto: University of Toronto Press. pp. 245–250. ISBN 9781442631038.
- Langton, Jerry (2013). The Notorious Bacon Brothers Inside Gang Warfare on Vancouver Streets. Toronto: John Wiley and Sons. ISBN 9781118404577.
