= Punjab Control of Organised Crime Act =

- Status: Unknown

The Punjab Control of Organised Crime Act (PCOCA) is a proposed law to be enacted by Punjab state in India to combat organised crime. It is in process of approval as the Punjab Cabinet has yet not given its approval on account of few reservations about various clauses of the act. The act is designed on the pattern of Maharashtra Control of Organised Crime Act, 1999.

== See also ==
- Indo-Canadian organized crime
- Organised crime in India
