= 2009 Vancouver gang war =

Period of intense gang violence in Vancouver

Vancouver gangs war
| Date | 2009 - 2010 |
| Location | Vancouver |

Belligerents
| Independent Soldiers, Sanghera family, Alkhalil family, Brothers Keepers | Red Scorpions, Hells Angels, Bacon family | United Nations, Buttar family | Wolfpack Alliance |

In early 2009, a series of gang-related shootings occurred due to what police describe as a gang war in Vancouver, British Columbia, Canada. Alleged participants include the Independent Soldiers, the Sanghera Crime Family, the Buttar Crime Family, the United Nations Gang, the Red Scorpions, and the Vancouver chapters of the Hells Angels.

== Background ==
The escalation of gang violence in Vancouver, beginning in January 2009, is alleged to have been caused by disruptions to the supply of illegal drugs resulting from the crackdown by the Mexican government against the drug cartels there, who supplied cocaine to British Columbia in return for marijuana. This reduced the profits of the Independent Soldiers (IS) and their sometime allies the United Nations gang. The IS are primarily an Indo-Canadian gang while the United Nations gang is made of a multitude of different ethnic groups. More recently, Chinese and Guatemalans and other various nationalities have been recruited. Both of these gangs' main modus operandi is gun running and smuggling marijuana known as BC Bud to the United States.

The cocaine trade became very profitable due to the ongoing Mexican drug war. The Mexican Army has severely curtailed the ability of the Mexican drug cartels to move cocaine inside the U.S. and Canada. The U.S. government says the amount of cocaine seized on U.S. soil dropped by 41 percent between early 2007 and mid-2008 and claims this is due to this pressure. The price in Vancouver has increased from $23,300 to almost $39,000 a kilo.

The cocaine trade has been the domain of the IS and UN's rival Red Scorpion street gang and the Hells Angels biker gang. As the IS and UN gangs moved in, the Red Scorpions hit back leading to an all out gang war.

The police response to the gang war was greatly hindered by the perception that the police forces in the Lower Mainland were grossly inept, which made people unwilling to come forward with information, which was the legacy of the Pickton case. The serial killer Robert Pickton had murdered 49 women, and the police failed to recognize ample evidence that Pickton was the killer in the 1990s. In March 1997, the police received a report from one woman who was bleeding badly from multiple stab wounds that Pickton had tried to murder her at his pig farm, which the police just dismissed as the ramblings of a drug addict. Likewise, another report in 1999 that Pickton had a freezer full of human flesh in his house was dismissed by the police as more ramblings from another drug addict. Pickton was finally arrested in 2002, but the way that the police had ignored the evidence that Pickton was a serial killer gave police forces in the Lower Mainland a reputation for being extremely incompetent and callous, which made ordinary people unwilling to risk their lives to come forward with information during the gang war.

== Progress and escalation ==
By the end of the first quarter of 2009, more than 20 people had been killed and 40 wounded. The Hells Angels had primarily stayed out of the fighting up to this point while the IS gang was busy trying to protect its turf from the resurgent Buttar Gang after police in April 2009 functionally dismantled the rival Sanghera Crime Group after a series of arrests which created a vacuum allowing the Buttar gang to expand its operations and encroaching on the IS for its marijuana monopoly.

Most of the wounded and killed had been members of the Red Scorpions and UN gangs who were engaged in a brutal tit-for-tat turf war. The carnage between the UN and the Red Scorpions was believed to have started with the Surrey Six massacre in October 2007. Dozens of other slayings followed, many of them retribution killings and commercial disputes between the UN and the associated members of the Red Scorpions, the Bacon brothers who used to be members of the UN gang. But the conflict between these gangs escalated dramatically after the UN gang along with the IS gang decided to move into the cocaine trade, a long domain of the Red Scorpion gang. Despite the name, the conflict actually started in late 2007. On 8 September 2007 while celebrating a birthday party at the posh Quattro on Fourth restaurant in Kitsilano, two masked gunmen marched up to the window and opened fire at the table where Gurmit Singh Dhak, the co-boss of the Dhak-Duhre group, and his 21-year-old girlfriend were sitting. Both Dhak and his girlfriend were wounded in the shooting and had to be taken to the hospital. The attack is believed to have been the work of the Independent Soldiers. Dhak was not a member of the UN gang, but the Dhak-Duhre group was allied to the UN gang.

Joushua Hedrick had a been of a Hells Angels puppet gang, known as "the Crew", in Prince George, but had moved in with his mother in Maple Ridge in an attempt to get away from the gangster lifestyle. On 11 January 2009, Hedrick vanished with his decomposing corpse being discovered in the Fraser river near Douglas island in Port Coquitlam in August 2009. On 20 January 2009, a murder attempt was made against Jamie Bacon. Bacon was driving his black Mercedes-Benz SL55 convertible on the South Fraser Way when a SUV pulled alongside him after he stopped for a red light and a group of gunmen opened fire on him. Bacon sped away, leading to a wild car chase that ended with Bacon crashing his way into a Keg restaurant. On 27 January 2009, Andrew "Drew" Cilliers, a 'respectable' and well liked businessman who also worked as a drug dealer for the Hells Angels, was shot on his driveway of his house shortly after midnight on 27 January 2009. Cilliers died on the way to the hospital.

After learning that Jonathan Bacon had moved into a condo at 651 Nootka Way in Port Moody, on 3 February 2009, the Port Moody police warned in a public statement that to associate with any of the three Bacon brothers was to put one's life in danger. The journalist Jerry Langton wrote: "Not surprisingly, the Port Moody warning didn't work. If anything, it only made the gangsta-wannabe kids in the Lower Mainland admire the Bacon Brothers even more. The boys had proved they were not just untouchable by law enforcement, but also by their enemies....Their lives were like the twisted fantasies of a bored 12-year old. The warning only put an official stamp on it". Later on the same day of the Port Moody warning, an associate of the brothers, Raphael Baldini was gunned down in Surrey as he was talking on his cellphone while sitting in his car in the parking lot of the Guildford Town Center. People in the Lower Mainland flooded social media sites with praise and tributes for Baldini. Jourdane Lal, the sister of the two Lal brothers killed in the Surrey Six massacre, praised Baldini in a public Facebook post, writing: "no words can explain how our family will miss your smilin [smiling] face, you are one of the few who truly cared, who cried tears not for us, but with us, i [I] can hope to show the same love to your family as you always showed for us, thank you for being there, they'll take care of you up there...rest peacefully my friend". The same day that Baldini was killed, 21 year-old Brianna Kinnear was shot and killed in Port Coquitlam. Kinnear had worked as a drug dealer, selling cocaine, marijuana and Oxycontin together with her boyfriend Jesse Margison and best friend Tiffany Bryan. On 6 February 2009, a Bacon brother associate, the mixed martial arts fighter Kevin LeClair, was shot in the front of the Marketplace IGA grocery store at the Thunderbird Centre and died the next day.

Nicola Cotrell, a British stripper living in Surrey who was Barzan Tilli-Choli's girlfriend, was involved in one of his murder attempts. On 13 February 2009, Cotrell texted Tilli-Choli: "I’m in love with you, I’ll do what you asked earlier. I want to spend tonight with you so I can wake up with my love on Valentines". On the night of 16 February 2009 while working at the T-Barz strip club in Surrey, she sent Tilli-Choli a text after seeing Tyler Willock of the Red Scorpions present at the bar, writing "that guy" (Willock) was present. Willock together with his friend Fraser Sunderland and a woman who remains unidentified had just gotten into a Power Rover automobile in the parking lot of the T-Barz when a group in a SUV pulled up besides them and opened, causing Sunderland to attempt to flee. The SUV followed and continued to shoot at Sunderland's car, causing Sunderland to take a bullet in his left shoulder. Sunderland was badly wounded while Willock survived unhurt.

On 16 February 2009, Nicole Marie Alemy, the wife of an UN gang member, Koshan Alemy, was gunned down in her car. As she was driving only with her 4-year-old son and the windows of her Cadillac CTS coupe were clear, it is believed that this was not a case of mistaken identity, but rather that her killers had targeted her intentionally as a way to bring grief to her husband. The murder of Alemy finally changed public opinion in the Lower Mainland and people began to supply information about the underworld. For the first time, the police phonelines for tips was overwhelmed as thousands of people called in to supply potential information about the Alemy murder. Mountie Corporal Dale Carr told the media: "We're starting to see a bit of a groundswell, if you, of people just saying, 'enough is enough, we're fed up, we're going to give a call'". Two of the callers identified themselves as long-time members of the Red Scorpions who both stated that they were disgusted by the cold-blooded execution of a mother in front of her 4-year-old son, and the information they supplied proved to be very useful to the police. On 22 February 2009, an anti-gang rally was held in Surrey's Central City Plaza, where the lead speaker was Eileen Mohan who demanded once again that the police take action to arrest those responsible for the Surrey Six massacre.

Despite the change in public opinion, the gang war continued. On 17 February 2009, the gangster Shane Messent of the Red Scorpions, in a case of mistaken identity, shot Aleem Mohammed as he was answering the door to his parents' house. Mohammed's brother, Amir Mohammed, gave chase to Messent, tackled him and took away his gun, which he then used to kill him. Aleem Mohammed survived his wound to the chest while charges were dropped against Amir Mohammed under the grounds he killed Messent in self-defense. Corey Konkin of Maple Ridge was murdered on 26 February 2009 in a case of mistaken identity, being shot in the head. On 2 March 2009, the gangster Sukhwinder Dhaliwal of Abbotsford was found murdered in his automobile in Delta with the cause of death being shot several times.

On 3 March 2009, the gangster Sunil Mall of Abbotsford, a former member of the UN gang who joined the Red Scorpions, was murdered, being found shot dead in his car. Gregor Robertson, the mayor of Vancouver, gave a speech on television, noting that Vancouver was due to host the Winter 2010 Olympics and that the violence of the gang war was ruining the image of Vancouver as the city was acquiring the dubious reputation of being a crime-infested city. Robertson stated the police were "losing the battle" and the public needed to supply more information "to turn the tide". Corporal Peter Thissen of the RCMP told the media: "I wouldn't say the area is under-policed, but certainly we could use additional resources. We're trying to engage the public because we cannot do this ourselves. This is not about more police on the street necessarily, this is about the public becoming engaged in a problem that they need to help us solve".

After initially failing to announce that they had a gang war on their hands, on March 6, 2009, the Vancouver police announced there was a gang war after making several arrests. Despite the police statements, Langton noted: "In spite of a few high-profile arrests, including that of Tilli-Choli, it appeared as though the gangsters still ruled the streets of the Lower Mainland Bodies were piling up at a horrendous rate and the few people actually getting arrested seemed to be literally getting away with murder". On 31 March 2009, two Red Scorpions, Sean "Smurf" Murphy and Ryan "Whitey" Richards, were both murdered. The corpse of Murphy was found inside of his automobile in Abbotsford early on the morning of 31 March while later the same day a man out for a walk discovered the shot-up corpse of Richards behind the Yellow Barn Country Produce vegetable market in Abbotsford.

In particular the police went after the leadership of the UN and Red Scorpion gangs and closely monitored the Bacon Brothers after they survived a rash of hits against them. On 1 April 2009, Dennis Karbovanec turned himself in to the police and confessed that he had been one of the gunmen involved in the Surry Six massacre of 2007. In an interview with Kim Bolan, the crime correspondent of The Vancouver Sun newspaper, Karbovanec stated that hearing Eileen Mohan on television had inspired him to "come clean". On the basis of the information provided by Karbovanec, Jamie Bacon was arrested on 3 April 2009. In May, police arrested eight senior U.N. members, including the leader, Iraqi immigrant Barzan Tilli-Choli, on charges of conspiracy to kill the Bacon brothers, while Dennis Karbovanec a member of the Red Scorpions pleaded guilty to previous crimes.

Willock took to joking that with LeClair murdered, he would not have to pay the $40,000 drug debt he owed. Another Red Scorpion, Albert Jackman-who had a tattoo of LeClair's face on his body-found this joke so unfunny that on the night of 8 May 2009, he tied Willock to a chair and used a sledgehammer to beat him bloody, leaving his bedroom soaked in his blood. Jackman was careful not to kill Willock as he noted that he spared his vital organs and just smashed his non-vital organs to make him feel pain. On the night of 28 May 2009, Kyle Barber and his girlfriend, Hayley Lloyd, were watching television in their Langley house, when two Red Scorpions, Jackman and Gregory Barrett marched into their house. Jackman accused Barber and Lloyd of stealing some $50,000 from a Red Scorpion owned grow-op next door, saying: "You took my shit, my $50,000 worth of shit". Jackman used a pair of scissors to torture Barber and rip open his throat, an attack that proved to be fatal. On 29 September 2009, a group of UN gunmen tried to kill Randy Naicker, the leader of the Independent Soldiers, who was living in a Vancouver half-house at the time. The log book stated that Naicker had just signed out and had gone to the local convenience store. The clerk had mistaken Raj Soomel for Naicker, and the gunmen raced off to the convenience store to kill Soomel out of the belief that he was Naicker.

On 27 November 2009, Geoff Meisner, a mixed martial arts fighter, went missing in Kelowna with his truck being found abandoned. Mesiner has never been seen or heard since, and his widow Tammy had him declared legally dead. In common with many other MMA fighters, Meisner was involved in organized crime and his widow later admitted he worked for the Hells Angels. Juel Stanton, a "full patch" member of the Hells Angels who worked as a debt collector with a criminal record going to back to 1988 was considered to be extremely volatile and violent. In an unusual move, Stanton was expelled from the Vancouver East End chapter in May 2010 as a "loose cannon". On the morning of 16 August 2010 Stanton was murdered in his luxury house at 202 West 11th in Vancouver. Langton wrote that by the time of Stanton's murder "...there wasn't a gang war on anymore. Although both the UN and Red Scorpions continued to exist and do business, they no longer had the manpower, leadership or will to fight it out on the streets". The gang war confirmed the dominance of the Hells Angels in the Lower Mainland underworld.

Another group that benefitted from the gang war was the Dhak-Duhre group which had seized much of the drug market from the Red Scorpions. After a lull in late 2009 and early 2010, the gang war resumed with the fatal shooting of Gurmit Singh Dhak in the parking lot of Metrotown shopping mall in Burnaby B.C. on 16 October 2010. It is widely speculated that Dhak was murdered in front of his wife and twin daughters by Kelowna gangster and Adiwal associate Robin Rochemont in retaliation for the may 26 shooting of Adiwal believed to have been orchestrated by the Dhak Duhre alliance. Langton noted that the gang war had in a sense weakened the Hells Angels who normally passed off the work of committing crimes to others. In October 2010, a group of Hells Angels led by a "full patch" member of the East End chapter, Joseph Bruce Skreptak, were arrested in a van in Salmon Arm. Found inside of the van was a sawed-off shotgun, bulletproof vests, an ax, bear spray and a device for jamming cellphones. Skreptak and other men were all acquitted of the weapons charges, but the arresting officer, Staff Sergeant Kevin Keane of the Salmon Arm detachment of the RCMP has stated: "I think it's fair to say they were up to no good". On 1 November, Streptak was arrested on charges of robbing a house in Kelowna and beating up the residents. In 2013, Skreptak was convicted of aggravated assault. Langton wrote that it once would have been "preposterous" for a "full patch" Hells Angel like Skreptak to engage in such activities "instead of pawning it off on some underling".

== Gang-related homicides and shootings ==
Gang shootings were the subject of intense media coverage in Vancouver in 2009. These events include:

=== January ===
- 20: Jamie Bacon's car shot at while driving through Abbotsford. Bacon was the subject of an unusual public warning issued by police earlier this year, suggesting anyone dealing with him could be at risk.
- 22: Forty-two-year-old man wounded in an apparent robbery at Abbotsford marijuana grow-operation.
- 23: Two men wounded by shots fired outside Abbotsford home.
- 24: Occupant of a Surrey home wounded by early-morning shots fired through door.
- 27: Andrew (Drew) Cilliers, 26, shot outside a home in what appeared to be a targeted attack.

=== February ===
- 2: James Ward Erickson, 25, shot in an apartment in Surrey.
- 3: Brianna Helen Kinnear, 22, found shot in a truck in Coquitlam.
- 3: Raphael Baldini, 21, shot in a busy parking lot in Surrey.
- 6: William Wayne Cloud, 19, fatally stabbed in a house.
- 6: Kevin LeClair, 26, Surrey man shot in the parking lot outside a Langley grocery store.
- 8: Man wounded in shooting in west-side Vancouver parking lot.
- 11: Nicholas Gordon Smith, 24, shot in the basement of a house.
- 12: Shots fired at a Burnaby home, no suspect found. Some suspect Babez Crew was involved.
- 16: Driver wounded after shots fired at SUV outside Surrey strip club; police later arrest five people, charge two with attempted murder.
- 16: Nicole Alemy killed in Surrey while driving husband's car with four-year-old son in back seat.
- 17: Shane Alan Messent, 24, shot while committing a home invasion.
- 22: Man known to police wounded in shooting in east Vancouver.
- 26: Cory Stephen Konkin, 30, shot in his car in Maple Ridge.
- 27: Man shot outside Surrey home in what police call targeted attack.

=== March ===
- 2: Sukhwinder Singh Dhaliwal, 32, found fatally shot.
- 3: Young woman killed and man wounded in shooting at Burnaby apartment.
- 3: Sunil Mall, 27, shot in his car in East Vancouver.
- 3: Shots fired in drive-by shooting outside suspected drug house in Surrey.
- 5: Man shot in drive-by shooting at Vancouver home.
- 10: Two men fatally shot in an apartment.
- 15: Laura Lynn Lamoureux, 36, gunned down in a Langley gutter early Saturday morning.
- 19: Marc Bontkes, 33, found fatally shot in the parking lot of Hi-Knoll Park.
- 30: Sean Murphy, 21, fatally shot in his car on Bateman Road and Latimer Street.
- 31: Ryan Richards, 19, fatally found in a field behind a produce store.

=== April ===
- 4: Unidentified man found fatally shot in an SUV.
- 6: Lionel Tan, 24, shot to death outside a gas station.
- 15: Betty Yan, 39, found fatally shot in a grey Mercedes at a dark industrial Richmond strip mall.

=== May ===
- 1: Joseph Randay, 18, and Dilsher Singh Gill, 17, were abducted and then fatally shot in an abandoned SUV.
- 12: Damon Michael Martin, 33, found fatally shot with a shotgun lying on a road in the Panorama Ridge area of Surrey.
- 16: Christopher Roy Whitmee, 34, fatally shot on 176 Street and 57th Avenue in Cloverdale, a town centre in Surrey. Another man was critically injured.
- 26: Parminder Adiwal, 30, alleged leader of Independent Soldiers, was shot over 20 times in his Burnaby underground parking lot. He miraculously survives.
- 28: Sarbjit Nagra, 29, shot on a Maple Ridge street. Drove himself to hospital where he died of his injuries.

=== June ===
- 11: Jeffrey Qi Feng Bian, fatally stabbed in an 18th-floor Yaletown condominium.
- 30: Jaswant Rai, 36, found shot to death in an SUV on Mount Lehman Road between Townshipline Road and Downes Road.

=== July ===
- 13: Unidentified South Asian male found shot dead inside the A Canadian Autobody and Painting workshop in Surrey.
- 16: John William Hanna, 25, found dead in a burned-out car in Burnaby, killed in a targeted hit.

== See also ==
- Bacon Brothers (gangsters)
- Indo-Canadian organized crime
- Quebec Biker War

== Books ==
- Langton, Jerry (2013). The Notorious Bacon Brothers : inside gang warfare on Vancouver streets. Etobicoke, Ont.: J. Wiley and Sons Canada. ISBN 978-1118388679.
