= Indo-Canadian organized crime =

- Founding location: British Columbia
- Years active: 1980s–present
- Territory: Principal location: Punjab, India Controlled Territory: British Columbia, Alberta, Saskatchewan, Manitoba, Ontario, Quebec, Yukon, Washington, Alaska Areas of Influence: Nova Scotia, California, Oregon, Minnesota, New Jersey, New York, Texas, Florida, Illinois, Michigan, Arizona, United Kingdom, Australia, New Zealand, Vietnam, Thailand, Philippines, Hong Kong, Italy, Greece, Russia, Mexico, Colombia, Panama, Chile, Bolivia, Peru, Costa Rica, El Salvador Minor Connections: Spain, Germany, France, Africa, India, United Arab Emirates
- Ethnicity: Mostly Punjabi-Canadian, other ethnicities include Indo-Fijian and Indo-Caribbean Canadians
- Criminal activities: Assassination, drug trafficking, money laundering, murder, weapon trafficking, illegal gambling, robbery, chop shop, assault, loan sharking, racketeering, extortion, contract killing, kidnapping

Indo-Canadian organized crime is made up predominantly of young adults and teenagers of Indian ethnic, cultural and linguistic background. Collectively, these groups are among the top 5 major homegrown organized crime hierarchy across the nation in Canada coming in 3rd place, after the Chinese Triads and Hells Angels. The 2004 RCMP British Columbia Annual Police Report ranked them third in terms of organization and sophistication in British Columbia, ranked behind outlaw motorcycle clubs and aforementioned Chinese criminal organizations such as the Triads drug clans.

== History ==
Some of the young men involved today in crime may come from first-generation backgrounds but the majority are second and third-generation Punjabi-Canadians. These individuals were initially involved in petty street crimes, but older and more calculating criminals from the community quickly saw opportunities to make a profit from the situation. Often using clan-based ties and connections in their ancestral homeland, mainly in the parts of the Punjab, organized criminals from there were able to build criminal empires making use of young street gangs. During the period from 2006 to 2014, 34 South Asians made up 21.3% of gang related deaths in British Columbia.

In the 1980s, there was a violent struggle to have the Punjab break away from India to found a new state to be called Khalistan ("the land of the pure"). In June 1984, the Indian Prime Minister, Indira Gandhi, had the Indian Army storm the most sacred site for Sikhs, the Golden Temple or the Darbar Sahib ("abode of God") in Amritsar, which had been taken over by armed Sikh separatists. During the ensuing battle between 5–8 June 1984, the Darbar Sahib was severely damaged with over 492 deaths reported by the government, the actual number likely much higher. The incident was seen by many Sikhs around the world as a massacre and a declaration of war by India upon their community. In Canada, some members in the Sikh community started to engage in revolutionary activities in support of Khalistan. Though the intention was initially political, some of the activists also started to engage in organized crime as a way to raise money for the struggle. Ranjit "Ron" Dosanjh, the president of the Vancouver chapter of the separatist International Sikh Youth Federation, became the leader alongside his brother Jimsher "Jimmy" Dosanjh of the Dosanjh gang.

One man who led the gangster lifestyle was Gurmit Singh Dhak, leader of the once Dhak gang. After being arrested in the early 2000's with kilos of drugs and a loaded firearm, Dhak was contacted by the Odd Squad of the Royal Canadian Mounted Police about making an anti-gang video for high school students. In a video made in June 2010, Dhak stated the swaggering, macho aggression of the gangsters hid a deep insecurity and fear as he stated that to live the life of a gangster was to live in fear, never knowing when someone would try to kill him and never knowing who to trust. Dhak stated: "...if I could turn back time, I would never do it again. Every day I've got to look over my shoulder; I've got to worry about my family, I've got to worry about, if I jump out of my car, am I going to get shot? Or, you know, I could be walking in the mall and walking out and getting shot. I don't know...Oh, I want to get out. But it's too late now to get out. I have too many enemies". On October 16, 2010, Dhak was found shot dead in the driver's seat of his black BMW SUV, which was parked in the parking lot of the Metrotown Mall in Burnaby. His murder remains unsolved.

Rivals have posted rap songs advocating murder such as a young man from Surrey, alleged to have committed two murders and charged by RCMP, posted an online tribute to the murdered Gavinder Grewal, the deceased founder of the Brothers Keepers gang. Tyrel Nguyen Quesnelle, using his rapper name "T-Sav", boasted in his rap song My Life that he was willing to both kill and die for his deceased gang-leader, Grewal. T-sav rapped in his song: "They took GG from us, realest trapper ever living. I swear we riding out for you till they all ain't living." and "I caught my first body when you was in school...Brothers Keepers, that's a life contract, little nigga." Police in the Lower Mainland maintain that songs glorifying violence and criminality while boasting about drug dealing and murder are increasing tensions between gangs.

The Brothers Keepers are not the only gang threatening their enemies musically as in the fall of 2019, after he was released from a jail, the rapper Lolo Lanski posted his song Dedman to SoundCloud and YouTube. As of January 24, 2020, the song had 80,000 downloads. The song denounces the Brother Keepers and describes how Grewal was shot inside his penthouse home in 2017. The lyrics of Dedman admiringly declare that the killer "sent lead to his head" and the assassination was "trying to put a BK [Brother's Keeper] on TV." In a bizarre note, Dedman also includes an audio excerpt of the 911 call made by Grewal's brother Manbir after he found his brother's corpse in the penthouse. The use of rap in the present underworld conflict between the Brothers Keepers vs. both the Kang group and the United Nations gang is new, but police in B.C. have stated they have witnessed an overlap between rap and the underworld subcultures before.

A major drug bust conducted in April 2021 broke up an Indo-Canadian trafficking network primarily based in Brampton, Ontario. Of the 28 arrested, the majority were India-born Punjabi men. Police seized $2.3 million worth of drugs including 10 kilograms of cocaine, eight kilograms of ketamine, three kilograms of heroin and 2.5 kilograms of opium. Additionally, 48 firearms and $730,000 in Canadian currency were seized as part of the bust. This criminal network was reported by York Regional Police, Toronto Police Services, Peel Regional Police, RCMP and the DEA to operate as far as Western Canada, California and India.

== Activities ==
Gangs and criminal organizations within the Punjabi-Canadian community have also been noted for adopting the rigid structure and rules of the Punjabi Mafia, with strict rules against talking to police and against any kind of drug use amongst members and associates aside from alcohol or cigarettes use, though excessive use of these substances is also allegedly met with punishment within the gangs.

The main trade of the Indo-Canadian crime groups are murder-for-hire operations, along with arms trafficking, racketeering, extortion, assassinations, and the trafficking of cocaine, heroin, MDMA, methamphetamine and cannabis. Punjabi-Canadian crime bosses use their family connections in the Punjab to bring in heroin from the "Golden Crescent" nations of Afghanistan, Pakistan and Iran where much of the world's heroin is produced. Punjabi-Canadian crime groups widened the reach of their activities and delved into other crimes such as kidnapping, loan sharking, money laundering and chop shops. Organized gangs from the community have used the local transportation business, setting up connections with Mexican drug cartels and using truck drivers to smuggle cocaine from Mexico into the United States and Canada, in exchange for MDMA, Methamphetamine, Cannabis (drug) and hashish for the cartels. The profits of drug dealing allow for contract killing.

== Criminal groups ==
Most Indo-Canadian crime groups in Ontario and Alberta are either several clans controlled by one family with friends and relatives associated with the group or sometimes networks of truck drivers involved in cross-border drug smuggling that are classified as gangs. The largest organized Indo-Canadian gang presence is in British Columbia, Alberta and Ontario.

The largest crime groups are:

- Dhak-Duhre: United Nations coalition although most of the original leaders such as Sandip Duhre, Sukh Dhak and Gurmit Dhak have been killed. It is now believed to be decentralized, but the associates of the leaders are still believed to control different crime groups and keep in contact with each other. The Dhak-Duhre coalition is known to have developed strong ties with the UN and waged a war against the Wolf Pack, a gang composed of various factions of the Independent Soldiers, Red Scorpions and Hell's Angels led by the Bacon brothers.
- Punjabi Mafia: Currently controlled by the Johal Family. Other parts of it are considered to be mostly dismantled with only a few former factions of the Buttar Family still operating. The Punjabi Mafia was originally founded by Ranjit Cheema, the Dosanjh Brothers and Robbie Kandola. It was later controlled by Bindy Johal until his murder.
- Independent Soldiers: Currently has two factions, one consisting mostly Caucasians and another consisting mostly of Punjabis and led by the Adiwal brothers. Sikh-Canadians make up most of the gang along with a small number of Fijians and Hindus, although recently there has been a significant increase of Caucasians in the gang who have risen up through the ranks. This organization is part of the Wolf Pack and was founded by Jimsher Dosanjh
- Sanghera Crime Group: Founded by Uddham Sanghera, this gang is believed to be responsible for over 100 shootings in the South Slope Gang War in Vancouver against the Malhi-Buttar Coalition. The Vancouver Police Department has targeted and for the most part been able to capture members of the group. The courts have sentenced members of the Sanghera family to prison terms although it is believed that the remnants of the organization are still active
- Malhi-Buttar Coalition: This coalition was made up of two groups, one led by T.J Malhi and based in Richmond and the other led by the Buttar brothers (Kelly, Bal and Manny Buttar) based in South Vancouver. This group is now defunct after the deaths of most of its senior leadership and imprisonment of most of its members. This organization was the other group involved in the South Slope Gang War against the Sanghera crime group.
- Brothers Keepers: Founded by Gavin Grewal with most of its members and leadership formerly aligned with the Red Scorpions. This organization is active mainly in Metro Vancouver but is believed to have made inroads into the Interior of British Columbia, Vancouver Island, Alberta and Ontario. The Brothers Keepers are led by the Grewal/Dhaliwal Crime Group
- Kang Crime Group: Formerly a part of the Brothers Keepers organization but due to differences between members, had splintered and formed a new organization. The Kang Crime Group is known to be in a war with the Brothers Keepers for control of territory in Metro Vancouver. This organization is thought to be based in Burnaby, British Columbia but its presence is thought to extend throughout the Lower Mainland area.

== See also ==
- List of gangs in Canada
- Indo-Canadians
  - Punjabi Canadians
- 2009 Vancouver gang war
