= Red Scorpions =

Canadian crime gang

- Founded: Early 2000
- Founders: Quang Vinh Thang "Michael" Le; Konaam Shirzad; Tejinder Singh Malli; Matthew Johnston; Person X (an unnamed young offender)
- Founding location: Vancouver, British Columbia
- Years active: Early 2000 – present
- Territory: Lower Mainland
- Ethnicity: Various
- Activities: Arms trafficking, drug trafficking, illegal immigration, money laundering, murder, kidnapping
- Allies: Blood In, Blood Out gang (Kang Crime Family); Sanghera Crime Family; Russian mafia (Bratva)
- Rivals: Brothers Keepers (BC, Alberta, Ontario); Duhre group (BC, Alberta, Ontario); Dhak group (lower mainland); Fob-killers (Alberta); Hells Angels; Independent Soldiers (BC, Alberta, Ontario); United Nations

The Red Scorpions is a gang based in British Columbia, Canada. It was formed in 2000 by Quang Vinh Thang Le (known as Michael Le), Tejinder Malli, Konaam Shirzad, Matthew Johnston, and one other un-named young offender Person X. Michael Le testified at the Surrey Six trial that he and Shirzad formed the Red Scorpions after meeting in a youth detention centre facility. Le said the name Scorpions was a tribute to his "older brother who was killed and his nickname used to be Scorpion". The gang "used the word Red to symbolize blood" he said. Le said Jamie Bacon and his brothers were not founders but joined the gang a few years later.

Red Scorpions have been running "dial-a-dope lines" – (drug trafficking operations) in the suburbs of Vancouver since 2001. Gang members can be identified by "RS" tattoos on their arms and necks; any forms of skull tattoos usually indicates a member who has carried out a murder for the gang. The Red Scorpions come from various cultural and linguistic backgrounds, as they consider race secondary to loyalty and respect.

The Red Scorpions have been involved in an increasing number of well-publicized incidents of gang violence in the Vancouver area, in part due to their bitter rivalry with the United Nations gang. The Red Scorpions-United Nations relationship worsened after the infamous Bacon brothers left the UN to join forces with the Red Scorpions.

== Origins ==
The two founding members were the Thai-Canadian Edward "Eddie" Sousakhone Narong and the Vietnamese-Canadian Quang Vinh Thang "Michael" Le, both of whom lived in Coquitlam. Other important early members were Tejinder Malli and Konaam Shirzad. The name Red Scorpions was chosen as the name for their gang in 2000. Both Narong and Le were bullied as teenagers by a Korean-Canadian teenager, Richard Jung. In the summer of 2000, Le and Narong led their gang into the Hi-Max karaoke club in Coquitlam and beat Jung to death in the men's washroom.

Both Narong and Le were charged with second-degree murder, but in 2002 in a plea bargain with the Crown both pleaded guilty to manslaughter. Both were sentenced to 18 months in the Willingdon Youth Detention Centre. During their time at Willingdon, Le and Narong reinvented the Red Scorpions gang from the more loosely structured and informal gang they had founded in 2000. Le and Narong declared that members of the Red Scorpions would always have tattoos on their wrists and/or necks to identify them as gang members. The Red Scorpions borrowed much from the United Nations gang and from outlaw biker clubs as the gang was envisioned as multi-ethnic; all members were required to know martial arts; the gang uses sham versions of "Eastern philosophies" as a sort of ideology; and finally the structure of the gang was modelled after outlaw biker clubs.

== Growth ==
A key member of the gang was Anton Hooites-Meursing, who was born in Calgary in 1971 to a Canadian father and an Australian mother. Hooites-Meursing grew up in Australia and then in Los Angeles. The parents of Hooites-Meursing divorced and when he was 11, his mother abandoned him as he came from school one day to find a note saying that she wanted to live her own life and that he was now on his own. Hooites-Meursing grew up in Compton and he ended joining a Hispanic gang. His youth consisted of what he called "a decade of gladiator school in the Los Angeles County jail system, which for anybody that is white is a total nightmare". On 7 December 2001, Hooites-Meursing was deported to Canada after his release from an American prison, a nation that he barely knew. Hooites-Meursing settled in New Westminster and joined the Red Scorpions. His connections with various gangs in the Los Angeles area proved to be a major factor in the growth of the Red Scorpions as there was a huge demand in Los Angeles for the B.C. Bud strain of marijuana (considered to be the best strain of marijuana in the world) while there was much demand for cocaine and guns in the Vancouver area. Hooites-Meursing started to engage in gun-running and smuggling cocaine for the Red Scorpions while having B.C. Bud marijuana smuggled into the United States.

By 2005, the Red Scorpions had become a major gang in the Lower Mainland. The gang primarily sold cocaine, heroin and ecstasy via the so-called "dial-a-dope" lines. The dominant organized crime in the Lower Mainland are the Hells Angels. In the 2000s, the Hells Angels reduced other gangs in the Lower Mainland down to puppet gangs. The Independent Soldiers gang by 2005 became a puppet gang for the Hells Angels while the United Nations gang were likewise been reduced down to a subordinate status to the Hells Angels. By 2006, the Red Scorpions were the only major Lower Mainland gang that was not under Hells Angels control.

On 7 December 2006 at the Castle Fun Park in Abbotsford, Jamie Bacon of the Bacon brothers attended a meeting with several other men known to be gang members. A passer-by happened to notice one of the men talking at the Castle Fun Park had a gun and called the police. Arrested alongside Jamie Bacon were Randy Naicker and Bary Espadilla of the Independent Soldiers and Dennis Karbovanec and Anton Hooites-Meursing of the Red Scorpions. It is believed the Hells Angels had the Bacon brothers join and take control of the Red Scorpions as a way to bring the Red Scorpions under their control as another puppet gang. The journalist Jerry Langton wrote that the Castle Fun Park meeting of 2006 was "a recruiting meeting, with the Independent Soldiers (acting, as they always did, as the Hells Angels' proxy) luring the Bacon Brothers away from the increasingly independent and unreliable UN to the more docile and malleable Red Scorpions".

== Founding members ==
=== Michael Le ===
Quang Vinh Thang Le (known as Michael Le), an immigrant from Vietnam, grew up in Coquitlam and was a co-founder of the gang. He was earlier convicted of manslaughter for being in a group of teens who fatally beat another boy in a Coquitlam karaoke club in 2000. He founded the gang with some other youth delinquents while he was serving time in the juvenile centre. Le named the gang Red Scorpions, red denoting blood and Scorpion being the name of his brother known by the nickname Scorpion. In March 2008, he fled to his native Vietnam fearing arrest on an ongoing investigation and a Vancouver police sting operation. Moving later to Thailand, Hong Kong, and China, he was intercepted as he arrived in Manila, The Philippines on June 17, 2009 and was deported back to Canada.

Le signed a plea agreement with the Crown in November 2013 in the Surrey Six case and was sentenced to three years for "conspiracy to commit murder" in exchange for his testimony against other culprits in the gang including Red Scorpions members Cody Haevischer and Matthew Johnston, who were both convicted of all six murders. Michael Le entered a guilty plea to conspiracy to commit murder against Corey Lal. A joint submission by Crown prosecutor Peter Juk and Le's lawyer called for the 12-year term, minus almost nine years pre-trial credit for Le. The remaining sentence is just three years, one month.

=== Matthew Johnston ===
Matthew "Matt" Johnston (born 19 April 1984, died December 2022) was a co-founder of the gang. Brother of Cody morgan Johnston alongside Cody Haevischer were found guilty of first-degree murder and conspiracy to commit murder in connection with the Surrey Six affair. The leaders of the Red Scorpions gang were attempting to extort $200,000 from Corey Lal and when he didn't pay, they ordered him killed.

=== Konaam Shirzad ===
Konaam Shirzad (1983 – September 22, 2017) was a founding member when it started in mid 2000s although he was not as high-profile as other Red Scorpions. In 2005, Shirzad pleaded guilty to arranging a shooting he mistakenly linked to a man who had earlier testified against him. Accused of "mischief that endangered life", he was sentenced to 30 months in jail. In September 2009, Shirzad survived a shooting in West Vancouver. At an October 2010 court hearing, Shirzad claimed he had left the gang life. In February 2017, he was charged in Richmond to possession of a firearm contrary to a court order. In July, he pleaded guilty and got a 90-day sentence. Claiming he was no longer in the gang, he purchased the Heavy Metal Gym on Briar Avenue in Kamloops. The gym was raided by police in January 2017. Shirzad was shot and killed on the evening of September 22, 2017, just steps from his home on Hudson's Bay Trail.

== Surrey Six murders ==
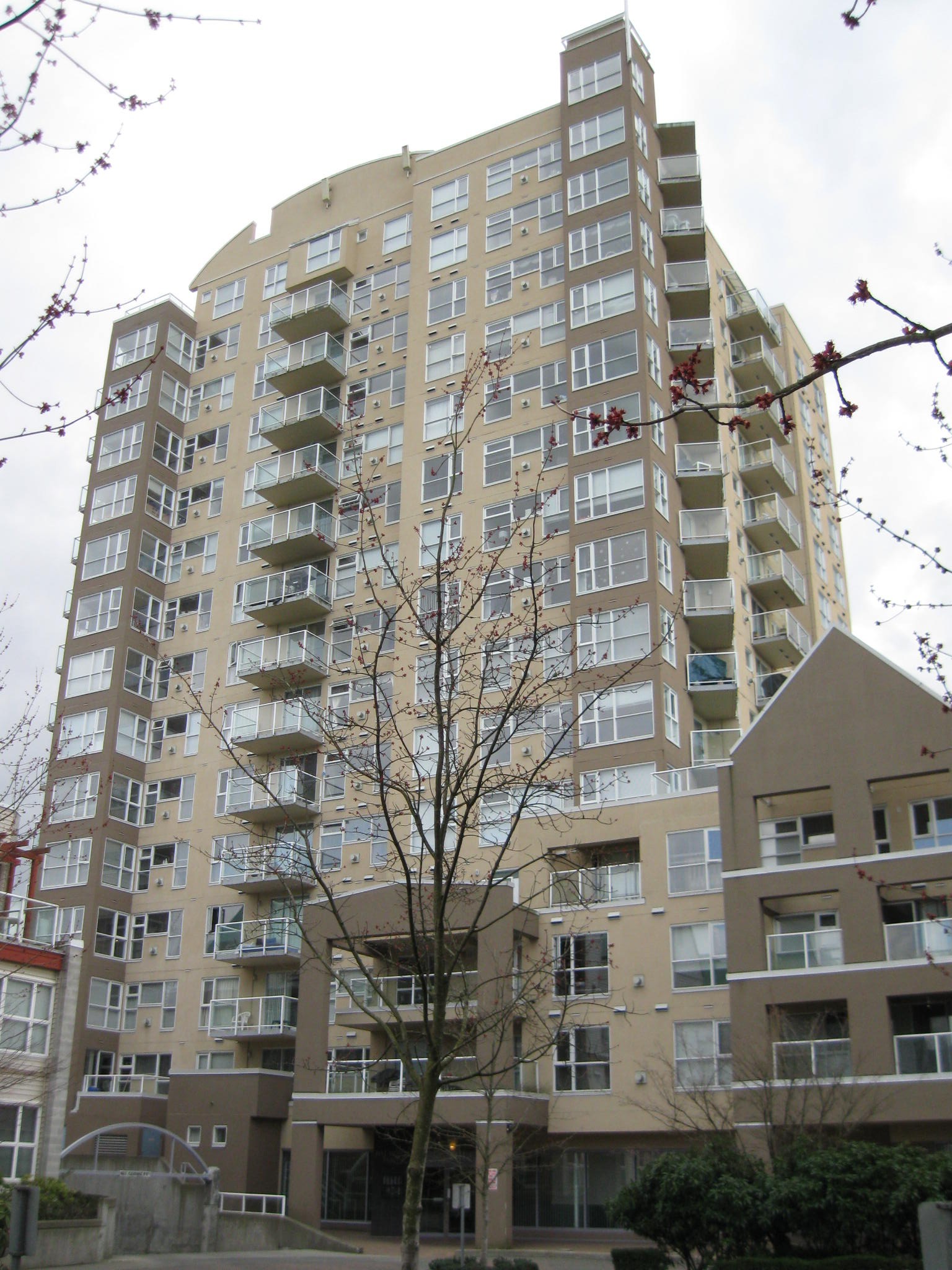
The Balmoral Tower Highrise building

The Red Scorpions have been linked to some of the bloodiest shootings in the region and were behind the October 19, 2007 killing of six people in a suite on 9800 East Whalley Ring Road, a condominium complex known as Balmoral Tower. The case is known as the Surrey Six massacre. The principal target was Corey Lal, a 22-year-old drug dealer who was selling drugs on the Red Scorpions' turf. Five other men were killed to eliminate them from becoming potential witnesses. They were Michael Lal, 26 (Corey Lal's older brother), Ryan Bartolomeo, 19, Eddie Narong, 22, and two innocent bystanders: 55-year-old gas fitter Ed Schellenberg and 22-year-old student neighbour Christopher Mohan, who unknowingly got caught in the incident. Cody Haevischer and an associate who can only be identified as "Person X" were tried later. Matthew Johnston and Cody Haevischer were charged with six counts of first-degree murder in the case. Jamie Bacon was charged with one count of first-degree murder in the death of Corey Lal. Michael Le was charged with conspiracy to commit murder against Corey Lal.

== Other main gang members ==
=== Matt Campbell ===
Matthew Gordon Campbell (1982 – January 2, 2014) was an alleged leader of the Red Scorpions at the time of his murder. Campbell was fatally stabbed in the neck on January 2, 2014 at the Abbotsford Auto Mall after an encounter with a member of a rival gang. Jimi Sandhu, 24, was charged with second degree murder of Campbell. Campbell was taken to hospital, where he died of his injuries.

=== Jonathan, Jarrod, and Jamie Bacon ===
Jonathan (also known as Jon), Jarrod, and Jamie Bacon were a trio of gangsters from Abbotsford, British Columbia who are suspected of multiple firearms and drug trafficking charges. Known as the Bacon Brothers, they were initially members of the United Nations gang.

In 2006, the brothers partnered with the Red Scorpions, a major rival of the United Nations, to help them compete with the United Nations gang. The authorities believed that the brothers took leadership control of the Red Scorpions shortly thereafter.

On April 3, 2009, Jamie was arrested by the Royal Canadian Mounted Police Emergency response team for his alleged involvement in the October 19, 2007 slayings of the 'Surrey Six'. This development occurred after an associate of the Bacon brothers, Dennis Karbovanec, pleaded guilty to his participation in the slayings. On September 11, 2020, he pleaded guilty to one count of conspiracy to commit the murder of Corey Lal. He was sentenced to 18 years in prison; with credit for time served, he will serve an additional five years and seven months in prison..

Jarrod was arrested in May 2009 on weapons charges, and was found guilty on February 2, 2012 of several charges relating to cocaine trafficking. On May 4, 2012, Jarrod was sentenced to 12 years in prison for conspiracy to traffic cocaine. The sentence was then reduced to seven years and two months after time served was taken into consideration.

In September 2009, the Integrated Gang Task Force reported that eight associates were murdered since the public warning by the police that those associated with Jon, Jarrod, and Jamie Bacon avoid the trio or be potentially marked for death by rival criminals. In May 2010, Jamie was convicted of all 11 charges related to the April 2007 discovery of a gun cache but Jarrod was acquitted.

On August 14, 2011, Jonathan was murdered via gunfire outside the Delta Grand Hotel in Kelowna, BC. Larry Amero, a full-patch member of the Hells Angels, was also critically injured in the attack. Jason McBride, Jujhar Khun-Khun, and Michael Kerry Hunter Jones are now charged in connection with the shooting.

=== Dennis Karbovanec ===
On April 3, 2009, Karbovanec (born 1982) pleaded guilty in his role of Surrey Six high-rise slayings of October 19, 2007 after turning himself in. On April 9, 2009, he was sentenced to life in prison with no eligibility for parole for 15 years. He was the target of a gangland hit on New Year's Eve 2008, but survived the murder attempt due to his body armour.

=== Cody Haevischer ===
One of the two alleged killers of the Surrey Six. Haevischer (born 1984) reportedly killed three of the victims and unidentified gang member "Person X" killed the other three. On the day of the murders, Michael Le attended a meeting at a Korean restaurant in Surrey with Haevischer, Johnston, and "Person X" also attending. Cody grew up in Harewood, a suburb of Nanaimo.

=== "Person X" ===
Cody Morgan Johnston The unidentified accomplice murderer of the Surrey Six, a Red Scorpion gang member and the alleged killer of three of the Surrey Six victims. For his direct involvement in the killing of three of the victims in the Surrey Six murders, he agreed to cooperate with police and pleaded guilty to shooting three of the Surrey Six victims.

He was convinced to become a Crown witness at the trial against co-accused murderer and accomplice Cody Haevischer and against alleged instigator Matt Johnston. But the presiding judge on the case banned "Person X" from testifying after months of in camera court proceedings. "Person X" is serving a life sentence without the possibility of parole for 15 years. There is a ban on identifying him by his real name.

Jamie Bacon is facing three new charges for an alleged plot to kill Person X. Bacon counseled another man, identified by the police, to murder Person X on behalf of a criminal organization.

=== "Person Y" ===
Person Y is another unidentified accomplice. He was convicted of first-degree murder in two unrelated gang cases and is serving 25 years to life. He admitted to playing a role in the conspiracy to murder Corey Lal, and acted as a police informant in the Surrey Six case.

== See also ==
- 2009 Vancouver gang war

== Books ==
- Langton, Jerry (2013). The Notorious Bacon Brothers Inside Gang Warfare on Vancouver Streets. Toronto: John Wiley and Sons. ISBN 9781118404577.
- Totten, Mark (2012). Nasty, Brutish, and Short The Lives of Gang Members in Canada. Toronto: James Lorimer Publishers. ISBN 9781459400399.
