= Surrey Six massacre =

2007 gang-related mass murder in Surrey, British Columbia, Canada

- Location: Surrey, British Columbia, Canada
- Date: 19 October 2007
- Target: The Lal Crew
- Attack type: Gang massacre
- Weapon: Handguns,
- Deaths: 6
- Perpetrator: Red Scorpions
- Convicted: 2 of first-degree murder 1 of second-degree murder 1 of conspiracy to commit murder 1 of counselling murder

The Surrey Six massacre was a gang-related massacre that occurred in Surrey, British Columbia on 19 October 2007. The victims included drug dealer Corey Lal and his associates, along with two innocent bystanders, Chris Mohan and Ed Schellenberg, who were in the wrong place at the wrong time. The killers, members of the Red Scorpions gang, shot all six men in the head.

== The Lal crew ==
The so-called Lal crew were a small gang based in Unit 1505 in the Balmoral Tower condo in Surrey. The Lal crew consisted of the 22-year old Edward "Eddie" Narong, one of the founders of the Red Scorpions who had broken away to found his own gang; the 26-year old Michael Justin Lal and his younger brother, 22-year old Corey Jason Lal; and the 19-year old Ryan Bartolomeo. All four had criminal records.

The one with the most serious criminal record was Narong who had been involved in a killing. The Thai-Canadian Edward "Eddie" Sousakhone Narong and the Vietnamese-Canadian Quang Vinh Thang "Michael" Le, both of whom lived in Coquitlam, had beaten to death a Korean-Canadian, Richard Jung, who was bullying them. Jung had been attacked and beaten to death in the men's washroom of the Hi-Max karaoke club in Coquitlam. Narong and Le had founded the Red Scorpions gang while serving their sentences at the Willingdon Youth Detention Center. Le had been convicted of second degree murder, but had his sentence reduced down to manslaughter on appeal while Narong had pleaded guilty to manslaughter in a plea bargain. Both Le and Narong had served their 18 month sentences at the Willingdon Youth Detention Center, where they established the Red Scorpions gang.

Between his release from the Willingdon Youth Detention Centre in October 2003 and his murder in October 2007, Narong had been charged 30 different times, mostly related to drug trafficking and weapons charges. Narong had been able to have most of the charges stayed for one reason or another, but was due in court to face charges of assaulting a police officer after he attacked a policeman in May 2007. In 2007, Narong had a dispute with Le and the Bacon brothers who joined the Red Scorpions in late 2006, and broke away from the Red Scorpions to form a new gang. Both of the Indo-Canadian Lal brothers were career drug dealers who had been members of the Independent Soldiers. Michael Lal had been convicted of drug trafficking in 2006 and Corey Lal was facing charges of drug trafficking following his arrest earlier in 2007. The Lal brothers resented the way that the Hells Angels had violently taken control of the Independent Soldiers and broke away to join forces with Narong. Both of the Lal brothers had been friends with Mahmoud Alkhalil who had been killed in a shootout with the Hells Angels on 16 August 2003, and decided to leave the Independent Soldiers after the Hells Angels had taken control. The Italian-Canadian Bartolomeo had been arrested in December 2006 and was due in court soon to face four counts of drug possession with the intention to traffic along with two counts relating to weapons charges. Bartolomeo's cousin, Damian Bartolomeo, with whom he was close, was an associate of the Hells Angel Juel Stanton, and had been convicted in 2002 for leading a violent home invasion of a marijuana grow-op. Unit 1505 was a condo owned by the real estate agent Ceasar Tiojanco who had rented it out to Raphael Baldini of the Red Scorpions who had in turn had sub-let the unit to the Lal crew. Baldini had sublet the unit out before Narong had left the Red Scorpions. The Lal crew had been in a dispute with Jamie Bacon of the Red Scorpions about how much "tax" they owed him for the right to sell drugs in Surrey.

Two of the victims were innocent of any crime. The 55-year old Ed Schellenberg was a committed Mennonite from Coaldale who had done missionary work in the United States, Poland and the Northwest Territories. The journalist Jerry Langton wrote: "He stood just five foot eight. He was bald and stout and did not carry himself like a tough guy. Because he wasn't. No, he was a charmer. His oversized red handlebar moustache, ready smile, twinkling eyes and quick wit had always been enough to get him out of trouble in the past". Schellenbeg was described as a hardworking repair/maintenance man for gas fireplaces who was honest and reliable.The 22-year old Chris Mohan was the son of Indo-Fijian immigrants who had no involvement in crime, and was devoted to working out in the gym and to his girlfriend. Mohan was described as friendly, funny and outgoing by those who knew him. On 19 October 2007, Mohan who lived opposite Unit 1505 was going out to play basketball. His mother, Eileen Mohan, stated she knew only Baldini and did not know the people to whom he sublet unit 1505, nor did her son.

== The massacre ==
In August 2007, Jamie Bacon met with Corey Lal to demand that he pay him a $100,000 "tax" in exchange for the right to sell drugs in Surrey. At a meeting in a McDonald's in Surrey, Bacon told Lal he would be killed if he continued to refuse him the "tax" he wanted. Justice Kathleen Ker stated in 2020 that Bacon wanted Lal killed because of his ego, saying: "he didn't want to look weak. In their world, Corey Lal had to die". Ker stated that Jamie was the leader of the "diabolical plot" to have Lal killed.

On the afternoon of 19 October 2007, Schellenberg along with several other gasfitters were checking the gas fireplaces in all of the units in the Balmoral Tower for any possible flaws as part of an annual inspection, a requirement imposed by the condo corporation. Several gasfitters did not want to go into Unit 1505 whose tenants were considered disreputable and Schellenberg volunteered to do a job that no-one else wanted to do. At about 2:40 pm, Schellenberg was inspecting the gas fireplace in Unit 1505. A drug dealer, Sophon Sek, led the killers to Unit 1505 and knocked on the door of Unit 1505, which allowed the killers to enter the unit. Sek had been paid $25,000 to lead the killers to unit 1505 and helped them gain access. A group of Red Scorpions that consisted of Matthew James Johnston, Cody Morgan Johnston, Cody Rae Haevischer, and Denis Karbovanec rushed into Unit 1505 with their guns drawn. Mohan happened to see the killers in the hallway as he was going out of his unit to play basketball with his friends and was dragged into unit 1505 at gunpoint. All six men were forced to face the floor with their heads covered and were shot. In a statement to the police before his murder in 2009, the Red Scorpion gangster Kevin LeClair said: "I was told they rushed in, got everybody on the ground. I was told two different stories. But that Corey was like really upset and crying, like begging for his life, saying he’ll do anything". LeClair also said that he heard that Narong was defiant as he was reported to have said “fuck you, you’re fucking dead” before he was shot in the head.

Of the victims, Mohan was shot twice, once in the head and another shot to his neck with the latter bullet severing his spinal cord. Schellenberg was shot twice in the head. Narong was shot twice with a bullet in his head and another in his neck that partially severed his spinal cord. Michael Lal was shot in his back twice with one of the bullets puncturing one of his lungs and the other his heart.. Corey Lal was shot twice in the head. Bartolomeo had been shot the most, taking six bullets with four gunshot wounds to his back and another two to his right hand.

At about 4 pm, the building manager of the Balmoral Tower noticed that Schellenberg's truck was still in the parking lot. The manager went to the top floor, where he noticed the doors to units 1504 and 1505 were open. Inside of unit 1505 he noticed Schellenberg's corpse on the floor in a pool of blood. Fearing a gas leak, the manager pulled the alarm, which forced all of the tenants to go outside. The Surrey fire department discovered all six corpses in a blood-drenched floor in unit 1505, which led to the police being called. The city of Surrey had no police department, and the policing duties were provided by a 640-strong detachment of the Royal Canadian Mounted Police (RCMP). Superintendent Wayne Rideout received a call saying that six bodies had been found at the Balmoral Tower. Rideout later stated: "We had never had anything like this". Lois Schellenberg grew increasing anxious as her husband failed to answer his cell phone while Chris's Mohan's mother, Eileen Mohan, was likewise distraught when her son did not return her calls.

== Reaction ==
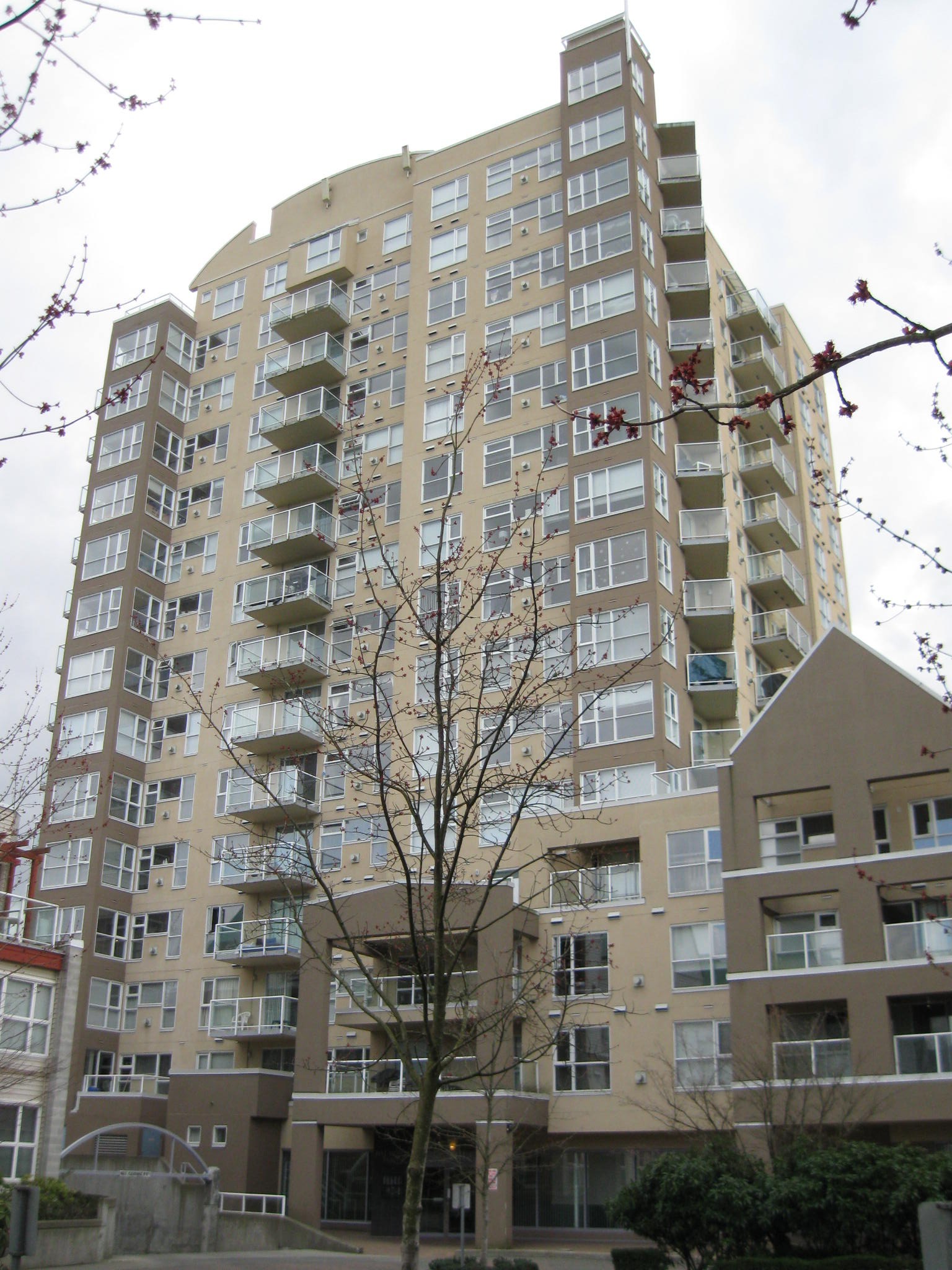
The Balmoral Tower Highrise building where the massacre took place.

The massacre received a massive amount of media coverage and generated much shock and horror, all the more because two of the victims were innocent by-standers who were shot down in cold blood merely for being in the wrong place at the wrong time. The massacre made the Bacon brothers infamous in British Columbia as the Lal Crew was "essentially exterminated", which showed how dangerous the competition for the control of the drug trade in the Lower Mainland had become. The massacre improved the underworld reputation of the Red Scorpions.

Eileen Mohan, the mother of Chris Mohan, became a powerful spokeswomen for justice for her family as she spoke often on television, radio and in public rallies demanding that police bring the killers to justice. The Hells Angel Ron Lising had been videotaped beating a man in 2005, but at his trial in November 2007, the judge gave him a $600 fine for assault. Mohan spoke about the Lising trial, which she used as an example of the weak responses of the authorities to the gangsters in the Lower Mainland who rarely went to prison for their crimes. On 3 February 2008 at a rally in the Bear Creek Park in Surrey, Mohan criticized the Crown for an inability to bring the killers to justice.

== Investigation ==
Sergeant Derek Brassington of the Royal Canadian Mounted Police was assigned as the lead investigator for the Surrey Six massacre. A Mountie who was married to a fellow Mountie, described as a "cop's cop" and had served 14 years in the major crimes unit in Surrey, Brassington was widely considered to be the best detective in British Columbia. Langton wrote about the Surrey Six massacre: "The killers had more chutzpah and ego than they had any technical knowledge of how best to go about assassination. They left behind a huge mess of DNA and other evidence. But real investigations are not at all like the magic they show on TV and in movies. To build a compelling case from even the sloppiest murder scene takes lots of hours of hard work and no small amount of luck".

Evidence released after the convictions of the police detectives in charge of the Surrey Six case in 2019 showed that instead of pursuing the killers behind the Surrey Six massacre, the Mountie detectives in charge of the case spent a disproportionate amount of their time in drunken debauchery. The elite police team spent much of their time being intoxicated at various bars and strip clubs while making sexual advances on female witnesses, which nearly ruined the case against Jamie Bacon. Two of the officers convicted claimed that their job stress made them incapable of rational thinking and the riotous bacchanalian excess that the squad engaged in was a result of their stress-induced mindlessness. Brassington's superior, Inspector David Attew of the RCMP, tried very hard to seduce the girlfriend of one of the witnesses for the Crown, which nearly caused the man to break off his agreement to testify against Jamie Bacon. The detectives in charge of the Surrey Six case all faced charges of fraud for billing the Crown for overtime pay while they were instead drinking in various bars and strip clubs.

== Legal proceedings ==
On 3 April 2009, Denis Karbovanec of the Red Scorpions turned himself in to the police and confessed to killing Chris Mohan, Ryan Bartolomeo and Michael Lal. Karbovanec stated that hearing Eileen Mohan speak on television persuaded him to confess to his involvement in the massacre. On the basis of his confession, on 4 April 2009, the police arrested Cody Haevishcher, Matthew Johnston and Jamie Bacon for the massacre. In April 2009, Karbovanec pleaded guilty to three counts of second-degree murder and one count of conspiracy to commit murder in exchange for 15 years in prison. Later on, Michael Le and another person known as "person x" due to a court order were also arrested for the massacre. Le fled back to his native Vietnam to escape arrest in Canada. Le was arrested in the Philippines as he landed at Manila airport on an Interpol warrant and was extradited to Canada on 29 June 2009. On 26 November 2009, Sophon Sek was arrested for involvement in the massacre. Sek had just won $364,364 at the B.C Poker Championship at the River Rock Casino Resort in Richmond and was arrested the next day.

After Karbovanec turned himself in, the RCMP team in charge of the Surrey Six case started a strategy known as "moving witnesses" under which the detectives would befriend the accused and their girlfriends in an attempt to persuade them to turn Crown's evidence. As such, the detectives became very close to the girlfriends of the accused, who were felt to be the weakest link in the conspiracy. Between June–December 2009, Brassington had a torrid affair with the former girlfriend of Jamie Bacon, a woman known as "Jane Doe 1" due to a court order who agreed to testify for the Crown against Jamie Bacon. It was revealed after his guilty plea in 2019 that Brassington had billed the Crown for overtime pay while he was in fact drinking and having sex with "Jane Doe 1" at the hotels they were provided by RCMP under the witness protection ordinance, in Calgary, Montreal, Toronto, Victoria, Halifax and Vancouver between June–December 2009. In an email to "Jane Doe 1", Brassington wrote: "You are the love of my life, and that will never change. One day, we will look back on the summer and now fall of 2009, gaze into each others’ eyes and be amazed at the wonder of it all and how we pulled through. People will stop inviting us to parties eventually [because] it is all we will talk about. I can’t wait for that day!"

On 11 September 2009, Jamie Bacon sued the Crown and warden Debbie Hawboldt of the Surrey Pretrial Services Centre, claiming that being held in solitary confinement was a form of torture. In the same lawsuit, Bacon also charged that cell 210 of the Surrey jail that he had lived in was full of "blood, feces and mucus" and his bed was a "vinyl-covered foam mat". Bacon stated that cell 227 he moved to in the summer of 2009 was a considerable improvement as it had a shower, a television and a microwave, but he complained that "mentally ill" prisoners had damaged the latter two. In 2010, a court ruled in favour of Bacon and ordered the Crown to pay him damages.

The police misconduct later almost ruined the case against Jamie Bacon as his lawyers argued that much of testimony against him was perjury as the detectives were sleeping with the witnesses against him. The statements from two of detectives who sought to explain their heavy drinking on the job as due to being allegedly incapable of rational thought left the evidence gathered by the first investigation wide open to attack from Jamie Bacon's lawyers. As a result, the police were forced to essentially restart the entire investigation anew, costing the Crown thousands of dollars and wasting countless hours of police time. In 2010, "Jane Doe 1" revealed her affair with Brassington after she became pregnant with his child and he refused to divorce his wife to marry her. The lawyers for Jamie Bacon moved to have the charges dismissed against their client under the grounds that her testimony was probably perjury made under Brassington's influence. Brassington was charged with obstruction of justice as was his superior Inspector David Attew, Constable Paul Johnson and Constable Danny Michaud whom the Crown alleged knew about Brassington's affair with "Jane Doe 1".

On 23 June 2011, the RCMP charged Brassington, Attew, Johnson and Michaud with 20 counts of fraud, breach of trust, and obstruction of justice for their handling of the Surrey Six case. At the time, a police psychologist, Mike Webster told a journalist: "Behaving in this way now has given defence counsel...in the Surrey Six case...a huge lever". The RCMP Chief Superintendent for British Columbia, Janice Armstrong, told the media at the time: "The investigators charged in this case were senior, experienced and trusted police officers. What is alleged to have occurred was a breach of policy, protocol and the law. Fundamentally, it was an abuse of the trust that the public places in police." Brassington resigned from the RCMP on 1 May 2013 rather than be fired.

On 29 September 2013, Haevischer, Johnston, and Le went on trial in Vancouver for first-degree murder. Johnston and Havischer were facing six counts of first degree murder while Le faced one count of first degree murder. The Crown began the trial by showing the courtroom crime scene photographs of the massacre with the six victims all facing the floor with hands covering their heads. Eileen Mohan-who attended the trial said of viewing the photographs-"I looked once and then I looked away. I want to remember my son the way he was. Not in this state...in blood amongst strangers that he never knew...and people that he never should have died with". The first witness to be called by the Crown was Norman Carothers, the building manager of the Balmoral Tower, who testified he found six corpses in unit 1505 with blood everywhere on the floor. The drug dealer Jason Le (no relation to Michael Le) testified that his "drug line" had been taken over violently by Corey Lal the day before the massacre as Lal had arrived in his basement apartment on 18 October 2007 with a gun to tell him that he was now working for him. Le testified that his former boss Stephen Leone arrived shortly after with "a lump on his face" after being beaten up by Lal. At about 1:30 pm on 19 October 2007, Le visited unit 1505 to see Lal, and where he saw Bartolomeo cooking crack cocaine in the kitchen.

On 7 October 2013, Helen Lee, a resident of the Balmoral Tower, testified that on afternoon of 19 October 2007 she had been nearly run over in the parking lot by a black BMW 745 sedan carrying three "scary men" wearing hoodies and gloves. Under cross-examination from Simon Buck, the defense counsel for Haevischer, Lee admitted: "No, I thought I saw them, but at the time I was overwhelmed and I was scared so I didn’t phone right away". Lee testified that she thought the three thuggish "scary men" were about to commit a robbery. Speaking through a Korean translator, Lee's friend, Young Mee Kim, also testified that she saw the three "scary men" in the black BMW leave the parking lot of the Balmoral Tower at high speed at about 2: 45 pm. Kim testified that not only was the black BMW driving at a high speed, but left the parking lot on the wrong side of the exit ramp. Kim further testified that the three men she saw leaving the parking lot were the same men whom Lee had seen arrive. The Crown noted that Haevischer owned a black BMW 745, the same type of car that both Lee and Kim testified to seeing in the parking lot of the Balmoral Tower. Corporal Greg Foster of the RCMP testified that he saw a black BMW 745 with the license plate of 805 DSL (the license plate of Haevischer's car) driving too fast on the Stanley parkway in the vicinity of the Balmoral Tower at about 3 pm on 19 October 2007.

In October 2013, Mike Tammen, the lawyer for Johnston, made much of the fact that a Glock handgun that was one of the murder weapons was not properly secured in the evidence locker room for three days after it was found at the crime scene on 21 October 2007, which he used to allege misconduct by Constable Michuad. Tammen argued that the Crown had not called Michaud as a witness was evidence of misconduct as he noted that normally the investigating police officers are called to testify.

In November 2013, Michael Le made a plea bargain with the Crown where he pleaded guilty to conspiracy to commit murder against Corey Lal in exchange for the Crown dropping the charges of first degree murder against him. Le was sentenced to 12 years in prison, but Justice Austin Cullen gave Le credit for his time served in jail awaiting to be tried, which shortened his sentence. In December 2013, Haevishcer's former girlfriend known as KM due to a court order testified for the Crown that she helped the killers clean the handguns used in the massacre at her apartment. KM testified that members of the Red Scorpions never spoke about their criminal activities and instead used markers on an erasable board to communicate. She testified on the afternoon of 19 October 2007 that Haevischer wrote "people died" on the board to tell his brother Justin what had happened. KM testified that she and Justin Haevischer burned the clothing that the killers were wearing on the same afternoon of the massacre and that Haevsicher put the cellphones of the killers into a pot of boiling water. On 12 December 2013, KM testified: "If the innocent people hadn't died, this wouldn't have been such a huge thing". KM testified that the police scrutiny after the massacre had caused tensions within the Red Scorpions and that Johnston punched out Le in a fight in her apartment. KM stated: "They got into a heated argument and I think it was because the heat was starting to come on us again over this murder shit and then Matt punched Mike out. They cracked a wall in my apartment and...they were like getting into the hallway and I was like fuck why do you guys always do these at my fucking houses?" KM testified that she was told by those who had committed the massacre that Chris Mohan was seen in the hallway and that: “And Matt grabbed him and threw him in, and he’s like ‘I’m not a part of it. I don’t know these guys. I’m not their friend.’ It wasn’t supposed to happen like this". About Schellenberg's murder, KM testified: "And then somebody saw Ed Schellenberg was hiding … somewhere and scared for his life. So they brought him out and put him with the other guys all facing one way so they weren’t looking at the guys".

On 11 March 2014, a Red Scorpion gangster who turned Crown's evidence, known only as "Person Y" due to a court order, testified for the Crown. Person Y testified that about Johnston: "He was happy...proud you could say. He said there was lots of bodies. It was like one after the other...that he had to pull someone in". Person Y testified that Bacon was the driving force behind the massacre, saying that he had first wanted to have Corey Lal killed, saying "At that point, Jamie wanted to put the hurt on him and finish him off, kill him. He had to be killed. If we don't now go do something to him it's going to make the whole group look weak". Person Y testified that the murder plot "morphed" as Bacon decided to not only kill Lal, but also rob the residents of unit 1505 of all their money and drugs. Person Y testified that he backed out of the plot because "too many things could go wrong", and that Bacon assigned Johnston and "person x" to execute his plans.

On 8 April 2014, Michael Le who had turned Crown's evidence as part of his plea bargain testified that he made $125,000 per month as a drug dealer. Le testified that Johnston had told him on the day of the massacre at a meeting at a shopping plaza that he did not plan to kill Narong who happened to arrive at unit 1505 after the killers had entered. Le testified: "I told him that `you’re a fucking idiot. Why you guys killed so many people?’ And his exact words to me were: `Mike – they saw our faces. We had no choice.’". He testified that he founded the Red Scorpions with Narong at the youth detention center and that he along with the other Red Scorpions worshipped Guan Gong, the Chinese god of gangsters.

Le testified that he had met Corey Lal in August 2007 in an attempt to mediate his dispute with the Bacon brothers. He further testified that Jamie Bacon was angry with him for meeting Lal and that: "He was kind of upset that I met Corey without him being present. Jamie said to me that basically that kid’s a little zeek, he’s a little bitch. I’m going to jack him...He shouldn’t be working in our town. We run this town.". The last witness for the Crown was the Rogers technician David Mak who testified that the accused were using their cell phones in the vicinity of the Balmoral Tower on 19 October 2007. On 20 May 2014, the Crown Attorney Mark Levitz concluded his case for the prosecution after calling 73 witnesses. On 7 July 2014, Buck attacked KM as a witness, calling her a career criminal with no respect for the truth who committed perjury for the Crown because she was angry with her ex-boyfriend Haevischer. Likewise, Buck attacked Michael Le as a witness, calling him a self-interested career criminal who made a plea bargain with the Crown for a lesser sentence.

On 2 October 2014 Haevischer and Johnston were convicted of six counts of first degree murder for their role in the massacre. Johnston and Haevischer launched an appeal of the verdict, alleging that the police misconduct ensured an unfair trial, and by alleging that being denied bail and being held in jail awaiting the trial was too tough for them. On 19 November 2014, Justice Catherine Wedge dismissed the appeal, ruling that the police misconduct did not affect the trial and nor did their jail conditions. On 12 December 2014, Johnston and Haevischer were sentenced to life imprisonment with no chance of parole for 25 years. In a victim impact statement, Mohan stated: "The courts of B.C. has set a verdict that is loud and clear to gangsters who think they can walk into innocent people's homes, steal the precious and innocent lives of their children, that they will be dealt with the highest consequences". Johnston laughed and grinned as Mohan read out her victim impact statement. Neither of the convicted chose to make a statement to the courtroom. Mohan said of the silence of the killers: "I don't think they are man enough to do that...they know what they did and I wanted to tell them today that when I received Christopher in casket what it was like. And that's why they didn't address the court, because what they can say? They know what they've done."

In December 2015, Sek made a plea bargain with the Crown where he admitted that he helped the killers enter unit 1505 in exchange for serving one year in prison. Mohan told the court in a victim impact statement: "Mr. Sek, had you not participated in this crime my son would have never been delivered to me in a casket." On 23 September 2016, Justice Kathleen Ker who was overseeing the case against Jamie Bacon, moved the trial for Bacon, which was supposed to begin in October 2016, to March 2018. Ker ordered a stay in proceedings in 2017 because of the police misconduct "contravened fundamental notions of justice and undermined the integrity of the justice system to the degree [the judge] could not permit the case to be tried." On December 1, 2017, Ker ordered a stay on the proceedings against Bacon because the way that Brassington and the other detectives handed the case. Ker stated she had serious concerns about "...the manner in which the police handled aspects of privileged and confidential information". The Crown appealed, and the appeals court ruled that the case could continue.

In 2019, Brassington, Attew, and Michaud were all found guilty of various charges of misconduct for their handling of the Surrey Six case. On January 19, 2019, the disgraced Brassington made a plea bargain with the Crown, where he made guilty pleas to charges of breach of trust and compromising the integrity and safety of a witness in exchange for a lesser sentence. At his sentencing, Brassington cried in the courtroom as he admitted that his affair with "Jane Doe 1" had ruined his career, led to his marriage ending in divorce and the estrangement of his children, saying: "As a dad I shouldn't have done this. As a husband I shouldn't have done this. As a cop I shouldn't have done this". Brassington stated about "Jane Doe" that: "I treated her like a girlfriend. I didn't mean to fall in love with her". The journalist Rhianna Schunk who attended the sentencing described Brassington as a broken man who between his sobs seemed to have much self-pity for himself as he sought to portray himself as a victim, claiming that the affair was caused by work-related stress. Brassington maintained amid his sobs and tears that his job stress was such that he had no choice but have sex with an attractive 22-year old model despite his best intentions. Michaud and Attew were convicted under the RCMP Act for failing to "maintain law and order" by not reporting Brassington's affair to his superiors despite knowing about it. Attew was also sanctioned for an incident in April 2009 when he kissed and groped the girlfriend of "person x" in an attempt to seduce her. Attew was sentenced to six months of house arrest. The Crown dropped the charges against the Mountie Paul Johnson on 5 March 2019 as he was dying from Hodgkin's lymphoma. Despite divorcing him, Brassington's ex-wife wrote a character reference letter for him blaming the RCMP for his actions, saying he was suffering from PTSD as a result of his job stress. On 11 September 2019, Justin Lee Haevischer, the younger brother of Cody Haevischer and also a Red Scorpion, was killed in a gang-related shooting. On 9 October 2019, the RCMP Commissioner, Brenda Lucki, writing on behalf of the Public Safety Minister, Ralph Goodale, rejected Brassington's request that the Crown pay his $255,383 legal bill relating to his case. Sek was ordered deported back to his native Cambodia in October 2019 on the account of his lengthy criminal record in Canada, including his involvement in the Surrey Six massacre.

In November 2019, Attew sued several figures in the RCMP and the British Columbia Attorney General's office. Attew, who began his career as a Mountie in April 1991, alleged that he was suffering from overwork, stress, and substance abuse relating to alcohol when he was assigned to the Surrey Six case in 2007 over his protests. Attew's lawsuit alleged: "The plaintiff expressed to his supervisors on many different occasions that he was having an extremely difficult time coping with the requirements that the job entailed and had turned to using alcohol as a means to do so, but was told there was no room for failure — that the Surrey Six investigation was a matter of national priority and he was to do whatever was required of him to solve the terrible crime". He alleged that he was unjustly convicted in January 2019 and his life was being threatened by underworld figures connected to the Red Scorpions. A response filed by the Department of Justice in November 2019 stated Attew had pleaded guilty in January 2019 to misconduct such as making sexual advances towards a female witness and that "the plaintiff’s suggestion that he only pleaded guilty ‘in order to avoid the financial burden of defending the charges would have caused him if taken to trial’ amounts to an impermissible collateral attack on his conviction."

The Surrey Six case ended on July 8, 2020, when the Crown made a plea bargain where the first-degree murder charges against Jamie Bacon were dropped in exchange for him pleading guilty to counselling murder regarding the massacre. On September 10, 2020, Justice Ker sentenced Bacon to 18 years with credit for the 11 years he served in jail awaiting trial, meaning that Bacon was released in 2026. Mohan's passionate appeals to Ker to overturn the joint submission by the Crown and the defense counsel for the plea bargain and impose a life sentence on Bacon were ignored. Ker stated that the "egregious misconduct" of the Mounties investigating the case with Brassington sleeping with a key witness as the reason for her refusal to impose a life sentence on Bacon. Ker stated that because of the "egregious misconduct" of Brassington and the rest of the detectives that 18 years in prison with credit for time served in jail was the most severe sentence she could impose on Bacon. Mohan was profoundly disappointed with Bacon's sentence, which she felt was far too lenient, saying: "Mr. Bacon gets to return home to his mother's arms. Today we celebrated his life...his rights...instead of celebrating Christopher. I don't know what tomorrow brings...but today is really, really difficult to accept. I want to respect the process, but I think the process is not respecting us in return."

On 24 August 2021, Attew again sued the RCMP, alleging his life was in danger because of his role in the Surrey Six case and that the RCMP commissioner Brenda Lucki had failed to respond to his requests for police protection. Sek who was dying of cancer was ordered released from prison in January 2022. Despite being ordered deported to Cambodia in 2019, Sek was still living in Canada in 2022 and made it clear that he intended to stay in Canada. In October 2022, the lawyers for Haevischer and Johnston launched an appeal to the Supreme Court of Canada, arguing that the case against their clients was flawed because the investigating detectives were having sex with female witnesses including the girlfriends of Haevsicher and Johnston. In a filing to the Supreme Court, the lawyers for Haevischer and Johnston wrote: "The officers endangered the safety of these young women, lied to their superiors, and manipulated overtime and expense claims to cover up their alcohol-fuelled revelry". The same filing complained that both Johnston and Haevischer were denied bail after their arrests in April 2009 and during their time in jail were subjected to "conditions of confinement akin to torture for more than a year — including an always-lit cell smeared with mucous, feces and blood — isolating them from meaningful human contact and limiting their access to counsel. The conditions were characterized by the trial judge as cruel and unusual punishment.". Both Haevischer and Johnston appealed their convictions all the way to the Supreme Court. Johnston died of cancer in December 2022, but on 28 April 2023 the Supreme Court of Canada ordered that Haevischer should have the chance to appeal his conviction before the Supreme Court of British Columbia, stating that misconduct of the Mounties justified a new hearing for Haevischer.

On 29 May 2023, Justice Ann Marie McDonald ruled in favour of Brassington's request to have the Crown pay his $255,383 legal bill. McDonald ruled: "The determinative issue on this application for judicial review is whether Mr. Brassington had a fair process for the consideration of his further request for (legal assistance at public expense) funding. I have concluded that he did not. Mr. Brassington did not have a timely consideration of his request nor did the minister have the full record of the information Mr. Brassington provided in support of his (legal assistance at public expense) request". McDonald also ruled that Brassington should not have to pay his own legal bills because: "the failure of the RCMP to forward all the materials Mr. Brassington submitted...to the minister was a breach of procedural fairness.” McDonald ruled that the Crown should consider paying Brassington's legal fees for the reasons she outlined.

Haevischer's hearing before the Supreme Court of British Columbia was scheduled for 7 October 2024. Justice Martha Devin ruled in August 2024 that transcripts of the interviews with "Jane Doe 1" be made public at Haevischer's hearing under the grounds: "The Surrey Six murders, and the investigation that followed them, continue to loom large over the public consciousness. The allegations of state misconduct involved in this case are extraordinary, and there is a strong public interest in uncovering the truth of those allegations. This interest is heightened by the nature of the allegations, and in particular the need for disclosure of all relevant materials to ensure that the allegations’ seriousness is fully uncovered and litigated." The hearing for Haevischer was later pushed back to 4 November 2024.

The hearings began in Vancouver on 4 November 2024 with Simon Buck, the lawyer for Haevischer, seeking to overturn the verdict and the first witness being RCMP assistant commissioner David Teboul. On 8 November 2024, Michaud testified that he lied to police investigators in 2010 when he denied Brassington had an affair with Jane Doe 1. Michaud also denied sleeping with Jane Doe 1 during a visit to Toronto in 2009. During a cross-examination by Buck, Michuad admitted lying to detectives, saying “I wanted to protect our investigation”. Buck responded by saying: "It’s more like you wanted to protect Brassington. You wanted to hide the truth.” Michuad answered: "“Yes, to protect our team, not just Brassington". Michuad testified that during a visit to Toronto in 2009 that he and Paul Johnson were drinking with Jane Doe at Jack Astor’s Bar and Grill and that she had made sexual advances towards him afterwards at her apartment. Michuad claimed to have resisted her advances, saying he was a happily married man who just become a father. Michuad denied lying to the Ontario Provincial Police when he failed to mention the visit, saying he just forgot. In his cross-examination, Buck expressed skepticism about this claim, saying that by Michaud's own admission he had an extremely attractive woman made advances towards him over a course of a single evening, which he somehow just forgot when talking to detectives a year later. Buck, citing a statement by Jane Doe, gave a different version of events where according to her she went with Jonhson and Michuad to the Brass Rail strip club; that both Michuad and Johnson boasted to her about the number of "threesomes" they were involved when they were hockey players; and Michuad had sex with her at her apartment. When Buck told Michuad that he was "suggesting" that he had sex with Jane Doe, Michuad, visibly angry, shouted at Buck: "I’m suggesting you are 100 per cent wrong".

== Books ==
- Langton, Jerry (2013). The Notorious Bacon Brothers : inside gang warfare on Vancouver streets. Etobicoke, Ont.: J. Wiley and Sons Canada. ISBN 978-1118388679.
