= 856 gang =

856
- Founding location: Aldergrove, BC
- Years active: 2003-Present
- Territory: Lower Mainland, Yellowknife
- Ethnicity: White Canadian
- Membership (est.): TBD
- Criminal activities: Arms trafficking, Drug trafficking, Extortion, murder
- Allies: Red Scorpions
- Rivals: Hells Angels, UN (gang),

The 856 Gang is a gang active in the Northwest Territories and British Columbia area. The gang is named after a telephone prefix of Aldergrove, BC.

== Origins ==
The 856 gang first emerged as a youth gang in Aldergrove, BC. They were notorious for physical assault, disruption and vandalism. The RCMP denounced them as a group of 'punks' to the media at first sight. Until September, 2007, they had made ties to a man named Len Pelletier of the Hells Angels, who claimed to have relation to one member.

During that year, Len's vehicle was shot and the 856 were all under suspicion by law enforcement. About 8 core members were put under police supervision by Officer Richard Konarski, an inspector for the Langley RCMP. A profile was constructed of the 856, focusing on six friends and family members between the ages of 15 and 18—all of which were arrested that same year. Some went to jail, others transferred to separate schools. Konarski and many others, including their former principal, believed that was the end of the 856.

Later, the gang was rediscovered, now with weapons, drug connections and a more sophisticated criminal organization.

== History ==
Jason Francis Wallace was charged with attempted murder, in a 2008 stabbing that occurred at a Grad Party.

In 2013, the gang was rediscovered by the RCMP in Yellowknife and Alberta, dealing multimillions of dollars' worth of cocaine, firearms and cash. Six search warrants were placed on their property. In early 2014, 12 individuals were charged for dealing drugs for the 856 gang. By July 2014, $400,000 worth of drugs were seized from the gang in an apartment building located on the 4600-block of 236th Street in Langley.

In August 2014, the gang was targeted by Project Gloom, and had been found to send another crew to sell cocaine and collect drug debts left behind by the previous gang members. This had led to an April 2015, drive-by shooting. Two of the gangsters were arrested for attempting to murder one of their own. Following such, the gang sent yet another group of replacements north, which ended in 23 suspects arrested due to two search warrants placed in July 2015. Several loaded firearms, cash, cocaine, MDMA and heroin were seized from the gang in Whitehorse.

An 856 gang member, was later charged in the murder of Bob Green, a long time Hells Angels gang member in 2016, while another member was caught with 126 grams of crack cocaine and two digital scales in his suitcase. RCMP also found cash, marijuana and ecstasy pills in his apartment in Yellowknife.

Later, RCMP had raided a townhouse in Whitehorse and found handguns, rifles, rocks of cocaine (enough for up to 90 individual sales), ecstasy, $20,000 in cash, ammunition, and black T-shirts emblazoned with "856" in white lettering.

In 2017, Jason Francis Wallace, pleaded guilty to manslaughter of Hell's Angel Bob Green. He was sentenced to six years in jail. 856 associate, Shaun Clary's body was dismembered as a result of retaliation of Bob's murder.

Today, the gang is thought to be rivals of the Hells Angels who were formerly in alliance with them.
