= Brothers Keepers (gang) =

Organized crime group originating from Vancouver, British Columbia, Canada

- Founded: 2016
- Founder: Gavinder "Gavin" Singh Grewal
- Founding location: Greater Vancouver, British Columbia, Canada
- Years active: 2016 – present
- Territory: Controlled Territory: Canada; Washington; Alaska; Areas of influence: Oregon; Australia; New Zealand; Fiji; UAE
- Ethnicity: Mainly Punjabi Canadian with many members of various other ethnicities
- Membership: approx. 200 members (2020); approx. 700 associates (2020)
- Activities: murder, racketeering, loan sharking, illegal gambling, arms trafficking, money laundering, drug trafficking, illicit cigarette trade, extortion, assault, robbery, contract killing
- Allies: Clan del Golfo Independent Soldiers; Hells Angels; Driftwood Crips
- Rivals: Red Scorpions; United Nations; Kang crime family(BIBO gang); Bishnoi gang

The Brothers Keepers is an organized crime group based in British Columbia, Canada, that is engaged in organized crime across Canada and abroad. Originating in the Greater Vancouver area, the group has expanded across Canada since its founding and has established relationships with other transnational organized crime groups.

The Brothers Keepers are believed by the Royal Canadian Mounted Police (RCMP) in British Columbia to be among the most 'prominent and violent' gangs in B.C.

== History ==
=== Origins ===
The Brothers Keepers were founded in 2016 by Gavinder Singh Grewal and an unnamed dozen or so other founders who remain as the core members, with most of the gang's membership and leadership made up of former Red Scorpions members and leadership. The dozen or so core founding members act as leaders of the group, each with their own Cell in their control, their own criminal affiliations and territories of varying sizes. Grewal was rumoured to have taken the gang's name from a line uttered by Wesley Snipes’ gangster character in the 1991 movie New Jack City.

=== Assassination of Cetin Koç ===
Founding Brothers Keepers member Harpreet Singh Majhu and Orosman Jr. Garcia-Arevalo, who operated under the Kang faction of the gang, were hired to take out Iranian-born Turkish drug kingpin Cetin Koç in Dubai. On May 4, 2016, Majhu and Garcia-Arevalo ambushed Koç as he was sitting in a vehicle in downtown Dubai. Koç was shot nine times with two silenced pistols and was killed instantly. Majhu and Garcia-Areval then boarded a flight out of Dubai, departing before they were named suspects by the Dubai Police Force. Both men were murdered shortly after the assassination. On May 11, 2016, Garcia-Arevalo was found dead in a blueberry field outside of Abbotsford. On June 10, 2016, Majhu was found dead in a burned-out vehicle just outside of Agassiz, British Columbia.

=== Death of Gavinder Singh Grewal ===
Brothers Keepers founder Gavinder Singh Grewal was found shot dead in his North Vancouver penthouse, after his body was discovered by his visiting brother Mandeep on December 22, 2017. Police believed this murder was in retaliation for the murders of several Red Scorpion leaders in the months prior, such as Red Scorpion gang founder Konaam Shirzad, Randeep "Randy" Kang of the Kang crime family and Ibrahim Amjad Ibrahim. The Grewal murder remains unsolved; however, police released surveillance footage and alleged that the suspects were a South Asian man approximately 20 to 25 years old and wearing a black jacket and a white shirt and the other was described as South Asian, 25 to 30 years old, with a beard and wearing a toque and a dark jacket.

In 2019, drill rapper Lolo Lanski (Ekene Anigbo) released a diss track titled "DEDMAN" in which he taunts the Brothers Keepers and the deceased Gavinder Grewal. One section of the song features excerpts from the 911 call made by Gavinder's brother after finding his body. Vancouver Police launched an investigation to discover how Anigbo acquired the 911 recording. Anigbo is associated with the Kang crime family, a historic enemy of the Brothers Keepers.

=== Conflicts with other gangs ===
The Brothers Keepers are currently in conflict with the United Nations gang as well as the coalition of the Red Scorpions gang and Kang crime family, which is also known as the BIBO (Blood In Blood Out) gang.

29-year-old Birinderjeet Justin “B Man” Bhangu, a well-known Brothers Keepers and Wolfpack gangster, was gunned down on March 13, 2017, in the parking lot of a Surrey Comfort Inn hotel. He is believed to be the first Brother's Keeper targeted by a rival gang. Days earlier, on March 9, leading Red Scorpions Navdip Sanghera, 32, and Harjit Singh Mann, 49, were shot to death in East Vancouver in a hit authorities at the time speculated may have caused the killing of Birinderjeet four days later. Navdip Sanghera had been a member of the Sanghera crime family and was close with the Bacon Brothers.

Matthew Navas-Rivas was on the annual Brothers Keepers yacht cruise around the Vancouver waterfront just days before he was shot to death on July 25, 2018. He and his crew of Troy McKinnon and Cody Sleigh were Independent Soldiers members, who, along with the rest of the Independent Soldiers gang and the Wolfpack alliance, would become rivals with the Red Scorpions and BIBO gang while aligning themselves with the Brothers Keepers gang. Troy McKinnon and Cody Sleigh were also found gunned down on January 15, 2018, and July 21, 2020, respectively. On January 20, 2021, Kang crime family (BIBO gang) member and Red Scorpion Dyllan “Pistol P” Petrin was arrested for the murder of Independent Soldier Cody Sleigh.

On October 18, 2018, Mandeep Grewal, brother of Brothers Keepers founder Gavinder Grewal, was shot dead in front of a bank in Abbotsford. Mandeep was not involved in the criminal lifestyle, according to the police and had no criminal record, according to the Vancouver Sun; he was considered an innocent victim in the gang War.

On February 1, 2019, Bikramjit "Bicky" Khakh was gunned down in Surrey. He was a former associate of notorious Punjabi Mafia co-leader Manny Buttar. He was with a friend and fellow Brothers Keepers gangster, Harb Dhaliwal, when the two were shot at in Richmond on December 21, 2018.

On September 10, 2019, a high-profile Red Scorpion who had been convicted of helping his gang mates and brother destroy evidence in the Surrey Six Massacre case was shot to death outside an Aldergrove fast-food restaurant in Langley. His brother Cody Haevischer was convicted in the Surrey Six murders. Justin Lee Haevischer, 33, was believed to have been blasted by two different shooters outside of a McDonald's at 264th Street and 56th Avenue about 8 p.m. Police who viewed the video of Justin Haevischer's execution said it was disturbing and traumatizing, according to the Vancouver Sun. Red Scorpions gang leader Jamie Bacon would blame the Brothers Keepers gang for his murder, according to a leaked audio file, as per the Vancouver Sun.

On January 7, 2021, Anees Mohammed, a drug dealer associated with both the Brothers Keepers and Wolfpack Alliance, who had once been associated with the rival Dhak crime group and notorious Dhak group gangster Jujhar Singh Khunkhun almost a decade before, was murdered in a shooting in Richmond. Police suspect that the shooting was retaliation for the murder of one of the Kang crime family's leading figures, Gary Kang, the day prior.

On April 17, 2021, Brothers Keepers member Harpreet "Harb" Singh Dhaliwal was gunned down outside Cardero's restaurant on April 17, 2021. Harb Dhaliwal's brother, Meninder and another man allegedly chased the assailant, stabbing him in the eye. The assailant, Francois Gauthier, was sentenced to life imprisonment in June 2022. Police at the time suspected that in retaliation for the Dhaliwal murder, high-level UN gangster Todd Gouwenberg, 46, was fatally shot 3 days later on April 20, 2021, at about 9 a.m. as he arrived to work out at the Langley Sportsplex in Langley.

Brothers Jaskeert Singh Kalkat and Gurkeert Singh Kalkat were murdered only nine days apart in May 2021. Jaskeert was a prime suspect in the murder of United Nations gang member Karman Singh Grewal at Vancouver International Airport on May 10, 2021. Two days before the killing of Gurkeert Kalkat, a former affiliate of the Brothers Keepers who left with the Kang faction was gunned down in Nanaimo, British Columbia. Yasin Khan was a BIBO gang and Red Scorpion member and was believed to be targeted by the Brothers Keepers.

On February 8, 2022, Brothers Keepers member Juvraj Singh Jabal, 24, and a woman in the car with him, later identified as Jasmine Lindstrom, 20, were shot. Juvraj succumbed to his injuries on February 10, while Lindstrom survived. His murder was suspected retaliation for the killing of United Nations gang member Jimi "Slice" Sandhu, who was shot at a villa in Phuket, Thailand, days earlier. Almost two years later, in January 2024, Jabal's alleged killer, Yusuf Kontos,24, of Ontario, was arrested. Former Canadian army corporal Matthew Dupre would be extradited to Thailand and convicted for the killing of Sandhu in 2024.

Meninder Dhaliwal was shot dead alongside Satindera Gill, who was identified as Meninder's friend who was not involved in the gangster lifestyle, according to authorities. Both were ambushed and shot dead in Whistler in July 2022. A week before the murder of Meninder Dhaliwal and his friend Satindera Gill on July 14, the body of longtime UN gangster Christopher Irwin was found in Burnaby. He had been targeted twice in previous months but survived both attempts on his life. Police believed the Brothers Keepers gang had targeted him. Meninder Dhaliwal was the second main suspect, along with Jaskeert Kalkat as the men who murdered Karman Grewal, according to police sources. Meninder's alleged killers, Gursimran Sahota and Tanvir Khak, were apprehended by the RCMP within a couple of hours. One of them, Gursimran Sahota, had close ties to Karman. Both Sahota and Tanvir Khak are alleged UN members.

On September 12, 2022, Brothers Keepers member Sameh Ali “S Man” Mohammed was gunned down in Brampton, Ontario. Police speculated that Mohammed's killing was retaliation for the murder of United Nations gang member Arman Singh Dhillon in Oakville the month prior. On April 6, 2023, Halton Regional Police Service announced three arrests in the murder of Arman Dhillon. Three alleged Brothers Keepers affiliates, Karnveer Singh Sandhu, 29, of Edmonton, Joseph Richard Whitlock, 30, of Pickering and Kulvir Singh Bhatia, 25, of Calgary, were arrested and charged with first-degree murder and attempted murder. However, in a dramatic turn of events, a judge on October 24, 2025, ordered a stay of proceedings and effectively dismissed the first-degree murder and attempted murder charges against Kulvir Bhatia, Joseph Richard Whitlock and Karnveer Sandhu, citing egregious misconduct by staff at Maplehurst Correctional Complex that undermined the integrity of the prosecution's case.

Two long-time United Nations gangsters and brothers were gunned down 2 months apart in 2023. Amarpreet "Chucky" Samra was killed in the early hours of Sunday, May 28, outside a wedding he was leaving. Ravinder "Robby" Samra was gunned down on Thursday, July 27, 2023, outside one of his Richmond homes. Police suspected the killers of both gangsters to belong to the Brothers Keepers gang, according to the Vancouver Sun.

The high-profile killing of Harpreet “Harp” Uppal in Edmonton, along with his 11-year-old son Gavin, who was an innocent bystander in 2023, made national headlines in Canada as the killing of an innocent child was condemned and as it also outlined the national reach of the BC gang conflict as the killing was suspected to be retaliation for the killing of United Nations gangster Parmvir Chahil in Toronto the day before. Edmonton police would confirm that Harp Uppal was a "high-level organized crime figure in Alberta" and that he was closely associated with the Brothers Keepers.

On January 20, 2024, UN gangster Amritpal "Amrit" Saran, who had been involved in a 2020 gang shootout, was gunned down in his vehicle in the underground parking garage of the Seven Oaks shopping Centre in Abbotsford. On January 23, 2024, Red Scorpion gangster and Kang crime family member Johnson "BIBO Buddha" Viet Anh Do was shot dead in Burnaby. Both Amritpal and Johnson were believed by police to be targeted by the Brothers Keepers.

In January 2024, Brothers Keepers-affiliated rapper T-Sav (Tyrel Nguyen) was sentenced to life imprisonment for the murders of Kang crime family member Randeep "Randy" Kang and, in another case, university student Jagvir Singh Malhi, whose death is suspected to be a case of mistaken identity.

Barinder "Shrek" Dhaliwal, a leading figure in the Brothers Keepers and a well-known figure in Canada's organized crime landscape, was the target of an assassination attempt on September 21, 2024, in Langley, when assailants opened fire on Dhaliwal. He was alleged to have returned fire, resulting in the death of one of the attackers, Johnathan Hebrada-Walters, 38, from Edmonton and known to police. Dhaliwal sustained injuries during the incident but survived. Authorities believe this event is linked to the ongoing gang conflicts in the region. On June 3, 2025, Barinder was arrested by the Integrated Homicide Investigation Team (IHIT) and charged the following day with multiple firearms offences, including possession of a loaded firearm, unauthorized possession in a vehicle, and possession while prohibited, in connection with the September 21, 2024, shooting in Langley; however, no murder or manslaughter charges were laid.

2026 Gang War with the UN Gang

On January 9 2026, 28 year old Navpreet Singh Dhaliwal, a Brothers Keepers gangster who had been charged with conspiracy to commit murder was shot to death in an Abbotsford home in the 3200-block of Siskin Drive just after 12:35 p.m. Dhaliwal was the subject of a public warning by Abbotsford police in August 2024 after he and another man, Anmol Sandhu, were released on bail pending trial. At the time, police said the pair, who planned to live in west Abbotsford, posed a significant public safety risk. The Abbotsford men were involved in a large-scale drug trafficking investigation launched by police in late 2022. During the investigation, police searched several homes in Abbotsford and Surrey, and seized several kilograms of illicit drugs, including fentanyl and cocaine, cash and firearms. Evidence uncovered during the drug investigation prompted police to launch Project High Table, focused on Dhaliwal and Sandhu, who they alleged were planning a murder. The men were arrested in February 2024 on two counts of conspiracy to commit murder. They also faced drug trafficking charges and firearm offences. Three days later on January 12 2026, another Brothers Keepers gangster named Naseem Ali Mohammed also known as "Lil Man" due to his short stature or his rapper alias "Certi2x", was found shot dead inside of a burning home in Surrey, a short time after he returned to Canada from the Middle East. Naseem believed to have been shot before the house at 12732 56th Ave was set ablaze, a photograph that appears to be Mohammed, was also after he was shot, with blood all over the right side of his face. In days before his death, Mohammed, a rapper who also sometimes used the name "Wlatt", began posting video again on his Instagram account showing him inside a vehicle driving around Surrey. Since he was released from a U.S. prison in fall 2024, he had been living in Dubai and kept a low profile, but he also remained a suspect in several gang murder cases in B.C. and another province according to a U.S. Border Patrol officer. Mohammed spent almost three years in a Washington state prison after he pleaded guilty to armed robbery in April 2022 for pulling a gun on two strangers in a Seattle-area hookah lounge several months earlier. He was sentenced to 41 months in jail. Charged in Ontario in 2019 with unlawful confinement, assault, pointing a firearm, uttering death threats, theft and robbery, Mohammed fled town while on bail at his parents’ Surrey home, the charges were later stayed. While Mohammed was in jail, his older brother Sameh was shot to death in Brampton, Ont., in September 2022. At the time, Sgt. Brenda Winpenny of B.C.’s Combined Forces Special Enforcement Unit said the elder Brothers Keeper had fled to Ontario because of threats against him in B.C. When he was just 21, Mohammed travelled to Russia along with Toronto rapper Pressa (rapper) and was featured in a YouTube video of the trip. On January 22 2026, Dilraj Singh Gill of the BIBO gang and Red Scorpions was gunned down in Burnaby near the 3700-block of Canada Way just before 5:30 p.m. A burning vehicle was found in the 5000-block of Buxton Street shortly after the shooting.

== Activities ==
The gang is suspected to engage in criminal activities such as loan sharking, money laundering, arms trafficking, operating illegal gambling houses, murder, racketeering and extortion and the gang is also believed by authorities to traffic bulk quantities of Cocaine, Cannabis (drug), MDMA, Heroin, Opiate painkillers, Xanax, Adderall, Fentanyl and Methamphetamine across the nation as well as exporting to nations abroad. Investigations also highlighted the gang's strategy to expand into new markets within the country and abroad, utilizing tactics such as reduced drug prices for street-level traffickers they supply, branded products (such as purple fentanyl), and increased potency of drugs they supply.

== Allies ==
The Brothers Keepers are currently closely allied to the Independent Soldiers, a gang which originates from South Vancouver and is another gang which was founded as a majority Punjabi-Canadian gang and rapidly became ethnically diverse, with numerous members of varying ethnicities joining. The two gangs already had a close relationship due to their long alliance in the Wolfpack prior to the Red Scorpions splitting into the Brothers Keepers and then the remaining Red Scorpions splitting from the Wolfpack.

The gang also has a close alliance with the Hells Angels, including its 'Hardside' Chapter, located in Surrey. High-profile Brothers Keepers members Ty Quesnelle, Harb Dhaliwal, and Barinder Dhaliwal attended the funeral of Hells Angels member Suminder Singh "Allie" Grewal after he was gunned down at a Starbucks drive-through in south Surrey on August 2, 2019, a murder which the rival United Nations gang was believed to be responsible for.

The Brothers Keepers also have a close relationship with the Driftwood Crips, based in Toronto's Jane and Finch neighbourhood. Several rappers associated with the Driftwood Crips have made references to the Brothers Keepers in various rap songs. According to the Vancouver Sun: "The Driftwood Crips, who have been active in the drug-and-gun trade since the mid-1990s, have aligned with, and are running, drug lines for the Brothers Keepers, a B.C. outfit that is locked in a bloody Lower Mainland gang conflict with rivals from at least two other groups."

== Police Investigations and Arrests ==
=== 2017 ===
In 2017, authorities in British Columbia carried out Project Treachery, a major police operation that targeted organized crime and exposed the use of rural properties as covert staging grounds for gang-related violence across British Columbia. Conducted jointly by the Vancouver Police Department (VPD), the Combined Forces Special Enforcement Unit – British Columbia (CFSEU-BC), and other agencies, Project Treachery formed part of a broader initiative to combat escalating gang violence across the Lower Mainland in the mid-2010s. The operation focused primarily on violent organized crime groups involved in drug trafficking, firearms offenses, vehicle theft, and targeted killings.

In November 2017, after extensive surveillance and intelligence-gathering, police executed search warrants on several properties linked to gang activity. The most notable of these was a large rural farm property in Langley, British Columbia, located on 240th Street. While outwardly appearing to be a standard agricultural site, the farm served as a concealed hub for preparing targeted assassinations and facilitating organized criminal operations. When officers searched the property on November 13, 2017, they uncovered a substantial arsenal of weapons and equipment. The seizure included nine handguns, three assault-style rifles, two explosive devices, over six hundred rounds of ammunition, several sets of body armour, and eight stolen vehicles, which bore fraudulent or altered license plates. In addition to the weapons cache, police discovered more than five hundred marijuana plants, each plant yielding approximately a pound of cannabis per growth cycle, and related drug production equipment on the premises linked to cannabis trafficking.

The scale and nature of the items found at the farm suggested that the property was being used not merely as a drug grow-op or storage facility, but as a staging area where individuals could prepare for killings. The combination of stolen vehicles, explosives, firearms, ammunition, and protective gear pointed to a sophisticated infrastructure designed to support assassins, providing them with the means to commit violent acts while evading detection. The discovery of explosive weapons in particular was seen as deeply concerning by law enforcement, as it indicated a potential for more extreme violence than typically associated with Lower Mainland gang conflicts at the time.

The Langley farm bust was part of a larger coordinated effort, as Project Treachery aimed to disrupt multiple interconnected criminal groups involved in the region's ongoing gang wars. These included the Brothers Keepers gang and allied crime cells engaged in a violent struggle for dominance against rival organizations such as the Red Scorpions and their allies in the Kang crime family (BIBO gang), as well as the United Nations gang and their allies in the remnants of the Dhak-Duhre crime groups. Project Treachery coincided with, and complemented, other major police initiatives like Project Territory, which was a successful investigation into the BIBO gang and Red Scorpions gang drug trafficking organizations. These projects sought to dismantle the organizational capacity of these gangs, seize their assets, and stem the tide of gun violence that had increasingly placed the public at risk.

In the aftermath of the seizure, British Columbia's civil forfeiture office initiated legal proceedings to seize the Langley farm property on the grounds that it was acquired and used in furtherance of criminal activity. The government's position was that the property and its assets had been instrumental in enabling crimes ranging from illegal firearms possession and drug production to conspiracy to commit murder. The civil suit alleged that the owners of the property had either knowingly facilitated or turned a blind eye to these activities. Rather than proceeding through a full civil trial, the matter was resolved through a negotiated settlement. The owners of the property agreed to pay $220,000 to the provincial government. In exchange, the government abandoned its claim to seize the land and the constructed homes and barns outright. The settlement concluded the civil forfeiture process while allowing the property owners to retain title to the farm.

Project Treachery is considered a significant operation in the ongoing effort to disrupt organized crime in British Columbia. It provided evidence that criminal groups in the province had begun using rural properties as hidden operational hubs, allowing them to stockpile weapons, plan murders, and prepare for hits away from the surveillance and scrutiny of urban law enforcement. The case highlighted the adaptability of organized crime networks and underscored the need for continued vigilance and coordinated action among law enforcement agencies. The bust also demonstrated the utility of civil forfeiture as a tool for disrupting the infrastructure of organized crime, even in cases where criminal convictions are not secured against property owners.

=== 2021 ===
In 2021, 3 drug traffickers associated with what police called an 'extremely violent' gang were arrested in a large police operation spanning the province. For those charges, in April 2024, drug kingpin and Brothers Keepers gangster Amandeep "Aman" Singh Kang (unrelated to the BIBO gang) was sentenced to 11 years in prison for controlling a drug empire which trafficked cocaine, MDMA, heroin, fentanyl and methamphetamine in "substantial amounts" across British Columbia. When Kang and his alleged associates were arrested in 2021, police said they had seized numerous kilograms of drugs, as well as $50,000 in cash, multiple loaded firearms and lab equipment used to manufacture MDMA and methamphetamine. Along with Aman Kang of Vancouver, others arrested as a part of this drug trafficking network were two Brothers Keepers associates: Andrew Miguel Best, 21, of Vancouver Island and Dylan Robert, 22, of Surrey, as well as two females: Jannat Bibi Nadeem, 21, of Surrey and Moshmem Khanun Khan, 45, of Surrey.

=== 2024 ===
The RCMP's 18-month specialized Federal Serious and Organized Crime (FSOC) investigation into the Brothers Keepers gang concluded in February 2024 with eight Brothers Keepers gangsters being charged with various drug and firearms offences, including the dismantling of a large-scale drug lab which had several kilograms of Percocet, Oxycodone, Xanax, Adderall, Fentanyl and methamphetamine ready for shipment. The probe uncovered a murder plot conspiracy by alleged Brothers Keepers gangster Michael Manpreet Johal, which was allegedly targeting rival UN gangster Gagandeep “G Man” Sandhu, who ended up being killed. Johal would be charged with conspiracy to commit murder for allegedly plotting to have Sandhu murdered. Court filings alleged that Johal conspired with an associate identified only by the online PGP handle “johnwick7,” along with unnamed associates, in the plot to kill Sandhu.

Three other alleged Brothers Keepers gangsters who were accused of conspiring to murder five other rivals were also arrested, two Abbotsford men – Anmol Sandhu and Navpreet Dhaliwal, both 26 years old and a Surrey man, Gavinder Steven Siekham, 34 years old.

As part of the drug lab, a significant seizure included 356,000 pills, pill presses and an "industrial-sized drug lab in South Surrey, which could produce 60,000 pills an hour, meaning its operators were likely involved in exportation to Pacific island nations such as Australia and New Zealand, on top of production for the domestic market. Police also seized four illegal firearms, over 1,500 rounds of ammunition, and 168 kilograms of precursor chemicals containing fentanyl, benzodiazepines, methamphetamines and Carfentanil", highlighting the operation's scale and its conspiracy for international drug exportation into Australia, New Zealand and Fiji.

Arrested for the drug lab were Brothers Keepers gangsters Michael Manpreet Johal, Richard Sen, Jagdeep Singh Cheema, Michael David Rast, and Kevin Moebes. Jagdeep Cheema had once been an associate of Dhak group gangster Jujhar Khunkhun as well and was a member of the Dhak-Duhre group, a group which is closely allied with the UN gang; however, Cheema had allegedly switched allegiance to the Brothers Keepers/Wolfpack years ago.

== See also ==
- Indo-Canadian organized crime
