= Chop shop =

Criminal establishment

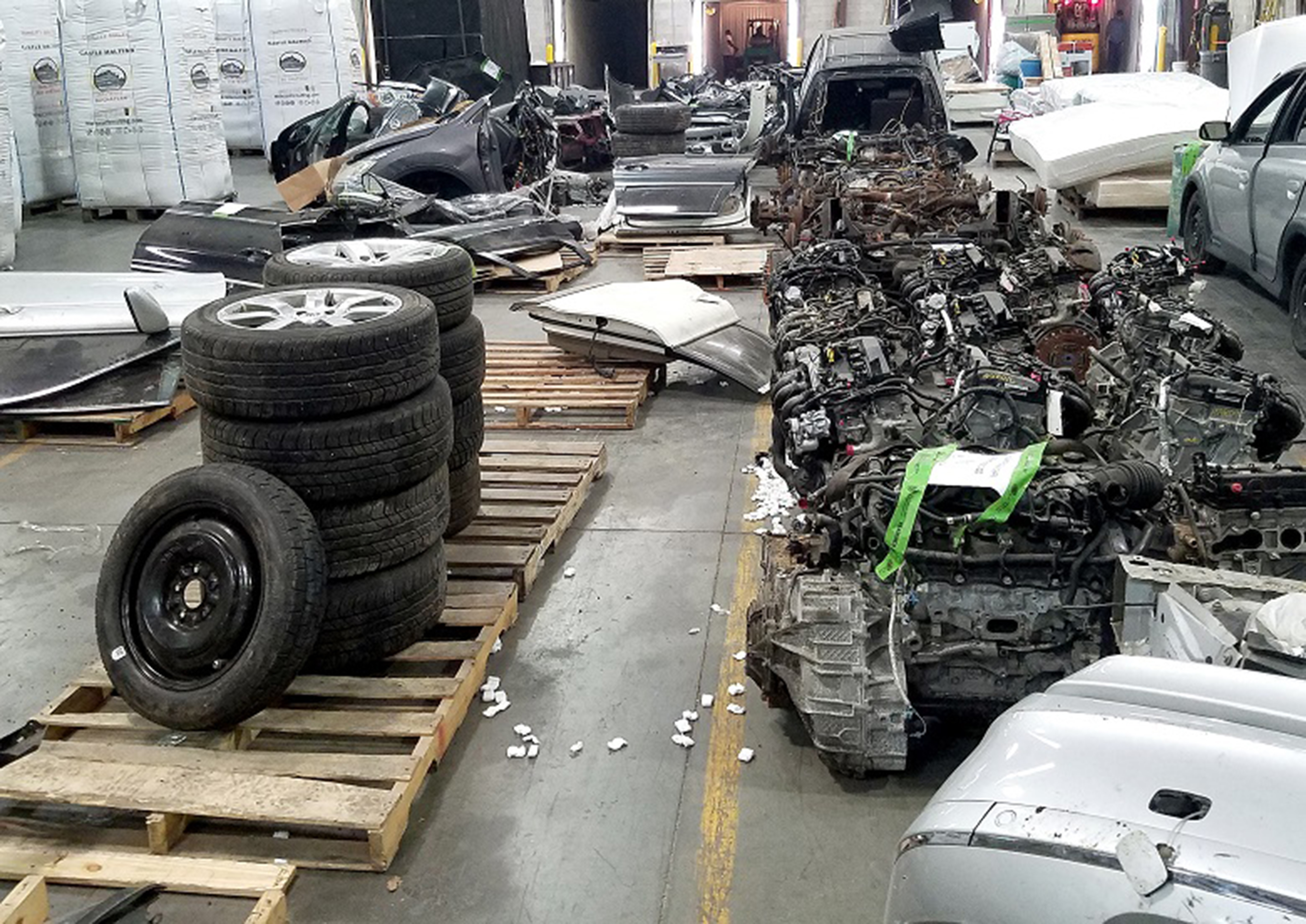
Stolen vehicles and automobile parts destined for Jordan, seized by the U.S. Customs and Border Protection at the port of Norfolk, Virginia

A chop shop is a business, often mimicking a body shop, that illicitly sells stolen motor vehicles or their parts for profit. Chop shops are often linked to car-theft rings as part of a broader organized crime enterprise.

In the United States, the federal Motor Vehicle Theft Law Enforcement Act of 1984 and Federal Anti-Car Theft Act of 1992, as well as U.S. Department of Transportation regulations issued under those acts, require automobile manufacturers to label many different auto components (with some exemptions for new automobiles with select anti-theft systems). Chop shop operators attempt to bypass these measure by modifying vehicle identification numbers or by falsifying the paperwork needed to make a legal sale (e.g. bill of sale, car title). A 1999 study commissioned by the U.S. Department of Justice's National Institute of Justice estimated that parts marking reduced the rate of professional car theft (with "between 33 and 158 fewer cars" being "stolen by professional thieves per 100,000 cars that were marked between 1987 and 1995"), the degree to which this inhibits chop shop operations is unclear.

== See also ==
- Carjacking
- Motor vehicle theft
- Pawn shop
