= Castle Fun Park =

Amusement park in British Columbia

- Previously known as Wonderland Amusement Park (1989-1998)
- Interactive map of Castle Fun Park
- Location: Abbotsford, British Columbia, Canada
- Coordinates: 49.0388°N 122.2235°W
- Status: Operating
- Opened: 1989, July
- Theme: castle; medieval architecture
- Website: https://castlefunpark.com/

Castle Fun Park is an amusement park located in Abbotsford, British Columbia, by the Trans-Canada Highway. The park is built like a castle resembling medieval architecture and includes many attractions and arcade games. The park is currently run by the Wiebe family.

== History ==
In 1988, Hank and Doreen Wiebe started construction for an amusement park on their recently purchased land in Abbotsford, and in July 1989 they opened it with the name "Wonderland Amusement Park". The park's buildings resembled medieval architecture. In 1998, they had to change the park's name into "Castle Fun Park" due to a name infringement of another amusement park in Ontario called Canada's Wonderland. Today, the park is operated still by the Wiebe family and have since added many new attractions and rides.

== 2021 Flooding ==
On November 15, 2021, the entire park was flooded and was closed shortly after. Despite the flood, the park's social media stayed "optimistic," posting on their Facebook on November 18, four days after the initial flooding, saying "...[we'll] keep coming back to faith, optimism, and even moments of laughter." In the same post, they stated that they were aiming for a reopening in early spring. On January 26, they posted a video on their Instagram showing the ruined state the park was in while still showing signs for the proposed reopening in early spring.

On Canada Day 2022, the park was officially reopened.

== Attractions ==
- Go Karts
- Laser Tag
- Arcade (including more than 200 arcade games)
- Bowling
- Wonder Farm Kid Zone – a part of the park with a variety of mini-rides made for children
- Bumper Cars
- Driving Range
- Shooting Gallery
- Typhoon – an immersive arcade ride
- Two indoor and one outdoor mini golf courses, including:
  - Underwater Adventure Golf – an underwater-themed course which was revamped after the 2021 flood
  - Jungle Adventure Golf – a jungle-themed mini-golf
  - An additional mini golf course called "Secret Garden Adventure Golf" was announced on the park's Instagram on February 3, 2023, and is currently under construction and being designed by the Imagination Corporation
- Animal Crackers / Jungle Jamboree (1989-2025) – an animatronic stage show of anthropomorphic, musical animals developed by Creative Presentations, Inc. of Schaumburg, Illinois on three stages consisting of:
  - Bob Wire and the B.O.Y.S. – a guitarist coyote with three prairie dogs (Butch, Oakley, and Yancy)
  - The Ape-Ology's – trio band of monkeys featuring Elsworth (chimp) on piano, Putnam (orangutan) on drums, and Albert (ape) on guitar
  - Patty Pachyderm and Mortimer D. Mouse – a comedic duo consisting of an elephant pianist and heckler mouse
