= Nordic Biker War =

Gang war in Scandinavia (1994–1997)

- Part of organized crime in Denmark, Finland, Norway and Sweden
- Date: 22 January 1994 – 25 September 1997
- Location: Denmark, Finland, Norway and Sweden
- Caused by: Drug trade criminal dispute
- Result: Stalemate: Peace treaty; Each side retains designated territory; Crackdown by police services

Parties
Bandidos MC: Aphuset MC; Bronx '95 MC; Klan MC; Morbids MC; Rabies MC; Undertakers MC; Outlaws MC	Hells Angels MC: Avengers MC; Barley MC; Cannonball MC; Choppers MC; Customizers MC; Overkill MC; Rebels MC; Rednecks MC; Screwdrivers MC; Untouchables MC	Danish government: Politiet; Danish army; Finnish government: Poliisi; Norwegian government: Politi; Swedish government: Polis; Swedish army; Support: U.S. government: ATF; DEA; FBI

Lead figures
Michael Garcia Olsen; Lars Harnes; Marko Hirsma; Uffe Lindenskov Larsen†; Michael Ljunggren †; Jim Tinndahn Thore Holm Hansen	Torkjell Alasker; Thomas Möller; Christian Sass Middelboe; Jørn Nielsen; Bent Svane Nielsen	Poul Nyrup Rasmussen; Esko Aho (until 1995); Paavo Lipponen (until after 1995); Gro Harlem Brundtland (until 1996); Thorbjørn Jagland (until after 1996); Carl Bildt (until 1994); Ingvar Carlsson (until 1996); Göran Persson (until after 1996)

Number
7 chapters and 130 members	15 chapters and 290 members	

Casualties and losses
6 killed, 34 wounded	3 killed, 40 wounded	1 civilian killed, 22 police officers and civilians wounded
- Killed: 11 (9 bikers, 2 non-combatants); Wounded: 96 (74 bikers, 22 non-combatants); Imprisoned: 138+

The Nordic Biker War was a gang war that began in January 1994 and continued until September 1997 in parts of Scandinavia and Finland, involving the Hells Angels and Bandidos outlaw motorcycle clubs. The conflict is also known as the Great Nordic Biker War or Second Biker War (Danish: anden rockerkrig) to distinguish it from the earlier Copenhagen Biker War, which took place between 1983 and 1985.

The conflict arose from disputes over territory and organized crime rackets, as well as personal feuds within the biker subculture. Specifically, the members of both groups sought a monopoly on the right to engage in crime in certain geographical areas. The war resulted in the killings of nine gang members, with shootings and bombings totalling another 74 attempted murders. The bikers utilized car bombs, machine guns, hand grenades, an anti-tank rocket, and small arms during their gang war, and assassination attempts were even made inside prisons. The majority of the hostilities took place in or around Copenhagen in Denmark, Helsinki in Finland, Oslo in Norway, and Helsingborg in Sweden.

The biker war was also costly for the police, who struggled to put an end to the murders. In overtime for police officers alone, the cost was set at around 50–75 million kroner. On 15 October 1996, a bill, known as Rockerloven ("the Rocker Act") in the media, was passed in the Folketing (Danish Parliament) which allows the police to evict motorcycle gangs from their headquarters. As a result of the 1996–1997 period of the conflict alone, 138 people were sentenced to a total of 240 years in prison. Several of those convicted were given life imprisonment for murder and attempted murder. Specific wings for motorcycle gang members were created at Vridsløselille Prison and Horsens State Prison. Significant improvements were also made to the security of military weapons depots as a result of the Nordic Biker War after several burglaries.

The conflict effectively came to an end in the summer of 1997 when the two sides reached a peace agreement, with the well-known defence lawyer Thorkild Høyer as mediator. On 25 September 1997, Bent Svane Nielsen of the Hells Angels and then-Bandidos president Jim Tinndahn announced during a press conference that the rival clubs had ended their war. Nielsen stated "We cannot give guarantees that there will be no more incidents, but we can actively intervene and ensure that those who defy the cooperation agreement are excluded from our biker culture."

== Background ==
The Nordic outlaw biker culture emerged in Sweden with the establishment of numerous motorcycle clubs (MCs) in the late 1960s and early 1970s. Motorcycle groups inspired by the British rocker subculture then began in Denmark in the 1970s. Beginning around 1980, Danish clubs became increasingly influenced by developments in the United States and began to refer to themselves as "bikers", the American term for motorcycle enthusiasts. The term "rocker" is still commonly used by the police and media in Denmark to refer to the outlaw motorcycle subculture. Relative to its population, Denmark in particular had the highest number of outlaw bikers in Europe and perhaps even in the world. Commander Troels Ørting Jørgensen of the Danish police told the Canadian journalists Julian Sher and William Marsden in a 2006 interview: "No one has ever done a sociological investigation as to why in this small, extremely peaceful country of Denmark we have so many chapters of outlaw motorcycle gangs. They are very much hardliners, they are fierce, they are violent. We are the country of Hans Christian Andersen. We should not create crooks like that".

As the biker milieu expanded in Sweden and Denmark, violent conflicts arose between motorcycle clubs and the authorities began to take an interest in the clubs while gang wars proliferated. Outlaw motorcycle clubs then began to appear in Finland in the late 1980s, during which time there was little distinction between club-affiliated bikers and independent recreational motorcyclists. Motorcycle gang violence did not occur in the country until the early 1990s. Inter-gang violence escalated in the Nordic countries as motorcycle clubs became increasingly more involved in organized crime during the 1980s and 1990s, resulting in the arrival of larger international clubs. Biker gangs in the region previously consisted of locally bounded single chapters which later merged ("patched over") into the Hells Angels (HAMC) and the Bandidos as they sought protection in more powerful clubs. The Hells Angels arrived in 1980 and gradually established dominance over the Scandinavian biker scene, before smaller clubs banded together and began forming Bandidos chapters in 1993 in order to resist forced amalgamation by the HAMC.

The first Hells Angels chapter in Scandinavia was founded in Denmark on 30 December 1980 when Unionen MC from Copenhagen – a union of four local clubs, dating from 1977 – was patched over. Bullshit Motorcycle Club, a merger of two clubs opposed to the HAMC's dominance, settled in Copenhagen's Christiania and took control of the hashish trade in the area. Bullshit and the Hells Angels engaged in a conflict, that came to be known as the First Biker War or Copenhagen Biker War, between September 1983 and December 1985, resulting in the murder of eight Bullshit members (including three presidents), one Hells Angels member, and two innocent people. In addition, Bullshit MC members were also prime suspects for the murder of two non-bikers during the war. When the police visited the former clubhouse of Bullshit in 1986, they also found the corpse of a man beneath the clubhouse floor. The first war was limited to Copenhagen alone, unlike the second, and the number of deaths during the Copenhagen war met or exceeded the number of deaths in the following war. Unlike the second war, the first had a clear winner and no "peace treaty" was required. Bullshit's members were younger and less organized than those in the Hells Angels, and they disbanded in 1988.

=== Expansion ===
The Hells Angels subsequently expanded into Norway, opening a chapter in Trondheim on 1 August 1992 following a "patch over" of the Rowdies biker gang. The Rowdies spent close to ten years as a Hells Angels support club and were eventually "patched over" two weeks after carrying out a July 1992 knife and chain attack on a rival club, which led to the hospitalization of several of its members. The Malmö club Dirty Dräggels then became Sweden's first Hells Angels chapter on 27 February 1993. They were sponsored for membership by the Danish Hells Angels after vanquishing two other local clubs for the right to wear the Angels' "colors". In Finland, the Overkill gang of Helsinki were made a HAMC "hangaround" club in 1992 via an association with the Hells Angels of Denmark. Overkill became involved in a struggle with another local motorcycle gang, the Iron Hog biker club, for the Hells Angels' approval. On 9 February 1993, several Iron Hog members including the club's president was severely beaten by Overkill bikers at a restaurant in Järvenpää, and the club subsequently withdrew. The following day, Overkill member Riko Roimu told Finnish television: "We are an official Hells Angels hangaround club and I'm fucking proud of it". Police then carried out a high-profile raid, using a Patria Pasi armored personnel carrier and a Super Puma helicopter, on Overkill's headquarters in Tapulikaupunki, Helsinki on 3 March 1993, arresting five people.

The Bandidos were established on the European continent via a chapter in Marseille, France, on 20 September 1989. After violent encounters between the French Bandidos and Hells Angels, American executives from both clubs met in Paris in the late summer of 1993 and signed a non-aggression pact in order to avoid police and government countermeasures that could prevent their expansion. The Undertakers MC, a club in North Zealand formerly on good terms with the Hells Angels before disputes led to a strain in relations, applied for membership in the Bandidos from the club's leadership in the United States and France in 1992. After serving as prospective members for a period of time, the Undertakers were patched over by the Bandidos on 17 December 1993. The Hells Angels sanctioned the Bandidos' takeover of the Undertakers on the condition that they confine themselves to just two chapters, in Stenløse and Hørsholm. Christian Möller of the Danish police blamed the conflict upon the Bandidos leader Jim Tinndahn as he told Sher and Marsden: "As far as we known the Bandidos promised not to expand further, but they did". Upon their foundation, the Danish Bandidos attracted several new members, including former members of Bullshit and individuals who had either been expelled from the Hells Angels or had left the club in protest over the organizational and leadership philosophy. One Danish Hells Angels stated: "He [Tinndahn] filled his club with this dirt. Tinndahn recruited all that garbage, and such a sick mixture produces more sick things". Simultaneously, a conflict was brewing between the Hells Angels and the Mordids MC across the Øresund strait in southern Sweden. The Helsingborg-based Morbids were offered a path to Hells Angels membership on the condition that they merge with the Rebels, a rival club with whom they had previously clashed. The Morbids rejected the offer and instead aligned with the Danish Bandidos for support. The Bandidos and their leader, Jim Tinndahn, had no intention of adhering to what they considered Hells Angels-imposed protocol concerning their recruitment and development, and they made the Morbids a probationary Bandidos chapter on 22 January 1994.

Police and prosecutors described the conflict that followed as a drug trade war between the Hells Angels and the Bandidos, the two most powerful outlaw biker gangs in Scandinavia. Members of both clubs were involved in drug, prostitution, extortion and arms smuggling rings, and bikers controlled the distribution of amphetamine, cocaine, hashish and MDMA in some areas. Amphetamine was sourced from Poland and hash from Morocco. Canadian researcher Yves Lavigne stated that one of the reasons for the intensified biker activity in the Nordic region is the proximity to the Baltic states, where drugs could be exchanged for weapons from the former Soviet Union. The Bandidos' growth in the drug trade brought them into conflict with Hells Angels-sponsored dealers. However, the criminologist Joi Bay criticised this assumption, saying that the police tactics were ineffective because they were based on the incorrect premise that the motivation of the bikers was profit, while in fact they were driven by values such as honor, style, respect, and brotherhood, and any drug crimes were incidental. In retrospective interviews in 2014, involved bikers rejected the drug-trade dispute interpretation and said the war started from a purely personal confrontation when the small Morbids club, with only six members, refused to capitulate to the larger Hells Angels. Similarly, the lawyer who mediated between the gangs says that, unlike a similar conflict in Canada, the Nordic war was a matter of pride and attitudes, not business. Most of the violence of the conflict took place in the Copenhagen area. The Danish chapters of the HAMC and Bandidos were seen as the driving forces behind the biker war, and were also responsible for its resolution.

=== Membership and weaponry ===
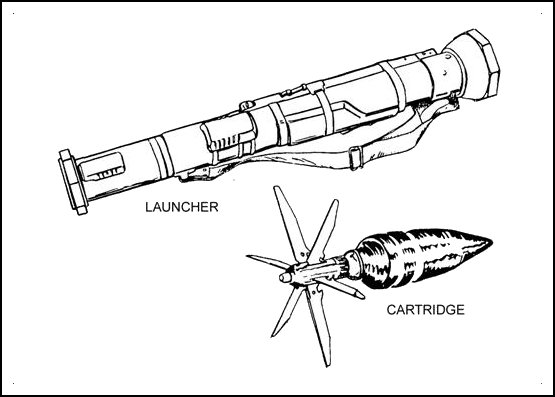
Anti-tank weapons were stolen from Swedish Army bases and used to destroy a number of clubhouses. In total 13 anti-tank rockets were fired between 1994 and 1997.

While there were just two Bandidos chapters in Denmark and a single Hells Angels chapter in Sweden when the war commenced in 1994, each country was home to approximately fifteen independent motorcycle gangs, most of which were aligned with the Hells Angels. The recruitment pool for the clubs in Scandinavia consisted of over a thousand outlaw bikers. By 1997, the Bandidos' presence in the Nordic countries consisted of approximately 130 members from at least seven chapters, while the Hells Angels' contingent was made up of around 290 members in total from fifteen chapters, with 85 in Sweden, 110 in Denmark, 70 in Norway and 25 in Finland. Denmark at the time was home to the highest concentration of motorcycle gang members in Europe and possibly the world, a phenomenon police and sociologists have been unable to explain.

Between 1994 and 1997, there were at least 36 break-ins at Swedish Army and Danish Home Guard installations; at least 16 Bofors anti-tank rockets, 10 machine guns, around 300 handguns, 67 fully automatic rifles, 205 rifles of various calibres, hundreds of hand grenades and land mines, and 17 kilograms of explosives plus detonators were stolen. Police believe the Bandidos or their support clubs were responsible for the majority of the thefts. The Danish and Swedish militaries subsequently tightened security. The Hells Angels obtained Russian- and Yugoslavian-made rocket launchers as well as surplus machine guns and rifles from former Eastern Bloc countries. The conflict saw the use of the Swedish AT4 eight times, and the Russian RPG-22 three times. Hand grenades were used four times and a booby trap once. Car bombs were utilized three times, while other types of explosives were also used on three occasions. The bombs used scaled in size between one and five kilograms. Over twenty drive-by shootings also occurred.

== The conflict ==
=== 1994–1995: The beginnings of the biker war ===
Shortly after the Morbids MC in Helsingborg became a probationary Bandidos chapter on 22 January 1994, members of the Hells Angels prospect club Rebels MC strafed the club's headquarters with gunfire. The Rebels later became a HAMC chapter in Hasslarp, based out of a rural compound less than two miles away from the Morbids' dairy farm-turned-clubhouse in Helsingborg. The clubhouse was targeted again the following week when, on 26 January 1994, Malmö Hells Angels chapter president Thomas Möller fired a high-caliber submachine gun from the roof of a van, resulting in a Morbids member losing a finger. On 13 February 1994, fifteen Danish Bandidos members were ambushed by Hells Angels associates at a Helsingborg nightclub, resulting in thirteen gunshots being fired and Joakim Boman, a member of the Hells Angels support club Rednecks MC, being shot dead. Three others, including Hells Angels hangaround Johnny Larsen and a Bandidos member, were wounded. Boman's murder has never been solved. On 21 February 1994, the Morbids retaliated by attacking the Rebels' clubhouse with a Carl Gustaf 8.4 cm recoilless rifle, damaging the premises' garage and swimming pool but resulting in no injuries. After these incidents, a number of break-ins to the armories for the militias of Sweden and Denmark began. Most men in both Sweden and Denmark undergo obligatory military service and know how to use military weapons. The first major theft of weaponry occurred on the night of 20 February 1994 when the Bandidos broke into an armory in rural Sweden to steal 16 shoulder-launched anti-tank rockets along with hundreds of hand grenades, pistols, rifles and crates of ammunition.

The Hells Angels' leadership in the United States became concerned about the Bandidos' expansion, but also wished to avoid a war and the associated legal repercussions. The HAMC mother chapter in Oakland summoned Thomas Möller to a meeting where the club's leader Sonny Barger declared that, while the Paris pact marked Sweden as Hells Angels territory, the agreement was one of non-aggression. The Oakland chapter then met with senior Bandidos members in Houston and reaffirmed their claim over the country. Bandidos leaders in the U.S. were unable to control their probate chapter in Helsingborg, however, as the club's European president Jim Tinndahn continued to support the Morbids' retaliation against the Hells Angels. A delegation of Bandidos from Texas met with the Hells Angels chapters in Malmö and Copenhagen in an effort to resolve the dispute but diplomacy proved futile. A series of shootings in Helsingborg followed in the spring of 1994. The war quickly revealed the differences in the strategies of the opposing sides. The Bandidos' attacks were seemingly indiscriminate, whereas the Hells Angels' were more strategically aware, targeting their rivals' leadership.

In the weeks before Overkill MC in Helsinki became a prospective Hells Angels chapter on 19 February 1994, club member Marko Hirsma was beaten at a Hells Angels party in Sweden where he was working as a bar tender. The reasons behind the beating are unknown. He resigned from the club and went on to found the Undertakers MC in Vantaa in August 1994. In the spring of 1994, an officer with the Helsingborg police department complained: "There were shootings almost every day". On 22 June 1994, Juha Nousiainen – president of the Barley MC, a HAMC support club in Kellokoski – fatally shot Kari Korpi, president of the Klan MC, outside a restaurant in Järvenpää. Nousiainen was convicted of manslaughter and sentenced to nine years in prison on 22 September 1994. While seemingly an isolated incident at the time, Korpi's killing has in retrospect been viewed in relation to the biker war. According to some sources, the Klan was a Bandidos affiliate. The Customizers MC and Rabies MC in Oslo became hangaround clubs of the Hells Angels and Bandidos, respectively, in June 1994.

A Morbids member was shot in his car in central Helsingborg on 11 November 1994, and a brawl ensued between Bandidos and Hells Angels supporters at a nightclub two days later. That same month, a Morbids member killed a fellow inmate at Helsingborg prison for providing information to the police. On 6 and 7 December 1994, car bombs were discovered attached to the vehicles of two Rebels members. A shooting involving two cars occurred on a road outside Kattarp on 8 January 1995 when members of the Rebels and Morbids both arrived at the same time to assist a woman whose vehicle had broken down. The Morbids were awarded Bandidos membership on 28 January 1995. On 5 February 1995, a Rebels member was assaulted by two men armed with iron pipes while visiting a restaurant in Helsingborg with his girlfriend.

The Undertakers were appointed a hangaround club by the Bandidos on 9 February 1995.

On 19 February 1995, a shooting involving members of the Customizers and Rabies took place in Oslo when Customizers fired at Rabies bikers riding in a car, leaving one man wounded. Customizers were made a Hells Angels prospect chapter and Rabies became a Bandidos probationary branch in October 1995.

The vice president of the Hells Angels support club Cannonball MC was shot and wounded by an Undertakers member at a restaurant in Helsinki on 1 April 1995.

Jim Tinndahn transferred from the Bandidos' "Northland" chapter in Stenløse, Denmark to the Helsingborg chapter in June 1995.

On 17 July 1995, Bandidos Sweden president Michael "Joe" Ljunggren was shot dead with a submachine gun, likely a Carl Gustaf m/45, while riding his motorcycle on the European route E4 south of Markaryd in Småland, Sweden while returning from a meeting with the Undertakers in Helsinki. Ljunggren's murder remains a cold case. The Choppers MC in Stockholm gained prospect status from the Hells Angels shortly after the killing, leading to a theory that the Choppers carried out the assassination of Ljunggren on orders from the HAMC. The Bandidos launched two attacks against the Hells Angels in retaliation. On 25 July 1995, two Undertakers members fired a rocket-propelled grenade stolen from a Swedish Army weapons depot at the Overkill clubhouse in northern Helsinki. The missile penetrated the building's walls but failed to explode on impact. An identical strike was carried out by the Helsingborg Bandidos against the Sweden Motorcycle Clubhouse in Helsingbor, then an affiliate of Hell's Angels, on 31 July 1995, again resulting in no injuries. Dan Lynge, a Danish police officer who infiltrated the club, carried out surveillance on the compound with a Swedish Bandidos prospect in the days before the attack.

The Undertakers were upgraded to a Bandidos prospect chapter 19 August 1995 and moved to a new clubhouse in Kamppi, Helsinki. The same month, Marko Hirsma and two other Undertakers members assaulted and stole the "colors" of the former Overkill president. On 27 September 1995, Hirsma and another Undertakers biker were attacked by members of Cannonball and Overkill outside a courthouse in Pasila, Helsinki when they arrived to attend the trial of Kai Tapio Blom and Antti Tauno Tapani, two club members charged with the RPG attack on the Overkill headquarters. Four men with baseball bats destroyed an Overkill-owned tattoo parlour in Punavuori, Helsinki as reprisal on 11 October 1995. Blom and Tapani were convicted in October 1995 and sentenced to 6 years' and 4 1/2 years' imprisonment, respectively.

A prospective Outlaws chapter was founded in Oslo by Thore "Henki" Holm Hansen on 26 October 1995 and became a full-fledged chapter by the end of the year. Due to the clubs' positive relations in the U.S., the Norwegian Outlaws pledged support to the Bandidos in the escalating biker war. Gunshots were fired at the Outlaws' clubhouse on 18 November 1995, with four bullets going through the premises' windows and another four striking its brick walls.

A Rebels member was wounded in the leg during a shootout between two vehicles on a motorway outside Helsingborg on 6 December 1995.

On 17 December 1995, two leading members of the Bronx '95 MC – a Bandidos hangaround club founded in Trondheim earlier that year – were shot and wounded while riding in a car. Three Hells Angels members were charged with attempted murder, but were acquitted in December 1996. The incident effectively stopped the founding of a Bandidos chapter in Trondheim, a city that has since been seen as a Hells Angels stronghold.

The conflict reached Danish soil when two Hells Angels members were severely beaten by a gang of between five and ten Bandidos at the "Stardust" discotheque in Strøget, Copenhagen on 26 December 1995. Another Hells Angel reportedly locked himself in a women's bathroom to escape the Bandidos.

=== 1996: The conflict escalates ===
An explosive device was thrown at the headquarters of the Hells Angels hangaround club Screwdrivers MC in Hamar, Norway on 15 January 1996, and the Customizers' clubhouse in Oslo was struck with a petrol bomb on 18 January 1996. On 26 January 1996, seven shots were fired at a car carrying several Outlaws members outside the Customizers' clubhouse in Alnabru, Oslo, leaving an Outlaws biker wounded in the arm. Thirteen people associated with the Customizers were charged in the case. A tattoo studio linked to the Hells Angels in Oslo was firebombed on 1 February 1996.

On 12 February 1996, two grenade attacks were carried out against Overkill in Helsinki; two people were badly injured when a restaurant in the Tapanila neighborhood belonging to a club member was bombed, and motorcycle garage in the Hernesaari quarter owned by the club was also targeted in a second attack. The grenade was thrown into a warehouse next door to the garage in error.

The Rebels became a full-fledged Hells Angels chapter on 27 February 1996. A hand grenade left by the car of a Hells Angels hangaround in Helsingborg two days later failed to explode.

Eight bikers were shot in four different Nordic countries in just over a week in early March 1996, resulting in two deaths. On 1 March 1996, an Undertakers member and prospect were shot after confronting Overkill bikers carrying out reconnaissance on their clubhouse. Club vice-president Jarkko Kokko died from his wounds on 17 March 1996, and the prospect survived. As a result of the killing, Overkill were made the Hells Angels' Finnish chapter on 23 March 1996 and relocated to a new headquarters in Nöykkiö, Espoo. Two Hells Angels were convicted of Kokko's murder; Ilkka Ukkonen was sentenced to 12 1/2 years' imprisonment and Jussi Penttinen was given 6 years'.

A Bandidos prospect was seriously injured when Bandidos and Hells Angels in two cars engaged in a gunfight in central Helsingborg on 5 March 1996.

On 10 March 1996, the Hells Angels carried out a twin attack on Bandidos members at Copenhagen Airport and Oslo Airport, Fornebu. Members of both clubs were attending events in Helsinki and found themselves on the same flights as they returned to their respective cities in Denmark and Norway, allowing the Hells Angels to formulate at ambush at both airports. At Copenhagen, two Bandidos members, a prospect and a hangaround were shot, resulting in the death of Uffe Lindenskov Larsen, president of the club's Dalby-based "Southside" chapter. Jan Anderson of the Swedish Bandidos told a journalist that he saw between 8-10 Hells Angels came out of a car in the parking lot to start shooting into the bus that he and the other Bandidods were in. Bandidos Norway president Lars Harnes was wounded in a shooting at Oslo. Commander Jørgensen stated of the Larsen murder: "It was a very good professional job, like a military operation. The Hells Angels are not like the Bandidos, who are kamikaze pilots. The Hells Angels always try to measure out the pros and cons, what is good, what is bad. The Bandidos have recruited the worst of the worst. The scum. But that made them extremely strong. So there was retaliation after retaliation". Sher and Marsden wrote that "the Bandidos just blasted away in apparent indiscriminate attacks" while "the Hells Angels, if anything, showed themselves to be more strategically aware. They appeared to plot their attacks with the aim of decapitating the Bandidos".

Six Danish Hells Angels members and associates were sentenced to a total of fifty-three years' imprisonment, and one was given a life sentence, for the Copenhagen attack, while Hells Angels Oslo chapter president Torkjell "Rotta" ("Rat") Alsaker was sentenced to three years' for the shooting at Fornebu airport. The airport shootings marked the beginning of the most violent phase of the Nordic Biker War.

An unexploded hand grenade was discovered outside the clubhouse of the Bandidos' chapter in Drammen, Norway on 21 March 1996.

In the early hours of 11 April 1996, the Hells Angels' compound in Hasslarp was targeted again, this time with two rockets. The clubhouse was severely damaged, but no-one was injured or killed.

The Danish Hells Angels "South" chapter clubhouse in Snoldelev was hit with an anti-tank missile shortly after midnight on 17 April 1996, destroying the upper floor of the structure but causing no injuries to the sixteen bikers inside. Four hours later, the headquarters of the HAMC support club Avengers MC in Nørresundby near Aalborg was struck by another missile, causing minor damage as the projectile embedded itself in an interior wall without exploding. Four club members inside the clubhouse were unharmed. On 26 April 1996, imprisoned Bandidos "Southside" chapter vice-president Morten "Træben" ("Wooden Leg") Christiansen was left in critical condition with shrapnel wounds and burns when assailants threw a hand grenade into his cell after breaking into Horserød State Prison by cutting a large steel padlock securing the gate of the perimeter fence. After tossing a grenade into Christiansen's cell, the Hells Angels shot up his cell with machine guns. Brian "Bremse" ("Brake") Paludan Jacobsen, a member of the Hells Angels' Copenhagen chapter, lost a leg and two associates were also wounded when two hand grenades were thrown into his home in Brønshøj from a passing vehicle on 7 May 1996. A stolen car used in the attack was discovered nearby.

Two female tourists were wounded when the car they were travelling in was fired upon while they were driving past the Customizers' Oslo clubhouse on 9 May 1996. One woman suffered minor wounds despite being shot in the head. Five people with ties to the Customizers were charged in the case.

An unexploded hand grenade was found outside Hells Angels' Espoo clubhouse on 12 May 1996. Another attack on the same location on 18 May 1996 also failed when two drunken men blew themselves up while attempting to throw hand grenades into the clubhouse. Both men were seriously wounded but survived. Undertakers president Marko Hirsma was sentenced to nine months in prison on 12 July 1996 after being convicted of orchestrating the attempted attack. The imprisonment of leading members of both the Undertakers and the Hells Angels saw the conflict decelerate in Finland. Violence continued in the prison system, however. The last public conflict of the Finnish biker war occurred on 29 June 1996 when Hells Angels and Undertakers clashed at a music festival in Järvenpää. Members of the two clubs were then involved in a prison fight the following month.

Jim Verner, a Bandidos member from Klodskov near Nykøbing Falster in Denmark, discovered an explosive weighing half-a-kilogram attached to his van on 10 July 1996. He had been driving with the bomb underneath his vehicle for several hours, but it failed to explode due to a technical error.

On 15 July 1996, four Bandidos members – two from the Drammen chapter, and two from the visiting Helsingborg chapter – were involved in a brawl with members of the Customizers in central Oslo. Later that evening, the four Bandidos were ambushed north of Mjøndalen while on a motorcycle run. Helsingborg Bandidos prospect Jan "Face" Krogh Jensen died after being struck in the head with a bullet fired from a semi-automatic 7.65 caliber pistol. Police believe that Michael Garcia "Lerche" Olsen, to whom Krogh Jensen was serving as a bodyguard, was the intended target of the shooting. Olsen had been the president of the Copenhagen Hells Angels before being expelled. He then joined the Bandidos' Helsingborg chapter, becoming the club's European sergeant-at-arms. The Customizers became the Hells Angels' Oslo chapter later that year, and a club member was acquitted of premeditated murder in Krogh Jensen's death on 11 June 1998. The investigation into the killing was closed in 2000. On 19 July 1996, a car occupied by a Customizers member and a companion was targeted in a drive-by shooting in Oslo city centre, but no one was injured. Two people associated with the Bandidos were charged in the case, and police believe the shooting was carried out in retaliation for the killing of Jan Krogh Jensen.

A six-kilogram remote-controlled bomb hidden in a sports bag was placed in front of the Hells Angels' clubhouse in Nørrebro, Copenhagen but failed to explode when the radio-controlled trigger malfunctioned, potentially saving the lives of four bikers in the building as well as residents of the street, on 21 July 1996. The device was later detonated by a police explosive ordnance disposal unit. Jacob "Hip Hop" Andersen, a member of the Bandidos "Southside" chapter, was sentenced to 3 1/2 years in prison in 1997 after police technicians found his fingerprints on the sports bag.

Bandidos Sweden president Mikael "Mike" Svensson was shot in the leg while driving near the Hells Angels' headquarters in Hasslarp on 23 July 1996. His car was struck by several bullets. Svensson was discovered by police when he made his way to Helsingborg hospital for treatment.

On 25 July 1996, a team consisting of between two and four men infiltrated Jyderup State Prison and fired over twenty rounds from an automatic weapon into the cell of Jørn "Jønke" Nielsen, a senior member of the Hells Angels' Copenhagen chapter. Nielsen was wounded, shot twice in the abdomen and once in the arm.

A member of the Hells Angels was badly injured by gunfire while driving his car in Helsingborg on 4 August 1996.

On 5 August 1996, a civilian was wounded in a drive-by shooting in Greve, south of Copenhagen. Police believe the victim was mistaken for a Hells Angels member living in the same building. An associate of the Bandidos "Southside" chapter was wounded after being shot in his car as he left the chapter's clubhouse near Haslev on 14 August 1996.

A Hells Angels member was assaulted by an unknown intruder at a prison in Helsinki in August 1996.

A Bandidos member escaped being hit with gunfire when sixteen rounds were fired at his car in Stockholm on 27 August 1996. The following day, the vice-president of the Hells Angels' Helsingborg chapter survived being shot three times in the legs after he was attacked by three men at his garage.

On 2 September 1996, a Hells Angels member was shot and wounded by two men in a drive-by shooting as he closed a store in Aalborg owned by the HAMC's defense fund. A bomb planted on the car of another Aalborg Hells Angels member exploded after falling from the vehicle in a parking lot on 4 September 1996. The explosive detonated three meters away, damaging several cars but causing no injuries.

Twelve Hells Angels were arrested and charged with conspiracy to commit murder after police raided three clubhouses in Hasslarp, Djurslöv and Malmö in southern Sweden on 10 September 1996.

A car bomb exploded outside a Hells Angels clubhouse situated in a residential neighborhood of Roskilde, Denmark on 12 September 1996, causing extensive damage but no injuries.

Members of the Bandidos and Hells Angels are believed to have exchanged gunfire on a street in Helsingborg on 15 September 1996. A parked car suffered damage from bullets, and fifteen empty shells were found on the street. On the next day, the Helsingborg police found in a stolen car driven by a Hells Angels a machine-gun equipped with a silencer; a shotgun and two grenades.

The Hells Angels' clubhouse in Roskilde was attacked again in the early hours of 22 September 1996 when over two-hundred-and-fifty machine gun rounds were fired at the building from an adjacent football pitch. One Hells Angels member was wounded. The attack was the work of two snipers armed with a hunting rifle and a submachine gun.

A rocket was fired at the headquarters of the Hells Angels chapter in Hasslarp on 24 September 1996, and a similar operation was conducted against the same clubhouse four days later. A missile launcher was tied to the second story of an adjacent abandoned factory, and a string rigged to the trigger and attached to the Bandidos' getaway car pulled the cord. The rocket cut through electrical wires over a railway track before hitting the compound. Two hand grenades and a smoke grenade were also thrown into the building. Both attacks caused material damage but no injuries. At around 3:00 am on 3 October 1996, a powerful bomb caused a large explosion outside the HAMC clubhouse in Malmö, injuring four people and caused widespread damage to buildings within several hundred yards. Four bikers inside the building were not injured, and twenty families had to be evacuated from their homes. The following day, approximately a hundred people took part in a demonstration against the Hells Angels.

The Undertakers were patched over by the Bandidos on 5 October 1996, forming the club's "Downtown" chapter in Helsinki.

The biker war reached its crescendo on 6 October 1996 when the Copenhagen Hells Angels chapter's annual "Viking Party", held at the club's Nørrebro headquarters and attended by around one-hundred-and-fifty people, was attacked with a rocket-propelled grenade. At about 3:05 am, a Bandidos prospect fired the grenade from the roof of an adjunct building, using a Carl Gustav rocket launcher. The missile exploded after penetrating the building's concrete walls, killing two people – Hells Angels prospect Louis Linde Nielsen and Janne Krohn, a single mother from the local area who accepted an invitation to the event – and wounding nineteen others, including HAMC Denmark national president Christian Sass Middelboe. A Danish policeman who had monitoring who was attending the "Viking Fest", John Verlander, stated: "People were screaming and walking around, wounded. I call for two ambulances but when I walked farther inside I told them to send everything they got". Janne Krohn was the first non-combatant killed as a result of the conflict and the resulting public outrage caused the Danish government to introduce harsher anti-crime legislation in an effort to reduce motorcycle gang violence. A bill, known as the Rockerloven ("Rocker Act") by the media, was passed on 15 October 1996 to allow the police to evict bikers from their clubhouses. Bandidos member Mickey Borgfjord Larsen was arrested on 24 October 1996 after his fingerprints were found on a machine gun thrown away by assailants in Fælledparken following the attack. He was charged with the attack on the clubhouse as well as the attempted murder of Jørn Nielsen at Jyderup prison, but was released after four months in custody due to a lack of evidence. Bandidos prospect Niels Poulsen was convicted of carrying out the attack on 13 March 1998 and sentenced to life imprisonment.

A car bomb exploded outside the Hells Angels headquarters in Oslo on 30 October 1996. The explosion was so powerful that the clubhouse was moved to the foundation. No one was injured.

In November 1996, Marko Hirsma was attacked and beaten at Helsinki Prison amidst a struggle for control of the prison drug trade fought between the Bandidos and a group of rival dealers.

A Bandido was wounded when two club members came under gunfire while trapped in a private yard in Valby, Copenhagen on 5 December 1996. On 9 December 1996, a member of the Bandidos' Aalborg chapter survived being shot ten times as he waited in his car.

=== 1997: Stalemate, ceasefire and peace agreement ===
Hells Angels member Kim Thrysøe Svendsen was shot and killed while driving in Vejgaard, Aalborg when three rounds were fired at his car on 10 January 1997. Approximately 500 Hells Angels from across Europe and the U.S. attended Svendsen's funeral. Several members of the Bandidos were charged with the killing, but due to lack of evidence, the prosecution had to give up the case, after which the suspects were released. Svendsen's murder is unsolved.

On 13 January 1997, a member of the Bandidos' Helsingborg chapter was involved in a shootout outside his home with two people who fled by car. A member of the Stockholm Hells Angels visited a hospital with a bullet wound shortly afterwards.

Outlaws president Thore Holm Hansen and his French bodyguard Jean-Luc Verbert were shot by members of the Hells Angels support club Untouchables MC who entered the Outlaws' clubhouse in Grønland, Oslo on 22 January 1997. Verbert was left hemiplegic. Five members of Untouchables were charged in the case, one of whom was sentenced in September 1998 to 3 1/2 years in prison for the attempted murder of Verbert.

On 2 February 1997, a senior Bandidos member being held at a detention center in Køge, Denmark survived an attempt on his life when an anti-tank missile fired at his cell failed to explode. Another Bandidos member survived being shot while walking to his car near a kindergarten on Amager. The Hells Angels again attempted to kill a jailed rival by firing an anti-tank missile into a police cellblock in Holbæk on 18 February 1997, destroying two cells but leaving a Bandido and another inmate unhurt.

A Hells Angels member and two prospects were arrested while waiting in a car outside an apartment in Oslo that previously belonged to Thore Holm Hansen in February 1997. The trio, armed and dressed in camouflage clothing, were arrested after police were alerted. They were later acquitted of conspiracy to commit murder. A motorcycle shop in Alnabru, Oslo, where two Bandidos members worked, was bombed on 13 March 1997. There were no casualties. Two men were charged in the case.

Yet another anti-tank missile was fired at the Helsingborg Hells Angels clubhouse on 22 March 1997. The grenade failed to explode and nobody was injured.

A Hells Angels associate was wounded by a shot from a 9mm pistol, fired at him from another car as he waited at a stop light in Frederiksberg, Copenhagen on 1 April 1997. Later that day, two men, including a Bandidos member, were arrested on suspicion of carrying out the shooting. An attempt was made on the life of a Bandidos member being held at Vestre Prison on 1 May 1997. An electric razor sent to him contained ninety-five grams of explosives and would have exploded had it been plugged in. Prison authorities suspected the device, however, and confiscated it before it could be used. A Bandidos member was shot and wounded in Køge on 7 May 1997. On 12 May 1997, three Bandidos supporters were injured by gunfire while in a car in Aalborg.

On the orders of the Hells Angels' Oslo chapter president, Torkjell Alsaker, Screwdrivers MC members detonated a thirty-to-fifty kilogram van bomb outside the entrance of the Bandidos' headquarters in Drammen on 4 June 1997, reducing the building to rubble and killing Irene Astrid Bækkevold, a fifty-one-year-old woman who was passing in her car. Twenty-two others were injured. The bomb had been placed inside a stolen mini-van. As with the shooting of Jan Krogh Jensen the previous year, it suspected that the intended target of the blast was Hells Angel-turned-Bandido Michael Garcia Olsen. The visiting Olsen and two others fled the burning clubhouse immediately after the explosion. The Screwdrivers were granted full membership to the Hells Angels as a result of the attack. After a four-and-a-half year investigation, seven men associated with the Hells Angels, including Alsaker, were convicted for their roles in the bombing.

On 7 June 1997, four Bandidos members were shot outside a restaurant in Liseleje, Denmark. Bjørn Gudmandsen was killed and three others were wounded. Hells Angels member Vagn Smidt was convicted of murder and three counts of attempted murder, and he was sentenced to life in prison on 20 November 1998. The final incident in the biker war took place on 11 June 1997 when a Bandidos clubhouse in Dalby was attacked with a hand grenade.

The conflict effectively ended during the summer of 1997 as the continual hostilities were producing no clear victor. The deaths of Janne Krohn and Irene Bækkevold, two female non-combatants, resulted in considerable public backlash against the bikers as well as intense scrutiny from politicians and law enforcement. Internal pressure also contributed to the war's conclusion. Suffering battle fatigue after years of hostilities and facing sudden, universal condemnation from the public, the bikers were eager to end the conflict. Many bikers' businesses were also negatively affected. Christian Möller of the Danish police told Sher and Marsden in a 2006 interview: "We could see it in our investigations that they had no money and they had to use it all on this war. A lot of the bikers were older and had children and were not interested in having this war go on". Möller stated that the fact the war "was very expensive" for both sides created the impetus for peace. With each side holding a strong incentive to find a solution, American and European leaders of the Bandidos and Hells Angels met again in the U.S., first in Colorado and then in Seattle in June 1997. Ultimately, the clubs' Danish chapters were pivotal in producing the biker war's resolution. The Copenhagen police also helped initiate relations by providing logistical support and security for peace conferences, although they did not participate in the negotiations. A treaty designating each club's territory, right down to individual bars, cafes and nightclubs, was signed. Hells Angels Denmark nomads chapter president Bent Svane Nielsen and Bandidos European president Jim Tinndahn held a live televised press conference on 25 September 1997 and, without revealing details of their agreement, announced an official end to hostilities. The peace agreement that Nielsen and Tinndahn signed defined precisely the areas controlled by both clubs in a manner that both sides considered acceptable. The crime level among gang members subsequently returned to pre-conflict levels.

Much of the pressure for peace was due to the desire to take advantage of the European Common Market created by the European Union. In 1992, the nations of the European Union formed a customs-free and visa-free zone of 376 million people with the purchasing power of $11 trillion US dollars, making the EU into one of the world's largest economic units. The Europol intelligence agency noted in a press statement in 1997 that: "Some of the greatest beneficiaries of a single market have been organised crime". Both the American leaders of the Bandidos and the Hells Angels wanted to use their Scandinavian clubs to expand into the rest of the EU and found the biker war to be a costly distraction. After the biker war ended, both the Bandidos and the Hells Angels moved a number of their Scandinavian members into Spain and Italy. In particular, the Hells Angels were very aggressive in having Scandinavian Hells Angels move into Spain in order to seize control of the main smuggling routes under which marijuana from Morocco is smuggled though Spain to the other nations of Europe. Likewise, investing in Spanish real estate is a major source of money laundering in Europe and both the Hells Angels and Bandidos purchased property in the Costa del Sol for the purpose of money laundering.

== List of victims ==
Name(s)	Date	Notes
Joakim Boman	13 February 1994	23-year-old Rednecks MC member Boman was shot dead at a nightclub in Helsingborg, Sweden. His murder remains unsolved.
Kari Korpi	22 June 1994	35-year-old Klan MC president Korpi who was fatally shot outside a restaurant in Järvenpää, Finland. Barley MC president Juha Nousiainen was convicted of manslaughter and sentenced to nine years in prison on 22 September 1994.
Michael Ljunggren	17 July 1995	33-year-old Ljunggren, the national president of the Swedish Bandidos, was shot dead while riding his motorcycle on the European route E4, south of Markaryd, Sweden. His murder remains unsolved.
Jarkko Kokko	17 March 1996	Kokko, the 27-year-old vice president of the Finnish Bandidos, was shot in an attack on the Bandidos' clubhouse in Helsinki, Finland on 1 March 1996; he died from his wounds on 17 March. Hells Angels members Ilkka Ukkonen and Jussi Penttinen were convicted of the murder; on 7 June 1996, Ukkonen was sentenced to 12 1/2 years' imprisonment and Penttinen to 6 years'.
Uffe Lindenskov Larsen	10 March 1996	Larsen, the 32-year-old president of the Bandidos "Southside" chapter in Dalby, Denmark, was shot and killed during the Copenhagen Airport ambush. Hells Angels members Michael Brokside and Jørgen Nielsen were convicted of Larsen's murder on 20 December 1996 and 16 October 1997, respectively, and both were sentenced to life imprisonment.
Jan Krogh Jensen	16 July 1996	37-year-old Bandidos member Jensen was shot dead in Mjøndalen, Norway. A Hells Angels member was acquitted of Krogh Jensen's murder on 11 June 1998, and the investigation into the killing was closed in 2000.
Louis Linde Nielsen and Janne Krohn	6 October 1996	Nielsen, a 38-year-old Hells Angels "prospect", and Krohn, a 29-year-old woman, were killed in a rocket attack on the Hells Angels' clubhouse in Copenhagen, Denmark. Bandidos "prospect" Niels Poulsen was convicted of the murders and sentenced to life imprisonment on 13 March 1998.
Kim Thrysøe Svendsen	10 January 1997	26-year-old Hells Angels member Svendsen was shot and killed in Aalborg, Denmark. Svendsen's murder is unsolved.
Irene Astrid Bækkevold	4 June 1997	Bækkevold, 51-year-old woman, was a passer-by killed in a bombing carried out on the Bandidos' clubhouse in Drammen, Norway. Seven Hells Angels members were convicted of perpetrating the attack on 10 June 2002.
Bjørn Gudmandsen	7 June 1997	24-year-old Bandidos member Gudmandsen was shot dead in Liseleje, Denmark. Hells Angels member Vagn Smidt was convicted of the murder and sentenced to life in prison on 20 November 1998.

== Aftermath ==
A joint task force was established as a result of the Nordic Biker War, with police in Denmark, Finland, Norway and Sweden cooperating with the United States Drug Enforcement Administration (DEA) and Bureau of Alcohol, Tobacco, Firearms and Explosives (ATF). In Denmark, a team consisting of homicide investigators from the National Police, the homicide department of the Copenhagen police and individual employees from the police circles of Aarhus, Odense and Roskilde was also formed.

Political backlash against the bikers was particularly severe in Denmark. The Danish Parliament doubled the maximum penalty for illegal possession of weapons to four years' imprisonment, and also gave the police new powers to carry out phone tapping and house searches when occupants are away. Furthermore, police were given the ability to confiscate a suspect's money or property if he is unable to prove he obtained it legitimately. A bill, popularly known as the Rockerloven ("Rocker Act"), was passed on 15 October 1996 to allow the police to evict motorcycle gangs from their headquarters. Bikers had previously taken advantage of a government policy of subsidizing clubhouses for any hobbyist or special interest group with a membership of five or more. Many of these headquarters were situated in residential areas.

138 people were sentenced to a total of 240 years in prison as a result of the 1996–1997 period of the conflict alone. Several of those convicted were given life imprisonment for murder and attempted murder. Specific wings were created for housing motorcycle gang members at Vridsløselille Prison and Horsens State Prison in Denmark. The last gang member imprisoned for crimes committed during the biker war was paroled in December 2015.

The biker war resulted in eleven killings (six Bandidos members or associates, three Hells Angels members or associates, and two non-combatants), seventy-four attempted killings, and ninety-six people injured. Of those wounded, forty were related to the Hells Angels and thirty-four to the Bandidos, while twenty-two were on-duty police officers or civilians. Given the use of military weapons by both sides, Sher and Marsden wrote that it was "miraculous" that more people were not killed in the biker war. There were 400 violent incidents between 1994 and 1997 in Scandinavia related to the biker war, and the number of dead might actually be higher as there were a number of people who disappeared during the biker war who were almost certainly murdered.

Both clubs emerged from the conflict stronger than before. The Hells Angels opened up two more chapters in Denmark and by 2005 had a total of eight Danish chapters up from the six they had in 1994. The Hells Angels had a total of about 168 "full patch" members in Denmark in 2005. In Sweden the Hells Angels had six chapters with 80 "full patch" members in 2005. In 2005, the Hells Angels had five chapters in Norway and four chapters in Finland. The Hells Angels had about 250 members in various puppet clubs in Denmark alone in 2005. In Denmark, the Bandidos had thirteen chapters with a total of 171 "full patch" members in 2005. In 2005, the Bandidos had four chapters in Sweden along with five probationary chapters in Norway and two probationary chapters in Finland. In 2005, the Bandidos had 350 members in various puppet clubs in Denmark. Both the Scandinavian Bandidos and Hells Angels have since the end of the biker war in 1997 been moving into Spain, Italy and Eastern Europe. Furthermore, the Scandinavian Bandidos have moved into Thailand, where many of the Scandinavian Bandidos live for much of the year and own property. So many Danish Bandidos live in Thailand that the Bandidos have four chapters in that country whose chapter presidents are all Danish. Commander Jorgensen told Sher and Marsden about the Bandidos in Thailand: "It's all that they want. There's power, corruption, females, nice climate, no police to hamper them". Likewise, a number of Scandinavian Hells Angels own property and live in South Africa. Sher and Marsden wrote that American-based biker gangs such as the Hells Angels and the Bandidos had "rationalized" the biker gangs of Europe over the course of a 15-year period as both clubs "have merged and amalgamated hundreds of largely white neighborhood street punks, soccer thugs and racists into disciplined organizations that now rival traditional ethnically based organized crime groups such as the Italian Mafia and the Asian Triads. They have empowered Europe's criminal underclass. They have given it structure and common purpose. They have turned the marauding punks of Europe into a finely tuned, intimidating machine without depriving them of their freewheeling independence. In so doing, they have given them stature, power, and wealth-or at least the expectation of wealth". Both the Bandidos and the Hells Angels use the members of their Scandinavian chapters as a sort of shock troops to expand into other areas, and the Nordic Biker War did not change this status.

In Denmark and Norway, the police have been more aggressive in their pursuit of outlaw bikers. In 2004, it was revealed that a total of 1,086 Danish Hells Angels and Bandidos have criminal records, meaning that one out of every two Danish outlaw bikers has a criminal record. Commander Jorgensen told Sher and Marsden: "The whole philosophy here has been that after the biker war ended we would not allow ourselves to relax and let them share in their criminal activity". The police in Norway have likewise been aggressive in their pursuit of outlaw bikers. By contrast, the police in Sweden have not owning up to a number of incidents where policeman have been threatened and injured in biker attacks. In 1999, a Swedish policeman was blinded for life by a bomb planted in his car by the bikers and in 2000 another Swedish policeman had his car blown up on his drive-way. In 2002, a Swedish policeman found a bomb planted on his front door. One Swedish policeman who did not want to be named told Sher and Marsden: "Because of all the threats against police officers, I think policemen close their eyes. They don't want to see. They're afraid".

Ongoing simultaneously to the Nordic Biker War was the Quebec Biker War in Canada, pitting the Hells Angels against the Rock Machine. Impressed with how the Scandinavian Bandidos had fared against the Angels, the outmatched Rock Machine sought an alliance with the Bandidos. In June 1997, three senior members of the Rock Machine – Johnny Plescio, Frédéric "Fred" Faucher and Robert "Tout Tout" Léger – travelled to Sweden to meet with Bandidos leaders, but were promptly deported upon arrival in the country. Rock Machine president Faucher arranged for his club to be absorbed into the Bandidos in an effort to "internationalize" the Quebec Biker War, and to prevent the Hells Angels from attacking the Rock Machine, by raising the possibility of causing a biker war in the United States. The American leadership of the Bandidos were not keen on Faucher's attempt to involve them in the Quebec war, and the Rock Machine were ultimately sponsored into the Bandidos by the Swedish and French branches of the club, rather than the American "mother chapter". The Rock Machine formally joined the Bandidos at a ceremony in Vaughan, Ontario on 1 December 2000. The Danish branch of the Bandidos also sponsored the Chatham, Ontario chapter of the Loners, which joined the Bandidos as probationary members on 22 May 2001 and became full members on 1 December 2001 in another move that was not sanctioned by the international headquarters of the Bandidos in Houston, Texas. It was agreed that even though the Danish branch of the Bandidos were responsible for the Canadian branch as their sponsors, the American branch would supervise the Canadian Bandidos.

=== Subsequent events ===
The Bandidos and Hells Angels quickly expanded into their allotted territories after the peace treaty, and the crime rates among the clubs' members returned to pre-conflict levels. Subsequent conflicts among the two groups has largely been avoided. The Finnish Bandidos and Hells Angels have operated in parallel rather than as competitors. In Norway, a cold war over territory and members has emerged, with the Bandidos allied with the Outlaws on one side, and the HAMC allied with the Coffin Cheaters on the other. Both clubs have continued to expand in the Nordic region since the end of the biker war in 1997. By 2005, the Hells Angels had formed eight chapters in Denmark, four in Finland, five in Norway and six in Sweden. The Bandidos had established thirteen branches in Denmark, two in Finland, five in Norway and four in Sweden. The Bandidos and Hells Angels remained the most prominent criminal organizations in Scandinavia until the early 2000s and, as such, were capable of preventing any competing gangs from being established. In the mid-2000s, however, street gangs began to emerge and the motorcycle gangs' hegemony over organized crime was broken. While the status of the established motorcycle gangs has been challenged by the street gangs, researchers believe that the bikers may have benefited from police focus on their new rivals. In response to the changing criminal landscape, the leaders of the Bandidos and HAMC formed their own affiliated street gangs which serve as recruitment pools and carry out street-level crimes on behalf of the clubs. These gangs include the Bandidos' X-Team, and Hells Angels' Red & White Crew and AK81.

On 21 March 2001, former Bandidos member Claus Bork Hansen was shot twenty-six times and killed in Vanløse, Copenhagen after returning from a restaurant visit with his girlfriend, porn star Dorthe Damsgaard. The police had warned him several times, as recently the day before, that he was on the Bandidos' hit list and offered him protection, which he refused. Hansen had been expelled from the Bandidos and had transformed the former Bandidos clubhouse in Hedehusene, where he was president, into a chapter of the Hells Angels support club Red & White Crew. Detectives investigated the killing and later arrested four full members of the Bandidos and charged them with the murder. During the trial, it emerged that the Bandidos and Hells Angels held a crisis meeting on the street in front of a café in Sankt Hans Torv in Nørrebro two evenings before Hansen was shot dead. In the Eastern High Court, one of the men accused of the murder – Roskilde Bandidos chapter president Karl Martin Thorup – denied that the meeting between the Bandidos and Hells Angels in Nørrebro was about Hansen and his association with the Red & White Crew. It later emerged in the High Court, however, that the Bandidos and Hells Angels feared a new biker war because Hansen was suspected of pitting the two clubs against each other in revenge for his expulsion from the Bandidos. The HAMC leadership agreed at the meeting with senior Bandidos members that the Bandidos could kill Hansen. On 12 April 2002, Jens Christian Thorup was convicted and sentenced to life in prison for the murder. The twelve jurors and three magistrates also decided that he should be admitted to a psychiatric hospital when the Judicial Council determined he was mentally ill. On 15 January 2003, the Supreme Court ruled that his sentence should be reduced to sixteen years in prison. The other three suspects – Karl Martin Thorup, Kent "Kemo" Sørensen and Peter Buch Rosenberg – were acquitted of charges of murder and conspiracy to murder on 11 April 2002.

Bandidos associate Flemming Jensen was beaten, stomped and stabbed to death after getting into a fight with a group of Hells Angels members at a tavern on Jomfru Ane Gade in Aalborg on 12 August 2001. The twenty-eight-year-old Jensen was a well-known figure in the cityscape of Langå and Randers, and prior to the summer of 2000 was close to the inner circle of the heavily crime-laden Randers gang Cerberus. The Cerberus gang and their friends in the Randers motorcycle club Pirates were traditionally associated with the Bandidos, but in the summer of 2000 the Pirates switched sides and joined the Hells Angels. However, according to sources with in-depth knowledge of the gang, Flemming Jensen remained loyal to the old friends in the Bandidos circles (formerly Bullshit in Randers), but after the Cerberus dissolution had no firm connection to groups or gangs. According to Bandidos president Jim Tinndahn, however, Jensen was not an aspirant to the biker group, but had served a sentence with Bandidos members at Nyborg State Prison. Shortly after the killing, police arrested Jørn "Jønke" Nielsen, who was charged with aggravated violence resulting in death as, according to witnesses, he had kicked and stomped on Flemming Jensen. 21-year-old Hells Angels prospect Jesper Østenkær Kristoffersen confessed that he was the one who carried the knife. On 7 February 2002 at the District Court in Aalborg, Kristoffersen was sentenced to six years in prison for violence resulting in death. Nielsen was acquitted at the District Court in Aalborg on 4 April 2002. On 18 September 2002, however, he was sentenced to four years in prison for aggravated violence. On 17 August 2001, Flemming Jensen's funeral was held at Værum Church in Randers, where over a hundred people attended. A high-ranking Bandidos member promised revenge after the killing of their friend Jensen. However, Chief Detective Inspector Aage Nørgaard from Aalborg Police told B.T.: "When the bikers say they want to avenge the killing, it is almost their slogan. They always say that. I compare it to when the Queen says 'God save Denmark'." There were no new clashes, however.

In June 2010, Bandidos president Jim Tinndahn announced that the peace treaty between his club and the Hells Angels had collapsed, partly because the HAMC had breached terms of the agreement by admitting six Bandidos members. Bandidos vice-president Michael "The Chef" Rosenvold and Hells Angels president Jørn Nielsen both confirmed the end of the truce in September 2011. The Bandidos subsequently set up branches in locations that, according to the agreement, were Hells Angels territory, including Odense and Amager. Police sources said at the time that, despite the end of the agreement, a new biker war seemed unlikely, although there were clashes as both clubs moved into the previously neutral territory of Esbjerg. The renewed tensions resulted in another outbreak of violence in September 2012. After two stabbings and an attempted hit-and-run, a seventeen-ton unmanned truck with a brick on the accelerator ploughed into a property used by the Bandidos on Amager on 18 September 2012. Police suspect the incident was carried out by the Hells Angels support group AK81. The following day, a hundred bikers – including Michael Rosenvold, who succeeded Jim Tinndahn as Bandidos Europe president – were arrested as police raided eighteen locations across Zealand in an attempt to assert control ahead of a what they believed to be an imminent gang war. Guns, knives, axes, drugs and anabolic steroids were also seized in the raids.

== See also ==
- Quebec Biker War (a simultanious biker war involving The Hells Angels and Bandidos)
- List of outlaw motorcycle club conflicts
- Bandidos MC criminal allegations and incidents
- Hells Angels MC criminal allegations and incidents
- Outlaws MC criminal allegations and incidents

== Sources ==
=== Books ===
- Langton, Jerry (2010), Showdown: How the Outlaws, Hells Angels and Cops Fought for Control of the Streets, John Wiley & Sons, ISBN 978-0470678787
- Lavigne, Yves (1999). Hells Angels at War. Toronto: HarperCollins. ISBN 9780002000246.
- Sher, Julian; Marsden, William (2006). Angels of Death: Inside the Bikers' Empire of Crime. Toronto: Alfred Knopf Canada. ISBN 9780307370327.
- Veno, Arthur (2007), The Mammoth Book of Bikers, Avalon Publishing Group, ISBN 9780786720460
