= Mickey Borgfjord Larsen =

Danish outlaw biker and gangster (1971–2003)

Mickey Larsen
- Larsen's October 1996 mugshot
- Born: Mickey Borgfjord Larsen; 7 March 1971; Copenhagen, Denmark
- Died: 17 September 2003 (aged 32); Glostrup, Denmark
- Cause of death: Murder (car bomb)
- Occupations: Outlaw biker, gangster
- Years active: 1988–2003
- Allegiance: Bandidos MC (1996–2001)
- Convictions: Murder, attempted murder, theft, and robbery (1989); Conspiracy to commit robbery (1993); Threats, violence against an official, and firearms violations (1997)
- Penalty: Eight years' imprisonment (1989); Seven months imprisonment (1993); One years and ten months' imprisonment (1997); Eight years' imprisonment (2000)

Mickey Borgfjord Larsen (7 March 1971 – 17 September 2003) was a Danish outlaw biker, gangster and member of the Bandidos Motorcycle Club. Larsen was sentenced to eight years in prison in 1989 for the murder of tradesman Erik Dam, who was stabbed to death on an S-train at Rødovre station. Following his release from prison, Larsen joined the Bandidos during the Nordic Biker War in 1996. He rebelled against the club's leadership after the murder of Claus Bork Hansen, an expelled Bandido and close friend of Larsen who was shot and killed by Bandidos members in Vanløse in March 2001. Larsen was subsequently killed by a car bomb in the parking lot of the chapel at Glostrup County Hospital in September 2003. In 2005, two senior Bandidos members were sentenced to life imprisonment for the bombing, which in 2006 was reduced to sixteen years in prison.

== Criminal career ==
On 8 November 1988, a seventeen-year-old Mickey Larsen stabbed twenty-three-year-old tradesman Erik Dam to death on an S-train at Rødovre station. Larsen and a friend had been bothering and spitting on other passengers when Dam asked them to stop, to which Larsen responded by stabbing him eight times. Earlier that evening, Larsen had assaulted a thirty-six-year-old Polish man in Christiania, whom he stabbed four times and robbed of kr100. He was convicted of murder, attempted murder, theft and robbery. A psychiatric evaluation during the trial found that Larsen was deviant, short-sighted, self-centered, and lacked human emotion and adaptability. His upbringing was the "classic criminal background" of domestic violence and abuse. He was forcibly removed from home as an eight-year-old, and subsequently had substance abuse problems, lived on the streets for a year and a half, and attended Vitskøl Abbey and Nyborg Maritime School. On 13 April 1989, he was sentenced to eight years in prison, which was at the time the maximum penalty for people under eighteen years old.

As a parolee, Larsen was arrested again in 1993 for conspiring to rob a petrol station after he was found in a stolen car with a sharp weapon. He was sentenced to seven months in prison.

=== Bandidos ===
In October 1996, Larsen was charged with two attacks carried out during the Nordic Biker War, in which the Bandidos conflicted with the Hells Angels; the attempted murder of Hells Angels member Jørn "Jønke" Nielsen, who was targeted with a machine gun in his cell at Jyderup State Prison on 25 July 1996, and a rocket attack on the Hells Angels' clubhouse in Ydre Nørrebro, Copenhagen on 6 October 1996, which killed two people and injured nineteen. He was remanded in custody on 24 October 1996 after his fingerprints were found on a submachine gun that was discarded by the assailants in Fælledparken following the rocket attack. However, after four months in custody, he was released and both charges were dropped due to a lack of evidence. Another Bandidos member, Niels Poulsen, was convicted of carrying out the rocket attack and was sentenced to life in prison at the High Court of Eastern Denmark on 13 March 1998.

While in custody at Vestre Prison, Larsen assaulted three police officers on 16 April 1997. He was sentenced to one year and ten months in prison for threats, violence against an official and firearm violations.

On 1 July 1999, he shot from his BMW at another motorist on the Køge Bay Motorway, who had his nine-year-old daughter in the car. In a road rage incident, Larsen drew a revolver and fired through the motorist's left front door. None of the occupants of the car were hit. He was remanded in custody, but fled the city court in Roskilde on 16 July 1999 while sitting in a private room with his defender Peter Hjørne. However, he was arrested ten days later while attempting to flee to Brazil. Meanwhile, police also found evidence against him for the kidnapping and aggravated assault of a business associate who owed him money. Mickey Larsen also organized the theft of a container of six million cigarettes from the Freeport of Copenhagen by threatening the life of a crane operator and coercing him to steal the container. All the crimes were merged into one case, which on 25 August 2000 cost him a prison sentence of eight years.

== Murder ==
Larsen's friend Claus Bork Hansen, with whom he joined the Bandidos around 1996, was expelled from the club during an internal feud and was gunned down by a Bandidos hit squad in Vanløse, Copenhagen on 21 March 2001. Larsen and Hansen had made a pact in which they both vowed to take revenge in the event of one another's murder. Larsen rebelled against the club and threatened the lives of Bandidos national sergeant-at-arms Kent "Kemo" Sørensen and president Jim Tinndahn from his prison cell. He was subsequently expelled in "bad standing".

On 17 September 2003, Larsen drove to the Rigshospitalet Glostrup for a physiotherapy session in his Toyota Corolla. At the time, he was on probation. Following his treatment, Larsen entered his car which was parked near the hospital's chapel. Seconds later, at 9:11 am, one-and-a-half kilograms of TNT planted underneath the car was detonated via mobile phone. Larsen's body was torn in half by the explosion, and his lower body was blown to pieces. Several of the car's parts were thrown two-hundred meters away while the radiator hood landed on the roof of the hospital's pediatric ward. No other people were injured by the explosion.

In March 2004, 29-year-old Bandidos member Jacob "Hip Hop" Andersen was arrested in an apartment on Amager, while another member, 31-year-old Lennart Elkjær Christensen, was arrested at Vridsløselille Prison, where he was serving a ten-month sentence. Both were charged with the bombing and remanded in custody. At a trial at the Eastern High Court on 13 June 2005, both were found guilty of killing Mickey Larsen and were each sentenced to life in prison. However, on 6 January 2006, the Supreme Court decided to reduce the sentences to sixteen years' imprisonment, on the grounds that "the bombing was directed only at one person and did not cause harm to others".

=== Aftermath ===
On 18 March 2010, TV 2 aired the seventh and final episode of the crime documentary series De 7 drab (The 7 Kills), which chronicled the killing of Mickey Larsen, and which received a viewership of 815,000.

Lennart Elkjær Christensen – one of the men convicted of Larsen's murder – published the book Expect No Mercy: en rockers erindringer (The Memoirs of a Rocker), which was released on 28 February 2013. Christiansen's book recounts the murder of his former best friend Larsen, the investigation and trial, and his time spent in prison after his sentencing. Journalist Søren Baastrup co-authored the book.
