= Claus Bork Hansen =

Danish outlaw biker and gangster (1963–2001)

- Born: Claus Barrit Bork Hansen; 31 December 1963; Copenhagen, Denmark
- Died: 21 March 2001 (aged 37); Copenhagen, Denmark
- Cause of death: Murder (gunshot wounds)
- Other name: "Karate Claus"
- Occupations: Outlaw biker, gangster
- Known for: Sergeant-at-arms of the Bandidos in Europe
- Allegiance: Bandidos MC

Claus Barrit Bork Hansen (31 December 1963 – 21 March 2001), nicknamed "Karate Claus", was a Danish outlaw biker and gangster who served as the European sergeant-at-arms of the Bandidos Motorcycle Club, as well as the president of the club's Hedehusene-based Mideast chapter. He was later expelled from the Bandidos and was murdered by members of his former club following an internal feud.

== Bandidos ==
Hansen was raised in the western Copenhagen suburb of Hedehusene. Following a meteoric rise in the ranks of the Bandidos, he remained a senior member of the club for five to six years, serving as the European sergeant-at-arms in Marseille, France, before returning to Denmark, where he was allegedly a candidate for the Bandidos' national presidency. During the Nordic Biker War in Denmark, from 1995 until 1997, Hansen was personally appointed as the bodyguard of European president Jim Tinndahn, with whom he travelled to France and Australia. Hansen opposed the peace treaty with the Hells Angels which ended the biker war in September 1997, following which he became president of the Bandidos "Mideast" chapter in Hedehusene. He began to fall out of favour with the Bandidos leadership, however, partly due to his refusal to keep a low profile. Hansen reportedly had issues with Tinndahn's "militant" leadership style, and sought more room for individualism within the club. He was a well known figure in Hedehusene and was perceived as a physically large man who sported a black beard and wore a long, black fur coat, but who had a kind and outgoing personality. Hansen was known for his eccentric behaviour and would often walk in the street with his pet monkey on his shoulder. He was nicknamed "Karate Claus" due to his prowess in martial arts. Hansen dated porn star Dorthe Damsgaard, who described him as a well respected and humble man who did not advocate violence and opposed the drug trade.

An internal feud in the Bandidos began in the summer of 2000 following the expulsion of Hansen's close friend, Mickey Borgfjord Larsen, in August 2000. Hansen was warned by Bandidos president Jim Tinndahn that he should resign before being expelled from the club in "bad standing". He responded to Tinndahn by saying that he would not hand in his "colors", and that if the Bandidos wished to recover their property, they may attempt to do so. After disbanding the chapter by expelling its membership and burning all Bandidos symbols in the clubhouse, Hansen was ousted from the Bandidos and told by club leadership that he must leave the property by 1 March 2001. Hansen left the Bandidos along with three other central members of the club. The remaining members and supporters of the chapter transferred to Bandidos chapters in Roskilde, Dalby and other cities where the Bandidos operate. After failing to start a chapter of the Outlaws, Hansen instead transformed the former Bandidos clubhouse on Reerslevvej in Hedehusene into a branch of the Red & White Crew, a Hells Angels support club, in December 2000. Shortly after Hansen resigned from the Bandidos, a close friend of his in the club was promoted to a senior biker position, which escalated the conflict. Hansen accused his former friend of having been a jailhouse informant during a prison stint several years prior, and obtained internal papers from the Prison and Probation Service confirming the man's informant status, which he distributed throughout the biker community.

Hansen lived in Ølstykke for a number of years, but in February 2001, he sold his home and moved into his Thai girlfriend's basement apartment in the Copenhagen suburb of Vanløse. The money Hansen made from the sale of his home was reportedly used to pay off debts in the biker community.

== Assassination and aftermath ==
On 21 March 2001, Hansen was ambushed and shot 26 times outside his home on A.F. Beyersvej in Vanløse as he returned from a visit to a restaurant with Dorthe Damsgaard. Investigators determined that there were five gunmen involved, with 19 of the shots being fired from a single pistol and the remaining seven being fired from an additional two pistols and two shotguns. One of the shots was a coup de grâce fired into Hansen's head at point-blank range. The killers fled the scene in a stolen black Audi, which was later found burnt out. The weapons used in the shooting — a Chinese 9mm Norinco pistol, a 9mm Star Model BM pistol, a Czech-made 9mm Taurus pistol, and two Brazilian-made pump-action shotguns; a Winchester, and a Remington — were later recovered; some of the guns had been partially dismantled in an attempt to destroy evidence. Hansen was under investigation for protection racketeering at the time of his death. The police had warned him several times, as late as the day before, that he was on the Bandidos' hit list and offered him protection, which he refused. Hansen was cremated at Bispebjerg Cemetery on 7 April 2001.

Damsgaard also received rape and death threats after Hansen's murder, which she reported to the homicide division of the Copenhagen police who were investigating the shooting. One letter sent to her was signed: "God forgives – Bandidos don't".

Kriminalpolitiet investigated the killing and later arrested four "full-patch" members of the Bandidos, who were charged with Hansen's murder. During the trial, it emerged that the Bandidos and the Hells Angels had held a crisis meeting on the street in front of a café in Sankt Hans Torv in Nørrebro two evenings before Hansen was shot dead. One of the men accused of the murder – Roskilde Bandidos chapter president Karl Martin Thorup – denied that the meeting between the Bandidos and Hells Angels in Nørrebro was about Hansen and his association with the Red & White Crew. It later emerged during the trial, however, that the Bandidos and the Hells Angels feared a new biker war because Hansen was suspected of pitting the two clubs against each other in revenge for his expulsion from the Bandidos. The HAMC leadership agreed at the meeting with senior Bandidos members that the Bandidos could kill Hansen. On 12 April 2002, Jens Christian Thorup was sentenced to life in prison for the killing at the Eastern High Court. The twelve jurors and three magistrates also decided that he should be admitted to a psychiatric hospital when the Judicial Council determined he was mentally ill. On 15 January 2003, the Supreme Court ruled that his sentence should be reduced to sixteen years in prison. The other three suspects – Kent "Kemo" Sørensen, Karl Martin Thorup and Peter Buch Rosenberg – were acquitted of charges of murder and conspiracy to murder on 11 April 2002.

Hansen had made a pact with Mickey Borgfjord Larsen in which they both vowed to take revenge in the event of one another's murder. After Hansen's assassination, Larsen threatened the lives of several high-ranking Bandidos and was himself subsequently killed in a car bombing at Rigshospitalet Glostrup on 17 September 2003.

== See also ==
- Bandidos MC criminal allegations and incidents in Denmark
