= 1996 Copenhagen rocket attack =

Gang-related attack in Copenhagen, Denmark

Copenhagen rocket attack
- Part of the Nordic Biker War
- Location: Titangade 2-4, Copenhagen, Denmark
- Date: 6 October 1996; 3:05 am
- Target: Hells Angels clubhouse
- Attack type: Shoulder-fired missile attack
- Weapon: Carl Gustaf M3 or AT4
- Deaths: 2
- Injuries: 19
- Victims: Louis Linde Nielsen; Janne Krohn
- Perpetrator: Niels Poulsen

On 6 October 1996, a shoulder-fired missile was fired at the headquarters of the Hells Angels Motorcycle Club in Copenhagen, Denmark, killing two people and injuring nineteen others. The weapon was identified as either a Carl Gustaf 8.4 cm recoilless rifle or an AT4. A prospective member of the rival Bandidos Motorcycle Club was convicted of perpetrating the attack, which occurred during the Nordic Biker War (1994–97).

== Background ==
The Hells Angels clubhouse on Titangade prior to the attack.

A conflict between the Bandidos and Hells Angels, known as the Nordic Biker War, commenced in January 1994. After its beginning in southern Sweden, violence involving the rival clubs also took place in Norway and Finland, before eventually reaching Denmark on 26 December 1995, when two Hells Angels members were severely beaten by a group of Bandidos at a restaurant in Copenhagen. The Hells Angels retaliated by ambushing and shooting Bandidos members at Copenhagen Airport on 10 March 1996, killing Bandidos "Southside" chapter president Uffe Lindenskov Larsen and sparking the most violent phase of the biker war. On 17 April 1996, the clubhouse of the Hells Angels' "South" chapter in Snoldelev was hit with an anti-tank missile. Fourteen bikers inside were able to avoid serious injury. Four hours later, a second missile hit the clubhouse of the Hells Angels-affiliated Avengers Motorcycle Club in Aalborg. Four gang members sleeping in the building were unhurt by the missile, which did not detonate. A series of tit-for-tat shootings, grenade attacks and car bombings were carried out in the following months.

The fortified compound used as a clubhouse by the Copenhagen Hells Angels chapter, located at Titangade 2–4 in the Ydre Nørrebro area of the city, was first targeted on 21 July 1996, when a six kilogram remote-controlled bomb hidden in a sports bag was placed in front of the clubhouse. The bomb failed to explode when the radio-controlled trigger malfunctioned, potentially saving the lives of four Hells Angels members in the building as well as residents of the street. The device was later detonated by police. The fingerprints of Jacob "Hip Hop" Andersen, a member of the Bandidos chapter in Dalby, were found on the sports bag by police technicians. He was sentenced to 3 1/2 years in prison in 1997. Under pressure from local residents, mayor of Copenhagen Jens Kramer Mikkelsen ordered the Hells Angels to leave their headquarters, which they rented from the city under a law providing low-cost leases to clubs and civic organisations, in September 1996. The Hells Angels refused, however.

== Attack ==
At the height of the biker war, the Copenhagen Hells Angels made the contentious decision to host their annual "Viking Party" at their clubhouse on Titangade in Nørrebro on 5 October 1996. The party was attended by approximately one-hundred-and-fifty people, including Hells Angels from Denmark and Sweden, as well as local residents who were invited by the club via posters in an apparent attempt to mollify members of the public who were outraged by the spiraling motorcycle gang violence. In expectance of another attack, police officers patrolled the perimeter, and parking near the clubhouse walls was prohibited.

At approximately 3:05 am on 6 October 1996, a shoulder-fired rocket was fired at the clubhouse from the sloping roof of a building between seventy and 330 yards behind the compound. The missile exploded after penetrating the building's concrete walls, killing two people – thirty-nine-year old prospective Hells Angels member Louis Linde Nielsen and Janne Krohn, a twenty-nine-year-old single mother from the local area with no links to the club – and wounding nineteen others, including Hells Angels Denmark national president Christian Middelboe. All of the wounded were Danish, except for one Norwegian. Around half of the party's attendees were congregated around a bar at the time of the explosion. The injuries were caused by shrapnel or by the extreme heat generated by the explosion. The Carl Gustaf M3 84 mm recoilless multi-purpose rifle used in the attack was one of twelve stolen from a Swedish Army weapons depot in Malmö during a burglary on 19 February 1994. A second, unfired, rocket was also found on the rooftop. Other sources have reported that the weapon used was an AT4.

== Aftermath ==
The "rocket attack" on the Hells Angels' clubhouse party is considered the zenith of the Nordic Biker War. Janne Krohn became the first person from outside the gang environment to be killed as a result of the conflict and political condemnation followed the attack, with Prime Minister of Denmark Poul Nyrup Rasmussen describing the event as "abominable". Justice Minister Bjørn Westh, along with senior police officials, visited the scene of the attack. Reacting to the concern caused by the escalation in motorcycle gang violence, the Danish government introduced harsher anti-crime legislation, which resulted in increased powers for the police and longer prison sentences for many offences. A bill, known as the Rockerloven ("Rocker Act") by the media, was passed on 15 October 1996 to allow the police to evict biker gangs from their clubhouses.

== Litigation ==
Suspicion fell on the Bandidos immediately after the attack, and police searched the residences of several Bandidos members in Copenhagen. Bandidos member Mickey Borgfjord Larsen was taken into custody on 24 October 1996 after his fingerprints were found on a submachine gun that was thrown away by the assailants in Fælledparken following the rocket attack. He was charged with the attack on the Hells Angels clubhouse as well as the attempted murder of senior Hells Angels member Jørn "Jønke" Nielsen, who was shot in his cell at Jyderup prison on 25 July 1996. Larsen was released after four months in custody due to a lack of evidence.

Investigators believed from the beginning that the perpetrator likely had a military background and experience with anti-tank weaponry. A Bandidos member informed police that the likely culprit could be Niels Poulsen, a club prospect with anti-tank training in the military. Poulsen had travelled to France but was arrested upon his return to Denmark on 19 November 1996. Poulsen's DNA matched that of the blood residue found on a balaclava that was discovered in a basement stairwell near the crime scene, and it was also proved that a scar under Poulsen's eye was sustained while firing the weapon. He was convicted of carrying out the attack and was sentenced to life imprisonment at the Eastern High Court on 13 March 1998. Poulsen was released from prison on probation in December 2015. At the time, he was the last gang member imprisoned for crimes committed during the biker war.

== See also ==
- 1997 Drammen bombing
