= Michael Ljunggren =

Swedish outlaw biker and gangster (1962–1995)

- Born: Per Michael Ljunggren; 22 March 1962; Helsingborg, Scania, Sweden
- Died: 17 July 1995 (aged 33); Markaryd, Småland, Sweden
- Cause of death: Murder (gunshot wounds)
- Other name: "Joe"
- Known for: National president of the Bandidos in Sweden
- Children: 2 sons (born 1985 and 1989)
- Parent: Inger Ljunggren (mother)
- Allegiance: Rebels MC (1981–1984); White Trash MC (1984–1986); Rebels MC (1986–1989); Morbids MC (1991–1994); Bandidos MC (1994–1995)

Per Michael "Joe" Ljunggren (22 March 1962 – 17 July 1995) was a Swedish outlaw biker and gangster who served as the first national president of the Bandidos Motorcycle Club in Sweden. Ljunggren was a central figure in the Nordic Biker War, in which the Bandidos feuded with the Hells Angels. He was shot dead while riding his motorcycle on the E4 motorway in Småland. The murder remains unsolved, but police believe members of the Hells Angels to be responsible.

== Outlaw biker ==
Ljunggren was a member of the Rebels Motorcycle Club, which was formed in Helsingborg in 1981. The Rebels were affiliated with the Hells Angels chapter across the Øresund strait in Helsingør and, through this association, Ljunggren became acquainted with Hells Angels member Jan "Face" Krogh Jensen. In 1984, Ljunggren founded the White Trash MC with Jensen and another Danish biker who had moved to Helsingborg, with the intention of eventually forming a Hells Angels chapter in Sweden. The White Trash became closely associated with the Black Sheep MC, a Hells Angels prospect club in Roskilde which later became the Hells Angels' South chapter. Two Black Sheep members, including Jan "Clark" Jensen, took refuge with the White Trash in Helsingborg following the Copenhagen Biker War. The White Trash also had good relations with Hells Angels in Helsingør and its then president Michael Garcia "Lerche" Olsen. The Helsingør Hells Angels chapter closed in the spring of 1986 following an internal dispute, however. The same year, police raided the White Trash's clubhouse while searching for Jan "Clark" Jensen and discovered weapons and stolen goods, which resulted in Ljunggren being sentenced to prison. The police operation and Ljunggren's imprisonment caused the White Trash to disband, and Ljunggren applied to return to the Rebels. He withdrew from the biker club scene following the birth of his second son in 1989 and, in 1991, spent time riding through the United States with his friend Lasse "Kalle Fist" Karlsson, another former Rebels member.

Upon his return to Sweden, Ljunggren joined the Morbids MC, which had been formed in Helsingborg earlier that year. In 1993, a fight took place between the Morbids and the Rebels in Stockholm, which left several Morbids members beaten. Some time later, the Hells Angels in Malmö offered a path to membership for the Rebels and Morbids on the condition was that the clubs were merged and that Michael Ljunggren and his friend Lasse Karlsson were not members. The Morbids – a club with only six members – rejected the invitation and, requiring support in its feud with the Hells Angels, instead began an affiliation with the Undertakers MC in Zealand, who had contacts with the first Bandidos chapter in Europe, located in Marseille. The Undertakers were patched over by the Bandidos in December 1993, and the Morbids followed suit in January 1995 after first serving as a probationary chapter for a year. Ljunggren became the Bandidos Sweden national president. Upon its foundation, the Bandidos chapter in Helsingborg was attacked by the Hells Angels, beginning the Nordic Biker War.

== Murder ==
On 17 July 1995, Ljunggren was returning from a visit to the Finnish branch of the Undertakers in Helsinki – which would become a Bandidos probationary chapter the following month before being patched over in October 1996 – with Jan "Clark" Jensen, who joined the Bandidos earlier that year after leaving the Hells Angels. The pair boarded a ferry to Stockholm then rode their Harley-Davidson motorcycles in the direction of Helsingborg. Jensen's motorcycle broke down in Ljungby, however, and Ljunggren continued the journey alone. He was shot while riding his motorcycle on the E4 motorway, south of Markaryd, Småland. He then fell from his bike and was run over by a car. An ambulance took him to a nearby hospital, with doctors initially thinking a simple road accident had occurred. Only at the hospital did it become clear that he had been shot several times with a firearm, likely a Carl Gustaf m/45. He was wearing a flak vest, but one of the shots penetrated the armour, striking him in the back and killing him. There are various theories as to how Ljunggren was shot. One presumption is that he was shot by a sniper; this theory is supported by the testimony of two witnesses, a Danish couple. Another is that he was shot from a car driving behind him, which is supported by the police technical examination of the bullets' trajectory. The murder has gone unsolved and has become a cold case, although police believe the Hells Angels were involved. Information obtained by police from a mobile phone network indicates that Hells Angels members' phones were used and moved along Ljunggren's route from when he stepped ashore in Stockholm. Suspects include a Hells Angels prospect club from Helsinki (Undertakers members fired a rocket-propelled grenade at the prospects' Helsinki clubhouse eight days after Ljunggren's murder in a presumed revenge attack), Choppers MC from Stockholm (which gained prospect status from the Hells Angels shortly after the murder) or another Hells Angels prospect club from Helsingborg (who were, according to rumours, alerted to Ljunggren's location by a corrupt police officer).

== See also ==
- List of unsolved murders (1980–1999)
