= Thomas Möller =

Swedish Hells Angels leader

Thomas Möller (born 7 June 1964) is a former president of the Hells Angels in Sweden.

Möller was one of the founders of the car-and-bike club Dirty Dräggels in Malmö. This club became a hangaround chapter of Hells Angels Denmark in 1990, prospects in 1991 and Sweden's first regular Hells Angels club in 1993. Bent Svane "Blondie" Nielsen, the president of the Angels Copenhagen chapter, decided to expand into Sweden in the late 1980s, and three biker gangs in Malmö fought with each other to be the first Hells Angels chapter in Sweden. Nielsen awarded the Dräggels "hang-around" status with the Hells Angels in 1990 and "full patch" membership in 1993 after they eliminated the other two gangs. Möller became the club's vice president and Hells Angels' spokesman in Sweden, and later president. Like many other outlaw bikers, Möller is an ardent admirer of Nazi Germany.

In January 1994, he was accused by the Swedish police of stepping atop of a van and of using a submachine gun to shoot up the clubhouse of the Morbids biker gang in Helsinborg after he learned that the Morbids were planning to "patch over" to join the Bandidios. Only one Morbid was injured who had one of his fingers severed by a bullet while the rest took cover. The attack on the Helsinborg clubhouse is often considered to be the beginning of the Great Nordic Biker War. After the attack, Möller went to Oakland to meet the Hells Angels international president Sonny Barger. In the 1990s, Möller was the leader of all the Hells Angels in Europe with authority over all the European Hells Angels chapters. He reported personally to Barger. Möller owned a large estate in South Africa just outside of Cape Town where he escaped the Swedish winters. Möller divides his time between living in South Africa for half the year and the other half year in Sweden.

In 1997, the government of Denmark contemplated banning all outlaw biker clubs in response to the Great Nordic Biker War. To forestall the ban, peace talks to end the biker war began in Seattle in the summer of 1997. Barger and Möller represented the Hells Angels while the Bandidos were represented by their international vice president George Wegers, Charles "Jaws" Johnson of their Houston chapter and Jim Tinndahn of the Helsingborg chapter. The peace talks ended with the American leaders imposing a truce on their Scandinavian chapters.

Möller's only known source of income was the 14, 000 kroners per month (the equivalent of $1, 707 US dollars) he collected in disability payments. Möller claims to have a back injury that prevents him from working, leading one Swedish policeman to say: "How did he hurt his back? He has a good doctor". The Canadian journalists Julian Sher and William Marsden noted that Möller's lifestyle seemed to exceed what a man living on disability could afford as in 2006 he owned an estate in South Africa; a Ferrari automobile; a Hummer truck; two Harley-Davidson motorcycles; a number of apartments in Malmö and a private museum for his collection of Nazi memorabilia. Möller's museum included a number of genuine Nazi uniforms, banners, flags, weapons from the Second World War and even some of the automobiles owned by the Nazi leaders. Sher and Marsden wrote that Möller's lavish South African estate which was located at a picturesque location above the cliffs at the sea would vastly exceed what a man living on a disability pension could afford.

Sher and Marsden wrote that the Scandinavian outlaw bikers had a fondness for living in the tropics as a number of Scandinavian Bandido leaders owned property and lived part of the year in Thailand while a number of Scandinavian Hells Angel leaders likewise owned property and lived part of the year in South Africa. The most other most notable Scandinavian Hells Angel leader active in South Africa is Nielsen who owns an estate near the Elephant River game reserve. In 2003, the president title was handed over to his successor.

Möller's extravagant lifestyle in South Africa, where he lived in a seaside property in Llandudno close to Cape Town became the source of scrutiny from Swedish and South African authorities. In December 2007, the Swedish tax authorities demanded a payment of SEK 4.1 million from Möller due to undeclared income, which according to him was untaxable gambling profits. In March 2009, Möller's sickness benefit pay, which he had claimed for 10 years due to an alleged back injury, was withdrawn by the Swedish Social Insurance Agency, with demands for repayment to possibly follow.

In 2019, the Times of London revealed that Möller had incorporated a company in the United Kingdom in 2014 at a time when he was under investigation in Sweden for tax evasion. The Swedish police had raided Möller's Malmö house where they seized a number of bottles of brandy along with his collection of paintings to cover his unpaid taxes, but Möller claimed to have no assets to pay his back taxes at the time he set up the company in London. The journalists Christian Erikson and George Greenwood wrote that they believed that Möller was engaged in tax evasion by moving his assets out of Sweden into the United Kingdom.

== Sources ==
- Lavigne, Yves (1999). Hells Angels at War. Toronto: HarperCollins. ISBN 9780002000246.
- Sher, Julian; Marsden, William (2006). Angels of Death: Inside the Bikers' Empire of Crime. Toronto: Alfred Knopf Canada. ISBN 9780307370327.
