= 1996 Copenhagen Airport shooting =

Gang-related shooting in Copenhagen, Denmark

Copenhagen Airport shooting
- Part of the Nordic Biker War
- Police at the scene of the shooting. The body of Uffe Larsen lies beneath a white sheet.
- Location: Copenhagen Airport, Kastrup, Denmark
- Date: 10 March 1996; 4:25 pm
- Target: Bandidos members
- Attack type: Shooting, ambush
- Deaths: 1
- Injuries: 3
- Victim: Uffe Lindenskov Larsen
- Perpetrator: Hells Angels members

On 10 March 1996, six members of the Hells Angels Motorcycle Club ambushed four rival Bandidos Motorcycle Club members outside Copenhagen Airport, killing one man and wounding three others with gunfire. A twin attack was also carried out at Oslo Airport, Fornebu in Norway within an hour of the Denmark shooting, leaving one man injured. The incident occurred during the Nordic Biker War (1994–97).

== Background ==
The Bandidos and Hells Angels motorcycle gangs became involved in a territorial dispute in early 1994 in southern Sweden, and the conflict subsequently spread to other parts of Scandinavia and Finland. A contributory cause to the tension between the gangs in Denmark was an incident which occurred on 26 December 1995 when between seven and ten Bandidos members assaulted and severely beat two Hells Angels members at a restaurant in Copenhagen.

== Shooting ==
In the days before the shooting, Danish members of both the Bandidos and Hells Angels had been visiting Helsinki, Finland on separate business trips; the Bandidos were opening a new clubhouse, while the Hells Angels were attending a tattoo convention. By coincidence, the two groups of rival bikers were booked on the same flight returning to Copenhagen. The two groups encountered one another at Helsinki Airport and, according to police surveillance tapes, the four Hells Angels telephoned their clubhouse in Copenhagen and requested that a support team meet them upon their arrival in Denmark. Four Hells Angels members and two prospects in three cars would meet them at Copenhagen Airport. The Bandidos are also believed to have called for backup as they were met by two cars.

The bikers arrived at Copenhagen Airport following a tense but uneventful flight. After the Bandidos entered two waiting cars outside the departures lounge and prepared to leave the parking area, three cars full of Hells Angels surrounded them. In the knowledge that the Bandidos would be unarmed having travelled through airport security, two Hells Angels gunmen left their vehicles and fired at least thirty-three shots from automatic weapons into a car, in which four Bandidos members were travelling, before fleeing. Uffe Lindenskov Larsen, president of the Bandidos' "Southside" chapter, was killed after being shot seven times in the head, chest and legs. The other three men – a Bandidos member, a prospect and a hangaround – were seriously wounded. The surviving Bandidos fled to the arrivals lounge where they collapsed from blood loss. The other Bandidos car escaped by driving the wrong way down a one-way street, narrowly avoiding a bus.

Within an hour of the ambush at Copenhagen, a twin attack was carried out at Oslo Airport, Fornebu in Norway, during which Bandidos member Lars Harnes was shot in the chest and wounded with a handgun in the airport's arrivals lobby by Torkjell "Rotta" ("Rat") Alsaker, president of the Hells Angels' Oslo chapter.

== Aftermath ==
The killing of Uffe Larsen is considered the beginning of the bloodiest phase of the Nordic Biker War, which reached its zenith with a retaliatory rocket attack carried out by the Bandidos that killed a Hells Angels prospect and a female bystander in Copenhagen six months later. Due to the rarity of gang violence in Danish society in the 1990s, the shooting made worldwide news and resulted in a crackdown by authorities. Although motorcycle gangs had been active in Denmark since the late 1970s, inter-gang violence was rare and the bikers (called "rockers" in Denmark) were considered social misfits rather than organized criminals. Biker gangs had taken advantage of a government policy of subsidizing clubhouses of any hobbyist or special interest group with a membership of five or more. Motorcycle gang headquarters, many of which were situated in residential areas, received subsidies from this program and, following the Copenhagen Airport incident, these clubhouses became targets for attacks. The Danish government responded to the escalation in violence with anti-crime legislation, which resulted in increased powers for the police and longer prison sentences for many offences. A bill, known as the Rockerloven ("Rocker Act") by the media, was passed on 15 October 1996 to allow the police to evict biker gangs from their clubhouses.

== Litigation ==
Copenhagen police arrested and charged three Hells Angels members with murder on 12 March 1996 – two days after the shooting. Prospective club members were also later charged. The subsequent trial began at the Østre Landsret (High Court of Eastern Denmark) on 11 November 1996 and ended on 20 December. Two Hells Angels – Michael Brokside and Jørgen "Fehår" Nielsen – were convicted of murder, although Nielsen was freed after the judge refused to ratify the jury's guilty verdict. Brokside was sentenced to sixteen years in prison. Kim Jensen and Ove Witthøft were convicted on three counts of attempted murder; Jensen was sentenced to eight years' imprisonment and Witthøft to six years'. Svend Erik Holst and Johnny Engelhof Nielsen were both acquitted of murder and attempted murder, but Holst was found guilty of weapons offences.

In early 1997, a mobile cellphone was smuggled into Vestre Prison for Michael Brokside. Police were able to intercept Brokside's telephone conversations with the acquitted Hells Angels members and recorded approximately twenty hours of audio evidence. These conversations revealed that, shortly after the trial concluded, Brokside and some of the acquitted were awarded with the "Filthy Few" patch, which is given to Hells Angels members who have killed on behalf of the club. With new evidence obtained, state attorney Karsten Hjorth decided on 3 April 1997 to raise a new case against those found not guilty of partaking in the airport shooting. On 16 October 1997, Jørgen Nielsen was sentenced to sixteen years' imprisonment for the murder of Uffe Larsen, while Svend Erik Holst and Johnny Engelhof Nielsen were each sentenced to ten years' for complicity in the killing as they had both served as drivers in two cars during the attack. However, at the Supreme Court on 8 September 1998, the sentence against Jørgen Nielsen was increased to life imprisonment. At the same time, Holst and Johnny Engelhof Nielsen's sentences were also increased to twelve years in prison. On 27 June 2013, Jørgen Nielsen was released from Enner Mark Prison after serving seventeen years of his sentence.

Hells Angels Oslo chapter president Torkjell "Rotta" Alsaker was found guilty of attempted murder in the shooting of Lars Harnes at Fornebu airport and was sentenced to three years in prison in November 1998.

== See also ==
- 1997 Drammen bombing
