= Corruption in Norway =

Corruption in Norway ranks amongst the lowest in the world.

On Transparency International's 2025 Corruption Perceptions Index, Norway scored 81 on a scale from 0 ("highly corrupt") to 100 ("very clean"). When ranked by score, Norway ranked 4th among the 182 countries in the Index, where the country ranked first is perceived to have the most honest public sector. For comparison with regional scores, the best score among Western European and European Union countries (Note: Austria, Belgium, Bulgaria, Croatia, Cyprus, Czechia, Denmark, Estonia, Finland, France, Germany, Greece, Hungary, Iceland, Ireland, Italy, Latvia, Lithuania, Luxembourg, Malta, Netherlands, Norway, Poland, Portugal, Romania, Slovakia, Slovenia, Spain, Sweden, Switzerland, and the United Kingdom.) was 89, the average score was 64 and the worst score was 40. For comparison with worldwide scores, the best score was 89 (ranked 1), the average score was 42, and the worst score was 9 (ranked 181, in a two-way tie).

In 2017 Norway was ranked the most corrupt country in Scandinavia after Yara International, Telenor, Statoil, Norsk Hydro and Kongsberg, all large Norwegian companies in which the state government owns substantial stakes, faced corruption charges.

According to a report by the Norwegian School of Economics, "corruption in Norway is typically present at the municipal administration, municipal planning and building departments, and procurement departments". The report also stated that "research shows that in some municipalities, ties between public and private parties can sometimes be too close. Some municipalities are very active in their anticorruption work, and they have good notification channels and active control committees. In other places, there is a significant number of leaders in the municipal sector who have experienced attempts of corruption – and those trying to report the matter meet resistance."

== See also ==
- Crime in Norway
