= 1997 Drammen bombing =

Gang-related bombing in Drammen, Norway

Drammen bombing
- Part of the Nordic Biker War
- An aerial view of the aftermath of the bombing.
- Location: Konnerudgata 27, Drammen, Norway
- Date: 4 June 1997; 11:44 pm
- Target: Bandidos clubhouse
- Attack type: Van bomb
- Deaths: 1
- Injuries: 22
- Victim: Irene Astrid Bækkevold
- Perpetrators: Members of the Screwdrivers Motorcycle Club, on the orders of Hells Angels Norway president Torkjell Alsaker

On 4 June 1997, a bomb exploded outside the headquarters of the Bandidos Motorcycle Club chapter in Drammen, Norway, killing a passerby and injuring twenty-two others. Seven men associated with the rival Hells Angels Motorcycle Club were convicted of carrying out the attack.

== Background ==
The attack happened during the final months of the Nordic Biker War, a turf war fought between the Bandidos and Hells Angels for control of criminal rackets in Scandinavia and Finland, in which nine people had been killed prior to the bombing. The Bandidos had moved their headquarters from Oslo to Drammen the previous year. The bombing was ordered by Torkjell Alsaker, president of the Hells Angels in Norway, and was carried out by members of the Screwdrivers Motorcycle Club, an affiliated gang who were granted full membership to the Hells Angels as a result of the attack.

== Bombing ==
Between thirty and fifty kilograms of explosives, made from a mixture of diesel and synthetic fertilizer, and a homemade fuse were placed inside a Volkswagen Transporter 1981 model by John Gerhard Berg, a member of the Screwdrivers Motorcycle Club. Berg later told police during a police interview that he was given the assignment by the Hells Angels president Torkjell Alsaker. The day before the attack, Berg drove the van from Hamar to Drammen along a road where there were no surveillance cameras. On the night on 4 June 1997, Berg dressed in a black wig and other clothes he could dispose of, and drove the van into the entranceway of the Bandidos' Drammen clubhouse located at Konnerudgata 27 before lighting the bomb's fuse. He then used a bicycle that was attached to the van to flee the scene. Kai Mosether served as a getaway driver for Berg and drove him from the city. The explosives detonated at 11:44pm.

The explosion was more powerful than planned, possibly because too little gravel was used over the explosive. Shock waves could be felt 500–600 meters away from the explosion site, severely damaging nearby buildings, including the Drammens Is factory. After the initial explosion, the clubhouse re-ignited twice before the entire building collapsed in a major fire. Three people inside the building survived. Irene Astrid Bækkevold, a fifty-one-year-old woman from Skjetten who was driving past the scene in her car, was killed in the bombing and a total of twenty-two people were transported to hospital. Bækkevold's husband, who was a passenger in her vehicle, was among the wounded. At Drammen Hospital, a full emergency alert was announced and disaster preparedness was established, the first time such measures had been necessary at the hospital.

As with the shooting of Jan Krogh Jensen north of Mjøndalen in July 1996, police suspect that the intended target of the blast was Hells Angel-turned-Bandido Michael Garcia "Lerche" Olsen. Olsen had been the president of the Copenhagen Hells Angels before being expelled and joining the Bandidos' Helsingborg chapter. The visiting Olsen and two others fled the burning clubhouse immediately after the explosion.

=== Aftermath ===
Prime Minister of Norway Thorbjørn Jagland and Justice Minister Gerd-Liv Valla attended the scene of the bombing the following day. Jagland vowed to propose legislation banning motorcycle gangs from establishing clubhouses in populated areas.

Irene Bækkevold became the tenth person and the second innocent bystander to be killed as a result of the biker war. The resulting backlash from the public and increasing scrutiny on motorcycle gangs from law enforcement were among the factors that led to the end of the war, which officially ceased when the Bandidos and Hells Angels reached a truce in September 1997.

== Litigation ==
=== District Court ===
The investigation into the bombing took four-and-a-half years to complete and seven people affiliated with the Hells Angels were indicted for the attack. At Drammen District Court on 10 June 2002, John Gerhard Berg was sentenced to ten years in prison for arson and serious damage, while Torkjell Alsaker was acquitted. Two others, including Kai Mosether, were also found guilty of both arson, the other also for serious damage, and were sentenced to five and eight years in prison respectively. Mosether received the greatest penalty rebate after confessing and assisting with investigation and clarification. Three others were acquitted of arson, but sentenced to three years in prison each for serious damage. Although Alsaker was acquitted, the court found it likely that he had ordered the bombing. He was thus held jointly liable for the financial compensation as the other convicted persons. The six convicted were ordered to pay kr120,000 in compensation to the widower of Irene Bækkevold. The prosecutor had requested sentences ranging between seven and twelve years in prison, sixteen years for Alsaker, and the entire amount of damages was kr290 million.

All seven were jointly fined kr13.6 million in damages. This was equivalent to around five per cent of the actual economic damage to the environment. Insurance companies and the police had already seized assets, property, boats and cars for kr5.5 million, mostly in the name of Alsaker's cohabitant.

Five of the six convicted appealed the case to the court of appeal. Mosether accepted the verdict. The prosecution, in turn, appealed the acquittal of Alsaker, as well as the other three being acquitted of arson. The state attorney also appealed the damages question.

=== Court of Appeal ===
On 20 March 2003, the Borgarting Court of Appeal acquitted all five men of the arson conviction. Alsaker was found guilty of complicity in the crime and sentenced to sixteen years in prison. The three who were sentenced to three years' imprisonment in the District Court received six years' in the Court of Appeal. The last one sentenced to eight years' for both homicide and serious damage had his sentence increased to twelve years'.

All five appealed to the Supreme Court's Appeals Committee for case processing errors after one of the jurors had to resign as she had previously testified in the custody case against one of the convicted. The appeal was unanimously rejected by the Supreme Court.

The insurance company went to trial to reverse the compensation decision from the district court, where they were sentenced to pay kr13.5 million. Borgarting Court of Appeal removed the damages relief in a judgment on 26 October 2004. There, the seven convicted were sentenced to pay the entire compensation of kr290 million, including interest, totaling approximately kr450 million. The court thought it was unlikely that the men could ever meet the claim and also considered the consequences it had for them, but believed it was not grounds for relief.

== See also ==
- 1996 Copenhagen Airport shooting
- 1996 Copenhagen rocket attack
