= Bullshit Motorcycle Club =

Defunct outlaw motorcycle club

Bullshit MC
- Founded: 1979
- Founding location: Tårnby, Amager, Denmark
- Years active: 1979–1988
- Territory: Copenhagen
- Ethnicity: Scandinavians (Danes)
- Activities: Drug trafficking, intimidation, assault and murder
- Rivals: Hells Angels MC; Morticians MC; Black Sheep MC; Galloping Goose MC (Denmark)

Bullshit Motorcycle Club, most commonly shortened to Bullshit MC, was a Danish outlaw motorcycle gang and organized criminal group active during the 1980s. They were best known for engaging in a violent turf war against the rivaling Hells Angels Motorcycle Club. Bullshit MC formed during the late 1970s in Tårnby, Amager as the result of a merger between the Filthy Few and Nøragersmindebanden, two outlaw motorcycle clubs who had decided to band together in an effort to oppose the takeover of the ambitious Hells Angels, who had then recently expanded into Scandinavia.

== History ==
Beginning with New Zealand in 1961, the American-founded Hells Angels Motorcycle Club (HAMC) began setting up charters internationally in countries like England, Germany and Canada. Such nations had an outlaw motorcyclist movement of their own and despite them being an influential and highly respected force within the subculture, a portion of biker gang members and "one-percenter" clubs alike opposed the integration and assertiveness of the foreign-rooted HAMC. One of many of such groups was Bullshit Motorcycle Club, a homegrown Danish biker gang that emerged in 1979.

At the time of the creation of Bullshit MC, the Hells Angels had still been relatively new to the Northern European nation of Denmark as the latter had only opened up their first Scandinavian chapter (in Denmark) in 1980. Nevertheless, the aspiring Hells Angels had the intention of monopolizing Scandinavia's drug trade and planned to be the region's dominant motorcycle club. Members of Bullshit MC were also younger and less organized than their Hells Angels rivals with many of them coming from dysfunctional households. Contrastingly, bikers belonging to the Hells Angels Motorcycle Club followed the mentality set by the group's overseas chapters as the organization (in its entirety) was becoming more structured and set up more like a Mafia syndicate.

Relatively soon after their formation, Bullshit MC became major players in Copenhagen's illicit narcotics trade, and quickly rose to control much of the city's lucrative drug market. By the time that 1984 rolled around, Bullshit MC set up shop in Freetown Christiania and had managed to conquer the area's hashish trade. Members reportedly participated in a number of threats and assaults towards residents which, in combination with their gangsterist company, caused much resentment towards the club's presence within the autonomous district.

== Copenhagen Biker War ==
Copenhagen Biker War
- Part of Organized crime in Denmark
- Date: 1983–1986
- Caused by: Drug trade criminal disputes; Conflict over drug turf
- Result: Law enforcement crackdown and multiple arrests; Dissolution of Bullshit MC; Hells Angels consolidate power and become the dominant biker gang in Denmark and Scandinavia

Parties
Hells Angels MC: Morticians MC; Black Sheep MC	Bullshit MC	Danish government: Rigspolitiet; Politiet

Lead figures
Jørn Nielsen Bent Svane Nielsen	Henning Norbert Knudsen †; Palle Blåbjerg †; Anker Walther Marcus †; Michael Linde	Poul Schlüter; Erik Ninn-Hansen; Egon Weidekamp

Casualties
- Deaths: 12

The nearly three-year conflict between the two groups commenced on 24 September 1983, after three members of Bullshit MC, accompanied by a female associate, confronted some Hell's Angels at their local hangout. The Hell's Angels were led by Bent Svane Nielsen, the president of the Copenhagen chapter. A fight quickly broke out and two of the three Bullshit members, Søren Grabow Grander and Flemming Hald Jensen, were killed by the wounds they sustained from a knife and broken bottle.

On 25 May 1984, high-ranking Hells Angels biker and Danish chapter co-founder Jørn "Jønke" Nielsen walked up to the car of Bullshit MC president Henning Norbert Knudsen and fired 17 bullets at him with a Sten submachinegun. The victim's wife, Pia Soldthved Larsen, was also present in the vehicle but survived the attack. The couple had apparently been on their way to sell hashish in Christiania. Knudsen's murder received national media attention.

Bullshit member Palle "Lillebror" Blåbjerg subsequently replaced Knudsen as club president after his death in 1984. On 26 April 1985, Blåbjerg would end up being shot dead by a member of the Morticians MC - a Hells Angels affiliated support club.

Consequent to the killing of Blåbjerg, Bullshit member Anker Walther Markus was appointed as the group's third president. However, he was fatally shot by three men in jogging suits on 21 December 1985, while at a tavern managed by the club in Freetown Christiania. Additionally, an unaffiliated civilian bystander was also killed in the crossfire of Markus's assassination. Two Hell's Angels prospects and fully-patched Hell's Angels member Dan Lynge were convicted of the murders.

In 1986, Bullshit member Jan Sonberg was executed in front of the gang's Kirkegårdsvej clubhouse by then-HAMC prospect Nick Jacobsen. The slaying apparently took place as part of a gang initiation for him to become a fully-patched Hells Angels member. Jacobsen later received a life sentence for the crime.

The skirmish between the two warring gangs came to an end in 1986 after Michael Linde, the newly-elected fourth (and final) president of Bullshit MC, contacted the Hell's Angels clubhouse and voluntarily declared that the war was over after 12 people were killed in this biker gang war.

== Dissolution and legacy ==
Following the deaths of three of its presidents along with several other members, the gang war concluded with the Hells Angels emerging as the dominant outlaw biker club in Scandinavia.

Bullshit Motorcycle Club shut down their stronghold in Christiania following the outcome of the conflict and officially folded as a whole in 1988.

== Books ==
- Sher, Julian; Marsden, William (2006). Angels of Death: Inside the Bikers' Empire of Crime. Toronto: Alfred Knopf Canada. ISBN 9780307370327.
