= Bent Svane Nielsen =

Danish biker

Bent Svane Nielsen (born 22 July 1958), better known as "Blondie" is a Danish rocker (outlaw biker) who was one of the founders of Hells Angels chapter in Denmark in 1980. He was convicted of two counts of first degree murder in 1984 and has been living on parole since 1994.

== "Rocker" ==
Ever since his teenage years, Nielsen had been involved in "rocker" clubs as outlaw biker clubs are known in Europe. In 1975, he joined the Dirty Angels biker gang. In 1978, Nielsen merged five "rocker" clubs into a new one called the Galloping Goose under his leadership. Nielsen had been in close contact with the Dutch gangster Willem van Boxtel, better known as "Big Willem", the president of the Hells Angels Amsterdam chapter and the unofficial leader of all the European Hells Angels. Nielsen was described as a very ambitious criminal who had always wanted to join the Hells Angels. In 1979, Boxtel granted "hang-around" status to the Galloping Goose gang. In 1980, Boxtel granted "full patch" status to the Galloping Goose. Along with Jørn "Jønke" Nielsen (no relation-Nielsen is a very common Danish surname) he became the leader of the Copenhagen chapter of the Hells Angels, the first in Scandinavia.

== Gang war ==
Nielsen's chapter were soon engaged in a gang war for the control of the drug trade in Denmark against the rival Bullshit Motorcycle Club based in the Christiania district of Copenhagen. In 1971, a group of squatters and social activists had taken over an abandoned military base in Christiana which they called Freetown Christiania, which became an area of Copenhagen where Danish law did not apply as the Danish Crown proved unwilling to evict the activists. Freetown Christiana became the largest drug market in Europe as while one of Copenhagen's most popular tourist attractions where hundreds of thousands of people from all over Europe and North America went to buy drugs. The Bullshit gang in turn had seized control of Freetown Christiania in the late 1970s, which threatened the ambitions of the Hells Angels to take over the drug trade in northern Europe.

On 24 September 1983, Nielsen received a phone call from the barman who told him that four members of the Bullshit were drinking at the Restaurant Søpromenaden. Nielsen along with three Hells Angels entered the Restaurant Søpromenaden the same night and attacked the men with knives. Nielsen killed Steen Grabow Grander and Flemming Hald Jensen of the Bullshit MC while Michael Peter Enoch was seriously wounded. On 25 May 1984, Jørn "Jønke" Nielsen killed Henning Norbert Knudsen, better known as "Makrel", the national president of the rival Bullshit MC in front of his wife.

On 21 September 1984, Bent Svane Nielsen was convicted of two counts of first degree murder and was sentenced to 16 years in prison. By 1988, 13 people had been killed in the gang war and the Bullshit Motorcycle Club had disbanded. Commander Troels Ørting Jørgensen, the chief of the Serious Organized Crime Agency of the Danish police told the Canadian journalists Julian Sher and William Marsden in a 2006 interview: "They eliminated the Bullshit totally. They killed everybody. After that the HA [Hells Angels] were alone in the Danish criminal scene and in the Nordic as well". Sher and Marsden wrote that Nielsen was one of the most "ferocious" Hells Angels in Europe.

== Chapter president ==
Nielsen remained in charge of the Danish Hells Angels from his prison cell. In the late 1980s, he expanded into Sweden by starting a Darwinian biker war in Malmö. There were three biker gangs in Malmö, and Nielsen promised that whatever gang eliminated the other two first would be the first Hells Angels chapter in Sweden. The Dirty Draggles under the leadership of Thomas Möller won the competition by eliminating the other two biker gangs, being granted "hang-around" status in 1990 followed by "full patch" status in 1993. The Bandidos under the leadership of Jim Tinndahn also expanded into Sweden at the same time, which led to the Great Nordic Biker War.

== The Great Nordic Biker War ==
In 1994, Nielsen was released on parole. Nielsen was described as being remaining the leader of the Hells Angels during the struggle. However, Nielsen's criminal record led to him being banned from entering the United States, which does not allow foreigners with criminal records to enter its borders. By contrast, Möller, who had no criminal record at the time, was allowed to visit the United States where he met with the Hells Angels international president Sonny Barger. For this reason, Nielsen was to certain extent replaced as the leader of the European Hells Angels by Möller. On 25 September 1997, Nielsen and Tinndahn surrounded by television cameras formally signed a peace treaty which ended the biker war. The signing of the peace treaty was aired live on the TV-Avisen news show in Denmark. Nielsen at present spends much of his time in South Africa, where he owns an estate at Elephant River.

== Attempted murder ==
On 29 October 2009 around 10:00 a.m as he leaving his house with his 17-year-old son, Nielsen was ambushed and took three bullets in his leg. Police Commissioner Jesper Simonsen from Copenhagen's Gang Unit told the Ekstra Bladet newspaper : "There is no doubt that this is not an impulsive thing but a planned action. They have been waiting for him, but where and from where the shots were fired, we have no overview of yet. About 3 shots were fired from a handgun. And we are currently looking for two men of ethnic origin who were seen fleeing on a moped towards Nordre Fasanvej and through some kind of passage". After the attempted murder, Nielsen spent much time in Russia.

== Books ==
- Lavigne, Yves (1999). Hells Angels at War. Toronto: HarperCollins. ISBN 9780002000246.
- Sher, Julian; Marsden, William (2006). Angels of Death: Inside the Bikers' Empire of Crime. Toronto: Alfred Knopf Canada. ISBN 9780307370327.
