= Jan Krogh Jensen =

Danish outlaw biker and gangster (1958–1996)

- Born: 23 August 1958; Norway
- Died: 16 July 1996 (aged 37); Oslo, Norway
- Cause of death: Murder (gunshot wounds)
- Other names: "Face"
- Occupation(s): Outlaw biker, gangster
- Allegiance: Hells Angels MC; White Trash MC; Morbids MC (1991–1994); Bandidos MC (1994–1996)

Jan Krogh Jensen (23 August 1958 – 16 July 1996), nicknamed "Face", was a Norwegian-born Danish outlaw biker and gangster who was a member of the Hells Angels and Bandidos motorcycle clubs.

== Outlaw biker ==
Born in Norway and raised in Denmark, Jensen became a member of the Helsingør chapter of the Hells Angels, led by Michael Garcia "Lerche" Olsen, during the 1980s. Olsen had previously been president of the Copenhagen chapter, but left that post in 1985 as a result of an internal dispute within the club. Initially, an attempt was made to resolve the disagreements by allowing Olsen to head the newly-formed Helsingør chapter. The arrangement did not last, however, and the following year, the chapter was disbanded and Olsen was expelled from the club. After the dissolution of the Hells Angels in Helsingør, Jensen became associated with the biker community across the Øresund strait in Sweden. Initially, he was a member of the White Trash MC in Scania, where he had the role of leader and organizer in collaboration with Michael Ljunggren. At the time, the White Trash's ambitions were moving toward admission into the Hells Angels. The club disbanded following a police operation which resulted in Ljunggren's imprisonment, and both Jensen and Ljunggren later joined the newly-founded Morbids MC in 1991. The Morbids were offered a path to Hells Angels membership on the condition that they merge with the Rebels MC, a rival biker group with whom they had previously clashed. Rejecting the offer, they instead aligned with the Bandidos, whose only chapters in Scandinavia at the time were in Zealand. Jensen formally moved to Sweden in 1993, residing at an address in Vallåkra near Helsingborg. The Morbids became a probationary Bandidos chapter in January 1994 before formally patching over on 28 January 1995. The Morbids' refusal to capitulate to the larger Hells Angels was part of a chain of events that led to the beginning of the Nordic Biker War. Michael Garcia Olsen became president of the Bandidos' Helsingborg chapter, which was based out of a dairy farm-turned-clubhouse in nearby Kattarp, following the murder of Michael Ljunggren in July 1995.

== Murder ==
Jensen and Michael Garcia "Lerche" Olsen were on a visit to Norway when, at approximately 4:00 pm on 15 July 1996, they, along with two members of the Drammen Bandidos chapter, were involved in a brawl with members of the Hells Angels prospect club Customizers MC on Karl Johans gate in central Oslo. The fight began after a Customizers member overturned the Bandidos' parked motorcycles. Police quickly arrived on the scene and halted the violence before it could escalate. The Bandidos bikers were ordered away from the scene, while the police took personal details of the other party. At around 8:00 pm that evening, the four Bandidos were ambushed north of Mjøndalen while on a motorcycle run. Jensen was struck in the head with a bullet fired from a semi-automatic 7.65 caliber pistol, which penetrated his temple and became lodged five centimeters behind his right eye. He fell from his motorcycle and an ambulance was called at 8:22 pm. Jensen was unconscious but still alive when he was taken from the scene in ambulance to Ullevål University Hospital in Oslo, where he was pronounced dead two hours later. He was 37-years-old.

Police believe that the prior incident in Oslo was the cause of the shooting. It is suspected that Olsen, to whom Jensen was serving as a bodyguard, was the intended target. On 19 July, a car occupied by a Customizers member and a companion was targeted in a drive-by shooting in Oslo city centre. No injuries were reported. Two people associated with the Bandidos were charged in the case, and police believe the attack was carried out in retaliation for the killing of Jensen. The Customizers were granted full membership to the Hells Angels later that year, becoming the club's Oslo chapter.

A Hells Angels member from Drammen was charged with Jensen's murder in December 1997. Telecommunications data revealed that the suspect's mobile phone was in the vicinity of Jensen's whereabouts on the evening of 15 July 1996, moving from Oslo to Sollihøgda and Hønefoss. At 8:24 pm, two minutes after an ambulance was called to attend to Jensen, an incoming call was registered. The mobile phone struck the base station at Krokstadelva, which covered the scene of the murder. Upon a search of the suspect's car, an Audi 80, police discovered a spent cartridge underneath the driver's seat. Kripos concluded that four shell casings found at the scene of the murder originated from shots fired with the same pistol. The Hells Angel denied having used the car on the day of the shooting, and claimed it was parked for sale at a car company. However, the police discovered that the car had stopped by a petrol station near the Customizers' clubhouse in Strømsveien, Oslo on the day in question. Although the court found that it had been proven that the accused was in the area, and that the discovery of the empty cartridge in the car could link him to the killing, he benefitted from reasonable doubt and was acquitted of premeditated murder, and of complicity in Jensen's death, on 11 June 1998. The investigation into the murder was closed in 2000.

== See also ==
- List of unsolved murders
