= Crime in Norway =

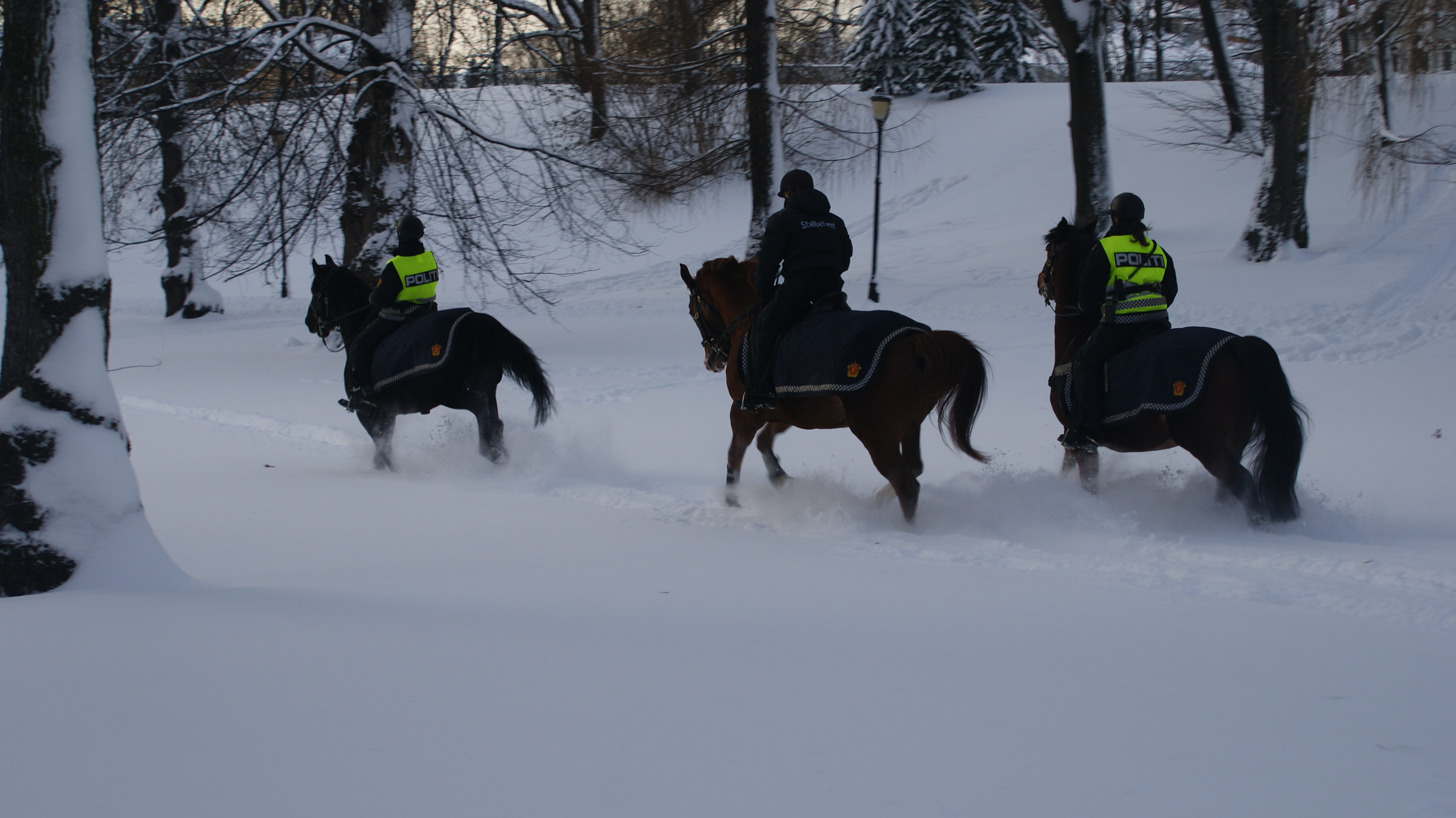
Mounted Norwegian police in Palace Park, Oslo.

Crime in Norway is countered by Norway's law enforcement agencies.

Norway has one of the lowest crime rates in the world and has seen a significant decline in crime in recent years. There was a 4.3 percent decrease from 2015 to 2016, and a decline of as much as 9.6 percent from 2014. If population growth is factored in, the level of reported offences is by far the lowest in the 24 years of these statistics.

== Crime by type ==
=== Human trafficking ===
In 2009, Norway was a destination and to a lesser extent, a transit and origin country for women and girls subjected to human trafficking, specifically forced prostitution, and men and women subjected to forced labor in the domestic service and construction sectors. Some foreign migrants may have been subjected to forced labor in the health care sector. Victims identified in 2009 originated in 45 countries – mostly Nigeria or other African countries and Eastern Europe – with victims often being from minority groups in their countries of origin. Criminal organizations have often been involved, with trafficking schemes varying by victims' countries of origin. Children in Norwegian refugee centers and migrants denied asylum have been vulnerable to human trafficking in Norway.

The government has increased the number of victims identified and forged partnerships with NGOs in Norway and in countries where trafficking victims have originated. Norway has convicted and punished a police officer under Norway's anti-trafficking law, sending a strong message of intolerance for trafficking-related official complicity.

In 2017, the U.S. State Department's Office to Monitor and Combat Trafficking in Persons placed the country in "Tier 1", and by 2023 it had moved to Tier 2. In 2023, the Organised Crime Index gave Norway a score of 5 out of 10 for human trafficking, noting that most victims are women from Eastern Europe. The country ratified the 2000 UN TIP Protocol in September 2003.

==== Prosecution ====
The government has made some progress in prosecuting sex trafficking offenders and demonstrated a strong response to official complicity in human trafficking. Norway prohibits all forms of trafficking in persons through Criminal Code Section 224, which prescribes a maximum penalty of five years' imprisonment – a penalty sufficiently stringent and commensurate with punishments for other serious offenses, such as rape.

==== Protection ====
The government has given trafficking victims in Norway shelter in domestic violence centers, as well as medical care, vocational training, stipends, Norwegian classes, and legal assistance. The government has encouraged victims to participate in trafficking investigations and prosecutions; all victims who assisted in the conviction of their traffickers received $20,000 or more in restitution from the government for their trafficking experiences. As of 2010, victims were permitted to stay in Norway without conditions during a six-month reflection period, a time for victims to receive immediate care and assistance while they consider whether to assist law enforcement. Trafficking victims reportedly were not penalized during the reporting period for unlawful acts committed as a direct result of being trafficked. The government funded the IOM to provide voluntary and safe repatriation to foreign trafficking victims.

==== Prevention ====
The government has made some progress in preventing human trafficking. The government has acknowledged trafficking as a serious problem. In an effort to reduce the demand for commercial sex acts, Norway has charged people with the purchase or attempted purchase of sex services. Norway has coordinated the government's anti-trafficking efforts through an anti-trafficking inter-ministerial commission chaired by a senior advisor at the Ministry of Justice. The inter-ministerial commission has systematically monitored Norway's anti-trafficking efforts through annual statistical reports, which are available to the public.

=== Murder ===
In 2023, Norway had a murder rate of 0.72 per 100,000 population. There were a total of 40 murders in Norway in 2023.

According to a comparison of crime statistics from Norwegian Kripos and Swedish BRÅ done by Norwegian daily newspaper Aftenposten, the murder rate of Norway has since 2002 been roughly half that of neighbour country Sweden.

=== Sexual violence ===
In 2018, 2,564 cases of rape were reported to the police.

=== Domestic violence ===
According to Norwegian police statistics, 5,284 cases of domestic violence were reported in 2008. These cases ranged from serious acts of violence such as murder and attempted murder to physical assault. The number of reported cases of domestic violence increased by 500 percent from 2005 to 2011.

=== Organized crime ===
Organized crime operates on a small scale, but has seen an upscale in the recent years. Drug trafficking, petty theft, and home burglary rings typify organized crime, which is often associated within immigrant youth communities or transiting criminal rings like the Foxtrot from Sweden.

The Hells Angels Motorcycle Gang has been involved in weapons and drugs offences in Norway. Norwegian bikers also took part in the Nordic Biker War between 1994 and 1997.

== Crime by location ==
=== Oslo ===
According to the Oslo Police, they receive more than 15,000 reports of petty thefts annually. The rate is more than seven times the number per-capita of Berlin. Approximately 0.8% of those cases get solved. In the first 6 months of 2014, the number of petty thefts has declined by approximately 30%.

Oslo has witnessed annual spikes in sexual assault cases in years leading up to 2012.

== Crime dynamics ==
Although Norway is today a country with a low level of criminality, historically this was not always the case. Violence was very common in Viking Age Norway. An examination of Norwegian human remains from the Viking Age found that 72% of the examined males and 42% of the examined females had suffered weapon-related trauma.

A large proportion of the crime that is carried out in Norway is committed by Norwegians while 34 percent of the Norwegian prison population are foreigners.

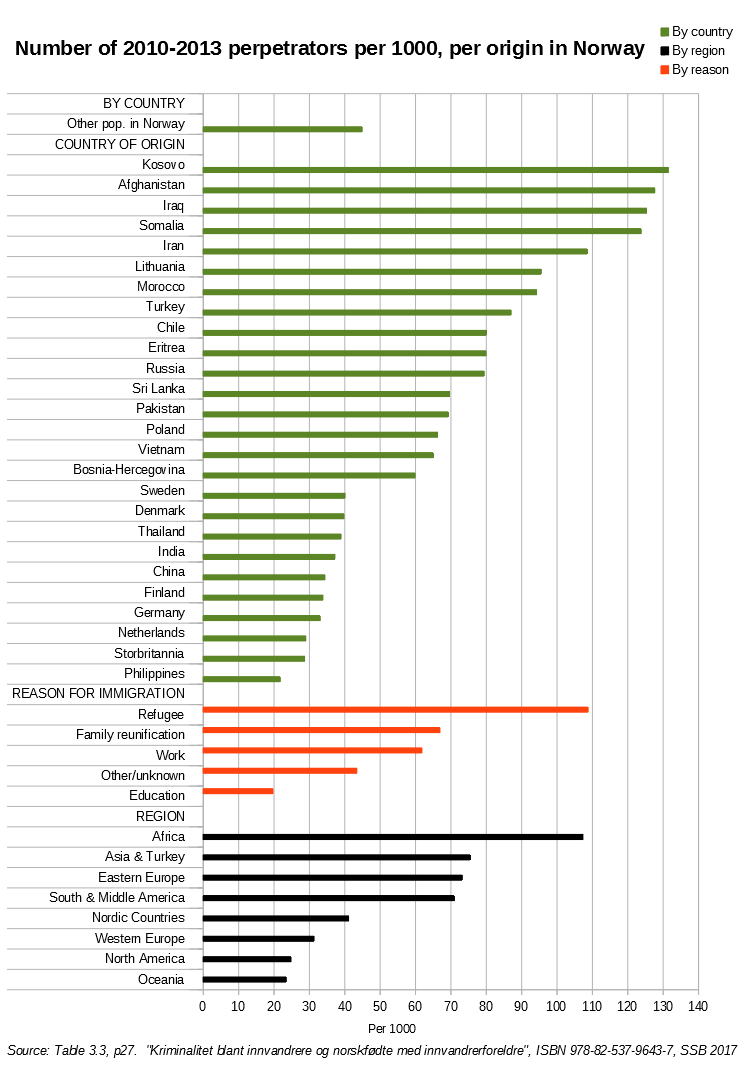
Bar chart showing number of perpetrators aged 15 and older per 1000 residents per foreign-born population for the years 2010–2013, according to Statistics Norway. Each country of origin has four bars, with M1 (green) representing the proportion of perpetrators unadjusted for socioeconomic factors, M2 (purple) symbolizing adjustment for age and gender, M3 (yellow) adjustment for residence, and M4 (blue) adjustment for employment. Over-representation is largely dependent on the M2-M4 variables, and drops significantly when they are taken into consideration.

The overall probability that a person living in Norway would be convicted for a felony (Norwegian: forbrytelse) was increased by about 0.5 percentage points for the immigrant compared to non-immigrant populations for felonies committed in the years 2001–2004. The incidence was especially high among immigrants from Kosovo, Morocco, Somalia, Iraq, Iran and Chile, and reached more than 2% in all these groups. In comparison, the incidence in the non-immigrant population was about 0.7%. Incidence was lower than for the non-immigrant population among immigrants from among others, Western European countries, Eastern Europe except Poland, the Balkans and Russia, the Philippines, China and North America. Incidence was also higher for persons with two immigrant parents for all countries of origin, including Nordic and Western European countries. When the data was corrected for the population group's age and gender structure (the most over-represented immigrant groups also have a considerable over-representation of young men), place of residence (rural–central) and employment situation, the over-representation was found to be significantly lower, especially for those groups which had the highest incidence in the uncorrected statistics. For some groups, among them immigrants from Kosovo, Bosnia-Herzegovina, Poland, Russia, Ukraine and the other Eastern European countries, the corrected incidences did not differ significantly from the non-immigrant population.

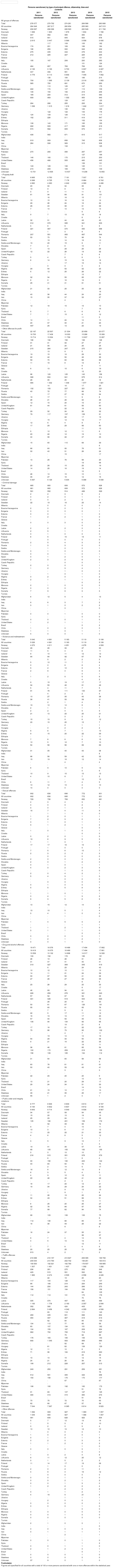
Total persons sanctioned in Norway by principal type of offence, citizenship and year, 2011–2015 (click image to view).

In 2017, a Statistics Norway report on crime in Norway was ordered by the immigration minister Sylvi Listhaug. According to Statistics Norway, since there is a generally low proportion of crime across all resident populations, it limited the scope of the paper to figures for individual nations from which at least 4,000 immigrants lived in Norway as of 1 January 2010. In the 2010–2013 period, the proportion of foreign-born perpetrators of criminal offences aged 15 and older per 1000 residents in Norway was found to be highest among immigrants from South and Central America (164.0), Africa (153.8), and Asia including Turkey (117.4), and lowest among immigrants from Eastern Europe (98.4), other Nordic countries (69.1), and Western Europe outside the Nordic region (50.7). This was compared to averages of 44.9 among native Norwegians and 112.9 among Norway-born residents with parents of foreign origin. Among individual countries of origin for which figures were provided, the estimated proportion of foreign-born perpetrators was highest among immigrants from Kosovo (131.48), Afghanistan (127.62), Iraq (125.29), Somalia (123.81), and Iran (108.60). Over-representation largely depended on variables such as gender and age structure (M2) and employment (M4), with residence (M3) having a negligible effect on the total. When adjusted for these variables, the unadjusted proportion (M1) of the foreign-born perpetrators of criminal offences during the same period dropped significantly in the adjusted estimates: Kosovo (113 M2; 106 M4), Afghanistan (93 M2; 85 M4), Iraq (102 M2; 92 M4), Somalia (102 M2; 89 M4), and Iran (98 M2; 91 M4). Immigrants from Poland were the only over-represented population for which all three adjustable variables, including residence, could explain their over-representation.

According to Statistics Norway, as of 2015, a total of 260,868 persons residing in Norway incurred sanctions. Of these, most were citizens of countries in Europe (240,497 individuals), followed by Asia (2,899 individuals), Africa (2,469 individuals), the Americas (909 individuals), and Oceania (92 individuals). There were also 13,853 persons sanctioned who had unknown citizenship, and 149 persons sanctioned without citizenship. The five most common countries of origin of foreign citizens in Norway who incurred sanctions were Poland (7,952 individuals), Lithuania (4,227 individuals), Sweden (3,490 individuals), Romania (1,953 individuals) and Denmark (1,728 individuals).

== Drugs ==
The Norwegian drug market is stable, with cannabis most commonly used and seized by law enforcement agencies, while amphetamines such as MDMA, and other synthetic psychoactive substances and pharmaceuticals decrease in importance. There has been a sharp drop in heroin use, but cocaine remains more significant.

In 2022, the Supreme Court found that drug addicts should be allowed to possess drugs without punishment. Subsequently, the Attorney General announced that possession of less than 5 grams of heroin, cocaine and amphetamine would not be pursued by the police or prosecution.

== Prevention ==
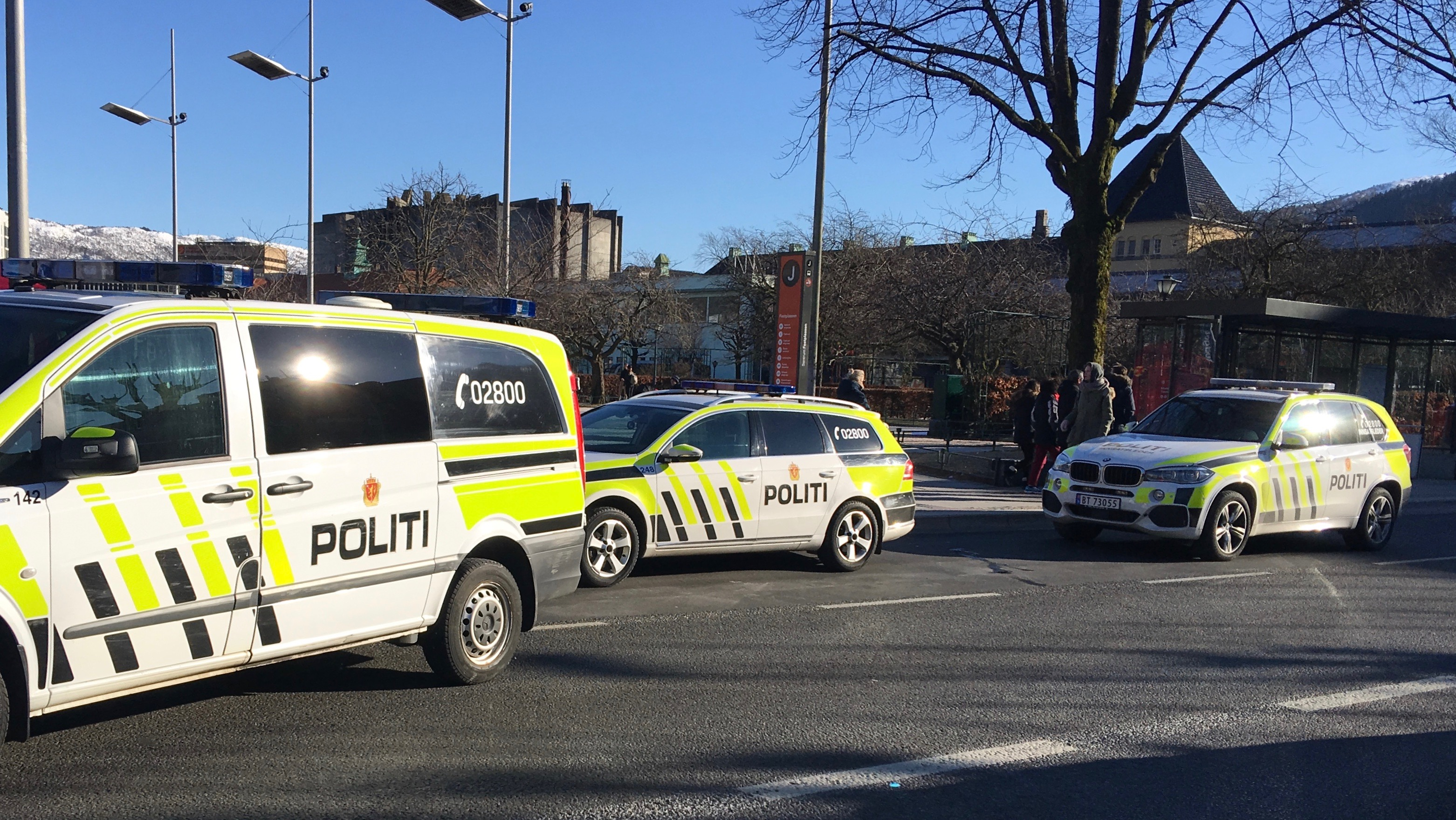
Police cars in Bergen in 2018

=== Policing ===
Norway has 188 police officers per 100,000 people.

=== Research ===
Several research organisations conduct research of different aspects of crime and crime prevention. In 2004, the Government established the Norwegian Centre for Violence and Traumatic Stress Studies with the national responsibility for violence research in Norway, including sexual and domestic violence.

== See also ==
- Human trafficking in Norway
- Incarceration in Norway
- Norwegian Police Service
