= Lars Harnes =

Norwegian outlaw biker and gangster

- Born: 1968 (age 57–58); Oslo, Norway
- Occupations: Outlaw biker, gangster
- Known for: National president of the Bandidos in Norway
- Allegiance: Bandidos MC
- Convictions: Torture, sexual assault (2003); Robbery (2006); Conspiracy to make serious threats (2020)
- Penalty: 6 years' imprisonment (2003); 8 years' imprisonment (2006); 1 year and 4 months' imprisonment (2020)

Lars Harnes (born 1968) is a Norwegian outlaw biker and gangster who served as the national president of the Bandidos Motorcycle Club in Norway.

== Biography ==
Harnes was a founding member of the Norwegian branch of the Bandidos, which was established in 1995 during the Nordic Biker War. He went on to serve as the club's national president. On 10 March 1996, Harnes was shot in the chest and wounded by Hells Angels member Torkjell "Rotta" ("Rat") Alsaker in the arrivals lobby at Oslo Airport, Fornebu after he returned from a Bandidos function in Helsinki, Finland. Alsaker, president of the Oslo Hells Angels chapter, was found guilty of shooting Harnes and sentenced to three years in prison in November 1998. In 1999, Harnes met with Prime Minister of Norway Kjell Magne Bondevik during an anti-violence event.

He was sentenced in March 2001 to six months' imprisonment for violence and robbery. Prior to this, he was convicted seven times previously in Norway and once in Sweden for violence, intimidation and criminal damage, violation of the Firearms Act, and aggravated larceny.

In 2003, Harnes was sentenced to six years in prison after being convicted of abuse and sexual assault. The year before, he had held a couple captive over the course of a day as a result of a debt dispute. He subjected the man to violent abuse and attempted to rape the man's girlfriend. While on leave from prison on 29 August 2004, Harnes – along with right-wing extremist Daniel de Linde and Petter Tharaldsen, a member of the former Tveita gang – robbed a Den norske Bank money transport vehicle at gunpoint of NOK2.6 million in Aker Brygge, Oslo. Harnes was sentenced to an additional eight years' imprisonment for the robbery in February 2006. During the robbery trial, he was diagnosed with "mixed personality disorder with dyssocial and impulsive traits" by experts in the district court. Harnes was released from prison on 27 August 2013.

Harnes was arrested in Sinsenveien, Oslo on 21 July 2015 after police had observed him six times over that summer at the home of Imran "Uncle Skrue" Saber, David Toska's former "finance minister". Police believed Harnes – who arrived at the garage on a stolen Vespa scooter, wearing nylon clothing with the seams taped together along with a balaclava and helmet, and armed with a loaded Ruger pistol fitted with a silencer – was there to liquidate Saber on behalf of another perpetrator of the NOKAS robbery, Metkel Betew. In addition to attempted murder, he was also charged in a drug case relating to the importation of MDMA and hashish. Both Harnes and Betew were acquitted of attempted murder, first in the district court and later in the court of appeal. The district court ruled that Harnes intended to kill Saber, but that it never got so far that it could be considered an attempted murder. He was also cleared of the drug charge. Harnes was, however, convicted of attempting to make serious threats against Saber. Sentenced to one year and four months' imprisonment on 12 June 2020, he was released immediately due to time already served in custody while awaiting trial.

A resident of Lørenskog, Harnes is a father of three. He reportedly converted to Catholicism while in prison.

== See also ==
- Bandidos MC in Norway
