= Retslægerådet =

Danish medico-legal institution

Retslægerådet ("the council of coroners") is a Danish institution under the Ministry of Justice (Denmark). Its job is to guide the authority body on medical questions in legal cases. The council advised up to 2000 times in 2006. Most of their cases are about psychiatry.
