= Jim Tinndahn =

Danish outlaw biker and gangster

- Born: Jan Leif Tinndahn; 27 December 1961 (age 64); North Zealand, Denmark
- Other names: "Big Jim", "Solkongen"
- Occupations: Outlaw biker, gangster, auto mechanic
- Years active: 1980–
- Known for: President of the Bandidos in Europe and Asia
- Successor: Michael Rosenvold
- Allegiance: 666 MC; Morticians MC; Undertakers MC; Bandidos MC (1993–)
- Convictions: Aggravated drunk driving, gross negligence in traffic and grievous bodily harm (2015)
- Penalty: 9 months' imprisonment (2015)

Jan Leif Tinndahn (born 27 January 1961), also known as "Big Jim" and "Solkongen" ("Sun King"), is a Danish outlaw biker and gangster who served as the president of the Bandidos Motorcycle Club in Europe between 1994 and 2012.

== Early life ==
The son of factory worker parents, Tinndahn was born in North Zealand and described his childhood as "an ordinary working class upbringing". He struggled in school as a result of dyslexia, and was reportedly quiet and introverted. Tinndahn instead took an interest in mopeds, and he later trained as a mechanic, an occupation from which he was granted early retirement due to spinal arthritis. Despite disapproval from his parents, Tinndahn, along with his brother, became involved with outlaw motorcycle clubs at the age of seventeen, joining and later serving as president of the 666 club. He married and fathered three sons.

== Bandidos ==
Tinndahn became a member of the Zealand-based Morticians Motorcycle Club, which was initially a support club of the Hells Angels before disputes between the clubs led to the Morticians breaking away from the Angels in late 1988. When the Hells Angels began a strategy of suppressing smaller clubs in the early 1990s, the Morticians aligned with other bikers opposed to or rejected by the Angels, merging to form the Undertakers MC. The Undertakers, of which Tinndahn was president, established two chapters – "Northland", based in Stenløse, and "East Coast", in Hørsholm. Seeking protection from the Hells Angels by joining a larger international club, Tinndahn and the Undertakers contacted Bandidos leaders in the United States and France in 1992. After serving as prospective members for a time, the Undertakers "patched over" to join the Bandidos on 17 December 1993. The Hells Angels permitted the Bandidos' expansion into Scandinavia on the condition that they confine themselves to their two original chapters in Denmark. As leader of the Bandidos, Tinndahn had no intention of adhering to the Hells Angels' protocol, and his club made the Morbids MC across the Øresund Strait in Helsingborg a probationary chapter in January 1994. The Bandidos' amalgamation of the Morbids infuriated the Malmö Hells Angels chapter, who declared war on the Helsingborg club.

The events in Scania led to the outbreak of the Nordic Biker War. As violence escalated, leaders of the Bandidos and the Hells Angels in the U.S. attempted to bring an end to the conflict diplomatically. The Bandidos' "mother chapter" in Houston was unable to control its probate chapter in Helsingborg, however, as Tinndahn continued to support the Morbids' retaliation against the Angels. He was appointed as the Bandidos' European president, and transferred from the Stenløse-based Northland chapter to the Helsingborg chapter in June 1995. Tinndahn received the sobriquet "Solkongen" ("Sun King") from his fellow Bandidos members in reference to King Louis XIV of France, who ruled under a system of absolute monarchy. He selected Claus Bork Hansen as his personal bodyguard. The conflict steadily worsened after the Northland chapter became the Bandidos' European headquarters in August 1995. By the summer of 1997, hostilities between the Bandidos and the Hells Angels had effectively came to an end as the conflict was producing no clear victor, and the bikers' businesses were being negatively affected. Tinndahn was among the initiators of the mediation process that led to the end of the war. On 25 September 1997, he and Hells Angels president Bent "Blondie" Svane Nielsen held a live televised press conference and announced an end to the biker war. Although not disclosed to the public, Tinndahn and Nielsen had signed a peace treaty designating each club's territory, right down to individual bars, cafés and nightclubs. During and after the biker war, the eloquent Tinndahn became a figure in the Danish media, participating in television interviews and debates with civic groups campaigning for the removal of motorcycle clubs from the local community. In June 2010, he announced that the peace treaty between the Bandidos and the Hells Angels had collapsed, partly because the Angels had breached terms of the agreement by admitting six Bandidos members.

Tinndahn was arrested and charged with aggravated theft after police raided the Helsingborg Bandidos chapter clubhouse, where he resided, on 29 October 2008. The raid involved between fifteen and twenty police officers and the use of a Plasan SandCat armoured car. Tinndahn was suspected in the theft of three racing motorcycles, worth a combined SEK600,000, which were stolen from a racing track garage in Falkenberg on 19 September. He was implicated in the investigation as a result of a police wiretap. According to prosecutors, Tinndahn played a leading role in the handling of the motorcycles by having them transported to Helsingborg. He denied the allegations, claiming that he was attempting to have the motorcycles returned to their owner. On 2 December 2008, Tinndahn was acquitted of the charges.

As leader of the Bandidos in Europe and Asia, Tinndahn ruled over a faction of 1,600 bikers and was among the three most powerful members of the club, along with the presidents in the U.S. and Australia. In 2011, the international Bandidos organization splintered, with the club's Western Hemisphere chapters breaking away from the Eastern Hemisphere branches. During his eighteen-year tenure as president, Tinndahn oversaw the opening of 130 club chapters. He stepped down from the role in June 2012, and was succeeded by his former vice-president, Michael "Kokken" Rosenvold.

At approximately 2:00 am on 7 October 2012, Tinndahn crashed his Audi Q7 near Malmö's Emporia shopping mall while returning to Helsingborg from a Bandidos party in the Malmö suburb of Bunkeflostrand. While Tinndahn escaped with minor injuries, his passenger, fellow Bandidos member Carlos Åkesson, suffered brain damage and remained in a coma until his death on 18 December 2014 as a result of cardiac arrest. Tinndahn was questioned by police after the incident, although he was not initially charged with a crime despite a blood test showing traces of benzoylecgonine and tetrahydrocannabinol in his system. Following Åkesson's death, Tinndahn initially did not comply with a police summons for further questioning, and it was suspected that he may have fled the country as he had reportedly been missing since June 2014. He ultimately contacted police in February 2015, at which time he was formally indicted. On 28 December 2015, Tinndahn was convicted of aggravated drunk driving, gross negligence in traffic and grievous bodily harm at Malmö District Court and sentenced to nine months in prison. This was his first custodial sentence despite previous convictions for possession of stolen goods, illegal gun possession and traffic violations. In July 2016, the Scania and Blekinge Court of Appeal dismissed the charges of aggravated drunk driving and gross reckless driving, and reduced Tinndahn's sentence to probation and a fine of SEK5,000.

Tinndahn has kept a significantly lower profile since resigning as Bandidos president and he reportedly moved back to Denmark after residing in Helsingborg for several years. In August 2020, he made a rare public appearance at a Bandidos "show of force" event in Næstved at a time when the club was involved in a conflict with Satudarah on Zealand.
