= Dalby, Faxe =

Town in Faxe Municipality, Denmark

Dalby
- Town
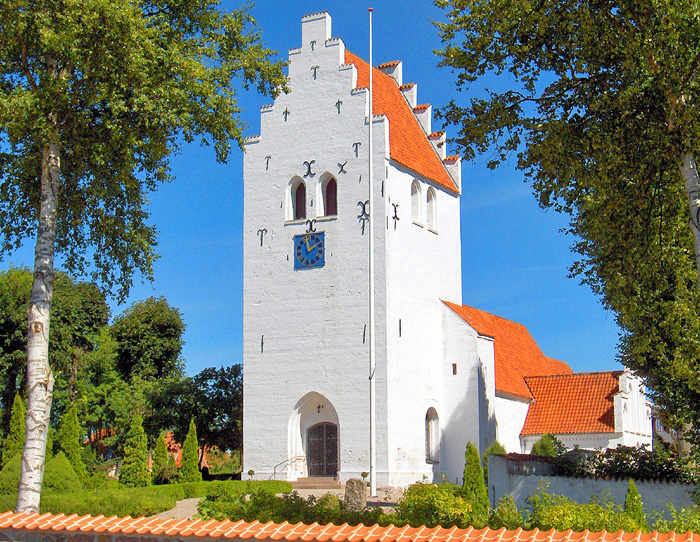
- Sønder Dalby Church in Dalby

- Location in Denmark Dalby (Denmark Region Zealand)
- Coordinates: 55°18′48″N 12°3′38″E
- Country: Denmark
- Region: Zealand (Sjælland)
- Municipality: Faxe
- Parish: Sønder Dalby Parish

Area
  - Urban: 1.8 km^{2} (0.69 sq mi)

Population (2026)
  - Urban: 2,506
  - Urban density: 1,400/km^{2} (3,600/sq mi)
- Time zone: UTC+1 (CET)
  - Summer (DST): UTC+2 (CEST)
- Postal code: DK-4690 Haslev

Dalby is a town in Faxe Municipality, in Region Zealand, Denmark.

Sønder Dalby Church stands in the centre of the town.

Dalby Hotel is located on the southwestern outskirts of the town at the road between Køge and Vordingborg.
