= Jørn Nielsen =

Danish mobster

- Born: 5 June 1960 (age 65); Gladsaxe, Denmark
- Other names: Jønke
- Known for: Spokesman of the Hells Angels Danish chapters
- Website: http://www.jønke.nu

Jørn Nielsen (born 5 June 1960) is a Danish former mobster and high-ranking Hells Angels member.

== Life ==
Nielsen's criminal career began in 1975 when he was arrested for fighting at a bar as a 15-year-old. In 1978, he was sentenced to two and a half years in prison for stabbing another man in a bar. He bought his first motorcycle in 1978 and when he was released from prison in 1980, he founded the Hells Angels Motorcycle Club's first chapter in Denmark, located in Nørrebro, Copenhagen.

On 25 May 1984, Nielsen murdered Henning Norbert Knudsen, better known as "Makrel", the national president of the rival Bullshit MC. Nielsen gunned down Knudsen with a submachine gun on his driveway and while Knudsen's wife looked on, calmly walked up to the corpse, kicked it over to avoid looking at his face, and fired several more rounds into his body to ensure that Knudsen was dead. He then fled to Canada where he became member of the East End Vancouver chapter of the Hells Angels under an alias. The East End Vancouver chapter is considered to be the most violent Hells Angel chapter in western Canada. He was apprehended and given a sixteen-year prison sentence when he was extradited to Denmark.

In 1985 while he was on the run from justice, Nielsen wrote a best-selling memoir, Mit Liv (My Life), where he portrayed himself as a victim of Danish society. In Mit Liv, Nielsen wrote about his appearance: "Dirty, ragged clothes, and preferably with as many offensive symbols as possible. White Power T-shirts, swastikas and other Nazi badges could really get the bourgeois animals out of the armchair". By his own admission, Nielsen enjoyed shocking the respectable Danish middle class with outrageous antics and embracing Nazi symbols. Denmark was occupied by Nazi Germany from 1940 to 1945, and the use of Nazi symbols was considered to be especially offensive in Denmark.

He was transferred to a Danish prison in 1988. Nielsen frequently appeared on Danish television and radio where he defended the Hells Angels as merely misunderstood outcasts as he argued that Danish society was conformist and oppressive, and that he was being persecuted for not conforming. Nielsen became a celebrity in Denmark, and served as an unofficial spokesman for the Hells Angels from prison. In 1996, attempts were made on his life by Bandidos, when the "Great Nordic Biker War" raged. On 1 September 1997, the Danish film director Erik Clausen told the media that Nielsen's books were "full of lies" and "distorted". Nielsen sued Clausen for libel, and lost the case in 1999 with a judge ruling that Clausen's statement did not damage's Nielsen's reputation. He was paroled in summer 1998, but was put back into prison in 2001 after the death of a man at an Aalborg nightclub in August 2001. He was sentenced to four years in prison.

On 27 December 2007, Nielsen was attacked and stabbed in the streets of Nørrebro. During the ensuing fight the perpetrator was also stabbed, and consequently Nielsen was arrested. He remained in custody until 15 October 2008. On 6 February 2009, Nielsen was acquitted of aggravated assault.

On 18 November 2020, Nielsen was expelled from the Hells Angels. According to several newspaper articles Nielsen was booted from the club with status "out" which, in effect, means so called bad standing. Nielsen at present is living in self-imposed exile in New Zealand.

== Books ==
- Sher, Julian; Marsden, William (2006). Angels of Death: Inside the Bikers' Empire of Crime. Toronto: Alfred Knopf Canada. ISBN 9780307370327.
