= List of outlaw motorcycle club conflicts =

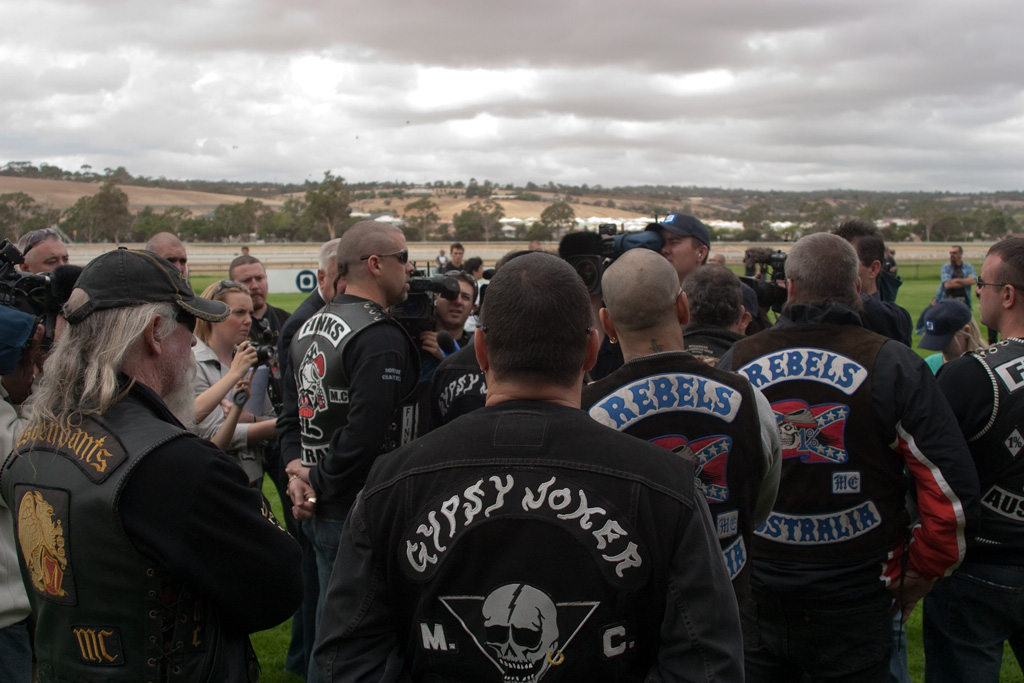
Motorcycle club members meet at a run in Australia in 2009.

An outlaw motorcycle club is a motorcycle subculture. It is generally centered on the use of cruiser motorcycles, particularly Harley-Davidsons and choppers, and a set of ideals that purport to celebrate freedom, nonconformity to mainstream culture, and loyalty to the biker group.

This article contains a list of conflicts involving outlaw motorcycle clubs.

== Australia ==
| Conflict | Combatant 1 | Combatant 2 | Outcome | Killed | Wounded |
|---|---|---|---|---|---|
| Bandidos–Comancheros conflict (1984–present) | Bandidos | Comancheros | Ongoing: The Milperra massacre marked the start of the conflict; Both groups fight to assert their dominance in Australia; Multiple events of police crackdown over the war and over 400 arrests as of 2008 | 7+ | 50+ |
| Four Clubs–Mongrel Mob War (1989) | Alliance of the Four Club Policy: Gypsy Jokers; Club Deroes; Gods Garbage; Coffin Cheaters | Mongrel Mob | Alliance victory: Creation of alliance between four largest clubs in Australia; Mongrel Mob forced to cease territorial expansion in Perth; Police crackdown and multiple arrests made | 1 | 5 |
| Comancheros–Hells Angels conflict (2009–present) | Comancheros | Hells Angels | Ongoing: Hells Angels expansion in Australia; Both groups fight to assert their dominance in Australia; Police crackdown with over 10 arrests | 2+ | 15+ |
| Rock Machine–Rebels conflict (2009–present) | Rebels | Rock Machine | Ongoing: Rock Machine arrives in Australia in 2009, patching over members of the Rebels; Both groups fight to assert their dominance in Australia; Police crackdown with over 50 arrests | 1 | 30+ |
| Coffin Cheaters–Finks conflict (2010–present) | Coffin Cheaters | Finks | Ongoing: Tensions begins when Finks form after splitting off from Coffin Cheaters; Conflict starts with a brawl between the 2 clubs at the Kwinana Motorplex in 2010; Constant reignition of rivalry | 1+ | 15+ |
| Comancheros–Rebels conflict (2013–present) | Comancheros | Rebels | Ongoing: Both groups fight to assert their dominance in Australia; Police crackdown with over 100 arrests | 2+ | 20+ |
| Hells Angels-Rock Machine conflict in Australia (2013) | Hells Angels | Rock Machine | Ceasefire: Both groups fight to assert their control over territory in Australia; Possible truce declared | 0+ | 10+ |
| Lone Wolf-Rebels conflict (2014) | Lone Wolf MC | Rebels | Stalemate | (TBA) | (TBA) |
| Mongols-Rock Machine conflict in Australia (2021–present) | Mongols | Rock Machine | Ongoing: Both groups fight to assert their control over territory in Australia; Police crackdown with over 12 arrested | 0+ | 5+ |

== Asia ==
| Conflict | Combatant 1 | Combatant 2 | Outcome | Killed | Wounded |
|---|---|---|---|---|---|
| Hells Angels–Rebels conflict in Cambodia (2013–present) | Hells Angels | Rebels | Ongoing: Conflict begins over territorial dispute in the port town of Sihanoukville, Cambodia; Both groups fight to assert their dominance in Cambodia; Multiple events of violence and police crackdown | 1+ | 10+ |

== Balkans ==
| Conflict | Combatant 1 | Combatant 2 | Outcome | Killed | Wounded |
|---|---|---|---|---|---|
| Hells Angels–Gremium MC BiH conflict (2010) | Hells Angels | Gremium MC BiH | Stalemate: Conflict occurred at the annual "Moto Klub Brod motorijada" (motorcycle club picnic) in the town of Slavonski Brod, Croatia; A massive brawl occurs between the two groups on the last night of the celebration, with several injured on both sides | 0+ | 8+ |

== Belgium ==
| Conflict | Combatant 1 | Combatant 2 | Result | Killed | Wounded |
|---|---|---|---|---|---|
| Hells Angels-Outlaws conflict in Belgium (1998–present) | Hells Angels | Outlaws | Ongoing: Initial conflict resulted in the Hells Angels being named a criminal organization in Belgium in 1999; Tensions reignite in 2009; Constant reignition of rivalry | 4+ | 20 |

== Canada ==
| Conflict | Combatant 1 | Combatant 2 | Outcome | Killed | Wounded |
|---|---|---|---|---|---|
| First Satan's Choice-Black Diamond Riders conflict (1962) | Black Diamond Riders | Original Satan's Choice | Black Diamond Riders Victory: Black Diamond Riders emerge temporarily as dominant Club in Ontario; Members of the Satan's Choice are defeated in street fights and stripped of their "cuts"; Original Satan's Choice disbands in 1963 | 0 | 10+ |
| Battle of Pebblestone (1962) | Black Diamond Riders | Golden Hawk Riders | Black Diamond Riders Victory: Conflict occurs between multiple clubs during a meet in Toronto, Ontario | 0+ | 15+ |
| Popeyes-Devil's Disciples conflict (1968–1970) | Devil's Disciples | Popeyes | Popeyes victory: Sometimes referred to as the "First Quebec Biker War"; Popeyes become the dominant club in Quebec | 5+ | 30+ |
| Alberta Biker conflict (1970s–1990s) | Grim Reapers | Rebels Kings Crew | Stalemate: Multiple groups battle for control over the province; Police crackdown; Conflict ends when all parties are patched into the Hells Angels in the 1990s | 15+ | 50+ |
| Second Satan's Choice-Black Diamond Riders conflict (1973) | Black Diamond Riders; Vegabonds | Satan's Choice | Ceasefire: Brawl at a strip club in Toronto leads to war between the three clubs; Peace agreement reached before conflict could intensify | 0+ | 10+ |
| Sherbrooke Biker conflict (1973-1974) | Atomes | Gitans | Stalemate: Caused by dispute over the drug trade of Sherbrooke - where both gangs were based; Both clubs (reluctantly) reached an agreement to share the city's narcotics market; The Gitans would later become absorbed by the Hells Angels in 1984 as the Hells Angels' Sherbrooke charter | 6 | N/A |
| Pacific Rebels-Citoyens de la Terre conflict (1973-1974) | Pacific Rebels | Citoyens de la Terre | Pacific Rebels victory | 4 | (TBA) |
| Satan's Choice–Popeyes War (1974–1976) | Satan's Choice | Popeyes | Stalemate: First major biker conflict in Canada, fought between the country's two largest clubs; Minor proxy war between the Hells Angels and Outlaws, who supported their respective allies; Paves the way for the entry of both the Hells Angels and Outlaws into Canada in 1977 | 20 | 30+ |
| First Biker War (1977–1984) | Hells Angels | Outlaws | Hells Angels Victory: Conflict sees leaders killed on both sides; The Wild Ones have over half of their numbers killed and are forced to disband; Hells Angels consolidates power in Quebec and begins expansion across Canada; Outlaws retain powerbase in Ontario until 2000; Stage set for the Ontario Biker War in 1999 | 62-72 | +100 |
| Satan's Choice-Gold Hawk Riders conflict (1978) | Gold Hawk Riders | Satan's Choice | Satan's Choice Victory: Tensions caused due to Patch-over situation in Satan's Choice territory; Brawl occurs in a hotel and member of the Satan's Choice is shot; Sergeant at Arms of the Port Hope chapter of the GHR is killed; Six members of the Satan's Choice arrested | 1+ | 10+ |
| Bounty Hunters-Satan's Angels conflict (1980) | Bounty Hunter MC | Satan's Angels | Satan's Angels Victory: Tensions caused due to territorial disputes between Bounty Hunter MC(Victoria) and the Satan's Angels(Vancouver, Nanaimo, White Rock); Satan's Angels emerge as the dominant Club in British Columbia, absorbing the Bounty Hunters, Satan's Angels would merge with the Hells Angels in 1983 | N/A | N/A |
| First Los Bravos-Spartans conflict (1983-1985) | Los Bravos | Spartans: Silent Riders | Los Bravos Victory: Merger between the two groups collapses; Tensions caused due rape case in 1983; Conflict leads to several bombings and shootings in Winnipeg, Manitoba; Silent Riders disband | 2+ | 20+ |
| Quebec Biker War (1994–2002) | Hells Angels | Rock Machine | Stalemate: Largest biker conflict in history; Stalemate forced by police crackdown on both groups with 150 arrested from 2001 to 2002; Destruction of the Dark Circle; Hells Angels gain control over the narcotics trade in Montreal; Rock Machine merges with the Bandidos from 2001 to 2006 | 182 | 350+ |
| Loners-Satans Choice conflict (1991) | Loners | Satan's Choice | Loners Victory: A member of the Loners decapitates a member of the Satan's choice; Tensions between the two groups continue to escalate in the early 1990s; Events would contribute to the Satan's Choice-Loners War in 1995 | 1 | 0 |
| Second Los Bravos-Spartans conflict (1991-1994) | Los Bravos | Spartans | Ceasefire: Tensions reignite between the two groups, a shootout occurs and four people are shot; Several altercations between the two groups occur; Peace treaty brokered by Walter Stadnick in 1994 | 2+ | 10+ |
| Third Satan's Choice-Black Diamond Riders conflict (1992) | Black Diamond Riders | Satan's Choice | Satan's Choice Victory: Rivalry reignited over territorial dispute; Massive brawl occurs in Sudbury, Ontario and 8 members of the BDR are sent to the hospital and 1 is shot; Satan's Choice consolidates its control the area | 1 | 8+ |
| Satan's Choice–Loners War (1995) | Loners | Satan's Choice | Stalemate: Conflict was fought by two of the largest motorcycle clubs in Ontario; Diablos MC, an ally of Satan's Choice, is destroyed and absorbed by the Loners; Both parties agree to a truce in late 1995 | 3 | 15+ |
| Ontario Biker conflict (1999–2002) | Hells Angels | Outlaws | Hells Angels Victory: Also referred to as the London Biker conflict; Hells Angels consolidates power in Ontario; Police crackdowns result in over 80 arrests; Outlaws temporarily crippled in Ontario; Rivalry ongoing with multiple incidents between the two groups | 2+ | 30+ |
| Rock Machine–Hells Angels conflict in Manitoba (2009–2011) | Hells Angels: Redline MC | Rock Machine: Vendettas | Rock Machine Victory: Initial police crackdown leaves Hells Angels crippled in the province; Creation of the Vendettas to aid in the conflict; Redline MC, a support club of the Hells Angels, is defeated; Creation of several more Rock Machine support clubs; Rock Machine consolidates power in Manitoba until police crackdowns in 2013 | 4 | 20+ |
| Loners-Vagos conflict (2012–ongoing) | Loners | Vagos | Ongoing: Tensions grow over territorial dispute in Ontario; Conflict began in 2012, due to a split in the Loners Peterborough chapter, at least 4 members joined the Vagos; Conflict becomes violent with several fights and assaults | 0+ | 5+ |
| Hells Angels-Warlocks conflict in Canada (2014–ongoing) | Hells Angels | Warlocks | Ongoing: Tensions grow over territorial disputes; When the conflict began in 2014, the police documented 20 incidents between the two groups in just two months; Possible peace agreement reached | 0+ | 20+ |
| Rock Machine civil conflict (2015–2022) | Rock Machine | Rock Machine Faction | Rock Machine Victory: A Canadian is influenced by the individual responsible for the split in Germany, causing him to create a splinter faction; After several incidents RM faction seemingly dissolves in 2018; Creation of RM Black & White faction in 2021 would see a momentary reignition of conflict until it dissolved in 2022 | 3+ | 1+ |
| Hells Angels-Rebels conflict in Canada (2021–ongoing) | Hells Angels | Rebels | Ongoing: Five people from both sides were treated in hospital for stab wounds in Cranbrook, B.C.; Tensions are expected by authorities to increase | 0 | 5 |

== Germany ==
| Conflict | Combatant 1 | Combatant 2 | Result | Killed | Wounded |
|---|---|---|---|---|---|
| Bandidos–Hells Angels conflict in Germany (2004–ongoing) | Bandidos | Hells Angels | Ongoing: Conflict arose in 2004 as the Bandidos encroached on the Hells Angels' territory across northern Germany; The war also spread to the east of the country in 2006 when both clubs expanded into the Cottbus area.; Multiple peace agreements signed; Constant reignition of rivalry | 2+ | 19+ |
| Bandidos–Rock Machine conflict in Germany (2011–ongoing) | Bandidos | Rock Machine | Ongoing: Rock Machine's expansion across Europe caused friction with some Bandidos chapters; Conflict started in Germany but has reignited in Scandinavia in separate conflicts | 2+ | 10+ |
| Rock Machine Civil conflict in Germany (2015–ongoing) | Rock Machine | Rock Machine Blue | Stalemate: Internal disputes cause the split in the Rock Machine Germany; Both groups denounce each other | 1+ | 10+ |
| Bandidos–Freeway Riders conflict (2018–present) | Bandidos: Iron Bloods 58 | Freeway Riders | Ongoing: Conflict started after violent altercations between the two groups; Police crackdown with 7 arrested | 0+ | 4+ |

== Ireland ==
| Conflict | Combatant 1 | Combatant 2 | Result | Killed | Wounded |
|---|---|---|---|---|---|
| The Battle of Kilmeaden (1990) | Hells Angels: 100+ supporters | Irish Alliance: Freewheelers; Devils Disciples(IRE); Vikings; Road Tramps; Pagans(ENG); The Otters | Stalemate: Occurred at annual 1990 Kilmeaden motorcycle show; Incident results in a massive brawl with dozens injured; Largest Irish clubs joined and formed an alliance resisting international club influence | 0 | 30+ |
| Caballeros-Road Tramps conflict (2015–present) | Caballeros | Road Tramps | Ongoing: Both groups fight to assert their control over territory in Ireland; Police crackdown | 1+ | 10+ |

== Italy ==
| Conflict | Combatant 1 | Combatant 2 | Result | Killed | Wounded |
|---|---|---|---|---|---|
| Hells Angels-Bandidos conflict in Italy (2003–ongoing) | Hells Angels | Bandidos | Ongoing: Tensions began over territorial disputes; Significant conflict in Alto-Adige | 1 | 15+ |

== Netherlands ==
| Conflict | Combatant 1 | Combatant 2 | Result | Killed | Wounded |
|---|---|---|---|---|---|
| Hells Angels–Mongols conflict in Holland (2016–present) | Hells Angels | Mongols | Ongoing: Altercation occurs at Van der Valk hotel in Rotterdam; A brawl occurs between the two clubs; Constant reignition of rivalry | 0+ | 5+ |

== New Zealand ==
| Conflict | Combatant 1 | Combatant 2 | Outcome | Killed | Wounded |
|---|---|---|---|---|---|
| Auckland Brawl (1971) | Hells Angels | Mongrel Mob | Stalemate: Conflict results in a huge brawl in central Auckland, between the Hells Angels, Highway 61 MC, the Polynesian Panthers and the Mongrel Mob; Police crackdown with "multiple" arrests | N/A | N/A |
| Devils Henchmen-Epitaph Riders conflict (1973) | Devils Henchmen | Epitaph Riders | Epitaph Riders Victory: Increased tensions between the two groups lead to shootings; Police crackdown and multiple arrests made | 1+ | 5+ |

== Scandinavia ==
| Conflict | Combatant 1 | Combatant 2 | Result | Killed | Wounded |
|---|---|---|---|---|---|
| Copenhagen Biker War (1983–1985) | Bullshit MC | Hells Angels: Morticians MC; Black Sheep MC | Hells Angels victory: Hells Angels consolidate power in Denmark; Also known as the First Biker War in Scandinavia, not to be confused with the Canadian conflict of the same name. | 11 | +30 |
| Nordic Biker War (1994–1997) | Bandidos | Hells Angels | Stalemate: Bandidos and Hells Angels clash for control in Scandinavia; Peace treaty in 1997; Each side retains designated territory; Crackdown by police services; As of August 2026, it remains the deadliest biker war in Scandinavia and is sometimes referred to as the "Great Nordic Biker War". | 11 | 96 |
| Bandidos MC Finland internal conflict (1999–2001) | Bandidos | Bandidos: Undertakers MC | Ceasefire: Conflict caused by internal rift in leadership; Multiple incidents occur between the two groups; Police crackdown and unification | 1+ | 5+ |
| Bandidos–Rock Machine conflict in Scandinavia (2013–ongoing) | Bandidos | Rock Machine | Ongoing: Conflict starts over territorial disputes in Sweden and Norway; Bandidos attempt to assassinate President of Rock Machine Sweden; In 2017, members of the Rock Machine Norway are charged for killing a Bandidos prospect | 2+ | 10+ |
| Hells Angels–Satudarah conflict in Denmark (2014) | Hells Angels | Satudarah | Ceasefire: War started after brawl between the two clubs at a local sports bar; Police crackdown with 28 arrested; Peace agreement in 2014 | 0 | 10+ |
| Bandidos–Satudarah conflict in Denmark (2014–2019) | Bandidos | Satudarah | Stalemate: Satudarah MC, a club originating from the Netherlands, expand into Denmark around 2013.; Bandidos members in Denmark defect to Satudarah, causing conflict.; Police crackdown.; Peace agreement in June 2019 | 0 | 15+ |
| Bandidos-Gremium conflict in Norway (2017–ongoing) | Bandidos | Gremium Motorcycle Club | Ongoing: Gremium MC, a motorcycle club originating from Germany, sets up a chapter within Bandidos territory, igniting the conflict.; Police crackdown | 0+ | 10+ |
| No Surrender-Rock Machine conflict (2018–present) | No Surrender | Rock Machine | Ongoing: Tensions commence after No Surrender patches over members of Rock Machine MC Norway.; Conflict takes off in Jessheim, Norway, where both groups engage in a brawl that leaves several injured; Police crackdown | 0+ | 15+ |

== Russia ==
| Conflict | Combatant 1 | Combatant 2 | Result | Killed | Wounded |
|---|---|---|---|---|---|
| Night Wolves-Three Roads conflict (2012) | Night Wolves | Three Roads MC (Tri Dorogi): Bandidos | Ceasefire: Conflict breaks out over want to keep US motorcycle clubs influence out of Russia; Peace agreement in 2012 | 1 | 10+ |

== South Africa ==
| Conflict | Combatant 1 | Combatant 2 | Result | Killed | Wounded |
|---|---|---|---|---|---|
| Hells Angels-MACS conflict (2018) | Hells Angels | MACS MC | Ceasefire: Tensions between the two clubs had been on the rise for years; Conflict breaks out when an associate of the Hells Angels shot and killed a member of the MACS; Both groups battle for territory in South Africa | 1+ | N/A |

== United Kingdom ==
| Conflict | Combatant 1 | Combatant 2 | Result | Killed | Wounded |
|---|---|---|---|---|---|
| Battle of Chelsea Bridge (1970) | Road Rats MC: Nightingales; Windsors; Jokers | Outcasts: Chelsea chapter; Essex chapter | Stalemate: Alliance between smaller clubs is formed to take on the Outcasts in England; Resulting brawl between the two groups occurs on the Chelsea Bridge; Police crackdown "multiple" arrests | 0+ | 20+ |
| Hells Angels-Satan's Slaves conflict (1979) | Hells Angels | Satans Slaves | Stalemate: Conflict starts in Berkshire, England, when a brawl occurs between the two groups; police crackdown with 11+ arrested; Multiple incidents between the two groups have occurred | N/A | N/A |
| Hells Angels Civil conflict in England (1979-1985) | Hells Angels | Hells Angels (Windsor) | Unification: Conflict starts due to an unsanctioned HAMC chapter in Windsor, England; Multiple incidents between the two groups have occurred; Police crackdown with 28+ arrested; Windsor chapter joins Hells Angels in 1985 | 0+ | 3+ |
| Road Rats-Satan's Slaves conflict (1983) | Road Rats MC | Satans Slaves | Satan's Slaves Victory: Conflict starts in Cookham, England, when a brawl occurs between the two groups involving over 30 bikers; police crackdown; Multiple incidents between the two groups have occurred | 2+ | 10+ |
| Cycle Tramps-Road Rats conflict (1989) | Cycle Tramps | Road Rats MC | Road Rats Victory: Conflict starts when both clubs had an altercation at the Carlisle pub in Hastings, England; A member of the Road Rats shoots and kills a member of the Cycle Tramps; shooter takes his life in prison | 2+ | 0+ |
| Hells Angels-Outcasts War (1997-1999) | Hells Angels | Outcasts | Stalemate | 2 | (TBA) |
| Hells Angels-Outlaws conflict in UK (1998–present) | Hells Angels | Outlaws | Ongoing: Conflict escalates in 2008; Police crackdown; Multiple incidents between the two groups have occurred | 1+ | 10+ |
| Blue Angels-Nomads conflict (2013–present) | Blue Angels | Nomads | Ongoing | | |

== United States ==
| Conflict | Combatant 1 | Combatant 2 | Result | Killed | Wounded |
|---|---|---|---|---|---|
| First Hells Angels–Outlaws conflict (1969–1970s) | Hells Angels | Outlaws | Stalemate: The rivalry began when a member of Outlaws raped the wife of a Hells Angel in 1969; In retaliation, Hells Angels members almost beat the rapist to death in New York.; Multiple sporadic incidents between the two clubs occur; Constant reignition of rivalry | | |
| Second Hells Angels–Outlaws conflict (1974–present) | Hells Angels | Outlaws | Ongoing: The second conflict between the clubs began when the Outlaws murdered three members of the Hells Angels' Lowell, Massachusetts chapter in Broward County, Florida on April 27, 1974.; Hostilities have persisted internationally in the following decades. | | |
| Breed–Pagans conflict (1960s–1998) | Breed Motorcycle Club | Pagans | Stalemate: Both clubs claim states as their territory; Police crackdown; Multiple ceasefires declared; Constant reignition of rivalry; The Breed MC eventually disbanded in 2006 following a federal law enforcement sweep. Many of its members who had successfully managed to avoid such criminal indictments either retired from the lifestyle altogether or went on to join other "one-percenter" biker groups such as the Outlaws MC (also rivals with the Pagans Motorcycle Club). | 6+ | 50+ |
| Breed-Hells Angels conflict (1971) | Breed Motorcycle Club | Hells Angels | Stalemate: Conflict began due to territorial dispute; Ceasefires declared | 5+ | 20+ |
| Outlaws-Warlocks conflict (1970s-present) | Outlaws | Warlocks | Ongoing: Conflict began due to territorial dispute; Ceasefires declared | 2+ | 15+ |
| Hells Angels–Mongols conflict (1977–present) | Hells Angels | Mongols | Ongoing: Both clubs claim California and other states as their territory; Start of San Francisco Biker War; For a time, California is split between the Mongols (South) and the Hells Angels (North); Multiple ceasefires declared; Constant reignition of rivalry | 14+ | 50+ |
| Outlaws–Sons of Silence conflict (1978–1995) | Outlaws | Sons of Silence | Stalemate: Expansion of both clubs leads to conflict in multiple states; Creation of the Confederation of Clubs, which brings an end to hostilities; Confederation of Clubs brings cohesion between groups | 6 | 20+ |
| Bandidos-Hells Angels conflict (1990s-present) | Bandidos | Hells Angels | Ongoing: Conflict began due to territorial disputes, with both groups expansion across the continental United States; Multiple ceasefires declared; Constant reignition of rivalry | 6+ | 40+ |
| Fates Assembly-Pagans conflict (1991) | Fates Assembly | Pagans | (TBA) | (TBA) | (TBA) |
| Hells Angels–Pagans conflict (1994–present) | Hells Angels | Pagans | Ongoing: Conflict began in 1994 as a result of territorial disputes; Clash between the two clubs at a Hells Angels-sponsored "Hell raiser Ball"in Plainview, New York on February 23, 2002, resulted in the arrest of 73 Pagans and 2 Angels, one biker was killed and 10 injured.; Hells Angels recruit Pagans to form a chapter in Philadelphia in 2004, resulting in the conflict flaring up between the two groups.; Philadelphia Hells Angels chapter disbands in 2005. | 5+ | 30+ |
| Boozefighters-Wino's Crew conflict (1996–present) | Boozefighters | Wino's Crew MC | Ongoing: Longtime rivalry; 3 bikers were shot and killed in California in 2014 | 3+ | 15+ |
| Hells Angels-Vagos conflict (2008-ongoing) | Hells Angels | Vagos | Stalemate: Conflict began due to territorial dispute; Ceasefires declared | 0+ | 10+ |
| Wheels of Soul-Sin City Deciples conflict (2009-present) | Sin City Deciples: Sin City Titans | Wheels of Soul | Ongoing: Longtime rivalry between both clubs.; Wheels of Soul declares "open season" on the Sin City Titans, a support club for the larger Sin City Deciples MC in 2009.; That same year, Members of Wheels of Soul allegedly shoot and kill a Sin City Titans member in St. Louis, Missouri. | 1+ | N/A |
| Outcast-Wheels of Soul conflict (2011–present) | Outcast | Wheels of Soul: Showstoppers | Ongoing: Federal investigation reports that members Wheels of Soul conspired to murder members of the rival Outcasts in 2011; A Wheels of Soul member, in addition to a member the affiliated Showstoppers club, are gunned down by James Armstrong of the Outcast MC at a party in 2014 | 2+' | N/A |
| Cossacks-Bandidos war (2013–present) | Bandidos | Cossacks | Ongoing: Most notable incident of the conflict to date is the 2015 Waco shootout | 9+ | (TBA) |
| Iron Order-Mongols conflict (2016–present) | Iron Order | Mongols | Ongoing: Conflict began with the event known as the National Western Complex shootout; Police crackdowm | 1+ | 7+ |
| Kinfolk-Bandidos conflict (2016–present) | Kinfolk MC | Bandidos: Organized Chaos | Ongoing: Kinfolk MC was formed in 2016 by former members of the Bandidos who disapproved of its leadership at the time. Chopper Dan was passed over to become the next national president after Taco was arrested. So it technically had something to do with disapproval of leader ship. But the real reason is he was mad because he should've been given the reigns and full control of the club as national president but he was disrespected. | 2 | (TBA) |
| Bandidos-Brothers East conflict (2019-present) | Bandidos: Mascareros MC | Brothers East MC (B*EAST MG) | Ongoing: Brothers East Motorcycle Club, also stylized as B*EAST MG, was founded around 2015 in Channelview, Texas, and initially operated as a support club of the Bandidos Motorcycle Club. The circumstances surrounding the groups' eventual split have not been publicly established, although their relationship had reportedly deteriorated by 2019.; According to a federal indictment, the war occurred as a result of the Bandidos' ambition to maintain a Houston-area monopoly over motorcycle clubs, demanding that a club would only be allowed to operate if they had given them permission to do so.; In 2021, a Katy-area Bandidos chapter called "Welcome to Hell" was created. According to federal prosecutors, this chapter was specifically formed to combat B*EAST. | 4+ | 6+ |
| Homietos-Bandidos war (2022–2026) | Homietos MC | Bandidos: Ghostmen MC; Barbaros MC | Stalemate: The Homietos, founded in 2015, initially operated as a support club of the Bandidos Motorcycle Club before separating from the organization in 2017, a split that contributed to the emergence of a violent rivalry between the two groups.; In March 2026, the FBI announced that a federal operation had effectively dismantled the Homietos Motorcycle Club following the indictment of several of its members on federal racketeering and murder charges. | 6 | 5 |

== See also ==
- Lennoxville massacre
- Milperra massacre
- National Western Complex shootout
- River Run riot
- Shedden massacre
- Waco shootout
