= National Western Complex shootout =

2016 Civil conflict in Colorado

Coordinates: 39.7824°N 104.9687°W

- Date: January 30, 2016; 12:48 p.m.
- Location: Denver, Colorado, U.S.
- Caused by: Rivalries between motorcycle clubs
- Methods: Shooting, stabbing, beating

Parties
Mongols Motorcycle Club; Others	Iron Order Motorcycle Club

Number
~ 30	16

Casualties
- Deaths: 1
- Injuries: 7
- Arrested: 1

On January 30, 2016, a brawl involving gunfire and knives broke out between rival motorcycle clubs at the National Western Complex, in Denver, Colorado, United States. One person was killed and seven others were injured.

== Shooting ==
On January 30, police responded to a brawl that broke out between rival motorcycle clubs inside the National Western Complex, located near the Denver Coliseum just north of Interstate 70. The Complex was hosting the 38th Annual Colorado Motorcycle Exposition, where motorcycle clubs across the country had gathered, including the Bandidos Motorcycle Club and Hells Angels.

The Iron Order Motorcycle Club had 16 of its members in attendance at the expo, and only stayed for an hour. In an attempt to leave the expo, the group left down a flight of stairs near the basement of the complex, where several Mongols had booths selling T-shirts. Three Iron Order members were separated and confronted by a much larger group of around 30 members of the Mongols Motorcycle Club, a Mongol challenged them and told them to leave. A Mongol approached them and knocked a beer out of the hands of an African American Iron Order member while yelling a racial slur at him.

A fist and knife fight broke out at 12:48 p.m., with several Iron Order members being severely beaten and stabbed. In response an Iron Order member who works for the Colorado Department of Corrections, pulled out his gun and fired one shot into the ceiling. A Mongol charged at him but was gunned down and injured. Another Mongol attempted to tackle the gunman as he fled up the stairs, but was struck and fatally injured.

An Iron Order member was handcuffed and taken into custody Saturday following the brawl.

== Victims ==
According to the medical examiner's report, seven people were injured. Three remain in critical condition, three are stable, and one other person suffered lesser injuries. The sole fatality was identified as 46-year-old Victor Mendoza, a Mongol who was shot in the chest.

== Aftermath ==
The emergency room at Rocky Mountain Regional Trauma Center, where the injured were taken, was placed on lockdown by the Denver Police Department out of fear of the conflict spreading.

Dr. Kevin McVaney of the Denver Health Medical Center said three were in critical condition, suffering gunshot wounds, while the six others were reported as being stable. The two gravely injured were said to be members of the Mongols and Iron Order.

As a result of the shooting, the second day of the motorcycle expo was cancelled.

The Denver Police Department has released few details of the incident. According to the Associated Press in 2016, the Iron Order formed in 2004 and is one of the fastest growing motorcycle clubs in the U.S.

== See also ==
- 2015 Waco shootout
