= Rock Machine–Rebels conflict =

Gang war in Australia between the Rock Machine and the Rebels

Rock Machine-Rebels conflict
- Date: 2009–Present
- Location: Perth, Western Australia, Australia
- Caused by: Narcotics trade, territorial & criminal disputes
- Result: Ongoing

Parties
Rock Machine Support: Rock Machine Canada (material support)	Rebels Motorcycle Club

Lead figures
Brent Reker Critical J (RMMC International President)	Nick Martin †

Casualties
- Deaths: 2+
- Injuries: 30+
- Arrested: 50+

The Rock Machine–Rebels conflict is an ongoing conflict between the Rock Machine and Rebels motorcycle gangs in Perth, Western Australia. The conflict began in 2009 and has continued sporadically, with both clubs competing for territory and control of criminal rackets.

== Beginning of conflict ==
The Rebels Motorcycle Club at its peak in the 2000s, was the largest club in Australia with over 70 chapters in country. They saw Australia as their territory and had several ongoing conflicts with other motorcycle clubs for dominance of the country. The first Rock Machine chapter in Australia was a Nomads chapter established in 2008. In early 2009, the Rock Machine's New South Wales chapter was created in the Sydney area. The club would set up a third chapter in the Perth suburb of Myaree in mid 2009, by then Rock Machine MC Canada President, Critical J. The defection of Rebels MC members to the Rock Machine MC sparked an ongoing violent feud between the groups.

== Conflict ==
In December 2009, Australian authorities announced that notorious Canadian Motorcycle Club the Rock Machine Motorcycle Club had opened a chapter in Perth, initially using a Kardinya gym as their clubhouse. This was seen as an act of aggression by the Australian-based Rebels Motorcycle Club, threats and verbal exchanges online between the two clubs soon occurred.

Things would heat up, when on 10 July 2010. A brawl broke out at a Metropolitan nightclub between members of both groups, several people were injured. The situation truly escalate with the fire bombing of a vehicle belonging to a Full-Patch member of the Rebels Motorcycle Club in October 2010. On 5 November 2010, a brawl occurred between 20 members of the two groups at a Mixed Martial Arts event hosted at the Joondalup Arena, several members of the Rebels are injured. On 12 November 2010. 15 Full-Patch members of the Rebels Motorcycle Club rode through the Fremantle's entertainment district, looking to provoke an incident with the Rock Machine.

On 16 November 2010. The Ink Assault, a tattoo parlour owned by the Rebels, was set ablaze by Molotov cocktails around 3:00 in the morning. A member of the Rock Machine was arrested in connection with the arson. On 19 November of the same year, another vehicle belonging to a member of the Rebels Motorcycle Club is fire bombed and destroyed. On 21 November 2010, members of the Rock Machine MC ransacked and vandalized a house in southern Perth belonging to a member of the Rebels MC causing "extensive damage" and make off with several items. On 26 November 2010, a member of the Rebels and two members of the rival Rock Machine were charged over a fight that occurred near the Royal Fremantle Golf Club in East Fremantle. A senior member of Rebels, who was allegedly attacked with a big torch and pepper spray by the Rock Machine, was later acquitted after his actions were proven to be in self defence.

On 29 November 2010, a member of the Rock Machine was charged when police uncovered a large cache of high-powered firearms in his car boot during a traffic stop on Mounts Bay Road in Crawley. The weapons seized included an automatic 7.62×39mm rifle of unknown make, while two other firearms: a 12-gauge sawed-off shotgun under the passenger seat and a stolen .44 Magnum lever-action rifle was also found, along with ammunition. On 22 January 2011, members of the Rock Machine ran into members of the Rebels at the Clink nightclub in Fremantle. This resulted in a brawl between the two groups that saw several again injured. The next day, a Spearwood tattoo parlour, the Lost Tattoo, which was owned by a member of the Rock Machine, was ransacked by a group of Rebels. The manager was assaulted and the office was trashed. On 24 January, the police drove an armoured vehicle through the front gate of the Rebels' Osborne Park chapter clubhouse, causing significant damage to the clubhouse's mezzanine level of the industrial unit, as part of their investigation into the exchanges between the two clubs. Tactical Response Group officers used an angle grinder to cut through a security gate and threw stun grenades into the building to gain access. Police stated they were unable to find anything in the raid, but then Rebels president Nick Martin demanded authorities pay for the damage to the clubhouse.

On 3 February 2011, authorities ordered an increased police presence around the Perth Courthouse as members of the Rebels and Rock Machine were gathering during a court appearance by a Rock Machine member. A Rebels member was arrested for "disorderly conduct" outside the court. On 12 February 2011, members of the Rock Machine visited a Rebels owned establishment looking to members of the Rebels MC, the Pink Duck Bar in Rockingham. No Rebels were present however a manager had to lock himself in an office to escape them. On 25 February 2011, police raided the Rock Machine MC. Large amounts of powerful high-grade explosives were seized from the Rock Machine's Myaree chapter clubhouse. Police said they confiscated enough explosive detonators and industrial-strength power gel to demolish a large building, including some placed in a hidden roof cavity. Authorities claim the quantity of high explosives had the potential to cause "extreme loss of life". The Rock Machine Canada, which is notorious for is use of high explosives was accused by Australian authorities of being involved with providing the explosives. A statement from police stated they seized "54 units of Powergel explosives in a vehicle, and 34 explosive detonators at the property. Inside the clubhouse, officers found one unit of Powergel, other types of explosives, 34 more detonators, a sawn-off 12-gauge shotgun and 19 rounds of .22 calibre ammunition."

On 18 March 2011. Rebels WA President Nick Martin was the victim of an assassination attempt by the Rock Machine, when he was shot through the elbow out the front of his Perth home. He survived the attempt with only minor surgery needed. On 24 March 2011, the police launched raids against both the Rebels and the Rock Machine, on nine separate properties in Australia. The raids resulted in the confiscation of over a dozen illegal rifles, a military practice mortar, 101 rounds of 30-30 ammunition and 136 rounds of 0.38 calibre ammunition, a 0.45, a semi-automatic pistol, 114 rounds of ammunition. Only two members of the groups were charged in these raids, however the police announced that they had charged a member of the Rock Machine with the shooting of the Rebels president earlier in the year.

In 2012, The Rock Machine opened their second chapter in Perth, City Crew Perth or South Perth chapter after several members of the Finks Motorcycle Club defected to the Rock Machine MC. The Finks also had an ongoing rivalry with the Rebels Motorcycle Club. In 2013, Rock Machine Australia and New Zealand patched over to the Bandios MC and handed their charters back to Canada.

== See also ==
- List of outlaw motorcycle club conflicts
