= Homietos Motorcycle Club =

Outlaw motorcycle gang in the United States

- Territory: Known activity in Oklahoma City, Kansas City, and Texas
- Rivals: Bandidos Motorcycle Club

The Homietos Motorcycle Club are an American outlaw motorcycle gang with reported activity and leadership in Oklahoma City, Kansas City, and Texas. Information surrounding the Homietos and its founding history is limited, however, the outlaw club in recent years has increasingly become the subject of a number of violent and well-publicized incidents involving other motorcycle clubs. It is a rival gang to the Bandidos.

== Texas I-45 killings ==
In April 2023, while en route from Texas to a funeral in Oklahoma City following a recent shootout with the Homietos, four members of the Bandidos gang, each riding in a squad of two, were shot on I-45 40 miles apart from one another. Three of the members were shot fatally while the other survived. Authorities believed that the Homeitos were behind the murders, which had been a retaliatory attack stemming from a brawl and resulting shootout that had occurred earlier that month in April at the Oklahoma City roadside saloon, The Whiskey Barrel. The shooting, in which the Bandidos Oklahoma City chapter president was killed, had been the most recent in a string of deadly encounters as part of a feud between the two gangs that has been ongoing since at least 2022.

== See also ==
- List of outlaw motorcycle clubs
- List of outlaw motorcycle club conflicts
