= Under and Alone =

2005 book by William Queen

Under and Alone: The True Story of the Undercover Agent Who Infiltrated America's Most Violent Outlaw Motorcycle Gang
- Author: William Queen
- Language: English
- Publisher: Random House
- Publication date: 2005
- Media type: Hardcover
- Pages: 288
- ISBN: 978-1-4000-6084-9
- OCLC: 56085716
- Dewey Decimal: 364.1/06/6092 B 22
- LC Class: HV6489.C2 Q44 2005

Under and Alone is a book written by undercover ATF agent William Queen and published by Random House in 2005 which chronicles his infiltration of the violent outlaw motorcycle gang, the Mongols.

== Synopsis ==
William Queen was a nearly 20-year ATF veteran as well as a motorcycle enthusiast when, in 1998, a "confidential informant" contacted Queen's superiors, offering to help place an agent inside the San Fernando Valley chapter of the Mongols. Queen's work was soon to become the most extensive undercover operation into a motorcycle gang in the history of American law enforcement.

Queen, using the alias Billy St. John, successfully infiltrated the gang by posing as a heavily bearded and long-haired motorcyclist who liked to drink beer and ride his Harley-Davidson motorcycle. After becoming a full member ("patched"), Queen eventually rose to the office of Treasurer in the organization. As Treasurer, he had access to evidence of the gang's criminal activity and was able to build a case against dozens of Mongol club members. Initially, Queen was subjected by members to tests of his fealty by taking part in and witnessing the trafficking of drugs and firearms and the theft of motorcycles, as well as driving getaway cars.

In the book Queen details how, after 28 months, he began to lose his own identity to his new persona. He explained how he learned to battle the conflicts both within the gang and within himself in order to keep his identity a secret. Despite the activities of the group, Queen also came to appreciate their camaraderie and sense of family. When the work began to have the effect of isolating Queen, he explains in the book, the Mongols began to feel like his own family, causing emotional difficulty for him when the investigation closed more than two years after it had begun.

== Film adaptation ==
Mel Gibson's production company, Icon Productions, acquired the film rights to Queen's story, with early reports indicating that Gibson himself was interested in starring as Queen. Daniel Barnz and Ned Zeman were attached to write the screenplay. However, Gibson's arrest for drunk driving and subsequent legal issues shelved any plans for a movie based on the book.
