= Finks Motorcycle Club =

Australian outlaw motorcycle club

Finks 1% Motorcycle Club
- Founded: 1969; 57 years ago
- Founded at: Sydney, Australia
- Type: Outlaw motorcycle club
- Region served: Australia, Europe, Indonesia, Mexico, New Zealand, England, United States, Chicago, New York state, Albania, Canada, Thailand

The Finks are an Australian outlaw motorcycle club that was formed in Sydney, Australia, in 1969 and now also has chapters in other states. The name comes from The Wizard of Id cartoon where the peasants, to his dismay, often proclaim, "The King is a fink!". The logo used by the Finks is of Bung, the king's jester. The pants worn by the jester used to differ in colour depending on the state the chapter resides in.

The club was restricted by government actions in South Australia. Despite rivalries, various other groups joined to protest the South Australian government's proposed "anti-bikie legislation".

It was reported in October 2013 that most members were to switch to the United States–based Mongols Motorcycle Club.

In 2019, a leader of the Finks Motorcycle Club committed suicide while awaiting charges for violent drug- and weapons-related offenses. Brent Reker moved cells shortly before he took his own life, and the incident was investigated by the Victorian Coroners Court and the findings published on 4 July 2025.

== Perth chapter ==
The Perth chapter of the Finks was formed after Troy Mercanti was expelled from the Coffin Cheaters and joined his friend and South Australian Fink member Frank Condo in forming the Perth chapter in 2008. Other eastern states members came to Perth to start the chapter, but over time all, including Condo, either left the club or returned to their original states. The commencement of the Perth chapter caused friction between the Finks and the Coffin Cheaters Perth.

The Perth Finks clubhouse has been frozen under the proceeds of crime after Mercanti's then partner Tammy Kingdon was convicted by a District Court jury in November 2010 of four counts of stealing and one count of property laundering. Kingdon funnelled money from a Coffin Cheaters trust fund set up for the daughters of Marc Chabriere, who was a Coffin Cheaters member murdered during the 1998 bikie war between the Coffin Cheaters and the Club Deroes. The stolen money from the fund was used to purchase the Finks clubhouse.

During the Motorplex brawl Fink member Stephen Wallace had three fingers severed. Finks members Clovis Chikonga, Troy Smith, Stephen Laurence Silvestro, Tristan Roger Allbeury, and Stephen Wallace were all imprisoned for two years despite pleas from their lawyer that Allbeury had bipolar disorder, ADHD and suffered post traumatic stresses.

Wallace is the long-term boyfriend of fellow convicted heroin trafficker Holly Deane-Johns, who served time in WA before arrest in Thailand in 2000 for trying to mail 10.4 grams of heroin to Perth. She was jailed in 2003 for 31 years before her prisoner transfer deal in 2007.

Allbeury is currently held on remand after being charged by Gang Crime Squad Detectives with Attempting to Pervert the Course of Justice. Allbeury is also charged with Grievous Bodily Harm over a prison assault that broke a fellow inmates jaw. In September 2012, whilst in prison, Allbeury was found with a smart phone and cannabis in his cell.

Mercanti was arrested in January 2012 by the Gang Crime Squad and jailed in March 2013 for 6 years and 10 months after pleading guilty late in his trial to domestic violence charges against his former partner Tammy Kingdon. Increasing drug and alcohol use were blamed for the 15 years of abuse. In October 2013 the Perth Finks were patched over by the Mongols MC and Rock Machine.

== Other states ==
Notorious criminal Vince Focarelli was kicked out of the Hells Angels. He then joined other clubs including the Comancheros, and set up his own club. He left the Comancheros later. He and his son Giovanni were shot at by unknown assailants in 2012. Vince was sent to the Royal Adelaide Hospital and his son died. He has refused to name any suspects even though this was not the first time he was targeted. While Vince was in hospital, he was visited by friends who are Finks members. Some Finks members also visited the funeral of Giovanni.

In 2012, Finks member Mark James Graham was charged with the attempted murder of Bandidos member Jacques Teamo in a shooting at the Robina Town Centre shopping Centre.

In 2012, Patrick Mcmillan was arrested and charged with firing a pistol at a man, and intentionally and recklessly causing serious injury to him at his Ferntree Gully home he shared with his girlfriend Rachel Osborn, theft, trespass, drug and weapon possession, dealing with proceeds of crime and traffic offences.
