= Donald Eugene Chambers =

American Marine and outlaw biker (1930–1999)

Donald Chambers
- Born: Donald Eugene Chambers; November 23, 1930; Houston, Texas, U.S.
- Died: July 18, 1999 (aged 68); El Paso, Texas, U.S.
- Other name: "Mother"
- Occupations: United States Marine, outlaw biker
- Known for: Founder of the Bandidos
- Allegiance: Bandidos MC
- Conviction: Murder
- Penalty: Life imprisonment; paroled in 1983

Donald Eugene Chambers (November 23, 1930 – July 18, 1999) was an American Marine, outlaw biker, and founder of the Bandidos Motorcycle Club. In 1972, Chambers was convicted of murdering two drug dealers and served a life sentence until his parole in 1983.

== Biography ==
Chambers served in the United States Marine Corps in the Vietnam War. Upon returning to Texas, he was employed as a longshoreman and became a member of numerous motorcycle clubs. Chambers found these clubs too tame for his tastes and founded his own, the Bandidos, on March 4, 1966 in San Leon, Texas. He named the club in honor of the Mexican bandits who lived by their own rules, and chose the club's colors—red and gold—after the official colors of the U.S. Marine Corps. The club recruited members from biker bars in Houston, Corpus Christi, Galveston, and San Antonio. By the early 1970s, the club had over one hundred members, including many Vietnam veterans.

In 1969, Chambers oversaw the kidnapping, assault, and surrender to police of a Bandidos member wanted for a murder unrelated to club business, which garnered unwanted attention from law enforcement. Chambers moved to New Mexico after he was involved in a violent gunfight with a rival gang in a bar in East End, Houston, where they had gone to negotiate a peace agreement.

On December 22, 1972, Chambers and fellow Bandidos members Jesse Fain "Injun" Deal and "Crazy" Ray Vincente abducted drug dealer brothers Marley Leon Tarver and Preston LeRay Tarver in El Paso and drove them into the desert north of the city. The two dealers were forced to dig their own graves before being shot and set on fire by the bikers. The brothers had sold baking soda to the Bandidos earlier that day, claiming it was amphetamine. Chambers, Deal, and Vincente were convicted of the murders, with a testimony given by Robert Munnerlyn, a club prospect and police informant who witnessed the event. The trio were sentenced to life imprisonment.

With Chambers in prison, Gale Jerome "Ronnie" Hodge, another former Marine, was elected the club's new national president. Hodge was known as "Mr. Prospect," because he had earned his full colors in only one month, but once elected, he went by the street name "Stepmother", in reference to Chambers' street name "Mother".

Donald's 23-year-old son, Stephen Trammell Chambers, died at Ben Taub Hospital on November 3, 1979, after being shot in the head during a dispute in the parking lot of a Houston nightclub where his wife worked as a waitress. The man charged with the murder, Leon "Stash" Dudley, allegedly fled Texas shortly afterwards and was apprehended in Euclid, Ohio in June 2016. In 2017, the charges against Dudley were dropped after it was determined that the unidentified actual killer was using Dudley's name and stolen social security number at the time of the murder.

Chambers was paroled in 1983 and later retired from his club. He settled in El Paso and resided there until his death from cancer on July 18, 1999, at the age of 68 years old. Chambers is buried at the Forest Park Lawndale Cemetery in Houston, beneath a gravestone inscribed with his name, Bandidos affiliation, and the quote, "We are the people our parents warned us about."
