= William Queen =

Retired undercover ATF agent

William "Billy" Queen Jr. is a retired undercover agent with the U.S. Bureau of Alcohol, Tobacco, Firearms and Explosives (ATF), and the author of the bestselling books Under and Alone and Armed and Dangerous.

== Career ==
Queen was raised in North Carolina, the son of an ATF agent. He went to North Carolina A&T State University to receive his degree in psychology. He served as a Special Forces soldier in the United States Army during the Vietnam War. After his discharge from the Army, he worked as a police officer in North Carolina for six years. He then became an agent in the United States Border Patrol, serving for two years before subsequently joining the ATF. Early operations involved infiltrating the Aryan Nation and the Ku Klux Klan, two white supremacist organizations. He also served on an ATF Special Response Team, a federal equivalent of a SWAT team.

In early 1998, as part of an operation to infiltrate motorcycle gangs, Queen joined the San Fernando Valley chapter of the Mongols Motorcycle Club as "Billy St. John", and was a member for 28 months. Despite his nickname, "Billy the Slow-Brain", he was successful within the ranks of bikers, even holding the position of secretary/treasurer, and then chapter vice-president. Based on the evidence he gathered while in these positions, a series of raids on May 19, 2000, by almost 700 lawmen in four states led to the arrest and indictment of 54 gang members (53 were convicted, one took the fall for a brother, and so the second party's charges were dropped). The ATF later described Queen's time undercover as "its most successful [biker gang] penetration." The operation had personal consequences for him-due to threats on his life he had to enter witness protection and he suffered permanent hearing loss due to all the time spent around loud motorcycles.

Queen was awarded the Federal Bar Association's Medal of Honor for his successful involvement with the Mongols. After the trials of the gang members, Queen retired from the ATF, and wrote Under and Alone: The True Story of the Undercover Agent Who Infiltrated America's Most Violent Outlaw Motorcycle Gang. In 2003, while it was still only a draft, film rights to the book were sold to Icon, the Hollywood production company owned by Mel Gibson. Despite early reports that Gibson himself was interested in starring in the film, it was never made because of his arrest for drunk driving and subsequent legal issues. The book became a bestseller upon its release in 2005.

Queen was also heavily featured in a 2008 episode of Outlaw Bikers, a series of National Geographic documentaries about federal agents infiltrating biker gangs.

== Bibliography ==
- Queen, William; Century, Douglas (2005). Under and Alone. Random House. pp. 272pp. ISBN 1-58836-440-2.
- Queen, William; Century, Douglas (2007). Armed and Dangerous. Random House. pp. 224pp. ISBN 978-1-4000-6577-6.
