= Cossacks Motorcycle Club =

American outlaw motorcycle club

Cossacks MC
- Original center patch of the Cossacks MC, worn during the notable Waco shootout of 2015
- Founded: 1969
- Founders: Earl Swift, Charles Hanks, Butch Cheatham, Paul Henley, Tom Eliason and Carl Blair
- Named after: The Cossacks, an East Slavic ethnic subgroup
- Founding location: Tyler, Texas
- Years active: 1962–present
- Territory: Texas, Virginia, Ohio and Indiana
- Ethnicity: Predominantly white Americans
- Membership: Around 900
- Allies: Dirty Knuckles MC (support club); Sabres MC (support club); Dragoons MC (support club); Scimitars MC (support club)
- Rivals: Bandidos MC; Chicanos MC; Diablos MC

The Cossacks Motorcycle Club or Cossacks MC are an American outlaw motorcycle club. Said to be one of the largest outlaw biker groups in the state of Texas, they are best known for their conflicts with the rival Bandidos Motorcycle Club – most notably, the 2015 Waco shootout which left seven members of the group dead. The Cossacks MC are allegedly the second-largest biker club in the state of Texas.

== History ==
The Cossacks Motorcycle Club was founded in Tyler, Texas in 1969 by a group of six bikers: Earl Swift, Charles Hanks, Butch Cheatham, Paul Henley, Tom Eliason and Carl Blair. The club was named after historical Cossack horsemen of Ukraine and southern Russia. Membership eventually grew in number, with many chapters being established across the state of Texas. Chapters of the club also exist in Ohio, Indiana and Virginia.

== Criminal allegations and incidents ==
During November 2013, Bandidos MC Abilene Chapter President was arrested for the stabbing of two members of the Cossacks - one of which was the group's Mingus chapter President: Timothy Satterwhite. The incident occurred outside a Logan's Roadhouse restaurant in Abilene, Texas.

Nearly two years later, on March 22, 2015, a total of ten Cossacks MC members forced a lone Bandidos MC member to pull off Interstate 35 near the town of Lorena (roughly 15 miles south of Waco, Texas). The members of the Cossacks then proceeded to beat the Bandidos biker with melee weapons including chains, metal pipes, and batons. Afterwards, those members of the Cossacks MC stole the motorcycle that the Bandidos MC member had been riding. That same day, A group of either Bandidos or Bandidos-affiliated bikers (support club members), approached a single member of the Cossacks Motorcycle Club at a Palo Pinto County gas station (approximately 60 miles west of Fort Worth and request that the Cossack biker remove his 'Texas' bottom rocker. The biker responded with refusal, resulting in him being hit in the head with a hammer and his Cossacks MC vest being taken off his person.

The El Paso branch of the FBI was 'tipped off' by a confidential source on April 7, 2015 about a group of 100 Bandidos members expected to travel to Odessa, Texas for the purpose of starting a gang war with the Cossacks MC.

On April 7, 2015, the FBI's San Antonio headquarters were alerted to be on the lookout for potential conflicts between the Bandidos Motorcycle Club and Cossacks Motorcycle Club at the biker rallies held in the towns of Amarillo, Hondo, Midland and Odessa.
