= Iron Order Motorcycle Club =

International Motorcycle club based in Indiana, U.S.

- Iron Order Motorcycle Club emblem
- Founded: July 4, 2004
- Founder: 8 founders: Mad Dog, Big Rick, Chief, Copper, Doc, Ice, Professor, Willie Ball
- Founding location: Jeffersonville, Indiana, United States
- Years active: 2004–present
- Territory: Worldwide (Approximately 244 chapters in the United States and 8 countries)
- Membership: 2000+
- Activities: Local charities

Iron Order Motorcycle Club (IOMC) is a motorcycle club that was formed on July 4, 2004, in Jeffersonville, Indiana. With a worldwide membership, the Iron Order is one of the largest and fastest growing motorcycle clubs in the world. The IOMC has charters in nearly every U.S. state and in eight countries around the world. Membership is open to all males over the age of eighteen.

== History ==
The Iron Order Motorcycle Club was founded in Jeffersonville, Indiana by eight men: Bad Dog, Big Rick, Chief, Copper, Doc, Ice, Professor and Willie Ball on Independence Day 2004. The following year the club expanded into Georgia, and by the end of 2006 several charters had been established in six additional states. Since then, the club has grown significantly and has approximately 224 charters spread across the continental United States. It has also branched out internationally with charters in eight other countries across the world to include: Aruba, Bonaire, Suriname, Canada, Curacao, England, Germany, and Puerto Rico.

According to their website, the Iron Order Motorcycle Club seeks to emulate the motorcycle clubs of the 1950s and 1960s, adopting the "non-conformist" attitudes of those early clubs. The IOMC states it is not a 1% motorcycle club, and as such does not endorse nor condone any form of criminal activity from its membership. However, both the American Motorcycle Association (AMA) and the U.S. Department of Justice (DOJ) have labeled the club as being "outlaw." The membership of the IOMC is made up of individuals from every possible background, including active and retired United States Armed Forces (military) personnel. Despite this, the club is actively monitored by the Bureau of Alcohol, Tobacco, Firearms and Explosives (ATF). In 2014, the ATF publicly released records of their recent surveillance on Outlaw Motorcycle Gangs (OMG). The Iron Order MC was named in the record regarding their significant rivalry with other OMGs and their propensity for violence.

Around this time (2014), the Iron Order MC experienced a large exodus of its members. These members, including long-standing ones, cited that there was a shift in the club from its original values. Many of these former members indicated the club began to embrace and participate in activities described as "outlaw culture." The club also began to permit felons to become members, which was a previous disqualifying factor. Former International President, Ray "Izod" Lubesky, disclosed after his separation from the club, that the Iron Order MC displayed an increase in violence. To support this claim, Lubesky revealed that the club was involved in 11 separate shootings within a 22-month period.

Additionally, certain commands and stations within the U.S. military have put restrictions on their members from joining, believing the Iron Order to be a "gang."

== Charitable actions and philanthropy ==
The Iron Order Motorcycle Club is involved with multitudes of charities, primarily at the local level within each charter's region. The organization firmly believes in giving back to the communities in which they ride.

During February 2016 in Massachusetts, the Iron Order raised over $13,000 in Greater New Bedford to support the Veteran's transition house. Additionally, members from the Fairfield and Cape Cod chapters paid for building permits and the materials to build a wheelchair ramp for a local community member who recently lost their leg.

On September 23, 2017, in Westerly, RI, the Iron Order gathered for the 5th annual Johnnycake Motorcycle Run and raised $3000 to support individuals and families in crisis within the local community.

Throughout the year and across the country, the IOMC supports their communities and individuals in need by participating in charity rides and fundraisers. IOMC chapters will often post about upcoming events on their websites.

== Incidents ==
The IOMC goes out of its way to avoid criminal activity and remains steadfast in being an independent and neutral motorcycle club. This has resulted in various verbal and physical confrontations with other clubs.

On June 5, 2013, an altercation involving the Iron Order and Los Lobos MC occurred in Cheyenne, Wyoming. The scuffle involved almost twenty people and ended with the arrests of two members of the Los Lobos MC.

On June 26, 2014, Zachariah Tipton, a member of the Black Pistons Motorcycle Club, a support club of the Outlaws Motorcycle Club, was shot and killed by Iron Order prospect Kristopher Stone in self-defense. The Florida State attorney did not charge Stone, stating that they believed his actions to be justified.

On June 7, 2014, an altercation occurred between members of the Iron Order MC and the Chosen Sons MC. No members of the Iron Order were charged; however, four members of The Chosen Sons MC were arrested and received charges. During this period the group also managed to build up a significant rivalry with the Hells Angels due to their history with law enforcement.

On February 21, 2015, a shootout occurred in Meridian, Mississippi between members of the Iron Order Motorcycle Club and members of the Pistoleros MC. Three people were injured.

On June 10, 2015, the Iron Order MC was involved in fight with the Iron Horsemen MC in Kentucky. One person was hit by a vehicle. Later that year, three more people would be shot in altercations between the Iron Order and the Bandidos Motorcycle Club.

On June 19, 2015, around 9:45pm, outside a restaurant in Lower Heidelberg Township, PA, a fight broke out between Iron Order members Wayne Ritchie and Timothy Martin and civilian Mark Groff. Groff's fiancée, Tonya Focht, got involved during which time she fell in front of a moving vehicle and is believed to have been run over by the back right wheel. The Berks District Attorney, John T Adams, stated that their investigation did not uncover enough information to file homicide charges. A subsequent civil lawsuit filed by the estate of Focht was dismissed with prejudice.

On January 30, 2016, at an event at the National Western Complex in Denver, CO, members of the Mongols Motorcycle Club and members of the Iron Order Motorcycle Club clashed, resulting in multiple injuries. Two members of the Mongols were shot, one of whom died. One member of the Iron Order, Derrick "Kong" Duran, was arrested and can be observed in possession of a firearm in video surveillance provided by the Complex. As well as being a member of the motorcycle club, Derrick Duran was an employee of the Colorado Department of Corrections. Denver District Attorney Mitchell R. Morrissey dropped the charges against Duran after it was determined that he acted in self-defense.
