= 2015 Waco shootout =

Shootout in Texas, U.S.

Coordinates: 31.4973°N 97.1510°W

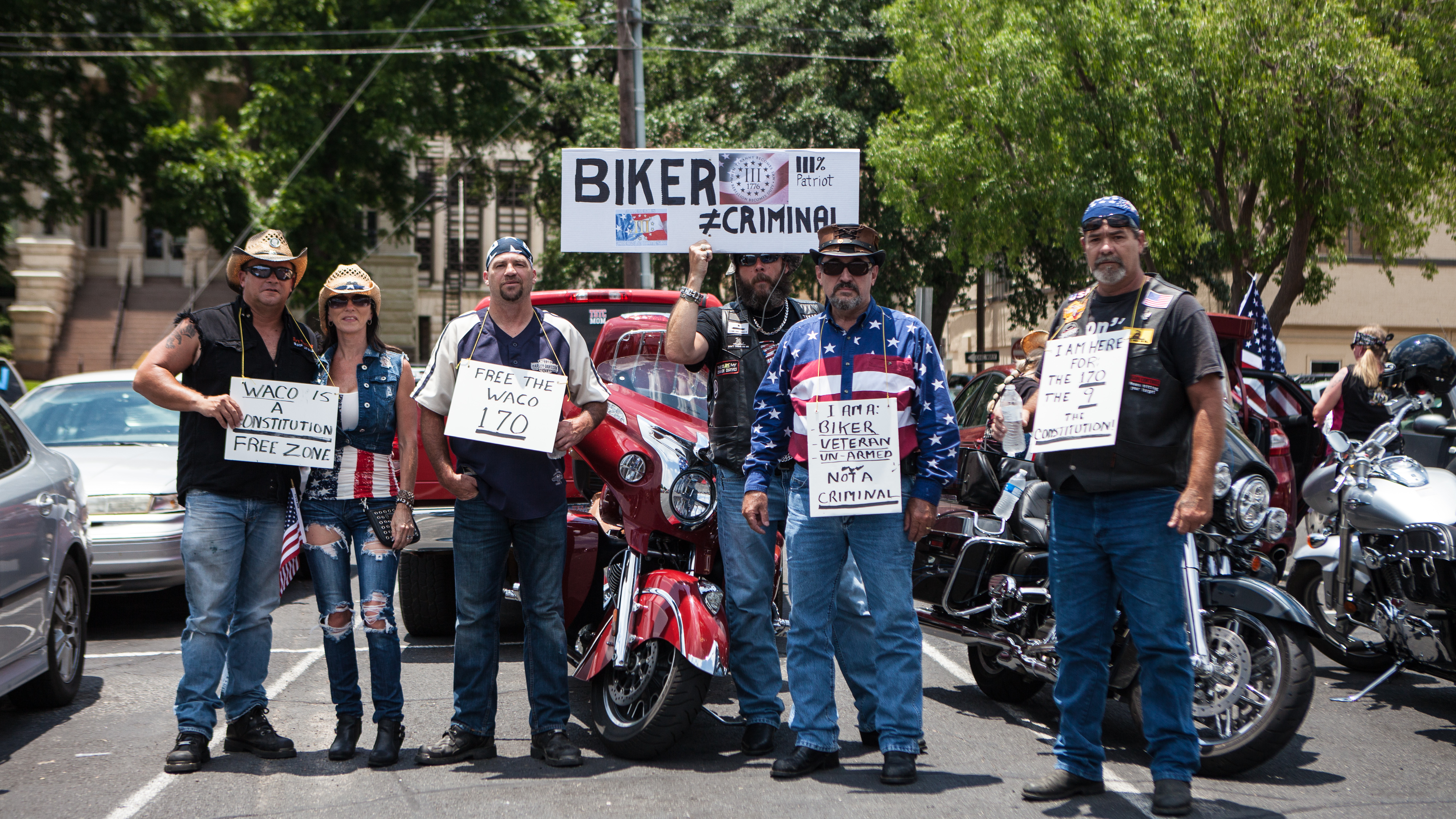
- Bikers in Waco, Texas protesting against the mass arrests and high bails
- Date: May 17, 2015; c. 12:27 p.m. CDT
- Location: Waco, Texas, U.S.
- Caused by: Gang wars involving rival motorcycle clubs
- Methods: Shootout

Parties
Bandidos Motorcycle Club	Cossacks Motorcycle Club	Waco Police Department; Texas Highway Patrol

Casualties
- Deaths: 9
- Injuries: 18
- Arrested: 177

On May 17, 2015, in Waco, Texas, United States, a shootout erupted at a Twin Peaks restaurant where more than 200 persons, including members from motorcycle clubs that included the Bandidos, Cossacks, and allies, had gathered for a meeting about political rights for motorcyclists. Law enforcement, which included 18 Waco Police Department officers and four Texas Highway Patrol troopers, had gathered to monitor the restaurant and meeting from outside, and, according to police, "returned fire after being shot at". Nine bikers were killed, 18 others wounded or injured, and 177 individuals were ultimately arrested and initially detained in connection with the shootout, most for alleged participation in organized crime. According to The New York Times, "the response by prosecutors was widely criticized as brazen overreach". According to the Waco Tribune-Herald, the shootout led to a "four-year prosecutorial fiasco that resulted in zero convictions."

== Background ==
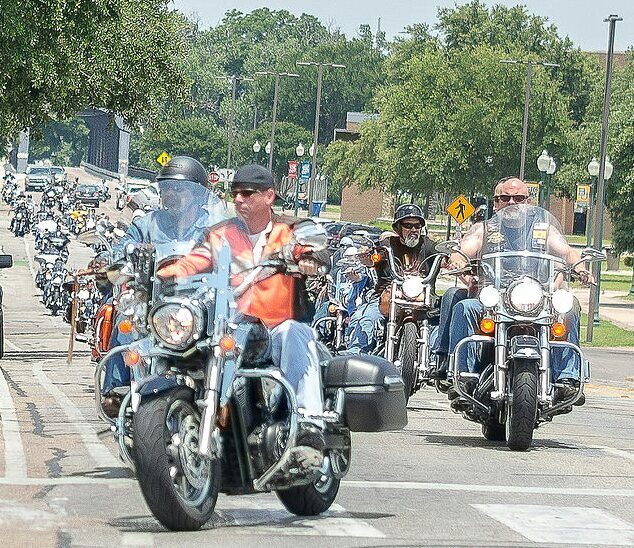
Protesting bikers in Waco, Texas

In 2014, the Texas Department of Public Safety listed the Bandidos Motorcycle Club as a "Tier 2" threat, the same rating as the Crips, Bloods, and Aryan Brotherhood, but it did not evaluate the Cossacks. That assessment said that the Bandidos Motorcycle Club "conducts their illegal activities as covertly as possible, and avoids high-profile activities such as drive-by shootings that many street gangs tend to commit."

According to Steve Cook, executive director of the Midwest Outlaw Motorcycle Gang Investigators Association, an element of the dispute had to do with the right of Texas outlaw motorcycle clubs to wear jackets decorated with distinctive patches, including a geographic bottom rocker reading "Texas", indicating Texas as the territory of the club. The dominant Bandidos claimed the right to approve all such jacket bottom rocker patches. A police affidavit released June 16 described the source of the conflict in similar terms. Following the shootout, police spokesman Patrick Swanton said a turf war between the rivals was a factor in the deadly encounter. It allegedly started following the beating of a Cossack by Bandidos at a Toys for Tots event in Decatur, Texas on December 6, 2014, and the killing of a gang member of the Ghostriders MC the following week in Fort Worth. Skirmishes over the issue continued on March 22, 2015. A police affidavit described fighting between Bandidos and Cossacks going back to November 2013, including brawls resulting in injuries, in Abilene, Palo Pinto County, and Lorena, Texas. Some of those previously injured bikers were arrested in Waco after the shootout on May 17.

On May 1, 2015, the Texas Department of Public Safety issued an advisory statement to police: "The conflict may stem from Cossacks members refusing to pay Bandidos dues for operating in Texas and for claiming Texas as their territory by wearing the Texas bottom rocker on their vests, or 'cuts.'"

The shootout erupted at a regularly scheduled regional meeting of the Texas Confederation of Clubs and Independents (COC&I), the statewide biker club coalition, involved in political issues regarding the rights of motorcyclists. Based in Tyler, Texas, the coalition engages in a broad range of activities; for example, it was honored by the city council of Jacksonville, Texas, on May 14 for its involvement in Motorcycle Safety and Awareness Month.

According to the police, most previous meetings of COC&I for that region had been held in Austin, Texas. COC&I has twelve regions, and Waco is in Region 1. The Bandidos are leading members of the COC&I while the Cossacks are not. The police affidavit claims that the Bandidos "wanted to have a show of force and make a statement that Waco was not a Cossacks' town". The police account states that, in response, the Cossacks "threatened that Waco was a 'Cossacks town' and nobody else could ride there" and they made "the decision to take a stand and attend the meeting uninvited".

Police were made aware of the meeting and had at least a dozen local officers plus state troopers positioned nearby. The restaurant had agreed to host the meeting. Officers described the restaurant management as uncooperative when confronted with concerns about the meeting. Swanton said Twin Peaks had been unhelpful in helping police officers deal with gangs in the past.

== Shootout ==
The conflict began sometime after noon, according to Waco police who had been monitoring motorcycle club activity at the Twin Peaks restaurant. Initial reports say the original conflict began, allegedly over a parking spot where "someone had their foot run over", and the fight escalated from there. At 12:24 p.m., gunfire erupted. Waco Police Sergeant W. Patrick Swanton declined to reveal details regarding how many of the dead and injured were shot by police, though he added it was possible that some of the victims had been shot by officers, stating "They started shooting at our officers and our officers returned fire." In total, nine bikers died and eighteen others were hospitalized with injuries. Later the number of injured was amended to twenty.

Swanton also related that officers invoked the "Active Shooter" protocols, which are rules of engagement newly designed and implemented to give responding law enforcement officers quicker permission to engage mass shooters with deadly force, before a command and control structure is in place. All of the fatalities, as well as the majority of those injured during the melee, suffered gunshot wounds. The shootout was the deadliest and most high-profile event in the Waco area since the Waco siege of the Branch Davidian compound in 1993.

In a June 5 bail reduction hearing, prosecutor Michael Jarrett said videotape of the shootout shows "Bandidos executing Cossacks, and Cossacks executing Bandidos". Arguing in favor of the high bonds, Jarrett said, "The facts and circumstances of this case are so extraordinary and so different from anything we have ever dealt with, we believe adequate bonds need to be in place to ensure the safety of this community."

Although all of the deaths were due to gunfire, other weapons seized after the conflict included chains, brass knuckles, knives, clubs, and batons. The knives included pocket knives, trench knives, and combat knives. A police source told CNN preliminary information indicated four of the bikers had been killed by police gunfire, but Swanton said "[t]he autopsies have not been completed and that information may very likely be incorrect". According to six witnesses interviewed by the Associated Press, three of whom were military veterans, the shootout began with a small number of pistol shots, and was then dominated by semi-automatic weapons fire. Only one semi-automatic rifle was confiscated from a biker, which was in a locked car, though other sources such as an affidavit released on June 16 suggest the presence of additional firearms among the bikers; however, the police officers at the scene were also armed with semi-automatic firearms. Swanton said the bikers fired more shots than the police did, and that it will take months to obtain ballistics reports.

Security footage shown by the Twin Peaks franchisee to the Associated Press showed one man started shooting on the patio, at which time most bikers tried to seek safety inside, first in the bathroom, and when that room filled up, the kitchen. None of those camera angles showed the parking lot.

On June 12, the Waco Police Department announced three officers fired their .223-caliber rifles a total of twelve times. It was later determined that those rounds struck four of the bikers. Forty-four spent casings were recovered at the scene, according to the police.

Vehicle forfeiture documents released June 16 include a detailed affidavit with a description of the police and prosecution's version of the events leading up to the shootout, and what they say happened at the shootout itself. The affidavit says the Cossacks arrived over an hour before the scheduled 1:00 pm meeting, and "took over the patio area, which had been reserved for the COC&I meeting." As a group of Bandidos arrived, several Cossacks and their allies approached and some pulled weapons including pistols. Bandidos member Reginald Weathers testified at a bond reduction hearing that he was part of that group of Bandidos, and that Cossacks members disrespected Dallas Bandidos president David Martinez immediately upon their arrival, arguing about a parking space. When Weathers stepped forward to defend Martinez, he says he was punched in the face, and then shot by a single bullet that passed through his arm and his chest. Since he was leaning over after being punched, he said he did not see who fired the shot. One Bandido nearly hit a Cossack with his motorcycle, and another Bandido "punched a Cossack in the face". At that point, "[s]everal Bandidos and Cossacks pulled out their weapons, including handguns, and shot and stabbed each other," and Martinez fired a .32 caliber pistol that he then placed in a parked car, according to the affidavit. Martinez was among those arrested and has since been released on bond. Police gunfire then followed.

== Casualties ==
All nine men who were killed died of gunshot wounds. According to erroneous initial police statements, eight were Cossacks and one was a Bandido.

- Daniel Raymond "Diesel" Boyett, 44, Cossack, shot in the head.
- Wayne Lee "Sidetrack" Campbell, 43, Cossack, shot in the head and torso.
- Richard Matthew "Chain" Jordan, III, 31, Cossack, shot in the head.
- Richard Vincent "Bear" Kirschner Jr., 47, Cossack, shot a total of 3 times in the knee, right thigh, and left buttock.
- Jacob Lee Rhyne, 39, Cossack, shot in the neck.
- Jesus Delgado Rodriguez, 65, unaffiliated, shot in the head and torso.
- Charles Wayne "Dog" Russell, 46, Cossack, shot in the chest.
- Manuel Issac Rodriguez, 40, Bandido, shot in the head and back.
- Matthew Mark Smith, 27, Scimitar, shot in the torso.

According to his family, Jacob Lee Rhyne, a father of two from Ranger, Texas, had joined the Cossacks six months prior and didn't own a gun. His girlfriend said, "I cannot see Jake going there if he knew there was going to be trouble. Our kids were too important."

Jesus Rodriguez's son said the Vietnam War Marine Corps veteran and father of seven from New Braunfels, Texas, was "in the wrong place at the wrong time" and didn't carry weapons. He used to carry a pocketknife, but stopped after being told he couldn't bring it into a convention. He was an associate of the Bandidos, but not a patched-in member. Rodriguez received a Navy Commendation Medal for his service in Vietnam, and a Purple Heart for wounds sustained during it.

Daniel Boyett, the only Waco resident to die, owned and ran a trucking company with his third wife.

Manuel Rodriguez was a married Bandido, nicknamed "Bandido Candyman".

As of May 19, seven of the injured remained in a hospital, in stable condition. According to attorney Seth Sutton, who negotiated the first bail, four of the arrested complained to his office that they were jailed before bullet fragments could be removed from their bodies.

== Witness accounts ==
Witnesses who came forth following the event made these statements:

- Witness William English, a former U.S. Marine and Iraq War veteran, reported the firing of small caliber rounds, followed by "a rapid succession of shots from what sounded to me like an assault rifle"; Steve Cochran, a Navy veteran and Sons of the South club member reported to CBS News that he heard one pistol shot, and the rest of the shots came from suppressed assault weapons.
- Former U.S. Marine Michael Devoll of Fort Worth, a biker arrested and held for three weeks, claimed that a large amount of rifle fire came from the police, and that he thought the police were firing randomly into the crowd.
- Former U.S. Army and Coast Guard officer Ron Blackett reported to CBS News that he heard pistol shots which were followed by shots from assault rifles.
- Waco Police spokesman Sgt. W. Patrick Swanton told CBS the witnesses' claims are "completely incorrect" and asserted the police shot less than the bikers.

== Police investigation ==
Spokesman Patrick Swanton said police recovered about 320 weapons from the crime scene. Swiss Army knives, pocket knives, handguns, and a Kalashnikov rifle were among the weapons found. 192 people were initially arrested in connection with the shootout, with 171 of those charged with participation in organized crime. They were booked at the McLennan County Jail. Per that inmate list, as of May 19, 171 people were arrested under arrest case WPD-15-9146, charged with engaging in organized criminal activity. Of them, 124 were white males, 41 were Hispanic males, three were white females, two were black males, and one was a Native American female. One hundred six people were indicted by a grand jury in connection with the shootout.

All suspects had their bonds set at $1 million by Justice of the Peace W.H. "Pete" Peterson, who said it sent a strong message: "We had nine people killed in our community. These people just came in, and most of them were from out of town. Very few of them were from in town." On May 19, three suspects were released after their bonds were mistakenly set at $20,000 and $50,000. McLennan County Judge Ralph Strother issued a warrant to have them rearrested and their bond reset to $2 million. All three arranged to turn themselves in that day. Strother also ruled that no suspect's bond can be reduced without his approval. Judge Matt Johnson made a similar ruling. The first reduction hearing was in June in Strother's court, where 59-year-old Caldwell mechanic Jimmy Don Smith was represented by Bryan lawyer Dan Jones.

Police officers reported receiving several threats after the shooting, which they are investigating. A former Bandidos leader and several experts on outlaw motorcycle clubs questioned whether the reported threats against police were genuine.

On May 22, fifty-year-old factory worker and Bandido Jeff Battey posted bail. The cash amount wasn't disclosed, but is typically 10% in Texas, or $100,000. Afterward, his lawyer and prosecutors argued over whether this meant he could leave jail. He ultimately did, after the district attorney and two district judges negotiated special restrictions for him and any future bailee from this case, including ankle monitoring, surrendering of passports, abstention from drugs and alcohol and no contact with club members or potential victims or witnesses. One other suspect was subsequently bailed out later that day, according to McLennan County Recovery Healthcare Corporation Office Manager Ronnie Marroquin, who attaches the ankle monitors.

One of the arrested, Martin Lewis, is a retired veteran detective of 32 years from the San Antonio Police Department. At the time, he was a school bus driver. He was consequently fired by the Northside Independent School District.

As of May 24, 75 suspects had requested a public defender qualified to work first-degree felony charges, of which McLennan County has 29. To make up the rest, Judge Matt Johnson has for the first time called in defenders from nearby counties, including Dallas, Bell, Williamson, Travis, Hill, Coryell, Limestone and Johnson. The district has 26 prosecutors to split the caseload among, and can enlist others from the county, state or federal levels, if needed.

One of the arrested, Kenneth Carlisle of San Antonio, had just pulled into the parking lot when he was arrested in his wife's car and charged with engaging in organized crime, according to his wife. She says he wasn't wearing any sort of biker clothing, and was just in the wrong place at the wrong time. She called the ordeal of running her two-child household while working with lawyers to negotiate a lower bond for a husband she has only been allowed to visit by phone "the worst nightmare of my life", and says she's aware of eight other arrested with similar stories.

The last arrested biker to be released from jail was Marcus Pilkington on October 30, over five months after the shootings. No one had yet been charged with murder or any other additional charges.

== Aftermath ==
Waco police sergeant Patrick Swanton said that the management of the Waco Twin Peaks had been unhelpful in dealing with bikers in the past. On May 18, Twin Peaks announced it had canceled the Waco restaurant's franchise because the management there "chose to ignore the warnings and advice from both the police and our company, and did not uphold the high security standards we have in place to ensure everyone is safe at our restaurants." Later that day, Twin Peaks spokeswoman Meghan Hecke announced that the Waco location would not reopen. She said discussions are underway on the future of another Twin Peaks in Harker Heights, owned by the same "relatively new" franchisee, Peakstastic Beverages, LLC. That company released a statement denying it was advised by police or Twin Peaks against holding the event, and contending that the violence began in the parking lot, rather than in the building. It expressed disappointment in Twin Peaks' decision to terminate the franchise before many facts were known, and pledged to assist the ongoing investigation.

Owners of the nearby Don Carlos Mexican Restaurant filed suit against Peakstastic Beverages and Twin Peaks on May 21, alleging financial damages incurred when its uninvolved restaurant was labeled a crime scene and forced to close until May 21, as the result of gross negligence by Twin Peaks. It accuses the franchisee of creating "an extreme degree of risk considering the probability and magnitude of the potential harm to others" by hosting the event, and the franchiser of regularly encouraging franchisees to host such events.

About 135 motorcycles and 80 cars and pickup trucks from the crime scene were seized through civil forfeiture law and may be auctioned off by the county, regardless of whether or not their owners are convicted.

Juan Garcia, an engineer for the City of Austin since 2009 and one of the men mistakenly released on lessened bail, was placed on paid administrative leave, pending the legal outcome and the city's own internal review. Garcia and three other bikers filed a lawsuit for damages alleging wrongfully arrest against Twin Peaks, the City of Waco, and McLennan County. The suit seeks $1 billion in damages.

== Criticism of Waco police ==
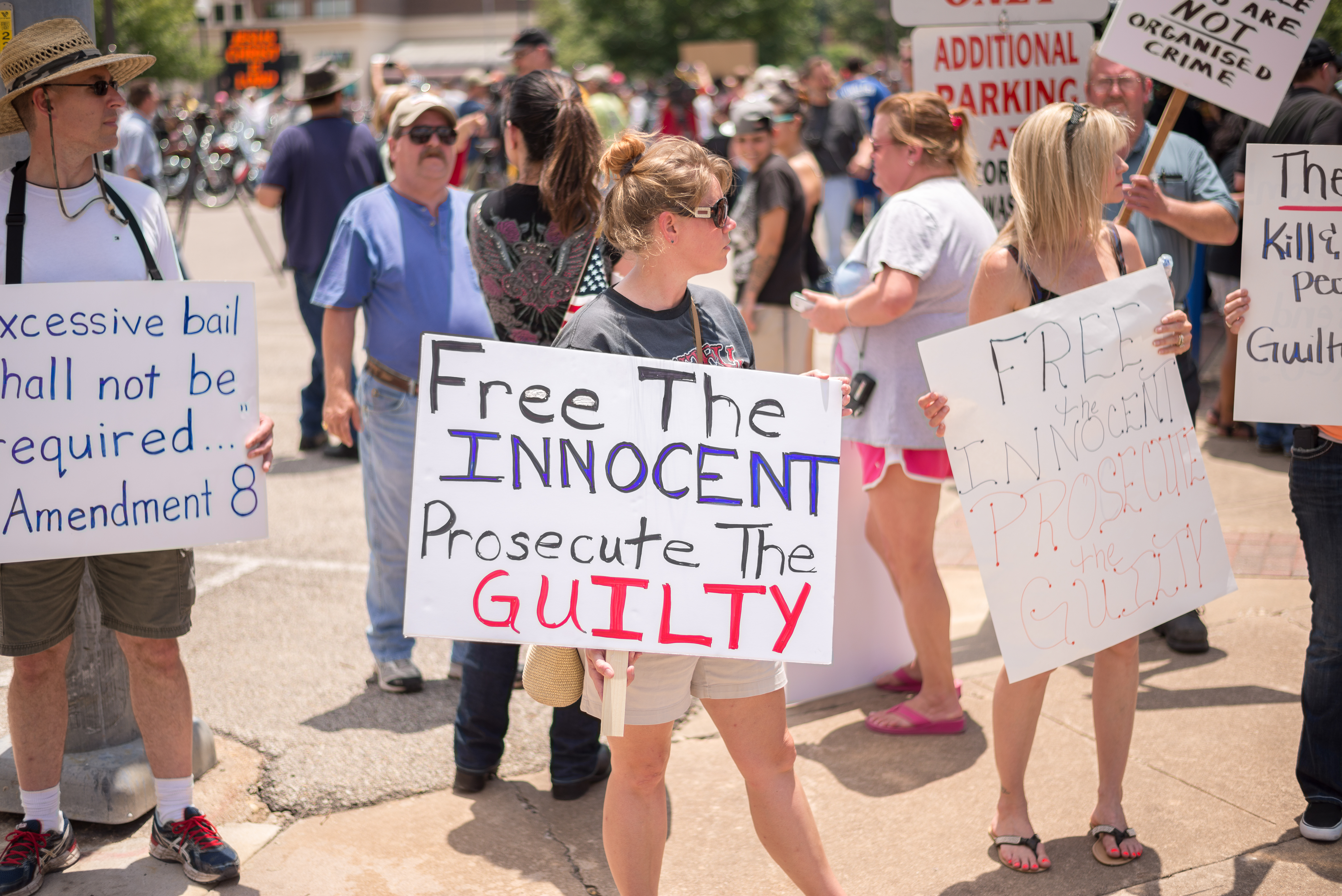
Protesters in Waco

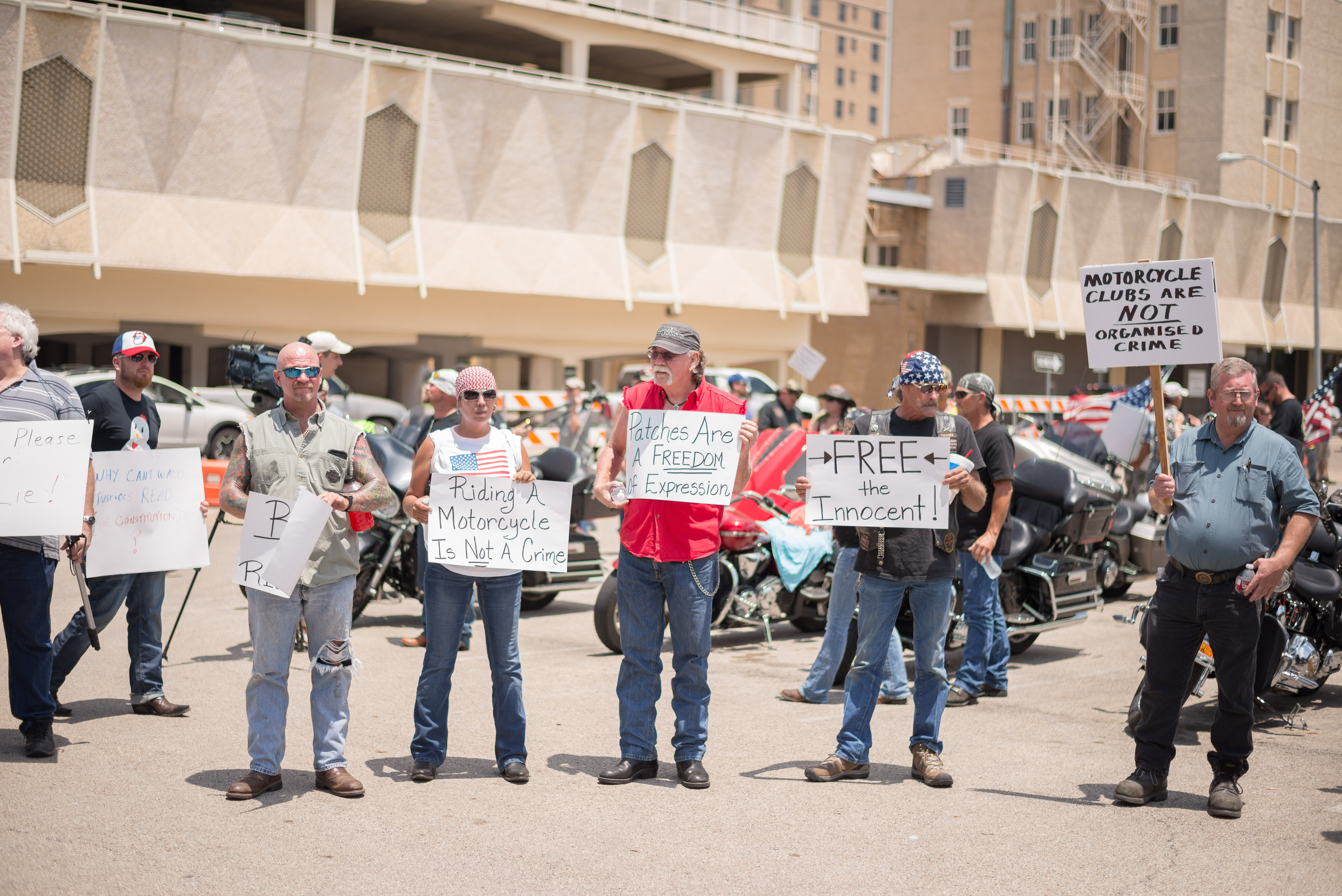
June 7 protest rally in Waco

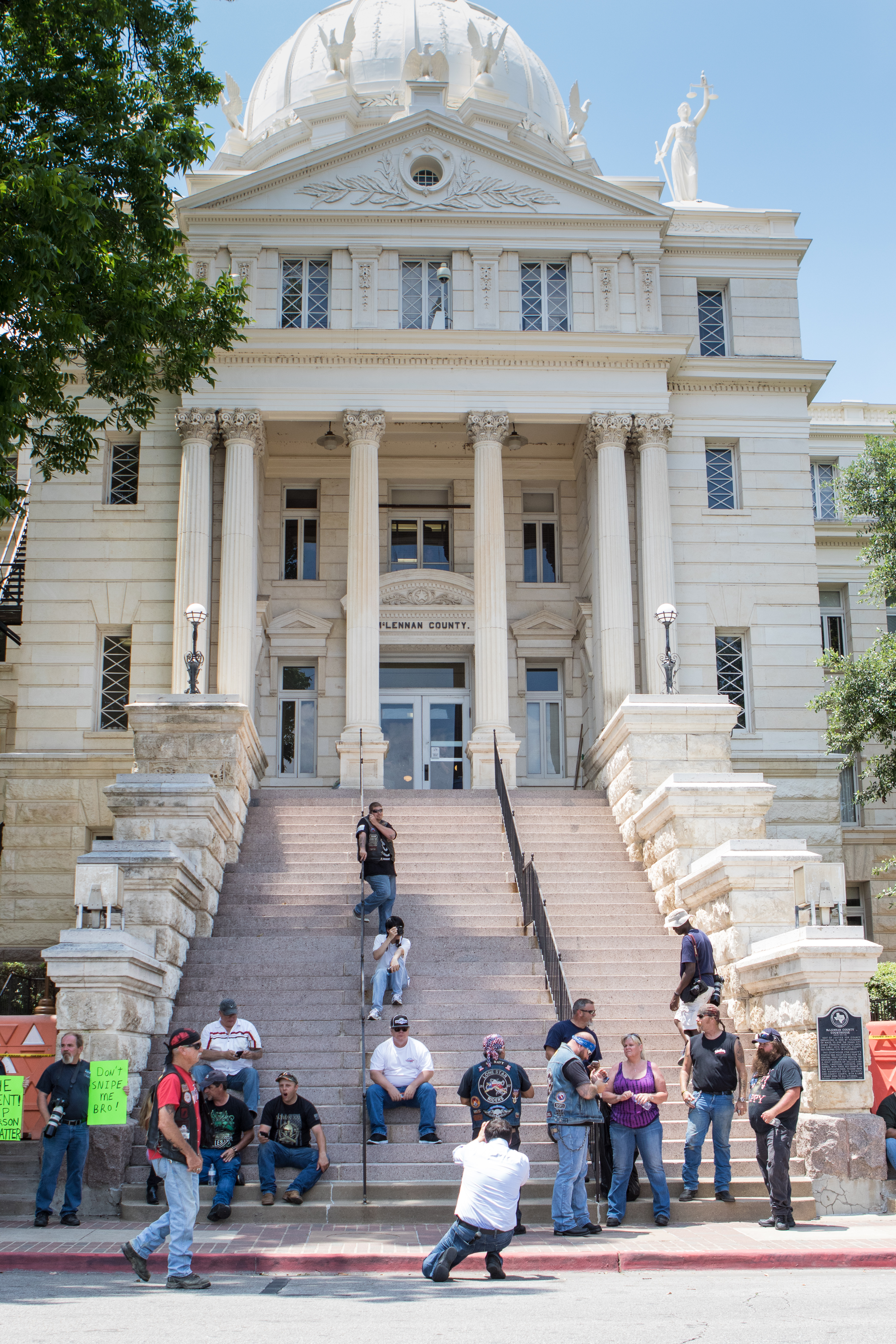
Protesters on the steps of the McLennan County Courthouse on June 7

On May 29, Clinton Broden, an attorney with Broden & Mickelsen representing arrested biker Matthew Alan Clendennen, filed a lawsuit in U.S. Federal district court claiming that his client was innocent of all charges and was held on a "fill in the name" warrant without any individual probable cause. The lawsuit was filed against the City of Waco, Texas and McLennan County as defendants, and also one named and 20 unnamed police officers as well as the McLennan County District Attorney, Abelino Reyna, and five unnamed assistant district attorneys. Clendennen is a graduate of Baylor University, a small business owner and has no previous criminal record. He was bailed after posting $100,000. He is member of the Scimitars Motorcycle Club.

Two and a half weeks after the shootout, over 140 of those arrested were still being held on $1 million bail. Law school professor and civil rights lawyer David Kairys characterized the attitude of police as "Let’s arrest them all and sort it out later," comparing the arrests to the Red Scare mass arrests of socialists and communists after World War I and the period of McCarthyism in the early 1950s. According to Kairys, such arrests may have a "chilling effect" on freedom of association and freedom of speech.

Waco police tried to prevent the release of standard information about the shootout, particularly pertaining to arresting officers. The city attorney of Waco requested that the attorney general of Texas give them the power to withhold the public records from the news media. Bill Aleshire, an attorney in Austin, Texas, criticized Waco officials for violating "bedrock open government law."

By early June, criticism of the lack of accurate information about the incident was increasing in the national news media. Conor Friedersdorf, a reporter for The Atlantic, described the incarceration of 160 people on $1 million bonds as "self-evidently excessive", and pointed out that the information lacking included "how many of the dead bikers were shot by police officers, how many cops fired their weapons, or how many total rounds they discharged." A reporter for the Houston Press described the response of Waco authorities as "a textbook example of how not to handle an emergency situation".

In response to 37 complaints of inadequate health care, inedible food, degrading treatment, and sanitation issues in the jail, the Texas Commission on Jail Standards conducted a surprise inspection on June 4. The inspector found all conditions met the minimum state standards. Houston lawyer Paul Looney, representing two men who did not file complaints, said both lost almost twenty pounds by avoiding food that had bugs on it or otherwise appeared unsafe.

On June 7, over 500 bikers gathered outside the McLennan County Courthouse to protest the mass incarcerations with about 124 bikers remaining in jail at that time. One protester, Dot Green, commented, "Only an idiot would believe that 176 hardcore criminals all showed up at a restaurant to start a big fight with the cops, and that they all deserve 1 million dollar bails."

On June 10, The New York Times observed that bond-reduction hearings are "routine proceedings that are typically heard within seven to 10 days of an arrest." Paul Looney, an attorney for three of the defendants said, "It's the most un-American activity I've seen on American soil."

On June 22, Stephen Stubbs, an attorney for the Bandidos, issued a statement accusing the police of spreading misinformation, and demanding the immediate release of all videos of the shootout, as well as the autopsy reports. Stubbs said the violence "was senseless, completely unnecessary, and wrong." He stated that weapons in possession of the Bandidos were "legally owned and carried" and that the Bandidos "were not aggressors, did not start the altercation, did not strike first, were not the first to pull weapons, and were not the first to use weapons." Stubbs added that "all involvement in the altercation by members of the Bandidos was in self-defense."

Also on June 22, attorneys for Matt Clendennen, a member of the Scimitars Motorcycle Club, served Twin Peaks with a subpoena to produce their copy of the surveillance video of the events. The City of Waco moved to quash the subpoena. However, according to Clendennen's attorney, the city did not have standing to do so and only Twin Peaks, the recipient of the subpoena, could move to quash. On June 30, a Waco state district judge denied the city's motion to quash, requiring Twin Peaks to turn over the footage, but he barred the release of the video to the public. At the request of prosecutors, the judge also placed a gag order on the Clendennen case, prohibiting police, attorneys, and witnesses from discussing the case publicly. Clendennen's attorneys filed an emergency appeal of the gag order the next day.

On September 14, 2016, three Waco police officers were cleared of wrongdoing in the shootout by a grand jury. A McLennan county grand jury reviewed the cases and chose not to charge Waco officers Andy O'Neal, Michael Bucher and Heath Jackson.

== Indictments ==
On November 10, 2015, a Waco grand jury indicted 106 people on felony charges of "engaging in organized criminal activity". Although a gag order was only imposed for attorneys involved in the Clendennen case, District Attorney Abel Reyna was "openly discuss[ing] the indictments after the grand jury action". Five defense attorneys representing arrested bikers issued statements criticizing the "cookie cutter" nature of the indictments, and Reyna's press conference. The Houston Chronicle pointed out that six months had passed since the shootings, and that law enforcement had not yet said who specifically was responsible for the shootings, or whether any of those killed or wounded had been hit by police gunfire.

On May 9, 2018, prosecutors filed murder charges against three of the bikers and more than 20 others were re-indicted, this time on new charges.

== Trial, lack of convictions, and dismissal of charges ==
The only one of the arrested bikers to be tried was Jake Carrizal, president of the Dallas chapter of the Bandidos motorcycle club. His trial ended in a mistrial on November 10, 2017.

As of February 28, 2018, 58 of the 154 bikers indicted had had their cases either dismissed or not prosecuted.

In March 2018, charges against Cody Ledbetter, a member of the Cossack motorcycle club, were dismissed. The McLennan County District Attorney had distributed sexually explicit pictures of Ledbetter and his wife, which had been on Ledbetter's cell phone, to attorneys for the 177 defendants. On March 28, 2018, a judge ordered the district attorney to stop distributing the photos.

On April 27, 2018, a special prosecutor sought to dismiss all charges against defendant Matthew Clendennen, citing lack of evidence. During a conference regarding the rest of the defendants, the District Attorney's office said that they would likely dismiss most of the other cases, save for about 30.

As of January 2019, about 26 of the original 155 bikers remain indicted. Their trials were postponed for several months to allow new district attorney Barry Johnson time to review them and decide how to proceed. On April 2, 2019, all of the remaining criminal cases were dismissed.

In 2019, over 130 civil rights lawsuits by the bikers were pending against the former DA, the former Police Chief, city of Waco, McLennan County, and local and state officers involved in the mass arrest.

== See also ==
- Nordic Biker War
- Milperra massacre
- National Western Complex shootout
- Quebec Biker War
- River Run riot
- 2023 Trabuco Canyon shooting of Bandidos
- 2006 Bandidos massacre of Ontario, Shedden
- List of mass shootings in the United States in 2023
- List of shootings in Texas
