= Alex Vella =

Maltese boxer and biker

- Born: Alessio Emmanuel Vella; 5 June 1953 (age 73); Crown Colony of Malta
- Other names: Alex, Maltese Falcon
- Occupations: Biker, lightweight boxer
- Known for: Former national president of the Rebels MC, founder of the Sydney chapter
- Spouse: Heather Vella
- Children: Adam Vella
- Website: alexvella.com.au

Alessio Emmanuel Vella (born 5 June 1953), or Maltese Falcon, is a Maltese businessman, former boxer and the former national president of the Rebels Motorcycle Club in Australia. Despite having lived in Australia since the 1960s, he is not a citizen of the country. This caused visa problems when he tried to return to Australia after having gone to Japan with his son Adam (also a boxer) for a boxing match in 2007. The New South Wales Police Force tried to bar Vella from re-entering Australia then, but he was eventually allowed to return. In 2014 Vella visited his friends and family in Malta, and while he was there, his residency visa was cancelled by the Australian Minister for Immigration and Border Protection. Vella tried to appeal in the High Court of Australia in October 2015, but was not permitted to.

== Private life ==
Vella was born into a strict Catholic family in Malta and was one of eleven children. His parents lived in a small villa near Buskett. He began work at the age of eight, carrying buckets of water on a building site for 30 cents a day, and is functionally illiterate. He and his family then moved to Australia in the 1960s and established a strawberry farm near Horsley Park, New South Wales. In his 20s, he sometimes worked two or three jobs at a time; as a bouncer, labourer and bricklayer. He also joined the Rebels Motorcycle Club while pursuing a promising career as a boxer; he eventually became the Maltese light-heavyweight champion. After a serious road accident, he received A$225,000 in compensation and used this money to set up a business importing and selling motorcycles.

== Legal issues ==
In 1990, police found a $15,000 stash of marijuana while searching his home, which they believed to be a methamphetamine factory. He was sentenced to 18 months of two-nights-a-week prison, and two-days-a-week community service. He has also been arrested, but not convicted, of a number of other crimes including stabbing two men and assaulting a woman. He was freed on appeal after being given six months in jail for the latter.

On 28 May 2008, Vella won a court case against the ANZ Bank. He sued them for $2.7 million after his former business partner, Tony Caradonna, re-mortgaged three properties, including the Rebels' clubhouse, for $2.4 million by falsifying Vella's signature. He also claimed $300,000 was fraudulently withdrawn from their joint bank account.

On 16 June 2014, Immigration Minister Scott Morrison cancelled Vella's residency visa on character grounds while Vella was visiting Malta. Vella attempted to challenge the action in the High Court of Australia, but on 16 October 2015 the court refused his application for leave to appeal.
