= Coffin Cheaters =

International outlaw motorcycle club

Coffin Cheaters Motorcycle Club
- Founded: 1970; 56 years ago
- Founded at: Perth, Australia
- Type: Outlaw motorcycle club
- Region served: Australia, Norway, Germany
- Website: www.coffincheatersmc.org

The Coffin Cheaters are an international outlaw motorcycle club that was formed in Perth, Western Australia, in 1970. The Perth-based Coffin Cheaters amalgamated in 1999 with a previously unrelated club in Victoria called Coffin Cheaters, and later "patched over" two Norwegian gangs, Forbidden Few MC and Wizard MC, in 2004 and 2005 respectively. The Coffin Cheaters were the first Australian gang to expand internationally.

An unrelated US club, Coffin Cheaters MC, founded in the early 1960s in southern California has no connection to the Australian club. City Crew Mc is a feeder club . The US club is also unusual in not having "prospects" or probationary members and normally allows only blood relatives of existing members to join.

== Four Club Policy and the Mongrel Mob conflict ==
In the 1980s Western Australia was home to four outlaw motorcycle clubs, Club Deroes, Gypsy Jokers, Gods Garbage and the Coffin Cheaters. All bar the Gypsy Jokers originated in WA. In 1989 these four gangs combined forces to violently eject the New Zealand-based street gang, the Mongrel Mob which was attempting to establish itself in Perth.

Events escalated over a five-day period where Selwyn Wharepapa, one of the leaders of the Perth Mongrel Mob, was injured in the bombing of the Mongrel Mob's metalwork shop with two kilograms of gelignite and the Mongrel Mob retaliated with attempted explosion at a tattoo shop linked with the Gypsy Jokers.

The following night police raided three homes, arresting seven people, including Wharepapa in possession of firearms, baseball bats and drugs.

Two days later, Wharepapa was shot in the groin in the Perth suburb of Swan View. Gypsy Joker Paul Hugo and Gods Garbage member Ronald Scott were arrested and charged with assault occasioning actual bodily harm. It was enough to finally force the Mongrel Mob to leave Perth.

== See also ==
- List of outlaw motorcycle clubs
- List of Outlaw Biker Conflicts
- Criminal Law (Criminal Organisations Disruption) Amendment Act 2013
