= Mongols Motorcycle Club =

International outlaw motorcycle club

Mongols MC
- Abbreviation: MMC; Mongol Nation; Mongol Brotherhood
- Founded: December 5, 1969; 56 years ago
- Founded at: Montebello, California, U.S.
- Type: Outlaw motorcycle club
- Headquarters: West Covina, California, U.S.
- Region served: Worldwide (chapters in 15 countries)
- Members: 3,000
- Website: https://mongolnation.com/

The Mongols Motorcycle Club, also known as the Mongol Brotherhood or Mongol Nation, is an international outlaw motorcycle club. Originally formed in Montebello, California, in 1969, the club is headquartered in Southern California. Although the Mongols' main presence lies in California, they also have chapters nationwide in 19 states and internationally in over 30 countries. Law enforcement officials estimate approximately 5,000 "full-patched" members are in the club. The Mongols are the 3rd -largest outlaw biker club in the world, after the Hells Angels and the Outlaws.

The Mongols are designated an organized crime group by the United States Department of Justice, the Australian Federal Police, and Europol.

== History ==
The Mongols Motorcycle Club was formed in Montebello, California on December 5, 1969. The club had ten founding members, the majority of whom were Vietnam veterans. The first national president of the Mongols, Louis Costello, named the club in honor of Genghis Khan and the Mongol Empire. The Mongols' original sergeant-at-arms, Alfonso "Big Al" Aceves, served three tours of duty in Vietnam with the 101st Airborne Division. The club's founders were reportedly a group of Hispanic bikers from East Los Angeles who formed the Mongols as an alternative to the Hells Angels, which did not allow non-White members at the time. The Mongols voted to become an "outlaw" club in 1974. The Mongols' membership increased as the club began recruiting inmates, particularly from the California Men's Colony in San Luis Obispo. Within ten years of its foundation, the club had established chapters in Los Angeles, the San Gabriel Valley, the San Fernando Valley, Long Beach, San Diego and Bakersfield.

The Mongols became involved in a long-term feud with the Hells Angels beginning in 1977. The Hells Angels ceded control of much of Southern California to the Mongols during the 1980s on the condition that the Angels would in turn hold rights over Northern California.

In 2000, the Mongols had a membership of around 200, with 21 chapters across the United States. By 2019, the club had expanded across the U.S. and into a dozen countries internationally.

== Insignia ==
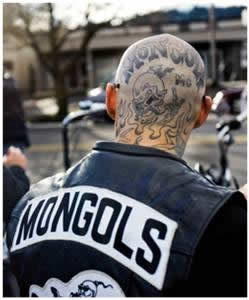
A Mongols member sporting club "colors" and tattoos.

The Mongols' insignia depicts a caricature of a Mongol warrior – reported to be Genghis Khan – sporting a topknot, bell-bottoms and sunglasses, and riding a motorcycle. This image is trademarked and registered with the United States Patent and Trademark Office. The Mongols' logo, along with additional patches, is worn on members' "colors". Other patches worn include those which indicate a member's rank within the club, the location of the chapter to which he belongs, club slogans, and "1%" emblems. Mongols patches utilize a black-and-white color scheme. The Mongols' back patches, or "rockers", are awarded to the club's members in three steps; firstly the bottom "rocker" which indicates the location of the chapter, followed by the club logo, and finally the top "rocker", reading the name of the club and indicating full membership. According to law enforcement, a skull and crossbones patch worn by a Mongol indicates that the member has killed on behalf of the club. Additionally, a tattoo reading "RFFN" (an acronym of "respect few, fear none") is allegedly only permitted to be worn by a Mongol who has committed an act of violence against a member of the Hells Angels. Mongols members are also known to wear Las Vegas Raiders-branded clothing in order to circumvent bans on gang colors.

The club's mottos include: "Live Mongol, die Mongol" ("LMDM"); "Mongols forever, forever Mongols ("MFFM"); and "Respect few, fear none" ("RFFN"). Other names for the club include the Mongol Nation and Mongol Brotherhood. The Mongols' fight song goes as follows:

We are Mongol raiders, we're raiders of the night
We're dirty sons of bitches, we'd rather fuck and fight
Hidy, hidy, Christ Almighty, who the fuck are we?
Shit, fuck, cunt, suck, Mongols MC!

=== Bans on club logos ===
After a long legal battle with the Department of Justice and ATF over the Mongols' MC patch, the Mongols won the rights to continued use and ownership of their patch.

In a 2015 racketeering case in Los Angeles, the Federal government tried and failed to use civil forfeiture laws to seize all rights to the Mongols emblems and patches in order to forbid members from wearing them. On September 16, 2015, Federal District Judge David O. Carter dismissed the case.

In January 2019, a California jury had ruled that federal prosecutors could strip the motorcycle club of its brand. An attempt to do so was rebuffed by the Central District of California Court, concluding that the seizure of the trademark violated the First Amendment right to free expression and the Eighth Amendment protection from excessive punishment.

On 24 April 2020, a law came into effect in New Zealand banning Mongols members from wearing club insignia inside government buildings, including courts, Work and Income offices, libraries, schools, public hospitals, some sports grounds and public swimming pools. Minister of Police Stuart Nash stated: "Gang insignia is intended to intimidate the public and other gangs. It is designed to claim ownership of a physical space and to encourage the recruitment of gang prospects. We will not allow the Mongols MC to advertise its presence in this way".

== Membership and organization ==
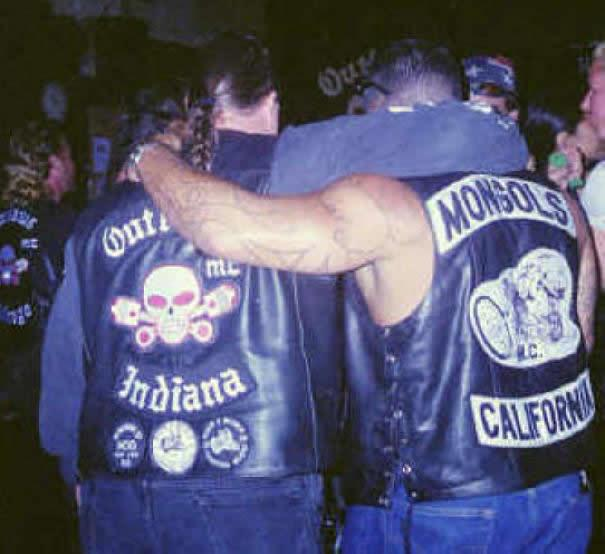
A Mongol with an Outlaws member.

Only men are permitted to join the Mongols. In the United States, the club permits Hispanic, Asian Americans, Native American and White males as members. African Americans are excluded from joining. In Australia, members are predominantly of Anglo-Celtic, Greek, Maori, and Middle Eastern descent. The Mongols in Germany recruit primarily from the Arab and Kurdish communities in the country. Prospective members are required to own a Harley-Davidson motorcycle and must serve a probationary period as a "prospect" before being initiated into the club. Mongols members are required to pay a monthly fee and attend chapter meetings. The club's bylaws are contained in a 70-page constitution, which also features a list of ten commandments. The Mongols' constitution forbids drug use and dictates that any member convicted of a serious crime faces immediate expulsion from the club.

The Mongols organization is headed by a "mother chapter", which is composed of national officers and led by a national president. The "mother chapter" exercises authority over all Mongols chapters and members, and is responsible for collecting and reviewing applications, collecting fees and resolving disputes within the club. The Mongols' international headquarters is located in Southern California, formerly based in Montebello and Commerce, and currently in West Covina. Each club chapter pays financial tribute to the "mother chapter" and is governed by an officer corps, consisting of a president, vice president, sergeant-at-arms and a secretary/treasurer. According to prosecutors, the dues collected by the "mother chapter" are used to fund and promote the club and to pay for the legal expenses of members. The club denies, however, that it covers any members' legal fees. The Mongols have an estimated membership of between 4,000 and 5,000 internationally, with chapters in over 30 countries Australia, Argentina, Belgium, Brazil, Canada, Costa Rica, Denmark, England, France, Germany, Indonesia, Ireland, Israel, Italy, Malaysia, Mexico, Mongolia, the Netherlands, New Zealand, Norway, Poland, Russia, Singapore, Spain, Sweden, Switzerland, Thailand, Hong Kong, and the United States.

The Mongols oversee the Raiders MC, an affiliated official support club.

== Criminal allegations and incidents ==
The Mongols are considered by law enforcement agencies in the United States to be among the "big five" motorcycle gangs, along with the Bandidos, the Hells Angels, the Outlaws and the Pagans. In Australia, the Mongols are included among the "big six", with the Bandidos, the Hells Angels, the Comanchero, the Finks and the Rebels.

Mongols members have a long history in the illegal drugs trade (especially methamphetamine), money laundering, robbery, extortion, firearms violations, murder, and assault, among other crimes. Current club president David Santillan denies that the club as a whole is a criminal enterprise, and attorneys for the club claim that it has changed its code of conduct to exclude drug abusers and criminals.

On March 23, 2024, a San Bernardino County Sheriff's Deputy, Christopher Bingham, was arrested and accused of being an active member of the Mongols. Bingham, a firearms expert and former gun shop owner, was riding with two club members and carrying an unregistered Glock 9mm handgun. During his arrest, he wore a T-shirt that read, “(Expletive) the 81!" referring to the Hells Angels outlaw motorcycle club. Also on the shirt were the initials “SYLM,” which stands for “Support Your Local Mongols.” Bingham also had a ring with the black letter “M”.

== See also ==
- List of outlaw motorcycle clubs
- Under and Alone by William Queen

== Bibliography ==
- Barker, Thomas (2014). Biker Gangs and Transnational Organized Crime. Oxford: Routledge. ISBN 9780323298704.
- Christie, George (2016). Exile on Front Street: My Life as a Hells Angel. New York City: Thomas Dunne Books. ISBN 9780283072666.
