= Club Deroes Motorcycle Club =

Australian outlaw motorcycle club

Club Deroes MC
- Abbreviation: CDMC
- Founded: 1971; 55 years ago
- Founded at: Perth, Western Australia
- Type: Outlaw motorcycle club
- Region served: Perth, Western Australia

The Club Deroes Motorcycle Club or Club Deroes MC are an Australian outlaw motorcycle club that was formed in Perth, Western Australia, in 1971.

== Four club policy and the Mongrel Mob conflict ==
In the 1980s Western Australia was home to four outlaw motorcycle clubs, Club Deroes, Gypsy Jokers, Gods Garbage and the Coffin Cheaters. All except the Gypsy Jokers originated in WA. In 1989 these four gangs combined forces to violently eject the New Zealand-based street gang, the Mongrel Mob, which was attempting to establish itself in Perth.

Events escalated over a five-day period where Selwyn Wharepapa, one of the leaders of the Perth Mongrel Mob, was injured in the bombing of the Mongrel Mob's metalwork shop with two kilograms of gelignite and the Mongrel Mob retaliated with an attempted explosion at a tattoo shop linked with the Gypsy Jokers.

The following night police raided three homes, arresting seven people, including Wharepapa in possession of firearms, baseball bats and drugs.

Two days later, Wharepapa was shot in the groin in the Perth suburb of Swan View. Gypsy Joker Paul Hugo and Gods Garbage member Ronald Scott were arrested and charged with assault occasioning actual bodily harm. It was enough to force the Mongrel Mob to leave Perth.

== See also ==
- List of outlaw motorcycle clubs
