= Rebels Motorcycle Club =

Australian outlaw motorcycle gang

- Founded: 1969; 57 years ago, as the Confederates, by Clint Jacks
- Founded at: Brisbane, Queensland, Australia
- Type: Outlaw motorcycle club
- Purpose: Drug trafficking, arms dealing, extortion, prostitution, money laundering, armed robbery, murder, assault, kidnapping
- Region served: Australia, Belgium, Cambodia, Canada, Costa Rica, England, Fiji, France, Germany, Greece, Indonesia, Italy, Japan, Laos, Lebanon, Malta, New Zealand, Philippines, Russia, Singapore, Spain, Sweden, Thailand, United States
- Website: www.rebelsmc.com.au

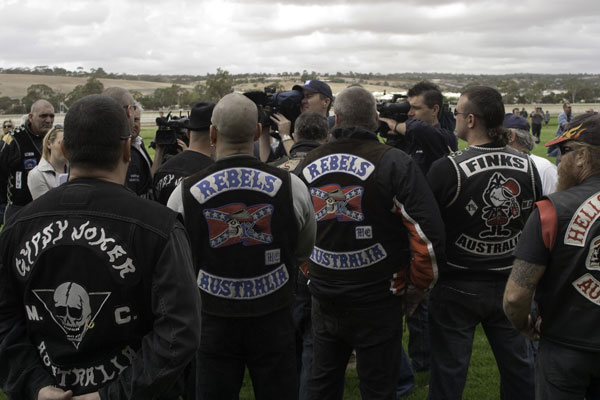

The Rebels Motorcycle Club is an outlaw motorcycle club. At its peak in Australia, it had around 70 chapters and over 1,000 members and associates nationwide, making it the largest club in the country at the time. It was founded by Clint Jacks in Brisbane, Queensland, in 1969 and was originally named the "Confederates". Their insignia is a Confederate flag with a cap-wearing skull and 1% patch in the centre. The Australian government and law enforcement consider the Rebels to be a criminal organisation, but the club claims to be a group of motorcycle enthusiasts rather than gangsters.

After the former National President, Maltese boxer Alex Vella, was stranded in Malta after a visit in 2014, it is presumed that Damien Vella, who was permitted to return to the country, took the role of National President. That being said, his visa was later cancelled and he was sent to Malta.

Its constitution states it is a non-profit organisation which promotes the riding of Harley-Davidson motorcycles. Members are only permitted to join the club once and never to join another motorcycle club.

The Rebels established their first international chapters in New Zealand in 2011.

== Criminal activities ==
In November 2000, police raided Rebels clubhouses in New South Wales, Queensland and Western Australia and seized drugs, firearms and even a crocodile. A number of people were arrested on charges relating to the items seized.

Two Rebel associates were arrested for the murder of Bandidos member Ross Brand after their clubhouse was raided, on 16 November 2008. Brand was shot dead outside the Bandidos clubhouse in Breakwater, Victoria on 22 October.

On 23 April 2009. A series of raids across Australia ended in 27 members of the Rebels being arrested on a number of charges. Drugs including methamphetamine, heroin and cocaine were seized as well as firearms, cash, stolen goods and stolen vehicles.

Edin "Boz" Smajovic, a Bosnian refugee and Rebels member, was shot dead at the Macarthur Auto Centre in Campbelltown, New South Wales. His funeral, which was held on 15 January 2009 at Auburn Gallipoli Mosque, was attended by over 300 Rebels, including National President Alex Vella. He was referred to as their 'little brother'.

On 18 May 2009, Michael Paul Falzon was sentenced to ten years in prison for the trafficking of methamphetamine, which he had been producing in Mackay, Rockhampton and Dalby and used the Rebels to transport and sell it throughout Queensland and South Australia. The drug ring operated from 1999 until 2003 and made at least $1.5 million.

=== Conflict with the Rock Machine ===
The Rebels began to be involved in a conflict, when a Rock Machine chapter was established in the Perth suburb of Myaree in 2009 by then Rock Machine MC Canada leader Critical J. The Rock Machine had arrived in Australia during 2008. At the time Sean Brown had given permission for a Nomads chapter to be formed. The defection of Rebels MC members to the Rock Machine MC sparked an ongoing violent feud between the groups, when the Rock Machine settled in Perth in 2009 there were allegations by media that a turf war broke out between the two rival motorcycle clubs, with exchanges between the two groups including firebombings, assaults and the assassination attempt in 2011 of Rebels WA president Nick Martin, who survived being shot, tensions remain ongoing.Nick Martin was shot dead in 2020.

On 14 April 2012, Anthony Perish (a Gypsy Joker Motorcycle Club member), his brother Andrew (a Rebels Motorcycle Club member) and Matthew Lawton were sentenced to eighteen, nine and fifteen years respectively imprisonment for the homicide of convicted Sydney drug trafficker Terry Falconer, as well as firearms and drug dealing offences.

== Overseas expansion ==
In January 2011, the New Zealand Police announced that the Rebels were attempting to set up a New Zealand chapter, and that this was not welcome. New Zealand has reportedly been deporting Australian Rebels members. Despite this, many members wearing Rebel's patches have been spotted throughout the North Island of New Zealand, and it is believed they now have a permanent presence in the country.

== See also ==
- List of outlaw motorcycle clubs
- Criminal Law (Criminal Organisations Disruption) Amendment Act 2013
