= Bandidos Motorcycle Club =

International outlaw motorcycle club

Bandidos MC
- Abbreviation: BMC; Bandido Nation
- Founded: March 4, 1966; 60 years ago
- Founder: Donald Chambers
- Founded at: San Leon, Texas, U.S.
- Type: Outlaw motorcycle club
- Headquarters: Houston, Texas, U.S.
- Region served: Worldwide (303 chapters in 22 countries)
- Members: 3,000–3,500
- Website: www.bandidosmc.com

The Bandidos Motorcycle Club, also known as the Bandido Nation, is an outlaw motorcycle club with a worldwide membership. Formed in San Leon, Texas, in 1966, the Bandidos MC is estimated to have between 3,000 and 3,500 members and 303 chapters located in 22 countries, making it the fourth-largest motorcycle club in the world behind the Hells Angels, the Outlaws, and the Pagans.

Numerous law enforcement and international intelligence agencies classify the Bandidos as an organized crime syndicate.

== History ==
The Bandidos Motorcycle Club was founded by 36-year-old dockworker Donald Eugene Chambers on March 4, 1966, in San Leon, Texas. Chambers named the club in honor of the Mexican bandits who lived by their own rules, and he recruited members from biker bars locally in Houston as well as in Corpus Christi, Galveston, and San Antonio. Like other outlaw motorcycle clubs, they call themselves "one percenters", a phrase coined by the former president of the American Motorcyclist Association who once stated that 99 percent of motorcyclists were law-abiding citizens and 1 percent "outlaws". By the early 1970s, the club had over one hundred members, including many Vietnam War veterans.

Ronald Jerome Hodge took over from Chambers as the Bandidos' president in 1972. Hodge was nicknamed "Mr. Prospect" because of the short amount of time in which he was awarded his club membership, and he later became known as "Step Mother" in deference to Chambers' moniker "Mother". Under Hodge's leadership, the Bandidos became an international motorcycle club when the first foreign chapter was established in Sydney, Australia in 1983. The Australian branch was founded by Anthony Mark Spencer, who had previously encountered Bandidos members during a visit to the United States. Hodge was sentenced to five years in prison in December 1988 for conspiring to bomb homes and automobiles belonging to members of a rival club, and he died of heart disease in 1992.

In 1989, the club was established in Europe when a chapter was formed in Marseille, France. Subsequent expansion into the Nordic countries in the 1990s led to a violent feud with the Hells Angels. The third Bandidos international president, James Edward Lang, as well as his successor, Charles Craig Johnston, were each sentenced to ten years' imprisonment on drug charges in November 1998. George Wegers, who served as international president between 1998 and 2005, was convicted of racketeering charges in October 2006.

The Bandidos embarked on a failed endeavour to establish themselves in Canada after merging with the Montreal-based Rock Machine Motorcycle Club in 2000. The Bandidos ceded Quebec to the Hells Angels at the conclusion of the province's deadliest biker war in 2003. In 2007, the Bandidos' Canadian chapters went defunct following the internal Shedden massacre.

According to the club's website, the Bandidos' Western Hemisphere chapters became autonomous from the international chapters in Europe and Australia on July 17, 2007. The American chapters began wearing a redesigned patch in 2011.

== Insignia ==
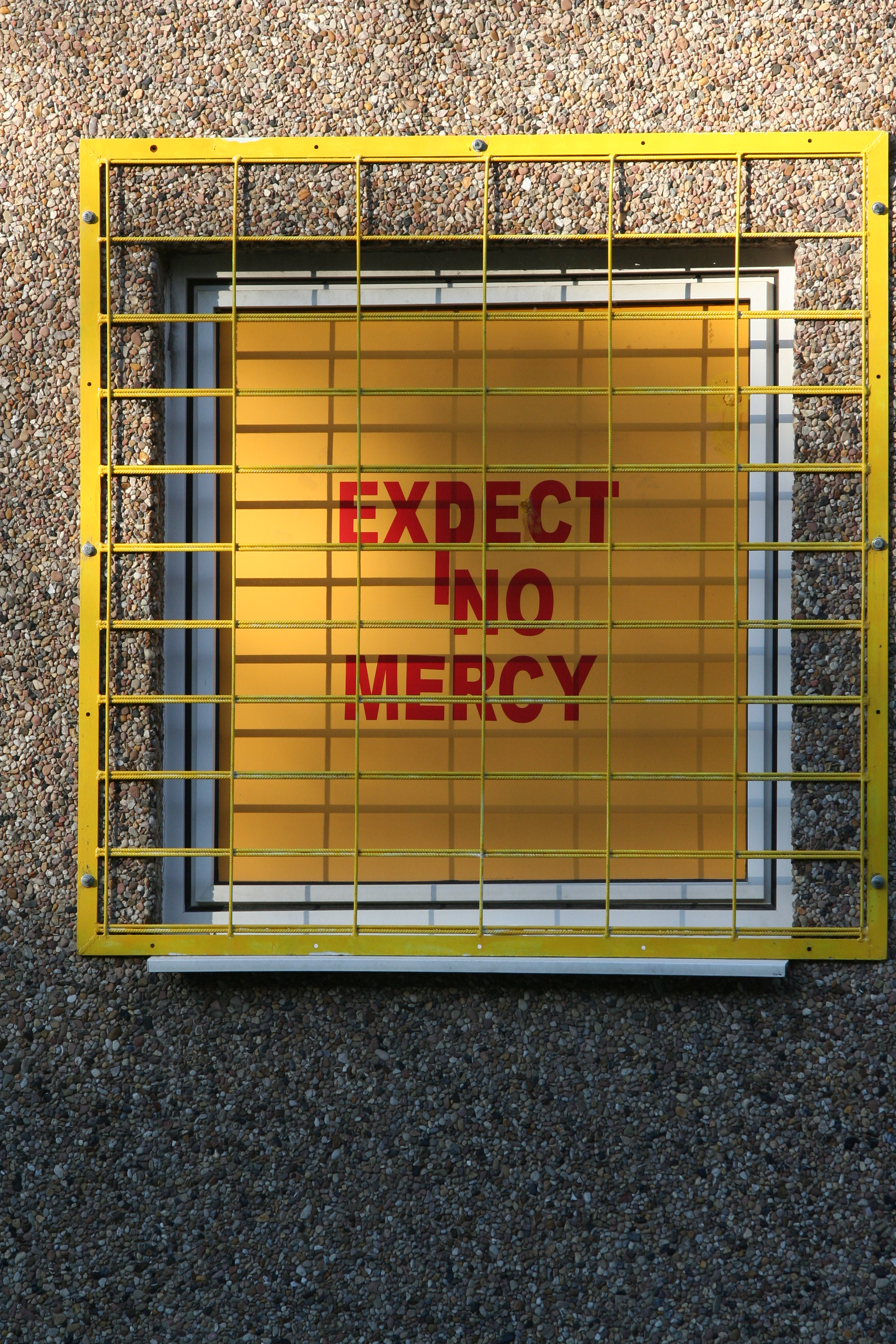
"Expect No Mercy"

The Bandidos' insignia, known as the "Fat Mexican", consists of a caricature of a Mexican bandit wearing a sombrero and holding a machete in one hand and a pistol in the other. The design is credited to the club's founder, Donald Chambers. The "Fat Mexican" bears a resemblance to the Frito Bandito – a cartoon mascot of the Fritos corn chips brand – and according to Bandidos lore, Chambers took the club's name and logo from the mascot. However, the Frito Bandito was not developed until 1967, the year after the Bandidos' foundation. In addition to the "Fat Mexican" and diamond-shaped "1%er" emblems, club members also wear other patches on leather or denim vests – known as "colors". These patches consist of red lettering displayed on a gold background. The Bandidos' color scheme was inspired by that of the United States Marine Corps and chosen by Chambers, a Marine Corps veteran of the Vietnam War. Patches denoting a member's rank and chapter are worn, as are various other patches which have specific meanings. Although the particular meaning of each patch is not publicly known, various law enforcement agencies have identified Bandidos patches which they believe are related to criminal activity. For example, police have reported that the "Expect No Mercy" patch is awarded to those who have committed murder on behalf of the club, while the "TCB" ("Taking Care of Business") patch is worn by club officers and nomads. Similar to the "Expect No Mercy" patch, the "CDG" ("Coup de Grâce") patch reportedly signifies a member who has committed a significant act of violence.

The Bandidos' mottos include "Cut one, we all bleed", "God forgives, Bandidos don't", "Our colors don't run" and "We are the people our parents warned us about". Another, more generic, saying of the club is "Bandidos forever, forever Bandidos" ("BFFB").

== Membership ==
Bandidos members must be male and own at least one Harley-Davidson motorcycle (although other American-made motorcycles can also be allowed). Prospective members must undertake a three-stage process before being initiated, beginning as a "hangaround", before becoming a "prospect" and then "probation". The length of this process is decided by each chapter president, and ends when the chapter's members vote unanimously to allow the probationary member to enter the club. A screening process is carried out to prevent infiltration by law enforcement. Upon joining the Bandidos, each member must sign their motorcycle over to the club.

Each club chapter follows a structured hierarchy, with a president, vice-president, sergeant-at-arms, road captain and secretary/treasurer. Members must abide by various by-laws, such as not wearing the club patch while riding in a car or truck, and are required to attend meetings (known as "Church") four times per month. These rules also dictate that any member who fails to attend mandatory group motorcycle rides is fined and must forfeit the title of his motorcycle. Another requirement is that Bandidos must follow the philosophy "All members are your brothers and your family", and must "not fear authority and have a general disdain for the rules of society". Any member who cooperates with law enforcement, for example, is susceptible to disciplinary action. All Bandidos regalia, including tattoos, is considered club property. Membership fees are required, and are used to cover club expenses, such as funeral costs, and contribute to a legal defense fund. Club bylaws state that any member who commits suicide will not receive a Bandidos funeral.

The Bandidos have an estimated membership of between 3,000 and 3,500 worldwide. In the United States, the majority of the club consists of white and Hispanic males.

== Organization ==
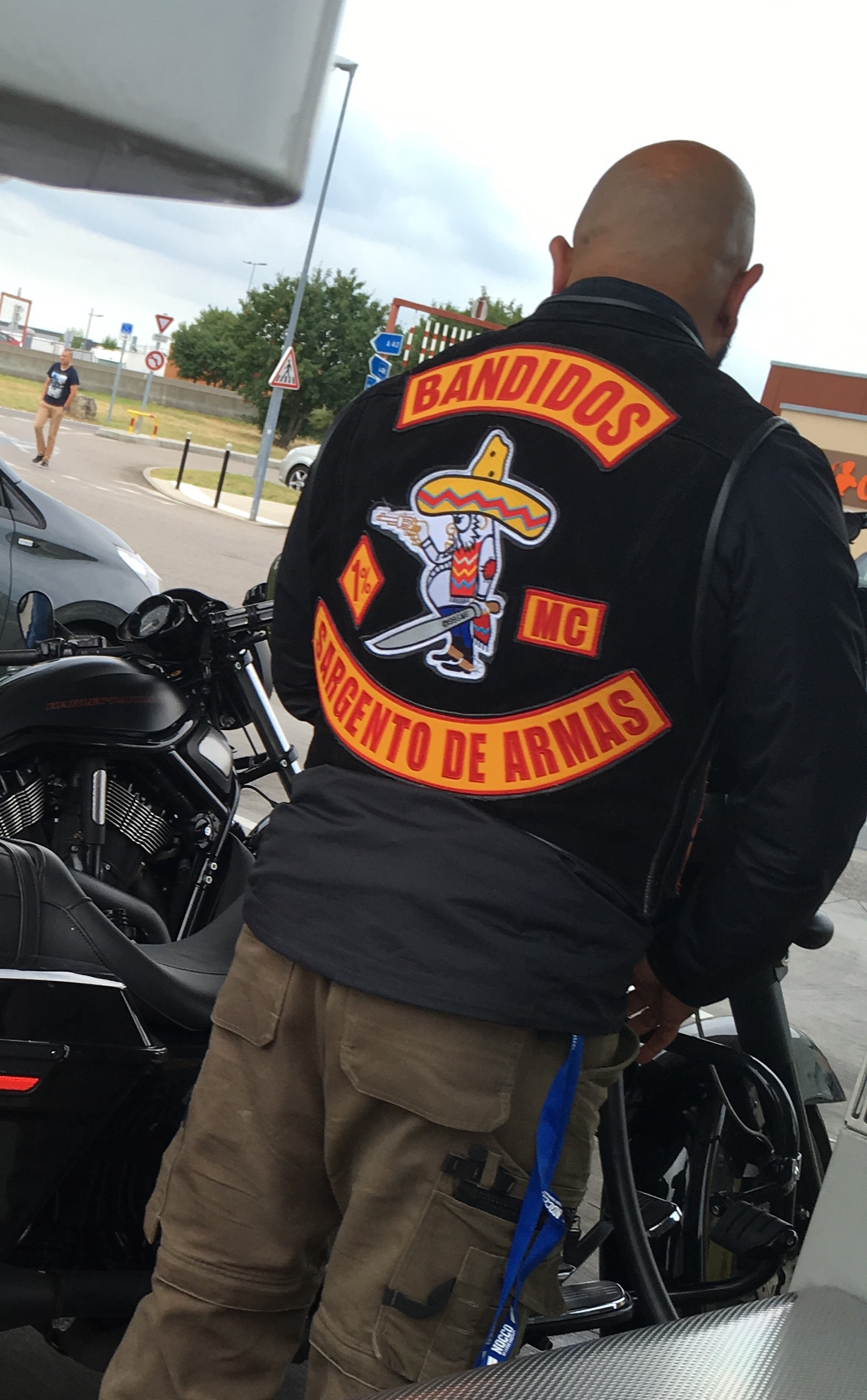
Bandidos

The Bandidos Motorcycle Club is organized by local chapters, with state and regional officers, as well as a national chapter made up of four regional vice-presidents and a national president. The leadership of the club consists of an international president, known as "El Presidente", who has authority over every club chapter. The club also has Nomad chapters, made up of members not bound by geographical location, which are responsible for security, counterintelligence and internal discipline. The Bandidos' "mother chapter" is based in Houston, Texas.

The club has 303 chapters worldwide, located in twenty-two countries in North America, Oceania, Europe and Asia.

=== North America ===
The United States is home to 93 Bandidos chapters, located in sixteen states. The club is concentrated in Texas but extends into Louisiana, Missouri, Mississippi, Alabama, Arkansas, New Mexico, Colorado, Montana, Wyoming, South Dakota, Utah, Idaho, Nevada, Washington and Oklahoma. The Bandidos incorporated in Texas as a non-profit organization in 1978. The club has subsequently incorporated in other states, including Washington and Alabama.

The Bandidos expanded into Canada following a merger with the Rock Machine Motorcycle Club in Quebec in 2000. After establishing further chapters in Ontario, Alberta and Manitoba, the club's operations in Canada ceased in November 2007 as a result of infighting, law enforcement efforts, and pulled status from the club's American leadership.

In 2004, the Bandidos formed a chapter in Costa Rica.

=== Oceania ===
The first Australian chapter was formed in 1983, in Sydney, by former members of the Comanchero Motorcycle Club. The club has since expanded substantially in Australia and there are forty-five Bandidos chapters throughout the country.

The Bandidos have a small but growing presence in New Zealand after a rocky start in 2012. They claim to have more than a dozen patched members and prospects in the Christchurch area.

=== Europe ===
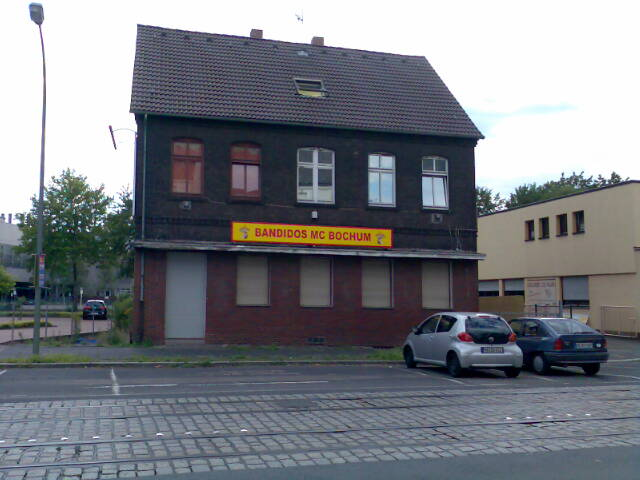
Bandidos clubhouse in Bochum, Germany.

There are approximately ninety Bandidos chapters in Europe. The first European chapter opened in Marseille in France in 1989. This was followed by expansion into the Nordic countries, with branches being established in Denmark in 1993, Sweden in 1994, and Finland and Norway in 1995.

The German department of the Bandidos was chartered in 2000. Chapters were then founded in Italy in 2001 and on the Channel Islands in 2003.

The Bandidos formed its first chapter in the Netherlands in 2014. The club was prohibited in the country in 2017, however.

In recent years the club has also expanded heavily into Spain, Belgium, Estonia, Greece, England and Ireland. Additionally, it is reportedly considering establishing a presence in Russia and Eastern Europe.

=== Asia ===
In 2001, the Bandidos were established in Thailand via a merger with the Diablos Motorcycle Club in Pattaya. The club further expanded to Malaysia and Singapore in 2006.

=== Support clubs ===
Like other major motorcycle clubs, the Bandidos also have a number of "support" clubs. These groups usually wear reverse colors (gold border with red background rather than the Bandidos' red-border–and–gold background). They also commonly wear a unique patch (known as the "Heart Patch") consisting of a round patch in Bandidos colors on the front upper left of the colors (vest), as worn by the member. Most of these clubs are regional.

== Criminal allegations and incidents ==
The United States Department of Justice, the Criminal Intelligence Service Canada, Europol and the Australian Federal Police consider the Bandidos to be a criminal organization. Law enforcement agencies in the United States also identify the Bandidos as one of the "big four" motorcycle gangs, along with the Hells Angels, the Outlaws and the Pagans, and contend that the club is responsible for organized crime activity such as drug dealing, arms trafficking, prostitution, extortion, money laundering and murder. In Australia, the Bandidos are included among the "big six", with the Hells Angels, the Comanchero, the Finks, the Mongols and the Rebels.

While individual chapters had previously been banned in Germany, the Netherlands became the first country to prohibit the club as a whole in December 2017 when a court in Utrecht outlawed both the Dutch department of the Bandidos and the international organization on the grounds that the club forms a threat to public order.

== See also ==
- List of outlaw motorcycle clubs

== Bibliography ==
- Edwards, Peter (2010). The Bandido Massacre; A True Story of Bikers, Brotherhood and Betrayal. HarperCollins Publishers Ltd. ISBN 978-1-55468-044-3.
- Coulthart, Ross; McNab, Duncan (2008). Dead Man Running: An Insider's Story on One of the World's Most Feared Outlaw Motorcycle Gangs, the Bandidos. Allen & Unwin. ISBN 978-1-74175-463-6.
