= Bandidos MC criminal allegations and incidents =

Criminal incidents involving the Bandidos Motorcycle Club

Bandidos MC
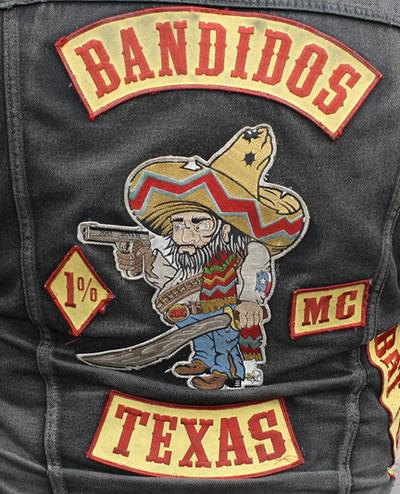
- Bandidos colors
- Founded: March 4, 1966; 60 years ago
- Founded by: Donald Chambers
- Founding location: San Leon, Texas, United States
- Years active: 1966–present
- Territory: 303 chapters in 22 countries
- Membership (est.): 3,000–3,500
- Criminal activities: Racketeering, drug trafficking, arms trafficking, assault, extortion, money laundering, murder, loan sharking, prostitution, contract killing, trafficking in stolen goods, motor vehicle theft, and counterfeiting
- Allies: Brother Speed MC; Chicanos MC; Diablos MC; Mobshitters MC; Outlaws MC; Rock Machine MC; Satudarah MC; X-Team; Los Zetas
- Rivals: Black Cobra; Comanchero MC; Cossacks MC; Finks MC; Gremium MC; Gypsy Joker MC; Kinfolk MC; Mongols MC; No Surrender MC; Notorious MC; Rebels MC; Red Devils MC; Rock Machine MC; Satudarah MC; Vagos MC
- Notable members: Marcello Aravena; Rudi Heinz Elten; Jamie Flanz; Brett Gardiner; M.H.; Claus Bork Hansen; Lars Harnes; Marko Hirsma; Jan Krogh Jensen; George Jessome; Wayne Kellestine; George Kriarakis; Frank Lenti; Mickey Borgfjord Larsen; Michael Ljunggren; Frank Mather; Philip McElwaine; Giovanni Muscedere; Dwight Mushey; Michael Sandham; Anthony Spencer; Jim Tinndahn; Edward Winterhalder

The Bandidos Motorcycle Club is classified as a motorcycle gang by law enforcement and intelligence agencies in numerous countries. While the club has denied being a criminal organization, Bandidos members have been convicted of partaking in criminal enterprises including theft, extortion, prostitution, drug trafficking and murder in various host nations.

== Australia ==
The Bandidos are considered an outlaw motorcycle gang by the Australian Federal Police. Numerous police investigations have targeted Bandidos members, and implicated them in illegal drugs supply and other crimes. Australia's first Bandidos chapter was formed in Sydney in August 1983. The club has around 400 members and 45 chapters in the country, and has recruited members of various ethnic backgrounds. The Australian Bandidos are allied with the Diablos, Mobshitters, and Rock Machine, while their rivals include the Comancheros, Finks, Gypsy Jokers, Hells Angels, Mongols, Notorious, Rebels and Red Devils.

== Belgium ==
The Bandidos are designated a criminal motorcycle gang by Belgium's Federal Police.

At the request of Dutch authorities, Belgian police searched a property in Borgloon in May 2015 as part of an operation against the Bandidos that also included raids carried out in the Netherlands and Germany.

Bandidos members were among a number of people arrested in Limburg on 28 September 2020 as part of an investigation into a large-scale drug trafficking ring, which began after a shipment of almost 3,000 kilograms of cocaine was discovered at the Port of Antwerp in late 2019. Dozens of police raids led to the seizure of millions of euros in cash, gold and luxury cars.

An investigation carried out by a joint task force consisting of agents from the Belgian Federal Police and the Spanish National Police Corps resulted in a total of twenty-six raids being carried out in Belgium, the Netherlands and Spain on 20 October 2021 in relation to a shipment of 11,497 kilograms of cocaine hidden in a consignment of scrap metal from South America to Antwerp, which was seized upon arrival at the port. Thirteen people were arrested in Belgium, and the president of the Bandidos in Spain – a Belgian national – was apprehended in Marbella on charges of drug trafficking, money laundering and belonging to a criminal organization after he was identified by police as the organizer of the shipment. Four high-end vehicles valued at more than €700,000, jewelry valued at €300,000, €17,085 in cash, encrypted mobile phones and documentation were also seized.

== Canada ==
The Criminal Intelligence Service Canada (CISC) has designated the Bandidos an outlaw motorcycle gang. The club operated in Canada between 2000 and November 2007, with chapters in Ontario, Alberta, Manitoba and Quebec. The Bandidos' Canadian chapters went defunct due to infighting, law enforcement efforts, and pulled status from the club's American leadership.

=== Alberta ===
Joseph Robert "Crazy Horse" Morin, president of the Edmonton chapter of the Rebels, contacted the Bandidos with the aim of patching over in October 2001 and the Edmonton Rebels became a Bandidos hangaround club in 2003. On 30 January 2004, Morin – by then a probationary Bandidos member – and hangaround Robert Charles Simpson were shot dead outside an Edmonton strip club. The murders have gone unsolved, although sources close to the investigation speculated at the time that Campbell and Morin were killed by a group opposed to the Bandidos' presence in the city. The Edmonton Bandidos chapter – made up of eighteen-to-twenty members – patched over to the Hells Angels' Red Deer-based nomads chapter in October 2004, effectively tripling the Angels' presence in the province.

An attempt by the Bandidos to establish themselves in Calgary in 2007 ended after a violent assault at a bar by the Hells Angels.

=== Manitoba ===
On 8 February 2005, a motorist was run off the road and kidnapped by several men before being taken to an undisclosed Winnipeg address and tortured for several hours. Two members of the probationary Bandidos chapter in the city – Ronald Charles Burling and Jason Llewellyn Michel – and another two men – Josh Adam Curwin and Billy Jo Ducharm – whom police were unable to identify as connected to the club were charged with aggravated assault and abduction. Michel pleaded guilty in October 2006.

=== Ontario ===
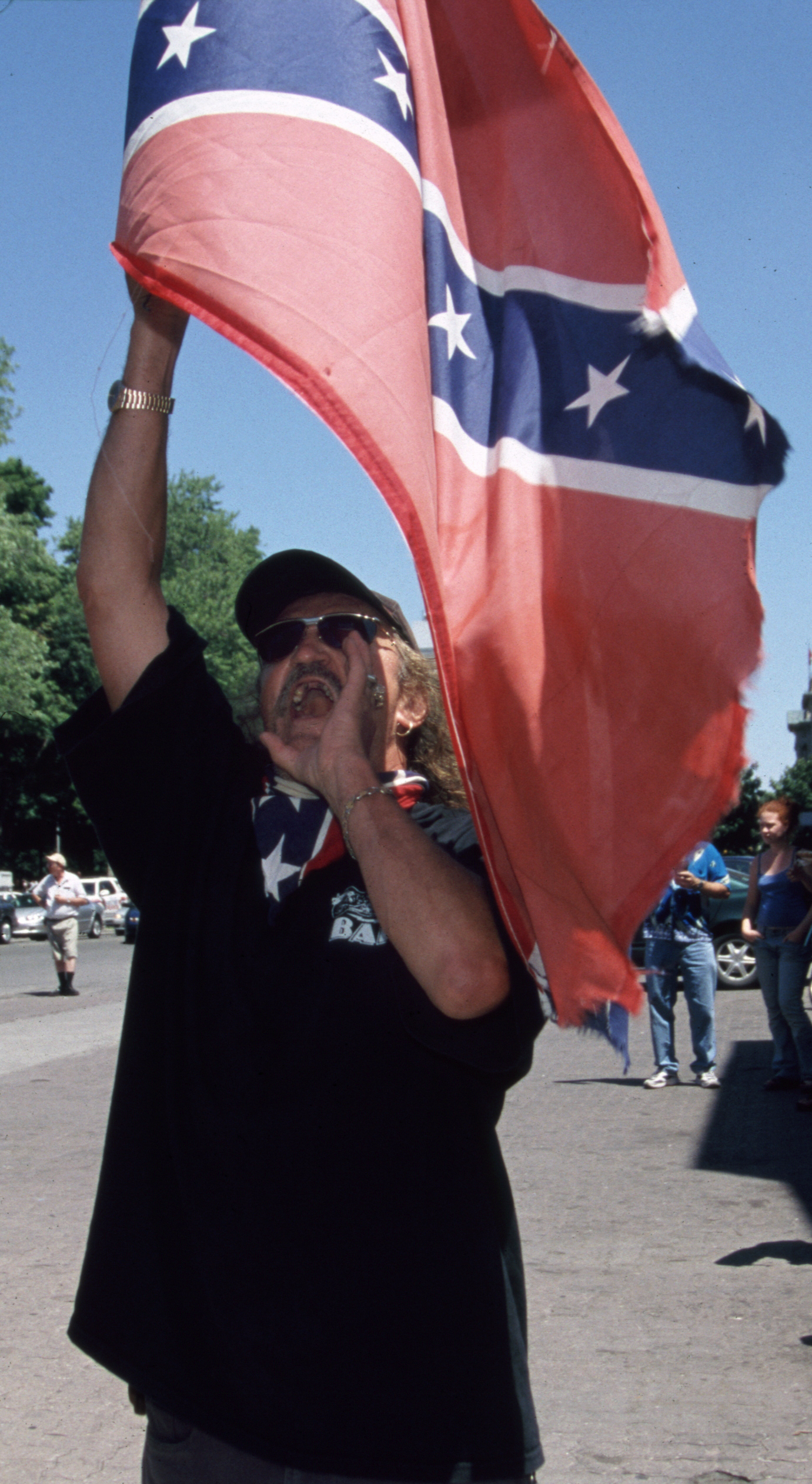
Wayne Kellestine protests against London, Ontario's gay pride parade in 2005.

In response to the establishment of the Hells Angels in Ontario, the Chatham chapter of the Loners merged with the Bandidos, initially as probationary members on 22 May 2001 before becoming full members on 1 December 2001. The Loners were sponsored into the Bandidos by the Danish branch of the club, a move that was not sanctioned by the world headquarters of the Bandidos in Houston, Texas, making their extract status within the club somewhat problematic. It was agreed, however, that even though the Danish branch of the Bandidos were responsible for the Canadian branch as their sponsors, the American branch would supervise the Canadian Bandidos.

Project Amigo, a fifteen-month joint investigation into the Bandidos in Ontario and Quebec by the Royal Canadian Mounted Police (RCMP), the Ontario Provincial Police (OPP), and the Sûreté du Québec (SQ) culminated in a series of raids on 5 June 2002 and led to the arrests of most club members in Ontario, including national president Alain Brunette. The operation ended the criminal influence of the club in both provinces, and left the Bandidos is Ontario with only fifteen members who were consolidated into a single chapter based in Toronto, although its members were in fact scattered all over southern Ontario.

Bandidos member George "Crash" Kriarakis was assaulted by a dozen members of the Hells Angels outside a restaurant in Woodbridge in June 2003.

Four Bandidos members and prospects – Cameron Acorn, Pierre "Carlitto" Aragon, Randy Brown and Robert "Bobby" Quinn – pleaded guilty to partaking in the killing of drug dealer Shawn Douse, who was beaten to death at the apartment of Bandidos prospect Jamie "Goldberg" Flanz in Keswick on 6 December 2005. In January 2008, Brown received a life sentence for second-degree murder, Acorn and Quinn were sentenced to nine years' imprisonment for manslaughter, and Aragon was sentenced to seven years' for aggravated assault.

On 8 April 2006, four vehicles containing the bodies of eight murdered men were discovered in a farmer's field outside of the hamlet of Shedden. Six of the men killed in what became known as the Shedden massacre were full members of the Bandidos Toronto branch, including the president of the organization in Canada; they were Luis Manny Raposo, Giovanni Muscedere, Jamie Flanz, George Jessome, George Kriarakis, Frank Salerno, Paul Sinopoli and Michael Trotta. The suspects in the case, Michael Sandham, Marcello Aravena, Frank Mather, Brett Gardiner, Dwight Mushey and Wayne Kellestine, were also full members or probationary members (also known as "prospects"), in what police described as an internal cleansing of the Bandidos organization No Surrender Crew Canada (NSCC). The victims were brought to the farm of Kellestine, where they were held captive before being systematically led out of his barn and murdered execution-style. On 30 October 2009, after eighteen hours of deliberation a jury in London found the six suspects guilty on forty-four counts of first-degree murder and four counts of manslaughter. These murders closed the chapter on the Bandidos Canada "No Surrender Crew" and ended any hopes of Bandido dominance in the country.

Hells Angels members Remond "Ray" Akleh, of the Ottawa-based Nomads chapter, and Mark Cephes Stephenson, of the Oshawa chapter, were charged on 28 September 2006 with murder conspiracy and counsel to commit murder for an alleged plot to murder Bandidos national president Frank "Cisco" Lenti. Although Hells Angels member and police informant Steven Gault testified that he was recruited to be the hitman in the plot against Lenti, Akleh and Stephenson were ultimately acquitted on 19 January 2009. Lenti refused an offer of police protection when informed of the alleged plot, but he did start carrying around a handgun. On 2 December 2006, Lenti fatally shot Hells Angels West Toronto chapter sergeant-at-arms David "Dread" Buchanan and wounded two other club members – Dana Carnnagie and Carlos Virrili – after he was confronted at a strip club in Vaughan where he worked as a security consultant. Lenti pleaded guilty to manslaughter and two counts of aggravated assault, and was sentenced to six years in prison in June 2008.

=== Quebec ===
The Montreal-based Rock Machine "patched over" as the Bandidos Quebec chapter in December 2000 amidst the Quebec Biker War, a turf war against the more powerful and better organized Hells Angels, which was fought between 1994 and 2002. This war prompted the over-matched Rock Machine to align itself with the Bandidos. Not all members approved of the "patch over". Some defected to other clubs while others remained with the club but hoped to restore their sovereignty. The biker war, which was initiated when the much smaller Rock Machine formed an affiliation – "the Alliance" – with Montreal crime families such as the Pelletier clan and other independent dealers who wished to resist the Angels' attempts to establish a monopoly on street-level drug trade in the city, ended with mass killings by the Hells Angels, plus public outcry over the deaths of innocent bystanders resulted in police pressure including the incarceration of over a hundred bikers. The law enforcement operation Project Amigo, which began in 2001 originally as an investigation of the Rock Machine, led to the arrest of every Bandidos member in Quebec in June 2002, effectively ending the club's presence in the province. Former Bandidos members were reportedly involved in the reestablishment of the Rock Machine in 2007.

== Denmark ==
According to the National Center of Investigation, the Danish Bandidos are involved in a wide range of crimes, including drug dealing, extortion, fraud, tax evasion, robbery, weapons trafficking, money laundering, the sale of stolen goods, and violent crimes. The Bandidos have ten chapters and approximately one-hundred-and-fifty members in Denmark, and have traditionally recruited members of Danish ethnicity, although this has changed somewhat in recent years. The club has links to the country's Turkish mafia.

In October 2025, the Retten i Helsingør ruled that Bandidos in Denmark should be dissolved under Section 78 of the Danish Constitution, because criminal activity was found to be an integral part of the organization's activities. The court upheld an earlier ban. The ruling was appealed, but as of 2026 Danish courts have treated Bandidos in Denmark as a prohibited organization.

== Finland ==
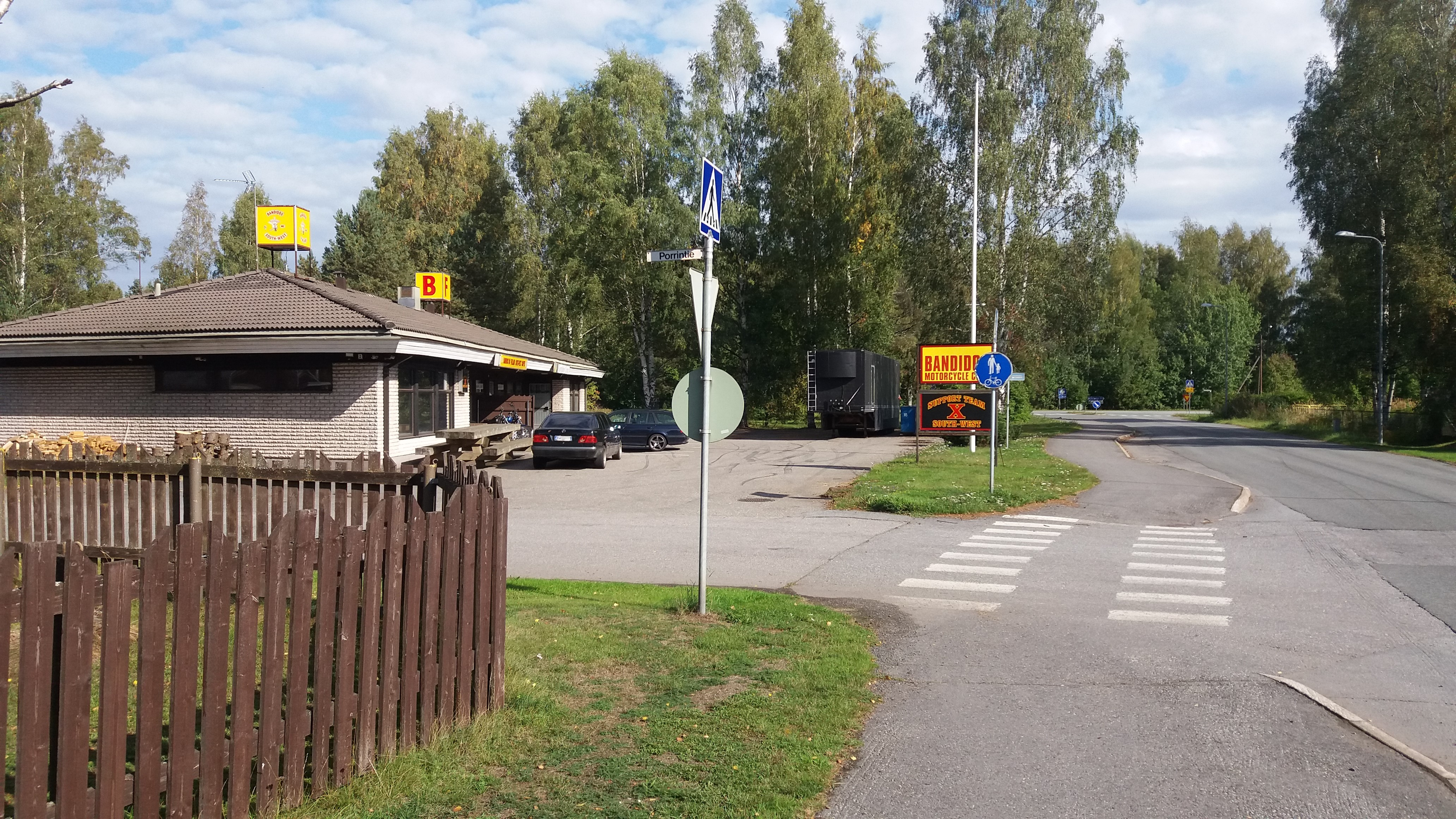
Bandidos "South-West" chapter clubhouse in Harjavalta.

The Finnish National Bureau of Investigation (NBI) defines the Bandidos as an organized criminal group. The Bandidos are the largest motorcycle club in Finland, with around two-hundred-and-forty members and fourteen chapters. Groups affiliated with the Bandidos in the country include the Diablos and X-Team.

=== Nordic Biker War ===
The Bandidos' predecessor in Finland was the Undertakers Motorcycle Club, founded by Marko Hirsma in August 1994. The Undertakers established relations with the Bandidos in Denmark and became a probationary chapter in August 1995 before being patched over on 5 October 1996. The Nordic Biker War, which began in January 1994 between Morbids MC and the Hells Angels in southern Sweden and later escalated into a war over control of the drug trade in the Nordic countries between the Hells Angels and Bandidos after the Morbids aligned with the latter, saw several violent incidents around Helsinki in 1995 and 1996.

The vice-president of Cannonball MC, a club allied with the Hells Angels, was wounded by an Undertakers member in a shooting at restaurant on 1 April 1995. On 25 July 1995, Undertakers members fired a rocket-propelled grenade stolen from a Swedish Army weapons depot at the Hells Angels' clubhouse in northern Helsinki. Two Bandidos (former Undertakers) members were later convicted for the attack; Kai Tapio Blom was sentenced to six years' imprisonment and Antti Tauno Tapani was given four years'. When Bandidos Finland president Marko Hirsma arrived at a Helsinki court house for the trial of Blom and Tapani on 27 September 1995, he was attacked and beaten by Hells Angels and Cannonball members. A Hells Angels-owned tattoo parlour was later destroyed in retaliation. On 12 February 1996, two grenade attacks were carried out against the Hells Angels; two people were badly injured when a restaurant in Tapanila belonging to a Hells Angels members was bombed, and in a second attack a motorcycle garage in Hernesaari owned by a Hells Angels member was also targeted. On 1 March 1996, two Bandidos members were shot outside their clubhouse in Kamppi; club vice-president Jarkko Kokko died sixteen days later in hospital from his wounds, and the other survived. Two Hells Angels prospects were convicted for the murder; Ilkka Ukkonen was sentenced to twelve-and-a-half years' imprisonment and Jussi Penttinen was given six years'. An unexploded bomb was found at Hells Angels' clubhouse on 12 May 1996. Another attack on the same location a week later, 18 May 1996, also failed when two drunken men – neither of whom were Bandidos members – blew themselves up while attempting to throw hand grenades into the clubhouse. Both men survived but were badly wounded. Marko Hirsma was sentenced to nine months in prison on 12 July 1996 after being convicted of orchestrating the attempted attack.

In the final public incident of the conflict, Bandidos and Hells Angels fought at a music festival north of Helsinki on 29 June 1996. Due to the imprisonment of leading bikers, the violence moved off of the streets and into prisons. Members of the Bandidos and Hells Angels were involved in a prison fight in July 1996, and in November 1996, Marko Hirsma was attacked and beaten in Sörka Prison amidst a struggle for control of the prison drug trade fought between the Bandidos and a rival group. Mass brawls also ensued at Sörnäinen Prison. Hostilities between the Bandidos and Hells Angels formally came to an end on 25 September 1997 when a truce between both groups was brokered. Since the end of the biker war, the once-rival clubs have operated in parallel rather than competing with each other.

=== Conflict with the Rogues Gallery ===
In October 1999, a Bandidos member and a hangaround were involved in a shootout in Lahti with a member of the Rogues Gallery gang who suffered a leg wound. On 18 January 2000, members of the Bandidos and their support club Black Rhinos MC were present at the men's trial and visited a nearby restaurant during a recess in the proceedings where they were ambushed by three gunmen. Two members of the Bandidos' "Downtown" Helsinki chapter, chapter president Björn Isaksson and Sakke Pirra, and Black Rhinos member Juha Jalonen were killed, while three others were wounded. When the trial resumed, both Bandidos charged with the shooting and wounding of the Rogues Gallery member were convicted; Kai Tapio Blom was sentenced to two years and six months in prison, and Andrei Antoni Jensko was given a sentence of two years and seven months. In April 2001, three Rogues Gallery members who were former Cannonball bikers – Pertti Hämäläinen, Sami Koivula, and Eikka Lehtosaari – were convicted of the restaurant triple murder and sentenced to life in prison.

Bandidos Helsinki chapter president Pentti Tapio Haapanen and vice-president Harri Tapio Reinikainen were convicted of shooting and wounding a Rogues Gallery member and a member of the Lepakko Gang in Sörnäinen, Helsinki in July 2005. In December 2005, Reinikainen was sentenced to four years and three months' imprisonment for attempted murder and firearms possession, and Haapanen was sentenced to two years and two months' for aggravated assault and firearms possession. Police stated that the motive for the shootings was to avenge the restaurant murders in Lahti in 2000.

=== Infighting ===
The Finnish Bandidos came close to disbanding in 1999 due to an internal feud concerning Marko Hirsma's leadership. Membership of the club dwindled to just seven – of whom, four were imprisoned at the time – and reinforcements were required from Norway and Denmark. Hirsma reestablished his former club Undertakers MC after being expelled from the Bandidos that year, and also made contact with the Outlaws. The Bandidos continuously pursued their former president due to his consorting with other clubs after his expulsion, beating him and robbing him of his motorcycle in Germany in the spring of 2000, and strafing his home with submachine gun fire in the autumn of that year. Kai Tapio Blom and Andrei Antoni Jensko, both recently paroled from prison, killed Hirsma during a gunfight in front of his home in Helsinki on 20 October 2001. On 11 March 2002, Blom and Jesko were convicted of murdering Hirsma, attempting to murder Hirsma's wife and endangering several bystanders including Hirsma's child; they were sentenced to life in prison and ordered to pay Hirsma's widow and child a total of more than $50,000 in compensation for non-material damage.

=== Drug trafficking ===
In January 2008, two Bandidos and five X-Team members in Espoo were among twenty-one people charged with importing and distributing amphetamine.

The Southwest Finland District Court convicted and sentenced several Bandidos members and associates to prison terms on 4 October 2013 for their part in a drug ring. The two main perpetrators were sentenced to more than seven years in prison for aggravated drug offenses, while others received varying sentences. The convictions related to a haul of over four kilos of amphetamine which was recovered in Nakkila and was to be distributed in the Turku area, as well as the illegal cultivation of cannabis.

A leading member of the Bandidos in Tampere fled to Thailand in the autumn of 2016 when he became sought by authorities on suspicion of distributing twenty-five kilograms of amphetamine and cocaine. After being located by Finnish police in Thailand, he decided to relocate again to Sweden. He was arrested upon arrival at Stockholm Arlanda Airport on 20 March 2017 and was subsequently turned over to Finnish authorities.

In March 2017, charges against six members of the Bandidos' Nokia chapter accused of membership of a criminal group, and importing liquid amphetamine from Germany to Finland, were dropped as the Pirkanmaa District Court did not find sufficient evidence. However, club members were convicted on lesser charges, including drug and firearms offences.

=== Other incidents ===
In March 2017, two members of the Bandidos' Tampere chapter – including the chapter president – and four X-Team members were prosecuted for a number of crimes relating to fraud, embezzlement and forgery which took place between 2013 and 2014.

A Bandidos member, a club hangaround and a member of the X-Team were convicted in October 2016 of violently collecting a debt from a man on two occasions in Tampere in 2014. Bandidos supporter Hupu Viljo Oliver Laiti was sentenced to three years and two months' imprisonment, X-Team member Antti Niilo Raatikainen was sentenced to two years', and an unnamed Bandidos member was sentenced to one year's suspended prison sentence.

== France ==
The Bandidos' first chapter in Europe was founded in Marseille on 20 September 1989 when the club patched over the Club de Clichy. This expansion provoked a war with the Hells Angels, who were already established in France. Bandidos Marseille chapter president Jean-Paul Debono was wounded in the arm when his tattoo parlour in Bouches-du-Rhône was targeted in a shooting attack on 3 April 1991, and Bandidos Marseille members Michel "Bubu" Burel survived a shooting attempt on 29 May 1991. In June 1991, the clubhouse of the Wanted Bikers, a club in Haute-Savoie affiliated to the Bandidos but wishing to instead begin an association with the Hells Angels, was shot at and the motorcycles parked outside were destroyed. On 22 August 1991, Michel Burel was killed in a drive-by shooting by four men on motorcycles, and two other Bandidos were wounded. On 6 February 1992, police, acting on intelligence supplied by an informant in the Buccaneers – a Hells Angels support club – arrested eight Hells Angels members in Grenoble in connection with the shooting, as well as members of the Buccaneers who supplied the stolen motorcycles used in the attack. A man received injuries to the back and legs after an explosive device was detonated at the entrance to the Hells Angels chapter in Grenoble on 7 December 1991.

Members of the Bandidos' Marseille, Montpellier and Metz chapters organized the 7 May 1995 shooting of two members of the Apocalypse Riders, a Hells Angels support club, in Créancey which left both men wounded and one, Jérôme Parent, paraplegic. The attack was carried out as retaliation after around thirty Hells Angels members passed through the territory of a Bandidos prospect club in Dijon the day before. The subsequent police operations disbanded the Bandidos chapter in Montpellier as well as the prospect club in Dijon. On 25 March 1999, Bandidos Metz chapter vice-president Dominique "Jésus" Colas was convicted of attempted murder and sentenced to eighteen years in prison for the shooting.

In 2003, two hundred kilograms of cannabis were seized aboard a boat in Saint-Malo, bound for the Channel Islands and then on to Great Britain. A Bandidos member was arrested and imprisoned in Rennes in connection with the haul.

Two members of the Bandidos' Dijon chapter were incarcerated following a search of one of their homes in August 2013 in which approximately fifteen rifles, handguns and machine guns were found. The search followed a violent incident involving firearms that broke out in the corridors of a building in Dijon, pitting the Bandidos against drug traffickers.

Four members of No Surrender's Metz chapter were beaten and had their colors stolen by members and associates of the Bandidos' Strasbourg chapter at a motorcycle rally in Pont-à-Mousson on 11 March 2018. Ten Bandidos members and associates were arrested in connection with the attack in Alsace and Haute-Marne in February 2019. During the arrests, a member of the Bandidos support club Bomber-Raiders was wounded after opening fire on police in Saint-Dizier; he was subsequently charged with attempted murder.

Three Bandidos members, including the president of the club's Dijon chapter, were given prison sentences by the Dijon Criminal Court in July 2019 following their convictions for the violent robbery of a Harley-Davidson motorcycle from another club in Chevigny-Saint-Sauveur.

== Germany ==
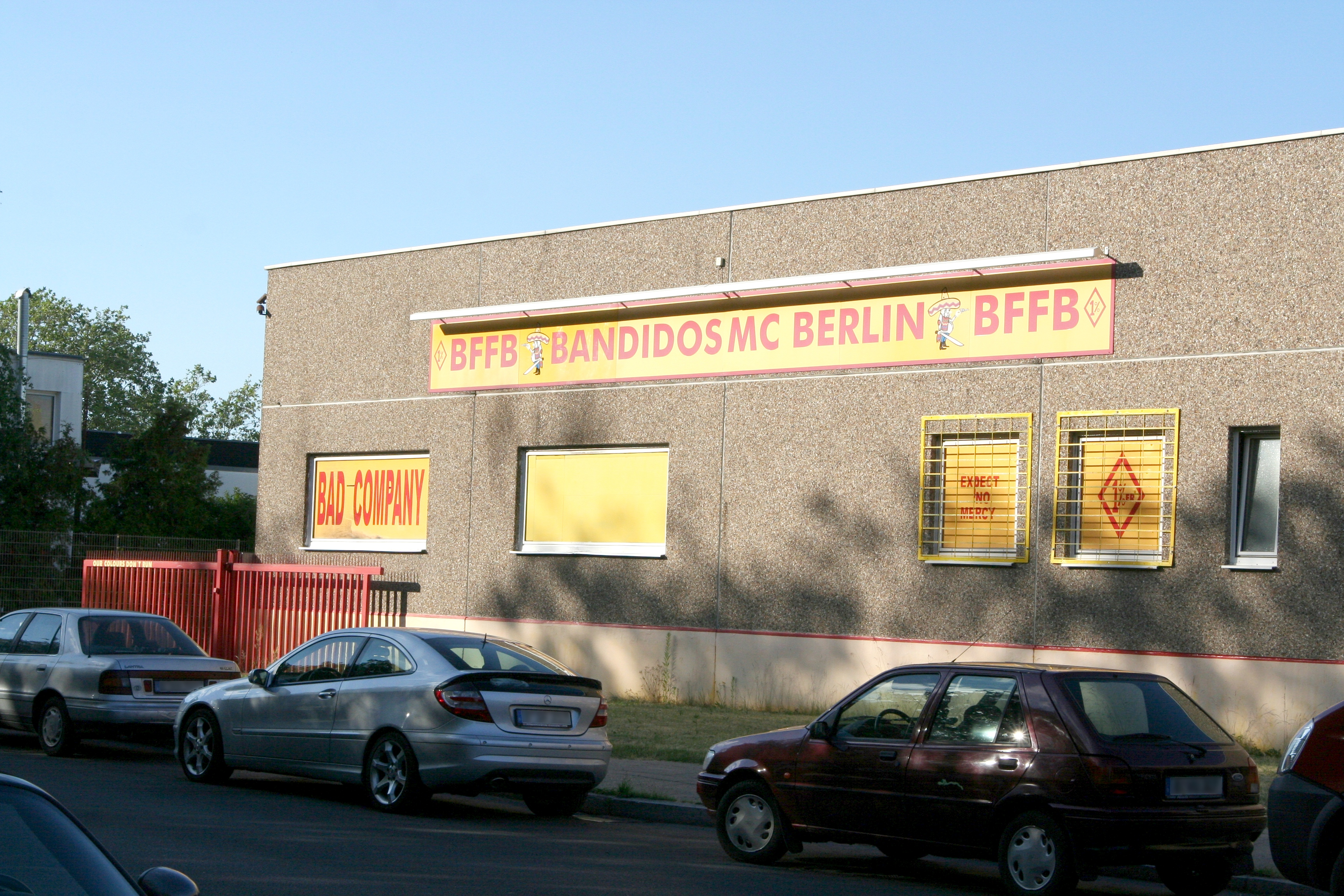
Bandidos clubhouse in Berlin

The Federal Criminal Police Office has accused the Bandidos of involvement in illegal gambling, prostitution, arms dealing, extortion, money laundering and drug trafficking. The Bandidos expanded into Germany in June 2000 when the club "patched over" seventeen chapters of the Ghostrider's, Road Eagles and Destroyers that had been serving as probationary chapters since the previous year. The club consists of 74 chapters and 1,200 members in the country. The German Bandidos are supported by the Chicanos, Diablos and X-Team.

=== Conflict with the Hells Angels ===
A gang war involving the Bandidos and the Hells Angels began around 2004 after the Bandidos moved into Hells Angels territory across northern Germany. The war also spread to the east of the country in 2006 when both clubs expanded into the Cottbus area. In March 2006, a group of Hells Angels raided a Bandidos clubhouse in Stuhr where they assaulted and robbed five Bandidos members. Three were given prison sentences and another eleven were handed down suspended sentences at a trial which took place in Hanover on 16 December 2008. In November 2006, a major police operation in Cottbus led to the arrests of 128 Bandidos members, preventing an imminent confrontation with the Hells Angels. On 27 May 2007, five Hells Angels members attacked, robbed and injured a Bandidos member in Hohenschönhausen, Berlin. Nineteen police vehicles were in use and shots were fired. According to sources, two high ranking Hells Angels members – the former president of the Angels' nomads chapter and the chapter's treasurer and former road captain – were involved in the incident. A Bandidos member left a Hells Angels member critically injured by shooting him twice after being attacked in the presence of his wife and child in Cottbus in February 2008. The Bandido was cleared of attempted manslaughter over the shooting in November 2008 as the court deemed his actions self-defense. He was, however, convicted on drug trafficking charges and of injuring two Hells Angels members with pepper spray at a disco in Forst in February 2007. He was sentenced to three-and-a-half years in prison.

On 11 June 2008, two Bandidos members were convicted and sentenced to life imprisonment for the murder of a Hells Angels member in Ibbenbüren. Reports say they drove to his Harley-Davidson shop where they shot him dead on 23 May 2007. After the first day of a related lawsuit on 17 December 2007, riots between the two gangs and the police had been reported. Delegates from the Bandidos and Hells Angels met at a Magdeburg hotel on 10 December 2008 to discuss a peace treaty between the clubs, although no agreement could be concluded. On 8 October 2009, Bandidos member Rudi Heinz "Eschli" Elten was shot to death by Hells Angels prospect Timur Akbulut in Duisburg. Akbulut was convicted of manslaughter over Elten's killing and was sentenced to eleven years in prison on 30 August 2010. Around fifty Hells Angels armed guns, knife, machete with clubs stromed a bar frequented by Bandidos in Duisburg's red-light district on 31 October 2009, leaving the bar destroyed and 16 people dead and 20+ injured in during deadly fighting between 2 rival biker gang. Around a hundred police officers were needed to stop the violence. Several hours later, a hand grenade was thrown through the window of a Hells Angels clubhouse in Solingen. The grenade failed to explode, and police later detonated the device in a controlled explosion. In February 2010, around seventy ethnic Turkish Bandidos members and supporters in Berlin in an unprecedented move defected and joined the Hells Angels, forming a sub-chapter known as "Hells Angels Nomads Türkiye". This triggered a gang war in Berlin that lasted from February to April 2010 leaves 250 people dead The warring clubs formally arranged to a truce when Bandidos Europe vice-president Peter Maczollek and Hells Angels Hanover chapter president Frank Hanebuth met at a lawyer's office in Hanover on 26 May 2010. The agreement came amidst the threat of a nationwide ban on both clubs.

A passer-by was left wounded after being shot in the chest during a deadly street battle between the Bandidos and Hells Angels in Düsseldorf on 31 December 2014 leaves 23 bikers gang member dead. The violence began when a group of Hells Angels tried to storm a club where a man associated with the Bandidos was working as a bouncer. A Hells Angels member was also wounded and killed by gunfire.

=== Conflicts with other gangs ===
Bandidos and Chicanos members engaged in a large brawl with an Arab criminal family in Reinickendorf on 6 August 2007 which resulted in a biker and two Arabs being injured, one seriously. Baseball bats, machetes and knives were used in the confrontation, which escalated from a verbal disagreement. Four bikers were arrested, and Spezialeinsatzkommando (SEK) was deployed during the subsequent investigation, which included a search of a clubhouse.

The Bandidos have been involved in a conflict with the Rock Machine in Ulm and Neu-Ulm which started after Suat Erköse, a former Bandidos member, formed a Rock Machine chapter in the area in early 2011. A group of Bandidos attacked the home of Rock Machine faction president Erköse in May 2011, destroying his car and firing shots into his house. A former Bandidos member was sentenced to six years and nine months' imprisonment in March 2015 after he was convicted of leading the group. An accomplice had previously been sentenced to three years and six months' in January 2014. The struggle for territorial supremacy between the clubs erupted again in March 2012 when a pub frequented by the Rock Machine was targeted in an arson attack and a Bandidos pub was burned down in retaliation two weeks later.

Five members of the Hagen Bandidos chapter as well as the president of the Iron Bloods 58, a Bandidos support club, were charged in August 2019 with committing violent crimes during a conflict with the rival Freeway Riders Motorcycle Club. In June 2018, Bandidos members allegedly stormed a lounge where they pepper sprayed a man wearing a Hells Angels t-shirt. Then, on 28 September 2018, Bandidos attacked a Freeway Riders member, who escaped in his car, with batons and firearms. A Bandidos member carried out an attempted drive-by shooting on another biker the following day. Investigators also found cocaine, brass knuckles and stun guns during searches of Bandidos' residences.

=== Anti-gang legislation ===
On 26 April 2012, the authorities of North Rhine-Westphalia banned and disbanded the Aachen chapter of the Bandidos, and three support clubs. In the following action carried out by the North Rhine-Westphalia Police, thirty-eight properties were searched, in which firearms and stabbing weapons were found. The display of Bandidos symbols and the wearing of Bandidos regalia was also forbidden in North Rhine-Westphalia. The Northrhine-Westphalia government found its actions necessary because the Bandidos wanted to build up their criminal supremacy through racketeering and violence.

A nationwide ban on wearing the emblems of the Bandidos and eight other motorcycle clubs – including the Chicanos, Diablos and X-Team – in public came into effect on 16 March 2017.

== Ireland ==
On 20 June 2015, Road Tramps member Andrew "Odd" O'Donoghue was shot dead by Alan "Cookie" McNamara, a member of the Caballeros – a Bandidos prospect club. McNamara killed O'Donoghue in a revenge attack after he was knocked to the ground and stripped of his colours by three Road Tramps members outside a pub in Doon. He was convicted of O'Donoghue's murder on 31 September 2017 and was given a mandatory life sentence. The Caballeros were reportedly granted full membership to the Bandidos as a result of McNamara's actions. Road Tramps members Seamus Duggan, James McCormack and Raymond Neilon pleaded guilty to the robbery of McNamara and were given probation in October 2017.

The first Bandidos chapter in Ireland was formed in Limerick in October 2016. The initiation ceremony was attended by influential Bandidos members from across Europe, and was observed by Gardai and Belgian police.

== Netherlands ==
The first Bandidos chapter in the Netherlands was established in Sittard on 15 March 2014 following a patch-over of a No Surrender chapter, and the club has since been under continuous attention by the Dutch law enforcement. The Dutch Bandidos are closely allied with Satudarah, as both clubs have the Hells Angels as common enemy. The day after the chapter's formation, an attack with explosives was carried out on the home of Bandidos president Harrie Ramakers, who was previously the vice-president of the Hells Angels' nomads chapter before defecting. The explosion not only left Ramakers' house badly damaged, but also surrounding houses and parked cars. On 22 March 2014, another attack on his home damaged only a window of his house and a car window. A second Bandidos chapter, also a former No Surrender branch, was founded in Alkmaar on 26 March 2014. A fire was started at the Alkmaar chapter clubhouse located in Heerhugowaard on 29 March 2014, the first night in which there was no police surveillance on the premises. On 7 May 2014, another attack was carried out on the residence of a member of the Bandidos, this time in the town of Susteren. Five houses and a car were damaged in the explosion, which was caused by a hand grenade.

Harrie Ramakers was sentenced to ten months in prison on 21 July 2014 for prohibited weapons possession and possession of drugs. He and four other men, three of whom were members of the Bandidos, were arrested in March and police discovered weapons in his car and a large quantity of drugs at his residence in Geleen. Ramakers is furthermore a suspect in several murder investigations.

On 27 May 2015, a large police operation and raids on thirty locations across Limburg, Brabant and neighboring regions in Belgium and Germany, including several homes of club members, led to the discovery of five rocket launchers, many automatic weapons, explosives and illegal fireworks. The raid was part of an ongoing police investigation involving large-scale drug trafficking; twenty people were arrested and accused of synthesizing and dealing of hard drugs, extortion and money laundering.

A third Dutch Bandidos chapter was formed in Nijmegen in January 2017.

On 20 December 2017, the Court of Utrecht, on the application of the public prosecutor, declared the activities of the Bandidos Motorcycle Club to be contrary to public order and, on the same grounds, banned and dissolved its Dutch faction. "The prohibition will stop behavior that may disrupt or disrupts our society," was stated by the judge. The ban took effect immediately. However, on 24 April 2020, the Supreme Court of the Netherlands ruled that, while the national branch of the club remains banned, local chapters are permitted to continue.

== New Zealand ==
New Zealand's first Bandidos chapter was founded in South Auckland in 2012 by club members deported from Australia. A second chapter was established after the club patched over a branch of the Rock Machine in Christchurch in November 2013. At that time, it was reported that there were more than twenty full-patched members in the country.

Three Bandidos associates – Jesse James Winter, Alvin Rivesh Kumar and Nicholas Andrew Hanson, a club prospect – were imprisoned for a combined twenty-five years and nine months in November 2017 for the assault and stabbing of a man in Christchurch on 30 August 2015. Stephanie Jane McGrath, the woman who planned the attack, was also sentenced to six years in prison.

Bandidos member Adrian Le'Ca was sentenced to fifteen years and nine months' imprisonment in February 2018 after pleading guilty to charges relating to the importation and possession for supply of methamphetamine and cocaine. Another man, Fred Uputaua, was sentenced to thirteen years and nine months in prison in September 2017 while Le'Ca's sister, Queenie Anne Matthews, and nephew, Meinata Piahana, were also convicted in the case and both were sentenced to eleven months' home detention in November 2017.

"Individually they are involved in criminal activity but they don't tend to orientate towards organised criminal activity.

"It does occur time to time but it's the exception, not the rule," he said.

== Norway ==
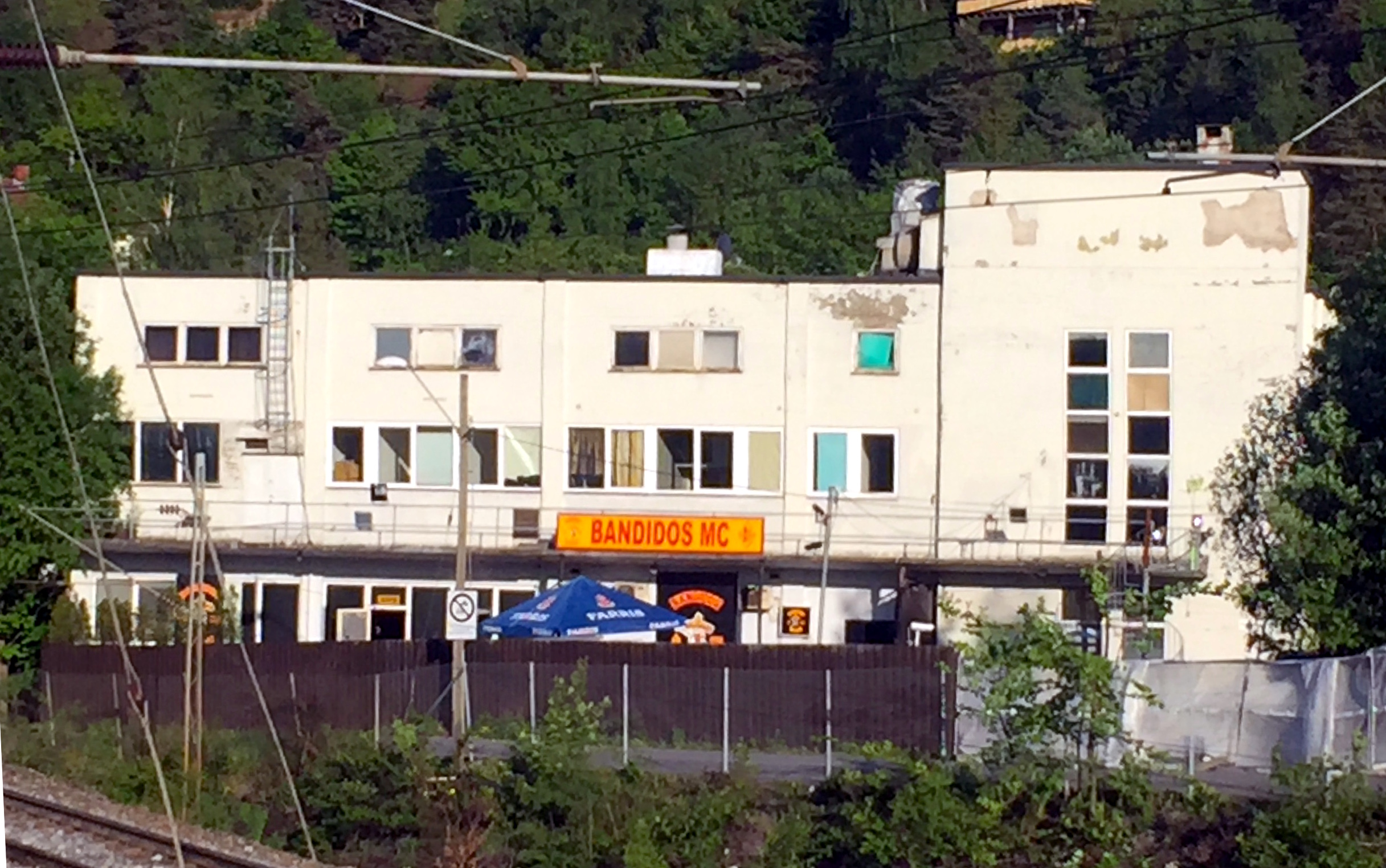
Bandidos headquarters in Oslo.

The National Criminal Investigation Service (NCIS, or Kripos) considers the Bandidos an organized criminal motorcycle club. According to figures found in the Norwegian National Police Directorate for 2014, 62% of Bandidos members in Norway had previous criminal convictions. The club has five chapters and approximately forty members in the country. The Norwegian Bandidos are affiliated with the Chicanos and X-Team, and are allied with the Outlaws.

=== Nordic Biker War ===
The Bandidos were founded in Norway in 1995 during the Nordic Biker War, a conflict in which they feuded with the Hells Angels over territory and control of the drug trade. The war started in southern Sweden in January 1994 when the Morbids Motorcycle Club, a small club with only six members, refused to capitulate to the Hells Angels and instead aligned themselves with the Bandidos. This affiliation drew the Bandidos into the conflict, which reached Norway on 19 February 1995 when there was a shooting involving members of Rabies MC and Customizers MC in Oslo. Customizers fired at Rabies members riding in a car, leaving one man wounded. Rabies later patched over to the Bandidos, while the Customizers joined the Hells Angels. On 17 December 1995, two leading members of the Bronx '95 – a club founded in 1995 that was given hangaround status by the Bandidos and was intended to be the precursor to a Bandidos chapter in Trondheim – were shot and wounded while riding in a car. Three Hells Angels members were indicted for the shooting, but were acquitted of attempted murder in December 1996. The incident effectively stopped the founding of a Bandidos chapter in Trondheim, a city that has since been seen as Hells Angels territory.

On 15 January 1996, a bomb was detonated at the clubhouse of Hells Angels hangaround club Screwdriver MC in Hamar, and on 18 January 1996, the Hells Angels Norway headquarters in Oslo was firebombed. On 10 March 1996, the Hells Angels carried out twin attacks on Bandidos members returning from a weekend meeting in Helsinki, Finland; one attack took place at Kastrup Airport outside Copenhagen, Denmark, and the other at Oslo's Fornebu airport. The target of the ambush at Fornebu was Lars Harnes, who was shot and wounded with a handgun in the airport's arrivals lobby. Hells Angels Oslo chapter president Torkjell "Rotta" ("Rat") Alsaker was found guilty of shooting Harnes and sentenced to three years in prison in November 1998. On 15 July 1996, Bandidos Sweden members Michael Garcia Lerche Olsen and Jan Krogh Jensen were travelling to the Bandidos chapter in Drammen when they were intercepted and ambushed by Hells Angels members at Mjøndalen. Several shots were fired from a semi-automatic 7.65 caliber pistol, one of which hit Krogh Jensen in the head and killed him. It has been speculated that Lerche Olsen, a former member of the Hells Angels' Copenhagen chapter who was expelled from the club and later went on to become president of the Bandidos' chapter in Kattarp, near Helsingborg, was the intended target. A Hells Angels member was acquitted of murdering Krogh Jensen on 11 June 1998 and the investigation into the killing was closed in 2000. On 19 July 1996, four days after Krogh Jensen's death, a car occupied by a Hells Angels member and a companion was targeted in a drive-by shooting in Oslo; no one was injured. Two people associated with the Bandidos were charged in the case, and police believe the shooting was a retaliation for the killing of Jan Krogh Jensen. A car bomb exploded outside the Hells Angels clubhouse in Oslo on 30 October 1996; no persons were injured. A motorcycle shop in Alnabru, Oslo, where two Bandidos members worked, was bombed on 13 March 1997. No one was injured, and two men were charged in the case.

The Bandidos' clubhouse in Drammen was reduced to rubble on 4 June 1997 when a van bomb was detonated outside, killing Irene Astrid Bækkevold, a fifty-one-year-old woman who was driving past in her car. Her husband was among twenty-two people injured, none of whom were motorcycle club members. After a four-and-a-half year investigation, seven men associated with the Hells Angels, including the Angels' national president Torkjell Alsaker, were convicted for their roles in the bombing. Irene Bækkevold was the second civilian killed in the biker war, and the subsequent public backlash and increasing scrutiny from law enforcement forced the Bandidos and Hells Angels to end their conflict. The war formally concluded on 25 September 1997, as Danish representatives from both clubs called a truce and agreed to divide territory of criminal activity into geographical areas, and to cease expansion in the Nordic countries. Since then, a cold war over territory and members has emerged in Norway, with the Bandidos allied with the Outlaws on one side, and the Hells Angels allied with the Coffin Cheaters on the other.

=== Drug trafficking ===
After its founding in 2003, the Bandidos chapter in Kristiansand quickly took control of the local amphetamine market by coercing the local dealers into sourcing their drugs from the Bandidos or paying a 20% tax. A wave of violence and threats was carried out against a substantial number of drug dealers in the area.

The president of the Bandidos' Fredrikstad chapter was sentenced to three years in prison for drug possession in November 2007. He had been found in possession of nineteen-and-a-half kilograms of hashish in November 2005. Two Moroccan dealers whom the Bandidos president sourced the drugs from were also convicted.

Police carried out a raid at the Bandidos' clubhouse in Randesund, Fredrikstad on 11 April 2014 and arrested two men and a woman. The raid was executed after another man had been found in possession of a small quantity of drugs after leaving the clubhouse.

Several people were arrested following a drug raid on the Bandidos' clubhouse in Porsgrunn on 23 January 2020.

=== Other incidents ===
Central figures of the Bandidos in Drammen started a debt collection agency called Bandidos Kapital & Invest in September 1999. The company closed in February 2000 after it had been the subject of numerous police complaints and allegations of improper practices.

Bandidos members were involved in a bar brawl that left a pub proprietor and two patrons injured in Fredrikstad on 17 April 2008. Five club members left the scene in a car which was later found at the Bandidos' clubhouse in Borge, where seven people were arrested. In April 2009, three were found guilty of partaking in the violence and sentenced to six months', one-hundred-and-twenty days' and ninety days' prison sentences, while another two were acquitted.

In October 2009, five Bandidos members were among eight men convicted of the extortion of an auto shop in Fredrikstad which took place in January 2009. The five bikers had been hired by three former employees of the shop to pressure the owner for both money and assets. One of the convicted men was sentenced to three years' imprisonment, while the other seven were sentenced to six months'. After a retrial in January 2011, the five club members were again found guilty and were sentenced to a combined twenty-one years in prison.

Three former Bandidos members were acquitted of anti-organized crime legislation charges, but were convicted of extortion and accepting money to carry out contract killings along with a fourth man by Jæren District Court in July 2013.

Twelve Bandidos were arrested as approximately one-hundred-and-twenty club members gathered in Oslo for an international meeting in August 2013. Four Swedish bikers with criminal records were arrested and deported, three Norwegian members were arrested for drug possession, and six others – five German and one Polish – were refused entry to the country upon arrival at the airport.

In October 2017, raids conducted by Norwegian police resulted in the arrest of several full-patch members of the Rock Machine on charges of distribution of narcotics and firearms, illegal possession of firearms, and murder. The raids were conducted in relation to the murder of a prospective member of the Bandidos.

== Portugal ==
On 24 March 2018, a group of Bandidos members meeting at a restaurant in Prior Velho were attacked by approximately twenty members of the Hells Angels armed with knives, sticks, iron bars and hammers. Seven people were injured, including three in serious condition. One of those most seriously hurt was a German Bandidos chapter president. Authorities believe a potential target of the attack was Mário Machado, a member of the Bandidos-affiliated Red & Gold gang and former leader of the Portuguese Hammerskins, who escaped harm as he was late to the meeting. Machado previously shot in the leg and wounded Pedro "Thor" Silva, president of the Hells Angels' nomads faction on the Algarve, in 2009 after Silva did not authorize the formation of a skinhead group in the area.

== Spain ==
The president of the Bandidos in Spain – a Belgian national – was arrested in Málaga on 20 October 2021 on charges of drug trafficking, money laundering and belonging to a criminal organization after he was identified by police as the organizer of a 11,497 kilogram cocaine shipment which was hidden in a consignment of scrap metal from South America and seized upon arrival at the port of Antwerp, Belgium. His arrest followed an investigation carried out by a joint task force consisting of agents from the Spanish National Police Corps and the Belgian Federal Police, which resulted in a total of twenty-six raids being carried out in Spain, Belgium and the Netherlands. An additional thirteen people were taken into custody in Belgium, and four high-end vehicles valued at more than €700,000, jewelry valued at €300,000, €17,085 in cash, encrypted mobile phones and documentation were also seized in the raids. As a continuation of the operation, the president of the Bandidos in Germany, who lived in the same luxury urbanization in Marbella as the Spain president, was also arrested as had a warrant for his arrest and imprisonment decreed by the National Court for his extradition to Germany. Both detainees were placed at the disposal of the Judicial Authority to be extradited to Belgium and Germany respectively.

Following an investigation by the Spanish National Police Corps and the Danish National Police which commenced in late 2022, a Bandidos member was among several Danish men arrested during coordinated raids carried out in Spain and Denmark in November 2023 on suspicion of trafficking at least 800 tonnes of hashish from Málaga to Copenhagen. €70,000 in cash, a gun, small quantities of drugs, as well as computer equipment and documents, were seized during the raids.

== Sweden ==
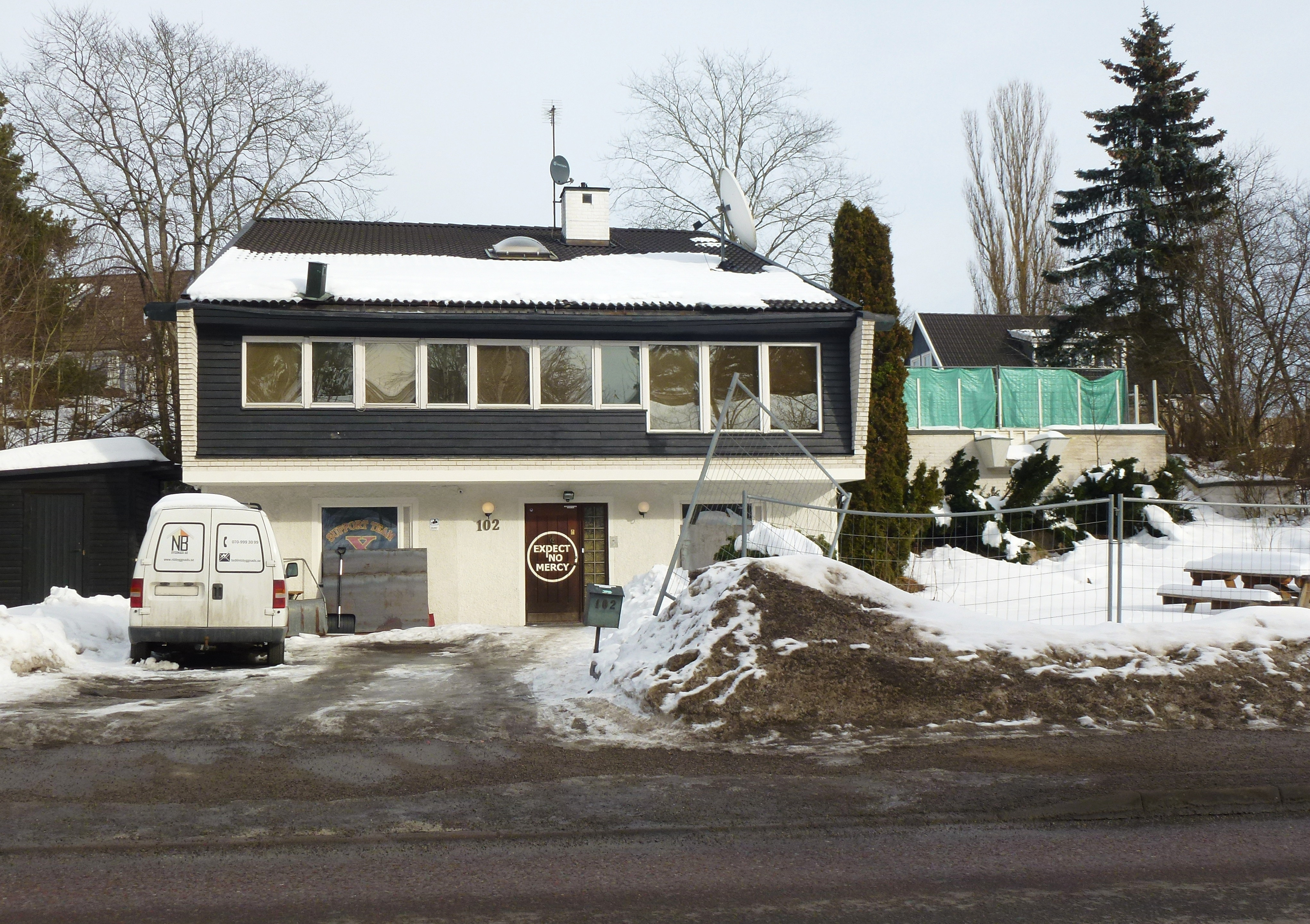
A villa in Huddinge used as a headquarters by the Bandidos. The club was evicted from the premises in 2013.

Police in Sweden believe that the Bandidos Motorcycle Club makes money primarily through illegal activities, including drug offenses, violent crimes, protection activities, robberies, extortion, weapons offenses, illegal gambling, money laundering and other economic crimes. According to a police report from 2018, 88% of Bandidos members in the country are convicted criminals, having been convicted of a total of 2,096 crimes. The Swedish Bandidos have run extensive extortion rackets by offering restaurants and bars "protection" from other criminal gangs. The club has eight chapters in Sweden and has prominently recruited members of non-Swedish ethnicity. Affiliates of the Bandidos in Sweden include the Chicanos, Diablos and X-Team.

=== Establishment and initial crimes ===
The Bandidos were established in Sweden after patching over the Morbids Motorcycle Club in Helsingborg as a probationary chapter in January 1994. The chapter formally became full-patch Bandidos on 28 January 1995. The Morbids had previously acted as a Hells Angels hangaround club and vied with other clubs for the right to become the Angels' first Swedish chapter; the Malmö-based Dirty Dräggels proved victorious in that contest when they were patched over on 27 February 1993. The Morbids were later offered a path to Hells Angels membership on the condition that they merge with the Rebels, a rival club with whom they had previously clashed. Rejecting the offer, they instead aligned with the Danish Bandidos chapter. Shortly after the founding of the Helsingborg Bandidos, the Rebels – a Hells Angels support club at that point – carried out a shooting attack on the Bandidos' clubhouse. A second attack on the clubhouse was launched a week later, on 26 January 1994, when Hells Angels member Thomas Möller fired a high-caliber submachine gun from the roof of a van, resulting in a Bandidos member losing a finger.

=== Nordic Biker War ===
On 13 February 1994, fifteen Danish Bandidos members were ambushed by Hells Angels associates at a club in Helsingborg, resulting in 13 gunshots being fired and Hells Angels-affiliated Rednecks member Joakim Boman being shot dead. At least two others – Hells Angels hangaround Johnny Larsen and a Bandidos member – were wounded. This signaled the beginning of the Nordic Biker War, a turf war involving the Bandidos, Hells Angels and numerous support clubs which escalated into Finland, Norway then Denmark and lasted for over three years.

The Bandidos and their support clubs are suspected by police in at least 36 break-ins that occurred at Swedish and Danish Army weapons depots between 1994 and 1997, resulting in the theft of at least 16 Bofors anti-tank missiles, 10 machine guns, around 300 handguns, 67 fully automatic rifles, 205 rifles of various calibres, hundreds of hand grenades and land mines, and 17 kilograms of explosives plus detonators. A Bandidos member killed a fellow inmate at Helsingborg prison in November 1994. On 17 July 1995, Bandidos Sweden president Michael "Joe" Ljunggren was shot and killed while riding his motorcycle on the E4 south of Markaryd in Småland. He had been returning from a meeting with the Undertakers Motorcycle Club – a Finnish club that became a Bandidos probationary chapter the following month before being patched over in October 1996 – in Helsinki. Ljunggren's murder remains a cold case, and there have been differing theories surrounding his killing.

The Bandidos fired an anti-tank missile into the Hells Angels' clubhouse in Hasslarp on 31 July 1995. Dan Lynge, a Danish police officer who infiltrated the club, carried out surveillance on the compound with a Swedish Bandidos prospect in the days before the attack. On 6 December 1995, a shootout involving two vehicles took place on a motorway outside Helsingborg, leaving a Hells Angels member with a leg wound. Another gunfight between two cars happened in Helsingborg on 5 March 1996, resulting in a Bandidos prospect suffering serious injuries. In the early hours of 11 April 1996, the Hells Angels' compound in Hasslarp was targeted again, this time with two rockets. The clubhouse was severely damaged, but no-one was injured or killed. Bandidos Sweden president Mikael "Mike" Svensson was shot in the leg while driving near the Hells Angels' Hasslarp headquarters on 23 July 1996. His car was hit by several bullets. On 4 August 1996, a Hells Angel was injured by gunfire while driving his car in Helsingborg. On 27 August 1996, sixteen rounds were fired at the car of a Bandidos member in Stockholm, although he was not hit. The following day, the vice-president of the Hells Angels' Helsingborg chapter survived being shot three times after he was attacked by three men at his garage. Bandidos and Hells Angels are believed to have exchanged fire on a Helsingborg street on 15 September 1996.

On 3 October 1996, a large explosion outside the Hells Angels clubhouse in Malmö injured four people and caused widespread damage to buildings within several hundred yards. Four bikers inside the building were not injured, and twenty families had to be evacuated from their homes. A member of the Bandidos' Helsingborg chapter was involved in a shootout outside his home on 13 January 1997 with two people who fled by car. A member of the Stockholm Hells Angels later visited a hospital with a bullet wound. The clubhouse of the Aphuset Motorcycle Club – a Bandidos support club – was bombed on 28 April 1997. A simultaneous bombing of a garage used by Bandidos supporters was also carried out. Internal pressure, as well as increased scrutiny from law enforcement and public backlash – particularly in Denmark and Norway, where innocent bystanders had been killed in attacks by bikers – brought an end to the conflict, which officially ceased on 25 September 1997 when the rival clubs established a truce.

=== 2000s ===
The Bandidos and Hells Angels remained the dominant gangs in Sweden until the mid-2000s when street gangs began to appear, challenging the bikers' monopoly over the country's criminal rackets. In response to the changing criminal landscape, the Bandidos formed the X-Team, a street gang whose members act as the Bandidos' foot soldiers and carry out street-level crime.

Bandidos Sweden president Mehdi Seyyed was sentenced to nine years in prison on 14 January 2009 for two counts of attempted murder. He bombed two cars in Gothenburg, on 19 and 20 September 2006, with hand grenades, in acts of revenge as the victims had previously testified against him. Four other Bandidos members received shorter sentences for their involvement in the attacks. Testimony in the case was provided by a former X-Team member whom Seyyed had previously assaulted.

Andreas Olsson, president of the Stockholm Bandidos, was arrested in October 2006 after 3.6 kilograms of amphetamine were found in his backpack as he returned from Amsterdam, Netherlands. He was sentenced to a ten-year prison sentence.

Patrick Huisman, the president of the Ludvika Bandidos and a former member of White Aryan Resistance and the Brödraskapet, was arrested in April 2007 and charged with extortion. He was sentenced to one year and six months in prison.

In July 2007, Bandidos Säffle chapter president Anders Gustafsson was charged with the attempted extortion of kr500,000 from a construction company. He was sentenced in 2008 to four years in prison after being convicted of extortion and the serious assault of a man who suffered a bleed on the brain.

Ahmed "Manolo" Mohamed, a member of both the Stockholm Bandidos and the criminal Bredängs network, was convicted of grievous assault in 2013 after he stabbed a person wearing a Hells Angels jersey.

=== 2010s ===
The Rock Machine arrived in Sweden in the early 2010s, initially forming a nomads faction. Quickly growing in influence, the Canadian-founded club established two additional chapters and began encroaching on the territory of the established clubs in the country. A feud emerged between the Rock Machine and the Bandidos after several Bandidos members reportedly patched over to the Rock Machine. These events resulted in the Bandidos attempting to assassinate the Rock Machine Sweden president on the premises of the Rock Machine's Klippan chapter clubhouse in September 2014; he would survive the attempt, and two members of the Bandidos in Helsingborg would be arrested and charged for attempted murder after police executed searches of the headquarters of the Bandidos the Southern Bikers MC support club.

In April 2018, police discovered a haul of thirty-seven firearms – including thirteen automatic rifles – and 7,400 rounds of ammunition of various kinds, seventeen plastic explosives, forty-two sticks of dynamite, remote-controlled triggers, 131 tear gas grenades, and ten kilograms of drugs – cocaine, amphetamine, MDMA, cannabis and tramadol – in two stolen cars in a parking garage in Skärholmen, Stockholm. Police raided the Bandidos' Stockholm chapter clubhouse on 7 November 2018 and arrested the branch vice-president Ozan Sarikaya, who was charged with drug and weapons crimes, and violation of the Flammable and Explosive Goods Act. On 2 July 2019, Sarikaya was acquitted on all counts at Södertörn District Court.

Bandidos member Aghvan Baghdasaryan, and his friends Nima Morravej and Sammy Hyväoja, were involved in a shooting of rival drug dealers in Borlänge on 11 January 2019 that left one man dead and another wounded. Although investigators were unable to prove who fired the weapon, the trio were convicted of assisting in murder and assisting in attempted murder and were each sentenced to fourteen years in prison in October 2019.

Gothenburg Bandidos president Johnson Bogere and his brother, former boxer Patrick Bogere, fled the country when they became sought by authorities for the kidnapping and torture of two men in western Sweden. After several months on the run, the pair were apprehended in Málaga, Spain in July 2019 and subsequently extradited to Sweden. In December 2019, Patrick Bogere was sentenced to five years' imprisonment and Johnson Bogere was sentenced to two years', while several others were also convicted in the case.

=== Bandidos–No Surrender gang war ===
A gang war involving the Bandidos and No Surrender in Östergötland County has resulted in several bombings and shootings. The conflict reportedly began as the Bandidos acted to prevent the newly arrived No Surrender from establishing a presence in the drug market. An explosion at a residential building in Linköping on 7 June 2019 is believed by police to be an attack by the Bandidos on a No Surrender member. Two No Surrender bikers, including a leading member, were shot dead outside a nightclub in Norrköping on 5 December 2019. Another No Surrender member was targeted in a bombing on 22 January 2020 in the Hageby area of Norrköping. On 9 April 2020, two No Surrender members were shot in a car outside a Norrköping fast food restaurant; one was killed and the other wounded.

== Switzerland ==
On 11 May 2019, Bandidos members clashed with members of the Zürich Hells Angels chapter and the Broncos – a Hells Angels support club from Bern – in Belp. A dozen Bandidos were celebrating a member's birthday when they were attacked by the Hells Angels, who summoned support from the Broncos, allegedly for wearing their colors at a motorcycle rally in nearby Murten earlier that day. Three men were injured, including one who needed emergency surgery after being shot in the chest. Thirty-four people were arrested.

== Thailand ==
The Bandidos operate seven chapters in Thailand. While membership is predominantly Thai, Australian, Danish and Swedish club members are also active in the country.

A Danish Bandidos member was shot and killed in Bangkok in July 1996. A member of the Hells Angels was subsequently imprisoned.

In June 1997, a woman was killed when a bomb exploded in the Bandidos headquarters in Bangkok.

Three Bandidos members – British nationals Peter Watkins-Jones and Crispin John Grandvil Papon-Smith, and Danish national Kim Lindegaard Nielsen – were arrested by the Department of Special Investigation (DSI) in Koh Samui in July 2006, suspected of money laundering and bribery. All major charges against the men were dropped due to a lack of sufficient evidence. Nielsen was instead sentenced eighteen months in prison for coercing another person to traffic in drugs.

During a crackdown on foreign gangs in the country launched by the Central Investigation Bureau (CIB) in 2014, Thai police stated that the Bandidos are active in Koh Samui and Phuket, where they are involved in illegal land development.

Australian Bandidos member Derek Paul Gibson and a Dutch national, Adrianus van Gool, were arrested in Chiang Mai and charged with extortion and attempting violence in March 2017 after another Australian man informed police that the pair were threatening to kill his family over unpaid debt-recovery fees.

== United Kingdom ==
On Thursday 12 May 2022, Devon and Cornwall Police were called to a collision on the on slip road of the A38 at St Budeaux in Plymouth, Devon. 59-year-old David Crawford, from Ivybridge in Devon, died at the scene. Crawford was riding a black Kawasaki motorcycle when he was driven over by Benjamin Parry, an "active member" of the Bandidos Motorcycle Club, who was driving a Ford Transit van owned by his employer. Crawford, a member of the Red Chiefs Motorcycle Club, was dragged underneath the van for nearly a kilometre on the A38 at Plymouth. Parry, along with two other Bandidos members, were subsequently arrested and put on trial for murder by joint enterprise.

On 28 November 2022, a jury cleared Parry of the murder charge at Plymouth Crown Court. Since he had already entered a guilty plea for manslaughter, he will be sentenced for that lesser charge. The following day, the jury found the other two Bandidos members guilty of manslaughter, by a majority verdict of eleven to one.

All three appeared in Exeter Crown Court for sentencing on 13 January 2023. Benjamin Parry was jailed for 12 years and was told he would serve a minimum of 8 years. The other two Bandidos members were jailed for 4 years each, with the requirement to serve 2 years.

== United States ==
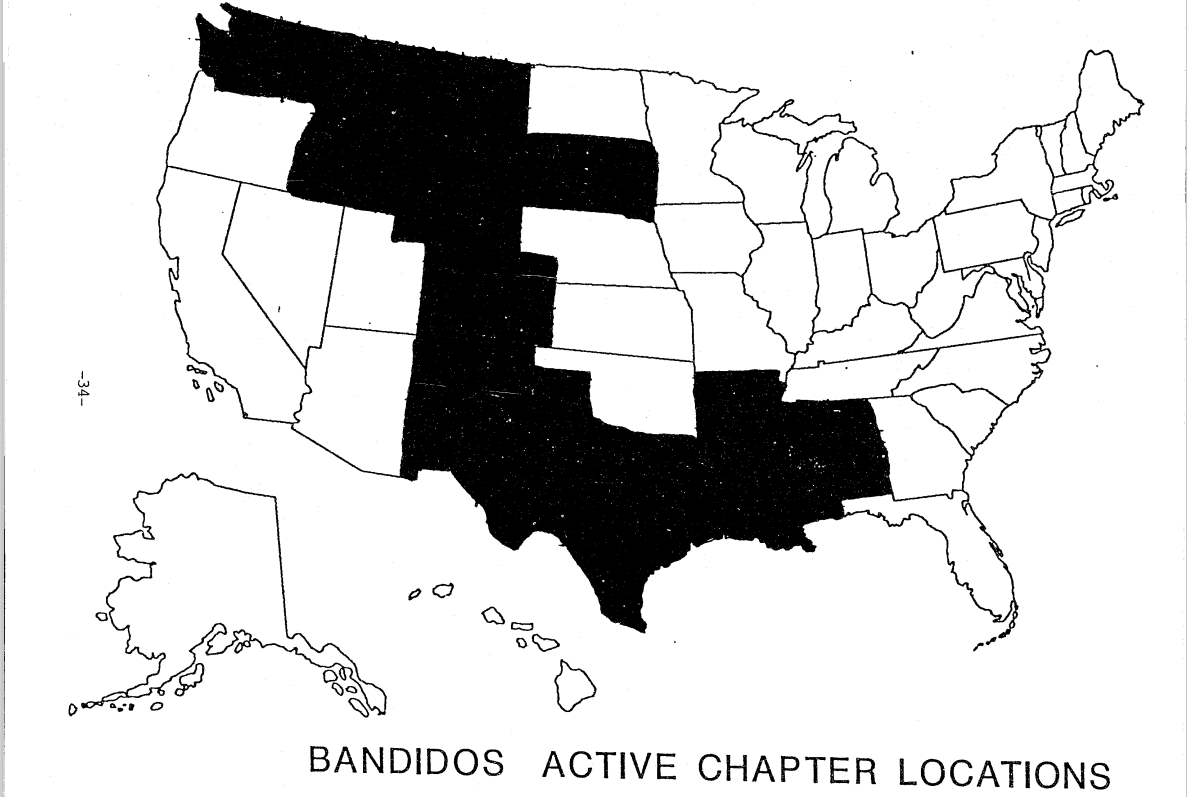
A map showing locations of Bandidos chapters in the United States circa 1991.

The Bandidos have been designated an outlaw motorcycle gang by the U.S. Department of Justice. The club is involved in drug trafficking, weapons trafficking, prostitution, money laundering, explosives violations, motorcycle and motorcycle-parts theft, intimidation, insurance fraud, kidnapping, robbery, theft, stolen property, counterfeiting, contraband smuggling, murder, bombings, extortion, arson and assault. The Bandidos partake in transporting and distributing cocaine and marijuana, and the production, transportation and distribution of methamphetamine. Active primarily in the Northwestern, Southeastern, Southwestern and the West Central regions, there are an estimated 800 to 1,000 Bandidos members and 93 chapters in 16 U.S. states. Club membership is predominantly white and Hispanic. The Bandidos are supplied with drugs by Los Zetas, and have also associated with the Outlaws in criminal ventures. The Bandidos' rivals include the Cossacks, the Hells Angels, the Mongols the Kinfolk, and the Vagos.

== See also ==
- Hells Angels MC criminal allegations and incidents
- Mongols MC criminal allegations and incidents
