= Chicanos Motorcycle Club =

International outlaw motorcycle club

Chicanos MC
- Abbreviation: CMC
- Founded: 23 August 2003; 23 years ago
- Founded at: Pritzwalk, Germany
- Type: Outlaw motorcycle club
- Purpose: Support club for the Bandidos
- Region served: Germany, Netherlands, Norway, Russia, Serbia, Sweden, Ukraine, UAE

The Chicanos Motorcycle Club is an international outlaw motorcycle club that was founded in Pritzwalk, Germany on 23 August 2003. The Chicanos are a support club (called puppet clubs by law enforcement) for the Bandidos.

The Chicanos' colors are red and gold. Like all Bandidos support clubs, the lettering on the patch is gold on red, contrasting the Bandidos' red on gold. The club insignia consists of two crossed sabres. Following its founding in Germany in 2003, the club subsequently opened chapters in the Netherlands, Norway, Russia, Serbia, Sweden, Ukraine and the United Arab Emirates.

== Germany ==
Chicanos and Bandidos members were involved in a large brawl with an Arab criminal family in Reinickendorf on 6 August 2007 which resulted in a biker and two Arabs being injured, one seriously. Baseball bats, machetes and knives were used in the confrontation, which escalated from a verbal disagreement. Four bikers were arrested and Spezialeinsatzkommando (SEK) was deployed during the subsequent investigation, which included a search of a clubhouse.

Chicanos members assaulted the president of the Hells Angels' nomads chapter in a nightclub in Eberswalde on 6 December 2008. On 5 June 2009, members of the Hells Angels-affiliated Brigade 81 raided the Chicanos' clubhouse in Ludwigsfelde, leaving several club members injured. Chicanos and Hells Angels were involved in a car chase in Schorfheide on 21 June 2009, which ended with four members of the Hells Angels nomads suffering injuries, including the chapter president who was stabbed in the back and almost lost a leg due to an axe attack. On 17 July 2009, a homemade bomb was discovered underneath a car belonging to a Chicanos chapter president in Eberswalde. Other incidents that year include a fight between Chicanos and Hells Angels in Rendsburg that left a man seriously injured, and an incident in which Chicanos fired shots at the home of a Hells Angels member in Neumunster. In May 2010, police prevented a potentially violent clash between the Chicanos' "South Central" chapter and the Hells Angels in Neukölln, Berlin when they intervened shortly before a confrontation between the two armed groups. Baseball bats and bladed weapons were seized from arrested Hells Angels.

Jörg Schönbohm, interior minister for the state of Brandenburg, outlawed the Barnim Chicanos chapter on 24 August 2009. The chapter, founded in February that year, had 14 members, few of whom owned motorcycles. Weapons including swords, pistols, cudgels and brass knuckles – which were used to exert influence in the bouncer and drug scene in the region – were confiscated by police during searches of the clubhouse and members' homes.

Members of the Chicanos and the Underdogs Motorcycle Club fought in the street in Halle city center on 26 October 2010. Around twenty participants were involved, armed with firearms, Molotov cocktails and cobblestones. On 2 May 2012, the president of the Chicanos' Halle chapter shot the Underdogs Halle president several times from a car. The Underdogs member was saved by emergency surgery. Chicanos and Underdogs clashed at a party in Weißenfels on 26 August 2012, resulting in two Underdogs members from Saalkreis suffering non-serious stab wounds. In June 2013, a member of District 61 – a group comprised partially of former Underdogs members – shot in self-defense at two Chicanos members in Halle city center, although nobody was wounded. One of the two Chicanos was later shot and wounded by a member of the Underdogs in Halle in May 2014.

Chicanos chapters in Aachen, Alsdorf and Düren, along with the Aachen Bandidos, were banned by the ministry of SPD MP Ralf Jäger on 26 April 2012. Over six-hundred police officers were involved in subsequent raids on the chapters' headquarters and members' residences. A search of the Alsdorf chapter clubhouse resulted in the seizure of club regalia, firearms, bladed weapons and a police scanner.

A nationwide ban on wearing the emblems of the Chicanos and eight other motorcycle clubs in public came into effect on 16 March 2017.

== Netherlands ==
An investigation into the Limburg Bandidos chapter in January 2016 revealed that an associated Chicanos branch, which was founded by the Bandidos' vice-president, provided recruits and engaged in threats, drug offenses and violent crimes on the Bandidos' behalf.

== Norway ==
The National Criminal Investigation Service (NCIS, or Kripos) has designated the Chicanos a criminal group. The first Chicanos chapter in Norway was formed in 2013 with assistance from the club's Swedish branch.

== Sweden ==
Sweden's first Chicanos branch opened in Vänersborg in 2012, with a patch-over of a No Surrender chapter. Several other Chicanos chapters were subsequently formed in the country, and the Vänersborg original chapter patched over to the Bandidos in 2016.

Four members were arrested on suspicion of extortion in February 2013, and subsequent searches of the men's homes resulted in a number of other charges. In late 2012, Chicanos members extorted kr5,000 from a man who had been selling drugs in Mellerud, which the club considered their territory. In April 2013, three were convicted of assault, extortion, theft and drug offences, including the chapter president, who was sentenced to one-year-and-a-half in prison.

The Chicanos in Dalsland became involved in a conflict with the Black Cobra gang after attempting to recruit Black Cobra members. On 5 April 2013, members of the Chicanos and Black Cobra rioted in Trollhättan

The president of the Sandviken Chicanos chapter was convicted of minor drug crimes and unlawful driving on 1 October 2015.

In October 2017, three Norwegian citizens – two men, one of whom was a member of the Chicanos in Norway, and a woman – were convicted of driving a man into the woods, beating him and sodomizing him with a tree branch, in an assault related to extortion, in Värmland in July 2017. Both men were sentenced to four years' imprisonment, while the woman was sentenced to two years'.

The Chicanos' clubhouse in Sandviken was set alight in a suspected arson attack on 21 November 2018.
