= Marko Hirsma =

Finnish musician and outlaw biker (1965–2001)

- Born: Marko Asser Hirsma; 12 July 1965; Helsinki, Finland
- Died: 20 October 2001 (aged 36); Helsinki, Finland
- Cause of death: Murder (gunshot wounds)
- Occupations: Outlaw biker, gangster, musician
- Known for: National president of the Bandidos in Finland
- Allegiance: Overkill MC (–1994); Undertakers MC (1994–1996); Bandidos MC (1996–1999)

Marko Asser Hirsma (12 July 1965 – 20 October 2001) was a Finnish musician, outlaw biker and gangster who served as the first national president of the Bandidos Motorcycle Club in Finland.

== Outlaw biker ==
Hirsma was the singer-bassist in the Backsliders, a rock band that, between 1985 and 1994, managed to release five studio albums and one cover album together with Albert Järvinen under the name Flashbacksliders. The Backsliders' activities waned in the 1990s, when Hirsma became gradually more involved in gang activity. He was a member of the Overkill Motorcycle Club, which vied with the Iron Hog MC for the right to become a candidate for the Hells Angels' first Finnish chapter. During the power struggle, the Iron Hog president was severely beaten on 9 February 1993 and his club subsequently withdrew. This was followed by a high-profile police raid on Overkill's headquarters on 3 March 1993. A few weeks before Overkill became a probationary Hells Angels chapter in 1994, Hirsma was beaten at a Hells Angels party in Sweden where he was working as a bar tender. The reasons behind the beating are unknown. He resigned from the club and founded the Undertakers MC in August 1994. The Undertakers applied for membership in the Bandidos and became a probationary chapter in August 1995 before being "patched over" in October 1996. Hirsma was appointed the Bandidos' national president.

Between 1995 and 1997, the Bandidos and Hells Angels fought a turf war in Finland in connection with the wider Nordic Biker War. On 27 September 1995, Hirsma was assaulted by members of the Hells Angels and Cannonball MC – a Hells Angels-affiliated club – outside a Helsinki courthouse where he was attending the trial of Kai Tapio Blom and Antti Tauno Tapani, two Bandidos convicted of an anti-tank rocket attack on the Hells Angels' clubhouse two months before. He was sentenced to over a year in prison in June 1996 for firearms offenses and the August 1995 theft of a Hells Angel's colors. Hirsma was sentenced to an additional nine months in prison on 12 July 1996 after being convicted of inciting a Bandidos underling to throw a grenade into the Hells Angels' clubhouse on 18 May 1996. The attack was carried out as retaliation for the murder of Bandidos vice-president Jarkko Kokko, who died on 17 March 1996, sixteen days after being shot by suspected Hells Angels members. In November 1996, Hirsma was attacked and beaten in Sörkka Prison amidst a struggle for control of the prison drug trade fought between the Bandidos and a rival group. Hostilities between the Bandidos and Hells Angels came to an end in September 1997 when a truce between both groups was brokered. Since the end of the biker war, the once-rival clubs have operated in parallel rather than competing with each other.

== Murder ==
After his release from prison, Hirsma's behavior grew more violent. His irrational behavior would later be believed to be the result of a fractured skull he suffered in prison. During 1999, the Bandidos in Finland came close to disbanding due to an internal feud concerning Hirsma's leadership. The club had just seven members at the time – four of whom were imprisoned – and reinforcements were required from Norway and Denmark. Hirsma was eventually expelled from the club after he criticized how the club was run in Europe during a Bandidos world meeting in the United States. He went on to reestablish the Undertakers and was also in contact with the Outlaws. Hirsma was subjected to continued violence by his former club; he was beaten and robbed of his motorcycle by Bandidos in Germany in the spring of 2000, and a Bandidos member strafed his home with submachine gun fire in the autumn of that year. On 20 October 2001, Hirsma was killed in front of his home in Helsinki during an exchange of gunfire with his former clubmates Kai Tapio Blom and Andrei Antoni Jensko, both recently paroled from prison. On 11 March 2002, Blom and Jesko were convicted of murdering Hirsma, attempting to murder his wife and endangering several bystanders including Hirsma's child; they were sentenced to life in prison and ordered to pay Hirsma's widow and child a total of more than 50,000 euro in compensation for non-material damage.

== See also ==
- Bandidos MC in Finland
