= Tribe of Judah Motorcycle Ministries =

Christian ministry

- Abbreviation: ToJMM
- Formation: 1984
- Type: Evangelical Christian Ministry
- Purpose: Evangelism
- Headquarters: Houston, Texas, USA
- Founder/International President: Ben Priest
- Website: Official website

The Tribe of Judah Motorcycle Ministries (ToJMM) is an evangelical Christian outreach aimed at "reaching the outlaw biker world and people in all walks of life". The ministry was founded by Ben Priest in 1984, members celebrated its 25 year anniversary at a reunion in Colorado in 2009.

Members of the Tribe of Judah MM attend motorcycle events and rallies to serve and evangelise to the outlaw motorcycle community. They ride American made V-twin motorcycles such as Harley-Davidson's and wear a 3-piece back-patch similar to those worn by members of traditional outlaw motorcycle clubs.

== History ==
The Tribe of Judah MM was founded in 1984 by Ben Priest. According to Priest's personal testimony he was formerly addicted to illicit drugs and a member of an outlaw motorcycle club. In 1980 Priest underwent a conversion experience after attempting to commit suicide by drug overdose. Priest reports a personal encounter with Jesus Christ and details experiences which comply with what charismatic and pentecostal Christians would describe as Spirit baptism and the practice of speaking in tongues. Priest later formed the Tribe of Judah MM as a means to spread the Christian gospel amongst the biker community he had once been a part of.

== Membership ==
There are currently 56 Tribe of Judah MM chapters in 19 US states and 9 further countries in Europe, Australia and North America.

Membership (full patch) of the Tribe of Judah MM is awarded following a hang around time, time of being a Millennium Messenger and a lengthy prospecting period, in some ways similar to that undergone by prospective members of an outlaw motorcycle club. In the Tribe of Judah full-patch members are considered to be ministers and the prospecting period is seen as a form of ministry training. Prior to becoming a prospect those wishing to join the Tribe of Judah MM are expected to spend some time as a Millennium Messenger, committing to support the ministry both in prayer and financially.

=== Millennium Messengers & Harvest Partners ===
Harvest Partners provide support for the Tribe of Judah in prayer and financially.

Millennium Messengers are also committed to provide support through prayer and finances to the Tribe of Judah MM. Additionally, Millennium Messengers may attend some outreaches and biker events, displaying a single-piece Millennium Messengers patch to show their support for the Tribe of Judah. Becoming a Millennium Messenger is also the first step involved in becoming a full member of the Tribe of Judah.

Neither Harvest Partners or Millennium Messengers are required to own or ride a motorcycle.

=== Patch ===
Members of the Tribe of Judah wear a 3-piece patch, similar to those worn by members of traditional outlaw motorcycle clubs. The ToJMM patch differs from motorcycle club patches in a number of ways:

1. The Tribe of Judah wear an "MM" patch (which stands for Motorcycle Ministry) rather than the "MC" patch worn by members of an outlaw motorcycle club.
2. The Tribe of Judah are non-territorial and do not wear territory rockers or bars. The bottom rocker of the back-patch (where MC members traditionally wear a territory rocker) instead states "Jesus is Lord".

The centre piece of the Tribe of Judah patch is the Christian cross. Tribe of Judah MM prospects wear only the bottom rocker of the back-patch.

== Reception and influence ==
The Tribe of Judah MM have been a part of the international motorcycle community for over three decades and are considered by some to be an accepted and respected part of this society. The freedom they have to wear their patches publicly at large motorcycle events and rallies, often socialising amongst members of established outlaw motorcycle clubs and one-percenter groups, could be argued to be highly indicative of this fact. Conversely, some members report to have received aggressive responses from others in the motorcycle community, perhaps indicating that this positive reception is not universal.
