= Diablos Motorcycle Club (founded 1999) =

International outlaw motorcycle club

Diablos MC
- Founded: 1999; 27 years ago
- Founded at: Pattaya, Thailand
- Type: Outlaw motorcycle club
- Purpose: Support club for the Bandidos
- Region served: Australia, Belgium, Finland, Germany, Indonesia, Kazakhstan, Laos, Singapore, Sweden, Thailand, Philippines, UAE and Ukraine

The Diablos Motorcycle Club is an international outlaw motorcycle club that was founded in Pattaya, Thailand, in 1999. The Diablos are a support club (called puppet clubs by law enforcement) for the Bandidos.

The Diablos' colors are red and gold. Like all Bandidos support clubs, the lettering on the patch is gold on red, contrasting the Bandidos' red on gold. The club insignia consists of a maliciously grinning devil's head.

== Branches ==
Since the foundation of the first chapter in Thailand in 1999, branches in other Asian countries have also been formed, including Indonesia, Kazakhstan, Laos, Singapore and the United Arab Emirates. In 2000, the club expanded to Europe, and chapters in Belgium and Germany were founded. Branches opened in Sweden and Finland the following year. The club was established in Australia in 2014.

== Incidents ==
=== Australia ===
Members of the Hells Angels and associated clubs raided the Diablos' clubhouse in Melton, Melbourne, on 1 March 2013, according to the Sydney Morning Herald "bashing" a Diablos member and taking identification details of the Diablos' girlfriends at gunpoint as a threat to stop them reporting the attack to police. Approximately thirty minutes after the assault began, Bandidos members arrived in four cars in response to the raid. The Hells Angels group set up their own ambush, ramming a car driven by Bandidos national sergeant-at-arms Toby Mitchell and firing around thirty shots. Mitchell was shot in the right arm and another Bandido received a minor gunshot wound.

=== Finland ===
The National Bureau of Investigation has designated the Diablos a criminal organization.

Police conducted a search of the Diablos' clubhouse in Oulu on 18 October 2011 due to a serious criminal suspicion. The chapter president was arrested during the raid.

Diablos member Timothy Stuart Robinson shot and wounded a man in the buttocks in a restaurant in Oulu on 24 May 2012. Robinson was arrested in the vicinity of the restaurant shortly after the crime. In September 2012, Robinson was convicted of aggravated assault, aggravated robbery, assault and a firearms offence, and was sentenced to 4 1/2 years in prison. In addition to the shooting, he, along with another man, committed a gross robbery at the beginning of the same month during which the duo beat the victim with a metal baseball bat and an iron pipe.

In January 2015, a total of eight people, some of whom were members of the Bandidos and X-Team, were given prison sentences of various lengths for the violent extortion of a man in Oulu that took place in July 2014. According to the district court, the events originated when the Diablos chapter in Varkaus asked Bandidos' Oulu branch to collect the debt.

=== Germany ===
The Diablos chapter in Heinsberg, along with the Aachen Bandidos chapter, was banned by the ministry of SPD MP Ralf Jäger on 26 April 2012.

A nationwide ban on wearing the emblems of the Diablos and seven other motorcycle clubs in public came into effect on 16 March 2017.

=== Sweden ===
Two members were arrested at the Diablos' clubhouse in Malmö on 22 August 2002 following an assault at a nightclub which left three people injured.

Police raided the Diablos' clubhouse in Toftanäs, Malmö, on 25 February 2006, seizing amphetamine and drug paraphernalia. Police also found several firearms, including two automatic guns with ammunition, during a search of the chapter president's home. On 10 May 2006, the chapter president was sentenced to eight months' imprisonment for firearms offences.

Police arrested six people for drug offences following an operation at the club's Malmö headquarters on 27 June 2007.

Eight members were arrested after police found quantities of weapons and narcotics during another raid on the Diablos' clubhouse in Malmö on 23 January 2008.
