= Cannonball Motorcycle Club =

Outlaw motorcycle club in Finland and Estonia

Cannonball MC
- Abbreviation: CMC
- Founded: May 1991; 35 years ago
- Founder: Jari Uotila
- Founded at: Helsinki, Finland
- Type: Outlaw motorcycle club
- Region served: Finland and Estonia
- Members: 230
- Website: www.cannonballmc.eu

The Cannonball Motorcycle Club (CMC) is an outlaw motorcycle club in Finland and Estonia. Founded in Helsinki in 1991, the club has eleven chapters and a membership of over two-hundred. Cannonball MC is designated as an organized crime group by the National Bureau of Investigation (NBI).The club's name is derived from the Cannonball Run challenge.

== History ==
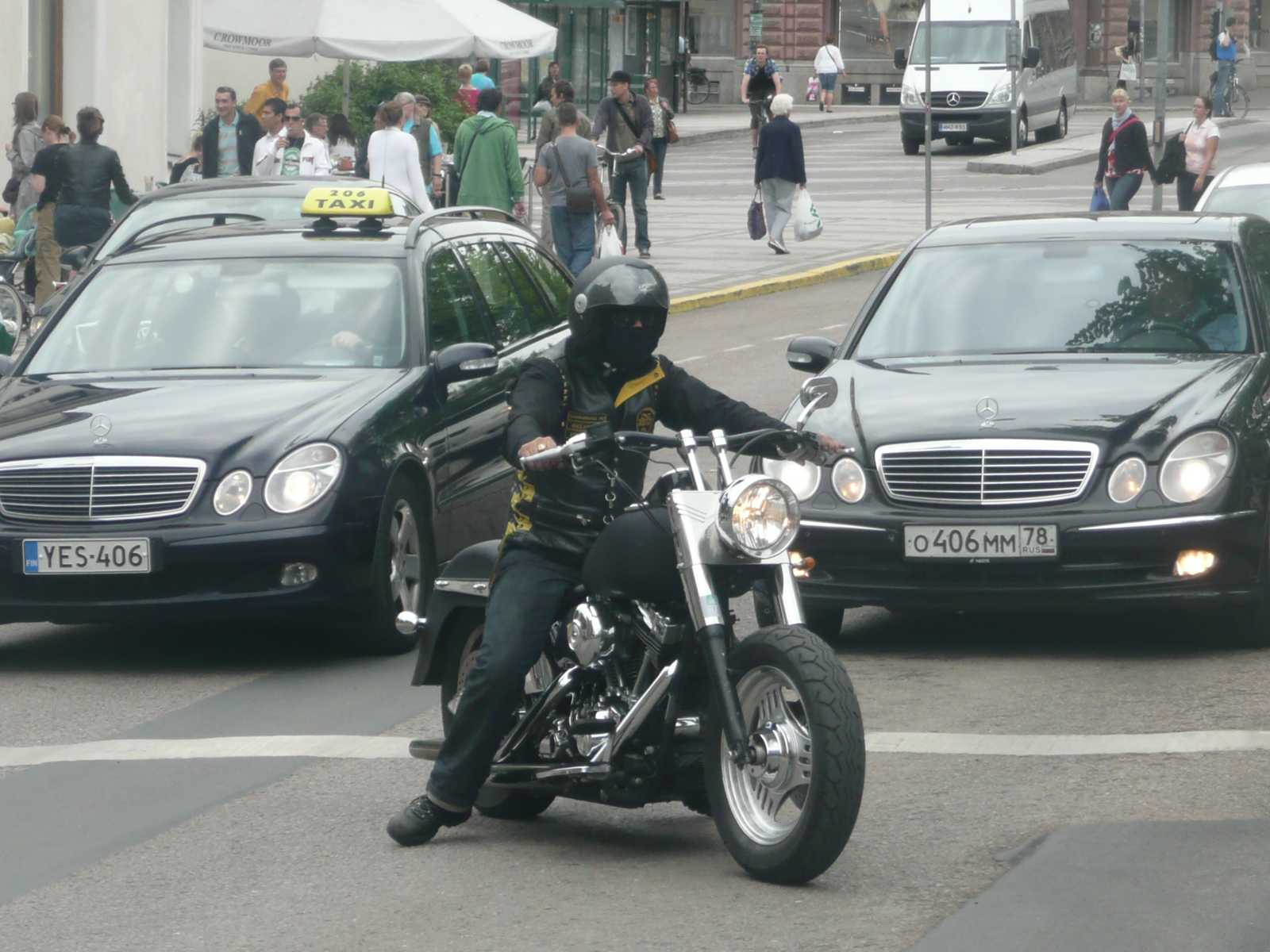
A Cannonball member in Helsinki.

The Cannonball Motorcycle Club was formed by Jari Uotila in Helsinki in May 1991. The club's name is derived from the Cannonball Run challenge. During the initial five years of its existence, Cannonball MC operated as a support club of the Hells Angels. The affiliation ended in 1996 and Cannonball instead proceeded as an independent motorcycle club. The club went on to establish ten chapters throughout Finland – in Helsinki, Lohja, Turku, Jyväskylä, Heinola, Hämeenlinna, Seinäjoki, Ulvila, Joensuu and Kausala – and one in Tallinn, Estonia. Additionally, Cannonball's sub-division, Squad 32, has six branches. A Cannonball chapter in Lahti ceased operations in 1999 when its members resigned due to dissatisfaction with the activities of the parent club. The former members of this chapter then founded the Rogues Gallery gang in the city in January 2000.

Jari Uotila, Cannonball's founder and president, died from medical complications at the age of fifty-two on 23 April 2012.

It was reported in July 2017 that Cannonball MC had disbanded following an internal dispute. News broke in September 2017, however, that the dispute had been resolved and that the club would continue to operate in the same localities and with the same membership as before.

== Insignia ==
The logo of the Cannonball Motorcycle Club consists of a flaming cannonball accompanied by a Finnish war flag. Cannonball MC's colours are black and yellow. The club's motto is "Cannonball forever, forever Cannonball." ("CFFC").

== Membership and organization ==
Cannonball MC has a national and local hierarchy, with the internal organization of each chapter consisting of a president, vice-president, treasurer, road captain and sergeant-at-arms. These positions form each chapter's officer corps, to which other members are subordinate. Applicants for membership must be male, have the sponsorship of an existing club member and own, or at least have a firm intention to acquire, a motorcycle. A chapter president dictates the progress and membership status of the candidates based on the recommendations of the chapter's officers. Potential members begin their association with the club as a member of Squad 32, then after they own a motorcycle, as a "hangaround" member, and must be a "prospective" (trial member) before becoming a full member. Cannonball's bylaws dictate that, among other things, members must attend mandatory meetings and motorcycle rides. Members pay a monthly fee of €100. Upon leaving the club, members must return their colors and pay a severance fee of €15,000 or a motorcycle. The club has a membership of approximately two-hundred-and-thirty.

== Support and Supporters ==
The club has a strong and extensive support and supporters community. Supports typically wear clothing featuring the clubs insignia and symbols, such as Support 32 or Support CMC. Supporters typically consisting of the family and close friends of the club members, generally wear the Supporter Cannonball Motorcycle Club' logo.

== Criminal allegations and incidents ==
Cannonball MC is designated an organized crime group by the National Bureau of Investigation (NBI). The club has been linked to drug trafficking, financial crime and aggravated assault.

As a Hells Angels support club, Cannonball was aligned with the HA prospect chapter Overkill MC against the Undertakers MC, a prospect club of the Bandidos, during the Nordic Biker War in the 1990s. The Cannonball vice-president was shot and wounded by an Undertakers member at a restaurant in Helsinki on 1 April 1995. Two Undertakers bikers, including club president Marko Hirsma, were assaulted by members of Cannonball and Overkill on 27 September 1995 outside a courthouse in Pasila, Helsinki when they arrived to attend the court case of two other Undertakers who were on trial for attacking Overkill's clubhouse with a rocket-propelled grenade. In 1996, Overkill and the Undertakers patched over to the Hells Angels and Bandidos, respectively, while Cannonball became independent. The biker war formally concluded with a ceasefire on 25 September 1997. Since the end of the conflict, the clubs have operated in parallel rather than competing with each other.

Ari Petteri Ronkainen, a member of Cannonball's Helsinki chapter, was sentenced to 4 1/2 years in prison on 17 July 1997 for smuggling twenty kilograms of hashish into Finland from Spain.

On 19 October 1998, of three members and an associate of Cannonball's Lahti chapter, two were sentenced to two years and four months' imprisonment, and two to two years and two months' for extortion.

Three members of the Helsinki Cannonball chapter were convicted of extortion and given prison sentences of four years, two years, and 1 1/2 years on 30 April 1999.

On 23 July 1999, three members of Cannonball's Kouvola chapter were arrested on suspicion of planting a bomb in a restaurant in the city. Two of the bikers were convicted of attempted arson on 3 December 1999; one was sentenced to three years and eight months' imprisonment, and the other to two years and six months'.

Seven people, including a Cannonball chapter president, were charged on 24 August 2006 in relation to a drug distribution ring that was uncovered by the Oulu and Lahti police in April that year. Ten kilograms of amphetamine as well as cash and firearms was also seized.

Police in Helsinki and elsewhere in southern Finland arrested ten Cannonball members on suspicion of robbery and extortion on 14 February 2008. According to the NBI, the Cannonball members used intimidation and violence to take possession of cash, a car, motorcycles and motorcycle parts from ordinary motorcycle enthusiasts from Forssa and Loimaa. On 9 July 2008, a total of seventeen men were given sentences ranging from six years in prison to a three-month suspended sentence.

A conflict between current and former club members resulted in a shooting in Helsinki on 23 May 2011. Initially, two Cannonball members were convicted of attempted manslaughter, while the club's president Jari Uotila was acquitted at the Helsinki District Court. The District Court's decision was appealed to the Court of Appeal by the prosecutor, however. Uotila died from medical complications on 23 April 2012 amidst the appeals hearing. In October 2012, the Appeals Court upgraded the sentences of the two others to two years' and two years and ten months' imprisonment.

Cannonball members were among over a dozen people arrested for drugs and firearms offences during a series of raids carried out by local police and the NBI in the Greater Helsinki area and in Tallinn on 27 November 2012. Finnish and Estonian police cooperated during the investigation, which also resulted in the seizure of amphetamine.

Fifteen people – including eight members of Cannonball and the Bandidos – were given prison sentences ranging from five to thirteen years for drug offences on 28 June 2013 in a case relating to the importation of large quantities of amphetamines, hashish and MDMA into Finland from central Europe between 2011 and 2013. The smuggling operation, involving mainly Estonian nationals, was uncovered by the Finnish and Estonian National Bureaus of Investigation in April 2013.

Two full members of Cannonball MC'S Joensuu chapter were sentenced to imprisonment in February 2015 for threatening a man who had previously testified against them. The duo had assaulted the man and threatened to shoot him in December 2014.

On 27 February 2015, the Helsinki District Court sentenced four members of Cannonball MC to imprisonment of between sixty days and eight months for participating in an organized crime group. A total of twenty-two persons had been charged with participating in organised crime groups, aggravated tax fraud, aggravated alcohol offences, aggravated firearms offences, firearms offences, explosives offences, concealment offences and narcotics offences; organised crime charges were dropped against eighteen defendants, and all charges were dismissed against nine others.

Police carried out a search of the clubhouse of the Cannonball chapter in Seinäjoki on 18 March 2015, resulting in fifteen people being apprehended and the seizure of firearms and narcotics. According to the police, the search was based on a suspected firearms offence.

Five people were taken into custody after police carried out simultaneous raids on Cannonball's clubhouse and four residences in Helsinki on 2 June 2015. Authorities seized drugs and two unlicensed firearms among other items of interest. The amount of drugs found, holding an estimated street value of more than €28,000, exceeded by tenfold the criteria for aggravated drug offenses. Additionally, two of those detained were suspected by police of an illegal takeover of a construction company in 2014.

A Cannonball member was taken into custody after police raided the Hämeenlinna chapter clubhouse and discovered an unlicensed firearm and a small amount of suspected narcotics on 26 November 2015. The apprehension related to the criminal case on which the search was based, as well as the findings made during the search. In October 2016, the biker was sentenced to two years and seven months in prison for a number of offences, including aggravated drug offences and aggravated firearms offences.

On 14 April 2016, the Helsinki District Court sentenced a member of Cannonball MC's Tallinn chapter to one year and two months' unconditional imprisonment for a felony firearms offence. He had been found guilty of attempting to smuggle a submachine gun and gun parts from Estonia to Finland in January 2016 with the help of two others, who received suspended prison sentences of less than one year for the same crime.

An expelled member of the Lohja Cannonball MC chapter was taken to a sand pit in Siuntio and assaulted by his former clubmates in January 2017 after high-ranking members of the club attempted to recover money from him. On 29 June 2017, four Cannonball bikers were convicted of a number of offences, including aggravated assault, deprivation of liberty and attempted extortion, and another was acquitted. They were given prison sentences of between one and five years.

A Cannonball member and two hangarounds were among four people convicted on 31 March 2017 of firearms offences, aggravated assault, aggravated attempted extortion and unlawful threats relating to the shooting of a man in Lieto in October 2016. Each of the convicted were sentenced to two years' imprisonment.

Six people, including the president of Cannonball's Ulvila-based "Midwest" chapter, were sentenced to various prison terms on 12 July 2018 for aggravated drug offences. Additional charges included money laundering, fraud and firearms offences. Charges relating to the activities of organized crime groups were dropped due to lack of evidence. According to the Satakunta District Court, during 2017, the convicted persons distributed more than sixteen kilograms of amphetamines, approximately 6,000 MDMA tablets, 700 grams of MDMA powder, 200 grams of cocaine, 380 millilitres of amphetamine oil and 300 LSD tabs. The profits of the drug ring exceeded €370,000. In July 2019, the Court of Appeals increased the president's sentence from 4 1/2 years to eleven years, and upheld the ten-year sentence of the other main perpetrator in the case.

Thirteen people were convicted on 16 April 2019 in an amphetamine distribution case involving Cannonball MC. The offences took place between the summer of 2016 and the summer of 2017, mainly in the Hämeenlinna, Heinola and Janakkala areas. Timo Kalevi Tuomisto, Arttu Ilmari Heinonen and Tomi Juhani Kenttä received the longest prison sentences, at 10 1/2 years, eight years and ten months, and seven years, respectively. The sentences of all three were extended due to the fact that the court found them guilty of their crimes as part of the activities of an organized crime group. In addition, shorter prison sentences, suspended sentences and fines for various drug, violent and weapons offences were handed out in the case. In February 2020, the Court of Appeals in Eastern Finland increased Heinonen's sentence to ten years' and upheld all other sentences.

On 10 October 2019, thirteen people, including six who confessed to acting on behalf on Cannonball MC, were convicted in Helsinki of aggravated tax fraud and money laundering offences. The court handed down sentences ranging from community service to six months of unconditional imprisonment.

Nine motorcycle gang members were charged with various crimes, including attempted murder, after Cannonball members were involved in a shootout with rival bikers at the clubhouse of the Chosen Ones MC in Joensuu on 22 August 2020. A CMC member was wounded in the thigh during the shooting. Four members of the Chosen Ones and the allied Moraine MC were also charged in the case. On 5 March 2021, four Chosen Ones and Moraine members were each sentenced to four years and one month in prison for attempted murder, while three Cannonball members were sentenced to two years in prison for endangerment and other offences.

== Application to ban the biker club ==
On 20 October 2021 Finnish prosecutors filed an application to have the biker club Cannonball MC and its support-club Squad 32 permanently banned. The application seeks interim orders for immediate temporary ban. The country-wide ban for a biker club is with its scope a first in Finland, all previous attempts being limited to local chapters only. According to the application Cannonball MC has been continuously involved in criminal activities, “particularly trafficking of narcotics, extortion and robberies.” The representant for the club named in the application is the national leader Mr. Esko Eklund (DOB 1976) who is currently detained in relation to multiple narcotics offenses arising from the global ANOM sting known as Operation Trojan Shield.

== See also ==
- List of outlaw motorcycle clubs
- Organized crime in Finland
