= Rudi Heinz Elten =

German gangster (1977–2009)

- Born: 24 June 1977; Bottrop, West Germany
- Died: 10 August 2009 (aged 32); Duisburg, Germany
- Cause of death: Shooting
- Other name: "Eschli"
- Occupations: Pimp, debt collector
- Allegiance: Bandidos MC

Rudi Heinz Elten (24 June 1977 – 8 October 2009), nicknamed "Eschli", was a German outlaw biker, gangster and member of the Bandidos Motorcycle Club. Elten was shot dead in Duisburg on 8 October 2009 by Timur Akbulut, a prospective member of the rival Hells Angels Motorcycle Club.

== Background ==
Elten was part of the hooligan scene around FC Schalke 04 and had previous criminal convictions for robbery, extortion, breach of the peace, bodily harm and threat. He worked as a bouncer and debt collector, among other things, and began a career as a pimp around the same time as he joined the Bandidos. Officially registered as unemployed, he acted as an agent for prostitutes and operated from a brothel. Elten had a reputation in the biker scene for being violent and difficult to control.

== Death and subsequent legal case ==
On 8 October 2009, Timur Akbulut, a Turkish professional mixed martial artist and Hells Angels prospect, was travelling in a car with his older brother and was stopped at a red light near the Bandidos clubhouse in Duisburg when he was recognized by Elten. The men had been involved in previous disputes. Elten began to provoke his rival, even after Akbulut had drawn a gun. According to witness testimony, he is said to have called "Na komm, mach, schieß doch!" ("Come on, do it, shoot!"). Akbulut fired four shots, with one of them hitting Elten in the head. Two uninvolved women were narrowly missed by ricocheting bullets. Akbulut and his brother fled the scene, and he turned himself into police the following day. Elten later died in the emergency room.

Elten's funeral took place in Gelsenkirchen on 16 October 2009, with around 1,500 Bandidos members from across Europe attending the funeral service. The accompanying police operation in place to prevent further violent clashes between the rival biker groups cost around €600,000.

Akbulut was convicted of manslaughter over Elten's killing and was sentenced to eleven years in prison on 30 August 2010. The court denied Akbulut's claim of self-defense and considered it proven that the perpetrator only shot so as not to lose face. According to the judges, Elten's death was caused unintentionally and there was an absence of premeditation. The process took place under massive security precautions. Representatives of both clubs attended the trial and had to be shielded from one another by the police.

== Aftermath ==
Elten's killing came during a period of relative peace between the Bandidos and Hells Angels, who had been involved in a gang war since around 2004. Delegates from both clubs had met at a Magdeburg hotel on 10 December 2008 to discuss a peace treaty but no agreement could be concluded. A renewed upsurge in gang violence ensued following Elten's death, especially in Duisburg. Around fifty Hells Angels armed with clubs stormed a bar frequented by Bandidos in Duisburg's red-light district on 31 October 2009, leaving the bar destroyed and several people injured. Around a hundred police officers were needed to stop the violence. Several hours later, a hand grenade was thrown through the window of a Hells Angels clubhouse in Solingen. The grenade failed to explode, and police later detonated the device in a controlled explosion. Mutual attacks on the respective clubhouses of the groups were carried out on 17 May 2010, whereby the police could not intervene given the number of violent bikers on both sides. In the course of these developments, the special commission for motorcycle gang crime in North Rhine-Westphalia was expanded.

== See also ==
- Bandidos MC in Germany
