= No Surrender Motorcycle Club =

International outlaw motorcycle club

No Surrender MC
- Founded: 2013
- Founded by: Klaas Otto
- Founding location: Zundert, the Netherlands
- Territory: Netherlands, Australia, Belgium, Bosnia-Herzegovina, Canada, France, Georgia, Germany, Italy, Lebanon, Morocco, New Zealand, Norway, Russia, Serbia, Spain, Suriname, Sweden, Thailand, Turkey, United Kingdom, United States, Kurdistan-Rojava
- Ethnicity: Multiethnic; in particular Dutch, Turkish, Italians , and Kurdish
- Membership (est.): over 15.000 worldwide
- Leader: Boss - Ömer E./ AllesKaputt /

No Surrender Motorcycle Club is an international one-percenter outlaw motorcycle club established in the Netherlands. No Surrender was founded in 2013 by Klaas Otto, a former member of the biker gang Satudarah. By 2014, the club claimed over 600 members, and membership exceeded 1,600 in 2022. Its leaders are mainly Dutch Travellers or of Turkish and Kurdish origin.

On 16 February 2016, Otto announced he had left the club.

In 2014, three members of the group were reported to have traveled to Iraq to fight alongside Kurdish forces in the war against the Islamic State, an act which is not in itself a crime, according to authorities in the Netherlands.

In June 2015, it was announced that one of the volunteers, Nomad Ron, had died in a traffic accident.

On 13 January 2017 the clubhouse in Emmen was raided by police. According to the authorities, the clubhouse was trading in hard and soft drugs. The club expanded to Canada, with members in Alberta/Quebec, and the national chapter in Peterborough, Ontario On 22 April 2022 the Supreme Court of the Netherlands reaffirmed previous 2019 and 2020 bans on No Surrender in the Netherlands, making it a permanent ban.

On 26 July 2022 an explosion occurred in the 's-Hertogenbosch residence of Gracia K., who had recently started dating former No Surrender leader Klaas Otto.
