= Mobshitters =

Outlaw motorcycle club in Australia

Mobshitters MC
- Abbreviation: MSMC
- Founded: 1970
- Founded at: Hurstville, New South Wales
- Type: Outlaw motorcycle club
- Region served: Australia

The Mobshitters Motorcycle Club, is a "one-percenter" outlaw motorcycle club in Australia with around four chapters.

== See also ==
- List of outlaw motorcycle clubs
- Criminal Law (Criminal Organisations Disruption) Amendment Act 2013
