= Kinfolk Motorcycle Club =

American outlaw motorcycle club

Kinfolk MC
- The patch logo of the Kinfolk Motorcycle Club
- Founded: 2016
- Founder: Chopper Dan
- Named after: Kinfolk, a term that refers to relatives or family
- Founding location: Bonham, Texas, U.S.
- Years active: 2016–present
- Territory: Texas, Nevada, Utah, Oklahoma, New York and Ontario (Canada)
- Rivals: Bandidos MC

The Kinfolk Motorcycle Club are an international "one-percenter" style outlaw motorcycle club, best known for their longstanding rivalry with the Bandidos Motorcycle Club. The club was formed in Texas in 2016 and has several chapters within the United States and at least one in Canada.

Additional chapters of the Kinfolk MC also exist in Asia, Europe, Australia and South America, although they are separate from the US club. As a whole, the club embraces the values that traditional clubs had and choose to create its own identity as an American 1% club.

== History ==
The Kinfolk Motorcycle Club was formed in 2016 by several outlaw motorcycle club members and bikers who had left the Bandidos MC and several other Clubs due to their disapproval in the leadership, calling it a "dictatorship". Those men along with several other men from various clubs looking for change and a return to more traditional values formed this new club. The remaining members of the Bandidos did not approve of their ex-members' departure and establishment of a new club, which has been the cause of much conflict between both groups.

== Criminal allegations and incidents ==
On March 4, 2016 Kinfolk MC member Dusty Childress was gunned down in Jones County, Texas, by Wesley Dale Mason, a member of the rival Bandidos MC. He was sentenced to life in prison for the murder.

On July 30, 2017, Kinfolk MC member Javier Gonzalez was sentenced on a murder charge in the shooting of Juan "Compa" Martinez Jr, a Bandido MC member in El Paso, Texas. Martinez, who was shot seven times, died days after the shooting. Three other men linked to the Bandidos were injured in the shooting.
