= Satudarah =

Dutch outlaw motorcycle club

Satudarah MC
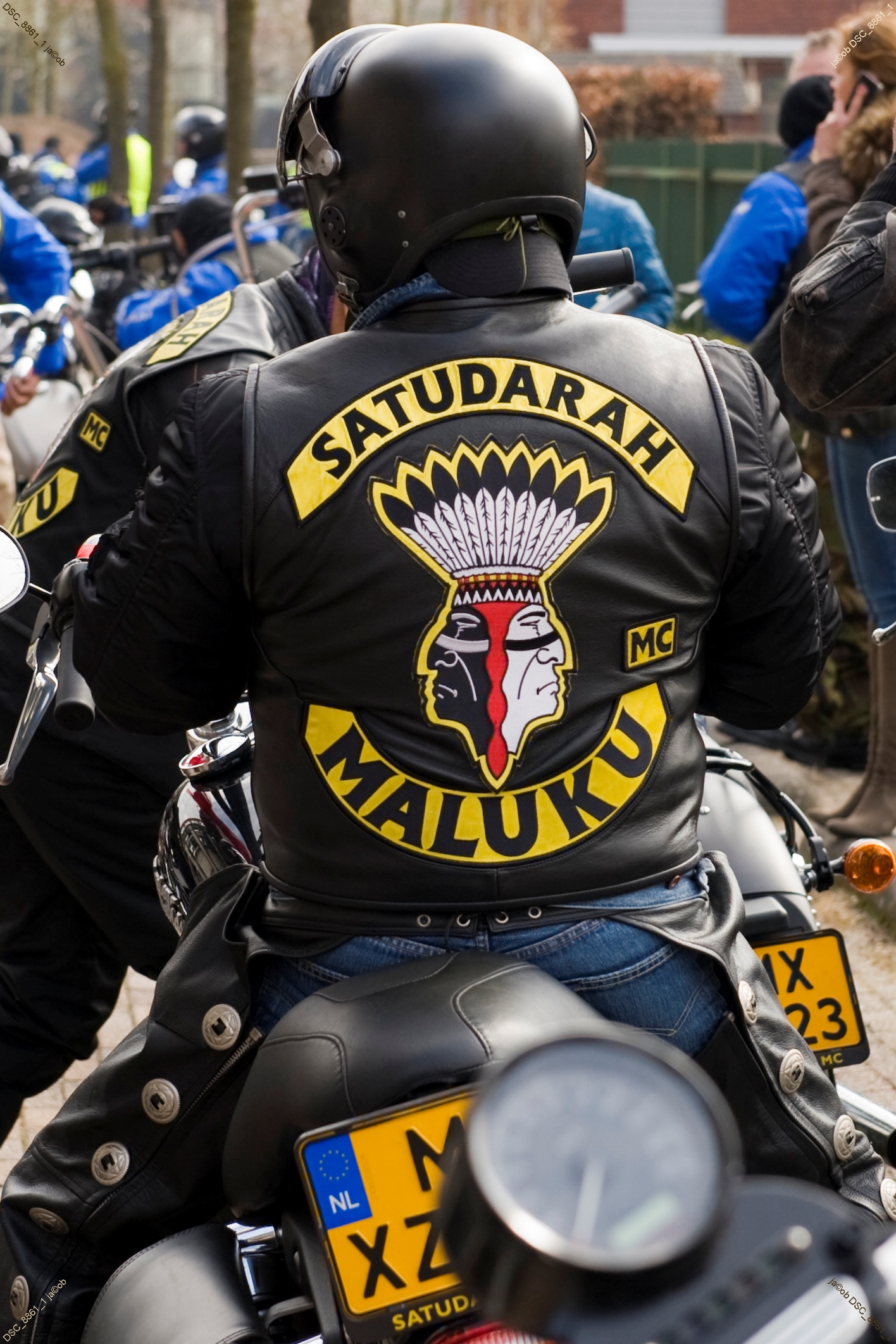
- Satudarah Motorcycle Club colors
- Founded: 1990
- Founding location: Moordrecht, the Netherlands
- Years active: 1990–present
- Territory: Netherlands, Australia, Austria, Belgium, Bosnia-Herzegovina, Brazil, Canada, Congo-Kinshasa, Curaçao, Denmark, England, Finland, France, Germany, Indonesia, Ireland, Malaysia, Namibia, New Zealand, Norway, Serbia, Singapore, South Africa, Spain, Suriname, Sweden, Switzerland, Thailand, Turkey, United States, Vietnam
- Ethnicity: Multiethnic; in particular Moluccan, Dutch, and Surinamese
- Membership (est.): 2,000+ worldwide

Satudarah MC is a one-percenter outlaw motorcycle club that was founded in 1990 in the Dutch town of Moordrecht. It was banned in the Netherlands on 18 June 2018, Members of the motorcycle club have frequently been tied to cases of violent crime, extortion, illegal drug trade, and arms trafficking.

== History ==
Satudarah MC was founded in 1990 by nine mainly Moluccan friends who lived in the Moluccan neighborhood of Moordrecht, South Holland. They had a penchant for motorcycling and called themselves the "heirs of the Moluccan warriors". As a result, an Alfur warrior is depicted on the club's logo, as is the mention of Maluku. The name satu darah means 'one blood' in Indonesian Malay and the club's colors are black and yellow.

In the summer of 2011, Satudarah appeared frequently in Dutch news, because motorcycle events in the Netherlands were called off out of fear that they would be used to fight a feud between the Dutch chapter of the Hells Angels and Satudarah. Both motorcycle clubs publicly denied this and subsequently organized their own events. The feared conflict did not materialize.

Satudarah MC established itself in Antwerp in 2012 under the name 'Satudarah Belgium District 9', where it operated in competition with the Belgian chapter of the Hells Angels.

In 2014, the Swedish chapter of Satudarah was disbanded after all its members were arrested for weapons possession and drug offences. In February 2015, the motorcycle club was banned by the German government, after which a national police action followed with searches and raids on clubhouses in Aachen and Duisburg, among others.

On 18 June 2018, the Dutch court in The Hague banned and dissolved Satudarah MC and two of its supporting organizations due to the threat to public order they presented. The club and its affiliates were no longer allowed to operate because of, among other reasons, their involvement in violent crime. In June 2019, the court's decision was confirmed on appeal. Cassation at the Supreme Court did not change matters either, resulting in Satudarah being definitively banned in the Netherlands.

=== Council of Eight ===
For many years, Satudarah MC was part of the so-called 'Council of Eight' (Dutch: Raad van Acht), a consultative body of all major motorcycle clubs in the Netherlands, intended to promote good understanding between the clubs. In early 2011, Satudarah MC was expelled from the council.

== International presence ==
Over the years, Satudarah MC has had 44 chapters throughout the Netherlands and chapters and affiliates in Australia, Austria, Belgium, Bosnia-Herzegovina, Brazil, Canada, Congo-Kinshasa, Curaçao, Denmark, Finland, France, Germany, Indonesia, Ireland, Malaysia, Namibia, New Zealand, Norway, Serbia, Singapore, South Africa, Spain, Suriname, Sweden, Switzerland, Thailand, Turkey, the United States, and Vietnam, Japan.

=== Australia ===
The national president of Satudarah, who is based in Melbourne, said in 2018 that chapters had been established in all Australian states, as well as a club in Canberra that had recently been patched over. The Sydney chapter had been shut down several years previously. In 2019, and reopened in 2024 splinter groups in Western Australia were said to be feuding with each other.

=== Netherlands ===
In the Netherlands, Satudarah MC had the reputation of being extremely violent and ruthless, more so than the local chapter of the Hells Angels. On 18 June 2018, the Dutch justice system announced a complete ban on the motorcycle club. The court imposed an immediate civil ban of all chapters and related clubs. Membership was originally mostly ethnic Moluccan (in particular Ambonese), but the club since included members of Dutch, Surinamese and other origins.
