= Nomad (motorcycle club membership) =

Outlaw motorcycle club member

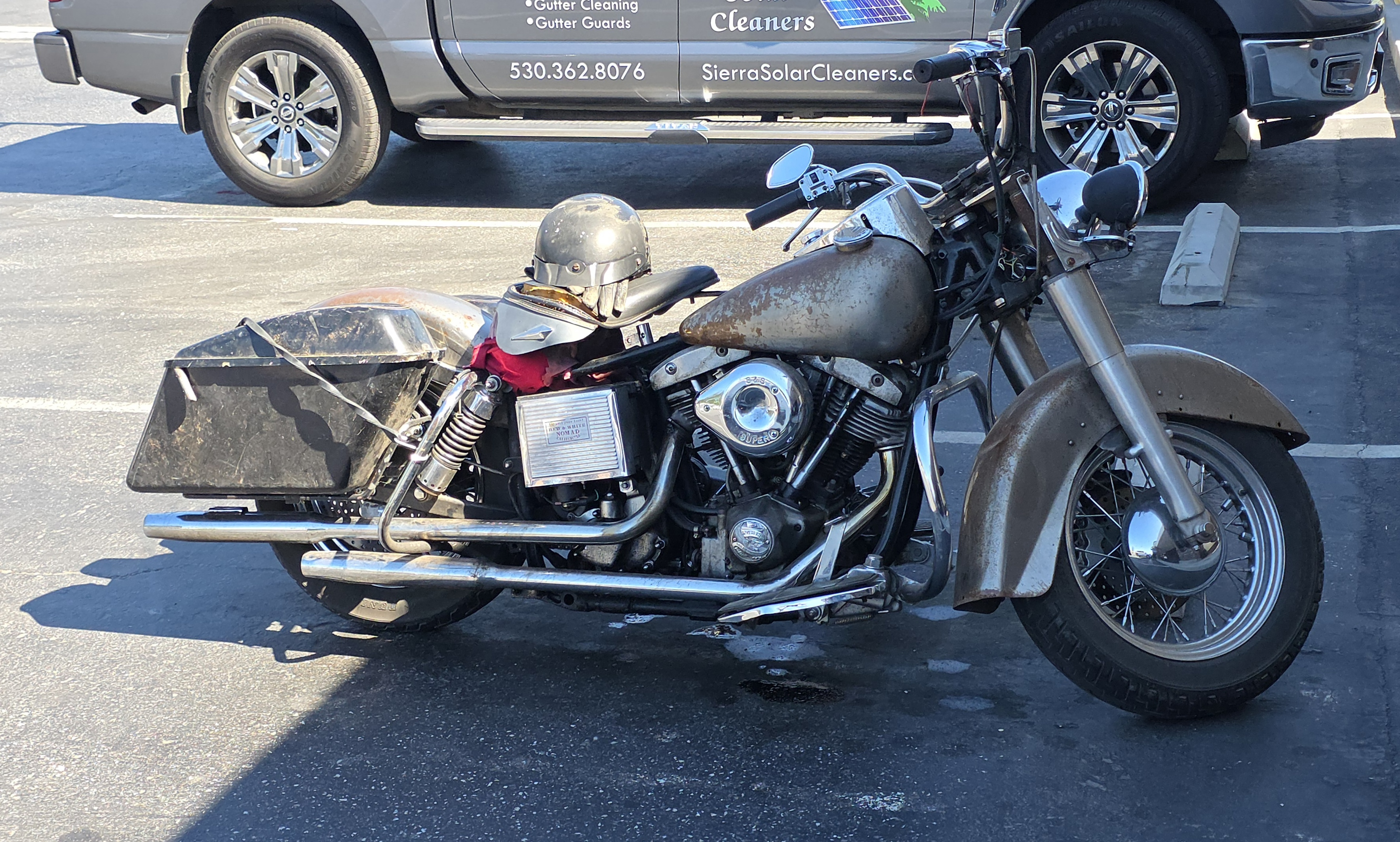
A motorcycle marked as owned by a nomad member of the Hells Angels Motorcycle Club, which is nicknamed "Red & White".

A nomad is a member of a motorcycle club (which may or may not be an outlaw motorcycle club) or similar club who is not a member of a specific charter of the group.

Some nomads live in areas that have fewer than the required numbers to form a charter. They may even have been sent to the area with a mandate to establish a chapter. Other nomads may have just chosen somewhat solitary lives.

While nomads are not members of a charter, they are respected and accepted widely by the club as full members. Whilst a nomad has the right to be hosted by any charter he appears at, he cannot direct a charter, as each one acts as an autonomous unit within the rules of the parent club.

Most motorcycle club members wear a territorial rocker (i.e., the bottom patch on the back of the jacket) that signifies what city/locale, state, or province their charter is located in. A nomad's territorial rocker, however, will simply say "Nomad" or "Nomads".

There are clubs named "Nomads Motorcycle Club" in several countries, such as the Australian Nomads, and clubs in South Africa and Germany.
