= Colors (motorcycling) =

Motorcycle club insignia

Sample layout of colors and patch meanings: 1) Club name 2) Club logo + MC (motorcycle club) patches 3) Country, territory, region, or city 4) "1%" patch identifying outlaw clubs 5) Special title(s), nickname(s), chapter name, charter name 6) Club office/rank 7) Side rocker – regional chapter name, charter name

Colors are the insignia, or "patches", worn by motorcycle club members on cut-off vests to identify membership of their club and territorial location. Club patches have been worn by many different groups since the 1960s. They are regarded by many to symbolize an elite amongst motorcyclists, and the style has been widely copied by other subcultures and commercialized.

Colors are considered to represent "significant markers of the socialization" of new members to clubs, rank and present a dominant symbol of identity and are marked with related symbolism. They can be embroidered patches sewn onto clothing or stenciled in paint, the primary symbol being the back patch of the club's insignia or logo and generally remain the property of the club. Wearing such clothing is referred to as "flying one's colors". The term has its roots in military history, originating with regimental colours.

== Meaning ==
Colors identify the rank of members within clubs from new members, to "prospects" to full members known as "patch-holders", and usually consist of a top and bottom circumferential badge called a rocker, due to the curved shape, with the top rocker stating the club name, the bottom rocker stating the location or territory, and a central logo of the club's insignia, with a fourth, smaller badge carrying the initials "MC" standing for "motorcycle club". Female clubs spell out "motorcycle club" on their vests.

The badges are used to create a social bond and boundaries and, generally, belong to the clubs involved rather than the individual wearing them. Although some clubs perform community or charitable service, individuals wearing colors may be refused service at related businesses and bars, and some biker bars have a "no colors" policy to reduce conflict. Claiming STATE territory by wearing a bottom STATE rocker can lead to violent conflict with a rival club, such as in the 2015 Waco shootout, which was partially caused by a club wearing a "Texas" bottom rocker.

Many motorcyclists wearing colors are from "family oriented" motorcycling clubs chartered by the American Motorcyclist Association and wear one-piece patches to differentiate themselves from the three-piece patches of 1% and outlaw bikers. These generally do not state a territorial location and can be any format other than a three piece patch. Coed clubs also break up the M and C to denote a difference. Cubes also denote a traditional MC. The motorcycle manufacturer Harley-Davidson notably adopted the style in its branding and community-building effort, the Harley Owners Group.

== "M.C." patch and variations ==
One of the most commonly displayed patches on motorcycle club colors is the patch of the letters "M C" which typically accompany the club name. There are several variations on this format with different letters that designate a specific type of club or group.

- M.F. = Motorcycle Family
- M.M. = Motorcycle Ministry
- R.C. = Riding Club
- W.M.C. = Women's Motorcycle Club

== Law and order colors and/or insignia ==
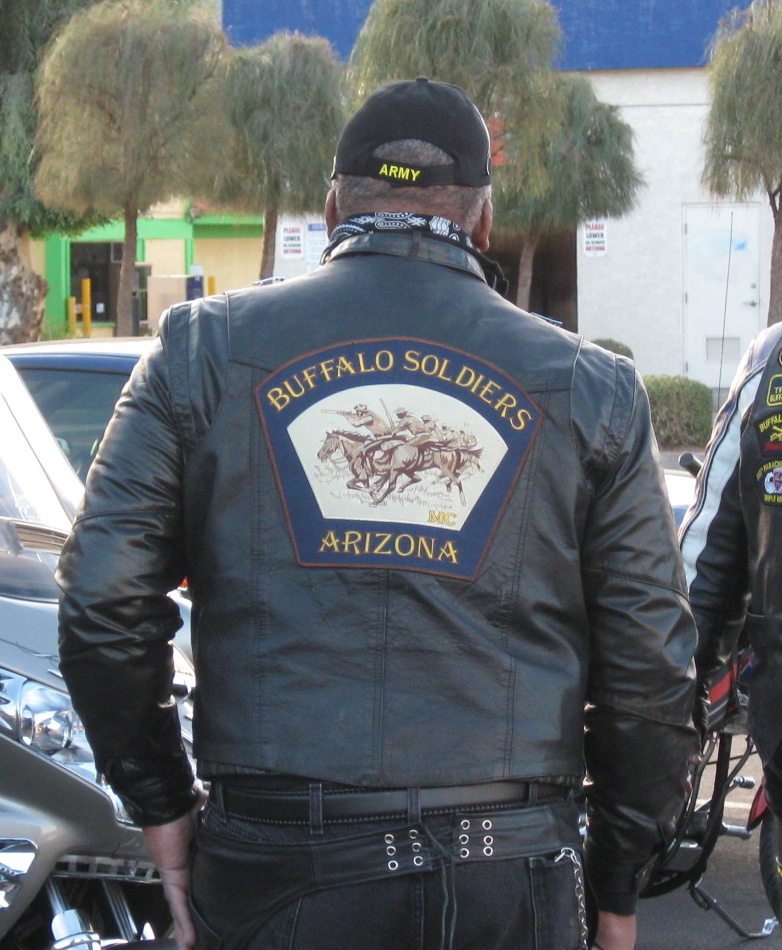
Buffalo Soldiers MC colors. The Buffalo Soldiers are named after the famed 10th Cavalry regiment of the United States Army, formed on 21 September 1866.

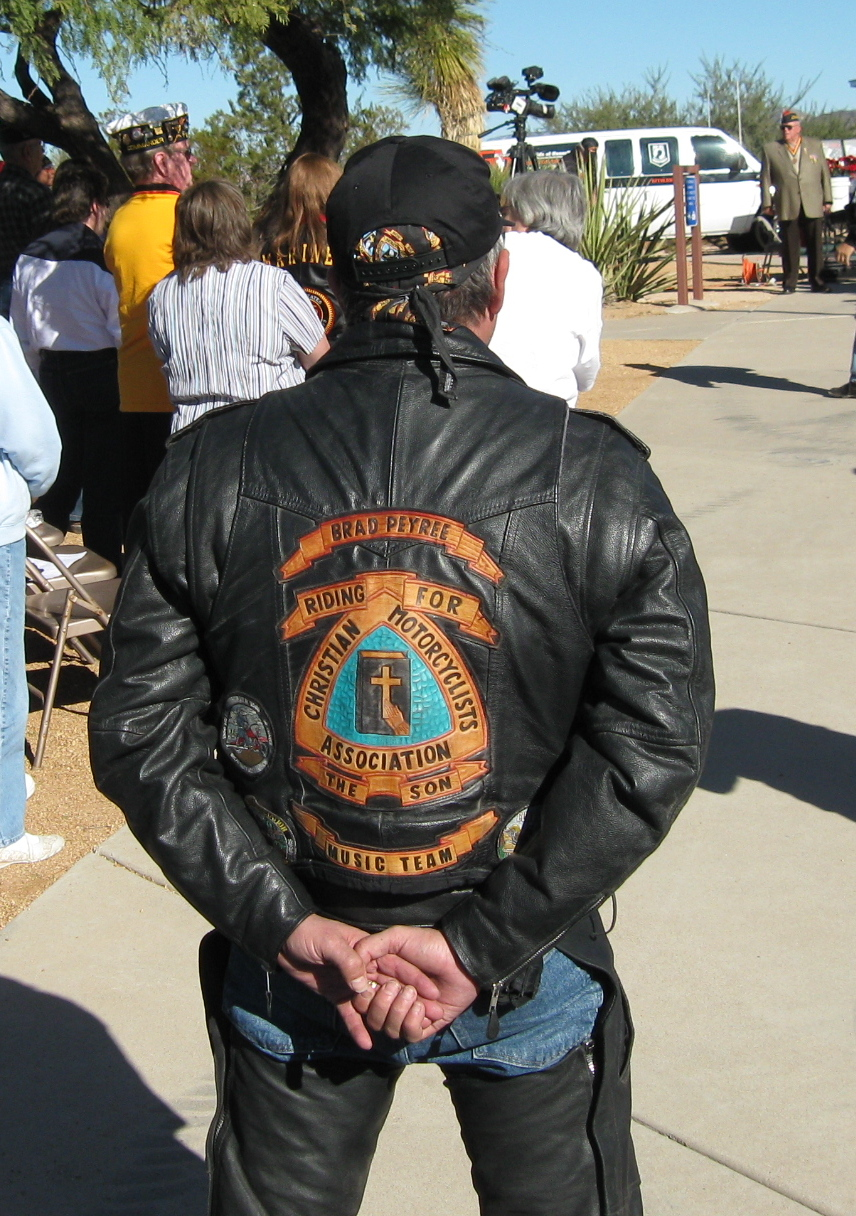
Member of the Christian Motorcyclists Association at the dedication of a World War II memorial on Interstate 17 north of Phoenix, Arizona

In the case of outlaw motorcycle clubs, visual identification of a member is indicated by a specific large club patch or set of patches, usually located in the middle of the back of a vest or jacket. The patches may contain a club logo, the name of the club and other chapter identification.

In most motorcycle clubs, the patch representing membership in the organization is often referred to as "the club colors" or simply "the colors". Each club has rules on how the colors are treated and when it is proper to wear them. Well structured clubs have bylaws dictating the behavior of its members and thus the proper use of their colors.

== Tattoos ==
Tattoos may also come under the category of club colors.

== See also ==
- Gang colors
- School colors
- Sports uniform
