= Bandidos MC criminal allegations and incidents in Denmark =

Criminal incidents involving the Bandidos Motorcycle Club in Denmark

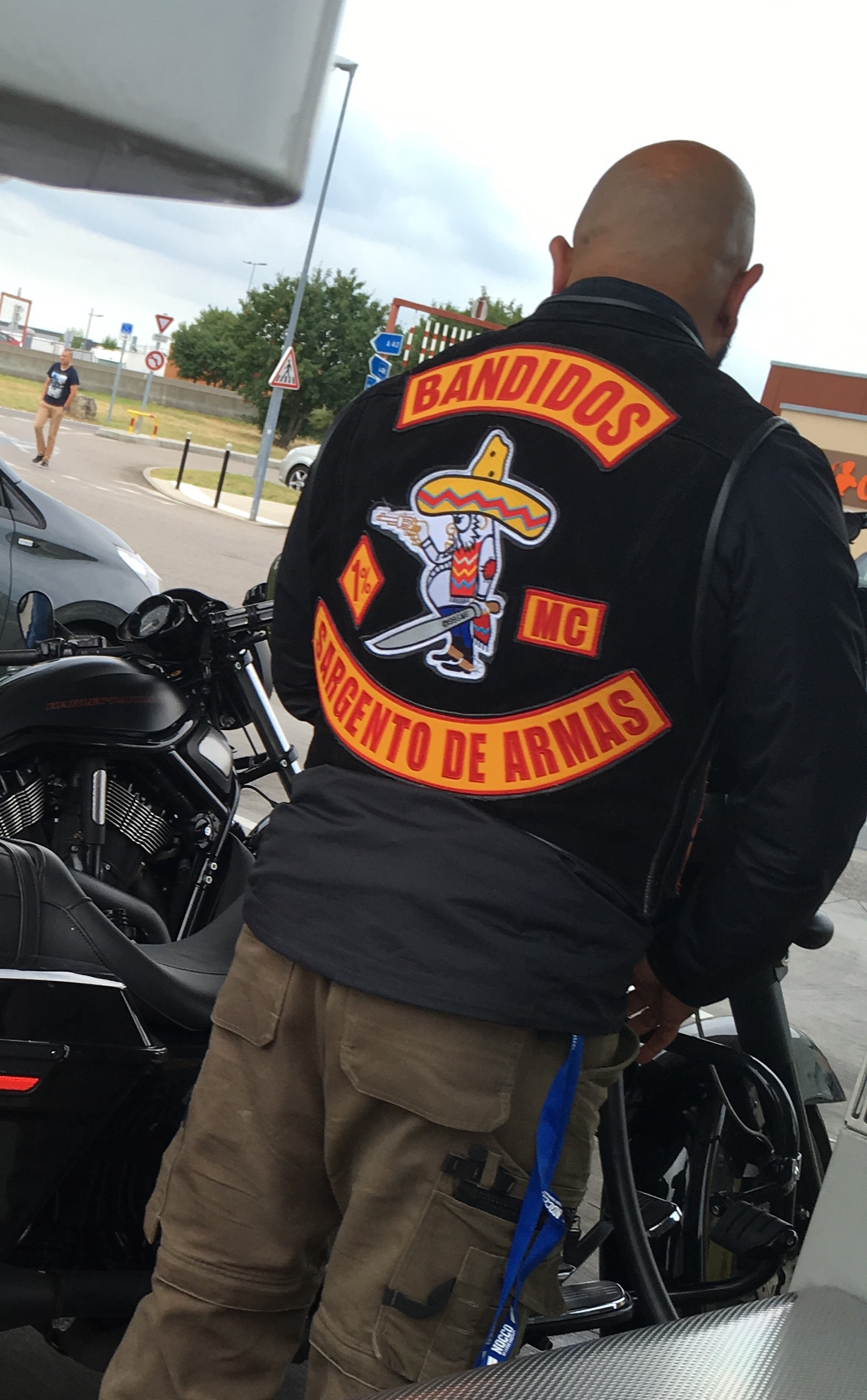
A Bandidos member in Denmark.

The Bandidos Motorcycle Club is classified as a motorcycle gang by law enforcement and intelligence agencies in numerous countries. While the club has denied being a criminal organization, Bandidos members have been convicted of partaking in criminal enterprises including theft, extortion, prostitution, drug trafficking and murder in various host nations.

According to the National Center of Investigation, the Danish Bandidos are involved in a wide range of crimes, including drug dealing, extortion, fraud, tax evasion, robbery, weapons trafficking, money laundering, the sale of stolen goods, and violent crimes. The Bandidos have ten chapters and approximately one-hundred-and-fifty members in Denmark, and have traditionally recruited members of Danish ethnicity, although this has changed somewhat in recent years. The club has links to the Turkish mafia in Denmark.

== Nordic Biker War ==
The forerunner to the Bandidos in Denmark was the Morticians, a club founded in 1984. The Morticians were initially a support club of the Hells Angels but by 1988, both groups had transformed from motorcycle enthusiasts and small-time criminals into more sophisticated criminal organizations, and disputes between the groups led to a feud. After merging with other clubs rejected by or opposed to the Hells Angels, the Morticians rebranded as the Undertakers, establishing two chapters; "Northland" (based in Stenløse) and "East Coast" (in Hørsholm). In 1992, the Undertakers contacted Bandidos leadership in the United States and France – where the club's only European chapter at that point was based – seeking membership. After serving as prospective members for a short time, the Undertakers were patched over by the Bandidos on 17 December 1993. In August 1995, the Bandidos' "Northland" chapter became the club's head chapter in Europe. Between 1994 and 1997, there were at least 36 break-ins at Danish and Swedish Army installations; at least 16 Bofors anti-tank missiles, 10 machine guns, around 300 handguns, 67 fully automatic rifles, 205 rifles of various calibres, hundreds of hand grenades and land mines, and 17 kilograms of explosives plus detonators were stolen. Police believe the Bandidos or their support clubs were responsible for the majority of the thefts.

A turf war that began in January 1994 between the Morbids Motorcycle Club and the Hells Angels in southern Sweden would later escalate into what would be known as the Nordic Biker War when the Morbids aligned with the Bandidos, sparking a three-year-long gang war between the clubs for control over the drug trade in the Nordic countries. After incidents in Sweden, Finland and Norway, the war reached Denmark on 26 December 1995 when between five and ten Bandidos members attacked and severely beat two Hells Angels at a restaurant in Copenhagen. On 10 March 1996, six Hells Angels ambushed and shot a group of Bandidos at Kastrup Airport in Copenhagen, killing Bandidos "Southside" chapter president Uffe Larsen and wounding another member, a prospect and a hangaround.

Six Hells Angels members and associates were convicted in connection and sentenced to a total of fifty-three years in prison, and one was given a life sentence. On 17 April 1996, the Hells Angels "South" chapter clubhouse in Snoldelev was hit with an anti-tank missile; the fourteen members inside were able to avoid serious injury. Morten "Træben" ("Wooden Leg") Christiansen, the imprisoned vice president of Bandidos "Southside" chapter, was left in critical condition with shrapnel wounds and burns when assailants broke into Horserød State Prison and threw a hand grenade through his cell window which exploded under his bunk on 26 April 1996. Hells Angels Copenhagen member Brian "Bremse" Paludan Jacobsen lost a leg and two associates were also wounded when two grenades were thrown in front of his home from a moving car in Brønshøj on 7 May 1996. Bandidos member Jim Verner was found dead on 10 July 1996 in Nykøbing Falster. A bomb weighing half a kilo was found underneath his car nearby and defused by an explosive ordnance disposal unit.

On 21 July 1996, a six-kilogram remote-controlled bomb hidden in a sports bag and placed in front of the Hells Angels' clubhouse in Ydre Nørrebro, Copenhagen failed to explode when the radio-controlled trigger malfunctioned, potentially saving the lives of four Hells Angels bikers in the building as well as residents of the street. The device was later detonated by police. The fingerprints of Jacob "Hip Hop" Andersen, a member of the Bandidos chapter in Dalby, were found on the sports bag by police technicians. He was sentenced to three-and-a-half years in prison in 1997. On 25 July 1996, Jørn "Jønke" Nielsen, a founding member of the Hells Angels' Copenhagen chapter, was subjected to a murder attempt while sleeping in his cell at Jyderup State Prison. Two-to-four men infiltrated the prison and, after failing to gain access to Nielsen's locked cell, fired over twenty rounds from an automatic weapon through the cell window, shooting Nielsen twice in the abdomen and once in the arm. On 5 August 1996, a civilian was shot in a drive-by shooting in Greve; police believe the victim was mistaken for a Hells Angels member living in the same building. An associate of the Bandidos "Southside" chapter was wounded after being shot in his car as he left the clubhouse near Haslev on 14 August 1996. On 4 September 1996, a bomb planted on the car of a Hells Angels member exploded after falling from the vehicle in a parking lot; the bomb detonated three meters away, damaging several cars but causing no injuries. On 12 September 1996, a car bomb exploded outside a Hells Angels clubhouse situated in a residential neighborhood of Roskilde, causing extensive damage but no injuries. The location was attacked again in the early hours of 22 September 1996, with over two-hundred-and-fifty machine gun rounds fired at the building from an adjacent football pitch, wounding one Hells Angels member.

On 6 October 1996, the Hells Angels were holding their annual "Viking Party", attended by around one-hundred-and-fifty people, at their fortified compound in Copenhagen when the building was struck by a rocket-propelled grenade from a Carl Gustaf M3 84 mm recoilless anti-tank rifle, which had been stolen from a Swedish Army depot during a burglary on 19 February 1994. Hells Angels prospect Louis Linde Nielsen and Janne Krohn, a twenty-nine-year-old woman who resided in the neighborhood and accepted an invitation to the event, were killed. Among the fifteen injured was Hells Angels Denmark national president Christian Middelboe. Bandidos prospect Niels Poulsen was convicted of carrying out the attack in March 1998 and sentenced to life imprisonment. Bandidos and Hells Angels were involved in a shootout outside a Copenhagen restaurant on 1 December 1996; no one was injured. Two members of the Bandidos came under gunfire while trapped in a private yard in Valby, Copenhagen on 5 December 1996; one biker was injured.

On 9 December 1996, a member of the Bandidos' Aalborg chapter survived being shot ten times as he waited in his car. Hells Angels member Kim Thrysøe Svendsen was shot and killed while driving in Vejgaard, Aalborg when unknown perpetrators fired three rounds at his car on 10 January 1997. Around 500 Hells Angels bikers from across Europe and the United States attended Svendsen's funeral. Several members of the Bandidos were charged with the killing, but due to lack of evidence, the prosecution had to give up the case, after which the suspects were released. The murder remains unsolved. On 2 February 1997, a prominent Bandidos member remanded in a detention center in Køge survived an attempt on his life when an anti-tank missile fired at his cell failed to explode. Another Bandidos member survived a murder attempt the following day on Amager after being shot while walking to his car. The shooting took place near a kindergarten. The Hells Angels again attempted to kill a jailed rival by firing an anti-tank missile into a police cellblock in Holbæk on 18 February 1997, destroying two cells but leaving a Bandido and another inmate unhurt.

On 1 April 1997, a Hells Angels associate was wounded by a shot from a 9mm pistol, fired at him from another car as he waited at a stop light in Frederiksberg, Copenhagen. Later that day, two men were arrested on suspicion of perpetrating the shooting; one of the men was a Bandidos member. On 1 May 1997, an attempt was made on the life of a Bandidos member being held at Vestre Prison; an electric razor given to him containing ninety-five grams of explosives would have exploded had it been plugged in, but the device was suspected and seized by prison authorities before it was used. Three more attempted murders were carried out against Bandidos members in Denmark that month; one was shot in Køge and another had a Molotov cocktail thrown at his apartment in Copenhagen, while three men associated with the club were shot in Aalborg. On 7 June 1997, four Bandidos members were shot outside a restaurant in Liseleje; Bjørn Gudmandsen was killed and three were wounded. Hells Angels member Vagn Smidt was convicted of the murder and three attempted murders, and sentenced to life in prison on 20 November 1998. The final incident in the biker war took place on 11 June 1997 when a Bandidos clubhouse in Dalby was attacked with a hand grenade. The war formally ended on 25 September 1997 when Bandidos Europe president Jim Tinndahn and his Hells Angels counterpart Bent "Blondie" Svane Nielsen announced that they had signed a peace agreement and shook hands in front of Danish television news cameras. As part of the truce, the clubs agreed to cease expansion in the Nordic countries and to divide territories of criminal activity. Although terms of the agreement have since been broken by both sides, the Bandidos and Hells Angels have largely been able to avoid conflict.

== Subsequent conflicts with the Hells Angels ==
Claus Bork Hansen, a former senior member of the Bandidos who was expelled from the club and later aligned himself with the Hells Angels, was killed after being shot twenty-six times as he returned home from restaurant with his girlfriend in Vanløse, Copenhagen on 21 March 2001. He had previously been warned by police that he was on the Bandidos' hit list and was offered protection, which he refused. Four Bandidos members were charged with his murder; Jens Christian Thorup was found guilty of killing Hansen on 11 April 2002, while Kent "Kemo" Sørensen, Karl Martin Thorup and Peter Buch Rosenberg were cleared. Thorup was initially sentenced to life in prison but his sentence was reduced to sixteen years on 15 January 2003. Hansen had made a pact with his close friend and fellow Bandidos member Mickey Borgfjord Larsen, where they mutually promised to take revenge in the event of the other's murder. Larsen threatened the lives of several high-ranking Bandidos following Hansen's death and was subsequently killed himself in a car bombing in Glostrup on 17 September 2003. Bandidos members Jacob "Hip Hop" Andersen and Lennart Elkjær Christensen were convicted of murdering Larsen and were sentenced to life in prison on 13 June 2005. Their sentences were reduced to sixteen years on 6 January 2006.

Bandidos associate Flemming Jensen was beaten and stabbed to death by Hells Angels members in a tavern in Aalborg on 12 August 2001. Hells Angels prospect Jesper Østenkær Kristoffersen confessed to stabbing Jensen eight times and was sentenced to six years in prison for manslaughter on 7 February 2002, while Jørn "Jønke" Nielsen was sentenced to four years on 18 September 2002 for aggravated assault resulting in death as witnesses claimed that he had kicked and stomped on Jensen.

Renewed tensions between the Bandidos and Hells Angels resulted in an outbreak of violence in September 2012. After two stabbings and an attempted hit-and-run, a seventeen-ton unmanned truck with a brick on the accelerator ploughed into a property used by the Bandidos on Amager on 18 September 2012. Police suspect the incident was carried out by the Hells Angels support group AK81. The following day, a hundred bikers – including Bandidos Europe president Michael "The Chef" Rosenvold – were arrested as police raided eighteen locations across Zealand in an attempt to assert control ahead of a what they believed to be an imminent gang war. Guns, knives, axes, drugs and anabolic steroids were also seized in the raids.

== Drug trafficking ==
On 15 November 2002, Bandidos prospect Stig Bartholdy was sentenced to fourteen years in prison at the High Court of Western Denmark for attempting to smuggle cocaine and hashish from the Netherlands to Denmark, and for producing counterfeit money. Nine men and one woman were sentenced to a total of ninety years in prison in a comprehensive narcotics case for smuggling amphetamine, MDMA, hashish and cocaine.

Bandidos member Thomas Brian Jensen was sentenced to seven years and six months in prison on 16 November 2011 after he pleaded guilty to selling two kilograms of amphetamine and 300 grams of cocaine, and for possessing two guns with ammunition at his residence in Haslev when he was arrested on 29 June 2011.

== Conflicts with other gangs ==
The Bandidos and Hells Angels remained the leading criminal organizations in Denmark until law enforcement efforts against motorcycle gangs allowed numerous upstart immigrant gangs – such as Black Army, Black Cobra, Bloodz, Brothas and Loyal to Familia (LTF) – to seize control of markets and territories previously dominated by the bikers. In addition to street gangs, newly arrived motorcycle gangs also challenged the Bandidos' and Angels' control of the biker scene. In 2013, the Dutch club Satudarah opened a chapter in Bagsværd. This was then followed by the influx of three German groups; Black Jackets, Gremium and United Tribuns. Police have speculated that the Dutch and German gangs expanded into Denmark to enter the country's criminal market, and that the Bandidos and Hells Angels initially permitted this encroachment on their territory as they wanted to avoid a turf war which would draw police attention to their illegal activities. According to a report by Politiken in 2016, there were at least ten major gangs active in Denmark. That same year, the Rigspolitiet stated that there were a total of ninety-six gangs in the country.

=== Black Cobra ===
A war between the Bandidos and the Black Cobra gang erupted in Køge after Oruc Türkoglu, a leading Black Cobra figure in the city, was wounded in a stabbing by Bandidos members on 29 January 2013. A few days later, shots were fired at the home of another Black Cobra member southwest of Copenhagen, although no one was injured. In the early hours of 6 February 2013, a prospective Bandidos member was shot in the knee after being attacked by three Black Cobra members at his home in Herfølge. Later that day, a tattoo parlor in Køge associated with the Bandidos was riddled with gunfire by two young men on a moped. A fifteen-year-old Black Cobra member was charged with attempted murder after police raided twenty-three properties and recovered two firearms during a crackdown on the gang environment on 28 February 2013. A truce was reached and the conflict was brought to an end after four representatives from each gang met on 29 March 2013.

=== Brothas ===
Bandidos sergeant-at-arms Peter Buch Rosenberg and another club member, Michael Fuhlendorff, were convicted of weapons possession after police discovered two loaded guns, a silencer, binoculars and other equipment at a cottage in Dronningmølle where Rosenberg was living, protected by two bodyguards, during a conflict with the Brothas Souljaz gang. The find came shortly after gunshots had been fired at a Bandidos clubhouse in Hvidovre in March 2013. At the High Court of Eastern Denmark in March 2014, Rosenberg was sentenced to one year and six months' imprisonment and Fuhlendorff was sentenced to two years and nine months', which included a sentence for additional crimes.

=== Westside Nation and Satudarah ===
In July 2013, a conflict erupted between the Bandidos and the Westside Nation, a breakaway group of former members of the club's "Westside" chapter in Næstved who defected following a dispute over the club's national leadership. Although no one has been charged for the crimes, it is believed that the Westside Nation was responsible for a number of arson attacks that took place in the autumn of that year, including a Molotov cocktail attack on a tattoo parlor owned by a Bandidos member in Rødovre on 3 October 2013 and the burning of a commercial property in Kvistgård on 20 November 2013. A Westside Nation figure was assaulted and stabbed in his home in Næstved in November 2013. On 9 December 2013, Edin Fakic, the brother of a Westside Nation member, was shot and killed with a machine gun in his Næstved apartment after being mistaken for his gang member sibling Nermin Fakic. Bandidos member Martin David Larsen was convicted of the murder in December 2015, although his accomplices in the killing were never identified.

The Westside Nation disbanded in 2014, with some members returning to the Bandidos and others patching over to Satudarah, forming the core of the club's Copenhagen chapter. This resulted in the beginning of a gang war between the Bandidos and Satudarah. Three shootings involving Bandidos and Satudarah took place in Næstved between 23 September and 4 October 2016, leaving three men wounded. Two teenaged Bandidos associates were convicted of attempted murder for the 23 September 2016 shooting of a Satudarah member and were sentenced to eight and nine years in prison in May 2018. Further shootings took place on 12 and 13 October 2016, with two homes being shot at. Police believe the shootings are related to a conflict over control of the town's drug market. Two Bandidos members were stabbed after a mass brawl with Satudarah members broke out at a boxing event in Herlev on 27 October 2017. An upsurge in violence ensued in the following days. On 29 October 2017, two shots were fired through the window of the home of a Bandidos member in Nørre Alslev, and a Bandidos member was assaulted by six men in Søborg the following day. The brother of a Satudarah member was tracked down and beaten shortly after. Attacks with Molotov cocktails and firearms were carried out on Bandidos clubouses in Køge and Hvidovre on 31 October and 2 November 2017, respectively. On 4 November 2017, a car was burned at Satudarah's clubhouse in Egedal. On 29 March 2019, Bandidos prospect Jim-Bo Poulsen was convicted of the attempted murder of a hashish dealer and Satudarah member who was shot six times in Næstved on 13 November 2017. Another prospect, Kenneth Bech Simonsen, was acquitted of taking part in the shooting but convicted of unlawful possession of a weapon. In September 2019, Bandidos "Westside" chapter president Kristian "Biggie" Beck Hansen was sentenced to eleven-and-a-half years in prison for organizing the attempted murder. Hansen had previously been sentenced on 29 March 2019 to two-and-a-half years in prison for trafficking seventy-five kilograms of hash. In February 2020, Hansen was acquitted of the attempted murder after an appeal. Poulsen's sentence was also reduced from twelve years from eight. Denmark's three dominant motorcycle gangs – the Bandidos, Hells Angels and Satudarah – reportedly entered into an agreement to counteract disputes in June 2019. One rule of the agreement states that the clubs must avoid recruiting former members of one another as this has been a frequent cause of conflicts. The agreement was made after membership of the LTF street gang was made illegal by authorities, and the bikers became concerned that they could be targeted with similar legislation.

=== Black Army ===
Beginning in 2014, a feud involving the Bandidos and the Black Army resulted in numerous shootings and assaults in Næstved, where both gangs have clubhouses. Arising from a dispute over the hash market in Næstved, the conflict commenced on 4 October 2014 when a shot was fired at the president of the Bandidos "Westside" chapter through a window in his home. Two people were convicted for the act. After several clashes during the spring and summer of 2015, the rival groups attempted to settle the dispute during a meeting at a restaurant in the city on 4 September 2015, in which leaders from both factions participated. After a period of peace, the conflict briefly flared up again in December 2015. On 27 December 2015, five Black Army members were chased into a police station after being shot at following a confrontation with Bandidos bikers. The following day, Black Army members attacked Bandidos with pepper spray. The Black Army shot six rounds at the Bandidos' clubhouse in the early morning of 30 December 2015, and the Bandidos responded by firing five shots at the Black Army clubhouse in the early evening hours of 1 January 2016. Due to the risk posed to ordinary citizens of Næstved by the gang war, South Zealand and Lolland-Falster Police decided to prohibit access to the clubhouses of both groups for a two-week period beginning 2 January 2016, a ban made possible by the Rockerloven, an anti-gang law passed during the Nordic Biker War in 1996.

=== Loyal to Familia ===
An attack on a man in the Vapnagård housing estate in Helsingør on 30 June 2015 was linked to a conflict between the Bandidos and the immigrant gang LTF. The victim, an immigrant, was airlifted to Rigshospitalet. The following week, on 6 July 2015, shots were fired at the Bandidos' clubhouse in the town. The building was hit, although no one was injured.

=== Vanløse Group ===
A Bandidos member holding the rank of krigsminister (“minister for war”) within the club was convicted of the 11 November 2015 triple murder of Philip Rasmussen, Suhaib Jaffar, and Mike Patrick Winther, members of a gang known as the Vanløse Group who were killed with a revolver and a shotgun as they slept in their apartment in Frederiksberg, Copenhagen. Two non-club members were also convicted as accomplices to the crime; one was found guilty of accessory to murder, and the other of possessing firearms. The trio were convicted in May 2017. A fourth man, also a Bandidos member accused of taking part in the murders, committed suicide in custody in June 2016. According to the court transcripts, the murders were a culmination of a conflict between a member of the Bandidos and the victims that may have taken place weeks before.

=== Gremium ===
The Bandidos have also been involved in a turf war with Gremium in North Zealand after Gremium opened a chapter in the traditional Bandidos stronghold of Helsinge on 3 February 2017 by patching-over the Local BrotherHood (LBH) gang. In June 2017, a man associated with Gremium was convicted of assaulting a Bandidos associate in the Skærød area of Helsinge on 2 April 2017. In May 2017, a police operation led to the arrests of twenty-one people after two groups of gang members from Bandidos and Gremium clashed in the town. A senior Gremium member survived a shooting attempt in Helsinge in November 2017. In May 2018, two men associated with the Bandidos were sentenced to prison after being convicted of a hit-and-run on a Gremium member that took place in November 2017.

== Other incidents ==
On 21 June 2002, two Bandidos members – Jacob Daniel Winefeld and Robin Nielsen – committed a particularly serious bank robbery against a Nordea branch in Ålsgårde. Michael Pichard, a bystander who tried to stop the robbery by overturning the robbers' motorcycle and blocking the bank entrance with his car to prevent them from fleeing, was shot and killed by Winefeld. On 2 October 2003, Winefeld and Nielsen were sentenced to sixteen years in prison for the robbery and the murder of Michael Pichard.

Nyborg State Prison inspector Jens Tolstrup was assaulted in the garden of his residence in Nyborg by two men armed with baseball bats on 6 November 2002. Tolstrup left his role as prison inspector in November 2003. On 12 February 2004, there was an attempted hit-and-run on a prison official outside the prison. Two months later, three men associated with the Bandidos were arrested and charged with both assaults. On 13 October 2005, club hangarounds Mikael Sartil and Rasmus Vanman Munk Jensen were convicted of the assault on Tolstrup and the attempted assault. Michael Kenneth Pedersen, vice-president of the Hillerød Bandidos chapter, was acquitted of planning Tolstrup's attack but was found guilty of the attempted assault. Sartil, Jensen and Pedersen were sentenced to nine, eight and six years in prison, respectively.

Former Bandidos member Jan "Clark" Jensen, who had previously been a member of the Roskilde Hells Angels chapter before joining the Bandidos in Helsingborg, Sweden during the 1990s, disappeared in December 2011 and his burnt-out car was found in a wooded area in the Copenhagen suburb of Albertslund. No arrests have been made in the case, although police believe that he was murdered. Jensen had resigned from the Bandidos but still continued to be part of the environment around the club on south Zealand.

Nicolas Nielsen, a member of the Holbæk Bandidos chapter, was sentenced on 17 September 2020 to three years and six months in prison after being convicted of aggravated assault for an attack on a man at a property near Gørlev in September 2019, which left the victim with several facial injuries, a skull fracture and several other injuries.
