= 2021 Rødovre municipal election =

← 2017	16 November 2021	2025 →

All 19 seats to the Rødovre Municipal Council 10 seats needed for a majority
- Turnout: 19,105 (59.9%) ▼5.1pp
	First party	Second party	Third party
	A	C	F
Party	Social Democrats	Conservatives	Green Left
Last election	11 seat, 51.9%	3 seats, 11.9%	1 seat, 6.6%
Seats won	9	5	2
Seat change	▼2	▲2	▲1
Popular vote	8,534	3,731	2,036
Percentage	45.5%	19.9%	10.9%
Swing	▼6.4%	▲8%	▲4.3%
	Fourth party	Fifth party	Sixth party
	Ø	V	O
Party	Red–Green Alliance	Venstre	Danish People's Party
Last election	2 seats, 7.4%	1 seat, 5.2%	1 seat, 8.7%
Seats won	2	1	0
Seat change	0	0	▼1
Popular vote	1,451	813	703
Percentage	7.7%	4.3%	3.8%
Swing	▲0.3%	▼0.9%	▼4.9%
Mayor before election
Britt Jensen (Note: Erik Nielsen became mayor following the 2017 election, however he stepped down in January 2020.)
Social Democrats
Mayor after election
Britt Jensen
Social Democrats

Rødovre Municipality has in its history been a strong area for parties of the red bloc. In the 2019 Danish general election, it would become the municipality where the bloc received the 4th highest % of votes. Ever since 1952 the Social Democrats had also held the mayor's position.

In the 2017 election, the Social Democrats had won an absolute majority, and this led to Erik Nielsen becoming mayor, which he had been since 1994.

In January 2020, it was revealed that Erik Nielsen would step down as mayor, and Britt Jensen, from the same party, would take over.

In this election, the Social Democrats would lose its absolute majority, but would still remain the largest party. Only 5 parties won representation, and 13 of the seats were for parties of the red bloc. Britt Jensen would eventually find a majority and she would therefore continue as mayor.

== Electoral system ==
For elections to Danish municipalities, a number varying from 9 to 31 are chosen to be elected to the municipal council. The seats are then allocated using the D'Hondt method and a closed list proportional representation. Rødovre Municipality had 19 seats in 2021

Unlike in Danish General Elections, in elections to municipal councils, electoral alliances are allowed.

== Electoral alliances ==
=== Electoral Alliance 1 ===
Party		Political alignment
B	Social Liberals	Centre to Centre-left
C	Conservatives	Centre-right
K	Christian Democrats	Centre to Centre-right
V	Venstre	Centre-right

=== Electoral Alliance 2 ===
Party		Political alignment
F	Green Left	Centre-left to Left-wing
Ø	Red–Green Alliance	Left-wing to Far-Left

== Results by polling station ==
Division	A	B	C	D	F	K	O	V	Ø
Division	%	%	%	%	%	%	%	%	%
Ørbygård	39.0	5.0	22.0	2.8	9.9	1.6	3.3	7.0	9.4
Tinderhøj	47.3	2.4	17.5	3.7	13.2	0.7	4.5	3.8	6.8
Rødovre	43.3	3.6	21.6	3.7	11.1	1.3	3.4	4.4	7.6
Valhøj	52.0	2.5	14.2	3.9	10.3	0.7	5.0	3.5	7.8
Milestedet	61.3	2.2	7.0	4.5	6.0	0.8	5.0	1.7	11.7
Islev	44.0	3.6	23.5	3.1	9.9	1.1	3.6	4.3	7.0
Rødovrehallen	44.3	4.2	22.0	2.8	11.5	0.8	3.0	4.2	7.3

== Results ==
Party		Votes	%	+/-	Seats	+/-
Rødovre Municipality
A	Social Democrats	8,539	45.53	-6.34	9	-2
C	Conservatives	3,732	19.90	+8.04	5	+2
F	Green Left	2,037	10.86	+4.30	2	+1
Ø	Red-Green Alliance	1,451	7.74	+0.33	2	0
V	Venstre	813	4.33	-0.92	1	0
O	Danish People's Party	703	3.75	-4.92	0	-1
B	Social Liberals	657	3.50	+1.28	0	0
D	New Right	634	3.38	+2.22	0	0
K	Christian Democrats	190	1.01	New	0	New
Total		18,756	100	N/A	19	N/A
Invalid votes		57	0.18	-0.16		
Blank votes		292	0.91	+0.25		
Turnout		19,105	59.86	-5.10		
Source: valg.dk
