= 2025 Rødovre municipal election =

Municipal election in Denmark

← 2021	18 November 2025	2029 →

All 19 seats to the Rødovre municipal council 10 seats needed for a majority
- Turnout: 21,138 (62.1%) ▲2.3%
	First party	Second party	Third party
	A	C	F
Party	Social Democrats	Conservatives	Green Left
Last election	9 seats, 45.5%	5 seats, 19.9%	2 seats, 10.9%
Seats won	8	3	3
Seat change	▼1	▼2	▲1
Popular vote	7,631	2,929	2,898
Percentage	36.8%	14.1%	14.0%
Swing	▼8.7%	▼5.8%	▲3.1%
	Fourth party	Fifth party	Sixth party
	Ø	O	B
Party	Red-Green Alliance	Danish People's Party	Social Liberals
Last election	2 seats, 7.7%	0 seats, 3.7%	0 seats, 3.5%
Seats won	2	2	1
Seat change	0	▲2	▲1
Popular vote	2,311	1,673	842
Percentage	11.2%	8.1%	4.1%
Swing	▲3.4%	▲4.3%	▲0.6%
	Seventh party
	V
Party	Venstre
Last election	1 seat, 4.3%
Seats won	0
Seat change	▼1
Popular vote	648
Percentage	3.1%
Swing	▼1.2%
Mayor before election
Britt Jensen
Social Democrats
Mayor after election
Britt Jensen
Social Democrats

The 2025 Rødovre Municipal election was held on November 18, 2025, to elect the 19 members to sit in the regional council for the Rødovre Municipal council, in the period of 2026 to 2029. Britt Jensen from the Social Democrats, would secure re-election.

== Background ==
Following the 2021 election, Britt Jensen from Social Democrats became mayor for her first term. She would run for re-election.

== Electoral system ==
For elections to Danish municipalities, a number varying from 9 to 31 are chosen to be elected to the municipal council. The seats are then allocated using the D'Hondt method and a closed list proportional representation. Rødovre Municipality had 19 seats in 2025.

== Electoral alliances ==
=== Electoral Alliance 1 ===
Party		Political alignment
B	Social Liberals	Centre to Centre-left
M	Moderates	Centre to Centre-right

=== Electoral Alliance 2 ===
Party		Political alignment
C	Conservatives	Centre-right
K	Christian Democrats	Centre to Centre-right
V	Venstre	Centre-right

=== Electoral Alliance 3 ===
Party		Political alignment
F	Green Left	Centre-left to Left-wing
Ø	Red-Green Alliance	Left-wing to Far-Left

=== Electoral Alliance 4 ===
Party		Political alignment
I	Liberal Alliance	Centre-right to Right-wing
O	Danish People's Party	Right-wing to Far-right
Æ	Denmark Democrats	Right-wing to Far-right

== Results by polling station ==
Division	A	B	C	F	I	K	L	M	O	V	Æ	Ø
Division	%	%	%	%	%	%	%	%	%	%	%	%
Ørbygård	36.7	5.2	15.5	12.5	3.7	1.6	0.0	2.4	6.2	3.4	2.5	10.3
Tinderhøj	39.8	3.2	12.6	16.5	2.5	1.2	0.1	1.6	8.4	2.5	2.4	9.3
Rødovre Skole	34.9	5.1	16.2	13.7	3.1	1.2	0.1	2.5	7.5	3.2	2.1	10.5
Valhøj	39.7	3.1	10.9	14.1	1.7	0.6	0.1	1.7	11.9	2.7	2.2	11.3
Rødovrehallen	36.0	4.3	14.1	15.1	3.8	0.5	0.1	3.0	7.1	3.8	1.9	10.2
Islev	35.5	3.5	17.2	12.5	2.9	0.6	0.3	2.5	7.3	3.3	2.0	12.3
Milestedet	38.5	2.6	5.6	10.9	2.4	1.0	0.3	2.4	11.6	1.1	2.1	21.7

== Results ==
Party		Votes	%	+/-	Seats	+/-
Rødovre Municipality
A	Social Democrats	7,631	36.84	-8.68	8	-1
C	Conservatives	2,929	14.14	-5.76	3	-2
F	Green Left	2,898	13.99	+3.13	3	+1
Ø	Red-Green Alliance	2,311	11.16	+3.42	2	0
O	Danish People's Party	1,673	8.08	+4.33	2	+2
B	Social Liberals	842	4.06	+0.56	1	+1
V	Venstre	648	3.13	-1.21	0	-1
I	Liberal Alliance	625	3.02	New	0	New
M	Moderates	494	2.38	New	0	New
Æ	Denmark Democrats	446	2.15	New	0	New
K	Christian Democrats	189	0.91	-0.10	0	0
L	Kludder og borgernes liste	30	0.14	New	0	New
Total		20,716	100	N/A	19	N/A
Invalid votes		82	0.24	+0.06		
Blank votes		340	1.00	+0.21		
Turnout		21,138	62.10	+2.26		
Source: valg.dk

== Opinion polls ==
Polling firm	Fieldwork date	Sample size	A	C	F	Ø	V	O	B	K	I	L	M	Æ	Others	Lead
Epinion	4 Sep - 13 Oct 2025	523	42.6	9.8	14.3	9.7	2.6	11.5	1.0	–	3.9	–	1.1	3.3	0.0	28.3
2024 european parliament election	9 Jun 2024		20.4	8.0	21.4	9.5	8.4	7.6	7.3	–	5.5	–	5.6	3.4	–	1.0
2022 general election	1 Nov 2022		33.1	4.5	10.4	6.0	8.0	4.4	4.2	0.5	6.4	–	9.7	4.1	–	22.7
2021 regional election	16 Nov 2021		37.6	17.1	11.1	8.4	6.2	4.4	5.9	0.9	1.1	–	–	–	–	20.5
2021 municipal election	16 Nov 2021		45.5 (9)	19.9 (5)	10.9 (2)	7.7 (2)	4.3 (1)	3.7 (0)	3.5 (0)	1.0 (0)	–	–	–	–	–	25.6
