= Zoran Manaskov =

Macedonian leader of the Frankfurt mafia

Zoran Manaskov "Skršeniot"
- Зоран Манасков "Скршениот"
- Born: Veles, SFRY (today North Macedonia)
- Citizenship: North Macedonia
- Occupation: Crime boss
- Years active: late 1990s - 2010
- Organization: Frankfurt mafia
- Known for: founding and leading the Frankfurt mafia (till 2010)
- Status: In prison
- Allegiance: Frankfurt mafia
- Convictions: 2009 illegal weapons position 2011 Heroin trafficking, money laundering
- Criminal charges: 2009 Illegal weapons position, heroin trafficking, money laundering 2010 Heroin trafficking, money laundering
- Penalty: 1 year (2009); 13 years (2012)
- Capture status: Arrested
- Accomplice: Spase Dimovski Ajdukot

Zoran Manaskov is a Macedonian former leader of the Frankfurt mafia. His nickname is Skršeniot (The Broken One). He was arrested in the police action "Dirigent" in 2010. For the heroin trade in Frankfurt and Vienna, he was sentenced to 13 years in prison along with his crime partner Spase.
