= Black Cobra =

Black Cobra may refer to:

- A type of cobra native to South Asia
- Equatorial spitting cobra or the black spitting cobra
- Naja nigricincta or the black spitting cobra, of southeast Asia
- Black-necked spitting cobra, of sub-Saharan Africa
- Black Cobra (band), American heavy metal band
- Black Cobra (film series), Italian action film series
- Black Cobra (gang), Danish immigrant street gang
- Black Cobra Vijay or Duniya Vijay (born 1974), Indian actor
