= Bandidos =

Bandidos may refer to:

- Bandidos (film), a 1967 Italian spaghetti western film
- Bandidos Films, a Mexican film production house
- Bandidos (TV series), a 2024 Mexican TV series

== See also ==
- Bandidos Motorcycle Club
- Bandidos MC criminal allegations and incidents
- Bandidos MC criminal allegations and incidents in Australia
- Bandidos MC criminal allegations and incidents in Denmark
- Bandidos MC criminal allegations and incidents in the United States
