= Michael Schäfer =

Danish footballer and manager (born 1959)

Personal information
- Full name: Michael Schäfer
- Date of birth: 25 January 1959 (age 67)
- Place of birth: Rødovre, Denmark
- Height: 1.72 m (5 ft 8 in)
- Position: Midfielder

Youth career
- 1965–1975: Avarta
- 1976–1977: Lyngby

Senior career*
Years	Team	Apps	(Gls)
1977–1990	Lyngby	482	(59)

International career
1977–1979	Denmark u-21	8	(0)
1980–1983	Denmark	3	(0)

Managerial career
- 1991–1991: Lyngby BK (assistant)
- 1992–1995: Lyngby FC
- 1995–1996: F.C. Copenhagen
- 1996–1998: Ølstykke FC
- 1998–2001: Fremad Amager
- 2002–2005: BK Avarta
- 2005–2007: B 93
- 2007–2010: AB (assistant)
- * Club domestic league appearances and goals

Michael Schäfer (born 25 January 1959) is a Danish former football player and now manager. In his active career as a midfielder, he played 482 games for Danish club Lyngby BK, as well as three games for the Denmark national football team. At the moment he is a teacher at Virum Skole in Denmark.

== Biography ==
Born in Rødovre in eastern Copenhagen, Schäfer started playing football with local club BK Avarta. He moved on to Lyngby BK, where he played for more than a decade, including the entire decade of the 1980s. He was called up for the Danish national team in July 1980, by national manager Sepp Piontek. In his three years in the national team, Schäfer was a bit-part player and played three national team matches.

He was a part of the Lyngby team that won the first major trophy in club history; the 1983 Danish championship. He also won the 1984 and 1985 Danish Cup trophies with the club. As Lyngby team captain, he captained the team to the 1990 Danish Cup title as well. Having played 482 matches for Lyngby BK, he retired in the fall 1990, 32 years old.

He then went on to be a manager. He started as an assistant coach for Lyngby BK in January 1991, but was promoted to head coach in September 1992, following the departure of Swedish coach Kent Karlsson. In 1995, he became the new manager of F.C. Copenhagen, but he was fired after only one season because of poor results. Since then he has been the manager of several clubs in the lower divisions, among them his former club BK Avarta.

He is also a football commentator for Danish TV3.

== Honours ==
- Danish championship: 1983
- Danish Cup: 1984, 1985 and 1990
