= Listed buildings in Rødovre Municipality =

This is a list of listed buildings in Rødovre Municipality, Denmark.

== The list ==
Listing name	Image	Location	Coordinates	Description
Rødovre Library		Rødovre Parkvej 140, 2610 Rødovre	55°40′51.27″N 12°27′26.36″E	Modernist library building from 1967-1970 by Arne Jacobsen with immediate surroundings
Rødovre Town Hall		Rødovre Parkvej 150, 2610 Rødovre	55°40′51.4″N 12°27′21.79″E	Modernist town hall from 1955 by Arne Jacobsen with immediate surroundings created in collaboration with Eigil Kiær
