= Rødovre Town Hall =

Listed building in Rødovre, Denmark

Coordinates: 55°40′54″N 12°27′10″E

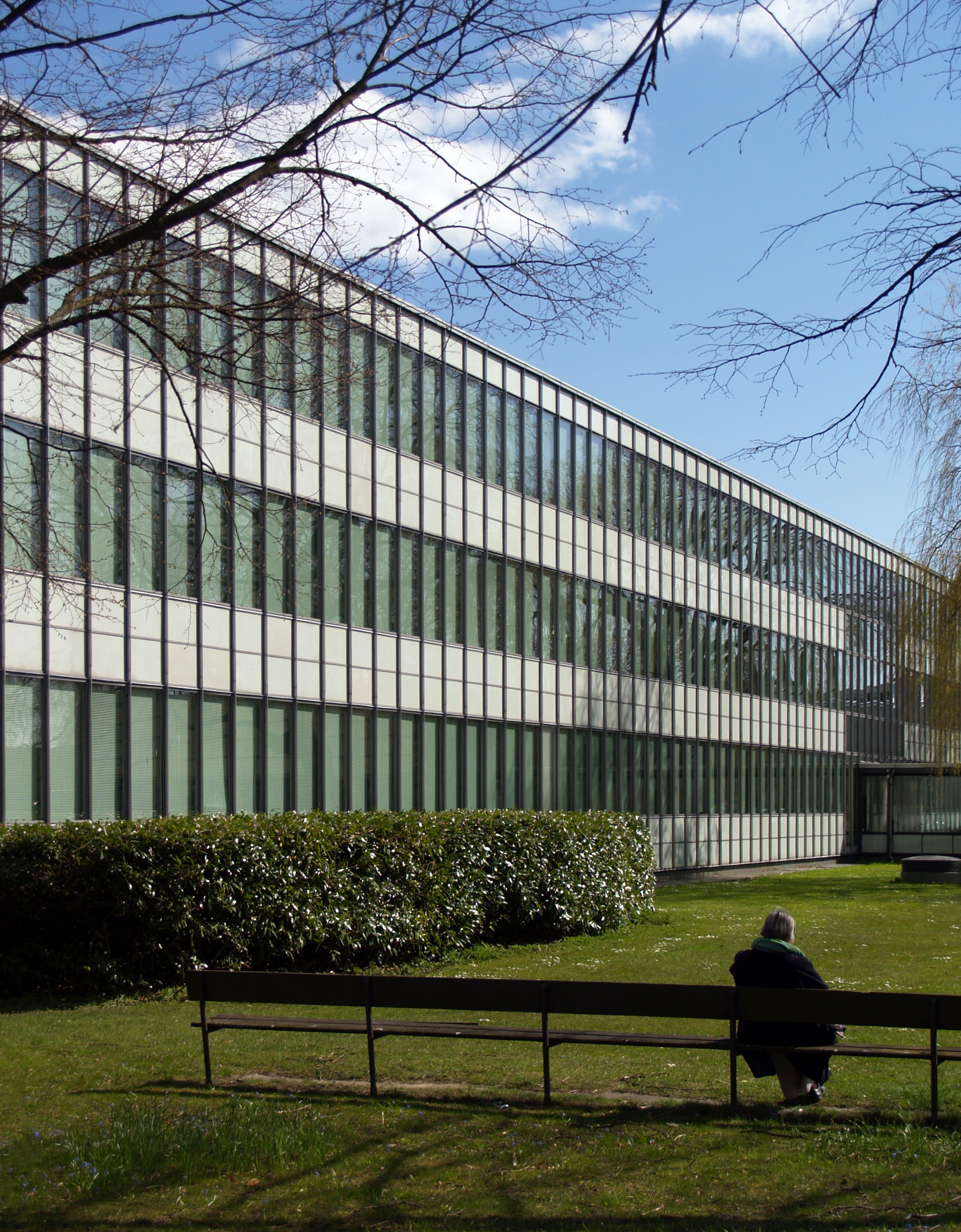
Rødovre Town Hall

Rødovre Town Hall (Danish: Rødovre Rådhus) is located at the centre of Rødovre, a municipality some 9 km (5 mi) to the west of Copenhagen's city centre. Completed in 1956, it was designed by the Danish architect Arne Jacobsen. A fine example of the international architecture trends of the 1950s, it was inspired by the General Motors Technical Center to the north of Detroit.

== Background ==
Modernism had survived the Second World War thanks to European architects working in the United States. From there, the trends returned to Europe. Jacobsen was particularly attracted by the minimalistic work of Mies van der Rohe, Eliel Saarinen, and Skidmore, Owings and Merrill. While the town hall in Rødovre was inspired by Eero Saarinen's General Motors Technical Center, its proportions and details are unmistakably the work of Jacobsen.

== Architecture ==
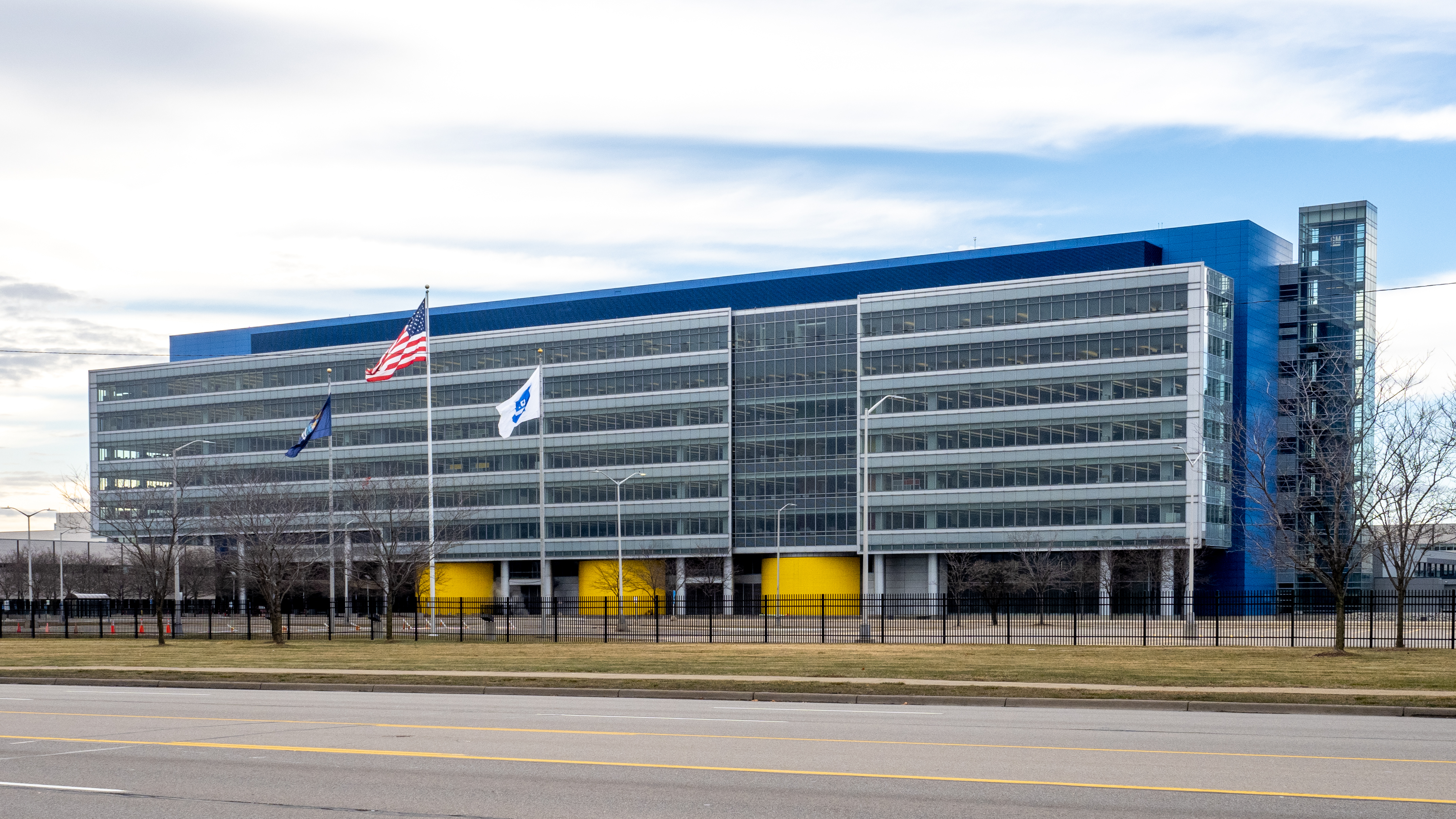
The building was inspired by Eero Saarinen's General Motors Technical Center

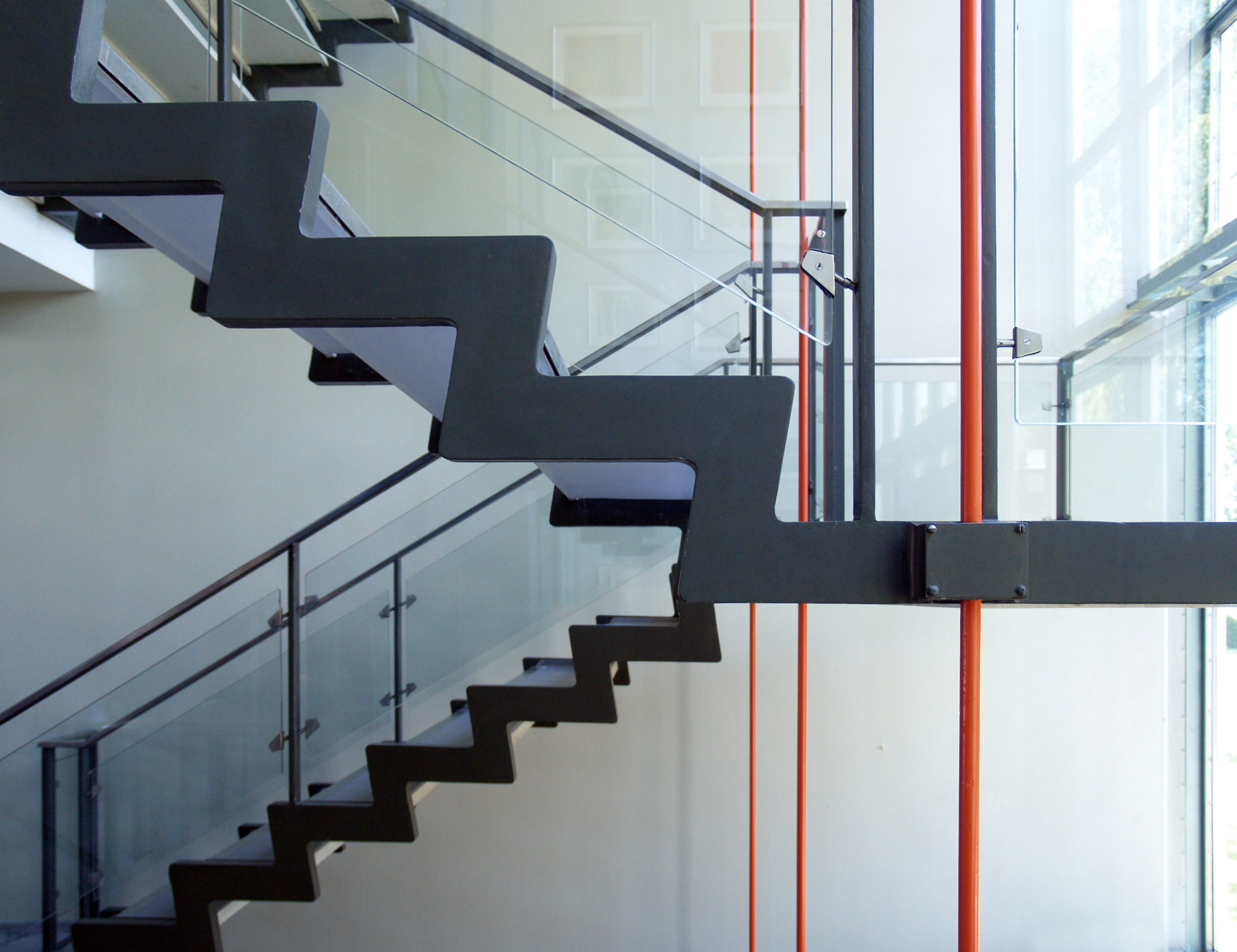
The stairwell

The complex consists of two wings connected by a glass corridor. The three-storey office wing, 91 m long and 14 m wide, is constructed of pillars, precast crossbeams and floor slabs. The loadbearing gable walls are clad in dark stone while the longitudinal curtain walls consist of grey glass set in metal frames with stainless steel trimmings. The wing consists of 1 m facade modules, flexible partitions and a central corridor broken only by a two-flight steel and glass staircase.

The single storey council chamber is 22 m long and 13 m wide. Its longitudinal facades are clad in dark stone while the gables are continuous windows. The lofty council chamber is a rectangular room in which the interior and furnishings were also designed by Jacobsen. The wing also contains two meeting rooms, an entrance hall, cloakroom and toilets.

The building is also noted for its central staircase, suspended from the roof on orange-red steel rods. The sides are cut from 5 cm steel plate, painted a dark grey; the steps, only a few millimeters thick, are stainless steel with a rubber coating on the upper side for better grip.

== See also ==
- Jacobsen's SAS Hotel
- Listed buildings in Rødovre Municipality
