= Rødovre Centrum =

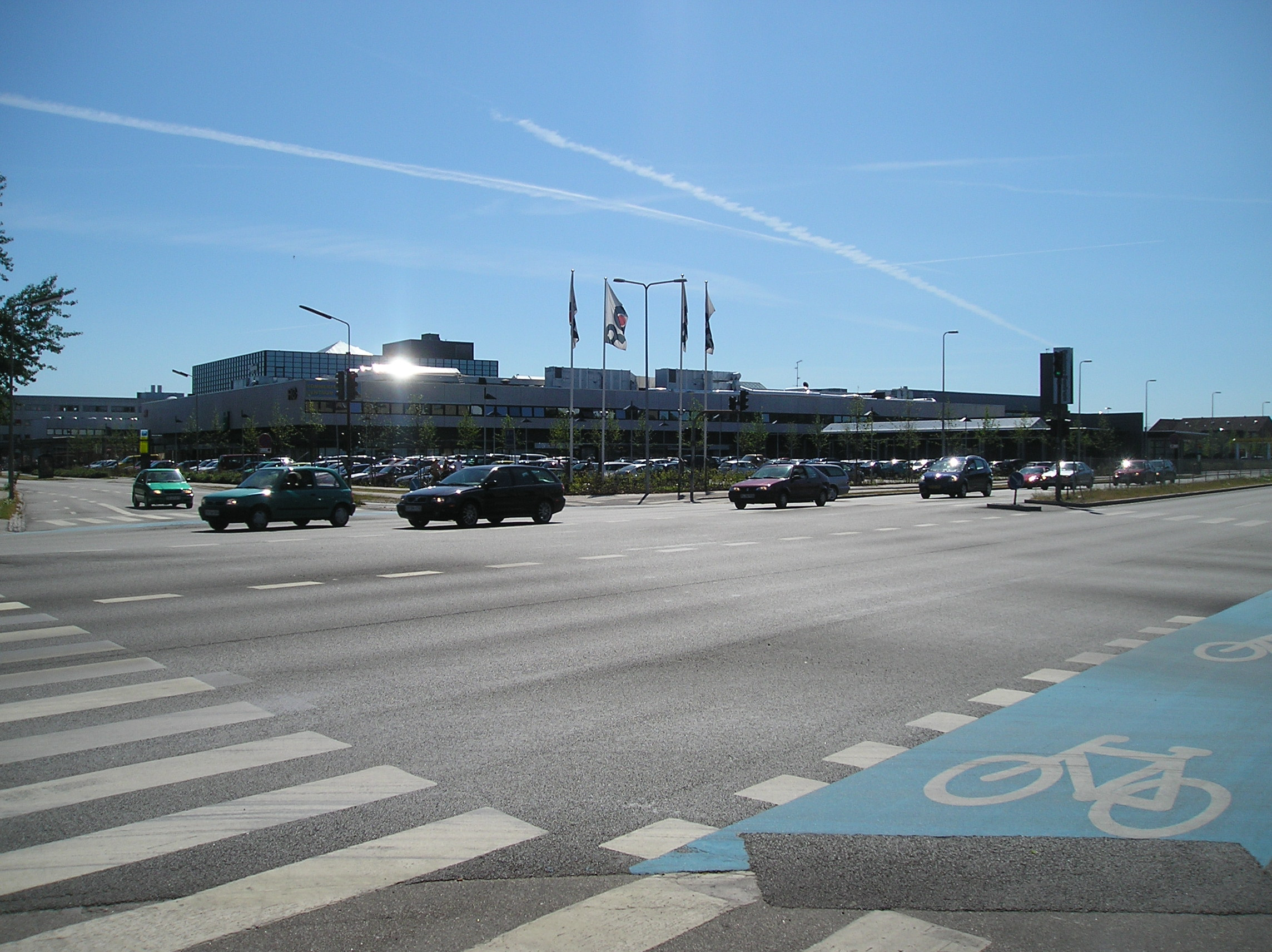
- Location: Rødovre, Copenhagen, Denmark
- Coordinates: 55.6782°N 12.4550°E
- Opened: 1 April 1966
- Owner: Family-owned
- Num. of stores: 160
- Floor area: 44,000 m^{2} (470,000 sq ft)
- Floors: 3
- Parking: 3,250 free spaces
- Website: www.roedovrecentrum.dk

Rødovre Centrum is a shopping center and mixed-use development situated in Rødovre in the western suburbs of Copenhagen, Denmark. It has a total area of 150,000 square metres of which 44,000 square metres are retail space. The shopping center consists of more than a hundred shops and includes a Føtex supermarket and a Magasin du Nord. Other facilities include a cinema multiplex, medical center and 70 apartments.

== History ==
Rødovre Centrum was opened by the gardener Aage Knudsen, with inspiration from American shopping malls in 1966 as the first real shopping mall in Denmark. It was later expanded in 1975, 1989, 2000 and 2003–2006. The founder's grand son, Jesper Andreassen, was appointed to CEO in 1991.

A new, 14,000 m^{2} (150,000 sq ft) expansion was in augurated in 2013. It was undertaken by Hoffmann and Moe.

== Description ==
Rødovre Centrum is located next to Rødovre Town Hall at the corner of Tårnvej with Rødovre Parkvej. The shopping centre contains 100 stores. They include a Magasin du Nord, a Føtex supermarket and a Hennes & Mauritz. Other facilities include a multiplex cinema with five screens, a bowling center and a number of eateries.
