= Black Jackets =

Criminal gang

- Founder: Sedat Karaca
- Founding location: Heidenheim an der Brenz, Germany
- Years active: 1985-present
- Territory: Germany, Netherlands, Denmark
- Ethnicity: Turks. Italians, Serbs and other ethnic minority groups
- Membership: c.2500
- Activities: Arms trafficking drug trafficking robbery extortion arson prostitution burglary vandalism
- Allies: Rock Machine; Veles gang Black Dogs; Bandogs; 210 International; Dogpack 416; Black Army; Holmblaaa; Kommando 210
- Rivals: United Tribuns; Red Legions Stuttgart; AK81; X-Team

The Black Jackets is a primarily ethnically Turkish criminal gang active in Germany, the Netherlands and Denmark.

The Black Jackets were originally formed in 1985 in Heidenheim an der Brenz of immigrants from different countries, such as Turkey, Italy and former Yugoslavia.

== Membership ==
The two most prominent Black Jackets chapters are those based in Germany and in the Netherlands. The two chapters are estimated to have about a 2500 members. They associate with each other and are seen as 'close groups'. A worldwide chapter is operation under the name Black Jackets Nomads Worldwide. The recruiting is non-racial. In Germany most members were recruited from the working class German communities primarily from the communities with immigrant backgrounds. Turks, Serbs, Italians, Kurds, Albanians, Somalis, Montenegrins, Bosniaks, Mhalmites, Russians (ethnic Russians as well as Chechens, Russian Jews and German Russians), Eritreans, Greeks, Afghans and Moroccans have all significantly contributed to the membership in Germany. In the Netherlands the recruitment of people from the working class Dutch (primarily of Traveller/woonwagenbewoner descent), Belgium, Surinamese, Dutch Antillean, Moluccan, Chinese, Bosniaks, Serbs as well as Turkish and Albanian communities has had an extensive impact on the growth of the organization. Black Jackets don't describe themselves as an 'outlaw motorcycle club' nor as a criminal organization, but insist that they are a tight brotherhood of people from diverse ethnic backgrounds.
