= Vapnagård =

Housing project in Helsingør, Denmark

Coordinates: 56.020°N 12.581°E

Vapnagård is a large housing project in Helsingør, Denmark. Approx. 4000 people live in the 57 concrete blocks. Each block has either 3 or 4 floors.
