= Black Cobra (gang) =

Street gang

- Founded: 2000
- Founding location: Roskilde, Denmark
- Years active: 2000–present
- Territory: Denmark and Sweden
- Ethnicity: Iranians, Palestinians, Turks, ethnic Danes, Egyptians, Serbs, Bosniaks, Iraqis and Lebanese
- Membership (est.): Over 100
- Criminal activities: Drug trafficking, extortion, racketeering, vehicle theft and murder
- Allies: Black Army; Black Scorpions; M16; Black Ghost; Black Spider; Black Jackets
- Rivals: AK81; X-Team; Bandidos; Chicanos; Hells Angels

Black Cobra is one of the largest immigrant street gangs in Denmark and is represented in most major Danish cities, with approximately 100 members. The gang is also active in Sweden, having established itself in the Malmö district Rosengård and the Stockholm suburbs of Tensta, Rissne and Rinkeby. The Black Cobra gang also control a youth gang called the Black Scorpions. Their criminal activity involves drug trafficking, robbery, theft, racketeering, extortion and murder. The police describe Black Cobra as a loose network composed of strong leadership figures. Black Cobra members wear black and white shirts with an emblem on the back of a cobra in attack position. The shirts also have Black Cobra written on them, above the emblem in Old English-style writing.

== History ==
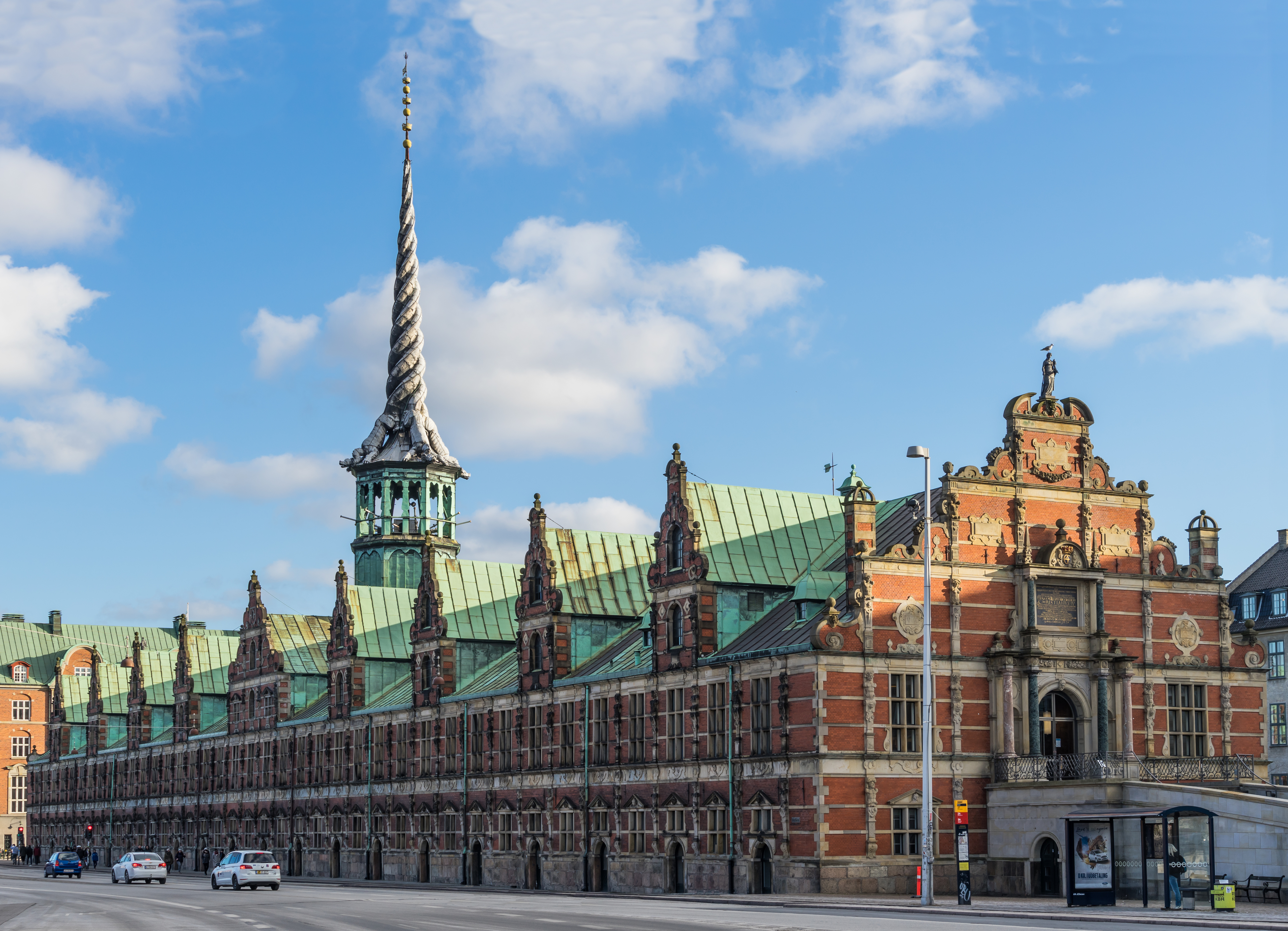
Copenhagen, Denmark

The Black Cobra gang has been considered one of the largest criminal gangs in Denmark since 2000, and their gang members are commonly identified as being immigrants from Turkey, Palestine, Iraq and Albania. The Black Cobra Gang currently operate in all Danish cities along with parts of Norway, and in 2009, the gang entered into locations of Sweden, specifically the suburbs Tensta and Rinkeby in Stockholm. The Black Cobra gang has been distinguished as an organised criminal gang rather than a criminal youth group, as the European Forum for Urban Security defines a gang to be a 'durable, street oriented youth group whose involvement in illegal activity is part of its group identity.

The Black Cobra gang identify themselves by wearing a black and white shirt with a cobra snake emblem on the front, and they hold ties to a Youth Gang called The Black Scorpions. The Black Cobra gang follow certain rules and conducts on their actions, and have a system of delegated leadership power, if gang members do not comply with their rules, they risk facing membership expulsion, or a fine. Various factors have been found to contribute towards a member's decision to join the gang, such as socio-economic, schooling, family circumstances and immigration. It has been studied that reasons to join a gang are connected to societal marginalisation and exclusion, and often linked to anti-immigration sentiments. One argument on the cause for an individual joining a gang, is that it is believed that individuals of immigration background face negative scrutiny from society. The Black Cobra gang's recruitment process originally involved public advertising to young males. Within this process, higher ranking gang members would explain reasons as to why new members should join. This public approach concluded after police involvement. A new recruitment strategy was adopted in 2010, which involved new members joining via reference from a current gang member., or recruited through close-knit relationships such as family members, or members of an extended social circle.

== Notable criminal activity ==
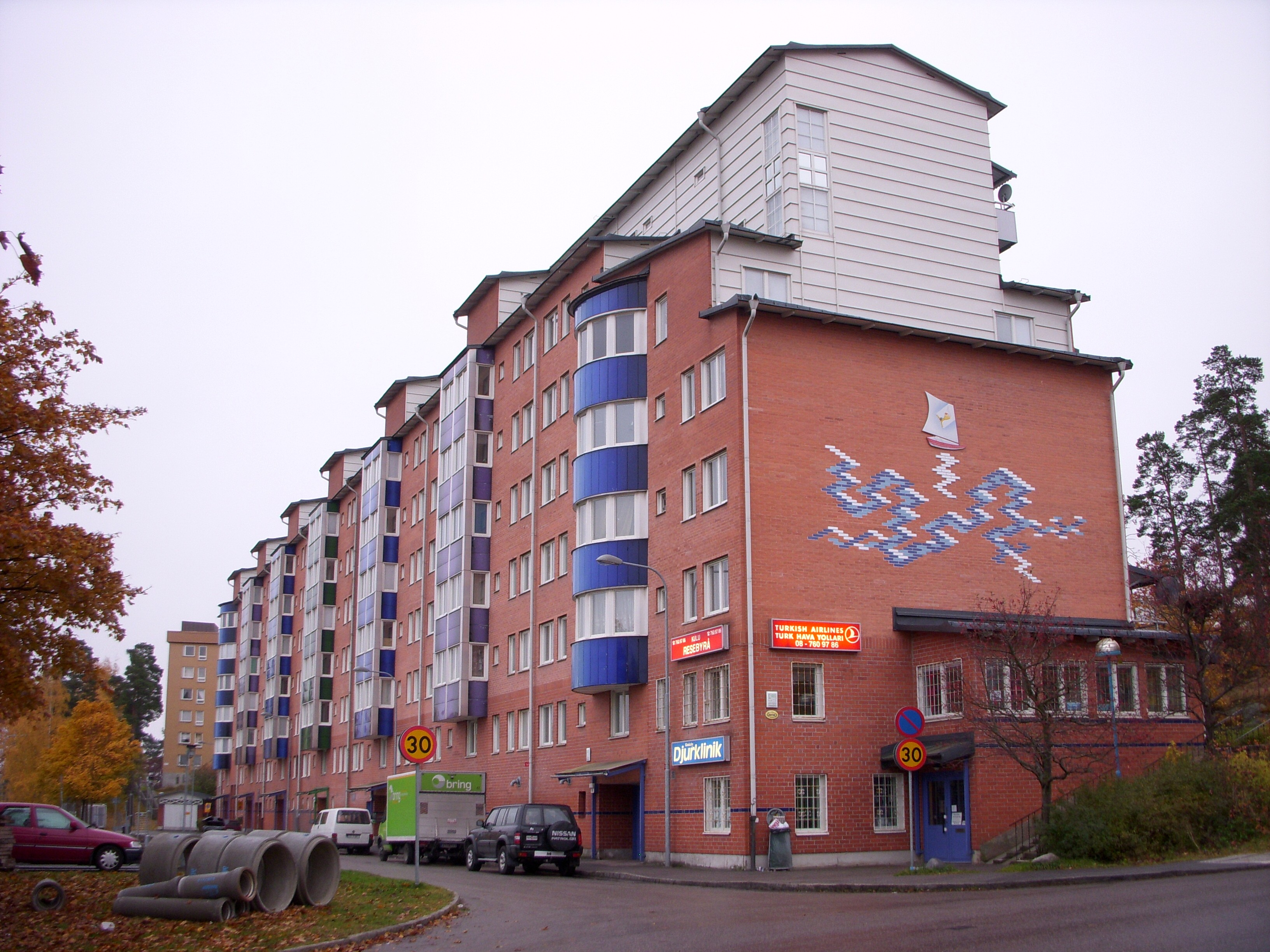
Rinkeby, Sweden

The Black Cobra gang identifies with illegal activity including crimes of drug dealing, violence, burglaries, racketeering and manslaughter. In 2010, it was found that there was an increase in crime of 40% from immigrant youths after they joined a gang. It has been found that gang members are substantially involved in illicit drug sales, as cannabis sales contribute highly to revenue generated by Denmark gangs. Drug use within the gang is largely prevalent as a result of low incomes. The Black Cobra gang's street culture is characterised by violence, drug dealing, and conflict with other gangs, as drug dealing provides the material base for their lifestyle, along with creating a more formally organised operation. The conflict between gangs creates violence. This conflict occurs due to territorial disputes. In 2007, Danish and international analysts saw a rise in gang warfare between traditional Danish gangs such as the Hells Angels, and the new immigrant gang Black Cobra. The gangs fought largely over control of the drug, prostitution, and human trafficking trades. According to Canadian reporter Rachel Mendleson, approximately 60 people had died over this gang warfare in Denmark in 2007, and that 1,500 members were involved in gang activities by 2008. In 2013, Sky News reported that Denmark police had arrested 32 bikers and gang members suspected of murder and assault. This was conducted in a massive crackdown on organised crime, as Copenhagen had seen a series of drive by shootings and stabbings throughout 2013. These crimes were suspected by police to be conducted by the Black Cobra gang, Hells Angels and Bandidos biker groups over control in the drug market around the area.

In March 2009, members of the Black Cobra were arrested in Malmö for extorting a company for protection money and trafficking illegal drugs. The Black Cobra gang stole 120 boxes of almond tarts, punch rolls, apple crowns and brownies from a delivery truck in southern Sweden in March 2010.

== Association and rivalry with other gangs ==
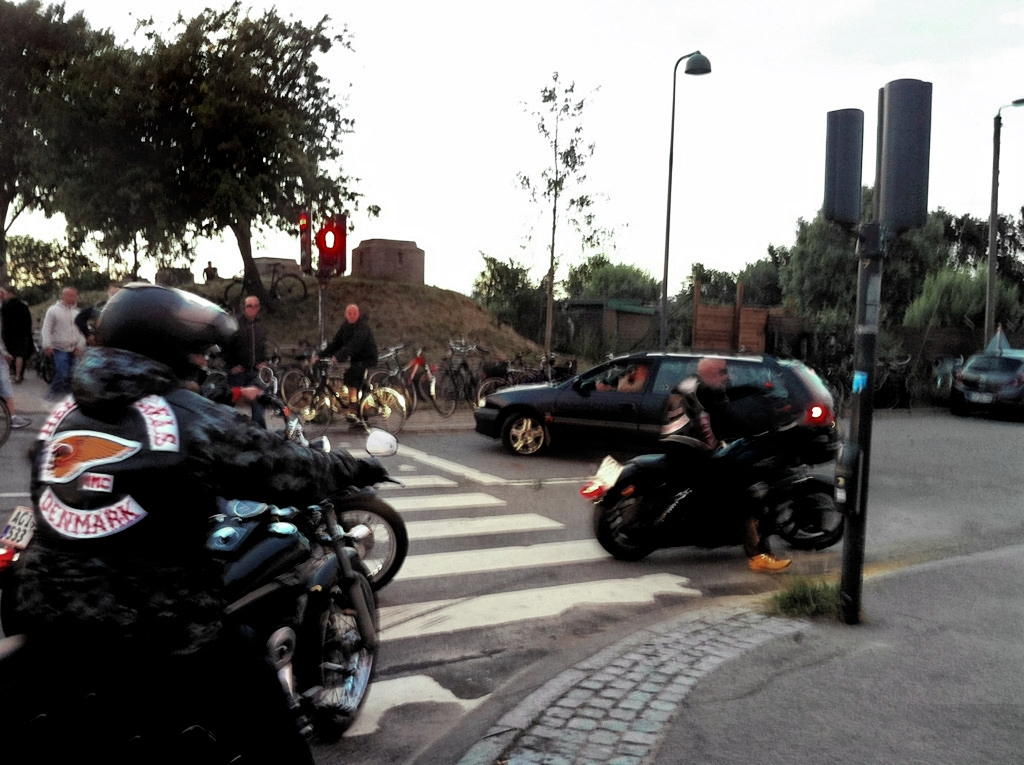
Danish Hells Angels.

The Black Cobra gang has been associated with gangs such as the Black Scorpions and Black Army within Denmark, and have seen to have rivalry with Danish gangs such as the Hells Angels and Bandidos motorcycle gangs, and the Vaerebros. The Black Cobra gang's main rival is the Hells Angels, as in 2007 there was a rise in gang warfare between the two gangs, stemming from conflict over control of the drug and prostitution trade. In 2013, Danish police reported there was 232 shootings, 18 deaths and 198 people were wounded suspected to have begun between the Hells Angels and their youth gang AK81, and Black Cobra, the Bloods and Blagardsplads gangs, all referred to as immigrant gangs. Reasons behind the conflict between Hells Angels and Black Cobra have been linked to anti-immigrant, and racist sentiments towards the Black Cobra, along with control over territory, the drug trade, the prostitution trade, and human trafficking trade. Initial police focus towards gang activity was centred on biker gang related crimes, which allowed for the Black Cobra gang to take over 'markets and territories' which they regularly fought over. In response to the Danish gang conflict, police targeted and incarcerated individuals seen to be leaders and driving forces of these street gangs. Police reported that the crimes committed during gang conflicts typically involves homicide, violence, robbery, narcotics crime, smuggling of goods, intimidation and various forms of financial crime. In 2016, approximately 1,400 people were associated with a gang or motorcycle gang in Denmark alone.

A war between the Black Cobra and Bandidos erupted in Køge after Oruc Türkoglu, a leading Black Cobra figure in the city, was stabbed and wounded on 29 January 2013. A few days later, shots were fired at the home of another Black Cobra member southwest of Copenhagen, although no one was injured. In the early hours of 6 February 2013, a prospective Bandidos member was attacked by three Black Cobra members and shot in the knee at his home in Herfølge. Later that day, a tattoo parlor in Køge associated with the Bandidos was riddled with gunfire by two young men on a moped. A fifteen-year-old Black Cobra member was charged with attempted murder after police raided twenty-three properties and recovered two firearms during a crackdown on the gang environment on 28 February 2013. A truce was reached and the conflict was brought to an end after four representatives from each gang met on 29 March 2013.

In Sweden, the Black Cobra became involved in a conflict with the Chicanos, a Bandidos support club, after the Chicanos attempted to recruit Black Cobra members. On 5 April 2013, members of both gangs engaged in a riot in Trollhättan.

== Government and police control ==
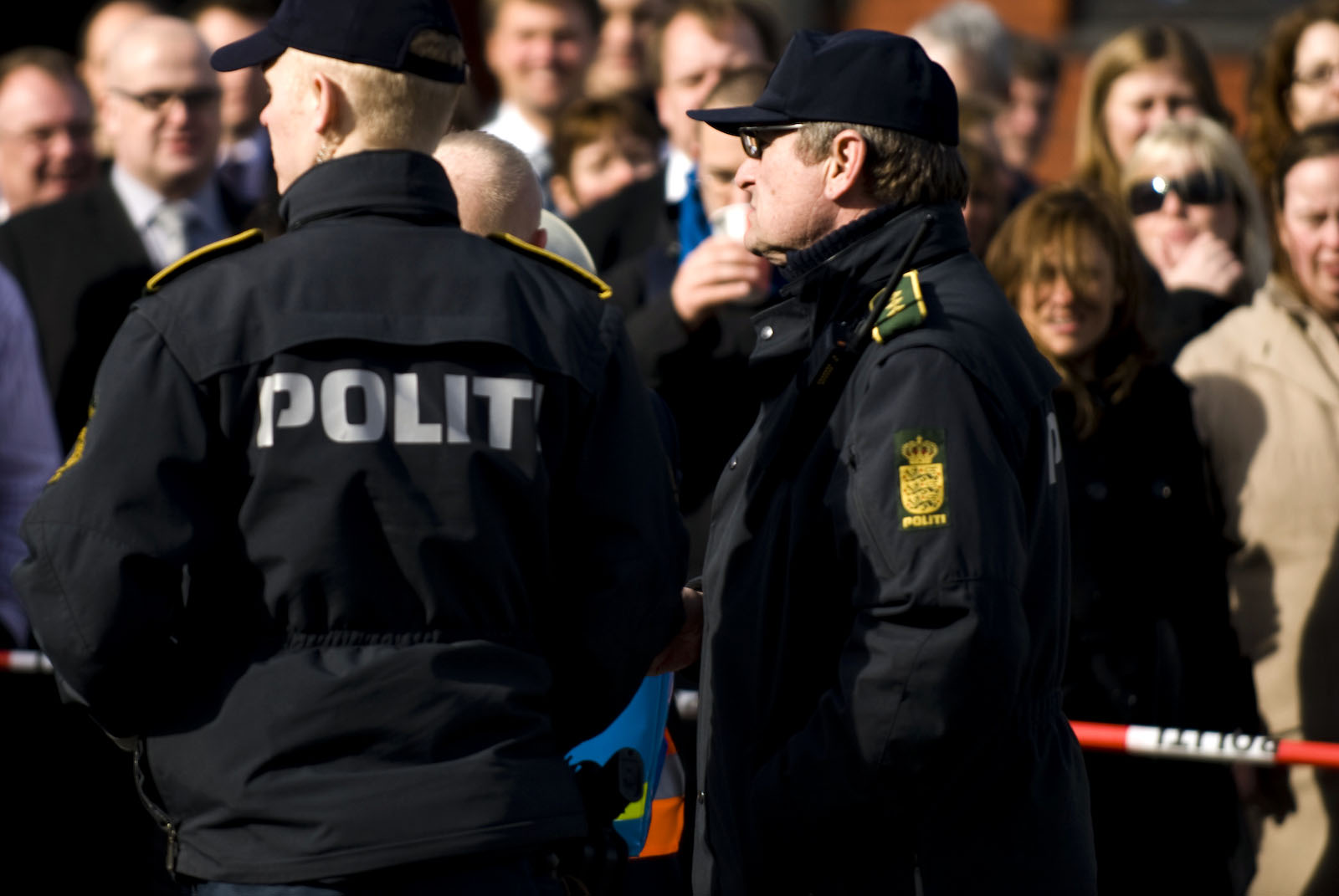
Danish police

The Government and police have taken various legislative and policy approaches in attempt to suppress gang activity in Denmark, Sweden and Norway. The Norwegian penal law definition of organised crime was implemented in 2003, being that 'a structured association, established over a period of time, of more than two persons acting in concert with a view to committing offences which are punishable by deprivation of liberty or a detention order'. This law allowed courts to increase penalties towards gangs and organised criminal groups and implement heavier sentencing if a crime is proved to be gang-related. The Danish government attempted to ban outlawed motorcycle groups and gangs in both 1998, and 2010, however both occasions were unsuccessful, as the ban was seen to be unconstitutional due to legal tradition preventing laws related to specific organisations of persons.

The Danish police has seen to be the principal driver in preventing gang recruitment, and uncovering gang related financial crimes, such as extortion, tax evasion, social security fraud and the infiltration of legitimate businesses. The most recent policy change in Denmark was implemented in July 2014, a strategy called 'A solid grip on gangs', targeting outlawed motorcycle groups, and local gangs such as the Black Cobra. The new legislation increased penalties for the possession of fire-arms, and allowed courts to double the penalties for specific gang related crimes. The legislation also includes the ability to revoke the parole of gang members who actively participate in ongoing violent conflict, in attempt to prevent gang warfare. The 'solid grip on gangs' strategy also focuses on prevention and desistance programs, as the legislative package introduced several programs allowing police to shut down facilities hosting gang activity, specifically, 'buying out' their properties or denying permission to use a particular property if it is suspected to be used for gang related crimes.

In 2009 and 2013, the Denmark Government launched three specific legislative packages, the first one aimed at addressing certain crimes such as street shootings and violent incidents related to gangs and conflict between individual criminal groups. Within this package, it introduced a provision of double penalties, including extended prison sentences in attempt to deter gang membership. The package further includes zone restrictions, being that police can issue a ban on entering and residing in areas with a radius of 500 metres. The government further responded towards the gang activity by introducing the 'Stockholm Gang intervention and Prevention Project in 2009 – 2012. This project acts to implement barriers to gang activity in Sweden through gathering information and structuring an operational criminal intelligence unit from the backdrop of what was currently known about street gangs, such as the Black Cobra's recruiting process and rivalry with other gangs. In 2007, the Copenhagen police bureau called for international and Danish analyst focus on the rise in gang warfare, to which they found approximately fourteen gangs were operating in Denmark, and estimated one thousand gang members. In 2019, a news article written by The Guardian reported the actions taken by police on gang control following thirteen explosions in and around Copenhagen since February 2019. The Swedish police conducted stop checks at ferry ports, trains and vehicles in Copenhagen areas, to which National police officer, Lene Frank, commented that it aimed at 'preventing serious and organised crime from spreading', and that 'officers will be focused on cross- border crime, including explosives, weapons, and drugs'. The article further includes that the Swedish government has announced a 34-point plan to combat the gang-related violence, introducing policy measures to make it easier for police to search suspect's homes, and read encrypted phone messages.
