= AK81 =

- Founded: 2007
- Founded by: Jørn Nielsen
- Founding location: Copenhagen, Denmark
- Years active: 2007-present
- Territory: Scandinavia
- Ethnicity: Danish, Swedes, Norwegians, Icelanders
- Membership (est.): 300 (in 2007)
- Criminal activities: drug trafficking, gun trafficking
- Allies: Hells Angels
- Rivals: Immigrant gangs (especially the gang from Blågårdsplads): Black Cobra, Black Scorpions, Loyal to Familia, Black Jackets

AK81 are a Danish street gang involved in drug and gun trafficking as well as proxenetism They are a "support gang" (also referred to as "puppet clubs" by law enforcement) of the Hells Angels MC although members are not required to own a motorcycle or wear a patched kutte-style club vests. Because of this, along with high-running racial tensions, they are recruiting much faster than the Hells Angels in Denmark, which makes them one of the most influential and powerful crime groups in Europe. AK stands for "Altid Klar", which is Danish for Always Ready, and 81 is synonymous with the letters HA - the abbreviation of "Hells Angels". The gang was formed in 2007 to combat immigrant street gangs in a feud over the lucrative illegal hashish market. This means that they essentially provide muscle for the Hells Angels. They were estimated to have around 300 members in 2007.

The war emerged as a conflict between the Hells Angels and AK81 against united gangs of immigrants.

On 12 January 2008, an AK81 member stabbed two immigrants on Munkemøllestræde in Odense and was sequentially arrested. The man was convicted and sentenced on 25 May 2008 to one and a half years in prison. AK81 members clashed with immigrant groups at the Odense courthouse during the man's trial. AK81 members again fought with immigrants at the district court in Odense on 12 June 2008 when an AK81 member allegedly threatened an immigrant with a knife. On 5 August 2008, the Hells Angels' newly-opened clubhouse on Petersmindevej in Odense was strafed with gunfire.

The first major incident in the gang war came on 14 August 2008 when 16 immigrant gang members were fired upon by suspected AK81 assailants in front of a pizzeria in Tingbjerg. One of the immigrants, 19-year-old Osman Nuri Dogan, was fatally shot. An AK81 member was arrested for questioning in relation to the shooting but was subsequently released due to a lack of evidence. Police believe the shooting was carried out as retaliation for the beating of an AK81 member by immigrants at a pizzeria.

On 1 September 2008, a large group of immigrants attacked the Hells Angels clubhouse on Svanevej in the Nordvest quarter of Copenhagen. Several cars fled the area when police arrived, and an undetonated grenade was found at the scene. On 3 September 2008, three young immigrants were arrested shortly after eleven gunshots were fired on a street on Amager. Two cars involved in the shooting were subsequently located outside the Hells Angels clubhouse on Lindgreens Allé. Police searched the clubhouse, finding three firearms and arresting eleven bikers. On 4 September 2008, between 100 and 150 Hells Angels marched through the streets of Aarhus during the city's festive week in a show of force.

On 8 October 2008, there was a shoot-out between AK81 members and a group of immigrants in the Nørrebro district of Copenhagen, during which one man was injured. An AK81 man began shooting at a group of immigrant gang members, who took cover before calling for back-up who arrived carrying guns. The next day, immigrant gang members attacked AK81 members in Odense which led to the police arresting fourteen people.

The violence has also gone beyond the streets and into prisons. In August 2009, a mass brawl between immigrant gangs and Hells Angels broke out at Vridsløselille Prison. And on 12 August 2009, three men linked to AK81 and the Hells Angels were jailed for beating up two immigrants at a club in Hellerup in April of that year.
