= Rødovre Municipality =

Rødovre Municipality Rødovre Kommune (Danish)
- Municipality
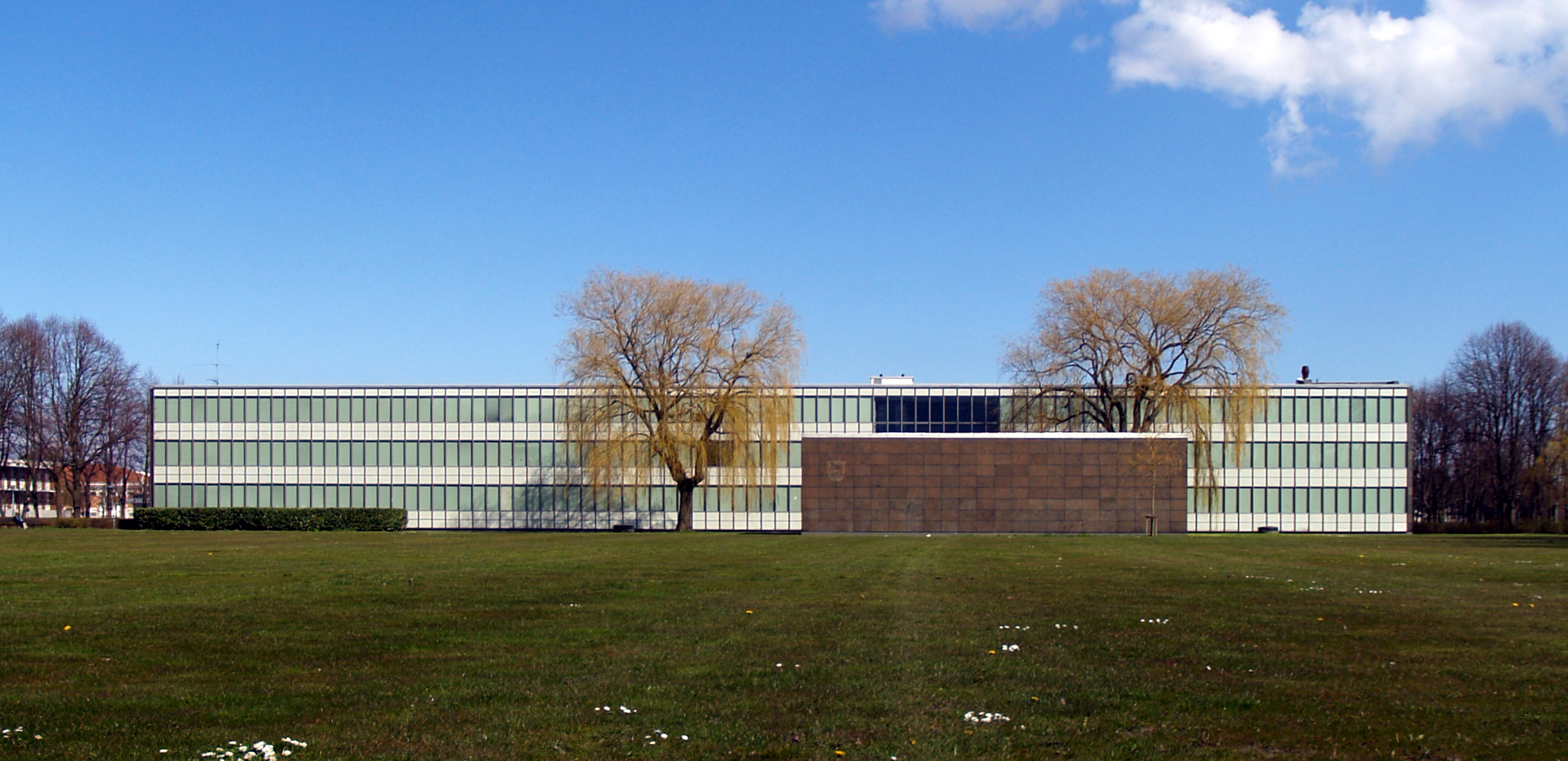
- City hall

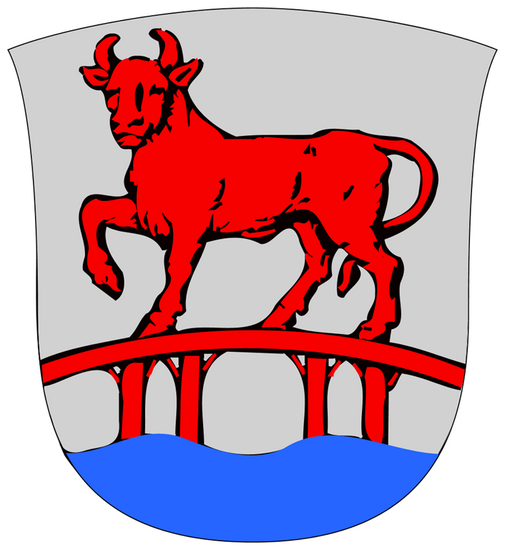
- Coat of arms

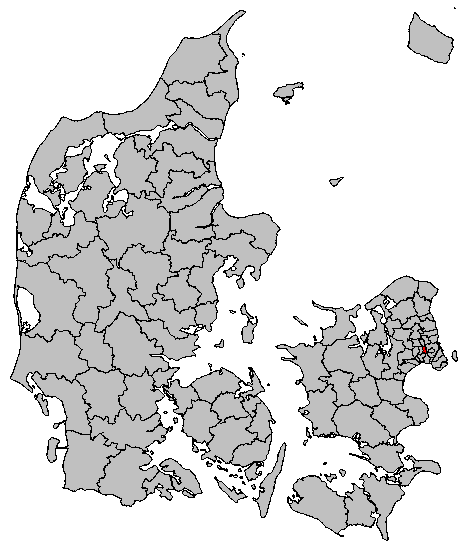
- Coordinates: 55°40′53″N 12°27′18″E
- Country: Denmark
- Region: Hovedstaden
- Established: 1 January 1901
- Seat: Rødovre

Government
  - Mayor: Britt Jensen (S)

Area
  - Total: 12.20 km^{2} (4.71 sq mi)

Population (1 January 2026)
  - Total: 45,138
  - Density: 3,700/km^{2} (9,583/sq mi)
- Time zone: UTC+1 (CET)
  - Summer (DST): UTC+2 (CEST)
- Postal code: 2610
- Municipal code: 175
- Website: www.rk.dk

Rødovre Municipality (Danish: Rødovre Kommune) is a municipality (Danish, kommune) in the Capital Region on the island of Zealand in eastern Denmark. Its mayor is Britt Jensen. She is a member of the Social Democrats (Socialdemokraterne) political party who hold a majority of seats in the council.

== History ==
The municipality was created in 1901 when the parish of Rødovre was split from Brønshøj-Rødovre parish; the Brønshøj part was simultaneously annexed by the city of Copenhagen.

The municipality reforms of 1970 and of 2007 both left the boundaries of Rødovre unchanged.

Erik Nielsen was replaced by Britt Jensen as mayor by a vote in the municipal council 19 March 2020 because the former made use of an official car although he only had one kilometer to work. She was the only candidate.

== Geography ==
The municipality covers an area of 12 km^{2}, all part of the larger conurbation of Copenhagen.

Neighboring municipalities are Copenhagen to the east, Herlev to the north, Glostrup to the west, and Brøndby and Hvidovre to the south.

== Demography ==
As of 1 January 2020 the municipality had 40,652 inhabitants of which 101 had no fixed address. The population number was 36,144 1 January 2008. Demographically Rødovre is a multi-cultured mixed suburb with no larger ethnic group of people. People from many different countries and middle-class/lower-class inhabitants live next to each other.

== Sport ==
Rødovre is the home town of the ice-hockey team Rødovre Mighty Bulls.

== Politics ==
=== Municipal council ===
Rødovre's municipal council consists of 19 members, elected every four years.

Below are the municipal councils elected since the Municipal Reform of 2007.

Election	Party							Total seats	Turnout	Elected mayor
Election	A	B	C	F	O	V	Ø	Total seats	Turnout	Elected mayor
2005	11	1	1	1	2	2	1	19	64.0%	Erik Nielsen (A)
2009	11		1	3	3	1		19	60.4%	Erik Nielsen (A)
2013	9		2	1	3	2	2	19	67.4%	Erik Nielsen (A)
2017	11		3	1	1	1	2	19	65.0%	Erik Nielsen (A)
Data from Kmdvalg.dk 2005, 2009, 2013 and 2017

== Curiosities ==
- The Danish TV television show Rita is filmed in Islev, Rødovre.
- Peter Lundin a Danish serial killer, killed and dismembered his partner and her two sons while they were living in Rødovre.
- Michael Stützer, guitarist of Thrash Metal band Artillery is local

== Twin towns ==
Järvenpää, Finland	Lørenskog, Norway	Täby, Sweden

== See also ==
- Listed buildings and structures in Rødovre Municipality
- Rødovre station
