= Frankfurt mafia =

Crime group from Veles, North Macedonia

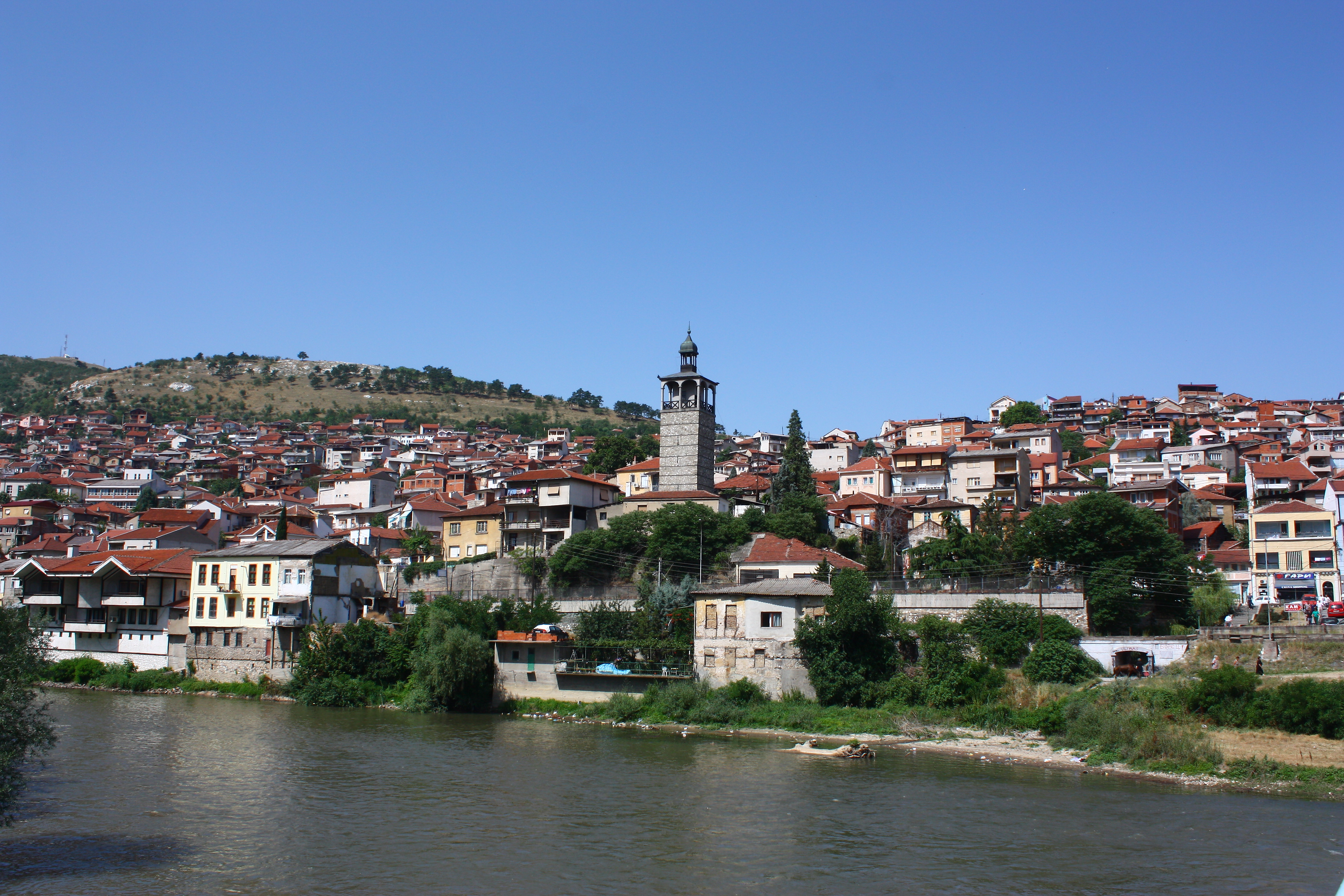
- Frankfurt Mafia is from Veles, North Macedonia
- Founded: Mid-1990s
- Named after: City of Frankfurt in Germany
- Founding location: Veles, North Macedonia
- Territory: North Macedonia, Austria, Germany
- Ethnicity: Macedonian
- Activities: Heroin trafficking, money laundering

The Frankfurt mafia is the attributed name of a crime group from Veles, North Macedonia, that was involved in the heroin trade in Frankfurt, Germany, and Vienna, Austria.

== Foundation and activity ==
The crime group was founded in the mid-1990s by people from Veles. The group mainly consisted of Macedonian citizens from Veles. Boris Rhein, Hessen's Interior Minister, stated that the Frankfurt mafia held about 90% of the drug trade market in Frankfurt for a couple of years. The Frankfurt mafia controlled 19 out of 24 blocks in Vienna's drug trade using intelligence methods. Per officials, the group had taken control of the heroin trade in Frankfurt and Vienna in a short period of time by violently forcing out rival gangs.

In September 2010, a leader of the group was killed in a fish restaurant. In an international operation, the Macedonian, German and Austrian police arrested around 400 people in 2010. Per police, 170kg of heroin in Germany and 26.3kg in Austria were seized. Macedonian police launched their operation in Veles and Gevgelija, Sveti Nikole and Skopje. Around 350 police officers took part in raids on the homes, restaurants and cafes. Per the police, there was a large amount of money, drugs and other items. The Criminal Court in Skopje gave the leaders of the group prison and suspended sentences in 2012. In a joint operation in 2013, Macedonian and German police arrested around 50 people. Per Macedonian police, three persons remained at large. Macedonian police arrested people in Skopje, Veles, Bitola, Sveti Nikole, Štip and Struga. According to the Global Initiative Against Transnational Organized Crime: "Although 450 people ended up behind bars, the group is still active and has simply changed tactics."

== See also ==
- List of criminal enterprises, gangs, and syndicates
