= Rødovre =

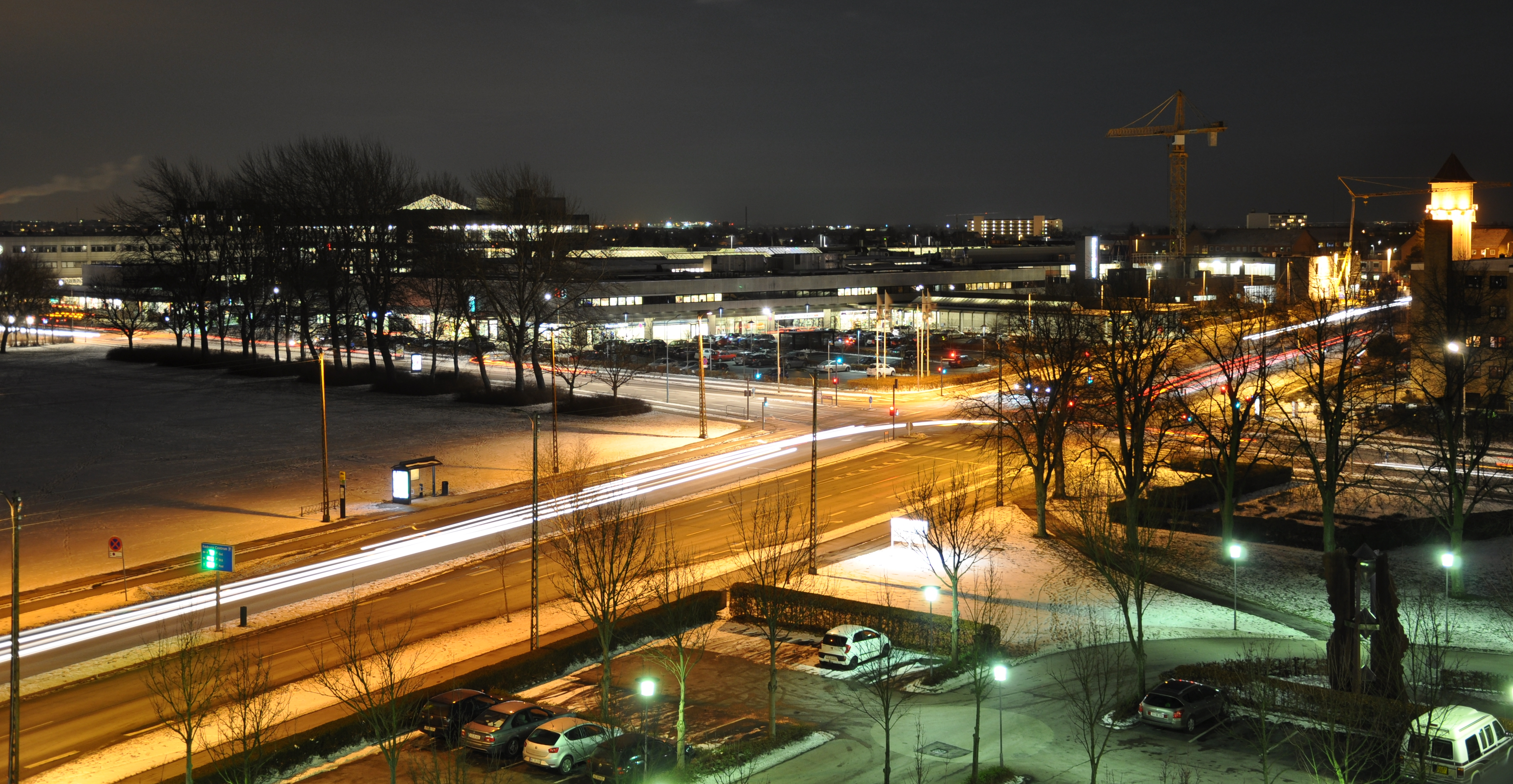
- Rødovre by night
- Interactive map of Rødovre
- Location within Greater Copenhagen Location within Denmark
- Coordinates: 55°40′53″N 12°27′18″E
- Country: Denmark
- Region: Capital (Hovedstaden)
- Municipality: Rødovre

Government
  - Mayor: Britt Jensen

Area (co-extensive with its municipality)
  - Total: 12.12 km^{2} (4.68 sq mi)

Population (2019)
  - Total: 40,052
- Time zone: UTC+1 (Central Europe Time)
  - Summer (DST): UTC+2
- Postal code: 2610
- Website: www.rk.dk

Rødovre (Danish pronunciation: [ˈʁœðˌɒwʁə]) is a town in eastern Denmark, seat of the Rødovre Municipality, in the Region Hovedstaden. The town's population 1 January 2019 was 39,907, and in addition 145 persons had no fixed address, which made up a total of 40,052 in the municipality as a whole. Rødovre is part of the urban area of Copenhagen.

== History ==
Until 1901, the town was part of the parish of Brønshøj-Rødovre. Vanløse was also part of that parish. In that year, Rødovre was created as independent municipality and Brønshøj was simultaneously annexed by the city of Copenhagen.

== Geography ==
Rødovre, co-extensive with the territory of its municipality, is in the central-western suburbs of Copenhagen, bordering Copenhagen Municipality to the east, Glostrup to the west, Herlev to the north, and Brøndby and Hvidovre to the south.

The town mostly comprises suburban homes in the south and light industrial areas in the north. It has several smaller green areas, including Schweizerdalsparken, and larger areas such as Vestvolden and Damhussøen lie inside Copenhagen Municipality adjacent to and forming the border with Rødovre. There are six public schools in the town, one technical school and a private school.

Rødovre Centrum is a shopping mall. Viften - meaning "The Fan" - which besides being a café, is a cinema and a combined concert hall/theatre. There are also many smaller business districts such as Damhustorvet and Islev Torv. Damhustorvet is a traffic hub and small business district in south-eastern Rødovre, immediately before the border to Copenhagen.

== Sports and culture ==
Every Tuesday, the local newspaper "Rødovre Lokal Nyt" (Rødovre Local News) is delivered by mail to all residents. Radio Rødovre broadcasts on 105.9 FM, and sometimes local TV is broadcast via Kanal København.

There is an Ice Hockey arena, home of Rødovre Mighty Bulls, two smaller football stadiums (home of BK Avarta and BK Rødovre, respectively) and one train station, served by line B of the commuter S-trains. The Rødovre Mighty Bulls are a professional ice hockey team which plays in the top Danish League, Metal Ligaen.

- Rødovre Centrum, the local shopping mall, was the first of its kind in Denmark.
- The town hall was designed by Arne Jacobsen.
- Henry Heerup had his studio in Rødovre, and made most of his well-known works here.
- Benjamin Christensen had his cinema Rio Bio in Rødovre.

== Notable people ==
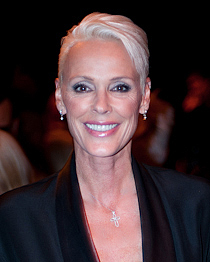
Brigitte Nielsen, 2010

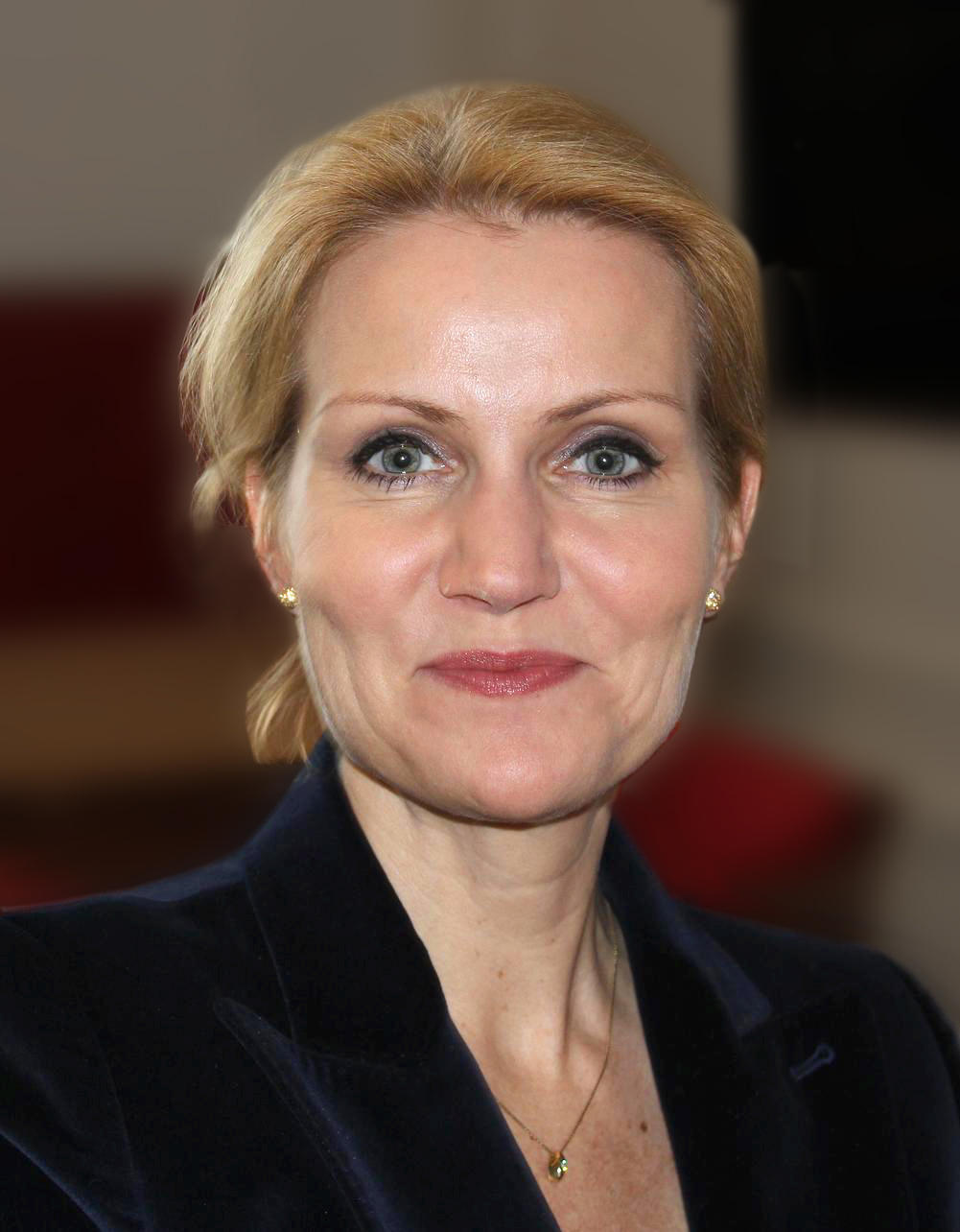
Helle Thorning-Schmidt, 2010

- Henry Heerup (1907–1993) a painter and sculptor, worked in Rødovre and willed a collection of his work to the municipality
- Kim Bendix Petersen (born 1956) stage name King Diamond, singer songwriter for Mercyful Fate and King Diamond
- Dennis Jürgensen (born 1961) a Danish writers for kids and young adults, lives in Rødovre
- Brigitte Nielsen (born 1963) actress, musician and television personality
- Tine Susanne Miksch Roed (born 1964) Deputy director-general at the Confederation of Danish Industry since 2015
- Helle Thorning-Schmidt (born 1966) former Prime minister of Denmark
- Jakob Ejersbo (1968–2008) a Danish journalist and writer, wrote Nordkraft, Trilogi om Afrika
- Anders W. Berthelsen (born 1969) a Danish actor
- Nikolaj Lie Kaas (born 1973) a Danish actor
- Kian Rosenberg Larsson (born 1992), stage name Gilli a Danish rapper and actor
- Riffi Haddaoui festival owner and former soccer player

=== Sport ===
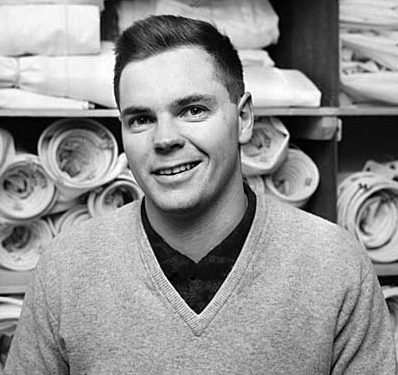
Hans Fogh, 1964

- Hans Fogh (1938–2014) an Olympic sailor in six Olympic games (1960 (silver) , 1964, 1968, 1972 Denmark, 1976 and 1984 (bronze) Canada), and sailmaker.
- Michael Schäfer (born 1959) a Danish former footballer and now manager, played 482 games for Lyngby BK.
- Søren Henriksen (born 1963) a former Danish cricketer and Denmark captain.
- Ken Frost (born 1967) a Danish cyclist, team bronze medallist at the 1992 Summer Olympics.
- Ole Bjur (born 1968) a Danish former footballer, played 384 matches for Brøndby IF.
- Marc Rieper (born 1968) a former footballer and manager with 305 club caps and 61 for Denmark. He also played in the UEFA Euro 1996 and the 1998 FIFA World Cup.
- Martin Retov (born 1980) a Danish football coach and former player with 484 club caps.
- Jannik Hansen (born 1986) a former professional ice hockey player.
- Lars Eller (born 1989) a Danish professional ice hockey forward and the first Danish Stanley Cup winner in NHL history.
- Michelle Karvinen (born 1990) a Danish-Finnish professional ice hockey player
- Nikolaj Krag Christensen (born 1998) a Danish professional ice hockey forward.

== Picture gallery ==
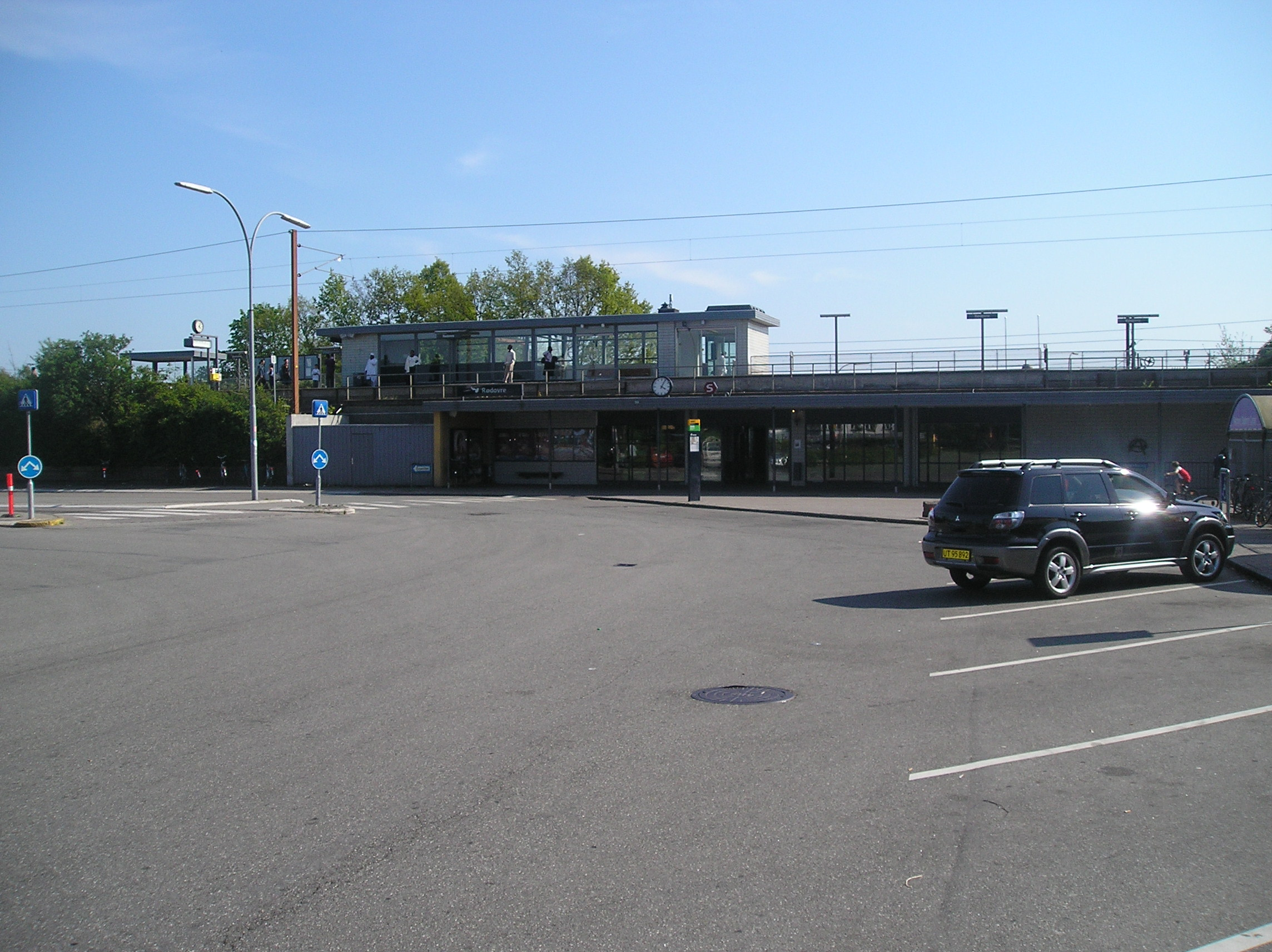
Rødovre railway station

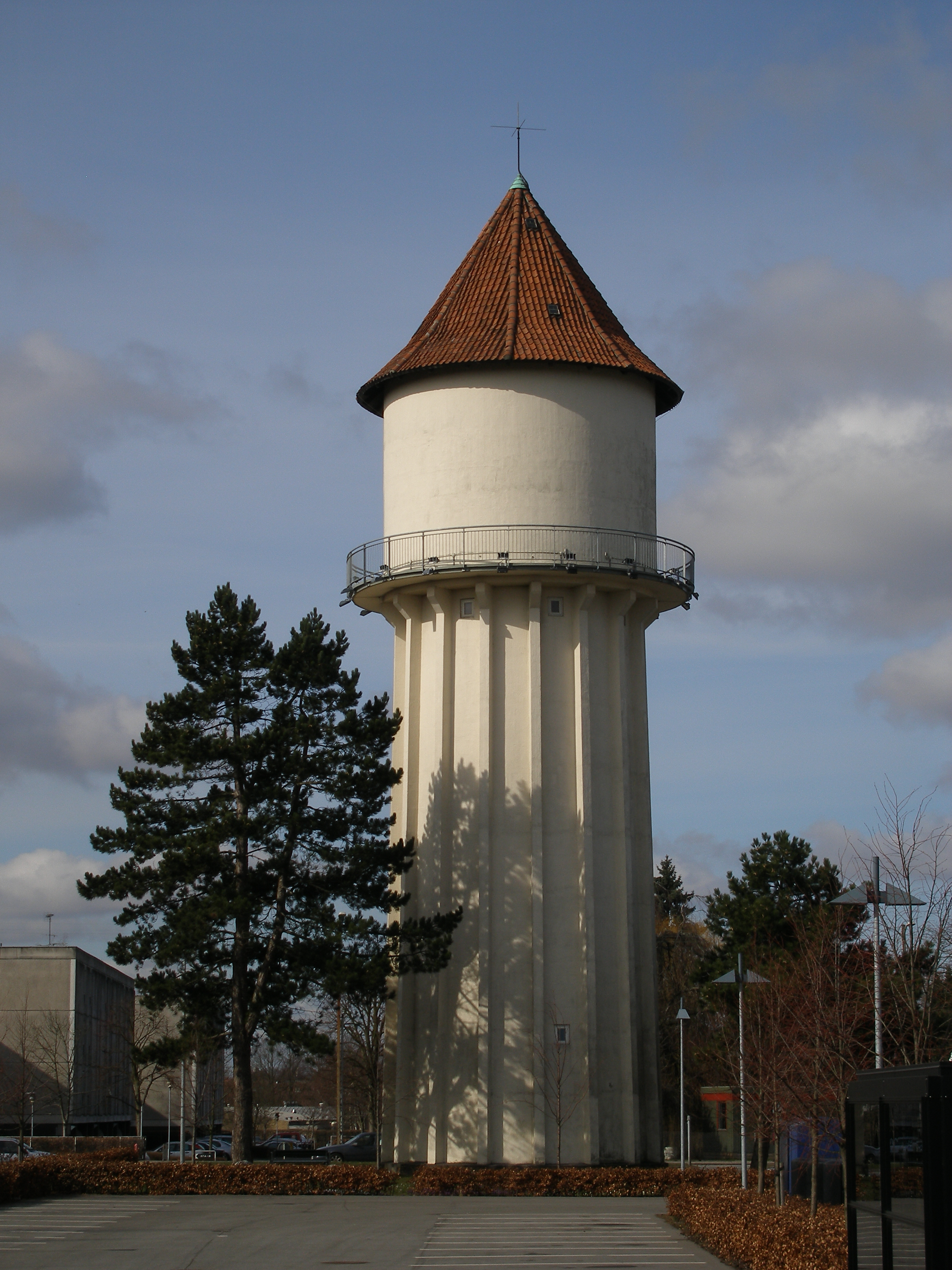
Vandtårn Tårnvej Rødovre

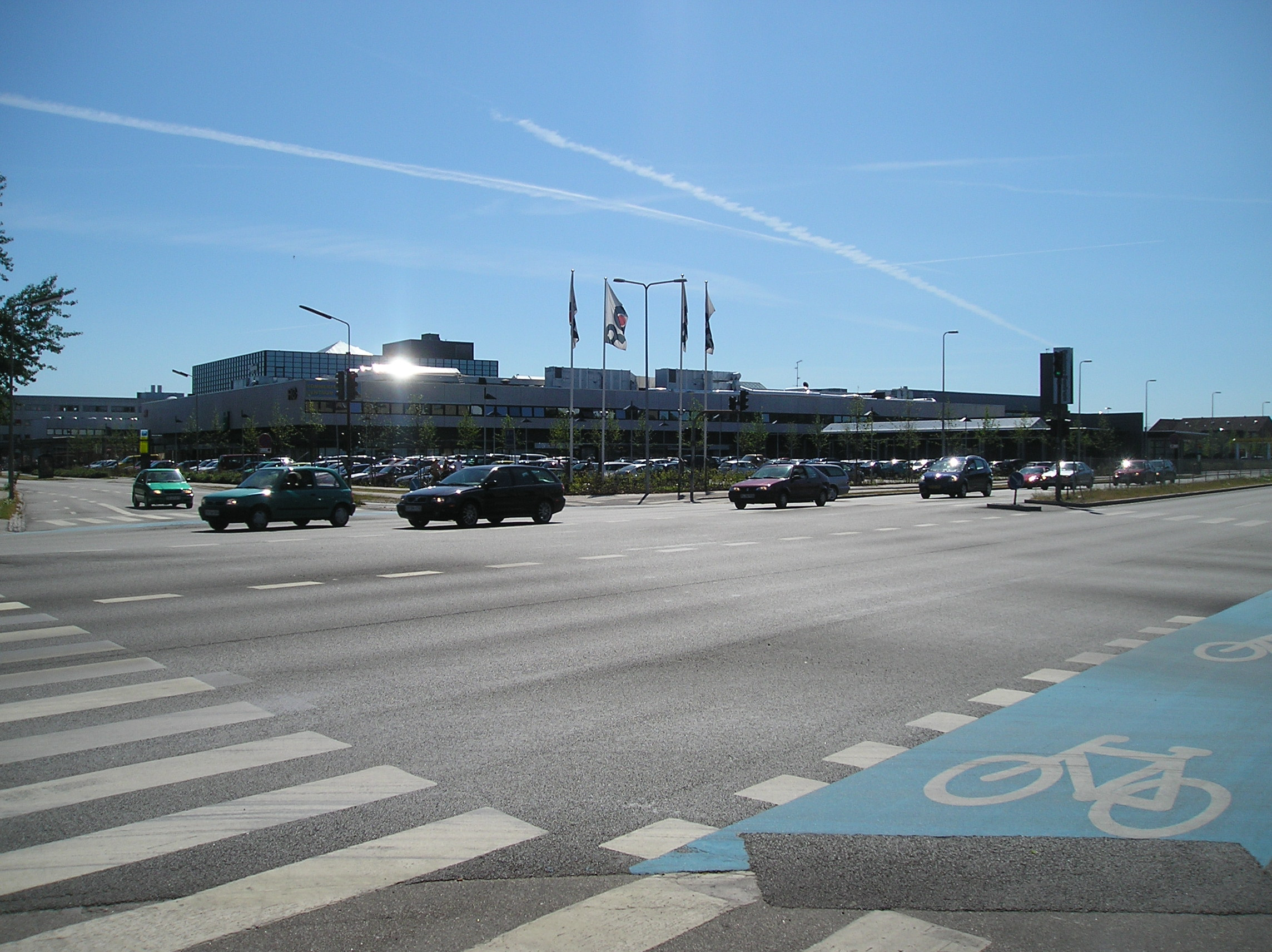
Rødovre Centrum shopping mall

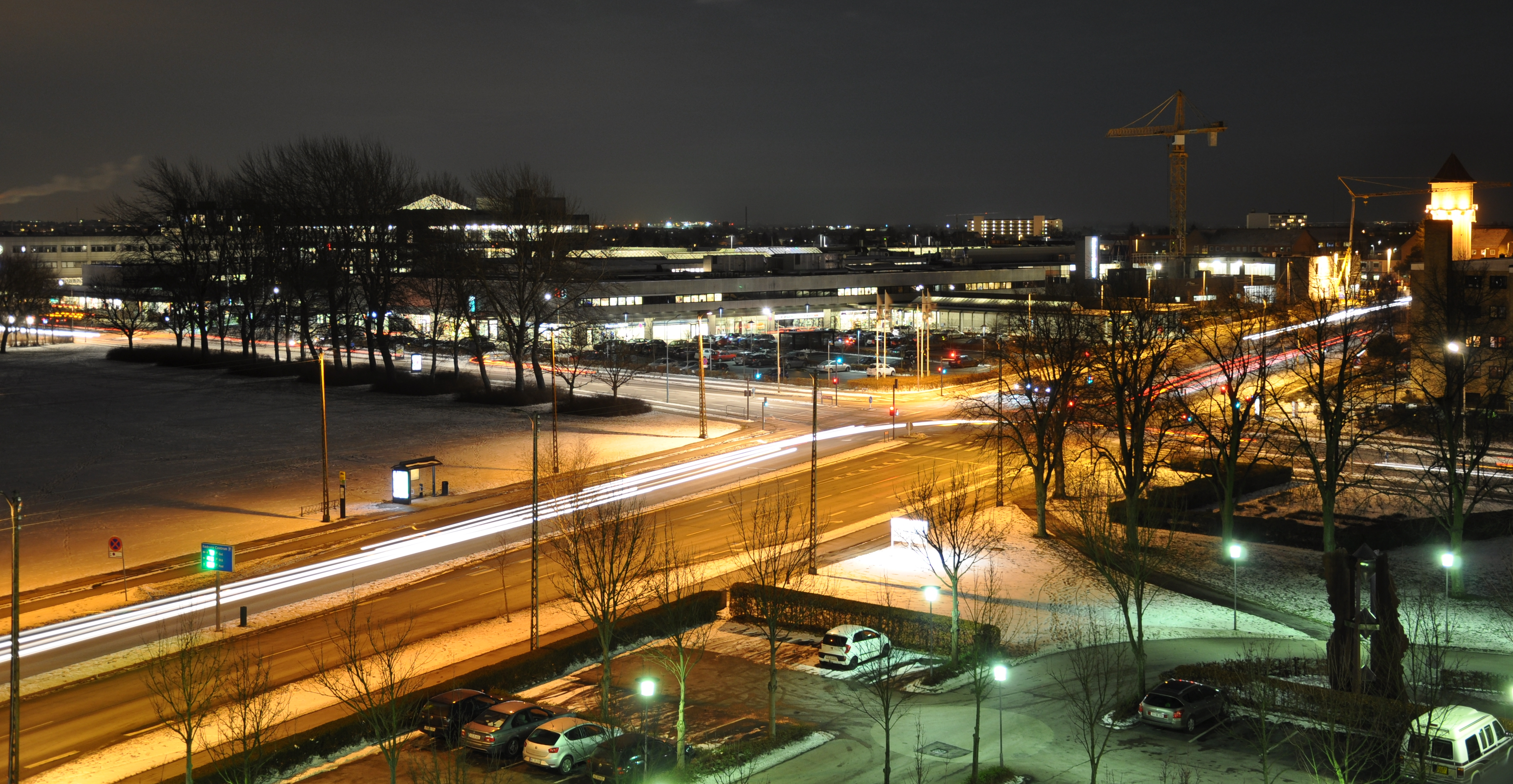
Rødovre by night
