= 1993 Tauranga by-election =

New Zealand by-election

- 17 April 1993
- Turnout: 12,631 (49.08%)
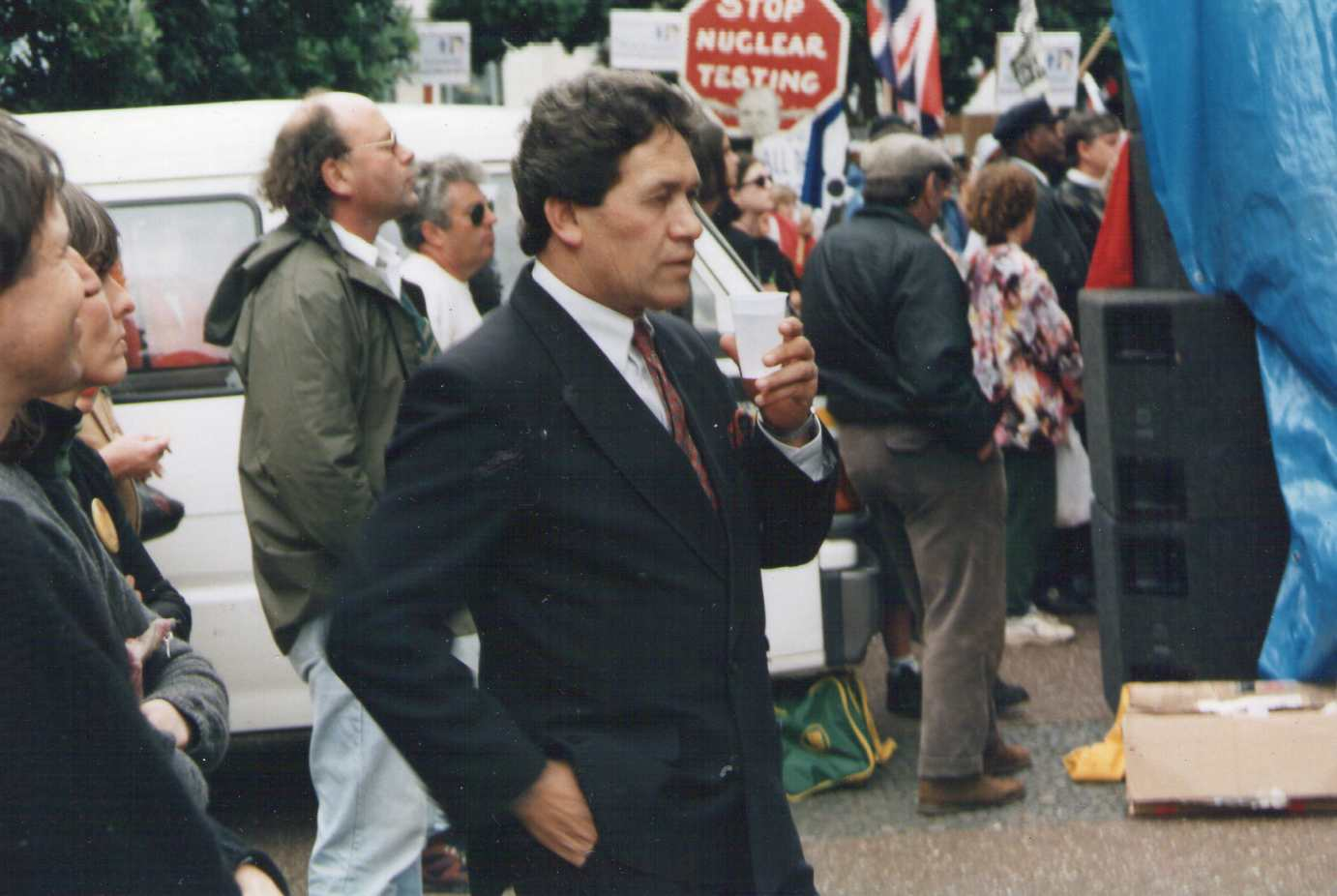
| Candidate | Winston Peters | Greg Pittams |
| Party | Independent | McGillicuddy Serious |
| Popular vote | 11,458 | 271 |
| Percentage | 90.71% | 2.15% |
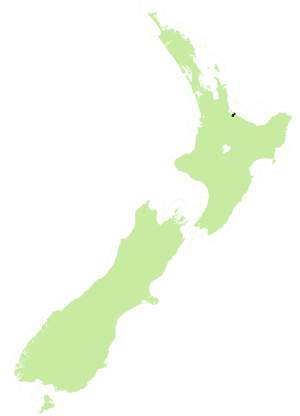
- Tauranga in relation to New Zealand
Member before election
Winston Peters
National
Elected Member
Winston Peters
Independent

A by-election was held in the New Zealand electorate of Tauranga on 17 April 1993. The by-election was prompted by the resignation from parliament of sitting MP Winston Peters, who had been increasingly at odds with his National Party colleagues and resigned both from his party and from Parliament. He contested the seat as an independent.

== Background ==
None of the major parties contested this election, claiming the upcoming general election was close enough to make the by-election nothing but a publicity stunt. The National Party did not propose a candidate to replace Peters. As expected, Peters won a massive majority, receiving just over ninety percent of the vote. While Peters' grip on Tauranga was so secure at the time that no one believed he would lose, there was some question about what his margin would have been had the other parties challenged him.

== Candidates ==
Eleven candidates stood in the election. None of the three main political parties at the time (the National Party, Labour Party or Alliance) fielded candidates. The candidates were:

- Ian Malcolm Blakie, an Auckland picture framer and art dealer, stood as an independent candidate. He advocated for tax incentives for small businesses, abolition of Maori electorates, reintroducing capital punishment for serious crimes and New Zealand becoming a republic.
- Gary John Barham, an organic farmer of Tauranga, stood under the label "Health for All" (HFA). He was a member of the Green Party and the Toxins Awareness Group which successfully campaigned the Tauranga City Council for a referendum against the use of chemical sprays by the council.
- Ashley Grant Bedford, a Tauranga-based artist, stood for the Help End Marijuana Prohibition (HEMP) movement. A longtime campaigner for legalising Marijuana, his policies were to legalise Marijuana in order to develop a hemp fibre industry in New Zealand.
- Victor Frederick Bryers, a retired engineer, was a candidate for the Christ's Ambassadors Union a party of Christian ideals. Bryers was concerned with rising public debt, high unemployment and crime increases saying that the love of money is the root of all evil. He was a candidate at the recent by-elections in Tamaki and Wellington Central.
- Raymond Alan Campbell, an unemployed man from Rotorua, stood for the Aotearoa Partnership. He stated his party believed New Zealand should be the leading country in Polynesia rather than "a colony of an Asian superpower" and advocated for zero immigration. He was also critical of the selling of revenue earning state assets, lack of political accountability and foreign property ownership.
- Lynne Lee, an Auckland transcendental meditation teacher, was the candidate of the Natural Law Party. She was critical of what she saw as "negative, confrontational and adversarial politics" and wanted to fix the cause of problems rather than the symptoms. In particular she was concerned with lowering crime and improving health and wellbeing of New Zealanders.
- Winston Peters, a lawyer and MP for Tauranga, stood as an independent candidate. Peters had resigned from the National Party a month earlier after he was deselected as the party candidate for Tauranga. He had been publicly opposed to many government decisions which he saw as a betrayal of National's policy pledges at the 1990 election. During the by-election he campaigned for a referendum on the electorate's rights "over the faceless few in Wellington." National had previously attempted to prevent Peters from seeking re-election for any party or label. Peters successfully challenged the party's actions in the High Court in the case Peters v Collinge where the court ruled this interfered with democratic process, making it illegal under common law, and thusly legally unenforceable.
- Gregory Mark Pittams, a 'Jacobite revolutionary' from Auckland, stood for the satirical McGillicuddy Serious Party. Pittams wanted to encourage new crop cultivation by outlawing kiwifruit, potatoes, carrots, brussels sprouts and turnips. At the 1990 election he had stood in the Pakuranga electorate.
- Rhona Sharon Tengblad, an 'Admiral of the Bloke Fleet' from Waiheke Island, stood for the joke party the Blokes' Liberation Front. She pledged to sell the Beehive to the United States to repay national debt, move parliament to Waiheke Island, introduce free apples and milk and appoint Linda McCartney as an advisor to Prime Minister Jim Bolger.
- Peter Keith Wakeman, a Christchurch pilot, stood as an independent candidate. He advocated for a compulsory savings scheme, ending goods and services tax refunds on prepaid travel to New Zealand, improving sex education standards and changing the electoral system to Single transferable vote. He also favoured increased spending on health and education with decreasing spending on defence.
- Peter Richard Watson, an accountant from Waipukurau, was a candidate for the 'Silent Majority'. He was concerned with public spending levels and urged for New Zealanders to become more self-sufficient and less reliant on social spending programmes from central government.

== Previous election ==
1990 general election: Tauranga
| Party | Candidate | Votes | % | ±% |
|---|---|---|---|---|
| National | Winston Peters | 13,906 | 65.64 | +12.22 |
| Labour | Bill Delaney | 4,592 | 21.67 | |
| Green | Terry Coles | 1,566 | 7.39 | |
| NewLabour | Muriel Powell | 605 | 2.85 | |
| Social Credit | Trevor Powell | 287 | 1.35 | |
| McGillicuddy Serious | Richard Barr | 141 | 0.66 | |
| Democrats | Douglas Meiklejohn | 87 | 0.41 | |
| Majority | | 9,314 | 43.96 | +32.33 |
| Turnout | | 21,184 | 88.07 | +0.14 |
| Registered electors | | 24,052 | | |

== Results ==
The following table gives the election results:

1993 Tauranga by-election
| Party | Candidate | Votes | % | ±% |
|---|---|---|---|---|
| Independent | Winston Peters | 11,458 | 90.71 | +25.07 |
| McGillicuddy Serious | Greg Pittams | 271 | 2.15 | |
| Independent | Peter Wakeman | 190 | 1.50 | |
| HFA | Gary Barham | 185 | 1.46 | |
| Silent Majority | Peter Richard Watson | 184 | 1.46 | |
| Independent | Ian Baikie | 109 | 0.86 | |
| Natural Law | Lynne Lee | 101 | 0.80 | |
| HEMP | Ashley Bedford | 55 | 0.44 | |
| Blokes' Liberation Front | Rhona Tengblad | 29 | 0.23 | |
| Aotearoa Partnership | Raymond Campbell | 25 | 0.20 | |
| Christ's Ambassadors Union | Victor Bryers | 24 | 0.19 | |
| Informal votes | | 449 | 3.43 | |
| Majority | | 11,187 | 88.57 | +44.61 |
| Turnout | | 13,080 | 49.08 | −38.99 |
| Registered electors | | 26,651 | | |

The distant runner-up in the election was a member of the McGillicuddy Serious Party, a joke party.
