= Winston Peters =

New Zealand politician (born 1945)

The Right Honourable Winston Peters MP
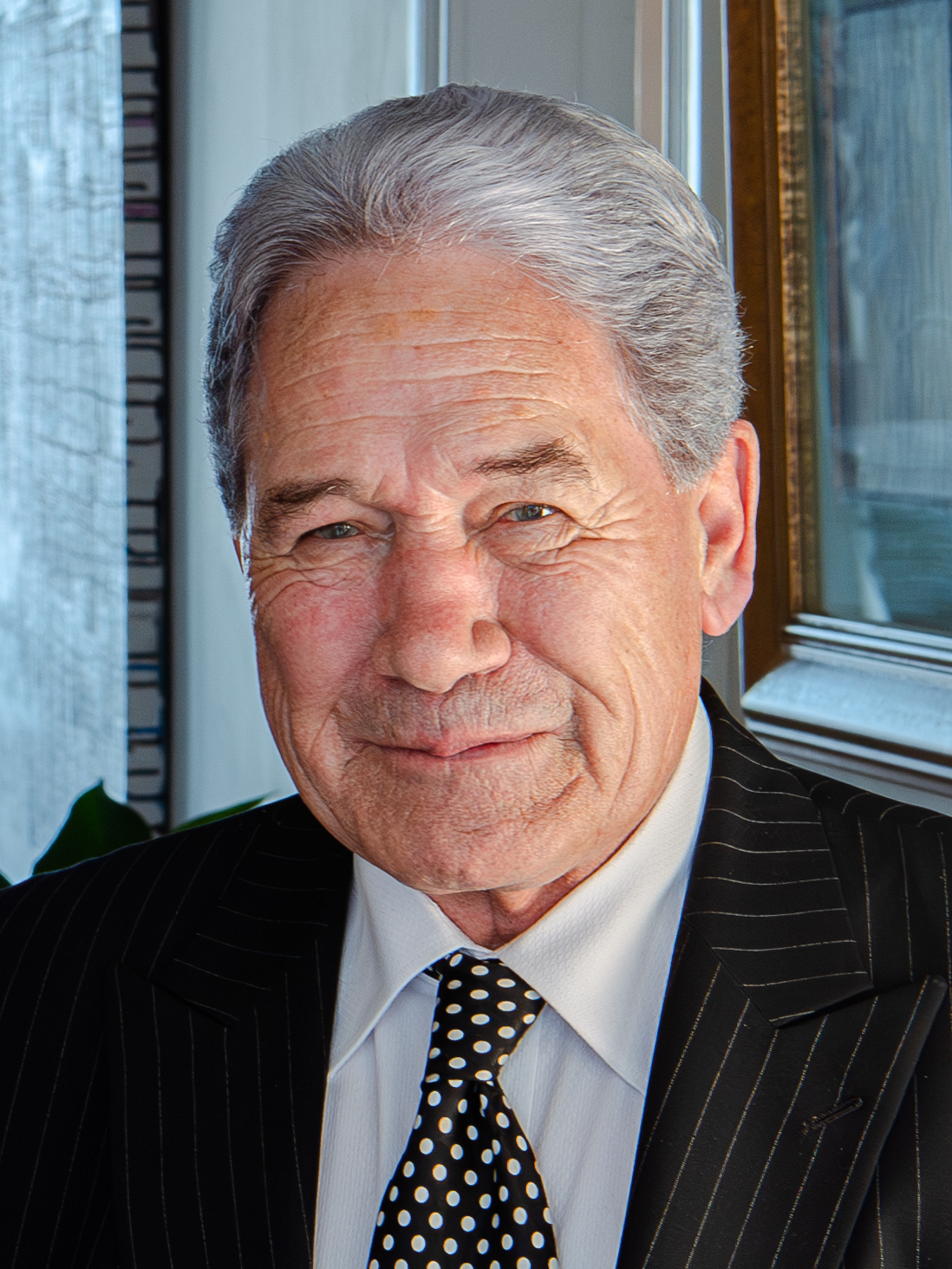
- Peters in 2024

25th Minister of Foreign Affairs
- Incumbent
- Assumed office 27 November 2023
- Prime Minister: Christopher Luxon
- Preceded by: Grant Robertson
- In office 26 October 2017 – 6 November 2020
- Prime Minister: Jacinda Ardern
- Preceded by: Gerry Brownlee
- Succeeded by: Nanaia Mahuta
- In office 19 October 2005 – 29 August 2008
- Prime Minister: Helen Clark
- Preceded by: Phil Goff
- Succeeded by: Helen Clark (acting); Murray McCully

13th Deputy Prime Minister of New Zealand
- In office 27 November 2023 – 31 May 2025
- Monarch: Charles III
- Prime Minister: Christopher Luxon
- Governor-General: Cindy Kiro
- Preceded by: Carmel Sepuloni
- Succeeded by: David Seymour
- In office 26 October 2017 – 6 November 2020
- Monarch: Elizabeth II
- Prime Minister: Jacinda Ardern
- Governor-General: Patsy Reddy
- Preceded by: Paula Bennett
- Succeeded by: Grant Robertson
- In office 16 December 1996 – 14 August 1998
- Monarch: Elizabeth II
- Prime Minister: Jim Bolger; Jenny Shipley
- Governor-General: Michael Hardie Boys
- Preceded by: Don McKinnon
- Succeeded by: Wyatt Creech

8th Minister for Racing
- Incumbent
- Assumed office 27 November 2023
- Prime Minister: Christopher Luxon
- Preceded by: Kieran McAnulty
- In office 26 October 2017 – 6 November 2020
- Prime Minister: Jacinda Ardern
- Preceded by: David Bennett
- Succeeded by: Grant Robertson
- In office 19 October 2005 – 19 November 2008
- Prime Minister: Helen Clark
- Preceded by: Damien O'Connor
- Succeeded by: John Carter

29th Minister for Rail
- Incumbent
- Assumed office 11 December 2024
- Prime Minister: Christopher Luxon
- Preceded by: Philip Burdon (1996, as Minister of Railways)

Leader of New Zealand First
- Incumbent
- Assumed office 18 July 1993
- Deputy: Tau Henare; Peter Brown; Tracey Martin; Ron Mark; Fletcher Tabuteau; Shane Jones
- Preceded by: Office established
Ministerial offices 1990–1998
1st Treasurer of New Zealand
In office 16 December 1996 – 14 August 1998
Prime Minister	Jim Bolger; Jenny Shipley
Preceded by	Office established
Succeeded by	Bill Birch
35th Minister of Māori Affairs
In office 2 November 1990 – 2 October 1991
Prime Minister	Jim Bolger
Preceded by	Koro Wētere
Succeeded by	Doug Kidd
Parliamentary offices
Member of the New Zealand Parliament
Incumbent
Assumed office 14 October 2023
Constituency	New Zealand First List
In office 23 September 2017 – 17 October 2020
Constituency	New Zealand First List
In office 28 March 2015 – 23 September 2017
Preceded by	Mike Sabin
Succeeded by	Matt King
Constituency	Northland
In office 26 November 2011 – 28 March 2015
Succeeded by	Ria Bond
Constituency	New Zealand First List
In office 17 September 2005 – 3 October 2008
Constituency	New Zealand First List
In office 17 July 1984 – 17 September 2005
Preceded by	Keith Allen
Succeeded by	Bob Clarkson
Constituency	Tauranga
In office 24 May 1979 – 28 November 1981
Preceded by	Malcolm Douglas
Succeeded by	Colin Moyle
Constituency	Hunua

Personal details
- Born: Wynston Raymond Peters; 11 April 1945 (age 81) Whangārei, New Zealand
- Party: New Zealand First (since 1993)
- Other political affiliations: National (1979–1993)
- Children: 2, including Bree
- Relatives: Jim Peters (brother); Ian Peters (brother); Ron Peters (brother); Lynette Stewart (sister)
- Education: University of Auckland (BA/LLB)
- Peters' voice Winston speaking during a meeting with US Secretary of State Antony Blinken. Recorded 11 April 2024

Winston Raymond Peters PC (born 11 April 1945) is a New Zealand politician. He has led the political party New Zealand First since he founded it in 1993, and since November 2023 has served as the 25th minister of foreign affairs. A long-serving member of Parliament (MP), Peters was re-elected for a fifteenth time at the 2023 general election, having previously been an MP from 1979 to 1981, 1984 to 2008 and 2011 to 2020. He served as the 13th deputy prime minister of New Zealand from November 2023 to May 2025. This was his third time in the role, previously serving from 1996 to 1998 and 2017 to 2020. In addition to his foreign affairs portfolio, Peters concurrently serves as the 8th minister for racing and the 29th minister for rail.

Peters first entered the New Zealand House of Representatives for the National Party in the 1978 general election, taking office in 1979 after a high court ruling initially nullified his victory. Peters rose in prominence during the 1980s as an eloquent and charismatic Māori conservative, first gaining national attention for exposing the Māori loan affair in 1986. He first served in the Cabinet as minister of Māori affairs when Jim Bolger led the National Party to victory in 1990. He was dismissed from this post in 1991 after criticising his own Government's economic and foreign ownership policies, particularly the neoliberal reforms known as Ruthanasia. Leaving the National Party in 1993, Peters briefly served as an independent and rewon his seat in a by-election. He then founded New Zealand First, a populist party with a distinctly Māori character, backed by ex-Labour and National voters alike disenchanted with neoliberalism. Peters started the Winebox Inquiry in 1994, which concerned companies using the Cook Islands as a tax haven.

As leader of New Zealand First, he held the balance of power after the 1996 election and formed a coalition with the National Party, securing the positions of deputy prime minister and treasurer, the latter position created for Peters. However, the coalition dissolved in 1998 following the replacement of Bolger by Jenny Shipley as prime minister. In 1999, New Zealand First returned to opposition before entering government with Labour Party prime minister Helen Clark, in which Peters served as minister of foreign affairs from 2005 to 2008. In the 2008 general election, after a funding scandal involving Peters and his party, New Zealand First failed to reach the 5% threshold. As a result, neither Peters nor New Zealand First were returned to Parliament.

In the 2011 general election, New Zealand First experienced a resurgence in support, winning 6.8% of the party vote to secure eight seats in Parliament. Peters returned to Parliament and spent two terms in opposition before forming a coalition government with the Labour Party in 2017. The new prime minister Jacinda Ardern appointed Peters as deputy prime minister and minister of foreign affairs. Peters was acting prime minister from 21 June 2018 to 2 August 2018 while Ardern was on maternity leave. He failed to be elected for a third time in the 2020 election, but staged another comeback in 2023 and helped form the Sixth National Government. After entering into a coalition agreement with National leader Christopher Luxon, Peters served as Luxon's deputy prime minister from 27 November 2023 to 31 May 2025, when he was succeeded by David Seymour as part of a rotation agreement.

== Early life and education ==
Peters' birth certificate records his birth in Whangārei and his registration as Wynston Raymond Peters. His father was Māori, primarily of the Ngāti Wai iwi, but also of Ngāti Hine and Ngāpuhi. His mother was of Clan MacInnes Scottish ancestry. Two of his brothers, Ian and Jim, have also served as MPs, and another brother, Ron, has also stood as a New Zealand First candidate. According to the journalist Ian Wishart, Peters is not fluent in the Māori language because as a child English was the language in his home and children were not allowed to speak Māori at his primary school.

He grew up on a farm in Whananaki, and after attending Whangarei Boys' High School and Dargaville High School, Peters studied at the Auckland Teachers' Training College. In 1966 he taught at Te Atatū Intermediate School in Auckland but the next year went to Australia where he became a blast-furnace worker with BHP in Newcastle, New South Wales and later a tunneler in the Snowy Mountains.

In 1970 Peters returned to New Zealand and studied history, politics and law at the University of Auckland. During his university years, Peters joined the New Zealand Young Nationals, the youth wing of the centre-right New Zealand National Party, and became acquainted with Bruce Cliffe and Paul East, who later served as Cabinet ministers in the Fourth National Government. Like his brothers Ron, Wayne, and Allan, Peters played rugby. He was a member of the University Rugby Club in Auckland and captain of the Auckland Māori Rugby team. In 1973, Peters graduated with a BA and LLB. He married his girlfriend Louise, and later worked as a lawyer at Russell McVeagh between 1974 and 1978.

== Early political career ==
New Zealand Parliament
Years	Term	Electorate	List	Party
1979–1981	39th	Hunua		National
1984–1987	41st	Tauranga		National
1987–1990	42nd	Tauranga		National
1990–1993	43rd	Tauranga		National
1993	43rd	Tauranga		Independent
1993	43rd	Tauranga		NZ First
1993–1996	44th	Tauranga		NZ First
1996–1999	45th	Tauranga	1	NZ First
1999–2002	46th	Tauranga	1	NZ First
2002–2005	47th	Tauranga	1	NZ First
2005–2008	48th	List	1	NZ First
2011–2014	50th	List	1	NZ First
2014–2015	51st	List	1	NZ First
2015–2017	51st	Northland		NZ First
2017–2020	52nd	List	1	NZ First
2023–2026	54th	List	1	NZ First
2026–present	55th	List	1	NZ First

Peters entered national politics in 1975 general election, standing unsuccessfully for the National Party in the electorate seat of Northern Maori. Securing 1,873 votes, Peters did not lose his deposit, which is rare for a National candidate in a Māori seat. This followed a successful campaign by Peters and other members of his Ngāti Wai iwi to retain their tribal land in the face of the Labour government's plan to establish coastal-land reserves for the public. As a result, the government of the day took virtually no ancestral land in the Whangārei coastal areas, and the initiative helped inspire the 1975 Land March led by Whina Cooper.

Peters first became a member of parliament following the 1978 general election, but only after winning in the High Court an electoral petition which overturned the election-night result for the seat of Hunua (an electorate in the southern Auckland city area) against Malcolm Douglas, the brother of Roger Douglas. Peters took his seat—six months after polling day—on 24 May 1979. He lost this seat in 1981, but in 1984 he successfully stood in the electorate of Tauranga.

After re-entering parliament Peters was appointed Shadow Minister of Māori Affairs, Consumer Affairs and Marketing by National leader Sir Robert Muldoon. When Muldoon was replaced as leader by Jim McLay, Peters retained only Māori Affairs in a reshuffle but was also allocated the transport portfolio. In March 1986 when McLay was replaced by Jim Bolger as leader, Peters was nominated for the deputy leadership, but he declined the nomination.

On 16 December 1986 Peters exposed the Māori loan affair in Parliament; this involved the-then Māori Affairs Department attempting to raise money illegally through a NZ$600 million loan-package offered by the Hawaiian businessman Michael Gisondi and the West German businessman Max Raepple. Peters became the National Party's spokesperson on Māori Affairs, Consumer Affairs, and Transport. In 1987 Jim Bolger elevated him to National's Opposition front bench as spokesperson for Māori Affairs, Employment, and Race Relations. After National won the 1990 election, Peters became minister of Māori affairs in the fourth National government, led by Jim Bolger.

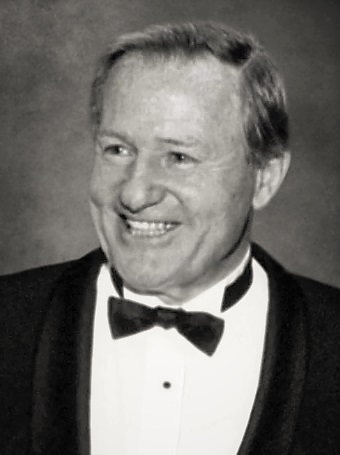
Peters became an outspoken critic of his party leader, Jim Bolger (pictured in 1992).

As minister of Māori affairs, Peters co-authored the Ka Awatea report in 1992 which advocated merging the Ministry of Māori Affairs and the Iwi Transition Agency into the present Te Puni Kōkiri (Ministry for Māori Development). Peters disagreed with the National Party leadership on a number of matters—such as the Ruthanasia economic policies—and frequently spoke out against his party regarding them. This earned him popular recognition and support. However, his party colleagues distrusted him, and his publicity-seeking behaviour made him increasingly disliked within the party. While the party leadership tolerated differences of opinion from a backbencher, they were far less willing to accept public criticism from a Cabinet minister, which (they determined) was undermining the National government. In October 1991, Bolger sacked Peters from Cabinet.

Peters remained as a National backbencher, continuing to publicly criticise the party. In late 1992, when the National Party was considering possible candidates for the elections in the following year, it moved to prevent Peters from seeking renomination (under any banner). In Peters v Collinge, Peters successfully challenged the party's actions in the High Court, and in early 1993, he chose to resign from the party and from Parliament. This prompted a by-election in Tauranga some months before the scheduled general election. Peters stood in Tauranga as an independent and won easily.

== Fourth National Government (1993–1999) ==
Shortly before the 1993 election in November, Peters established New Zealand First in July of the same year. He retained his Tauranga seat in the election. Another New Zealand First candidate, Tau Henare, unseated the Labour incumbent in Northern Maori, helping to convince people that New Zealand First was not simply Peters's personal vehicle. So began a strong association of the party with Māori voters, according to scholar Todd Donovan. Peters started the Winebox Inquiry in 1994, which concerned companies using the Cook Islands as a tax haven.

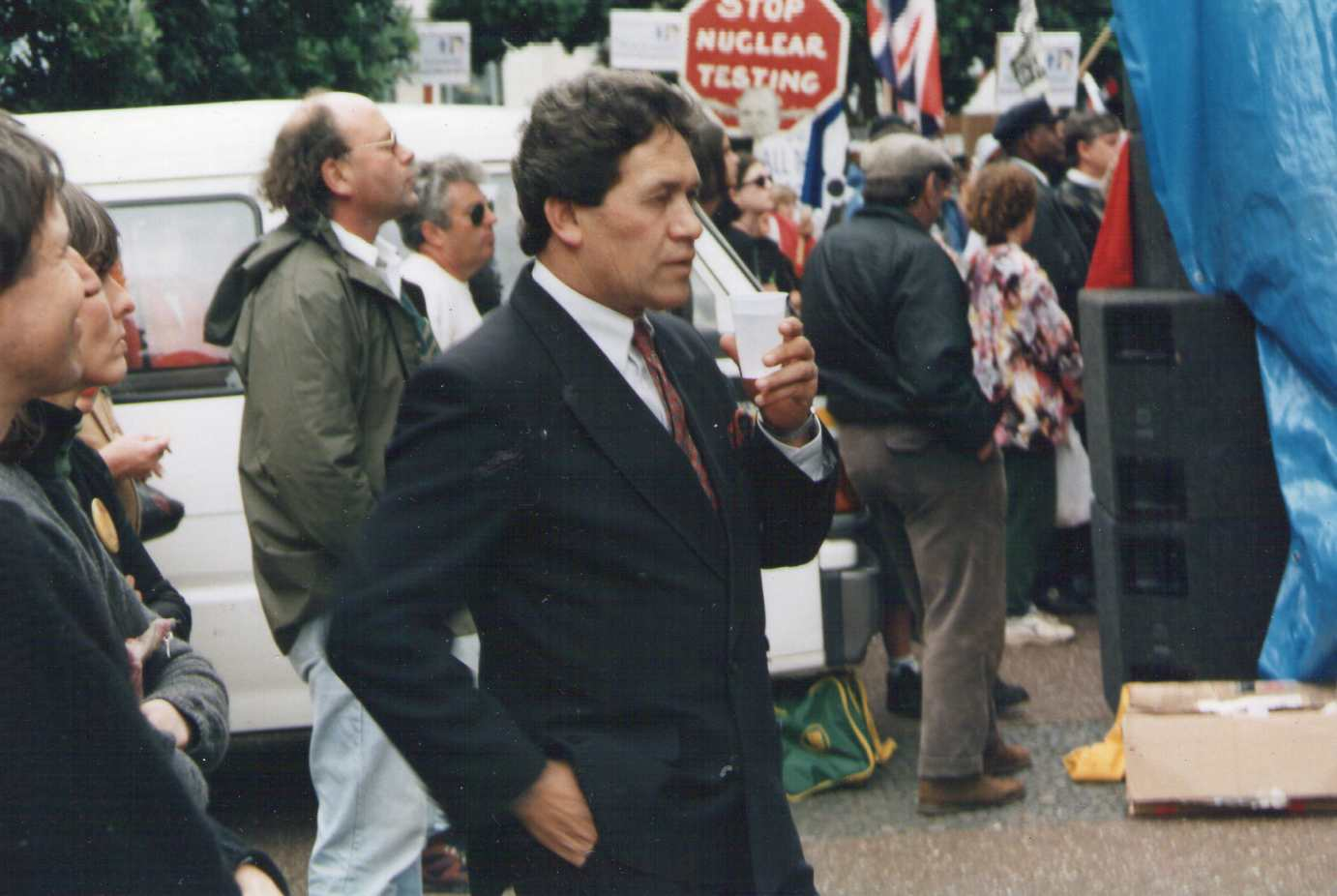
Peters on the campaign trail in Auckland, c. 1993

During the 1992 and 1993 electoral reform referendums, Peters advocated the adoption of the mixed-member proportional (MMP) electoral system. In the 1996 general election, the MMP system delivered a large increase in representation for New Zealand First. Instead of the 2 seats in the previous parliament, the party won 17 seats and swept all of the Māori electorates. More importantly, it held the balance of power in Parliament. Neither National nor Labour had enough support to govern alone. Neither party could form a majority without the backing of New Zealand First, meaning Peters could effectively choose the next prime minister. As a result, Peters became known as the "kingmaker".

It was widely expected that he would throw his support to Labour and make Labour leader Helen Clark New Zealand's second female prime minister. Peters had bitterly criticised his former National colleagues, and appeared to promise that he would not even consider a coalition with Bolger. However, after over a month of negotiations with both parties, Peters decided to enter into a coalition with National. Michael Laws, then New Zealand First's campaign manager, later claimed that Peters had already decided to enter into an agreement with National and used his negotiations with Labour simply to win more concessions from Bolger.

Whatever the case, Peters exacted a very high price for allowing Bolger to stay on as prime minister. Under the terms of a detailed coalition agreement, Peters won a number of concessions that were highly unusual for a junior coalition partner in a Westminster system, especially one as new as New Zealand First. Peters became deputy prime minister and treasurer (senior to the minister of finance), the latter post created especially for him. He also had full latitude to select the ministers from his own party, without approval from Bolger. Initially, there were concerns about whether Peters would be able to work with Bolger, who had previously sacked him from Cabinet, but the two did not seem to have any major difficulties.

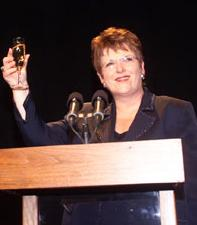
Peters had a strained relationship with Prime Minister Jenny Shipley (pictured), who sacked him from Cabinet.

Later, however, tensions began to develop between Peters and the National Party, which only worsened after Jenny Shipley staged a party room coup and became prime minister. After a dispute over the privatisation of Wellington International Airport, Shipley sacked Peters from Cabinet again on 14 August 1998. He immediately broke off the coalition and led New Zealand First back into opposition. However, several MPs, including deputy leader Henare, opted to stay in government and leave New Zealand First. It later came out that Henare had tried to oust Peters as leader, but failed. Henare and other disaffected New Zealand First MPs formed the short-lived Mauri Pacific party. None of the MPs who opted to stay in government retained their seats in the next election.

== Fifth Labour Government (1999–2008) ==
New Zealand First was severely mauled in the 1999 election, which saw Labour oust National from power. The party suffered for the rash of party-switching. Additionally, there was a wide perception that Peters had led voters to believe a vote for New Zealand First would get rid of National, only to turn around and go into coalition with National. New Zealand First dropped to 4.3% of the vote. Under New Zealand's MMP rules, a party that falls below the 5% threshold can still qualify for MMP by winning one electorate seat. However, Peters just barely held onto Tauranga after losing almost 20 percent of his vote from 1996, defeating a National challenger by 63 votes. As a result, New Zealand First remained in parliament but was reduced to five seats. Still in opposition (to the Fifth Labour Government), Peters continued to promote his traditional policies, but also became more noticeably concerned about immigration policies.

In the 2002 election, Peters performed well once again, campaigning on three main issues: reducing immigration, increasing punishments for crime, and ending the "grievance industry" around Treaty of Waitangi settlements. This message regained much support for both Peters and his party, especially from among the elderly who had in the past backed Peters, and New Zealand First won 10% of the vote and 13 seats. Peters seemed to hope that Labour would choose to ally with New Zealand First to stay in power. However, Clark explicitly rejected this possibility, instead relying on support from elsewhere.

In a speech at Orewa in 2005, he criticised immigration from Asian countries as "imported criminal activity" and warned that New Zealanders were "being colonised without having any say in the numbers of people coming in and where they are from". He also accused the Labour Party of having an "ethnic engineering and re-population policy". In July 2005, Peters said New Zealand should err on the side of caution in admitting immigrants until they "affirm their commitment to our values and standards".

=== 2005 election ===
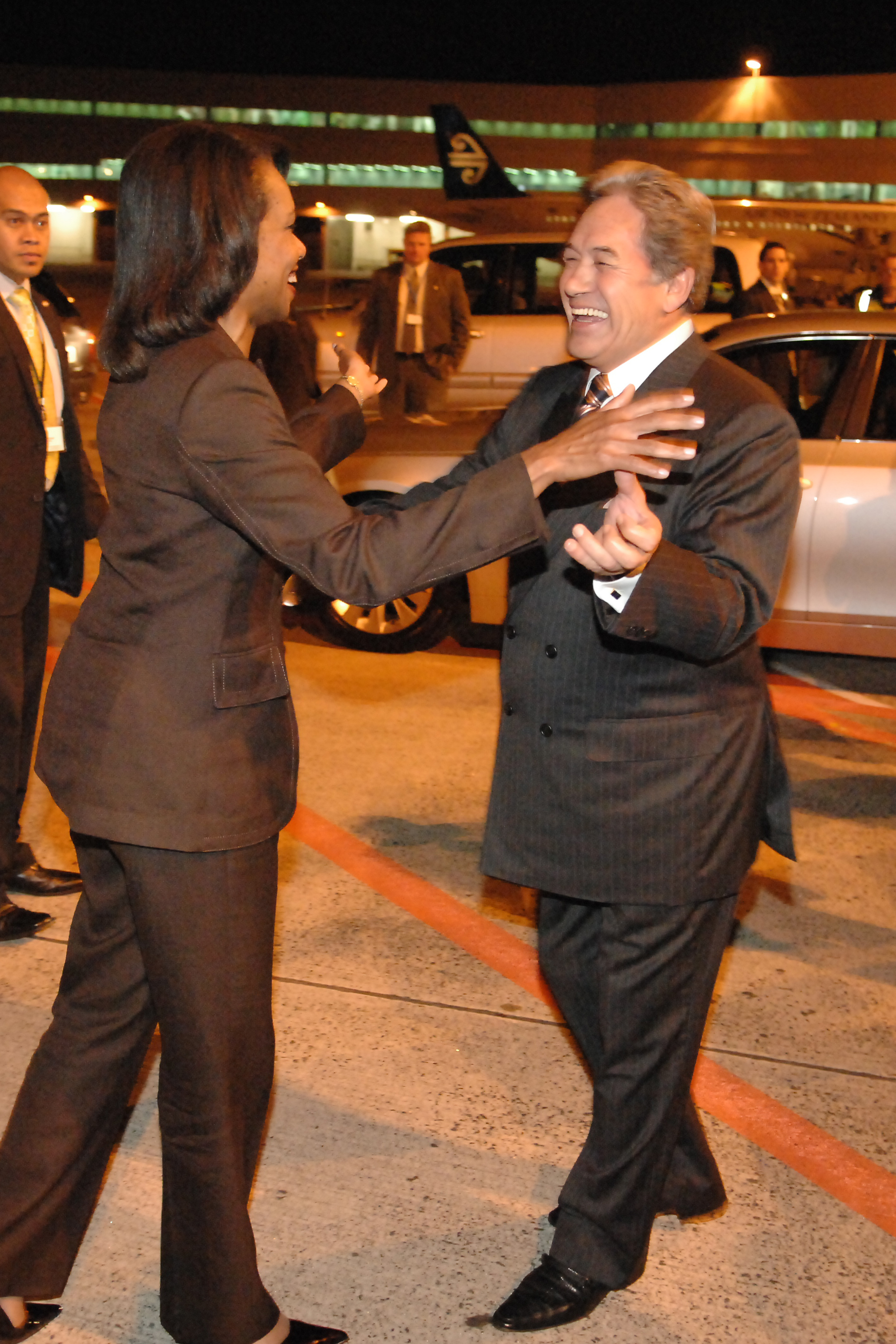
Peters greets US Secretary of State Condoleezza Rice at Auckland Airport in 2008.

As the 2005 general election approached, Peters did not indicate a preference for coalition with either of the major parties, declaring that he would not seek the "baubles of office". He promised to either give support in confidence and supply to the party with the most seats, or to abstain from no-confidence votes against it, and that he would not deal with any coalition that included the Greens. He pledged to keep post-election negotiations to under three weeks following criticism of the seven-week marathon it took to broker a deal with National in 1996.

In the election, some of New Zealand First's traditional support moved to National. Peters himself narrowly lost his longstanding hold on Tauranga to National MP Bob Clarkson, but New Zealand First did well enough to receive seven seats (down from 13 in 2002), allowing Peters to remain in Parliament as a list MP. Soon after the 2005 election Peters launched a legal challenge against Clarkson. The case alleged that Clarkson had spent more than the legal limit allowed for campaign budgets during elections in New Zealand. This legal bid ultimately failed, with a majority of the judges in the case declaring that Clarkson had not overspent.

In negotiations with Helen Clark after the election, Peters secured the ministerial portfolios of Foreign Affairs and Racing in the Labour-led government, a move which apparently lay at odds with his earlier promise to refuse the "baubles of office". He was a member of the Executive Council, although he was outside cabinet; he was able to criticise the government in areas not related to his portfolios, which experts said was an unprecedented situation. Considering his previous comments relating to immigration, there were mixed reactions from commentators. His selection for the Foreign Affairs portfolio created some measure of surprise within the country and beyond. National Party leader Don Brash said the choice was "astonishing", because "the whole region distrusts Winston Peters – Australia, Asia [...]. I think putting him as minister of foreign affairs does huge damage for our international reputation." The Age, in Australia, expressed surprise that the position had been given to an "outspoken, anti-migrant populist [and] nationalist".

Allegations concerning Peters's involvement with Simunovich Fisheries and former Member of Parliament Ross Meurant, who was engaged as both adviser to Peters and in undefined business activities with Peter Simunovich (managing director of Simunovich Fisheries), culminated in a Parliamentary Select Committee enquiry into what became known as the 'scampi enquiry'. The enquiry cleared Peters, Simunovich and Meurant of any wrongdoing.

In October 2006, Peters affirmed that he would continue to serve as leader for the 2008 election.

=== SuperGold Card ===
The SuperGold Card has been one of Peters's flagship initiatives. As a condition of the 2005 confidence-and-supply agreement between New Zealand First and the Labour Government, Peters launched the SuperGold Card in August 2007. It included public transport benefits like free off-peak travel funded by the government, and discounts from businesses and companies across thousands of outlets. Peters negotiated with then Prime Minister Helen Clark despite widespread opposition to the card on the grounds of high cost.

=== Party donations ===
Peters attracted media attention in 2008 over controversial payments for legal services and party donations. He had received $100,000 in 2006 to fund legal costs of challenging the election of Bob Clarkson to the Tauranga electorate. The money came from Owen Glenn, a wealthy New Zealand businessman and philanthropist based in Monaco. Under parliamentary rules, any gift to MPs over the value of $500 must be declared. Peters denied knowing about the source of the money but this was not corroborated by his lawyer Brian Henry and Glenn contradicted Peters's denial.

The Vela family, prominent in the racing industry, had donated $150,000 to Peters over a four-year period. The payments were made in sums of $10,000 to remain within rules governing political party funding. The Dominion Post published details from New Zealand First sources that before the 2005 election $25,000 had been donated to the party from Sir Bob Jones via the Spencer Trust. The Trust is administered by Wayne Peters, one of Winston's brothers. Jones confirmed that he had paid the money to the Spencer Trust and was asked by Winston Peters to make the donation. Peters denies that he had asked Jones for a donation to the party. The donation was not declared to the Electoral Commission as required by law.

On 29 August 2008, Peters offered to stand down from his portfolios as foreign affairs and racing minister, pending an investigation by the Serious Fraud Office as to whether the donations from Sir Bob Jones and the Vela brothers reached New Zealand First as intended. On 10 September 2008, Peters gave evidence to the Privileges Committee of the New Zealand Parliament in an attempt to refute evidence given by Owen Glenn. The Privileges Committee returned a report on 22 September recommending that Peters be censured for "knowingly providing false or misleading information on a return of pecuniary interests". Parliament passed a motion censuring Peters the following day. All but three of the parties in Parliament (New Zealand First, Labour, and Progressives who abstained) supported the censure.

Peters was later cleared by the Serious Fraud Office with respect to political donations, however some matters were referred back to the Electoral Commission as it was determined that, while no fraud had taken place, some electoral law matters with regard to funding declarations were not complied with. The police subsequently decided that no offence had been committed. Peters has referred to the affair as part of the "most vicious character assassination seen in any campaign this country has ever witnessed" and unsuccessfully sued Television New Zealand for defamation.

=== 2008 election ===
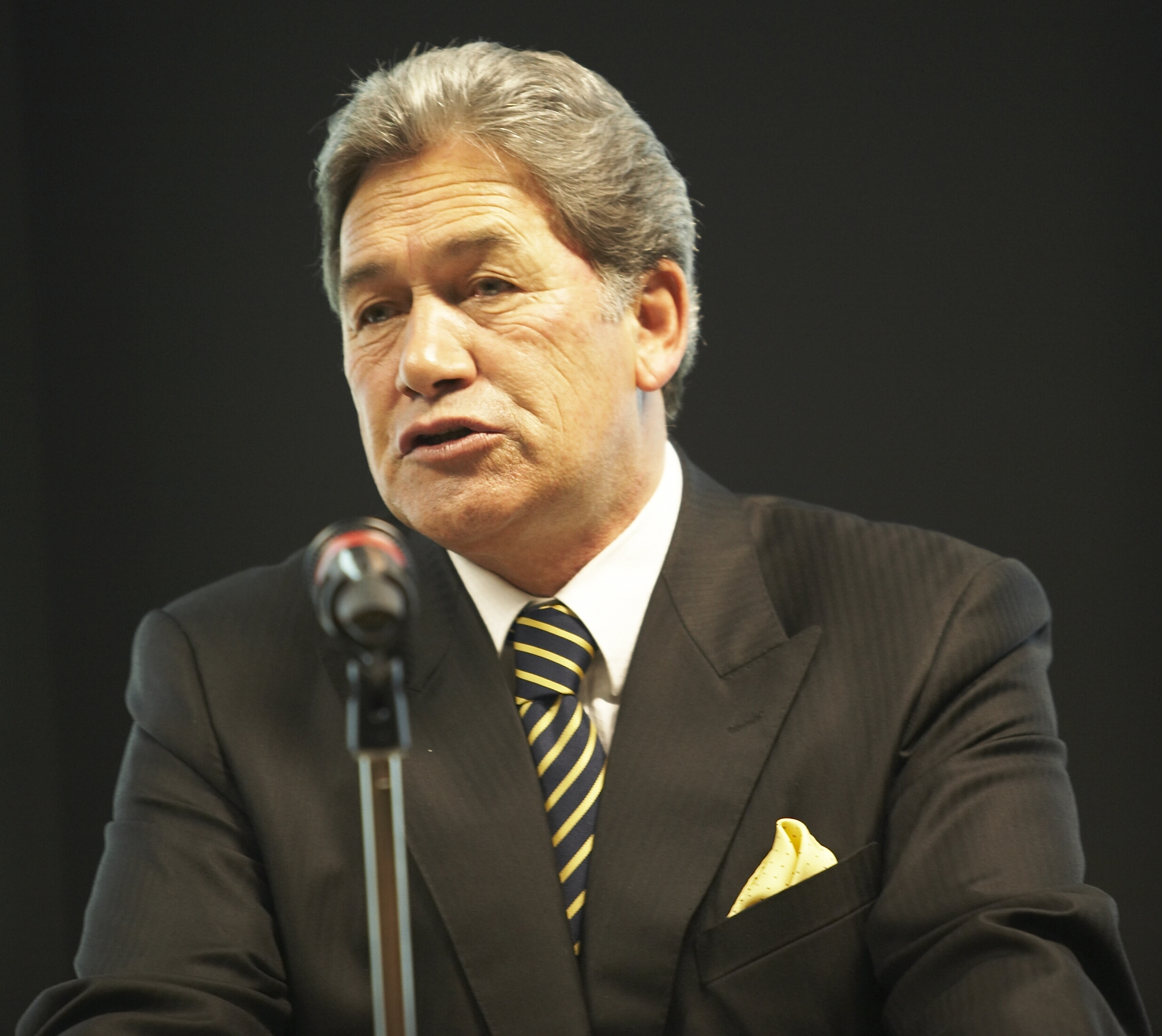
Peters at the Europa Lecture 2008, University of Auckland

Peters tried to regain Tauranga in the 2008 election and lost to National's Simon Bridges by a margin of 11,742 votes, a much larger loss than in 2005. The loss was attributed to fallout from the fundraising scandal that was seen to have damaged Peters's credibility.

With New Zealand First falling to 4.07% of the party vote—and failing to win a single electorate—Peters and his party were shut out of the 49th New Zealand Parliament. In his concession speech, Peters promised, "This is not the end", and alluded to the fact that while New Zealand First would not have any members in Parliament, its 4.07% of the vote meant it was still New Zealand's fourth largest party (after National, Labour, and the Greens). Despite this, political commentators described the defeat as "the end of the road" for Peters.

== In opposition (2008–2017) ==
Peters generally shunned the media spotlight following the 2008 election. In 2009, he caused a brief flurry of interest when it was revealed he was still using a ministerial car, some months after his election defeat. Later it was reported he had started writing a rugby column for a local magazine. He appeared on TV ONE's Q & A programme on 5 July 2009, confirming that he was still the leader of New Zealand First. He hinted at a political comeback and attacked the New Zealand government's review of the Foreshore and Seabed Act. In late 2010 and early 2011 Peters made a number of appearances on television and radio where he made it clear his and New Zealand First's intention to contest the 2011 election. New Zealand First's annual convention in July 2011 received widespread media coverage and somewhat restored the media's interest in Peters and the party.

=== 2011 election ===
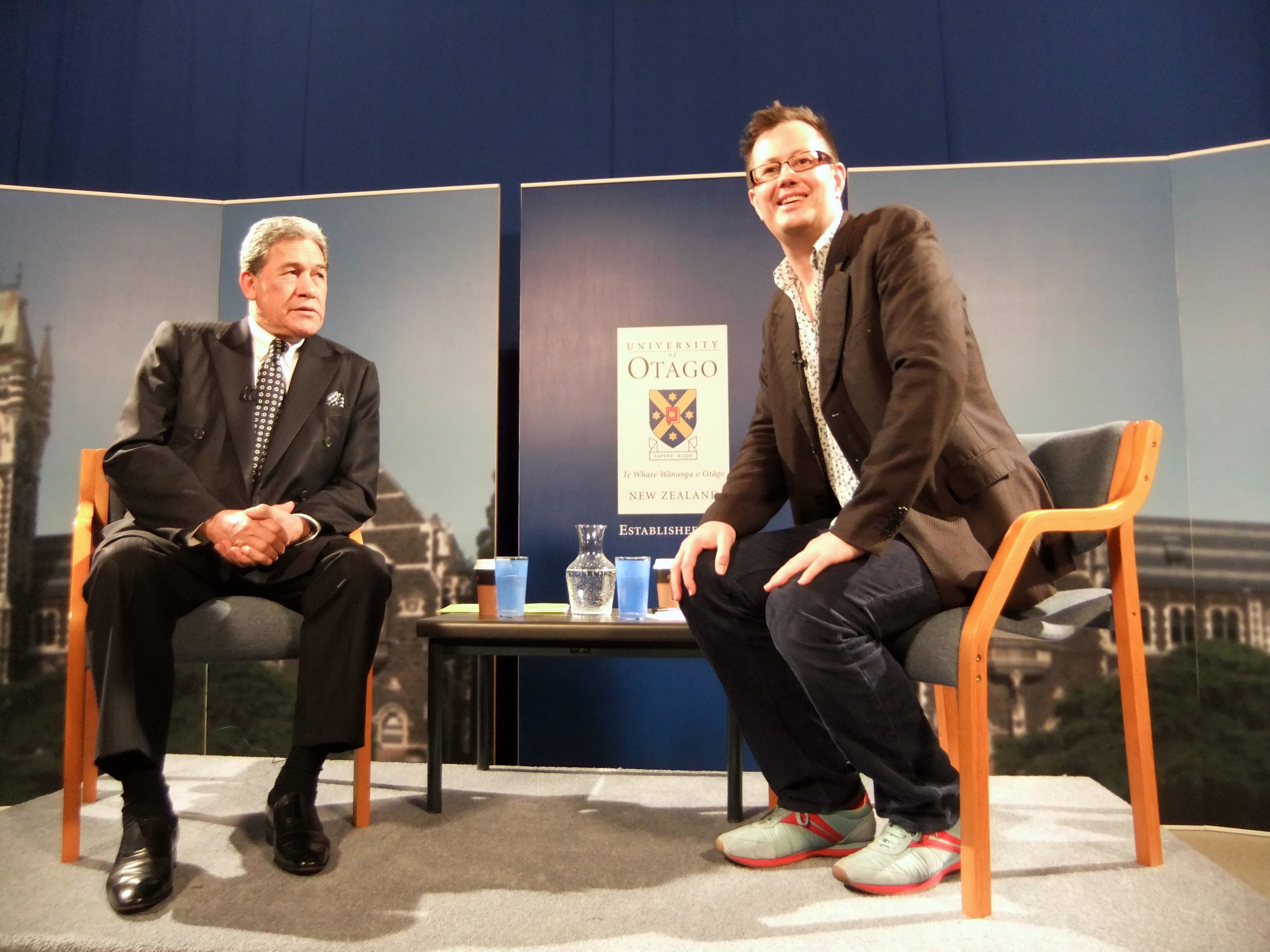
Peters talking to Bryce Edwards as a part of the Vote Chat forum at the University of Otago, 2011

In the 2011 general election New Zealand First experienced a resurgence in support, winning 6.8% of the party vote to secure eight seats in Parliament. Shortly after the election, Peters stated that his party would be in opposition and hold the "balance of responsibility". During this term, he was the New Zealand First spokesperson for finance, economic development, foreign affairs, trade, defence, immigration, senior citizens, broadcasting, racing, state owned enterprises, and Treaty of Waitangi issues, and a member of the Finance and Expenditure Committee.

=== 2014 election ===
During the 2014 general election, Peters tactically endorsed the Labour candidate Kelvin Davis in the Te Tai Tokerau Māori electorate as a means of opposing the Mana Movement MP Hone Harawira. Harawira had formed an electoral pact with the Internet Party, which was funded by controversial internet entrepreneur Kim Dotcom. Peters denounced Dotcom as a "crooked German" who "had been here for five minutes". Peters was joined by Prime Minister and National Leader John Key and the Māori Party candidate Te Hira Paenga. As a result, Harawira was defeated during the 2014 election. During the election, New Zealand First increased their parliamentary representation further, winning 8.6% of the party vote to secure 11 seats in the New Zealand Parliament. Peters continued as New Zealand First spokesperson on finance, economic development, foreign affairs, racing and senior citizens, and as a member of the Finance and Expenditure Committee.

=== 2015 Northland by-election ===
In 2015, National MP Mike Sabin resigned, leaving his seat of Northland open. The seat, located in the Far North District, and its predecessors had been in National hands for decades. However, Peters ran for the seat and won it with a commanding majority—the first time that New Zealand First had won an electorate seat since 2005. With Peters resigning his list seat to take up the Northland seat, this allowed New Zealand First's representation in parliament to increase to 12, with Ria Bond, the next available candidate on New Zealand First's party list filling the vacant list seat.

=== 2017 election ===
During the lead-up to the 2017 general election, Peters reaffirmed his support for the campaign by families of the victims of the 2010 Pike River Mine disaster to re-enter the mine to recover their loved ones. Peters publicly stated that re-entry to the mine would be non-negotiable in any coalition deal and dismissed claims that it was too dangerous to re-enter the mine.

On 13 July, Peters traded barbs with Green Party MPs Barry Coates and Metiria Turei. Coates had written on the left-wing The Daily Blog that the Greens would prefer a snap election to being left out of a Labour and New Zealand First coalition government. Meanwhile, Turei had criticised what she alleged was Peters's "racist approach towards immigration". Peters responded that Coates' comments were the "height of stupidity". He also rejected Turei's claims that New Zealand First was racist and warned that there would be consequences for the Greens in any post-election talks. Green co-leader James Shaw later clarified that Coates' remarks did not represent Green Party policy.

At New Zealand First's convention in South Auckland on 16 July 2017, Peters announced that if elected his party would hold a double referendum on eliminating the Māori seats and reducing the number of MPs in Parliament from 120 to 100 in mid-term 2017–2020. Peters also outlined his party's policies which included reducing immigration to 10,000 a year and nationalising the country's banks. Peters also proposed making KiwiBank the New Zealand government's official trading bank. In terms of law and order, Peters said that his party would build no more prisons but would make prisoners do hard labour six days a week.

During the 2017 election held on 23 September, Peters lost his Northland electorate seat to the National candidate Matt King by a margin of 1,389 votes. Despite losing his seat, New Zealand First secured 7.2% of the party vote with the party's parliamentary presence being reduced from twelve to nine seats. Since Peters ranked first on the New Zealand First list, he remained in Parliament as a list MP.

Following the 2017 election, Peters entered into coalition–forming talks with senior figures from the National and Labour parties. Neither major party had enough support to govern alone. National Party leader and Prime Minister Bill English signalled an interest in forming a coalition with New Zealand First; a potential National–New Zealand First coalition would have had 65 seats between them, enough to govern without the need for support from other parties. Labour leader Jacinda Ardern announced that her party was considering a three-way coalition with New Zealand First and the Greens. Peters indicated that he would not make his final decision until the special votes results were released on 7 October 2017.

During negotiations with Ardern, Peters abandoned his party's policy to hold a referendum on Māori seats. He clarified that the defeat of the Māori Party during the 2017 election had eliminated the rationale for his call to abolish the Māori electorates. Peters stated that foreign ownership of homes would be one of the topics discussed during negotiations with both National and Labour. He also called for Labour to scrap its contentious water tax policy on farmers. Peters also refused to negotiate with the Greens directly on the grounds that they had campaigned on a partnership with Labour. He described the Greens as a minor party with a minimal role in any potential government.

== Sixth Labour Government (2017–2020) ==
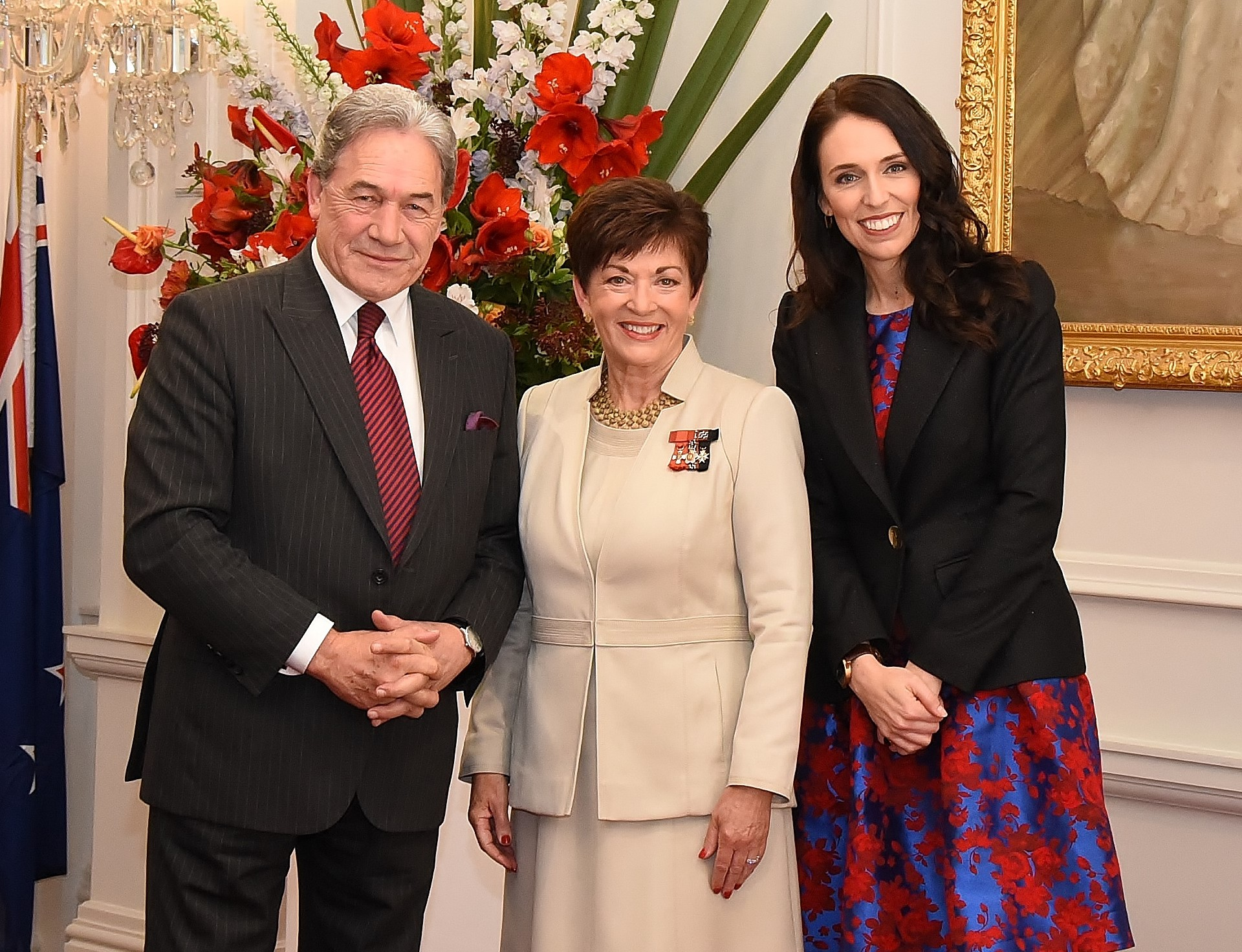
Peters with Prime Minister Jacinda Ardern and Governor-General Dame Patsy Reddy at the swearing-in of the new Cabinet on 26 October 2017

On 19 October 2017, Peters announced that New Zealand First would form a coalition with the Labour Party under Jacinda Ardern, citing changing international and internal economic circumstances as the reasoning behind his decision, coupled with a belief that a Labour government was best-placed to handle the social and economic welfare of New Zealanders in a global environment that was undergoing rapid and seismic change.

As part of the agreement, New Zealand First had four portfolios inside Cabinet and one outside. On 26 October 2017, Peters assumed the positions of deputy prime minister, minister of foreign affairs, minister for state owned enterprises and minister for racing. On 19 January 2018, Prime Minister Jacinda Ardern announced that she was pregnant and that Peters would take the role of acting prime minister for six weeks after the delivery, which happened on 21 June 2018. Peters managed the "day to day" business of the country while Ardern was on maternity leave—a first in modern politics. Ardern returned to the role of Prime Minister full-time on 2 August 2018.

In August 2019, Peters called for a binding referendum on the Government's proposed Abortion Legislation Bill, claiming that it had not been part of New Zealand First's coalition agreement with Labour. Peters's remarks surprised both Justice Minister Andrew Little of the Labour Party and New Zealand First MP and cabinet minister Tracey Martin, who had participated in months of negotiations on the bill. Peters also declared that New Zealand First MPs would not be allowed a conscience vote on the issue and would vote as a caucus to support the bill at first reading. He warned that New Zealand First would withdraw support if the proposed law was not put to a public referendum. Little rejected Peters's demands for a referendum on the grounds that the legislation was a parliamentary matter.

In October 2019 Peters announced $7.7 million investment into the SuperGold Card scheme. The "upgrade" includes a new website, a mobile app, and 500 new partner businesses.

According to The New Zealand Herald in July 2020, Peters's New Zealand First fully or partially achieved 80% of the 70 promises made by Ardern to secure its support for her premiership.

=== Foreign affairs ===
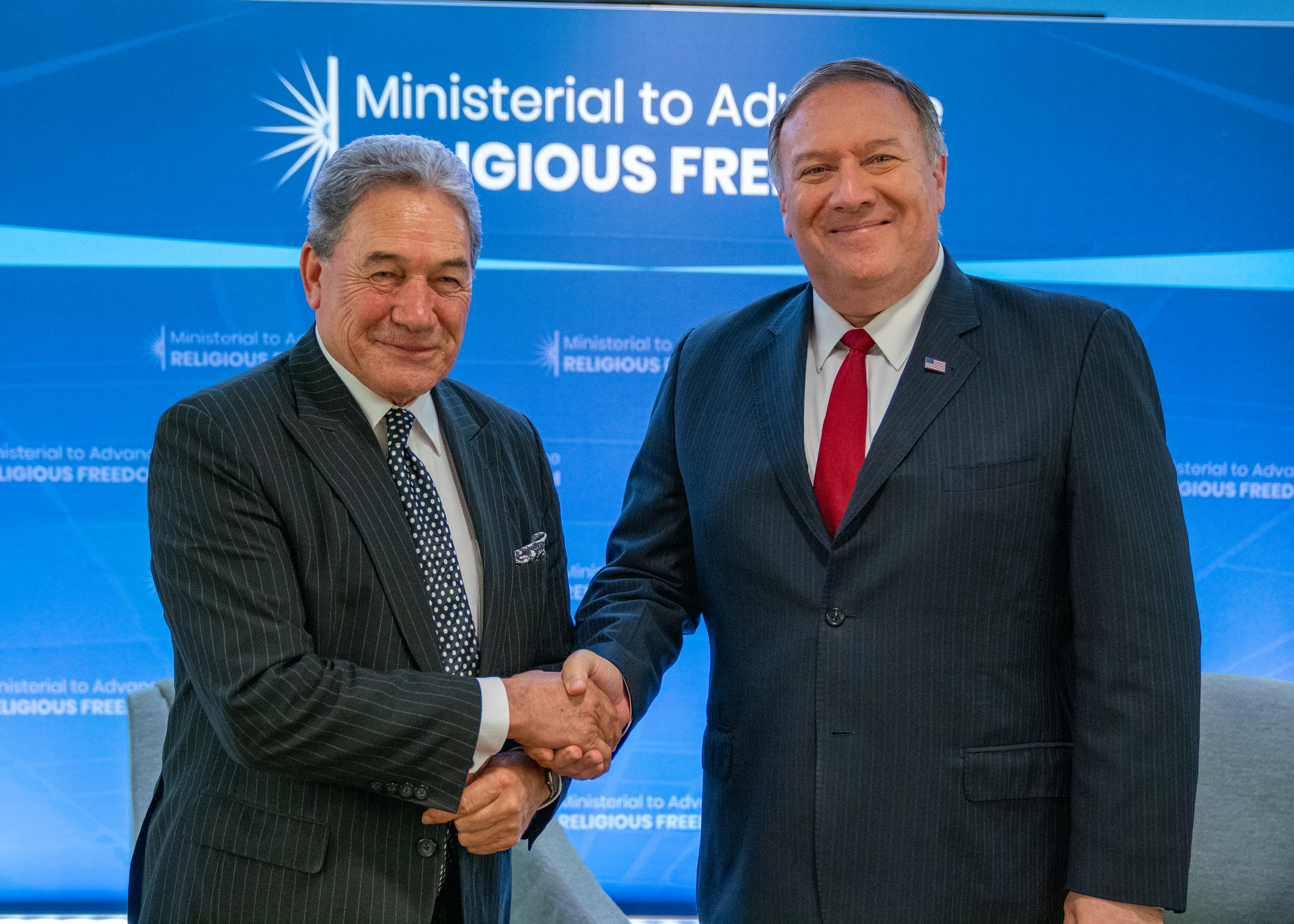
Peters meets US Secretary of State Mike Pompeo, 17 July 2018

As minister of foreign affairs, his commitments include the initiation of a closer economic relations agreement with the UK, Australia, Canada, and other Commonwealth countries and to work towards a bilateral free-trade agreement with the Russia-Belarus-Kazakhstan Customs Union. In July 2019, during a visit to Washington, DC, Peters proposed a bilateral free-trade agreement between New Zealand and the United States.

On 5 May 2020, Peters expressed support for Taiwan rejoining the World Health Organization during a press conference. Peters's announcement was welcomed by the Taiwanese Government, which reiterated its friendship with New Zealand. The New Zealand Government subsequently announced its support for Taiwan's bid to join the WHO, putting New Zealand alongside Australia and the United States who have taken similar positions. In response, the Chinese Embassy issued a statement reminding Wellington to adhere to the One China Policy. In response, Peters told the Chinese Ambassador to "listen to her master", and stated that New Zealand should follow Taiwan's example of making the wearing of face masks compulsory. Peters's remarks were criticised by Chinese Foreign Ministry spokesperson Zhao Lijian, who warned that they violated the One China Policy and would hurt China–New Zealand relations. Peters has stood by his remarks.

On 28 July 2020, Peters announced that New Zealand was suspending its extradition treaty with Hong Kong in response to the Hong Kong national security law, which he claimed "eroded rule of law principles" and undermined the "one country, two systems" rule. In response, the Chinese Embassy criticised the New Zealand Government for violating international law and norms, and interfering in China's internal affairs.

On 22 July 2020, Peters attracted media scrutiny for allegedly using his position as minister of foreign affairs to get Antarctica New Zealand to arrange a taxpayer–funded trip to Antarctica for two wealthy friends. Peters defended his actions and claimed that he was trying to raise NZ$50 million in private sponsorship to offset some of the costs of the NZ$250 million redevelopment of New Zealand's Antarctic base Scott Base.

In response to evidence that Russian opposition leader Alexei Navalny was poisoned in September 2020, Peters called it "deeply troubling".

=== Superannuation payments ===
In late August 2017, Peters admitted being overpaid in superannuation for seven years while living with his longtime partner Jan Trotman. The overpayment occurred because the relationship status box on his application form was left blank. Peters stated that he and the Ministry agreed that there had been a payment error but said he had paid the money back – amounting to nearly $18,000. Peters paid interest and penalties on the overpayment.

The overpayment was subsequently leaked to the media. Peters described it as a private matter and expressed outrage that it had been leaked. In 2019, while serving as deputy prime minister, he took former National ministers Paula Bennett and Anne Tolley, the Ministry of Social Development, its former chief executive Brendon Boyle, and State Services Commissioner Peter Hughes to court seeking $450,000 from each defendant for breaching his privacy.

On 20 April 2020, Justice Geoffrey Venning of the Auckland High Court dismissed Peters's case against Bennett, Tolley, the Ministry of Social Development, Boyle, and Hughes on the basis that Peters had not been able to establish that they were responsible for the disclosure of the payment irregularity to the media. However, the High Court also ruled that Peters's privacy had been deliberately breached during the lead-up to the 2017 general election to publicly embarrass him and cause him harm.

On 20 July 2020, Peters was ordered by the Auckland High Court Justice Venning to pay a total $320,000 to the defendants Bennett and Tolley, State Services Commissioner Peter Hughes, the Ministry of Social Development and its former chief executive Brendan Boyle. In response, Peters announced that he would appeal the High Court's judgment. In August 2021, the Court of Appeal dismissed Peters' appeal and ordered him to pay the legal costs of the Attorney-General, Boyle and Hughes – in addition to the $320,000 bill from the High Court.

=== 2020 general election ===
In the 2020 New Zealand general election held on 17 October, Peters and his fellow New Zealand First MPs lost their seats after the party's share of the popular vote dropped to 2.6%, below the five percent threshold needed to enter Parliament. Peters continued to serve in a caretaker role until 6 November 2020 (the date the members of the next Parliament took their seats), after which he was replaced by Grant Robertson as deputy prime minister, and Nanaia Mahuta as minister of foreign affairs.

== Out of parliament (2020–2023) ==
On 20 June 2021, Peters announced during New Zealand First's annual general meeting in East Auckland that he would continue leading the party for the 2023 general election. Peters also made a speech attacking the Labour, National and Green parties, the increasing use of the Māori language in official reports and public life, the Auckland cycle bridge, Auckland light rail, the Government's COVID-19 vaccination rollout, purchase of Ihumātao land, Bright Line Test, elimination of referendums on Māori wards, and so-called wokeness in New Zealand society. This speech marked his first major public appearance since the 2020 general election.

On 9 October 2021, Peters attracted media attention after he alleged that a female sex worker connected to the criminal organisation Mongrel Mob had caused the Northland Region's COVID-19 scare by travelling to Whangārei on false pretenses. Peters's allegation that the woman was linked to the Mongrel Mob was disputed by Mongrel Mob leader Harry Tam on Māori Television's Te Ao Māori News, who also threatened legal action. On 11 October, Peters criticised the Government's failure to prevent a COVID-19 breach in the Northland region involving the sex worker, which had led to an Alert Level 3 lockdown in the region. On 19 October, Peters apologised to Tam for alleging that he helped a COVID-19 positive case breach the Auckland border.

In February 2022, Peters expressed support for the Convoy 2022 New Zealand protest outside Parliament, which called for an end to vaccine mandates. On 22 February, Peters visited the Parliament protest camp with former New Zealand First Member of Parliament Darroch Ball. He claimed that the mainstream media had been gaslighting protesters and urged Ardern and her Cabinet to speak with protesters.

On 3 May 2022, Peters was trespassed from Parliament for two years by the Speaker of the House Trevor Mallard for visiting anti-vaccine mandate protesters. In response, Peters announced that he would seek a judicial review of the trespass notice. In addition, several other people including former National MP Matt King were issued with similar trespass notices. On 4 May, Mallard withdrew five of the trespass notices, including Peters' trespass notice, in response to Peters' threat to seek a judicial review.

=== 2023 general election ===
In late March 2023, Peters announced that if New Zealand First was elected into government, the party would remove Māori names from government departments and bring back English names. During the party's campaign launch on 23 July, Peters announced that New Zealand First would campaign on five key issues: combating so-called "racist separatism," fighting Australian-owned banks and the supermarket duopoly, investing in health, social services, and elderly care, and adopting "tough on crime" policies including building a "gang prison" and designating all gangs as terrorist organisations.

On 30 July, Peters campaigned on relocating the Ports of Auckland and the Royal New Zealand Navy's Devonport base to Northport, extending the North Island Main Trunk Line to Marsden Point, building a new four-lane alternative highway through the Brynderwyn Range, and establishing a full inquiry into the Government's handling of the COVID-19 pandemic in New Zealand. On 16 August, Peters announced New Zealand First's policy on restricting transgender people's access to bathrooms and their participation in female sporting events. The National Party criticised the policy. On 20 August, Peters announced that New Zealand First would designate English an official language of New Zealand and withdraw New Zealand from the United Nations Declaration on the Rights of Indigenous People.

On 3 September, New Zealand First released a cowboy-themed campaign video featuring Peters riding a horse. On 10 September, Peters made remarks during a public meeting in Nelson that Māori people were not indigenous to New Zealand on the grounds that they originated in the Cook Islands and China. National Party leader Christopher Luxon criticised Peters's remarks but avoided confirming nor denying whether his party would enter into coalition with New Zealand First in a future government. The National leader later confirmed that he would work with Peters in a government "to keep Labour and the Coalition of chaos out".

On 16 September, Peters was ranked first on New Zealand First's party list as a list candidate. While campaigning in Levin on 18 September, Peters reiterated New Zealand First's opposition to government funding for news media, COVID-19 vaccine mandates, gangs, co-governance and changing New Zealand's name to Aotearoa.

On 14 October, New Zealand First won 6.46% of the vote with 96.5% of ballots cast in the preliminary results during the 2023 general election. This marked a return for Peters and his party to Parliament. The final results confirmed that NZ First won 6.08% of the popular vote and eight seats. Peters was re-elected to Parliament on the party list.

== Sixth National Government (2023–present) ==
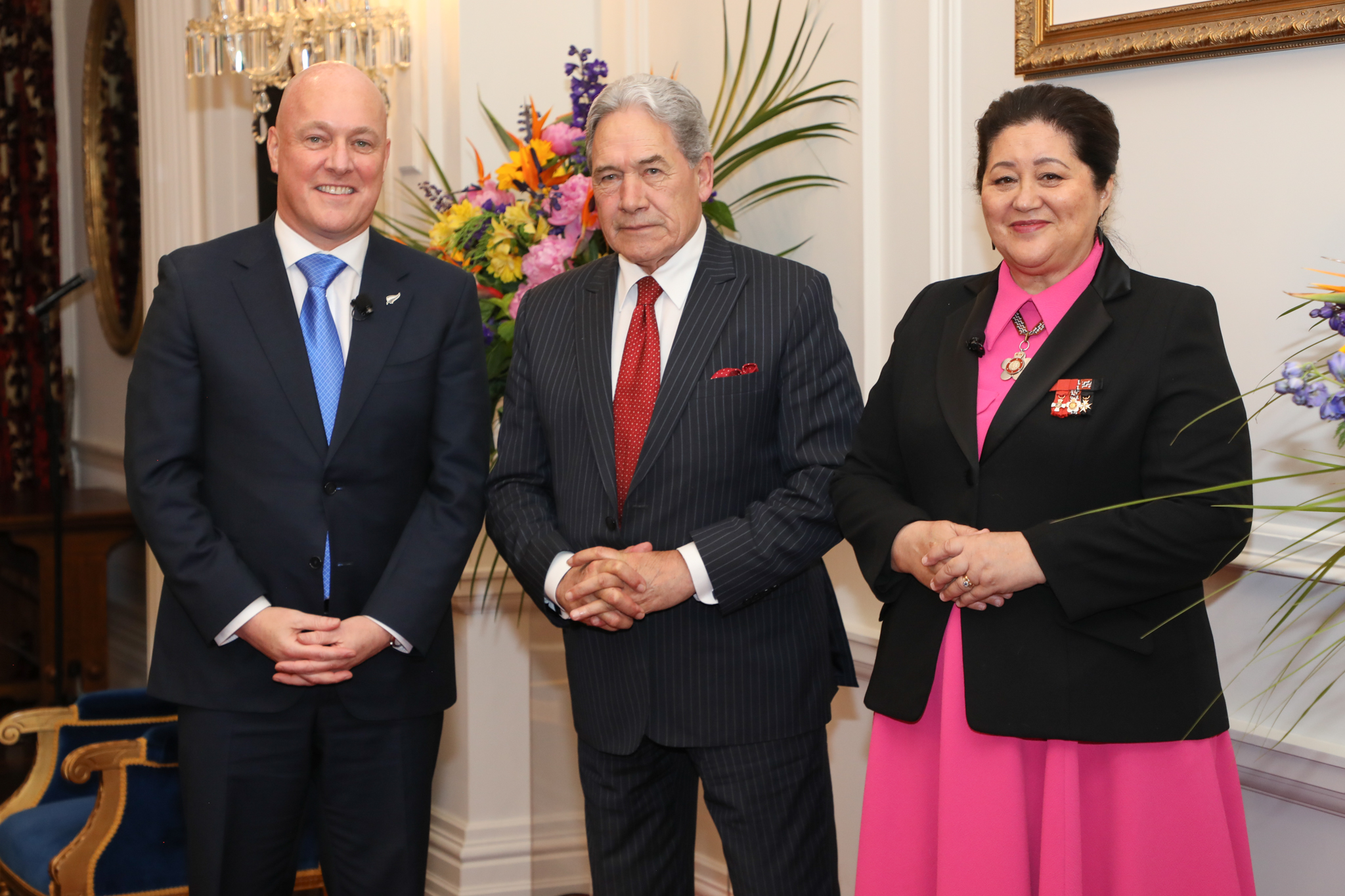
Peters with Prime Minister Christopher Luxon and Governor-General Dame Cindy Kiro at the swearing-in of the new Cabinet on 27 November 2023

=== Coalition negotiations ===
Following the 2023 election, National entered into talks with both NZ First and ACT. University of Otago law professor Andrew Geddis speculated that National's coalition talks would be influenced by Peters' demands and history of playing a "kingmaker" role in previous elections. Peters had early publicly criticised several National and ACT policies during the 2023 election campaign including National's proposal to ease the ban on foreign home purchases, tax cuts, agricultural emissions pricing, proposal to raise the retirement age from 65 to 67, and ACT's proposal to slash government expenditure and public service jobs.

Following the release of the final election results on 3 November, National and ACT fell short of the 62-seat parliamentary majority needed to form the next government. As a result, the National-led government needed NZ First as its coalition partner. In early November, Peters along with several senior NZ First officials including Darroch Ball and Shane Jones took part in negotiations with National and ACT. Following the release of final results, David Seymour attempted to contact Peters via text message but Peters alleged that he had mistaken it for a scam. Due to the prolonged negotiation process, Peters criticised a law change by the previous Labour Government allowing voters to register on election day for delaying the Electoral Commission's publication of final results by one week. Peters had earlier supported the law change in 2020.

On 23 November, coalition negotiations between the three parties concluded, with Peters meeting with Christopher Luxon and David Seymour in Wellington to finalise the coalition agreement. After Luxon informed Governor-General Dame Cindy Kiro that he had the numbers to form the incoming government, the three leaders signed the coalition agreement on 24 November, which was subsequently released to the public. Under the terms of the agreement, Peters and Seymour would share the position of deputy prime minister, with Peters holding the office for the first half of the 54th parliamentary term and Seymour holding the office during the second half. Peters also assumed the office of minister of foreign affairs in the new government. Peters took on the role of acting prime minister for a single day on 12 December 2023, while Christopher Luxon was in Australia for his daughter's graduation, and again on 20 and 21 December 2023 during Luxon's diplomatic visit to Australia.

=== Foreign affairs ===
On 15 December 2023, Peters visited Fijian prime minister Sitiveni Rabuka in his first overseas engagement as foreign minister in the National-led coalition government. He reaffirmed bilateral relations between New Zealand and Fiji.

On 12 January 2024, Peters expressed New Zealand's support for Anglo-American airstrikes against Iranian-backed Houthi forces in Yemen, which had been disrupting international shipping in response to the Gaza war. He said that the strikes supported international security and trade, adding that "we are a trading nation that relies on international maritime law and the free flow of goods, and Houthi actions strike at the heart of New Zealand's national security."

On 22 February 2024, Peters announced that New Zealand would contribute a NZ$25.9 million aid package to Ukraine including NZ$6.5 million to procure weapons and ammunition for Ukraine, NZ$7 million in humanitarian assistance, and $3 million to supporting the World Bank's Ukrainian reconstruction fund. This aid package brings NZ's total aid contribution to Ukraine since the war began to over NZ$100 million.

Between 10 and 16 March 2024, Peters undertook a tour of India, Indonesia and Singapore where he met with his foreign counterparts Subrahmanyam Jaishankar, Retno Marsudi and Vivian Balakrishnan, Chief Minister of Gujarat Bhupendrabhai Patel, Singaporean Defence Minister Ng Eng Hen and Clermont Group chair Richard Chandler. Peters stated that the coalition government regarded South and Southeast Asia as a priority in "maintaining and building New Zealand's security and prosperity." On 14 March, Peters attracted media attention after making remarks, such as "Where's the evidence?", during an interview with the Indian media outlet The Indian Express that appeared to cast doubt on Five Eyes intelligence material from Canada asserting that the Indian Government was responsible for assassinating Canadian Sikh independence activist Hardeep Singh Nijjar. In response, a Foreign Affairs spokesperson issued a statement asserting New Zealand's position that if the allegations were proven correct, "then that would be of serious concern." The Foreign spokesperson added that Peters' point was that the matter "is an ongoing investigation ... that needs to run its course before clear conclusions can be drawn." During a meeting with Canadian High Commissioner to Indian Cameron MacKay in New Delhi, Peters clarified that New Zealand's position on Hardeep Singh remained unchanged and that he was not questioning Canada's claim.

On 18 March, Peters hosted Chinese foreign minister Wang Yi during his state visit to Wellington. The two leaders discussed a range of issues important to China-New Zealand relations including trade, business, people-to-people relations links, and cooperation in the Indo-Pacific. Peters also voiced New Zealand's concerns about human rights in Hong Kong, Xinjiang and Tibet, and tensions in the South China Sea and Taiwan Strait.

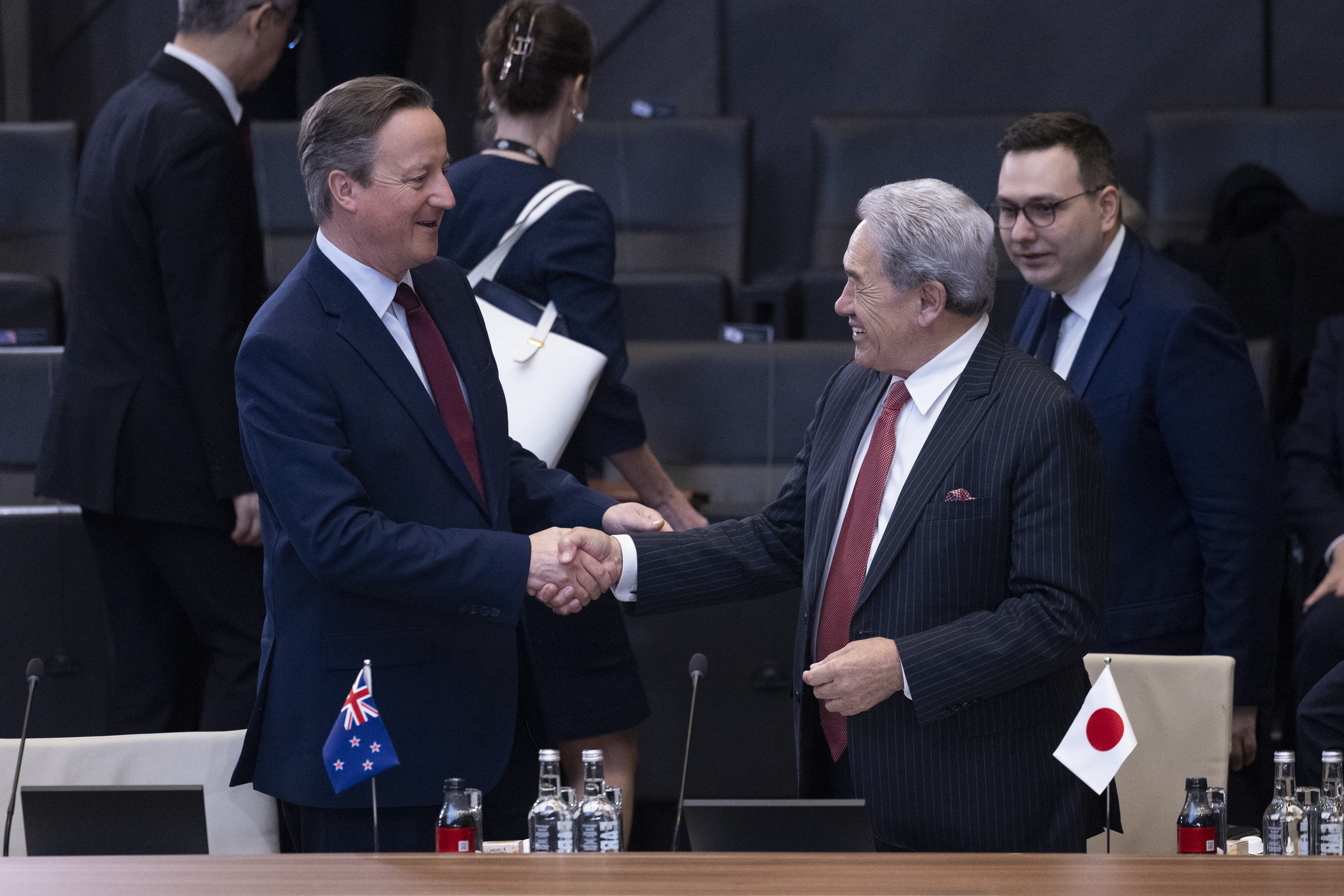
Peters with Foreign Secretary David Cameron on 4 April 2024.

Beginning on 1 April, Peters commenced a semi-global tour across parts of Africa, Europe, and America, beginning in Cairo, Egypt, meeting with Egyptian foreign minister Sameh Shoukry and Arab League Secretary General Ahmed Aboul-Gait. During this visit, Peters announced plans for humanitarian aide for Gaza due to the ongoing Gaza humanitarian crisis (2023–present). Peters later reaffirmed his support for Gaza at the United Nations, calling the situation an "utter catastrophe". From 2 to 6 April, Peters visited Poland, speaking with Radosław Sikorski in Warsaw. Then attended the NATO Foreign Ministers summit in Brussels, as a non-member attendee. Peters then concluded his tour in Europe by visiting Stockholm and meeting with Tobias Billström.

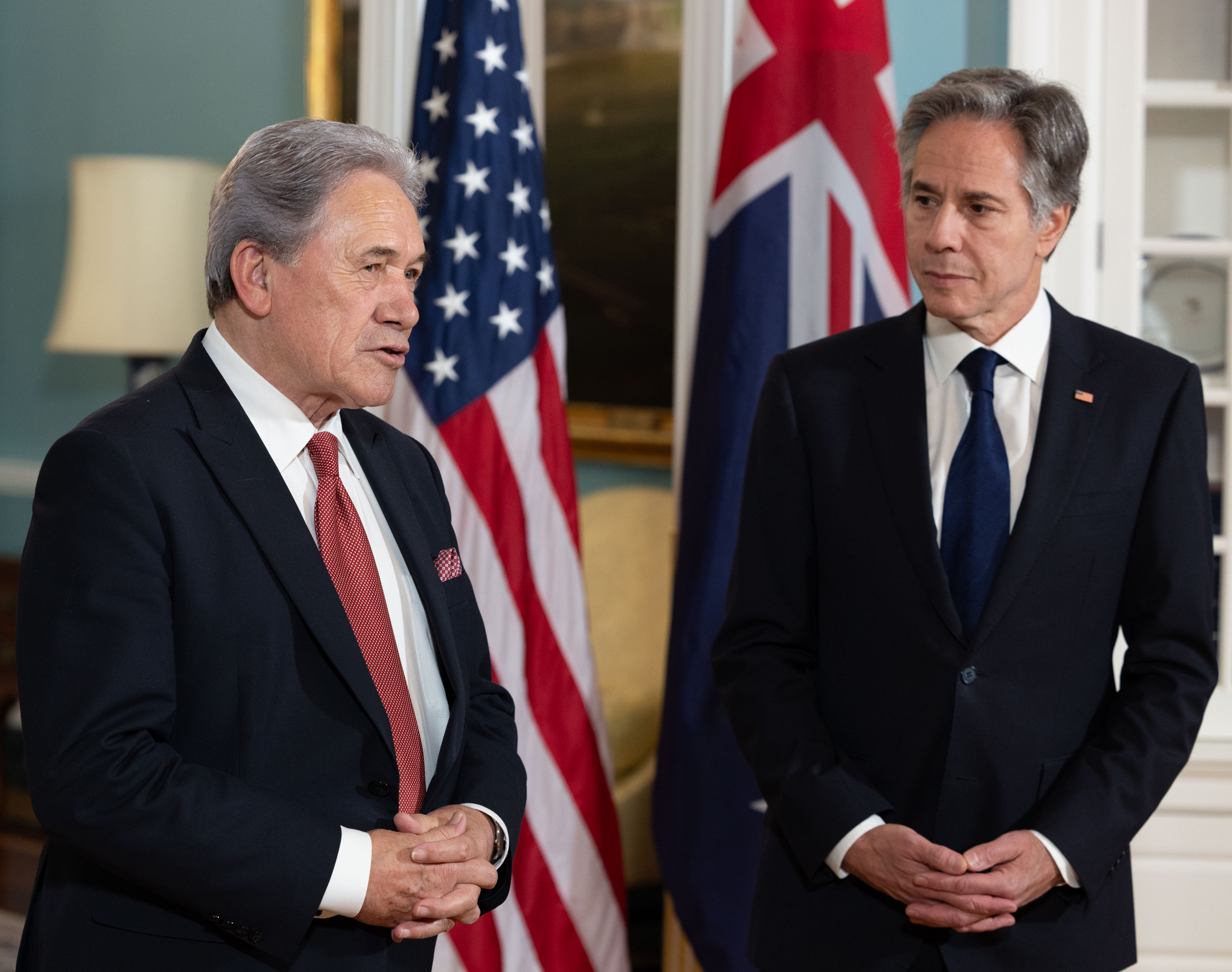
Peters meets with US Secretary of State Antony Blinken, 11 April 2024

From 6 to 12 April, Peters began his visit to the United States of America, beginning in New York, speaking at the United Nations. Peters then travelled to Washington D.C., where he met with numerous prominent American political figures including Senator Lindsey Graham. Peters then concluded his tour after meeting with U.S. Secretary of State Antony Blinken, where Peters indicated a shift in longstanding New Zealand Foreign Policy, with a desire for a closer partner between New Zealand and the United States expressed. This sparked some controversy among New Zealanders, including former prime minister Helen Clark, whom Peters previously served as foreign minister Under, who stated that closer ties to the United States would compromise New Zealand's independent foreign policy approach, as well as the governments approach to being a part of AUKUS, calling it "Profoundly undemocratic". Peters responded, saying Clark "would regret the comments she's making" and that the "decision to at least explore association with AUKUS Pillar 2 was no different to the policy of the previous Labour Government".

Peters announced on 22 April that New Zealand would spend NZ$7 million on a humanitarian aid package for Ethiopia and Somalia to help tackle regional food insecurity. Additionally on 22 April, Peters stated that New Zealand will recognise the State of Palestine at some point in the future, saying that it was a matter of "when not if". However, Peters did state that recognition would have to come at a later date, and would not encompass recognition of Hamas as its own entity. This indicated a shift in Israel–New Zealand relations, with New Zealand being open to fully adopting the proposed Two-State Solution by the United Nations.

Peters has criticised Bob Carr, formerly the premier of New South Wales and the Australian minister for foreign affairs, for his criticism of AUKUS, including a seminar he gave in Wellington against it with Helen Clark in April 2024. After Peters appeared on RNZ on 2 May and made explicit comments about Carr, Carr announced he would sue Peters for defamation.

In early May 2024, Peters confirmed that he would lead a delegation of New Zealand MPs including Health Minister and Pacific Peoples Minister Shane Reti, Climate Change Minister Simon Watts, the NZ Parliament's Foreign Affairs, Defence and Trade Committee chairperson Tim van de Molen, and Labour's foreign affairs spokesperson David Parker on a tour of five Pacific countries Solomon Islands, Papua New Guinea, Vanuatu, New Caledonia and Tuvalu between 11 and 18 May. Besides strengthening bilateral relations, other key issues include climate change, development policies and stability. On 12 May, Peters met with Solomon Islands Prime Minister Jeremiah Manele, who had succeeded Manasseh Sogavare following the 2024 Solomon Islands general election. On 14 May, Peters cancelled plans to visit New Caledonia in response to the 2024 New Caledonia unrest.

On 7 June 2024, Peters announced that New Zealand would resume its annual NZ$1 million funding to UNRWA (the United Nations Relief and Works Agency) that month. Between 4 and 13 June, Peters undertook state visits to Vietnam, Malaysia, the Philippines and Timor Leste where he met with several heads of government, state and foreign ministers including Vietnamese prime minister Pham Minh Chinh, Vietnamese Foreign Minister Bùi Thanh Sơn, Malaysian prime minister Anwar Ibrahim, Filipino President Bongbong Marcos, Filipino Foreign Secretary Enrique Manalo and East Timorese President José Ramos-Horta.

Between 16 and 18 July 2024, Peters attended the 10th Pacific Islands Leaders Meeting (PALM10) in Tokyo with other members of the Pacific Islands Forum, French Polynesia and host country Japan. During the conference, he outlined New Zealand's "foreign policy reset" called on the Forum to facilitate mediation following the 2024 New Caledonia unrest. While in Tokyo, Peters also met with Japanese prime minister Fumio Kishida, Chief Cabinet Secretary Yoshimasa Hayashi, and Defence Minister Minoru Kihara to reaffirm bilateral cooperation in engaging with the Pacific.

During the PALM10 conference in mid-July 2024, Peters questioned the legitimacy of the 2021 New Caledonian independence referendum due to the low 44% turnout, stating that "within the letter of the law ... but it was not within the spirit of it." In response, French ambassador to the Pacific Veronique Roger-Lacan accused Peters of interfering in a French internal matter. Meanwhile, the Kanaky Aotearoa Solidarity group expressed disappointment that Peters had not supported the Melanesian Spearhead Group's calls for a UN mission to New Caledonia.

Between 8 and 16 August 2024, Peters led a delegation to visit Fiji and the three Micronesian states of Marshall Islands, Federated States of Micronesia and Palau as part of New Zealand's Pacific reset strategy. On 12 August, Peters announced that New Zealand would invest NZ$6.2 million to help the Marshall Islands deal with natural disasters and climate change management.

In mid October 2024, Peters rebuffed Cook Islands prime minister Mark Brown's proposal for a separate Cook Islands passport. He questioned whether Cook Islanders supported Brown's proposal and warned of its implications for the territory's status as an associated state. Brown responded that the Cook Islands passport proposal would not affect the territory's constitutional relationship with New Zealand. Tuaine Unuia, the Clerk of the House of Ariki, said that the House supported Brown's proposal. On 23 December, Peters' office clarified that the Cook Islands would not be able to have its own passport, citizenship and United Nations membership without attaining independence; which would have to be decided by the Cook Islanders via a referendum.

In late January 2025, Peters announced that the New Zealand Government would review its bilateral aid programme to Kiribati after Kiribati President Taneti Maamau cancelled three pre-arranged meetings including one scheduled for mid January 2025. The NZ Government had wanted to discuss how NZ$102 million worth of aid funding allocated to Kiribati between 2021 and 2024 was being spent. In response, Kiribati education minister Alexander Teabo claimed that Maamu was unavailable due to a pre-planned Catholic religious event. In response, Peters rejected Teabo's claim that Maamu had a pre-planned commitment, countering that Maamu himself had arranged to meet with him on 21 and 22 January. Labour Party leader Chris Hipkins, Green MP Ricardo Menéndez March and Australian National University Development Policy Centre fellow Terence Wood expressed concern that the suspension of New Zealand developmental aid to Kiribati was counter-productive and could lead the island nation to align closer with China.

In early February 2025, Peters objected to Cook Islands Prime Minister Brown's plans to sign a partnership agreement with China during a state visit to China between 10 and 14 February, describing it as a breach of the free association agreement between New Zealand and the Cook Islands. Peters said that neither New Zealand nor the Cook Islands people knew the contents of the agreement and described the partnership agreement as a "second upset" following Brown's aborted Cook Islands passport proposal. In response to Peters' criticism, Brown said that the partnership agreement did not involve security and defence issues but concerned economy and development matters. He also argued that the Cook Islands did not need to consult New Zealand on the matter.

On 13 February 2025, Peters spoke with Israeli foreign minister Gideon Sa'ar by phone about the importance of a ceasefire between Israel and Hamas and the need for its full implementation including the release of all hostages and the resumption of humanitarian aid to the Palestinians. Sa'ar also thanked Peters for New Zealand designating Hamas and the Houthis as terrorist organisations, and extended an invitation for Peters to visit Israel.

On 26 February 2025, Peters met with Chinese foreign minister Wang Yi to raise New Zealand's concerns about Chinese naval exercises in the Tasman Sea and China's recent partnership agreement with the Cook Islands. Wang agreed to consider New Zealand and Australian concerns that its military did not give enough notice before conducting live-fire exercises in the Tasman Sea.

On 6 March 2025, Peters dismissed Phil Goff as High Commissioner to the United Kingdom after Goff made remarks questioning Trump's understanding of history during a Q&A session with Finnish foreign minister Elina Valtonen at a Chatham House event in London. Peters said that Goff's remarks made him unsuitable to represent New Zealand in the UK and tasked the Secretary of Foreign Affairs and Trade, Bede Corry, with appointing a replacement.

On 20 May 2025, Peters joined 22 European, Australian, Canadian and Japanese foreign ministers and the European Union in issuing a joint statement calling on Israel to allow a full resumption of aid to Gaza. Israel has imposed a full-scale blockade on humanitarian aid since March 2025. Peters said

We believe the excuse Israel's got has long since evaporated away, given the suffering that's going on. Many countries share our view – that's why overnight we put out the statement.

On 11 June 2025, Peters announced that New Zealand would join the United Kingdom, Australia, Canada and Norway in imposing travel bans on Israeli national security minister Itamar Ben-Gvir and Finance Minister Bezalel Smotrich for allegedly inciting "extremist violence" against Palestinians in the West Bank. In a statement, Peters expressed sympathy with the Israeli people and condemned Hamas' refusal to release hostages. He said that the travel bans were aimed at "two individuals who are using their leadership positions to actively undermine peace and security and remove prospects for a two-state solution."

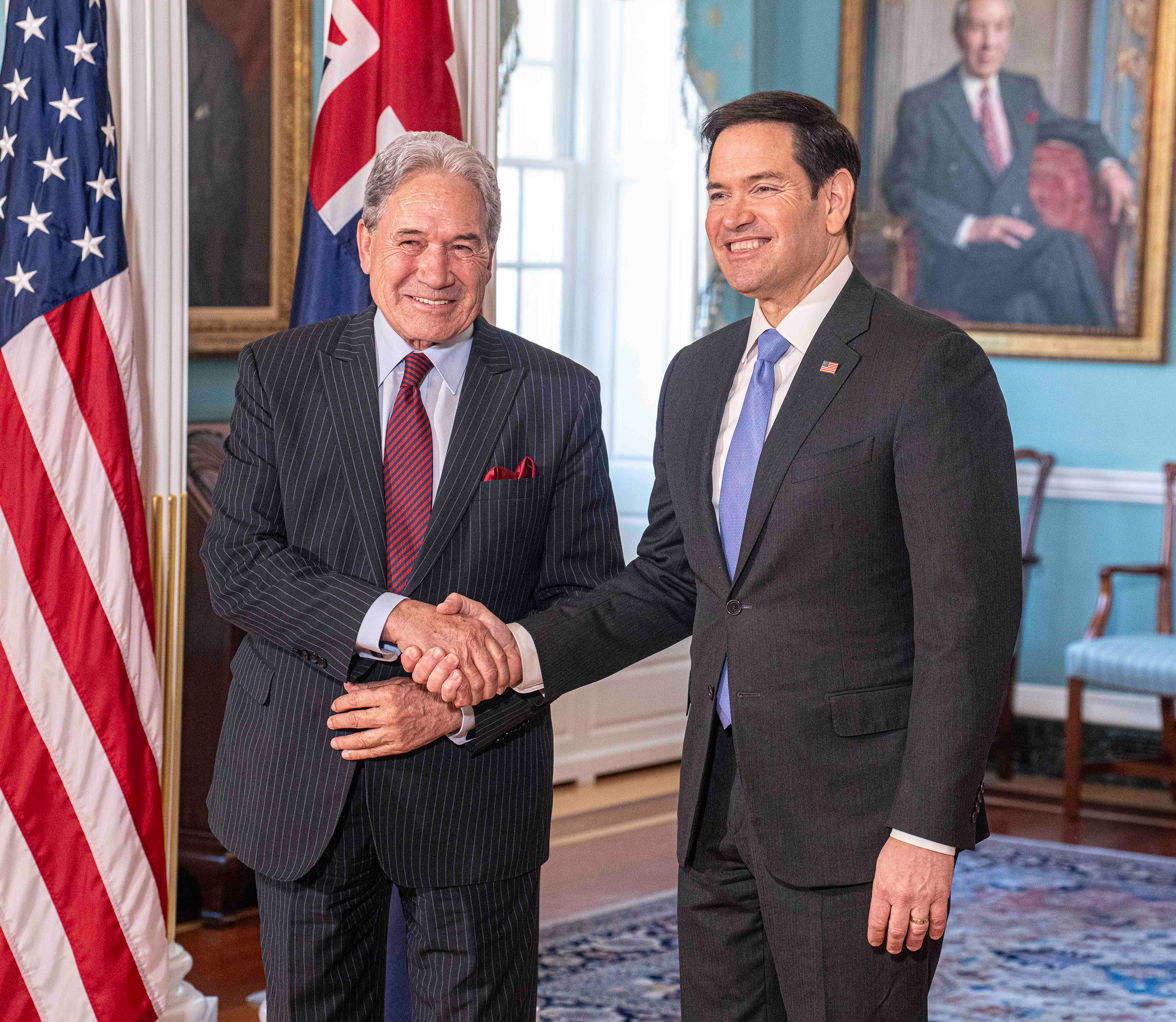
Peters with US Secretary of State Marco Rubio, 18 March 2025

On 19 June 2025, the NZ Government confirmed to the media that Peters had suspended New Zealand's nearly NZ$20 million worth of core funding to the Cook Islands in response to the Cook Islands' partnership agreement with China in February 2025. The Cook Islands government had signed the partnership agreement without consulting New Zealand, per the requirements of their free association relationship. Peters denied that the aid cuts were linked to Prime Minister Luxon's ongoing visit to China but said it was connected to New Zealand's special relationship with the Cook Islands, Niue and Tokelau.

In early August 2025, Peters attended a community event in Glen Innes marking the 60th anniversary of both the Cook Islands constitution and Cook Islands Māori language week along with several Pasifika MPs including Minister for Pacific Peoples Shane Reti and Labour's deputy leader Carmel Sepuloni. Peters gave a speech highlighting New Zealand-Cook Islands bilateral relations. Peters did not attend official celebrations in Rarotonga marking the 60th anniversary of the Cook Islands constitution due to a breakdown in bilateral relations caused by the Cook Islands' partnership agreement with China.

On 21 August, Peters and Defence Minister Collins announced that the Government would purchase two Airbus A321XLR jets and five new MH-60R Seahawks to boost the New Zealand Defence Force's capabilities.

In mid-September 2025, Peters said that the New Zealand would not support the UN report that described the situation in the Gaza Strip as genocide and would instead wait for the ICJ's decision. On 26 September, Peters affirmed the New Zealand Government's decision not to recognise Palestinian statehood during the 80th session of the United Nations General Assembly, stating "that it would encourage Hamas to resist negotiation in the belief it was winning the propaganda war."

Due to his position on not recognising Palestinian statehood, Peters was the target of protest action by Palestinian solidarity protesters in Auckland and Port Chalmers. On 6 October, a 29-year-old man damaged a window at Peter's Auckland home with a crowbar. The following day, the man turned himself in to the police, who charged him with burglary. The attack on Peters' home was condemned by Prime Minister Luxon, Labour leader Chris Hipkins and Green Party co-leader Chlöe Swarbrick. Peters accused Swarbrick of inciting violence and vandalism through her criticism of the Government's policies towards Israel-Palestine. On 7 October, telecommunications company One NZ terminated the contract of an actor who had doxxed Peters by sharing his street address online.

In mid-October 2025, Peters confirmed that New Zealand would be reinstating several United Nations sanctions targeting Iran including asset freezes and travel bans against certain sanctioned individuals and trade bans on certain nuclear and military products. These sanctions were reinstated after Iran withdrew from the JCPOA in September 2025 following the Twelve-Day War in mid-June 2025.

In late December 2025, Peters criticised a proposed Indian-New Zealand free trade agreement, saying that it disadvantaged New Zealand's dairy industry and boosted Indian immigration to New Zealand. He also invoked New Zealand First's "agree to disagree" provision of its coalition agreement with the National Party.

Following the Israeli–United States strikes on Iran which began the 2026 Iran war on 28 February 2026, Peters and Luxon issued a joint statement defending the strikes as a response to Iranian "threats to international peace and security" and called for a resumption of negotiations and adherence to international law.

In late March 2026, Peters and MFAT officials met with Cook Islands Prime Minister Mark Brown and Cook Islands officials at Peters' Auckland home. While the two parties did not reach an agreement on repairing the strained bilateral relationship, they agreed to continue political dialogue on resolving bilateral disagreements. On 2 April 2026, Peters and Brown signed a defence and security declaration in Rarotonga. Peter also confirmed that New Zealand would resume about NZ$29.8 million in annual aid funding to the islands territory; repairing mended bilateral relations, which has been strained in 2025 by the Cook Islands signing several partnership agreements with China. The defence and security declaration ensures that New Zealand would be privy to similar deals with third countries in the future.

In mid-May 2026, Peters addressed the Asia New Zealand Foundation's annual Asia Symposium in Wellington, advocating more investment in foreign affairs and defence. He argued that under-investment had hampered New Zealand's capabilities and influence on the international stage. Peters also claimed credit for protecting the Ministry of Foreign Affairs and Trade from the Government's budget cuts.

In mid October 2026, Peters as Foreign Minister instructed New Zealand's Permanent Representative in the United Nations to abstain from a non-binding vote in support of global pandemic prevention, preparedness and response. While the vast majority of member states supported the resolution, it was opposed by the United States, Israel and Argentina. NZ joined Paraguay in abstaining from the vote, citing a need to test the resolution against its national interest test. While Peters celebrated the abstention as a means of New Zealand exercising its sovereignty on health decision-making, the allied National Party's associate health minister Matt Doocey and opposition Labour leader Chris Hipkins expressed disagreement, saying that it went against New Zealand's traditional support for international cooperation.

=== Domestic politics ===
In late January 2024, Peters was part of a delegation of government ministers from the National and New Zealand First parties that attended the annual hui (meeting) at the Rātana Church's pā (village) near Whanganui. During the hui, Peters along with fellow NZ First MP Shane Jones and Prime Minister Christopher Luxon gave speeches, which were booed by members of the audience. In his speech, Peters criticised Labour and Te Pāti Māori's record for Māori and clashed with hecklers, stating that "if you're looking for trouble you've come to the right place." On 6 February 2024, Peters also spoke at the annual Waitangi Day gathering where protesters heckled his speech. Peters responded by telling protesters to "get an education" and "get some manners".

On 17 March 2024, Peters delivered a State of the Nation speech in Palmerston North where he likened the previous Labour Government's co-governance policies to "race-based theory" in Nazi Germany. He also claimed the Government's proposed tax cuts were still possible despite media reports that the Government was facing a NZ$5.6 billion deficit. Peters also criticised the opposition Labour, Green and Māori parties, accusing them of competing to be "most culturally woke." Peters also highlighted the migrant exploitation allegations against Green MP Darleen Tana and her husband. Peter also criticised the mainstream media for accepting government funding, allegedly favouring left-wing political narratives and agendas, and marginalising opposing views.

Peters' remarks likening co-governance to Nazism and the Holocaust were criticised by the Holocaust Centre of New Zealand's spokesperson Ben Kepes, who described them as offensive to Holocaust victims and survivors. Labour leader and leader of the opposition Chris Hipkins described Peters as a "drunk uncle at a wedding" and accused him of "using racism and anti-media rhetoric to divide the country." On 18 March, in an interview with Radio New Zealand, Peters doubled down on his comparison of co-governance with Nazi Germany's race-based theories. On 19 March, Prime Minister Luxon subsequently spoke to Peters about his co-governance remarks, stating that such comments by political leaders were "unhelpful" but defended his work as foreign minister. In response to media coverage and political criticism, Peters defended his remarks, claiming they had been "deliberately misrepresented." Peters said his remarks about Nazi Germany were a response to Te Pāti Maori co-leader Rawiri Waititi's remarks about Māori genes being superior. Peters also denied mentioning the Holocaust and genocide. In response to Peters' doubling down on his remarks, Hipkins accused Luxon of being unable to control Peters. Peters later announced that Luxon was "misinformed" by the media about his state of the nation speech, quoting Luxon that he never listened to it. British anarchist punk band Chumbawamba also objected to Peters using their song Tubthumping for political campaigning and expressed disagreement with his politics. They also asked their record label Sony to issue a cease and desist notice against Peters.

In mid June 2024, acting prime minister Peters and Housing Minister Chris Bishop jointly announced that the Government would begin consultation on policy changes that would allow "granny flats" (or dwellings of 60 meters or less) to be built outside of the resource consent process.

In late June 2024, Peters invoked the first use of the "agree to disagree" provisions in the coalition agreements in response to the Government's announcement that it would allow the Royal Commission of Inquiry into COVID-19 Lessons Learned in its present form and retain Tony Blakely as its chair. The Government also confirmed that the second phase of the inquiry would examine vaccine efficacy and safety, the use of vaccine mandates and the socio-economic disruption caused by the Government's pandemic response policies. Peters also claimed that the initial inquiry was "designed to cover the Labour Party's backside, to cover their incompetence and to cover the gross waste of the Covid lockdown months." In response, Labour leader Chris Hipkins accused Peters of appealing to conspiracy theorists and joked that Peters would prefer former TVNZ host and anti-vaccination activist Liz Gunn as a commissioner. Peters countered by saying that Hipkins could "go down the rabbit hole that he's talking about and stay down there."

After the Interislander ferry Aratere ran aground after leaving Picton harbour on 21 June, Peters alleged in mid-July 2024 that KiwiRail had covered up the cause of the Aratere's grounding and claimed that a crew member had left the boat on autopilot while having a cup of coffee. Peters' allegations were disputed by Interislander operations general manager Duncan Roy. Interislander subsequently acknowledged that a crew member had prematurely selected a turn on the autopilot that caused the ferry to sail off course to Titoki Bay instead of its intended shore point "The Snout."

On 23 March 2025, Peters delivered a state of the nation speech at the James Hay Theatre in Christchurch, focusing on alleged wokeism and DEI issues. The event was picketed by both pro and anti-greyhound racing, pro-Palestinian and pro-Israel protesters.

On 31 May 2025, ACT leader David Seymour succeeded Peters as deputy prime minister, under the terms of the coalition agreement in November 2023. In late May 2025, Peters told Radio New Zealand that his role as deputy prime minister had been to "offer experience... in an environment where a lot of ministers were new," but added that the position came with a heavier workload and limits around expression. After resigning as deputy prime minister, Peters has expressed interest in focusing on New Zealand First's election campaign during the 2026 New Zealand general election including roadshows. In late May, Peters also "permanently" ruled out working with Labour leader Chris Hipkins.

During the NZ First's annual conference on 7 September 2025, Peters proposed increasing compulsory KiwiSaver contributions to ten percent, lowering taxes and requiring migrants to sign a values statement if the party was re-elected at the 2026 general election. He also announced that Cabinet had agreed to introduce NZ First's legislation to make English an official language. 1,000 supporters attended the conference, which was held in Palmerston North. Pro-greyhound racing and Palestine solidarity protesters picketed the conference building.

On 13 November 2025, Peters and his fellow NZ First MPs voted in favour of the Government's contentious Regulatory Standards Act 2025 during its third reading. On 20 November, Peters announced that NZ First would repeal the legislation if re-elected in 2026, stating that the party had opposed the Regulatory Standards Bill but had reluctantly supported it due to ACT's coalition agreement with National. In response, ACT leader David Seymour defended the Regulatory Standards Act accused Peters of seeking to form a coalition with the opposition Labour Party.

In late April 2026, Winston Peters was involved in a political dispute with Prime Minister Christopher Luxon over the release of Official Information Act documents relating to New Zealand's response to United States–led military strikes on Iran. The released emails indicated that Luxon had sought advice on whether New Zealand should express more explicit public support for the strikes, aligning more closely with allies such as Australia, while Peters preferred maintaining a neutral position that neither endorsed nor condemned the action. Luxon criticised the release of the emails, stating it "put politics ahead of the national interest" and initially claimed that Peters had acknowledged making a mistake. Peters later disputed this characterisation, stating he had reconsidered and did not believe releasing the information was an error. He maintained that his approach reflected New Zealand's foreign policy interests and rejected suggestions that the episode indicated instability within the coalition government.

=== Minister for Racing ===
On 10 December 2024 Peters, as minister for racing announced that the New Zealand Government would ban greyhound racing by July 2026. In addition, the Government pass urgent legislation preventing the unlawful killings of greyhounds during that transition period.

=== Minister for Rail ===
On 11 December 2024, Peters was appointed as the minister for rail. On 1 March 2025, Peters embarked on an international tender to find a builder to build two cheaper and smaller rail-enabled ferries to replace the current Interislander vessels. The Government's goal is to have the replacement ferries operational by 2029. He also visited HD Hyundai Mipo's headquarters in Seoul to discuss the tender proposal. Peters told Radio New Zealand that Hyundai was open to considering bidding to build the two replacement ferries based on the new size specifications.

On 31 March 2025, Peters released details of the two new Interislander replacement ferries, which will be 200m long, 28m wide and have rail decks. The ferries are expected to be completed by Christmas 2029. The Government would also establish a company called Ferry Holdings to replace port infrastructure at Picton and to upgrade the Wellington infrastructure. Peters confirmed that the government was searching for a shipyard to build the ferries and is expected to sign a contract in late 2025. KiwiRail Chief Executive Peter Reidy welcomed news that the two replacement ferries would be rail enabled while Mayor of Marlborough Nadine Taylor said the announcement would give certainty to plan the new port infrastructure at Picton.

On 20 May, Peters announced that the Government would be allocating NZ$461 million to upgrading New Zealand's freight rail network and NZ$140 million to upgrading the metropolitan passenger rail networks in Wellington and Auckland. During the press conference at Wellington Railway Station, Peters traded barbs with a heckler objecting to the suspension of three Te Pāti Māori MPs from Parliament. The heckler's employer Tonkin + Taylor apologised to Peters and commenced an investigation into the employee. Peters' described the heckler's behaviour as disgraceful and said he would support the employee's dismissal. In response, the Free Speech Union spokesman Nick Hanne asked Tonkin + Taylor to respect the employee's freedom of expression.

On 15 August 2025, Peters confirmed that KiwiRail had agreed to pay HD Hyundai Mipo NZ$144 million in compensation for the New Zealand Government's 2023 cancellation of the Project iRex ferries. On 14 October 2025, Peters confirmed that the state-owned Ferry Holdings Limited had contracted the Chinese state-owned shipyard COMEC (formerly the Guangzhou Shipyard International) to construct two new rail-enabled Interislander ferries, which are expected to be delivered in 2029. Each of the two new ferries would be able to carry 1,500 passengers and 2.4 km of lanes for trucks, cars and 40 rail wagons. To accommodate the new ferries, the Government confirmed that new wharves, linkspans and a rail overbridge would be built in Picton while Wellington's wharf would be expanded.

In July 2026, he defended naming one of the new ferries connecting the North and South Islands after James Cook, saying that "a mature country does not run from its history".

=== 2026 general election ===
During NZ First's State of the Nation address in Tauranga on 22 March 2026, Peters announced that the party would campaign on splitting the four major power companies and reducing proper prices during the 2026 New Zealand general election. He also reiterated his opposition to Fonterra's sale of several brands to Lactalis, the proposed New Zealand-India free trade agreement and selling the Government's shares in national carrier Air New Zealand. Former National MP and NewZeal leader Alfred Ngaro also announced that he would be standing as a candidate for NZ First. During the 2026 election, Peters stood solely on the NZ First party list and was ranked first place. Based on preliminary results, he was elected into the New Zealand Parliament on the NZ First list.

== Views and policies ==
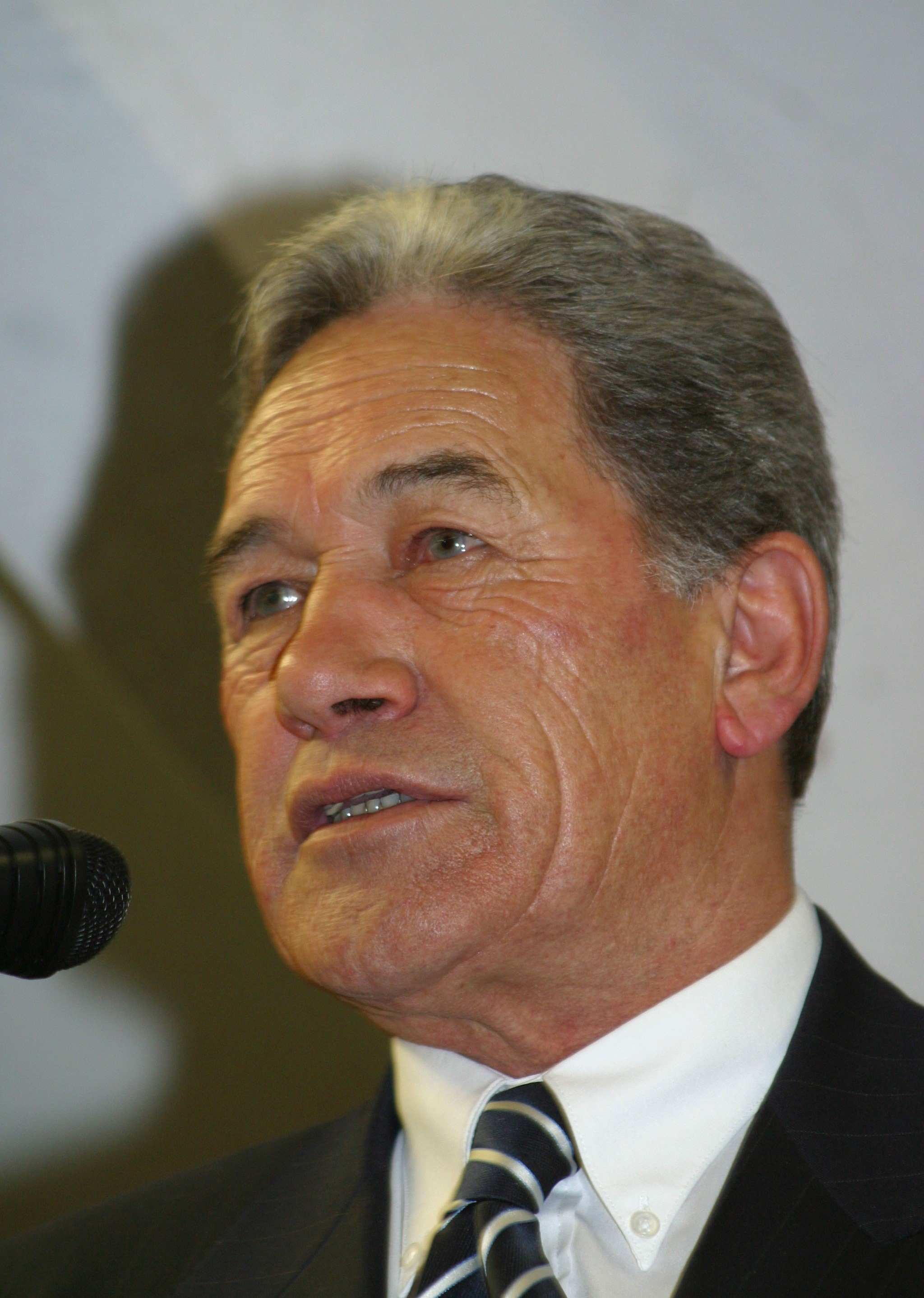
Peters speaks to Grey Power members, August 2011

=== Political stance ===
Peters has been labelled a nationalist and a populist by political commentators. He has long advocated direct democracy in the form of "binding citizen initiated referenda", to create "a democracy that is of the people and for the people", while forcing government "to accept the will of the people". Peters has also used anti-establishment and anti-elite rhetoric, such as criticising what he regards as the "intellectually arrogant elite in government and bureaucratic circles". Peters is often known widely as simply Winston, due to the ubiquity of his presence in New Zealand public life spanning five decades. Peters' "charisma and effervescence" has often manifested through his populist rhetoric.

=== Economic and welfare issues ===
He favours cutting taxes; however, he was critical of the free market policies enacted by the fourth Labour and fourth National governments in the 1980s and 1990s, opposing privatisations and deregulation. His platform retains elements of National Party economic policy from the Muldoon era.

Peters supports compulsory superannuation schemes for all New Zealanders. He has cultivated support among the elderly in particular, and support for his party has been concentrated among New Zealanders over 60 years of age.

=== Immigration ===
Peters is opposed to high levels of immigration, in order "to avoid New Zealand's identity, values and heritage being swamped". He has highlighted the "threat" of immigration in both cultural and economic terms. Peters has on several occasions characterised the rate of Asian immigration into New Zealand as too high; in 2004, he stated: "We are being dragged into the status of an Asian colony and it is time that New Zealanders were placed first in their own country." On 26 April 2005, he said: "Māori will be disturbed to know that in 17 years' time they will be outnumbered by Asians in New Zealand", an estimate disputed by Statistics New Zealand, the government's statistics bureau. Peters responded that Statistics New Zealand had underestimated the growth-rate of the Asian community in the past.

In 2000 Peters described the risk of dog meat gaining popularity in New Zealand if Asian immigration continued, saying that such "abused flesh is highly valued as an aphrodisiac by these ghouls". In 2002, he said "we place our country at risk by bringing in thousands of people whose views are formed by alien cultures and rigid religious practices", and claimed he had "Chinese blood" after his comments sparked controversy. Peters' views on immigration came into conflict with those of the Labour Party when forming a government with them after the 2005 election.

In June 2016, Peters advocated interviewing immigrants and reducing immigration numbers between 7,000 and 15,000 a year on TVNZ's Q+A show. During the interview, he stated that he would want prospective migrants "to salute our flag, respect our laws, honour our institutions and, above all, don't bring absolutely anti-women attitudes with them, treating women like cattle, like fourth-class citizens". Peters also clarified that he was not opposed to refugees nor Muslim migrants per se. In addition, Peters argued that reducing immigration would stabilise the Auckland housing market and enable younger and poorer New Zealanders to buy their first home.

In July 2026, Peters told Green MP Lawrence Xu-Nan, who was born in China but moved to New Zealand as a child in 1994, to "go back to your own country", a comment characterised by New Zealand's Race Relations Commissioner as "racist". Prime Minister Christopher Luxon did not condone the comments, labelling them as "very offensive and completely inappropriate", but opted to retain Peters as foreign minister on 31 July. In a TVNZ debate with Peters on 13 October 2026, Opportunity Party leader Qiulae Wong described Peters' comments as "clearly racist" and ruled out serving in any government where Peters was foreign minister. Peters maintained as of 13 October 2026 that his comments were not racist.

=== Feuds with other politicians ===
Peters has a history of personally insulting politicians he disagrees with across the political spectrum. The Spinoff has described Peters as having "dexterity of language that can make his insults really sing". In May 2003, he said Prime Minister Helen Clark was the "only politician in the Western world who can talk on foreign affairs with both feet in her mouth", and in 2005 described National MP Murray McCully as "the only member of this House to eat a banana sideways" when he challenged Peters on it. In 2012, he described National Party MP Gerry Brownlee as "illiterate woodwork teacher", and later called Brownlee, Māori Party co-leader Marama Fox and attorney-general Chris Finlayson an "unsightly trio of drama queens". In 2017, he described celebrity political investor Gareth Morgan as "a toothless sheep... a thinned-out version of Kim Dotcom". When Simon Bridges led the National Party, Peters labelled him a "joke" during question time.

==== David Seymour ====
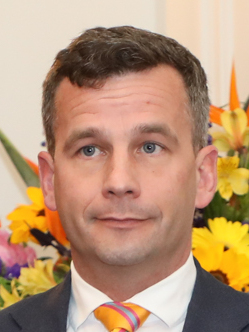
Peters' previously long-standing feud with David Seymour (pictured) had routinely gained media coverage

Peters is also known for his long-standing feud with ACT New Zealand leader and current coalition partner David Seymour. The two men have been regarded as rivals on a personal as well as a political level, exchanging insults since at least 2017. Although their relationship has reportedly stabilised since the formation of the Sixth National Government, Peters has mocked Seymour repetitively, both during the Sixth Labour Government and then afterwards in opposition. Peters has called Seymour an "accidental Māori", a "cuckolded puppet", a "political cuckold" (twice), and a "chihuahua at the front gate barking at every cat, human being or fellow dog that passes by". In one notable incident in July 2020, Peters subsequently threatened to savage Seymour in a boxing match, addressing him directly on Twitter and saying "I reckon you'd last 10 seconds in the ring with me", and that "there'd be three hits – you hitting me, me hitting you, and the ambulance hitting 100. Thank your lucky stars I'm not into physical violence." Seymour responded with "I wouldn't fight him like that, it would be elder abuse".

Prior to the government formation of the National–NZ First–ACT coalition in 2023, Seymour dismissed Peters by saying "we're not going to sit around the cabinet table with this clown". After the election, Seymour and the ACT Party attempted to contact Peters via text and email multiple times, to no response. Peters denied deliberately ignoring Seymour and claimed he thought the message was fake.

==== Bob Carr ====
Peters has also insulted Bob Carr, former Australian minister of foreign affairs and premier of New South Wales, for his stance on AUKUS. After Carr appeared at a Wellington event with Helen Clark in which he criticised AUKUS, Peters appeared on RNZ's Morning Report and claimed Carr was "nothing more than a Chinese puppet". Carr later announced he would sue Peters for defamation.

==== Lawrence Xu-Nan ====
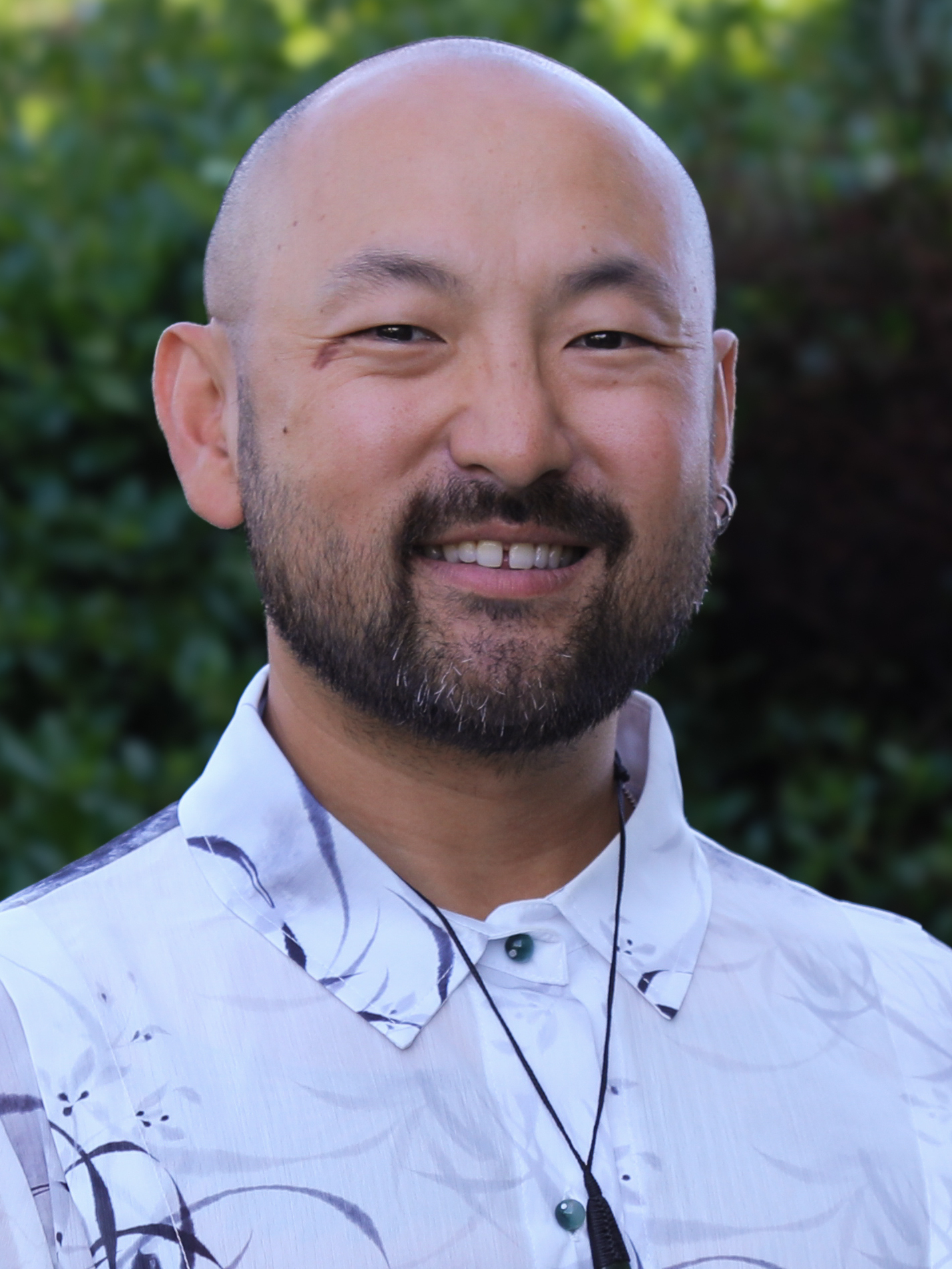
Peters' 2026 spat with Green MP Lawrence Xu-Nan attracted domestic and international political and media attention.

On 30 July 2026, Peters told Green Party MP Lawrence Xu-Nan to "go back to your own country" during a parliamentary debate on the previous Government's COVID-19 response. The remark drew condemnation as racist and offensive from across Parliament, including Green co-leader Marama Davidson, PM Luxon, National's Simeon Brown and Todd McClay, Green MP Tamatha Paul, Labour's Carmel Sepuloni, and ACT leader David Seymour. NZ First deputy leader Shane Jones instead accused Xu-Nan of provoking Peters.

Chinese Ambassador Wang Xiaoling also weighed in publicly. Peters defended his remarks as free speech and accused critics of being "communist shills"; former PM Helen Clark called them dangerous given China's status as New Zealand's largest trading partner.

Luxon stood by Peters as Foreign Minister while calling the remarks "very offensive and completely inappropriate." National deputy leader Nicola Willis called them "grossly offensive," and both Labour's Chris Hipkins and Opportunity Party leader Qiulae Wong ruled out working with Peters.

In early August, the Migrant Workers Association of Aotearoa staged a mock guillotine execution of a Peters effigy in Auckland, calling it satire and urging Luxon to sack Peters and Jones. Peters called it a "call for violence" warranting police referral; Auckland police said no complaints had been received.

Peters met Luxon privately on 3 August and refused to apologise the next day, saying he was addressing "victims" of a COVID inquiry cover-up rather than Xu-Nan personally. On 6 August, Speaker Gerry Brownlee declined a Green Party request to have Peters withdraw and apologise.

=== Foreign affairs ===
Peters is an ardent supporter of Brexit, having made a speech to the British House of Lords praising the idea ahead of that year's referendum on the issue. In the same speech, he claimed he felt "apprehension and dismay" at the "invasion" of the United Kingdom by "EU nationals from countries like Poland and Romania". In June 2016, he told the New Zealand Parliament that he hoped "Britain [will] show its independence from an ungrateful European parliamentary yoke and come back to the Commonwealth". He is friends with Reform UK leader Nigel Farage and the significant Vote Leave campaign funder Arron Banks. In 2020, Banks' group Leave.EU made multiple posts praising Peters for his pro-Brexit stance and for his government's response to the COVID-19 pandemic (but without mentioning Jacinda Ardern). Later that year, Peters confirmed that Brexit political operatives were working on the unsuccessful New Zealand First campaign to return to Parliament. In 2018, Farage reiterated his affection for Peters and claimed he was New Zealand's "own version" of Donald Trump.

In March 2017, Peters criticised the then Foreign Minister Murray McCully for endorsing United Nations Security Council Resolution 2334 without consulting his fellow Cabinet ministers. The resolution controversially condemned Israeli settlement expansion in the West Bank and passed with the support of the United Nations Security Council including New Zealand, which held a rotating membership on the council.

In mid April 2025, Peters expressed disagreement with Prime Minister Luxon for participating in a series of phone calls with several European Union and Indo-Pacific leaders in response to the second Trump Administration's tariffs. Peters stated:

I hope that he'll get my message and he'll call me next time... Markets lose their nerve. Share market speculators lose their nerve. Politicians should not lose their nerve, and that's my advice

=== Islamophobia ===
In 2005, Peters made a speech titled The End Of Tolerance. In it he said that New Zealand had always been a nation of immigrants but was not a nation of Islamic immigrants. He said "In New Zealand the Muslim community have been quick to show us their more moderate face, but as some media reports have shown, there is a militant underbelly here as well. These two groups, the moderate and militant, fit hand and glove everywhere they exist. Underneath it all the agenda is to promote fundamentalist Islam." He rejected calls for an apology from those who believed the speech to be an attack on Muslim immigrants. Radio New Zealand said that "Mr Peters told Morning Report (RNZ) the comments were made in the context of recent terror attacks in London and that Imams around the world were saying the same thing."

Peters has condemned discrimination on the basis of religion and he denounced Islamophobia following the Christchurch mosque shootings. He called for the terrorist perpetrator to be deported to his home country, Australia.

In March 2022, Indian drama film The Kashmir Files had received an R16 classification from the New Zealand Classification Office, with a scheduled release date of 24 March 2022. Members of the Muslim community in New Zealand raised concerns with chief censor David Shanks that the film could promote Islamophobia, citing intercommunal tensions relating to the film's release in India. Shanks stated that the film's R16 classification did not mean that the film was being banned. In response to the film's R16 classification in New Zealand, Peters claimed that the film's age restricted classification amounted to censorship of terrorist actions during the 9/11 attacks and the Christchurch mosque shootings. He added that efforts towards combating Islamophobia should not be used to "shield the actions of terrorists in the name of Islam".

=== LGBT issues and abortion ===
In 1986, Peters voted, together with all but three of his fellow National MPs, against the Homosexual Law Reform Act which decriminalised sexual acts between males over 16. In 2012, Peters voted, together with all of his fellow New Zealand First MPs, against the Marriage Amendment Bill, which aimed to permit same sex marriage in New Zealand. Peters also had called for a referendum on the issue.

In 2025, New Zealand First introduced a Member's bill, Legislation (Definitions of Woman and Man) Amendment Bill that would add new sections 13A and 13B to the Legislation Act 2019 defining the terms "man" and "women" in New Zealand law. Following protests and a national day of action on 13 June 2026, Peters referred to protestors as "rent-a-crowd" in a Facebook post. The activist group, Rainbow Action Tāmaki sent a letter to Peters asking him to delete the post, publicly apologise, and make a small donation to RainbowYouth, which Peters refused to do.

In early October 2026, Peters expressed support for reversing New Zealand's ban on conversion therapy during an online interview with Family First New Zealand's leader Bob McCoskrie. He said that NZ First would have opposed the Conversion Practices Prohibition Legislation Act 2022 had the party been in Parliament when the bill passed into law in 2022. However, Peters did not make repealing the conversion therapy ban an election policy for the 2026 general election. During the same interview, Peters also expressed disagreement with abortion, saying that life began at conception. Despite describing abortion as amounting to murder or assassination depending on the stage, he ruled out repealing the Abortion Legislation Act 2020, stating that New Zealand's abortion laws were settled and that he would not be changing them.

=== Māori issues ===
In a 2023 interview with Moana Maniapoto he declared that "all my life I have worked for Māori", protesting against comparisons to David Seymour.

During the 2017 New Zealand general election, Peters called for the abolition of Māori seats. After entering into a coalition government with Labour, Peters dropped his objection to the Māori seats, citing the defeat of the Māori Party.

Following the 2020 New Zealand general election, Peters objected to the Labour Government's promotion of the Māori language and expansion of Māori wards and constituencies in local government councils. During the 2023 New Zealand general election, Peters campaigned on removing Māori names from government departments, against so-called separatism, withdrawing New Zealand from the United Nations Declaration on the Rights of Indigenous People, and opposed co-governance and renaming New Zealand Aotearoa. In September 2023, Peters claimed that Māori were not indigenous to New Zealand on the grounds that they originated in the Cook Islands and China.

Peter's remarks on Māori issues during the 2023 general election campaign led 17 Māori leaders including David Letele to pen an open letter to National Party leader Christopher Luxon calling on him to condemn NZ First's alleged racist comments. In response, Peters accused the letter writers of racism and reiterated his claims that co-governance was Apartheid.

In mid March 2024, Peters controversially likened co-governance to Nazi race theory, drawing criticism from the Holocaust Centre of New Zealand's spokesperson Ben Kepes and Labour Party leader Chris Hipkins. Later that month, Peters objected to the University of Auckland's decision to create "safe zones" for Māori and Pasifika students, stating that some universities had become a haven for "woke cultural brainwashing." He also compared the policy to the Ku Klux Klan and Apartheid.

On 23 August 2024, Peters stated during Question Time in Parliament that he was willing to change his mind on ACT's Treaty Principles Bill "if there was prevailing compelling evidence to change one's mind." When Labour leader Chris Hipkins pressed Peters further on the matter, Peters said that Māori leaders Peter Buck, Maui Pomare and James Carroll had concluded there were no Principles of the Treaty of Waitangi. Peters' remarks had contradicted statements by Christopher Luxon and Shane Jones during Māori King Tūheitia Paki's Koroneihana (coronation anniversary celebration) that the National and NZ First parties would not support the Treaty Principles Bill beyond its first reading.

On 18 February 2026, Winston Peters twice criticised Green MP Teanau Tuiono for referring to New Zealand by its Māori name Aotearoa during a Question Time debate on New Zealand's climate aid policies to the Pacific. In response, Labour leader Chris Hipkins accused Peters of making racist remarks toward the ethnic Cook Islander MP while Speaker Brownlee cautioned Peters against asking unacceptable questions." The following day, Peters gave a speech supporting a proposed government bill designating the English language as an official language of New Zealand. He alleged that the proliferation of the Māori language in health and transportation was causing confusion. Several opposition MPs including Labour MPs Duncan Webb, Ayesha Verrall, Greens co-leader Chlöe Swarbrick and Te Pāti Māori MP Oriini Kaipara described the bill as wasteful and divisive.

=== Media ===
Peters has a fraught relationship with the New Zealand media. In the run up to the 2011 New Zealand general election, he claimed that New Zealand First had been banned from leaders' debates on TVNZ and Radio New Zealand, and ignored by The New Zealand Herald, Dominion Post and The Press.

In 2002, Peters described big city media commentators as "smart alec, arrogant, quiche eating, chardonnay drinking, pinky finger pointing snobbery, fart blossom." In 2023, his interactions with them became increasingly confrontational. After an antagonistic interview with TVNZ journalist Jack Tame, he referred to him as a "left-wing shill" and a "moron". After becoming Deputy Prime Minister in the Sixth National Government, Peters accused TVNZ and Radio NZ on 28 November of lacking editorial independence since they had accepted funding from the previous Labour Government's Public Interest Journalism Fund (PIJF), which included a controversial clause to honour the Treaty of Waitangi and to use the Māori language. On 28 November, Andrew Shaw, a veteran broadcaster who served on the board of New Zealand On Air (which oversaw the PIJF funding), resigned after social media posts in which he said of Peters: "He's not truthful. He's not accurate. He's malicious and he is here on behalf of international tobacco." The comments violated NZ On Air's code of conduct, which requires board members to maintain political impartiality. On 29 November, Peters confirmed that he was "at war" with the press gallery and mainstream media. While Peters has avoided mainstream media outlets, he has taken part in lengthy interviews with Sean Plunket's online radio station The Platform.

In response, Prime Minister Christopher Luxon did not condemn Peters's bribery allegations and said National had not agreed with the fund either, and that it led to perceptions of bias. ACT leader David Seymour disputed Peters allegations against the Public Interest Journalism Fund, stating that "many people felt that [the PIJF] was distorting [media's] priorities. I don't know that it did, for the simple reason that it's a tiny amount of overall revenue and journalists generally, while they may have a view I disagree with in some cases, they're pretty fierce about that independence. The whole thing [notions of bribery] isn't quite plausible." In addition, Finance Minister Nicola Willis stated that Peters was not the only MP who was critical of the media but added "I think there's a bit of hyperbole in there, but that's Winston being Winston."

On 18 December 2023, Reporters Without Borders Asia-Pacific Bureau Director Cédric Alviani criticised Peters' attacks on journalists and media organisations, and called on Prime Minister Luxon to reaffirm his government's support to press freedom. The media watchdog cited Peters' remarks that he was at war with the media, his criticism of the Public Interest Journalism Fund, his questioning of the editorial independence of broadcasters TVNZ and Radio New Zealand, and his description of TVNZ journalist Jack Tame as a "dirt merchant." Alviani expressed concerns that these verbal attacks could imperil the media sector if they were used to support a policy of restricting the right to information.

After Warner Bros. Discovery announced plans to shut down television news service Newshub by late June 2024, Peters described the imminent closure of Newshub as "obviously devastating not only for those who will lose their jobs, but it is also seriously concerning for the robustness of our media scene." He also attributed the struggles facing Newshub and other New Zealand media outlets to a lack of trust caused by the mainstream media failing to be "unbiased, independent and non-political."

In mid April 2025, Peters criticised public broadcaster Radio New Zealand during an interview discussing his member's bill defining women. When RNZ host Corin Dann put forward arguments from opposition parties opposing the bill, Peters accused Dann of advancing the "woke left" argument and threatened to cut taxpayer funding. Peters said:

You can't help yourself, you're doing most of the talking aren't you? The fact is you're paid for by the tax payer and sooner or later we're going to cut that water off too because you’re an abuse on the taxpayer, you’re not hearing both sides of the story, you keep on putting the argument of the woke left.

During the interview, Peters also accused former NZ First MP Tracey Martin of pushing the Births, Deaths, Marriages, and Relationships Registration Act 2021 behind his back. In response, Martin accused Peters of making a personal attack and spreading disinformation. In response to calls by Labour leader Chris Hipkins for Prime Minister Luxon to intervene, Luxon defended Peters' style of communicating with the media.

== Honours and awards ==
In 1990, Peters was awarded the New Zealand 1990 Commemoration Medal.

On 21 May 1998, Peters was appointed to the Privy Council of the United Kingdom and gained the style of "The Right Honourable".

In 2007, Peters was bestowed with the chiefly Samoan title Vaovasamanaia, meaning "beautiful, handsome, awesome, delighted and joyful".

== Personal life ==
Peters was married to Louise, but they have separated. The couple have two children, a son named Joel Peters and a daughter named Bree Peters, who is an actress. His current partner is Jan Trotman.

== See also ==
- Populism in New Zealand
- Contents of the United States diplomatic cables leak (New Zealand)
- List of international trips made by Winston Peters as Minister of Foreign Affairs of New Zealand
- List of longest-serving members of the New Zealand Parliament

== Works cited ==
- Hames, Martin (1995). Winston First: The unauthorised account of Winston Peters' career. Auckland: Random House New Zealand. ISBN 1869412575.
- Boston, Jonathan (1997). From campaign to coalition: New Zealand's first general election under proportional representation (1st publ ed.). Palmerston North: Dunmore Press. ISBN 0864693141.
- Vowles, Jack (2002). Proportional representation on trial. Auckland, N.Z: Auckland University Press. ISBN 9781869402655.
- Miller, Raymond; Mintrom, Michael (2006). Political leadership in New Zealand. Auckland: Auckland Univ. Press. ISBN 9781869403584.
- Wishart, Ian (2014). Winston: The Story of a Political Phenomenon (1st ed.). Auckland: Howling at the Moon Publishing. ISBN 9780994106414.

New Zealand Parliament
Preceded by Malcolm Douglas	Member of Parliament for Hunua; 1978–1981	Succeeded by Colin Moyle
Preceded by Keith Allen	Member of Parliament for Tauranga; 1984–2005	Succeeded by Bob Clarkson
Preceded by Mike Sabin	Member of Parliament for Northland; 2015–2017	Succeeded by Matt King
Political offices
Preceded by Koro Wētere	Minister of Māori Affairs; 1990–1991	Succeeded by Doug Kidd
New office	Treasurer of New Zealand; 1996–1998	Succeeded by Bill Birch
Preceded by Todd McClay	Minister for State Owned Enterprises; 2017–2020	Succeeded by David Clark
Preceded by Don McKinnon	Deputy Prime Minister of New Zealand; 1996–1998; 2017–2020; 2023–2025	Succeeded by Wyatt Creech
Preceded by Paula Bennett	Deputy Prime Minister of New Zealand; 1996–1998; 2017–2020; 2023–2025	Succeeded by Grant Robertson
Preceded by Carmel Sepuloni	Deputy Prime Minister of New Zealand; 1996–1998; 2017–2020; 2023–2025	Succeeded by David Seymour
Preceded by Phil Goff	Minister of Foreign Affairs; 2005–2008; 2017–2020; 2023–present	Succeeded by Helen Clark (acting)
Preceded by Gerry Brownlee	Minister of Foreign Affairs; 2005–2008; 2017–2020; 2023–present	Succeeded by Nanaia Mahuta
Preceded by Grant Robertson	Minister of Foreign Affairs; 2005–2008; 2017–2020; 2023–present	Incumbent
Preceded by Damien O'Connor	Minister for Racing; 2005–2008; 2017–2020; 2023–present	Succeeded by John Carter
Preceded by David Bennett	Minister for Racing; 2005–2008; 2017–2020; 2023–present	Succeeded by Grant Robertson
Preceded by Kieran McAnulty	Minister for Racing; 2005–2008; 2017–2020; 2023–present	Incumbent
Preceded by Vacant	Minister for Rail; 2024–present	Incumbent
Party political offices
New political party	Leader of New Zealand First; 1993–present	Incumbent
