= Coalition of chaos =

Political slogan today associated with 2023 New Zealand general election

In New Zealand politics, the phrase "coalition of chaos" was widely used during the 2023 New Zealand general election campaign. The phrase was a pejorative term used primarily by Christopher Luxon, Leader of the New Zealand National Party to describe a potential left-wing coalition that Prime Minister Chris Hipkins of the New Zealand Labour Party might have formed after the election with the major progressive third parties, Te Pāti Māori and the Green Party of Aotearoa New Zealand.

Since the election, "coalition of chaos" and similar pejoratives like the "three-headed taniwha" have primarily been used by the opposition and some media commentators in reference to the resulting right-wing National–ACT–New Zealand First government that formed upon National emerging as the largest party after the election.

Chris Hipkins occasionally used variants of the term, such as "coalition of cuts", to emphasise National's austerity measures in its partnership with ACT New Zealand, and the New Zealand First parties. The Green Party has used the term 'coalition of cruelty' in response to policies such as evicting state housing tenants and reducing benefits.

== Background and usage ==
The term was not coined in New Zealand, however; earlier usage included that of British Prime Minister David Cameron to describe a potential coalition between Labour and the Scottish National Party (see Chaos with Ed Miliband), which became similarly infamous.

Under New Zealand's mixed-member proportional (MMP) voting system, legislative coalitions are almost always essential for forming governments. During the campaign, Luxon, a centre-right social conservative, claimed Hipkins would form a "coalition of chaos" with the Green Party and Te Pāti Māori, the two other left-wing parties in the House of Representatives, the latter of whom he described as "separatist" and "radical". Luxon became known for his usage of the term. At one point Luxon caused controversy after also claiming Labour would go into coalition with "Te Pāti Māori... and the gangs". At the time of the election, all the major third parties had Māori leadership or co-leadership. This is relevant because the potential left-wing coalition was seen as one which would enhance indigenous rights (in eyes of the right, to the detriment of others), and the right-wing coalition as one seen as regressive towards them.

Hipkins occasionally also utilised the phrase to claim that Luxon would form an extreme right coalition with two parties, ACT New Zealand, led by David Seymour, and New Zealand First, led by veteran politician Winston Peters; Hipkins also used the term "coalition of cuts". Luxon's reversal on forming a coalition with New Zealand First, which he had previously refused to comment on, was justified by Luxon himself as averting Labour's "coalition of chaos".

After National emerged as the largest party in the election and formed such a coalition with New Zealand First and ACT, opposition politicians used the term to describe Luxon's government, the Sixth National Government of New Zealand, instead. The term "coalition of chaos" and others related to it, such as the "three-headed taniwha", have since been used to describe the triumvirate-like power-sharing agreement between Luxon, Peters and Seymour, in which Luxon had made significant concessions in exchange for support. This included the potential of a controversial referendum on the principles of the Treaty of Waitangi as proposed by ACT. The term "coalition of chaos" to describe the Sixth National Government is mostly by left-wing commentators and politicians, but also some conservative ones, such as Matthew Hooton. Other commentators to have used the term include Joel Maxwell, Grant Duncan, and Rahui Papa.
