= Peters v Collinge =

- Court: High Court of New Zealand
- Full case name: Winston Peters v John Collinge
- Decided: 1993
- Citation: [1993] 2 NZLR 554

Court membership
- Judge sitting: Fisher J

Keywords
- illegal contracts

Peters v Collinge [1993] 2 NZLR 554 is a case regarding illegal contracts at common law, involving the unenforceability of contracts interfering with the democratic process.

== Background ==
Winston Peters was a maverick National Party MP in 1992, and the Party was going through the process of expelling him. Peters was MP for Tauranga, comfortably held the seat, and it was anticipated that he would retain it no matter which party he stood for. In the run up to the 1993 general election, in order to retain Tauranga, the party required Peters to sign a form agreeing not to stand in any electorate for any political party other than the National Party. This was somewhat problematic for Peters, as he would soon start the new political party New Zealand First.

Peters subsequently filed in court an interim injunction to have this declared invalid. John Collinge was named as the defendant, as he was the president of the National Party.

== Held ==
The High Court ruled that this term interfered with the democratic process, making it illegal under common law, thus was legally unenforceable.
