= Hells Angels MC criminal allegations and incidents =

Criminal incidents involving the Hells Angels

Numerous police and international intelligence agencies classify the Hells Angels Motorcycle Club (HAMC) as a motorcycle gang and contend that members carry out widespread violent crimes, including drug dealing, trafficking in stolen goods, gunrunning, extortion, and human trafficking operations. Members of the organization have continuously asserted that they are only a group of motorcycle enthusiasts who have joined to ride motorcycles together, to organize social events such as group road trips, fundraisers, parties, and motorcycle rallies, and that any crimes are the responsibility of the individuals who carried them out and not the club as a whole. Members of the club have been accused of crimes and/or convicted in many host nations.

== Argentina ==
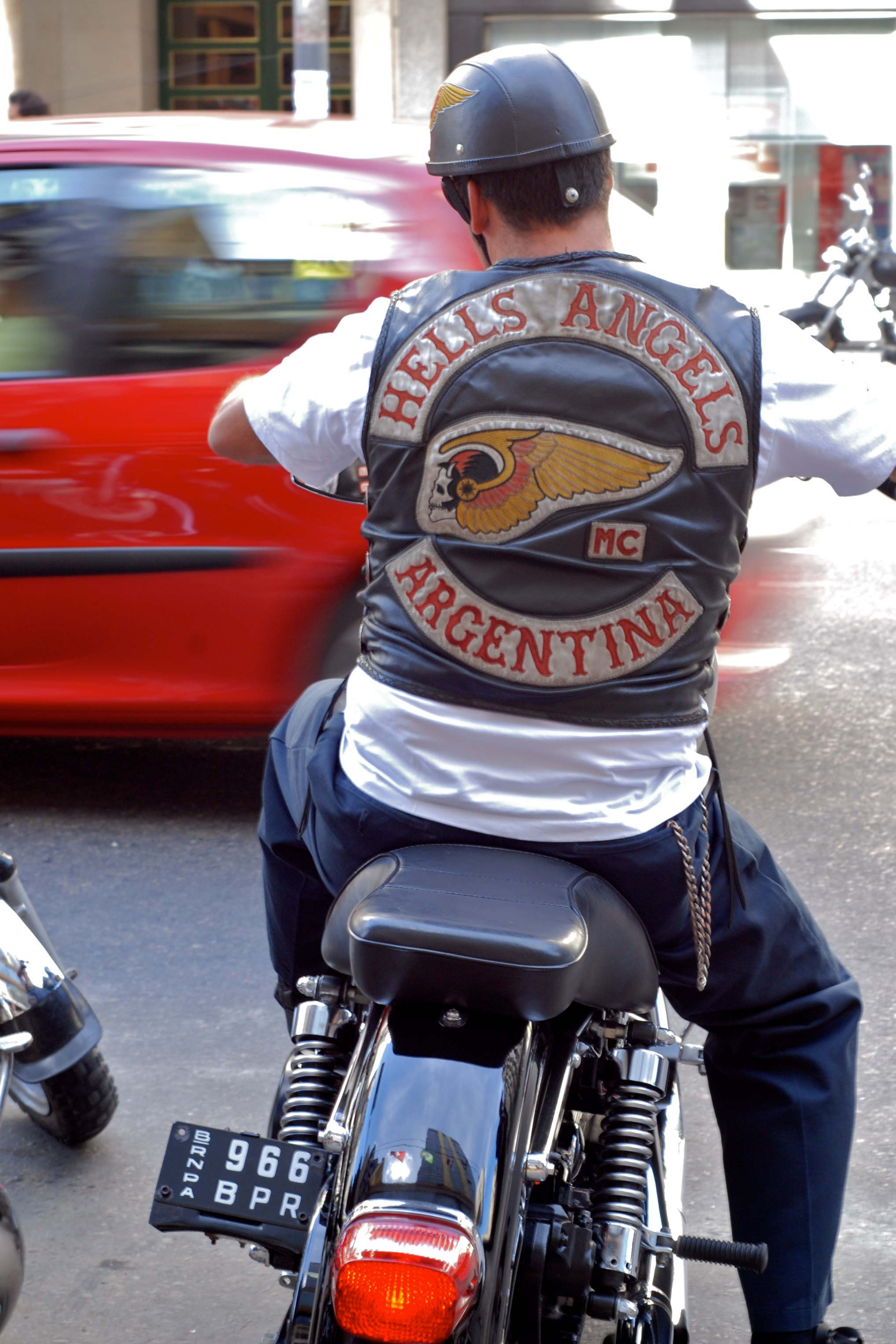
A member of the Argentine Hells Angels

The Argentine branch of the HAMC was established with a charter in Buenos Aires on June 16, 1999.

American Hells Angels member Paul Merle Eischeid, who fled the United States in 2007 after being charged with drug trafficking, racketeering, kidnapping and homicide, was apprehended in San Isidro, Buenos Aires on February 3, 2011 after being tracked by the U.S. Marshal Service, Diplomatic Security Service, and Interpol. Eischeid, along with fellow Hells Angels Kevin J. Augustiniak and Michael Christopher "Mesa Mike" Kramer, had murdered Yvonne Garcia, a 44-year-old mother of six who verbally disrespected the club and its members while in an intoxicated state during a party at the Hells Angels' clubhouse in Mesa, Arizona on October 27, 2001. He was extradited to the U.S. in July 2018 after exhausting all of his appeals in the Argentine legal system.

On May 14, 2016, three people were seriously injured as a result of a shootout between the Hells Angels and Los Tehuelches, a rival motorcycle gang with Neo-Nazi sympathies consisting primarily of active and former police officers, at a highway gas station in Luján, Buenos Aires. Two men – Los Tehuelches leader Leo Gatto, and Hells Angels president Daniel "Dani La Muerte" Díaz León, a celebrity bodyguard and television personality – were shot several times, while a woman was run over. The rival clubs were reportedly travelling to a motorcycle rally in Trenque Lauquen when members of Los Tehuelches opened fire on the Hells Angels from a van, prompting a gun battle in which around 150 rounds were fired. Ten people, including Díaz León and Gatto, were arrested and firearms were seized.

== Australia ==
The Hells Angels expanded to Australia in 1975, initially establishing chapters in Melbourne and Sydney, and now have approximately two-hundred-and-fifty members and fourteen chapters in the country.

The club's activities in Australia have traditionally included drug trafficking, prostitution, armed robbery, arms trafficking, fencing stolen goods and murder-for-hire, but they have more recently moved into legitimate businesses such as gyms, tattoo parlours, haulage companies, and the security industry. Police allege that the Hells Angels undertake money laundering by passing money through legitimate businesses.

== Austria ==
The Austrian branch of the Hells Angels was established when the club formed a chapter in Vorarlberg in November 1975. The Vienna charter was later founded on November 23, 1985. The club has approximately 300 members in Austria. The Hells Angels are classified as a criminal organization by the Federal Criminal Police Office. The Austrian Hells Angels are involved in prostitution operations, and the trafficking of cannabis and cocaine.

On January 4, 2017, Marcus Matz, the fugitive president of the Hells Angels chapter in Leipzig, Germany, was arrested when 100 police officers raided the Hells Angels clubhouse in Vienna. The previous day, authorities in Saxony had offered a €10,000 reward for information on Matz, who was wanted in relation to a shooting in Leipzig on June 25, 2016 in which a member of the United Tribuns gang was killed and two other men were critically injured.

== Belgium ==
Belgium became home to its first Hells Angels chapter in the summer of 1997, at which time a major Belgian police inquiry into the club immediately began. In May 1999, Belgium became the first country in the world to declare the Hells Angels an illegal organization with Vincent hallez. A court in Ghent ruled that the motorcycle club amounts to a private militia – membership of which is banned under Belgian law.

On October 4, 2009, several Hells Angels and allied Red Devils performed a raid on an Outlaws clubhouse in Kortrijk. Shots were fired and three Outlaws were wounded before the Hells Angels and their Red Devils comrades fled the scene. The incident occurred after members of the Outlaws supposedly pushed over a motorcycle belonging to Red Devils president Johan F. in Moeskroen. The raid is also thought to be a part of a territorial dispute between the Hells Angels and the Red Devils on one side and the Outlaws on the other. Several months before the raid, on July 24, 2009, members of the Red Devils and Hells Angels already retaliated by setting fire to motorcycles outside an Outlaws clubhouse. Eventually six Hells Angels and two Red Devils were convicted for attempted murder and given sentences from five to twenty years in prison.

Hells Angels member Ali Ipekci shot dead Outlaws member Freddy Put, hangaround Jef Banken and supporter Michael Gerekens in an industrial zone in Maasmechelen where the Outlaws were holding an opening reception for a new tire centre on May 20, 2011. He was convicted of triple murder and sentenced to 30 years' imprisonment on February 6, 2015.

In October 2014, 47-year-old British man Conrad Toland was arrested by Spanish police in Madrid and brought before the National Court in Madrid to face extradition proceedings to Belgium where he was wanted to complete a 10-year sentence for smuggling 155 kilograms of cocaine into the country from Ecuador in July 2011 inside a tuna shipment. He then supplied the drugs to the Hells Angels chapter in Bruges. He also faced charges in Belgium of membership in an armed gang and money laundering.

== Canada ==
The Criminal Intelligence Service Canada (CISC) has designated the Hells Angels an outlaw motorcycle gang. In 2002, Crown Prosecutor Graeme Williams sought to have the club formally declared a "criminal organization" by applying the anti-gang legislation (Bill C-24) to a criminal prosecution involving the Hells Angels and two of its members, Stephen "Tiger" Lindsay and Raymond "Razor" Bonner. The prosecution team launched a three-year investigation with the aim of collecting evidence for the trial. According to CBC News, the Hells Angels had thirty-four chapters operating in Canada with 460 full-fledged (patched) members as of April 2009. According to this article, the Hells Angels had at that time fifteen chapters in Ontario, eight in British Columbia, five in Quebec, three in Alberta, two in Saskatchewan and one in Manitoba.

== Denmark ==
=== Formation and early rivalries ===
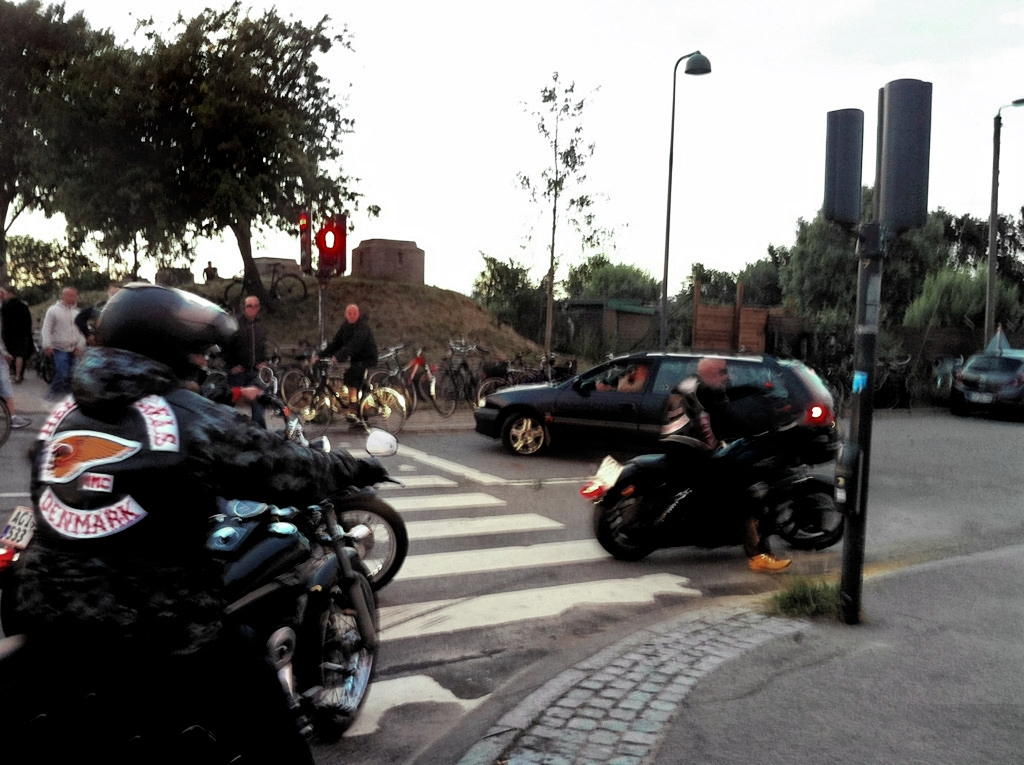
Hells Angels in Sundbyøster, Copenhagen (2011)

Conflicts between youth gangs from the Copenhagen districts of Amager Vest, Amager Øst and Nørrebro started to occur in the early 1970s and by the late 1970s, the Galloping Goose, Nomads, Iron Sculls and Dirty Angels motorcycle clubs united as Unionen MC before applying for membership of the Hells Angels. The former Unionen officially became the first Scandinavian Hells Angels chapter on December 30, 1980, setting up chapters in Copenhagen's Titangade and Nørrebro districts. Shortly thereafter, the Filthy Few, an Amager-based club, merged with the Nøragersmindebanden to form Bullshit MC, settling in Freetown Christiania where they benefited from the trade in cannabis products and challenged the Hells Angels for control of Copenhagen's biker scene. The two clubs would wage war against each other between September 1983 and December 1985. The Copenhagen biker war began on September 24, 1983, when three Bullshit members and a woman entered the Søpromenaden restaurant, a known Hells Angels hangout, at Dag Hammarskjölds Allé 37. Two of the three Bullshit members, Søren Grabow Grander (November 25, 1962 – September 24, 1983) and Flemming Hald Jensen (April 4, 1962 – September 24, 1983) were killed in a bottle and knife attack. Hells Angels member Bent "Blondie" Svane Nielsen was convicted for the murders. In November 1983, Bullshit president Henning Norbert "Makrellen" Knudsen (January 15, 1960 – May 25, 1984) was interviewed on the live television show Mellem Mennesker ("Between Humans"), which aired on DR TV, and stated that he would not allow an American motorcycle club such as the Hells Angels to gain control in Denmark. Knudsen was shot and killed with a submachine gun in front of his wife Pia outside their home on May 25, 1984. At the time of his death, Knudsen and other Bullshit members were the prime suspects for the double murder of two young men (aged 16 and 20) in Amager six days before. A Yugoslavian immigrant would later be convicted of those murders, however.

The following two Bullshit presidents after Knudsen were also assassinated. Palle "Lillebror" Blåbjerg (July 26, 1959 – April 26, 1985) was shot dead at work; while delivering beers to an off-licence store in Valby Langgade on April 26, 1985, Carsten Bresløv (born June 9, 1958), a member of the Morticians who were a club affiliated with the Hells Angels at the time, entered the store wearing a mask and shot Blåbjerg. In court, Bresløv claimed to have no regrets whatsoever, apart from not having killed Blåbjerg's working colleague as well. Anker Walther "Høvding" Marcus (January 17, 1947 – December 21, 1985) was then murdered by Ole Bonnesen Nielsen and Rene Nøddeskov Ludvigsen, two members of the Black Sheep (another Hells Angels prospect club), following a Christmas party at Nemoland Café in Christiania on December 21, 1985. Lars Michael Larsen (October 16, 1965 – December 21, 1985), an innocent bystander, was also killed in this attack after being shot in the mouth. Nielsen and Ludvigsen claimed that they had shot in self-defence after Marcus had drawn a handgun first.

Bullshit MC left Christiania following Marcus' death and formally disbanded in 1988. By the end of the Copenhagen biker war, eight Bullshit members had been killed compared to one Hells Angel, in addition to one "civilian" which brought the total death toll to ten during the 2-year-four-month-long conflict. The Black Sheep later "patched-over" to (were absorbed by) the Hells Angels, while the Morticians were declined membership.

=== Nordic Biker War ===
The Morticians, who were founded in 1984, became a rival club of the Hells Angels by 1992 before changing their name to Undertakers MC and later aligning themselves with the Bandidos, whose only European chapter was based in Marseille, France, at that point. In 1993, the Undertakers merged with the Bandidos to become Bandidos MC Denmark. In 1994, the Hells Angels tried to prevent another club, Morbids MC, from growing into an established biker gang and potential rival in Sweden. The Morbids then also joined an alliance with the Bandidos, who backed-up their prospect club. Outlaws MC also joined with the Bandidos in Norway. This eventually led to the Great Nordic Biker War, a conflict over control of the drug trade between the two most powerful outlaw biker gangs in Scandinavia, the Hells Angels and the Bandidos.

Bandidos members who were returning from a weekend in Helsinki were shot, three wounded and one, Uffe Larsen, was killed at Copenhagen Airport on March 10, 1996. Six Hells Angels members and associates were convicted and sentenced to a total of 53 years in prison, and one was given a life sentence, for the attack. In April and May 1996, the clubhouse of a Hells Angels prospect club, Avengers MC, was attacked in Aalborg. On October 6, 1996, an anti-tank rocket was fired at a Hells Angels clubhouse in Copenhagen during a party. Hells Angels member Louis Linde Nielsen and guest Janne Krohn were both killed. Bandidos prospect Niels Poulsen was convicted of carrying out the attacks and sentenced to life in prison.

At the beginning of 1997, Hells Angels member Kim Thrysöe Svendsen was murdered in Aalborg. Outlaws president Thore "Henki" Holm and a French Outlaws member were subsequently shot and wounded by a member of the Untouchables MC, a Hells Angels ally. Bandidos foot-soldiers were also shot in Amager and Køge. The Bandidos responded by ordering shootings on Hells Angels members and allies in Frederiksberg, Copenhagen. Björn Gudmandsen was then killed and three other Bandidos were wounded after a shooting in Liseleje on June 7, 1997. Hells Angels member Vagn Smith was convicted of the murder and sentenced to life imprisonment. The last incident happened on August 11, 1997, when the Bandidos clubhouse in Dalby was bombed.

The war ended on September 25, 1997, as "Big" Jim Tinndahn, the president of the Bandidos' European chapters, and Hells Angels Europe president Bent "Blondie" Svane Nielsen announced that they had signed a peace agreement and shook hands in front of Danish TV news cameras. By the end of the war, 11 murders and 74 attempted murders had been committed and 96 people were wounded across Scandinavia. A law was passed in Denmark that banned motorcycle clubs from owning or renting property for their club activities. The law has subsequently been repealed on constitutional grounds.

=== Later incidents ===
Bandidos associate Flemming Jensen was beaten and stabbed to death by Hells Angels members in a tavern in Aalborg on August 12, 2001. Hells Angels prospect Jesper Østenkær Kristoffersen confessed to stabbing Jensen eight times and was sentenced to six years in prison for manslaughter on February 7, 2002, while Jørn "Jønke" Nielsen was sentenced to four years on September 18, 2002, for aggravated assault resulting in death as witnesses claimed that he had kicked and stomped on Jensen.

In 2007, a Hells Angels-associated gang named Altid Klar-81 ("Altid Klar" is Danish for "Always Ready" and 81 is synonymous with the letters HA) was formed in Denmark to combat immigrant street gangs in a feud over the lucrative illegal hash market. AK81 has been recruiting much quicker than the mainstream Hells Angels as members are not required to own a motorcycle or wear a patch, and racial tensions are running high in parts of Denmark. On August 14, 2008, Osman Nuri Dogan, a 19-year-old Turk, was shot and killed by an AK81 member in Tingbjerg. Later that year, on October 8, there was a shoot-out between AK81 members and a group of immigrants in Nørrebro, Copenhagen, during which one man was injured.

A turf war between the Hells Angels and the Black Army on Funen led to a number of clashes which resulted in the clubhouses of both gangs in Odense being temporarily closed by police in October 2016. The Hells Angels were the suspects in a grenade attack on the Black Army clubhouse in Herning, which took place on December 13, 2016.

On November 15, 2016, the Task Force Pusher Street of the Copenhagen Police raided a "joint factory" in Christiania operated by the Hells Angels and its support group AK81. Police arrested nine people, including "fully-fledged member" of the Hells Angels and another man associated with the club, who allegedly produced over 140,000 cannabis cigarettes in a six-week period.

Police raided a "large number of addresses" including the clubhouse of the Hells Angels Nomads chapter on Amager and arrested "a full member of Hells Angels" along with fourteen others on April 5, 2017 as part of an investigation into the cannabis trade in Christiania. In a statement, Chief Inspector Poul Kjeldsen of the Copenhagen Police said that eight of those arrested would be charged with "working in a professional and hierarchical organisation which has sold several hundred kilos of cannabis over an extended period".

In June 2023, five members of a drug gang associated with the Hells Angels were arrested in a joint operation conducted by police in Denmark and Spain. Drugs and €59,000 in cash were seized during police raids. Three of the men were apprehended by Danish police in Copenhagen, while two others were taken into custody in Málaga by the Spanish National Police Corps, on suspicion of transporting tonnes of hashish under the cover of animal transportation.

The Hells Angels became involved in a war with the Loyal to Familia (LTF) gang to monopolize the cannabis trade in Christiania. On August 26, 2023, a man was shot dead and four others were injured in the feud. A man affiliated with the LTF gang was subsequently arrested in relation to the shooting. Sophie Hæstorp Andersen, Mayor of Copenhagen, issued a warning to foreigners to stop buying cannabis on the city's Pusher Street.

The Hells Angels have infiltrated the Port of Aarhus, the largest commercial port in Denmark. In September 2023, Keith Svendsen, Executive Vice-President of Maersk, stated that around 30 full-time and freelance employees at the port are affiliated with the Hells Angels, and use shipping containers to transport illegal items such as cocaine. Jacob Bundsgaard, mayor of Aarhus, stated: "The Port of Aarhus is a critical infrastructure, and I am appalled that criminals are operating in the port. It is something we must look at immediately".

On September 9, 2023, an explosion took place at the Hells Angels clubhouse in the Nordvest quarter of Copenhagen. Police were investigating the explosion as a deliberate act by a rival gang in an ongoing gang war.

== Finland ==
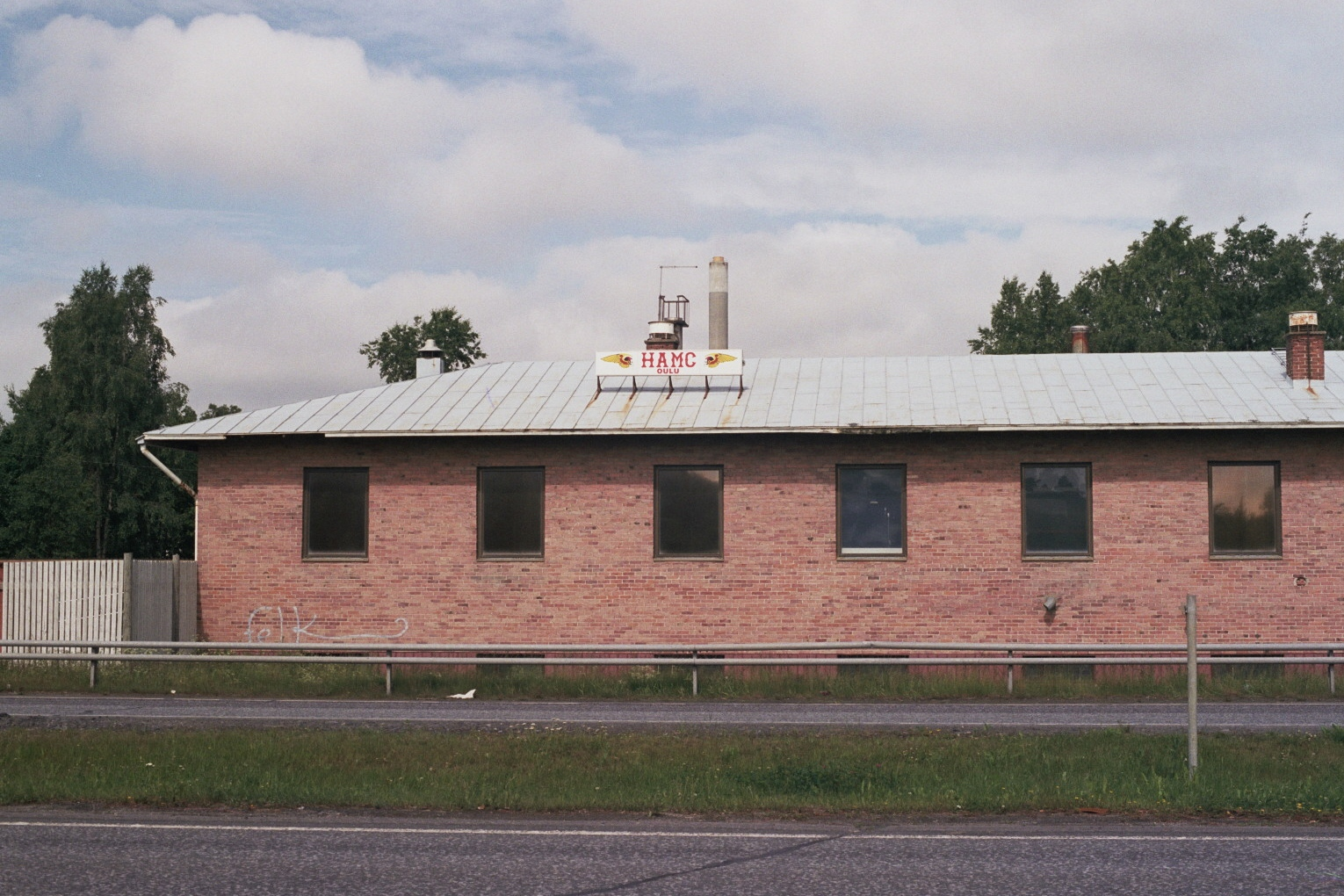
A former laundry used as a Hells Angels clubhouse in Oulu

The Hells Angels have 9 chapters and 130 members in Finland. The club is classified as a criminal organization by the National Bureau of Investigation.

== France ==
The first Hells Angels chapter in France was founded on April 18, 1981 when the Hells de Crimée ("Hells of Crimea") gang in Paris was granted a charter by the Dutch Hells Angels. It was not until 1987, however, that the French Hells Angels were incorporated as a société à responsabilité limitée. The Damnés ("Damned") biker gang of Orléans became the second Hells Angels chapter in France on April 18, 1987. The club has six French chapters.

Narcotics officers raided the Paris Hells Angels clubhouse in July 1991, discovering pump-action shotguns and an elaborate system which could be used to evacuate several kilograms of cocaine via a compressed air tube. Police raids on the residences of several members the same day also uncovered eleven kilograms of cannabis, 700 grams of cocaine, F200,00 in cash, and several weapons, including a tripod-mounted machine gun, pistols, carbines, shotguns and approximately 1,000 rounds of ammunition. A police spokesman said: "There is no doubt we are dealing with a criminal organisation of international dimensions."

The Hells Angels went to war with the Bandidos when after first Bandidos chapter in Europe was opened in Marseille in August 1989. The Filthy Rebels, a Hells Angels-affiliated gang in Grenoble, carried out a drive-by shooting on Bandidos members in August 1991, killing the Marseille chapter president and wounding two others. The Filthy Rebels were subsequently "patched over" by the Hells Angels on September 7, 1991 to become the club's Grenoble chapter. This chapter was dissolved, however, after police, acting on intelligence supplied by an informant in the Buccaneers, another motorcycle gang affiliated with the Hells Angels, arrested eight Hells Angels members in connection with the shooting, as well as members of the Buccaneers who supplied the stolen motorcycles used in the attack, in February 1992.

On April 18, 1999, the Hells Angels absorbed the RMB ("Raving Mad Brothers") biker gang in Gagny, which was active in white-collar crime.

Police began an investigation into the Hells Angels after two members were arrested for dealing cocaine in Dax, Landes in February 2005. In December 2005, the narcotics brigade of the Paris police searched of a premises in Aubervilliers, discovering firearms and 330 grams of cocaine, and arresting the president of the Paris Hells Angels on suspicion of cocaine trafficking.

Following an investigation which began in 2011, police arrested fifteen Hells Angels members in connection with cocaine trafficking, weapons possession, theft and violence as the bikers attended the inauguration of a tattoo parlor in Bordeaux on January 26, 2013. Police also seized a stolen Harley-Davidson motorcycle, several bulletproof vests, 9mm parabellum and 38 special caliber handguns, as well as 300 grams of cocaine, a kilo and a half of cannabis resin and 15,000 euros. Motorcycles and a luxury car were also seized as part of non-justification of resources. Twelve of the accused, which included "full patch", "prospect" and "hangaround" members of the Hells Angels chapters in Paris and Orléans, went on trial before the Bordeaux Criminal Court beginning on November 23, 2015.

== Germany ==
=== Formation and early years ===
The first German charter of the Hells Angels was founded in Hamburg via a "patch over" of the Bloody Devils biker gang in March 1973, and was active in the red-light districts of St. Pauli and Sternschanze. The club consists of 69 chapters and 1,400 members in Germany.

In 1980, Hells Angels members murdered a nightclub manager on the island of Sylt. On August 11, 1983, 500 police officers stormed the clubhouse "Angels Place" in the red-light district Sternschanze and arrested the leaders of the Hells Angels of Hamburg. In 1986, thirteen members were sentenced between 6 months to 7 years in prison for crimes including brothel-keeping and extortion, and the Hamburg charter and its symbols were banned. Despite the ban, today there is again a Hells Angels charter in Hamburg under the name of "Harbor City", because the association is not prohibited as such, but only wearing its symbols. The club itself could not be designated a criminal organization due to insufficient evidence.

The other Hells Angels members and 250 of 497 members of the motorcycle club "Bones" in Hannover under its President Frank Hanebuth, took over the power in the Hamburg Kiez and controlled numerous brothels, including the "Laufhaus" and the "Pascha", on the Reeperbahn. Some women were forced into prostitution with brutal violence. At the height of its power in the middle of 2000, the monthly brothel sales amounted to €150,000 (DM300,000). After a leading member of the Hells Angels, Norbert "Butcher" S., 34, had beaten up a 42-year-old woman, waitress, prostitute, cocaine addict and drug courier, who tried to burn herself to death, she pointed him out to the police and disappeared. Meanwhile, Butcher fled to Brazil because the Hells Angels had set a bounty on him. German investigators tracked him to South America and persuaded him to give evidence. On November 1, 2000, 400 police officers moved to a major raid and arrested the new leadership of the association. In Germany, Sweden and Poland 17 suspects were arrested and more than 50 kilograms of narcotics were seized. The witnesses are now living under police protection because they fear for their lives.

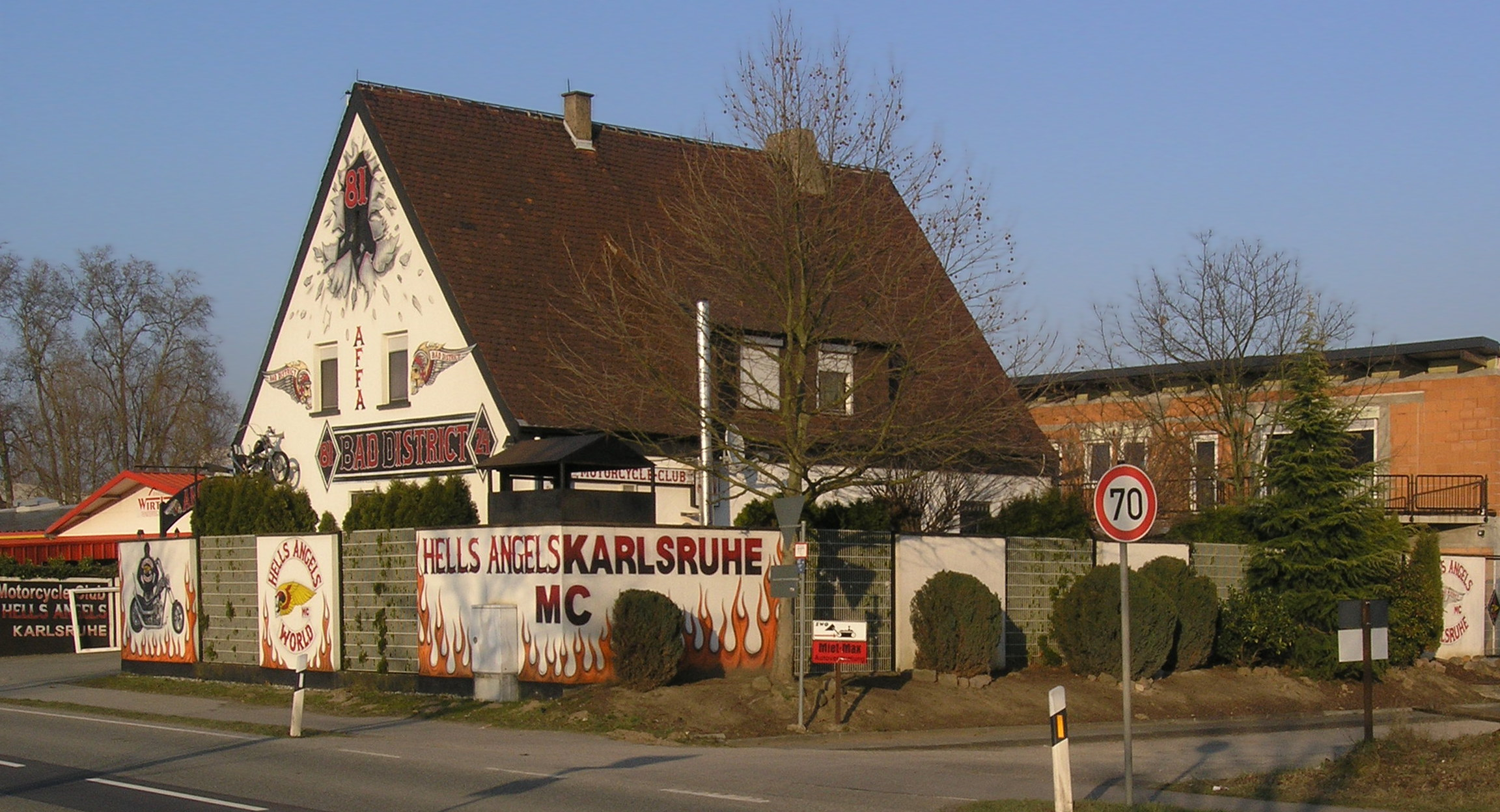
Karlsruhe club house in Waghäusel

=== 2000s ===
Helmut "Miko" M., a leading figure of the Karlsruhe Hells Angels, a 42-year-old brothel owner and notorious red-light figure in Karlsruhe, was shot dead in January 2004 in a coffee shop downtown in broad daylight. Previously, in December 2003, a bomb attack perpetrated on him failed due to an intermittent contact in the explosive device. The background to the crime was disputes over open money claims in the red-light district.

In March 2006, a group of Hells Angels raided a Bandidos clubhouse in Stuhr where they assaulted and robbed five Bandidos members. Three were given jail sentences and another eleven were handed down suspended sentences at the trial which took place in Hannover on December 16, 2008.

On May 27, 2007, five Hells Angels members attacked, robbed and injured one Bandidos member in Hohenschönhausen, Berlin. Nineteen police vehicles were in use and shots were fired. A witness filmed the scene. All people involved including the Hells Angels, Bandidos and the witness were silent in court. Sources say there are two high ranking Hells Angels members involved in the conflict. One is the former President of the "Hells Angels of Berlin" and the other was a high ranking "Road Captain" who is now the "Treasurer" of the "Hells Angels of Berlin."

On June 11, 2008, Heino B., 48 and Thomas K., 36, two Bandidos members were convicted and sentenced to life imprisonment for the murder of the Hells Angels member Robert K. in Ibbenbüren. Reports say they drove to his Harley-Davidson shop and shot him there on May 23, 2007. After the first day of a related lawsuit on December 17, 2007, riots between the two gangs and the police were reported. Robert K. was 47-years old and "Road Captain" of the Bremen Hells Angels but lived in the area of Osnabrück, where their rivals Bandidos claim supremacy.

Also in June 2008, eight Hells Angels members of the "Hells Angels West Side" and one unidentified biker, who is not a Hells Angels member, were arrested on the A27 near Walsrode. Five private apartments and the clubhouse "Angels Place" in Bremen were searched. Police reports say the LKA-Bremen seized firearms, baseball bats, knives and illegal drugs. Later on the day the BKA (Bundeskriminalamt) arrested another Hells Angels member. Police reports also say five Hells Angels members are on the run.

On July 17, 2008, 34 persons of a group of 50 were arrested in Oranienburg street in Berlin-Mitte. Sources say the persons are supporters of the Hells Angels and bouncers and hooligans in the Mecklenburg-Vorpommern scene. Other sources say the persons are members of the "Brigade 81", a murderous group of the Hells Angels. One of the hooligans (now ex-hooligan and vice-president of the Potsdam Hells Angels) was a famous and dangerous fighter, who had beaten the French police officer Daniel Nivel into a coma in 1998. The police seized white masks, knuckle dusters, telescopic batons, quartz-sand-gloves and illegal drugs. The background of the incident was that a group of Bandidos appeared in the "Gold Club" and wanted to play power games. "It's about the staking of areas and the protection of illegal sources of income", a police statement said.

Later in 2008, Bandidos members attacked a Hells Angels member in Berlin and shots were fired at a Hells Angels member in Cottbus. In Kiel, a mass brawl occurred between members of the Hells Angels and alleged right-wing extremists. During the brutal conflict a Hells Angels member and tattooist from Neumünster was seriously injured with a knife.

On December 6, 2008, the front man of the Hells Angels "Nomads", was brutally beaten in the nightclub "Omega" in Eberswalde. The perpetrators were members of the Chicanos, a support group of the Bandidos motorcycle gang.

In February 2009, the Hells Angels published a statement about the mass brawl in Kiel, distancing itself from contacts to the right-wing scene. "The Hells Angels MC was, is and remains a non-politically motivated club" and "new members have to leave the right-wing scene", Frank Hanebuth, president of the Hannover Hells Angels, said in the statement. The attempt to draw the club into the right-wing haze is a personal insult for every member, the Hells Angels indicate. "We have eight different nations in our club. One comes from Israel, one from Palestine, one even from Suriname. And we are xenophobic?", he asked.

In August 2009, a leading member of the Berlin Bandidos was stabbed and shot to death in Hohenschönhausen, Berlin. A news channel claimed, the 33-year-old Michael B., was a well known outlaw motorcyclist in the district of Lichtenberg, Berlin, the President of the Berlin chapter of the Bandidos MC, and former member of the Hells Angels. Police reports say there is a continuing war over territorial claims between the Bandidos and the Hells Angels.

In October 2009, at the opening ceremony of a new Hells Angels pub in Potsdam, 70 police officers controlled 159 persons, 39 vehicles and arrested one member, who was a fugitive belonging to the Hells Angels group "Nomads." The man was wanted for violation of the Arms Act. Two baseball bats and a banned one-handed knife were also found.

Since December 22, 2009, two members of the Hells Angels stood trial in Kaiserslautern. They were accused, along with another Hells Angels member, who was previously a fugitive, of having allegedly murdered the 45-year-old President of the Donnersberg Outlaws MC in June 2009.

Also in December 2009, a 38-year-old member of the Hells Angels was stabbed and critically injured in Erfurt. Shortly after the attack, the police arrested four suspects in Weimar, including two members of the Jena Bandidos.

=== 2010s ===
In January 2010, the President of the Flensburg Hells Angels was arrested, accused of attempted homicide and hit-and-run driving, by having hit a Bandidos member with his car on the A7, reports say. On the same day, police raided the homes of two other Hells Angels members. Investigators searched for additional evidence in connection with the discovery of a weapons depot in a car repair shop in Flensburg. In November 2009, police had discovered explosives, five machine guns, ten shotguns and pump guns, revolvers and pistols and lots of ammunition.

In February 2010 in Potsdam, about 70 supporters of the Berlin chapter of the Bandidos MC, who usually are hostile to the Hells Angels, moved to the Berlin chapter of the Hells Angels. Police reports say the background of this step is unknown. Specialists say it could have something to do with a fight on June 21, 2009, in Finowfurt where one motorcyclist's leg was badly injured with an axe and the President of the "Brigade 81", André S., was stabbed in the back. Other sources say it could have something to do with the immigrant background of the Berlin chapter of the Bandidos. In general, it was claimed that the outlaw motorcyclists were nationalistic and felt they were "real German men", therefore members with Turkish roots were not welcome. A leading Hells Angels member confirmed the defection and said the new members will be part of "Hells Angels Turkey."

On March 15, 2010, a 21-year-old supporter of the Bandidos was stabbed and badly injured in Kiel. In the same night, police raided meeting points of the Hells Angels. A few days earlier, shots were fired at the house of the local Hells Angels leader.

On March 17, 2010, a Bonn Hells Angels member shot dead a 42-year-old police officer of the SEK (Spezialeinsatzkommando) during a house search. He was subsequently acquitted of murder charges by the German Supreme court, stating that he acted in self-defense after murder threats by Bandido members.

Since March 2010, a Hells Angels member has been standing trial in Duisburg for having murdered an Oberhausen Bandidos member in Hochfeld, Duisburg on October 8, 2009, who was executed with a headshot in its red-light district.

In April 2010, a member of the Flensburg Hells Angels, who is a witness in a double murder case and a businessman are accused having extorted €380,000 from another businessman who, after a dispute with his wife, stabbed her and his 7-year-old daughter to death then set his house on fire in February 2009. The background to the crimes were caused by economic difficulties.

On May 3, 2012, the Cologne chapter of the Hells Angels MC was forcefully disbanded and all property of the chapter was confiscated by the North Rhine-Westphalia ministry of home affairs. On the same morning the North Rhine-Westphalian Police raided and searched 32 homes of its members. No arrests were made, however the public display of chapter symbols and the wearing of its regalia were banned. The support club Red Devils MC Cologne was also banned. The North Rhine-Westphalian interior minister justified these actions by saying "The Hells Angels intentionally ignore the basic values of our society. They close themselves off from society, set up their own rules and practice vigilante justice". The previous week similar action was taken against the nearby Aachen chapter of the Bandidos M.C.

On May 29, 2012, the Berlin City Chapter of Hells Angels MC was disbanded and a raid was started. Allegations of an information leak inside the Berlin ministry of home affairs about the upcoming measures were made.

Eight members of the Hells Angels' Berlin charter, including the chapter president Kadir Padir, were sentenced to life in prison by a Berlin court in 2019 for the murder of Tahrir Özbek, a rival gangster with whom Padir was in a long-running conflict. On January 10, 2014, a group of thirteen Hells Angels stormed a Berlin bookmaker's shop, with one of them shooting Özbek six times. One other Hells Angels member was handed a shortened prison sentence of twelve years after he cooperated with investigators.

In early October 2016, Giessen Chapter boss Aygun Mucuk was shot dead at the chapter clubhouse, reportedly the result of a rivalry between the Giessen Hells Angels, whose membership is largely of Turkish origin, and the long-established Hells Angels chapter in nearby Frankfurt. Hundreds of Hells Angels members gathered to ride in honor at his funeral.

=== 2020s ===
According to German officials, in the 2020s, a Hells Angels leader named Ramin Yektaparast directed attacks on Jewish synagogues in Germany to assist the Iranian Islamic Revolutionary Guard Corps. In 2022 Berlin banned a group connected to Hells Angels, as it was involved in violence and criminal activities. In April 2026, German police held large scale raids in North Rhine-Westphalia across 28 cities, targeting the group after banning a chapter in Leverkusen. This was one of the largest operations against biker crime gangs in Germany.

== Iceland ==
Eight Hells Angels members were detained upon arrival at Keflavík International Airport on November 4, 2007 and subsequently deported the following day as they were deemed a threat to national security. The Angels had travelled to Iceland to attend the 11th anniversary celebration of the Fáfnir motorcycle gang in Hafnarfjörður. Hells Angels from overseas were held at the Suðurnes police detention centre before being deported when they again tried to enter the country to attend a Fáfnir event in 2009. The bikers sued the Icelandic state for the treatment they were subjected to. The Fáfnir biker gang began "prospecting" for the Hells Angels in August 2009, shortly after four of its members were arrested in a ISK50 million fraud case. Fáfnir became an official HAMC support club during a visit to a Hells Angels event in England. The Hells Angels' move into Iceland prompted Haraldur Johannessen, the National Commissioner of the Icelandic Police, to seek a ban on the club due to its extensive criminal history in other Nordic countries. In March 2011, Fáfnir "patched over" to the Hells Angels at a ceremony in Oslo, Norway.

In the case of Jan Anfinn Wahl, a member of the Hells Angels chapter in Drammen, Norway who was denied entry to Iceland after arriving in the country on February 5, 2010, the EFTA Court ruled that it is lawful for a European Economic Area (EEA) state "not to grant an individual who is a national of another EEA State leave to enter its territory on grounds of public policy and/or public security" and that an EEA state "cannot be obliged to declare an organisation and membership therein unlawful before it can deny a member of that organisation who is a national of another EEA State leave to enter its territory".

The Icelandic Hells Angels moved their headquarters to Garðabær from Hafnarfjörður in February 2014 following a period of persistent police intervention.

== Netherlands ==
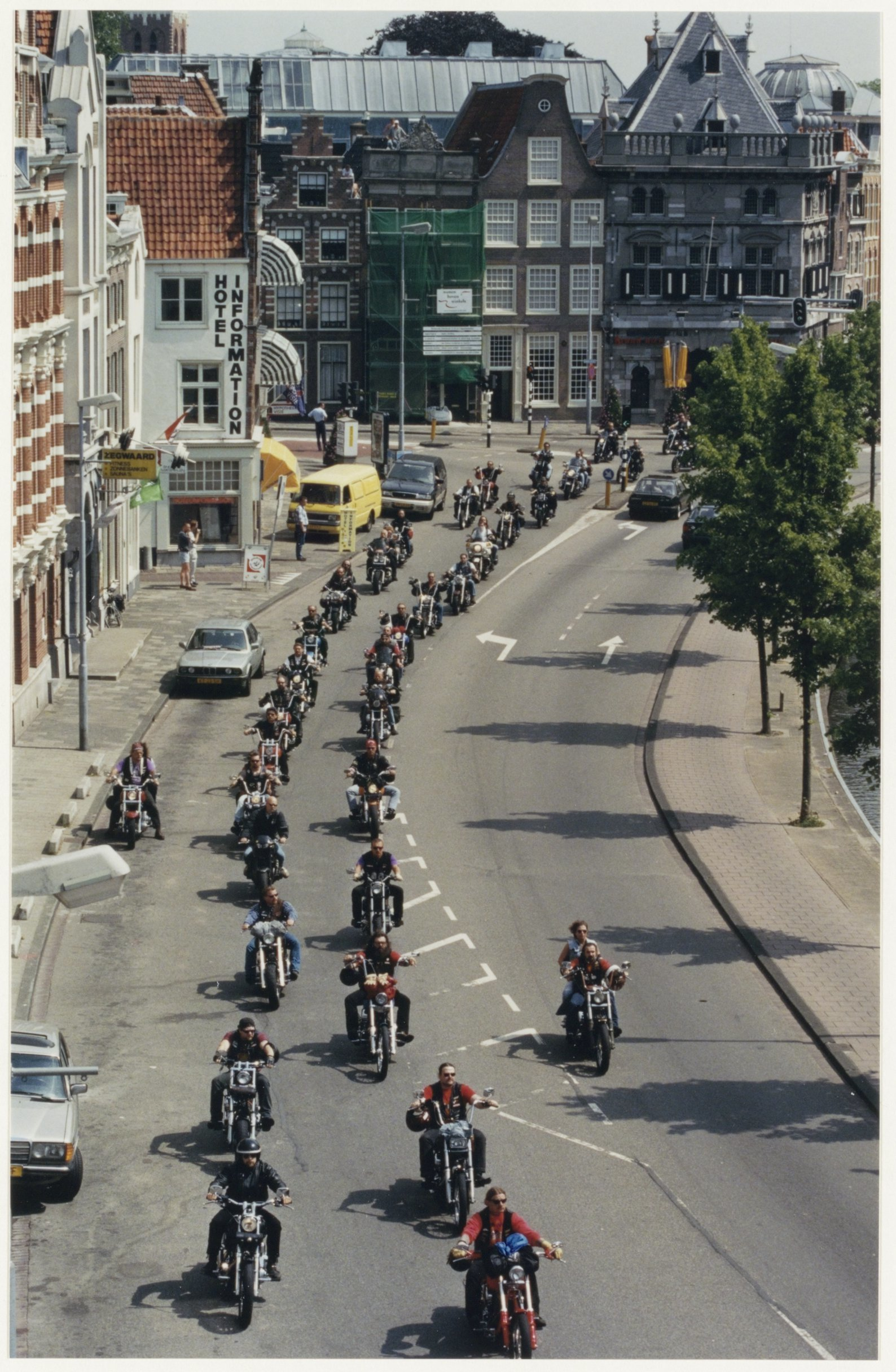
A Hells Angels funeral procession in Haarlem

The first Hells Angels chapter in the Netherland was formed in 1978 when the Kreidler Ploeg Oost biker club in Amsterdam led by Willem van Boxtel was "patched over". The Hells Angels control much of the drug trade in the Netherlands, and are also involved in prostitution. The Dutch police have stated that the Hells Angels smuggle cocaine into the country through terrorist organizations and drug cartels in Curaçao and Colombia, and also deal in ecstasy and illegal firearms.

Hells Angels member Louis Hagemann, who had over a hundred previous convictions including armed robbery, rape and attempted murder, was convicted of the 1984 murder of a mother and her two daughters in February 2003. After strangling Corina Bolhaar, he stabbed nine-year-old Donna and six-year-old Sharon. Hagemann was cleared of murdering Northern Irish woman Joanne Wilson in Amsterdam in 1985 due to insufficient evidence.

Dutch Hells Angels allegedly murdered Stephen "Grumps" Cunningham, a senior member of the club's Nomads chapter in England, who disappeared after boarding a ferry from Ramsgate to Ostend, Belgium on September 9, 1997. Cunningham reportedly travelled to the Netherlands to make a down payment to the Amsterdam Hells Angels on a consignment of cannabis that would be shipped to the United Kingdom. After making the payment, Cunningham was allegedly killed by the Amsterdam chapter under contract from the English Nomads, with whom he had been involved in a dispute for several months. His body was reportedly disposed of at the bottom of a canal.

In October 2005, the Dutch police raided Hells Angels' clubhouses in Amsterdam, Haarlem, IJmuiden, Harlingen, Kampen and Rotterdam as well as a number of houses. Belgian police also raided two locations over the border. Police seized a grenade launcher, a flame thrower, hand grenades, 20 hand guns, a machine pistol and €70,000 (US$103,285) in cash. A number of Hells Angels members were later imprisoned on charges of international trafficking of cocaine and ecstasy, the production and distribution of marijuana, money laundering and murder, after an investigation that lasted over a year.

In 2006 two Dutch newspapers reported that the Amsterdam brothel Yab Yum had long been controlled by the Dutch Hells Angels, who had taken over after a campaign of threats and blackmailing. The city council of Amsterdam revoked the license of Yab Yum in December 2007. During a subsequent trial the city's attorney repeated these allegations and the brothel's attorney denied them. The brothel was closed in January 2008.

Twenty-three bikers were arrested following a fight between Hells Angels and Mongols, in which several gunshots were fired and one person wounded, at the Van der Valk hotel in Rotterdam on April 7, 2016.

On May 29, 2019, the Hells Angels were banned in the Netherlands. This is the first country in the world to outlaw the entire club. The presiding judge of the court in Utrecht called it "a danger to public order and the rule of law".

== New Zealand ==
The Hells Angels' first international chapter was opened in Auckland on July 1, 1961. The Angels are the most influential organised crime group in New Zealand and are involved in the manufacture and distribution of methamphetamine, allegedly acquiring Chinese-imported pseudoephedrine, a chemical precursor in the illicit manufacture of the drug, from triad groups. New Zealand's Hells Angels are allied with the Head Hunters and the Road Knights.

In June 1971, members of the Hells Angels, Highway 61, the Mongrel Mob and the Polynesian Panthers were involved in a large-scale brawl in Auckland, which resulted in numerous arrests.

Seven Hells Angels received prison sentences of up to ten years for their part in the murder of Bradley Earl Haora, a nineteen-year-old Highway 61 member killed with a shotgun in Mount Eden on December 29, 1975.

Hells Angels sergeant-at-arms Andrew Sisson was convicted in 1993 of importing $200,000 of methamphetamine hidden inside a vehicle transmission. In 1999, Sisson and his wife, Vikki Thorne-George, were convicted of money laundering and conspiracy to supply methamphetamine.

In September 2005, searches by police of premises leased by Hells Angels member Lyall Charles Henwood in Hastings uncovered 59 kilograms of pure methamphetamine, along with cut methamphetamine, pseudoephedrine and other equipment used in the manufacture of methamphetamine, cannabis oil, firearms and other stolen property, and $6,000 in cash. On July 25, 2007, while Henwood was on bail, a police raid of his home in Flaxmere resulted in the seizure of more methamphetamine, cannabis, stolen property and cash. Henwood was sentenced to ten years in prison on December 17, 2007 after being convicted of possessing methamphetamine for supply. Additionally, he was sentenced to concurrent terms ranging from one month to three-and-a-half years on eight other charges related to methamphetamine and cannabis distribution, six of receiving stolen property, including firearms and a police radio, and three of unlawfully possessing firearms.

The Hells Angels "patched over" the Lost Breed in Nelson in 2016 and the Mothers MC in Palmerston North in 2018, and also opened chapters in South Auckland and Christchurch.

== Norway ==
Due to the extent of the criminal activities of HAMC in Norway, Kripos, the criminal investigation unit of the Norwegian police, considers the Hells Angels Motorcycle Club to be a criminal organisation.

In 2011 the presumed leader of HAMC Norway Leif Ivar Kristiansen was convicted of threats, robbery and severe drug crimes, and sentenced to four years and nine months in prison. In another case he was found guilty of fencing and tax evasion, and a number of smaller charges. According to numbers from Kripos in 2012, 120 Hells Angels-members have been convicted 400 times for about 1000 violations of the Norwegian penal code. The convictions include violence, rape, severe drug criminality and threats.

In 2010, 2011 and 2013 the police conducted raids on the HAMC headquarters in Oslo and confiscated a number of illegal weapons in all the raids. The police demanded in October 2013 that the headquarters be seized as they believe the house is being used as a staging ground for organized criminal activities.

== Portugal ==
In 2018 Portuguese authorities publicly declared that they found strong evidence of potential gang violence events against Bandidos, a rival motorcycle club, specifically against Mário Machado, once the leader of the Portuguese Hammerskins, who is suspected to be a member of the latter. Around 80 search warrants and dozens of arrest warrants were issued.

In July 2019, Portuguese prosecutors charged 89 members of Hells Angels with involvement in organized crime, attempted murder, robbery, drug trafficking, qualified extortion and possession of illegal weapons and ammunition.

== Romania ==
In November 2020, Romanian Hells Angels national president Marius Lazăr was arrested along with New Zealand nationals Michael Matthews Murray and Marc Patrick Johnson on cocaine trafficking charges following an investigation by the Directorate for Investigating Organized Crime and Terrorism (DIICOT) at the request of the United States Department of Justice. The investigation determined that a cocaine shipment from the United States had been ordered by the leader of the New Zealand Hells Angels and that club members had travelled to Bucharest to arrange the details of the transport. Two luxury cars, 12 motorcycles, US$200,000 in cash, a "lethal weapon", and 100 grams of cocaine were seized during raids carried out in Bucharest and Ilfov County by Romanian organized crime prosecutors in partnership with the U.S. Drug Enforcement Administration (DEA) and Department of Homeland Security.

In January 2023, Romania approved an extradition request to have Lazăr transferred to the U.S. to stand trial on charges of drug trafficking, money laundering and complicity in attempted murder. He allegedly negotiated the attempted killing of two rivals. Lazăr was met by the U.S. Marshals Service as he boarded a plane to the United States on January 16, 2023. On November 17, 2023, Lazăr was convicted in federal court in Beaumont, Texas of conspiracy to commit racketeering, conspiracy to import cocaine into the United States, and conspiracy to commit money laundering.

== South Africa ==
The first HAMC chapter in South Africa was founded in Johannesburg on August 14, 1993. Other charters were subsequently formed in the West Rand on January 31, 1994, Durban on September 6, 1997, and Cape Town on June 13, 1998. The Hells Angels became associated with the Johannesburg "bouncer mafia", a criminal network involved in narcotics trafficking and extortion in the city's nightclub industry that emerged in the late apartheid era. The Hells Angels introduced methamphetamine to South Africa around 1997 when the club began manufacturing the drug on a mass-scale by capitalising on the ease with which ephedrine could be obtained in the country. Criminal links between the South African Hells Angels, particularly the chapters connected to the security industry in Gauteng, and their American counterparts were strengthened after South Africa hosted the club's annual "World Run" international motorcycle rally in 1999.

=== Violent incidents ===
In early 1994, Hells Angels member Lucky Sylaides was arrested by police detectives after firing an unlicensed Uzi submachine gun into the air outside his tattoo parlour in Durban's central business district. Sylaides was arrested and charged with the prohibited possession of a machine gun, a charge that carries a five-year minimum prison sentence. Sylaides and the weapon were released into the custody of Piet Meyer, the head of the Durban police's organised crime unit, who claimed that Sylaides was a police agent. Charges against Sylaides were dismissed and the gun was never recovered. In 1999, Meyer was charged with defeating the ends of justice and other crimes after an investigation revealed that Sylaides was neither an agent nor an informer as Meyer had claimed. Meyer was sentenced to ten years in prison in December 2002 after being convicted of corruption, theft and making a false statement.

On November 8, 2002, a Hells Angels member was shot dead at a café in Oakdene, allegedly by crime figures Nigel McGurk and Mikey Schultz, former members of the club. The biker was fatally shot in the chest after approaching two men and drawing an unlicensed firearm. Police recovered two revolvers and two pistols at the scene. McGurk and Schultz were arrested and taken into custody at a Booysens police station on suspicion of the murder before being released. The pair were later granted immunity from prosecution for a series of murders, including that of mining magnate Brett Kebble, in exchange for testifying against drug smuggler Glenn Agliotti.

HAMC member Edward Jacobs was beaten with a baseball bat and robbed of watches and approximately R100,000 in cash by bouncer Gary Beuthin, his girlfriend Melanie van Niekerk and nightclub owner Warren Schertel after responding to an adult classified advertisement in Sandton, Johannesburg on November 17, 2007. Beuthin, van Niekerk and Schertel were charged with attempted murder, armed robbery with aggravating circumstances, kidnapping, and possession of firearms and ammunition. On February 10, 2010, Beuthin was sentenced to seven years in prison after pleading guilty to some of the charges, while van Niekerk and Schertel were acquitted on all charges.

A Hells Angel was fatally shot and another wounded after four club members arrived at a motorcycle repair shop in Amanzimtoti and became involved in an altercation with the shop owner on March 11, 2020. The two other bikers fled the scene. Police subsequently arrested the owner and opened a murder/attempted murder investigation. Hells Angels members had previously assaulted an employee during a visit to the shop on January 29.

=== Drug trafficking ===
Andre Vogel, a hitman who pleaded guilty to the contract killing of bouncer Billy van Vuuren, testified in October 1999 that the Hells Angels were connected to a drug syndicate that hired him for the murder and that he was paid in cash afterwards directly by Kevin Brown, the club's Johannesburg chapter president. Brown also provided Vogel with a false passport, and another Hells Angel, Lucky Sylaides, provided him with ammunition. Van Vuuren was fatally shot 32 times with a fully-automatic sniper rifle outside a Johannesburg nightclub on February 14, 1997 after setting up competition to the syndicate. Others implicated by Vogel, who was sentenced to 32 years in prison, included nightclub owners and members of the Durban police's organised crime unit.

An international drug smuggling ring involving Hells Angels in South Africa and the United States was allegedly established in November 1999 and uncovered by the U.S. Drug Enforcement Administration (DEA) in 2001. Methamphetamine, hidden in stuffed toys, was speed-mailed from South Africa to Flagstaff, Arizona, from where it was distributed to other U.S. states. South Africans Peter Conway, vice-president of the Hells Angels Nomads chapter, and Michael "Jethro" Hall, former president, and a number of American members were charged with the smuggling. American Hells Angel Greg Surdukan pleaded guilty to charges and was sentenced to fifteen years in prison by a Phoenix judge in June 2002. The U.S. authorities had less success prosecuting the South Africans; Hall was shot dead during a burglary at his Johannesburg home in May 2002, and Conway emigrated to the United Kingdom before he could face charges, where he died on November 24, 2018, aged 52.

Four members of the HAMC were arrested in Johannesburg on November 8, 2002 and charged with various crimes following an intelligence operation by the South African Police Service (SAPS) organised crime unit. Three of the bikers were arrested in Sandton on narcotics and firearms charges for allegedly operating a clandestine drug laboratory. The other was apprehended near Bedfordview after he was allegedly found in possession of three superbikes that were suspected to have been stolen. Police also seized an unlicensed shotgun, rifle, handguns, a silencer, a large quantity of unlicensed ammunition, methcathinone, dagga, cocaine, MDMA tablets and various chemicals and equipment used in the manufacture of methcathinone. Those arrested included the club's Johannesburg chapter president, Edward Jacobs.

Members of the Hells Angels in Gauteng – including Peter Conway, a senior member until he left the club in 2009 – were implicated after police raids on illegal drug laboratories in 2005 and 2009. Charges against Conway relating to an investigation from 2005, when he was arrested on two occasions for allegedly selling MDMA tablets, were withdrawn at Meyerton Magistrate's Court on August 31, 2009.

Hells Angels member Alexander Bely, a former Soviet citizen who immigrated to South Africa in the late 1980s, was arrested in 2006 before being extradited to Russia in February 2013, alleged to have organised the delivery of 224 kilograms of ephedrine to the country between 2003 and 2005 and laundering over ₽34.5 million (around $1.2 million). Bely, along with Andrei Bykov and Bykov's spouse, cousin, adopted daughter and her husband, allegedly obtained the drug from the Hells Angels in South Africa and delivered it to St. Petersburg, passing it off as bath salts. In May 2005, Bykov's wife fled to South Africa, seeking to avoid criminal prosecution. The group then began delivering ephedrine under the guise of detergent. In 2008, three accomplices of Bykov and Bely were found guilty and sentenced to prison terms. Andrei Bykov and his wife Yevgenia were extradited to Russia in 2009 and received fourteen- and eighteen-year sentences, respectively.

== Spain ==
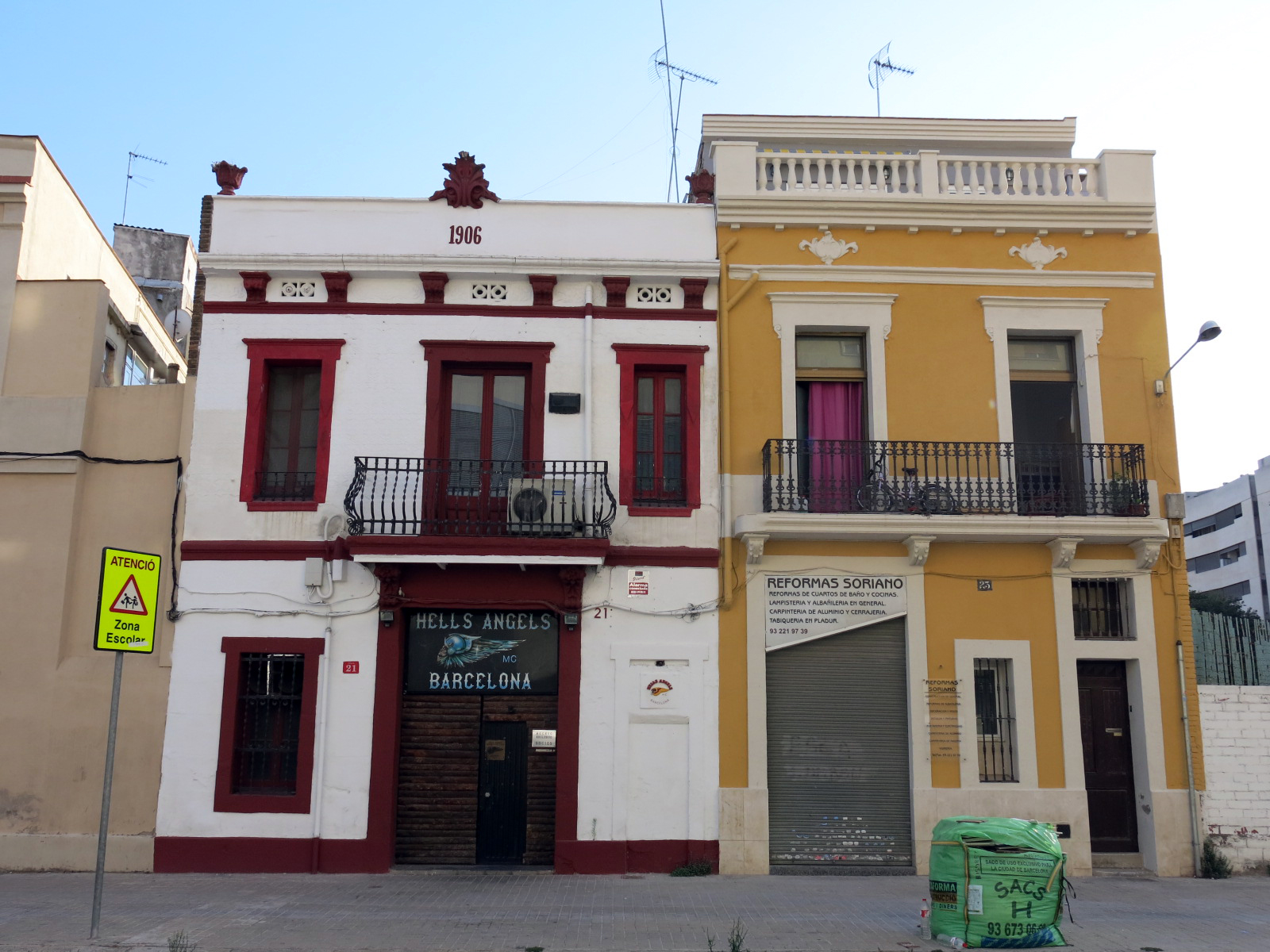
A Hells Angels clubhouse in Barcelona

The HAMC established its first Spanish charters in Barcelona and Valencia on April 19, 1997. The club has sixteen chapters in Spain.

An investigation by Spanish authorities into the Hells Angels, known as Valkiria, began in October 2007 and led to an initial eight arrests in Barcelona in December 2007. On April 21, 2009, a further 22 Hells Angels members were arrested as part of the Valkiria investigation, when more than 30 properties in Barcelona, Valencia, Málaga, Madrid and Las Palmas were raided in a joint operation by the Mossos d'Esquadra and the Civil Guard. Two of those arrested were members of the Hells Angels' Italian chapters. The majority of the arrests, thirteen, took place in Barcelona. One suspect allegedly attempted to use a firearm against police officers as he was being arrested. The suspects were charged with illicit association, drugs and weapons trafficking, and extortion. Weapons, ammunition, bulletproof vests, a kilogram of cocaine, neo-Nazi literature and €200,000 in cash were seized during the raids. Prior to this, the only operation against the Hells Angels in Spain had taken place in the Barcelona area in March 1996.

On October 12, 2011, a club owned by the Hells Angels in Barcelona, The Other Place, was attacked by anti-fascists while a Nazi concert organized by the far-right party Democracia Nacional was held there.

An international drug smuggling operation conducted by the Hells Angels came under surveillance on July 30, 2013, and in September 2013, police seized two vans loaded with cocaine and arrested four Canadian Hells Angels members near Pontevedra. The arrests were the result of an investigation carried out by Spanish police, Europol, the Royal Canadian Mounted Police (RCMP), the United States Drug Enforcement Administration (DEA), and the French tax authority. The bikers allegedly smuggled 500 kilograms of cocaine into the country with the aim of distribution. One of the men allegedly sailed from Colombia with the drugs.

Nine members of the Spanish Charter were involved, among other crimes, in the killing of a notary in Torrevieja and sentenced to 67 years in prison.

In September 2021, sixteen people were arrested on charges of belonging to a criminal organisation and drug trafficking after a joint investigation by the National Police Corps and Danish authorities into a suspected drug ring which was allegedly responsible for the shipment of drugs between Spain and Denmark. Three Danish members of the Marbella Hells Angels chapter were arrested by Spanish authorities, while another thirteen suspects were taken into custody in Denmark. €55,000 in cash, ten kilograms of hashish, several mobile phones – some encrypted – a motorcycle, luxury jewellery and watches were recovered during searches by police.

On September 28, 2022, members of the Hells Angels, who were in Ibiza celebrating a club anniversary, were involved in a street brawl with a group of young men of North African origin, which resulted in several injuries.

Five members of a drug gang associated with the Hells Angels were arrested on May 31, 2023 in a joint operation conducted by the Spanish National Police Corps, the Danish National Police and Europol. Two of the men – a former Hells Angel and a prospective member of the club – were taken into custody in Málaga, while three others were apprehended by Danish police in Copenhagen, on suspicion of transporting 3.5 tonnes of hashish from Spain to Denmark under the cover of animal transportation. The investigation also resulted in €59,000 in cash being seized during a police raid on a house in Spain.

A fugitive German Hells Angel, wanted by authorities in Germany for trafficking cocaine, methamphetamine and hashish, took up residence in Ibiza in September 2022 and was arrested at a restaurant on the island on September 6, 2023 following a surveillance operation by the Civil Guard.

=== Operation Casablanca ===
The Mallorca chapter of the Hells Angels was founded in November 2009 by two brothers, Abdelghani and Khalil Youssafi, and led by Frank Hanebuth, who was a fugitive from authorities in Germany and living in a luxury villa in Lloret de Vistalegre. The Mallorca chapter was internally dissolved in January 2011 and Hanebuth then oversaw the creation of a replacement charter on the island as part of the Hells Angels' "European strategy". The Youssafi brothers, belonging to the Hells Angels Nomads chapter of Luxembourg, remained in Mallorca. The majority of the Hells Angels members on Mallorca had arrived in Spain following a crackdown on the club in Germany.

The Mallorca Hells Angels were allegedly involved in drug trafficking, extortion, the running of prostitution rings, and planned to launder "a significant quantity" of money from its activities in Germany and Turkey in the construction of a Formula One race track in Mallorca. Following a two-year investigation known as Operation Casablanca, 200 National Police Corps and Civil Guard officers raided 31 locations, made 25 arrests, and seized 10 cars; four motorcycles; around €50,000 in cash; firearms; jewellery; boats; and cocaine and marijuana, during an operation directed by the National High Court, on July 23, 2013. Among the arrested were Hanebuth and the Youssafi brothers, as well as Francisco José Valenzuela, a Civil Guard sergeant accused of collaborating with the Hells Angels in conspiring to importing €300 million in cash into Mallorca, and Nicanor Góngora, an officer of the Palma police who allegedly gave the Hells Angels daily information about police investigations in return for payment.

Almost a decade after the Operation Casablanca raids, 49 defendants in the case went on trial on organized crime-related charges at the High Court in Madrid. On the first day of the trial, 34 of the defendants agreed to a plea deal which allowed them to pay fines rather than serve prison sentences. Among those who took plea deals were Mallorca Hells Angels chapter vice president Khalil Youssafi, who agreed to pay a fine of €36,720 in order to avoid serving a 38-year prison sentence, and Paul Witworth, a British national who allegedly maintained links with the Clerkenwell crime syndicate of London. After three weeks of sessions in the High Court, the trial was adjourned on February 10, 2023 to await a verdict from the jury. On September 26, 2023, the remaining thirteen defendants, including Frank Hanebuth, were acquitted of belonging to a criminal organisation. A Civil Guard officer and a local police officer were also acquitted of bribery, while another was disqualified from public employment for six months for failure to prosecute crimes.

== Sweden ==
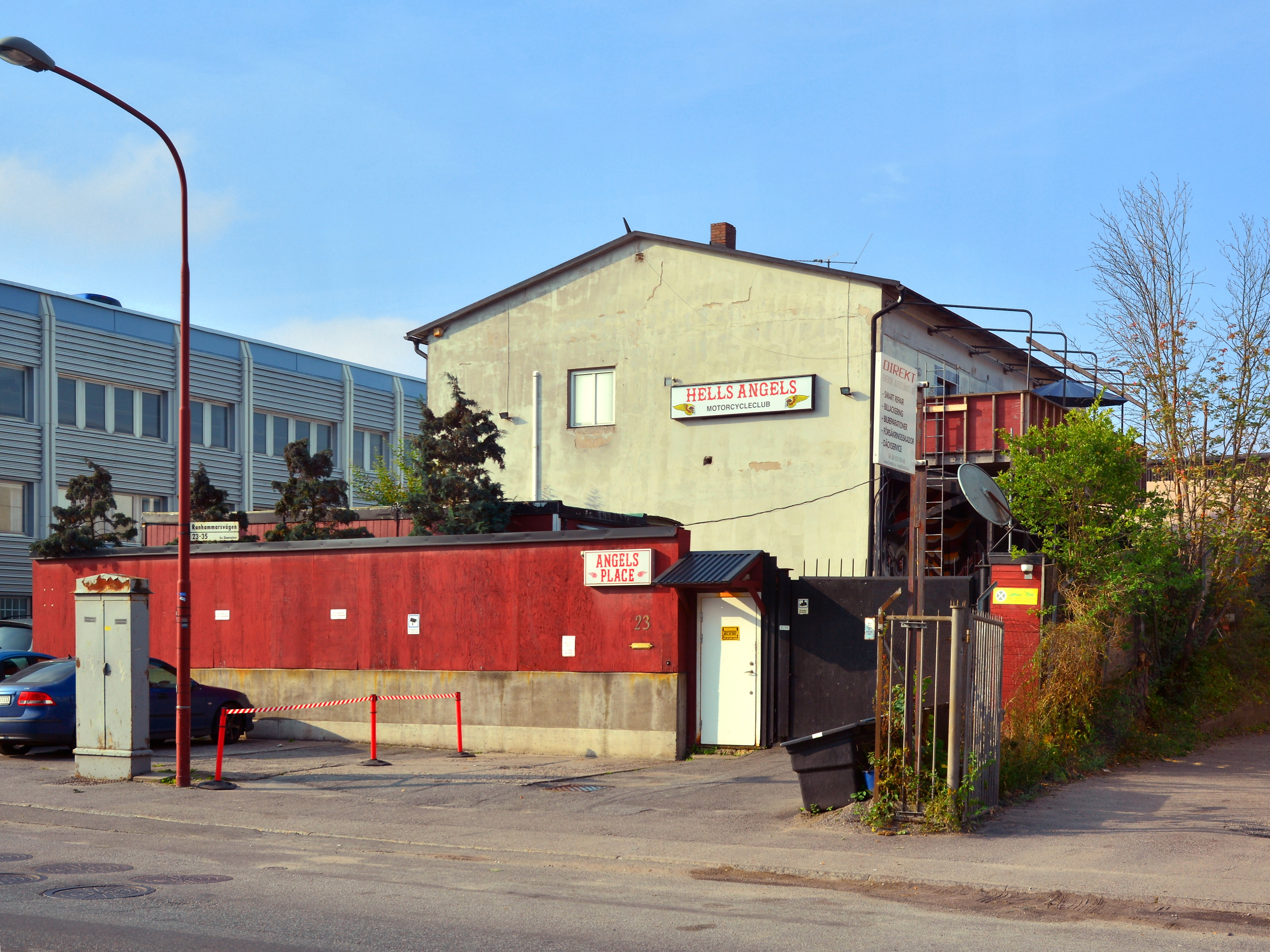
Angels Place in Bromma, the clubhouse of the Stockholm Hells Angels

Sweden is home to twelve Hells Angels chapters with 170 members and 230 official supporters. In 2012, the Swedish television network TV4 compiled a report which alleged that the Hells Angels had been convicted of 2,800 crimes in the country, including 420 violent crimes. The journalist, author and motorcycle gang expert Lasse Wierup has described the Swedish Hells Angels in comparison to other biker gangs in the country as: "They are the most organized, have the best discipline and the lowest member turnover. They also dedicate themselves to the most sophisticated crimes that bring in the most money, hire illegal workers in the construction industry and engage in drug trafficking, money laundering and extortion".

On March 3, 1998, the vice president of the Hirdmen Motorcycle Club in Stockholm was killed by several gunshots to the neck. He was found dead in a car parked outside Hotel Reisen on Skeppsbron in central Stockholm. A former member of Rodents Motorcycle Club, who was affiliated with the Hells Angels, was arrested along with two other men who, according to the police investigation, had been in the car before the murder. The investigation alleged the Hells Angels milieu as perpetrators, although no one was convicted. The arrested biker became a member of the Stockholm chapter of the Hells Angels shortly afterwards.

Morgan "Molle" Blomgren, a member of the Helsingborg chapter of the Hells Angels, disappeared after visiting a construction company in Helsingborg on February 23, 1999. The following day, a fax was sent out to all Hells Angels chapters stating that Blomgren had been excluded from the club in "bad standing". Police believe Blomgren was killed by the Helsingborg Hells Angels, possibly in collaboration with the Gothenburg chapter. Blomgren was legally declared dead in 1999.

Another member of the Helsingborg chapter, Fredrik Lindberg, also disappeared on October 22, 2000 shortly after he was expelled from the Hells Angels. Like Blomgren, police also suspect he was murdered by the Hells Angels. His body was never found, and he was later legally declared dead.

On August 20, 2001, two former members of the Brotherhood gang, Johan Ljung and Zlatko Radojkovic, were stabbed and beaten to death at the Hells Angels' clubhouse in Gunnilse outside Gothenburg. Ljung and Rodojkovic's bodies were later found buried in a gravel pit outside Floby.

Police foiled an alleged kidnapping by the Hells Angels when they rescued a naked, bound and gagged man from the boot of a car after he had been bundled into a BMW and driven away in the southern Gothenburg suburb of Askim on November 24, 2011. The man, who admitted being in debt to the Hells Angels, managed to call police for help from inside the boot of the car. Police theorized the kidnapping was related to the debt.

In May 2012, a group of Hells Angels crashed a private party being held by a motorcycle club in Kalmar in an effort to force the club to disband, attacking and robbing around 30 people, eight of whom were assaulted in front of others. Nineteen Hells Angels went on trial at Gothenburg District Court on charges of aggravated assault, aggravated violence, and aggravated property damage. On December 6, 2012, fifteen men affiliated with the club were each sentenced to two-and-a-half years in prison after being convicted of aggravated assault, theft and property damage. Four others were released without conviction.

== Thailand ==
Since 2012, Thailand has hosted Hells Angels nomads – members not affiliated with any particular regional chapter. A Pattaya chapter was founded in April 2016. It was reported in 2017 that the club has fourteen fully patched members in the country – five Australians, four Germans, a Canadian and four Thais.

Australian Hells Angels member Luke Joshua Cook and his Thai wife Kanyarat Wedphitak were sentenced to death in November 2018 after being found guilty of attempting to smuggle half a ton of methamphetamine from China into Thailand on board a yacht in June 2015. Thai authorities have stated that Cook, a member of the Pattaya chapter with links to Hells Angels in Sydney, was paid $10 million (฿320 million) by the club to smuggle the drugs for later shipment to Australia.

Wayne Schneider, a high-ranking Australian member of the Hells Angels in Thailand, was abducted at gunpoint outside his villa in Pattaya on November 30, 2015, and taken to a flat where he was tied to a chair and beaten to death by five other Hells Angels. His body was found the following day. Antonio Bagnato, another Australian who hired four fellow Hells Angels to help him kill Schneider over a drug network dispute, was convicted of murder and sentenced to death in February 2017. Tyler Gerard, an American, was sentenced to three years in prison, which was reduced to two years after he assisted in the investigation, for his role in the killing, while Australian Luke Cook was convicted of aiding and abetting by driving Bagnato and his family to the Cambodian border in an attempt to escape justice. Schneider had left Australia for Thailand in 2012 after police linked him to two drug laboratories discovered in southwest Sydney. Bagnato also fled the country after the 2014 murder of Sydney man Bradley Dillon for which he is a suspect.

== Turkey ==
On July 30, 2010, the European police agency Europol issued a warning on an increase of Hells Angels and Bandidos activities in Southeast Europe and Turkey. The newly founded Hells Angels Turkey denied the warning's content, calling the relevant report "utter nonsense" and alleging Europol officials are after more European Union funds. On July 2, 2011, around 20 Hells Angels Turkey members in Kadıköy, Istanbul attacked people in a bar and injured seven of them (two severely) pleading that these people were drinking alcohol on the street and disturbing the neighbourhood. It had been earlier reported that Turkish defectors from Bandidos Germany chapter have joined the ranks of Hells Angels Turkey.

== United Kingdom ==
The Hells Angels have twelve chapters and an estimated 250 members in the United Kingdom. According to the National Criminal Intelligence Service (NCIS), the British Hells Angels are involved in cannabis and amphetamine trafficking, as well as contract killing, extortion, prostitution, money laundering and credit card fraud. The NCIS called the Hells Angels "the fastest-growing organised crime group in the world" and also accused the club of being responsible for more assaults and murders than any other gang in the country.

== United States ==
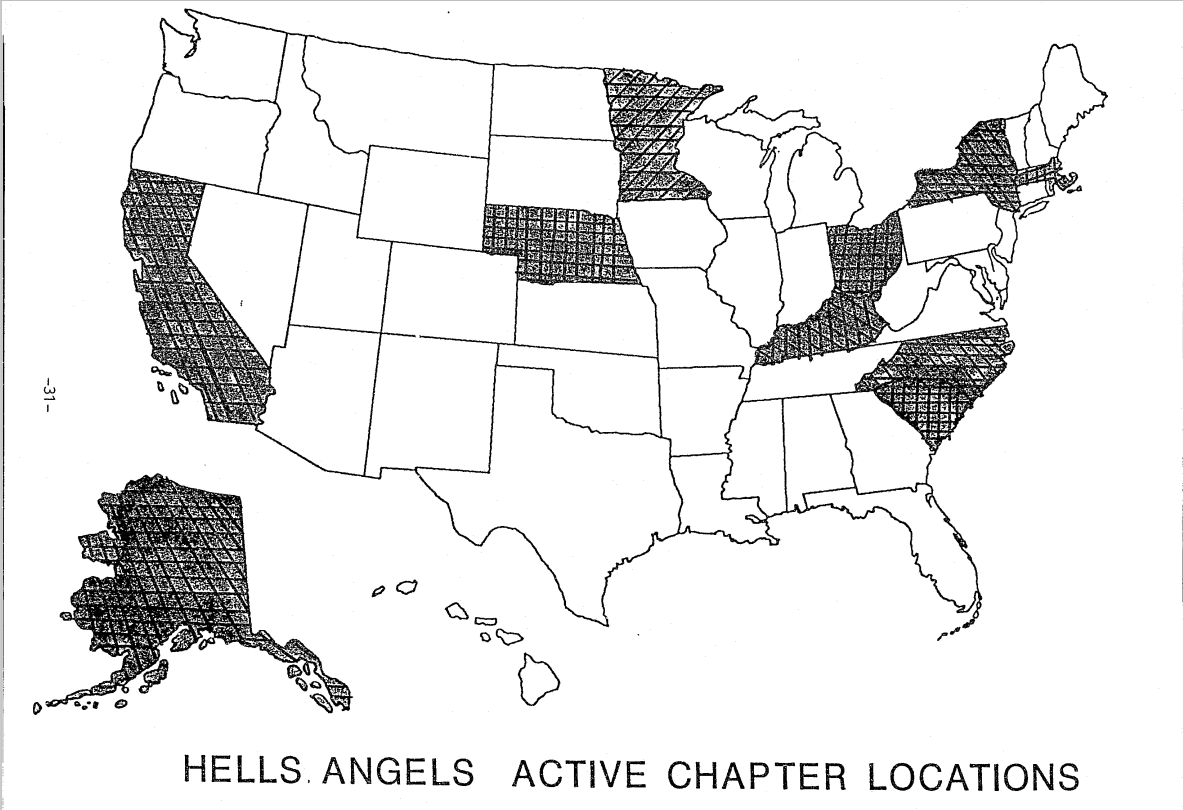
A map showing locations of HAMC chapters in the United States c. 1991

The HAMC is designated an outlaw motorcycle gang by the Department of Justice. There are an estimated 92 Hells Angels chapters in 27 U.S. states, with a membership of over 800. Due to the club's designation as a "known criminal organization" by the State Department and Department of Homeland Security, the United States has a federal policy prohibiting its foreign members from entering the country. According to the 2005 National Gang Threat Assessment, The Hells Angels have been involved in drug trafficking, gunrunning, extortion, money laundering, insurance fraud, kidnapping, robbery, theft, counterfeiting, contraband smuggling, loan sharking, prostitution, trafficking in stolen goods, motorcycle and motorcycle parts theft, assault, murder, bombings, arson, intimidation and contract killing. The club's role in the narcotics trade involves the production, transportation and distribution of marijuana and methamphetamine, in addition to the transportation and distribution of cocaine, hashish, heroin, LSD, MDMA, PCP and diverted pharmaceuticals. According to the Federal Bureau of Investigation (FBI), the HAMC may earn up to $1 billion in drug sales annually.

The Hells Angels are allied with numerous smaller motorcycle gangs – such as the Devils Diciples, the Diablos, El Forastero, the Galloping Goose, the Hessians, the Iron Horsemen, the Red Devils, the Sons of Silence, and the Warlocks – and have associated in criminal ventures with the Buffalo, Cleveland, Gambino, Genovese, Los Angeles, Patriarca, and San Jose crime families, as well as the Aryan Brotherhood, the Mexican Mafia, and the Nazi Lowriders. Rival motorcycle gangs include the Bandidos, the Breed, the Mongols, the Outlaws, the Pagans, the Sons of Satan, and the Vagos.

== See also ==
- Bandidos MC criminal allegations and incidents
- Mongols MC criminal allegations and incidents
- Outlaws MC criminal allegations and incidents

== Books ==
- Sher, Julian; Marsden, William (2006). Angels of Death: Inside the Bikers' Empire of Crime. Toronto: Alfred Knopf Canada. ISBN 9780307370327.

== Bibliography ==
- Veno, Arthur (2007), The Mammoth Book of Bikers, Avalon Publishing Group, ISBN 9780786720460
- Caine, Alex (2012). Charlie and the Angels: The Outlaws, the Hells Angels and the Sixty Years War. Toronto: Random House Canada. ISBN 9780307358950.
- Christie, George (2016). Exile on Front Street: My Life as a Hells Angel. New York City: Thomas Dunne Books. ISBN 9780283072666.
- Langton, Jerry Fallen Angel: The Unlikely Rise of Walter Stadnick and the Canadian Hells Angels Toronto: John Wiley & Sons, 2006, ISBN 9781443427258.
- Langton, Jerry (2010). Showdown: How the Outlaws, Hells Angels and Cops Fought for Control of the Streets'. Toronto: John Wiley & Sons. ISBN 978-0470678787.
- Sher, Julian & Marsden, William The Road To Hell How the Biker Gangs Are Conquering Canada, Toronto: Alfred Knopf, 2003, ISBN 0-676-97598-4
- Schnedier, Stephen Iced: The Story of Organized Crime in Canada, Toronto: John Wiley & Sons, 2009, ISBN 0470835001
