= List of gangs in New Zealand =

List of gangs

The following is a list of gangs, criminal enterprises, and crime syndicates in New Zealand.

== Māori and Polynesian gangs ==
- New Zealand Nomads
- Head Hunters Motorcycle Club
- Mongrel Mob
- King Cobras
- Tribesmen Motorcycle Club
- Black Power
- Killer Beez
- Uru Taha / West Side
- BTW (Bad Troublesome Ward)
- Aotearoa Natives
- 28 Brotherhood

== Drug cartels ==
- Sinaloa Cartel

== Crips and Bloods subsets ==
- Chapter: (TCG)/(Tongan Crip Gang) (South Los Angeles & Central Auckland) Est. 1990
- Chapter: (37)/(Crip Gang) Neighborhoods: Onehunga & Glen Innes, (Central Auckland) Est.1997 Sets of: (YRCB, RCB, 53Z)
- Chapter: (36)/(Crip Family) Neighborhoods: Mangere, Mangere East, (South Auckland) Est. 2003 Sets of: (Crips On Top, Juvenile Cripped Out Souljahz & 3Z Gang)
- Chapter: (33)/(Central Crips) Neighborhoods: Mt Roskill, Roskill South, (Central Auckland) Est. 2000 Sets of: (Dope Money Sex, Junior Don Kings, 2CEEZ)
- Chapter: (23)/(Blue Cartel) Neighborhoods: Otahuhu & Mt Wellington, (South Auckland) Est. 2008 Sets of: (Bone Crushers, RBLS)
- Chapter: (NHC) aka (Neighbourhood Crips)
- United Blood Nation

== Triad ==
- Sam Gor
- 14K
- Sun Yee On
- Shui Fong
- Big Circle Gang

== Caucasian/white supremacist ==
- Right Wing Resistance
- Sadistic Souls Motorcycle Club
- Ruthless Boot Boys
- Rodent Aryan Brotherhood
- White Power Creed
- Chaos Skins

== Outlaw motorcycle clubs ==
- Comancheros
- Outcasts Motorcycle Club
- Head Hunters Motorcycle Club
- Devils Henchmen
- Lone Legion Brotherhood
- Greazy Dogs
- Highway 61 Motorcycle Club
- Tyrants Motorcycle Club
- Mothers Motorcycle Club
- Hells Angels
  - Red Devils Motorcycle Club
- Barbarian Stormtroopers
- Bandidos Motorcycle Club
- Southern Vikings
- Rebels Motorcycle Club
- Forty Five Motorcycle Club
- Road Knights
- Filthy Few Motorcycle Club
- Huhu Motorcycle Club
- Magog Motorcycle Club
- Outlaws Motorcycle Club
- Satans Slaves Motorcycle Club
- Mongols Motorcycle Club
- Sinn Fein Motorcycle Club

== Defunct organised crime groups ==
- Lost Breed – Former outlaw motorcycle club. Shut down by the Hells Angels in 2015.
- Fourth Reich
- Epitaph Riders

== See also ==
- Gangs in New Zealand
- Destiny Church (New Zealand)
