= Lone Legion Brotherhood =

New Zealand outlaw motorcycle club

Lone Legion motorcycle association
- Abbreviation: LLMC
- Region served: New Zealand

The Lone Legion Motorcycle Association was an outlaw motorcycle club located in Blenheim, New Zealand.

The Lone Legion established itself in Blenheim during the 1970s, and considered the town its exclusive territory, successfully excluding other gangs from town until about 2007.

In September 2007, a fatal shooting outside the clubhouse resulted in four gang members being charged with murder, with one being found guilty. In the aftermath of the shooting, the gang demolished its clubhouse, apparently in anticipation of Police seeking a court order to demolish fortifications. In 2010, gang members built a warehouse on a new site. The family of the murder victim criticized both the Marlborough District Council and Police for allowing the gang to establish a new pad.

According to media and Police the club is a member of the "A-Team", an alliance between several NZ biker groups including the Outcasts MC, the Epitaph Riders MC, the Forty-Fives MC, the Southern Vikings MC, Satan's Slaves MC, Sinn Fein MC and the Lost Breed MC.

In 2019, Carl Bradley, writing in the NZ Herald, reported that the Lone Legion had patched over to the Outlaws MC.

== See also ==
- Gangs in New Zealand
- List of outlaw motorcycle clubs
