= Hessians Motorcycle Club =

Hessians MC
- Founded: 1968
- Founders: Thomas F. Maniscalco
- Founding location: Costa Mesa, California, U.S.
- Years active: 1968–present
- Territory: California, Colorado, Nevada, Oklahoma, Oregon, Idaho and Utah
- Membership: Approximately 160 members (as of 1994)
- Activities: Drug trafficking, murder, robbery and intimidation

The Hessians Motorcycle Club or Hessians MC is an American "one-percenter" or outlaw motorcycle club.

== History ==
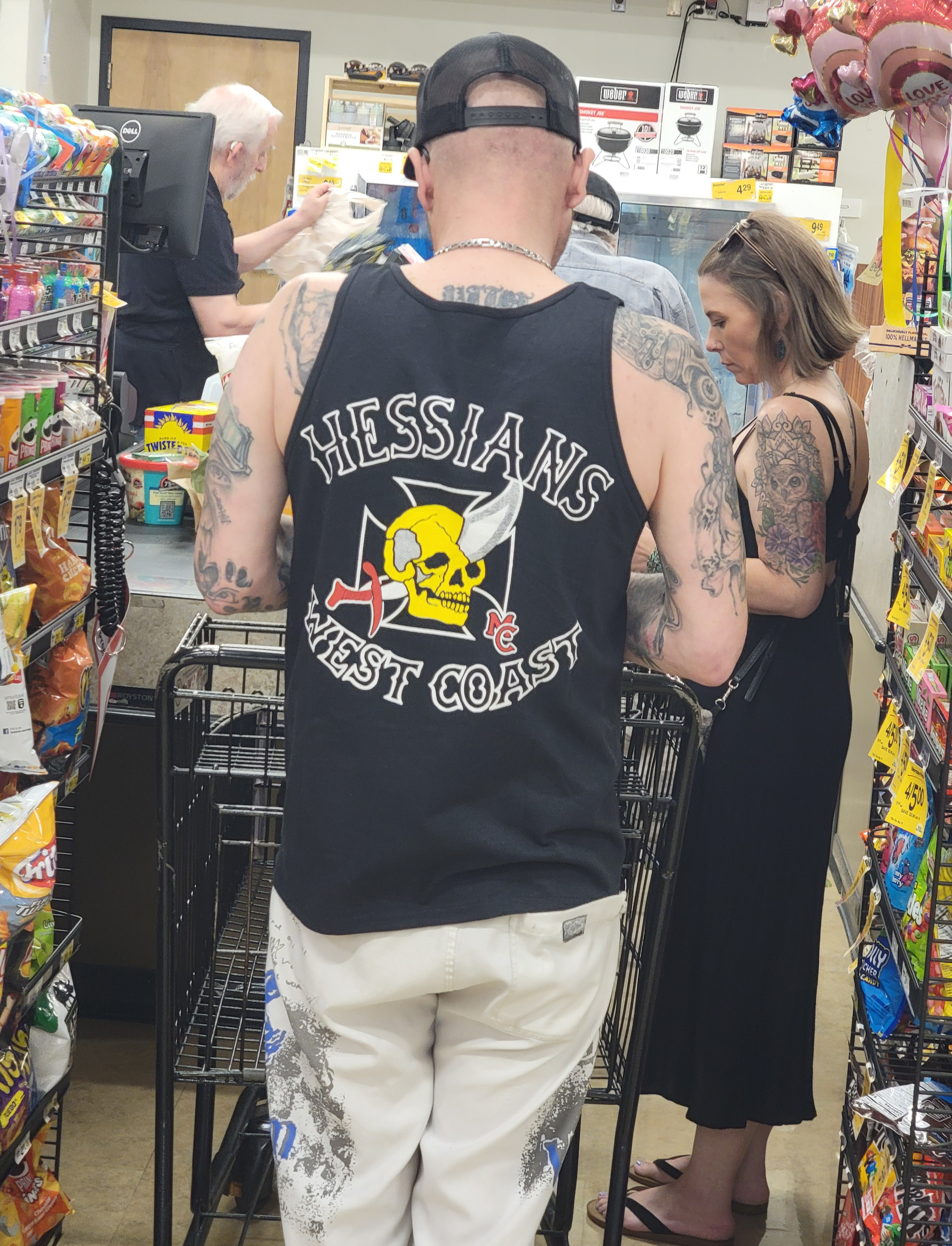
Hessians Motorcycle Club member in 2025

The Hessians Motorcycle Club was founded on March 7, 1968, in California by Thomas F. Maniscalco, a motorcycle enthusiast who would later become an attorney and convicted murderer. The club would soon expand across the nation's western seaboard and in 1972, they claimed to have around 500 members across the United States.

The club's logo features a sabre-pierced skull over an Iron Cross, and their colors are black and white.

The documentary film Hessians MC was released in 2005. It runs for 75 minutes and was produced by Guerilla Docs and directed by Randall Wilson. Bill Hayes, an author who has written extensively about motorcycle clubs, called it "one of the most acclaimed film documentaries on the biker culture".

== Criminal allegations and incidents ==
Club founder Maniscalo was convicted in 1994 for the 1980 murders of Richard Rizzone, Rena Miley, and Thomas Monahan, all associated with the Hessians. The prosecution said that the killings were the result of a dispute about methamphetamine sales and counterfeiting. He served a total of nearly 39 years in jail and then prison after his conviction, until being released in 2023 after a terminal cancer diagnosis. Maniscalo denied his guilt. According to the club, Maniscalo died later in 2023.

In 1994, eight members of the Hessians MC were arrested on drug and weapons charges following a series of raids in California that were conducted by federal, state, county and local law enforcement agencies. The crackdown stemmed from an eight-month investigation into the club, in which ATF agents infiltrated the group's 20-member mother chapter.
