= Highway 61 Motorcycle Club =

Outlaw motorcycle club

- Founded: 1968
- Founding location: Auckland, New Zealand
- Years active: 1968–present
- Territory: New Zealand and Australia
- Criminal activities: Drug dealing, rape, theft, murder

The Highway 61 Motorcycle Club is an outlaw motorcycle club based in New Zealand and also operating in Australia. The Committee on Gangs report of 1981 (known as the Comber Report) said they were one of the two largest of the 20 outlaw motorcycle gangs in New Zealand. In the 1990s they were the largest in the country. They were still the largest in 2010, even though their membership numbers had declined. As of 2019 they were considered one of the ten main gangs (including motorcycle gangs and ethnically based gangs) in the country. Their membership is largely people of Māori and Pacific Island ethnicities. Their colours are black and gold.

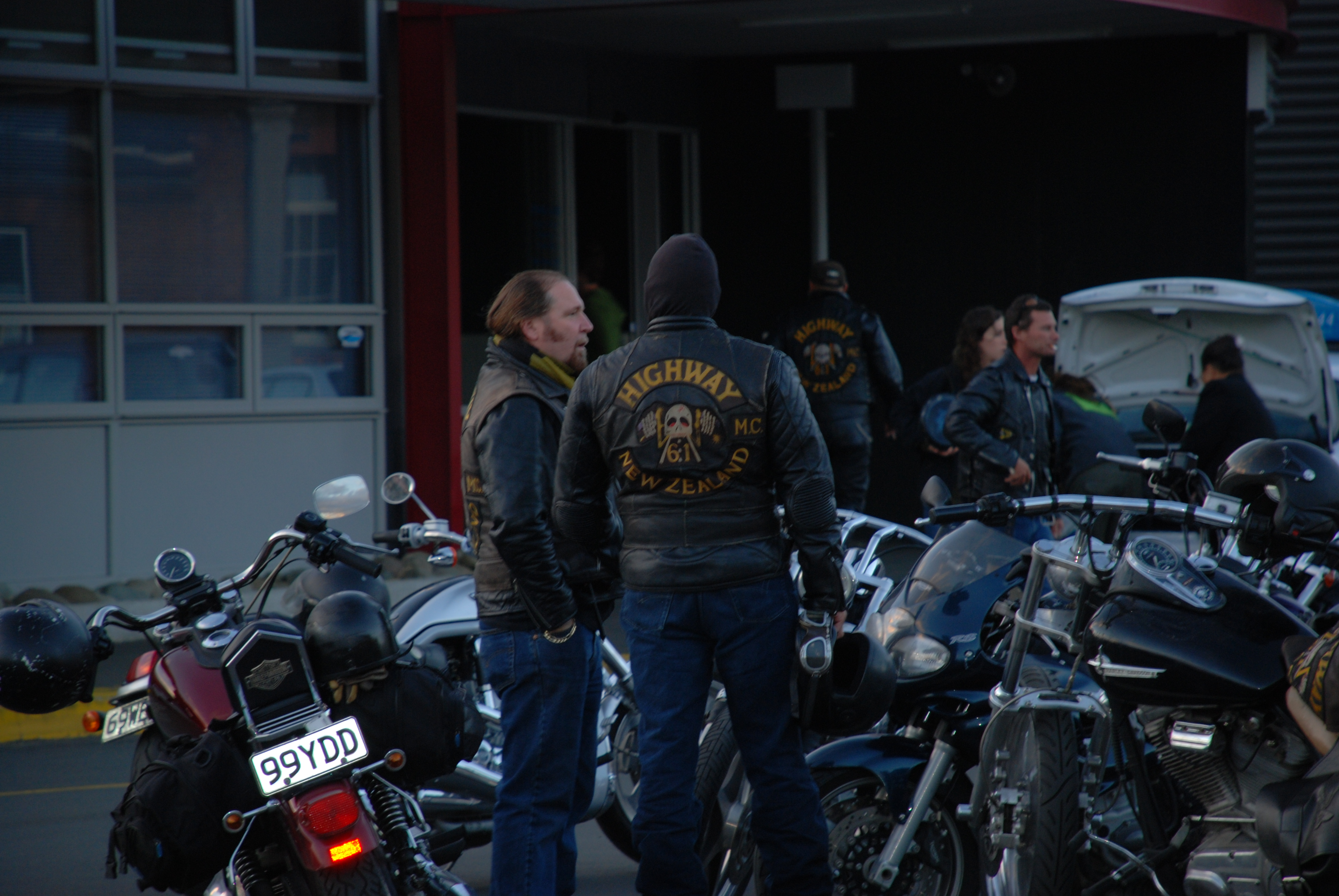
Highway 61 members in Wellington, New Zealand, in 2007

== History ==
The Highway 61 MC was formed in Auckland in 1967 or 1968, and have since expanded across New Zealand and Australia. The Highway 61 patch consists of a skeleton holding onto ape hangers (handlebars) with the road, or highway, seen below the skull.

One of the earliest documented violent clashes involving the Highway 61 Motorcycle Club occurred on 29 December 1975, in Auckland's Mount Eden suburb, where 19-year-old club member Bradley Earl Haora was beaten and then fatally shot in the head with a sawn-off shotgun during a confrontation with Hells Angels members at a Highway 61 property. Three other Highway 61 members were injured in the attack, which stemmed from a dispute over a woman and escalated into a broader rivalry between the clubs.

At the 1979 Nelson Mardi Gras event the Lost Breed clashed with members of Highway 61 from Wellington. 4 were injured and 21 Lost Breed members and associates were arrested.

They expanded into Australia in the 1980s, later setting up a chapter in Brisbane in 1998.

In 1997, Highway 61 members were convicted of murdering a member of the New Zealand Nomads. In 1993, Highway 61 members were convicted of theft, receiving cars valued at nearly $1,000,000.

In 2003, club president Kevin Weavers was accidentally killed by ex-Highway 61 member Kelly Robertson.

== See also ==
- List of outlaw motorcycle clubs

== Sources ==
- Gilbert, Jarrod (2013). Patched: the history of gangs in New Zealand. Auckland University Press. ISBN 9781869407292.
