= Gangs in New Zealand =

There are numerous gangs in New Zealand, of varying criminality, organisation and ethnicity, including outlaw motorcycle gangs, street gangs and ethnically based gangs. A chapter of the Hells Angels motorcycle club was formed in Auckland in 1961, the first Hells Angels chapter outside the US. Soon after, the Mongrel Mob formed in Hastings and Wellington, developing into a predominantly Māori and Pacific Islander gang, and having the largest membership in the country. Through the 1960s and 1970s, other outlaw motorcycle clubs and ethnically based gangs formed, including another predominantly Māori gang, Black Power (not related to the African-American movement), which grew to rival the Mongrel Mob.

There are about 10,000 gang members and prospects in New Zealand as of 2025.

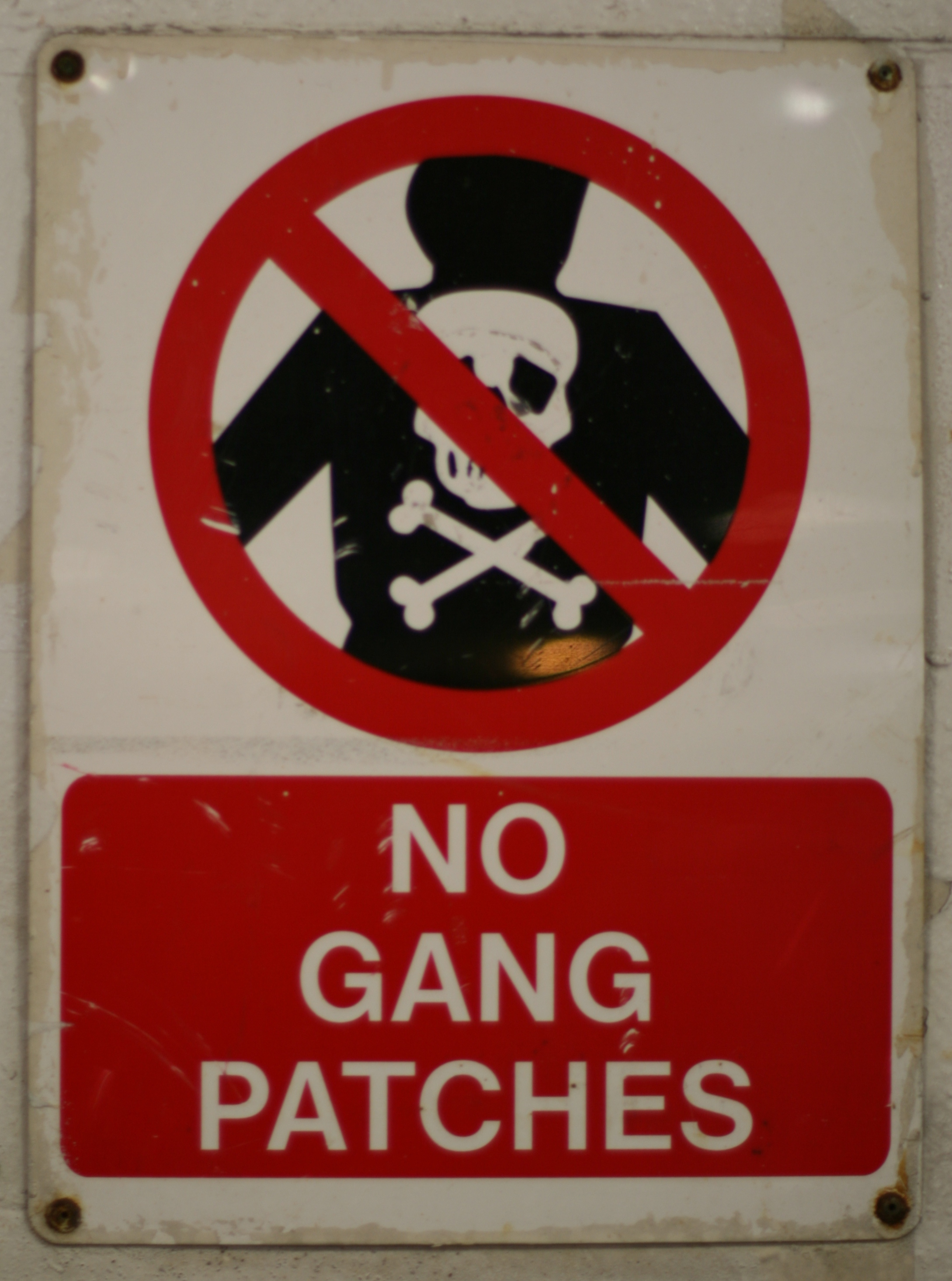
Sign on the Cook Strait ferry Arahura prohibiting the display of gang patches

== Overview ==
=== History ===
The New Zealand Police have distinguished between "New Zealand gangs" with predominantly Māori and Pacific Islander membership, outlaw motorcycle gangs and local street gangs.

New Zealand has had youth and street gangs since the 1950s, according to sociologist Jarrod Gilbert. By the 1970s, established gangs included Black Power, Mongrel Mob, Head Hunters and Barbarian Stormtroopers. Some had friends in high places, with Prime Minister Robert Muldoon partying at a Black Power pad in 1976 and Mayor of Wellington Michael Fowler stumping bail for seven of them after an altercation with the Mongrel Mob. Organised crime gangs such as those that currently dominate in New Zealand mostly date from the 1970s. The Police named the three most prominent "New Zealand gangs" as Black Power, the Mongrel Mob, and the Nomads, as of 2007. Examples of local street gangs in 2007 were the Junior Don Kings (JDK) and Dope Money Sex (DMS) of Auckland.

'Gangsta' style gangs have been a presence in New Zealand since the early 1990s but individual gangs of this type are typically short lived. New Zealand gangs have generally been heavily influenced by their American counterparts and have remained a significant social problem since 1990. Although Black Power takes its name from the black liberation movement of the same name, in many ways it and similar gangs are much more akin to white American motorcycle gangs such as the Hell's Angels. Since the early 1990s newer gangs have primarily been influenced by African American street gangs such as the Crips and Bloods.

In December 2019, Stuff reported that returning New Zealand deportees from Australia had established local chapters of the Comanchero and Mongols biker gangs in New Zealand. Many of these gang members had been deported under Section 501 of the Australian Migration Act 1958, which has accelerated the deportation of criminal non-residents from Australia since 2015

=== Gang patches ===
Some political leaders including the-then Māori Party co-leader Pita Sharples have called for gang patches to be made illegal. In 2009 the Wanganui District Council voted to ban gang patches, but it was overturned following a judicial review instigated by the Hells Angels. The council tried again in 2011, this time restricting the ban to just the central business district, malls and parks. A law banning gang patches from government and public buildings was introduced in 2012 by National Party Member of Parliament (MP) Todd McClay. Police welcomed the law, but critics such as Mana Movement MP Hone Harawira claimed it was racist against Māori. It was passed as the Prohibition of Gang Insignia in Government Premises Act 2013, and has been in force since August 2013.

In February 2024, the Sixth National Government of New Zealand comprising the National Party, ACT Party and New Zealand First announced plans to introduce legislation banning gang patches in public. On 19 September 2024, the Government passed the Gangs Act 2024, which banned gang patches. While National, ACT and NZ First supported the bill, it was opposed by the Labour, Green, and Māori parties.

=== Incarceration rates ===
Gang members account for a rapidly increasing proportion of incarcerations in New Zealand. A New Zealand Ministry of Justice study showed that in 1991 just under 80% of prison inmates had no gang history, and just over 90% had no current gang membership. Of the prison population, 4% were members of the Mongrel Mob and 4.3% former members, while 3.6% were current and 3.2% former members of Black Power. No other gang had more than one percent of the prison population. A similar study in 2003 showed that 11.3% of prison inmates were gang members. Of these, 35% were Mongrel Mob and 33% Black Power, with no other individual gang having more than 5% of the imprisoned gang population. As of April 2013, gang members and affiliates account for over 30% of inmates, with over 10% of New Zealand prisoners being Mongrel Mob members.

=== Gang membership ===
According to the 2007 book Gangs by English journalist Ross Kemp, New Zealand had more gangs per head than any other country in the world, with about seventy major gangs and over 4,000 patched members in a population of 4 million people. In 2019 the Police recorded 6,500 patched or prospective gang members in the country, with the ten main gangs being the Head Hunters, Bandidos, Hells Angels, King Cobras, Black Power, Mongrel Mob, Tribesmen, Rebels, Devils Henchmen and Highway 61.

In October 2019, Stuff reported that New Zealand gangs seemed to be recruiting members at a greater rate than the New Zealand Police. Between October 2017 and October 2019, the number of patched gang members and "prospects" had risen by 1,400 to an estimated total of 6,375. By comparison, the number of Police officers during that same period had increased by only 893. Stuff attributed the increase in gang membership to the return of deported "bikie gang" members from Australia, who had been deported under recent Australian anti-bikie gang legislation. In addition, the Mongrel Mob started a female chapter.

By June 2021, there were 8,061 patched gang members on the Police Gang List, a 4,000 increase from 2016. By November 2022, the number of gang members on the Gang Harm Insight Centre's Gang List had risen to 8,357; the highest number ever recorded in New Zealand history. While National Party police spokesperson Mark Mitchell claimed that the Labour Government's alleged "soft on crime" policies had contributed to a 56% increase in gang membership since 2017, Police Minister Chris Hipkins responded that the Police Gang List included people who had left the gangs or who were associates rather than formal gang members.

In mid July 2025, there were just over 10,000 gang members, including prospects.

== Prominent gangs ==
=== Black Power ===
Black Power was formed about 1970 in Wellington as the Black Bulls, and its membership is primarily Māori and Pasifika. It has been involved with various kinds of crime, particularly drug dealing. Its symbol is the clenched fist of the American black power movement, and their colours are blue and black.

==== Nomads ====
In 1977 the Nomads split from Black Power.

=== Head Hunters MC ===
The Head Hunters motorcycle club is one of the fastest growing motorcycle clubs in the country. It has chapters in West Auckland, Wellsford, Northland and most recently Wellington and Christchurch after patching over the Epitaph Riders. Its beginning is said to go back to 1967 and has been historically tied to West Auckland although it maintains a presence in Ellerslie through a senior member. In 2011 members of the Sinn Fein motorcycle club in Wellington have patched over to become part of the Head Hunters motorcycle club.

=== King Cobras ===
The King Cobras are a Central Auckland-based gang with its origins born out of the Polynesian Panthers in the early 1970s whose ranks are predominantly Pacific Islanders but not exclusive of others. Their reputed turf is reported to stretch from the Downtown area to Māngere Papatoetoe and Manurewa. The Cobras also have links and associations with activity in the far north Moerewa Whangārei and North Shore, and an established presence in the Hutt Valley and the Wellington area. The gang is also known to have a presence in Christchurch.

In 2009 it was reported that members of the gang had been involved in a multimillion-dollar methamphetamine drug ring organised within Paremoremo Prison, and previously ran another large drug ring along with the Head Hunters. The Cobras maintained a headquarters in Ponsonby up until August 2011 as they are reported to be shifting premises.

=== Bandidos MC ===
In 2012, the notorious worldwide Motorcycle Club known as the Bandidos set up in South Auckland and later established a second chapter in Christchurch. The Bandidos have gone on to establish prospect chapters in Dunedin and Invercargill.

=== Hells Angels MC ===
The Hells Angels motorcycle club founded a chapter in Auckland in 1961 and has since taken over gangs in Whanganui. New Zealand had the first chapter of the Hells Angels outside the US.

In 2011 the club made headlines when it tried to register a lottery. It made headlines again in late 2015 when it shutdown Nelson's long-standing Lost Breed MC to stamp its mark on the city.

=== Highway 61 MC ===
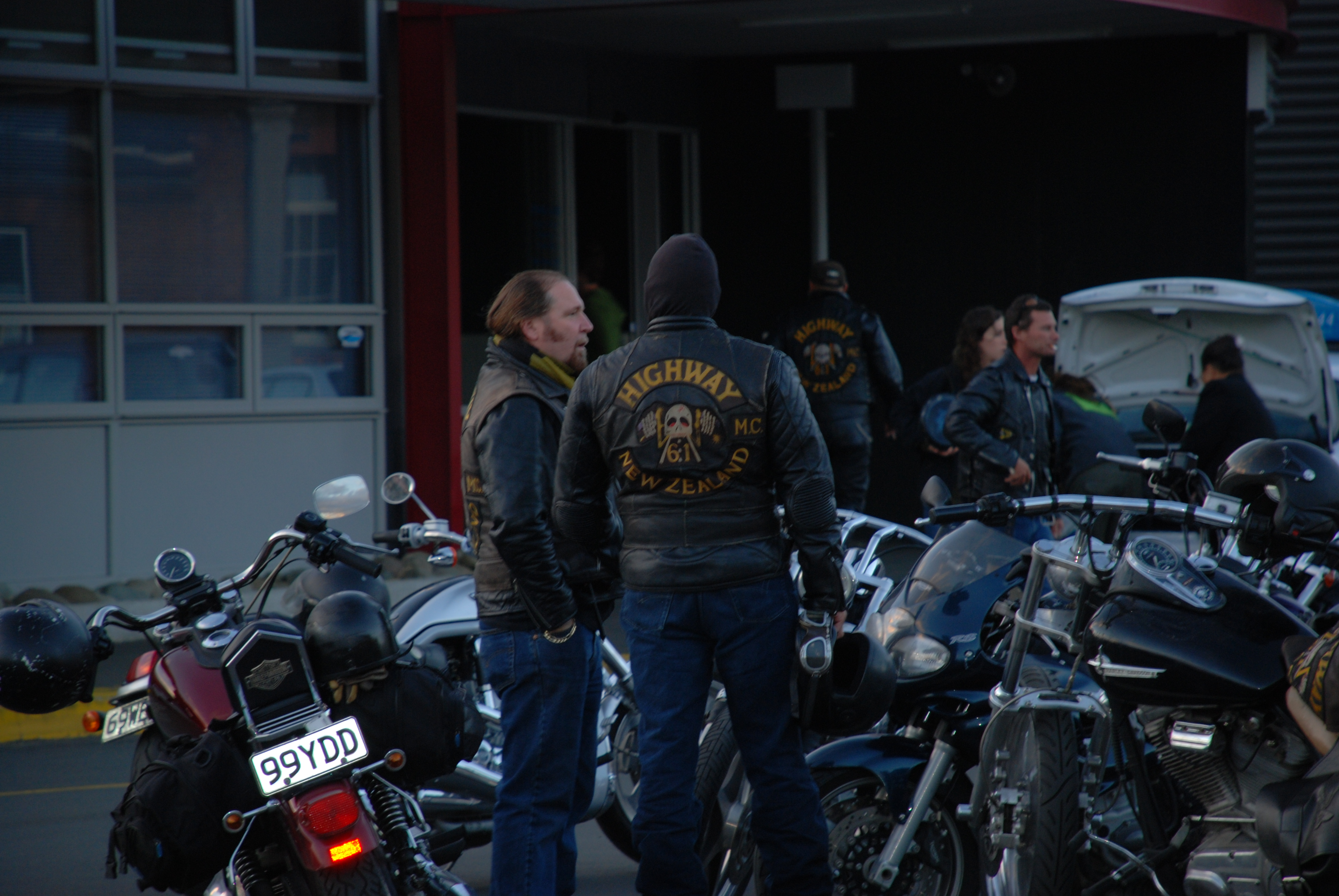
Highway 61 members in Wellington, New Zealand

The Highway 61 motorcycle club was founded in 1968 and was the largest outlaw motorcycle club in New Zealand during the 1980s, 90s up until 2010. It has chapters in Auckland, Hastings, Rotorua, Northland, Wellington and Christchurch, and by 2008 had expanded into Brisbane, Sydney and the Gold Coast in eastern Australia. They are mainly European and Māori in descent.

=== Mongrel Mob ===
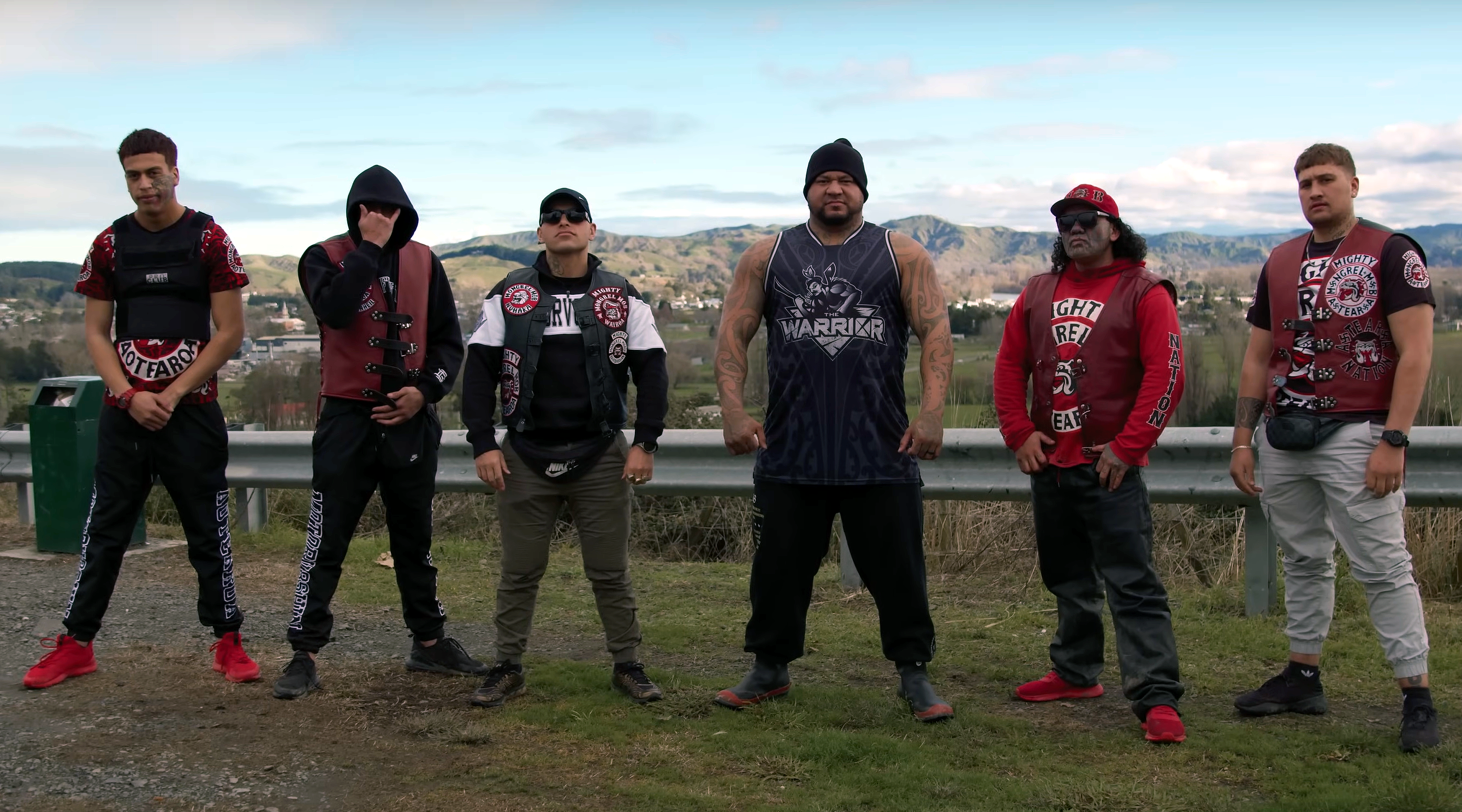
A group of members

The Mongrel Mob was formed and organised in Hastings and Wellington in the early 1960s. Originally consisting of Pākehā youth, it became primarily Māori and Pacific Islander, like its Black Power rivals. The gang has been active in organised crime and has been involved in several murders. Its symbol is a bulldog wearing a German Stahlhelm, and the gang makes use of other Nazi imagery. Their colours are red and black. The Mongrel Mob is currently the largest gang in New Zealand.

=== Rebels MC ===
In 2010 members of the Australian motorcycle club the Rebels announced they would be establishing a presence in New Zealand in 2011. Rebels MC members have been sighted wearing their patches in various places throughout the North Island in early 2011.

=== Road Knights MC ===
The Road Knights motorcycle club operates in the South Island. They are based in Invercargill, Timaru and Dunedin.

=== Rock Machine MC ===
At the beginning of 2014, members of the Canadian motorcycle club the Rock Machine established a Nomad chapter in New Zealand. In August of the same year they publicly announced they had established a second chapter in Christchurch.

=== Tribesmen MC ===
The Tribesmen is a prominently Māori motorcycle club formed in the 1980s in Ōtara, they have a presence in South Auckland and as far south as Rotorua and Murupara. The Tribesmen are also rivals with the Mongrel Mob.

==== Killer Beez ====
The Tribesmen have a feeder youth street gang called Killer Beez (sometimes Killer Bees, Killabeez, or KBZ), possibly a reference to the hip hop group Killa Beez, a name given to Wu-Tang Clan affiliates who also wear yellow and black. Killer Beez was headed by Josh Masters, formerly a vice-president of the Tribesmen gang. Masters was one of 44 people from both gangs arrested in a police swoop in May 2008. In total, 60 Killer Beez members were arrested in an operation that involved 110,000 intercepted messages. Charges included supplying methamphetamine, conspiracy to supply methamphetamine and money laundering. Masters pleaded guilty but as of October 2011 was fighting to have that overturned.

In 2011 Vila Lemanu was the most senior Killer Beez member not in prison, he was on the run for several months before having his conviction quashed by the Court of Appeal and a new trial ordered.

The Killer Beez controlled the record label Colourway Records until all its assets were seized in 2008.

=== Red Devils MC ===
The Red Devils Motorcycle Club has a presence in Mount Eden along with strong ties to the Hells Angels. In 2012 the club was involved in a high-profile anti-drug operation which later fell apart under heavy scrutiny in court. A range of charges laid against twenty one club members and associates were stayed, and later dropped altogether, in the belief that police had committed a "gross abuse of process" in posing as court officials to obtain a fake arrest warrant. The case against the club was officially dropped in early 2015 with the final charges dismissed on 1 July. Police now believe that the Nelson chapter has become a full-fledged prospect chapter of the Hells Angels.

== Other gangs ==
=== Motorcycle gangs ===
- Brotherhood 28 MC (Auckland)
- Devils Henchmen MC (Timaru) Their headquarters were taken over by Rebels MC in May 2023, and were then purchased by Timaru District Council and demolished the same day.
- Filthy Few MC (Tauranga, Rotorua, Waihi and Matamata)
- Greasy Dogs (Mount Maunganui)
- Huhu MC (Tokoroa), started as a largely bush crew from the early 1950s, MC in the early 1970s.
- Lost Breed (Nelson) – defunct
- Magogs MC (New Plymouth)
- Outlaws MC (Napier – patched over to the international club in mid-2014)
- Satans Slaves MC (Wellington)

=== Race-based gangs ===
- 14K Triad – Hong Kong-based Chinese triad gang, with activity in Auckland area.
- Tribal Huk (Ngāruawāhia)
- FBI's (Full Blooded Islanders) – Pacific Islanders, in Wellington
- Right Wing Resistance – A white supremacist skinhead gang formed by Kyle Chapman, based originally in Christchurch, but claims to have a presence across the country.
- Fourth Reich (New Zealand gang) – A white supremacist skinhead gang.

Street/youth gangs

- Junior Don Kings (Roskill South)
- Darksiders (connected to Black Power, Wellington)
- Dope Money Sex (Central Auckland) (also under the Crips umbrella).
- T.O.C. (Thugs of Canal) Avondale-based street gang which is named after the street they hold ground on.
- J.C.B. (Junior Crip Boys) Ōtāhuhu-based Crip gang.

== See also ==
- List of gangs in New Zealand
- New Zealand culture
- Crime in New Zealand
- Wanganui District Council (Prohibition of Gang Insignia) Act 2009
