= Fourth Reich (New Zealand gang) =

Neo-Nazi skinhead prison gang

- Founded: Early 1990s
- Founded at: Paparua Prison, Christchurch
- Type: White power skinhead, street gang
- Region served: South Island, New Zealand
- Members: 15

The Fourth Reich was a racist skinhead prison gang formed in Paparua Prison (officially known as Christchurch Prison) in Christchurch in the early 1990s that terrorised communities in Nelson and on the West Coast of the South Island, New Zealand. There is little evidence to suggest that the Fourth Reich still exists either in the prison system, or in New Zealand society.

== History ==
The North Island of New Zealand is more ethnically diverse, while the South Island tends to have greater concentrations of Pākehā (New Zealander of European descent) communities. In virtue of this demographic feature, most racist skinhead gangs have tended to be active on the South Island. The Fourth Reich was no exception in this respect, having been formed in the Paparua prison in Christchurch. The gang terrorised communities in Nelson and the West Coast of the South Island.

The issue of when the gang was formed is both vague and contentious. Most sources assert that the group was formed in the early 1990s. Greg Newbold, Emeritus Professor at the University of Canterbury, asserts that the group formed in 1992, while Lynch asserts that the group was co-founded in 1994 by Malcolm George Chaston.

According to researchers, the release of Romper Stomper in 1992 was a shot in the arm for skinhead gangs and white supremacist ideology. During the late 1990s and early 2000s, the Fourth Reich terrorised communities on the West Coast and in Nelson on the South Island. Practitioners throughout the New Zealand national security sector perceived that the Fourth Reich presented a credible terrorist threat to the country during the early 2000s. Between 1996 and 2011, members of the Fourth Reich were charged, tried and sentenced with some of the most lengthy prison sentences in the history of modern New Zealand for crimes of shocking violence, predominantly with racist and bigoted dimensions.

There is little evidence to suggest that the Fourth Reich still exists either in the prison system or in New Zealand society.

== Ideology ==
According to research interviews, security practitioners in the New Zealand national security sector perceived the Fourth Reich and its members as very different to other white power skinhead groups, both those that had existed for some time in New Zealand, and those that had sprung up in the wake of the movie Romper Stomper in 1992. Whereas these other groups were engaged in criminal activities and were thought to pose a menace to society, none were thought to pose a credible terrorist threat to the nation. Fourth Reich, on the other hand, was perceived not only to be both more dangerous and racist than these other right wing extremist groups, but "considerably more ideologically driven". According to one security practitioner interviewed, there was concern throughout the New Zealand security sector during the early 2000s that the Fourth Reich was planning a terrorist attack with mass casualties. Subsequent investigations failed to uncover "explicit evidence" that such a plot was planned.

Whether they posed a real terrorist threat or not, Fourth Reich members were some of the most violent and dangerous criminals local police had ever come across. According to Detective Derek Shaw who investigated the gang in 1997, its members were the most ruthless he had confronted throughout his 25-year career. feared for not only his own life, but for the lives of his family. At the height of the crackdown on the gang in 1998, Sergeant Greg Sparrow was forced to relocate his wife and children for two weeks after receiving a credible threat to his life.

The degree to which this violence was motivated by neo-Nazi or white supremacist ideology is contentious. On the one hand, the view of practitioners in the New Zealand national security establishments was that Fourth Reich members were "considerably more ideologically driven" than those of other skinhead groups, while local police highlighted the degree to which they were motivated by hate, and the role of hate in their 'philosophy'. Sociologist Jarrod Gilbert argues, given that Fourth Reich member Neihana Foster was biracially Maori (indigenous New Zealander) and Pākehā, and he and fellow gang member Aaron Howie murdered Maori rugby player Hemi Hutley because of his race, that this reflects the lack of ideological and philosophical rigors of the group. In a similar vein, Addison argues that most skinhead gangs in New Zealand lack a "coherent belief system or philosophy", citing research which suggests that members of New Zealand skinhead gangs were not familiar with white supremacist ideology, instead primarily motivated by a cocktail of alienation and hate.

== Membership ==
The Fourth Reich was a relatively small and hardcore skinhead gang with approximately fifteen members. Not long after the gang was founded, it garnered a following in Christchurch, Nelson, Greymouth, Timaru and Dunedin. Full members of the gang wore black t-shirts with the gang's logo: a large Celtic cross with a swastika at the centre.

According to research conducted by Addison, members of New Zealand skinhead gangs, much like those of similar groups in England, are associated with social estrangement, abusive and deprived upbringing, low socioeconomic status, social disaffection, drug abuse and criminal deviance. This stands in stark contrast to skinheadism in the United States, where members tend to be well-adjusted, employed and socially integrated. Furthermore, American skinhead groups tend be well-organised with a "developed political consciousness".

Addison's depiction of members of New Zealand skinhead gangs is certainly borne out by members of the Fourth Reich. They were opiate users and without a doubt criminally deviant. Shannon Brent Flewellen's chequered and troubled youth is a case in point. Raised as the son of a drug-addict and step-son of an iwi leader and gang member who was murdered, he reportedly sought refuge under the family home as a child while gang business was conducted inside the house.

=== Neihana Foster: A Maori member of the Fourth Reich ===
An interesting feature of New Zealand skinhead gangs is that Maori are occasionally members. This was infamously highlighted in 1991 when Neihana Foster, biracially Maori and Pākehā and visibly of Maori heritage, was charged and convicted alongside fellow Fourth Reich member for the murder of Hemi Hutley.

== Organization ==
Little information is available about the organizational structure of the Fourth Reich. According to one source, Ivan Gugich was the president of the gang in 1997. The literature points to Malcom George Chaston, Leighton Wilding and Ivan Gugich as co-founders of the gang. Leighton Brent Wilding was sergeant-at-arms. In 1997, an unnamed male member of the gang claimed that he had the rank of private after being beaten, stabbed and having his finger cut off by two other members of the gang.

As discussed above, New Zealand skinhead gangs lack the organisational structure of American skinhead groups. There is no evidence to suggest that the Fourth Reich was part of a national or international organisation. Like other racist New Zealand gangs, the Fourth Reich was "transient and directionless" and this in turn affected its longevity.

== Investigations and prosecutions ==
Although the New Zealand security sector perceived that the Fourth Reich was thought to present a credible terrorist threat during the early 2000s, the group was never investigated, charged, or tried under New Zealand's Terrorism Suppression Act of 2002. While the New Zealand security sector was concerned about the possibility that the Fourth Reich might commit a terrorist act with mass casualties during the same period, there is no evidence to suggest that the Act was passed expressly to deal with that particular threat. The Act was characterised by then Solicitor General David Collins as "virtually unworkable" and "almost impossible to apply in a coherent manner" in 2007 and remained unchanged in 2019 after the Christchurch mosque shootings.

By the late 1990s, members of the Fourth Reich had procured an infamous reputation as some of the most ruthless murderers on the South Island. During their trial in 1997, Aaron Howie and Neihana Foster both received life sentences, after being found to have murdered Maori rugby player Hemi Hutley, then 23 years old. Hutley was beaten senseless and then dragged 125 metres to the Buller river where he was dumped and later drowned. Both of the defendants were 26 years old at the time. Howie cut his ties with the gang after he was released from prison.

In 1997, Ivan Gugich, then 28, and Greg Dunnill, then 24, were sentenced to eight and seven and a half years respectively. The literature is contentious on what the victim actually did. According to the victim himself, Gugich and Dunnill meted out punishment because he wanted to leave the gang. Two sources assert that the real reason was that he was caught trying to steal the gang's drug supply. Another source asserts that said punishment was meted out because the victim failed to smuggle cannabis-oil into prison. The defendants were found to have beaten and stabbed the victim, whose lung subsequently collapsed, his scalp was cut and peeled back, and his finger was cut off and placed in a bread bag. Gugich cut his ties with the gang after he was released from prison.

In 2005, Hayden Brent McKenzie and associate Leighton Wilding were handed life sentences. It was alleged at trial that at a party in October 1999, James 'Janis' Bamborough, 54 at the time, hugged Leighton Wilding and made lewd comments about his sister's breasts. Later that night, according to witness Michelle Batt, she heard McKenzie say: "Fuck him, he's a faggot. We're going to waste him tonight. We don't like faggots." Wilding was reportedly silent, while Bamborough was reported to have been petrified. Despite being urged to leave with Batt, he remained. Later that night, he was either lured or forced to the Buller River. During the trial, McKenzie and Wilding turned on each other, the defence of each claiming that the other had dragged Bamborough into the water and throttled him. According to one witness, Wilding described how powerful he felt as he squeezed the life from Bamborough's and his body turned lame, while a former girlfriend claimed that McKenzie joked that he had "killed a faggot". Bamborough's body remained undiscovered for five years until McKenzie turned on the Fourth Reich and fingered Wilding for the crime in 2004, leading police to the body. During the trial Wilding claimed to have left the gang in 1998, while McKenzie subsequently had a tattoo reading "Die Nigger Die" removed from his forehead. McKenzie was serving his time in a protection wing, and is reported to have turned away from skinheadism and married in 2004.

In 2003, in what was reported as the "worst racial attack" New Zealand had ever seen, Hayden Brent McKenzie, Shannon Brent Flewellen, and a third party turned Queen's evidence, picked up economics student and Korean national Jae Hyeon Kim while hitchhiking. McKenzie spun the wheels of the car as a ruse to get everybody out of the car and push. As Mr Kim did so, Flewellen strangled him while McKenzie held his arms and "stared into his eyes until he stopped struggling". Flewellen subsequently stomped on Mr Kim's throat, and the three accused then buried him in a secret grave. It is reported that Flewellen later bragged that he had "cut Kim's head off with a spade". Both McKenzie and Flewellen received life sentences.

Finally, in 2011, Malcolm George Chaston was handed a life sentence for the murder of Vanessa Pickering who was stabbed to death in 2010. Chaston was no longer a member of the Fourth Reich at the time of the murder. Prior to his trial in 2011, Chaston had swastika tattoos removed from his face and neck, and changed his name to Maniapoto Walker.

== See also ==
- Gangs in New Zealand
- White pride
