= Lost Breed Motorcycle Club =

Now-defunct outlaw motorcycle club in New Zealand

- Founded: 1976
- Founding location: Nelson, New Zealand
- Years active: 1976 – 21 December 2015
- Territory: Nelson, New Zealand
- Rivals: Fourth Reich (New Zealand gang)

The Lost Breed Motorcycle Club was an outlaw motorcycle club in Nelson, New Zealand, formed in 1976. The club announced that they were strongly opposed to the drug P (Meth) and domestic violence although police consider these claims to be dubious.

At the end of 2015, the group was "shut down" by the Hells Angels with some members patching over to a Hells Angels chapter established in the city.

== See also ==
- Gangs in New Zealand
- List of gangs in New Zealand
- List of outlaw motorcycle clubs
