= Road Knights Motorcycle Club =

Outlaw motorcycle club in New Zealand

- Founded: 1979
- Territory: Invercargill, Dunedin, Timaru

The Road Knights Motorcycle Club is an outlaw motorcycle club that operates in the South Island of New Zealand with a presence in Invercargill, Dunedin, and Timaru. Since 2012, new chapters have been formed in Thailand, Netherlands and the United States.

Its rivalry with the Mongrel Mob boiled over in June 2008 in Invercargill when the Road Knights' building was burned down and two motorcycles stolen. The motorcycles were later found by police at the local Mongrel Mob headquarters but had been set on fire. Two Mongrel Mob members were charged with the arson.

As of 2009, Road Knights membership in New Zealand was low and former leadership had dispersed, died or gone to jail.

== History ==
The Road Knights Motorcycle Club was founded in 1979.

In the late 1980s, the Road Knights became involved in a war with the Damned which resulted in several violent incidents. The first death occurred in October 1987, when Robert Holvey, a Damned associate, was killed with an axle after a ramming incident outside the Invercargill prison. Three Road Knights members were charged with murder, but the charges were later dismissed.

In January 1988, while many police officers were in Arrowtown investigating the murder of Maureen McKinnel, there was a bomb attack against a Waikiwi bank. This was a diversion for a bombing attack against the Road Knights HQ, which caused only minor damage as some of the gelignite bombs failed to detonate. A gang sniper was believed to have been posted to cover the bombers, and shots were fired at a police car. No one was convicted relating to these incidents.

In 2004, Jarrod Mangels was convicted of the 1987 murder of Maureen McKinnel, which happened before he joined the club.
