= Harry Tam =

New Zealand public servant and activist

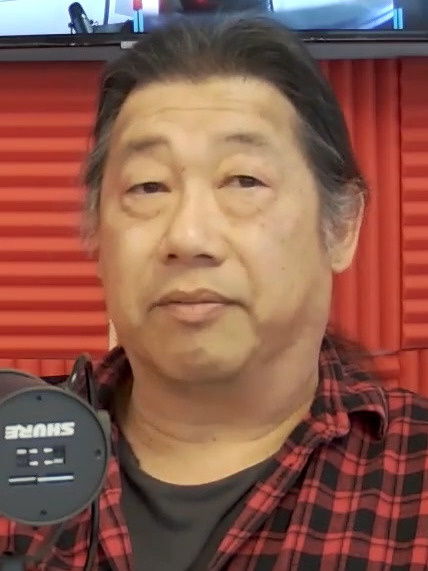
- Tam in 2022
- Born: Masterton, New Zealand
- Known for: Gang member, community organiser, public servant

Harry Tam is a Chinese New Zealander who is a lifetime member of the Mongrel Mob gang. He was also a senior public servant providing policy advice on youth, penal policy and criminal justice issues. Tam is also co-director of the community group Hard 2 Reach (H2R).

== Early life and education ==
Harry Tam was born to Chinese New Zealand parents in Masterton. His father had previously worked at a Chinese laundry in New Zealand before returning to China's Guangdong province where he married Tam's mother. The couple subsequently returned to New Zealand. A year after Tam's birth, his family moved to Wellington where his parents established a diner in Newtown. Tam has two older sisters.

Tam studied at Rongotai College and graduated with a Sixth Form Certificate. During the 1960s and 1970s, Tam became politically aware, taking an interest in the anti-Vietnam War movement and reading Karl Marx's Das Kapital. Tam took an interest in Marx's economic analysis of capitalism and ownership. Tam was also influenced by his form teacher Bill Maung, a Burmese immigrant who had left Myanmar following the 1962 Burmese coup d'état. Maung subsequently started a community school, which Tam helped to run. Maung also worked with the Māori activist group Ngā Tamatoa to find accommodation in Wellington for junior gang members. Through these contact, Tam became involved in the Mongrel Mob gang. He also claimed to be one of the founders of the Polynesian Panthers' Wellington chapter.

== Joining the Mongrel Mob and public service career ==
While socialising with Mongrel Mob members in Wellington during the 1970s, Tam helped set up a work trust in 1975 and convinced Mayor of Wellington Michael Fowler to give them a contract cutting scrub around Karori. Shortly later, Tam was invited to join the local Porirua Mongrel Mob chapter and received his gang patch.

Tam later moved to Dunedin to reunite with his sister. There, he found work with the Dunedin City Council and became a trade union delegate. Following the conflict between the Mongrel Mob's Dunedin chapter and another gang called the Southern Vikings, Tam convinced the Council to hire Mob members as forestry contractors in Waipori to keep them out of trouble. Under the direction of the local Dunedin Mob president, Tam became a field officer for the Department of Labour's Group Employment Liaison Scheme.

Over the years, Tam worked with the Mongrel Mob in Wellington, Auckland and various places. Between 1995 and 1996, government financial assistance for gangs ceased. After finding a job with the Ministry of Youth Affairs, Tam returned his Dunedin gang patch. While living and working in Wellington, the Mongrel Mob conferred on Tam the status of honorary life membership in recognition of his support and skills to the group. During a 2021 interview with TVNZ journalist Jack Tame, Tam attributed the appeal of gang membership to poverty, lack of education and skills and abuse in institutional care.

== Mongrel Mob and Hard 2 Reach ==
By October 2017, TVNZ 1's Marae programme had reported that Tam's company Rangatira Hard2Reach (H2R) was involved in resolving disputes between different gangs.

In January 2018, Tam objected to the sale of counterfeit Mongrel Mob gang patches on the Chinese online retailer AliExpress, urging buyers to return the items to the seller and to ask for their money back. Police also warned buyers about the risks of buying and wearing gang patches due to their association with gangs.

In April 2021, the Auckland District Law Society reported that Tam through his company Hard 2 Reach, had produced 31 cultural reports which provide courts with the backgrounds and context to criminal offenders' offending. According to independent justice advocate Ruth Money, cultural reports have led judges to give 10-15% sentencing discounts.

In mid July 2021, Hawke's Bay Today reported that the Mongrel Mob-led Kahukura drug rehabilitation programme had received NZ$2.75 million in funding from the New Zealand Police's Proceeds of Crime Fund. Harry Tam, as director of the Hard 2 Reach (H2R), ran the Kahukura programme at Tapairu Marae near Waipawa alongside local Mongrel Mob leader Sonny Smith and his wife Mahinaarangi Smith. Prime Minister Jacinda Ardern acknowledged that she had authorised funding to H2R's Kahukura methamphetamine treatment programme over a four year period. Though the opposition National Party had criticised the Sixth Labour Government for funding the Mongrel Mob, Newshub subsequently reported in early August 2024 that the previous Fifth National Government had given NZ$30,000 to Hard to Reach for a family violence programme that it ran in conjunction with the Salvation Army.

In mid-July 2021, Tam attracted criticism from the New Zealand Jewish Council spokesperson Juliet Moses for chanting the Nazi victory salute "Sieg Heil" in a video. Moses described the video as offensive to New Zealand Jews particularly Holocaust survivors while Labour MP Michael Wood described Tam's Sieg Heil chant as "appalling."

On 9 October 2021, Tam threatened legal action against New Zealand First leader Winston Peters for alleging that a female sex worker connected to the Mongrel Mob had caused the Northland Region's COVID-19 scare by travelling to Whangārei on false pretenses. On 19 October, Peters publicly apologised to Tam for alleging that Tam helped a COVID-19 positive case breach the Auckland border.

== Political activism ==
In May 2017, Tam organised a voter registration drive to mobilise gang members to vote during the upcoming 2017 New Zealand general election. Tam said that gang members were also concerned about their children and their futures, and said that the portrayal of gang members in New Zealand society was unfair. Newshub reported that the voter driver was in response to the incumbent Fifth National Government's anti-gang crackdown and ban on gang patches.

In July 2023, Tam organised a public meeting in Dunedin to convince local Māori voters in marginal seats to tactically switch from the Māori electoral roll to the general roll during the 2023 New Zealand general election. He subsequently published a Facebook post stating that Labour MP for Dunedin Ingrid Leary had "gatecrashed" his meeting and was hesitant to be associated with him. In response, Leary said that she had thought that she was going to attend a public meeting organised by the Electoral Commission to encourage people to enroll to vote. She also stated that she did not condone the actions of the Mongrel Mob. While Prime Minister Chris Hipkins described Leary's actions as a "case of miscommunication," opposition National Party MP Mark Mitchell questioned Leary's account that she had accidentally attended Tam's meeting.

During the lead up to the 2023 general election, Tam was a vocal critic of the National Party's anti-gang policy, which he argued failed to address the root causes of gang membership and violence. He also criticised National and the media for capitalising on the death of Opotiki gang leader Steven Taiatini's death and funeral to promote anti-gang policies and rhetoric. In mid-August 2023, Tam also rejected remarks by National Party leader Christopher Luxon that he would be part of a "Coalition of chaos" with Labour, the Green parties and Te Pāti Māori. On 10 October, Tam urged Mongrel Mob members and affiliates to vote against National during the 2023 election. Following the formation of the Sixth National Government, Tam made remarks in February 2024 opposition to the government's anti-gang crackdown.

During the lead up to the 2026 New Zealand general election, Tam and other members of the Mongrel Mob hosted an election event in Auckland in October 2026 that was attended by several Te Pāti Māori and Green Members of Parliament and candidates including Oriini Kaipara, Hana-Rāwhiti Maipi-Clarke, Hūhana Lyndon and Michel Mulipola. Labour leader Chris Hipkins described the visit as a "huge error of judgement" and ruled out offering Te Pāti Māori and the Greens any police or correctional portfolios in a future Labour-led government. Similarly, National MP Paul Goldsmith accused opposition parties of favouring gangs over victims. In response to criticism, Tam defended the presence of politicians at the Mongrel Mob's Health and Wellbeing Day and urged politicians and parties to enter into dialogue with gangs. Tam also criticised Hipkins for expressing regret about the previous Labour Government's funding to his Kahukura rehabilitation programme. He said that the political debate "was overshadowing wider issues contributing to gang involvement, including poverty, trauma and abuse in state care."

== Community work ==
In July 2019, Tam was appointed as the Royal Commission of Inquiry into Abuse in Care's head of policy and research. His appointment was criticised by abuse survivor advocate Paora Moyle and Tam's former partner Charlotte Mildon, who alleged that he was using "standover tactics" against her over a separation dispute. Tam said that the National-led coalition government's 2024 apology to survivors of abuse in state care was difficult to reconcile with politicians' refusal to engage with gangs. He added that public attention on criminal activities like ram raids were a distraction from addressing the causes of crime.

During the COVID-19 pandemic in New Zealand, Tam along with other gang members including Head Hunters member Stephen Daley, Mongrel Mob Waikato Kingdom Wahine Toa member Paula Ormsby, Mongrel Mob member Dennis Makalio, King Cobras member Ta'alili To'omalatai of the King Cobras and Black Power members Michael Te Pou and Denis O'Reilly featured in a social media video in November 2021 urging "hard to reach" communities to receive COVID-19 vaccines. The social media video was organised by Minister of Māori Development Willie Jackson.

== Personal life and legal issues ==
In 1994, Tam was convicted of assaulting his then-wife Charlotte Mildon. He was sentenced to three months' periodic detention and six months' supervision.
