= David Letele =

New Zealand boxer, and rugby league footballer (born 1979)

- Born: 9 September 1979 (age 47); Auckland, New Zealand
- Occupations: Professional boxer; Community worker
- Organization: Duco Events
- Notable work: Buttabean Motivation
- Spouse: Koreen Letele
- Children: 4
- Boxing career
- Nickname: Brown Buttabean
- Height: 6 ft 3 in (1.91 m)
- Weight: Heavyweight
- Reach: 76 in (193 cm)
- Stance: Orthodox

Boxing record
- Total fights: 20
- Wins: 16
- Win by KO: 6
- Losses: 4
- Draws: 0
- Website: buttabeanmotivation.co.nz

David Letele (born 9 September 1979), also known as the Brown Buttabean, is a New Zealand social activist and retired professional boxer and rugby league footballer from Auckland. After retiring, Letele became a motivational speaker. He created his own fitness gym with no equipment, giving out free meals for the homeless and runs a foodbank for people in need.

== Rugby league ==
Letele played rugby league at an early age, establishing himself very quickly. At the age of 16, Letele was already training with the Māori representative New Zealand team. However, Letele was not able to see the field due to shattering his knee in training.

Letele was signed onto the New Zealand A team, attracting the National Rugby League (NRL) team the New Zealand Warriors. However, due to knee problems, he was sidelined again.

Letele signed on to play for the minor premiership team, North Sydney Bears. While with the Bears, the team won three titles. Letele has also played for Cootamundra Bulldogs and AS Carcassonne in France before retiring.

== Boxing ==
Letele was a corporate boxer fighting multiple times on Duco Events’ card before turning pro. He has his nobility as a professional boxer, public figure and has made innovative contributions to a field of entertainment as he puts on a character when he is in the ring with a mic, in the media or at the weigh in as the Brown Buttabean. His alias the "Brown Buttabean" is inspired by Eric Esch's Butterbean. Letele has received mixed reactions from the media and the general public, calling him Duco's circus act.

Duco Events created their own title, which is an exact replica from the Rocky film series. With this title Letele puts out an open challenge to the locals to fight him at 4x2 minute rounds at a weight limit of 100 kg. The added stipulation is that if Leteles opponent knocks him out, they will receive ten thousand dollars.

=== Corporate world Champion to professional fighter 2014–2015 ===
Letele won the title against John Lomu (who is the brother of Jonah Lomu) on 16 October 2014. Letele won by TKO in the second round. Letele lost the first fight but defended his title for the second time against Waikato Rugby Union Prop Loni Uhila on 6 December 2014. Letele won by split decision. The NZPBA recognise Letele's fights from this point onwards as professional fights and not corporate fights, although the rules stayed at corporate rules. In March 2015, fought on the Cairo George vs Nort Beauchamp undercard against Tamati Keefe. The bout was for the inaugural King of the Coromandel Heavyweight boxing title. Letele won the bout by Unanimous decision.

On 4 March 2015, the day before his fight against Finau Maka at the weigh in, both fighters got into a fight. Letele grabbed Maka on the throat pushing him back, Maka retaliated by tackling him to the ground, however the fight was broken off quickly. Letele defended the title for the third time against former Tonga national rugby union team star Finau Maka on 5 March 2015. Letele won by TKO in the first round. In July 2015, WBA Oceania ranked Letele in their regional ratings. Letele defended his title for the fourth and fifth time by fighting two people on the same night. This was the only time NZPBA did not recognize Letele's fights as pro bouts since fighting Loni Uhila. The NZPBA did not recognizes the two bouts as pro due to both bouts didn't make minimum scheduled time limit of either 4x2 minute rounds or 3x3 minute rounds. Both of the bouts were scheduled for 3x2 minute rounds. Letele fought the winner of the Christchurch Corporate Boxing Tournament Jae Jae Smith and local Lordly Kaihua. Letele won both bouts in the third round by TKO.

=== First defeat with redemption 2015 ===
Letele defended his title for the sixth and final time on 1 August 2015 against former Southland Rugby Football Union player Kaleni Taetuli. Letele lost the bout in 22-second in the first round by TKO. In 2015, Letele moved to a new gym and trainer, trained by John Conway. On 14 October 2015, the day before his second fight against Kaleni Taetuli at the weigh in, Letele lashed out and tried to attack Taetuli while screaming out "You won the lottery last time". Leteles team grabbed him before he could get his hands on Taetuli. Kaleni Taetuli defended the title against Letele on 15 October. If Taetuli won by knockout, he would have received fifteen thousand dollars instead of the usual ten thousand dollar stipulation. It has been reported that win, lose or draw this will be Taetuli's last fight. Letele won the fight by majority decision.

=== Second Defeat, Redemption to retirement 2015–2016 ===
Letele defended his regained title against Loni Uhila in a rematch, one year after their first bout. Uhila won against Letele by UD, making this the second loss in Letele's boxing career. Since their last fight Uhila has signed on to Hurricanes (rugby union). In January 2016, Letele fought Silivelio Pekepo aka Batman in Samoa. This was the first time that Letele has fought in Samoa. Pekepo called Letele out back in 2015 when Letele fought two boxers in one night, however Letele fought someone else. Letele declared the bout to be for the Duco Event's USA Heavyweight title and the Duco Event's Intercontinental Heavyweight title. Letele won the bout against Pekepo by Unanimous decision. In April 2016, Letele fought in Australia for the second time. This time he fought for what was called the vacant Duco Event's Corporate World Australia Title. Letele fought Australian Kickboxer Wayne Pepe. Letele won by TKO in the first round. In May 2016, Letele fought in more of a traditional bout then he is usually use to. Letele fought Conrad Lam at 4x3 min rounds with no standing 8 counts. Conrad Lam won the bout by split decision. Letele will be fighting against JaeJae Smith for the second time. The last the two fought was in Palmerston North back in June 2015, where Letele fought two people in one night. Letele won both fights by TKO. Letele fought Barlow twice in his career, first in Waitara, New Zealand as the main event in October 2016. Second time they fought was on the Joseph Parker vs. Andy Ruiz undercard. The fight was not televised, however it was the opener of the event. This fight was Letele's retirement fight.

== Boxing records ==
=== Exhibition ===
Opponent	Date	Location	Notes
(New Zealand) Shaun Rankin	2017-04-15	Napier, New Zealand	Rankin promoted the event as well as fought in the main event against Letele.

=== Corporate ===
5 fights	5 wins	0 losses
By knockout	3	0
By decision	2	0
Draws	0	

Res.	Record	Opponent	Type	Rd., Time	Date	Location	Notes
Win	5–0	(New Zealand) George Hola	UD	4	2016-07-01	(New Zealand) ASB Stadium, Auckland	
Win	4–0	(New Zealand) Lordly Kaihua	TKO	3 (3)	2015-06-13	(New Zealand) Arena Manawatu, Palmerston North, Manawatu	Retained Duco Event's Corporate World Heavyweight title.
Win	3–0	(New Zealand) JaeJae Smith	TKO	3 (3)	2015-06-13	(New Zealand) Arena Manawatu, Palmerston North, Manawatu	Retained Duco Event's Corporate World Heavyweight title.
Win	2–0	(New Zealand) John Lomu	TKO	2 (4)	2014-10-16	(New Zealand) Trusts Stadium, Henderson, Auckland	Won vacant Duco Event's Corporate World Heavyweight title.
Win	1–0	(New Zealand) Lopini Vatuvei	UD	4	2014-07-05	(New Zealand) Vodafone Events Centre, Manukau, Auckland	

=== Professional ===
20 fights	16 wins	4 losses
By knockout	7	2
By decision	9	2
Draws	0	

Res.	Record	Opponent	Type	Rd., Time	Date	Location	Notes
Lose	16–4	(New Zealand) Manu Vatuvei	TKO	1 (4), 0:28	2018-12-15	Horncastle Arena, Christchurch, New Zealand	
Win	16–3	(New Zealand) Luke Mealamu	UD	4	2017-02-11	Papatoetoe Rugby Football Club, Papatoetoe, New Zealand	
Win	15–3	(New Zealand) Che Barlow	TKO	4, (4)	2016-12-10	Vector Arena, Auckland, New Zealand	
Win	14–3	(New Zealand) Che Barlow	UD	4	2016-10-29	War Memorial Hall, Waitara, New Zealand	
Win	13–3	(New Zealand) Clarence Tillman	UD	4	2016-10-01	Vodafone Events Centre, Manukau City, New Zealand	
Win	12–3	(New Zealand) JaeJae Smith	TKO	4, (4)	2016-07-21	Horncastle Arena, Christchurch, New Zealand	
Lose	11–3	(New Zealand) Conrad Lam	UD	4	2016-05-21	Vodafone Events Centre, Manukau City, New Zealand	
Win	11–2	(Australia) Wayne Pepe	TKO	1, (4) 1:45	2016-04-27	Convention & Exhibition Centre, Brisbane, Australia	Won Duco Event's Corporate World Australian heavyweight title
Win	10–2	(New Zealand) Silivelio Pekepo	UD	4	2016-01-23	Faleata Sports Complex, Apia, Samoa	Won vacant Duco Event's Corporate USA and Duco Event's Corporate Intercontinental heavyweight titles
Lose	9–2	(New Zealand) Loni Uhila	UD	4	2015-12-05	Claudelands Arena, Hamilton, New Zealand	Lose Duco Event's Corporate World heavyweight title
Win	9–1	(New Zealand) Gavin Somers	TKO	2, (4) 1:38	2015-11-06	ABA Stadium, New Zealand	
Win	8–1	(New Zealand) Kaleni Taetuli	MD	4	2015-10-15	Trusts Stadium, Henderson, New Zealand	Won Duco Event's Corporate World heavyweight title
Loss	7–1	(New Zealand) Kaleni Taetuli	TKO	1, (4) 0:22	2015-08-01	Stadium Southland, Invercargill, New Zealand	Lost Duco Event's Corporate World heavyweight title
Win	7–0	(New Zealand) James Levao	TKO	3, (4)	2015-05-02	Queen Elizabeth Youth Centre, Tauranga, New Zealand	
Win	6–0	(New Zealand) Rob Manual	UD	4	2015-04-17	ABA Stadium, Auckland, New Zealand	
Win	5–0	(New Zealand) Tamati Keefe	UD	4	2015-03-21	War Memorial Civic Centre, Thames, New Zealand	Won vacant King of the Coromandel heavyweight title
Win	4–0	(New Zealand) Finau Maka	TKO	1, (4) 1:48	2015-03-05	Vodafone Events Centre, Manukau, New Zealand	Retained Duco Event's Corporate World heavyweight title
Win	3–0	(New Zealand) AyJay Su'a	SD	4	2014-12-13	ABA Stadium, Auckland, New Zealand	
Win	2–0	(New Zealand) Loni Uhila	SD	4	2014-12-06	(New Zealand) Claudelands Arena, Hamilton, Waikato	Retained Duco Event's Corporate World heavyweight title
Win	1–0	(Australia) Rhys Sullivan	TKO	4, (4)	2014-10-31	Logan Metro Sports Centre, Crestmead, Queensland, Australia	

=== Titles ===
Minor World Titles:

- (2) Duco Events Corporate World Heavyweight Champion (274 lbs)
- King of the Coromandel Heavyweight Champion (302 lbs)
- Duco Event's Corporate Intercontinental Heavyweight Champion (242½ lbs)
- Duco Event's Corporate USA Heavyweight Champion (242½ lbs)
- Duco Event's Corporate World Australia Heavyweight Champion (266 lbs)

== Post boxing ==
In December 2015, Letele announced his retirement from boxing at the end of 2016. Letele planned on opening his own, become a personal trainer and continue his Buttabean Motivation group. Despite announcing his retirement in December 2016 on the Joseph Parker vs. Andy Ruiz undercard, Letele made his one off in ring return in February 2017 and December 2018.

Letele was a contestant on the 2022 season of the dancing show Dancing with the Stars.

== Community involvement ==
=== BBM Motivation ===
Letele lost over 90 kg by April 2016. His weight loss inspired him to help others out by supporting and educating everyday people on their health and wellness journey. He subsequently launched a website called "buttabeanmotivation.co.nz" to promote his weight loss programme. Most people lose a minimum of 5 kg each and many have lost up to 50 kg which is over 25,000 kg combined. Buttabean Motivation helps people lose weight by doing weekly boot camps, dieting programs, support groups, fitness plans, community work and occasional school visits.

In June 2015, Letele announced that he had launched a new website to help motivate people on their weight-loss journey. In 2017, Brown Buttabean Motivation had reached 8000 members.

In November 2017, Letele received a special honour award at the Pacific People's Award at the Vodafone Events Centre, Manukau City, New Zealand. Letele was honoured for his contribution to the community in his battle against obesity in the Pacific community in New Zealand. After accepting the award he got the entire arena to stand up and do an impromptu boot camp.

In February 2019, Letele broke the world record for the number of people performing frog squats simultaneously at a boot camp event that he hosted at Eden Park. This happened on 24 February 2019 with 1711 participating in the event.

Due to his work in combatting obesity through his community organisation Buttabean Motivation (BBM), Letele won the 2022 Kiwibank New Zealand Local Hero of the Year.

=== Food banks and other initiatives ===
Letele also runs several community projects in Auckland including a foodbank in Wiri, South Auckland called "BBM Foodshare," community gyms in west and South Auckland, a community kitchen in Manukau and a "social supermarket" in Tokoroa. In mid-March 2024, a government funding shortfall forced BBM Foodshare to limits its free food parcel service to 200 families. In 2023, BBM Foodshare had previously received NZ$90,000 in funding from the Ministry of Social Development as well as corporate support from Meat the Need, Foodstuffs, Sanitarium and NZ Food Network. At its peak, BBM Foodshare supported 700 families, hired three staff members and had an operating budget of NZ$1 million. On 18 March, BBM Motivation signed a multi-year agreement with Z Energy to help Letele's community organisation cover its operating costs and fuel expenses, allowing BBM Foodshare's food parcel operations to resume. Letele welcomed the news, saying "it takes a huge weight off my shoulders. It's less focus on hustling for funding and more focus on the actual work."

In March 2024 BBM launched a new initiative called BBM Recruitment with the support of Rubbish Direct and Chevron Traffic Services to combat unemployment.

On 10 October 2024, Letele announced that he had decided to shut down the food bank, citing costs, lack of funding and "being mentally taxing" to keep the food bank afloat. In mid December 2024, Letele's foodbank was able to continue operating for the Christmas holidays after receiving generous donations from the telecommunications entrepreneur Annette Presley, the Church of Jesus Christ of Latter-Day Saints and an anonymous wealthy donor.

== Media career ==
In January 2022, MediaWorks New Zealand announced that Letele would join its new current affairs radio station Today FM. The station launched on 21 March 2022. In late March 2023, Today FM was abruptly taken off air by MediaWorks.

== Political views ==
=== 2023 general election ===
During the 2023 New Zealand general election, Letele maintained a cordial relationships with National Party leader Christopher Luxon, attending party fundraisers and exchanging friendly text messages. Luxon also supported Letele after his community food bank was raided. Letele also befriended various figures on both sides of the New Zealand political spectrum in order to support his community outreach.

In late September 2023, Letele and 16 other Māori leaders issued an open letter to Luxon urging him to "condemn the racist comments made by New Zealand First, condemn the race-baiting policies of the ACT party, and commit himself to representing all of us, including Māori." In response, Luxon accused Labour Party leader and Prime Minister Chris Hipkins of creating a campaign built on fear and negativity. NZ First leader Winston Peters accused the letter writers of racism. In addition, ACT leader David Seymour accused the signatories of making false accusations of racism while ignoring the alleged racism of the Te Pāti Māori (TPM). In response to Seymour's remarks, TPM co-leader Debbie Ngarewa-Packer accused Seymour of suffering from White Saviourism and of taking no responsibility for his alleged ignorance. In turn, Hipkins accused Luxon of exploiting racial tensions. While Letele said that the letter writing incident damaged his relationship with Luxon, Luxon denied there was a rift between the two-man, stating that "I am a great admirer of Dave and his work. I have visited his facility and even helped pack boxes for his charity and donated personally to BBM."

Letele also considered running standing as the Te Pāti Māori candidate in Manurewa but opted not to stand. During an interview with RNZ journalist Guyon Espiner, Letele said that he would most like stand for TPM "only because they'd be the party to let me be me".

=== Youth crime and gangs ===
While Letele has likened youth boot camps to his BBM programme, he criticised the Sixth National Government's decision to place Oranga Tamariki (the Ministry for Children) in charge of the boot camps. He said:

"These kids are used to being treated like shit. So treating them like even more shit, treating them harshly, what's that going to do? They're used to it. But what they're not used to is love."

Letele has also criticised the National-led government's policies of banning gang patches and making gang membership a factor in determining criminal sentences, stating:

"you cannot imprison your way out of it. When you've got kids joining gangs, and being patched at nine years old, throwing someone in prison doesn't solve anything."

== Personal life ==
Letele is of Tongan and Samoan descent.

Letele became obese while he played professional rugby league in Australia and France. The heaviest he ever weighed was 210 kg. He has attributed his weight problems as stemming from suffering difficult, lonely times in Australia, during which he struggled financially.

On the morning of 21 February 2024, Letele took part in a children's charity fun run in lower Queen Street in Auckland with Green Party MP and fellow Samoan community leader Efeso Collins. Shortly before 9:30 NZDT, Collins collapsed outside Britomart Station; 30 to 40 minutes' worth of attempts by on-site paramedics to revive him failed. Letele took part in a vigil immediately after Collins' unexpected death, and later thanked the efforts of parademics and off-duty police officers to save Collins' life.
