= Gangs Act 2024 =

Act of Parliament in New Zealand

New Zealand Parliament
- Commenced: 23 September 2024

Legislative history
- Introduced by: Paul Goldsmith
- First reading: 7 March 2024
- Second reading: 30 July 2024
- Third reading: 19 September 2024

Related legislation
- Sentencing Amendment Act 2024, Prohibition of Gang Insignia in Government Premises Act 2013, Wanganui District Council (Prohibition of Gang Insignia) Act 2009
- Status: Current legislation

The Gangs Act 2024 is a statute of the New Zealand Parliament that strengthens police and court powers against criminal gangs, including banning gang insignia, creating dispersal powers to stop gangs gathering in public and non-consorting orders to stop gang members from consorting. It was introduced to Parliament by the Sixth National Government.

The Act was initially introduced as the Gangs Legislation Bill, and divided into the Gangs Act, with the companion Sentencing Amendment Act 2024 making gang membership an aggravating factor in sentencing. The Gangs Act and Sentencing Amendment Act passed their third reading on 19 September 2024.

== Background ==
In 2023, the New Zealand Parliament passed legislation empowering the New Zealand Police to disrupt criminal and gang activity by amending four laws: the Crimes Act 1961, Land and Transport Act 1998, Search and Surveillance Act 2012, and the Anti-Money Laundering and Countering Financing of Terrorism Act 2009. While campaigning during the lead-up to the 2023 New Zealand general election, National Party leader Christopher Luxon had criticised the Sixth Labour Government for the rapid growth in gang membership, which rose from 4,915 individuals on the National Gang List in April 2017 to 8,875 by April 2023.

The rise in gang membership had also been influenced by a surge in the deportation of New Zealand criminals from Australia under the Section 501 character test introduced by a 2014 amendment to the Migration Act 1958. According to Stuff, these deportees included several leading members of bikie gangs including the Comanchero and Mongols, who established new chapters in New Zealand. By early March 2022, 2,544 New Zealanders had been deported from Australia since 2015. According to Newshub, former 501 deportees accounted for more than 8,000 offences since 2015, including over 2,000 dishonesty convictions, 1,387 violent crime convictions, 861 drug and anti-social behaviour offences and 57 sexual crime offences. Both Police Commissioner Andrew Coster and Luxon attributed the rapid surge in gang membership and organised crime between 2018 and 2022 to repatriated 501 deportees.

On 14 February 2024, the Ministry of Justice released its regulatory impact statement on the Government's proposed Gang Legislation Bill. The Ministry expressed concerned that the legislation would make it more difficult to leave gangs or to desist from crime; undermine the relationship between gangs and government agencies including reducing prevention opportunities and social service delivery; undermine efforts to cultivate pro-social activity within gang communities; and made it harder for families experiencing domestic violence to seek help. The Ministry advocated that the Government continue the status quo of issuing gang conflict warrants, seizing vehicles being driven recklessly, seizing assets linked to organised crime and recruiting 500 new police officers.

On 25 February 2024, Police Minister Mark Mitchell and Justice Minister Paul Goldsmith announced that the Government would introduce a Gang Legislation Bill to ban gang insignia in public places, enable Police to disperse gang gatherings, allow Courts to ban gang members from communicating for at least three years, and giving greater weight to gang membership during sentencing. Mitchell also confirmed the ban on gang insignia would apply to funerals and tangi.

== Key provisions ==
The Gangs Act 2024 is an omnibus bill that seeks to reduce the harmful behaviours caused by criminal gangs and to disincentivise gang membership. It makes displaying gang patches a criminal offence, creates new dispersal powers to stop gang members for gathering in a public area for seven days and create a new non-consorting order which bans specified gang offenders from consorting with each other for a period of three years.

The Bill's definition of gang is based on section 4 of the Prohibition of Gang Insignia in Government Premises Act 2013 while its definition of gang members is based on section 18A of the Search and Surveillance Act 2012. The Bill also gives Police constables the power to issue dispersal notices and the District Courts the power to issue non-consorting orders against gang offenders.

While an earlier draft of the Gang Legislation Bill also specified gang membership as an aggravating factor in sentencing, Part 5 was moved on 8 August 2024 to the separate Sentencing Amendment Act 2024.

== Legislative history ==
=== First reading ===
The Gang Legislation Bill passed its first reading on 7 March 2024 by a margin of 102 to 21 votes. While the governing National, ACT, New Zealand First parties and the opposition Labour Party supported the bill, it was opposed by the Green and Māori parties. The bill's sponsor National MP Paul Goldsmith, ACT MP Todd Stephenson, NZ First MP Jamie Arbuckle and National MP James Meager argued that the Bill would combat the negative impact of gangs and restore law and order in New Zealand. Labour MPs Duncan Webb, Ginny Andersen and Helen White agreed that gangs were a problem but said that the legislation needed work at the select committee level to address inequality and human rights issues. Green MP Tamatha Paul and Te Pāti Māori MP Rawiri Waititi opposed the Gangs Legislation Bill on the grounds that it would continue to fuel the mass incarceration and discriminate against Māori people.

On 7 March 2024 Attorney-General Judith Collins expressed concern that the proposed gang patch ban and the power to issue dispersal notices were inconsistent with the New Zealand Bill of Rights Act 1990's rights to freedom of expression, association, and peaceful assembly. Goldsmith admitted that the law breached the human rights of gang members but that their rights could be "justifiably limited" to "achieve a social benefit such as the prevention of crime."

=== Select committee stage ===
Submissions to the justice select committee were held between 8 March and 5 April 2024. The bill committee received 164 submissions from interested groups and individuals, including 32 oral submissions. The Ministry of Justice, New Zealand Police, Office of the Clerk and the Parliamentary Counsel Office assisted with the drafting of the bill. The committee also considered Attorney-General Collins' report on the Gangs Legislation Bill and Yulian Varbanov's petition to ban several gangs including the Head Hunters Motorcycle Club, Hells Angels, New Zealand Nomads, and Filthy Few.

The New Zealand Council of Civil Liberties's submission opposed the Gangs Legislation Bill on the grounds that it infringed on several civil liberties including freedom of expression, freedom of association and freedom of peaceful assembly. It also expressed concerns that it would give greater powers to governments and police to suppress individual liberties under the pretext of combating crime. The Free Speech Union's (FSU) chief executive Jonathan Ayling expressed concern that the bill would affect Māori disproportionately. He recommended several changes including narrowing the definition of gangs, that the Attorney-General approve additions to the list of gangs and a six-year sunset clause.

Chief Children's Commissioner Claire Achmad expressed concern that the Gangs Legislation would disproportionately affect Māori families, children and young people. The New Zealand Law Society's representative Chris Macklin expressed concern that the Bill would infringe on human rights and that it would not achieve its aims and goals. Similar concerns were expressed by Māori Law Society's representative Julia Spelman, who said that it would reinforce an "us versus them" mentality towards gangs in society. She also said that Māori were disproportionately targeted by the Police. Former Black Power gang member Eugene Ryder said that the Gang Legislation bill would only alienate gang members farther from society and urged the Government to address the causes of crime such as poverty, health and low social housing. Wellington lawyer Michael Bott said that the gang patch ban would make it harder for law enforcement authorities to track gangs and said that the Crimes Act 1961 and other legislation already included penalties for gang membership.

New Zealand Police Association president Chris Cahill gave cautious support to the bill but warned that it would be unrealistic for the public to expect Police personnel to tell gang members to remove their patches. Former Mayor of Whanganui and councillor Michael Laws argued that the Whanganui District Council's anti-patch by-law had led to a drop in gang membership and activity in that area.

In early July 2024, the justice select committee accepted six submissions from the New Zealand Law Society including removing the "support for a gang" component of the gang insignia definition; amended clause 7(1) to clarify the criteria for displaying gang insignia in a public place; clarified the term "disrupting other activities" in the context of gang dispersal notices; expanding the review grounds to allow the Police Commissioner to revoke a dispersal notice if they were satisfied that the individual is not a gang member; amending the timeframe for dispersal notice to take into account time-sensitive events such as funerals and tangihanga; and amending clause 19 to require personal service of the application for a non-consorting order. The bill was also amended to allow the Governor-General of New Zealand, at the advice of the Police Minister, to add or remove gangs from the list outlined in the Bill's Schedule 2.

The Labour Party's committee members issued a differing view that the bill was unworkable and diverted Police resources away from addressing the causes of crime. They expressed concern that issuing a dispersal notice verbally and via email was insufficient and could escalate conflict between Police and gang members. They also disagreed with making gang membership an aggravating factor in criminal sentencing. The Green Party's differing view said that the Bill would reverse progress made over several years to reduce the intimidating behaviour and organised crime by gangs. They also expressed concern that the gang patch ban would worsen conflict between Police and gang members while failing to address the causes of gangs. The Greens also expressed concern that the Police's increased dispersal and non-consorting powers would increased racism and the incarceration of Māori.

=== Second reading ===
On 30 July 2024, the Gangs Legislation Bill passed its second reading by a margin of 68 to 55 votes. While National, ACT and NZ First supported the bill, it was opposed by the Labour, Green parties, Te Pāti Māori and independent MP Darleen Tana.

=== Splitting and whole house committee ===
On 8 August, Climate Change Minister Simon Watts moved that the Gangs Legislation Bill be split into separate bills: the Gangs Bill and the Sentencing Amendment Bill. This passed by a margin of 68 to 55 votes along party lines.

In early August 2024, the Government amended the Gangs Bill to include a new gang insignia prohibition order (GIPO) regime which prohibits individuals subject to that regime from having gang insignia in their home. On 17 July 2024, the Ministry of Justice released its regulatory impact statement on the proposed new court order to prohibit possession of gang insignia. This amendment was added to the Bill after the select committee stage, preventing experts, interested parties and the public from scrutinising these changes. In response, the Law Society expressed concern that Amendment Paper 51 breached the right to freedom of expression under the New Zealand Bill of Rights Act 1990; would have an adverse impact on family, whanau and other individuals; and could lead to abuses of power by Police for purposes other than searches related to criminal investigations. The Law Society recommended that the Government not implement the amendment. In response to criticism, Police Minister Mark Mitchell said that the amendment would act as a deterrent to gang members "flouting the law" while Justice Minister Goldsmith said that Police would use their guidelines and training to "appropriately execute searches under the law."

On 17 September 2024, The New Zealand Herald reported that the Government had introduced a second last-minute amendment to the Gangs Bill to ensure that gang members did not circumvent the ban on gang insignia by displaying gang patches on their car windows. The change would amend the definition of "public place" to include gang insignia displayed inside a private vehicle which is visible to the public. Goldsmith said that Parliament had decided to clarify that cars were covered by the ban. Mitchell defended the second last-minute amendment as part of the Government's efforts to reduce the public intimidation caused by gangs.

=== Third reading ===
The Gangs and Sentencing Amendment Bills passed their third reading on 19 September 2024 by a margin of 68 to 55 votes. While the governing National, ACT and NZ First parties supported the bills, they were opposed by Labour, the Green parties and Te Pāti Māori. Government MPs Goldsmith, Mark Cameron, Jamie Arbuckle, James Meager, Cameron Brewer and Rima Nakhle argued that these two new bills would curb gang activities and improve public safety. Opposition MPs Duncan Webb, Tamatha Paul, Takutai Tarsh Kemp, Steve Abel, Willie Jackson. Tracey McLellan and Ginny Andersen argued that the two new bills failed to address the causes of crime and gang membership and discriminated against Māori. The Gangs Act 2024 received royal assent on 23 September.

== Implementation ==
On 21 November, the Gangs Act 2024's provisions including the ban on gang patches comes into force. Within the first 24 hours that the law came into effect, Police arrested between 11 and 12 individuals for violating the gang patch ban. The first individual arrested under the law was a Mongrel Mob member in Napier who displayed a gang sign on his dashboard. The sign was also confiscated. Another notable arrest was that of the president of the Head Hunters Motorcycle Club's West chapter, who also had his gang patch and motorcycle seized.

By 24 February 2025, Police confirmed they had seized 76 gang patches, 67 firearms and laid 337 charges for alleged insignia breaches under the Gangs Act 2024.

== Reactions ==
By August 2025, the Labour Party had officially adopted a policy of not seeking to repeal the ban on gang patches. In mid-August 2025, Labour MP Peeni Henare expressed support for repealing the gang patch ban during a candidates debate for the 2025 Tāmaki Makaurau by-election. Labour leader Chris Hipkins and deputy leader Carmel Sepuloni subsequently stated that Henare's remarks did not represent the party's official policy. In response, National Party MP and Justice Minister Paul Goldsmith questioned whether Labour would commit to its promise not to repeal the gang patch ban.

During the 2026 New Zealand general election in a debate, Labour leader Chris Hipkins confirmed Labour would keep the gang patch ban.

In early March 2025, lawyer Chris Nicholls challenged the conviction of Nomad gang member Mana-Apiti Brown under the Gangs Act 2024, likening the gang patch ban to Nazi Germany and the Taliban.

In July 2025, Mongrel Mob member Syd Te Rata sought the return of his gang patch, which has been seized by Police under the Gangs Act on 19 April 2025. In mid-September 2025, Lower Hutt District Court Justice Bruce Davidson ruled in favour of Te Rata's legal challenge and ordered the return of his gang patch.

In mid-June 2026, High Court Justice Andrew Becroft overturned two earlier decisions by Justices Lance Rowe and Joanne Wickliffe ordering Police to return gang patches to two gang members. The Solicitor-General of New Zealand had appealed both these rulings to the High Court, asking the latter to overturn these rulings. Police director of resolutions Sarah McKenzie welcomed Becroft's ruling as a precedent for future cases challenging the Police confiscation of gang patches.

In late July 2026, the Wellington High Court ruled that a Wellington man's conviction in December 2024 for displaying gang insignia infringed upon the New Zealand Bill of Rights Act 1990. The man was represented by lawyer Chris Nicholls, who said that the ruling could trigger a review of the gang patch ban by the Government if the decision was not appealed. In response, Justice Minister Goldsmith defended the Government's gang patch ban and said that the law would not be changing.
