= Tribesmen Motorcycle Club =

New Zealand motorcycle gang

Tribesmen
- Tribesmen MC Logo with Life Member Rocker
- Founded: 1980
- Founding location: Murupara
- Years active: 1980–present
- Territory: Ōtara, Northland, Rotorua, Murupara, Christchurch
- Ethnicity: Māori
- Criminal activities: Drug dealing, assault
- Allies: Bad Troublesome Ward, New Zealand Nomads, Black Power
- Rivals: Mongrel Mob, Hells Angels

The Tribesmen are a prominent outlaw motorcycle club based in the North Island of New Zealand. They have a relatively large presence, having set up chapters in Ōtara, Northland, Rotorua, Murupara and Christchurch.

There were 108 members imprisoned in 2015.

As of 2020, the Tribesmen MC are considered the dominant organisation in the gang scene in Christchurch.

== History ==
The Tribesmen Motorcycle Club was formed in 1980 in the Bay of Plenty township of Murupara. They have chapters nationwide and are easily recognised by their yellow colours and middle finger salute. The Tribesmen former feeder gang the Killer Beez, also wear yellow as a visual representation of their identity and acknowledge each other with the middle finger salute.

The Tribesmen MC were one of the first organised groups to import manufacture methamphetamine in New Zealand; however, the group lost their high standing among the organised groups in New Zealand due to their overindulgence in their own product. Due to this, they lost all respect from their peers, and therefore all power they held, eventually becoming known as the "Friedmen" among New Zealand organised crime syndicates.

In 2011, the newly established Rebels Motorcycle Club New Zealand Chapter voiced its intentions to "patch over" the Tribesmen Motorcycle Club. It is unknown how many Tribesmen members "patched over" to the Rebels; however, the Rebels used familial links to attempt to persuade Tribesmen members to join over to the Rebels. Peter Hunt, President of the Tribesmen in Murupara responded to these claims by stating that there was no mass "patching over" and that its simply a few Tribesmen members who have strong familial links to Rebels members in Australia making the change over.

During the 2020 coronavirus pandemic, the New Zealand Police used the lockdown periods in New Zealand to undertake investigations and to target the organised crime syndicates in New Zealand. During these investigations, the Tribesmen MC were among the groups targeted and raided. During the period, the New Zealand Police executed 100 search warrants which led to the seizure of 43 firearms, 25 kilograms of methamphetamine, more than 30 kilograms of marijuana, and smaller amounts of various other illicit substances. The police did not specify if any items were seized by any specific groups.

=== Killer Beez ===
The Killer Beez were founded in 2003 by then-Vice President of the Tribesmen New Zealand, Josh Masters, as a feeder gang for the Tribesmen. The main purpose of the Killer Beez was to build soldiers for the Tribesmen Motorcycle Club. Most Killer Beez would eventually become fully fledged members of the Tribesmen ranks.

The relationship between Tribesmen and Killer Beez deteriorated in 2019 with the shooting of Killer Beez president Josh Masters, and resulted in multiple outbreaks of gunfire in Auckland and Kaitaia in 2022.

== Leaders ==
=== Current ===
- Peter Hunt - President - Tribesmen Murupara
- Elder Browne - President - Tribesmen Christchurch

=== Former ===
- Josh Masters - Former Vice President - Tribesmen New Zealand. Stripped of position in 2008.
- Jay Hepi - Former President - Tribesmen Far North. Patched over to the Rebels MC, eventually rises to presidency of the Rebels club.

== Incidents ==
- In February 2016, a Tribesmen Ōtara prospect, Clayton Ratima, was beaten to death by two Tribesmen Ōtara patched members, Dennis Solomon and Vincent George. Ratima was reportedly standing guard at the gangs Ōtara pad, when the pair coerced Ratima to fight another associate. When Ratima and the associate agreed, but did not land any blows, the pair began to attack Ratima. Ratima sustained two fractures to his neck, and a swollen brain and would die not long after being seen by medical personnel, more than 7 hours after the attack occurred. Solomon and George received 10 year sentences each for their roles in the attack.
- In June 2018, a Police raid on a property "with strong links to the Tribesmen Motorcycle gang" in Cashmere, Christchurch led to the arrest of two Tribesmen members. Police located methamphetamine in "dealing quantities", along with scales. A cannabis growing operation was also located on the property, along with "thousands of dollars" in cash amounts. Two people were arrested and charged with possession of methamphetamine for supply, cultivating cannabis, and possession of cannabis.
- On April 26, 2019, a Tribesmen Ōtara, and former Killer Beez, patch member Akustino Tae shot and paralyzed former friend, and former Tribesmen and Killer Beez leader, Josh Masters with a pistol at a motorcycle dealership in Auckland. Akustino was charged with attempted murder; however, due to the coronavirus pandemic, the crown accepted a plea deal with Tae to take a lesser charge in order to speed up the trial process, and to limit the amount of money spent on a trial. Tae pleaded guilty to wounding with intent to cause grievous bodily harm, which carries a maximum sentence of 14 years imprisonment.
- In July 2020, 10 members of the Tribesmen Christchurch confronted a small group of Mongrel Mob members outside of the Christchurch District Court. This confrontation led to a fight occurring, during which a Mongrel Mob member's head was stomped on multiple times. The fight was broken up by Court Security officers.
- In August 2020, 12 members of the Tribesmen Christchurch were arrested after the Police conducted raids regarding the gangs involvement in a fight outside the Christchurch District Court in July 2020. Of the 12 arrested, 10 were arrested on charges linked to the brawl; however, during the raids, the Police uncovered over $15,000 in cash and drugs, leading to another 2 associates of the gang being arrested too.
- In November 2020, a Tribesmen member, Merc Maumasi-Rihari, crashed and died at the scene in North Canterbury after his bike collided with a car. Maumasi-Rihari was riding in a convoy of around 70 Tribesmen members, on their way back to the North Island after attending a national gathering and Patching ceremony in Christchurch where Maumasi-Rihari had just been patched in to the Tribesmen Motorcycle Club.
- In May 2022, conflicts between the Tribesmen and Killer Beez led to shootings in South Auckland. Seven shootings occurred in the suburbs of Ōtara, Papatoetoe, Flat Bush, Papakura, Te Atatū South, Henderson and Mount Albert on the night of the 24th, with two more on the 25th. A week later, on the night of 3 June, another Beach Haven house belonging to a Tribesmen gang member was shot at.
- In 2023 a two-year police investigation into a drug network and money laundering operation led to the arrest of several Tribesman members and associates. Nine were convicted, and received jail sentences of over 50 years between them.

== See also ==
- Black Power
- Mongrel Mob
