= William Katipa =

New Zealand criminal

William Wii Katipa is a New Zealand rapist, prison escapee and Black Power gang member currently serving two preventative detention sentences, one for rape on the outside and one for prison rape.

Katipa was raised as "the son of drug addicts who himself seemed constantly stoned." In 1991, he was sentenced to prison for armed robbery.

In 1994 he raped a woman after entering her house when her husband left for early-morning work. He was not caught at the time, but DNA evidence was collected. He was convicted of raping a 13-year-old in 2002 (again through an unlocked door), after which the DNA from the 1994 rape was matched to him and he pled guilty to rape and burglary.

In 2009, Katipa and another prisoner staged an escape attempt from Waikeria Prison. Katipa lasted less than 48 hours on the outside before recapture.

In 2006 a complaint of prison rape was made against Katipa, but it did not progress due to lack of evidence. In 2015 a separate compliant lead to a third complaint being made. After a widely watched trial, Katipa was convicted of 14 charges against the three complainants.

Katipa's actions and those of Stephen Mark Gotty, a rapist with more than 145 convictions, led to a review of the double-bunking policy by the Corrections Department.
