= Lauren O'Reilly =

Lauren O'Reilly may refer to:

- Lauren O'Reilly (volleyball)
- Lauren O'Reilly (rugby union)
