= New Zealand Jewish Council =

New Zealand Jewish organisation

- Founded: 1981; 45 years ago
- Headquarters: Auckland, New Zealand
- Region served: New Zealand
- President: Juliet Moses
- Website: nzjc.org.nz

The New Zealand Jewish Council (NZJC) is a Jewish communal organisation in New Zealand. Aided by regional Jewish councils, it was established in 1981 to respond to antisemitism in New Zealand and misinformation. The council also monitors and responds to the New Zealand government's foreign policy and attitudes towards the State of Israel and the Middle East. It acts as a representative body of Jewish communities in New Zealand, claiming to represent 10,000 Jews across the country. It is an affiliate of the World Jewish Congress.

== History ==
The council was established in Wellington in 1981 at a national conference of Jewish leaders from across New Zealand. Wally Hirsh was appointed as the inaugural chairman of the council. The Israeli ambassador, Yaacov Morris, also attended and spoke at the conference. Also present was Israeli-Australian Jewish activist Isi Leibler, who had been working with local Jewish leadership to form the organisation.

In 1991, the Council supported the government's investigation into whether suspected Nazi war criminals were living clandestinely in New Zealand. In 2010, the Council criticised a government ban on Shechita (Kosher animal slaughter), arguing that "denying us a fundamental tenant of our religion is a direct challenge to our existence. It is unintentional anti-Semitism."

In July 2021, the council's spokesperson Juliet Moses criticised Mongrel Mob member Harry Tam for chanting the Nazi victory salute "Sieg Heil" in a video. Moses described the video as offensive to New Zealand Jews particularly Holocaust survivors.

In March 2022, the Council published the Survey of Antisemitism in New Zealand in 2021. Since the 2023 Hamas-led attack on Israel, the council has criticised civic and political leaders for not denouncing what it called antisemitic rhetoric at pro-Palestinian demonstrations in New Zealand.

== See also ==
- History of the Jews in New Zealand
