= Finau Maka =

Tonga international rugby union player

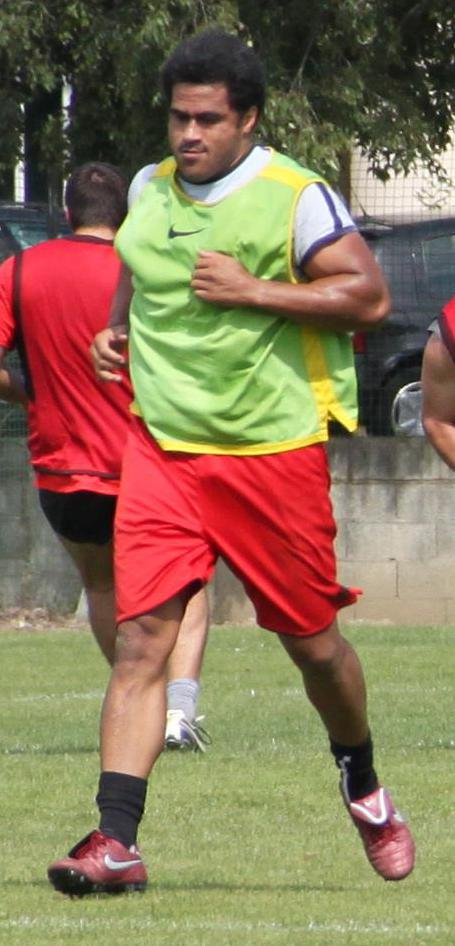
- Finau Maka, Daan Human and Yann David at Stade toulousain training
- Born: Finau Sosefo Maka; 10 July 1977 (age 49) Longoteme, Tonga
- Height: 6 ft 2 in (1.88 m)
- Weight: 242 lb (110 kg)
- School: Sacred Heart College Auckland
- Notable relative: Isitolo Maka (brother)

Rugby union career
- Position(s): Flanker, Number 8
Amateur team(s)
Years	Team	Apps	(Points)
1994-95	New Zealand Schools		
1996	NZ U19		
1997-98	NZ U21		
1996-2001	Ponsonby Rugby Club		
Senior career
Years	Team	Apps	(Points)
1997-2001	Auckland Rugby Union	58	(25)
2001–2010	Toulouse	195	(85)
2010-2011	Provence Rugby	18	(5)
Super Rugby
Years	Team	Apps	(Points)
1997–98	Hurricanes	12	(15)
1999–00	Blues	13	(5)
2001	Highlanders	9	(10)
International career
Years	Team	Apps	(Points)
2007–11	Tonga	8	(5)
2008	Pacific Islanders	1	(0)
Coaching career
- Years: Team
- 2017-2018: Dilworth XV Forward Coach
- 2019: G-TEC Development Forward Coach
- 2020-2022: Eden Premier Ast Coach

Finau Maka (born 10 July 1977) started his playing career for Auckland Rugby Union and NZ age group teams. He played over 50 games for Auckland NPC Team and the Hurricanes, Blues and Highlanders before leaving to play for the Stade Toulousain club in French Top 14. Whilst at Toulouse he helped them win the 2003, 2005 and 2010 Heineken Cups, as a replacement in 2003 and starting in the 2005 final. He played in two Rugby World Cups for Tonga and was one of the stars of the 2007 Rugby World Cup. In 2011 he led his country to beat France in the biggest upset in Rugby World Cup history. France went on to almost beat the All Blacks in the final.

In December 2012 he was convicted in France of slavery after forcing a migrant worker to live in a shed and work in conditions that equated to slavery.

== Rugby ==
Maka made his international debut in the 2007 Rugby World Cup, in Tonga's first pool game against the United States of America. He opened the scoring with a try in the second minute.

In 2008 he was selected for the pacific islanders' tour of Europe.

In 2011 he captained Tonga's world cup squad.

== Boxing ==
In 2014, Maka fought against David Letele for the Duco Event's Corporate World Title. The day before the fight at the weigh in both fighters got into a fight. Letele grabbed Maka on the throat pushing him back, Maka retaliated by tackling him to the ground, however the fight was broken off quickly. Maka lost by TKO in the first round.

== Professional boxing record ==
0 Wins (0 knockouts, 0 decisions), 1 Losses (1 knockouts, 0 decisions), 0 Draws
Res.	Record	Opponent	Type	Rd., Time	Date	Location	Notes
Loss	0–1	(New Zealand) David Letele	TKO	1, (4) 1:48	2015-03-05	(New Zealand) Vodafone Events Centre, Manukau City, Auckland	Duco Event's Corporate World Title
