= Sentencing Amendment Act 2024 =

Act of Parliament in New Zealand

Sentencing Amendment ACT 2024

New Zealand Parliament
- Royal assent: 23 September 2024

Legislative history
- Introduced by: Paul Goldsmith
- First reading: 7 March 2024
- Second reading: 30 July 2024
- Third reading: 19 September 2024

Related legislation
- Sentencing Act 2002, Gangs Act 2024
- Status: Current legislation

The Sentencing Amendment Act 2024 is a New Zealand Act of Parliament which amends the Sentencing Act 2002 to make membership of criminal gangs an aggravating factor in sentencing. The Act was split from the Sixth National Government's Gangs Legislation Bill on 8 August 2024, with the companion Gangs Act 2024 banning gang insignia and creating new anti-gang dispersal and non-consorting orders. The two laws passed their third reading on 19 September 2024.

== Background ==
On 25 February 2024, Police Minister Mark Mitchell and Justice Minister Paul Goldsmith announced that the National-led coalition government would introduce a Gang Legislation Bill to ban gang insignia in public places, enable Police to disperse gang gatherings, allow Courts to ban gang members from communicating for at least three years, and give greater weight to gang membership during sentencing.

== Provisions ==
The Bill amends Section 9 of the Sentencing Act 2002 to outline the aggravating and mitigating factors a court must take into account when sentencing or dealing with an offender who is member of a criminal gang. The amendment replaces the aggravating factor outlined in section 9(1) (hb) with a new provision that removes the requirement for the court to establish the nature and extent of any connection between the offender and the offender's participation in an organised criminal group (as defined by Section 98A of the Crimes Act 1961) to ensure there are no undue limits on the consideration of a person's gang membership as an aggravating factor in sentencing.

== Legislative history ==
Until 8 August 2024, the Bill was Part 5 of the Gangs Legislation Bill. The Gangs Legislation Bill had passed its first reading on 7 March 2024 along party lines. While the National, ACT and New Zealand First parties supported the bill, it was opposed by the Labour, Green and Māori parties. During the select committee hearings, Wellington lawyer Michael Bott questioned the necessity of the Bill's gang membership sentencing provisions since the Crimes Act 1961 and other legislation already had penalties for gang membership.

The Gangs Legislation Bill passed its second reading on 30 July 2024 along party lines. On 6 August, Labour MP Duncan Webb proposed an amendment to tighten the criteria for judges to impose mandatory sentences related to gang membership. On 8 August, Parliament voted along party lines to reject Webb's proposed amendment. That same day, Climate Change Minister Simon Watts successfully moved that the Gangs Legislation Bill be split into separate bills: the Gangs Bill and the Sentencing Amendment Bill.

Sentencing Amendment and Gangs Bills passed their third reading on 19 September 2024 by a margin of 68 to 55 votes along party lines. Government MPs Paul Goldsmith, Mark Cameron, Jamie Arbuckle, James Meager, Cameron Brewer and Rima Nakhle argued that these two new bills would curb gang activities and intimidation and improve public safety. Opposition MPs Duncan Webb, Tamatha Paul, Takutai Tarsh Kemp, Steve Abel, Willie Jackson. Tracey McLellan and Ginny Andersen argued that the two new bills failed to address the causes of crime and gang membership, and discriminated against Māori. The Sentencing Amendment Act 2024 received royal assent on 23 September.
