= Antisemitism in New Zealand =

Antisemitism in New Zealand is the manifestation of hostility, prejudice or discrimination against the New Zealand Jewish people or Judaism as a religious, ethnic or racial group. This form of racism has affected Jews since New Zealand's Jewish community was established in the 19th century. Notable individuals involved in anti-Jewish agitation have been studied by researchers.

According to the New Zealand Jewish Council, "Overt acts of antisemitism have been largely absent in New Zealand." In 2026, reports emerged on personal targeting of Jewish community leaders. According to the New Zealand Human Rights Commission, antisemitic behaviour online includes use of longstanding antisemitic tropes.

== 19th century ==
Although Julius Vogel became the country's first Jewish premier in 1873, immigration policy instituted in 1881 curtailed Jewish immigration. Immigration was effectively closed to cultures deemed too foreign (a category which also included eastern European Jews) and that were of non-British origin. Some have attributed this attitude to New Zealand's geographic isolation at the time, to fear of economic competition, to the dilution of a perceived "white" culture.

== 20th century ==
Antisemitism and discrimination increased during the Second World War, with Jews excluded from professions and immigration. The immigration policy continued to favour migrants of British-origin while excluding Jews and Asians. 1100 Jewish refugees fleeing Nazi persecution were given refuge in New Zealand, while thousands of other Jewish applicants were rejected. The refugees that entered before and after the war encountered prejudice from a mostly homogeneous non-Maori New Zealand society. The trade union movement in the country was ambivalent towards Jewish refugees, with the New Zealand Federation of Labour preferring non-Jewish victims of fascism. Some local academics and the Christchurch Refugees Emergency Committee supported Jewish immigration. Christian churches in New Zealand were mostly ambivalent towards the settlement of Jewish refugees, with only the Religious Society of Friends attempting to influence government immigration policy and then assisting the refugees that were permitted entry. After the war, the government mostly rejected immigration applications from foreign relatives of New Zealand Jewry and those of the newly arrived refugees. This was in contrast to Australian policy that stressed its humanitarian obligations.

In 1977, the New Zealand Jewish community was targeted by a leaflet drop in the Auckland suburb of Remuera. The National Socialist Party of New Zealand was responsible for producing and disseminating 9000 copies of the pamphlet. It contained images of Jesus Christ, Adolf Hitler and it condemned Judaism, likening Jews to the devil. Colin King-Ansell, leader of the party, was convicted, leading to New Zealand's first ever conviction for hate speech.

In 1990, a woman with a history of psychiatric illness, reportedly screamed antisemitic epithets before carrying out a knife attack on four Jewish children. Two months earlier, in an apparent copycat attack of the desecration of Jewish graves in Carpentras, Jewish graves were desecrated in Dunedin.

== 21st century ==
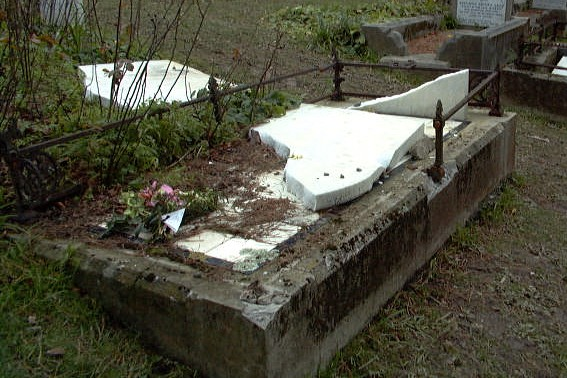
Solomon Levy's vandalized grave, Wellington, New Zealand

In 2004, scores of Jewish graves, including 1840s settler Solomon Levy's, were smashed and spray painted with swastikas and other antisemitic messages at Wellington. The New Zealand Parliament responded rapidly to condemn the actions. A 2007 book, Worlds Apart by Jewish academics Colin Tatz, Peter Arnold and Gillian Heller arrived at the "reasonable conclusion" upon studying evidence that in New Zealand there is “chronic, endemic anti-Semitism in the academe and its intellectual world.”

In 2012, a Jewish cemetery in Auckland was desecrated overnight with swastikas and antisemitic statements scrawled across the grave stones. More than 20 graves were attacked at the Karangahape Road cemetery. The perpetrator, a young Englishman on holiday in New Zealand, was convicted and ordered to leave the country. In 2015, Jewish graves were again desecrated in Dunedin, with two broken and another vandalised with a swastika.

In 2022, the New Zealand Jewish Council (NZJC) published a major survey of antisemitism in New Zealand, focusing attention on several areas of concern. The survey found concerning levels of antisemitic sentiment, with various forms of antisemitism identified, including classical antisemitism, right-wing and nationalistic antisemitism, jihad-inspired antisemitism, and left-wing antisemitism (Zionophobia).

Despite negative views, the study suggested a high level of warmth toward Jews in New Zealand, with a surprising 32% stating they knew a Jewish person. However, Holocaust knowledge remains a concern, as only 42% could correctly identify the number of Jewish people killed in the Holocaust. The survey emphasizes the importance of Holocaust education in New Zealand.

=== New antisemitism ===
See, Antisemitism during the Gaza war

According to the local human rights group, Humanity Matters, over half of Jews in New Zealand reported in 2022 that they had encountered antisemitic misinformation or disinformation online that was either directly related to Israel or to anti-Zionism during the previous 12 months.

The October 7 attacks and subsequent Gaza war saw a rise in antisemitic sentiment in New Zealand as well, with Jewish community members and experts warning of real-life repercussions. Following safety concerns from the New Zealand Police, Jewish-affiliated institutions such as the Holocaust Centre of New Zealand as well as schools and synagogues were temporarily closed for fear of attacks. Jewish people in New Zealand reported a sudden uptick of antisemitic slurs, threats of violence, and calls for the boycott of Jewish businesses. In November 2023, a statue of Dove-Myer Robinson, a former Jewish mayor of Auckland, was defaced with a swastika following a protest for a ceasefire between Hamas and Israel.

On October 14, the Auckland War Memorial Museum, lit up in white and blue in a gesture of solidarity with Israel, drew over 100 pro-Palestinian protestors, who disabled the lighting installation, though accounts vary as to whether the lights were covered or damaged. The protest was followed by condemnation of the museum's perceived support of the war in Gaza, which led to an official apology by the institution being issued, though the apology itself was condemned by Jewish organizations as "shameful" and a "betrayal" of the NZ Jewish community. On November 7, pro-Palestinian graffiti was sprayed on the fence of the Beth Shalom centre in Auckland's Epsom suburb. An unsuccessful attempt was also made to set the property on fire. Google Maps had mistakenly listed the property as the local Israeli consulate. Behind the vandalised fence is a building that was until recently home to Habonim Dror Aotearoa New Zealand, a Socialist-Zionist youth movement. The incident was condemned by ACT Party Member of Parliament David Seymour, who reported the matter to Police.

The Green Party MP Chlöe Swarbrick drew criticism for her public usage of the slogan "from the river to the sea, Palestine shall be free". The NZJC responded that "There is one very important question that was not put to Chlöe, and is not put to anybody who uses that phrase: do you believe that Israel should exist, do you believe in a two-state solution? I'd like somebody who uses that chant to actually answer that question." In an ongoing study conducted by the Holocaust Centre of New Zealand, half of Jewish parents surveyed, revealed that their children had been subject to antisemitism since the October 7 attacks.

The NZJC had criticized the "notable silence" of political leaders and demanding of them to confront the rising antisemitic sentiment in the country. Some political leaders were further called out for perceived inflammatory language, with the NZJC claiming that "this directly incites antisemitic behaviour and we call on all leaders to consider their words carefully". For instance, Indigenous rights party Te Pāti Māori immediately likened Israeli retaliatory action to genocide and called for the expulsion of the Israeli and US ambassadors. Anti-Israeli rhetoric further escalated during a parliamentary debate and Question Time on a proposed call for an immediate ceasefire introduced by Foreign Minister and Deputy Prime Minister Winston Peters: Israel's actions were labeled as genocide by Labour’s associate foreign affairs spokesman Damien O’Connor, Green MP Golriz Ghahraman, Green Party co-leader Marama Davidson, and Te Pāti Māori co-leader Debbie Ngarewa-Packer. The NZJC subsequently released a statement expressing their dismay at the language used at the debate.

On 28 November 2024, the NZJC reported a sharp increase in antisemitic incidents, with 227 occurring in the 12-month period since 7 October, an average of 9.7 each month, compared to 166 in the eight years from 2014 to 2022. Notable incidents included a Jewish high school student having antisemitic messages scribbled on his school shirt, an intermediate student being assaulted for wearing a kippah and a government employee resigning after being investigated for sending antisemitic social media messages.

On 6 February 2025, the former building for the Kadimah School in Auckland was vandalised with antisemitic graffiti referencing the Gaza war. Kadimah School board chairperson Darya Bing and New Zealand Jewish Council president Juliet Moses condemned the vandalism as hateful and antisemitic. On 23 February, Police confirmed they were investigating the graffiti vandalism at Kadimah School.

On 21 November 2025, Stuff reported a sharp rise in both antisemitic and anti-Muslim offences since October 7. This rose from 20 between September 2022 and October 2023, to 133 between October 2023 and September 2024 and 97 between October 2024 and September 2025. These figures included 9 antisemitic assaults between October 2023 and September 2024, and six assaults between October 2024 and September 2025. Incidents of property damage rose from four between October 2021 and September 2022, to 11 between October 2022 and September 2023 and 57 between September 2024 and September 2025. NZJC president Juliet Moses expressed concern that New Zealand Jews were being targeted because of the "perceived and real actions" of the Israeli government during the Gaza war and said that the Jewish community had received assaults, attacks on property, graffiti verbal assaults and hate mail. Yael Schochat, of the dissident group "Dayenu — New Zealand Jews against occupation" condemned antisemitic attacks but argued that antisemitism should not be conflated with being "anti-Israel."

Following the 2025 Bondi Beach shooting that occurred on the evening of 14 December 2025, armed New Zealand Police were deployed the following day to guard several Jewish sites including the Holocaust Centre of New Zealand and Kadimah School.

== See also ==
- Antisemitism in Australia
