= Loni Uhila =

- Born: 7 April 1989 (age 37)
- Height: 1.80 m (5 ft 11 in)
- Weight: 125 kg (276 lb)
- School: Sacred Heart College, Auckland

Rugby union career
- Position: Prop
Senior career
Years	Team	Apps	(Points)
2017−2020	Clermont Auvergne	52	(10)
2020−21	La Rochelle	4	(0)
2021-	Hyères	4	(0)
Provincial / State sides
Years	Team	Apps	(Points)
2012–17	Waikato	28	(30)
- Correct as of 16 October 2023
Super Rugby
Years	Team	Apps	(Points)
2016–17	Hurricanes	24	(10)
- Correct as of 6 August 2016

Loni Uhila (born 7 April 1989 in Tonga) is a Tongan rugby union player and professional heavyweight boxer. His nickname called "The Tongan Bear". He plays in the prop position for the provincial based ITM Cup side Waikato. Uhila also plays for Super Rugby franchise, the Hurricanes.

In October 2017, he will join French reigning champions ASM Clermont Auvergne on a one-year contract.

== Professional boxing record ==
1 Wins (0 knockouts, 1 decisions), 1 Losses, 0 Draws
Res.	Record	Opponent	Type	Rd., Time	Date	Location	Notes
Win	1–1	(New Zealand) David Letele	UD	4	2015-12-05	(New Zealand) Claudelands Arena, Hamilton, Waikato	Duco Event's Corporate World Title.
Loss	0–1	(New Zealand) David Letele	SD	4	2014-12-06	(New Zealand) Claudelands Arena, Hamilton, Waikato	Professional debut and for Duco Event's Corporate World Title

== Personal ==
Uhila is married and has a five-year-old daughter, Lile.

Uhila states family is the reason he plays rugby.
