= Vicky Dombroski =

Rugby union career
Provincial / State sides
Years	Team	Apps	(Points)
	Taranaki		(0)
Coaching career
- Years: Team
- 1994–1995: New Zealand

Vicky Dombroski is a former coach of the New Zealand women's national rugby union team. She was also a selector and manager for the team.

== Career ==
Dombroski played for Taranaki at provincial level.

In the late 1980s, the women's rugby movement was emerging but recognition and assistance from the New Zealand Rugby Football Union wasn't available. In frustration, Dombroski wrote a letter to the NZRFU in 1988 requesting permission to have a club competition in Taranaki. She received a letter from former All Blacks coach, John Stewart on behalf of the NZRFU stating that they were in favour of women taking an active role in the game.

She could have attended the 1991 Women's Rugby World Cup, but could not raise the needed $5000.

=== Coaching ===
Dombroski coached the Black Ferns from 1994 to 1995. Until Whitney Hansen's appointment in December 2025, she was the only woman to have coached the side.

She was as a selector for the Black Ferns from 1992 to 1997. She was manager of the team that won the 1998 Women's Rugby World Cup in the Netherlands in 1998, and served until 2000.

Sporting positions
Preceded by Laurie O'Reilly	Black Ferns coach 1994–1995	Succeeded by Darryl Suasua
