= Killer Beez =

New Zealand crime gang

- Founded: 2003
- Founded by: Josh Masters
- Founding location: Ōtara
- Years active: 2003–present
- Territory: Ōtara
- Criminal activities: Drug manufacturing, drug sales, aggravated robbery, assassination, fraud, and money laundering.
- Allies: Black Power, Crips, BTW (Bad Troublesome Ward)
- Rivals: Bloods, Mongrel Mob, Tribesmen

The Killer Beez (Killa Beez) are a large street gang based in New Zealand, mainly based in the South Auckland area. They were founded in 2003, as a large rogue street gang in Ōtara, as a spin-off of the larger "Tribesmen" gang. The Killer Beez were formerly headed by Josh Masters, a well-known kickboxer, also a former vice-president of the Tribesmen MC.

In 2013, there were 138 members in prison, up from 96 in 2011. Most Killer Beez inmates housed in Mt Eden Corrections Facility are housed in the Delta Unit.

== Insignia and slang ==
The Killer Beez emblem or "patch" consists of the words "Killer Beez" and that act as the surrounding rockers for their Skull Fingers Up emblem of a middle finger extended upright with a partially extended thumb. There must be exactly 13 bones which comprise the whole skull finger. This is evident in all of the gang's music videos, released on the Colourway Records music videos. The gang predominantly wear white black and yellow.

Killer Beez members are commonly referred to as Killer(s) or simply as KB by those closely associated with the gang.

A common phrase within the gang's music, as well as being used in its logo, is the term AO, pronounced as separate letters, which is an acronym for the gang motto, All Out.

== Notable members and associates ==
- Josh Masters (founder and overall Killer Beez leader)
- Vila Lemanu (high-ranking chapter leader)
- Rory O'Neill (member)
- Christopher Shadrock (member)
- Hone Kay-Selwyn (member)

== Colourway Records ==
The New Zealand Companies Office lists Colourway Records as registered from 19 February 2007 until 25 February 2014. The company was directly owned by the partner of Josh Masters, Natalie Patricia Eyles. The company address listed was a well known pad for The Killer Beez Gang.

The Killer Beez effectively controlled the record label Colourway Records. Colourway Records was among the assets seized by the New Zealand Police in the 2008 drug raids.

Colourway Records has released several titles, including "Put Ya Colourz On", which also feature Young Sid and Josh Masters. They also released an album in 2008, Skull Fingers Up.

== Incidents ==
- In May 2008, Josh Masters and 41 other members from both the Tribesman and The Killer Beez gangs were arrested in a police sting. In total 60 Killer Beez were arrested in an operation which involved 110,000 intercepted messages. Charges included supplying methamphetamine, conspiracy to supply methamphetamine and money laundering. Masters pleaded guilty and fought to have that overturned, but failed.
- In June 2008, several Killer Beez members, including leader Vila Lemanu and member Christopher Shadrock, were convicted for killing Chinese businesswoman Joanne Wang, after they ran her over in a Manukau shopping mall carpark in front of her 8-year-old son.
- In November 2008, Masters received a 'jailhouse beating' for an outburst in court, leading to complications in the trials of multiple associates.
- On 15 May 2010, Killer Beez member Latu Kepu killed prison guard Jason Palmer with a single punch at medium-security Spring Hill Corrections Facility. The death has been a rumoured gang hit ordered by the Killer Beez.
- On 3 August 2012, Masters was sentenced to 10 years and 5 months in prison for organising drug deals after police intercepted thousands of his coded phone conversations.
- In September 2014, Killer Beez associate Hendrix Hauwai, 17, attacked Lucy Knight, punching her in the head after she tried to intervene in a failed bag-snatch outside a North Shore supermarket. In February 2014, Hauwai was sentenced to jail for 4 years and 9 months by North Shore District Court Judge Pippa Sinclair.
- In October 2016, six guards were attacked with three being injured in a premeditated attack at Auckland Prison at Paremoremo. The attack occurred on 19 October 2016 after a group of inmates in C Block at Auckland Prison attacked guards with three suffering stab wounds to their heads, necks, hands and shoulders just before 2pm. It is widely thought by inmates at Paremoremo that the attack was planned and carried out by members of the Killer Beez gang.
- On 4 November 2016, prominent Killer Bee, Rory William O'Neill, was fatally shot in Blockhouse Bay, two months after being released from prison. O'Neill was reported to have asked not to be released due to the Killers Beez ensuring his safety within the prison system.
- In October 2017, members of the Killer Beez and the 36 (Three Six) gangs were involved in a shooting, where three males in Ōtara were shot in a drive-by shooting. Although the assailants were not identified, the victims of the shooting identified them as members of the gangs.
- On 26 April 2019 Killer Beez head Josh Masters, a prominent gang member was shot by a member of the Tribesmen at a Harley Davidson dealership in Mount Wellington, Auckland. It was an extremely unusual event as both the Killer Beez and Tribesmen were very close gangs that were in a very strong alliance considering the Killer Beez was founded by the Tribesmen as a feeder gang for the Tribesmen.
- In May 2022, conflicts between the Tribesmen and Killer Beez led to shootings in South Auckland. Seven shootings occurred in the suburbs of Ōtara, Papatoetoe, Flat Bush, Papakura, Te Atatū South, Henderson and Mt Albert on the night of the 24th, with two more on the 25th. A week later, on the night of 3 June, another Beach Haven house belonging to a Tribesmen gang member was shot at.
- On 5 May 2024 Robert Sidney Horne was shot dead in Ponsonby, Auckland, by Killer Beez member Hone Kay-Selwyn. Hone Kay-Selwyn was found dead in Taupo on 8 May 2024

== See also ==
- Gangs in New Zealand
- Black Power (New Zealand)
- Mongrel Mob
- King Cobras (gang)
