= King Cobras (gang) =

New Zealand crime gang

- Founded: 1950s
- Founding location: Ponsonby, Auckland, New Zealand
- Years active: 1950s–present
- Ethnicity: Polynesian
- Membership (est.): 400
- Criminal activities: Drug dealing, assault, murder
- Allies: Bloods, Crips, Black Power, Central Auckland street gangs

The King Cobras are a prominent Pacific gang in New Zealand.

== History ==
The King Cobras were founded by Samoans in Ponsonby sometime in the 1950s, making them the oldest gang in New Zealand. Initially, it was restricted to Samoans, but has since accepted other Polynesians. The King Cobras have had a presence across South, Central, North and West Auckland, Hutt Valley, Wellington, Dunedin and Christchurch.

The Cobras have proven to be very violent and have a history of possessing firearms. They have been involved in major cases of drug dealing, including in methamphetamine, cocaine, and marijuana. In 2003, members of the King Cobras ran a large methamphetamine ring along with the Head Hunters in one of Aucklands biggest drug cases. The King Cobras have been involved in several murder cases, including that of a 15-year-old boy, and the shooting of a rival gang member, as part of a membership process.

== See also ==
- Gangs in New Zealand
- Black Power (New Zealand gang)
- Mongrel Mob
- Killa Beez (gang)
