= Denis O'Reilly =

New Zealand community organiser and activist

- Born: 1952 (age 73–74)
- Occupations: New Zealand community organiser, activist, writer

Denis O'Reilly (born 1952) is a New Zealand community organiser, activist, gang advocate and writer. He was a national organiser for, and is a life member of, the Black Power gang. He has campaigned against methamphetamine. He has worked as a senior civil servant, and is chair of both the Waiohiki Community Charitable Trust and the Consultancy Advocacy and Research Trust.

== Early life ==
O'Reilly was born in Timaru in 1952. He was the youngest of six children in a Catholic family, with Laurie O'Reilly an older brother. He attended Roncalli College (then called St Patrick's High School). He originally intended to become a priest, spending a year at Napier's Marist Fathers' Seminary. After leaving the seminary, O'Reilly worked at a gas station and in 1972 he joined the Black Power gang, becoming a national organiser.

== Social activism ==
In the 1980s O'Reilly met and became a friend of the former Prime Minister Rob Muldoon, and was mentored by him into social activism. O'Reilly and his wife advocated against the gang practice of "blocking" (pack rape). In 2004 he allied with members of rival gang the Mongrel Mob to run a campaign against methamphetamine. O'Reilly arranged for 150 gang members to perform a haka at Muldoon's funeral in 1992.

O'Reilly has worked as a civil servant, first as a director of the New Zealand Employment Service and later as chief executive of the Group Employment Liaison Service. He is chair of both the Waiohiki Community Charitable Trust and the Consultancy Advocacy and Research Trust.

In 2008 O'Reilly earned a Master's in Social Practice at Unitec Institute of Technology, with a thesis on processes for Māori whanau to use to envision futures for themselves.

O'Reilly is a life member of Black Power, although he "put his patch down" in 2011. He had laid his first patch on former primer minister Norman Kirk's coffin at his funeral in 1974.

As an advocate for social justice, O'Reilly is asked for comment on gang issues. When the government announced a crackdown on gangs and the establishment of the National Gang Unit in 2024, O'Reilly was supportive, although questioned whether society was ready to embrace former gang members. A protest t-shirt designed by O'Reilly in response to a proposed ban on gang patches in 2009 is held at Te Papa Tongarewa.

== Personal life ==
O'Reilly lives in Waiohiki, Hawke's Bay. He is married to Taape Tareha, with six children.
