= Laurie O'Reilly =

First coach of the New Zealand women's national rugby union team

- Born: 1 February 1942
- Died: 15 January 1998 (aged 55)

Rugby union career
- Position: Prop
Amateur team(s)
Years	Team	Apps	(Points)
1963, 1965	University of Canterbury		(0)
Coaching career
- Years: Team
- 1988: Crusadettes
- 1989–1991: New Zealand Women

Laurence Michael O'Reilly (1 February 1942 – 15 January 1998) was a New Zealand rugby union coach, lawyer, lecturer and Commissioner for Children from 1994 to 1997. He was the first coach of the New Zealand women's national team, the Black Ferns.

== Early career ==
O'Reilly was born on 1 February 1942 and was raised in Timaru, with Denis O'Reilly his youngest sibling. He completed his law degree at the University of Canterbury and was admitted to the bar in 1963, at the age of 21. In 1967 he became a partner for the Cameron & Co law firm.

He was a family lawyer in Christchurch, and he served as Commissioner for Children from 1994 to 1997. He was also a law lecturer at the University of Canterbury, where he coached the men's team. His daughter Lauren is a former Black Fern.

== Rugby career ==
=== Player ===
O'Reilly played Prop and won senior championships with the University of Canterbury in 1963 and 1965.

=== Coaching ===
In 1988, O’Reilly coached the Crusadettes, the University of Canterbury Women's team, and they toured the United States and Europe. A year later he selected the first women's team to represent New Zealand.

O’Reilly had a hand in organising RugbyFest 1990 in Christchurch. It was a two-week women's rugby festival that featured national teams from the Netherlands, the United States and USSR.

On 22 July 1989, the first official New Zealand women's team played the California Grizzlies, a touring side from the United States, at Lancaster Park in Christchurch. He coached the team to the inaugural 1991 Women's Rugby World Cup in Wales.

The Laurie O'Reilly Cup is named in his honour. New Zealand and Australia have competed for it annually since 1994.

== Death ==
O’Reilly died from cancer on 15 January 1998. He held a living funeral before his death; Wayne Smith, who was mentored by O’Reilly, spoke at the event.

Sporting positions
Preceded by N.A.	Black Ferns coach 1989–1991	Succeeded by Vicky Dombroski
