= Jason Palmer (prison officer) =

New Zealand prison guard

Jason Palmer (c. 1977 – 16 May 2010) was an American-born former Marine and the first corrections officer in New Zealand to die while on active duty. He was punched by an inmate, fell, and struck his head on the floor. He died in hospital the following day.

== Biography ==
Born in South Carolina, Palmer attended Jefferson High School in West Virginia before serving four years in the United States Marine Corps, including time at Quantico Marine Corps base. He met a New Zealand woman, Tracy, online and moved to New Zealand. The couple married a year after meeting. At the time of his death, he was survived by Tracy and their three children: Taylor, 15; Riley, 5; and Abbey, 3.

=== Death ===
Palmer worked at the Spring Hill Corrections Facility. He was killed by inmate Latu Savelio Halangingie Kepu while unlocking Kepu's cell with two other officers. As the door opened, Kepu punched Palmer who fell backward and struck his head on the concrete pathway outside the cell. Palmer died in hospital the following day after life support was withdrawn. Palmer had previously reported multiple confrontations with Kepu and had filed several misconduct charges against him, including one the day before the fatal attack. Palmer had allegedly submitted written requests to be reassigned due to receiving death threats from Kepu, but those requests were reportedly denied. Not included in the official inquiry was that the three officers—Palmer among them—who unlocked Kepu’s cell that day were relatively inexperienced. The most senior officer in the unit had been reassigned to a low-security area due to staffing shortages. During the inquest, attention focused on the lack of high-security procedures during the cell unlock, such as why Kepu was not required to stand with his hands on the wall. Critics argued that this focus obscured the core issue: managerial incompetence in what was supposed to be a low-security facility.

Kepu had previously assaulted another officer three weeks earlier and had been scheduled for transfer to the maximum-security facility at Paremoremo. But the transfer had not yet occurred due to overcrowding. He pleaded guilty to manslaughter and was sentenced to six years and four months in prison. His appeal against the length of the sentence was denied.

Kepu was a known member of the Killer Beez gang and reports surfaced suggesting Palmer's death was a gang-ordered hit. It was also reported that prison staff were aware of threats made against Palmer. The Department of Corrections denied these claims, stating that an internal investigation found no fault on the part of prison management or staff. Palmer’s mother, Ada Palmer, disagreed with the findings, reportedly stating, "They said it was an accident... it is a cover-up."

Judith Collins, then Minister of Corrections, called Palmer's death the saddest day in the department's history. In Parliament, she moved that the House express its "deep sympathy and condolences to the wife, family, friends, and colleagues of Spring Hill Corrections Officer Jason Palmer, who died on Sunday as a result of an assault by a prisoner."
