= Wanganui District Council (Prohibition of Gang Insignia) Act 2009 =

Act of Parliament in New Zealand

New Zealand Parliament
- Long title: to prohibit the display of gang insignia in specified places in the district.
- Royal assent: 9 May 2009
- Commenced: 10 May 2009

Legislative history
- Introduced by: Chester Borrows
- Passed: 6 May 2009
- Status: Repealed

The Wanganui District Council (Prohibition of Gang Insignia) Act 2009 was an Act of Parliament passed in New Zealand in 2009. It empowered the Wanganui District Council to ban gang insignia in specified areas within the district. It was repealed by the Gangs Act 2024, which includes a prohibition on the display of gang insignia in a public place across New Zealand.

== Background ==
The bill was introduced in an effort to reduce gang violence in Whanganui. It empowers the Wanganui District Council to make bylaws prohibiting gang insignia in specified areas, which must be signposted. Those violating the bylaws face a fine of up to $2,000. The Act also grants police powers of arrest, search and seizure to aid in the enforcement of such bylaws.

== Introduction and passage ==
The bill was introduced to the House on 22 November 2007 by National Party MP Chester Borrows as a local bill. It attracted an adverse report from the Attorney-General under the New Zealand Bill of Rights Act 1990 as being inconsistent with the right to freedom of expression. The bill was given its first reading on 2 and 16 April 2008, and passed 106 to 13, with the Green Party, Māori Party, ACT New Zealand and Progressive Party voting against. On 29 October, the Law and Order Committee recommended it be passed with amendments. Passage of the bill was delayed by the 2008 election. It passed its third reading on 6 May 2009, and passed 62–59, being opposed by the Labour, Green, Maori and Progressive parties and ACT MPs Heather Roy and Roger Douglas.

== Subsequent events ==
In July 2009, the Wanganui District Council passed a bylaw prohibiting gang insignia from the urban area of Whanganui, Mowhanau/Kai Iwi and all rural halls in the district. The bylaw came into force on 1 September 2009. The first arrest under the bylaw was made the same day.

In July 2010, the Hells Angels lodged an application for judicial review of the bylaw in the High Court, alleging that the bylaw went beyond the powers granted by the Act and that it violated the Bill of Rights.

The High Court of New Zealand struck down the bylaw in March 2011, finding that the scope was broader than what the Council was authorised to do by Parliament, and breached the New Zealand Bill of Rights Act 1990 by limiting rights more than was reasonably necessary.
