= Lauren O'Reilly (rugby union) =

New Zealand rugby union player

- Born: Lauren Michelle O'Reilly
- Height: 1.62 m (5 ft 4 in)
- Weight: 64 kg (141 lb)
- School: Riccarton High School
- University: University of Canterbury
- Notable relative: Laurie O'Reilly (father)
- Occupation: Schoolteacher

Rugby union career
- Position: Hooker
Provincial / State sides
Years	Team	Apps	(Points)
	Canterbury		(0)
	Taranaki		(0)
International career
Years	Team	Apps	(Points)
1992–1994	New Zealand	1	(0)

Lauren Michelle O'Reilly is a former New Zealand rugby union player.

== Rugby career ==
O'Reilly played as a hooker for Canterbury, Taranaki, and New Zealand. She made her debut for the Black Ferns against the Auckland XV in 1992 at Auckland. She later earned her only official cap against Australia at Sydney in 1994. In all, she played four games for the Black Ferns between 1992 and 1994, but did not score any points.

In 2019, O'Reilly and several former Black Ferns were capped in a special ceremony in Auckland. She is the 44th capped Black Fern.

== Personal life ==
O'Reilly is married to Zane Webby, who played at flanker for Taranaki. O'Reilly's father, Laurie, was the first coach of the New Zealand women's national rugby union team.

O'Reilly was educated at Riccarton High School, and went on to study at the University of Canterbury, graduating with a Bachelor of Education degree in 1988, and a Master of Education degree in 1995. She has been a careers advisor and physical education teacher at Francis Douglas Memorial College in New Plymouth for over 20 years.
