= Head Hunters Motorcycle Club =

New Zealand outlaw motorcycle club

- Founded: 1967
- Founding location: Auckland, New Zealand
- Years active: 1967–present
- Territory: National presence
- Membership (est.): 275 (2016)
- Criminal activities: drug dealing, theft, murder, money laundering
- Allies: Hells Angels MC, Nomads, Filthy Few,
- Rivals: King Cobras

The Head Hunters Motorcycle Club are an outlaw motorcycle club in New Zealand. They are found all around the North Island, but are mainly based in East Auckland, with its headquarters being located in Ellerslie. They also have chapters in West Auckland, Wellsford, Northland and Wellington. They have a long criminal history, with more than 1000 notable criminal convictions.

== History ==
The Head Hunters were formed as a large multi-ethnic street gang in 1967, in the East Auckland suburb of Glen Innes. They later relocated to West Auckland, and evolved into an outlaw motorcycle club in 1985. They became a legally incorporated society in 1996. In the 20th century the gang developed a reputation for violence and restricted its membership, having fewer than 30 patched members and considering themselves an elite gang.

Detective Sergeant Craig Martin Turley said in 2000, "The Head Hunters Motorcycle Club is considered one of the most dangerous organised criminal operations in the country. It controls the West Auckland crime scene... ...They are responsible for the manufacture, sale and distribution of Class A, B and C controlled substances, with deals taking place throughout the country... ...The organised theft, receiving and distribution of stolen property has a value, over the years, in the millions... ...The murders, serious assaults and suspicious disappearances are also cause for considerable alarm. The extortions, home invasions and robberies are ongoing."

The Head Hunters "patched over" the Wellington-based Sinn Fein MC in 2011, the Satan's Slaves MC in 2014 and the Epitaph Riders of Christchurch. The Satan's Slaves gang had been formed in Wellington in 1969.

In late August 2024, High Court Justice Peter Andrew ruled that the Commissioner of Police could seize NZ$15 million worth in cash and property assets from the gang and its alleged boss Wayne Doyle on the grounds that they had been acquired through criminal activities including drugs and standovers. The affected assets include the East Chapter's pad in Marua Road.

== Organisation ==
The Head Hunters are an organised crime group, using companies, societies, and trusts to shroud their operations and cash flow in secrecy. The gang has a single strategy: remain limited in members, report all to the central headquarters in Ellerslie, and expand nationally. While the Head Hunters' main rivals are loosely connected gangs with no centralised national body, the Head Hunters legally incorporated a national body with the Societies Office in 1996, the Head Hunters Motorcycle Club Incorporated.

They are allies of the Hells Angels, the Filthy Few, and the Nomads. The organisation has "patched over" smaller regional gangs, allowing them to become Head Hunters, providing they adhere to the business model. The reach of the Head Hunters is multinational, with links to the Asian organised crime syndicates well known by the New Zealand Police. These connections are the main connection for the Head Hunters acquiring their supplies for their methamphetamine operations

== Members and chapters ==
=== Notable members ===
- Dave Smith - Former President, Head Hunters West (1987–2010). Deceased, 2010.
- David Dunn - President, Head Hunters West (2010 – 2014).
- Terrance McFarland - Most senior West Member, Head Hunters West. (1969–Present).
- Connor Morris - Member, Head Hunters East. Deceased, 2014.
- William "Bird" Hines - Senior Member, Head Hunters East
- Wayne Doyle - President, Head Hunters East (1995 – present).
- Gavin Johnston - Senior Member, Head Hunters Wellington.
- David Gerrard O'Carroll - Senior Member, Head Hunters East
- Lyndon Richardson - Most Senior Member, Head Hunters Christchurch.

=== Chapters ===
- The original Head Hunters were based in Glen Innes; however, moved to the West of Auckland, eventually becoming the Head Hunters West chapter in 1985.
- The Head Hunters East chapter of the Head Hunters was established in 1995 after Wayne Doyle was released from prison for the King Cobras murder.
- The Head Hunters Wellington chapter was established in September 2012, based out of a cage-fighting gym in Upper Hutt.
- The Head Hunters North chapter based in Wellsford.
- The Head Hunters Bay of Plenty chapter is based in Tauranga.
- The Head Hunters Christchurch chapter was established in October 2015, and is headquartered at 31 Vickery Road, located in the Christchurch suburb of Wigram. The property was acquired through Lincoln Property Investments Limited, a holding company owned and operated by the gang. Directors of the company include the infamous New Zealand -underworld figure Terrence McFarland.

== Criminal activity and incidents ==
- In 1967, members of the Head Hunters gang engaged in a brawl against then-rivals the Black Power.
- In August 1983, Head Hunters West Auckland members, Dave Smith and Jason Ruka, were charged with murdering rival-gang, Highway 61, member Steven Bliss, who died after being stabbed nine times at a party. The charges were eventually dropped after witnesses began to recant their statements. It is thought that statements were withdrawn based on fear of retribution by the Head Hunters MC.
- In 1984, Members of the Head Hunters West Auckland were convicted for the assault of a person that resulted in a permanent disability.
- In 1985, two Head Hunters East Auckland members, Graham "Choc" Te Awa and Wayne Doyle, were convicted of murdering a member of the King Cobras, Siaosi Evalu.
- In 2001, Head Hunters East Auckland member, Graham "Choc" Te Awa was shot in the torso by former Hells Angels MC member Peter Vitali. The incident occurred in retaliation to an apparent grudge the Head Hunters MC had gained against Mr Vitali. The shooting occurred when around seven members of the Head Hunters MC were caught attempting to steal Mr Vitali's 1970 Ford Mustang and his Boat. Mr Vitali subsequently drove directly at the members with a four-wheel drive, leading to a Head Hunter member dropping a pistol. Mr Vitali shot five times, hitting Mr Te Awa in the chest.
- In May 2003, Head Hunters West member Willie Hines, along with other accomplices, were implicated in one of the largest methamphetamine busts in New Zealand history, nicknamed "The Methamphetamine Makers Co. Ltd" by the Police. The 'cook house', when raided, showed the extent of the operation, with the run-off waste alone containing over $150,000 worth of methamphetamine.
- In August 2003, the Head Hunters East Auckland were threatened by Senior Sergeant Wendy Spiller to cancel all future after ball parties that had been booked to occur from the East Chapters headquarters, on the basis that the building was "a known criminal premises", and the possibility of the Sale of Liquor Act being breached. The Head Hunters cancelled all events, and banned all future school-based events from being held at their headquarters.
- In January 2013, the Police led a raid on a Stokes Valley home with the intent of arresting an unnamed Head Hunters Wellington member for " aggravated robbery and kidnapping in connection with an incident in December in which a man was allegedly threatened, beaten and robbed in Wellington".
- In June 2013, the New Zealand Police led raids on 32 properties linked to the Head Hunters Wellington. The raids ultimately led to the destruction of a methamphetamine laboratory, and the seizure of 42 grams of methamphetamine, 450 ecstasy pills, 1 kilogram of dried marijuana, unannounced amounts of LSD, GBL, and cannabis oil, as well as multiple firearms.
- In 2014, Head Hunters East Auckland member Connor Morris was killed with a single machete blow to the back of his head in a Massey street. He was the partner of Millie Holmes, Step daughter of the late Sir Paul Holmes and daughter of Hine Elder. His funeral received international media coverage, due to its attendees.
- In August 2016, it was revealed that high-ranking member of the Head Hunters East Auckland was convicted for cooking methamphetamine. Police seized over $1 million in cash, and over 55 firearms from his property upon arrest.
- In March 2017, Head Hunters Tauranga member Dwaine Riley was arrested and sentenced to seven years in prison after being found guilty of prolonged domestic violence charges. Me Riley would regularly beat his former partner, and was convicted on 12 accounts of the crime.
- In October 2017, it was reported that police had raided the Head Hunters Christchurch gang pad and seized hundreds of thousands of dollars' worth of assets. The assets were seized as they were identified as being acquired through money laundering and drug manufacturing operations undertaken by the chapter.
- In December 2017, Head Hunters East President Wayne Doyle, and entities associated with him, were investigated by police. A judge found in favour of the police, who argued that Mr Doyle had used a charitable trust he controls, the That Was Then This Is Now Trust, to launder nearly $20 million between the years of 1994 and 2017. Most transactions of the trust were between Head Hunters patched members, or associated trusts and companies. It was the suspicious transactions that initially led the Police to investigate further, leading to the ruling.
- In February 2021, 11 people associated with the Head Hunters MC were arrested in Operation Evansville. They were arrested on charges of manufacturing and distribution of methamphetamine, as well as illegal possession of firearms. Police seized over $1 million in cash, gold, Bitcoin, and vehicle assets. They also seized 4 firearms.

== Business ventures ==
The Head Hunters commonly use the purchase of legitimate businesses in order to cover, and launder, for drug and extortion work undertaken by the gang. Allegations of money laundering are yet to proven in a New Zealand court of law.

=== Legal status ===
The 'HEAD HUNTERS MOTORCYCLE CLUB INCORPORATED' (Society No: 829572) was incorporated as an incorporated society in New Zealand on 5 December 1996.

=== Assets ===
The 2017 Financial Statements, of the incorporated portion of the organisation, lodged with the New Zealand Societies Office stated the total assets to be $106,630. The assets listed included a property, 7 Centennial Park Road, Wellsford. A search of the property shows clear Head Hunters New Zealand imagery and symbolism. The Centennial Park property is also listed as the registered office of the society, and is a well known headquarters for the Head Hunters North chapter, located in Wellsford.

The Marua Road headquarters for the East Chapter is owned by a New Zealand company, East 88 Property Holdings Ltd. The shares of the company are all held by trusts, of which all are overseen by the most senior members of the Head Hunters. (East represents the East Chapter of the gang, 88 represents the eighth letter of the alphabet, H, therefore 88 represents HH, the shortened writing of Head Hunters.)

=== Fight clubs ===
Fight Club 88
The organisation is well known to own, and operate, Fight Club 88 out of their Ellerslie headquarters, 232 Marua Road.

The Head Hunters profit not only from the boxing training enterprise, but from the '88' merchandising that sees them sell caps, hats, t-shirts, gym bags, and sweatshirts, among others.

Capital Cage Club
The Wellington Chapter previously operated a Cage Fighting training facility in Upper Hutt. The operation was run by the Head Hunters-run charitable organisation, Capital Transitions Charitable Trust Board. The Board was incorporated on 18 September 2012, with the purpose of providing a 'training facility for small, targeted groups of people, who may not otherwise have access to such facilities.' It was reported in 2013 that the gym had since been closed, with all signage, equipment, and items linked to the gym being removed in February 2013.

The club had been registered to an Upper Hutt address, 16 Goodshed Road, and had operated by Wellington Chapter members Nathan Waka Paul Hemana, and former-Head Hunters Motorcycle Club Incorporated trustee, Philip MacFarland.

The charitable trust is still registered, and has not yet been struck off the register, indicating it is still actively used.

== Community service ==
The Head Hunters East Auckland have opened their gym to the public, providing a place for the youth to get off of the streets. The gang also has placed a ban on methamphetamine use within its ranks.

== See also ==
- Gangs in New Zealand
- List of outlaw motorcycle clubs
