= New Zealand Nomads =

New Zealand criminal gang

Nomads
- Founded: 1977
- Founded by: Dennis Hines
- Founding location: Horowhenua
- Years active: 1977–present
- Territory: New Zealand
- Criminal activities: Drug dealing, theft, murder, Extortion
- Allies: Black Power, Head Hunters
- Rivals: Mongrel Mob

The Nomads are a large organised criminal gang formed in the Horowhenua Wellington, New Zealand.

== History ==
The Nomads were originally members of the Black Power, known as the "Black Power Nomads", before a large portion of the gang split and formed their own gang in 1977.

In 1997, tensions heated up with the Highway 61 gang and resulted in the murder of Nomad Malcom Munns.

In 2009, Nomads founder and President Dennis Hines died. He is the brother of senior Head Hunters member, William Hines. He was imprisoned on a count of nearly 100 criminal convictions.

The gang had 103 members in prison in 2013.

Paul Rodgers (Porky Rimene) is the Nomad gang boss.

== Notable members ==
- Dennis Hines - founder and long serving President, died 7 June 2009.
- Rex David Rimene - co-founder senior member president, died 8 August 2016
- Jack Whakatihi - Nomad President from 2009. Imprisoned 2012.
- Malcom Munns - murdered by the Highway 61 gang.
- Paul Rodgers (Porky Rimene) - jailed in 2012 for 15 years for supplying methamphetamine.
- Ji (Rex) Daley - Jailed in 2006 and 2020 for violent offending.

== See also ==
- Gangs in New Zealand
