= Prohibition of Gang Insignia in Government Premises Act 2013 =

Act of Parliament in New Zealand

New Zealand Parliament
- Royal assent: 12 August 2013
- Commenced: 28 June 2012
- Repealed: 23 September 2024

Legislative history
- Passed: 2013

Related legislation
- Gangs Act 2024
- Status: Repealed

The Prohibition of Gang Insignia in Government Premises Act 2013 was legislation passed by the New Zealand Parliament on 7 August 2013, which went into effect when given royal assent on the 12 August 2013. The act prevents "gang insignia" defined in the act as —

a) a sign, symbol, or representation commonly displayed to denote member of, an affiliation with, or support for a gang, not being a tattoo; and b) includes any item of clothing to which a sign, symbol, or representation referred to in paragraph (a) is attached.

from being worn on any government premises, which are properties, whole or parts of structures owned or under control by the Crown, the Police, a Crown entity or a local authority. It also includes the buildings and grounds of any school, public hospital or health facility owned or under the control of a district health board, and lastly any swimming pool or aquatic centre owned by or under the control of a local authority.

It was repealed by the Gangs Act 2024, which includes a prohibition on the display of gang insignia in a public place (extending beyond Government premises).

== Response ==
When the bill was proposed by National Party member Todd McClay, Leader of Mana Movement Hone Harawira stated that it was a "deeply racist" due to the majority of gang population being those of Māori descent. He also labelled the bill as "woefully underprepared".
