= Black Power (New Zealand gang) =

Prominent gang in New Zealand

- Founded: 1970
- Founding location: Wellington
- Years active: 1970–present
- Territory: New Zealand; Australia; Bali
- Ethnicity: Mixed, predominantly Māori and Pacific people
- Criminal activities: Drug dealing, assault, murder
- Allies: Crips, Killer Beez, King Cobras New Zealand Nomads
- Rivals: Mongrel Mob, Bloods, Storm Troopers

Black Power is a prominent gang in New Zealand. Members are predominantly Māori and Pasifika.

== History ==
It was formed as the Black Bulls by Reitu Harris and Māori youth in Wellington about 1970, and changed its name to Black Power in 1971. The gang was founded as a rival to the Mongrel Mob gang and white power gangs. Black Power then spread to other major centres and rural towns throughout New Zealand.

Founder Reitu Harris was very politically aware, and during the early 1980s the gang gained some credibility, with social activist Denis O'Reilly joining, former judge Bill Maung acting as their political advisor and Prime Minister Robert Muldoon meeting with them and helping them to find accommodation and form work trusts.

The gang became heavily involved in organised crime, such as drug manufacturing and dealing. While the gang has distanced itself from violent acts of some of its members, for example, a child abuse case, police have in return accused the gang members of using violence as a 'learned behaviour from involvement in the gang'.

There were 697 members in prison in April 2013.

The gang also has a strong presence on the Gold Coast of Queensland in Australia.

== Insignia ==
Black Power colours are predominantly blue and black. The patches usually feature a clenched fist which is a symbol of the American Black Power movement. The patch will also be tattooed on the member's body.

== See also ==
- Black power – political ideology that originated in the U.S.
