= Gang patch =

Identifying insignia of a street gang

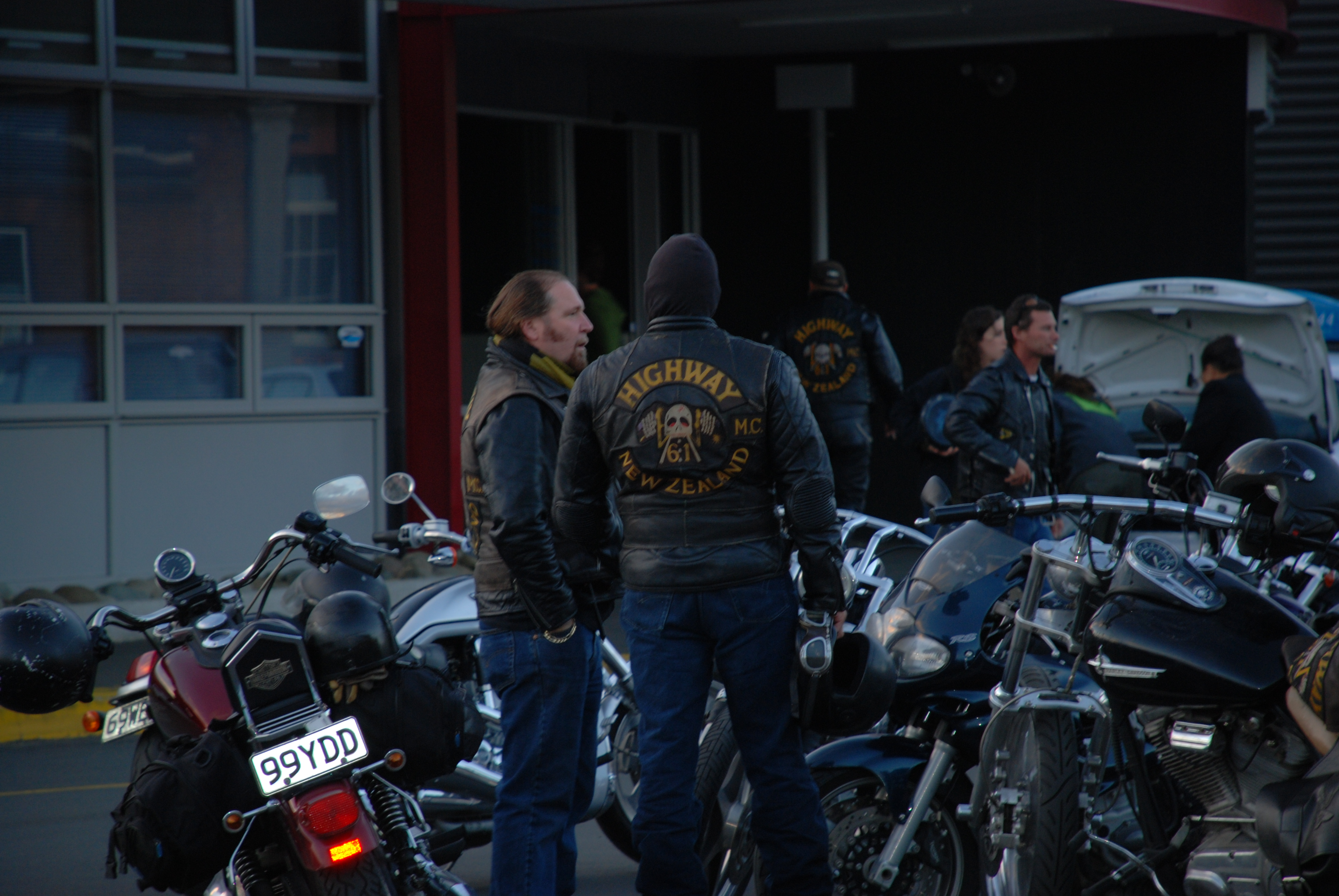
Highway 61 gang members, with patch clearly displayed

A gang patch in New Zealand refers to the identifying insignia of a street gang. Patches have been linked to intimidation of members of the public by gang members. Gang patches perform much the same identification role as gang colours do in other countries.

Each of the country's gangs has its own forms of insignia, of which the most prominent is often a large symbol, frequently worn by members on their clothing as a symbol of their gang membership. The patch is often seen as being as important to gang members as a military flag is to members of an army group, and any insult to the patch is taken as being an insult to the gang as a whole.

As such, the term has a more general meaning. Being a "patched" member of a gang is to be a fully initiated member of the gang – and often a ranking member of the gang's structure. The physical patches are highly valued and have been used with some success in negotiations.

== Legality ==
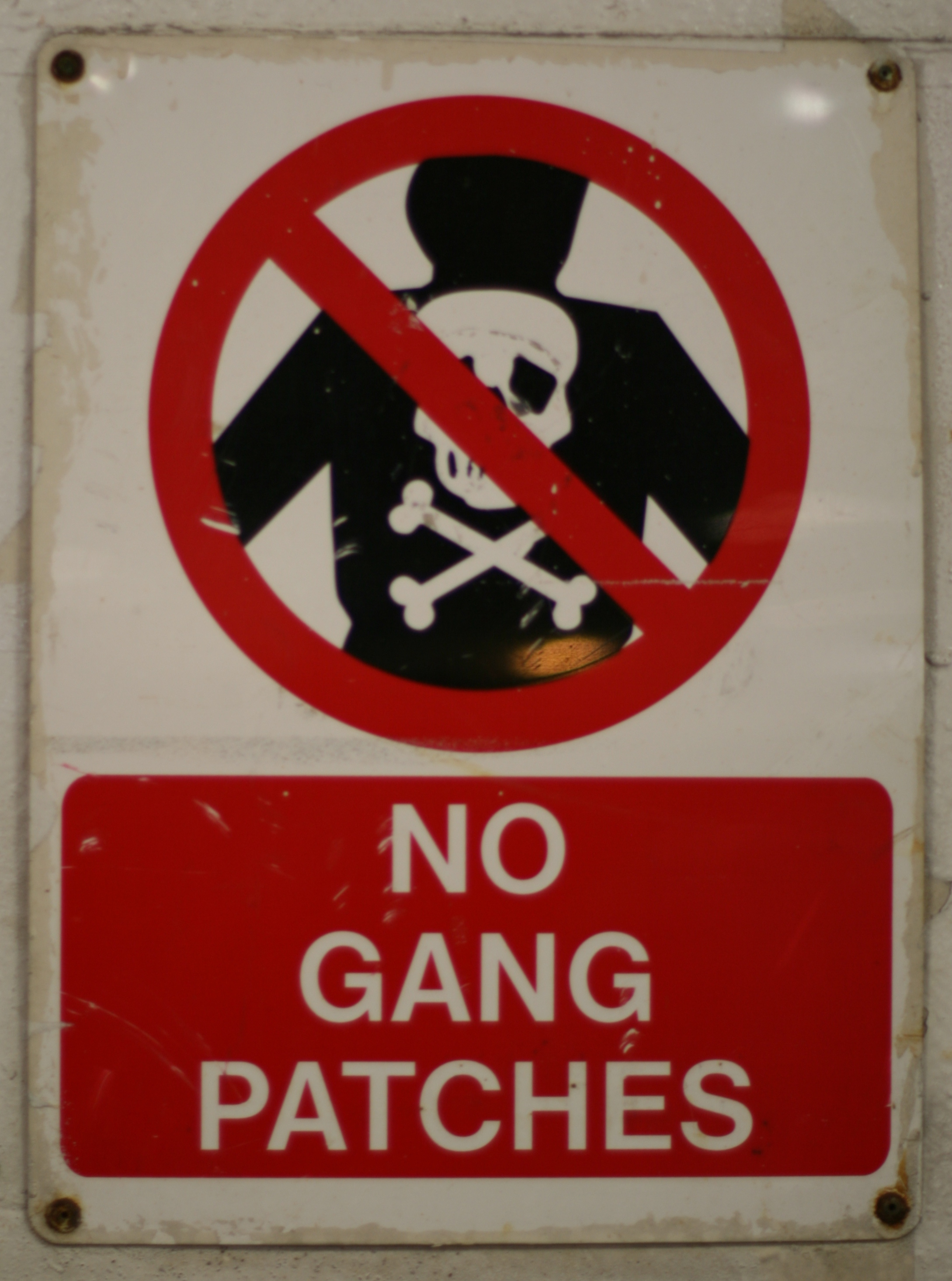
Sign on the Cook Strait ferry Arahura prohibiting the display of gang patches

=== Wanganui District Council legislation ===
The explanatory notes to the "Wanganui District Council (Prohibition of Gang Insignia) Bill", a local bill introduced into the New Zealand Parliament by then Whanganui MP Chester Borrows, records that the Wanganui District Council already had an informal policy that prohibited wearing or displaying gang insignia in public buildings. However, as result of attacks on police and the 5 May 2007 murder of two-year old Jhia Te Tua during a drive-by gang shooting, the council sought the legal power to make bylaws that prohibited wearing gang insignia in designated spaces. The bill received Royal Assent on 9 May 2009 and came into force the next day as the Wanganui District Council (Prohibition of Gang Insignia) Act 2009.

Wanganui District Council then passed bylaws banning the wearing of gang insignia, or patches and similar symbols, within parts of their jurisdiction. The ban was tested by judicial review in a hearing before Clifford J in November 2010. The judge reserved his decision.

=== Government legislation ===
On 28 June 2012, Rotorua MP Todd McClay, introduced the "Prohibition of Gang Insignia in Government Premises Bill" into the New Zealand Parliament. The stated aim of the bill was to "provide an environment free from gang intimidation" in all Government premises, including schools, hospitals and local authority premises, as well as those of central government. The bill, which had very similar provisions to the Wanganui District Council's by-law, received Royal assent on 12 August 2013 and became law as the Prohibition of Gang Insignia in Government Premises Act 2013.

In February 2024, the Sixth National Government of New Zealand, comprising the National Party, ACT Party and New Zealand First, announced plans to ban gang patches in public as part of a raft of anti-gang legislation.

On 19 September 2024, the New Zealand Parliament passed the Gangs Act 2024 which banned gang patches and gave police and courts new dispersal and non-consorting powers for combating gangs. While National, ACT and NZ First supported the bill, it was opposed by the Labour, Green, and Māori parties.

By August 2025, the Labour Party had officially adopted a policy of not seeking to repeal the ban on gang patches. In mid-August 2025, Labour MP Peeni Henare expressed support for repealing the gang patch ban during a candidates debate for the 2025 Tāmaki Makaurau by-election. Labour leader Chris Hipkins and deputy leader Carmel Sepuloni subsequently stated that Henare's remarks did not represent the party's official policy. In response, National Party MP and Justice Minister Paul Goldsmith questioned whether Labour would commit to its promise not to repeal the gang patch ban.

During the 2026 New Zealand general election in a debate, Labour leader Chris Hipkins confirmed Labour would keep the gang patch ban.

== See also ==
- Gang colours
- Colours (motorcycling)
- Gangs in New Zealand
