= Mongrel Mob =

New Zealand street gang

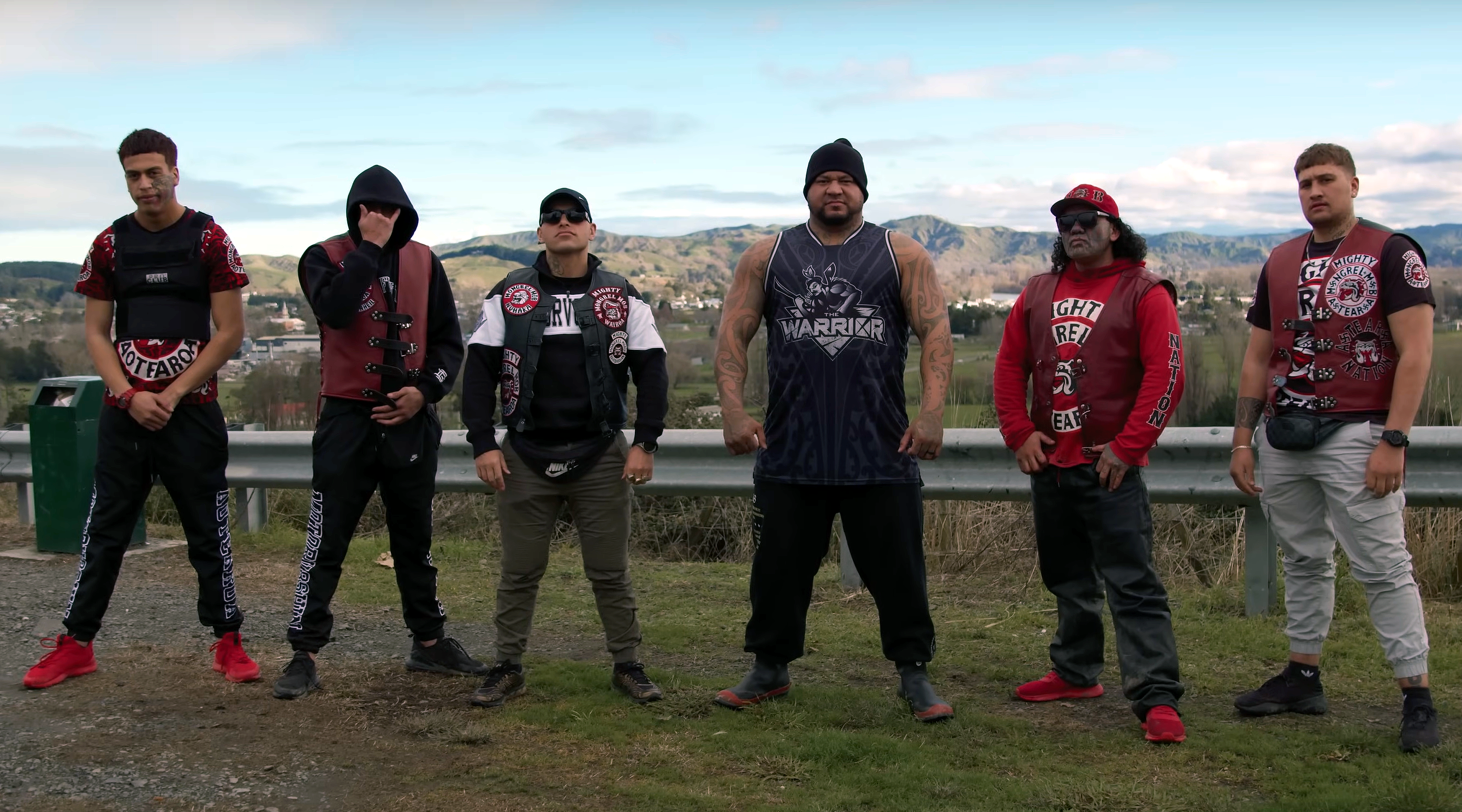
- A group of members
- Founded: 1962
- Founding location: Hawke's Bay, New Zealand
- Years active: 1960s–present
- Territory: New Zealand, Australia, Canada
- Ethnicity: Mixed, predominantly Māori and Pacific people
- Membership (est.): 1,100+
- Criminal activities: Drug trafficking, weapon trafficking, extortion, assault, murder, rape, robbery, theft and money laundering
- Rivals: Black Power, Road Knights, Tribesmen, and Killer Beez

The Mongrel Mob, also known as the Mighty Mongrel Mob or simply 'the Mob,' is a prominent organised-crime group and prison gang based in New Zealand. With over thirty chapters across the country and additional operations in Australia and Canada, they comprise the largest gang in New Zealand. They are especially active in the King Country, Kawerau, Ōpōtiki, Waikato and Hastings.

The Mongrel Mob's primary rival is the Black Power gang, and the longstanding feud between the two groups has resulted in numerous public and violent clashes over the years. Both gangs have a significant presence in New Zealand's criminal underworld, with the Mongrel Mob being one of the most notorious and widely recognised both at home and abroad.

== History ==
The gang began with a group of mainly Pākehā youths from Wellington and Hawke's Bay in the 1960s. Legend within the gang holds that the name originated from the comments of a judge in the Hastings District Court, who referred to a group of men before him as mongrels. Whatever the origin, the group embraced the term. By the late 1960s loose groups of rebellious young men in Wellington and Hawke's Bay were calling themselves Mongrels. By 1966 they were wearing patches bearing the name 'Mongrel Mob'.

By about 1970 the Mongrels were also known as the Mongrel Mob, and the gang had expanded to include numerous Māori. Members consider Hastings in Hawke's Bay to be the gang's "Fatherland" or birthplace, and the gang first became known for its violence in Hawke's Bay. Later, similarly named groups sprang up around the country, forming their own independent chapters.

In the 2000s and 2010s, the Mongrel Mob began expanding into parts of Australia. In 2018 they also expanded into Canada.

=== Chapters ===
According to Te Ara, in 2010 there were over 30 recognised chapters of the Mongrel Mob; including,

- Mongrel Mob Hastings – 1962
- Mongrel Mob Wellington – 1962
- Mongrel Mob Auckland Maximum Security Prison – 1979
- Notorious Mongrel Mob – 1981
- Mongrel Mob Perth – 1989–1989 (defunct)
- Mongrel Mob Te Puke
- Mongrel Mob Melbourne – 2013
- Mongrel Mob Darwin – 2016
- Mongrel Mob Gold Coast – 2016
- Mongrel Mob Fatherland – 2018
- Mongrel Mob Canada – 2018
- Mongrel Mob Riders, Hawke's Bay – 2020
- Mongrel Mob Maketu

== Insignia ==
Mongrel Mob colours are predominantly red and black. The patches usually feature a British Bulldog wearing a German Stahlhelm, which supposedly is an image intended to offend as it is a British Bulldog wearing the helmet. The patch is worn on the back of "patched members": those considered loyal and trustworthy enough to be in the gang. The patch will also be tattooed on the member's body. Mob members are known for their tattooed faces and red bandannas.

== Membership ==
A majority of members are Māori, European or other Polynesian ethnic groups, with Māori predominating.

A "prospect" is a person who is loyal to the gang but is not a "patched member" yet and must normally do errands or "missions" to show his loyalty to his gang. A prospect normally has a patched member to report or "clock in" to. This patched member normally decides when it is time for the prospect to be "patched". The hierarchy is: captain or president, vice president, sergeant at arms, patched members, prospects. In some cases they use younger blood gangs as prospects.

There were 934 members in prison in April 2013, making up more than a tenth of all New Zealand prisoners. In the Wellington region, there were an estimated 194 patched members in 2013.

=== Notable members ===
- Anaru "Fats" Moke – Wellington member, often featured in the media
- Ray Whare – President of Mongrel Mob Te Puke
- Dennis Makalio – Senior member, often featured in New Zealand media
- Frank Milosevic – President of the Mongrel Mob Kawerau
- Harry Tam – Senior member, often featured in New Zealand media.
- Joe Edmonds – Senior member, deported from Australia while attempting to establish a chapter
- Roy Dunn – Mongrel Mob President who died on 1 April 2016
- Tuhoe Isaac – Former senior member often featured in the media
- Grantito Chacone – Former National President of the Mongrel Mob Kingdom – Australia
- Daniel Eliu – Auckland Notorious Mongrel Mob President, shot dead outside a South Auckland church in December 2022

== Organised crime ==
=== Operation Crusade ===
In 2001, the New Zealand Police launched Operation Crusade, a long police surveillance operation of the Christchurch-based Mongrel Mob Aotearoa chapter. The main purpose of the Operation was to disrupt and destroy a suspected drug sales-ring controlled by the Mongrel Mob. Over a 15-month period, the Operation targeted the gang using taps on the phones of known Mongrel Mob Aotearoa members and undercover police buying drugs from the gang. The operation culminated in co-ordinated raids resulting in nearly 40 arrests and a "huge trial" in the High Court at Christchurch.

Joseph 'Junior' Wiringi and most of the chapter's top hierarchy were arrested in 2003 as part of the police investigation on more than 70 charges, including dealing in methamphetamine and magic mushrooms and possessing firearms. The operation confirmed the suspicions of police and revealed brazen drug dealing from the gang's former headquarters on Wilsons Rd.

=== Operation Walnut ===
Operation Walnut was a four-month long investigation targeting an organised methamphetamine supply-and-distribution ring operating out of the Mongrel Mob Porirua in the Wellington region. The investigation began in December 2016 when New Zealand Police officers infiltrated the Mongrel Mob via placing undercover officers as associates of the organisation, where they would buy methamphetamine from the gang. As well as undertaking 8 search warrants in the Wellington region, the Operation also targeted a property in the East Auckland suburb of Howick where the Mongrel Mob is suspected of importing the methamphetamine. The operation involved another 150 New Zealand Police officers, with 120 operating in the Wellington raids and the remaining 30 operating in the Auckland raids. From December 2016 to April 2017, it is thought that the Mongrel Mob had distributed over 20 kilograms of methamphetamine, valued at over $18 million.

The first day of raids led to the confiscation of a Mercedes-Benz, a container property, 2 kilograms of methamphetamine, $450,000 in cash, two stolen motorbikes valued at $30,000, and over 13 vehicles, a jetski, 2 boats, valued at $1.8 million. The second day of the raids led to 7 arrests, as well as grenades, money, 2 kilograms of methamphetamine, locked safes, and 11 guns being found and confiscated. The Operation culminated in 14 arrests; 4 kilograms of methamphetamine, valued at $3.6 million; $2.3 million in property; and $500,000 in cash being confiscated.

=== Operation Notus ===
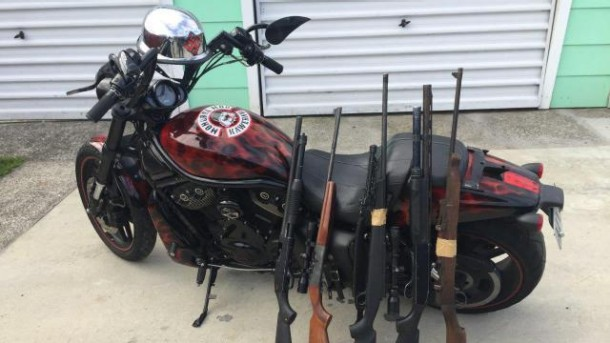
Confiscated firearms positioned on a confiscated motorcycle

In October 2017, Operation Notus was launched because of community concern in regards to the Mongrel Mob Kawerau and their alleged involvement in the 'commercial distribution of methamphetamine and cannabis' within the community. The six-month-long investigation involved over 300 New Zealand Police staff, including the Auckland-based National Organised Crime Group, Tauranga-based Armed Offenders Squads, and the locally based Asset Recovery Unit. The investigation proved the community concern to be accurate, and led to the arrests of over 30 members, and associates, of the Mongrel Mob Kawerau. The final number of arrested associates stood at 38 arrested, with more arrests likely to occur

The investigation culminated with the raids of over 40 properties, in Kawerau, Ōpōtiki, Whakatāne; and 3 properties in Gisborne and Hastings; leading to the subsequent arrest of the 30 associates. Along with the arrests, the police confiscated over 25 firearms, over $2.6 million worth of methamphetamine, over $100,000 in bank accounts as well as over 100 cannabis plants. Also confiscated were residential property, boats, jet-skis, motorcycles, and cars. Eastern Bay of Plenty Area Commander Inspector Kevin Taylor said, "We are committed to protecting our communities from the harm caused by organised crime and today's arrests will go a long way to disrupting the supply of methamphetamine and cannabis in Kawerau and wider Bay of Plenty region." Kawerau is commonly known as a 'red-town', a town that is known to be a Mongrel Mob stronghold.

=== Other incidents ===
- In June 1971, members of the Hells Angels, Highway 61, the Polynesian Panthers and the Mongrel Mob gangs engaged in a large gang-related brawl in central Auckland.
- On 14 August 1981, Mongrel Mob Wellington leader Lester Epps awoke outside the gang pad. Epps had fought members of the Eastern Suburbs Rugby League Club at the Tramway Hotel the night before. Epps tried to flee through the Basin Reserve, however he was ultimately caught and beaten. He died later in hospital. All people involved eventually received 18-month prison terms for manslaughter.
- In December 1986, a young woman was kidnapped by the Mongrel Mob and taken to a convention in Ambury Park in Auckland, where she was subsequently raped by over 15 members of the gang.
- In June 1987, Mongrel Mob member Sam Te Hei raped and murdered 16-year-old Colleen Burrows in Napier.
- In 2003, members of the Murupara Mongrel Mob, and the Tribesmen MC Murupara chapters were involved in multiple methamphetamine laboratories that were raided by police.
- On 9 September 2011, a member of the Wairoa Mongrel Mob chapter fired a sawn-off shotgun at a local Rugby League match because there were Black Power gang members in attendance.
- In August 2016, a 31-year-old with Mongrel Mob Aotearoa links and under the influence of methamphetamine and alcohol caused a crash with a taxi in Christchurch, injuring two people.
- According to the Northern Territory News, between the establishment of the Mongrel Mob Darwin in September 2016 and January 2017, there were roughly four unreported assaults involving Mongrel Mob members, including a brawl with a member of the Australian Hells Angels.
- On 13 January 2018, a gunfight erupted in Whakatāne, Bay of Plenty, when a funeral procession of the Mongrel Mob Kawerau chapter was ambushed by members of the Outback Blacks – a sub-chapter of Black Power.
- On 10 March 2018, Joe Edmonds, a senior Mongrel Mob member, was deported from Australia, along with four others, for allegedly attempting to establish a Mongrel Mob chapter in Western Australia.
- On 22 March 2018, police raided four houses in Ōpōtiki, leading to three Mongrel Mob Barbarians members being arrested and charged with a "connection to the supply of methamphetamine in Ōpōtiki."
- On 22 October 2024, the Mongrel Mob Barbarians MC's East Bay chapter in Ōpōtiki was targeted by a North Island-wide Police operation called Operation Highwater. Police arrested 28 people and seized about NZ$800,000 in assets. In response, Te Pati Māori co-leader Rawiri Waititi and local Māori leader Te Aho accused the Police of terrorising Māori families during the operation. Police Minister Mark Mitchell defended Police's conduct during the operation, rejecting accusations of racism, bias and intimidation. The Police also countered that Operation Highwater had the support of local Māori leaders across Whakatōhea. By 31 October, Police had filed 99 charges against 28 individuals including 20 significant drug charges following a ten-month investigation into the Ōpōtiki chapter. On 5 November, Mitchell denied allegations that children had been left unsupervised in Ōpōtiki following their parents' and guardians' arrests.

== Businesses and rehabilitation programmes ==
In 2005, the Mongrel Mob Notorious chapter and its president Roy Dunn started a labour-hire business to do painting, demolition, and other work. Dunn said, "We are setting this up for our kids, creating the employment, bringing them in." A search on the New Zealand Companies Office showed that Dunn was a joint-shareholder in two companies, both named Rent A Bro Limited at one point, however the older company's name was changed to BRO 2007 Limited in 2011, just months before the second company was incorporated. BRO 2007 was incorporated in 2007 as Rent A Bro Limited and changed its name to BRO 2007 Limited in 2011 and subsequently removed from the company registry in 2012. Rent A Bro Limited was incorporated in 2011 and was removed from the company registry in 2013.

In 2010, Dunn and his Māngere-based Notorious chapter announced the Hauora Programme partnership with the Salvation Army to combat methamphetamine drug use. By 2013, they had completed five intakes of 'P' users who wanted to rid themselves of addiction.

In July 2021, Prime Minister Jacinda Ardern confirmed that she and several Government ministers, including Grant Robertson, Poto Williams and Kris Faafoi, had approved $2.75 million in funding to support the Mongrel Mob-led Kahukura drug and trauma rehabilitation scheme. The scheme was run by Harry Tam's charity Hard2Reach, which aimed to address trauma and drug abuse through a live-in marae-based programme in Waipawa using funds from criminal proceeds that had been seized by the Police. The Ministry of Health supported the Kahukura proposal to receive funding from Proceeds of Crime, which is administered by the Ministry of Justice. The Government's support for the Kahukura scheme was criticised by the opposition National Party leader Judith Collins and Simeon Brown, Sensible Sentencing Trust co-leader Darroch Ball, and mental health advocate Mike King.

== In media ==
- Ross Kemp on Gangs (2005) – Season 1, Episode 3 – Episode documenting the history of the Mongrel Mob in New Zealand
- Jono Rotman (2007) – a photographer; has featured members of the Mongrel Mob gang in a series of award-winning, traditional portraits
- Arman Alizad, a Finnish journalist visited the Mongrel Mob in his TV-series: Arman ja viimeinen ristiretki – Uusi Seelanti – Maorijengit (Arman and the last crusade – New Zealand – Māori gangs)

== See also ==
- Crime in New Zealand
