= Stacey Morrison =

New Zealand broadcaster

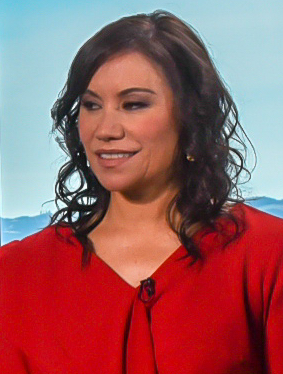
- Morrison in 2019
- Born: Stacey Larissa Pirihira Daniels; 1973 or 1974 (age 52–53); Christchurch, New Zealand
- Occupations: Television host, radio host, actress, MC
- Years active: 1990–present
- Television: What Now, It's in the Bag, Mai Time, Whānau Living
- Spouse: Scotty Morrison (m. 2006)
- Children: 3

Stacey Larissa Pirihira Morrison (née Daniels; born 1973 or 1974) is a New Zealand television and radio host. Morrison speaks fluent te Reo Māori and is active in promoting Māori language, culture and health.

== Biography ==
Morrison was born Stacey Larissa Pirihira Daniels in Christchurch in 1973 or 1974, the daughter of radio broadcaster James Daniels. She was educated at Aranui High School, where both she and her father served as members of the school's board of trustees.

When Daniels was 18 years old, she landed her first television role, on the popular New Zealand children's show What Now. She went on to be a host on the TV show Mai Time during the late 1990s. In 2002, Daniels was nominated for her work on Mai Time in the Best Presenter category at the 2002 TV Guide New Zealand Television Awards. She has also hosted radio shows on Mai FM, Flava and Classic Hits FM.

Daniels married Te Karere presenter Scotty Morrison in Rotorua on 7 January 2006. They have three children together.

In 2009, Stacey Morrison signed on to co-host a new version of the hit show It's in the Bag, with Pio Terei on Māori Television.

Morrison is an advocate and educator of Māori language and has co-written several Māori language books for learners. Morrison learnt Māori language as an adult. In February 2020, Morrison was appointed cultural advisor for the Australian soap opera Home and Away after a Māori family joined the cast of the show. Translated into te reo Māori by Morrison, the 2025 book Taku Ikura Tuatahi by Qiane Matata-Sipu was a finalist for the Wright Family Foundation Te Kura Pounamu Award.

== Books ==
- Morrison, S., & Morrison, S. (2020). MAORI MADE FUN: 200+ puzzles and games to boost your reo. Raupō Publishing (New Zealand)
- Morrison, S. (2019). Māori at work: The everyday guide to using te reo Māori in the workplace. Auckland, NZ: Penguin Random House New Zealand
- Morrison, S., & Morrison, S. (2018). Māori made easy 2: The next step in your language-learning journey. Raupō Publishing (New Zealand)
- Morrison, S., & Morrison, S. (2017). Māori at home: An everyday guide to learning the Māori language. Raupō Publishing (New Zealand)

== See also ==
- List of New Zealand television personalities
