= Aotearoa Television Network =

Aotearoa Television
- Country: New Zealand
- Broadcast area: Auckland
- Headquarters: Auckland, New Zealand

Programming
- Picture format: 1080i (HDTV)

Ownership
- Owner: Aotearoa Television Network

History
- Launched: 1 May 1996; 30 years ago
- Closed: July 1997; 29 years ago

The Aotearoa Television Network (ATN) was the first television station to broadcast primarily in the Māori language, though the venture ultimately proved unsuccessful. At its peak, the channel had an estimated audience of 18,000 viewers. Limited audience, insufficient funding and related uncertainties led to its closure in early 1997. The station broadcast in Auckland on UHF channel 35.

== History ==
ATN originated in early 1996, when Te Māngai Pāho (TMP) invited tenders for a trial Māori-language television service to operate under a UHF licence in Auckland. The winning bid — led by Puhi Rangiaho, Tawini Rangahau, Morehu McDonald, Robert Pouwhare, and Tukuroirangi Morgan — was announced on 7 March 1996. Broadcasting began on 1 May as a pilot service, which was formalised in October that year as a regular regional station. Among the requirements were a minimum daily schedule of three hours, thirty minutes of which were original content, and maximum advertising and promotional content at eight minutes per hour. The station operated from 5pm to 10:30pm on weekdays and 6pm to 10:30pm on weekends. The news were in Māori, while othe rprogramming was presented in a mix of Māori and English.

Due to TMP’s limited budget, ATN operated with only a 500-watt transmitter, resulting in weak or non-existent reception across much of its intended catchment area.

ATN was notable for placing Māori-language programming in primetime slots — a contrast to earlier efforts such as Te Karere, which had been broadcast in less prominent timeslots, as well as TV One dropping Te Karere on days when cricket matches were shown, or dropping it altogether at Christmas. Its evening news programme was Te Heteri. A scandal emerged on the 14 November 1996 edition, after an interview provided incorrect facts about Tainui Development Ltd., putting its operations in jeopardy.

In 1996, ATN also briefly owned Max TV after acquiring production company Vidcom from Reston Griffiths.

Despite these developments, the service faced persistent funding shortfalls and operational uncertainties. In January 1997, it axed twenty jobs and TMP refused to renew its funding past 6 February. There were some successful programmes, such as Hip Hop Shop (in English), presented by Patrick McPhee, and which gained an audience in its coverage area, by using music as a revitalisation tool for Māori culture, especially among the under-35 audience. Facing lack of TMP funds, the government announced a plan to inject NZ$4 million to keep the channel afloat by June. However, the budget was considered to be too tight for a limited audience (a weekly average of 18,000 viewers) according to Tau Henare. He also observed that the drama series Citylife cost NZ$250,000 an episode while an average ATN programme cost NZ$10,000. Helen Clark believed that the ATN salvation deal was an act of cronyism. On 29 January, the government put its funding plan on hold.

A frequently cited example of controversy surrounding the network’s finances was Tuku Morgan’s purchase of a NZ$89 pair of underwear using station funds. The transaction took place at Politiks, an expensive store in Newmarket. ATN was not aware of the affair when it was reported in early February 1997. Channel director Morehu McDonald also spent NZ$16,000 worth of clothes there.

By 9 February, its staff had been awaiting a Cabinet decision, which also included the NZ$4 million grant promised the month before. Helen Clark advised its shutdown. The following day, Cabinet rejected the funding package, justifying it on ATN's management and controls. Mid-month, ATN staff was awaiting a new savings package, during a series of daily negotiations. Following the funding failure, the staff left the premises on 27 February and moved to new premises, aiming to establish a new Māori television channel. As of 3 March, ATN was still on air.

On 2 April, it was confirmed that ATN was selling three hours of its evening schedule to The Vibe, a rock music show produced by Eric McPhee's son Patrick, from 9pm to midnight. Negotiations were underway with Taiwanese, Indian and Chinese groups to air their programmes. Māori programming was still seen, for three to four hours a day, as new content or repeats.

A law firm allegedly owed money for ATN, and announced a plan to wind up operations in September. The company shut down on 25 September. The channel had shut down in July.

== See also ==
- Māori Television – a successful bilingual Māori-language television service
- Te Reo (TV channel) – Māori Television’s sister channel, broadcast entirely in Māori
