= New Zealand–Palestine relations =

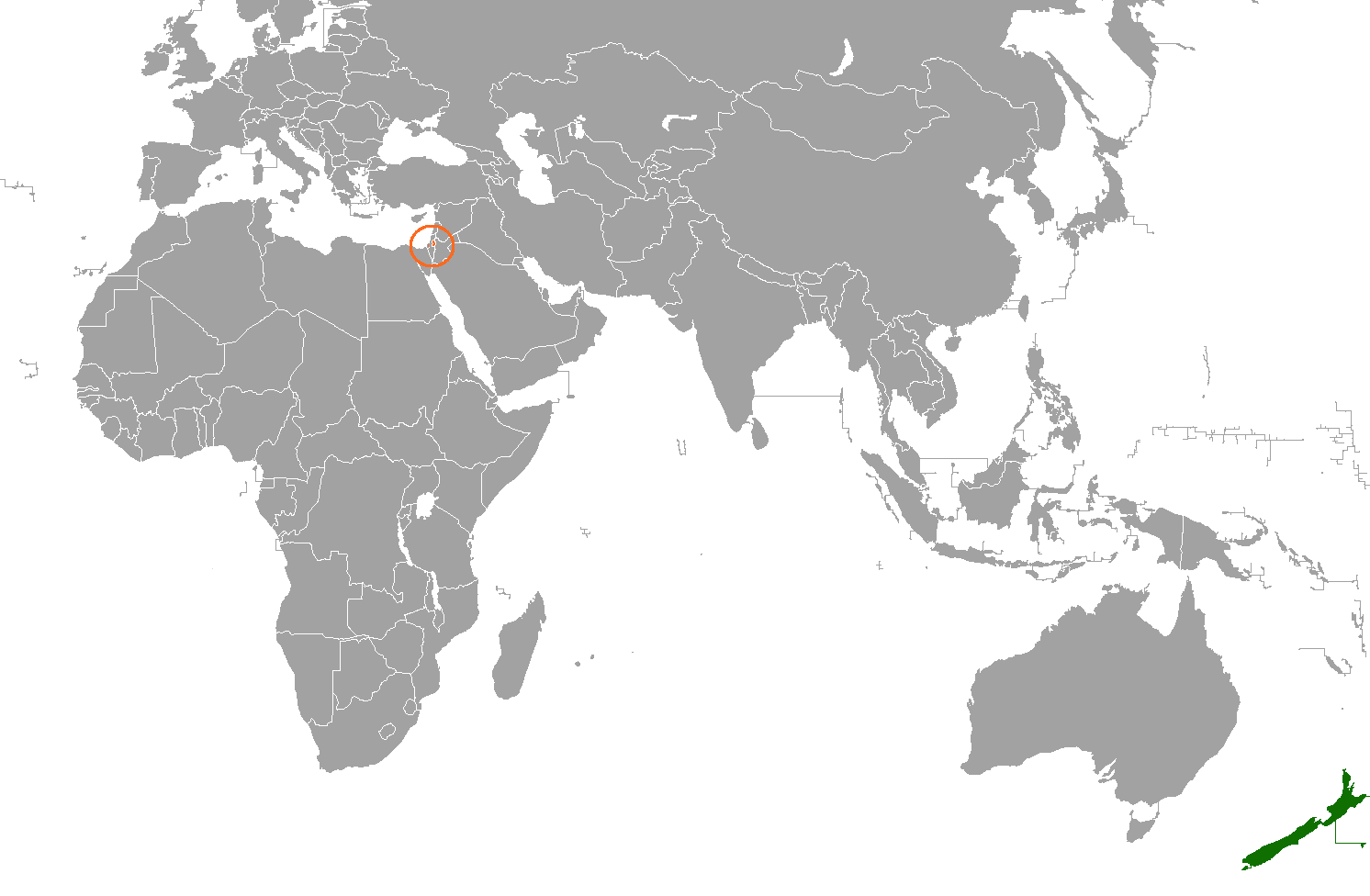

- New Zealand: Palestine

Diplomatic mission
- Embassy of New Zealand, Ankara, Turkey: General Delegation of Palestine to Australia, New Zealand and the Pacific

New Zealand–Palestine relations refer to foreign relations between New Zealand and the State of Palestine. New Zealand does not recognise Palestine as a country.

New Zealand supports a two-state solution to the Israel–Palestine dispute.

== History ==
=== 20th century ===
During World War I, around 6000 New Zealand soldiers fought in the Sinai and Palestine campaign, a British campaign to drive the Ottoman Empire out of the Levant, leading to the establishment of British-controlled Mandatory Palestine in 1920.

In 1975, New Zealand voted to designate permanent observer status to the Palestine Liberation Organisation in the United Nations. In 1988, the government of New Zealand recognized the Palestine Information Office as the official representative of the Palestinian Liberation Organization based in Canberra. New Zealand's embassy in Turkey is responsible for Palestinian affairs.

=== 21st century ===
In late November 2012, New Zealand voted in support of a resolution to grant the State of Palestine "non-member observer state" status in the United Nations. The New Zealand representative said that its vote was "consistent with its long-held support for the aspirations of the Palestinian people." New Zealand also reiterated Israel's right to exist in security and a two-state solution but maintained that recognition of Palestinian statehood was a separate issue.

In 2018, New Zealand singer Lorde called off a tour of Israel following pressure from two Palestinian activists in New Zealand. The activists were fined by a court in Israel for their actions which they refused to pay.

In May 2021, the Green Party with the support of Te Pāti Māori introduced a resolution calling on New Zealand to recognise Palestine. It failed as it was not supported by the New Zealand National Party and ACT Party.

Prior to the outbreak of the Gaza war in October 2023, the then governing New Zealand Labour Party had promised to establish diplomatic relations with Palestine if elected, but later walked back on that decision. In April 2024, the opposition Labour called for New Zealand to recognise Palestinian statehood.

In May 2024, New Zealand voted in favor of a resolution to enhance the Palestinian role in the United Nations. The resolution passed in the United Nations General Assembly with the support of 143 countries. New Zealand Foreign Minister Winston Peters said that New Zealand supported enhancing Palestine's status at the UN but reiterated that "this does not amount to recognition of Palestinian statehood."

==== 2023 Gaza War ====
The New Zealand government condemned the Hamas attack that led to the 2023 Gaza war and defended Israel's right to defend itself. It called for a ceasefire and asked Israel to abide by international law. New Zealand also announced NZ$10 million for Palestine and Israel. Chris Hipkins, leader of the New Zealand Labour Party, called for a ceasefire while other parties did not.

Pro-Palestinian protestors in New Zealand sprayed red paint on the United States consulate. A pro-Israel rally led by Destiny Church clashed with pro-Palestinian protestors outside Parliament in December 2023.

In late January 2024, New Zealand suspended its annual NZ$1 million aid contribution to UNRWA (the United Nations Relief and Works Agency for Palestinian Refugees in the Near East) following allegations that several UNRWA workers had participated in the 2023 Hamas-led attack on Israel. This followed a decision by the Ministry of Foreign Affairs and Trade to review New Zealand's aid to UNRWA in light of the allegations.

In late February 2024, Prime Minister Christopher Luxon and Foreign Minister Winston Peters confirmed that the New Zealand Government had designated the entire Hamas organisation as a terrorist entity. Previous governments had only designated the military wing of Hamas as a terrorist organisation. In addition, the New Zealand Government banned several extremist Israeli settlers who had committed violence against Palestinians in the West Bank.

According to Whakaata Māori's Te Ao Māori News, New Zealand approved more visas for Israelis than Palestinians during the conflict. In March 2024, New Zealand Arab Association spokesperson Katrina Mitchell Kouttab urged the Government to create a special humanitarian visa for Palestinians to leave Gaza similar to the humanitarian visa programme created in 2022 for Ukrainians fleeing the Russian invasion of Ukraine.

In early June 2024, Foreign Minister Peters announced that New Zealand would resume its annual NZ$1 million funding to UNRWA.

In mid-May 2025, Peters joined 22 European, Australian, Canadian and Japanese foreign ministers and the European Union in issuing a joint statement calling on Israel to allow a full resumption of aid to Gaza. Israel has imposed a full-scale blockade on humanitarian aid into the territory since March 2025. Peters said: "We believe the excuse Israel's got has long since evaporated away, given the suffering that's going on. Many countries share our view - that's why overnight we put out the statement.

On 30 July 2025, New Zealand joined 15 other countries including France, Canada and Australia in signing the "New York Call" which proposed recognising Palestinian statehood at the United Nations General Assembly in September 2025. This announcement was criticised by both the US and Israeli governments for "rewarding" Hamas' terrorism. On 9 August, the New Zealand, Australian, German, Italian and British Foreign Ministers issued a joint statement condemning Netanyahu's plan to militarily occupy Gaza City.

On 27 September 2025, Foreign Minister Peters confirmed during the 80th session of the United Nations General Assembly that New Zealand would not recognise Palestinian statehood on the grounds there was no "fully legitimate" state to recognise. He also reiterated New Zealand's condemnation of Hamas and opposition to Israeli military actions and Israeli settlements in the West Bank. The New Zealand Government also allocated NZ$10 million worth of emergency supplies to the Gaza Strip.

In late January 2026, Luxon and Peters confirmed that New Zealand would not join US President Donald Trump's Board of Peace, which aims to oversee the reconstruction of Gaza.

== Diplomatic visits ==
Murray McCully, Minister of Foreign Affairs of New Zealand, visited Ramallah in February 2010.

In 2015, Dr Riad Malki, Minister of Foreign Affairs of Palestine, visited New Zealand. He held meetings with Murray McCully, Minister of Foreign Affairs of New Zealand. New Zealand drafted a resolution at the United Nations Security Council calling Israel to halt building illegal settlements in Palestinian territories. Jim McLay was appointed the representative of New Zealand to the Palestinian Authority.

Greg Lewis, New Zealand's Special Representative to Palestine, met Mohammad Shtayyeh, Prime Minister of Palestine, in Ramallah in August 2022.

== See also ==
- Foreign relations of New Zealand
- Foreign relations of Palestine
- International recognition of the State of Palestine
- Israel–New Zealand relations
