= Mihingarangi Forbes =

New Zealand journalist and broadcaster

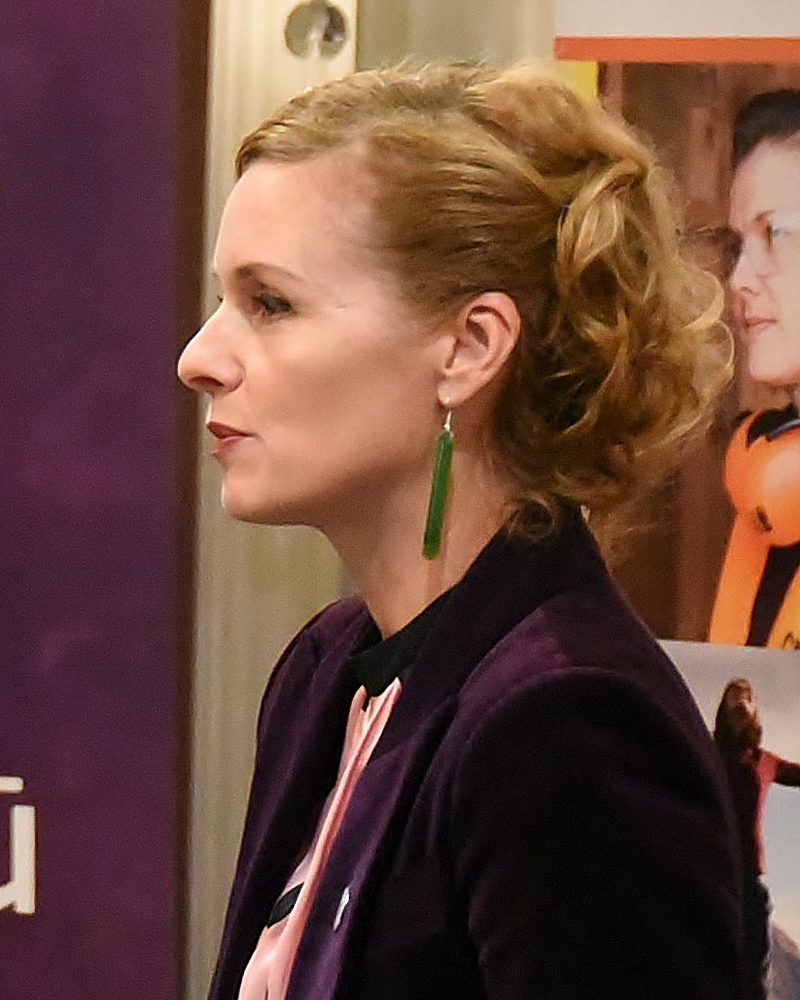
Forbes in 2018

Mihingarangi Forbes (born 1972 or 1973), also known as Mihi Forbes, is a New Zealand journalist, television presenter and radio broadcaster. She has worked on current affairs shows including Campbell Live, 20/20, and Native Affairs. In 2008, she won a Qantas award for 'Best Reporter for Daily Current Affairs'; in 2020, she won 'Best Presenter: News and Current Affairs' at the New Zealand Television Awards.

Forbes is known for leading a 2013 investigation into alleged misspending by the Te Kōhanga Reo Trust Board.

== Early life ==
Forbes was born as Joanna Mary Forbes in 1972 or 1973 and grew up with her mother in Feilding, New Zealand. Her father is a "Māori bushman" of Ngāti Paoa and Ngāti Maniapoto heritage, and her mother, a counsellor, is Pākehā (non-Māori) and a relative of Kate Sheppard. Although Forbes's grandmother was fluent in Māori, she spoke English at home.

As a child, Forbes was deeply interested in journalism and storytelling, using a tape recorder to deliver fictional news and weather bulletins for her family.

Forbes graduated from Feilding High School in 1990. When she turned 19 or 20, she attended Waikato Institute of Technology, Te Ataarangi Māori-language immersion college and became fluent in te reo. Despite initially being known as Joanne, Forbes changed her name to Mihingarangi after her immersion experience – she and her fellow students had translated their names into Māori during the programme, and the new name stuck.

== Career ==
After finishing school, Forbes worked at a bar for a year before moving to Auckland. In 1993, she read community news for Tainui Radio. Despite her lack of formal journalism training, in the 1990s, Forbes was offered an internship with TVNZ's Māori news programme Te Karere. Following the birth of her first child in 2001, she worked briefly as a producer for Radio New Zealand. After that, Forbes worked as a producer for the TV3 current affairs show 20/20.

In 2008, Forbes worked at TV3's current affairs show Campbell Live, earning a Qantas award for 'Best Reporter for Daily Current Affairs'. During her time on the show, she conducted an infamous interview with businessman Alasdair Thompson, challenging his earlier comments about women earning less pay because of their menstrual cycles.

=== Māori Television ===
In 2012, Forbes joined Māori Television as the producer of the news show Te Kāea. In February 2013, Forbes became the presenter of Māori Television's current affairs show Native Affairs. During a well-known 2014 interview with Jamie Whyte — a political candidate for ACT New Zealand — Forbes highlighted his ignorance of the Māori health initiative Whanau Ora.

==== Kōhanga Reo National Trust scandal ====
In October 2013, Native Affairs aired an investigation led by Forbes into alleged misspending by the Te Kōhanga Reo Trust Board. The show obtained the credit card transaction details of one board member and the general manager of the trust fund's charitable subsidiary. The day after the show aired, Education Minister Hekia Parata and Māori Affairs Minister Pita Sharples met several trust board members at Parliament to discuss the allegations.

==== Resignation ====
On 4 June 2015, Forbes announced her resignation from Māori TV on Twitter. Media reports suggested that her departure from Māori TV was related to increasing editorial pressure on her work – her follow-up story on the Kohanga Reo National Trust had been held back, delayed without a clear explanation why. Forbes stated that she had felt she was "losing control" of her stories.

In 2016, after her resignation Maori Television accused Forbes of taking several items of designer clothing from the company wardrobe without permission, breaking the story within hours of the launch of her new current affairs show, The Hui Forbes denied any wrongdoing, confirming to reporters that the clothing had been promised to her by her former boss at the company as compensation for additional work completed.

=== Radio New Zealand ===
One day after she resigned from Māori TV, it was announced that Forbes was joining Radio New Zealand (RNZ) as a specialist correspondent for Māori affairs. She co-presented RNZ's Saturday Morning for two years until August 2026, when she resigned shortly after being given four weeks’ notice of the termination of her position.

In November 2026, Forbes and her colleagues won two awards at the 2026 New Zealand Screen Awards for their work on RNZ's Mata Reports (Best Current Affairs Programme) and Mata with Miningarangi (Best Māori Programme).

==== Atlas Network investigation ====
In early 2024, Forbes interviewed ACT Party leader David Seymour. In that interview, she asked him questions about the Atlas Network and implied that ACT had links to the network, which Seymour denied. Seymour compared ACT's purported links to the Atlas Network to the Pizzagate conspiracy theory. Seymour has previously referred to people at the Atlas Network as his "old friends" on ACT's website.

=== Aotearoa Media Collective ===
Forbes has her own production company, Aotearoa Media Collective, together with Anabelle Lee-Mather, releasing podcasts and mini-documentaries under the Mata name.

== Personal life ==
Forbes has four children, two with former partner Duncan Garner. Forbes strongly advocates for te reo, raising her children to speak Māori and English.

== See also ==
- List of New Zealand television personalities
