= The Casketeers =

- Created by: Annabelle Lee-Mather
- Directed by: Susan Leonard
- Starring: Francis Tipene; Kaiora Tipene
- Country of origin: New Zealand
- Original language: English
- No. of seasons: 5
- No. of episodes: 40

Production
- Executive producers: Carmen J. Leonard, Philip Smith
- Producers: Carmen J. Leonard; Anna Lynch, Susan Leonard
- Running time: 23 minutes
- Production companies: Great Southern Television; Seven Studios

Original release
- Network: TVNZ 1
- Release: 13 January 2018 – present

The Casketeers is a New Zealand reality television series that was first broadcast on 13 January 2018 on TVNZ 1, Netflix and SBS. The series follows a New Zealand couple, Francis and Kaiora Tipene, who own and run Tipene Funerals, a funeral parlor with branches in the Auckland suburbs of Onehunga and Henderson, as well as the other funeral directors and assistants employed there.

The series combines humour and pathos by focusing on families and staff, the stories of individual deaths and bereaved families, the trials and triumphs of running a business, local and traditional funeral and grief practices, and the quirks and relationships of the Tipenes and their staff.

The series features extensive use of Te reo Māori, both in the everyday English narrative and also in the counselling the casketeers provide to their clients. The Māori words spoken by the couple are displayed on screen alongside an English translation.

Season 1 tells the story of the business and the running of the funeral home, the cultural diversity of the practice from uplifting of the dead through to the final burial, and interviews with the staff throughout each episode.

Season 2 follows on from season 1 with many surprises and turns, including the relationship between husband and wife and introductions of new staff members, the roles they play, and everyday struggles.

Season 3 brings more heartbreak, sadness and love to the Casketeers, focusing on both branches, more staff members and topics that are often not talked in a public space. This season also covers the expansion of services offered by the Tipenes.

Season 4 shows the impact that COVID-19 had in Aotearoa New Zealand on the funeral business and funeral traditions within different cultures.

Season 5 follows after much of the restrictions for COVID-19 have been relaxed, and business returns to normal operations.

== Cast ==
- Francis Tipene, founder and co-owner of Tipene Funeral Homes.
- Kaiora Tipene, Francis's wife and co-owner of Tipene Funeral Homes
- Fatafehi "Fehi" Tamale, funeral director at Tipene Funeral Homes
- Nona (Fiona) Bakulich, funeral director at Tipene Funeral Homes
- Andrew Thompson, funeral director at Tipene Funeral Homes
- Stephanie Samu, funeral director at Tipene Funeral Homes
- Logan Tipene, funeral director at Tipene Funeral Homes
- Vanessa Tamale, receptionist at Tipene Funeral Homes and Fehi's sister-in-law
- Lync Hetaraka, maintenance at Tipene Funeral Homes
- Jay Evans, embalmer for Tipene Funeral Homes (season 4- )

== Development and reception ==
The series was considered "an unexpected runaway success" in New Zealand. In December 2018, the show was released internationally on Netflix. A second series of the show aired on TVNZ 1 beginning 14 Jan 2019 and was made available for streaming globally on Netflix in 2019. The show's first two seasons were funded by Te Māngai Pāho, a funding body that promotes Māori language and culture. Māori is spoken throughout the series as well as English, and the series credits are listed in both languages. Both seasons were removed from Netflix in March 2023.

== Episodes ==
=== Season 1 ===
No. overall	No. in season	Directed by	Original release date
1	1	Susan Leonard	13 January 2018
A married couple, Francis and Kaiora Tipene, run Tipene Funerals. The show follows their business and the funerals they put on, respectfully dealing with the family of and depictions of the deceased, while also following their relationships with their staff, and their family relationship.
2	2	Susan Leonard	3 February 2018
Francis must organise the tangi for a member of his whānau, as well as a young mother who dies unexpectedly. Traditional funeral practices are covered. On a more humorous note, Francis makes a decision to purchase a vehicle of questionable quality, against Kaiora's wishes.
3	3	Susan Leonard	20 January 2018
Francis and his staff lead the burial of someone whose body has been returned to Aotearoa from Australia. A new funeral director leads her first solo funeral. Francis struggles to convince Kaiora of his desperate need for (yet another) leaf blower.
4	4	Susan Leonard	27 January 2018
Funeral director Fiona directs a Tongan funeral. Francis makes questionable business decisions because of his love for his community. On a lighter side, the staff argues over the identity of a cookie thief.
5	5	Susan Leonard	10 February 2018
For his health, Francis must go back to the gym, which he doesn't enjoy. The staff prepare the body of a Niuean fisherman for a journey.
6	6	Susan Leonard	13 January 2018
Funeral directory Fiona oversees a Samoan burial, and the Tipene family prepares a funeral for a young extended family member. As advertising for their funeral home, Francis wants the staff to put on a show for the local rest home.

=== Season 2 ===
No. overall	No. in season	Directed by	Original release date
7	1	Susan Leonard	14 January 2019
The Tipene funeral home has new staff members, and Francis has a new look. The Tipene funeral home staff oversee a funeral and the exhumation of a WW1 veteran.
8	2	Susan Leonard	21 January 2019
The Tipene funeral home prepares for renovations. Fiona and Francis direct two funerals.
9	3	Susan Leonard	28 January 2019
The staff direct the funeral of an honored kaumatua whose body has been flown in from Dunedin.
10	4	Susan Leonard	4 February 2019
Francis trains a new staff member in funeral direction. The staff direct the funeral of a young Fijian woman.
11	5	Susan Leonard	11 February 2019
Francis's efforts to alter the incorrect appearance of the husband of a grieving widow show his dedication to his customers and his respect for the traditions of their cultures.
12	6	Susan Leonard	18 February 2019
Fiona directs the funeral of a Niuean man. The staff attempts yoga and meditation as a team-building exercise.
13	7	Susan Leonard	25 February 2019
Viewers see more of the process of how death is handled culturally as a funeral case requires special attention from the embalmer.
14	8	Susan Leonard	4 March 2019
Can Kaiora prevent Francis from making yet another terrible vehicle purchase?

=== Season 3 ===
No. overall	No. in season	Directed by	Original release date
15	1	Susan Leonard	5 January 2020
Husband and wife team Francis and Kaiora Tipene juggle the newest member of their team as they care for a well loved sportsman who dies suddenly, and a brave father arranging his own funeral.
16	2	Susan Leonard	12 January 2020
Francis plans his biggest surprise yet for Kaiora for their wedding anniversary. Kaiora arranges a special funeral with a procession of Harleys, and a young man's life ends tragically.
17	3	Susan Leonard	19 January 2020
Francis and Kaiora take a road trip to his home marae, and we are gifted a rare glimpse of the three day tangihanga process as his dear Aunty is laid to rest.
18	4	Susan Leonard	26 January 2020
Kaiora is confronted by a very special case, and a Returned Serviceman receives a gun salute at his funeral. Meanwhile, Francis is obsessed with the chapel reaching new heights of perfection..
19	5	Susan Leonard	2 February 2020
Nona convinces the staff to try zumba for a good cause. Meanwhile, an elderly woman delays her own funeral, and Francis is surprised by a glamorous family breaking traditions on the marae.
20	6	Susan Leonard	9 February 2020
Francis grapples with who is his number one amongst the staff. A beloved mother passes away at home, and one of Francis' cousins says goodbye to the neighbour who raised her as her own.
21	7	Susan Leonard	16 February 2020
Nona farewells a close family member and the youngest daughter of ten organises her father's funeral. Meanwhile, Francis goes to great lengths to tidy the messiest office, in his opinion.
22	8	Susan Leonard	23 February 2020
Francis tries to introduce healthy work practices but gets in way over his head. A woman returns home to one of the most sacred mountains in Maoridom, and Denise helps a family farewell their father.

=== Season 4 ===
No. overall	No. in season	Directed by	Original release date
23	1	Unknown	15 March 2021
Francis and Kaiora navigate the difficulties of supporting grieving whānau during COVID-19 while operating under strict guidelines. Plus, with the mortuary now up and running, the funeral home has a flamboyant new staff member.
24	2	Unknown	22 March 2021
With Tipene Funerals storing bodies during COVID-19, Francis goes on a shopping spree to decorate the freezer. Later, the loss of a young mother resonates through her community.
26	3	Unknown	29 March 2021
Francis instigates an unusual team building exercise and Nona directs the emotional funeral of a family friend.
27	4	Unknown	5 April 2021
The death of a young teenager hits home for the Tipenes and a Kaiora upgrades one of Francis’ favourite toys.
28	5	Unknown	19 April 2021
Francis considers an unusual way of celebrating his Tongan whakapapa. Jay deals with the emotional toll of embalming a three-month-old pepi.
29	6	Unknown	26 April 2021
A whanau trip to Queenstown is interrupted when Kaiora is called north to care for a dearly loved Aunty.
30	7	Unknown	3 May 2021
The staff pull together to remember a man with no family. Plus, Francis and Kaiora take a leap of faith, opening a new branch in Porirua.
31	8	Unknown	10 May 2021
No episode overview.

=== Season 5 ===
No. overall	No. in season	Directed by	Original release date
32	1	Unknown	19 April 2022
Francis, Kaiora and the Tipene Funeral whanau are back for another season of laughter and aroha. This season they continue to navigate Covid-19 and their new Porirua location.
33	2	Unknown	26 April 2022
Francis and the Porirua staff rehearse songs for a promotional performance at a local rest home which provides lots of laughs and delights the residents.
34	3	Unknown	3 May 2022
Francis acquires yet another gym membership and struggles through his first PT session. Feleki trains as an embalmer and news of a further lockdown has devastating consequences.
35	4	Unknown	10 May 2022
A power outage challenges Jay in the mortuary, while Covid restrictions mean families need to get creative to grieve their loved ones.
36	5	Unknown	17 May 2022
Francis and Kaiora Tipene are the passionate proprietors of Tipene Funerals. Join them behind the scenes, addressing our culture's last taboo with dignity and aroha.
37	6	Unknown	24 May 2022
The death of a beloved Tipene whanau member is complicated by Francis' health issues.
38	7	Unknown	31 May 2022
Francis and Kaiora Tipene are the passionate proprietors of Tipene Funerals. Join them behind the scenes, addressing our culture's last taboo with dignity and aroha.
39	8	Unknown	7 June 2022
It's Kaiora's birthday and the staff lay on a surprise lunch - however the terrible shock that awaits them all will send celebrations crashing.

=== Season 6 ===
No. overall	No. in season	Directed by	Original release date
40	1	Unknown	9 October 2023
Jay and Francis take care of Stephen Watson and his beloved cat Smoochie. Tamale straddles the line between profession and family when he directs the funeral of his cousin Toni Va’enuku.
41	2	Unknown	16 October 2023
There's a hole in the wall and it's Francis' fault, with his attempt at breakfast falling flat. Joan Whitford and Mr. Mulivai are farewelled by their loved ones.
42	3	Unknown	23 October 2023
Yet more new décor to deal with & everyone gets together for a shared Matariki kai. There are ghosts that need attention. Jack Taumaunu and Tagisia Sanelevi are farewelled by their loved ones.
43	4	Unknown	30 October 2023
Francis offers to get on his knees to help lay floor tiles & the Stanley Neho Function Centre opens with a big celebration.
44	5	Unknown	6 November 2023
The Queen is dead & Francis, desperate to be a part of the funeral, offers his services to Buckingham Palace officials. Baby Tevita Moeaki and Deon Hadley are mourned by their families.
45	6	Unknown	13 November 2023
World famous Tipene Funerals get surprise visitors from the USA and Francis is frustrated yet again by Fiona's tardiness. The families of Mr Chen and Mrs.Simoe Solomona grieve their loss.
46	7	Unknown	20 November 2023
The next generation of the Tipene dynasty is in the whare earning his keep. Pere Wihongi fulfils a long held dream for Francis & Kaiora. John Te Wake & Sylvia King are mourned by their loved ones.
47	8	Unknown	27 November 2023
The whānau travel to Fiji to visit someone special & witness the funeral of a family member. There's a joyful surprise & emotional celebration.
