= Radio Kuka =

Radio Kuka is a mockumentary style, reality TV spin-off from the show Deane Waretini: Now is the hour created by NZ based production company, Scotty Productions. On 7 November 2014, Radio Kuka aired its pilot for audiences of Māori Television with pleasing critical review.

Radio Kuka is produced by Orlando Stewart, who also stars in the pilot as a self-titled, clumsy Pākeha insensitive to the Māori language objective of the Avondale-based AM radio station. He is well known for similar antics featured in a similar styled show about Deane Waretini (aired in 2012) who rose to fame in 1981 with the Māori language hit "The Bridge". Stewart's comedic acting ability is also seen in the 2006 series about Manurewa based singer, Wayne Anderson titled "Wayne Anderson Singer of Songs".

Radio Kuka features veteran NZ actor, comedian and presenter Pio Terei, alongside broadcaster and teacher Marire Kuka as station manager, Tuhoe Tamaiparea as the intern and Katarina Gordon as the business manager. Radio Kuka is narrated by internationally acclaimed Aotearoa actress, Rachel House (Moana, White Lies, Boy).

In 2015, Radio Kuka is yet to produce a complete series for its fans.
