= 2026 New Zealand budget =

Government budget for fiscal year 2026/27

- Submitted by: Nicola Willis
- Presented: 28 May 2026
- Country: New Zealand
- Parliament: 54th
- Party: National
- Website: https://budget.govt.nz/

Budget 2026 (Māori: Tahua 2026) is the New Zealand budget for fiscal year 2026/27 that was presented to the New Zealand House of Representatives by Finance Minister Nicola Willis, on 28 May 2026. This was the third budget passed by the Sixth National Government.

== Background ==
On 25 May 2026, Prime Minister Christopher Luxon told Radio New Zealand's Morning Report programme that the 2026 budget would be a "grown-up" one and "free of any lolly scramble" unlike previous budgets released by the Sixth Labour Government, whom he described as "babysitters." That same day, Luxon reiterated the Government's fiscally conservative message during his morning interview with Newstalk ZB, saying:

"You have to get the show gripped up, you have to be financially responsible, be the grown-ups and the adults here, having taken over from the babysitters."

During the Budget lock-up on 28 May, Finance Minister Nicola Willis described Budget 2026 as "not glamorous work," indicating a lack of tax relief and that the budget would focus on "tough love" and "responsible spending." During the 2026 Budget Speech, Willis said that the Government's "responsible approach" to spending would allow the New Zealand economy to return to surplus by 2028/29. She said the strained "rules-based global system" had led countries to boost their defence spending. Willis also acknowledged the impact of the 2026 Iran war on petrol and diesel prices for households and businesses. Willis also warned that the New Zealand Government was facing a significant burden of debt amounting to $9 billion in interest each year. She also said that New Zealand needed to reduce its debt due to its negative sovereign debt rating from Fitch Ratings and Moody's. Willis also rejected the idea of using "election-year band-aids and sugar hits" to "bribe voters," and said that the Government would focus on "getting the books in order."

== Major announcements ==
The Government reduced the budget's operational allowance from NZ$2.4 billion to $2.1 billion, while raising capital spending to $5.7 billion. The 2026 Budget contained $3.8 billion in new spending offset by $1.7 billion in savings.

=== Defence and intelligence ===
Allocated $2.3 billion in capital funding and $1.2 billion in operational funding towards defence and intelligence.

- Allocating funding to retain existing New Zealand Defence Force personnel and to attract recruits to new specific areas.
- Investing $158 million in military drone systems, maintaining Anzac-class frigates and HMNZS Canterbury, and replacing the Royal New Zealand Navy's ageing fleet.
- Allocating funding to improving facilities at military bases.
- Allocating funding to ensure the continual operation of air, land and naval forces and assets.

=== Education ===
Allocated $2 billion in education spending.

- Raising school operating grants by 2% in 2027 and early childhood subsidies by 1.5% from July 2026.
- Providing a 2% increase to subsidies for tertiary foundation courses and $284 million more to subsidise more student places between 2027 and 2028.
- Allocating $131 million from the 2026 budget into boosting literacy and mathematics for primary and intermediate children.
- Investing $559 million in school property development and roll growth.
- Investing $470 million in capital funding to redevelop up to 10 schools, build 232 additional classrooms, and purchase land for new schools.
- Allocating $74 million to supporting the implementation of a refreshed curriculum and new national qualifications.
- Allocating $212 million from the 2026 budget to continuing the Healthy School Lunches programme for the 2027 school year. Associate education minister David Seymour has indicated that the Government would make changes to the programme for the 2028 school year.
- Scrapping the Fees Free scheme for final year university students.
- Allocating $405 million to the tertiary education sector.
- Investing $25 million to boost funding rates for foundation education providers.
- Allocating $87 million to 1,000 more "Youth Guarantee" places to provide free learning for young people with few or no qualifications.
- Investing $69 million to double the number of Trades Academy places to 20,000 for high school students.
- Allocating $61 million in curriculum resources.
- Allocating for $20 million for teacher professional development and delivering the new curriculum.

=== Energy security and fuel response ===
Allocated $198 million to energy security.

- From 7 April, the Government granted a $50 in-work tax credit to 143,000 working families with children to help with rising fuel costs caused by the 2026 Iran war. Another 14,000 families became eligible for a lower tax credit. While beneficiaries and pensioners were ineligible for the tax credit, their payments were adjusted from 1st April per procedure. The tax relief package was estimated to cost NZ$373 million for a year and was funded from the Government's operational allowance for the 2026 budget.
- Allocating $48 million from the 2026 Budget to cover potential losses from helping businesses transition from gas to alternative energy sources such as electricity or bio energy. Under the energy transition initiative, the Government would guarantee 80% of eligible bank loans (an estimated $1.2 billion) to allow banks to offer lower interest rates for companies switching from gas to alternative energy sources.
- Allocating $150 million for additional strategic fuel reserves to strengthen fuel resilience.
- Allocating $24 million in a temporary increase in mileage rates for support workers and patients traveling for specialist treatments.
- Allocating $450 million for additional temporary fuel-related measures as a "rainy day fund."

=== Foreign affairs ===
- Investing $110 million in international development assistance, with a focus on the Pacific Islands.
- Investing $145 million in protecting New Zealand diplomatic and trade missions abroad.

=== Health ===
Allocated $5.8 billion in health spending (including $5.5 billion to frontline services).

- Allocating $35 million over the next four years to strengthening ambulance road services in order to improve patient care and support for frontline health staff. Key initiatives include establishing two new ambulance hubs in Auckland, recruiting more staff and upgrading technology.
- Investing $34 million in three day postnatal stays. The Government also confirmed plans to amend existing health legislation to grant woman a legal entitlement for a 72-hour postnatal stay at hospitals and other maternity facilities.
- Investing $15.5 million over the next four years in establishing a national pediatric palliative care service, which will consist of teams across the North and South Islands. This would supplement the sole specialist pediatric care physician at Auckland's Starship Children's Hospital.
- Investing $54 million in the drug purchasing agency Pharmac.
- Investing $33 million to lowering the bowel cancer screening age to 56 years, making 200,000 more New Zealanders eligible for the programme.
- Investing $682 million in capital investment including a new tower block at Whangarei Hospital and buying land for the new Drury hospital.
  - Investing $180 million (including $128 million in operational funding and $52 million in capital funding) over the next four years to improving healthcare services in the Otago Central Lakes area. This investment includes expanding the emergency department of the Lakes District Hospital in Queenstown.
- Investing $930 million in purchasing new clinical equipment, tech upgrades and facility improvements.

=== Housing ===
Allocated $430 million to housing initiatives.

- Investing $400 million over the next four years to launch a new financial incentive for local councils to promote housing growth.

=== Law and order ===
Allocated 1.07 billion to law and order.

- Investing $70 million in purchasing three new unmanned underwater vehicles (UUVs) for the purpose of combating maritime smuggling. These UUVS will conduct checks below the waterline, reducing the need for diving crews.
- Investing $503 million in frontline Corrections services including resources to manage prison expansion.
- Allocating $215 million in capital investment to building new courthouses in Rotorua ($100 million) and new police stations in Whanganui and Greymouth. One of the new Rotorua courthouses will be used for the High Court, District Court, Coroners Court and tribunals while the second will be used for the Rotorua Māori Land Court.
- Allocating $50 million to supporting frontline Police services.
- Allocating funding to reforming the police firearms safety system.
- Allocating $21 million to the New Zealand Customs Service to combating drug smuggling and transnational crime.

=== Māori ===
- Allocating $48 million over the next four years to supporting the sustainability of Māori language broadcasting by helping Māori media organisations adapt to digitisation and produce Māori-language content. Earlier, Te Māngai Pāho's (the Māori Broadcasting Funding Agency) chair Reikura Kahi, chief executive Larry Parr and National Party MP Greg Fleming had lobbied the Government against reducing the agency's funding by $16 million (25 percent).
- Allocating $10 million from the Māori Development Fund to Te Māori Manaaki Taonga Trust, to promote international interest in Māori culture, creativity and storytelling.
- Allocating $8m towards aquaculture settlement obligations under the Māori Commercial Aquaculture Claims Settlement Act.

=== Public sector transformation ===
- Slashing 8,700 public sector jobs over the next three years to deliver $2.4 billion in savings. This is expected to reduce the 63,000 public service workforce by 14%. The public service overhaul would also involve the reduction of the number of government departments and increasing the use of artificial intelligence and other digital tools.
- $424 million worth of savings to re-prioritise frontline services.
- Reducing the Ministry for Culture and Heritage's funding by $27 million.
- Reducing the Ministry of Social Development's funding by $410.23 million over the next four years. These cuts will affect support services for emergency housing, employment services for solo parents and lowering the temporary additional support rate. The Ministry received $454.21 million in extra funding, with priority being given to upgrading the SuperGold Card.
- Reducing the Public Service Commission's funding by $4.41 million through staffing cuts.
- Reducing the Ministry for Regulation's funding by $1.6 million through savings on consultancy costs.
- Reducing the Ministry for Disabled People's funding by $1.46 million through restructuring its operating model and investing in artificial intelligence.
- Reducing Te Puni Kokiri's (the Ministry for Māori Development) funding by $23.6 million by reducing staffing numbers, contractor and consultancy costs.
- Reducing the Ministry for Pacific Peoples' funding by $2.8 million through staffing and operational changes.
- Reducing public broadcaster Radio New Zealand's budget by another $1.4 million, in addition to the $4.6 million annual reduction announced in the 2025 Budget.

=== Social housing and welfare ===
Allocated $824 million to social housing and welfare.

- Increasing the accommodation supplement for people in private rentals and raising income-related rents for social housing tenants.
- Boosting weekly social housing support to 110,000 families by $15 while reducing support to another 80,000 families by $30 weekly. Introducing more stringent criteria for obtaining social housing including new tenancy duration limits and regular check-ins.
- Investing $69.2 million into supporting between 1,800 and 2,250 more social homes.
- Lowering the maximum rates for "Temporary Additional Support" from 30% to 25%, achieving $196 million in savings.
- Investing $22.4 million to help reduce the number of households entering emergency housing.
- Allocating funding to help solo parent beneficiaries enter the workforce.
- Allocating $45 million to food banks and school breakfast programmes.

=== Taxation ===
- Introducing a new 1% prudential levy on banks, insurers and other financial industry companies to cover the cost of services provided by the Reserve Bank of New Zealand. This is expected to generate $200 million in tax revenue over the next four years.
- Removing the "ute tax" requirement for owners of private motor vehicles to keep detailed logbooks.
- Raising the net income a not-for-profit entity can earn without paying tax from $1,000 to $10,000.
- Capping tax eligible donations at $100,000 per year, translating to a maximum tax credit of $33,333 per annum.
- Introducing a tax on outstanding loans companies have made to their shareholders if the loans remain unpaid six months after a company is delisted from the Companies Register. This is expected to raise $146 million in tax revenue over the next four years.
- Investing $15 million in the Inland Revenue Department's debt compliance activities.
- Raising the tax threshold for foreign investment funds from $50,000 to $100,000, allowing investors to keep more funds.

=== Transport ===
Allocated $477 million to transport.

- Investing $1.773 billion in the Cambridge to Piarere extension of the dual-carriage Waikato Expressway.
- Investing $400 million in capital funding to a series of state highway "resilience upgrades."
- Investing $705 million in capital funding and $477 million in operating funding to maintain and upgrade the national rail transport network.

=== Other initiatives ===
- Allocating an extra $79 million to the National Wilding Conifer Control Programme over the next three years, bringing the total amount spent on that programme to $109 million.
- Investing $2.9 billion in funding to the Superannuation Fund.
- Investing $36 million to make the SuperGold Card an official form of photo identification.
- Allocating Oranga Tamariki (the Ministry for Children) $184 million to protect and support children.
- Allocating funding for new technology to upgrade New Zealand's emergency response system.

== Responses ==
=== Political ===
==== Support ====
In late March 2026, the allied New Zealand First and ACT parties welcomed the tax credits as "sensible and proportionate."

On Budget Day, ACT leader David Seymour praised the 2026 Budget for "ending years of wasteful spending and restoring discipline to the government's books." National MP and Minister for Māori Development Tama Potaka praised the 2026 Budget for "ensuring te reo Māori remains strong, visible and enduring for future generations."

==== Opposition ====
The opposition Labour and Green parties criticised the Government's budget-funded April tax credits as insufficient for helping beneficiaries, carers, retirees and encouraging public transportation. In response to Finance Minister Nicola Willis's pre-budget announcement on 19 May that the Government would seek to lay off 8,700 public servants over the next three years, Labour leader Chris Hipkins said that the proposed job cuts would lead to unemployment and affect the delivery of frontline government services such as social workers, correctional officers, border security, and conservation workers.

Following the 2026 Budget Speech on 28 May, opposition parties criticised the 2026 Budget. Labour leader Hipkins said: "Under National, New Zealand pays for Luxon's cuts. Cuts that don't work and will bring immediate pain and make the economy smaller." Similarly, Labour's finance spokesperson Barbara Edmonds said the 2026 budget did not address rising costs, adding that "families are choosing between expensive food and expensive fuel, tapping into their retirement savings just to stay afloat now."

Greens co-leader Chlöe Swarbrick said that the 2026 Budget was proof "that Luxon's government has no hope, no plan, no ambition and no vision for our country" while fellow co-leader Marama Davidson said "the people who could least afford it were those being asked to pay for the budget." Davidson also accused the Government of abandoning its Treaty of Waitangi obligations in favour of the "super rich and landlords."

Te Pāti Māori criticised the 2026 Budget for allegedly "deprioritising Māori aspirations" while funding defence, prisons and infrastructure, citing a $136 million reduction in Māori developmental funding. The party's co-leader Rawiri Waititi also linked the 2026 Budget to rising unemployment, increasing living costs, growing inequality and the Government's privatisation agenda, saying "This is a story of the have-nots and the have-yachts." Similarly, independent MP Takuta Ferris said the 2026 Budget showed that the Government was "more interested in managing the symptoms of inequality rather than transforming it," citing the Government's focus on defence and prison spending at the expense of addressing Māori housing insecurity, mental health pressures and poverty.

=== Academic and media commentary ===
University of Waikato economics lecturer Dr Michael Ryan opined that the National-led coalition government's decision to trim the government's operational allowance from NZ$2.4 billion to $2.1 billion was motivated by political priorities rather than meeting New Zealand's economic and strategic needs.

Te Ao Māori News correspondent Māni Dunlop expressed concern about the limited number of Māori-targeted housing initiatives despite the over-representation of insecure and emergency housing. Similarly, Māori economist Matt Roskruge expressed concern about that Maori-specific initiatives and equity funding were being scaled back or merged into universal programmes despite Maori experiencing significant disparities in health, housing, education and income. Liam Rātana of The Spinoff observed that the 2026 Budget boosted Māori media and language programmes while not addressing Māori healthcare, poverty and social problems.

=== Civil society ===
During her acceptance speech at the 2026 Aotearoa Music Awards held on 28 May, Dame Lynda Topp criticised the $2.1 billion allocated to defence spending in the 2026 Budget, saying "We need support for artists in this country. We need a government that says the arts is more important than the defence budget." That same night, university students including Victoria University of Wellington Students' Association president Aidan Donoghue gathered outside Parliament to protest the Government's budgetary decision to axe the Fees Free policy at the end of 2026 and to allow tertiary institutions to raise their tuition fees by six percent.
