= It's in the Bag (game show) =

- Genre: Game show
- Presented by: Selwyn Toogood (1954-86); John Hawkesby (1986-90); Nick Tansley (1992); Pio Terei and Stacey Morrison (2009-2013)
- Country of origin: New Zealand

Original release
- Network: NZBC; TVNZ; Māori Television
- Release: 1954 – 1973
- Release: 1973 – 1992
- Release: 2009 – 2013

It's in the Bag was a long-running New Zealand radio and, later, television game show, screened on TVNZ. The show began on radio in 1954 and was hosted and directed by Selwyn Toogood. In 1973 a television version of the show was developed which was also hosted by Toogood until his retirement in the 1980s. After his retirement, John Hawkesby took over hosting duties. The show was discontinued in 1990 but brought back in 1992 under Robin Scholes of independent production house Communicado, with Nick Tansley as host and Suzy Aiken (now Suzy Clarkson) as hostess.

Toogood's catch phrases from this show included "by hokey!", "what should he/she do, New Zealand?" and "the money or the bag?"

The hostesses of the show also became popular celebrities. The hostess' role was to introduce the contestants and announce and fetch the prizes. Hostess of the last part of the radio era and first television hostess was Heather Eggleton. Other hostesses of the television era included Tineke Stephenson (formerly Tineke Bouchier) and Hilary Timmins.

== The game ==
Unlike other game shows instead of being filmed in a single studio the show went on the road to a different town each week and the set was assembled into a local community town hall. The contestants were locals selected from the audience by a pre-show qualifying process.

During the show, each contestant would be called onto the stage and asked three relatively easy questions. If all three questions were answered correctly, the contestant had the chance to play for "the money or the bag". The contestant would first be asked to select one of thirty different bags. Each bag contained a prize unknown to both the contestant and the host. The prizes ranged in value from moderate to valuable, and also included three 'booby prizes' of negligible value, such as a clothes peg. The top bag was known as Super Bag. This bag contained a prize of high value, or several items equally a high value. There was just one Super Bag.

The host of the show would then offer the contestant an increasing amount of cash in exchange for their unopened bag. The offers would continue until the contestant either accepted the cash or the host chose to stop offering more money. If they chose the bag, it would be opened at that point and their prize revealed. If the contestant chose the money the prize the contestant turned down would be revealed.

In the television version of the show, the final round was the 'Travel Bag' round in which one of the previously-appearing contestants would be randomly selected to compete. In this round, the contestant would be asked ten quite difficult questions. The contestant who had answered the most correctly at the end of each season would win the prize – a valuable travel-related prize such as a round-the-world trip, a matching set of travel luggage, and video camera.

The last segment of the show consisted of the host going into the audience and selecting a participant. That lucky person would not be asked any questions but would otherwise participate in the normal bag selection and bidding process. The show also contained a Post Bag segment at the start where viewers across all of New Zealand would mail in a cash bid by post. An entry would be drawn on the show with the "Money or the Bag" process run through until the offer by the presenter exceeded the bid in which case the entrant would take the money, or until the presenter reached a limit and in this case the entrant would take the prize in the bag. In the final 1992 series Post Bag was replaced by Phone Bag contestants now phoned in their bids to an 0900 number prior to the show, an entry was still drawn on each show with the process the same as the Post Bag.

== Return to TV ==
Television New Zealand's new TVNZ 6 channel began screenings of selected Selwyn Toogood and John Hawkesby episodes when the channel began transmission on the new Freeview service on 30 September 2007.

== Revival ==
In 2009 Māori Television began a new revival of the show, hosted by Pio Terei and Stacey Morrison. The first episode went to air on 31 May 2009.
