= Māori Television Service =

The Māori Television Service (abbr. MTS; Māori: Te Aratuku Whakāta Irirangi Māori) is a state sector organisation in New Zealand that was established on 7 May 2003 under the Māori Television Service (Te Aratuku Whakaata Irirangi Māori) Act 2003 to replace the Te Reo Māori Television Trust (Te Awhiorangi). The service's primary function is to promote the language te reo Māori me nga tikanga Māori.

Like the Reserve Bank of New Zealand, the television service has, according to the State Services Commission, an unusual status as a stand-alone agency within the State sector that does not fall under any State sector category. While established by statute (the Maori Television Service Act 2003), it is not a Crown entity in any shape or form. The Act, however, does make the Service accountable in much the same way as Crown entities. The principal reason for this approach is that the Maori Television Service is a partnership between the Crown and Maori. Maori interests were represented by Te Putahi Paho (the Maori Electoral College) who appointed four members of the Television Service's seven member board. The remaining three board members were appointed by the Government. Now Māori interests are represented by Te Mātāwai (a legislative group comprising representatives from Māori organisations and iwi).

The Maori Television Service receives the bulk of its funding from the government via Vote Maori Affairs. Funding is provided directly to the service for its operational administrative costs. Programming is funded by Te Mangai Paho (The Maori Broadcasting Commission). The Service is able to commission its own programming from advertising funds.

Māori Television started broadcasting in 2004. It was renamed Whakaata Māori in 2022. It is available on the UHF band to approximately four-fifths of Māori speakers, and to all New Zealand SKY Television satellite service subscribers. It is also available on the Freeview satellite service.
