= Annabelle Lee-Mather =

New Zealand television journalist and producer

Annabelle Lee-Mather is a New Zealand television journalist and producer. She affiliates to Ngāi Tahu, Ngāti Kahungunu and Kāti Māmoe iwi.

== Biography ==
Lee-Mather began her media career in radio in 2001, working for Ruia Mai, which provided news and current affairs programming to iwi radio stations. She moved to TV in 2004, working on te reo Māori news show Te Kāea for Māori Television. She worked for the broadcaster for 11 years, including executive producing current affairs show Native Affairs. In 2013, while working on that show with Mihingarangi Forbes, the pair investigated complaints of financial mismanagement at Te Kōhanga Reo, a Māori immersion programme for preschool-age children, which led to a political intervention in the organisation. Shortly after the investigation, both Lee-Mather and Forbes left Māori Television.

Lee-Mather and Forbes formed the Aotearoa Media Collective, which has produced programmes like Hongi To Hāngī, New Zealand Wars and Three's weekly Māori current affairs show, The Hui. Lee-Mather was producer of The Hui until the end of 2022. Lee-Mather is also head of indigenous projects at Great Southern Television where she created the shows The Casketeers and Shearing Shed. Alongside host Toby Manhire of The Spinoff, she appears on the podcast, "Gone By Lunchtime" with Ben Thomas.

=== Awards and recognition ===
- Best Current Affairs Programme (with Rewa Harriman, Mihingarangi Forbes and Philip Smith): The Hui at 2021 New Zealand Television Awards
- Images & Sound Award for Success in Television and Digital at 2020 Women in Film and Television New Zealand Awards
- Te Māngai Paho Best Māori Programme (shared with Mihingarangi Forbes, Mahanga Pihama, Philip Smith and Deb Cope): NZ Wars – Stories of Waitara at 2020 New Zealand Television Awards
- Best Original Reality Series (shared with Carmen J Leonard, Susan Leonard, and Philip Smith): The Casketeers at 2019 New Zealand Television Awards
- Best Māori Programme (shared with Carmen J Leonard, Susan Leonard and Philip Smith): The Casketeers at 2019 New Zealand Television Awards
- Best Documentary (shared with Mihingarangi Forbes, Carmen J Leonard, Colin McCrae and Adrian Stevanon): NZ Wars: The Stories of Ruapekapeka at 2018 New Zealand Television Awards
- Best Māori Programme (shared with Mihingarangi Forbes, Carmen J Leonard, Colin McCrae and Adrian Stevanon): NZ Wars: The Stories of Ruapekapeka at 2018 New Zealand Television Awards
- Best Original Reality Series: The Casketeers at 2018 New Zealand Television Awards
- Best Māori Programme (shared with Adrian Stevanon and Mihingarangi Forbes): The Hui at 2017 New Zealand Television Awards
- Best Investigative Reporting (shared with Adrian Stevanon, Richard Langston and Mihingarangi Forbes) for: Native Affairs, Feathering the Nest episode at 2014 World Indigenous Journalism Awards
- Best Current Affairs Series: Native Affairs at 2011 Aotearoa Film and Television Awards

== Personal life ==
Lee-Mather is the daughter of politician Sandra Lee-Vercoe.
