= Hilary Timmins =

New Zealand television presenter

Hilary Timmins is a New Zealand television presenter who began her television career in 1986 as a co-host of the game show It's in the Bag. She later appeared on other New Zealand television programmes and was associated with the New Zealand Lotto from 1992 to 2008, fronting its weekly live draw and contributing to other aspects of its production.

Timmins later wrote and directed Dream Catchers, a television educational series about New Zealanders living in the United Kingdom, for which she received a Points of Light award.

== Career ==
Timmins first appeared on New Zealand Television in 1986 after studying English literature and ancient history at Auckland University coupled with a busy modelling career – when she began her co-hosting role of the iconic NZ game show It’s in the Bag.

Born in New Zealand to Scottish parents, Timmins went on to become a household name, appearing on many successful television shows for an unbroken 22 years.

In 1992, Timmins began her long association with the New Zealand Lotto; a relationship that continued until 2008 when she left to travel abroad. In addition to scripting and creating aspects of the production, she fronted the weekly live Lotto Draw during this period. Her involvement with Lotto also stretched to the directing of many community grants and celebrity inserts, as well as appearing in numerous brand commercials and fronting sponsorship and promotional campaign including the America's Cup and Festival of New Zealand.

She also worked constantly as a guest speaker and host of corporate and black tie fundraisers, public and civic functions, as well as high-profile product endorsement and commercials.

Timmins has been actively involved in community and charity work. She was the Chief Celebrity Ambassador for Variety New Zealand and has worked as an ambassador for Skylight children's charity and Victim Support. She has interviewed many celebrities and personalities including Michael Crawford, Dannii Minogue, Christina Aguilera, Jewell, Vanessa May, Jimeoin, Russell Watson and Jonah Lomu. She is also known for filming “It’s In The Bag” from Scott Base, Antarctica, co-anchoring various telethons, hosting and performing as a singer for the Live Lotto Draw in front of a crowd of 250,000 at Xmas in the Park, Auckland and Christchurch, being New Zealand's first female game-show host on Telebingo, and sailing during elimination races on the New Zealand America's Cup yacht "Black Magic".

Timmins lives in London and recently wrote and directed the TV and educational series "Dream Catchers", a series about inspirational New Zealanders in the UK for which she received a Points of Light award from the then British Prime Minister Teresa May. The series also featured as part of the Oceania exhibition at the Royal Academy and is used in NZ schools as a careers guide. She is currently occupied with new writing projects. Timmins is married to New Zealand film producer/financier Robert Whitehouse.

== See also ==
- List of New Zealand television personalities
