= Te Māngai Pāho =

New Zealand funding body of Māori media

- Māori Broadcast Funding Agency

Autonomous Crown Entity overview
- Formed: 1989
- Headquarters: Wellington, New Zealand
- Autonomous Crown Entity executive: Larry Parr, Chief Executive
- Key document: Broadcasting Amendment Act 1994
- Website: tmp.govt.nz

Te Māngai Pāho (the Māori Broadcast Funding Agency) is the New Zealand Crown entity responsible for the promotion of the Māori language and Māori culture by providing funding for Māori-language programming on radio and television.

== Mandate and functions ==
In 1989 the Broadcasting Act established the Te Reo Whakapuaki Irirangi. Then the Broadcasting Amendment Act 1993 established Te Reo Whakapuaki Irirangi, known as Te Māngai Pāho in 1994.

The organisation was established and is retained under the commitment of successive Governments to broadcasting rights under the Treaty of Waitangi, and recognises the Māori language as a taonga that must be actively protected and supported. It claims to be "dedicated to the sustained regeneration and promotion of Māori language and culture" through making wise investment decisions, contestable funding processes and the promotion of Māori music. It operates alongside general broadcasting funding body NZ On Air.

As the primary funding body of Māori media, the agency funds the operation of a national network of 21 iwi-run radio stations, that must each deliver eight hours of Māori language content each day. It also provides funding to Māori Television and sister channel Te Reo to produce local programming in-house and acquire local and overseas programmes that are likely to interest Māori audiences in particular.

== History ==
One of its earliest accolades as an independent body was funding Aotearoa Television Network, a UHF Māori channel in Auckland. However, its available budget for the station was limited, hindering its growth.

In early October 2025, the Minister of Māori Development Tama Potaka appointed Reikura Kahi as Te Māngai Pāho's chair and Kingi Kiriona as deputy chair.

In early December 2025, Te Māngai Pāho's chair Kahi and chief executive Larry Parr met with members of the New Zealand Parliament's Māori affairs select committee to lobby the Sixth National Government against cutting NZ$16 million worth of time-limited funding to the agency during the 2026 New Zealand budget. She and Parr described the proposed cuts (which amounted to 25% of the agency's budget) as "catastrophic" for the Māori language and the Māori media sector. National Party MP Greg Fleming reiterated his support for Te Māngai Pāho and said he would lobby Prime Minister Christopher Luxon to maintain strong funding to the Māori broadcast funding agency. By contrast, associate finance minister and ACT party leader David Seymour argued against public funding for the media and said that the cuts did not go "far enough."

In late May 2026, the New Zealand Government allocated $48 million from the 2026 New Zealand budget over the next four years to supporting the sustainability of Māori language broadcasting by helping Māori media organisations adapt to digitisation and produce Māori-language content. In mid-June 2026, The Spinoff reported that Te Māngai Pāho was offering NZ$18.5 million through its Mōhiohio funding round for iwi radio stations and Whakaata Māori to produce Māori language news bulletins over 250 week days. Official documents also outlined plans to establish a new national news hub called Te Iho, which would be led by Whakaata Māori.

== Identity ==
When Te Māngai Pāho became autonomous in 1994, it began using a sting to end the television programmes it funds. The first, Toitū, was commissioned by Cinco Cine. This was replaced in 2002 by a new one, He Mea Tautoko for the impending arrival of Māori Television. This was finally dropped in 2022, being replaced by the current one, Ko Te Reo Te Take. By using a metaphor of Ranginui and Papatūānuku separating their parents in space, the agency sees it as part of the move not only from linear television to streaming, but also from analogue technologies (film and tape) to digital.

== Television ==
TVNZ 1, TVNZ 2, Three, Prime TV and Sky TV programming is eligible for Te Māngai Pāho funding. The agency has previously funded bilingual content, outdoor broadcasts of Māori events, sports coverage with Māori language commentaries, Māori language children's programming, daily news and current affairs and other programmes.

=== TVNZ Māori and Pacific ===
Flagship daily Māori language news programme Te Karere began in 1983 and has been funded by Te Māngai Pāho since its inception in 1989. The programme covers news of national significance that relates to a specifically Māori audience. It is presented by Scotty Morrison and produced by Tini Molyneux and Tina Wickliffe. The programme broadcasts on TVNZ 1 at 3:55 pm, and is repeated with subtitles at 1 am and 5:35 am the following day, and is available online through live streaming and on-demand services.

Until the end of 2014, the TVNZ Māori and Pacific department operated primarily to produce programmes that have received Te Māngai Pāho funding. Long-running bi-lingual current affairs programme Marae was one such programme. Presenters Scottie Morrison and Miriama Kamo introduced debates and panel discussions about Māori politics and longer-form stories about the Māori world. For most of its existence, the programme has been broadcast alongside English-subtitled Māori language documentary series Waka Huia, which was distributed around the world as an archival record of the Māori way of life.

=== Whakaata Māori ===
Whakaata Māori (formerly Māori Television) began broadcasting around New Zealand 28 March 2004 from a base in Newmarket, and makes a significant contribution to the revitalisation of the Māori language and culture through its programming. Its mission under legislation is to revitalise Māori language and culture through providing high-quality, cost-effective Māori television, in both Māori and English languages, in a way that informs, educates, and entertains a broad viewing audience and therefore enriches New Zealand's society, culture, and heritage.

The flagship Māori Television attracts 1.5 million viewers each month, half of all Māori aged five or more, and one third of all New Zealanders. Current affairs show Native Affairs, sports coverage and international films and documentaries are among the highest-rating programmes on the channel.

Te Reo is the company's second channel, launched 28 March 2008. Its contents are entirely in the Māori language with no advertising or subtitles, with many programmes being iwi-specific or geared towards fluent Māori language speakers. It also rebroadcasts or simulcasts many of Māori Television's Māori language programming, including daily news programme Te Kaea.

== Radio ==
Te Māngai Pāho funds the operation of a network of bilingual English and Māori language radio stations targeting members of local iwi and the wider public through local frequencies and online streaming. It operates as Te Whakaruruhau o Ngā Reo Irirangi Māori, the Iwi Radio Network, currently chaired by former Alliance MP Willie Jackson.

Programming on these stations includes national and local news coverage, music, educational programming, comedy, drama and programmes that teach the Māori language. These stations update listeners on iwi news and events, and promote Māori language and culture. Each station includes local shows, personalities and breakfast programmes.

Tahu FM, based in Christchurch, is also available on Sky digital 423.
