= Marae (TV series) =

New Zealand television series

- Presented by: Scotty Morrison; Miriama Kamo
- Country of origin: New Zealand

Original release
- Network: TVNZ 1
- Release: 1992 – present

Marae is a bilingual Māori and English language current affairs show on TVNZ 1, presented by Scotty Morrison and Miriama Kamo.

It is the longest Māori running current affairs programme on New Zealand television, starting in 1992. The items are in English and Māori language, this percentage changes over time. The focus of the programme is, "issues .... that affect the lives of Māori, or explaining kaupapa Māori from a Māori perspective."

== Staff ==
People who have worked on Marae over the years include producers Victor Allen (Assoc. Producer) and Derek Wooster (Producer 1992 – 2009).

Tainui Stephens was a director, producer, executive producer, presenter and reporter in the early days from 1992 until 1997.

Reporters have included Te Rangihau Gilbert, Greg Mayor, Carmen Parahi (2010–2014), Kayne Peters (2013–2015), Tahuri Tumoana, Mātai Smith (and presenter, 1996 – 1998). Directors have included Dean Hapeta, Rongotai Lomas, Greg Mayor, Tahuri Tumoana, Nevak Rogers (2002), Derek Wooster (Studio Director 1992 – 2008). Cushla Tangaere-Manuel was a reporter on Marae.

== See also ==
- Te Karere
- List of New Zealand television series
