= Scotty Morrison (broadcaster) =

Māori broadcaster, author and academic

Scott Jeffrey Morrison (born 19 November 1970), also known as Te Manahau Morrison, is a Māori language academic, writer and broadcaster in New Zealand. He is known for presenting two Māori current affairs programmes on television: Te Karere and Marae. He is author of award-winning Māori language guide Māori Made Easy.

== Biography ==
Morrison was born in Rotorua and grew up there. He affiliates to the Māori iwi of Ngāti Whakaue. His parents' names are Te Puhi o Te Arawa Mitchell and Tupara Morrison. His Māori name Te Manahau was gifted to him in the late 2000s while he was on his journey of learning to speak te reo Māori (Māori language).

Morrison is a graduate of the University of Waikato with a Diploma of Teaching, a Bachelor of Education and master's degree (Education). He states that Professor Wharehuia Milroy was influential on him when he was first studying.

Morrison is the presenter of the news in Māori language Te Karere and Marae, both on the state New Zealand television network TVNZ.

He has worked as the Director of Māori Student and Community Engagement at the Unitec Institute of Technology in Auckland, and as associate professor of Te Reo Māori at Te Pūtahi-a-Toi (School of Māori Knowledge) at Massey University. He is a member of the Ngā Pae o te Māramatanga, New Zealand's Māori Centre of Research Excellence hosted at the University of Auckland.

In 2019, he commented on the Māori language revitalisation that has occurred in New Zealand:

Over the last 30 years I’ve seen so much change in the way te reo Māori is valued, and always hold in the highest regard the reo champions who fought for our language to be recognised officially and protect its mana. They’re the reason why people like me have a kaupapa to write for.

== Books ==
- Morrison, S. (2021). The Raupo Phrasebook of Modern Maori: The user-friendly guide for all New Zealanders. Auckland, NZ: Penguin NZ.
- Morrison, S. (2020). Māori made easy: For everyday learners of the Māori language. Auckland, NZ: Penguin Random House New Zealand
- Morrison, S., & Morrison, S. (2020). MAORI MADE FUN: 200+ puzzles and games to boost your reo. Raupō Publishing (New Zealand)
- Morrison, S. (2019). Māori at work: The everyday guide to using te reo Māori in the workplace. Auckland, NZ: Penguin Random House New Zealand
- Morrison, S., & Morrison, S. (2018). Māori made easy 2: The next step in your language-learning journey. Raupō Publishing (New Zealand)
- Morrison, S., & Morrison, S. (2017). Māori at home: An everyday guide to learning the Māori language. Raupō Publishing (New Zealand)

== Awards ==
2016 - Nga Kupu Ora Maori Book Award – Te Reo Maori, for his book Maori Made Easy

2019 - Te Tohu Korurenga Hau Culture Change award - Te Taura Whiri i te Reo Maori The Maori Language Commission - for innovation & leadership as a teacher

2020 - BLAKE leader

== Personal life ==
Morrison is married to broadcaster Stacey Morrison. The couple have three children.
