= SuperGold Card =

Discounts and concessions card in New Zealand

The face of a SuperGold Card

The SuperGold Card (informally, the "Gold Card") is a concession card for senior citizens and veterans in New Zealand. The card includes public transport benefits like free off-peak travel (funded by the government) and discounts from businesses and companies across thousands of outlets.

== Functions and purpose ==
The card is available to all eligible New Zealanders over the age of 65. The card does not expire. A Veterans' SuperGold Card also exists for those who have served in the New Zealand Defence Force in a recognised war or emergency. The card provides over 600,000 New Zealanders with access to a wide range of government and local authority services, business discounts, entitlements and concessions, such as hearing aid subsidies. However, it was argued much of the extra costs were 'book entries'. For example, the Government subsidises much of public transport anyway, where buses and trains travel with empty seats during off-peak hours; SuperGold Card commuters are simply using buses and trains during off-peak times.

== History ==
It was a major initiative of the political party New Zealand First, which established a research team to design the SuperGold Card. The party leader Winston Peters negotiated the scheme with then-Prime Minister Helen Clark, despite widespread opposition to the card on the grounds of high cost. As a condition of the 2005 confidence and supply agreement between New Zealand First and the Labour Government, Peters launched the SuperGold Card in August 2007.

SuperGold Card came under threat in 2010 when National Minister Steven Joyce tried to terminate free SuperGold transport on some more expensive public transport services, including the Waiheke Island ferry and the Wairarapa Connection train. The Minister retreated when he came under fire from senior citizens.

In October 2019, Peters announced a $7.7 million investment into the SuperGold Card scheme. The "upgrade" includes a new website, a mobile app, and 500 new partner businesses.

In May 2026, Finance Minister Nicola Willis announced that the New Zealand Government would allocate $36 million from the 2026 New Zealand budget to upgrading the SuperGold Card into a form of photo identification.
