= Pio Terei =

New Zealand actor

Pio Terei MNZM
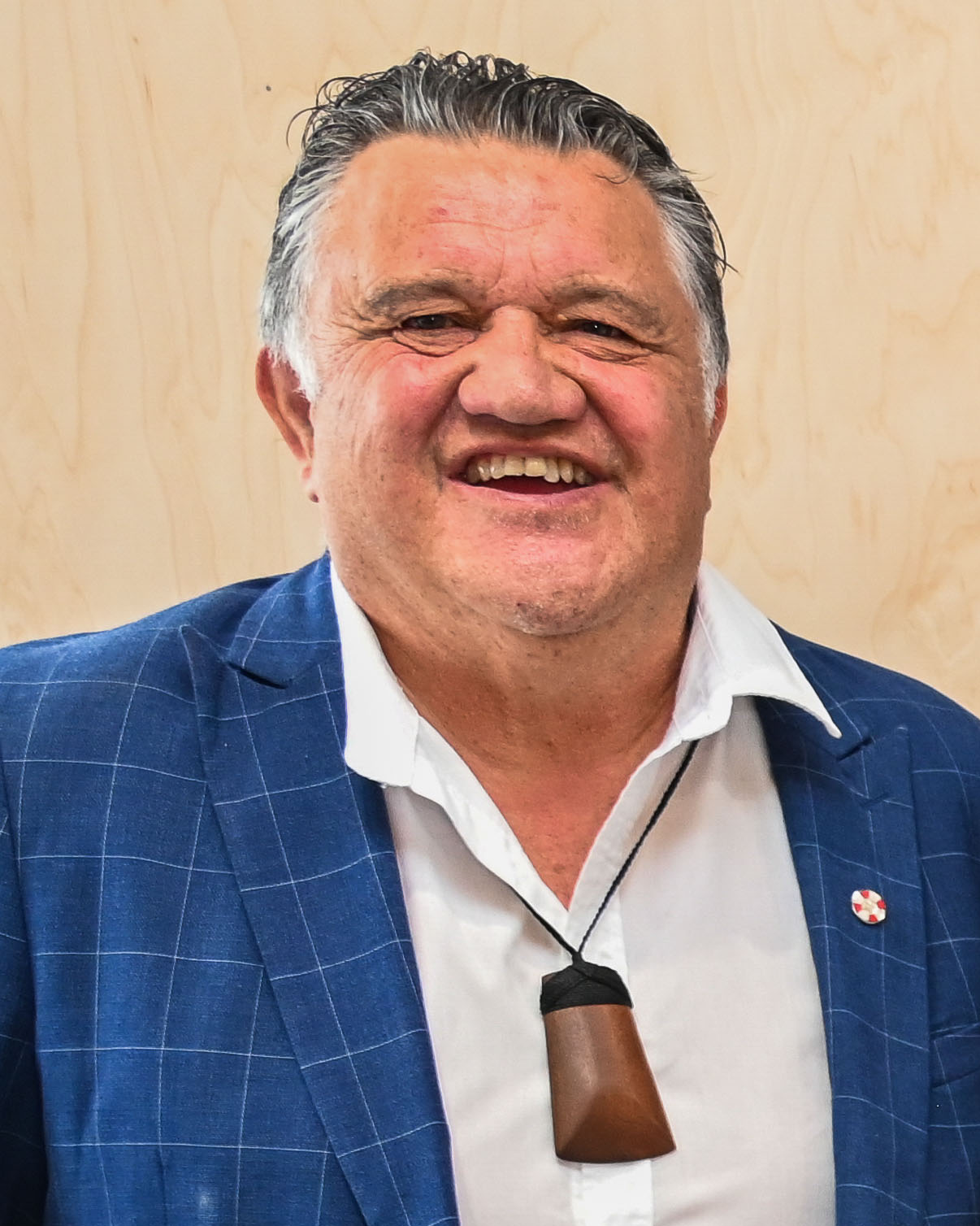
- Terei in 2025
- Born: Pio Keith Terei; 1958 (age 67–68); New Zealand
- Occupations: Actor, singer & comedian

Pio Keith Terei MNZM (born 1958) is a Māori actor, singer and comedian on New Zealand television.

== Early career ==
Early in his working life he sold light commercial trucks for 14 years. In 1995 Terei headlined his own TV3 show Pete and Pio with fellow comedian Peter Rowley. After the success of Pete and Pio, Terei led his own show called Pio!, featuring similar skits to his previous programme. It ran from 1997 to 1999 and it was during this period that he hosted the Coca Cola Christmas in the Park. When Pio! was cancelled in 1999, Terei moved to the TVNZ network.

In 2000, Terei led a TVNZ programme entitled The Life and Times of Te Tutu, a comedy following the daily life of an 1800s Māori chief. Under his own Pipi Productions company, The Life and Times of Te Tutu played weekly until cancelled in 2001, when Terei ceased work under Pipi Productions.

== Comeback ==
His comeback was with the TV ONE series Intrepid Journeys - a travel show where each week a New Zealand celebrity would travel to a different destination. Terei, who hosted Intrepid Journeys: India, was praised for his comical yet informative segment which followed him across India, in a 90-minute special.

After that appearance, Terei wrote pieces for his new production company 4 Winds Studios which were contributed to the New Zealand dramas Mataku and Spin Doctors. In 2003 he was granted his own show again, entitled Big Saturday Night In. It featured New Zealand musicians from current and past years performing special acts - sometimes accompanied by Terei.

Terei and his 4 Winds Studios company contribute work to the Māori Television channel. He hosts his own fishing show on the channel and is a spokesperson for the New Zealand Coastguard. He is on staff as Pou Tangata and presenter at Parenting Place., a national charity that supports parents and families in New Zealand. Since 2003 he has presented Building Awesome Whānau around the country and with Parenting Place, launched a new touring programme called "The Parenting Show with Pio" in 2011. He has helped write and present two, thirteen-part series of parenting programmes on Māori TV called "No Sweat Parenting / Manaaki Whānau" 2009 and 2010. He has also been the advertising face of the Freeview digital television platform since 2012.

As at 2021 Pio Terei is represented by the talent agency Auckland Actors.

== Honours and awards ==
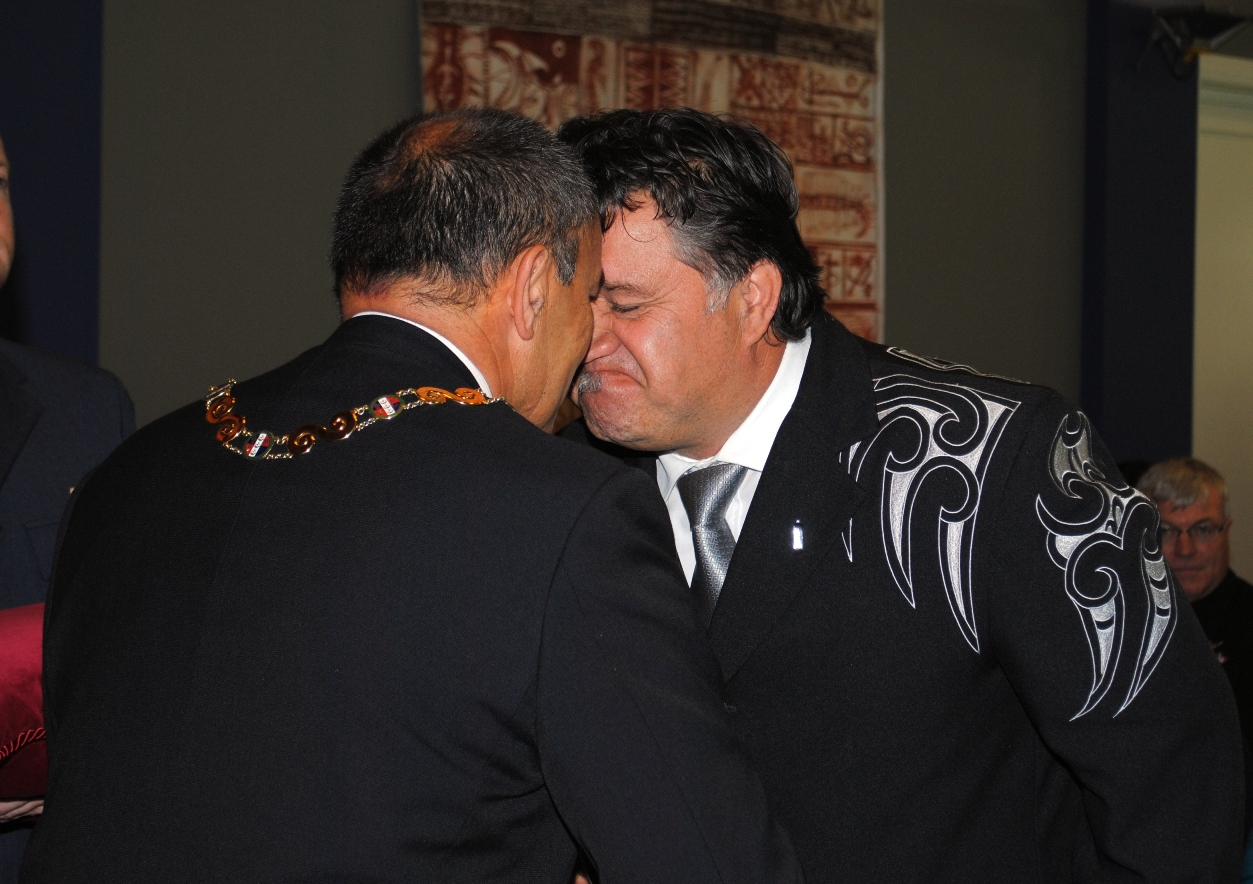
Terei (right) and Sir Jerry Mateparae hongi at Terei's investiture as a Member of the New Zealand Order of Merit at Government House, Auckland, on 20 April 2012

In 1997 he was presented the Rielly Comedy Award by the Variety Artists Club of New Zealand.

In the 2012 New Year Honours, Terei was appointed a Member of the New Zealand Order of Merit for services to entertainment.

== Personal life ==
Terei's first name, Pio, is Italian. He is Ngāpuhi and Te Rarawa. Terei resides with his wife and children in Auckland, New Zealand. The family currently stars in a New Zealand travel show entitled Are We There Yet? on TV ONE.

In his spare time, Terei is a known fishing enthusiast and musician. He frequently hosts corporate functions around New Zealand and is extremely popular as emcee. In interviews he has mentioned having a significant interest in New Zealand parenting values. He also has an interest in vintage cars and currently owns a 1956 Chevrolet Bel Air. As at 2010 he was a member (representing parents) on the Board of Trustees of St Peter's College, Auckland.

== Filmography ==
Film	Role	Year	Note
Te Aroroa: Tales from the trails	as himself	2015-16	Maori TV
It's in the Bag	As himself, host	2009-2013	TV game show
The Man Who Lost His Head	Hemi	2007	TV
No. 2	Uncle Percy	2006	
Frontier Tales	Narrator	2003	TV
Mataku	Tama	2002	Divine Intervention (TV) 1 episode
The Life & Times of Te Tutu	Te Tutu	1999	TV
Young Hercules	Corleonus	1998	Sisters (TV) 1 episode
Pio!	as himself	1997	TV series
Pio's Place	as himself	1996	TV series
Hercules in the Maze of the Minotaur	Innkeeper	1994	TV
Hercules in the Underworld	Sestus	1994	TV
