= Te Kāea =

- Starring: Piripi Taylor (anchor)
- Country of origin: New Zealand

Production
- Running time: 30 minutes

Original release
- Network: Whakaata Māori
- Release: 28 March 2004 – February 2019

Te Kāea ("The Call" or "The Leader", or Te Kaea News as written on television guides) is a nightly New Zealand television news show that aired on Whakaata Māori (Māori Television) at 6:30pm. It was repeated at 10:30pm, and had English subtitles. Te Kāea was also shown in Australia starting 17 March 2013, helped by Whakaata Māori's "strong collaborative relationship" with Australia's NITV as members of the World Indigenous Television Broadcasters Network (WITBN) and Australia's Māori population of 140,000 at the time.

== History ==
Te Kāea was anchored by Piripi Taylor.

It was created as an alternative to existing news programmes on national television, delivering news in a uniquely Māori perspective, in opposition to Te Karere, which was more mainstream. None of its reporters (a team of eight) at launch worked in mainstream media before, but have had a significant experience in Māori and had good Māori language skills. The weather segment, as well as including temperatures, also included times for fishing and gardening. The launch edition on 28 March 2004, was aired exceptionally at 8pm, for one hour.

On 1 November 2004, it moved to 7:30pm as part of a schedule realignment driven by viewer feedback, also gaining a subtitled repeat at 11pm. The long term goal was to have the live bulletin subtitled.

Māori Television announced the end of Te Kāea in November 2018, scheduled for February 2019, as part of a strategic plan to create a uniform brand for all of its news and current affairs programmes. Its current brand is Te Ao Māori News.
