= Te Reo (TV channel) =

New Zealand Māori language TV station

- Country: New Zealand

Programming
- Language: Māori
- Picture format: 576i 16:9

Ownership
- Owner: New Zealand Government; Te Putahi Paoho
- Sister channels: Whakaata Māori

History
- Launched: 28 March 2008; 18 years ago
- Closed: 28 March 2025; 13 months ago (over-the-air service)

Links
- Website: https://www.maoritelevision.com/

Te Reo (English: the language) is a New Zealand online service and former TV station broadcasting programmes exclusively in the Māori language (te reo Māori) with no advertising or subtitles. It also broadcasts special tribal programming and offers particular focus on new programming for the fluent audience. It was first considered in 2007, ahead of the launch of Freeview, using the tentative name Māori Television Rua or TV Rua.

The channel initially broadcast for three hours a day, seven days a week, during the prime time hours of 8:00 pm to 11:00 pm from Friday 28 March 2008 on Freeview Satellite. It was later added for Sky/Vodafone subscribers.

As of February 2023, the channel broadcasts, on average, from 11:30 am to 11:00 pm on weekdays and 4:30 pm to 11:00 pm on weekends. On 17 August 2017, the channel started broadcasting in high definition.

The Te Reo channel swapped Freeview positions with Prime, on 1 March 2023, with Te Reo moving to channel 10, Prime's former position, and Prime moving to channel 15, Te Reo's former position.

The channel closed its operations on over-the-air TV on 28 March 2025, as part of a 'digital first' strategy imposed by the broadcaster. The move is also to achieve cost savings in order to stay afloat, with its content moved to its online platforms. The channel left Freeview UHF and Satellite, becoming an internet-only channel after this date, on both the MĀORI+ OTT service and Freeview's Streaming TV app.

== See also ==
- Whakaata Māori
- World Indigenous Television Broadcasters Network
