= Te Ao Māori News =

- Te Ao Māori News logo
- Country of origin: New Zealand

Production
- Running time: 30 minutes

Original release
- Network: Whakaata Māori
- Release: 28 February 2019 – 13 December 2024

Te Ao Māori News ("Te Ao" means "The World") is the name given to the news operation of Whakaata Māori since February 2019, replacing Te Kāea.

== History ==
It was announced in November 2018 as part of a plan set up by Māori Television's news division, with the aim of cementing its status as a 'digital first' media organisation by creating a uniform brand, following the example of other news agencies. This implied the axing of Te Kāea for the main evening news bulletin in favour of Te Ao in February 2019.

In September 2024, Whakaata Māori announced, during a round of job cuts, the possibility of axing the linear Te Ao bulletin, in order to cut NZ$10 million by 2027, while moving the brand exclusively online and increasing engagement with its users. On 5 December 2024, the broadcaster confirmed the axing of 27 jobs and the cessation of Te Ao on linear TV effective 13 December.
