= Whakaata Māori =

New Zealand television channel

- Country: New Zealand
- Headquarters: Auckland, New Zealand

Programming
- Language: Māori
- Picture format: 1080i (HDTV); 576i (SDTV)

Ownership
- Owner: New Zealand Government; Te Putahi Paoho
- Sister channels: Te Reo; Te Ao Māori News

History
- Launched: 28 March 2004; 22 years ago
- Former names: Māori Television (2004–2022)

Links
- Website: www.whakaatamaori.co.nz

Availability

Terrestrial
- Freeview: 5
- Sky Television: 19

Whakaata Māori (Note: De facto Māori name when the English name was official until 2022, de jure name since then.) is a New Zealand television channel that broadcasts programmes that make a significant contribution to the revitalisation of the Māori language and culture. Created in the early 2000s after a series of petitions from the Māori population, especially after the closure of the Aotearoa Television Network in 1997; and funded by the New Zealand Government, it commenced broadcasting as Māori Television on 28 March 2004 from its studios in Newmarket, Auckland. It has since moved to East Tamaki, Auckland. In 2021, the channel launched a news service called Te Ao Māori News and a streaming app called MĀORI+. It officially changed its name to Whakaata Māori in June 2022.

== Name ==
The name Whakaata Māori has been official since 2022, but has been used as a de facto Māori name for the channel since its inception. Until June 2022, Māori Television was the official name of the channel.

The word "Whakaata" means "to mirror", "to reflect" and "to display". "Whakaata" is also used as part of the compound "pouaka whakaata", which literally means "display box", in turn, "television".

== Mission ==
The channel aims to revitalise Māori language and culture through its programming. The relevant legislation says "The principal function of the Service is to promote te reo Māori me nga tikanga Māori (Māori language and culture) through the provision of a high quality, cost-effective Māori television service, in both Māori and English, that informs, educates, and entertains a broad viewing audience, and, in doing so, enriches New Zealand's society, culture, and heritage".

== History ==
=== Early developments and prelaunch ===
In the early days of television in New Zealand, Māori-language programming was scarce. Suggestions were made as far back as 1976 by the New Zealand Māori Council to create a Māori and Polynesian current affairs programme, followed by a second petition in 1978 to create a Māori production unit within the BCNZ, with the aim of adding "a Māori dimension to regular viewing". There was significant process in the decade, such as the 1974 documentary series Tangata Whenua. In 1980, the newly created Television New Zealand started a Māori production unit, its first production being the current affairs magazine Koha, followed in Māori Language Week 1982 by a four-minute bulletin which eventually became Te Karere the following year.

While TVNZ's Koha and Te Karere were showing signs of progress, there was heavy hostility at the time. Pākehā staff at TVNZ believed that Māori programmes "were of high nuisance value and minimal importance", as well as fears of a takeover by Māoris.

In the mid-1980s, there were projects for a dedicated Māori television channel. When the Māori Council, in 1985, after the 1984 neoliberal reforms that facilitated the creation of a third national network, made a pitch for a service named Aotearoa Broadcasting Systems, both the government and the BCNZ rejected ABS's proposal, losing the opportunity for a national Māori television service.

By the early 90s, iwi radio stations emerged as well as a dedicated funding agency, Te Reo Whakapuaki Irirangi, which in 1993 was renamed Te Māngai Pāho and spun-off from New Zealand On Air in 1995. In 1996, a joint Māori-Crown Working Group on Broadcasting Policy was set up, and in the same year, the Aotearoa Television Network launched as a pilot service in the Auckland area for thirteen weeks. ATN was plagued by lack of planning and government funding, which ultimately led to its closure, as well as hostile media coverage. In the aftermath of its closure, a workshop was made by the Language Commission in Hamilton with the aim of dubbing cartoons into the Māori language, led by Waihoroi Shortland, one of its members.

The government decided to support a dedicated service in December 1997. Ministers estimated that the policy would cost NZ$12 million in 1997-98 and $17 million from 1998-99. The plan was halted in February 1998, which was criticised by politicians. On 19 May 1998, the government through its Māori Affairs minister Tau Henare announced the setup of a Māori television channel for NZ$11 million. It would air programming funded by Te Māngai Pāho, which, according to legislation, could not pay for setting up radio and TV stations. The Wellington Māori Language Board criticised the use of these funds as it estimated that it would take NZ$100 million to make it competitive with mainstream channels in English. Piripi Walker said that with NZ$11 million alone, the channel could be strapped for cash during week two of operations. During Budget meetings days later, it was speculated that the NZ$11 million payment was solely for the purpose of setting up a transmitter network, buying equipment and establishing an operating location. Tuku Morgan, who was involved with ATN, said that there was already a certainty of funding, and that it should use MTV's network from TVNZ, which it had formerly used for Horizon Pacific until its closure in 1997. Other suggestions included a link with Sky, buying a production house, or giving the money to TVNZ's Māori department to produce its programmes. Advertising sales were seen as difficult given the budget given to fund it on the grounds of being a niche channel; as of June 1998, it was expected to launch between March and June 1999.

Bill Falconer was named trustee of the channel on 19 June 1998, alongside Treaty of Waitangi fisheries commissioner and TVNZ board director Whaimutu Dewes, businesswoman and publisher Robyn Bargh, Māori programme maker and broadcaster Waihoroi Shortland and lawyer, programme maker and broadcaster Ian Taylor, who together would make use of the budget given in May.

The Māori Broadcasting Advisory Committee was set up in 2000 by Derek Fox with the aim of creating a television network where the Māori language would become commonplace in prime time slots. The Fifth Labour Government particularly the Minister of Māori Affairs Parekura Horomia had supported the idea of a fully-fledged Māori television station following the 1999 New Zealand general election. An establishment trust called Te Awhioraki Trust led by Fox was also set up. In the period ahead of its launch, controversies emerged, such as the sacking of Canadian CEO John Davy, the first CEO of the channel, fired after six weeks due to false qualifications, as well as concerns that the new service was a "waste of taxpayers' money" and was destined to be a failure. A new report in October said that the initial NZ$11.1 million used to set up the channel were now joined by an additional NZ$19.1 million for annual funding, as well as additional plans to make the channel financially self-sustainable. At a hui in Auckland later that month, a report was rejected under the grounds that it was "Crown controlled and driven". The government on 16 December announced that the channel would cost NZ$96 million for its first five years on air, NZ$16.87 million a year.

Search for a new body of six trusteed began in January, initially scheduled to be complete by the end of the month; these were appointed on 13 March: the new trustee was held by Beverly Adlam, a businesswoman from Wellington, joined by Wellington Māori-language publisher Robyn Bargh, Auckland Treaty lawyer Joe Williams, Auckland artist Selwyn Muru, management consultant Hemi Toia, and Dunedin television producer Ian Taylor. Adlam refused to make any comparisons with ATN. In November, Tuku Morgan was likely expected to land a "top job" at the new channel.

On 26 November 1999, the channel received government approval at a new cost of NZ$10.9 million. The first NZ$6.5 million in capital were available to the trustees next week; while the remainder was reserved to when the chief executive and staff were appointed. A network of UHF frequencies was also reserved. The government then delayed the decision in mid-December to 2000; this angered trustees, which Adlam said were because of "delays and lack of communication". In January 2000, the government was suggesting delaying the launch plan for the channel, pending a complete review.

On 2 August 2000, Te Māngai Pāho released its annual report, raising concerns on NZ$13.8 million spent for already produced programmes that could stay shelved until Māori Television could open. This left the agency in a catch-22 situation until the government solved the issue. On 7 November, Parekura Horomia announced the possibility of launching the channel in early 2001. Some time before, Marae on TV One held a survey in which most respondents wanted the channel to be bilingual. The government then put it on another delay in December. A new TMP announcement in February 2001 said that it would now take NZ$40 million to set it up. Board member Joanna Paul justified that the delay, despite frustration from Māoridom, also took technological advantages as the channel would well be taking the lead in digital technologies. In March 2001, the Clark government announced plans to try to kickstart its operations. That month, Horomia met with Sky's network manager to carry the proposed channel on its digital satellite service, and would provide dual audio programming. The channel started to take shape in May 2001, with NZ$19.2 million in Te Māngai Pāho funding and NZ$6 million a year in operational funding. Māori-language programming would take up 90 minutes of programming per evening. Further delays and financial uncertainties led to more anger among trustees. A new TMP proposal in June suggested that the channel should be bilingual to cater to a small portion of Pākehā viewers and there was the possibility of carrying commercial advertising. Government approval was sealed on 24 July; the channel was due to be on air by July 2002 and would now cost NZ$55 million a year. It was expected that the channel would be seen in most of Wellington using a UHF frequency. This also meant the dissolution of the existing trust, Te Awhiorangi Te Reo, and the creation of the Māori Television Service.

New interim directors were appointed in September. These included Wellington businesswoman Hekia Parata, former TVNZ board member Whaimutu Dewes, journalist and broadcaster Joanna Paul, and Craig Soper, who had recently been retired from the post of managing director at Compudigm International. Conflicts of interest were set to emerge between Derek Fox's commitments at the channel and at the Māori Party. Hekia Parata resigned after only the operational part of the budget was allocated. She was replaced by Martin Cleave in January 2002. That month, Tuku Morgan was given NZ$1,6 million to make ten programmes for the channel.

In February 2002, TV3 wanted to close the floundering TV4 and would lease its mostly VHF transmitter network to Māori Television. Still that month, Joanna Paul left over possible conflicts of interest and tried to find ways with the Government to boost funding. Rumours emerged in March that a Canadian was set to become the head of the channel. This was revealed to be John Davy on 12 March; the appointment was controversial has he had no experience with the Māori language and culture, and while he had experience with radio, he had little to no involvement with television. He promised to learn the language and met the MTS board on 15 March. Families of children attending Māori language schools considered a boycott under the grounds that Māori Television would broadcast in English and that it would give the "wrong image of language revitalisation". In April, TV3 announced the likeliness of the sale of TV4, though TV3 suggested that it would not shut down completely, and that its off-air time should be given over to Māori Television. If the deal went through, according to John Davy, TV4 would hand over the network instead full time. MTS opted for a VHF network, considering that UHF signals had significant coverage gaps. The government ordered an operation on John Davy's CV, which was suspected to be false; on 26 April, MTS rejected the allegations. Davy left the channel on 29 April.

As early as 2002, independent production companies were beginning mass production of programmes for the new service, which were funded by Te Māngai Pāho. The channel would broadcast on average for eight hours a day, and by year-end 2004, would have acquired 2,020 hours of programmes, of which 1,122 were homemade. 60 to 70 percent of the output was going to be in Māori. Language issues were still being discussed by language scholars, as some rejected the idea of it being bilingual. Arni Wainui contested the 50/50 English/Māori split in late April. Wayne Walden became the interim head in late May, following Davy's resignation. In September, Tawini Ranguhau, formerly of ATN, joined the board. Meanwhile, it was still facing a frequency dilemma, which caused a delay in its launch. The board still favoured the VHF network, claiming that it would be accessible to Māori in rural areas. Search for a new CEO began in November to fill in the post left vacant by Davy; at the time, the MTS staff had "good progress" with the channel's development and was still hoping to buy the TV4 network in a last-ditch effort. A hearing took place on 18 November, the result of which was inconclusive. The deal was expected to cost between NZ$6.2 million and NZ$7.2 million; Canwest would also sell two of its Auckland radio stations. TMP chief executive Trevor Moeke suggested that, if the MTS plan was halted, it would continue its arrangements with existing channels.

A funding boost from TMP worth NZ$2,35 million was passed on 13 January 2003 to produce thirteen programmes for the channel. These included cooking shows, a comedy/karaoke-style talent show, a documentary about prophet Tahupotiki Wiremu Ratana and a sports show. TMP chief executive Trevor Moeke said that no date was set, but some people working for the channel were still aiming for a June target. Helen Clark, on her behalf, suggested a budget for the service. Cabinet finalised plans for Māori Television's transmission platform on 28 January, with an announcement held the following day. With an increase worth NZ$7 million, it decided to launch on a UHF network instead, leaving the TV4 plans behind (TV4 would eventually become C4 in April). Viewers with VHF-only antennas had to convert or buy a Sky satellite subscription. There was still concern over high costs for installing UHF aerials. One of the areas left out at launch (initially during 2003) was Taranaki; the network sought to cover areas with a high Māori population at launch time, greater than any other national television network at the same occasion, according to Horomia. The second phase would include areas such as Taranaki and Hawke's Bay; at which time the channel was expected to be operational. Auditions for Hori-Oke began on 7 February.

On 12 February, Derek Fox was appointed CEO, while Wayne Walden took over his Fox's role as chairman in late March. The Māori Television Service Act 2003 (Te Aratuku Whakaata Irirangi Māori) was passed in May 2003, establishing MTS as a statutory corporation. From then until August, it began recruiting its team of 140 professionals; which was criticised by the Treasury as "Te Blowout" owing to its expensive cost, including an NZ$600,000 building in Newmarket. Fox resigned on 23 August. On 19 September, it announced its plans to broadcast free-to-air using Sky's infrastructure, in opposition to the BCL network. By January 2004, the network claimed to be "on target" for its launch, yet details for its transmission network were not finalised.

=== Launch and Newmarket era ===
Māori Television logo used from 2004–2022.

On 6 February, it announced a 28 March launch date. The network would cover an estimated 82% percent of the national population, including 78% of the Māori population. Test broadcasts started on 1 March 2004 on UHF frequencies previously used by Sky to relay CNN International. The decision was taken in January as CNN was not a priority for the UHF service of 100,000 subscribers, of which only 1.5% of subscribers regularly watched the channel. In addition, the channel was to be carried on channel 33 of its digital satellite service. At the time, construction and refit of its Newmarket facilities were nearing completion.

Māori Television was launched on 28 March 2004 with a special dawn ceremony attended by 2000 people at the Newmarket headquarters of the channel. The newly launched channel attracted 300,000 viewers in its second month of operation. In April, Parliament claimed that nobody watched the channel, however it had a contract with AC Nielsen that would not cover its first three months on air. Once the Nielsen data for the first twelve weeks was announced, it was revealed that more Pākehā were watching the channel than Māori, as out of 358,000 viewers who tuned in during the period, only 35% were Māori.

On Christmas Day 2004, the channel aired Te Harinui - A Māori Television Christmas, a special looking back at its achievements in its first ten months on air, followed by the Māori dub of Jesus. On 28 March 2005, its first anniversary was observed with a special movie line-up (including dubs of Flight of the Albatross and Stickmen), live links from the Mana Day Out concert at Aotea Square and an open day at its Newmarket premises.

The channel alone attracted 1.5 million viewers each month as of 2009, including half of all Māori aged five or more, and one-third of all New Zealanders. Te Reo, a second channel from Māori Television, was launched on 28 March 2008. In contrast with the main channel, it is ad-free and completely in the Māori language (without subtitles). Te Reo features special tribal programming with a particular focus on new programming for the fluent members of its audience.

In March 2013, Māori TV switched over from analogue television to digital television as part of a nationwide transition to digital television broadcasting between September 2012 and November 2013. On 17 August 2017, the channel started broadcasting in high definition.

=== Relocation ===
In 2021, Māori TV launched a news service called Te Ao Māori News and a streaming app called MĀORI+ to extend their audience and make their content more accessible to viewers.

=== Rename to Whakaata Māori and 2024 restructuring ===
Very short lived Māori Television logo used from April to June 2022.

On 23 May 2022, the channel announced that it was going to change its official name to Whakaata Māori, the name being used in the Māori since the channel's inception, but until then not at an official scale. The new name took effect on June 9 with a special dawn ceremony.

Whakaata Māori celebrated its 20th anniversary on 28 March 2024. During its 20th anniversary celebration, Whakaata Māori kaihautū (leader) Shane Taurima reiterated the station's commitment to providing an "unabashed" Māori voice in the New Zealand media landscape. While acknowledging budgetary difficulties facing the channel, Taurima stated that the Whakaata Māori had built a "dedicated audience" and was shifting to become a "digital-first" audience in order to engage with social media users.

In March 2024, Whakaata Māori (formerly Māori Television) became the latest media group to sign a commercial deal with Google. The deal meant the channel would receive money to curate Te Ao Māori stories to be published on Google's News Showcase platform.

In late September 2024, Whakaata Māori proposed a major internal restructure including axing its daily news television bulletin due to a projected NZ$10 million funding reduction by 2027. Kaihautū Shane Taurima also announced plans to shift Te Ao Māori News from a linear television to a digital format.

On 5 December 2024, Whakaata Māori confirmed plans to cut 27 roles, move its Te Reo channel from terrestrial TV to online, and end its 20-year news programme from 13 December to focus on its digital news website Te Ao Māori News. These cutbacks and restructuring were in response to financial shortfalls in recent years.

== Identity ==
The channel's logo consists of the channel's name in uppercase lettering, of which the O in Māori is a koru, itself a widely used Māori cultural symbol. Orange is the channel's corporate colour, as it is not present on the flag of New Zealand and the national Māori flag. The logo and launch identity were designed by 4i Communications with only six weeks left before the channel launched.

For a long time, its motto was Mā rātou, mā mātou, mā koutou, mā tātou (For them, for us, for you, for everyone), implying that the channel was for all New Zealanders and not just Māori. It was adopted when the channel began broadcasting in 2004.

== Operations ==
The channel operates under the stewardship of the New Zealand government, and the Māori Television Electoral College (Te Putahi Paoho). As of 2021 it had a budget of NZ$19.24 million.

In July 2015, Māori Television's seven-member board of directors decided that Hamilton or Rotorua could be a new home for the broadcaster.

Since 2021, the channel has a news app called Te Ao Māori News and a video streaming platform called MĀORI+. By late March 2024, Shane Taurima said that the MĀORI+ app had 144,000 viewers daily.

=== Ratings ===
A survey in 2009 by Business and Economic Research Limited found that 84% of the general New Zealand population think Māori Television should be a permanent part of New Zealand broadcasting.

Whakaata Māori continues to attract an increasingly broad audience across ages, genders and ethnicities. More than two-thirds of its audience are non-Māori. They are drawn by the channel's local programming, such as Kai Time on the Road, Kete Aronui and Ask Your Auntie; New Zealand movies and documentaries; and the diverse range of international features not seen on other NZ networks.

== Programming ==
Logo for the Māori+ on-demand service.

=== Comedy ===
- Aroha Bridge
- The Ring Inz
- Radio Kuka

=== Language learning ===
- Ako
- Tōku Reo
- Kōrero Mai – TVNZ's first Māori-language series, presented by Pou Temara
- Ōpaki

=== Music ===
- Tuhono (2004, produced by Ngai Tahu Communications at Whitebait TV's studios)

=== News and current affairs ===
- Ask your Auntie (2004–2007) – Hosted by Professor Ella Henry.
- Te Kāea(2004–2019) – replaced by Te Ao Māori News
- Kawe Kōrero – Reporters
- Paepae
- Media Take
- Te Ao Tapatahi
- Te Ao Mārama
- Te Ao Māori News (2019–2024) – ended due to budget contraints
- Te Ao with Moana

=== Culture ===
- Waka Huia – repeats of the TVNZ culture documentary series)

=== Lifestyle ===
- Get Your Fish On
- Moko Aotearoa
- Whānau Living
- Kai Time on the Road
- Piri's Tiki Tour

=== Entertainment ===
- The GC
- Haka Life
- Game Of Bros
- Playlist
- Tribe
- Whiua Te Pātai

=== Children ===
- Pūkana
- Pūrākau
- Mīharo
- Mahi Pai
- Mahi Whai
- Toiriki
- Kia Mau!
- He Rourou
- Zoomoo
- Cube
- Te NūTube
- Pōtae Pai
- Tākaro Tribe
- Darwin & Newts
- Taki Atu Taki Mai
- Tamaiti Tu
- Paia
- Te Pamu Kumara
- Wiki Ha
- Kainga Whakapaipai
- kikoriki (dubbed in Māori)
- Haati Paati
- Pipi Pao Pao
- E Kori
- Mauri Reo Mauri Ora
- Huro Pepi
- Tamariki Haka
- Teina 2 Tuakana
- Poniponi
- Akina
- Whare Takataka
- Island of Mystery (dubbed in Māori)
- CocoMelon (dubbed in Māori)
- Morphle (dubbed in Māori)
- Kiri & Lou (dubbed in Māori)
- Avatar The Last Airbender (dubbed in Māori)

==== Past programming ====
- The Backyardigans (dubbed in Māori) (2008–2010)
- This Week in WWE (2018)
- WWE Experience (2018)
- WWE Raw (2018)
- WWE SmackDown (2018)
- Pūkoro
- Pipi Mā
- Waiata Mai
- SpongeBob SquarePants (dubbed in Māori as SpongeBob Tarau Porowhā)
- Team Umizoomi (dubbed in Māori)
- Space Goofs (dubbed in Māori as Rorirori Ātea) (2005)
- Jane and the Dragon (dubbed in Māori)
- Maraerobics
- Rolie Polie Olie (dubbed in Māori)
- Coast
- Tuhono
- Maggie and the Ferocious Beast (dubbed in Māori)
- The Penguins of Madagascar (dubbed in Māori as Penguins of Madagascar)
- The Adventures of Spot (dubbed in Māori)
- Pippi Longstocking (dubbed in Māori)
- Wow! Wow! Wubbzy! (dubbed in Māori as Aue! Aue! Wubbzy)
- Miss Spider's Sunny Patch Friends (dubbed in Māori version)
- Play School (Te Reo Māori Version)
- The Future Is Wild (dubbed in Māori)
- Ihumanea
- He Matapihi
- Redwall (dubbed in Māori)
- Winners & Losers
- Kai Time on the Road
- Journey to the West: Legends of the Monkey King (dubbed in Māori as Kiingi Maki)
- Umanga
- The Rez
- Ako
- All Talk With Anika Moa
- American Experience
- Ask Your Auntie
- Asia Down Under
- Anika Moa Unleashed
- Animated Tales of the World (dubbed in Māori)
- Ariki
- Aroha Bridge
- Bakugan Battle Brawlers (dubbed in Māori)
- Barney The Dog (dubbed in Māori as Barney Te Kuri)

"Behind The Bush

- Beyond Matariki
- Blaktrax
- Blood Brothers
- Bobtales (dubbed in Māori)
- Bubble Guppies (dubbed in Māori as Ngā Pāpara Kapi)
- Bush Mechanics
- Buzz and Poppy (dubbed in Māori)
- Catalyst
- Class of the Titans (dubbed in Māori)
- Coast
- Cubeez (dubbed in Māori)
- Cyberchase (dubbed in Māori)
- Cyberworld
- Defensor 5 (dubbed in Māori)
- Di-Gata Defenders (dubbed in Māori)
- Dragon Flyz (dubbed in Māori as Ngā Kaaakapowai)
- Dora the Explorer (dubbed in Māori as Dora Mātātoa)
- E Ko

== Controversies ==
Canadian John Davy was appointed chief executive of Māori Television in 2002. However, it was found that his qualifications were false — he claimed to hold a degree from "Denver State University" which did not exist — and he was fired. A few weeks after the channel's launch, a supposed Tui billboard circulated online saying "I've been watching Māori TV – yeah right". DB Breweries said that the billboard was made with a computer (the original unadulterated billboard was found in Tauranga) and did not generate it. The supposed joke meant that Māori Television had no ratings, whereas channel communications manager Sonia Haggie claimed that 70% of Māori were tuning in.

In 2005, newsreader Julian Wilcox was fired (and reinstated) after he contributed to information provided to other media that led to negative coverage of the channel. That same year, Te Kāea presenter Ngarimu Daniels was banned from taking part in protests, and her partner was referred to as a "dyke" by a senior channel manager. She was awarded $16,000 compensation, and her partner, Leonie Pihama, a leading Māori academic and film-maker, resigned from the channel's board, citing a conflict of interest.

In 2015, the channel's star broadcaster, Mihingarangi Forbes, resigned after complaints arose that senior management (including CEO Paora Maxwell) were attempting to shut down a story critical of the Kohanga Reo National Trust Board to be broadcast on her show Native Affairs. An external consultant recommended to the channel's board that reporting "not challenge and critique one another", leading some (including commentator Morgan Godfery) to question whether journalists at Māori Television had the necessary freedom to report on the failures of elders in Māoridom. Native Affairs and other current affairs programming was later cut back or cancelled altogether, a decision criticised by Green MP Marama Davidson.

In 2019, the channel offered candidates for the 2019 Auckland mayoral election the opportunity to pay $500 to be interviewed and to have that interview broadcast on its TV and digital platforms, an offer one candidate described as close to "extortion".
