= Te Karere =

New Zealand's first Māori language television programme

- Also known as: TK, The Messenger, TM
- Māori: Te Karere o Nui Tireni
- Genre: News
- Created by: Derek Fox, Whai Ngata
- Starring: Scotty Morrison Rapaera Tawhai (Reporter, Presenter) Marena Mane (Reporter, Presenter) Stephanie Fong (Presenter) Harata Brown (Reporter, Te Tai Tokerau) Raniera Harrison (Reporter, Producer) Te Okiwa McLean (Reporter) Kereama Wright (Reporter) Ethan Oneroa (Reporter, Digital Producer) Kataraina Anneff (Digital Production) Tiare Rakuraku (Production)
- Country of origin: New Zealand
- Original language: Māori
- No. of seasons: 41

Production
- Executive producer: Blake Ihimaera
- Running time: 30 minutes
- Production company: 1News

Original release
- Network: TVNZ 1
- Release: 21 February 1982 – present

Related
- Breakfast (New Zealand TV programme)

Te Karere (The Messenger) is a news and current affairs show that was New Zealand's first Māori language television programme. Te Karere is broadcast on Television New Zealand's TVNZ 1 at 4:00 pm on weekdays and repeated 1:05 am and 5:35 am the following day. The focus of the programme is content which is of national significance to the targeted Māori audience.

The programme is funded in its entirety by Te Māngai Pāho.

== History ==
Te Karere first went to air during Māori Language Week, with a two minute bulletin celebrating the week in 1982. The original presenters and producers were Derek Fox and Whai Ngata.

The following year, Te Karere got a regular slot of four minutes. With a modest, shoestring budget, Fox and Ngata produced a professional news show. The show was originally broadcast on TV2, but as that channel had poor coverage on the East Coast, with its large Māori population, Te Karere was moved to TV One.

There was some criticism in the early days of the show, when Fox recalled, at the time of its 25th anniversary, that a group of kids from Tokomaru Bay were dissatisfied at it because it cut the end of Doctor Who episodes.

The show later expanded to 15 minutes.

Due to the introduction of a new 4:30pm One News bulletin, TV One moved Te Karere to a 3:45pm timeslot in September 2007, further away from prime time. Whai Ngata claimed that the airtime matched Māori viewing habits, but received criticism from Māori Party leader Pita Sharples.

On 1 February 2009, to mark its 25th anniversary, Te Karere expanded to 30 minutes and began airing live for the first time, airing at 4pm. In 2009 alone, the show attracted 10% of the available audience, corresponding to approximately 90,000 viewers. Its competitor Te Kāea, which aired in a prime time slot, only attracted 0.3%, which made it impossible to gather accurate numbers. Shane Taurima was behind all of the changes in 2009, in order to make the show more accessible to viewers. Live subtitles were added on 31 July 2011, after requests from non-Māori viewers.

On 24 October 2025, the state Māori media funding agency Te Māngai Pāho reduced Te Karere's funding allocation for its 2026 season from NZ$2.7 million to NZ$1 million, amounting to a 64% budget cut.

== Identity ==
Since its conversion to a half-hour programme in 2009, the bulletin incorporates a whakaaraara chant at the beginning (Kia hiwa rā). In editions presented by Scotty Morrison, his sign-off phrase is "Turou Hawaiki", which is comparable to "may the force be with you". Scotty's cousin Temuera Morrison starred in the Star Wars prequel trilogy; derived from the concept of metaphysical energy also present in Polynesian mythology, he selected the phrase to resonate with young Māori viewers. The idea came from a paper Scotty found in a Te Arawa elder which said "Turou parea, turou Hawaiki".

The colour palette for Te Karere differs from the other 1 News bulletins, emphasising more on brown and red, which are typically found on the exteriors of Wharenui meeting houses. The theme music, composed by Jim Hall, is derived from 1 News, adapted for Māori cultural codes, with heavy emphasis on vocals, important in Māori culture, and the utterance "hī", understood as a call to action.

== Reporters ==
The award-winning Māori broadcaster Tini Molyneux began her broadcasting career on Te Karere in the 1980s.

- Harata Brown (Reporter, Te Tai Tokerau)
- Raniera Harrison (Producer, Reporter)
- Kereama Wright (Reporter)
- Marena Mane (Presenter, Reporter)
- Ethan Oneroa (Digital Producer, Reporter)
- Ellyce McLeod (Producer, Reporter)
- Te Okiwa McLean (Reporter)
- Scotty Morrison (News Anchor, 2003–)
- Rapaera Tawhai (Reporter, Presenter)

== Producers ==
- Blake Ihimaera (Executive Producer)
- Rapaera Tawhai (Executive Producer)
- Roihana Nuri (Executive Producer)
- Arana Taumata (Executive Producer)
- Shane Taurima (Executive Producer)
- Moari Stafford (Executive Producer)
- Derek Fox (Executive Producer)
- Whai Ngata (Executive Producer)
